= Corofin =

Corofin or Corrofin may refer to:

- Corofin, County Clare, Ireland, a small town
- Corofin, County Galway, Ireland, a village
- Corofin GAA (disambiguation), Gaelic games clubs
- Corofin (parish), a Catholic parish based on the Clare town
