= Humdinger =

Humdinger can refer to:

- Humdinger (computer), an 8 bit color computer from 1983
- The Humdinger, a 2008 album by US rap group Nappy Roots
- Humdinger, a 2002 album by American soul and R&B singer Aaron Neville
- Humdinger, a 2006 album by Irish banjo player Enda Scahill and the Brock McGuire Band
- The Humdingers, a musical group that became the American doo-wop and R&B group the Showmen
- The Humdingers, an a capella musical group formed by Joe Oliva prior to the Essentials
- Humdinger, a 1997 album by the Hoax, a group led by Robin Davey
- "Humdinger", a song by J. J. Cale from the album Travel-Log
- Humdinger, a brand of beer made by Joseph Holt's Brewery, England
- Mayor Humdinger, a character from Paw Patrol
