= Denis Carey (composer) =

Irish musician and composer

- Origin: Newport, County Tipperary, Ireland
- Genres: Traditional Irish, Irish folk, Celtic
- Labels: Compass Records, Five Line Music
- Website: deniscarey.com

Denis Carey is an Irish musician and composer known for his solo work and as a member of Brock McGuire Band.

== Career ==
Along with Dave Keary and Ray Fean, Carey composed and produced the soundtrack for the Canadian film The Divine Ryans, featuring Oscar nominee Pete Postlethwaite. In 2000, Carey was specially commissioned by Shannon Heritage to compose and arrange the music for the show Style at Bunratty Folk Park in County Clare. The music for this show was recorded by Carey for the 2001 release Style - Stories of Irish Dance.

Carey won the 2004 award for LiveIreland.com's composer of the year.

In 2009, Carey released his album Moving On, which features Máirtín O'Connor, Paul Brock, Manus McGuire, Denis Ryan, Zoe Conway, Kenneth Rice, Tommy Hayes and others.

In January 2010, Carey won LiveIreland.com's Composer of the Year Award for the second time.

The Brock McGuire Band released "Green Grass Blue Grass" featuring Ricky Skaggs. The album was launched at The Grand Ole Opry on 11 March 2011 to a sold-out crowd.

In 2012, Denis released his first collection of original songs titled, "Denis Carey, Own Compositions".

== Notable performances ==
- Grand Ole Opry, Nashville, Tennessee
- The Town Hall, Broadway, New York,
- The Rebecca Cohn Auditorium, Halifax, Canada
- National Stadium, Dublin, Ireland
- Páirc Uí Chaoimh, Cork City, Ireland
- Celtic Colours, Cape Breton, Canada
- Milwaukee Irish Fest, Wisconsin, USA

== Previous collaborations ==
- Symphony Nova Scotia
- Royal Scottish National Orchestra
- Shane MacGowan
- Jon Kenny
- The Dubliners
- Ryan's Fancy
- Pat Shortt

== Discography ==
- Images
- An Turas (2000)
- Moving On (2009)
- Green Grass Blue Grass with The Brock McGuire Band (2011)

== Personal life ==
Originally from Newport, County Tipperary, Carey is the first cousin of Denis Ryan of Ryan's Fancy, and the father of entrepreneur Mark Carey.
