= Carl Hession =

Irish composer, arranger and pianist

Carl Hession is an Irish composer, arranger and pianist. His background includes many elements of his education in both traditional and modern (including jazz) and classical music.

Originally from Galway, Ireland, he participated in competitions at various Fleadhs throughout the country. He has All Ireland titles to his credit as a soloist and as a member of duets and trios with flute player Matt Molloy and accordion player Joe Burke. He studied classical piano at University College Cork, where he completed a B. A. in music, specialising in keyboard improvisation. He then performed with violin virtuoso Stéphane Grappelli.

Hession played with the ceili band Shaskeen, with whom he recorded several albums, and with Paul Brock's band Moving Cloud. He also worked with traditional musician friends Frankie Gavin and Joe Derrane and jazz/blues singer Mary Coughlan. With Gavin he recorded The Full Score (TARA 4020). Gavin also played on Hession's album Ceol Inne Ceol Inniu - Old Time New Time, along with Jackie Daly, Steve Cooney, Kevin Crawford and others. He also made recordings with jazz guitarist Louis Stewart.

For several years he was part of the Rhythm of the Dance team with the National Dance Company of Ireland.

Hession has written and arranged compositions for a number of orchestras and ensembles and collaborated with Aidan O'Carroll on the album Songs My Mother Taught Me.

Hession was a music teacher at various schools in Galway County, including Coláiste Iognáid, Galway, and most recently at Yeats College Galway, after which he commenced his retirement.

== Select discography ==
With Shaskeen

- The Shaskeen, Release Records BRL 4053.
- Green Groves of Erin. Traditional Irish Music and Song, Release Records XRL5001
- The Ash Plant, Release Records XRL5005
- Traditional Irish Music, Release Records. Audiocassette, 12 tracks.

Others

- Celtic Aura - Irish Traditional Music - compilation - 1990
- Mo Chairdin - with Paul Brock and Manus McGuire
- Old Time, New Time - 1995
- Moving Cloud - 1995
- Return to Inis Mór - 1996
- Tra Water's Edge - 1997
- Fox Glove - with Moving Cloud - 1998
- Mega Celtique
- Joe Derrane with Carl Hession
- Songs my Mother Taught Me - by Aidan O'Carroll
- Heart of Ireland - Collection of Celtic Songs - Compilation - 1998
- Shamrocks & Holy - An Irish Christmas Celebration - compilation - 2000
