= Best Troubador =

Studio album by Bonnie "Prince" Billy
- Released: May 5, 2017
- Length: 56:02
- Label: Drag City

Bonnie "Prince" Billy chronology
Epic Jammers and Fortunate Little Ditties (2016)	Best Troubador (2017)	Wolf of the Cosmos (2017)

Best Troubador is a studio album by American musician Bonnie "Prince" Billy. It was released on May 5, 2017, via Drag City Records, serving as a tribute to Merle Haggard, who died on April 6, 2016. It features contributions from AJ Roach, Emmett Kelly, Matt Sweeney, Mary Feiock, and the Bonafide United Musicians band, composed of Nuala Kennedy, Chris Rodahaffer, Danny Kiely, Van Campbell, Cheyenne Mize and Drew Miller.

The album peaked at number 72 in Scotland, number 73 in Flanders, number 127 in the Netherlands and number 192 in Wallonia.

== Critical reception ==
Professional ratings
Aggregate scores
Source	Rating
AnyDecentMusic?	7.5/10
Metacritic	78/100
Review scores
Source	Rating
AllMusic	4/5 stars
The Arts Desk	3/5 stars
Exclaim!	9/10
The Guardian	4/5 stars
The Line of Best Fit	8/10
Pitchfork	7.4/10
Record Collector	4/5 stars
The Skinny	3/5 stars
Tiny Mix Tapes	3.5/5 marks
Under the Radar	6/10 stars

Best Troubador was met with generally favourable reviews from music critics. At Metacritic, which assigns a normalized rating out of 100 to reviews from mainstream publications, the album received an average score of 78 based on fifteen reviews. The aggregator AnyDecentMusic? has the critical consensus of the album at a 7.5 out of 10, based on eighteen reviews.

Anthony Easton of Exclaim! praised the album, writing: "though it might seem strange that Oldham recorded the first major tribute to Haggard, the careful and well-thought-out working through of the master's themes makes deliberate sense". AllMusic's Mark Deming found the album "does a splendid job of showing how right he is about Haggard and his songs, and you'd have to go back to 1994's splendid multi-artist disc Tulare Dust to hear as sincere and affecting a tribute to this most American of artists". Jamie Atkins of Record Collector called it "a heartfelt, human and inspired way of celebrating Haggard's work". Ben Beaumont-Thomas of The Guardian wrote: "he strays further still from country's core sound, replacing the pedal steel and banjo with flutes, saxophones and acoustic guitar. By doing this, and choosing deep cuts rather than hits like "Okie From Muskogee", he universalises a music that is still overlooked by many listeners, and in some cases arguably improves it". Michael James Hall of The Line of Best Fit wrote: "while a covers album can be a pedestrian thing, often about what the artist can do to make their mark on a song or set of songs, Bonnie Prince Billy's homage to Haggard is so much more than that--it's reaching out to a ghost, pulling the uninitiated to a plane where it's possible for Haggard to be renewed and revitalised while all the time being revered and respected". Sam Sodomsky of Pitchfork wrote: "with Best Troubador, Oldham reflects the format's most expressive tendencies—to filter an artist's work through the lens of your fandom. Through these songs, Oldham's appreciation for Haggard seems to stem less from his innovation within the genre than for his patient evolution and longevity". Elizabeth Newton of Tiny Mix Tapes stated: "the fact that Best Troubador manages to outright milk unqualified whimsy from the life and music of one of country's most rugged, ambivalent heroes--well, it's really something".

In mixed reviews, Russ Coffey of The Arts Desk resumed: "Oldham's quivering voice always manages to sound a little wistful and somewhat folky". Will Fitzpatrick of The Skinny wrote: "much of the album remains true (or close enough) to the original arrangements, and you get a real sense that Oldham's singing these songs simply because he loves them and thinks other people should too. While that doesn't make for essential listening, it undoubtedly makes for an enjoyable and almost comforting experience". Stephen Mayne of Under the Radar called it "a pleasant, warm-hearted experience".

== Track listing ==
No.	Title	Writer(s)	Length
1.	"The Fugitive"	Casey Anderson; Liz Anderson	3:31
2.	"I'm Always on a Mountain When I Fall"	Chuck Howard	2:45
3.	"The Day the Rains Came"	Merle Haggard	3:12
4.	"Haggard (Like I've Never Been Before)"	Haggard; Doug Colosio	3:46
5.	"I Always Get Lucky with You"	Haggard; Freddy Powers; Gary Church; Tex Whitson	3:47
6.	"Leonard"	Haggard	3:13
7.	"My Old Pal"	Elsie McWilliams; Jimmie Rodgers	3:42
8.	"Roses in the Winter"	Haggard	3:58
9.	"Some of Us Fly"	Haggard	5:05
10.	"Wouldn't That Be Something"	Haggard; Powers	3:27
11.	"Pray"	Haggard	3:16
12.	"That's the Way Love Goes"	William Orville Frizzell; Sanger D. Shafer	3:04
13.	"Nobody's Darling"	Jimmie Davis	4:05
14.	"What I Hate" (Excerpt)	Haggard	0:20
15.	"I Am What I Am"	Haggard	4:16
16.	"If I Could Only Fly"	Michael David Fuller	4:35
Total length:			56:02

== Personnel ==
- Bonafide United Musicians
  - Nuala Kennedy – vocals, flute
  - Chris Rodahaffer – guitar, banjo
  - Danny Kiely – bass, recording, live mixing
  - Van Campbell – drums
  - Cheyenne Mize – fiddle
  - Drew Miller – saxophone
- AJ Roach – lead vocals & acoustic guitar (track 3)
- Emmett Kelly – additional vocals & electric guitar (track 4)
- Matt Sweeney – vocals & acoustic guitar (track 6)
- Mary Feiock – vocals (track 13)
- Kris Poulin – recording
- Cooper Crain – mixing
- Nate Thumas – engineering assistant
- Bob Weston – mastering
- Joseph McVetty – front cover illustration
- Farmer Tom Culton – photography
- Jessica Fey – photography
- Elsa Hansen Oldham – back cover photography, artwork
- Dan Osborn – layout

== Charts ==
Chart (2017)	Peak position
Belgian Albums (Ultratop Flanders)	73
Belgian Albums (Ultratop Wallonia)	192
Dutch Albums (Album Top 100)	127
Scottish Albums (Official Charts)	72
UK Americana Albums (Official Charts)	6
UK Independent Albums (Official Charts)	28
