= The Brock McGuire Band =

Irish folk group

- Origin: Ireland
- Genres: Traditional Irish; Irish folk Celtic
- Years active: 2001–present
- Label: Compass Records
- Members: Paul Brock; Manus McGuire; Denis Carey; Dave Curley
- Past members: Enda Scahill; Garry O'Meara
- Website: brockmcguireband.com

The Brock McGuire Band is an Irish Folk group fronted by Paul Brock and Manus McGuire. Residing in County Clare, button accordionist and melodeonist Paul Brock and fiddler Manus McGuire are two of Ireland’s most celebrated traditional musicians and have been at the forefront of Irish music for many years: They are joined by acclaimed composer Denis Carey on piano and dancer Dave Curley on banjo, mandolin and vocals.

The Brock McGuire Band performs Irish traditional music alongside American Old Time, Bluegrass, French-Canadian, and other Celtic traditions.

In 2011, they collaborated with various Nashville musicians including 14 time Grammy Winner Ricky Skaggs to record, "Green Grass Blue Grass". An exploration of the connection between Irish Traditional Music and American Bluegrass and Appalachian music. The album was launched on the Grand Ole Opry, 11 March 2011.

Green Grass Blue Grass featured Ricky Skaggs on mandolin, Bryan Sutton on guitar, Aubrey Haynie on fiddle, Jeff Taylor on accordion and Mark Fain on Double Bass. The album has been described by critics as "an adrenaline rush", "a masterpiece" and "virtuosity in full flight".

== Notable performances ==
- Grand Ole Opry, Nashville, Tennessee
- Cleveland Irish Festival, Cleveland, Ohio
- Celtic Colours, Cape Breton
- World Music Fest, Chicago, Illinois
- Return to Camden Town Festival, London
- National Concert Hall, Bogota, Colombia

== Members ==
- Paul Brock – button accordion/melodeon
- Manus McGuire – fiddle
- Denis Carey – piano
- Dave Curley – banjo/mandolin/vocal

== Discography ==
- Brock McGuire Band (2004)
- Humdinger (2006)
- Green Grass Blue Grass with Ricky Skaggs (2011)

== Awards ==
- 'Irish Music Album Of The Year' Irish Times for Humdinger (2006)
- 5-star 'Top of the World' Songlines (2011)
- 'Instrumental Band of the Decade' Irish American News (2011)
