= Doonaree =

Doonaree may refer to:

- Doonaree, List of townlands of County Galway
- "Doonaree", song by E. Boland recorded by Vera Lynn in 1955, Carmel Quinn in 1955 and Robert Wilson in 1959
- Doonaree record label, with Shaskeen Shaskeen: Irish Pub Session, released 16 May 2006
