= When We Fall =

When We Fall may refer to:

- When We Fall (Rebecca Frazier album), 2013
- When We Fall (All Our Exes Live in Texas album), 2017

== See also ==
- When We All Fall Asleep, Where Do We Go?, a 2019 studio album by Billie Eilish
