= Nels Andrews =

American folk singer

- Genres: Indie folk, singer-songwriter
- Occupation: Singer-songwriter
- Instruments: Vocals, guitar
- Years active: 2002–present
- Labels: Lucky Dice, Reveal, Ignatius

Nels Andrews is a folk singer based in Santa Cruz, California. In 2002, Andrews was selected as a winner in the New Folk Competition at the annual Kerrville Folk Festival in Kerrville, Texas. In 2006, Nels was selected as the winner of the Telluride Bluegrass Festival's Troubadour Competition. In August 2006, Nels was selected as a winner of the Mountain Stage New Song Competition. Andrews' debut full-length recording, Sunday Shoes rose to Number 1 on the UK Americana Chart, and finished the year ranked Number 4 on the Euro Americana Chart's Top 20 albums of 2004.

== Discography ==
Studio albums

- Sunday Shoes (March 15, 2005, self-released)
- Off Track Betting (2008, Reveal Records)
- Scrimshaw (2012)

EPs & singles

- Some Pig (EP)
- Duct Tape & Whiskey (split single with AJ Roach)
