= Nuala Kennedy =

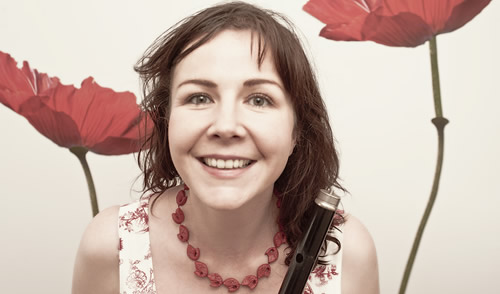
- Kennedy in 2011

Background information
- Born: 30 January 1977 (age 49); Dundalk, County Louth, Ireland
- Genres: Irish traditional music, Celtic
- Occupation: Musician
- Instruments: Irish flute, keyboards
- Years active: 2002–present
- Label: Compass
- Website: nualakennedy.com

Nuala Kennedy (born 30 January 1977) is an Irish composer, singer, songwriter, and multi-instrumentalist.

== Early life ==
Kennedy grew up in Dundalk, County Louth, Ireland, where she played piano and flute in a local ceili band and studied classical piano at the Royal Irish Academy of Music. Dundalk is an area rich in mythology and musical heritage and has strong historical links to Scotland. This was to influence her later career when she moved at age eighteen to Edinburgh.

In Edinburgh Nuala studied Design at Edinburgh College of Art and played regularly at sessions throughout the city. Nuala holds a post graduate diploma in Education from the University of Edinburgh and a Master of Music from Newcastle University. In late 2000 Nuala began playing alongside Kris Drever and Anna-Wendy Stevenson in a weekly Friday session at Sandy Bell's pub in Edinburgh. The trio became known as Fine Friday and toured in the UK, Europe and Australia, releasing two albums before disbanding.

== Career ==
In 2007, Compass Records released Nuala's first solo recording, The New Shoes, where she was recognized as an exceptional interpreter of the tradition. She went on to release Tune In (2010) and Noble Stranger (2012). She has collaborated, performed and recorded with Will Oldham, Norman Blake from Teenage Fanclub, Cathal McConnell from Boys of the Lough, Frode Haltli, Vegar Vardal, Oliver Schroer, John Doyle, and American singer-songwriter, AJ Roach

Nuala tours globally as Nuala Kennedy Band headlining at major festivals such as Rudolstadt (GER) Telemark (NOR) Celtic Connections (UK) Celtic Colours International (CAN) Festival Interceltique de Lorient (FRA) Eurofonik (FRA) and Milwaukee Irish Festival (US). She is a member of Oirialla playing music from her native Oriel alongside Gerry O'Connor, accordionist Martin Quinn and Breton guitarist Gilles Le Bigot. Nuala also plays in the Irish traditional music power trio, The Alt, with John Doyle and Eamon O'Leary. In 2014, she released their eponymous record on her independent label, Under the Arch Records, and a second The Alt album Day Is Come was released on 3 February 2022. In 2025, she started touring with musical group Solas.

== Personal life ==
Nuala is married to the Appalachian singer-songwriter A. J. Roach. The couple live in Ennis, Co Clare, Ireland with their two small children.

== Accolades ==
- Nominated for Instrumental Group of the Year, Canadian Folk Awards, 2012
- Nominated for Ensemble of the Year, Canadian Folk Awards, 2012,
- Nominated for Best Live Act, Scottish Folk Awards, 2013

== Discography ==
=== As leader or co-leader ===
- The New Shoes (Compass, 2007)
- Tune In (Compass, 2010)
- Enthralled with Oliver Schroer (Borealis, 2012)
- Noble Stranger (Compass, 2012)
- A Wee Selection: Some Scottish Tunes On Flute & Guitar with Mike Bryan (Under The Arch, 2014)
- Behave the Bravest (Under The Arch, 2016)
- Shorelines (self released, 2023)
- Hydra with Eamon O'Leary (Under The Arch, 2024)

Snowflake Trio

- Sun Dogs - with Vegar Vårdal & Frode Haltli (Ta:lik, 2019)

With The Alt

- The Alt - with John Doyle & Eamon O'Leary (Under The Arch, 2014)
- Day Is Come - with John Doyle & Eamon O'Leary (Under The Arch, 2022)

With Oirialla

- Oirialla - with Gerry O'Connor, Giles Le Bigot & Martin Quinn (Lughnasa, 2012)

With Fine Friday

- Gone Dancing (Foot Stompin', 2002)
- Mowing the Machair (Foot Stompin', 2005)

With Harem Scarem

- Let Them Eat Fishcake (Vertical, 2002)
- The Birnam Witch Project (Vertical, 2005)

=== As guest ===
- Is It the Sea? Bonnie "Prince" Billy with Harem Scarem (Domino, 2008)
- Call It My Garden, Carrie Elkin (2011)
- Best Troubadour, Bonnie "Prince" Billy (2017)
