= Rebecca Frazier =

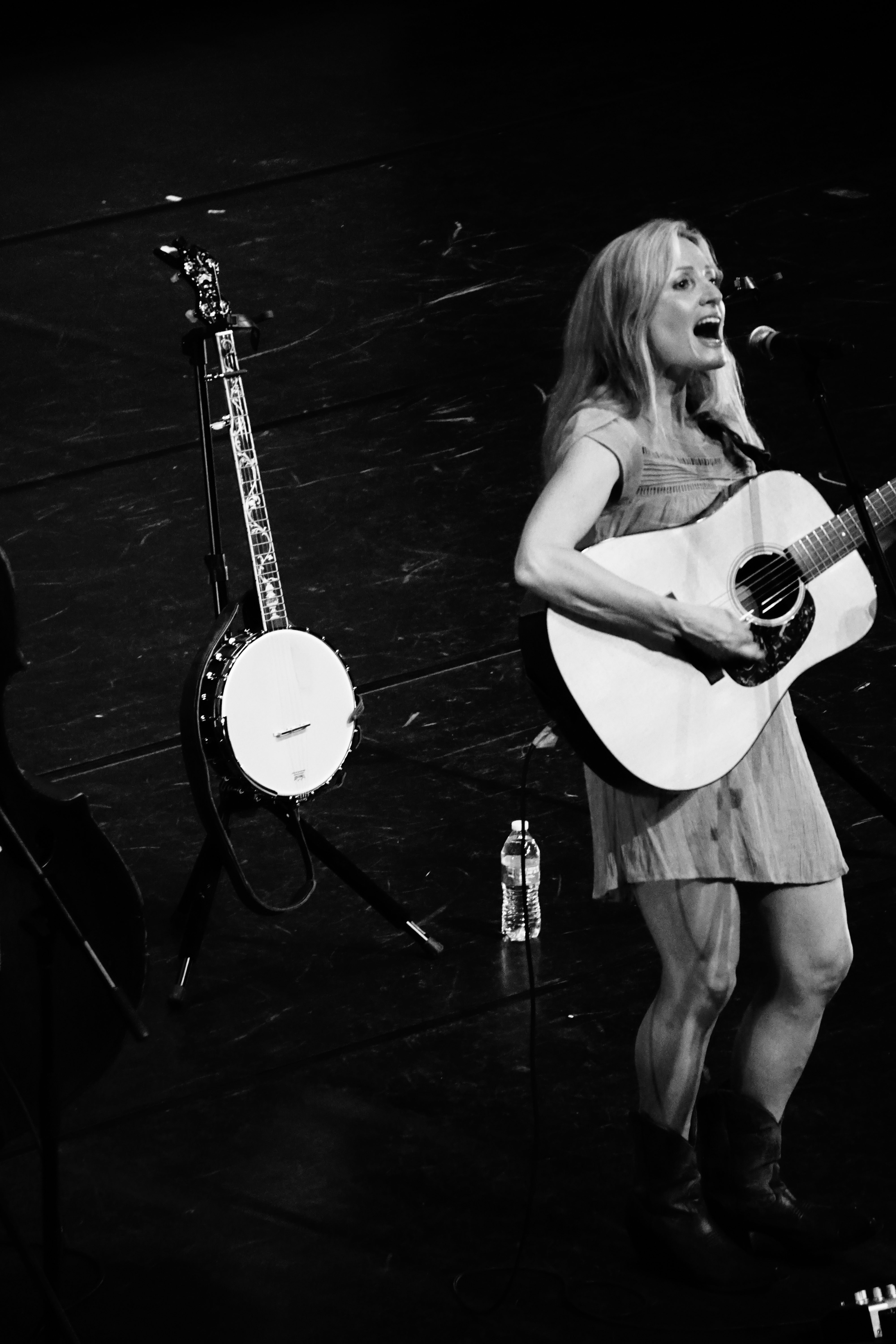
- Frazier performing in 2018

Background information
- Born: Rebecca Hoggan; 1975 or 1976 (age 50–51)
- Origin: Richmond, Virginia, U.S.
- Genres: Bluegrass; folk; Americana; indie pop
- Occupations: Musician; songwriter
- Instruments: Guitar; banjo; vocals
- Years active: 1996–present
- Label: Compass Records
- Formerly of: Hit and Run
- Website: rebeccafrazier.com

Rebecca Frazier (née Hoggan; born 1975 or 1976) is an American bluegrass musician.

== Biography ==
Frazier grew up in Richmond, Virginia. She graduated from the University of Michigan in 1998, where she won two Hopwood writing awards.

Frazier was a founding member of the Colorado-based bluegrass group Hit and Run. As a solo artist, she is based in Nashville, Tennessee. She cites Tony Rice, Doc Watson, Clarence White, Jerry Garcia, and Russ Barenberg as influences.

In September 2006, Frazier was the first woman to be featured on the cover of Flatpicking Guitar Magazine, and in 2017, Paste featured Frazier in an article entitled "7 Women Smashing the Bluegrass Glass Ceiling."

Frazier has released two albums as a solo artist: When We Fall (2013) and Boarding Windows in Paradise (2024), both on Compass Records.
