= Murder of Eileen Costello O'Shaughnessy =

1997 unsolved murder in Ireland

Eileen Costello O'Shaughnessy was a 47-year-old Irish woman who was murdered on 30 November 1997 while working as a taxi driver in Galway city. Her murder remains unsolved.

== Background ==
Costello O'Shaughnessy was originally from Corofin, County Galway. She was a mother of two adult children and was separated from her husband, a Garda. Following her separation, she moved in with her mother. She worked as a taxi driver in Galway and had previously worked as a hairdresser.

== Death ==
On 30 November 1997, Costello O'Shaughnessy began work at 8am. At 8pm she contacted her taxi base and said she was taking a fare to Claregalway. About 20 minutes later the base attempted to contact her about a fare but got no reply. Costello O'Shaughnessy was due to meet the taxi owner at 9pm on Dyke Road, Galway, to hand over the taxi and keys so that he could take over the night shift, but she did not show up. He made unsuccessful attempts to contact her.

After Costello O'Shaughnessy could not be contacted, a number of taxi drivers in Galway began searching for her and her taxi, a silver Toyota Carina license plate number 97-G-6663. The taxi was soon discovered at Lydon House Bakery on the Tuam Road in Galway. Hair and blood were found within the vehicle and there had been an attempt to rip out the taxi meter. The taxi meter read 17 miles, the exact distance from Galway city center to the body dump site and back to where the car was dumped.

A search for Costello O'Shaughnessy began and her body was discovered shortly before midday following day, 1 December 1997, on Tinkers Lane, Knockdoemore. She had been badly beaten. The post-mortem found that she had died from head injuries and had not been sexually assaulted.

== Investigation ==
Gardaí immediately suspected robbery was the motive for the killing as her taxi earnings, believed to be around £70, were gone.

Following the murder, Costello O'Shaughnessy's mother Nora reported that the household had received a number of calls in the run up to the murder where the caller said nothing for a number of minutes before hanging up.

Gardaí investigated a potential link between the killing and an attempted abduction of a female driver that occurred shortly before the murder and close to where her car was found.

Following the murder, taxi drivers and businessmen in the area raised a £30,000 reward for information that led to the conviction of the killer. An anonymous donor later increased the reward to £80,000.

Gardaí travelled to England to interview a convicted killer who had been in Galway at the time of the murder.

In 2001 Gardaí arrested double murderer Thomas Murray for questioning about Costello O'Shaughnessy's murder. Murray was convictied of the 1981 killing his neighbour William Mannion, which he committed when he was just 17. While out on parole in 2000, Murray killed Nancy Nolan. Murray was on temporary release and living and working in Galway at the time of Costello O'Shaughnessy's murder. It emerged that Gardaí suspected Murray of the murder early into the investigation but he had an alibi, however it was later discovered that he had no alibi for the time of the murder.

On the 25th anniversary of Costello O'Shaughnessy's murder, Gardaí issued a renewed appeal for the public's assistance in solving the crime. They highlighted a number of leads they were investigating and requested help identifying a number of potential witnesses. One concerned a sighting of a blonde female walking on the hard shoulder of the N17 near the body dump site. The woman was walking against traffic and appeared distressed.

A further sighting took place at 8:45pm on the night of the murder on the N17. A driver saw Costello O'Shaughnessy's taxi being driven erratically by a bearded man who turned left at Lydon House Bakery; the location where the taxi was found. A man was also seen jumping off a wall at Lydon House Bakery at 9pm on the night of the murder. The man was described as wearing a green jacket and carrying a small canvas bag.

At 2am on the morning after the murder, a red car with its parking lights on was seen in Tinkers Lane, the location where Costello O'Shaughnessy's body was found.

== Aftermath ==
A memorial stone for Costello O'Shaughnessy was unveiled in Eyre Square for the 10th anniversary of her murder. A plaque was also placed at the location where her body was found.

== Media ==
Costello O'Shaughnessy's murder was featured in RTÉ's Crimeline program which led to a number of tips. The murder was also featured in the television documentary Solved and Unsolved. Her murder was also featured in an episode of Crimecall. The crime was also covered in episode of the true crime podcast Mens Rea.

Her murder was also covered in the true crime book The Cold Case Files: On the Trail of Ireland's Undetected Killers by Barry Cummins.

To mark the 15th anniversary of Costello O'Shaughnessy's murder, taxi drivers around Galway placed "Justice" stickers to highlight the lack of resolution in the case. A website, justiceforeileen.com, was also set up.

== See also ==
- List of unsolved murders (1980–1999)
