= Hit and Run (band) =

American bluegrass band

Hit & Run
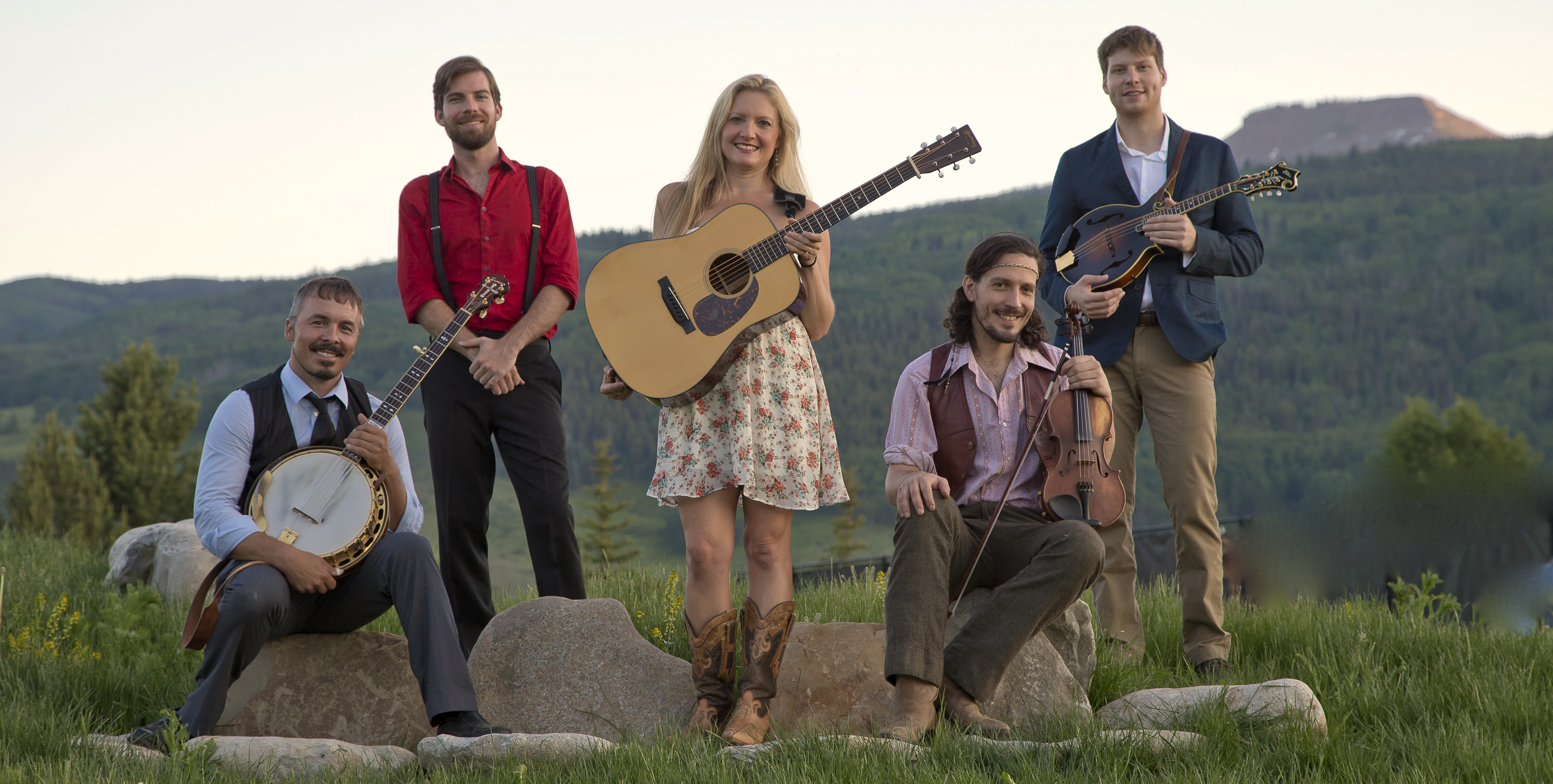
- Hit & Run performing in Colorado, 2015

Background information
- Origin: Boulder, Colorado, U.S.
- Genres: Bluegrass; folk; Americana
- Occupation(s): Singer-songwriter, instrumentalist, educator
- Instrument(s): Guitar, mandolin, banjo, vocals, resonator guitar, fiddle, bass
- Years active: 2001–present
- Labels: Amtoco, CMH
- Members: Rebecca Frazier; Mike Mickelson; Erin Coats; Aaron Younberg; John Frazier
- Past members: Kyle Tuttle; Andy Thorn; Lorenzo Gangi; Steve Roy; David Richey; Jarrod Walker; Christian Ward
- Website: hitandrunbluegrass.com

Hit & Run is a bluegrass band originally from Colorado, now based in Tennessee.

== History ==
Hit & Run formed in Colorado in late 2001 with the mutual desire to play authentic-yet-modern bluegrass. The band has released two studio albums. Hit & Run has toured extensively throughout the United States, playing such prestigious festivals as Telluride Bluegrass Festival, High sierra music festival, Grand Targhee Bluegrass Festival, Grey Fox Bluegrass Festival, Rockygrass Bluegrass Festival, and Bean Blossom.

Hit & Run has shared billing with artists such as Creedence Clearwater Revisited, Jerry Douglas, Hot Rize, Alison Krauss, and David Grisman. In 2005 they took first place in the SPBGMA International Band Championship in Nashville. In 2003, Hit & Run became the first band to win both Telluride (2003) and Rockygrass (2002) Bluegrass Festival Band Contests. Guitarist Rebecca Frazier became the first woman to appear on the cover of Flatpicking Guitar Magazine when the September 2006 issue of that magazine was released.

The group now tours as Rebecca Frazier and Hit & Run Bluegrass. The lineup consists of Rebecca Frazier (née Hoggan) on guitar, Isaac Eicher on mandolin, Mike Sumner on banjo, Erik Alvar on bass, and Nate Leath and Christian Ward sharing fiddle duties.

== Successes ==
- 2005 & 2014 International Bluegrass Music Association Showcase Artist
- First place, 2005 SPBGMA International Band Championship Nashville, TN
- First place, 2003 Telluride Bluegrass Festival Band Contest Telluride, CO & Lyons, CO
- First place, 2002 Rockygrass Band Contest Lyons, CO

== Sound ==
Hit & Run is far and away the most exciting bluegrass act in Colorado right now. They have been able to harness a style of bluegrass that has both young kids and older folks lining up in the streets for their show, each and every time they play.

Hit & Run's appeal may be their youthful energy combined with polished vocals, hot picking, and their contemporary sound. They tastefully interpret standard bluegrass and traditional tunes, and they skillfully craft original tunes. As Denver Westword says, their music is:

. . handspun yet motor-driven, a well-oiled machine of sound produced by men and women with flying fingers and high, lonesome voices.

== Members ==
=== Original members ===
- Rebecca Frazier – Mandolin, guitar, vocals
- Mike Mickelson – Guitar, mandolin, vocals
- Erin Coats – Upright bass, vocals
- Aaron Younberg – Banjo
- John Frazier, mandolin

=== Past members ===
- Kyle Tuttle, banjo (2013–2015)
- Andy Thorn, banjo (2007–2010)
- Lorenzo Gangi, banjo (2006–2007)
- Steve Roy, bass (2006–2010)
- David Mayfield, bass (2007)
- David Richey, Dobro (2006)

== Discography ==
- Beauty Fades (2004)
- Without Maps or Charts (2005)
- Four Finger Music: The Bluegrass Tribute to the Music Made Famous by the Simpsons (2007)
