= AJ Roach =

American singer-songwriter

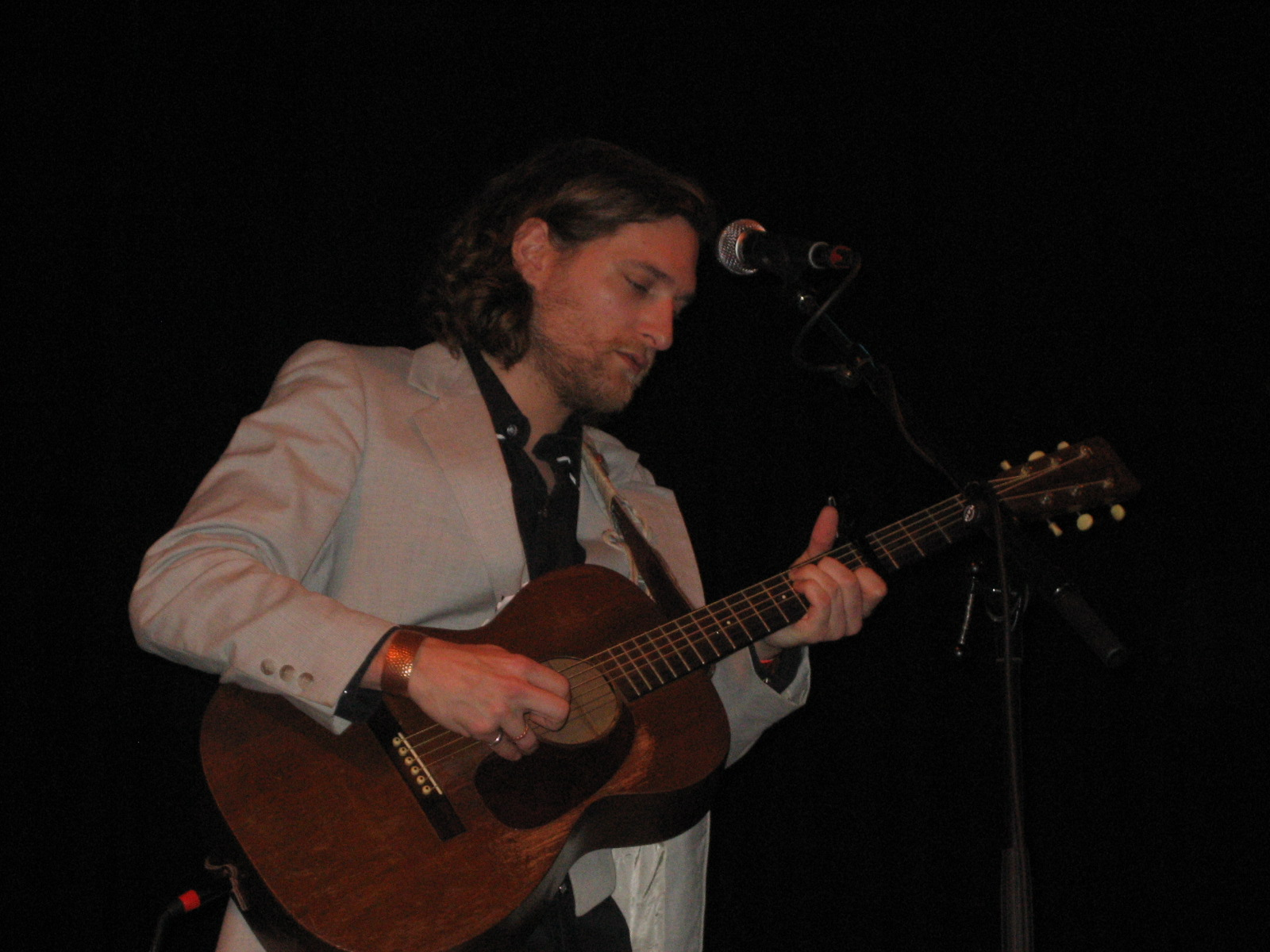
- AJ Roach at Paradiso, Amsterdam, The Netherlands (June 10, 2007)

Background information
- Also known as: Mr. Pleistocene, The Appalachian Sensation
- Born: December , 1975; Newport News, Virginia, US
- Genres: Singer-songwriter, indie folk
- Instruments: Voice, guitar, banjo
- Years active: 2003–present
- Labels: Waterbug, Lucky Dice
- Members: A. J. Roach; Adam Roszkiewicz; Alisa Rose; Nuala Kennedy; Anthony da Costa
- Website: www.roachmusic.com

AJ Roach (born 1975) is an American singer-songwriter originally from Virginia, but now based in Ennis, Co. Clare, Ireland. Roach was born in Newport News, Virginia, but his family moved to his parents' ancestral home in Duffield, Virginia when Roach was still very young.

As a teenager, Roach reportedly spent a number of months under the tutelage of cult blues guitarist Washboard Williams; however this rumor has never been properly substantiated, and Roach's playing style does not suggest such tutelage.

After attending college in Virginia, Roach lived in several different cities on the east coast of the United States before moving to San Francisco. The move to San Francisco was a turning point for Roach's musical career. There he met and befriended musicians like Tom Meshishnik, Todd Sickafoose, Sean Hayes and Noe Venable. The musical impact that these relationships had on Roach can be heard on Dogwood Winter, his first studio album. The album was jointly produced by Meshishnik and Sickafoose, and features Venable on backing vocals on several tracks.

== Musical style ==
A. J. Roach's writing blurs the line between indie and traditional folk, and he has drawn comparisons in the press to Will Oldham, David Eugene Edwards and Vic Chesnutt. He is considered a troubadour in the tradition of Townes Van Zandt, Bob Dylan and Leonard Cohen. Roach's dry and cutting wit has made the stories he sometimes tells between songs almost as celebrated as the songs themselves.

== Touring ==
Roach is best known for his vigorous touring schedule in both the United States and in Europe, at times performing as many as 250 dates per year. Roach has had a number of "revolving cast" musicians who have formed his band over the years. Some musicians that Roach has performed and or recorded with include Mia Birdsong (vocals), Todd Sickafoose (bass), Noe Venable (vocals), Alisa Rose (violin), Nels Cline (guitar), Brian Williams (guitar), Adam Roszkiewicz (guitar, mandolin), Nino Moschella (drums), Tom Meshishnik (guitar), Ian Parks (guitar, bass, organ), Steve Moore (piano, trombone).

AJ Roach's first full-length recording is entitled Dogwood Winter and was released in the United States in the summer of 2003 on the New Folkstar recording label. A subsequent UK release followed in January 2005. A follow-up to Dogwood Winter, Revelation, was released in the UK in late 2006 and had an American release in January 2008 on Waterbug Records. Revelation reached number 1 on the Euro-Americana Chart in December 2006. Also in December 2006, the album reached number 5 on the Freeform Americana and Roots (FAR) Chart.

Roach frequently appears in concert with Nels Andrews. The two are close friends and have toured together often in both the United States and Europe. They are reportedly planning a full-length album together, having already recorded a split 7-inch vinyl entitled Duct Tape & Whiskey.

== Awards and Distinctions ==
In 2004, Roach was the general category recipient of the 12th Annual Chris Austin Songwriting Award at MerleFest in Wilkesboro, North Carolina.

Revelation reached number 1 on the Euro-Americana Chart in December 2006

A. J. Roach was one of the six winners of the 2011 Kerrville Grassy Hill New Folk competition at the 39th Annual Kerrville Folk Festival in Kerrville, TX

The second track from Roach's second album was prominently included in both the CW TV series One Tree Hill, seventh season, episode No. 01 and in Showtime's United States of Tara, third season, episode #06)

== Discography ==
- Appalachia EP (2002, New Folk Star)
- Dogwood Winter (2003, New Folk Star)
- Live EP (2004, New Folk Star)
- Duct Tape & Whiskey – Split 7-inch vinyl single with Nels Andrews (2005, New Folk Star)
- Revelation (2006 Lucky Dice (UK); 2008, Waterbug (US))

(The second track, "Devil May Dance" can be heard in the TV series One Tree Hill, seventh season, episode No. 01 and in United States of Tara, third season, episode #06)

- The Poplar Tree (On Hold)
- Pleistocene (2011)

=== On compilations ===
- "Black Lung" on Music of Coal: Mining Songs from the Appalachian Coalfields (2007 Lonesome)
