= When We Fall (Rebecca Frazier album) =

Studio album by Rebecca Frazier
- Released: May 28, 2013
- Genre: Bluegrass; Country; Folk; Americana
- Label: Compass
- Producer: Brent Truitt; Rebecca Frazier

When We Fall is the second studio album by bluegrass, Americana, and folk artist, Rebecca Frazier. The album, co-produced by Brent Truitt, was released on May 28, 2013. The album is Frazier's first release with Nashville-based Compass Records. All of the songs and guitar instrumentals were composed or co-written by Frazier, with the exception of tracks 1 and 6. The album was featured in The Bluegrass Situation's Looking Back: Our Top Picks of 2013; contributor Henry Carrigan writes "...Rebecca Frazier's When We Fall is the best bluegrass album of 2013....Frazier easily stands in the ranks of Alison Krauss and Rhonda Vincent, and her compelling lyrics transport us through the pain of loss, love's disappointments, and the hope of healing."

== Track listing ==
1. "Human Highway" -3:10 (Neil Young)
2. "Better than Staying" -2:52 (Rebecca Frazier, John Frazier)
3. "When We Fall" -3:41 (Rebecca Frazier)
4. "Virginia Coastline" -3:04 (Rebecca Frazier)
5. "Walk This Road" -3:04 (Rebecca Frazier, John Frazier)
6. "Ain't Gonna Work Tomorrow" -3:45 (Traditional, arr. R. & J. Frazier)
7. "Morning & Night" -2:50 (Rebecca Frazier, John Frazier)
8. "Love, Go Away From This House" -4:17 (Rebecca Frazier)
9. "Clifftop" -3:34 (Rebecca Frazier)
10. "Darken Your Doorway" -3:36 (Rebecca Frazier)
11. "40 Blues" -3:49 (Rebecca Frazier)
12. "Babe in Arms" -3:11 (Rebecca Frazier, John Frazier)

== Personnel ==
- Rebecca Frazier: Guitar, Lead Vocals
- Barry Bales: Bass
- Andy Hall: Dobro
- Scott Vestal: Banjo (Tracks 2, 4,5,9,11)
- Ron Block: Banjo (Tracks 1,6,7,10)
- John Frazier: Mandolin, Harmony Vocals
- Shad Cobb: Fiddle
- Shelby Means: Harmony Vocals

== Chart positions ==
Chart	Peak position
U.S. Billboard Top Bluegrass Albums	16
Roots Music Report (Bluegrass)	3
Bluegrass Today Chart	6
Americana Chart	72
Folk DJ Chart	54
