= We Banjo 3 =

Irish band

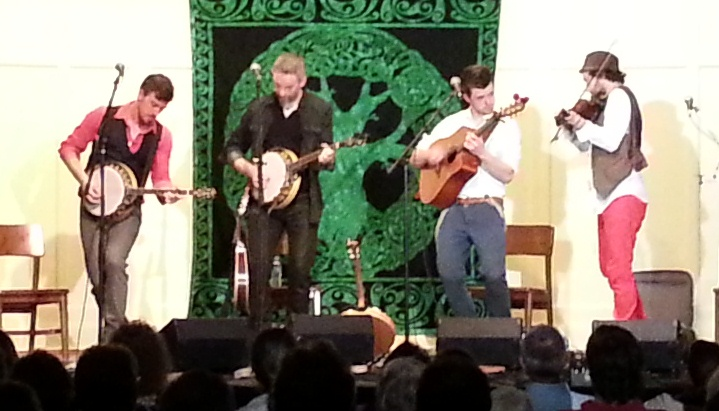
- We Banjo 3

Background information
- Origin: Galway, Ireland
- Genres: Celtgrass, Irish traditional, bluegrass
- Years active: 2011–2023
- Label: Sonas Recording
- Members: Enda Scahill; Martin Howley; David Howley; Fergal Scahill
- Website: www.webanjo3.com

We Banjo 3 was a band from Galway, Ireland that played a blend of traditional Irish, old time, and bluegrass music they called Celtgrass. The band was composed of two sets of brothers, Enda Scahill and Fergal Scahill and Martin and David Howley. Earle Hitchner, music writer for The Wall Street Journal, described their playing as a "freshness and finesse bordering on the magical," and LiveIreland proclaiming them "the hottest group in Irish music." Their debut album Roots of the Banjo Tree was released in 2012 and was named "Traditional Music Album of the Year" by The Irish Times. This was followed by the release of Gather the Good in 2014. Siobhan Long, music critic for the Irish Times, wrote "We Banjo 3 are a musical Betty Ford Clinic, almost singlehandedly rehabilitating the much maligned banjo in 4 short years." In 2016 the band released their fourth album String Theory which debuted at Number One on the Billboard Charts.

== The band ==
The band's line-up is;

- Enda Scahill – Banjo, Mandolin, Tenor Guitar
- Martin Howley – Banjo, Mandolin, Tenor Guitar
- David Howley – Banjo, Vocals, Guitar
- Fergal Scahill – Fiddle, Guitar, Bodhrán

The members of the band have been highly successful in the competitive music field with Martin winning seven All Ireland titles on the banjo and Enda capturing the award four times. Fergal and David have likewise been honoured earning All Ireland titles on the banjo, fiddle, bodhrán and guitar. They are often joined on stage by Martin's wife Kiana June Weber.

In 2016 the band was selected to play for President Barack Obama and Taoiseach Enda Kenny at the annual "Friends of Ireland" luncheon held in Washington, DC around Saint Patrick's Day. President Obama praised the band's show calling it, "Great music. Incredible performance."

In 2017 Fergal embarked on a challenge to record a tune a day for the entire year. His recordings, posted Facebook, instagram (@fergalscahillmusic) and YouTube have become popular worldwide with some videos obtaining over 100,000 views.

== Discography ==
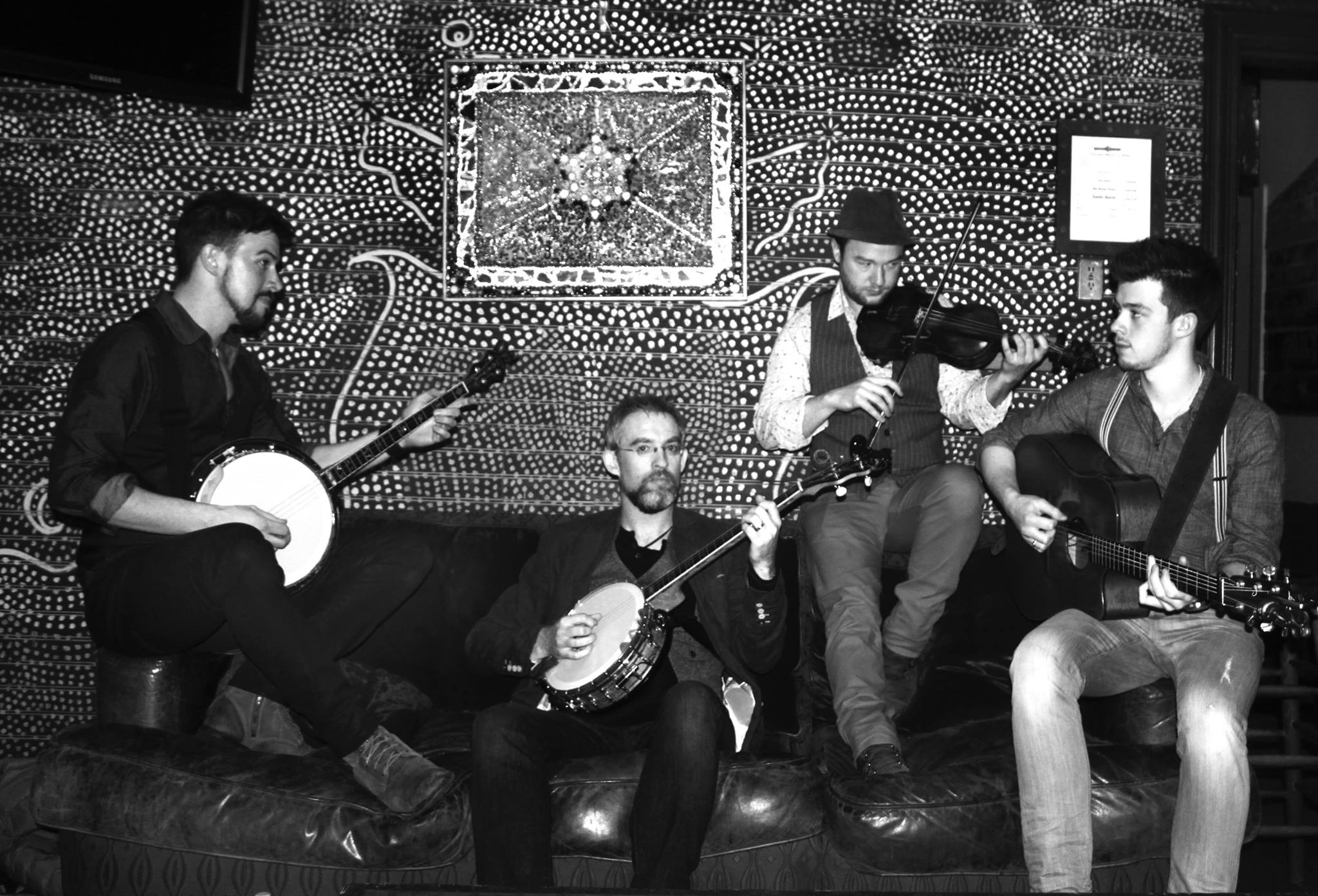
L to R, Martin, Enda, Fergal and David backstage at the House of Blues, Chicago

Roots of the Banjo Tree (2012) – Tony Lawless of Tradconnect writes, "A banjo inspired album has never sounded so good, so pleasing to the ear or so inventive in its approach."

Gather the Good (2014) – Awarded the Irish American News Vocal/Instrumental Album of the Year, "Their blend of Irish and Americana is perfection, cutting edge, and educational at the same time. Marvelous stuff from a group that still stops us dead in our tracks."

Live in Galway (2015) – The Irish Times writes, “When you've forged such a great reputation on the back of your live performances, it makes sense to try to capture that elusive zeitgeist in full flight. We Banjo 3 have done just that with this recording” adding that "the richness of (David's) tone and sophistication of his phrasing are still show-stoppers".

String Theory (2016) – In a review by the Irish Times, "their fourth album, sees them hurtle into the wide blue yonder with a kit bag of exceptional tunes and a propulsive wit that tickles at the perimeter of many of their sets." The album was ranked Number One on the Billboard World Charts when it was released.

Haven (2018) –Kathy Stockbridge, music writer for NYS Music, describes Haven as “Celtgrass music that brings heartfelt message to listeners.” In August 2018 the album reached the top of the Billboard charts for bluegrass music.
