= The Divine Ryans =

- Directed by: Stephen Reynolds
- Written by: Wayne Johnston
- Produced by: Christopher Zimmer
- Starring: Jordan Harvey; Robert Joy
- Cinematography: Alwyn Kumst
- Edited by: Jeff Warren
- Music by: Denis Carey; Ray Fean; Dave Keary
- Production company: Enterprise Newfoundland
- Distributed by: Red Sky Entertainment
- Release date: 1999
- Running time: 106 minutes
- Country: Canada
- Language: English

The Divine Ryans is a 1999 Canadian film directed by Stephen Reynolds, written by Wayne Johnston as an adaptation of his novel, and starring Robert Joy and Pete Postlethwaite. The film tells the story of the Ryan family, who run a funeral parlour in St. John's, Newfoundland and Labrador.

== Plot ==
The Ryans of St John's, Newfoundland, are an old family steeped in tradition. Donald Ryan edits the local newspaper while his brothers and sisters run the funeral parlour. Early one morning, Donald's son Draper Doyle goes to the newspaper office to surprise his father with a birthday cake, only to witness something traumatic. Two days later, Donald Ryan is dead. In the ensuing weeks, Draper Doyle's sleep is plagued by nightmares, and he realises he has no memories of the time surrounding his father's death. With the help of his uncle Reg, Draper Doyle tries to come to terms with the truth about Donald Ryan, and the key to this may be Donald's lucky hockey puck.

== Cast ==
- Jordan Harvey as Draper Doyle Ryan
- Robert Joy as Donald Ryan
- Pete Postlethwaite as Uncle Reg Ryan
- Wendel Meldrum as Linda Ryan
- Mary Walsh as Aunt Phil Ryan
- Marguerite McNeil as Sister Louise Ryan
- Rick Boland as Father Seymour Ryan
- Genevieve Tessier as Mary Ryan
- Patrick Savard Walsh as Potter
- Louis Bernard as Young Leonard
- Jody Richardson as Seymour's Assistant
- Michael Chiasson as The Archbishop
- Stephen Lush as Donald's Friend
- Bryan Hennessey as Bard of St. John's

== Accolades ==
The film received three Genie Award nominations at the 20th Genie Awards in 2000, for Best Adapted Screenplay (Johnston), Best Cinematography (Alywn Kumst) and Best Sound Editing (Alastair Gray, Donna Powell and Clive Turner).
