= Foddershock =

Foddershock are an appalachian band formed in Clintwood, Virginia in 2000. They have self-produced and released nine albums and have appeared on one collaboration album.

Their name does not come from the usual definition meaning a mound of food for livestock, instead the songwriter for the band V.W Hill confirmed in a 2003 interview for the forum Liquid Stereo in 2003 that "The name comes from back in the days before the internet and a time when we only had one fuzzy station on the television. We had a form of ancient communication called citizen's band radio. It was my brother who used the "handle" Foddershock first. So I stole it from him... later on it was said by one particular radio DJ. Hey this music gives you Fodder for thought and is sometimes quite Shocking.".

When they were originally formed in 2000, the band was formed of two members, V.W Hill and A.K (Tony) Mullins. The band was formed after Mullins' wife showed Hill some of his poetry and Hill started setting it to music. The band was later expanded by Matt Mullins (lead and resonator guitar), Kevin Phillips (bass) and Marty Rose (percussion). Following the expansion of the band Foddershock's music became more electrified and expansive, and began to be seen as psychedelic Southern Rock.

Foddershock's music has been labeled "appalachian dysfunctional folk rock" due to their backwoods mountain sound and the Southern Gothic surrealism contained in their lyrics.

They have had songs in movies ("Comin' Down The Mountain", "Coal Bucket Outlaw") and on the compilation album "Music of Coal" which was nominated for a Grammy in 2007.

In September 2014, they performed at Back Roads Music Festival in Wise, Virginia. Throughout the rest of 2014, they were scheduled to perform across Virginia, Kentucky and Tennessee.

In March 2025, they performed at "Heads Above Water", a benefit concert for flood relief in Dickenson County. They were also scheduled to perform with The Local Honeys at The Jettie Baker Center on May 10th 2025.

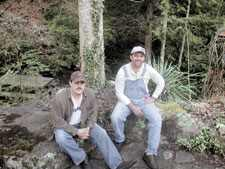
Foddershock

== Discography ==
- Roadkill Expressway (2000)
- Ghost Of Lonzo (2001)
- One Good Eye (2002)
- Black Lung & White Lightnin (2003)
- Inbreds From Outer Space (2004)
- Corn On Macabre (2006)
- Sordid Details Of The Human Condition (2009)
- Somewhere Between Heifer And Hell (2011)
- God Awful Truth (2015)

=== Collaboration ===
- Music Of Coal' (2007 - Various Artist compilation)

== Sources ==
- "Foddershock | ReverbNation". reverbnation.com.
- "Foddershock | Facebook". facebook.com.
- "Foddershock | Sounclick". Soundclick.com. 17 September 2003.
