= Music of Coal =

Compilation album by Various artists
- Released: 2007
- Genre: blues, bluegrass, country, folk
- Label: Lonesome Pine Records & Publishing
- Producer: Jack Wright

Music of Coal: Mining Songs from the Appalachian Coalfields is a 70-page book and two CD compilation of old and new music from southern Appalachian coalfields. The project was produced by Jack Wright and is a benefit for the Lonesome Pine Office on Youth in Wise County, Virginia.

The songs included cover a range of topics related to coal culture such as mining accidents and black lung disease. Some of the artists are natives of the U.S. coal mining region while others have less direct ties. Both vintage recordings and contemporary music have been combined with detailed liner notes giving context to both the songs and the artists. Musicologist Archie Green adds a "Sanctus" note to Wright's "Introduction."

In the preliminary round of nominations for the 50th Grammy Awards the boxed set was under consideration for a number of awards, including, Best Recording Package, Best Liner Notes and Best Historical Album. The compilation did not, however, make it the final round of nominees.

== Track listing ==
=== Volume one ===
1. "Down in a Coal Mine (Excerpt)" - 1:25
  - The Edison Concert Band
2. "Mining Camp Blues" - 2:59
  - Trixie Smith
3. "Sprinkle Coal Dust on My Grave" - 2:46
  - Orville J. Jenks
4. "Coal Miner's Blues" - 3:04
  - The Carter Family
5. "Hard Times in Coleman’s Mine" - 2:36
  - Aunt Molly Jackson
6. "He’s Only a Miner Killed in the Ground" - 2:35
  - Ted Chestnut
7. "Coal Black Mining Blues" - 1:13
  - Nimrod Workman
8. "‘31 Depression Blues" - 2:52
  - Ed Sturgill
9. "Prayer of a Miner's Child" - 1:51
  - Dock Boggs
10. "That Twenty-Five Cents You Paid" - 2:25
  - Sarah Ogan Gunning
11. "The L & N Don’t Stop Here Anymore" - 3:10
  - Jean Ritchie
12. "Dark as a Dungeon" - 1:55
  - Merle Travis
13. "Come All You Coal Miners" - 2:21
  - Reel World String Band
14. "My Sweetheart’s the Mule in the Mines" - 0:22
  - Mike Kline
15. "Thirty Inch Coal" - 2:36
  - Hobo Jack Adkins
16. "Black Waters" - 3:38
  - Jim Ringer
17. "Roof Boltin’ Daddy" - 2:26
  - Gene Carpenter
18. "Dream of a Miner’s Child" - 2:46
  - Carter Stanley
19. "Coal Miner's Boogie" - 2:57
  - George Davis
20. "The Yablonski Murder" - 3:00
  - Hazel Dickens
21. "What Are We Gonna Do?" - 3:01
  - Dorothy Myles
22. "Explosion at Derby Mine" - 4:02
  - Charlie Maggard
23. "Blind Fiddler" - 3:05
  - Jim “Bud” Stanley
24. "Loadin’ Coal" - 2:29
  - John Hutchison
25. "Coal Town Saturday Night" - 3:06
  - Randall Hylton
26. "It’s Been a Long Time" - 3:15
  - Sonny Houston & Roger Hall
27. "Fountain Filled with Blood" - 3:56
  - Elder James Caudill & Choir

=== Volume two ===
1. "West Virginia Mine Disaster" - 2:48
  - Molly Slemp
2. "Union Man" - 3:36
  - Blue Highway
3. "Blue Diamond Mines" - 4:26
  - Robin & Linda Williams
4. "Set Yourself Free" - :50
  - Billy Gene Mullins
5. "Redneck War" - 5:22
  - Ron Short
6. "Sixteen Tons" - 2:32
  - Ned Beatty
7. "There Will Be No Black Lung in Heaven" - 2:05
  - Rev. Joe Freeman
8. "Deep Mine Blues" - 3:45
  - Nick Stump
9. "I’m a Coal Mining Man" - 2:22
  - Tom T. Hall
10. "Dirty Black Coal" - 4:27
  - Kenneth Davis
11. "Black Lung" - 3:21
  - AJ Roach
12. "Coal Dust Kisses" - 4:06
  - Suzanne Mumpower-Johnson
13. "Coal Tattoo" (Billy Edd Wheeler) - 4:06
  - Dale Jett
14. "A Strip Miner’s Life" - 3:00
  - Don Stanley & Middle Creek
15. "Daddy’s Dinner Bucket" - 3:26
  - Ralph Stanley II
16. "In Those Mines" - 3:43
  - Valerie Smith
17. "Miner’s Prayer" - 3:14
  - Ralph Stanley & Dwight Yoakam
18. "Dyin’ To Make A Livin’" - 3:47
  - W.V. Hill (of Foddershock)
19. "You’ll Never Leave Harlan Alive" - 6:06
  - Darrell Scott
20. "They Can’t Put It Back" - 2:31
  - Jack Wright
21. "Which Side Are You On?" - 5:04
  - Natalie Merchant

== Further reading/listening ==
- "Music of Coal rings so true" by Cheryl Truman, Lexington Herald Leader, October 25, 2007
- "CD Celebrates Music from the Coal Mines" by Melissa Block, All Things Considered, NPR, September 3, 2007
- Archie Green, Only a Miner: Studies in Recorded Coal-Mining Songs (University of Illinois Press, 1972).
