= Corofin (parish) =

Catholic parish in County Clare, Ireland

- Roman Catholic parish
- Location in Ireland
- Coordinates: 52°56′43″N 9°03′43″W
- Country: Ireland
- Province: Munster
- County: County Clare
- Time zone: UTC+0 (WET)
  - Summer (DST): UTC-1 (IST (WEST))

Corofin is a parish in County Clare, Ireland, and part of the Roman Catholic Diocese of Killaloe. The parish is an amalgamation of the medieval parishes of Rath and Kilnaboy (or Killinaboy). At least since 1731, both parishes have been administered by one priest.

As of 2024, the parish priest is Des Hillary, with Pat O'Neil as assistant priest.

The main church of the parish is the Church of St. Brigid in Corofin, completed in 1823. This is possibly the first Catholic church in County Clare designed by an architect.

The second church of the parish is the "Church of St. Joseph" in Kilnaboy. This church was built in 1967. It replaced a barn church built in 1846 (now a garage). Tradition says that this barn church replaced a mass house built in 1725.

The third church of the parish is St. Mary in the townland of Roxton, part of the former parish of Rath. This church was built in 1869 and replaced an older church in the townland of Liscullaun.

== Parish of Rath ==
The ecclesiastical parish of Rath was rather peculiar, as it had never any settlement but was entirely rural. The correct name was Rathblathmaic, as it derived its name from de rath of St. Blathmaic. It comprised the Túath of the Ui Flaithri, a subtribe of the Dal gCais.

== Gallery ==
Parish of Kilnaboy (renamed Corofin)

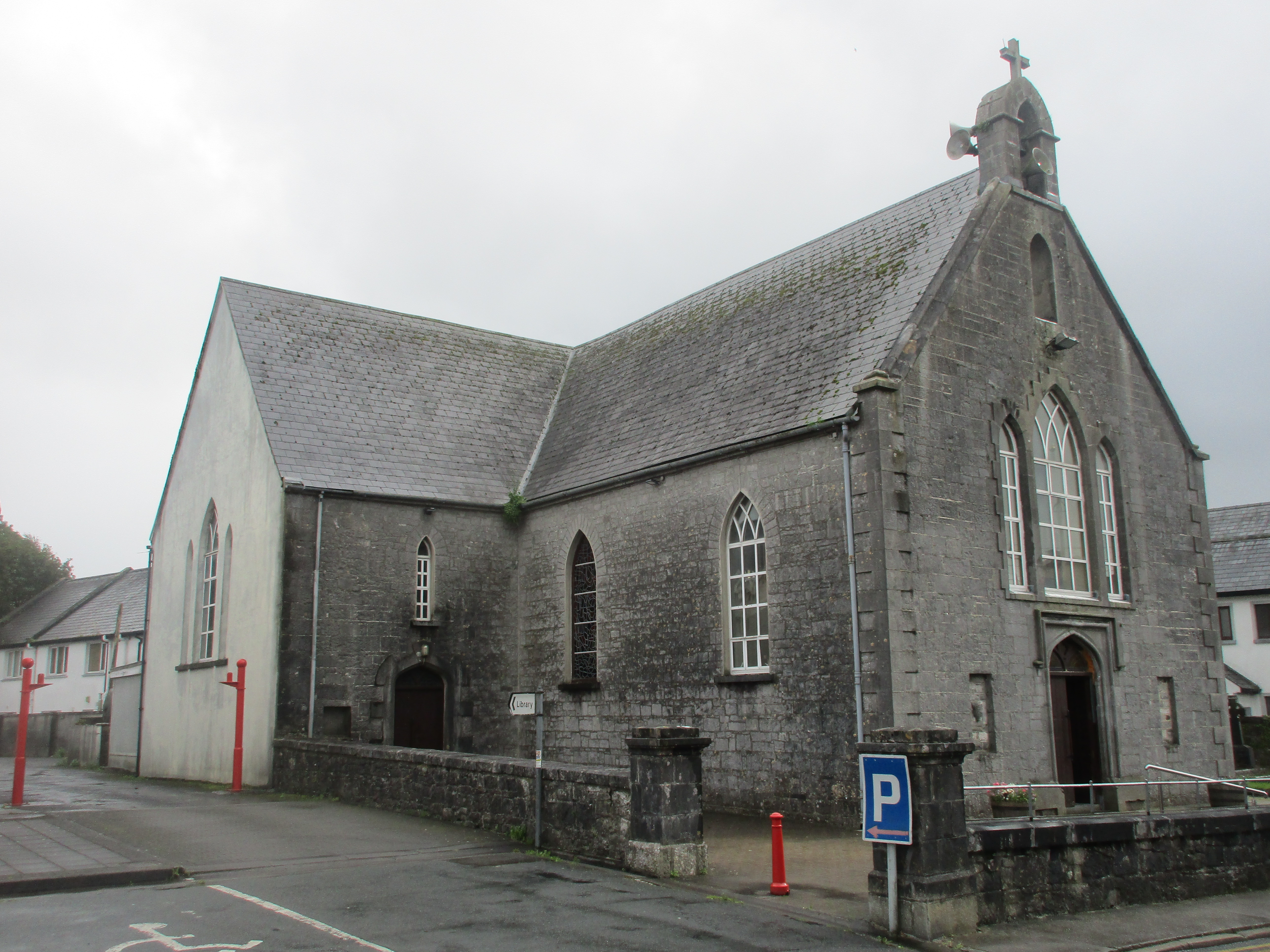
St. Brigid's Church, Corofin

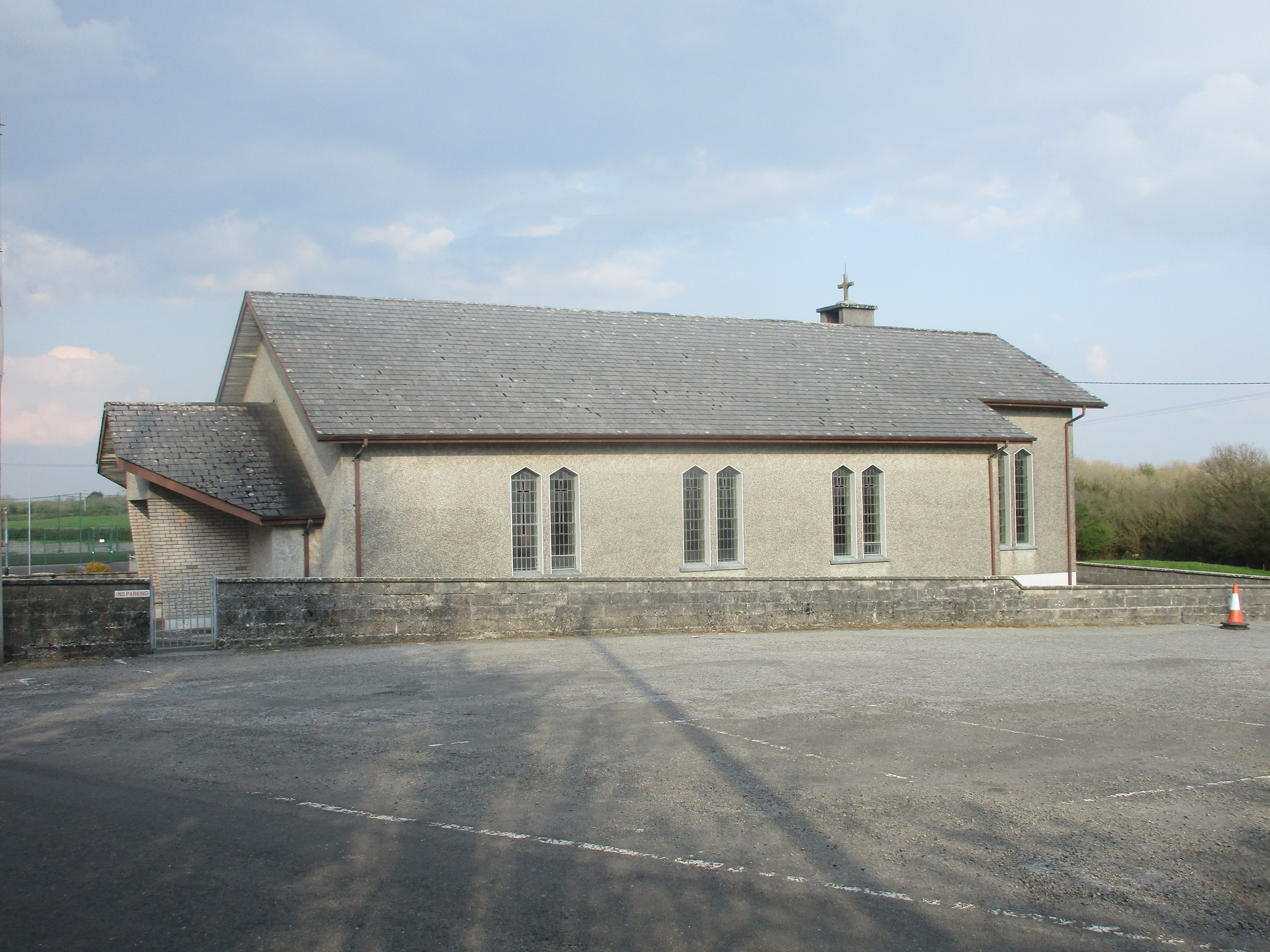
Church of St. Joseph, Kilnaboy

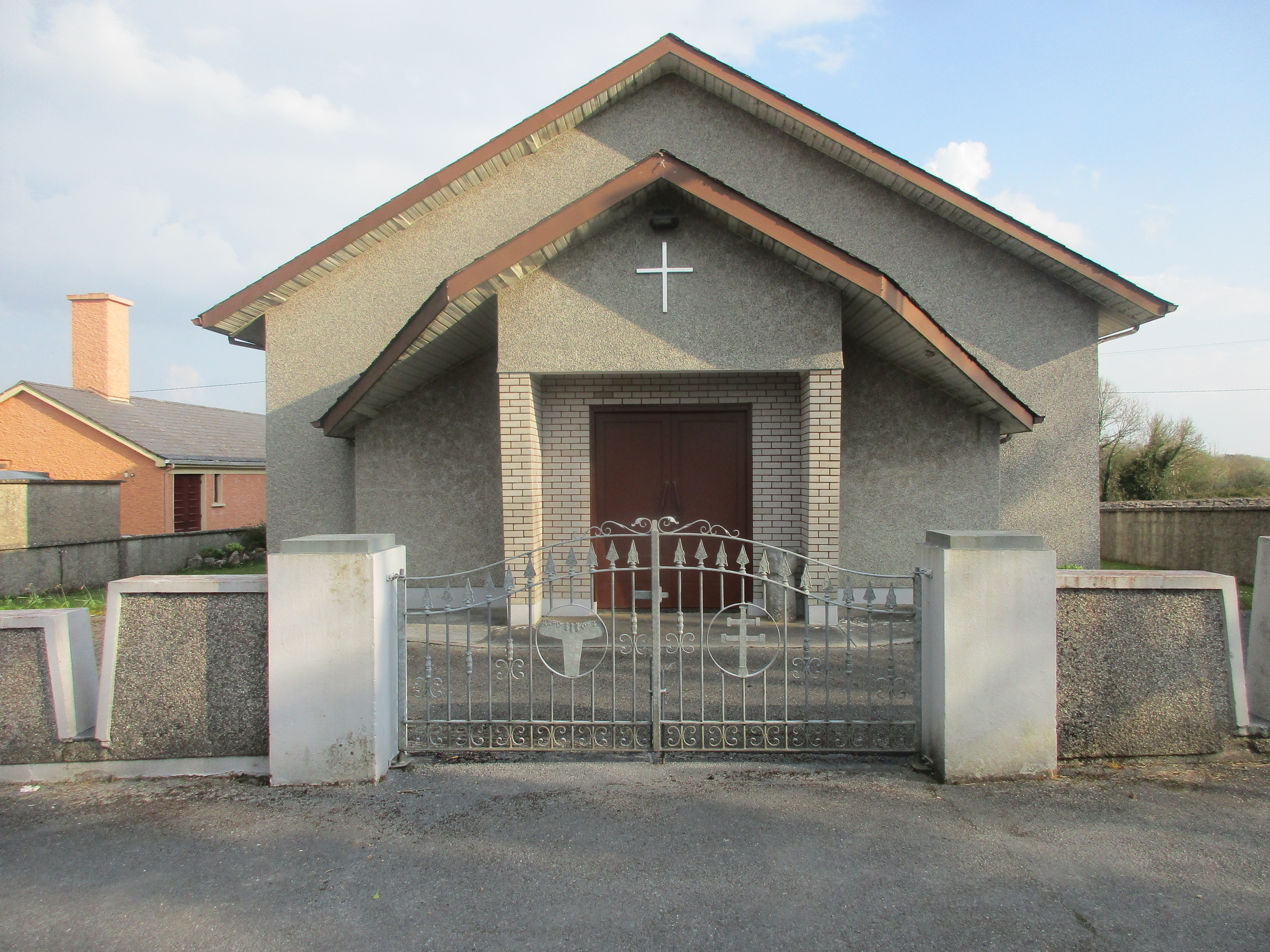
Main entrance of the Church of St. Joseph, Kilnaboy

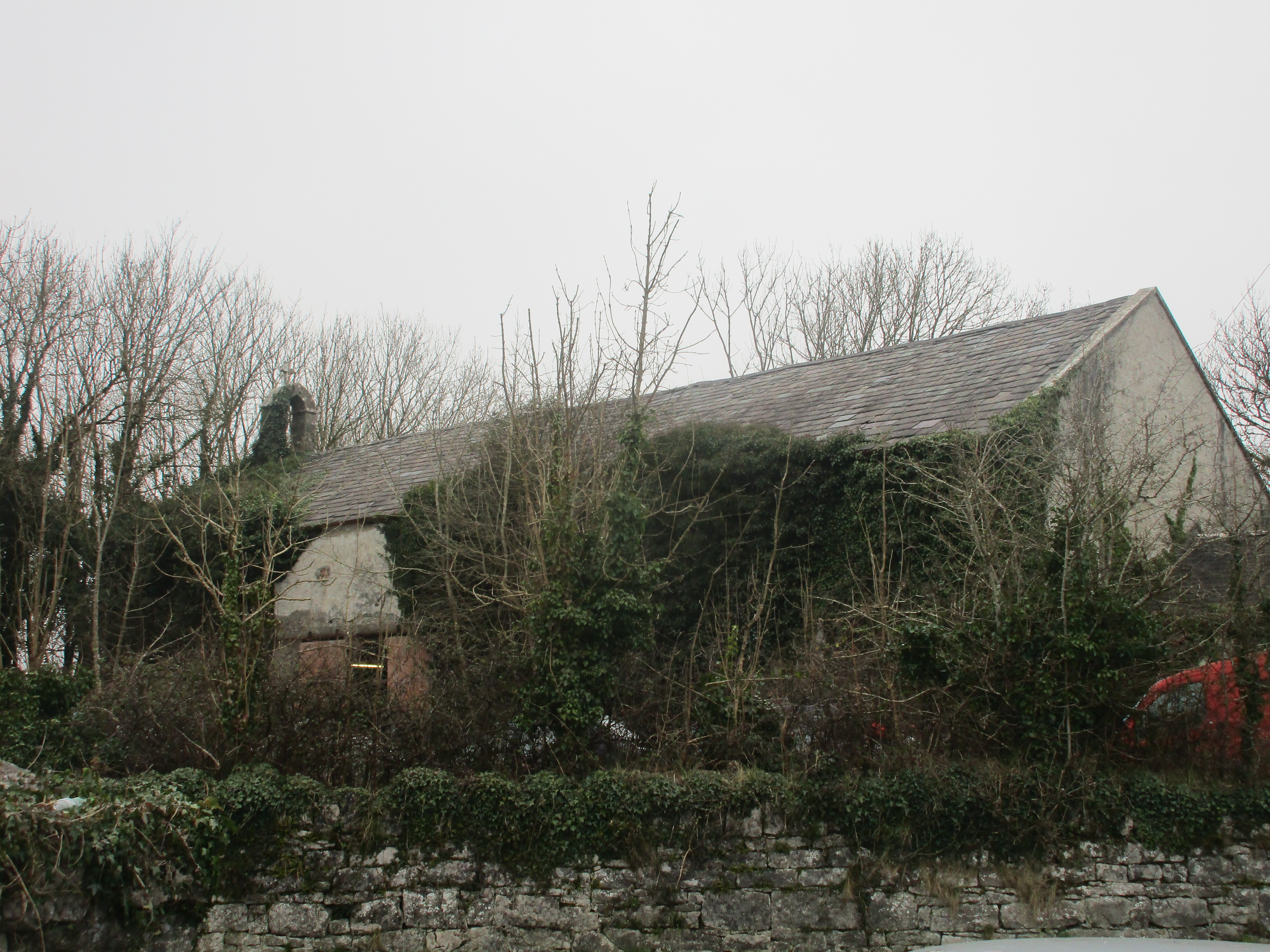
Barn church in Kilnaboy, predecessor of the Church of St. Joseph. Now a garage.

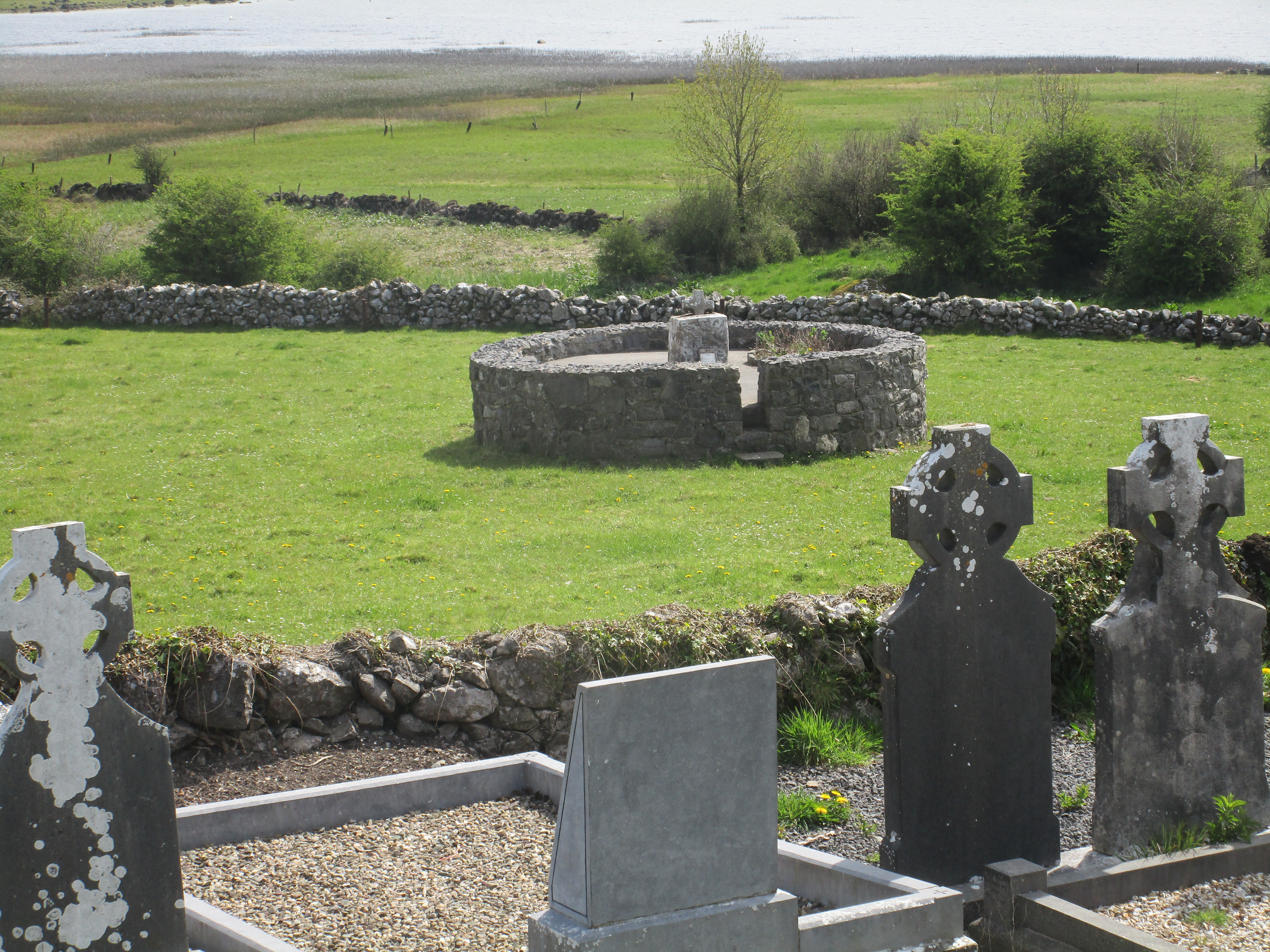
Remains of the early monastic site in Kilvoydan, close to Corofin

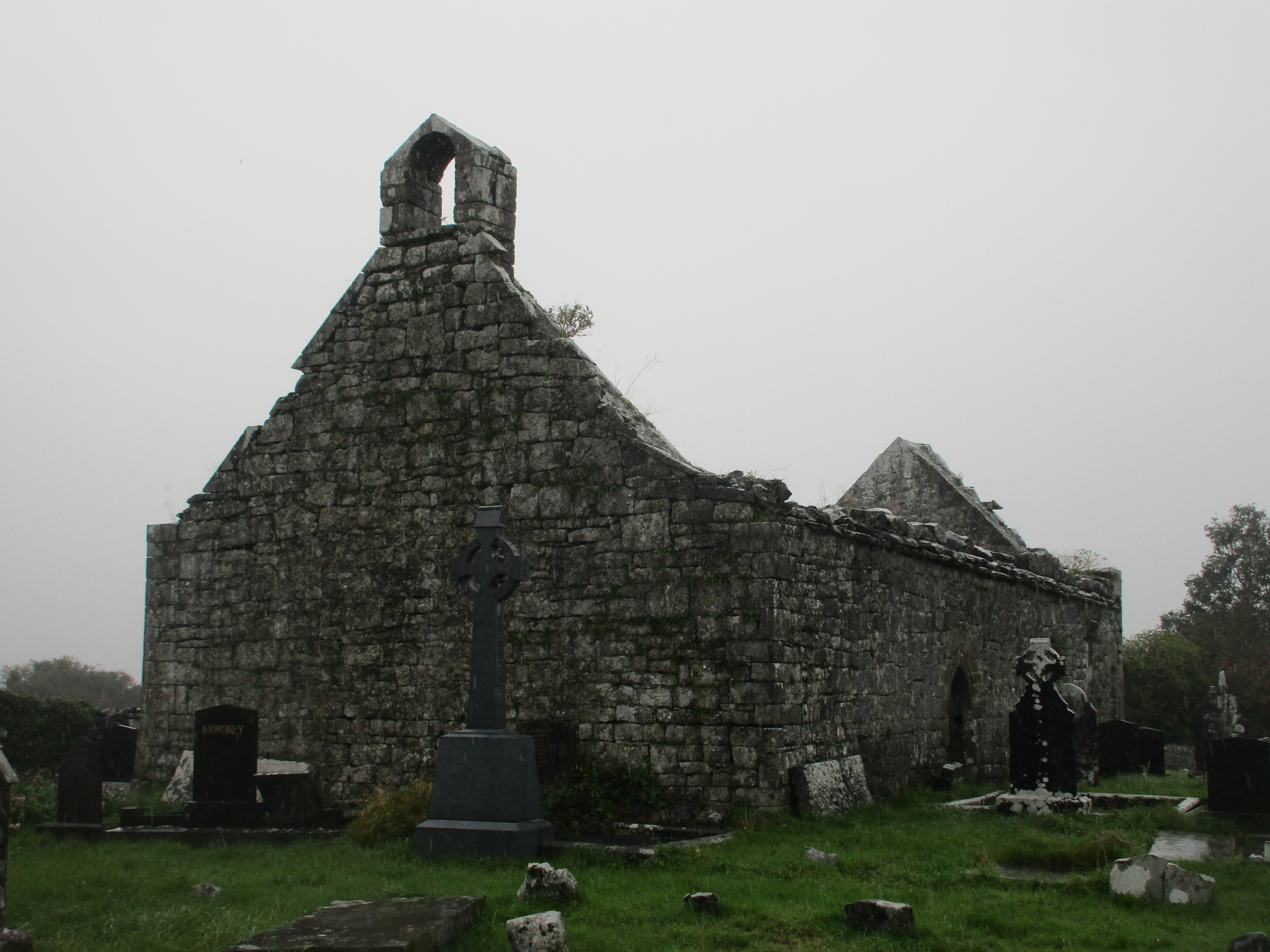
Ruin of Coad Church

Former parish of Rath

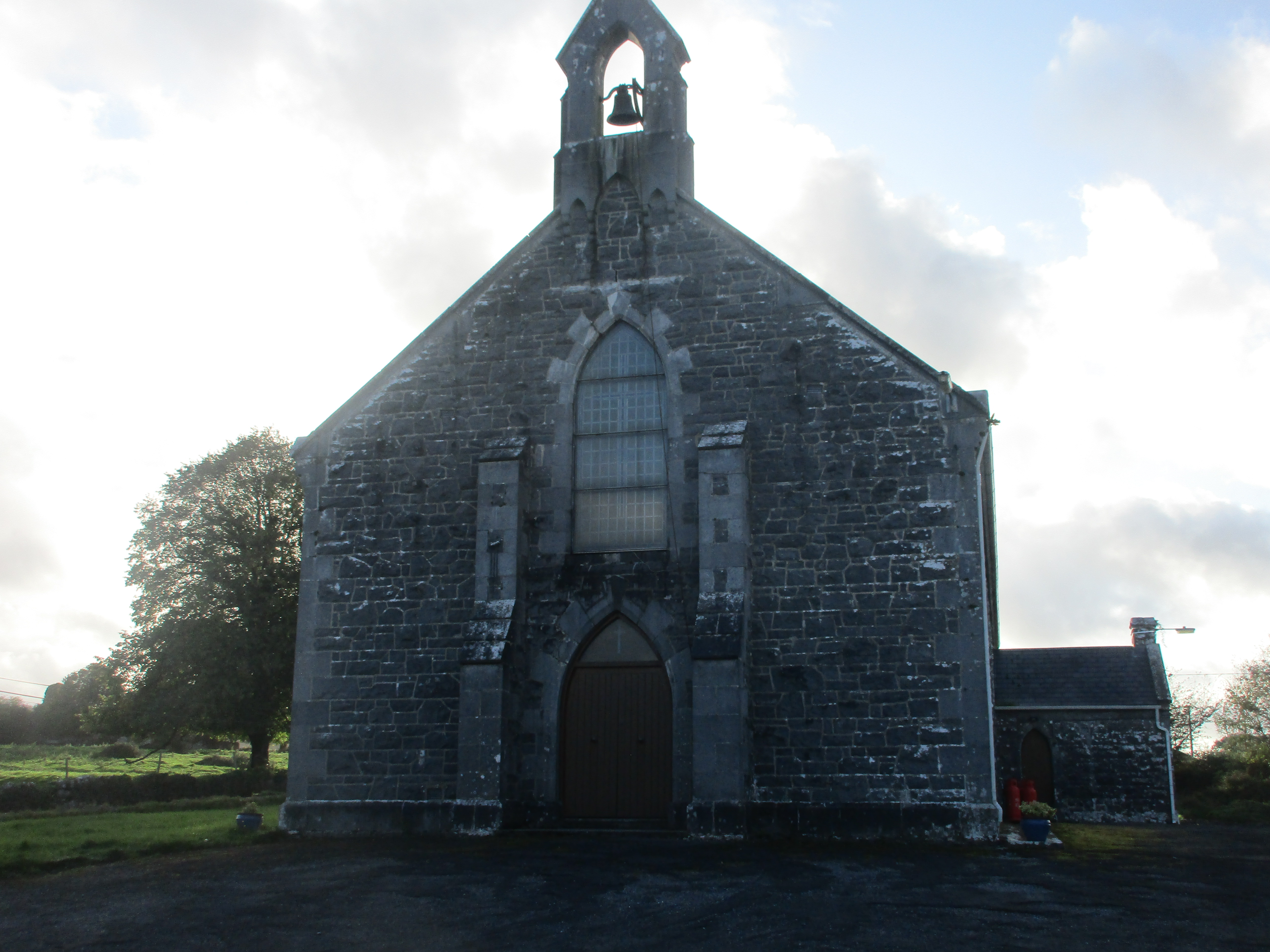
St. Mary's Church, Roxton

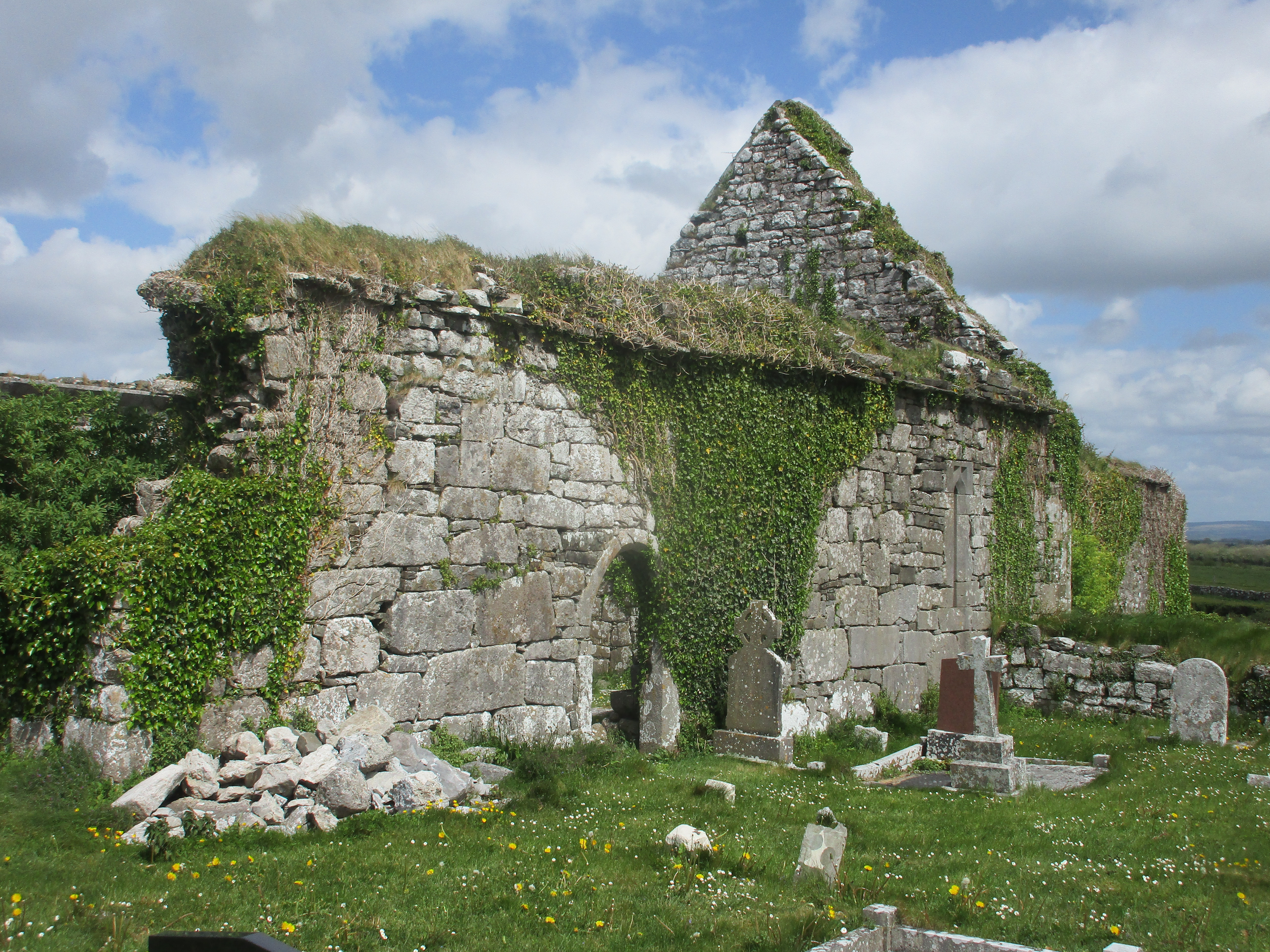
The Church of Rath Blaithmaic

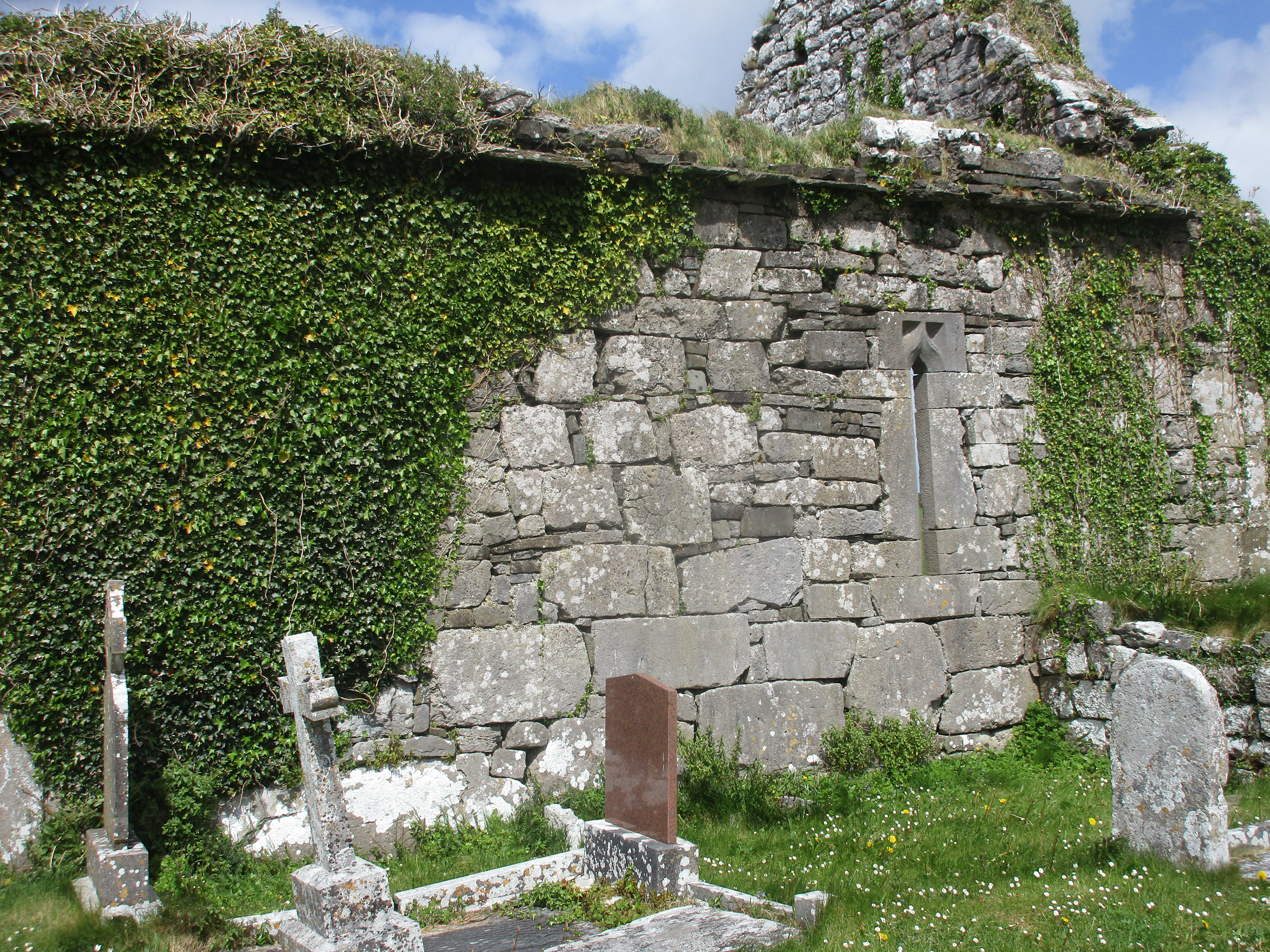
The present ruin of the Church of Rath Blaithmaic is mainly 15th century, but the big stones at the bottom are reused stones from an earlier church.

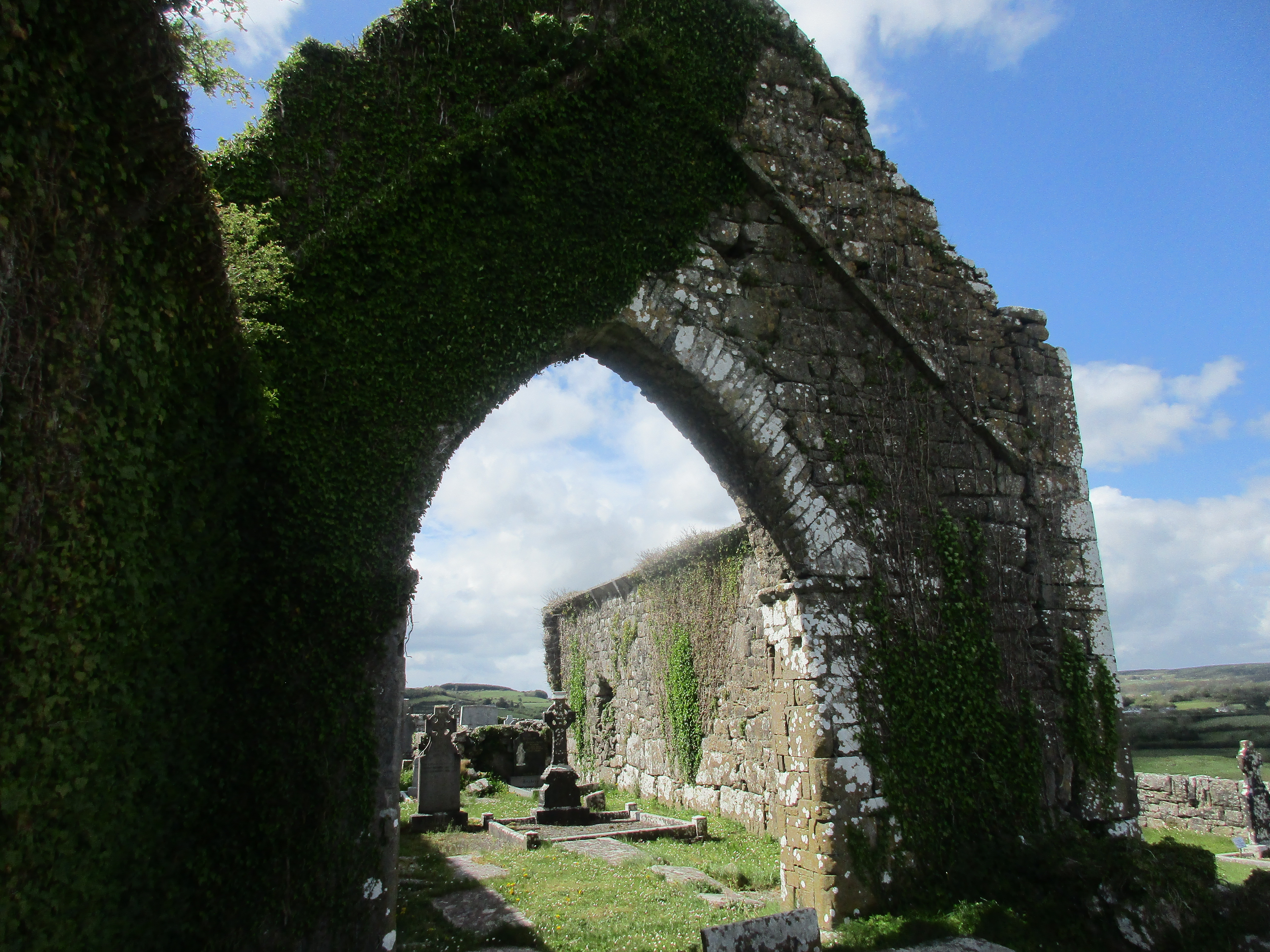
Nave and chancel

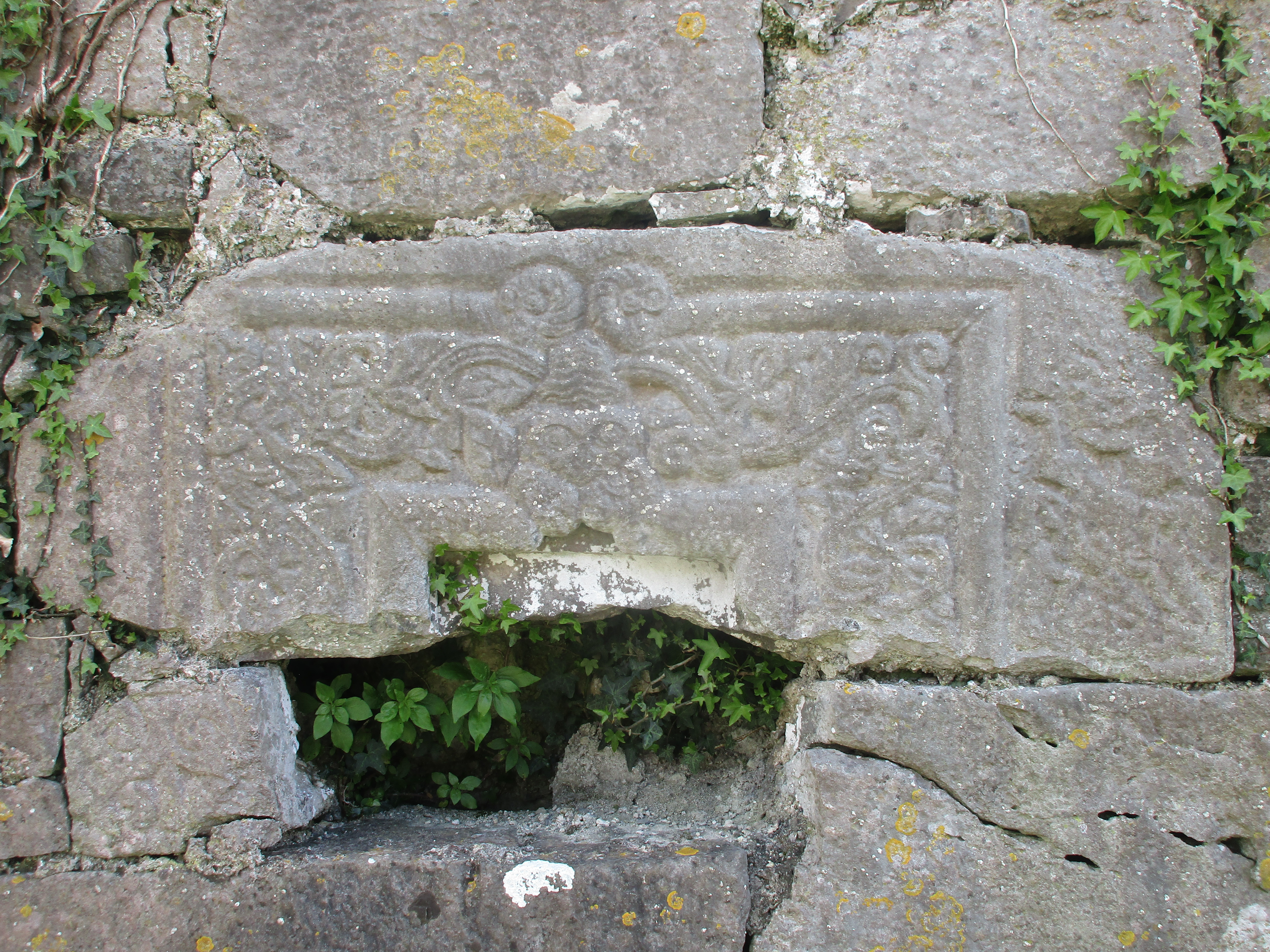
A Sheela na gig, often seen as a fertility symbol. Placed upside down.

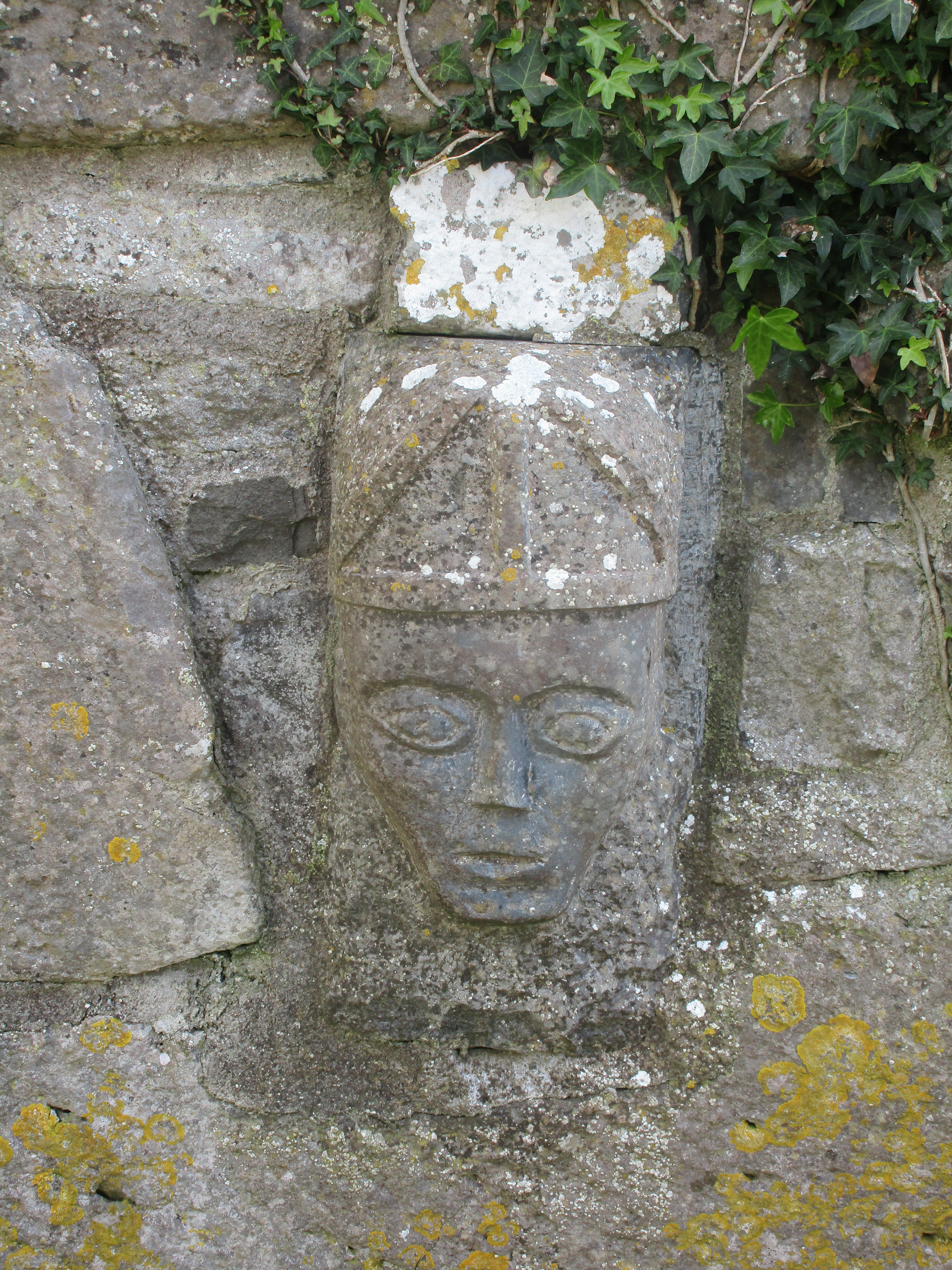
Carved head on the inner wall.
