= Shaskeen =

Irish traditional musical group

Shaskeen are a musical group based in Ireland, who perform Irish traditional music. They formed in London in May 1970 and were still performing and recording as of 2026.

The band currently consists of Eamonn Cotter (flute, tin whistle), Tom Cussen (banjo, mandolin), Geraldine Cotter (tin whistle, piano), Patsy McDonagh (accordion), Katie Theasby (singer, flute), Dave Sanders (fiddle), Mary Liddy (concertina), and Johnny Donnellan (bodhran).

== Discography ==
=== Albums ===
A mostly-complete list of the band's albums is maintained at the band's own Web site. Additional details and additional albums are provided below.

In chronological order:

- The Shaskeen, Release Records BRL 4053, 1974.

Personnel: PJ Hernon (chromatic accordion), Eddie Maloney (concert flute, flageolet and violin), Paddy McMahon (violin), Tom Cussen (banjo), Benny O'Connor (drummer), John Dooley (guitarist and singer), Carl Hession (piano).
Contents: The Shaskeen / Lady Ann Montgomery / Morrison's reel / Eileen Curran; Tommy Mulhair's jig / Castletown Connors / House in the glen; Kylebrack ramblers / Graf Spee / Shanagolden; Ricks rambles / Pleasure of Hope / Tie the bonnet / Lucy Campbell / Dunne Hills; Blacksmith's anvil / Bucks of Oranmore / Crosses of Annagh; Geese in the bog / Basket of turf; Banna strand; Devaney's goat / Dogs among the bushes; The rambling pitch fork / Maids of Glenmore / Paddy McMahon's jig; St. Ruth's bush / Fox hunter's reel / Scotch Mary.

- Green Groves of Erin. Traditional Irish Music and Song, Release Records XRL5001, 1975.

Personnel: With John Dooley (English vocals).

- The Dawn, Release Records, 1976.

Contents: Maid Of Athlone (or Enchanted Lady); Holyland / Hunter's Purse; Turn The Bellows Quickly / Turn Up The Tables; One Misty Moisty Morning; The Banks / Pound Hill; The Dawn / Paddy Lynn's Delight; Pretty Saro; The Boy In The Gap / The Humours Of Scarriff; The Gold Ring / The Night Of The Wedding; Chattering Magpie / Flax In Bloom / Paddy Kelly's; Mattie Groves; O'Rourkes / Wild Irishman; Sally Brown / Pat Burke's; Lord Gordon's / Lord McDonald's; Mooncoin / Queen Of The Fair; Moving Cloud / Dowd's Favourite.

- The Ash Plant, Release Records XRL5005, 1978.

Personnel:Tom Cussen(banjo) Benny O'Connor(drums) John Dooley (English vocals), John Walsh (accordion), Seán Conway (flute), and guests Mark Gregory (guitar), Carl Hession (piano).

- Traditional Irish Music, Release Records, [1978?]. Audiocassette, 12 tracks.

Personnel: Tom Cussen (banjo, mandolin); Charlie Harris (accordion); Benny O'Connor (drums); Mike Fahy (guitar, vocals).

- The Joys of Life. Jigs, Reels, Hornpipes and Songs, Faoileann Records FA3502, 1983. Co-published as G.T.D. Heritage Recording.

Personnel: Tom Cussen http://www.banjo.ie (banjo, mandolin); Benny O'Connor (drums, bodhran, bongos); Seán Conway (flute, whistle, guitar, vocals); Mike Fahy (guitar, vocals); Charlie Harris (accordion).
Contents: 1. Joys of Life - 2. Boy in the Anderson's (reel) - 3. Ballroom Favourites (barn dances) - 4. Shawl of Galway Grey (song) - 5. Turnpike Gate; Ten Pound Flout (reels) - 6. Banks of Lough Gowna; John Brennan's; Sligo Reel (medley) - 7. Volunteer;Ships are Sailing; Redhaired Lass (reel) - 8. Morning Dew; Cooley's Earl's Chair (reels) - 9. McCarthy's; Lawson's (hornpipes) - 10. May Morning Dew (song) - 11. Strike the Gay Harp; Tailor's Wedding (jigs) - 12. New Policeman; London Lassies (reels) - 13. High Germany (song) - 14. Pigeon on the Gate; The Foxhunters (reels).

- Atlantic Breeze, Faoileann Records CDFA3504, 1988.
  - Reissue: Atlantic Breeze, Trend Studios CDFA 3504, 1995.
- The Mouse behind the Dresser, Faoileann Records CDFA 3505, 1990.
- My Love Is in America, GTD Heritage Music CD 072, 1993. The tray label on that disc claims: "This is Shaskeen's sixth album." For more information, personnel, and a verified contents listing, see its irishtune.info Album Info page.
- Music for Set Dancing Vol.1. Faoileann Records CDFA3502/06, 1994.
  - Reissue: Music for Set Dancing and Listening, Trend Studios CDFA 3502/06, 1997. For further details, personnel, and a verified contents listing, see its irishtune.info Album Info page
- 25th Silver Jubilee Collection, GTD Heritage Music HCD140 or CDFA 3509, 1995.
- Irish Traditional Music and Song, released 1 October 1995 on the Outlet label.
- A Collection of Jigs and Reels, released 13 July 1998 on the Hallmark label.
- Irish Pub Session, released 4 January 2000.

=== DVD ===
Shaskeen: Irish Pub Session, released 16 May 2006 on the Doonaree label.
