= Mia Birdsong =

American family activist

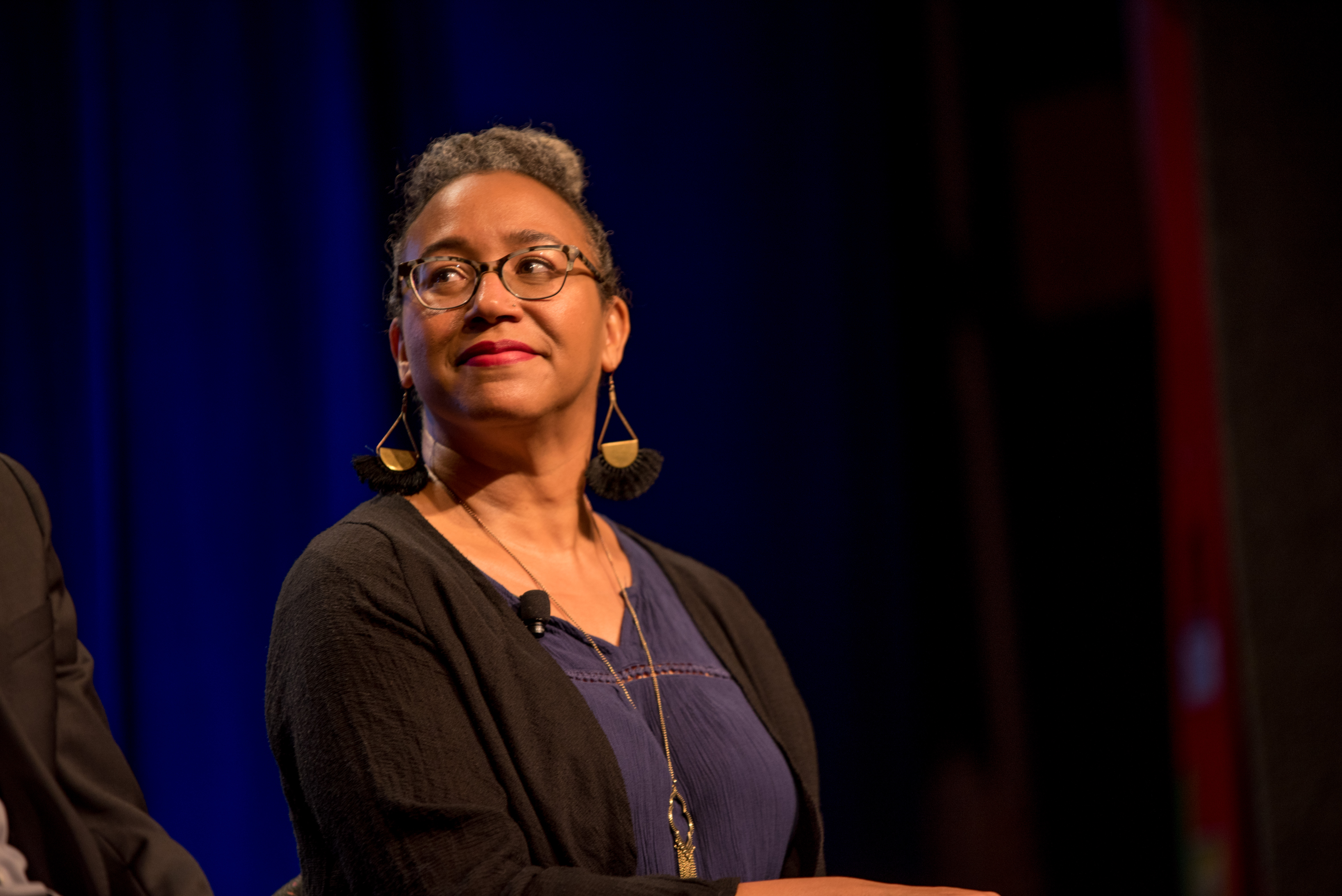
Birdsong in 2017

Mia Birdsong is a family activist who advocates for the strengthening of communities and the self-determination of low-income people. Birdsong is co-director of Family Story, alongside Nicole Rodgers and was vice president of Family Independence Initiative (FII).

== Background ==
As a child, she didn't see herself represented in the world, particularly in the literary world. There was no one of color in the school books that she was reading. This made it difficult to connect with the characters in these stories. Birdsong believed that books like the Nancy Drew series and those written by Judy Blume drew on gender invisibility, but not race. When Birdsong was a senior in high school, she read Richard Wright's Black Boy. Though the book wasn't assigned for students to read, Birdsong chose it for her AP English class. Another influence was Public Enemy's It Takes a Nation of Millions to Hold Us Back. With the birth of her first child in 2005, Birdsong wanted to ensure that her daughter saw herself reflected in the world around her.

Birdsong is married to musician, recording artist, songwriter, and producer Nino Moschella, who also runs a recording studio. They live in Oakland, CA with their two children. She is on the board of directors of the North Oakland Community Charter School and Forward Together.

== Education ==
Birdsong is a graduate of Oberlin College and an Ascend Fellow of the Aspen Institute. She sits on the Board of Directors of the Tannery World Dance & Cultural Center and the North Oakland Community Charter School. She spent four years majoring in Black Studies.

== Work ==
Birdsong previously served as Vice President of the Family Independence Initiative (FII), an organization dedicated to supporting the self-determination of low-income people and communities. At FII, she created and curated the Torchlight Prize, an award for groups of regular people working together to strengthen their own communities. She has spent time organizing to abolish prisons, teaching teenagers about sex and drugs, interviewing literary luminaries like Edwidge Danticat, David Foster Wallace, and John Irving, and attending births as a midwifery apprentice. Birdsong also co-founded Canerow, a resource for people dedicated to raising children of color in a world that reflects the spectrum of who they are. She advocates for strong families and communities, and the self-determination of everyday people. She is an inaugural Ascend Fellow of the Aspen Institute. She is also a New America California Fellow.

Birdsong is the Co-Director of Family Story, while also spending time in the publishing industry and worked as a trainer and educator in the youth development and heather education field. Her experience also includes apprenticing as a midwife while also studying and practicing herbal medicine and building houses.

Birdsong is the author of “How we show up: Reclaiming Family, Friendship, and Community," published in 2020. In the book Birdsong discusses the need to build communities that are more equitable, just and healthy.
