= Humdinger (computer) =

8-bit computer introduced in 1983

Humdinger Color Computer
- Manufacturer: Venture Micro, Inc
- Type: Home computer
- Released: 1983; 43 years ago
- Introductory price: US$129.95
- CPU: Zilog Z80
- Memory: 4 KB expandable to 64 KB
- Removable storage: Cartridge
- Display: 256×192 pixels, 8 colors
- Sound: 4 channels, 5 octaves
- Connectivity: Joystick port, Centronics, RS-232,

The Humdinger Color Computer was an 8-bit home computer introduced in 1983 by Venture Micro, Inc., of Cupertino, California.

It had the following specifications:

- Zilog Z80 microprocessor
- 4 KB of main memory (expandable to 64 KB)
- 58-key, chiclet-style keyboard with rubber keys
- A 256×192 pixel, 8 color display with 12 modes
- 4 channel, 5 octaves sound
- Centronics parallel printer interface
- RS-232 serial port
- Joystick port
- Cartridge port

A view of the Humdinger motherboard including bodged wiring. Unknown if this is a production model.

The original retail price was US$129.95. It made its first appearance at the eighth annual West Coast Computer Faire, held from March 18 to March 20, 1983. It was released to retailers in the United States in mid-May 1983. Intended as a ZX Spectrum killer, the Humdinger computer proved short-lived in the marketplace, as Venture Micro dissolved in 1984.
