= Enda Scahill =

Irish musician and songwriter

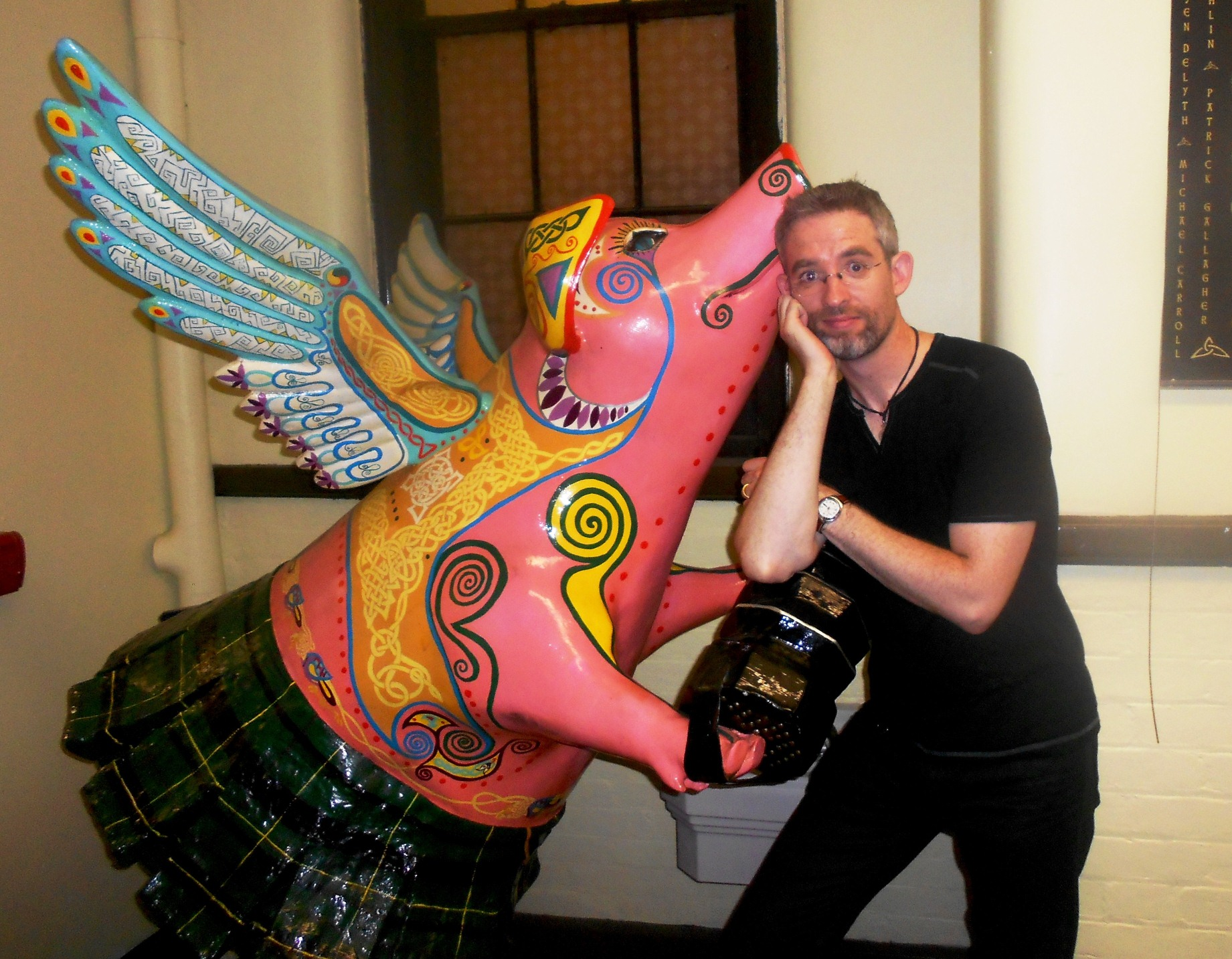
- Scahill in Cincinnati

Background information
- Born: Corofin, County Galway, Ireland
- Genres: Irish traditional, bluegrass, Celtgrass
- Occupations: Musician; songwriter
- Instruments: Banjo; mandolin; tenor guitar
- Label: Compass
- Member of: Gadan
- Formerly of: The Brock McGuire Band; We Banjo 3
- Award: Steve Martin Banjo Award
- Website: endascahill.com

Enda Scahill is an Irish banjo and mandolin player from Corofin, County Galway. He is a four-time All-Ireland Champion and has performed with The Fureys, Frankie Gavin and The Chieftains. He is a former member of The Brock McGuire Band. In 2006, he released the album Humdinger with Paul Brock, which was awarded Irish Music Album of the Year by The Irish Times and released by Compass Records in Nashville, Tennessee.

Scahill is a founding member of the band We Banjo 3 alongside Martin Howley, David Howley, and his brother Fergal Scahill. Earle Hitchner, music writer for The Wall Street Journal, described We Banjo 3's playing as a "freshness and finesse bordering on the magical," and LiveIreland proclaimed them "the hottest group in Irish music."

In 2024, Scahill joined the roots and trad band Gadan, performing across major U.S. festivals including Milwaukee Irish Fest and the Dublin Irish Festival. He recorded on the band's 2025 album May the Divil Tune Your Banjo, which was reviewed in the December 2025 issue of Irish Music Magazine. Scahill was also featured in an extensive interview in the August 2025 issue of the magazine discussing the album and their U.S. tour.

== Discography ==
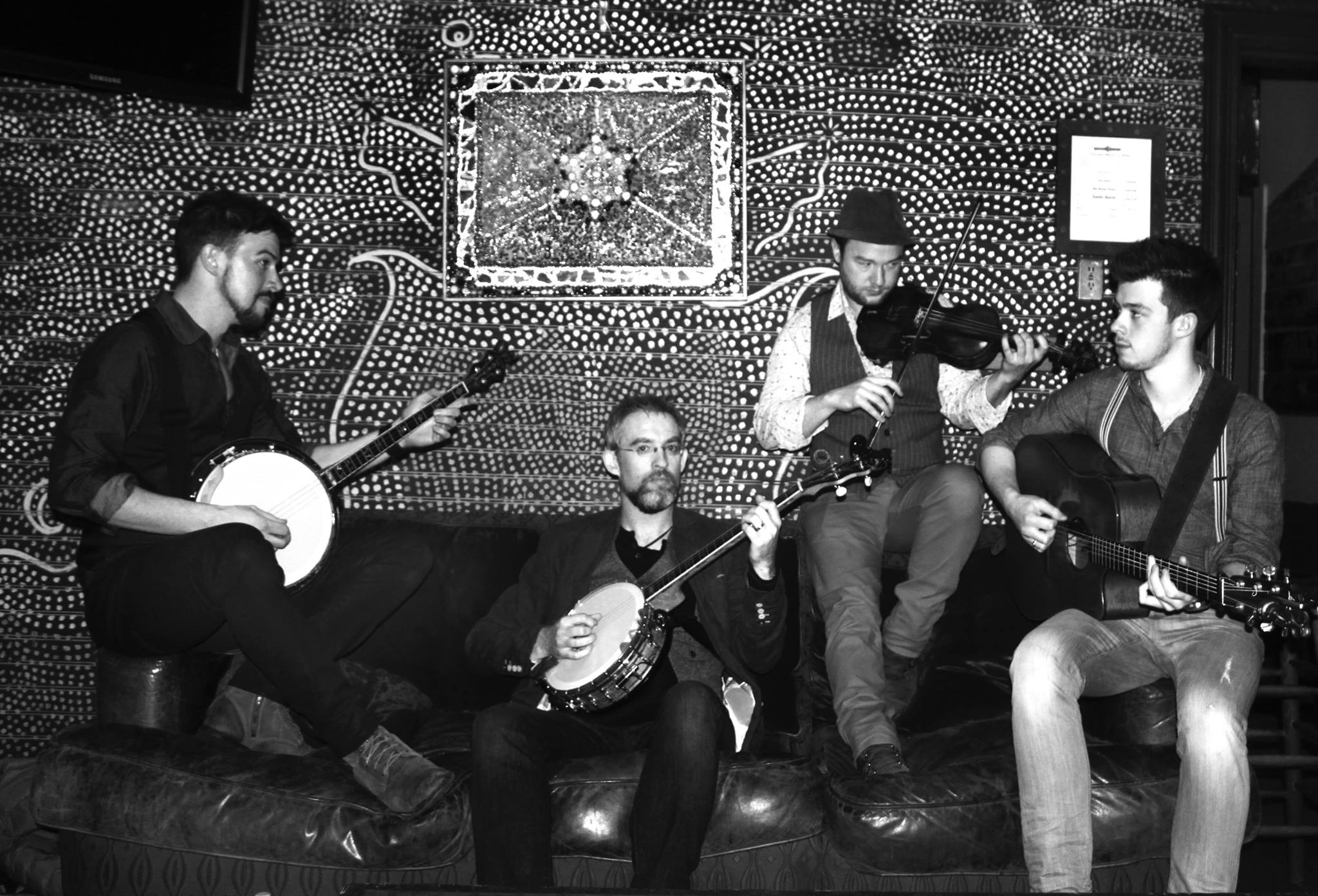
L to R: Martin, Enda, Fergal, and David backstage at the House of Blues, Chicago

=== Solo & Duo ===
- Pick It Up (2000)
- Humdinger (with Paul Brock, 2006)
- The Dark Well (with Joel Andersson, 2025)

=== With Brock McGuire Band ===
- Brock McGuire Band (2004)
- Humdinger (2006)

=== With We Banjo 3 ===
- Roots of the Banjo Tree (2012)
- Gather the Good (2014)
- Live in Galway (2015)
- String Theory (2016)
- Haven (2018)
- Roots to Rise (2019)
- Open the Road (2022)

=== With Gadan ===
- May The Divil Tune Your Banjo (2025)
