= Paul Brock (musician) =

Irish button accordionist

Paul Brock is an Irish button accordionist born in Athlone now residing in Ennis. In May 1989, Brock co-founded the group Moving Cloud with fiddle player, Manus McGuire. In 2001 he co-founded the new group The Brock McGuire Band also with Manus McGuire. In 2004, Brock was voted Best Male Musician by the Irish American News. His 2007 album Humdinger with Enda Scahill, released by Compass Records, was voted Irish Music Album of The Year by the Irish Times.

== Discography ==
Solo/Duet

- Ómós do Joe Cooley (Tribute to Joe Cooley) (with Frankie Gavin) (1986)
- Mo Chairdin (1992)
- Humdinger (with Enda Scahill) (2007)

with Moving Cloud

- Moving Cloud (1995)
- Foxglove (1998)

with Brock McGuire Band

- Brock McGuire Band (2004)
- Green Grass Blue Grass (with Ricky Skaggs) (2011)

Guest appearances

- Hands Across The Water (A Benefit For The Children Of The Tsunami) (2006)
