= Noe Venable =

American singer-songwriter (born 1976)

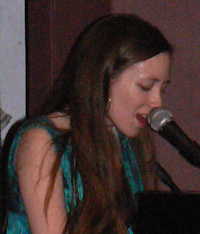
- Noe Venable at Ectofest 2007

Background information
- Born: April 20, 1976; San Francisco, California, U.S.
- Genres: Indie folk, indie rock, experimental, New Weird America
- Occupations: Singer, songwriter
- Instruments: Vocals, guitar, piano, Celtic harp
- Website: www.noevenable.com

Noe Venable (born April 20, 1976) is an experimental folk/pop singer-songwriter. She has earned a loyal fan base in her native San Francisco, in part through frequently performing in small, intimate venues. Her advocacy of small venues caused a stir in the San Francisco music community when she took San Francisco Chronicle reporter Joel Selvin to task for claiming that the city's music scene was "dead".

== Education ==
Venable attended Bennington College as a Dramatic Writing and then a Music major before deciding to pursue music as a career. In 2004, Venable moved to Brooklyn, New York where she obtained a bachelor's degree at Hunter College of the City University of New York. In 2007, she relocated to Boston, Massachusetts to begin graduate studies at Harvard Divinity School.

== Theatrical career ==
She performed in numerous theatrical and musical productions as a youth with the San Francisco-based Young People's Teen Musical Theater Company. She was also in the cast of the Lewis Carroll-themed musicals "Right Mind" and "Right Mind is Nowhere" directed by George Coates. Her original one-act play "Annie Beckstead Does Her Homework" won at the Rocky Mountain Student Theater Project in Telluride, Colorado.

== Music career ==
She spent a month opening for Ani DiFranco, and toured with artists as varied as They Might Be Giants, Boz Scaggs and Dar Williams.

Venable continues to compose and perform with longtime-collaborators Todd Sickafoose and Alan Lin. Her songs are noteworthy for their striking melodies and complex subject matter, and she invites comparison with musicians Elliott Smith and Mazzy Star. She is reportedly working on recording new music, has been performing approximately twice per year and has performed most recently in September 2010. In March 2014, Venable completed funding for her album "Cascadia" which was released the same year.

== Music used in film ==
Her music was featured in the 2002 low-budget film Cherish directed by Finn Taylor, and stars Tim Blake Nelson, Robin Tunney, and Liz Phair. The movie was filmed in and around the Berkeley and San Francisco area.

== Discography ==
- You Talking to Me? (1996) – Venable's first recording, produced by Noe Venable and Tom Meshishnek and recorded in Meshishnek's basement, San Francisco. Featuring untraditional percussion including pots and pans, a vegetable steamer, a squeaky oven door, and a metal candy machine.
- No Curses Here (1998) – This recording was produced by Lee Townsend, who produced Bill Frisell and Elvis Costello, and was released by the German independent label, Intuition Music and Media. Arrangements are eclectic but center on acoustic instruments. Alan Lin plays violin, Viktor Krauss (Lyle Lovett) plays acoustic bass, Scott Amendola (T. J. Kirk) plays drums, Rob Burger (Tin Hat Trio) plays keyboards, Ryan Rosenberg plays pedal steel guitar, and Tom Meshishnek plays electric guitar.
- Down Easy (2000) – Live recording of the Noe Venable Trio performing at house concert venue Mo's Melody Mansion in San Francisco, January 20, 2000. (Part of the album's songs were featured in the 2002 movie Cherish.) Featuring Noe Venable (voice & guitar), Todd Sickafoose (acoustic bass), and Alan Lin (violin).
- Boots (2002) – Produced by Venable and Todd Sickafoose, the lyrics explore the meaning of womanhood. Arrangements are dominantly acoustic, and the music is very melodic.
- The World Is Bound by Secret Knots (2003) – Produced by Todd Sickafoose, this is Venable's most well-known work, receiving attention on National Public Radio. Secret Knots was recorded at Eary Canal studios in Oakland, California. Much of the material was written while opening for Ani Difranco, Boz Scaggs, and They Might Be Giants. The album introduces more variety to Noe's songs, including electronic sounds and effects and often a more foreboding sound that hearkens back to some of her earlier work, such as "Jamie Comes Home". There are also some acoustic songs, including "Is the Spirit Here?"
- The Summer Storm Journals (2007)
- Cascadia (2014) – Released in 2014 after being successfully funded by her first Kickstarter campaign, Cascadia is Noe Venable's seventh album, dedicated to the natural world. It was recorded without synthesizers, using only acoustic instruments and the human voice, and its lyrical themes include the beauty of nature, the growing separation between humankind and nature, and the spiritual implications of this increasing separation.
- Gift of Embers (2022) – Featuring songs composed on Celtic harp, an instrument newly added to Noe Venable's repertoire.
