= Corofin, County Galway =

Village in County Galway, Ireland

Corofin Cora Finne
- Village
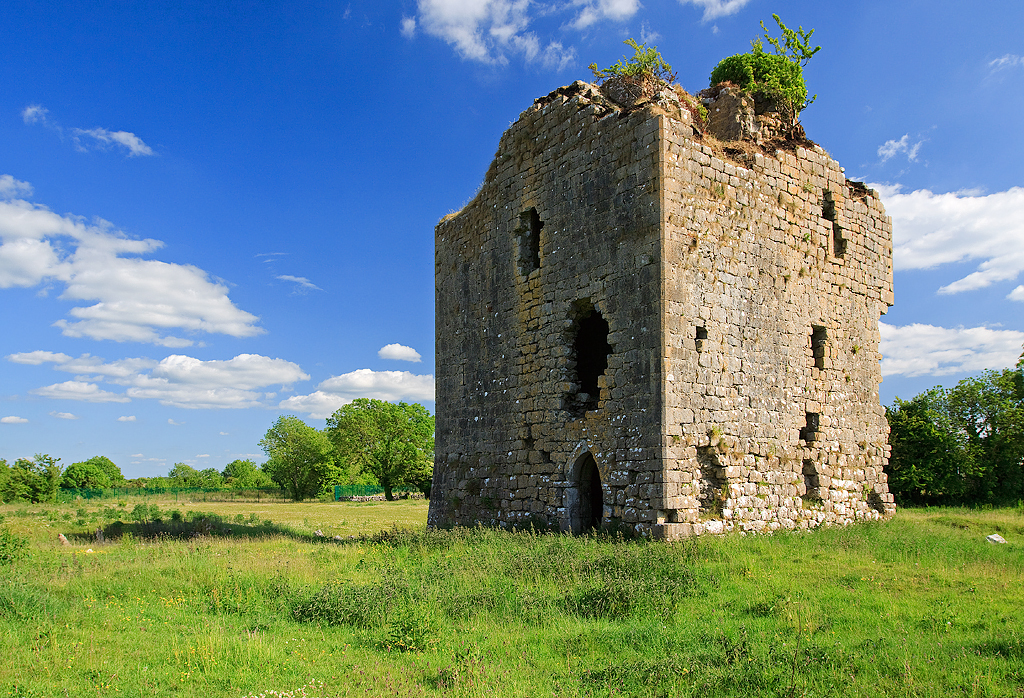
- Corrofin Castle

- Location in Ireland
- Coordinates: 53°25′00″N 8°52′48″W
- Country: Ireland
- Province: Connacht
- County: County Galway
- Elevation: 45 m (148 ft)

Population (2022)
  - Total: 745
- Time zone: UTC+0 (WET)
  - Summer (DST): UTC-1 (IST (WEST))
- Irish Grid Reference: M424434

Corofin or Corrofin (Irish: Cora Finne, meaning 'weir of (the) white one') is a village and parish in County Galway, Ireland, situated on the N17 road between Galway City and Tuam.

== History ==
Corofin Castle is a mid-15th century tower house, now partly in ruins. Corrofin's Roman Catholic church is dedicated to Saint Colman and was built in the 1840s to replace an earlier 18th century chapel.

== Sport ==
The local Gaelic football club, Corofin, have won five All-Ireland Senior Club Football Championships, most recently beating Kilcoo in the 2019-2020 Championship final. They also hold the record for most successive All-Ireland Club Championship titles, winning three-in-a-row between 2017 and 2020. Their team of the 2010s is the most successful, winning the county title seven times, the Connacht Senior Football Championship four times and the All-Ireland Senior Club Championship five times.

Corofin has an athletics team named Corofin AC and a football team named Corofin United.

A Corofin native, Bishop Patrick Duggan of Clonfert, declined the honour of being the first patron of the GAA, giving the honour to the younger man, Archbishop Thomas Croke of Cashel.

== Notable people ==
- Daithí Burke, Gaelic footballer and hurler
- Kieran Fitzgerald, Gaelic footballer
- Eileen Costello O'Shaughnessy, taxi driver who was murdered in 1997
- Enda Scahill, musician

== See also ==
- List of towns and villages in Ireland
