= Corofin GAA =

Corofin GAA may refer to:

- Corofin GAA (Clare), a sports club in Ireland
- Corofin GAA (Galway), a sports club in Ireland
