= Compass Records =

American independent record label

- Founded: 1995
- Founder: Garry West; Alison Brown
- Distributors: AMPED Distribution (physical); Merlin Network (digital)
- Genre: Folk, bluegrass, Celtic, jazz, world music
- Country of origin: U.S.
- Location: Nashville, Tennessee
- Official website: compassrecords.com

Compass Records is an American independent record label founded in 1995 by musicians Garry West and Alison Brown that specializes in folk, bluegrass, Celtic, jazz, and acoustic music.

== History ==
In 2006, Compass purchased the Green Linnet and Xenophile catalogs, and in 2008 the label acquired the catalogue of Mulligan Records, specialising in Irish folk music. Red House Records, an independent folk and Americana record label founded in 1983 in St. Paul, Minnesota, was purchased by the Compass Records Group in 2017.

== Roster ==
- Altan
- Darol Anger
- Russ Barenberg
- Bearfoot
- Beoga
- Michael Black
- Paul Brady
- Dale Ann Bradley
- Paul Brock
- Paul Carrack
- Liz Carroll
- Beth Nielsen Chapman
- The Chapmans
- Jeff Coffin
- Éamonn Coyne
- A. J. Croce
- Catie Curtis
- Fairport Convention
- Kris Drever
- Elizabeth and the Catapult
- Farmer Not So John
- Mike Farris
- Matt Flinner
- Rebecca Frazier
- Gibson Brothers
- Thea Gilmore
- Grada
- Roddy Hart
- Colin Hay
- The Infamous Stringdusters
- Andy Irvine
- Nuala Kennedy
- Lúnasa
- Claire Lynch
- Mairéad Ní Mhaonaigh
- David Mayfield
- Cathal McConnell
- John McCusker
- Shannon McNally
- Clara Moreno
- Mozaik
- Jeb Loy Nichols
- Old Blind Dogs
- Old Salt Union
- Pierce Pettis
- Todd Phillips
- Noam Pikelny
- Kate Rusby
- Leftover Salmon
- Enda Scahill
- Sharon Shannon
- Frank Solivan
- The Tannahill Weavers
- Athena Tergis
- Glenn Tilbrook
- Ciaran Tourish
- Molly Tuttle
- Vigilantes of Love
- The Waifs
- Alicia Witt
- Victor Wooten
- Andrea Zonn

== See also ==
- List of record labels
- Green Linnet Records
- Xenophile Records
