= Manus McGuire =

Irish fiddle player

Manus McGuire is an Irish fiddle player.

== Early life ==
He was born in Tullamore, and grew up in County Sligo. He now resides in Dungarvan, Waterford.

== Career ==
He is a founding member of Buttons & Bows, Moving Cloud, Brock McGuire Band, Full Tilt and East West Fiddles

Manus performs mainly these days as a solo artist.

== Discography ==
- The Humours of Lissadell (with Seamus McGuire, Folk Legacy, 1980)
- Carousel (with Seamus McGuire & Daithi Sproule, Gael Linn, 1984)
- Buttons & Bows (by Buttons & Bows, Green Linnet, 1984)
- The First Month of Summer (by Buttons & Bows, Green Linnet, 1987)
- Grace Notes (by Buttons & Bows, Gael Linn, 1991)
- Moving Cloud (by Moving Cloud, Green Linnet, 1995)
- Foxglove (by Moving Cloud, Green Linnet, 1998)
- Saffron & Blue (Green Linnet, 2000)
- Brock McGuire Band (Ferndale, 2004)
- Fiddlewings (2006)
- Green Grass Blue Grass (with Ricky Skaggs et al, 2011)
- The Return of Spring (by Buttons & Bows, own label, 2015)
- Copperplate Sessions (2018)
- Full Tilt Live (2020)
- East West Fiddles (2023)
