= Handful of Earth =

Studio album by Dick Gaughan
- Released: March 1981
- Recorded: Late 1980
- Studios: Temple Studios, near Edinburgh
- Genre: Scottish folk
- Length: 43:21
- Label: Topic
- Producer: Dick Gaughan

Dick Gaughan chronology
Gaughan (1978)	Handful of Earth (1981)	Parallel Lines (1982)

Handful of Earth is the fifth solo studio album by Scottish folk musician and singer Dick Gaughan, released in 1981 by Topic Records. The album was Gaughan's first after spending several years largely avoiding playing music while regaining his health following a mental breakdown in 1979. Containing an array of traditional and contemporary folk songs performed on guitar with open tunings, Handful of Earth was by far Gaughan's most political album to that point, and was inspired by the political turmoil in Scotland following the Conservative Party victory at the 1979 general election.

Gaughan recorded the album with engineer Robin Morton at the latter's Temple Studios. During recording, Morton extended the album's recording sessions to allow them to complete what they both felt was becoming Gaughan's best work. When the album was completed, Gaughan felt he had released the best album he possibly could, causing him to change direction following its release rather than use the template he had on Handful of Earth. The album was critically acclaimed, and was named "Folk Album of the Year" by Melody Maker and, later, Folk Roots readers and critics both named it the greatest album of the 1980s, while also ranking 907th in the 1998 edition of All Time Top 1000 Albums. The album has proven influential on artists such as Billy Bragg. In 2007, Gaughan played Handful of Earth live for the first time at Glasgow City Halls.

== Background and recording ==
Scottish folk singer/guitarist Dick Gaughan released his acclaimed debut album No More Forever in 1972, and throughout the 1970s, he developed a career primarily steeped within Celtic folk music. Within the blossoming Scottish folk scene, Gaughan soon became a veteran. After Gaughan left the band Five Hand Reel towards the end of 1978, he started having on-off bouts of depression and mental illness which came to a nadir in 1979 when he had a total breakdown. Gaughan felt the 'inevitable' result of his touring life, such as unhealthy living and heavy alcohol consumption, had caught up with him, and as such he spent the following two years doing very little but focusing on becoming healthier again, aside from the occasional short European tour and contributing to the collaborative folk compilation Folk Friends 2 (1980), which contains seven solo or collaborative Gaughan songs.

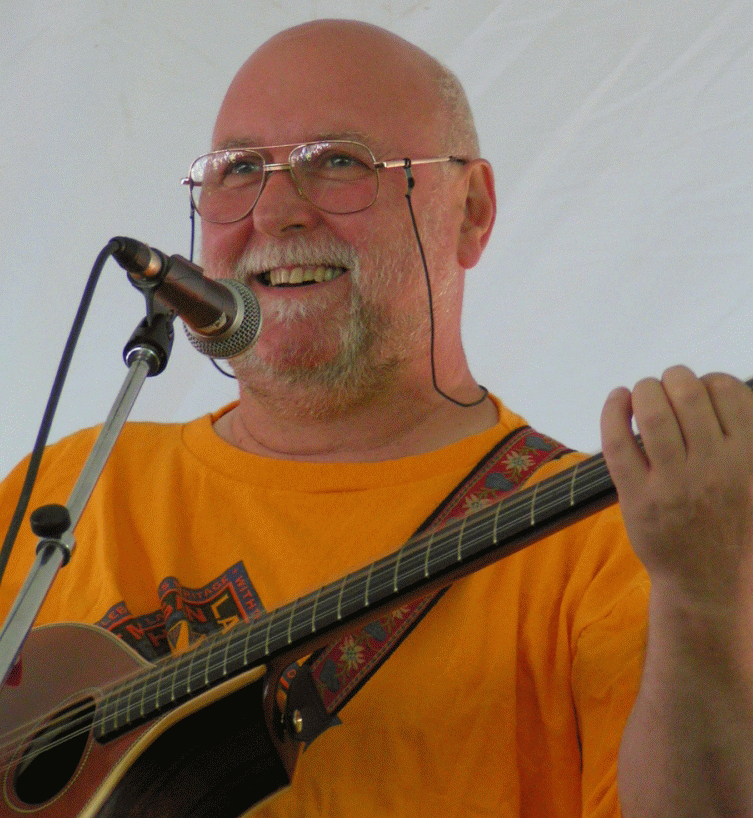
Brian McNeill (pictured 2006), who plays fiddle on two songs.

Prior to his breakdown, the 1979 general election was won by Margaret Thatcher's Conservative Party with a majority in England but a minority in Wales and Scotland. This followed the Scottish devolution referendum by two months and, according to Gaughan, "people in Scotland, particularly on the Left, were reeling under the economic consequences of the Thatcher strategy for solving inflation by crashing the economy and creating mass unemployment. What seemed to be required was to openly stand up and be counted." While all of Gaughan's solo albums in the 1970s included songs which reflected his political views, they had been "more as chronicler than as protagonist," and after improving his health, Gaughan decided his next album should better reflect his socialist views and the political turmoil in Scotland: "It was quite clearly time to stop reporting and start participating."

Handful of Earth became one in a series of solo albums by Gaughan which re-interpret Scottish and Irish traditional music for guitar. In the album's liner notes, he credits a conspicuous influence from many Northern Irish folk singers. The album was recorded in late 1980 at Temple Studios near Edinburgh and was produced by Dick Gaughan with Robin Morton, the latter of whom also engineered the recording. Guest musicians appear on several songs, namely Phil Cunningham, who contributes whistle to one track and keyboard to another, Brian McNeill, who adds fiddle to two tracks, and Stewart Isbister, who adds bass to one track. During the album's recording, both Gaughan and Morton realised the album was developing into a "special" one; Morton recalled: "It was one of those situations where money really wasn't enough, and as time went on it became obvious that Dick needed more time, so I gave him more time just so we could turn out a great album."

== Composition ==
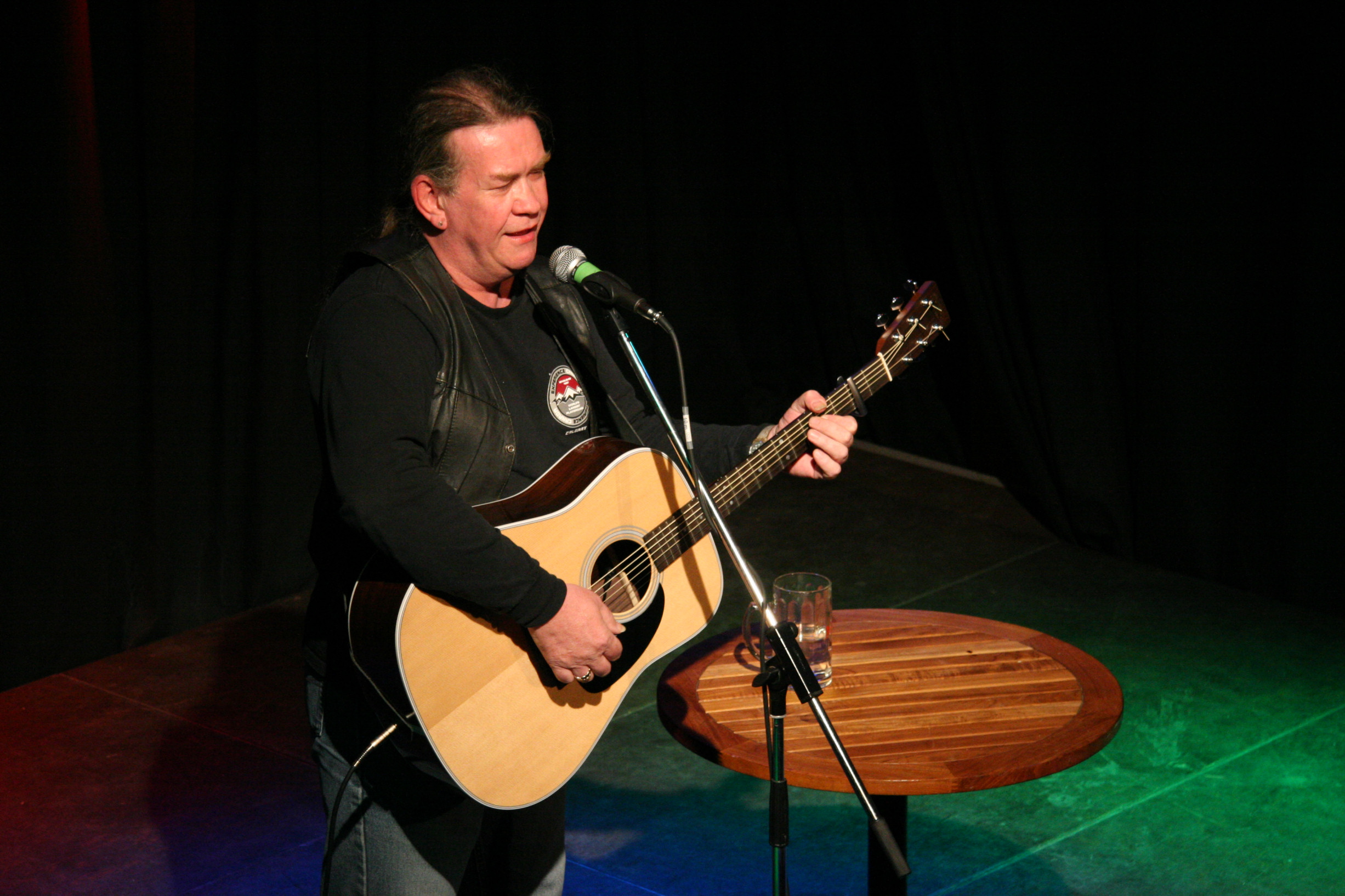
Dick Gaughan (pictured 2006) moved into a stronger political direction on Handful of Earth.

Handful of Earth blends traditional and contemporary folk songs. Most of the traditional tracks are Scottish folk songs, including old Highland ballads, while the contemporary folk songs are either covers or originals by Gaughan. The album is fiercely political, featuring songs that deal with struggle, workers' rights and the political deception of the elite. Many of the songs concern specific political issues within Scotland, and the album was said by The Herald to resonate within Gaughan's "political sensibilities, his abhorrence of bigotry, injustice and inequality," a point reinforced by musician Alasdair Roberts who said: "Every song has some sort of point to it, some kind of reason for existing." "Erin-Go-Bragh" and "Both Sides of the Tweed", both well-known ballads, are transformed by Gaughan into passionate Scottish anthems.

Gaughan's guitar playing on the album is particularly intricate. Writer Stewart Lee, when speaking about the album, said Gaughan is "one of those people who's so good at folk guitar that it almost becomes avant-garde. He's within a hair's breadth of someone like Thurston Moore or Jim O'Rourke suddenly declaring him the answer." He felt that the guitar playing, which he compared to John Fahey, presents an unusual contrast to the sentimental songs. The songs on the album boast open tunings, most often DADGAD, also known as the Celtic tuning, which Gaughan most often capped to the 5th fret, although sometimes to the 2nd, while other tunings on the album include CGCGCD, DADDAE and DGDDAE.

"Erin-Go-Bragh" is a traditional song in a folk rock-style arrangement reminiscent of Five Hand Reel. It deals with the late 19th and early 20th century anti-Irish and anti-Highlander racism in Lowland Scotland. "Now Westlin' Winds" is another traditional track, which Gaughan learned from ex-miner Georgie Hamilton, and contrasts the picturesque, pastoral imagery of nature with the "slaughtering guns" of man. Gaughan learned the traditional "Craigie Hill" after hearing it on Paddy Tunney's album The Irish Edge (1966). "The World Turned Upside Down" was written by Leon Rosselson and would go on to be covered by Billy Bragg. The song concerns the Diggers' revolt, and is the first of two songs on the album, the other being "Worker's Song", to concern workers' rights and restore politics to the "front line" of folk music.

The traditional song "The Snows They Melt the Soonest", which concerns rejection from a woman, is performed in an intimate style. Gaughan writes that the song highlights that "there is much more to the lives of ordinary working people than the struggle to survive." The first part of "Lough Erne/First Kiss at Parting" is a traditional track that Gaughan learned from Cathal McConnell and is typical of Irish emigrant songs with its cheerful optimism for better life in a new land, while the second part was written by Gaughan and inspired by a poem, also named First Kiss at Parting. Meanwhile, the first part of "Scojun Waltz/Randers Hopsa" was written by Gaughan one morning in Andy Irvine's kitchen while the two worked on Parallel Lines, and was considered by Gaughan to "prove that Cajun music originated in Leith," given that he felt the track possessed both a Cajun and Scottish sound, while the second part is a traditional track in the Danish dance style 'hopsa'. It contains a DADGAD-tuned melody guitar and a DGDDAE-tuned harmony guitar.

"Song for Ireland" was written by the Englishman Phil Colclough, a friend of Gaughan's, and has since become a standard with Irish bar bands. "Workers' Song" was written by Ed Pickford with a self-explanatory message, while Gaughan's reworking of the traditional song "Both Sides of the Tweed", which was written to attack the Acts of Union 1707, sees Gaughan assume the character of someone who acknowledges the human spirit will overcome difficulty and struggle. The reconciliatory track was said by one writer to have scotched notions of Gaughan's nationalism.

== Release and reception ==
Professional ratings
Review scores
Source	Rating
AllMusic	5/5 stars
The Encyclopedia of Popular Music	5/5 stars
The Great Rock Discography	9/10
MusicHound Folk	5/5 stars

Handful of Earth was released in March 1981 by Topic Records. It failed to chart in either the UK or US, but was released to critical acclaim. Clive Pownceby of The Living Tradition wrote that the release of the album was "a shaft of light through some pretty turgid folk times and [marked] Gaughan's first full emergence as a premier league player." In a contemporary review, English Dance & Song magazine wrote that what distinguishes Gaughan as a performer is his "consistent choice of good, not to mention committed, material." Callahan's Irish Quarterly felt the album was likely the most fully realised expression of Gaughan's artistry. Fret magazine wrote: "The instrumentals and songs in this collection fully live up to Gaughan's handsome reputation, and they grow richer with every listening." Melody Maker named it their "Folk Album of the Year" 1981. Handful of Earth eventually fell out of print, leading Green Linnet Records to re-release it on CD in 1991.

Among retrospective reviews, Chip Renner of AllMusic named Handful of Earth an "Album Pick", writing that the album "is Gaughan's best blend of traditional and contemporary songs," and called "Song for Ireland" a "classic." In The Encyclopedia of Popular Music, writer Colin Larkin wrote that the album established Gaughan as one of contemporary folk's major artists, and wrote that "[t]his exceptional set is rightly regarded as a landmark in British traditional music." He also awarded the album a perfect score, as did MusicHound. In the book World Music: Africa, Europe and the Middle East, Handful of Earth is described as "perhaps the single best solo folk album of the decade, a record of stunning intensity with enough contemporary relevance and historical belief to grip all generations of music fans. Newsnet Scotland called the album a "masterpiece."

Writer Martin C. Strong was favourable towards Handful on Earth in The Great Rock Discography, noting that it explicitly espoused Gaughan's staunch socialist political views. Andy Irwin of Mojo wrote that Handful of Earth saw Gaughan take "the traditional song form to fresh heights of intensity and stirring power," and wrote that it "remains his masterwork, turning well-known ballads like 'Erin-Go-Bragh' and 'Both Sides of the Tweed' into passionate Scottish anthems and restoring politics to the front line of British folk music with 'Workers Song' and Leon Rosselson's emotive story of the diggers' revolt 'The World Turned Upside Down'." The positive critical reception reflects what Billboard noted as the album's passionate reputation among Celtic music fans around the world.

== Legacy ==
Handful of Earth became a milestone within traditional music, and established Dick Gaughan as a major force within contemporary folk and as one of the most committed folk singers within Britain, cementing his reputation for Scottish pride and outspoken topicality. Folk singer Billy Bragg, who ranks Handful of Earth as one of his favourite albums ever, said he was blown away when first listening to the album, writing that "Gaughan's commitment to the songs is wonderful. In many ways it goes beyond folk music but everything you ever believed folk music could and should be is there." He felt the release of the "incredible record" was timely just before the UK miners' strike. Comedian and writer Stewart Lee named Handful of Earth as one of his 13 favourite albums ever, calling it a "great album of Scottish nationalist songs and really old Highland ballads, with this fantastic intricate guitar playing. Just the atmosphere and the mood of it is really great." Alasdair Roberts also considers the album to be one of his favourites, while June Tabor said that "Dick gets inside a song like no one else and proved himself a great singer." Gaughan considered Handful of Earth to be his best ever work, and felt he had to change direction following its release because he felt the album's template could not be improved upon, saying:

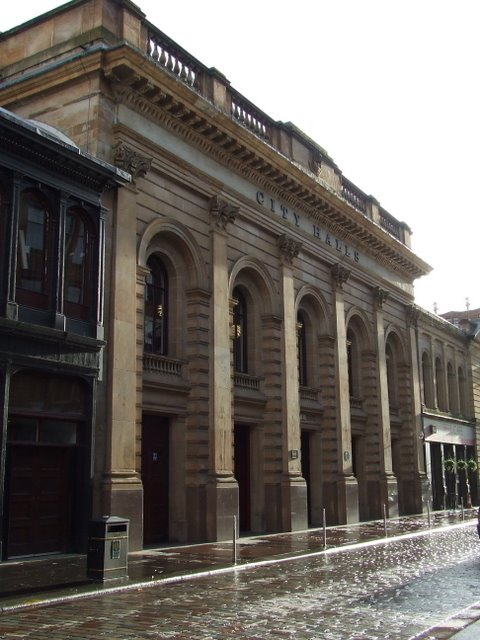
Glasgow City Halls, where Gaughan played Handful of Earth live in 2007.

"After I made it I felt, well that's it, I'm not going to do anything better. It was the best I could do, the best blend of songs I could find. I was fresh again after coming out of the whole Five Hand Reel band period, I'd done a record with Andy Irvine, I had a whole load of ideas to juggle about and the years and years of frustration all went into Handful of Earth. After that I had to do something different, there was absolutely no point in trying to remake Handful of Earth."

For two and a half decades following the album's release, Gaughan rarely revisited its songs and never played the album in concert, which he said was because "just about every song demands a precise retuning of his guitar." Nonetheless, in January 2007, Gaughan played the album live for the first time at City Halls, Glasgow, as part of the Celtic Connections festival, and was joined by fiddler Brian McNeill from the original album. During the performance, Gaughan declared "Now Westlin Winds" to be his favourite song ever. The Herald praised the performance, praising his "idiosyncratic, intense style" and noting the absence of "glib ditties or half-hearted performances."

In 1989, Handful of Earth was voted as "album of the decade" by Folk Roots in both its critics' and readers' polls. In 1998, the album ranked at number 907 in the updated version of the book All Time Top 1000 Albums, a list of the greatest albums of all time that was the result of over 200,000 votes cast by informed music lovers and ranked in order. In the earlier 1994 edition of the book, which presented lists of the greatest albums by genre, the album was named the 34th best folk album ever. In 2007, the album was one of 55 albums chosen by readers as an addition to The Guardian's list of the 1,000 greatest albums ever. The album is featured in the 2007 book The Mojo Collection, listing what its authors deem to be the 1,000 best albums ever. In the book Hang the DJ, John Williams ranks the album at number 2 in his list of "Ten Classics from the British and Irish Folk Revival."

== Track listing ==
All tracks Traditional; arranged by Dick Gaughan; except where indicated

=== Side one ===
1. "Erin-Go-Bragh" – 4:24
2. "Now Westlin Winds" – 4:29
3. "Craigie Hill – 6:09
4. "World Turned Upside Down" (Leon Rosselson) – 2:45
5. "The Snows They Melt the Soonest" – 4:11

=== Side two ===
6. "Lough Erne / First Kiss at Parting" – 5:45
7. "Scojun Waltz / Randers Hopsa" – 4:05
8. "Song for Ireland" (Phil Colclough) – 4:59
9. "Workers' Song" (Ed Pickford) – 2:59
10. "Both Sides the Tweed" – 3:35

== Personnel ==
- Dick Gaughan – vocals, guitar, production
- Phil Cunningham – whistle (track 1), keyboard (track 10)
- Brian McNeill – fiddle (tracks 1 and 7)
- Stewart Isbister – bass (track 10)

Technical

- Robin Morton – recording engineer
- Mick Campbell - front cover photograph
