= The Snows They Melt the Soonest =

Song
- Published: 1821
- Genre: English folk song
- Songwriter: Unknown

"The Snows They Melt the Soonest" (Roud 3154) is an English folk song dating back at least as far as 1821. It was mentioned, along with the lyrics, in Blackwood's Magazine (Edinburgh) of that year.

== History ==
The melody was printed in Bruce and Stokoe's Northumbrian Minstrelsy in 1882, which also mentioned its publication in 1821 and noted that the contributor of the song was Thomas Doubleday (1790–1870), who put it to a melody ("My Love is Newly Listed") learned from a Newcastle street singer. Thomas Doubleday was a radical agitator who often contributed to Blackwood's.

The singer Anne Briggs first popularized the song in the 1960s and recorded it in 1971. It was later learned by Archie Fisher who passed it on to Dick Gaughan. Gaughan recorded it on his Handful of Earth album, the success of which further popularized the song.

The song was used in the 2008 BBC adaptation of Thomas Hardy's Tess of the d'Urbervilles.

== Lyrics ==
The original lyrics as printed in Blackwood's Magazine, 1821, are:

O, the snow it melts the soonest when the winds begin to sing;
And the corn it ripens fastest when the frosts are setting in;
And when a woman tells me that my face she'll soon forget,
Before we part, I wad a crown, she's fain to follow't yet.

The snow it melts the soonest when the wind begins to sing;
And the swallow skims without a thought as long as it is spring;
But when spring goes, and winter blows, my lass, an ye'll be fain,
For all your pride, to follow me, were't cross the stormy main.

O, the snow it melts the soonest when the wind begins to sing;
The bee that flew when summer shined, in winter cannot sting;
I've seen a woman's anger melt between the night and morn,
And it's surely not a harder thing to tame a woman's scorn.

O, never say me farewell here -no farewell I'll receive,
For you shall set me to the stile, and kiss and take your leave;
But I'll stay here till the woodcock comes, and the martlet takes his wing,
Since the snow aye melts the soonest, lass, when the wind begins to sing.

== Recordings ==
- Archie Fisher, Archie Fisher (1968)
- Anne Briggs, Anne Briggs (1971)
- Pentangle, Solomon's Seal (1972)
- Horslips, Drive the Cold Winter Away (1975)
- The Furey Family, without title (recorded 1975, released 1977)
- Dick Gaughan, Handful of Earth, (Topic 12TS419) (1981)
- John Renbourn & Robin Williamson, Wheel of Fortune (1993)
- Old Blind Dogs, Legacy (1995)
- Maighread Ní Dhomhnaill & Tríona Ní Dhomhnaill, Celtic Christmas Volume III: A Windham Hill Sampler (1997)
- Eliza Carthy, Red Rice (1998)
- Karan Casey, The Winds Begin to Sing (2001)
- James Yorkston and the Athletes, Just Beyond the River (2004)
- Stonecircle, Winter Sky (2005)
- Cara Dillon, After the Morning (2006)
- Fit & Limo, Astralis (2007)
- Sting, If on a Winter's Night... (2009)
- The Longest Johns, Christmas At Sea (2013)
- Peter Knight's Gigspanner Big Band, Natural Invention (2019)
- Lewis Barfoot, Home (2023)
- Ninebarrow, The Colour of Night (2023)
- Broom Bezzums, Winterman (2012)
- Julianne Regan and Tim Bricheno of All About Eve, Winter 2023 (2023)
- Pressgang, Burning Boats (1994)

Being a well-documented song publicised by English Folk Dance and Song Society, and Mainly Norfolk, the song was recorded by Jon Boden and Oli Steadman for inclusion in their respective lists of daily folk songs "A Folk Song a Day" and "365 Days Of Folk".
