= Sandy Bell's =

Bar in Edinburgh, Scotland

Coordinates: 55.9461°N 3.1913°W

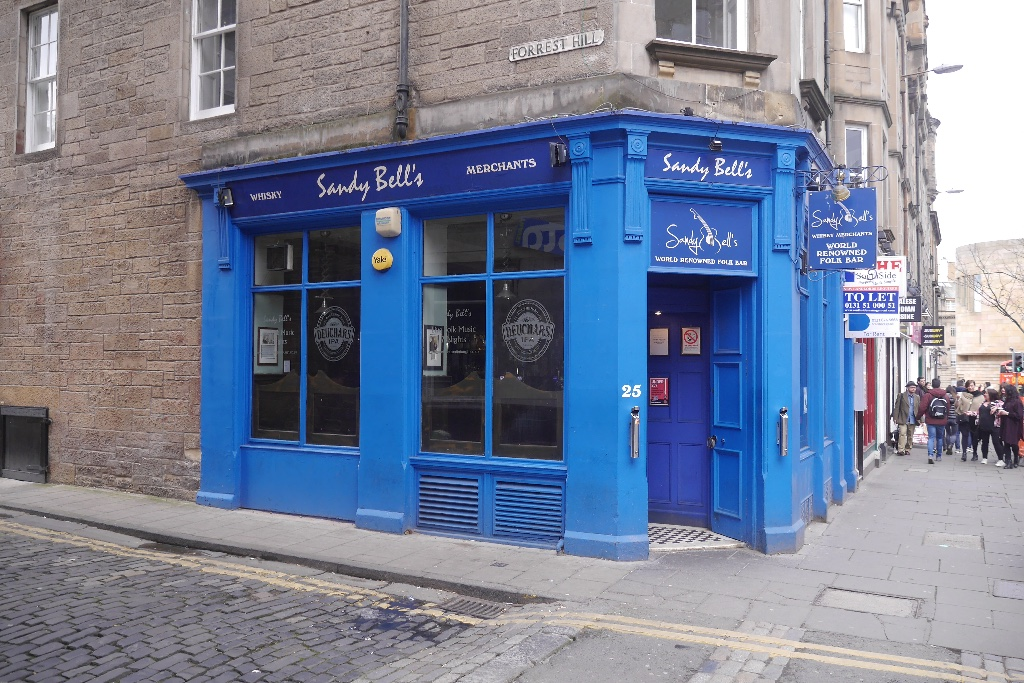
Sandy Bell's

Sandy Bell's is a bar in Edinburgh, Scotland. It is located on Forrest Road, in the Old Town area of the city. It is known locally and internationally for its live traditional music sessions.

Sandy Bell's original name was 'The Forrest Hill Buffet', later becoming 'The Forrest Hill Bar'. The bar's current name derives from the building’s 1920s owner Mrs Bell; the origin of the name 'Sandy' is, however, uncertain.

== Scottish Folk Revival ==
Sandy Bell's gained notoriety during the Scottish Folk Revival of the 1950s-1970s, when musicians playing traditional Scottish music would regularly take part in music sessions there. According to ethnologist Ailie Munro, several people with early involvement in the revival claim it to have originated in Sandy Bell's in the late 1940s. Musicians who frequented the bar during the revival included Phil Cunningham, Barbara Dickson and Billy Connolly.

A fortnightly magazine called 'The Sandy Bell's Broadsheet' was published during this period by pub regulars including Ian Green, founder of Greentrax Records. Editorial meetings took place in the pub, which also served as its correspondence address.

During the revival, and until his death in 2002, Sandy Bell's was regularly visited by the folklorist Hamish Henderson. Sandy Bell's is located close to the University of Edinburgh, where Henderson worked at the School of Scottish Studies. A bust of Henderson is displayed above the bar in Sandy Bell's.

During the 1970s an album entitled Sandy Bell’s Ceilidh was recorded on the premises, including performances by Aly Bain, Dick Gaughan and The McCalmans. The McCalmans and Aly Bain lived nearby during this period, and musicians who wanted to keep playing after Sandy Bell's closed would sometimes congregate in their flat to do so.
