= Eddie Duffy =

Irish musician (1894–1986)

Eddie Duffy (1894–1986) was a traditional Irish musician. Many of his songs and tunes came from his mother, who played the accordion.

== Music ==
He was influenced by the playing of William Carroll and Laurence Nugent, from Lack, County Fermanagh. His name is now internationally known since he passed on many tunes and songs to Cathal McConnell of the group The Boys of the Lough.

== Eddie Duffy and Mick Hoy Memorial Traditional Music Festival ==
In memory of Eddie Duffy, the Eddie Duffy and Mick Hoy Memorial Traditional Music Festival takes place every year on the second weekend in October in Derrygonnelly.

== See also ==
- Irish flute
- Mick Hoy (musician)
