= Ceilidh Culture =

Ceilidh Culture is an annual festival held in Edinburgh, Scotland which incorporates folk music, song, dance and storytelling. There is currently a month-long programme of events which take place around Easter time. The current format first took place in 2003, although Edinburgh has had a festival with traditional ceilidh music also involving all the traditional arts since 1951.

== History ==
Hamish Henderson was instrumental in creating the first People's Festival in 1951, with funding from the British Council, The Communist Party and the Scottish TUC, this was revived in 2002 by the Scottish Socialist Party MSP Colin Fox. This saw a performance of Ewan MacColl's play "Uranium 235" and Gaelic singing by Flora MacNeil and others. In 1952 it ran for three weeks. Almost all the major funders withdrew in 1952. In a reduced programme the Ceilidh became the chief event. In 1953 it was the further reduced, but both Jeannie Robertson and Jean Ritchie made memorable appearances. The 1954 People's Festival was the last.

In 1964 there was an Edinburgh Folk Festival, with appearances by The Corries, The Dubliners, the Ian Campbell Folk Group and Robin Hall and Jimmie Macgregor. Evidence is fragmentary, but there were probably other years in which it took place. From 1979 to 1999 there was an annual Edinburgh Folk Festival with all the major Celtic music bands represented - Planxty, The Boys of the Lough, the Battlefield Band, and so on. Financial problems caused its collapse in 1999, but in 2003 saw the launch of a new event, called Ceilidh Culture.
