= The Boys of the Lough (album) =

Studio album by The Boys of the Lough
- Released: 1973
- Recorded: July 1972
- Studio: Cecil Sharp House, London, England.
- Genre: Folk
- Label: Trailer
- Producer: Bill Leader

The Boys of the Lough chronology
The Boys of the Lough (1973)	Second Album (1973)

The Boys of the Lough is a folk album by The Boys of the Lough, originally released in 1973 by Trailer, catalogue number LER 2086.

The album was produced by Bill Leader. The painting of the group reproduced on the original LP cover was by Sandy Cheyne.

This is the first Boys of the Lough album. The original LP sleeve notes record that initial sessions had already taken place by March 1972 including guitarist Mike Whellans, at that time regularly working in a duo with Aly Bain as well as part of the Boys. Whellans left to be replaced by Dick Gaughan and the album was re-recorded from scratch in a short time; original partial contributor Lindsay Porteous (jaw harp, mouthbow) was not included in the new sessions.

== Track listing ==
All titles Traditional; arranged by Bain, Gaughan, McConnell and Morton except "Wedding March..." Traditional; arranged by Anderson

1. "The Boys of the Lough/Slanty Gart"
2. "In Praise of John Magee"
3. "Wedding March From Uist/The Bride's a Bonny Thing/Sleep Soond i' da Moarnin'"
4. "Farewell to Whisky"
5. "Old Joe's Jig/Last Night's Joy/The Granny in the Corner"
6. "The Old Oak Tree"
7. "Caoineadh Eoghain Rua/The Nine Points of Roguery"
8. "Docherty's Reel/Flowing Tide"
9. "Andrew Lammie"
10. "Sheebeg and Sheemore/The Boy in the Gap/McMahon's Reel"
11. "Jackson and Jane"
12. "The Shaalds of Foulla/Garsters Dream/The Brig"

== Personnel ==
- Cathal McConnell – flute, vocal
- Robin Morton – bodhran, vocal
- Aly Bain – fiddle
- Dick Gaughan – guitar, mandolin, vocal
