= Mick Hoy =

Mick Hoy may refer to:

- Mick Hoy (footballer), Irish footballer
- Mick Hoy (musician) (1913–2000), Irish musician
