= Dick Gaughan =

Scottish musician (born 1948)

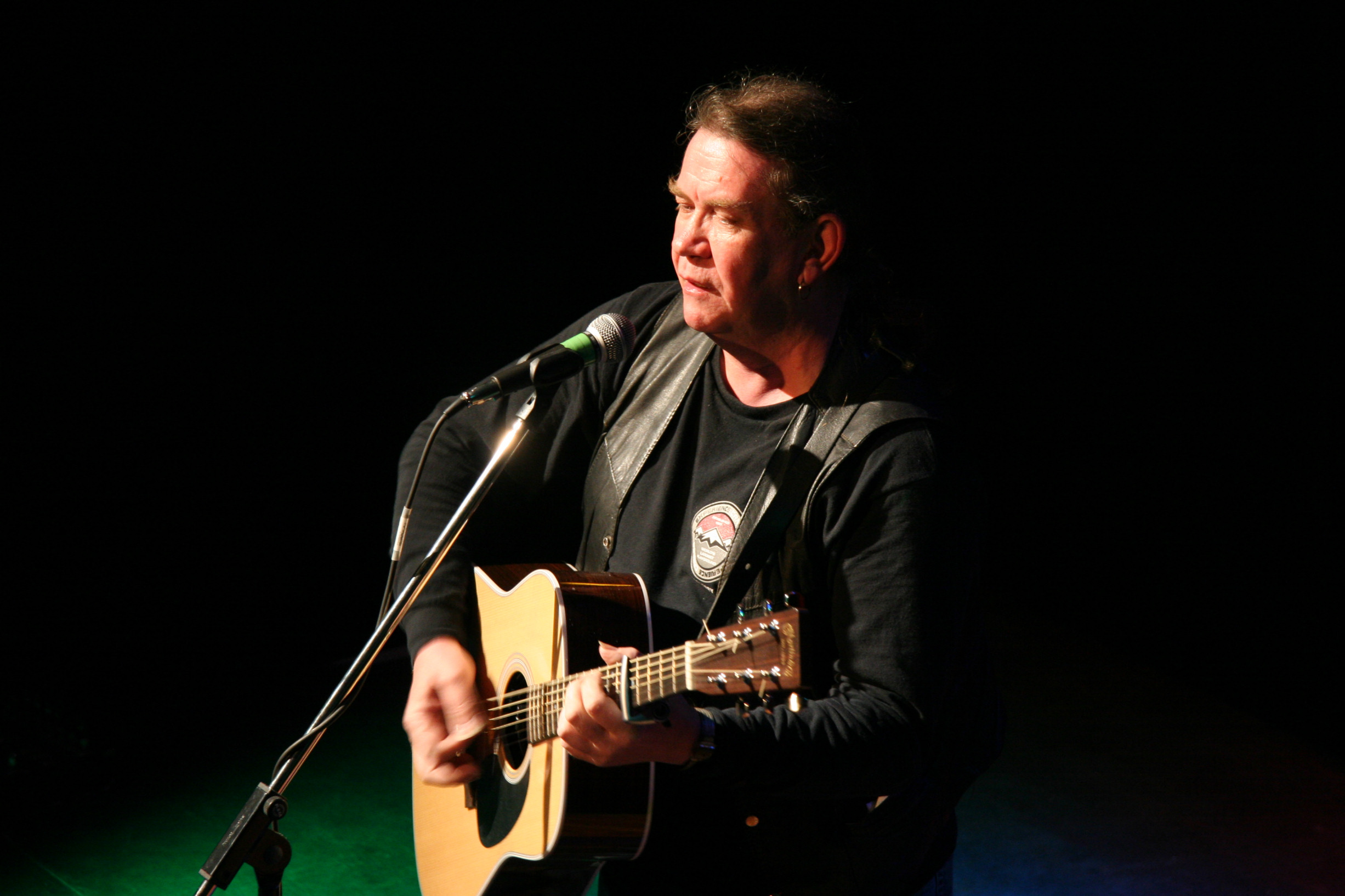
- Gaughan at the "Rätsche" in Geislingen an der Steige, Germany, May 2006

Background information
- Born: Richard Peter Gaughan; 17 May 1948 (age 78); Glasgow, Scotland
- Origin: Leith, Edinburgh, Scotland
- Genres: Scottish folk; contemporary folk; protest song; folk rock
- Occupations: Singer-songwriter; composer; orchestrator
- Instruments: Vocals; guitar
- Formerly of: The Boys of the Lough; Five Hand Reel; Clan Alba

Richard Peter Gaughan (born 17 May 1948) is a Scottish singer-songwriter known for his social protest songs and contributions to Scotland's folk music tradition. He is regarded as one of the country's leading singer-songwriters.

== Early years ==
Gaughan was born in Glasgow's Royal Maternity Hospital while his father was working in Glasgow as an engine driver. He spent the first year-and-a-half of his life in Rutherglen, South Lanarkshire, after which the whole family moved to Leith, a port on the outskirts of Edinburgh.

The eldest of three children, Gaughan grew up surrounded by the music of both Scotland and Ireland. His mother, a Highland Scot from Lochaber who spoke Gaelic, had as a child won a silver medal for singing at a Gaelic Mòd. His father, a native of Leith, played guitar. His Irish-born paternal grandfather (a native of Erris, County Mayo) played the fiddle and his paternal grandmother, a Glaswegian born to Irish parents, played button accordion and sang. The family experienced considerable poverty, but the area they lived in possessed a strong community spirit and many of Gaughan's songs celebrate his working-class roots. In his teens Gaughan served an apprenticeship at a local paper mill, but had wanted to be a musician since he first started playing guitar at the age of seven. He got involved with the local folk music scene and, with two others, started a club called the Edinburgh Folk Centre. He turned professional in early 1970 and moved to London.

== 1970s ==
Gaughan's first album, No More Forever, was recorded in 1971. On it he sings and plays acoustic guitar, joined on some tracks by fiddler Aly Bain. All the songs except one are traditional, the exception being Hamish Henderson's "The John Maclean March", a tribute to the Glasgow socialist John Maclean and a foretaste of the many politically committed songs that Gaughan would later record. In 1972, before his album was released, Gaughan joined Bain, Cathal McConnell and Robin Morton, all of whom he had known from his Edinburgh Folk Centre days, in their group The Boys of the Lough. He stayed with the group for about a year, during which he played and sang on their eponymous debut album. He gave his reason for leaving the group as fear of flying, which was incompatible with the group's travelling commitments.

Gaughan resumed his solo career and on his next album, Kist O Gold (recorded in 1975), he sang mainly traditional songs, using only his guitar as accompaniment. In that year he also recorded two tracks with The High Level Ranters on their album The Bonnie Pit Laddie. He was, however, becoming frustrated with the folk club scene and keen to work with other musicians, so he joined the Celtic rock band Five Hand Reel. Between 1976 and 1978 the pace of Gaughan's life was hectic. He recorded four albums with Five Hand Reel (three under their own name and one in collaboration with the Danish folksinger Alan Klitgaard), as well as two solo ones: the all-instrumental Coppers and Brass (1975), and Gaughan (1978), on which he played both acoustic and electric guitars. He also collaborated with Tony Capstick and Dave Burland in an album of songs by Ewan MacColl.

Gaughan loved playing with Five Hand Reel and is proud of its music, but as time went on he felt that the band was being pressurised into becoming more commercial. Five Hand Reel was more popular in northern Europe than in the UK, so he had to spend a lot of time on the road away from his family, and an excessive consumption of alcohol and generally unhealthy lifestyle began to take their toll, both physically and mentally. In November 1978 Gaughan's daughter was knocked down by a car and seriously injured while he was away. This event precipitated a major crisis in Gaughan's life. He left the band but found it difficult to get solo gigs and by the end of the decade he was only playing occasionally, supplementing his income by writing articles for the magazine Folk Review.

== 1980s ==
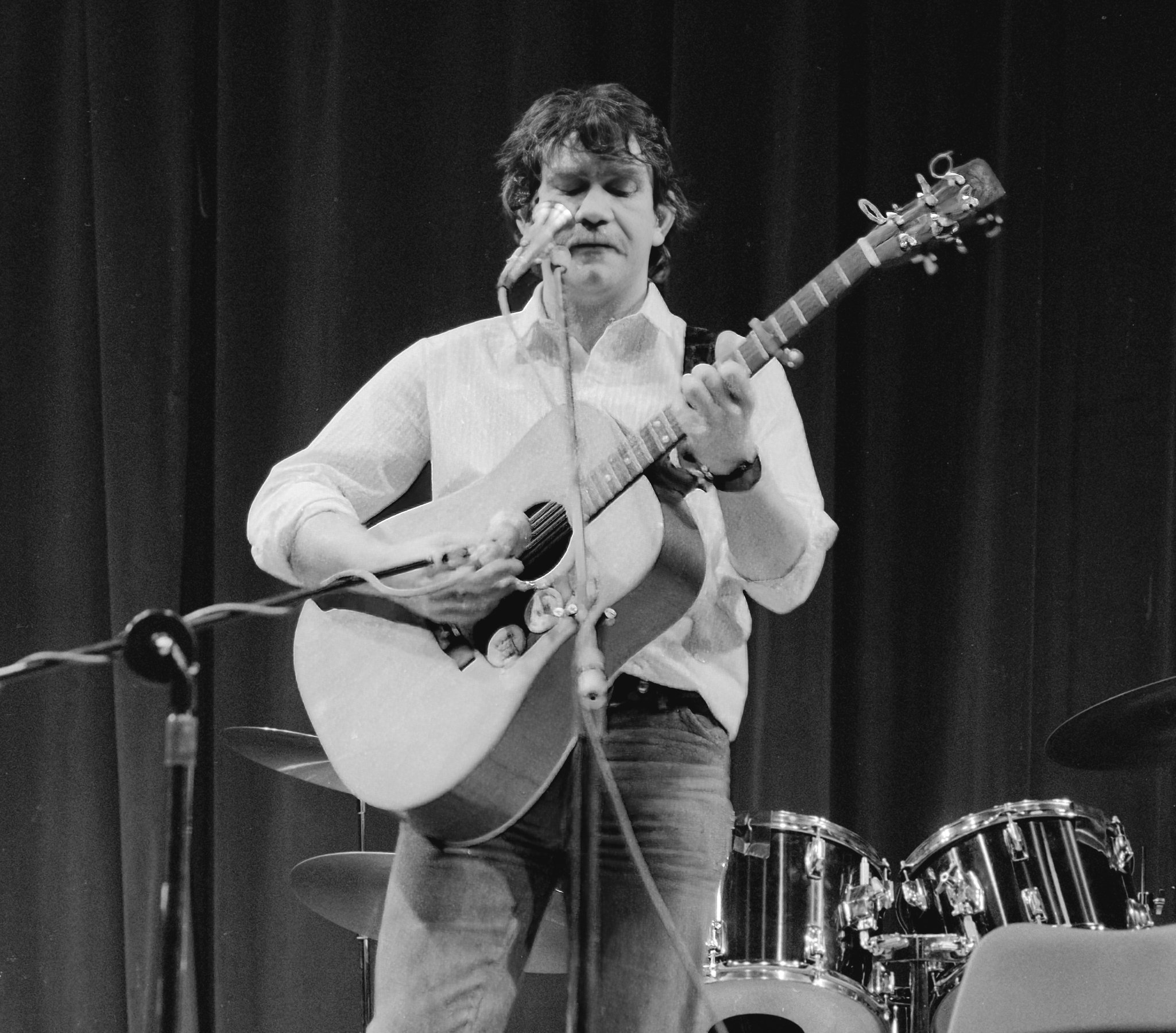
Dick Gaughan, 1985

Gaughan resumed playing in 1980, collaborating with several other performers on the album Folk Friends 2 and with Andy Irvine on Parallel Lines (1982).

His next solo album, Handful of Earth (1981) became, he said, his most successful in terms of acclaim and sales. It was Melody Maker's folk album of the year in 1981, and in 1989 was voted album of the decade by Folk Roots magazine (now fRoots) in both readers' and critics' polls. The album contained a strong set of traditional and contemporary songs, including several which have remained part of Gaughan's core repertoire, such as Robert Burns's lyrical "Now Westlin Winds", the feisty "Erin Go Bragh", Phil & June Colclough's evocative "Song For Ireland" and his own reworking of the traditional "Both Sides The Tweed", which calls for Scottish independence without sacrificing friendship with the rest of the UK.

The Thatcher government of the 1980s galvanised Gaughan politically. He had never hidden his strong socialist beliefs and all his albums had included songs by such writers as Hamish Henderson, Ewan MacColl, Dominic Behan, Ed Pickford and Leon Rosselson. Now, however, he felt that "It was quite clearly time to stop reporting and start participating" and his next album, A Different Kind of Love Song (1983) was, he said, "a full-frontal onslaught, basically an anti Cold War polemic". All of its songs, which were performed in a variety of styles ranging from acoustic folk to electric rock 'n' roll, exuded political commitment. Gaughan also extended his political activism to areas other than singing. He instigated the setting up of "Perform", an organisation which aimed to facilitate co-operation across the folk music world, he joined the agitprop theatre group 7:84 and during the UK miners' strike (1984–85) he was Chair of the Leith Miners' Support Group.

Gaughan recorded three solo albums over the next few years: Live in Edinburgh (1985) (his first solo gig following a 6-month lay-off due to losing his voice), True and Bold (1986), a collection of songs about mining and Call It Freedom (1988), which was similar in style and content to A Different Kind of Love Song. He also collaborated with the jazz percussionist Ken Hyder on an album of free improvisation, Fanfare for Tomorrow (1985), and sang and played with other artists on a tribute to Woody Guthrie, Woody Lives! (1987).

== 1990s ==
By the early 90s Gaughan was again feeling the need to work regularly with others, so he invited seven other well-established Scots musicians to form a group called Clan Alba. The original line-up consisted of Gaughan, singer-guitarist Davy Steele, harpists Mary Macmaster and Patsy Seddon, multi-instrumentalist Brian McNeill, piper Gary West and percussionists Mike Travis and Dave Tulloch. The group made its debut at the 1992 Edinburgh Folk Festival and performed at other festivals across the UK and Europe over the next two years, during which time Gary West left and was replaced by Fred Morrison. In 1994 Clan Alba recorded an eponymous double CD, which Gaughan produced at Redesdale Studios, but the group disbanded the following year after problems with the marketing of the record.

Resuming his solo career, Gaughan recorded two further albums during the decade. On Sail On (1996) he was accompanied by several Clan Alba alumni. Along with political anthems such as Pete Seeger's "Waist Deep In The Big Muddy" and Brian McNeill's "No Gods and Precious Few Heroes", the record also featured Gaughan's interpretations of more mainstream songs, including Jagger/Richards's "Ruby Tuesday" and Richard Thompson's "1952 Vincent Black Lightning. He described his next, Redwood Cathedral (1998), as "primarily a homage by a song interpreter to the craft of the songwriter." It featured stripped-down arrangements of reflective songs, including the old Everly Brothers hit, "Let It Be Me", Pete Seeger's "Turn, Turn, Turn" and Lal Waterson's "Fine Horseman".

During this period Gaughan also became actively involved in Usenet. He had studied computer programming during the 1980s, started building websites in 1994 and set up his own web design company in 1998.

== 2000 to present day ==
In the early 2000s Gaughan turned his hand to larger-scale composition and received two orchestral commissions from the Celtic Connections festival. The first, "Timewaves (Love Song to a People's Music)", mixed orchestral playing with folk singing and was performed at the 2004 festival by the Orchestra of Scottish Opera together with Gaughan and other folk singers and players. The second was a symphony, "Treaty 300", composed for the inaugural concert of the Celtic Connections Youth Orchestra in 2007. Between 2001 and 2008 five Gaughan albums were released. On Outlaws and Dreamers (2001), he used only his acoustic guitar and Brian McNeill's fiddle to accompany his voice. Prentice Piece (2002) was a self-selected thirty-year retrospective of his career (although some material could not be included owing to copyright disputes). The Definitive Collection (2006) was another compilation. Lucky For Some (2006) consisted almost entirely of self-written songs and Gaughan Live! at the Trades Club (2008) was a live gig, recorded at one of his favourite venues, the Trades Club, Hebden Bridge, Yorkshire.

Gaughan continued to regularly play solo gigs and for a while presented a weekly music programme, "Crossroads", for the Scottish radio station Black Diamond FM.

In September 2016, believing he had had a stroke some time previously which was affecting his ability to perform, Gaughan announced that he was cancelling all public performances until further notice. An MRI scan the next month confirmed the stroke, and in November of that year a benefit concert, featuring Aly Bain, Phil Cunningham, Billy Bragg, Karine Polwart and Eddi Reader, was held for him in Edinburgh. According to his booking agent, Gaughan entered a course of physiotherapy in February 2017 and was to remain in physio and not performing "for the foreseeable future".

In 2025, two newspaper articles provided some updates on Gaughan's situation: in March, Colin Harper asked and answered the rhetorical question "Whatever Happened to Dick Gaughan?" in Belfast's News Letter, telling his own story of reaching out to Gaughan to see how he's doing, getting him on board in the idea to reissue some of his older out of print recordings, subsequently getting together with Scottish musicians Barbara Dickson and Karine Polwart to plan the realisation of this project as a 7CD+DVD box set under the title R/evolution: 1969–83, and promoting a correspondent crowdfunding campaign to pay for it (and a few extra releases to come). In November, Jude Rogers followed up in the Guardian interviewing Harper, paying respects to Gaughan the artist and recounting struggles over rights to some of his works, retelling the then already successful origin story of Harper-and-friends-the-box-set-compilers, and giving latest up-to-date information on Harper et al.'s Dick Gaughan Legacy Project and its upcoming rereleases of classic Dick Gaughan recordings.

As of December 2025, the Dick Gaughan Legacy Project announces the release of R/evolution: 1969–83 "to the general public in January 2026" and advertises an "associated single-vinyl release", Live at the BBC: 1972–79, as available for pre-order – both via Last Night From Glasgow – on its website.

== Vocal and guitar styles ==
Gaughan sings in Scots (his first language), English and, occasionally, Gaelic. His voice has been described by some as "capable of turning from aching tenderness to the high dudgeon of political rage within the space of a line, or, on occasion, even in the turn of a single word".

He plays guitar in a variety of tunings, using both flatpicking and fingerpicking styles and has acknowledged Doc Watson and Hank Snow (flatpickers), Davey Graham, Bert Jansch and Martin Carthy (fingerpickers) as his prime influences. He has recorded extensively as a session musician and has been called "one of the finest and most original guitarists in the British Isles".

Gaughan's live performances are noted for their passion and intensity. According to The Rough Guide to World Music "[his] passionate artistry towers like a colossus above three decades"; while another reviewer has commented that "in live performance he generates the sort of voodoo intensity you expect from the rawest blues, but hardly from the cosily insular world of British folk".

== Accolades ==
Gaughan has been the subject of three television documentaries in the UK: BBC Two's Spectrum (1982), Scottish Television's NB (1989) and BBC Four's Sessions (2008) (featuring a live performance and documentary footage).

In December 2009 he was inducted into the Scottish Traditional Music Hall of Fame and in February 2010 he received a Lifetime Achievement Award at BBC Radio Two's annual Folk Awards ceremony.

Gaughan is regarded as one of Scotland's leading singer-songwriters.

== Discography ==
=== Solo albums ===
- No More Forever (Trailer, 1972)
- Kist o' Gold (Trailer, 1976)
- Coppers and Brass (Topic, 1977)
- Gaughan (Topic, 1978)
- Handful of Earth (Topic, 1981)
- A Different Kind of Love Song (Celtic Music, 1983)
- Live in Edinburgh (Celtic Music, 1985)
- True and Bold: Songs of the Scottish Miners (STUC, 1986)
- Call It Freedom (Celtic Music, 1988)
- Sail On (Greentrax, 1996)
- Redwood Cathedral (Greentrax, 1998)
- Outlaws and Dreamers (Greentrax, 2001)
- The Definitive Collection (High Point, 2006) (compilation)
- Lucky for Some (Greentrax, 2006)
- Gaughan Live! at the Trades Club (Greentrax, 2008)
- Dick Gaughan - The Harvard Tapes (Greentrax, 2019)
- Untroubled: Live In Belfast 1979-82 (Gaughan Recordings, 2025)
- Live In The 70s (Gaughan Recordings, 2025)

=== Compilations ===
- Prentice Piece (Greentrax, 2002)

=== The Boys of the Lough ===
- The Boys of the Lough (Trailer, 1973 and reissued on Shanachie)

=== Five Hand Reel ===
- Five Hand Reel (Rubber, 1976)
- For A' That (RCA, 1977)
- Ebbe, Dagmar, Svend og Alan (Sonet, 1978) (Alan Klitgaard with Five Hand Reel)
- Earl o' Moray (RCA, 1978)

=== Clan Alba ===
- Clan Alba (Clan Alba Productions, 1995)

=== Collaborations ===
- Songs of Ewan MacColl (Rubber, 1978) (with Dave Burland and Tony Capstick)
- Folk Friends 2 (Folk Freak, 1981) (with various artists)
- Parallel Lines (Folk Freak, 1982) (with Andy Irvine)
- Fanfare for Tomorrow (Impetus, 1985) (with Ken Hyder)
- Woody Lives!: a Tribute to Woody Guthrie (Black Crow, 1987) (with Bert Jansch, Rab Noakes, Rory McLeod, Rod Clements and Ray Jackson)

=== Tracks contributed ===
- Kertalg '74 (Barclay, 1974) (sings "Seven Yellow Gypsies", recorded live at the folk festival in Brittany (France) 1974).
- The High Level Ranters: The Bonnie Pit Laddie (Topic, 1975) (sings "Bonnie Woodhaa" and "The Auchengeich Disaster"). These two tracks are also available on the CD versions of Gaughan (Topic, 1991) and The Iron Muse: A Panorama of Industrial Folk Song (Topic, 1993)
- The Second Folk Review Record (Leader, 1976) (sings "Arthur McBride" and "The Rashie Moor")
- Sandy Bell's Ceilidh (Dara, 1977) (sings "The Cruel Brother" and "Sleepytoun")
- Songs for Peace (Rounder, 1983) (sings "Your Daughters and Your Sons")
- Out of the Darkness: Songs for Survival (Fire on the Mountain, 1984) (sings "As I Walked on the Road")
- 15. Festival des politischenes Liedes, 1985 (Silverspeed, 1985) (sings "Which side are you on", live in East Berlin, 1985.
- Tanz & Folkfest Rudolstadt '93 (Heideck, 1993) (sings "Both sides The Tweed" live at Rudolstadt (Germany) folk festival, 1993
- Scotland: Tunes From The Lowlands, Highlands & Islands (Network Medien, 1995) (sings "Bonnie Jeannie", recorded live at the WDR folk festival in Köln (Germany) 1983) and "Such a parcel of rogues in a nation" (recorded live at the WDR-Funkhaus, 1982)
- STUC Centenary Album: If It Wisnae For The Union (Greentrax, 1996) (sings "Both Sides the Tweed", recorded specially for the album.)
- The Irish Folk Festival: Spirit of Ireland (Folk Freak, 1997) (sings "The Wind That Shakes the Barley", "Song for Ireland" and "When I'm Gone")
- Street Cries (Topic, 2001) (sings "Young Henry Martin")
- Shining Bright: Songs of Lal and Mike Waterson (Topic, 2001) (sings "The Scarecrow")
- Seeds: Songs of Pete Seeger Vol. 3 (Appleseed, 2003) (sings "The Bells of Rhymney")
- The Clear Stream: Guitar Music From Scotland And Beyond (Greentrax, 2004) (plays "She of Many Names" and "Accrington McBrides / Wexford Assembly")
- McCalman Singular: Songs by Ian McCalman (Greentrax, 2004) (sings "War Outside")
- Tich Frier: Shanghaied (Celtic Music CMCD 089, 2007) (sings "Sailing to Philadelphia")
- Steele the Show: Songs of Davy Steele (Greentrax, 2011) (sings "The Ballad of Jimmy Steele" and "The Last Trip Home")
- Martin Simpson: Purpose and Grace (Topic, 2011) (sings Jamie Foyers and Brother Can You Spare a Dime)

Compilations including previously issued tracks have been omitted, as have albums where Gaughan's contribution was as a session musician.
