= Mick Hoy (musician) =

Michael John Hoy (1913 – 12 June 2000), singer, fiddler, composer, and storyteller, was born in Monea in County Fermanagh, Northern Ireland. In his youth he was hired at the Derrygonnelly Fair by a farmer who played the fiddle. It was from this farmer that he learned to play the instrument. He played in the 1930s and 1940s with local Céilí bands, the Sillees and the Knockmore Céilí Band. He lived most of his life in Blaney and played mainly in Derrygonnelly. Mick came from a musical family but stood out as the main talent with his huge repertoire of tunes and songs.

His singing style was subtle with beautiful use of glottal stops and variations in phrasing. One of the finest fiddlers of his generation, his powerful style was an interesting blend of Northern and Southern elements. He had a stock of distinctly local tunes, many of which he got from his old friend, the great flute-player Eddie Duffy. In turn he passed his music on to fellow-musicians such as Cathal McConnell (of The Boys of the Lough), Altan, Seamus Quinn, Ben Lennon, Jim McGrath and others.

In 1986 the Arts Council of Northern Ireland published Here is a Health, a cassette release of songs, fiddle tunes and stories recorded by Seán Corcoran in the Derrygonnelly area between 1979 and 1985. Mick Hoy on featured ten of the album’s twenty-six tracks.

== Eddie Duffy and Mick Hoy Memorial Traditional Music Festival ==
In memory of Mick Hoy and Eddie Duffy, the Eddie Duffy and Mick Hoy Memorial Traditional Music Festival takes place every year on the second weekend in October in Derrygonnelly.
