= Farewell and Remember Me =

Studio album by The Boys of the Lough
- Released: 1987
- Recorded: Rel Studios, Edinburgh
- Genre: Folk
- Length: 38:55
- Producers: Peter Harris and Boys of the Lough

The Boys of the Lough chronology
Far From Home - Live (1986)	Farewell and Remember Me (1987)	Sweet Rural Shade (1988)

Farewell and Remember Me is an album by The Boys of the Lough, released in 1987.

There are 4 songs and 6 instrumental tracks on the album which is unusual in giving so much prominence to the uilleann bagpipes. It is sometimes considered to be the best album by The Boys of the Lough. The tunes are mainly sourced from Irish and Scottish traditions, some of them never previously recorded.

== Track listing ==
1. "Sean But/ Tommy People's/ The Lark in the Morning" (jigs) (All traditional)
2. "The Leitrim Queen" (song) (Ian Burns)
3. "Lucky Can Du Link Ony/ Pottinger's/ Billy Nicholson" (reels) (Trad/ Tom Anderson/ Trad)
4. "Farewell and Remember Me" (song) (J Chalmers)
5. "Angus Polka no 1/ Angus Polka No 2/ Donegal Barn Dance" (All trad)
6. "An Spailpin Fanach (sung in Gaelic)/ The One-Horned Buck" (reel) (Trad/ Trad)
7. "Valentia Harbour (air)/ The Jug of Punch (reel)/ MacArthur Road" (reel) (All trad)
8. "Lovely Ann" (unaccompanied song) (Trad)
9. "The Holly Bush/ The New Ships Are Sailing" (reels) (All trad)
10. "The Waterford Waltz/ The Stronsay Waltz" (Trad/ Trad)

The listing above is as printed on the album package. Compare: a more complete and correct track listing at irishtune.info.

== Personnel ==
- Aly Bain - fiddle
- Cathal McConnell - flute, whistle, vocals
- Dave Richardson - concertina, mandolin, cittern
- Christy O'Leary - uilleann pipes, whistle, vocals
- John Coakley - guitar, piano, bodhran, mandoline, fiddle
- Guest: Ron Shaw - cello on "Farewell and Remember Me"
- Engineered by Alistair George
