= Stonecircle =

American Celtic fusion band

Stonecircle is an acoustic Celtic fusion band, formed in 1993 in Salt Lake City, Utah by George Schoemaker. The band's lineup has included Schoemaker (12-string guitar, harmonica, vocals), Krista Baker (fiddle, violin), Nina Cooley (flute, percussion, background vocals), Brian Dobson (uilleann pipes, Irish whistle, bodhran) and Mary Johnston-Coursey (vocals, whistles, percussion). Fiddler and violinist Bronwen Beecher joined as of 2010. The stated goal of the band is "to create a musical experience that is both ethereal and beautifully uplifting".

The band's Celtic fusion sound mixes the style of Celtic folk music with jazz and classical influences. Stonecircle has performed and recorded traditional songs from English, Scottish, Irish, and Breton folk music, along with original vocal and instrumental pieces. Schoemaker wrote many of the original lyrics, drawing from Greek mythology, Celtic folk tales, and historical episodes from France and the British Isles.

Stonecircle has played at numerous concert venues and music festivals in Utah and around the United States, including Kingsbury Hall and the Downtown Olympic Festival during the 2002 Olympic Winter Games. They performed an annual winter solstice concert at the Rose Wagner Performing Arts Center in Salt Lake City for 8 years, with the last concert taking place in 2011.

== Discography ==
- Serendipity (1997)
- Alchemy (2001)
- In Concert (2003)
- Winter Sky (2005)
- Asterisk & Dragonflies: 1997-2007 (2007)
- Metamorphosis (2009)
