= Scottish folk music =

Genre of traditional music from Scotland

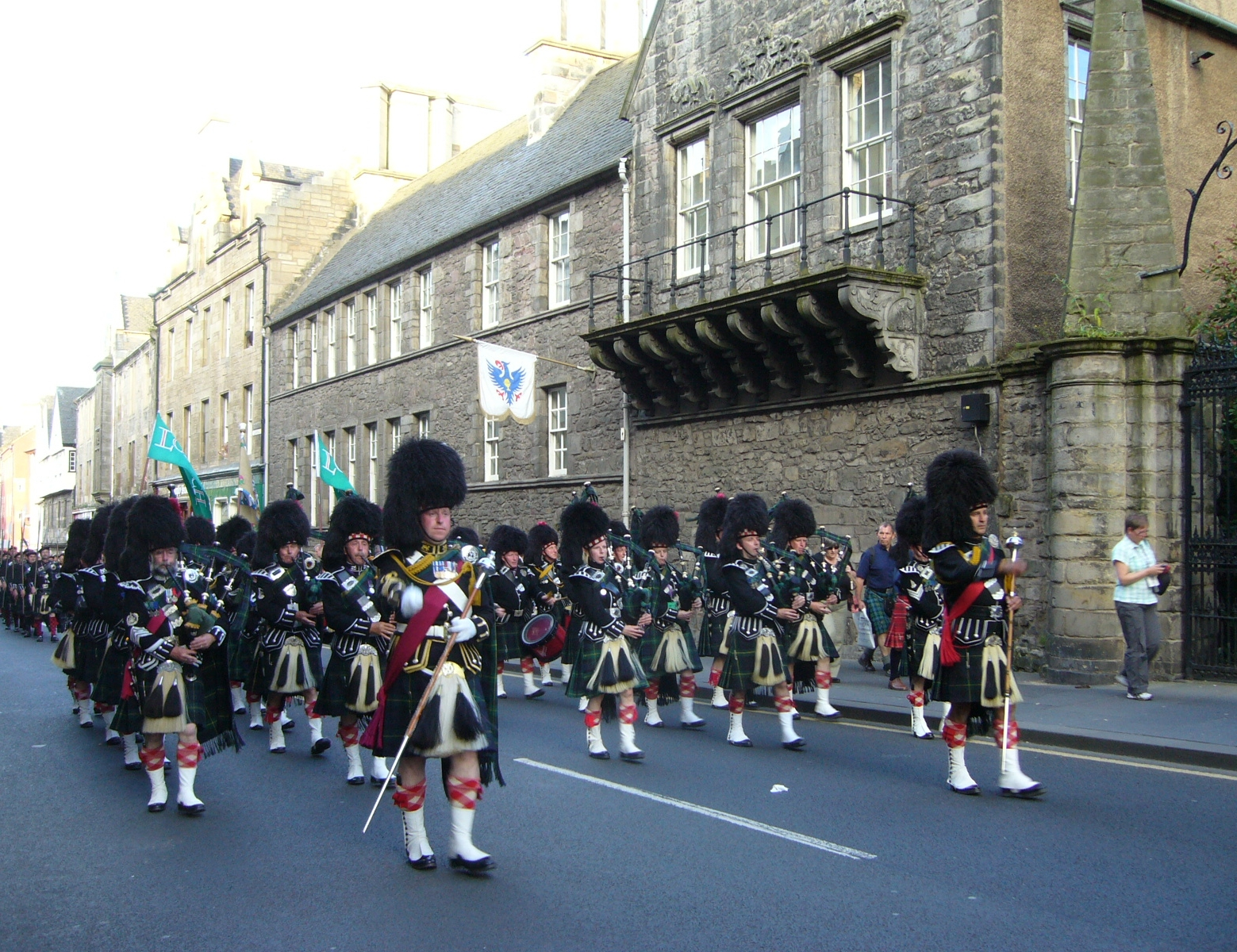
Lonach Pipe band, Edinburgh Scotland, 2009. Pipe bands are among the most recognizable forms of traditional Scottish music.

Scottish folk music (also Scottish traditional music) is a genre of folk music that uses forms that are identified as part of the Scottish musical tradition. There is evidence that there was a flourishing culture of popular music in Scotland during the late Middle Ages, but the only song with a melody to survive from this period is the "Pleugh Song". After the Reformation, the secular popular tradition of music continued, despite attempts by the Kirk, particularly in the Lowlands, to suppress dancing and events like penny weddings. The first clear reference to the use of the Highland bagpipes mentions their use at the Battle of Pinkie Cleugh in 1547. The Highlands in the early seventeenth century saw the development of piping families including the MacCrimmons, MacArthurs, MacGregors and the Mackays of Gairloch. There is also evidence of adoption of the fiddle in the Highlands. Well-known musicians included the fiddler Pattie Birnie and the piper Habbie Simpson. This tradition continued into the nineteenth century, with major figures such as the fiddlers Niel and his son Nathaniel Gow. There is evidence of ballads from this period. Some may date back to the late Medieval era and deal with events and people that can be traced back as far as the thirteenth century. They remained an oral tradition until they were collected as folk songs in the eighteenth century.

The earliest printed collection of secular music comes from the seventeenth century. Collection began to gain momentum in the early eighteenth century and, as the Kirk's opposition to music waned, there was a flood of publications including Allan Ramsay's verse compendium The Tea Table Miscellany (1723) and The Scots Musical Museum (1787 to 1803) by James Johnson and Robert Burns. From the late nineteenth century there was renewed interest in traditional music, which was more academic and political in intent. In Scotland collectors included the Reverend James Duncan and Gavin Greig. Major performers included James Scott Skinner. This revival began to have a major impact on classical music, with the development of what was in effect a national school of orchestral and operatic music in Scotland, with composers such as Alexander Mackenzie, William Wallace, Learmont Drysdale, Hamish MacCunn and John McEwen.

After World War II, traditional music in Scotland was marginalised, but remained a living tradition. This was changed by individuals including Alan Lomax, Hamish Henderson and Peter Kennedy, through collecting, publications, recordings and radio programmes. Traditional singers that they popularised included John Strachan, Jimmy MacBeath, Jeannie Robertson and Flora MacNeil. In the 1960s there was a flourishing folk club culture and Ewan MacColl emerged as a leading figure in the revival in Britain. The clubs hosted traditional performers, including Donald Higgins and the Stewarts of Blairgowrie, beside English performers and new Scottish revivalists such as Robin Hall, Jimmie Macgregor, The Corries and the Ian Campbell Folk Group. There was also a strand of popular Scottish music that benefited from the arrival of radio and television, which relied on images of Scottishness derived from tartanry and stereotypes employed in music hall and variety, exemplified by the TV programme The White Heather Club which ran from 1958 to 1967, hosted by Andy Stewart and starring Moira Anderson and Kenneth McKeller. The fusing of various styles of American music with British folk created a distinctive form of fingerstyle guitar playing known as folk baroque, pioneered by figures including Davy Graham and Bert Jansch. Others totally abandoned the traditional element including Donovan and the Incredible String Band, who have been seen as developing psychedelic folk. Acoustic groups who continued to interpret traditional material through into the 1970s included Ossian, Silly Wizard, The Boys of the Lough, Natural Acoustic Band, Battlefield Band, The Clutha, and The Whistlebinkies.

Celtic rock developed as a variant of British folk rock by Scottish groups including the JSD Band and Spencer's Feat.

Five Hand Reel, who combined Irish and Scottish personnel, emerged as the most successful exponents of the style. From the late 1970s the attendance at, and the number of, folk clubs began to decrease, as new musical and social trends began to dominate. However, in Scotland the circuit of ceilidhs and festivals helped prop up traditional music. Two of the most successful groups of the 1980s that emerged from this dance band circuit were Runrig and Capercaillie. A by-product of the Celtic Diaspora was the existence of large communities across the world that looked for their cultural roots and identity to their origins in the Celtic nations. From the United States this includes Scottish bands Seven Nations, Prydein and Flatfoot 56. From Canada are bands such as Enter the Haggis, Great Big Sea, The Real Mckenzies and Spirit of the West.

== Development ==
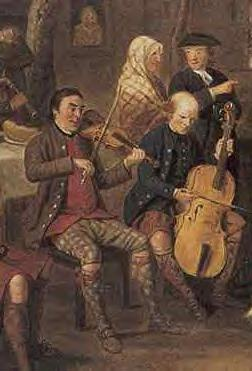
A detail from The Highland Wedding by David Allan, 1780

There is evidence that there was a flourishing culture of popular music in Scotland in the Late Middle Ages. This includes the long list of songs given in The Complaynt of Scotland (1549). Many of the poems of this period were also originally songs, but for none has a notation of their music survived. Melodies have survived separately in the post-Reformation publication of The Gude and Godlie Ballatis (1567), which were spiritual satires on popular songs, adapted and published by the brothers James, John and Robert Wedderburn. The only song with a melody to survive from this period is the "Pleugh Song". After the Reformation, the secular popular tradition of music continued, despite attempts by the Kirk, particularly in the Lowlands, to suppress dancing and events like penny weddings at which tunes were played.

The first clear reference to the use of the Highland bagpipes is from a French history, which mentions their use at the Battle of Pinkie Cleugh in 1547. George Buchanan claimed that they had replaced the trumpet on the battlefield. This period saw the creation of the ceòl mór (the great music) of the bagpipe, which reflected its martial origins, with battle-tunes, marches, gatherings, salutes and laments. The Highlands in the early seventeenth century saw the development of piping families including the MacCrimmonds, MacArthurs, MacGregors and the Mackays of Gairloch. There is also evidence of adoption of the fiddle in the Highlands with Martin Martin noting in his A Description of the Western Isles of Scotland (1703) that he knew of eighteen players in Lewis alone. Well-known musicians included the fiddler Pattie Birnie (c. 1635–1721) and the piper Habbie Simpson (1550–1620). This tradition continued into the nineteenth century, with major figures such as the fiddlers Niel (1727–1807) and his son Nathaniel Gow (1763–1831), who, along with a large number of anonymous musicians, composed hundreds of fiddle tunes and variations.

There is evidence of ballads from this period. Some may date back to the late Medieval era and deal with events and people that can be traced back as far as the thirteenth century, including "Sir Patrick Spens" and "Thomas the Rhymer", but for which there is no evidence until the eighteenth century. Scottish ballads are distinct, showing some pre-Christian influences in the inclusion of supernatural elements such as the fairies in the Scottish ballad "Tam Lin". They remained an oral tradition until increased interest in folk songs in the eighteenth century led collectors such as Bishop Thomas Percy to publish volumes of popular ballads.

== Early song collection ==
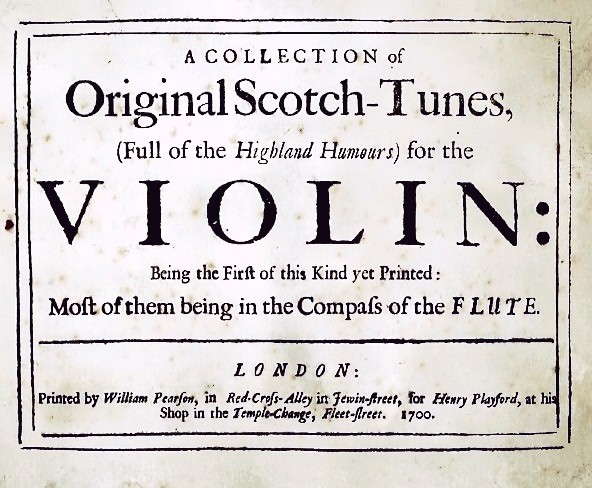
Cover of John Playford's Collection of original Scotch-tunes, (full of the highland humours) for the violin (1700)

In Scotland the earliest printed collection of secular music was by publisher John Forbes, produced in Aberdeen in 1662 as Songs and Fancies: to Thre, Foure, or Five Partes, both Apt for Voices and Viols. It was printed three times in the next twenty years, and contained seventy-seven songs, of which twenty-five were of Scottish origin. Eighteenth century publications included John Playford's Collection of original Scotch-tunes, (full of the highland humours) for the violin (1700), Margaret Sinkler's Music Book (1710), James Watson's Choice Collection of Comic and Serious Scots Poems both Ancient and Modern 1711. The oppression of secular music and dancing by the Kirk began to ease between about 1715 and 1725 and the level of musical activity was reflected in a flood of musical publications in broadsheets and compendiums of music such as the makar Allan Ramsay's verse compendium The Tea Table Miscellany (1723), William Thomson's Orpheus Caledonius: or, A collection of Scots songs (1733), James Oswald's The Caledonian Pocket Companion (1751), and David Herd's Ancient and modern Scottish songs, heroic ballads, etc.: collected from memory, tradition and ancient authors (1776). These were drawn on for the most influential collection, The Scots Musical Museum published in six volumes from 1787 to 1803 by James Johnson and Robert Burns, which also included new words by Burns. The Select Scottish Airs collected by George Thomson and published between 1799 and 1818 included contributions from Burns and Walter Scott. Among Scott's early works was the influential collection of ballads Minstrelsy of the Scottish Border (1802–03).

== Revivals ==
=== First revival ===
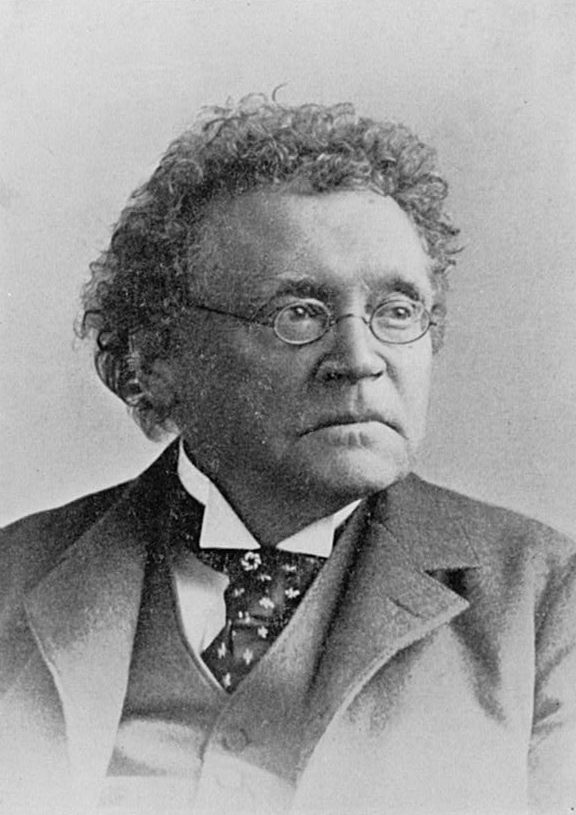
Francis James Child, one of the key figures in beginning the first folk revival

From the late nineteenth century there was renewed interest in traditional music, which was more academic and political in intent. Harvard professor Francis James Child's (1825–96) eight-volume collection The English and Scottish Popular Ballads (1882–92) has been the most influential on defining the repertoire of subsequent performers, and the English music teacher Cecil Sharp was probably the most important in understanding of the nature of folk song. In Scotland, collectors included the Reverend James Duncan (1848–1917) and Gavin Greig (1856–1914), who collected over 1,000 songs, mainly from Aberdeenshire. The tradition continued with figures including James Scott Skinner (1843–1927), known as the "Strathspey King", who played the fiddle in venues ranging from the local functions in his native Banchory, to urban centres of the south and at Balmoral. In 1923 the Royal Scottish Country Dance Society was founded in an attempt to preserve traditional Scottish dances that were threatened by the introduction of the continental ballroom dances such as the waltz or quadrilles. The accordion also began to be a central instrument at Highland balls and dances.

This revival began to have a major impact on classical music, with the development of what was in effect a national school of orchestral and operatic music in Scotland. Major composers included Alexander Mackenzie (1847–1935), William Wallace (1860–1940), Learmont Drysdale (1866–1909), Hamish MacCunn (1868–1916) and John McEwen (1868–1948). Mackenzie, who studied in Germany and Italy and mixed Scottish themes with German Romanticism, is best known for his three Scottish Rhapsodies (1879–80, 1911), Pibroch for violin and orchestra (1889) and the Scottish Concerto for piano (1897), all involving Scottish themes and folk melodies. Wallace's work included an overture, In Praise of Scottish Poesie (1894). Drysdale's work often dealt with Scottish themes, including the overture Tam O’ Shanter (1890), the cantata The Kelpie (1891). MacCunn's overture The Land of the Mountain and the Flood (1887), his Six Scotch Dances (1896), his operas Jeanie Deans (1894) and Dairmid (1897) and choral works on Scottish subjects have been described by I. G. C. Hutchison as the musical equivalent of the Scots Baronial castles of Abbotsford and Balmoral. Similarly, McEwen's Pibroch (1889), Border Ballads (1908) and Solway Symphony (1911) incorporated traditional Scottish folk melodies.

=== Second revival ===
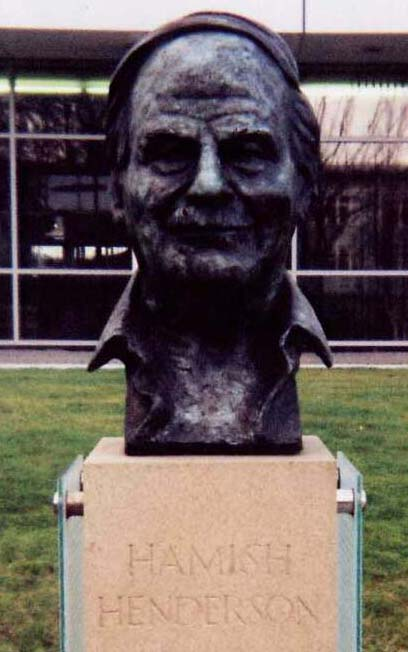
The bust of Hamish Henderson in South Gyle

After World War II, traditional music in Scotland was marginalised, but, unlike in England, it remained a much stronger force, with the Céilidh house still present in rural communities until the early 1950s and traditional material still performed by the older generation, even if the younger generation tended to prefer modern styles of music. This decline was changed by the actions of individuals such as American musicologist Alan Lomax, who collected numerous songs in Scotland that were issued by Columbia Records around 1955. Radio broadcasts by Lomax, Hamish Henderson and Peter Kennedy (1922–2006) were also important in raising awareness of the tradition, particularly Kennedy's As I Roved Out, which was largely based around Scottish and Irish music. The School of Scottish Studies was founded at University of Edinburgh in 1951, with Henderson as a research fellow and a collection of songs begun by Calum Maclean (1915–1960). Acts that were popularised included John Strachan (1875–1958), Jimmy MacBeath (1894–1972), Jeannie Robertson (1908–1975) and Flora MacNeil (1928–2015). A number of festivals also popularised the music, such as Edinburgh People's Festival (1951–1953), Aberdeen Folk Festival (1963–), Girvan Folk Festival (1964–1965 and 1975–present) and Blairgowrie Folk Festival (1966–1971). In the 1960s there was a flourishing folk club culture. The first folk club was founded in London by Ewan MacColl (1915–1989), who emerged as a leading figure in the revival in Britain, recording influential records such as Scottish Popular Ballads (1956). Scottish folk clubs were less dogmatic than their English counterparts which rapidly moved to an all English folk song policy, and they continued to encourage a mixture of Scottish, Irish, English and American material. Early on they hosted traditional performers, including Donald Higgins and the Stewarts of Blairgowrie, beside English performers and new Scottish revivalists such as Robin Hall (1936–1998), Jimmie Macgregor (born 1930) and The Corries. A number of these new performers, including the Ian Campbell Folk Group, emerged from the skiffle movement.

There was also a strand of popular Scottish music that benefited from the arrival of radio and television, which relied on images of Scottishness derived from tartanry and stereotypes employed in music hall and variety. Proponents included Andy Stewart (1933–1993), whose weekly programme The White Heather Club ran in Scotland from 1958 to 1967. Frequent guests included Moira Anderson (born 1938) and Kenneth McKeller (1927–2010), who enjoyed their own programmes. The programmes and their music were immensely popular, although their version of Scottish music and identity was despised by many modernists.

The fusing of various styles of American music with British folk created a distinctive form of fingerstyle guitar playing known as folk baroque, pioneered by figures including Davy Graham and Bert Jansch. This led in part to British progressive folk music, which attempted to elevate folk music through greater musicianship, or compositional and arrangement skills. Many progressive folk performers continued to retain a traditional element in their music, including Jansch who became a member of the band Pentangle in 1967. Others largely abandoned the traditional element of their music. Particularly important were Donovan (who was most influenced by emerging progressive folk musicians in America such as Bob Dylan) and the Incredible String Band, who from 1967 incorporated a range of influences including medieval and Eastern music into their compositions, leading to the development of psychedelic folk, which had a considerable impact on progressive and psychedelic rock. Acoustic groups who continued to interpret traditional material through into the 1970s included Ossian and Silly Wizard. The Boys of the Lough and Battlefield Band, emerged from the flourishing Glasgow folk scene. Also from this scene were the highly influential The Clutha, whose line up, with two fiddlers, was later augmented by the piper Jimmy Anderson, and the Whistlebinkies, who pursued a strongly instrumental format, relying on traditional instruments, including a Clàrsach (Celtic harp). Many of these groups played largely music originating from the Lowlands, while later, more successful bands tended to favor the Gaelic sounds of the Highlands. While fairly popular within folk circles, none of these groups achieved the success of Irish groups such as The Chieftains and The Dubliners. Some of these bands produced noted solo artists, including Andy M. Stewart of Silly Wizard, Brian McNeill of Battlefield Band, and Dougie MacLean of the Tannahill Weavers. MacLean is perhaps the best known of these, having written "Caledonia", one of Scotland's most beloved songs.

Though perhaps not as popular as some of their Celtic fusion counterparts, traditional Scottish artists are still making music. These include Hebridean singer Julie Fowlis, 'Gaelic supergroup' Dàimh, and Lau. Old Blind Dogs have also found success singing in the Doric Scots dialect of their native Aberdeenshire. Albannach has gained recognition for their distinctive combination of pipes and drums.

=== Celtic rock ===
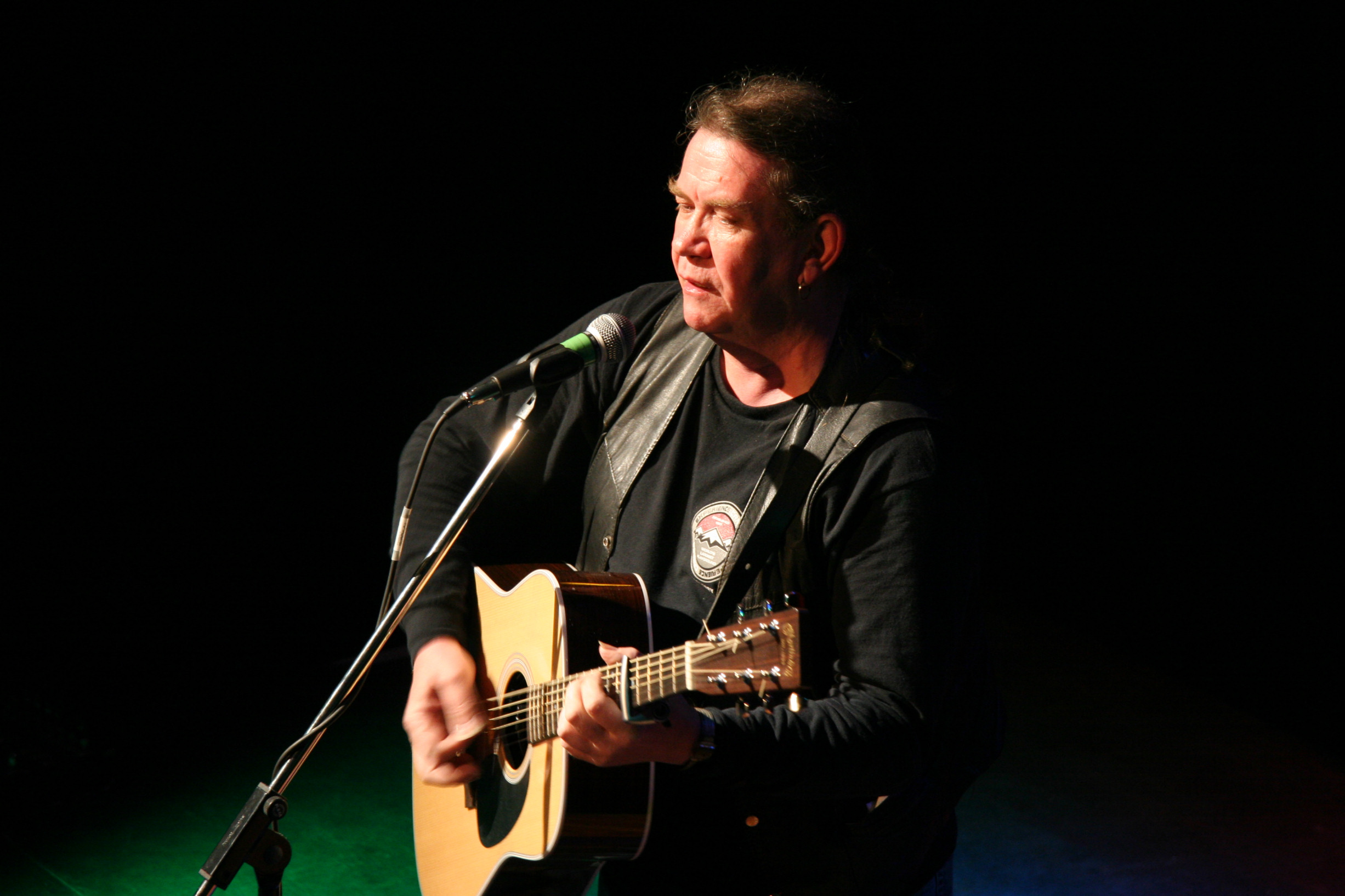
Dick Gaughan live at the "Rätsche" in Geislingen/Steige (Germany) in 2006

Celtic rock developed as a variant of British folk rock, playing traditional Scottish folk music with rock instrumentation, developed by Fairport Convention and its members from 1969. Donovan used the term "Celtic rock" to describe the folk rock he created for his Open Road album in 1970, featured a song with "Celtic rock" as its title. The adoption of British folk rock heavily influenced by Scottish traditional music produced groups including the JSD Band The Natural Acoustic Band (1970) and Spencer's Feat. Out of the wreckage of the latter in 1974, guitarist Dick Gaughan formed probably the most successful band in this genre Five Hand Reel, who combined Irish and Scottish personnel, before he embarked on an influential solo career.

From the late 1970s the attendance at, and number of, folk clubs began to decrease, as new musical and social trends, including punk rock, new wave and electronic music began to dominate. However, in Scotland the circuit of cèilidhs and festivals helped prop up traditional music. Two of the most successful groups of the 1980s emerged from this dance band circuit. From 1978, when they began to release original albums, Runrig produced highly polished Scottish folk rock, including the first commercially successful album with all Gaelic lyrics, Play Gaelic in 1978. From the 1980s Capercaillie combined Scottish folk music, electric instruments and haunting vocals to considerable success. While bagpipes had become an essential element in Scottish folk bands they were much rarer in folk rock outfits, but were successfully integrated into their sound by Wolfstone from 1989, who focused on a combination of highland music and rock. More recently, bands such as Mànran and Tide Lines have also focused on a combination of Celtic music and pop-rock. Additionally, groups such as Shooglenifty and Peatbog Faeries mixed traditional highland music with more modern sounds, such as dubstep rhythms, creating a genre sometimes referred to as "Acid Croft". Niteworks inspired the two aforementioned bands and the electronic sampling of Martyn Bennett have further developed Celtic electronic music which has been described as both Gaelictronica and Celtictronica.

Successful Scottish stadium rock acts such as Simple Minds from Glasgow and Big Country from Dunfermline incorporated traditional Celtic sounds onto many of their songs. The former based their hit "Belfast Child" around the traditional Irish song "She Moved Through the Fair" and incorporated accordion into their line-up, while the latter's guitar and drum sounds on their early albums were heavily influenced by Scottish pipe bands, particularly on songs such as "In a Big Country" and "Fields of Fire". Big Country also covered Robert Burns' "Killiecrankie".

One by-product of the Celtic Diaspora was the existence of large communities across the world that looked for their cultural roots and identity to their origins in the Celtic nations. While it seems young musicians from these communities usually chose between their folk culture and mainstream forms of music such as rock or pop, after the advent of Celtic punk relatively large numbers of bands began to emerge styling themselves as Celtic rock. This is particularly noticeable in the United States and Canada, where there are large communities descended from Irish and Scottish immigrants. From the U.S. this includes Seven Nations, Prydein and Flatfoot 56. From Canada are bands such as Enter the Haggis, Great Big Sea, The Real Mckenzies and Spirit of the West. These groups were influenced by American forms of music, some containing members with no Celtic ancestry and commonly singing in English. The mandolin has become increasingly common in Scottish folk ensembles during the 21st century, particularly within acoustic duos and contemporary folk groups drawing influence from both traditional dance tunes and modern Celtic arrangements.
