= Five Hand Reel =

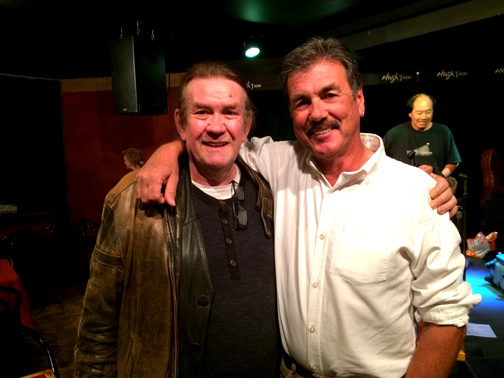
Gaughan & Lyons at a concert in Toronto September 2015

Five Hand Reel was a Scottish/English/Irish Celtic rock band of the late 1970s, that combined experiences of traditional Scottish and Irish folk music with electric rock arrangements. The members of the band were Dick Gaughan (born 17 May 1948), Bobby Eaglesham (1942–2004), Tom Hickland (1948–2020), Barry Lyons (born 1950), Dave Tulloch (1951-2026) and later Sam Bracken.

== History ==
Five Hand Reel was formed originally in 1975 from the remnants of UK electric folk band Spencer's Feat: bassist Barry Lyons (ex Mr. Fox & Trees), Tom Hickland on fiddle and keyboards, and drummer Dave Tulloch. Enlisting two Scottish musicians, fiddler Chuck Fleming and singer/guitarist Bobby Eaglesham, they decided to call themselves Five Hand Reel. They started gigging in late 1975, playing their first London show at King's Cross Cinema. However, in early 1976, Chuck Fleming, returned to his previous band, the JSD Band. His replacement was the Scottish singer and guitarist Dick Gaughan, an ex member of The Boys of the Lough. The live debut of the renewed band was at the Half Moon in Putney in mid 1975.

Five Hand Reel signed with Rubber Records in 1976 and recorded their first album, Five Hand Reel, at Impulse Studios in Newcastle on Tyne. It was voted as "Folk Album of the Year" for 1976 by Melody Maker.

The second album, For A' That, was recorded, now from RCA Records, in July 1977, at the height of the punk summer of discontent. The opening "Bratach Bana" was one of the first Gaelic songs to be recorded using rock elements. The Irish band Horslips had recorded the same song in Gaelic on their album Happy To Meet - Sorry to Part, also in a rock arrangement. As Dick Gaughan says in his notes to the album: "It seems odd in these days when it is now perfectly normal to sing Gaelic songs in a contemporary fashion that this was regarded as extremely daring and adventurous in 1977. We've come a long, long way since those days."

Much of Five Hand Reel's live work was on club, college, and folk festivals of England and Northern Europe. They were very popular in Scandinavia and recorded an album of traditional Danish songs Ebbe, Dagmar, Svend og Alan with Danish folk singer and radio presenter Alan Klitgaard. In England they were slightly less popular, though highly appreciated in the North East folk clubs, punk clubs and at The Half Moon, Putney, as a live act.

In 1978, Five Hand Reel's third RCA album, Earl O'Moray, was recorded in Rockfield Studios in Monmouth, Wales and produced by Simon Nicol of Fairport Convention. It was rather different from the two previous LPs: a darker sounding, more seriously minded album with a rich passionate undercurrent.

In late 1978, Dick Gaughan decided to leave the band, after his young daughter was involved in a road accident, and he realised he needed to be at home at this time to support his family. He later resumed his solo career. His replacement for a short time was Sam Bracken, a guitarist and singer from Belfast. Bracken's Irish accent sounded fresh but the rejuvenated band recorded only one more album, 1979's A Bunch Of Fives for Topic Records before finally splitting in 1980. RCA also issued a compilation, Nothing But The Best, that year.

After the break-up, the members of Five Hand Reel pursued various solo projects. Bobby Eaglesham released his second (after 1973's Bobby Eaglesham) album, Weather The Storm in 1982. He contributed backing vocals on Dick Gaughan's 1988 solo album, Call It Freedom, started Festival Folk at the Royal Oak Pub in Edinburgh, toured with Chuck Fleming, and contributed to the compilation CDs of The Songs of Robert Burns. Later he graduated as an artist from Edinburgh College of Art, with residencies in the US and UK. Bobby Eaglesham died from a heart attack in 2004. In late 2016, Gaughan withdrew from public performances, to recover from the effects of a stroke. He returned to limited performances in late 2018. On 15 April 2020, Tom Hickland died after a battle with cancer and complications brought on by the COVID-19 pandemic. Dave Tulloch passed in March 2026 after a long stroke related disability.

Drummer Dave Tulloch rejoined forces with Dick Gaughan on A Different Kind Of Love Song. Tom Hickland played in a trio called The Pub Band, doing The Beatles/Buddy Holly/folk rock material. Sam Bracken recorded with his wife Elaine Bracken, a singer/flautist, a duet CD Once More Around The Block in 2003. Barry Lyons played both in a duo and band with Paul King from Mungo Jerry and later with Jamie Marshall & Grahame White until his departure to Canada in 1996. He worked for a Canadian company, Long & McQuade Musical Instruments in Toronto until 2012, he now runs his own business.

== Discography ==
=== Albums ===
- 5 Hand Reel (1976)
- For A' That (1977)
- Earl O'Moray (1978)
- A Bunch of Fives (1979)

=== With Alan Klitgaard ===
- Ebbe, Dagmar, Svend og Alan (1977)

=== Compilation albums ===
- Nothing but the Best (1980)
