= Pelicula Films =

Pelicula Films is a Vancouver and Montreal based production company which develops, produces and distributes films and documentaries

Pelicula was founded in 2010 by Oz Yilmaz (filmmaker) and is known for its documentaries focusing on local artists and cultural events
