= Flora MacNeil =

Scottish Gaelic Traditional singer (1928–2015)

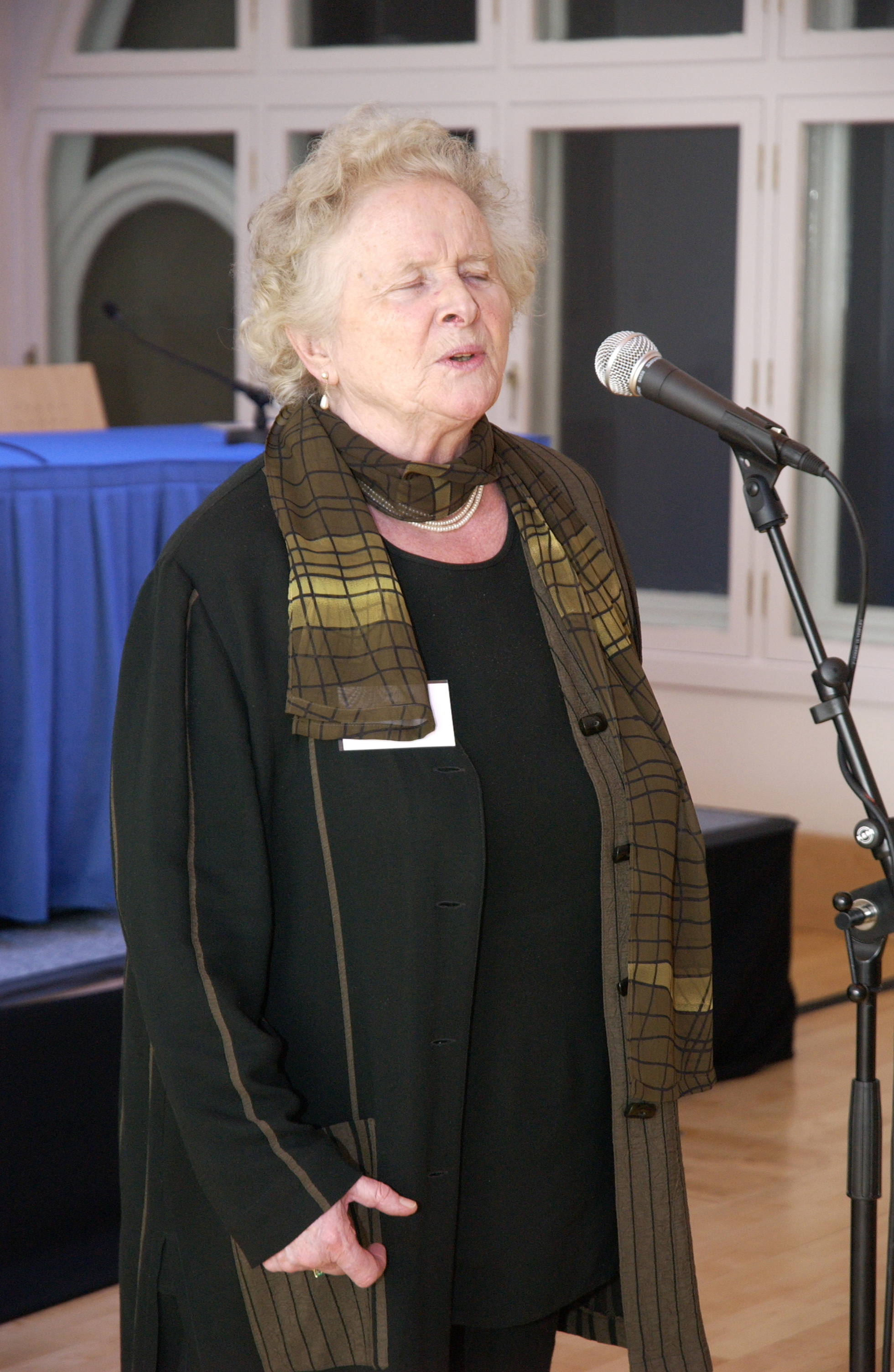
- MacNeil in 2006
- Born: 6 October 1928; Castlebay, Barra, Scotland
- Died: 15 May 2015 (aged 86)

Flora MacNeil, MBE (6 October 1928 – 15 May 2015) was a traditional singer of Scottish Gaelic folk music. MacNeil gained prominence after meeting Alan Lomax and Hamish Henderson during the early 1950s, and continued to perform into her later years.

== Early life ==
MacNeil was born in 1928 into a Gaelic-speaking and Roman Catholic family inside her parents' croft at Ledag, Castlebay, on the island of Barra, which is sometimes called, "the island the Reformation never reached". There were singers on both sides of the MacNeil family, but the menfolk were often away at sea for long periods, leaving the women to raise the children and tend the croft – while constantly singing to assuage their labours. Her mother was Ann Gillies. Her father, Seumas MacNeil, worked as a fisherman and died when Flora was 14.

In these pre-television and pre-radio days, ceilidhs were a regular occurrence on Barra, and from earliest childhood MacNeil later remembered "soaking up" literally hundreds of songs, as if by osmosis. While most of MacNeil's repertoire was learned from her mother, one of Flora's other sources was her mother's cousin, Mary Johnstone. Johnstone's parents had lived locally, but had been evicted during the Highland Clearances. They had moved first to Bernerary and then to Mingulay, before their daughter moved back to her ancestral district on Barra. In later years, Johnstone would regularly visit Flora's mother and often sang at local ceilidhs and, for this reason, Flora's repertoire also included many Gaelic songs from both Benerary and Mingulay.

By age four, famously, MacNeil was already tackling the sophisticated Jacobite war poetry of Mo rùn geal òg ("My Fair Young Love"), one of the Òrain Mòr, or "Big Songs".

"Traditional songs tended to run in families and I was fortunate that my mother and her family had a great love for the poetry and the music of the old songs. It was natural for them to sing, whatever they were doing at the time or whatever mood they were in. My aunt Mary, in particular, was always ready, at any time I called on her, to drop whatever she was doing, to discuss a song with me, and perhaps, in this way, long forgotten verses would be recollected. So I learned a great many songs at an early age without any conscious effort. As is to be expected on a small island, so many songs deal with the sea, but, of course, many of them may not originally be Barra songs. Nevertheless the old songs were preserved more in the southernmost islands of Barra and South Uist possibly because the Reformed Church tended to discourage music elsewhere."

== Music career ==
Following her father's death, a 14-year old Flora left school to work in the island's telephone exchange to help provide for her family. In 1949, the Post Office offered her a position in Edinburgh, where she immediately moved. Word of MacNeil's talents as a Gaelic singer had already preceded her and she was embraced by Edinburgh Communist poets and folk song promoters Hugh MacDiarmid, Hamish Henderson and Sorley MacLean. With their assistance, she found a public platform in the burgeoning round of Edinburgh ceilidhs and concerts that marked the first stirrings of the British folk revival. Sorley MacLean and Hamish Henderson also arranged for American musicologist Alan Lomax to meet MacNeil and record her singing. When Lomax first arrived in Scotland in June 1951, he later recalled, "It was in Edinburgh one June night in the house of Sorley MacLean, a poet, that Scotland really took hold of me. A blue-eyed girl from the Hebrides was singing." The girl was Flora MacNeil and the song was Cairistiona.

Henderson also invited MacNeil to perform at the 1951 Edinburgh People's Festival Ceilidh. The ceilidh brought Scottish traditional music to a large public stage for the first time inside Edinburgh's Oddfellows Hall and continued long afterwards at St. Columba's Church Hall in August 1951. The Scottish Gàidhealtachd was represented at by Flora MacNeil, fellow Barra native Calum Johnston, and John Burgess. The music was recorded live at the scene by Alan Lomax. MacNeil performed, Mo rùn geal òg, Christine Ferguson's lament for her husband, William Chisholm of Strathglass, who fell as part of the Jacobite Army while bearing the standard of Clan Chisholm at the Battle of Culloden in 1746.

She then performed the Waulking song Cò siod thall air stràid na h-eala? ("Who is That Yonder on the Swan Road?"). followed with the Gaelic lament, Mo nighean donn bhòidheach ("My Lovely Brown-Haired Girl").

In 1975, Peter Kennedy acknowledged MacNeil as the source for each of the 24 Scottish Gaelic songs which appeared in his volume Folksongs of Britain and Ireland.

Flora MacNeil recorded two albums, Craobh nan Ubhal in 1976 (reissued in 1993) and Orain Floraidh in 2000.

While performing in 2000 at the annual Christmas Island Ceilidh in Cape Breton, Nova Scotia, MacNeil spread her arms wide and cried, "You are my people!" The hundreds of Canadian-born Gaels in the audience erupted into loud cheers.

In 2005, Alan Lomax's recording of the 1951 Ceilidh was released for purchase on compact disc by Rounder Records. This and all of Lomax's other recordings have since been digitized and made available online by the Association for Cultural Equity.

In 2026 her songs recorded by Dr James Kalokerinos between 1955 and '61 were made available by her daughter with the support by Creative Scotland and others.

== Personal life ==
In 1955, Flora MacNeil married fellow Barra native, Alister MacInnes, who worked as a lawyer in Glasgow, where the couple raised their five children; Kenneth, Cairistiona, Seumas, Maggie and Donald.

== Death and legacy ==
Flora MacNeil died after a short illness on 15 May 2015, aged 86.

Numerous Gaelic traditional singers such as Karen Matheson and Julie Fowlis have cited MacNeil as an important influence on their careers.

Flora's daughter, Maggie MacInnes, is also a Gaelic traditional singer and harpist.
