= Robin Morton =

Robin Morton may refer to:

- Robin Morton (musician), Irish folk musician
- Robin Morton (cycling), American cycling team manager
