= Prydein (band) =

American Celtic rock group

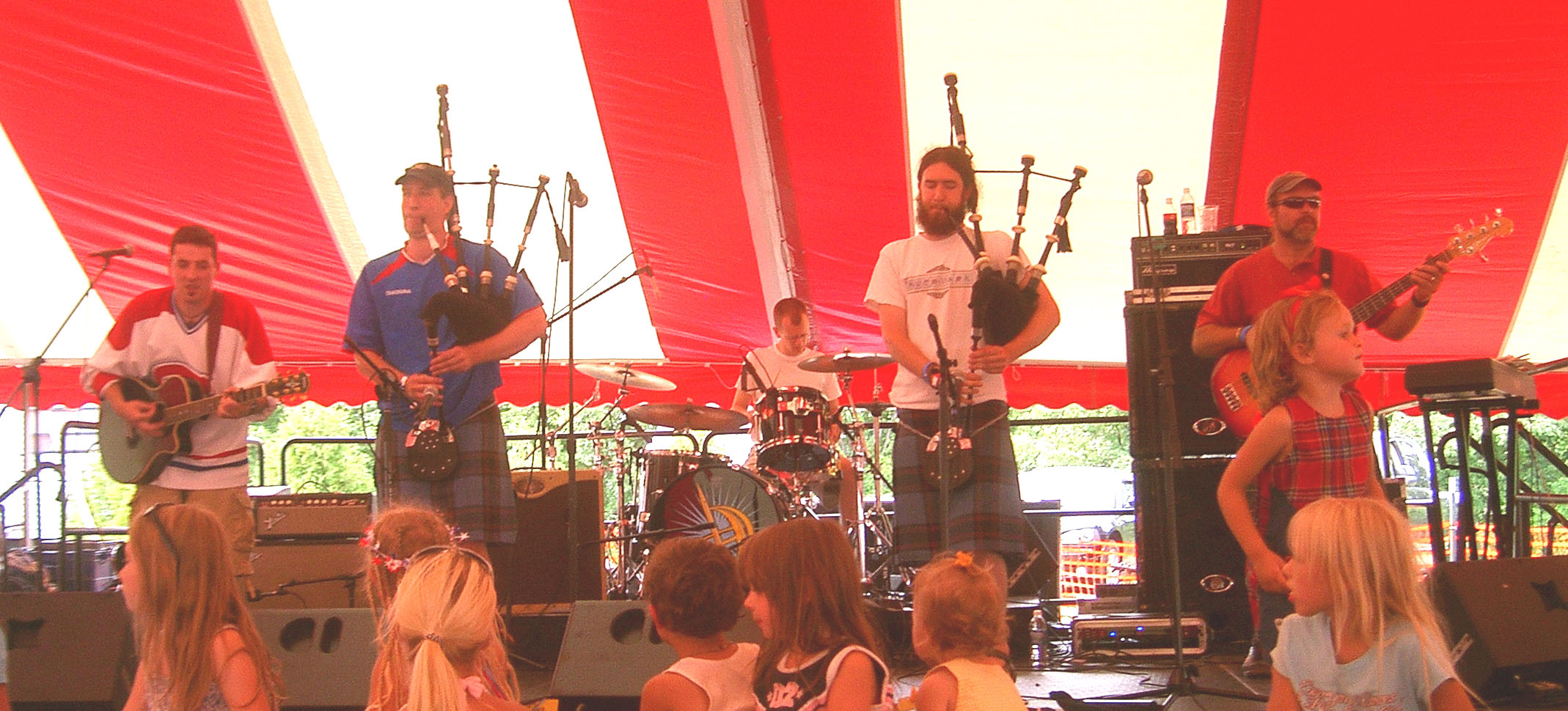
- Prydein at the Detroit Highland Games (photo by Al Hall)

Background information
- Origin: Burlington, Vermont
- Genres: Celtic rock
- Years active: 1999 – present
- Label: Kynsfolk Records
- Members: Aron Garceau; Iain Mac Harg; Hazen Metro; Andy Smith; Caleb Bronz
- Past members: Willa Davie; Dan Houghton; Andrew Adams; Jeff Margolis; Peter Kelly
- Website: http://www.prydein.com

Prydein is an American Celtic rock group formed in 1999. They are notable for their use of bagpipes in a rock band setting. They were formed in Burlington, Vermont, and have released five albums to date. Prydein has played many major festivals up and down the East Coast and the Midwest United States, including the Celtic Classic, New Hampshire Highland Games, and the Detroit Highland Games, and have been featured at the Eastern States Exposition for five years and the New World Festival for 10 years.

== History ==
=== 1995-1998: Whisky Before Breakfast ===
Prydein came about when the band Whisky Before Breakfast split up and the members went different ways. Whisky Before Breakfast started in March 1996 by a group of University of Vermont students. Three out of five of the members came from the UVM Living and Learning Center's "Experimental Music Program." Joined by traditional bagpiper Iain MacHarg (Highland and Lowland bagpipes, flute, penny whistle) and fiddler Ellery Klein (later of Gaelic Storm), Whisky Before Breakfast released its first official CD in April 1997, titled Hell's Brook. Originally recorded in September 1996, the album came out after Whisky's fiddler, Ellery, had moved to Japan to teach English. Throughout the year, the remaining four (Aron Garceau, Sam Hooker, Eric Garland and Iain MacHarg) went on to form a Celtic-rock quartet. The band's sound changed immensely, filling out the parts to counter the loss of the fiddle.

In 1998, the group produced and recorded its second album, Time Well Spent. After the release of this album and a summer tour, the group broke up after playing the Celtic Classic.

=== 1999-2000: Early days ===
Prydein was formed in 1999, just after the breakup of Whisky Before Breakfast. Aron Garceau and Iain MacHarg decided that they wanted to continue on in the genre and had a lot of music left to play. Their first album, Unfinished Business, came out in 1999 with Peter Kelly on drums. The role of bass wasn't filled when work on the CD first started. Vermont musician Aaron Flynn played bass on half the album and Jeff Margolis was later recruited to become Prydein's fourth member and finished playing the rest of the bass parts. After touring in support of the album for a year, taking the band to Virginia and New Hampshire, Aron and Iain decided to end the band for a while, as busy schedules and personality conflicts came into play.

=== 2001-2005: Middle years ===
In 2001, Iain got a call to perform at the New World Festival in Randolph, Vermont. Pete and Jeff had already left the band, so Iain recruited Andrew Adams to play the part of drummer and Aron recruited a bassist. Aron had been playing in the jazz sextet Jazzmosis, and he recruited Jazzmosis bassist Andy Smith to Prydein. With this lineup, the band performed in Florida for the SASF Highland Games and New World Festival every year. The boys were joined by a fifth member, Hazen Metro on highland bagpipes, a student of Iain's and member of Iain's Catamount Pipe Band.

=== 2006-2014: Modern era ===
In 2006, Aron recruited Jazzmosis drummer Caleb Bronz to join the band after Andrew Adams moved on. The band was also joined by another highland bagpiper, 16-year-old Willa Davie, another of Iain's students and member of the Catamount Pipe Band. This lineup played their first gig on Main Street in Concord, New Hampshire for Concord Market Days. As Hazen and Willa each graduated high school and moved on to college Prydein become a quartet again, often joined on stage by other pipers who happened to be in the audience. In 2007, the band recorded its second album, Loud Pipes (Save Lives) with its trademark set ender, "Stairway to Scotland", a version of Amazing Grace and Scotland the Brave. The band later recorded a third album, Heads Up, which was released in 2010. After the release of Heads Up the band was joined by Dan Houghton (founding member of the Scottish band Cantrip) who plays bagpipes, flute and bouzuki.

== Music ==
Prydein has been compared to Celtic-music-meets Motörhead and AC/DC. Christopher Toler of Shite 'n' Onions said "although the band does dip a toe into the pools of funk, ska, rockabilly, metal, and of course, Celtic music, they are at their heart a rock band.".

== Discography ==
- Unfinished Business (1999)
- Loud Pipes (save lives) (2007)
- Heads Up (2010)
- Live at the Fort (2012)
