= Oz Yilmaz (filmmaker) =

Canadian filmmaker

Oz Yilmaz (born May 1, 1972) is a Canadian director, photographer, scenarist, author poet, and actor. He has created several film and art projects focusing on artists and art, including Portragram, which was screened on April 1, 2016, in Montreal's art center, Phi. Oz Yilmaz also created a mini series titled Kooples for the Gay Pride in Montreal which highlighted LBGT couples and was premiered on August 10, 2016, in Montreal.

Yilmaz has authored eight books including Liberatus, Obituaries from Heaven, and Afterhours.
