= Phil Colclough =

English contemporary folk singer and songwriter (1940–2019)

Phil Colclough (11 January 1940 – 23 September 2019) was an English contemporary folk singer and songwriter. His best known works, co-written with his wife, June Colclough (1941 – 12 October 2004), are "A Song for Ireland" (first recorded in 1977) and "The Call and the Answer".

June and Phil Colclough both came from north Staffordshire, England, and both had careers in education. Phil had been a navigator in the Merchant Navy, which provided source material for some of his songs. The Colcloughs founded the first folk music club in Stoke-on-Trent in 1960.

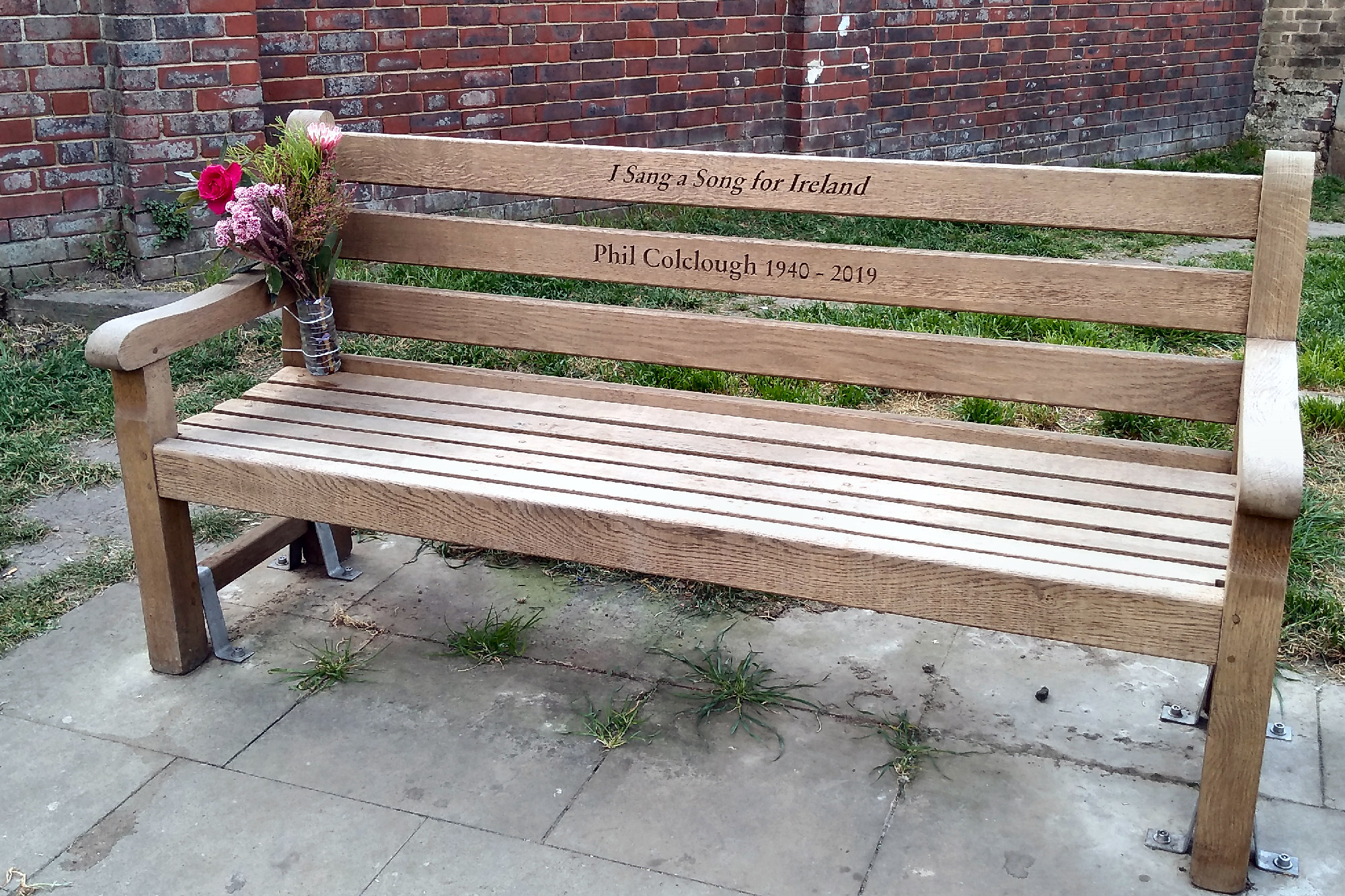
Phil Colclough's bench by the Thames

In 1966, they moved to London, where they were members of the Critics Group led by Ewan MacColl and Peggy Seeger; they eventually left the group due to disputes stemming from they described as MacColl's "authoritarian tendencies".

In the 1970s, the Colcloughs returned to North Staffordshire, where they produced a folk music radio program for BBC Radio Stoke.

"A Song for Ireland" was inspired by a trip the Colcloughs took to the Dingle Peninsula. Described as a "modern classic", it has been recorded by several artists, including Dick Gaughan, Luke Kelly, Mary Black, Ralph McTell, The Dubliners, Damien Leith, and Scott Appel.

== Discography ==
- Players from a Drama (1991)
