= Aly Bain =

Scottish fiddler

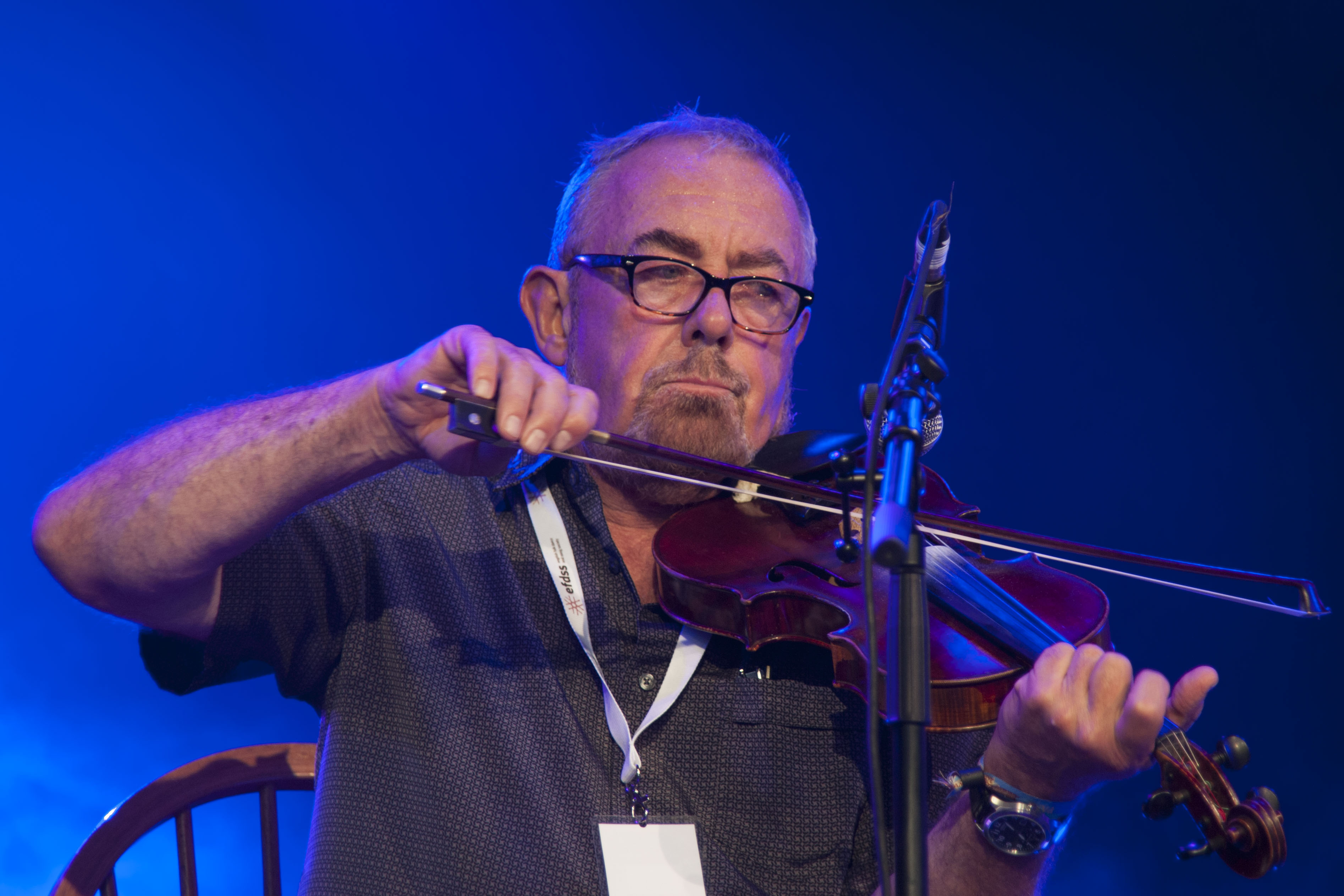

Background information
- Born: 15 May 1946 (age 80)
- Origin: Lerwick, Shetland, Scotland
- Genres: Folk, Traditional, Celtic, World Music
- Occupation: Musician
- Instrument: Fiddle/viola
- Years active: 1968–present
- Label: Whirlie Records

Aly Bain MBE (born 15 May 1946) is a Scottish fiddler who learned his instrument from the old-time master Tom Anderson. The former First Minister of Scotland Jack McConnell called Bain a "Scottish icon."

== Career ==
Bain was born in the town of Lerwick, in the Shetland Islands of Scotland. In the early years of his career, he was—briefly and unofficially—part of the band The Humblebums with Gerry Rafferty, Billy Connolly and Tam Harvey. He was one of the members of the band "Gordon Hank and the Country Ramblers", which also included Gordon Smith, Ian Stewart and Jack Robertson in 1967 and was based in Shetland.

He became nationally prominent as a founding member of The Boys of the Lough, a Scots-Irish folk group, with whom he played for over 30 years.

Simultaneously, Bain pursued a solo career in collaborative and television projects with Pelicula Films director Mike Alexander and producer Douglas Eadie, working on several international television series: The Down home Recordings (which described how fiddling music spread from Scotland and Ireland to America), The Shetland Sessions (recorded at the Shetland folk festival in 1991), Aly Meets The Cajuns, and six series of the Transatlantic Sessions.

Since the early eighties, Bain has regularly collaborated and recorded with prominent, international musicians, including: Phil Cunningham, Jerry Douglas, Emmylou Harris, Norman Blake, Mark O'Connor, Jay Ungar, Mary Black, Mairéad Ní Mhaonaigh, Dan Tyminski, Rosanne Cash, James Taylor, Eddi Reader, Paul Brady, Darrell Scott, Michael Doucet, Martha Wainwright, Kate & Anna McGarrigle, John Martyn, Danny Thompson, Iris DeMent, Karen Matheson, Karan Casey, Donal Lunny, Joan Osborne, Allison Moorer, Bruce Molsky and Allan MacDonald, bringing traditional music to a wider audience.

In 1989, Bain played at the Carnegie Hall in New York, USA, to a capacity crowd.

In 1993, his autobiography Fiddler on the Loose, co-written with Alastair Clark, was published by "Mainstream".

In 1999 Bain played at the first opening of the Scottish Parliament in Edinburgh.

In 2000, Bain played at the funeral of the Scottish first minister Donald Dewar.

In 2006, a television programme celebrating Bain's 60th birthday was broadcast by the BBC, documenting his life and works. The same year, Bain was inducted into the Scots Traditional Music Hall of Fame.

In 2009, Bain collaborated with Nicola Benedetti to create a television programme for BBC Scotland: When Nicola Benedetti Met Aly Bain, broadcast the same year.

In 2010, Bain made a further hour-long television programme for BBC with Pelicula Films and Billy Connolly: Fishing for Poetry, celebrating the life and works of the Scottish Poet Norman MacCaig.

In 2012, Bain and Cunningham celebrated their 25th anniversary of touring as a fiddle and accordion duo. Bain also tours with Swedish multi-instrumentalist Ale Möller (with whom he has recorded two albums) and with American old-time fiddler, singer, guitarist and banjo player Bruce Molsky; as a trio, they released their first album in 2013.

== Honours and awards ==
Bain has received many honours for his services to music.

In 1989, he received a Silver Disc from the Record Industry Association for his Aly Meets the Cajuns recording. A further Silver Disc followed in 1991 for The Pearl, recorded on his own Edinburgh Record Label, Whirlie Records.

In 1994, he was awarded the MBE for his musical accomplishments.

He also has received five honorary Doctor of Music (DMus) degrees from: Royal Scottish Academy of Music and Drama; Stirling University; The University of St Andrews (2003); The Open University (2005) and Edinburgh University (2009).

In 2005, he and Phil Cunningham won the BBC's "Best Duo of the Year" award.

On 27 November 2007, Bain and Cunningham were awarded Doctor of Letters from Glasgow Caledonian University for their contributions to music and to the education and encouragement of young musicians.

In 2010, Bain won the BBC Radio 2 Folk "Good Tradition Award".

In the 2013 BBC Radio 2 Folk Awards, Bain was honoured with a lifetime achievement award.

He has also received several honorary doctorates in the US.

== Personal life ==
Bain has three daughters – Annalese, Jessica and Sophie who were respectively 48, 47 and 31 years old in 2026.

He endorsed the independence campaign in the Scottish independence referendum, 2014.

== Discography ==
=== Solo albums ===
- Aly Bain (1984)
- Lonely Bird (1992)
- The Best of Aly Bain:Volume One:A Fiddler's Tale (2008)

=== From television series ===
- The Legendary Down Home Recordings
- Aly Bain Meets The Cajuns (1994)
- Aly Bain and Friends (1994)
- Aly Bain and Young Champions (2005)
- The Shetland Sessions [Vol. 1] (1992)
- The Shetland Sessions [Vol. 2] (1993)

=== Transatlantic Sessions ===
- Transatlantic Sessions 3 [Vol.1] (2007) (with Jerry Douglas and various artists)
- Transatlantic Sessions 3 [Vol.2] (2008) (with Jerry Douglas and various artists)
- The Original Transatlantic Sessions [Vol.1] (2008) (with Jay Ungar and various artists)
- The Original Transatlantic Sessions [Vol.2] (2008) (with Jay Ungar and various artists)
- The Original Transatlantic Sessions [Vol.3] (2009) (with Jay Ungar and various artists)
- Transatlantic Sessions 4[Vol.1] (2009) (with Jerry Douglas and various artists)
- Transatlantic Sessions 4[Vol.2] (2010) (with Jerry Douglas and various artists)
- Transatlantic Sessions 4[Vol.3] (2010) (with Jerry Douglas and various artists)
- Transatlantic Sessions 5[Vol.1] (2011) (with Jerry Douglas and various artists)
- Transatlantic Sessions 5[Vol.2] (2012) (with Jerry Douglas and various artists)
- Transatlantic Sessions 5[Vol.3] (2012) (with Jerry Douglas and various artists)
- Transatlantic Sessions 2[Vol.1] (2013) (with Jerry Douglas and various artists)
- Transatlantic Sessions 2[Vol.2] (2013) (with Jerry Douglas and various artists)
- Transatlantic Sessions 2[Vol.3] (2013) (with Jerry Douglas and various artists)
- Transatlantic Sessions 6[Vol.1] (2013) (with Jerry Douglas and various artists)

=== With Mike Whellans ===
- Aly Bain – Mike Whellans (1971)

=== With Willie Johnson ===
- Shetland Folk Fiddle Volume 2 (1976)

=== With The Boys of the Lough ===
- The Boys of the Lough (1973)
- Second Album (1973)
- Recorded Live (1975)
- Lochaber No More (1975)
- The Piper's Broken Finger (1976)
- Good Friends-Good Music (1977)
- Wish You Were Here (1978)
- Re-Grouped (1980)
- In the Tradition (1981)
- Open Road (1983)
- Far from Home (1986)
- Welcoming Paddy Home (1986)
- Farewell and Remember Me (1987)
- Sweet Rural Shade (1988)
- Live at The Carnegie Hall (1989)
- The Fair Hills of Ireland (1992)
- The Day Dawn (1994)
- The West of Ireland (1999)

In 2009 Paidriag O'Keefe's/Con Cassidy's from In The Tradition was included in Topic Records 70 year anniversary boxed set Three Score and Ten as track fourteen on the third CD.

=== With Tom Anderson ===
- The Silver Bow (1976) (1995) (2008)

In 2009 Soldier's Joy from The Silver Bow was also included in Three Score and Ten as track seven on the fourth CD.

=== With Phil Cunningham ===
- The Pearl (1995)
- The Ruby (1997)
- Another Gem (2000)
- Spring the Summer Long (2003)
- Best of Aly and Phil Volume One (2004)
- Roads Not Travelled (2006)
- Portrait (2010)
- Five and Twenty (2012)
- Best of Aly and Phil Volume Two (2013)

=== With Ale Möller ===
- Fully Rigged (1999)
- Beyond the Stacks (2007)
- Meeting Point Aly Bain, Ale Moller and Bruce Molsky (2013)

=== With Kvifte, Sommerro, Yndestad and Solberg ===
- North Sea Music (2006)

=== With BT Scottish Ensemble ===
- Follow the Moonstone (1995) arr. Henning Sommerro

=== DVDs ===
- Another Musical Interlude (2004) (with Phil Cunningham)
- Transatlantic Sessions Series 3 (2007) (with Jerry Douglas and various artists)
- The Original Transatlantic Sessions: Series 1 (2008) (with Jay Ungar and various artists)
- Transatlantic Sessions Series 4 (2009) (with Jerry Douglas and various artists)
- Transatlantic Sessions Series 5 (2011) (with Jerry Douglas and various artists)
- Transatlantic Sessions Series 2 (2012) (with Jerry Douglas and various artists)
- Aly Meets The Cajuns (2012) (with Dewey Balfa and various artists)
- Transatlantic Sessions Series 6 (2013) (with Jerry Douglas and various artists)
