= The Boys of the Lough =

Celtic music band

- Origin: Edinburgh, Scotland
- Genre: Scottish traditional music
- Years active: 1967–present
- Members: Kevin Henderson; Cathal McConnell; Brendan Begley; Garry Ó Briain
- Past members: Tommy Gunn; Mike Whellans; Aly Bain; Dick Gaughan; Dave Richardson; Tich Richardson (Died 1984); John Coakley; Robin Morton (Died 2021); Malcolm Stitt; Christy O'Leary

The Boys of the Lough is a Scottish-Irish Celtic music band active since 1967.

== Early years ==
Their first album, called Boys of the Lough (1972) consisted of Aly Bain (fiddle), Cathal McConnell (flute and whistle), Dick Gaughan (vocals and guitar and mandolin) and Robin Morton (bodhran and concertina and vocals).

Since the 1960s, the Forrest Hill Bar in Edinburgh had been a centre for folk singers and instrumentalists. In the pub, always nicknamed "Sandy Bell's" and now formally called that, fiddler Aly Bain played along with singer/guitarists Mike Whellans and Dick Gaughan in sessions. Aly Bain was from the Shetland Islands, and steeped in the Shetland style of playing. Meanwhile, in Ireland, Cathal McConnell was an All-Ireland champion in both flute and whistle. He was from a family of flute players in County Fermanagh in Northern Ireland. Cathal's musical collaborators were Tommy Gunn and Robin Morton. The two halves met at Falkirk folk festival in Scotland, and formed Boys of the Lough.

In 1973, Gaughan left to pursue a solo career and the Northumberland musician Dave Richardson (concertina, mandolin, cittern) joined. This line-up was constant for the next six albums. Richardson was also a writer of new material. They played ensemble instrumentals and the occasional song, equally divided between traditional sources from Ireland and Scotland.

== Regrouped ==
The Boys of the Lough 1978/79 tour was billed as their final tour. However, they returned a year later with Regrouped (1980). Robin Morton had left to found a Scottish folk music label called Temple Records (featuring such groups as the Battlefield Band). The "Regrouped" line-up had two new members, and eventually fiddler John Coakley was added, who remained with the group for the next 12 years. Their 1980s sound also included Christy O'Leary from County Kerry (uilleann pipes), who had previously toured with De Dannan. Tich Richardson (guitar, bass) died in a car accident in Scotland in September 1984. In 1992, Boys of the Lough played at Carnegie Hall.

== 1990s ==
In 1994, the band released The Day Dawn. John Coakley left the band.

== 2000s ==
In 2002, the band released Lonesome Blues and Dancing Shoes. They invited guests to appear for a single album. Chris Newman (guitar) and Kathryn Tickell (Northumbrian pipes) sat in with them on tours and albums. After 32 years, Aly Bain left to play with other musicians, most notably Phil Cunningham (accordion), and was replaced in 2002 by fellow Shetland fiddler Kevin Henderson of Fiddlers' Bid.

In 2006, Boys of the Lough participated in TG4's Geantraí. An album of the same name was issued in 2007, with contributions from Boys of the Lough, Gerry O'Connor, Joe Burke, Noel Hill, Mairtín O'Connor and others.

In 2009, "Paidraig O'Keefe's/Con Cassidy's" from In The Tradition was included in Topic Records 70 year anniversary boxed set Three Score and Ten, as track fourteen on the third CD.

In 2021, Robin Morton died suddenly.

== Discography ==
=== Albums ===
- The Boys of the Lough (1973)
- Second Album (1973)
- The Boys of the Lough III (Live at Passim) (1974)
- Lochaber No More (1976)
- The Piper's Broken Finger (1976), illustrated by James Marsh
- Good Friends ... Good Music (1977)
- Wish You Were Here (1978)
- Regrouped (1980)
- In the Tradition (1981)
- Open Road (1983)
- To Welcome Paddy Home (1985)
- Far from Home (Live) (1986)
- Farewell and Remember Me (1987)
- Sweet Rural Shade (1988)
- Live at Carnegie Hall (1992)
- The Fair Hills of Ireland (1992, 1993)
- The Day Dawn (1994)
- Midwinter Night's Dream (1996)
- The West of Ireland (1999)
- Lonesome Blues and Dancing Shoes (2002)
- Twenty (2005)
- Midwinter Live (2007)
- Rising Fawn Gathering with Norman & Nancy Blake, James & Rachel Bryan (2009)
- The New Line (2014)

=== As contributing artists ===
- Festival De Saint-Laurent, 1 Et 2 Juin 1974 (1974) - includes live recordings of "Boom Boom Reel" & "Morning Dew Reel"
- Finn McCoul (1991) - performing music for the audiobook by Brian Gleeson, narrated by Catherine O'Hara
- Førde Internasjonale Folkemusikkfestival (1999) - includes a live recording of "Jigs Frå Ireland"
- Geantraí (2006) - performing "The Steamboat/The Sheffield Hornpipe"
- The Best of Woodsongs Volume Three (2009) - includes a live recording of "Erin Gra Mo Chroi"

=== Anthologies ===
- The Session (1991) - a compilation from the albums In the Tradition, Regrouped, and Open Road
