= Cathal McConnell =

- Born: 8 June 1944 (age 82); Bellanaleck, County Fermanagh, Northern Ireland
- Genres: Folk, Traditional, Celtic
- Occupations: Irish musician and singer
- Instruments: flute, whistle

Cathal McConnell (born 8 June 1944) is an Irish musician and singer best known as the mainstay of traditional band The Boys of the Lough, of which he is a founder member. His main instruments are the Irish flute and the tin whistle.

Following a lifetime immersed in traditional music and song, Cathal McConnell is currently gathering his collection of music and memorabilia for deposit with the Irish Traditional Music Archive in Dublin. This project has also allowed ITMA to record some of Cathal's memories of his musical friendship with the great Donegal fiddler, Tommy Peoples. 2023-24 projects include recording 'McConnell's Variations on Whistle and Flute' with Nuala Kennedy.

== Early life ==
McConnell came from a musical family in Tonyloman near Bellanaleck, County Fermanagh and plays his music in the traditional Fermanagh style. His father Sandy was a well known traditional singer and musician in his own right and recorded for the BBC in the 1950s and his younger brother is the musician and songwriter Mickey MacConnell.

McConnell's early musical collaborators in Ireland were fiddler Tommy Gunn and Robin Morton. In 1962 McConnell became All-Ireland champion in both flute and whistle.

== The Boys of the Lough ==
After meeting at a folk festival in Falkirk, Scotland, the group The Boys of the Lough was formed and their first recording was released in 1973. Originally consisting of McConnell on flute, Aly Bain (fiddle), Dick Gaughan (vocals and guitar) and Robin Morton (bodhran and vocals). Although there have now been multiple line-up changes, the group remains active and has 21 studio albums to its name. McConnell is the only remaining founder member.

== Other projects ==
Outside the Boys of the Lough, Cathal has released two albums of songs and tunes, performed in duos with Robin Morton (1939–2021), Scots fiddler Duncan Wood, singer Len Graham, Irish fiddler Gerry O'Connor, among others. In 2010 Gerry O'Connor compiled a collection from Cathal's song repertoire, published as I Have Travelled This Country.

In Scotland, where he has lived for many years you will often find Cathal McConnell performing with his friend, Gaelic piper and singer Allan MacDonald or as The Cathal McConnell Trio with Kathryn Nicoll (fiddle and viola) and Karen Marshalsay (harp). He has also performed and recorded with Michelle Burke and with Nuala Kennedy.

== Accolades ==
1962: McConnell is an All-Ireland champion in both flute and whistle, winning both Senior titles at the Fleadh Cheoil na hÉireann held in Gorey, County Wexford.

2009: Following a longstanding involvement with the annual Willie Clancy Summer School in Miltown Malbay, County Clare, the School paid tribute to McConnell with an evening of speeches, music and song dedicated to him in July 2009.

2010: McConnell was awarded Amhránaí na Bliana/Traditional Singer of the Year at the TG4 Gradam Ceoil awards ceremony in Wexford Opera House. This honour was acknowledged in Cathal's adopted hometown when The Consulate General of Ireland in Edinburgh hosted a reception to mark the occasion.

2013: As part of his appearance at Cruinniú na bhFliúit Flute Festival in Baile Bhúirne, West Cork, Cathal was interviewed about his life and music.

== Discography ==
See also The Boys of the Lough discography.

- An Irish Jubilee with Robin Morton – Topic Records (1976)
- On Lough Erne's Shore – Topic Records (1978)
- For the Sake of Old Decency with Len Graham – Sage Arts Records (1993)
- Long Expectant Comes at Last – Compass Records (2000)
- Auld Springs Gies Nae Price with Duncan Wood – Carnyx Productions (2010)
- Old Recordings of Slow Airs (2021)

Other recordings include:

- a series of whistle recordings included with the tutor book Irish Pennywhistle Taught By Cathal McConnell published by Homespun Tapes.
- an extensive series of recordings documenting Cathal's song repertoire included with the book I Have Travelled This Country.
