= Hamish Henderson =

Scottish writer

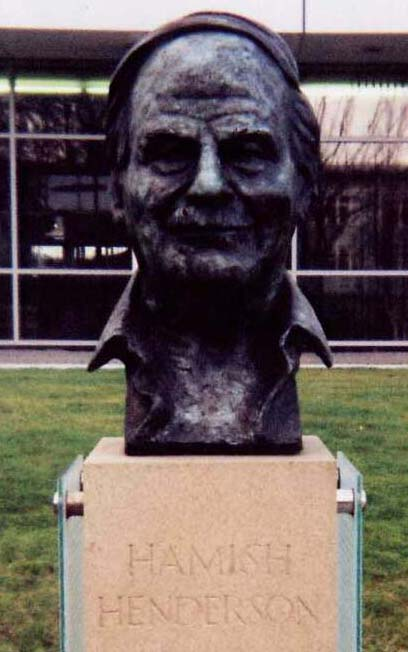
- Henderson's bust in South Gyle, Edinburgh
- Born: James Hamish Scott Henderson; 11 November 1919; Blairgowrie, Perthshire, Scotland
- Died: 9 March 2002 (aged 82); Edinburgh, Scotland
- Education: Dulwich College; Downing College, Cambridge
- Spouse: Kätzel
- Children: 2

(James) Hamish Scott Henderson (11 November 1919 – 9 March 2002) was a Scottish poet, songwriter, communist, intellectual and soldier.

Henderson was a catalyst for the folk revival in Scotland. He was also an accomplished folk song collector and discovered such notable performers as Jeannie Robertson, Flora MacNeil and Calum Johnston.

== Early life ==
He was born in Blairgowrie, Perthshire on the first Armistice Day 11 November 1919, to a single mother, Janet Henderson, a Queen's Nurse who had served in France, and was then working in the war hospital at Blair Castle. His father was the army officer James Scott (1874–1934). Henderson's name was recorded at registration as James, but he preferred the Scots form, Hamish.

Henderson spent his early years in nearby Glen Shee and Dundee, and then moved to England with his mother. He attended Lendrick School in Bishopsteignton, a preparatory school where the headmaster was James Maclaren. Janet Henderson died in 1933, and Maclaren became his guardian. Around this time he won a scholarship to Dulwich College in London. He studied Modern Languages at Downing College, Cambridge, in the years leading up to World War II. As a visiting student in Germany he ran messages for an organization run by the Society of Friends aiding the German resistance and helping to rescue Jews.

== World War II ==
He took part in the Desert War in Africa, during which he wrote his poem Elegies For the Dead in Cyrenaica, encompassing every aspect of a soldier's experience of the sands of North Africa. On 2 May 1945, Henderson personally oversaw the drafting of the surrender order of Italy issued by Marshal Rodolfo Graziani.

Henderson collected the lyrics to "D-Day Dodgers," a satirical song to the tune of "Lili Marlene", attributed to Lance-Sergeant Harry Pynn, who served in Italy. Henderson also wrote the lyrics to "The 51st (Highland) Division's Farewell to Sicily", set to a pipe tune called "Farewell to the Creeks". The book in which these were collected, Ballads of World War II, was published "privately" to evade censorship, but earned Henderson a ten-year ban from BBC radio, preventing a series on ballad-making from being made. His 1948 war poetry book, Elegies for the Dead in Cyrenaica, received the Somerset Maugham Award.

== Folk song collector ==
Henderson threw himself into the work of the folk revival after the war, discovering and bringing to public attention Jeannie Robertson, Flora MacNeil, Dolina MacLennan, Calum Johnston and others. In the 1950s, he acted as a guide to the American folklorist, Alan Lomax, who collected many field recordings in Scotland.

== People's Festival Ceilidhs ==
Henderson was instrumental in bringing about the Edinburgh People's Festival Ceilidh in 1951, which placed traditionally performed Scottish folk music on the public stage for the first time as "A Night of Scottish Song". However, the People's Festival, of which it was part, was planned as a left-wing competitor to the Edinburgh Festival and was deeply controversial. At the event, Henderson performed The John Maclean March, to the tune of Scotland the Brave, which honoured the life and work John Maclean, a communist and Scottish nationalist hero.

However, the event marked the first time that Scotland's traditional folk music was performed on a public stage. The performers included Flora MacNeil, Calum Johnston, John Burgess, Jessie Murray, John Strachan, and Jimmy MacBeath. The event was extremely popular and was regarded as the beginning of the second folk revival.

Henderson continued to host the events every year until 1954, when the Communist ties of several members of the People's Festival Committee led to the Labour Party declaring it a "Proscribed Organisation". Losing the financial support of the local trades unions, the People's Festival was permanently cancelled. Henderson's own songs, particularly "Freedom Come All Ye", have become part of the folk tradition themselves.

== Later life ==
Dividing his time between Continental Europe and Scotland, he eventually settled in Edinburgh in 1959 with his German wife, Kätzel (Felizitas Schmidt).

Henderson collected widely in the Borders and the north-east of Scotland, creating links between the travellers, the bothy singers of Aberdeenshire, the Border shepherds, and the young men and women who frequented the folk clubs in Edinburgh.

From 1955 to 1987 he was on the staff of the University of Edinburgh's School of Scottish Studies alongside other prominent ethnologists including Calum Maclean. There he contributed to the sound archives, some of which are now available online on Tobar an Dulchais. Henderson held several honorary degrees and after his retirement became an honorary fellow of the School of Scottish Studies. For many years he held court in Sandy Bell's Bar, the meeting place for local and visiting folk musicians. In April 1979, he was ' the prevailing spirit' at the first Edinburgh International Folk Festival conference 'The People's Past' both on ballads and in challenging traditional history telling. He also spoke at a Riddle's Court meeting which had hosted in the past, the Workers' Educational Association when he said that Calvinism was repressive in the Scottish psyche and that 'we had to divest ourselves of layers or preconception and misconception before we could come to grips with Scotland and its people.'

Henderson was a socialist, and beside his academic work for the University, he produced translations of the Prison Letters of Antonio Gramsci, whom he had first heard of among Communist Italian partisans during the war. The translation was published in the New Edinburgh Review in 1974 and as a book in 1988. He was involved in campaigns for Scottish home rule and in the foundation of the 1970s Scottish Labour Party. Henderson, who was openly bisexual, was vocal about gay rights and acceptance.

In 1983, Henderson was voted Scot of the Year by Radio Scotland listeners when he, in protest of the Thatcher government's nuclear weapons policy, turned down an OBE.

== Death ==
He died in Edinburgh on 8 March 2002 aged 82, survived by his wife Kätzel and their daughters, Janet and Christine Henderson.

== Legacy ==
In 2005, Rounder Records released a recording of the 1951 Edinburgh People's Festival Ceilidh as part of The Alan Lomax Collection. Henderson had collaborated with the preparations for the release.

In August 2013, Edinburgh University announced that it had acquired his personal archive of "more than 10,000 letters from almost 3400 correspondents, plus 136 notebooks and diaries", dating from the 1930s to the end of his life. These will be kept in the Special Collections department of the main library. The annual Carrying Stream Festival is Edinburgh Folk Club’s celebration of Henderson’s life and legacy.

Discussions around national identity and constitutional resettlement in Scotland, especially those surrounding the Scottish Independence Referendum of 2014, have often invoked Henderson's legacy. Politicians and cultural commentators alike describe their admiration for his song 'Freedom Come-All-Ye' and lend their voices to those touting it as an alternative national anthem. As a radical democrat whose political beliefs were closely bound up in the study of folk culture and high literature, Henderson's work expresses a tension between romantic nationalism and socialist internationalism which has been reaffirmed in public life in Scotland since his death.

Debate on his parenting, and a possible link to the eighth Duke of Atholl or a 'cousin' of that lineage, has continued into considering the 'cultural context' of the eighth Duke's role in designing the Scottish National War Memorial (opened 1927) bringing together the culture of 'the people', but also looking into Henderson possibly being of royal or aristocratic blood, 'acknowledging a heritage that meant a lot to him, while still protecting his anonymity, and the power of his life's work to identify with everyman and everywoman.' Paul Potts had called Henderson "That guy? He's one of the wandering kings of Scotland."
