= Across the Borders =

Live album by The Battlefield Band
- Released: 11 February 1997
- Genre: Celtic
- Length: 66:10
- Label: Temple
- Producer: Robin Morton

The Battlefield Band chronology
Threads (1995)	Across the Borders (1997)	Live Celtic Folk Music (1998)

Professional ratings
Review scores
Source	Rating
Allmusic	link

Across the Borders, a live album by Battlefield Band, was released in 1997 on the Temple Records label. The total running time is 66:10.

== Track listing ==
1. "Miss Sarah Macmanus/Appropriate Dipstick/Cape Breton Fiddlers' Welcome" – 4:06
2. "Tramps and Hawkers" – 6:09
3. "Snow on the Hills/Xesus & Felisa" – 4:30
4. "The Concert Reel/The Green Mountain", with Eric Rigler – 2:24
5. "The Arran Convict", with Seamus Tansey – 4:40
6. "My Home Town/Kalabakan", with Eric Rigler – 3:40
7. "Tuireadh Iain Ruaidh", with Alison Kinnaird – 4:54
8. "The Trimdon Grange Explosion" – 4:09
9. "Simon Thoumire's Jig/Shake a Leg/Ríl Gan Ainm" – 4:05
10. "Miss Kate Rusby", with Eric Rigler – 4:26
11. "The Green and the Blue", with Eric Rigler and Kate Rusby – 5:25
12. "The Donnie MacGregor/Clumsy Lover" – 3:05
13. "Woe Be Gone/Bubba's Reel/Frank's Reel", with Alison Kinnaird – 6:41
14. "Six Days on the Road", with The Radio Sweethearts – 4:15
15. "In and Out the Harbour/The Top Tier/Sleepy Maggie/Molly Rankin" – 3:41

== Personnel ==
=== Battlefield Band ===
- Alan Reid
- Iain MacDonald
- Alistair Russel
- John McCusker

=== Guests ===
- Alison Kinnaird
- Kate Rusby
- Seamus Tansey
- Eric Rigler
- The Radio Sweethearts

== Sources and links ==
- Across the Borders at AllMusic
