= Home Is Where the Van Is =

Studio album by The Battlefield Band
- Released: 1980
- Genre: Celtic
- Length: 43:23
- Label: Temple
- Producer: Robin Morton

The Battlefield Band chronology
Stand Easy	Home Is Where the Van Is	The Story So Far

Professional ratings
Review scores
Source	Rating
Allmusic	4.5/5 stars

Home Is Where the Van Is, an album by The Battlefield Band, was released in 1980 on the Temple Records label. The album, the band's U.S. debut, "continued the Scottish group's affinity for blending modern instrumentation into the country's folk tradition." Several songs from the album notably featured band member Ged Foley on the Northumbrian smallpipes.

== Track listing ==
1. "Major Malley's March & Reel/Malcolm Currie" – 2:27
2. "Bonny Barbry-O" – 3:18
3. "Look Across the Water/Mrs Garden of Troup/The Keelman Ower Land" – 4:29
4. "Braw Lads O'Galla Water" – 3:35
5. "Up & Waur Them A', Willie" – 3:25
6. "Joseph McDonald's Jig/The Snuff Wife/Thief of Lochaber" – 3:56
7. "Cockle Geordie/Miss Graham/Miss Thompson" – 4:01
8. "The Boar and the Fox" – 4:10
9. "Blackhall Rocks" – 2:53
10. "The Lads O' the Fair" – 4:05
11. "The Cowal Gathering/The Iron Man/Dancing Feet/Dick Gossip's Reel" – 4:34
12. "Mary Cassidy" – 2:30

== Personnel ==
=== Battlefield Band ===
- Alan Reid: vocals, organ, synthesizer, electric piano
- Brian McNeill: vocals, bouzouki, fiddles, cittern, concertina, hurdy-gurdy, viola
- Duncan MacGillivray: vocals, Highland pipes, whistles, guitar, mouthorgan, bagpipes, harmonica
- Ged Foley: vocals, mandolin, guitar, Northumbrian smallpipes

=== Guests ===
Also appearing on some songs are :

- sound engineer Martin Colledge on tenor banjo/electric guitar (tracks 6, 7, 12) and
- producer Robin Morton on bodhran (track 6).

== Performances ==
The band played the album in its entirety at the 2009 Celtic Connections, as part of the festival's Classic Albums series. The performance featured the line-up who recorded the album in 1980 (Alan Reid, Brian McNeill, Duncan MacGillivray & Ged Foley), playing together with the line-up of 2009 (Alan Reid, Mike Katz, Alasdair White & Sean O'Donnell).
