= Happy Daze (Battlefield Band album) =

2001 album by the Battlefield Band

Studio album by The Battlefield Band
- Released: 27 February 2001
- Genre: Celtic
- Length: 63:03
- Label: Temple
- Producer: Robin Morton

The Battlefield Band chronology
Leaving Friday Harbor	Happy Daze	Time and Tide

Professional ratings
Review scores
Source	Rating
Allmusic	4/5 stars

Happy Daze, an album by the Battlefield Band, was released in 2001 on the Temple Records label.

== Track listing ==
1. "The Devil's Courtship / An Dro" – 3:47
2. "Medium Man / Floating Candles / Nighean Cailleach nan Cearc" – 3:58
3. "The Banks of Red Roses" – 5:17
4. "Tiny Wee Vin / The Road to the Aisle" – 4:14
5. "The Riccarton Tollman's Daughter" – 4:15
6. "Shepherd Lad" – 3:53
7. "The Merry Macs / Dr. Iain Mac Aonghais" – 4:24
8. "Happy Days" – 4:55
9. "Whaur Will We Gang? / March of the Ceili Man" – 3:21
10. "A Mile Down the Road /Johnny's Jig / Boys of the Puddle" – 4:30
11. "Start It All over Again" – 5:05
12. "Wee Michael's March / Oot B'est da Vong" – 4:03
13. "Love No More" – 3:38
14. "Blue Bonnets over the Border / Khazi" – 3:52
15. "The 24th Guards Brigade at Anzio / The Melbourne Sleeper / MacRae's of Linn" – 3:51

== Personnel ==
=== Battlefield Band ===
- Alan Reid (keyboards, vocals)
- Karine Polwart (lead vocals, guitar)
- John McCusker (fiddle, whistle, cittern)
- Mike Katz (Highland pipes, small pipes, various whistles...)
