= Rain, Hail or Shine =

Studio album by The Battlefield Band
- Released: 7 April 1998
- Genre: Celtic
- Length: 45:38
- Label: Temple
- Producer: Robin Morton

The Battlefield Band chronology
Live Celtic Folk Music	Rain, Hail or Shine	Leaving Friday Harbor

Professional ratings
Review scores
Source	Rating
Allmusic	link

Rain, Hail or Shine, an album by The Battlefield Band, was released in 1998 on the Temple Records label. The total running time is 45:38.

== Track listing ==
1. "Bodachan a Gharaidh/General Macdonal/Craig an Fhithich" – 3:47
2. "Heave Ya Ho" – 4:30
3. "Margaret Ann/Manor Park/Trip to the Bronx" – 5:24
4. "Jenny O' the Braes" – 3:23
5. "Magheraclone/Norland Wind/Royal Scottish Pipers Soc./Gardez Loo/Donald" – 9:24
6. "The Beaches of St. Valery/Elizabeth Clare" – 6:27
7. "Wee Michael's March/Oot B'est da Vong" – 4:03
8. "The Lass O' Glencoe" – 4:24
9. "The Canongate Twitch/Steamboat to Detroit/Twenty Pounds of Gin/Break Yer Ba" – 6:54

== Personnel ==
=== Battlefield Band ===
- Alan Reid (keyboards, guitar, vocals, writing...)
- Davy Steele (lead vocals, writing...)
- John McCusker (fiddle, whistle...)
- Mike Katz (Highland pipes, small pipes, various whistles...)

== Sources and links ==
- Rain, Hail or Shine at AllMusic
