= Alasdair White =

- Born: 1983 (age 42–43); Isle of Lewis, Outer Hebrides, Scotland
- Genres: Scottish folk music
- Instruments: fiddle (main instrument), whistle, banjo, bouzouki, mandolin, Highland and Small pipes
- Formerly of: Battlefield Band

Alasdair White is a Scottish folk musician born in 1983 on the Isle of Lewis, Outer Hebrides, Scotland. In 2001, when he was only 18 years old, he joined Battlefield Band as a virtuoso fiddle player.

== Origins ==
White is a Scottish Gaelic speaker, and originates from Tong on the Isle of Lewis one of Scotland's Outer Hebrides islands, a geographical area where the Gaelic language and culture are of great importance to its native inhabitants; it is this, combined with general Scottish culture that influences White's playing style.

White's chief instrument is the fiddle, which he generally plays in West-Highland and North-West styles; these styles being heavily derived from a culture with a rich piping tradition. He also plays the whistle, banjo, bouzouki, mandolin, Highland and Small pipes, 'and probably anything else he can lay his hands on!'

== Early career ==
White's musical career started while still at school playing with Face the West, releasing their first CD, Edge of Reason, while still at school. The band continued on when White left to join Battlefield Band and have just released their second album. White appeared with Face the West at the Hebridean Celtic Festival in July 2009 for a Face the West and Friends gig on the main stage.

== Battlefield Band ==
White joined Battlefield Band in September 2001 and appeared for the first time on a Battlefield Band album on Time and Tide (2002). Since then, he appeared on all Battlefield Band subsequent (studio) albums: Out for the Night (2004), The Road of Tears (2006), Dookin' (2007), Zama Zama... Try Your Luck (2009), Line-up (2011), Room Enough For All (2013) and their latest album to date Beg & Borrow (2015).

== Solo career ==
Aside from Battlefield Band, White released a solo album in 2006 entitled An Clár Geal (The White Album). This album features thirteen tracks, traditional Scottish arrangements as well as White's own work. On this album, White worked with musicians Ewen McPherson (Banjo/Guitar/Mandolin/Tromb), Aaron Jones (10-string bouzouki/Bass), Iain Copeland (Percussion), Russel Hunter (Piano), Alison Kinnaird (Scottish Harp) and fellow Battlefield Band member Mike Katz (Highland Pipes/Scottish Small Pipes in keys C and A). In early 2008, An Clàr Geal won in The 7th Annual Independent Music Awards for Best Traditional World Album.

White is currently touring the US with the talented Scottish group Dàimh, temporarily replacing their regular fiddler, Gabe McVarish who has started a micro-brewery in Scotland and cannot currently tour outside the country.

== Discography ==
- FTW001 Face the West - Edge of Reason
- COMD2086 Christine Primrose - Gun Sireadh, Gun Iarraidh
- COMD2089 Pat Kilbride - Nightingale Lane
- COMD2093 Various Artists - The Portraits and the Music
- COMD2090 Battlefield Band - Time & Tide
- COMD2094 Battlefield Band - Out For The Night
- COMD2095 Mike Katz - A Month of Sundays
- COMD2096 Alison Kinnaird - The Silver String
- COMD2098 Battlefield Band - The Road of Tears
- COMD2099 Alasdair White - An Clàr Geal
- COMD2100 Battlefield Band - Dookin'
- COMD2101 Mike Whellans Fired-Up & Ready
- FTW002 Face The West - The Wishing Stone [CD]
- Niall Kirkpatrick Ceilidh Band - The Iona Connection (2005)
- Niall Kirkpatrick Ceilidh Band - West Coast Swing (2007)
- WSFTW003 Face The West - "The Young Fear Nothing" (2012)
