= Mac-Talla (band) =

Scottish Gaelic band

- Origin: Scotland
- Genre: Gaelic music
- Years active: 1992-?
- Past members: Arthur Cormack; Blair Douglas; Alison Kinnaird; Eilidh Mackenzie; Christine Primrose

Mac-Talla (Scottish Gaelic for "echo") was a Scottish Gaelic "supergroup" formed in 1992 at the suggestion of record label owner Robin Morton. Morton credited the individual band members as some of those responsible for bringing Gaelic music to wider public attention.

The group comprised three singers: Eilidh Mackenzie, a recipient of the An Comunn Gàidhealach Gold Medal, Christine Primrose, and Arthur Cormack; plus harpist and cellist Alison Kinnaird (also Morton's spouse), described by the Saltire Society in 2015 as one of Scotland's "most influential musicians" and keyboardist Blair Douglas, formerly of Runrig.

The band was described by the Scottish Traditional Music Hall of Fame, and by The Rough Guide to World Music: Africa, Europe and the Middle East, as a "Gaelic supergroup". Q Magazine also called them a "supergroup".

Their only album, Mairidh Gaol is Ceòl (there is a Gaelic proverb, Thig crìoch air an t-saoghal / Ach mairidh gaol is ceòl, "The world will come to an end / But love and music will endure"), was released in 1994 by Morton's Temple Records. In reviewing the album, Scotland on Sunday said "This has to be THE Gaelic showcase outfit for the 1990s". Rough Guide: Scottish Highlands and Islands described the album as featuring "glorious harmony and solo singing, accordion and harp".
