= Threads (Battlefield Band album) =

Studio album by The Battlefield Band
- Released: 14 November 1995
- Genre: Celtic
- Length: 52:45
- Label: Temple
- Producer: Robin Morton

The Battlefield Band chronology
| Opening Moves | Threads | Across the Borders |

Professional ratings
Review scores
| Source | Rating |
|---|---|
| Allmusic | link |

Threads is the nineteenth album by Battlefield Band and their thirteenth studio album, released in 1995 on the Temple Records label.

== Track listing ==
1. "In and out of the Harbour/The Top Tier/Sleepy Maggie/Molly Rankin" – 3:37
2. "The Arran Convict" – 4:26
3. "Snow on the Hills/Xesus and Felisa" – 3:17
4. "Tramps and Hawkers" – 5:47
5. "My Home Town/Kalabakan" – 3:43
6. "The Weary Whaling Ground" – 4:10
7. "Miss Kate Rusby" – 3:57
8. "The Same Old Story" – 4:45
9. "Simon Thoumire's Jig/Shake a Leg/Ríl Gan Ainm" – 3:56
10. "MacPherson's Lament" – 5:23
11. "Tam Bain's Lum/The Price of the Pig/Isabelle Blackley" – 4:52
12. "The Indian Lass" – 4:52

== Personnel ==
=== Battlefield Band ===
- Alan Reid
- Iain MacDonald
- Alistair Russel
- John McCusker

== Sources and links ==
- Threads at AllMusic
