= Room Enough for All =

Room Enough For All

Studio album by Battlefield Band
- Released: 19 March 2013 in the United States & Canada; 8 April 2013 worldwide.
- Recorded: Temple Records Studio, Scotland
- Genre: Celtic music
- Length: 43:23
- Label: Temple

Battlefield Band chronology
| Line-up (2011) | Room Enough For All (2013) | Beg & Borrow (2015) |

Professional ratings
Review scores
| Source | Rating |
|---|---|
| Allmusic | |

Room Enough For All is the thirty-first album by Battlefield Band and their twenty-third studio album, released on the Temple Records label by mid-March 2013 in the USA & Canada in CD (to coincide with the band's tour) and in early April 2013 worldwide in CD & Digital Download formats.

== Overview ==
Room Enough For All is Battlefield Band's second studio album to be recorded by the band's new line-up since the last remaining founding member Alan Reid's definitive departure at the end of 2010.

== Critical reception ==
Room Enough For All was awarded "Album of the Year" at the 2013 MG Alba Scots Trad Music Awards.

== Track listing ==
1. "Bagpipe Music" 3:33
2. "Major George Morrison DSO..." 4:31
3. "Farewell To Indiana" 3:53
4. "The Garron Trotting..." 4:53
5. "Nic Coiseam" 4:08
6. "The Hairy Angler Fish..." 3:49
7. "Ceann Loch an Duin..." 4:22
8. "Duanag an t-Seòladair" 4:05
9. "The Eight Men of Moidart..." 3:06
10. "In Contempt" 3:37
11. "Tynes In Overtime!" 3:24

== Personnel ==
=== Battlefield Band ===
- Sean O'Donnell - vocals & guitar
- Alasdair White - fiddle, whistle, tenor guitar
- Ewen Henderson - fiddle, vocals Highland bagpipes, small pipes, whistle, piano
- Mike Katz - Highland bagpipes, bouzouki, small pipes, whistle, bass guitar, tenor guitar, guitar

=== Guests ===
- Mike Whellans - Moothie / Harmonica
