= Thread =

Thread or Threads may refer to:

== Objects ==
- Thread (textiles)
  - Thread (unit of measurement), a cotton yarn measure
- Screw thread, a helical ridge on a cylindrical fastener
- Thread, an individual strand of spider silk

== Arts and entertainment ==
- Thread (film), 2016 Greek film
- Threads (1932 film), directed by G. B. Samuelson
- Threads (1984 film), apocalyptic nuclear war drama film
- Threads (2017 film), animated short film
- Threads: Our Tapestry of Love, a 2020 film by Takahisa Zeze
- "Threads" (Stargate SG-1), a Stargate SG-1 episode
- "Thread", a poem by Patti Smith from Babel
- Thread, a lethal spore in the Dragonriders of Pern universe
- The Thread, Indian National Film Award for Best Non-Feature Animation Film winner
- Project Runway: Threads, spinoff television series with child contestants

=== Music ===
- Thread (album), by rock band Red Sun Rising
- Threads (Battlefield Band album)
- Threads (David S. Ware album)
- Threads (Now, Now album)
- Threads (Temposhark album)
- Threads (Sheryl Crow album)
- "Threads" (song), by avant-rock band This Will Destroy You
- Thread, album by Wideawake
- Threads, album by the Verve Pipe
- Threads, extended play by Sarah Harding, and its title track
- "Thread", a 1992 song by Miyuki Nakajima from East Asia

== Technology ==
- Threads (social network)
- Conversation threading
- Thread (computing)
- Thread (network protocol), a home automation protocol

== Other uses ==
- Thread (non-profit organization), in Baltimore City, US
- Ariadne's thread (logic), a method for solving a problem

== See also ==
- Threading (disambiguation)
