= Out for the Night =

Studio album by The Battlefield Band
- Released: 24 February 2004
- Genre: Celtic
- Length: 70:34
- Label: Temple
- Producer: Robin Morton

The Battlefield Band chronology
Time and Tide	Out for the Night	The Road of Tears

Professional ratings
Review scores
Source	Rating
Allmusic	4/5 stars

Out for the Night, an album by The Battlefield Band, was released in 2004 on the Temple Records label.

== Track listing ==
1. "Ms. Dynamite of Benbecula/The Alewife T/Little Cascade/Culder's Rant" – 4:39
2. "The Earl of Errol" – 4:11
3. "Christ Church/Nuala Kennedy's Reel/Ambassador Craig Murray's Reel" – 4:25
4. "Seudan a' Chuain (Jewels of the Ocean/The Grinder/Barbhas Agus Butthea" – 4:59
5. "Belfast to Boston" – 6:03
6. "The Anniversary Reel/Out for the Night" – 4:11
7. "Rest and Be Thankful" – 3:43
8. "The King's Shilling" – 3:41
9. "An Cota Ruadh (The Red Coat)/Eastwood Cottage/Clisham/Captain Forbes' Reel/Keep the Country Bonnie Lassie" – 4:12
10. "Bagad Kemper/Trouble at Baghdad Roundabout/McKenna's Jig" – 5:15
11. "The Banks O' Carron Water" – 3:47
12. "Bowmore Fair/Mary O'Neill's Reel/Tournemine et Gasdebois" – 4:04
13. "Clan Coco/The Road to Benderloch/Fifteen Stubbies to Warragul" – 5:01
14. "Lord Randall" – 5:09
15. "Time & Tide/The Nine Pint Coggie/Drive Home the Mainlanders/The Mill House" – 7:14

== Sources and links ==
- Out for the Night at AllMusic
- Album page from the band’s website
