= Leaving Friday Harbor =

Studio album by The Battlefield Band
- Released: 28 September 1999
- Genre: Celtic
- Label: Temple

The Battlefield Band chronology
| Rain, Hail or Shine (1998) | Leaving Friday Harbor (1999) | Happy Daze (2001) |

Professional ratings
Review scores
| Source | Rating |
|---|---|
| Allmusic | link |

Leaving Friday Harbor, an album by The Battlefield Band, was released in 1999 on the Temple Records label.

== Track listing ==
1. Clan Coco/The Road to Benderloch/Fifteen Stubbies to Warragul - 3:49
2. The Last Trip Home - 4:59
3. It's Nice to be Nice/The Auld Toon Band/McCabe's Reel - 4:26
4. The Straw Man - 4:51
5. Leaving Friday Harbor - 5:16
6. The 24th Guards Brigade at Anzio/The Melbourne Sleeper/McRae's of Linnie - 3:55
7. One More Chorus - 4:49
8. The Pleasure Will be Mine - 4:04
9. Something for Jamie - 3:35
10. The Sister's Reel/Marion & Donald/The Lassie with the Yellow Petticoat/Jesse "The Body" Ventura's Reel - 3:46
11. Logie O' Buchan - 5:53

== Personnel ==
=== Battlefield Band ===
- Alan Reid (keyboards, guitar, vocals, writing)
- Davy Steele (lead vocals, writing)
- John McCusker (fiddle, whistle)
- Mike Katz (Highland pipes, small pipes, various whistles)

== Sources and links ==
- Leaving Friday Harbor at AllMusic
