= Beg & Borrow =

Studio album by Battlefield Band
- Released: 21 August 2015 (digital download and streaming) 18 September 2015 in the UK (CD) 16 October 2015 in the United States (CD)
- Recorded: Temple Records Studio, Scotland
- Genre: Celtic music
- Length: 70:54
- Label: Temple Records; Catalogue Number: COMD 2107 (CD) DD 2107 (Download)
- Producer: Robin Morton

Battlefield Band chronology
Room Enough For All (2013)	Beg & Borrow (2015)

Professional ratings
Review scores
Source	Rating
The Green Man Review	very favourable
The Scotsman	4/5 stars
Folk Radio UK	very favourable
Trad' Mag	3/5 stars

Beg & Borrow is the thirty-second album by Battlefield Band (with special guests) and their twenty-fourth studio album, released on the Temple Records label as a digital download (and on streaming) on 21 August 2015 and on CD in the UK on 18 September 2015 and in the United States on 16 October 2015.

== Overview ==
On 1 January 2015, Battlefield Band revealed in an e-mail to their fanbase that, back from their US tour in October/November 2014, they were working hard in the studio on a new recording project with the working title Beg, Borrow & Steal. The Irish / Scottish album would highlight and explore the cultural cross-fertilisation of the vibrant musical traditions of Scotland & Ireland and the group would collaborate with many other leading traditional musicians and scholars. Mick Moloney (USA/Ireland), Nuala Kennedy (Ireland), Aaron Jones (Ireland), Christine Primrose (Scotland), Alison Kinnaird (Scotland) & Barry Gray (Australia) were due to be all on board, with more to follow. The band has been awarded Creative Scotland assistance for this project. If all would have gone well as initially announced and expected, the recordings would have been available on Temple Records by March 2015 - it might even have turned into a tour if all would have gone well and the musicians would have been available. In Summer 2015, not a single news had surfaced about the new album project.

On 22 June 2015, on their Twitter page, Battlefield Band announced a January 2016 (11-date) tour of Germany, Switzerland and Austria due to begin on 14 January in Offenburg, Germany and end on 31 January 2016 in Hamburg, Germany. This would be Battlefield Band's return to the stage after more than a year of inactivity for the band had not tour during the whole year 2015...

On 14 August 2015, Battlefield Band's label Temple Records finally announced that the new album had been re-titled simply as "Beg & Borrow" and would be released as a digital download (and on streaming) on 21 August 2015, on CD in the UK on 18 September 2015 and on CD in the United States on 16 October 2015.

Battlefield Band later confirmed that they would embark on 14 January 2016 on a 16-date tour of German-speaking countries (Germany, German-speaking Switzerland, Austria) including a radio show and a TV show in Germany, due to end on 31 January 2016.

Beg & Borrow is Battlefield Band's third studio album to be recorded by the band's new line-up since the last remaining founding member Alan Reid's definitive departure at the end of 2010 and their first one without recent comer Ewen Henderson since his departure from the band during 2014.

== Critical reception ==
On 5 October 2015, The Green Man Review stated: «...[Battlefield Band is] still a driving force in Scottish music... [Beg & Borrow is] a rich record in every aspect», paying the band (and their guests) compliments: «full marks to everyone involved.»

On 28 November 2015, Beg & Borrow received a four star album review (out of 5) from The Scotsman's music critic Jim Gilchrist, stating: «The Battlefield Band, currently reduced to a trio of fiddler Alasdair Whyte, piper Mike Katz and guitarist-singer Sean O'Donnell, bulk up by recruiting a host of guests from Scotland, Ireland and beyond for a lively spree. There are the expected jigs and reels aplenty, as well as engaging contributions from guests [...] but the vital core of it all remains White, Katz and O'Donnell in full flight.»

On 8 December 2015, Beg & Borrow received a warm review from the Folk Radio UK's music critic Johnny Whalley, calling it a «bouncing baby of an album» and stating: «The variety of styles and instrumentation that the guest artists have contributed results in an album of far greater scope than one might expect.», adding: «Beg and Borrow by no means has the feel of a compilation album, the care and attention given to researching, performing and explaining the material ensures that the underlying theme is always, and pleasurably, apparent.» and «The whole album, music and text, is an education of the best possible sort, packed with great music and enough background information to satisfy your immediate needs.»

In the January–February 2016 issue of (French magazine) Trad' Mag, Beg & Borrow received a three star review (out of 5) from folk critic Philippe Cousin, stating: «Being the oldest band from the Scottish music scene, Battlefield Band is crowned with forty-seven years of activity and more than thirty albums. In 2015, the band is back with Beg & Borrow, an album which combines two cultures with brio. The first word that comes to mind here is "wealth". A musical wealth celebrated in twelve instrumental tracks and six wonderful songs. In almost fifty years of existence, no less than twenty musicians joined the band. However, they have kept a distinctive sound, instantly recognizable.»

== Track listing ==
1. "Reels: The Five Mile Chase / The Cameronian Reel / The Black Haired Lass / Miss Girdle" (feat. Leo McCann) - 3:44
2. "6/8's: Drunken Man's Frolic / We Will Go Merrily Sailing / Charlie Over the Water" - 3:41
3. "Song: The Blantyre Explosion" (feat. Christine Primrose) - 3:41
4. "Slow Air & Jig: The Glasgow Lasses / The Scottish Lovers" (feat. Leo McCann) - 4:07
5. "Strathspey/Reels: The Braes of Mar / Pottingers / The Baker" (feat. John Martin) - 3:35
6. "Scots Gaelic Song: An Gille Mear (My Gallant Lad)" (feat. Christine Primrose & Nuala Kennedy) - 4:38
7. "Strathspey & Reels: Sporan Dhomhnaill / Mist on the Glen (The Devils of Dublin) / Miss Monaghan" (feat. Nuala Kennedy) - 4:39
8. "Strathspeys & Reels: Chief Inspector Rod Parker / This Is How the Ladies Dance / Come to the Shealing / Dandy Denny Cronin" (feat. Barry Gray & John Martin) - 3:34
9. "Song: One Night in My Youth" (feat. Aaron Jones) - 2:39
10. "March & Reel: McCarthy's Quickstep / The Drunken Piper" (feat. Mike Whellans) - 3:29
11. "Hornpipe, Jig & Hornpipe: Fingal's Weeping (Fingal's Cave) / Caberfeidh / Gillespie's Hornpipe (The HLI Hornpipe)" (feat. Jim Kilpatrick) - 4:04
12. "Irish Gaelic Song: Mo Bhuachaill Dubh Dhonn (My Brown Haired Boy)" (feat. Nuala Kennedy, Christine Primrose & Alison Kinnaird) - 3:51
13. "Slow Air: Ellen's Dreams" (feat. Alison Kinnaird) - 2:54
14. "March, Strathspey & Reels: Captain Grant / The Islay Ball / Donal Odhar / An Ceile a bh' aig Iain MacEoin" - 4:24
15. "Song: Blooming Caroline from Edinburgh Town" - 5:25
16. "Fling & Reels: The Whole Chicken in the Soup / Largo's Fairy Dance / The Kerryman's Daughter" (feat. Don Meade, Tony Demarco & Robin Morton) - 3:26
17. "Highlands: The Lass of Killiecrankie / The Ladies of Gormand / Untitled Highland / The Teelin Highland" (feat. Leo McCann & John Martin) - 3:16
18. "Song: The Mickey Dam / The Haughs o' Cromdale / The Glasgow Hornpipe" (feat. Mike Whellans & Robin Morton) - 4:20

== Personnel ==
=== Battlefield Band ===
- Sean O'Donnell - guitar, vocals
- Alasdair White - fiddle, whistle, bouzouki & vocals
- Mike Katz - Highland and small pipes, whistles, bass guitar, guitar & vocals

=== Guests ===
- Christine Primrose (Scotland) - Gaelic Song
- Alison Kinnaird (Scotland) - Scottish Harp & Cello
- Jim Kilpatrick (Scotland) - Snare & Bass Drums
- John Martin (Scotland) - Fiddle
- Mike Whellans (Scotland) - Harmonica / Moothie
- Nuala Kennedy (Ireland) - Gaelic Song & Flute
- Leo McCann (Ireland) - Melodeon
- Aaron Jones (Ireland) - Vocals & Bouzouki
- Barry Gray (Australia) - Highland Bagpipe
- Robin Morton (Ireland) - Vocals, Bodhran
- Don Meade (USA) - Harmonica
- Tony DeMarco (USA) - Fiddle

=== Credits ===
- Produced by Robin Morton.
- Recorded & mixed at Temple Records by Robin Morton and Ewan MacGregor.
- Barry Gray recorded by George Fahd at Go-To, Sydney.
- Don Meade & Tony Demarco recorded by Tim Mitchell at Kaleidoscope Sound, Union City, NJ.
- Sleeve Designed by John Slavin.
