= Quiet Days =

Studio album by The Battlefield Band
- Released: 1992
- Genre: Celtic
- Length: 51:37
- Label: Temple
- Producer: Robin Morton

The Battlefield Band chronology
New Spring	Quiet Days	Opening Moves

Quiet Days is a studio album by Battlefield Band released in 1992 on the Temple Records label.

== Reception ==
Professional ratings
Review scores
Source	Rating
Allmusic	2.5/5 stars

== Track listing ==
1. "Captain Lachlan MacPhail of Tiree/Peter MacKinnon of Skeabost/The Blackberry Bush" – 3:23
2. "The River" – 4:37
3. "Dalnabreac/The Bishop's Son/Miss Sharon McCusker" – 3:50
4. "From Here to There/Jack Broke the Prison Door/Toss The Feathers/The Easy Club Reel" – 4:05
5. "The St. Louis Stagger/The Ass in the Graveyard/Sandy's New Chanter" – 4:20
6. "Captain Campbell/Stranger at the Gate/John Keith Laing" – 3:04
7. "Hold Back the Tide" – 3:37
8. "BLISTERED FINGERS: The Cumbernauld Perennials/The Keep Left Sign/Taking The Soup/Bonnie George Campbell/Mo Dhachaidh/The Loch Ness Monster" – 8:45
9. "Curstaidh's Farewell" – 4:13
10. "The Hoodie Craw" – 3:35
11. "Col. MacLean of Ardgour/Pipe Major Jimmy MacGregor/Rocking The Baby" – 4:30
12. "How Will I Ever Be Simple Again?/Dawn Song" – 3:38

== Sources and links ==
- Quiet Days at AllMusic
