= King of Rome (disambiguation) =

The King of Rome was the ancient monarch of the Roman Kingdom

- King of the Romans, the medieval title under the Holy Roman Empire
- Napoleon II, King of Rome, Napoleon I's son and heir
- The King of Rome, racing pigeon 1913, and the song about it
- "King of Rome", an album by Judicator (band), 2012
- "King of Rome", The Unthanks with Brighouse and Rastrick Brass Band
- "King of Rome", from Yes (Pet Shop Boys album)
