= Earl of Erroll (disambiguation) =

Earl of Erroll (also spelled Errol) is a title in the Peerage of Scotland. It may refer to:

- Earl of Erroll, 24 peers who have carried this title
  - See 24 individual articles
- Earl of Erroll, a separate title in the Baronage of Scotland
- The Earl of Errol (ballad), a Child Ballad
- Earl of Erroll (reel), Scottish dances
