= Roman king =

Roman king may refer to:

- the King of Rome, the holder of supreme authority in the Roman Kingdom from 753 BC until 509 BC
- the King of the Romans, a title in the Holy Roman Empire, adopted since 1056 AD
- The King of Rome, a successful racing pigeon; also a song of the same name about the bird

See also

- Early Roman Kings, a song written by American singer-songwriter Bob Dylan and released on his album Tempest in 2012.
