= Brian McNeill =

Scottish musician (born 1950)

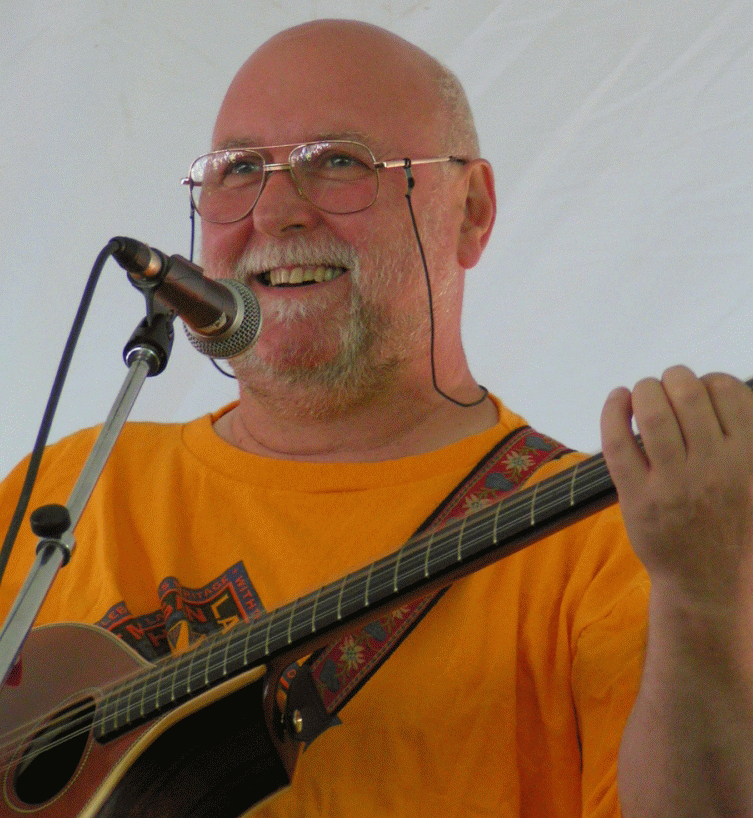
- McNeill performing in August 2006

Background information
- Born: 6 April 1950 (age 76); Falkirk, Scotland
- Genre: Folk rock
- Occupations: Musician, singer, songwriter, record producer
- Instruments: Violin, guitar, viola, mandolin, bouzouki, cittern, concertina, hurdy-gurdy
- Years active: 1969–present
- Website: Official website

Brian McNeill (born 6 April 1950, Falkirk, Scotland) is a Scottish folk multi-instrumentalist, songwriter, record producer and musical director. He was a founding member of Battlefield Band which combined traditional Celtic melodies and new material.

== Biography ==
McNeill learnt music on the violin before taking up other instruments including guitar, fiddle, viola, mandolin, bouzouki, cittern, concertina, and hurdy-gurdy, as well as singing. He played fiddle with Battlefield Band from its formation in 1969 until 1990. In 1987, he won the UK National Songsearch competition for amateur and professional performers, having been runner-up in 1986.

From 1996 until January 2008, McNeill was head of the traditional music course at the Royal Scottish Academy of Music and Drama, Glasgow.

As a novelist he has published three books, The Busker (1989), To Answer the Peacock (1999), and In the Grass. He has also produced an acclaimed audio-visual show about Scottish emigration to America, The Back o' the North Wind.

Apart from his visible contributions, McNeill is influential in Scotland and abroad as a producer. He has many production credits in the UK and North America including "Emigrant and Exile" for Eric Bogle with John Munro.

McNeill's songs often feature lyrics based on Scottish historical themes, and he continually has celebrated the culture of his fellow Scots, including those who have emigrated to North America. His album The Back o' the North Wind features songs about industrialist Andrew Carnegie and the man who initiated the conservation movement in the United States, John Muir.

Brian McNeill won the inaugural Fatea Lifetime Achievement award in 2007 and was the producer of 2017's instrumental album of the year, "Matt Tighe", the eponymous debut album of the young English fiddler that Brian had inspired at one of his many Cambridge Folk Festival appearances.

== Books ==
- The Busker, Macdonald, 1989, ISBN 0-356-17943-5
- To Answer The Peacock, Black Ace Books, 1999, ISBN 1-872988-32-6
- In the Grass, Author House, 2012, ISBN 9781467884594

== Discography ==
=== With Battlefield Band ===
- 1976 [#01] Farewell to Nova Scotia debut studio album (first released on Escalibur label as Scottish Folk)
- 1977 [#02] Battlefield Band studio album #02 (first released on Topic label)
- 1978 [#03] Wae's me for Prince Charlie studio album #03 (first released on Escalibur label)
- 1978 [#04] At the Front studio album #04 (first released on Topic label)
- 1979 [#05] Stand Easy studio album #05 (first released on Topic label; reissued as Stand Easy/Preview in 1980)
- 1980 [#06] Home Is Where the Van Is studio album #06
- 1982 [#07] The Story So Far 1977-1980 compilation album #1 of the 3 first studios albums released on Topic label
- 1982 [#08] There's a Buzz studio album #07
- 1984 [#09] Anthem for the Common Man studio album #08
- 1986 [#10] Music in Trust Vol 1 Soundtrack album #01
- 1986 [#11] On the Rise studio album #09
- 1987 [#12] After Hours: Forward to Scotland's Past compilation album #2 of the five last previous albums
- 1987 [#13] Celtic Hotel studio album #10
- 1988 [#14] Music in Trust Vol 2 Soundtrack album #02
- 1989 [#15] Home Ground – Live From Scotland live album #1 (recorded live in Aberdeen, Scotland during the group's Scottish tour in Spring 1989)
- 1998 [#00] Live Celtic Folk Music (live recording of a concert at the 1980 Winterfolkfestival, held in Dordrecht, Netherlands; released only on a foreign label)

=== Solo albums ===
- 1978 Monksgate
- 1985 Unstrung Hero
- 1985 The Busker and the Devil's Only daughter
- 1991 The Back O' The North Wind (Greentrax Recordings)
- 1994 Horses for Courses (with Tom McDonagh)
- 1995 No Gods (Greentrax Recordings)
- 1995 Stage By Stage (with Iain MacKintosh)
- 1999 To Answer the Peacock (Greentrax Recordings)
- 2000 Live and Kicking (with Iain MacKintosh; includes "The King of Rome")
- 2009 The Baltic tae Byzantium (Greentrax Recordings)
- 2010 The Crew o' the Copenhagen (with Drones & Bellows)
- 2015 The Falkirk Music Pot (Greentrax Recordings) (featured as "Brian McNeill & Friends celebrate his home town's music") (22-track double album)
