= Battlefield Band =

Scottish traditional music group (1969–2017)

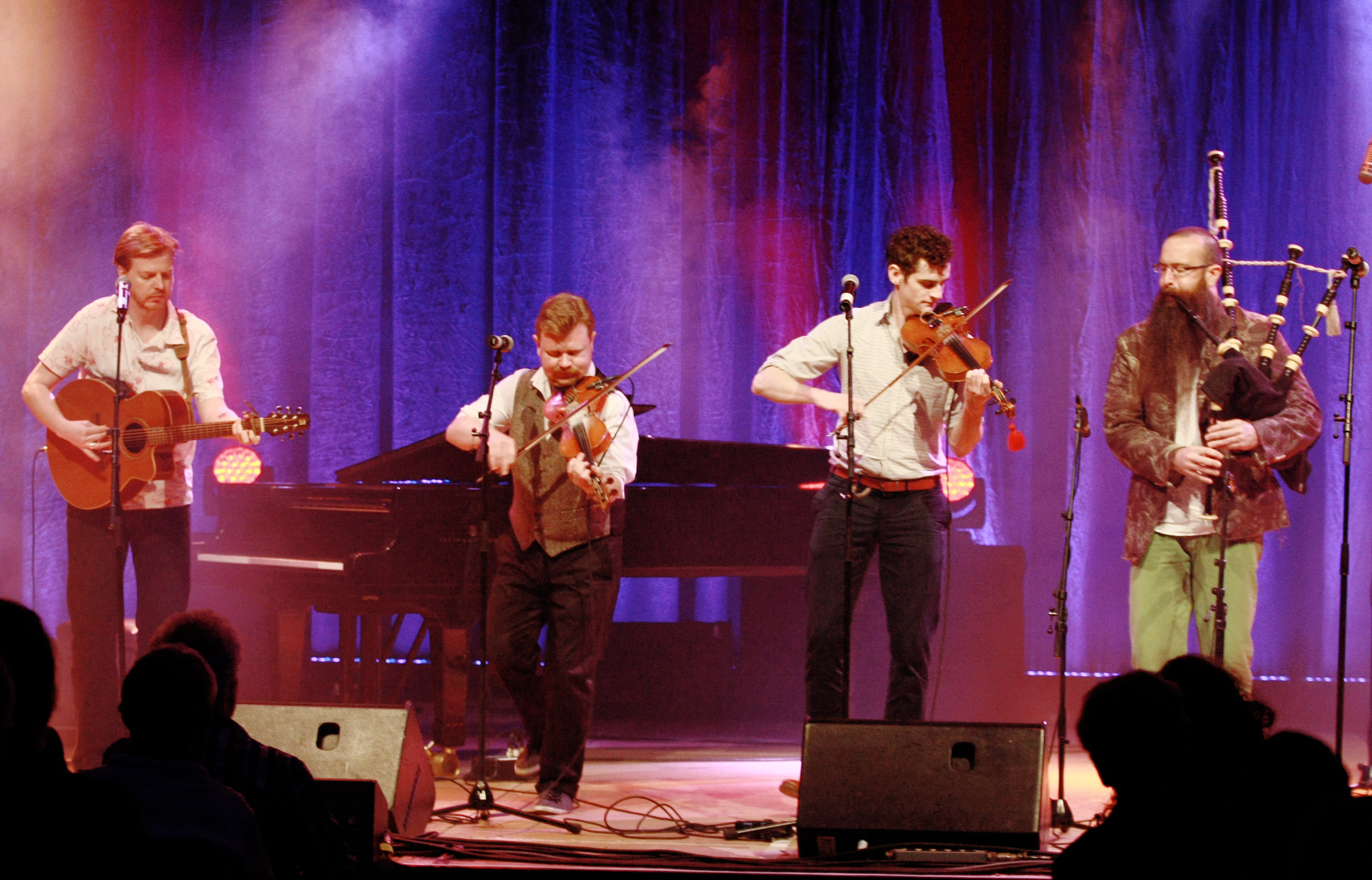
- The band performing in Freiburg in 2012

Background information
- Origin: Glasgow, Scotland
- Genre: Scottish traditional music
- Years active: 1969–2017
- Labels: Temple, Escalibur, Topic
- Past members: Sean O'Donnell Alasdair White Mike Katz (as their final line-up)

Battlefield Band was a Scottish traditional music group. Founded in Glasgow in 1969, they have released over 30 albums and undergone many changes of lineup. As of 2010, none of the original founders remain in the band. Their last known live performance occurred in August 2017.

The band is noted for their combination of bagpipes with non-traditional instruments, such as electronic keyboards, and for its mix of traditional songs and new material. Battlefield Band toured internationally, playing to audiences in Europe, Australia, Asia, the Middle East, and North America.

They have collaborated with other musicians including the Scottish harp player and glass sculptor Alison Kinnaird.

== History ==
=== Career ===
Battlefield Band was formed in 1969 by five student friends from Strathclyde University (Brian McNeill, Jim Thomson, Alan Reid, Eddie Morgan and Sandra Lang, who became crime fiction author Alex Gray) and took its name from the area in the south of Glasgow where McNeill was living at the time. After several line-up changes and an album recorded for a minor Breton label, the band was signed to Topic records and released its official self-titled debut in 1977 with the line-up of McNeill (fiddle, vocals), Reid (keyboards, vocals), Jamie McMenemy (bouzouki, vocals), and John Gahagan (whistle). Gahagan left before the recording of the follow-up, At the Front (1978), and was replaced by Irish singer-guitarist Pat Kilbride. The departure of both Kilbride and McMenemy shortly afterward brought in Jen Clark (vocals, cittern, dulcimer) and Duncan MacGillivray (Highland pipes) for Stand Easy (1979), thus beginning Battlefield Band's tradition of using bagpipes on their albums. Clark was replaced by Northumbrian singer-guitarist Ged Foley on Home is Where the Van Is (1980), which marked a switch from Topic records to producer Robin Morton's label Temple. Home is Where the Van Is also inaugurated the band's practice of placing original songs alongside traditional material. The line-up changes continued, though the group remained based around the core of McNeill and Reid until 1990, when McNeill left to pursue a solo career. Reid finally left the band at the end of 2010, concentrating on his musical duo with guitarist & singer Rob van Sante, the Battlefield Band's sound engineer.

=== Final years ===
On 1 January 2015, Battlefield Band revealed in an e-mail sent to their fanbase that, back from their US tour in October/November 2014, they were working hard in the studio on a new recording project with the working title Beg, Borrow & Steal. The Irish / Scottish album would highlight and explore the cultural cross-fertilisation of the vibrant musical traditions of Scotland & Ireland and the group would collaborate with many other leading traditional musicians and scholars. Mick Moloney (USA/Ireland), Nuala Kennedy (Ireland), Aaron Jones (Ireland), Christine Primrose (Scotland), Alison Kinnaird (Scotland) & Barry Gray (Australia) were due to be all on board, with more to follow. The band has been awarded Creative Scotland assistance for this project. If all would have gone well as initially announced and expected, the recordings would have been available on Temple Records by March 2015 – it might even have turned into a tour if all would have gone well and the musicians would have been available. (Note: ... as Battlefield Band explained in an e-mail sent to their fanbase on 1 January 2015.)

On 22 June 2015, on their Twitter page, Battlefield Band announced a January 2016 (11-date) tour of Germany, Switzerland and Austria due to begin on 14 January in Offenburg, Germany and end on 31 January 2016 in Hamburg, Germany. This would be Battlefield Band's return to the stage for the first time since November 2014 i.e. after more than a year of inactivity as the band had not toured during the whole year 2015...

On 14 August 2015, Battlefield Band's label Temple Records finally announced that the (delayed) new album had been re-titled simply as Beg & Borrow and would be released as a digital download (and on streaming) on 21 August 2015, on CD in the UK on 18 September 2015 and on CD in the United States on 16 October 2015.

Battlefield Band later confirmed that they would embark on 14 January 2016 on a 16-date tour of German-speaking countries (Germany, German-speaking Switzerland, Austria) including a radio show and a TV show in Germany, due to end on 31 January 2016.

After having performed an ultimate show on Sunday 13 August 2017 (7:30 p.m.) during the Scotland Piping Live! festival at The National Piping Centre in Glasgow, Scotland (as the festival closing concert), the band went dormant with no explanation whatsoever from the official web site.

== Accolades ==
Battlefield Band were winners of "Best Live Act" at the inaugural Scots Trad Music Awards in 2003. In 2011, they were winners of "Best Band" at the Scots Trad Music Awards 2011.

Battlefield Band's "Compliments to Buddy McMaster" (a track from its album Dookin' released in 2007) was nominated for the 7th Annual Independent Music Awards for World Traditional Song of the year. They also have been nominated for the 11th Independent Music Awards "World Traditional Song" category for its recording of "A' Bhriogais Uallach" ("The Pompous Trousers"), a track from their album Line-up released in 2011.

On 11 November 2016, Battlefield Band were inducted into Scottish Traditional Music Hall of Fame for "Services to Performance".

== Instruments and themes ==
Every line-up since the Stand Easy album has had at least one bagpiper. Unusual aspects of the instrumental line-up for a traditional band include the presence of electric keyboards and the absence of percussion. Every album mixes traditional Scottish songs and tunes with modern (often original) compositions. Themes range from drinking, friendship, and hard times to history, geography and politics.

The band's 2006 album, The Road of Tears, deals explicitly with the theme of displacement. Many of the songs deal with emigration, both voluntary and forced. Battlefield Band's 2007 album, Dookin′ (the Scots word for what you do at hallowe'en – as in "'dookin' for apples") has a lighter feel, after the eloquently somber tone of The Road of Tears. Dookin' includes instrumentals and a mix of vocals, with lead being shared by Alan Reid and Sean O'Donnell.

== Members ==
=== Final line-up ===
1. Sean O'Donnell [2005–2017] (vocals, guitar) – Sean replaced former Irish vocalist and guitarist Pat Kilbride in July 2005.
2. Alasdair White [2002–2017] (fiddle, whistles, banjo, bouzouki, Highland bagpipes, small pipes, bodhrán, cittern, mandolin)
3. Mike Katz [1998–2017] (Highland pipes, small pipes, various whistles, bass guitar, guitar, bouzouki)

=== Past members ===
1. Alan Reid [1969–2010] (founding member; keyboards, guitar, vocals, accordion, melodica, Hammond organ, writing) – Alan was the last remaining founding member of the band before he left at the end of 2010.
2. Brian McNeill [1969–1990] (founding member; fiddle, writing) – Brian has published two detective novels. In 2001, he took up the post of Head of Scottish Music at the Royal Scottish Academy of Music and Drama in Glasgow, which he has since relinquished.
3. Jim Thomson [1969-1973] (founding member, guitar, mandolin, tenor banjo, 5-string banjo, harmonica, tin whistle, vocals).
4. Eddie Morgan [1969-1973] (founding member, guitar).
5. Sandra Lang [1969] (founding member).
6. Ricky Starrs [1973?–1976]; (guitar, mandolin, whistles) – Ricky played on the very first Battlefield Band album, the original Arfolk recording Scottish Folk (1976), later re-released (this very same year 1976) as Farewell to Nova Scotia on the Escalibur label.
7. Jamie McMenemy [1977–1978] (vocals, mandolin, banjo, fiddle, Irish flute) – Jamie is still a very active musician and co-founder of the Breton group Kornog. He now lives in Brittany.
8. John Gahagan [1977–1978] (fiddle, whistle) – John is now working as a graphic artist in Glasgow and continuing to play music.
9. Pat Kilbride [1978; 2002–2005] (vocals, guitar, cittern, bouzouki) – Pat lived in Brittany, Belgium, then the USA, has recorded with "The Kips Bay Ceilidh Band" and done solo albums.
10. Jen Clark [1979] (vocals, guitar, cittern and dulcimer) – Among other things, Jen is now running a psychotherapy practice and offering voicework in Edinburgh).
11. Duncan MacGillivray [1979–1983] (bagpipes) – Duncan has won many piping competitions, including the Gold Medal at the Northern Meeting in Inverness in 1997.
12. Sylvia Barnes [1980] (vocals, dulcimer, guitar, bodhrán) – Sylvia came to Battlefield Band via Scottish folk group Kentigern (formed in 1978).
13. Jim Barnes [1980] (cittern, guitar, vocals) – Jim came to Battlefield Band via Scottish folk group Kentigern. He died in 2004.
14. Ged Foley [1980–1983] (guitar, vocal, Northumbrian pipes) – Ged has recorded with the House Band, Patrick Street and Celtic Fiddle Festival.
15. Dougie Pincock [1984–1990] (bagpipes) – Dougie is now director of the National Centre of Excellence in Traditional Music (Sgoil Chiùil na Gàidhealtachd) in Plockton.
16. Alistair Russell [1984–1997] (guitar, vocal) – During his 13 years in the band, Alistair claims to have travelled one million miles. He currently has a solo career.
17. John McCusker [1990–2001] (fiddle, whistle, accordion, cittern) – John replaced Brian McNeill.
18. Iain MacDonald [1991–1997] (bagpipes) – Iain was the musician in residence at the Gaelic College on the Isle of Skye.
19. Davy Steele (1948–2001) [1998-2000] (lead vocals, guitar, bouzouki, bodhrán, writing) – Before joining Battlefield Band, Davy sang with Drinkers Drouth, Ceolbeg and Clan Alba as well as making solo albums.
20. Karine Polwart [2001-2002] (lead vocals, guitar)
21. Ewen Henderson [2011–2014] (fiddle, Highland pipes, whistles, piano, vocals) – At the time he joined Battlefield Band (2011), Ewen was the youngest member. He left the band during 2014.

=== Guests on album ===
1. Alison Kinnaird [1985; 1995–1996; 2001; 2015] (cello, Scottish harp)
2. James MacKintosh [1995] (percussion)
3. Quee MacArthur [1995] (bass)
4. Kate Rusby [1996] (guitar, vocals)
5. Seamus Tansey [1996] (Irish flute)
6. Eric Rigler [1996] (Uilleann pipes)
7. The Radio Sweethearts [1996]
8. Donald Hay [1999; 2001] (percussion)
9. Kris Drever [2001] (upright bass)
10. Simon Thoumire [2001] (concertina)
11. Mike Whellans [2007; 2011; 2013; 2015] (harmonica, moothie)
12. Mitch Greenhill [2007] (guitar)
13. Allan MacDonald [2009] (vocals, small pipes)
14. Christine Primrose [2015] (Gaelic song)
15. Jim Kilpatrick [2015] (snare, bass drums)
16. John Martin [2015] (fiddle)
17. Nuala Kennedy [2015] (Gaelic song, flute)
18. Leo McCann [2015] (melodeon)
19. Aaron Jones [2015] (vocals, bouzouki)
20. Barry Gray [2015] (Highland bagpipe)
21. Robin Morton [2015] (vocals, bodhrán)
22. Don Meade [2015] (harmonica)
23. Tony DeMarco [2015] (fiddle)

=== Guests on stage ===
1. Kieran Munnelly (bodhrán, flute, vocals) – Irish musician leaving in Dublin, Ireland. Founding member of the Irish music band Hot Spoons (formed in 2009). He toured with Battlefield on the January/February 2016 tour of Germany, Austria & Switzerland.
2. Skip Healy (flute, piccolo) – Based in Switzerland. He often joined Battlefield for a guest appearance when they played at Parterre in Basel, Switzerland (as it happened during the show on 20 January 2016).

== Discography ==
=== Studio albums ===
- Farewell to Nova Scotia (1976) (Escalibur label) (first released on the Breton label Arfolk as Scottish Folk (1976))
- Battlefield Band (Topic label) (1977)
- Wae's me for Prince Charlie (Escalibur label) (1978)
- At the Front (Topic label) (1978)
- Stand Easy (Topic label (1979) (reissued as Stand Easy/Preview in 1980)
- Home Is Where the Van Is (1980)
- There's a Buzz (1982)
- Anthem for the Common Man (1984)
- On the Rise (1986)
- Celtic Hotel (Temple Records TP027) (1987)
- New Spring (1991)
- Quiet Days (1992)
- Threads (1995)
- Rain, Hail or Shine (1998)
- Leaving Friday Harbor (1999)
- Happy Daze (2001)
- Time and Tide (2002)
- Out for the Night (2004)
- The Road of Tears (2006)
- 'Dookin' (2007)
- Zama Zama... Try Your Luck (2009)
- Line-up (2011)
- Room Enough For All (2013)
- Beg & Borrow (2015)

=== Live albums ===
- Home Ground – Live From Scotland (1989)
- Across the Borders (1997)
- Live Celtic Folk Music (1998)

=== Soundtracks ===
- Music in Trust Vol 1 (1986)
- Music in Trust Vol 2 (1988)

=== Compilations ===
- The Story So Far 1977–1980 (1982)
- After Hours: Forward to Scotland's Past (1987)
- Opening Moves: Best Of 1977–79 (1993)
- Scottish Folk: The Rough Guide to Scottish Folk – (includes "Clan Coco / The Road to Benderloch / Fifteen Stubbies to Warragul" from the 1999 studio album Leaving Friday Harbor) (2002)
- The Best of Battlefield Band: A 25 Year Legacy 1977-2001 (2003)
- Three Score and Ten (2009)
- The Producer's Choice (2016)

=== Videography ===
- In Concert (At the Brunton Theatre, Musselburgh) (DVD) (2006 concert Brunton Theatre, Musselburgh, Scotland) (2008)
