= Live Celtic Folk Music =

Live album by The Battlefield Band
- Released: 3 February 1998
- Recorded: 13 December 1980 at the Winterfolkfestival in Dordrecht, The Netherlands
- Genre: Celtic
- Length: 34:37
- Label: Munich
- Producer: Ben Mattijssen

The Battlefield Band chronology
Across the Borders	Live Celtic Folk Music	Rain, Hail or Shine

Live Celtic Folk Music is a live album by Battlefield Band, released in 1998 on the Munich Records label. It was recorded in 1980 at the Winterfolkfestival, held in Dordrecht, The Netherlands.

== Track listing ==
1. "Lord Huntly's Cave/The Lady in the Bottle/Stewart Chisholm's Walkabout" – 5:26 (from Stand Easy/Preview 1980)
2. "The Gallant Grahams" – 3:08 (from Alan Reid & Brian McNeill's Sidetracks 1981)
3. "I Hae Laid a Herrin' in Salt/My Wife's a Wanton Wee Thing/The Banks of the Allan" – 3:34 (from Stand Easy/Preview 1980)
4. "Blackhall Rocks" – 2:54 (from Home Is Where the Van Is 1980)
5. "Athole Highlanders" – 2:46
6. "Miss Drummond of Perth/Fiddler's Joy/Traditional Reel/The Shetland Fiddler" – 3:10 (from Stand Easy 1979)
7. "The Lads O' the Fair" – 3:55 (from Home Is Where the Van Is 1980)
8. "74th Highlanders' Farewell to Edinburg/The Cup of Tea" – 4:08 (from Stand Easy/Preview 1980)
9. "Joe McGann's Fiddle/Center's Bonnet" – 5:46 (from Stand Easy/Preview 1980)

== Personnel ==
=== Battlefield Band ===
- Alan Reid
- Brian McNeill
- Duncan MacGillivray
- Ged Foley

== Sources and links ==
- Live Celtic Folk Music at AllMusic
