= Time and Tide (Battlefield Band album) =

Studio album by Battlefield Band
- Released: 24 September 2002
- Genre: Celtic
- Label: Temple

Battlefield Band chronology
Happy Daze	Time and Tide	Out for the Night

Professional ratings
Review scores
Source	Rating
Allmusic	3/5 stars

Time and Tide, an album by the Battlefield Band, was released in 2002 on the Temple Records label.

== Track listing ==
1. "Chuir I Gluin Air a Bhodach (She Put a Knee in the Old Man)/DJ MacLeod' " – 4:22
2. "Nancy's Whiskey" – 4:40
3. "If Cadillac Made Tractors.../Happy Birthday Fiona/MacFarlane's Rant" – 3:58
4. "Camden Town" – 3:26
5. "James Cameron/Fosgail an Doras (Open the Door)/The Skylark's Ascension" – 4:40
6. "Time and Tide" – 3:52
7. "The Bonny Jeannie Deans" – 4:08
8. "The Walking Nightmare/Drive Home the Mainlanders/The Mill House" – 3:17
9. "Rothesay Bay" – 3:37
10. "Banais Choinnich (Kenneth's Wedding)/Eileen MacDonald/Welcome the Piper" – 2:49
11. "Sunset" – 3:51
12. "Whiskey From the Field/Volcanic Organic" – 3:57
