= The Road of Tears =

Studio album by The Battlefield Band
- Released: 7 March 2006
- Genre: Celtic
- Label: Temple

The Battlefield Band chronology
Out for the Night	The Road of Tears	Dookin

Professional ratings
Review scores
Source	Rating
Allmusic	3/5 stars

The Road of Tears, an album by The Battlefield Band, was released in 2006 on the Temple Records label.

== Track listing ==
1. "The Road of Tears"
2. "Ely Parker/Miss Martin's Wedding/The Primrose Lassies/Mr. Galloway Goes to Washington"
3. "The Emigrant"
4. "The Highlander's Farewell to Ireland / Farewell to Ireland / Put Me in the Big Chest"
5. "The Slave's Lament"
6. "The Moleskin Kilt/The Empty Glen"
7. "Out in Australia at Last"
8. "The Patagonia Islanders / The Low Country Dance / Don Juan McKenna's Jig"
9. "Haro Strait"
10. "To a Mouse"
11. "Take Me to the Sea"
12. "Plane Wreck at Los Gatos"
13. "Sweet Molly / The Symmetry / The Boat Leaks"
14. "I Cried"
15. "Mary's Dream / The Mountain Dairy Maid / The Nameless Migrant"
16. "Five Bridges to Cross"
17. "The Green and the Blue"
