= Farewell to Nova Scotia (album) =

Studio album by The Battlefield Band
- Released: 1976
- Genre: Celtic
- Length: 49:14
- Label: Arfolk SB 349 Escalibur BUR 806

The Battlefield Band chronology
Farewell to Nova Scotia (1976)	Battlefield Band (1977)

Farewell to Nova Scotia is Battlefield Band's debut (studio) album. It was first released on LP in 1976 on the Breton label Arfolk as Scottish Folk and on the Escalibur label as Volume I - Farewell to Nova Scotia. The album is named after the title song "Farewell to Nova Scotia".

== History ==
High on the wing of success at Lorient festival 1975, the band entered a Breton recording studio and released this rare album featuring for the first and last time Ricky Starrs.

Volume I - Farewell to Nova Scotia is predating their first Topic album (released on LP in 1977 as Battlefield Band) and is followed by Volume II - Wae's me for Prince Charlie released on LP in 1978 on the Escalibur label as their second and last studio album on this label.

The three studio albums that follow on the Topic label - Battlefield Band (1977), At The Front (1978) and Stand Easy (1979) - would be pretty much in the same vein.

Battlefield Band is a trio made up of the founder members Alan Reid, Brian McNeill and string player Ricky Starrs. Alan Reid on vocals does the singing in much of the songs. Most of the music (7 songs, 5 instrumentals) is Scottish, but there is still Irish, Canadian, English and Australian influences here. Ricky Starrs would later be replaced by singer/bouzouki player Jamie McMenamy and whistle player John Gahagan, making Battlefield Band a quartet...

== Track listing ==
Side A : 24:31

1. "Richemond / Le Reel du Pendu" (trad.) 2.37
2. "Farewell to Nova Scotia" (trad.) 4.23
3. "Denis Murphy's Slide" (trad.) 2.38
4. "The Bonny Whaling Laddie" (trad.) 5.21
5. "The Bonny Wee Lassie Who Never Said No" (trad.) 3.19
6. "Pipe Tunes Medley" (trad.) 6.13

Side B : 24:43

1. "The Rybuck Shearer / Drops of Brandy" (trad.) 4.48
2. "The Fourposter Bed / Staten Island / Colonel Rodney" (trad.) 3.14
3. "The Back O'Benachie" (trad.) 5.14
4. "Revie's Reel / Mary McMahon" (trad.) 2.56
5. "The Forfar Sodger" (trad.) 2.46
6. "Paddy's Green Shamrock Shore" (trad.) 5.45

All the tracks: "Traditional - Arrangements by Battlefield Band"

== Personnel ==
=== Battlefield Band ===
- Brian McNeill: fiddle, vocals
- Alan Reid: keyboards, vocals
- Ricky Starrs: guitar, mandolin, vocals

=== Credits ===
- Recording engineer: Willy Wenger
