= Aqaba (album) =

Studio album by June Tabor
- Released: 1988
- Label: Topic
- Producer: Andrew Cronshaw

June Tabor chronology
The Peel Sessions (1986)	Aqaba (1988)	Some Other Time (1989)

Professional ratings
Review scores
Source	Rating
Allmusic	3/5 stars

Aqaba is a folk album by June Tabor released in 1988 on Topic Records, catalogue number TSCD 449.

The album was produced and engineered by Andrew Cronshaw at Ideal Sound Recorders, London.

Notable for its spare, almost minimalist arrangements, the album includes a mixture of traditional and non-traditional songs, in particular two from Tabor favourite Bill Caddick.

The accompanying book to the Topic Records 70 year anniversary boxed set Three Score and Ten lists this album as one of its classic albums.

== Track listing ==
1. "The Old Man's Song (Don Quixote)" (Bill Caddick, John Tams)
2. "Searching for Lambs" (Traditional; arranged Tabor)
3. "The Banks of Red Roses" (Traditional; arranged Tabor, Ric Sanders)
4. "Where Are You Tonight, I Wonder?" (Andy M. Stewart)
5. "Aqaba" (Bill Caddick)
6. "Bogie's Bonnie Belle" (Traditional; arranged Tabor)
7. "The Reaper" (Traditional; arranged Tabor)
8. "Verdi Cries" (Natalie Merchant)
9. "The Grazier's Daughter" (Traditional; arranged Tabor)
10. "Seven Summers" (Dave Goulder)
11. "Mayn Rue Plats" (Traditional; arranged Tabor, Ric Sanders)
12. "The King Of Rome" (Dave Sudbury)

== Personnel ==
- June Tabor - vocals
- Huw Warren - piano
- Ric Sanders - violin
- Martin Simpson - guitar
- Dave Bristow - synthesizer
- Ian Blake - bass clarinet
