= After Hours: Forward to Scotland's Past =

After Hours

Compilation album by The Battlefield Band
- Released: 1987
- Genre: Celtic
- Label: Temple

The Battlefield Band chronology
On the Rise (1986)	After Hours (1987)	Celtic Hotel (1987)

Professional ratings
Review scores
Source	Rating
Allmusic	3.5/5 stars

After Hours: Forward to Scotland's Past is the second compilation released by The Battlefield Band. It was released in 1987 on the Temple Records label.

== Track listing ==
1. "After Hours/The Green Gates/The Ship in Full Sail" – 3:30
2. "Frideray" – 2:54
3. "A Chance as Good as Any/Reid's Rant" – 3:19
4. "Anthem" – 3:28
5. "The Dear Green Place" – 4:46
6. "Look Across the Water/Mrs. Garden of the Troup/The Keelman Ower Land" – 4:26
7. "Green Plaid" – 3:46
8. "Mary Cassidy" – 2:30
9. "I Am the Common Man" – 2:58
10. "St. Kilda Girl's Lament/The St. Kilda Wedding March" – 2:51
11. "The Lads O' The Fair" – 4:00
12. "Sauchiehall Street Salsa (McHugh's Other Foot) (The Man With Two Woman)" – 3:09
13. "The Boar and the Fox" – 4:04
14. "Battle of Waterloo/Kilcoy's March/The Quaker" – 5:08
15. "The Snows of France and Holland" – 3:37
16. "Bad Moon Rising/The Rising Moon Reel" – 3:17
