= Threading =

Threading may refer to:

- Thread (computing), a programming technique
- Threading (epilation), a hair removal method
- Threading (manufacturing), the process of making a screw thread
- Threading (protein sequence), a method for computational protein structure prediction
- Threaded code, another programming technique
- Threaded discussion (conversation threading), a conceptual model, and its instantiations, in digital communication, including IMs, DMs, email, Usenet, commenting utilities, web forums, and so on
