= Seamus Tansey =

Irish flute player

Seamus Tansey, also spelled Séamus Tansey, was an Irish flute player born in Gorteen, County Sligo, Ireland in 1943. He won the All-Ireland flute title in 1965. Seamus Tansey died on July 9, 2022.

== Discography ==
- The Breeze From Erin - Irish Folk Music On Wind Instruments - 1969
- Seamus Tansey With Eddie Corcoran (1967)
- Seamus Tansey With Eddie Corcoran (re-release; 1970)
- Séamus Tansey – Traditional Irish Music (1971)
  - The Best of Seamus Tansey. Traditional Irish Flute (re-release under a different title; undated)
  - Seamus Tansey - re-released as part of the Irish Music Licensing's Celtic Souls, Irish Celtic Ballads & Traditional Music (2006)
- Music from the Coleman Country (1972)
- Traditional music from Sligo (1973)
- King of the Concert Flute (1976)
  - King of the Concert Flute. Remastered (re-release; no date)
- Rosin the Bow (1976)
- Jigs Reels and Airs (1981)
- Easter Snow (1997)
- To Hell with the Begrudgers (1998)
- Words and Music (2001)

In 2009 Paddy Ryan's Dream/Mamma's Pet from The Breeze From Erin recorded with Reg Hall was included in Topic Records 70 year anniversary boxed set Three Score and Ten as track six on the third CD. The track "Sean McKenna's Reels" from Séamus Tansey – Traditional Irish Music was included on the compilation The Champions. 9 Outlet champions play 16 of their best tracks of Irish traditional music in 1974.
