= The King of Rome =

Racing pigeon

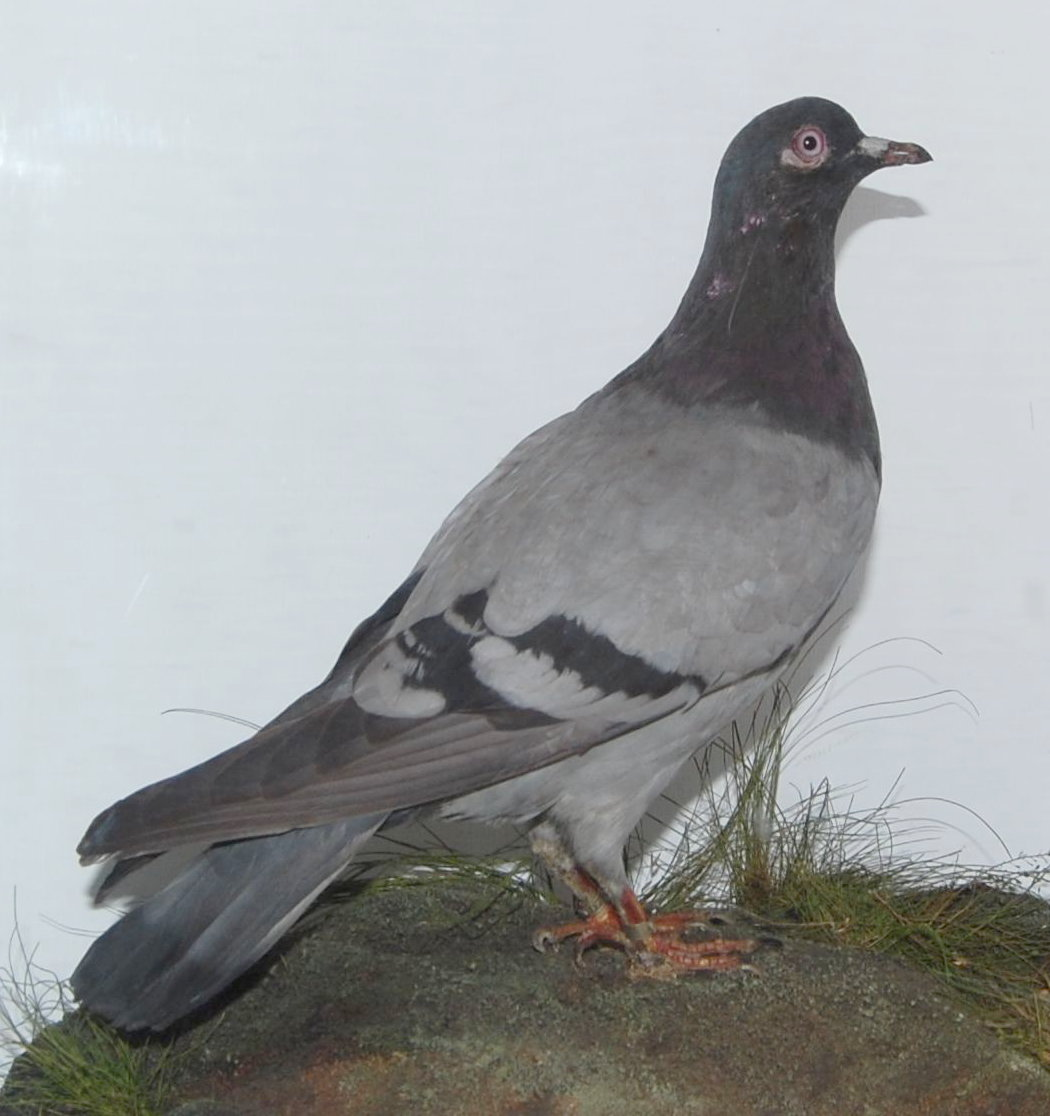
- The preserved bird in Derby Museum
- Species: Columba livia f. domestica
- Breed: Racing pigeon
- Sex: Cock
- Hatched: Derby, England
- Resting place: Derby Museum and Art Gallery
- Known for: Long-distance race winner; Subject of song
- Owner: Charlie Hudson
- Appearance: Blue Cock
- Named after: Rome-England bird race

The King of Rome was a successful racing pigeon, winning a 1,001-mile (1,611 km) race from Rome, Italy, to England, in 1913. Bred and trained in England, it was owned by Charlie Hudson of Derby. It set a new long-distance record for a racing pigeon of England.

The King of Rome is the subject of a 1988 song and a 2010 children's book, both by Dave Sudbury. The best-known of the several recordings of the song is by June Tabor. In 2013 a radio play by Anthony Atkin and Allison Glossop was broadcast to commemorate the 100th anniversary of the pigeon's record-breaking flight.

== The bird ==
The King of Rome was a racing pigeon that in 1913 won a 1,001-mile (1,611 km) race from Rome, Italy to England. The bird, a blue cock, ring number NU1907DY168, was owned, bred and trained by Charlie Hudson (born early 1870s, died 13 March 1958, aged 84), of 56 Brook Street, Derby (now demolished, 52.9265°N 1.4855°W). He reportedly started pigeon racing in 1904.

At the time of the race, he was president and treasurer of Derby Town Flying Club. He also wrote on pigeon-racing matters for the Derby Evening Telegraph. On the bird's death, Hudson presented its body to Derby Museum and Art Gallery, where its taxidermied skin is preserved (accession number DBYMU.1946/48). As of 2012, it is on display there. The preserved pigeon has previously been exhibited on loan elsewhere, including Walsall Museum and Wollaton Hall in Nottingham.

== The race report ==
The 2 August 1913 edition of The Racing Pigeon reported:

Mr C. H. Hudson, of Derby, is to be congratulated on having notified an arrival in Rome race Tuesday last. The bird has proved itself capable of great endurances and of suffering much fatigue, and possessing wonderful staying power to make its way back from Rome to Derby. Up till Tuesday evening out of the 1200 birds sent by Belgian fanciers, 62 birds had been notified. The percentage as a rule that get back of birds sent to Rome by Belgian fanciers works out on average at 7 per cent, so that there are hopes yet that there will be some more English birds home. At any rate, the distance has been accomplished, eclipsing all past long-distance records in the United Kingdom. When it was sent to Rome it was rung as NU1907DY168.

== Representation in other media ==
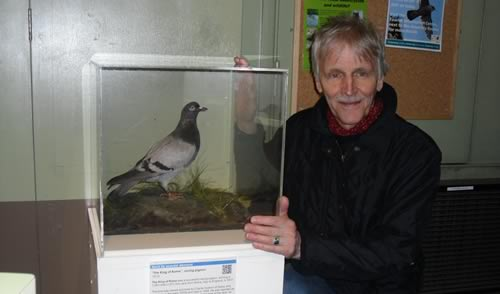
Sudbury with his subject, in 2012. The exhibit label includes a QRpedia QR code.

"The King of Rome"

Song by June Tabor

from the album Aqaba
- Language: English
- Released: 1988
- Genre: Folk
- Label: Topic
- Songwriter: Dave Sudbury
- Producer: Andrew Cronshaw

Dave Sudbury (born Derby, 1943) wrote a song in the 1980s about the King of Rome and its owner, Charlie Hudson. It tells how:

On the day of the big race a storm blew in
A thousand birds were swept away and never seen again

indicating the dangers related to the pigeons' races.

The song was most notably recorded by June Tabor in 1988. She had heard Sudbury perform the song at the Northern Arts Council's 'Songsearch' contest in the late 1980s, where she was a judge. Sudbury came in fourth. Brian McNeill, another finalist at the event, has said: "'The King of Rome' was head and shoulders above every other song sung on the night, and should have won."

Tabor then recorded it for her 1988 album Aqaba. McNeill also has performed the song. He made a live recording included on his 2000 album with Iain MacKintosh, Live and Kicking.

American folksinger Vance Gilbert recorded the song for his 1994 album Edgewise, and Canadian folk musician Garnet Rogers recorded it for his album Small Victories (1990), and again on his live album Summer Lightning (2004). The band Half Man Half Biscuit also recorded a version of the song for a BBC radio session, though it remains unreleased.

At the BBC Radio 2 Folk Awards in 2012, The Unthanks performed the song, with accompaniment from the Brighouse and Rastrick Brass Band. It appears on the 2012 album The Unthanks with Brighouse and Rastrick Brass Band.

Sudbury's song was also published as a 32-page children's book (2010), with illustrations by Hans Saefkow.

Anthony Atkin and Allison Glossop wrote a radio drama, The King of Rome (2013), to commemorate the 100th anniversary of the bird's win. The production starred Wayne Russell as Charlie Hudson, and a recording is available online.

== Other tributes ==
On 29 October 2022 a plaque was unveiled inside the Maypole Inn, Brook Street, Derby, in tribute to Charles Hudson, The King of Rome and Dave Sudbury, after a campaign initiated by historian and former teacher Kalwinder Singh Dhindsa.

On 5 July 2023 the plaque was relocated to Dubrek Studios on Bridge Street.

== See also ==
- List of individual birds
