= The Earl of Errol =

Traditional song

The Earl of Errol (Roud 96, Child 231) is a traditional folk song, existing in several variants. Sometimes the ballad is called Lady Errol.

The earliest known published version of the ballad appeared in Edinburgh Magazine in 1803.

== Synopsis ==
The earl marries; the bride, if named, is Kate; some variants mention the agreement about her dowry, or refer to her tochter (Scots tocher or variants, a dowry or marriage portion).

In various combinations, though always in the order:

- a rumor starts that he was unable to consummate the marriage;
- the bride declares that her clothing still fits as before (she is not becoming plumper, owing to pregnancy);
- a man tells her that her father is selling land to pay her dowry, and she declares there is no need;
- she flees him, to go to law and have the marriage set aside.

In one variant, where she had fled, her sister angrily declares that she would not have shamed her lord like that.

In most, however, the earl takes a mistress (often named Peggy or Meggie), and she bears him a son ninth months later. If the bride had not fled, he sends her back to her father.

== Commentary ==
The earl in question appears to be Gilbert Hay, 11th Earl of Erroll, and the bride Catherine Carnegie, second daughter of James Carnegie, 2nd Earl of Southesk. They married on 7 January 1658 but were childless. A court case was brought about their marriage—if it went unconsummated, the dowry was not due—but the details have been lost.

The spelling Errol used by Child is not the spelling used by the Earls of Erroll. Errol is a first name used in Scotland. The name is based on the placename Errol, a town in Perth and Kinross in Scotland.
