= Alison Kinnaird =

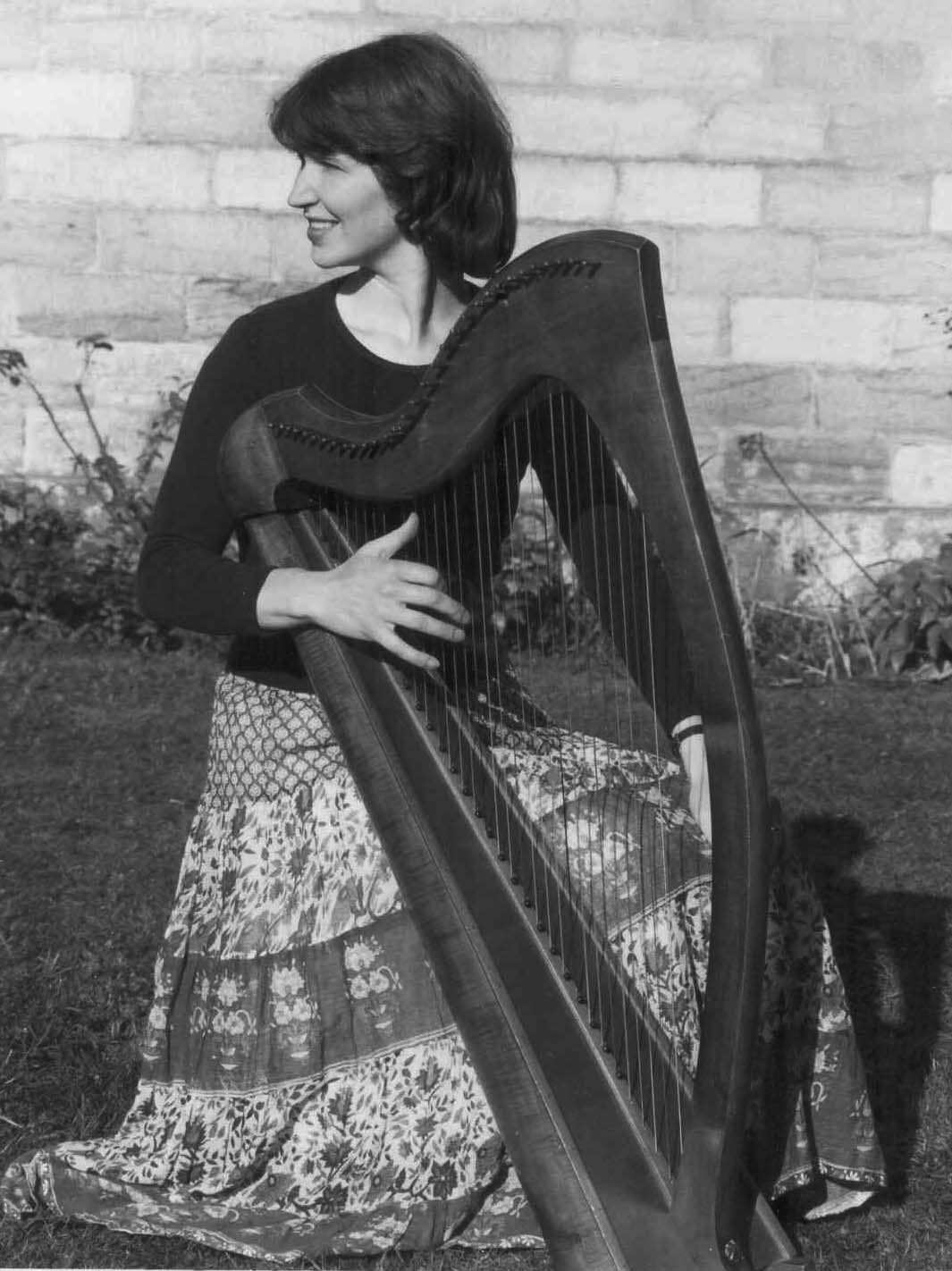

Background information
- Born: 30 April 1949 (age 77)
- Origin: Edinburgh, Scotland
- Genres: Folk music, Celtic music
- Occupations: Musician; sculptor; teacher; writer; glass engraver
- Label: Temple Records
- Website: www.alisonkinnaird.com

Alison Kinnaird MBE (born 30 April 1949) is a Scottish glass sculptor, Celtic musician, teacher, and writer. She is one of the most prominent glass engravers in Scotland.

== Early life and education ==
Alison Kinnaird was born in Edinburgh, Scotland, on 30 April 1949.

Her application to art college having been rejected, Kinnaird earned a MA in Celtic studies and archaeology at the University of Edinburgh, in the course of which she also studied copper wheel glass engraving with Harold Gordon in Forres, having met him while on a family holiday there.

== Career and practice ==
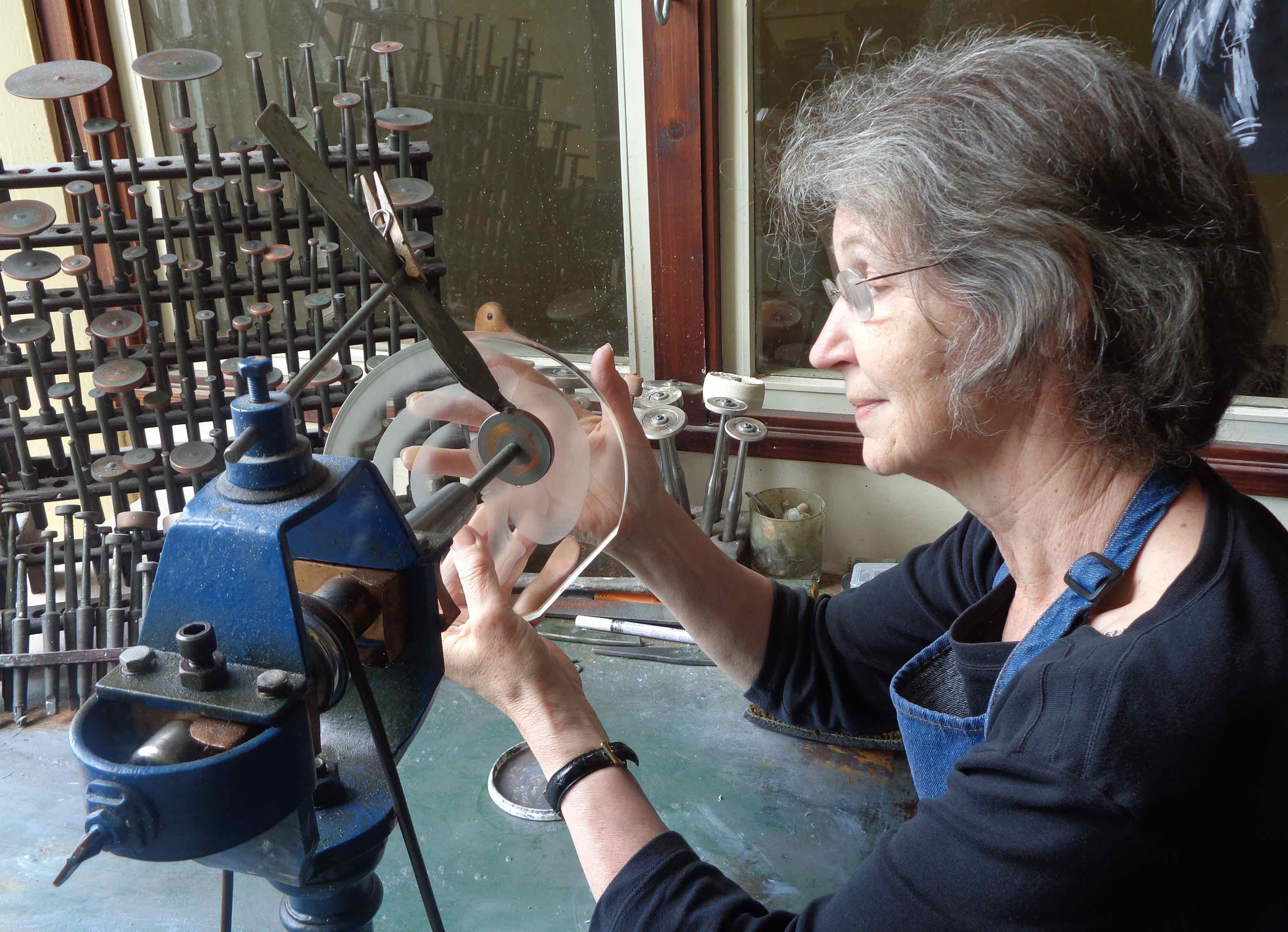
Alison Kinnaird engraving

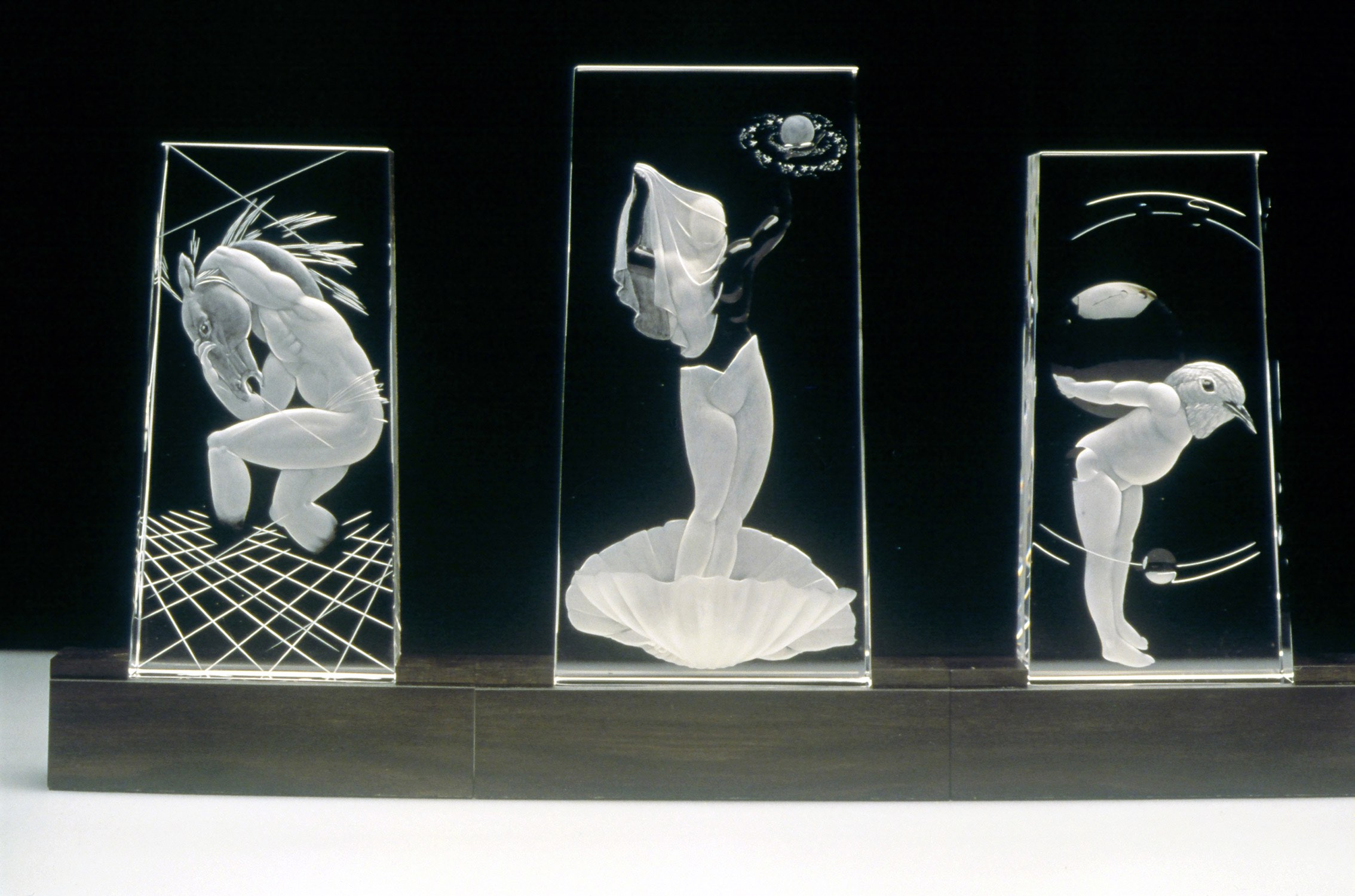
Triptych

Kinnaird is one of the foremost and most original modern glass engravers in Scotland.

Kinnaird's glass engraving works are in many galleries and private collections. She has been commissioned to create pieces for the Royal Family such as an engraved goblet for the late Queen Mother, a bowl for Charles and Diana's wedding, also a blue disc for the Emperor of Japan, and the Donor Window in the Scottish Portrait Gallery. She uses lead and optical crystal. The techniques used by Kinnaird include copper-wheel engraving, cutting, sandblasting, acid etching and casting. Starting in a studio in the High Street, Edinburgh, her work won early recognition and was included in an exchange between the Edinburgh Festival Fringe and the Salzburg Fringe. Later, believing that the small physical size of works produced in traditional glass engraving confines their appreciation to a limited audience, she expanded the scale of her works by using flexible drive engraving and sandblasting, combined with the adventurous use of dichroic glass. More recently she has employed bonded coloured glass as her engraving medium.

Kinnaird is also a musician, a gift that led her to discover relationships between music and glass engraving, notably through designs based on Lissajous figures. She started playing the harp at 14 and has been credited with starting the Scottish harp revival and the Celtic harp renaissance. She plays, teaches and lectures on the small Scottish harp also known as the clàrsach. She was one of the first acts signed to Temple Records during the 1970s and she has had eight albums released through the label. She worked with the Scottish music group Battlefield Band on their albums Music in Trust Vol I (1987) and Music in Trust Vol II (1988).

Kinnaird has written many books about traditional music and the small Scottish harp. Her first book on the subject was published in 1990 and is a collection of 24 harp tunes that she arranged. Tree of Strings (1992), written in collaboration with Keith Sanger, documents the history of the harp in Scotland and is the first book of its kind. The Lothian Collection (1995) has 25 harp tunes from the big houses and great families from East, West and Midlothian all arranged by Kinnaird. The Small Harp Tutor (1996) is a book about learning to play the small harp, which covers the history of the instrument, maintaining the instrument, arranging tunes and gives useful finger exercises. The book is accompanied by a 60-minute CD, which guides the learner from novice to more accomplished player. Kinnaird's most recent book is The North East Collection which features tunes mainly from the 18th and 19th century arranged by herself.

== Recognition and awards ==
In 1997, Kinnaird was awarded the MBE for her contribution and longstanding service to art and music.

In 2011, National Life Stories interviewed Kinnaird for their "Craft Lives" archive. The interviews took place over three days and document her life from childhood to becoming a successful artist and musician.

She is a fellow of the Guild of Glass Engravers.

She has been recognised for her contributions to Scottish folk music, and was inducted into the Scots Trad Music Awards – Hall of Fame in 2010.

Kinnaird has been the recipient of numerous other awards, including:

- 2004: Glass Sellers Award
- 2002: Creative Scotland Award
- 2001: Adrian Sassoon Award
- 1998: CC Chelsea First Exhibitors Award
- 1998: Inches Carr Crafts Bursary
- 1987: Glass-Sellers Award
- 1980: SDA/CCC Crafts Fellowship

== Personal life ==
Kinnaird was married to the musician, producer, and writer Robin Morton until his death.

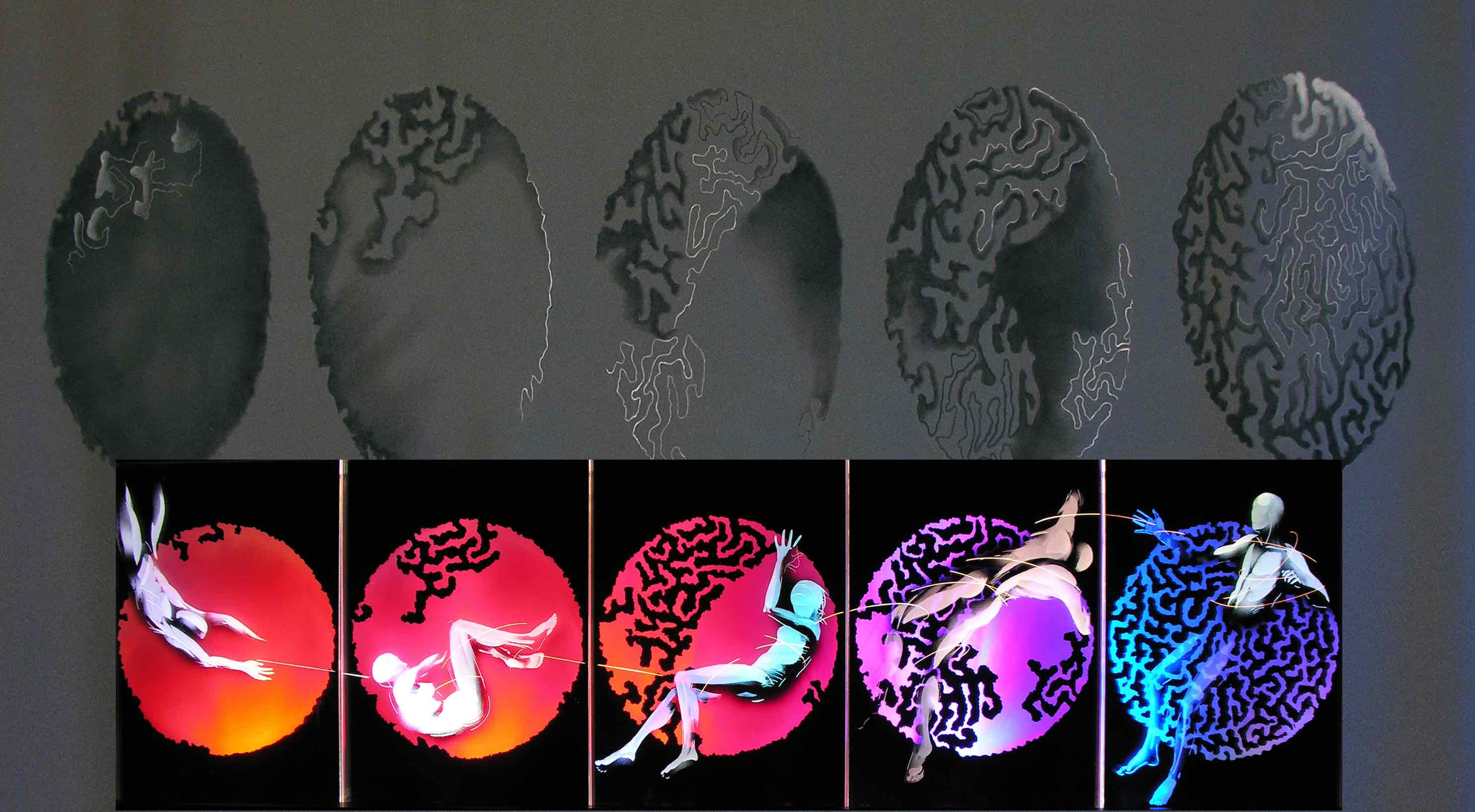
Maze, National Museum of Scotland

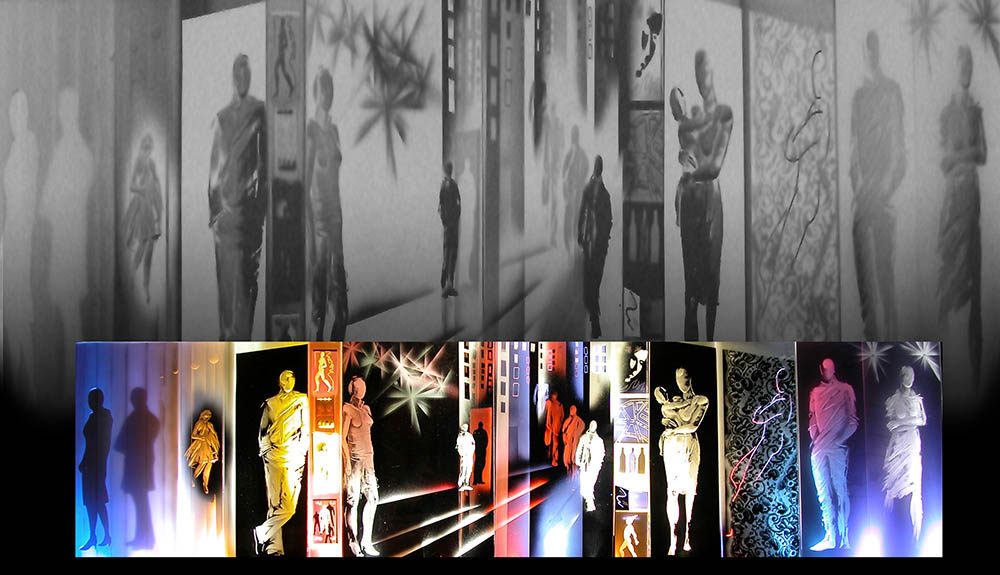
Streetwise 1
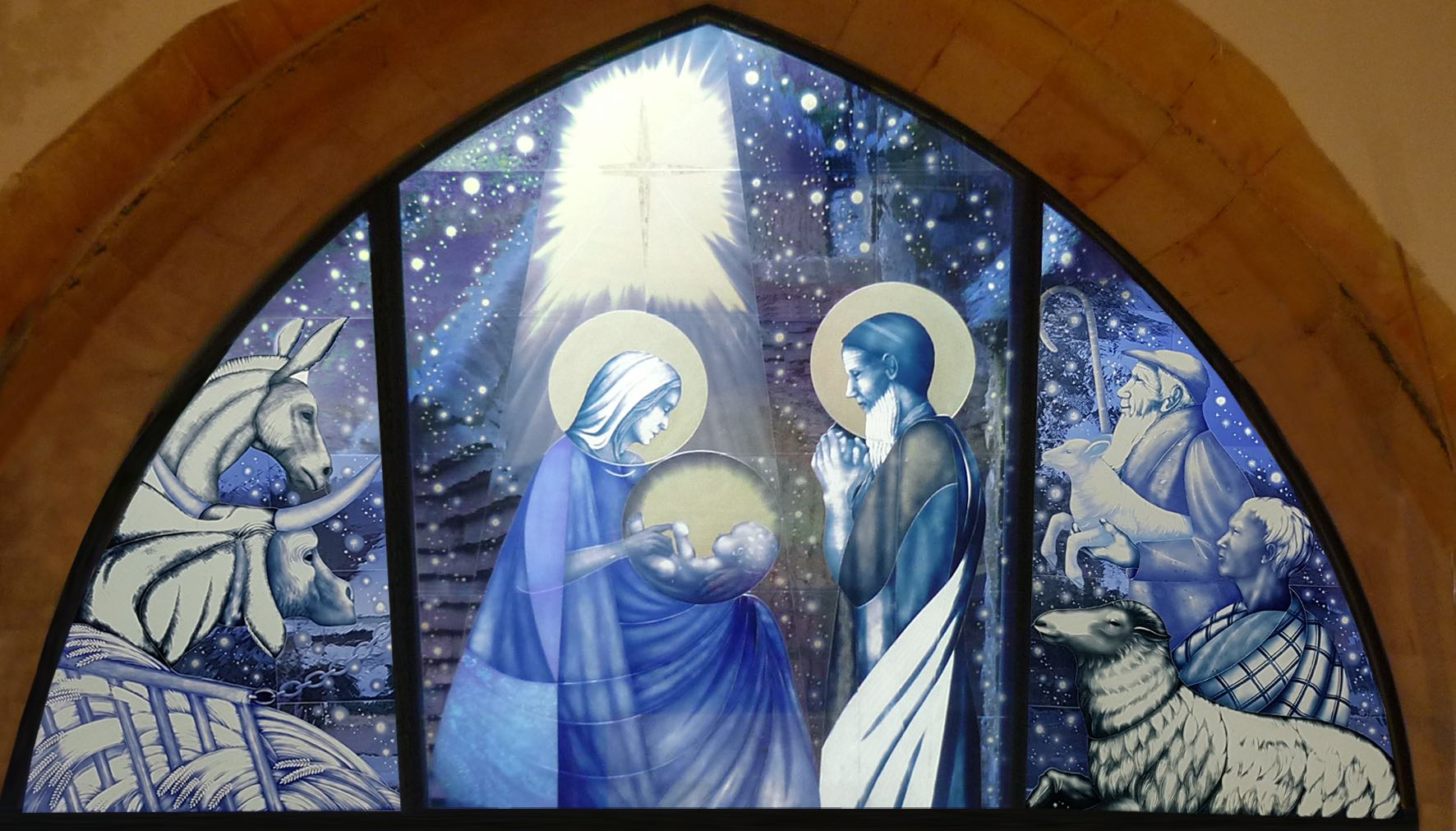
Nativity Window, St Mary's Church Kenardington, Kent

== Memberships ==
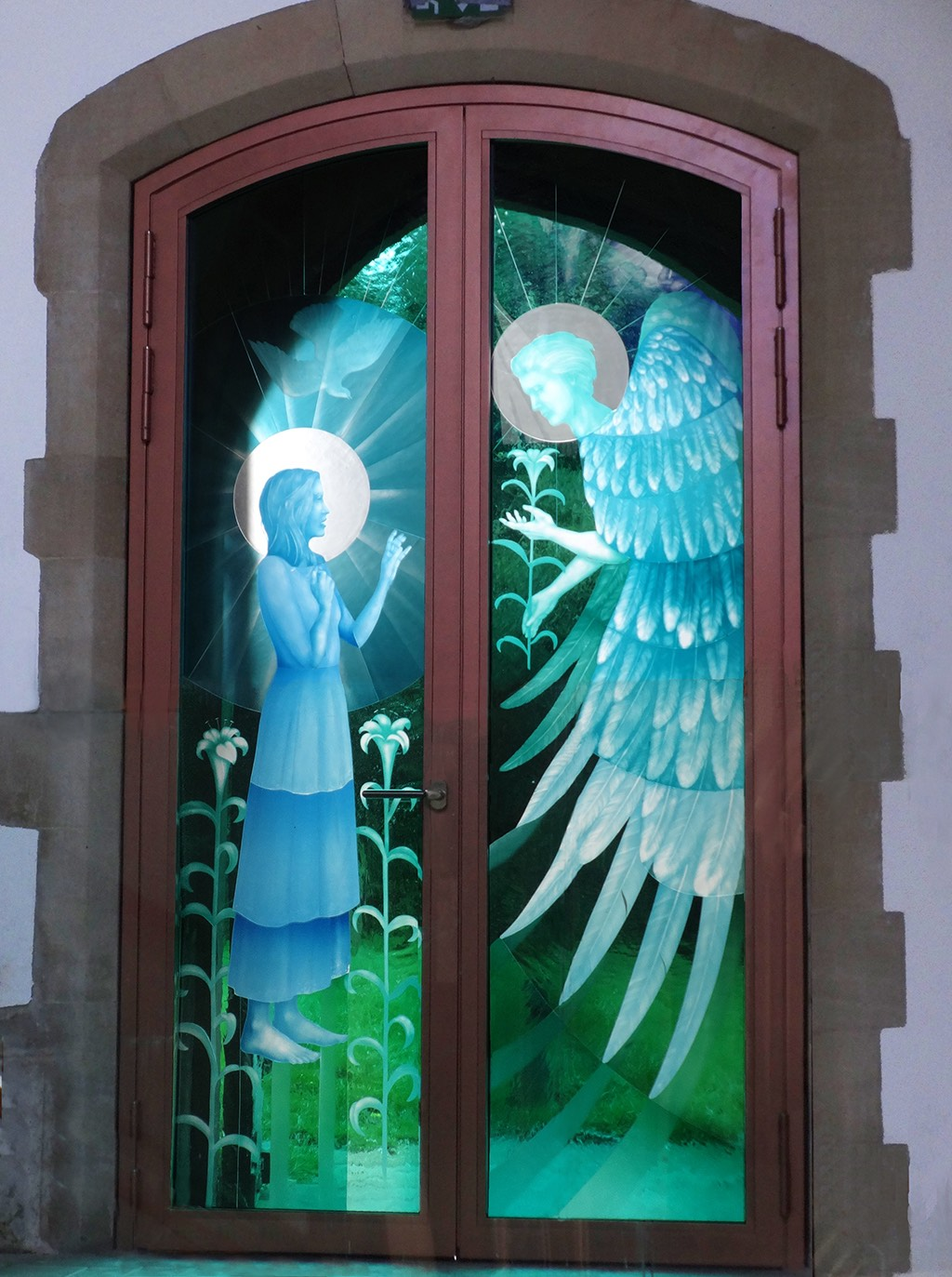
Annunciation Doors, St Mary's Church Kenardington ©

- 2003–2004: Member of the award panel for Creative Scotland Award
- 1993–1996 Scottish Arts Council Crafts Committee
- 1984–1987 BBC Broadcasting Council for Scotland
- Contemporary Glass Society
- Glass Art Society
- Scottish Glass Society
- Index of Selected Makers, Crafts Council

== Teaching ==
- Masterclasses, International Festival of Glass, Stourbridge, England
- Urban Glass, Brooklyn, NY
- College of Art and Design, Wroclaw, Poland
- Northlands Creative Glass, Scotland
- Corning Glass Studio, Corning NY, USA
- Frauenau, Germany

== Selected exhibitions ==
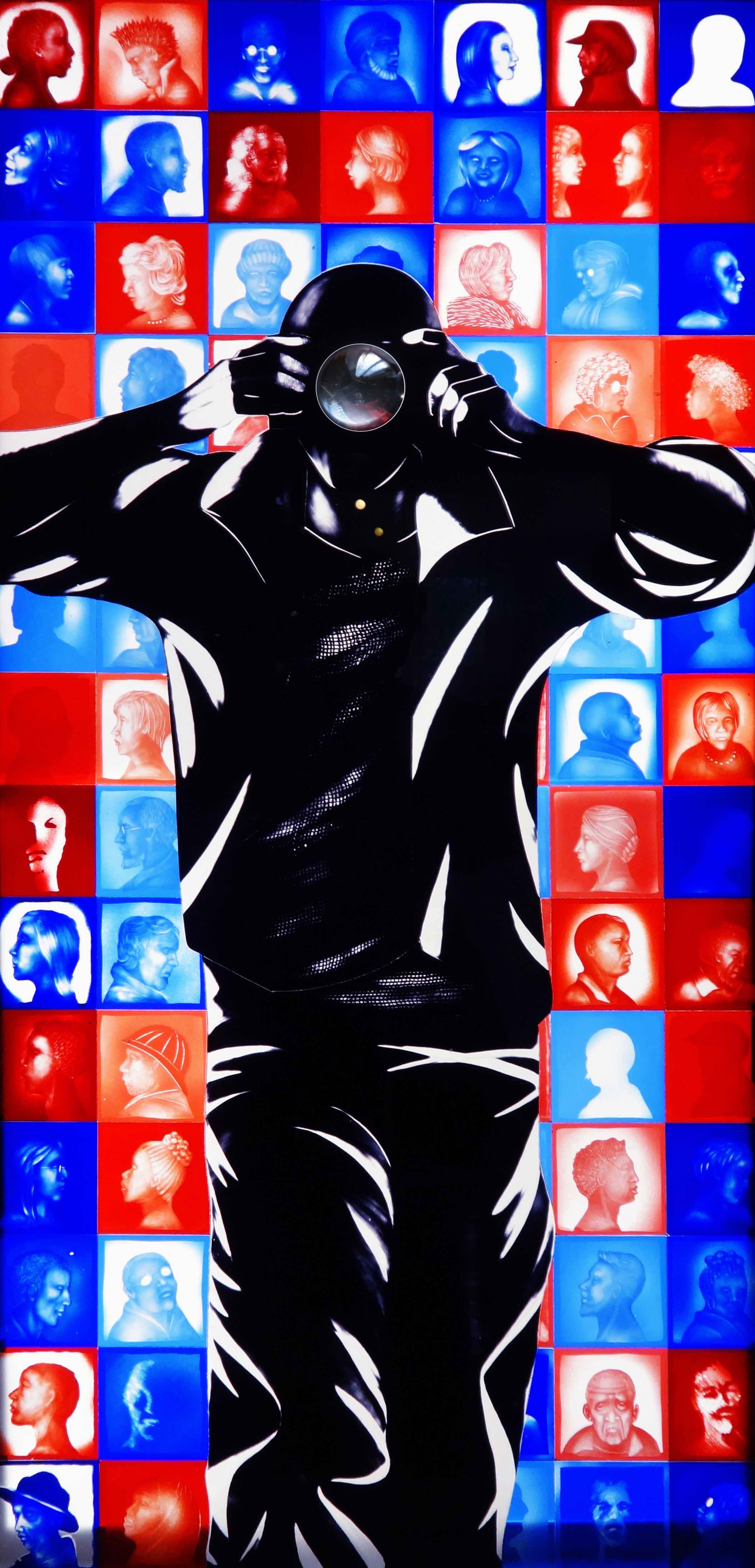
Subway Photographer, Engraved Glass

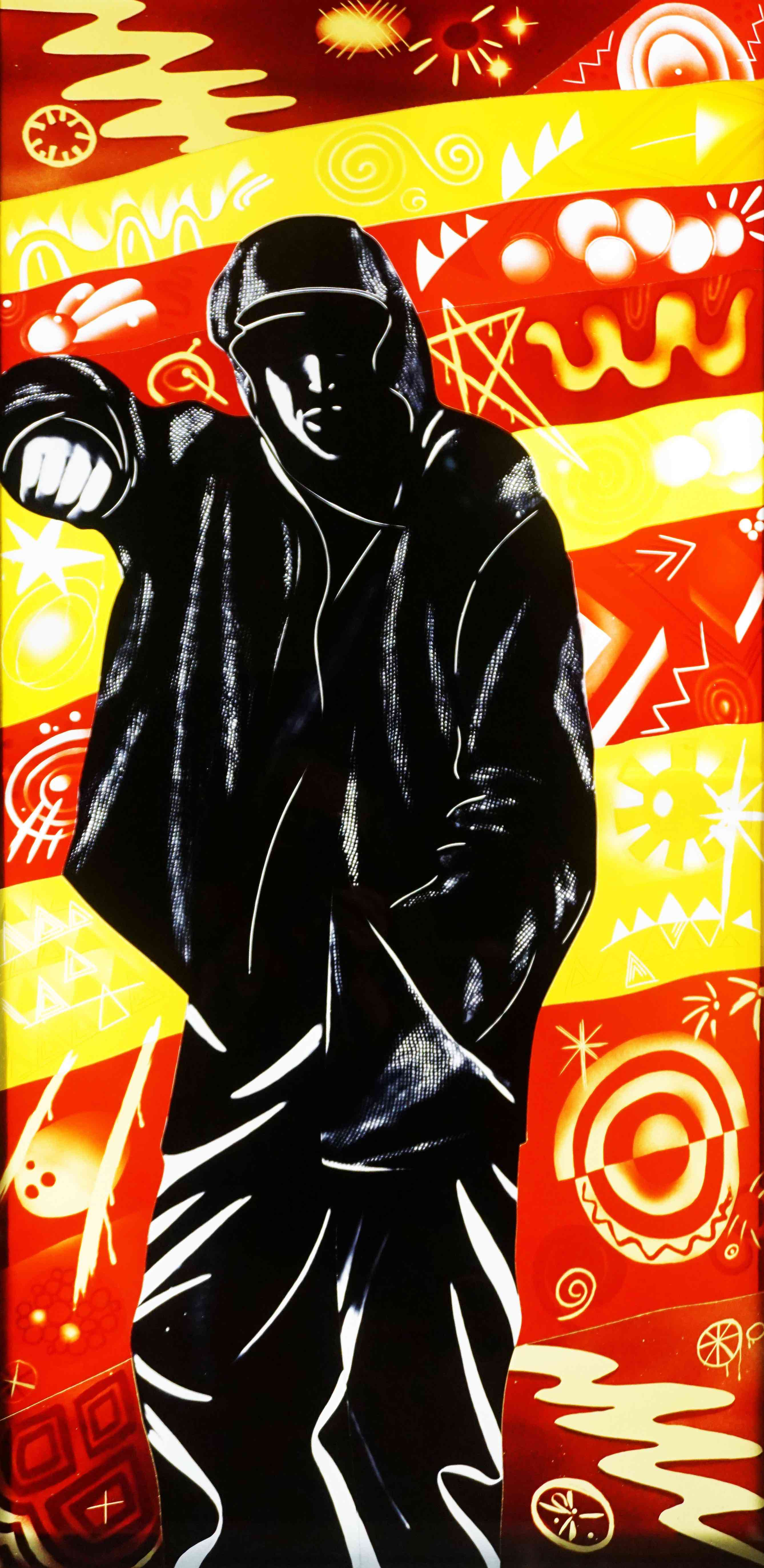
Graffiti Artist, Engraved Glass

- 2018 Berengo Gallery, Murano, Italy
- 2017 Edinburgh International Festival Fringe, solo exhibition
- 2017 Scottish Glass Society, Edinburgh
- 2017 Celebrating 80, London Glassblowing Gallery
- 2016 Unknown, Scottish Parliament to Kirkaldy Art Gallery (ongoing tour)
- 2015 British Glass Biennale, Stourbridge
- 2014 Edinburgh International Festival, solo show
- 2013 SOFA Chicago
- 2013 Edinburgh International Fringe Festival, solo show
- 2012 Luminesce, Linlithgow, Scotland, solo exhibition,
- 2012 Fleming Collection, London
- 2012 The Scottish Gallery, Edinburgh, solo exhibition
- 2012 Travelling exhibition, Wroclaw, Jelenia Gora, Ostrow, Lesno, Poland
- 2011 Johansfors, Kristallmuseum, Sweden
- 2011 British Studio Glass, Coburg
- 2010 Invited Artist, British Glass Biennale
- 2009 Urban Glass, NY, USA
- 2008 The Cutting Edge, Royal Museums of Scotland
- 2007 Invited Artist, Visual Arts Scotland, Royal Scottish Academy
- 2006 British Glass Biennale, Stourbridge
- 2006 Glasmuseet Ebeltoft, Denmark
- 2006 Coburg Glaspreis Exhibition'
- 2005 21st Century British Glass, London
- 2004 Psalmsong, V&A London Museum
- 2004 British Glass Biennale, Stourbridge
- 2004 Broadfield House Glass Museum, Dudley
- 2002 Art for Europe, Brussels
- 2001 Art Glass Gallery, Santa Fe
- 1999 Kaminesky Senov, Czech Republic
- 1999 National Glass Centre, Sunderland
- 1998 Contemporary Applied Arts, London
- 1996 British Glass, Prague
- 1996 Contemporary Arts Centre, Utrecht
- 1988 Solo exhibition, Coleridge, London
- 1987 Group exhibition, Galerie de Vier Linden, Asperen, The Netherlands
- 1984 Group exhibition, Habatat Gallery, Detroit, USA
- 1979 The Bowl, British Crafts Centre, London, organised by World Crafts Council
- 1977 Salzburg Festival, Art Gallery, Salzburg, Austria.
- 1975 Contemporary Scottish Artists, Exhibitions Centre, Edinburgh

== Selected collections ==
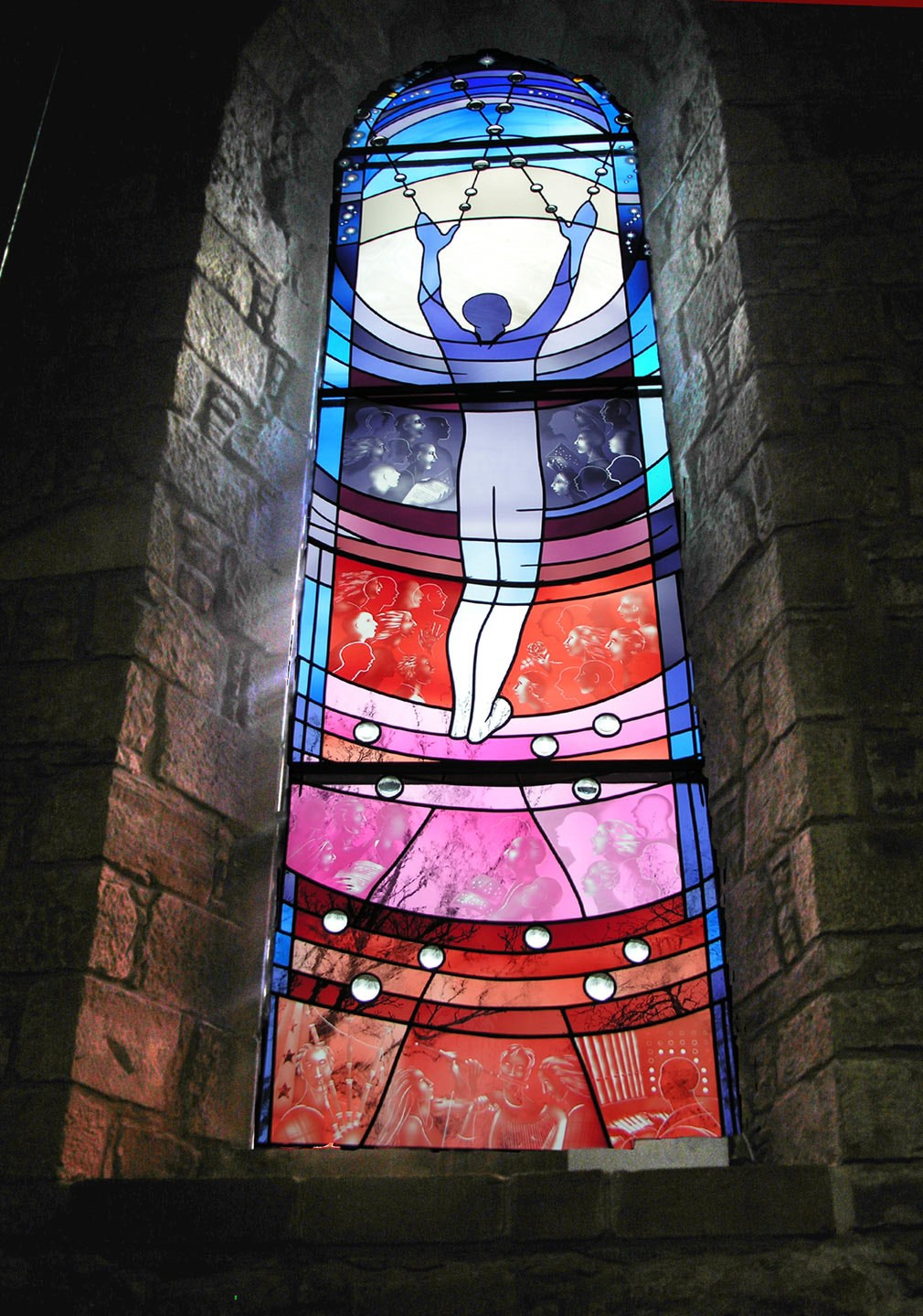
Praise Window, Dornoch Cathedral

- 2016 Eve, Museum of Decorative Arts in Prague
- 2012 Standing Feathers, Aberdeen Art Gallery
- 2010 Adam and Eve, Shipley Art Gallery, Gateshead
- 2008 Maze, National Museum of Scotland
- 2005 Psalmsong, Scottish Parliament, Edinburgh
- 2005 Streetwise I, Tutsek Foundation, Munich
- 2005 Streetwise II, Dundee Museum & Art Gallery
- 2003 Portrait of Roy Dennis, Scottish National Portrait Gallery, Edinburgh
- 2001 Evolve, Broadfield House Glass Museum
- 2001 White Lies, Crafts Council Collection
- 1995 Triptych, Victoria and Albert Museum, London
- 1989 Man into Seal, Corning Museum of Glass, New York City, USA
- 1988 Ring of Crystal, Ring of Stone, Leicester Museum and Art Gallery, Leicester
- 1987 Disc – Leap, Ulster Museum, Belfast
- 1986 Doors on the Past, National Museum of Scotland
- 1986 Disc – She is Summer, Kelvingrove Museum and Art Gallery, Glasgow
- 1980 Doors – engraved block, Scottish Development Agency – Scottish Crafts Collection, Edinburgh

== Selected commissions ==
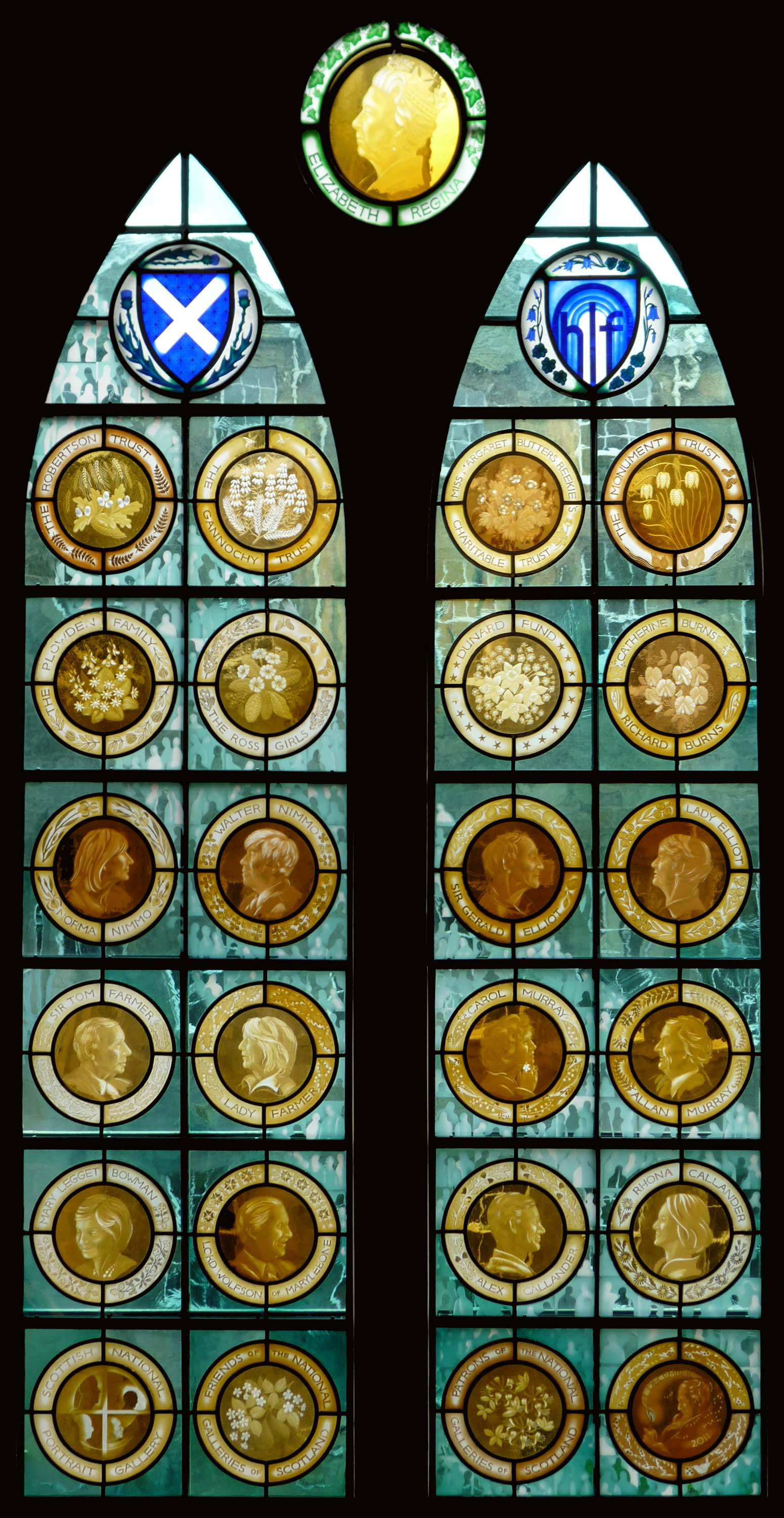
The Donor Window, Scottish National Portrait Gallery, Edinburgh

- 2017 Nativity Window, St Mary's Church, Kenardington, Kent
- 2016 Window, St Cross College, Oxford
- 2015 Quaking Aspen Panels, Beverley Hills, California
- 2014 Windows, Dornoch Cathedral
- 2012 Donor Window, Scottish National Portrait Gallery
- 2009 Self Portrait, Fitzwilliam Museum, Cambridge
- 2007 Interface-Panels for Murano Hotel, Tacoma, USA
- 2006 Butterfly Panels, Marchmont St Giles Church, Edinburgh
- 2004 Praise Window, Dornoch Cathedral
- 2003 Portrait of Roy Dennis, National Portrait Gallery of Scotland
- 2000 Millennium Commission, Broadfield House Glass Museum
- 1993 British Film Institute Awards
- 1992 Door panels, commissioned by Lord Bute of Mount Stuart
- 1991 Alumnus of the Year Award, commissioned by Edinburgh University
- 1990 Gift for His Imperial Highness, the Crown Prince of Japan, commissioned by Royal Bank of Scotland
- 1989 Screen of 10 panels, commissioned by Lord Bute of Mount Stuart
- 1986 Gift for HM the Queen Mother, commissioned by Royal College of Physicians
- 1983 Duke of Edinburgh Design Award, commissioned by Alan Doe of Westland Helicopters
- 1980 Wedding bowl for HRH the Prince of Wales, commissioned by The Scotsman newspaper
- 1979 The Wealth of Nations presented to The London Institute of Banking & Finance in England, commissioned by Institute of Bankers in Scotland

== Books ==
- 2013 Reflections – the Art of Alison Kinnaird, Kinmor Music ISBN 978-0-9540160-2-9
- 2011 Life Story recorded for British Library Crafts Lives series
- 2011 Portrait of the Nation, Trustees of the Scottish National Galleries
- 2008 20th Century British Glass, Charles Hajdamach, Antique Collectors Club ISBN 978-1851495870
- 2007 Invited Contributor, V & A Museum, 150th Anniversary Celebration Album
- 2005 25 Years of New Glass Review, Corning Museum of Glass ISBN 978-0872901605
- 2003 Contemporary International Glass, V & A Pub, Jennifer Hawkins Opie ISBN 9781851774265
- 2002 Artists in Glass, Late Twentieth Century Masters in Glass, Dan Klein, Mitchell Beazley ISBN 978-1840003406
- 1999 Engraced Glass, Marilyn & Tom Goodearl, Antique Collectors Club ISBN 9781851493074
- 1996 Glass Art, Peter Layton, Black, University of Washington Press ASIN B012YSKB7W

== Bibliography ==
- 2002: The North East Collection ISBN 978-0954016012
- 1996: The Small Harp Tutor ISBN 0-9511204-2-5
- 1995: The Lothian Collection ISBN 0951120484
- 1992: Tree of Strings ISBN 0951120433

== Discography ==
- 2004: The Silver String
- 1994: Mac-talla – Mairidh Gaol Is Ceol
- 1992: The Harper's Land (with Ann Heymann)
- 1990: The Quiet Tradition (with Christine Primrose)
- 1988: The Scottish Harp
- 1988: Music in Trust Vol. 2 (with Battlefield Band)
- 1986: Music in Trust Vol. 1 (with Battlefield Band)
- 1979: The Harp Key – Crann Nan Teud ASIN B003V9AAOS (Temple US Records)
- 1976: Craobh Nan Ubhal (Traditional Gaelic Songs From The Western Isles) by Flora MacNeil (tracks 8 and 10)
