= Robin Morton (musician) =

Irish musician (1939–2021)

- Born: 24 December 1939; Portadown, Armagh, Northern Ireland
- Died: 1 October 2021 (aged 81)
- Genres: Folk music, Celtic music
- Years active: 1967–1979
- Label: Temple Records
- Website: www.templerecords.co.uk

Robin Morton (24 December 1939 – 1 October 2021) was an Irish folk musician, song collector, broadcaster, record producer, band manager, and founder of the Temple Records label and the Kinmor publishing company.

== Early life and education ==
Morton was born in County Armagh, Northern Ireland on 24 December 1939 and was drawn to music from an early age through his father's interest in jazz, which motivated him to teach himself to play the cornet. After leaving school, he taught mentally handicapped children for which he received training for a year in Manchester, where he bought his first guitar. In 1962, he enrolled at Queens University in Belfast to study for a diploma in Social work, and began to attend folk clubs. After graduating, he obtained further qualification as a psychiatric social worker from the London School of Economics. He then returned to Belfast and began working in child psychiatry. In late 1970, Morton moved to Scotland to study for a PhD at the University of Edinburgh, with a focus on the history of the treatment of madness, but he did not complete it.

== Career ==
Morton founded the folk band Boys of the Lough in 1967 along with Tommy Gunn and Cathal McConnell and left the band in 1979, after setting up a folk label called Temple Records in 1978.

In 1980, he became manager of the Scottish folk group Battlefield Band and continued to manage and release material by the band until his death on 1 October 2021. Morton set up Temple US Records in the 1980s, as well as the publishing company Kinmor Publishing which produces music, and publishes books and sheet music.

In 2006, the folk music magazine The Living Tradition covered Morton's life and career in an 11-page special published in their 66th issue.

== Personal life ==
Morton was married to the glass engraver and musician Alison Kinnaird.

== Discography ==
him and Cathal McConnell

- An Irish Jubilee (1976)

Boys of the Lough

- The Boys of the Lough (1973)
- Second Album (1973)
- Live at Passim's (1974)
- Lochaber No More (1976)
- The Piper's Broken Finger (1976)
- Good Friends ... Good Music (1977)
- Wish You Were Here (1978)
