= Alan Reid (musician) =

- Born: 2 May 1950 (age 76); Glasgow, Scotland
- Genre: Folk rock
- Occupations: Musician, songwriter
- Instruments: keyboards, guitar, vocals
- Years active: 1969–present
- Formerly of: Battlefield Band
- Website: alansongsreid.com

Alan Reid (born 2 May 1950, Glasgow, Scotland) is a Scottish folk multi-instrumentalist and songwriter. He was a founding member of Battlefield Band, which combined traditional Celtic melodies and new material.

== Biography ==
=== 1969–2010: the Battlefield Band years ===
==== Most enduring founding member ====
Alan Reid joined Battlefield Band in 1969, at a time when they were evolving into a folk group. From 1973, Battlefield Band quickly became pre-eminent in the emerging Scottish Traditional music scene, becoming established firmly at the forefront where they remain today. Battlefield Band made two albums with the Breton label Arfolk (released in 1976 & 1978) and three albums with the Topic label (released in 1977, 1978 & 1979) but since 1980, have recorded exclusively with Temple Records. Reid travelled the world with the band and has been involved in over 30 albums. Although the band's lineup changed many times, Reid was a keyboarder and known as the "father and son" of Battlefield Band.

Alan Reid is credited with introducing keyboards to the Scottish folk music scene, first using a pump organ and later electronic keyboards with Battlefield Band. The instrumentation initially drew mixed reactions from fans and music critics, but keyboards eventually became an established part of the band's sound, and their example is often cited as opening the way for other Celtic bands to incorporate similar instrumentation.

==== 1997–2009: solo and duo side projects ====
In 1997, while remaining a member of Battlefield Band, Reid released his first solo album, The Sunlit Eye, on Temple Records. It featured brand new songs and tunes.

In 2001, a song and tune book Martyrs Rogues and Worthies was released by Kinmor Music, the publishing arm of Temple Records.

Reid also formed a duo with singer/guitarist Rob van Sante and released in 2002 on the Red Sands Records label a CD album entitled Under The Blue which featured more new songs.

He also appeared as guest singer in Vol. 1 and 2 of the Linn Records series of the complete works of Robert Burns.

In 2009, he was nominated at the Scots Traditional Awards in the Composer of the Year category.

The same year, the duo released a second album entitled The Rise and Fall o' Charlie on the Red Sands Records label.

=== 2010–2020: departure from Battlefield Band and duo with Rob van Sante ===
After four decades (from 1969 - 2010) as an ever-present member of Battlefield Band, Reid decided that it was time to bow out in order to develop his writing and to follow other musical paths and partnerships: he left Battlefield Band at the end of 2010 to concentrate on his musical duo with Rob van Sante who had also been Battlefield Band's sound engineer for a number of years.

In early 2011, the duo undertook a tour of Australia and New Zealand, guesting at Australia's National Folk Festival.

In 2011, Reid released Recollection, a compilation album of the finest songs he wrote during his forty years with Battlefield Band.

In 2012, the duo released a third album The Adventures of John Paul Jones on the life of the Scots born sailor John Paul Jones, an album for which Reid has written all the material.

In 2013, the duo embarked on several tours of Scotland, Germany and the United States and made some festival appearances in the UK and Europe.

In 2014, the duo released a fourth album, Rough Diamonds, on the Red Sands Records label.

In January 2015, the duo embarked on a US tour, which ended on 1 February 2015, A North-America tour followed from 13 to 29 March 2015, visiting mainly Canada.

On 15 January 2016, the duo embarked on a 16-date US tour due to end on 7 February 2016.

In 2017, the duo released a fifth and final album entitled The Dear Green Place on the Red Sands Records label.

=== 2020–present: solo career ===
Following the end of his duo with Rob van Sante, which coincided with the onset of the COVID-19 pandemic, Alan Reid has pursued a solo career, performing at venues and folk festivals internationally.

== Distinctive musical style and songwriting skills ==
Reid's songwriting frequently draws on imagery and narratives involving both ordinary people and historical figures. Critics have noted that his compositions typically feature melodies described as memorable and singable.

== Discography ==
=== Battlefield Band ===
All the Battlefield Band albums from 1976's Scottish Folk (Arfolk SB349) (re-released as Farewell to Nova Scotia on Escalibur Records) up to 2009's Zama Zama...Try Your Luck... (Temple Records COMD2102)

=== Solo ===
- 1997 The Sunlit Eye (Temple Records) (studio album)
- 2011 Recollection (Temple Records) (compilation)

=== Alan Reid and Brian McNeill Duo albums ===
- 1981 Sidetracks

=== Alan Reid and Rob van Sante Duo albums ===
- 2001 Under the Blue (Red Sands Records RSCD 001)
- 2009 The Rise and Fall o' Charlie (Red Sands Records RSCD 002)
- 2012 The Adventures of John Paul Jones (Red Sands Records RSCD 003)
- 2014 Rough Diamonds (Red Sands Records RSCD 004)
- 2017 The Dear Green Place (Red Sands Records RSCD 006)

=== Guest appearances ===
- Tuomas Holopainen – Music Inspired by the Life and Times of Scrooge (2014)
