= Temple Records (1978 UK label) =

British record label

Temple Records was a record label founded in 1978 by Robin Morton, previously a member of The Boys of the Lough. It was located in Temple, Midlothian. Although Morton is from Ulster, the label is devoted almost purely to acoustic Scottish traditional music. Morton worked as a producer for Topic Records. This label was not interested in recording the clarsach player Alison Kinnaird, as they did not think the record would sell. He formed Temple Records to release her first LP, The Harp Key (1978), which became a best selling traditional music record. Morton later married Kinnaird.

One of the earliest signings was The Battlefield Band, who rapidly rose to international fame. Morton became their manager in 1980. All their albums are on the Temple label (except for their debut and third ones released on the Escalibur label). The success of the Battlefield Band in America prompted Morton to set up Temple US Records in the mid-1980s. As well as recordings by current folk artists, the label has released historic recordings by James Scott Skinner. The Scottish Gaelic "supergroup" Mac-Talla, formed in 1992 at Morton's suggestion, was composed wholly of the label's artists. Morton also founded Temple US Records, based in Arlington, Massachusetts, in the late 1970s.

== See also ==
- List of record labels
