= Scottish Cant =

Variety of the Romani language

- Scots-Romani
- Native to: United Kingdom
- Region: Scotland
- Ethnicity: Scottish Romani
- Native speakers: 460 in Scotland (2011)
- Language family: Indo-European: Indo-Iranian; Indo-Aryan; Western Indo-Aryan; Romani; Scottish Cant

Language codes
- ISO 639-3: trl
- Glottolog: trav1235

Scottish Cant, Scots Romani, Scotch Romani or the Scottish Romani language is a cant and variety of the Romani language spoken by Lowland Romani (Lowland Gypsies), who primarily live in the Scottish Lowlands.

== Classification ==
Up to 50% of Scottish Cant originates from Romani-derived lexicon.

The Scottish Gaelic element in the dialects of Scottish Cant is put anywhere between 0.8% and 20%.

== Romani vocabulary ==
The percentage of traditional Romani lexical vocabulary is said to be up to 50% of the lexicon; some examples are:

- gadgie "man" (Romani gadžó "a non-Romani person")
- pannie "water" (Romani paní)

== Use of archaic Scots ==
Scottish Cant uses numerous terms derived from Scots which are no longer current in Modern Scots as spoken by non-Travellers, such as mowdit "buried", mools "earth", both from muild(s), and gellie, from gailey (galley), "a bothy".

== Gaelic influences ==
Loans from Gaelic include words like:

- cluishes "ears" (Gaelic cluasan or cluais, a dative form of cluas "ear")
- shain "bad" (Gaelic sean "old")

== Recordings ==
Hamish Henderson and other folklorists recorded various conversations about the Scottish Cant language, with speakers including Lizzie Higgins and Jeannie Robertson. He also recorded Belle Stewart singing a version of "Dance to Your Daddy" in both Cant and Scots.

== See also ==
- Angloromani language
- Beurla Reagaird
- Shelta
