= Andrew Lammie =

Traditional song

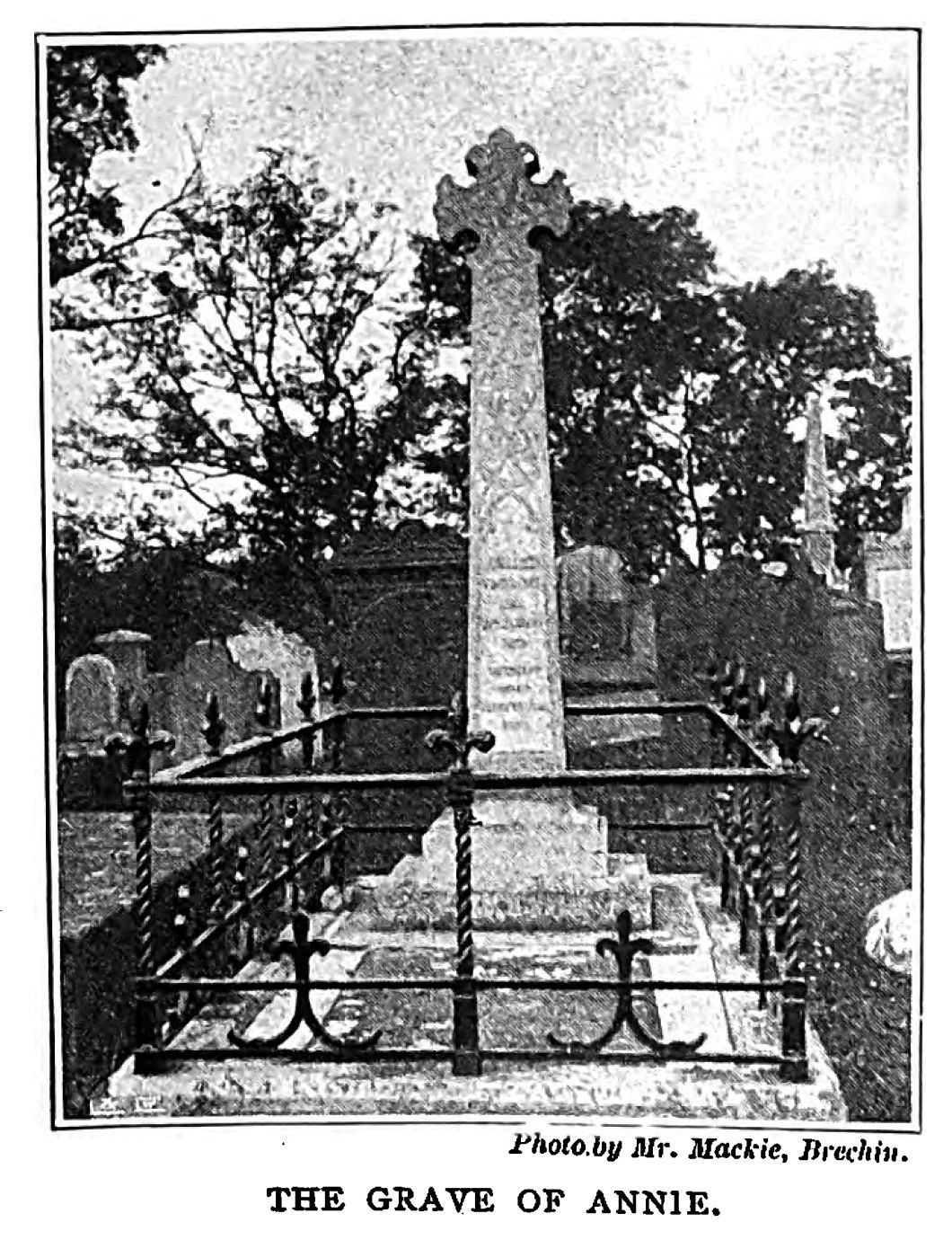
The grave of Agnes Smith in the Fyvie kirkyard.

"Andrew Lammie", also known as Mill o' Tifty or Mill o' Tifty's Annie, is a traditional Scottish ballad, set in Aberdeenshire, and catalogued as Child ballad 233 (Roud 98). It tells the story of an ill-fated romance between Annie, the daughter of the miller at Tifty, and Andrew Lammie, the trumpeter for the lord of nearby Fyvie Castle. The romance is thwarted by Annie's ambitious family, who disapprove of the trumpeter's low rank. In most versions, the ballad ends with Annie's death at the hands of her brother.

The ballad is said to recount a historical event, with the heroine "Bonnie Annie" being buried in the churchyard at Fyvie. In 1825, Peter Buchan described the song as "one of the greatest favourites of the people in Aberdeenshire that I know." The "Annie" of the title is traditionally identified with Agnes Smith, who died in 1673.

"Andrew Lammie" is one of a group of several traditional Scottish ballads that, in many versions, use a "single rhyme" throughout, with the second line of each verse rhyming loosely with either "Lammie" or "Annie". The stress falls on the penultimate syllable of the rhyming line, resulting in a feminine rhyme that is unusual in Scottish ballads. Each stanza has four lines; the first and third lines have four beats while the second and fourth lines have three. Other popular ballads sharing similar meter and rhyme schemes include Barbara Allen and The Dowie Dens of Yarrow. These ballads are often sung to the same or similar melodies.

== Synopsis ==
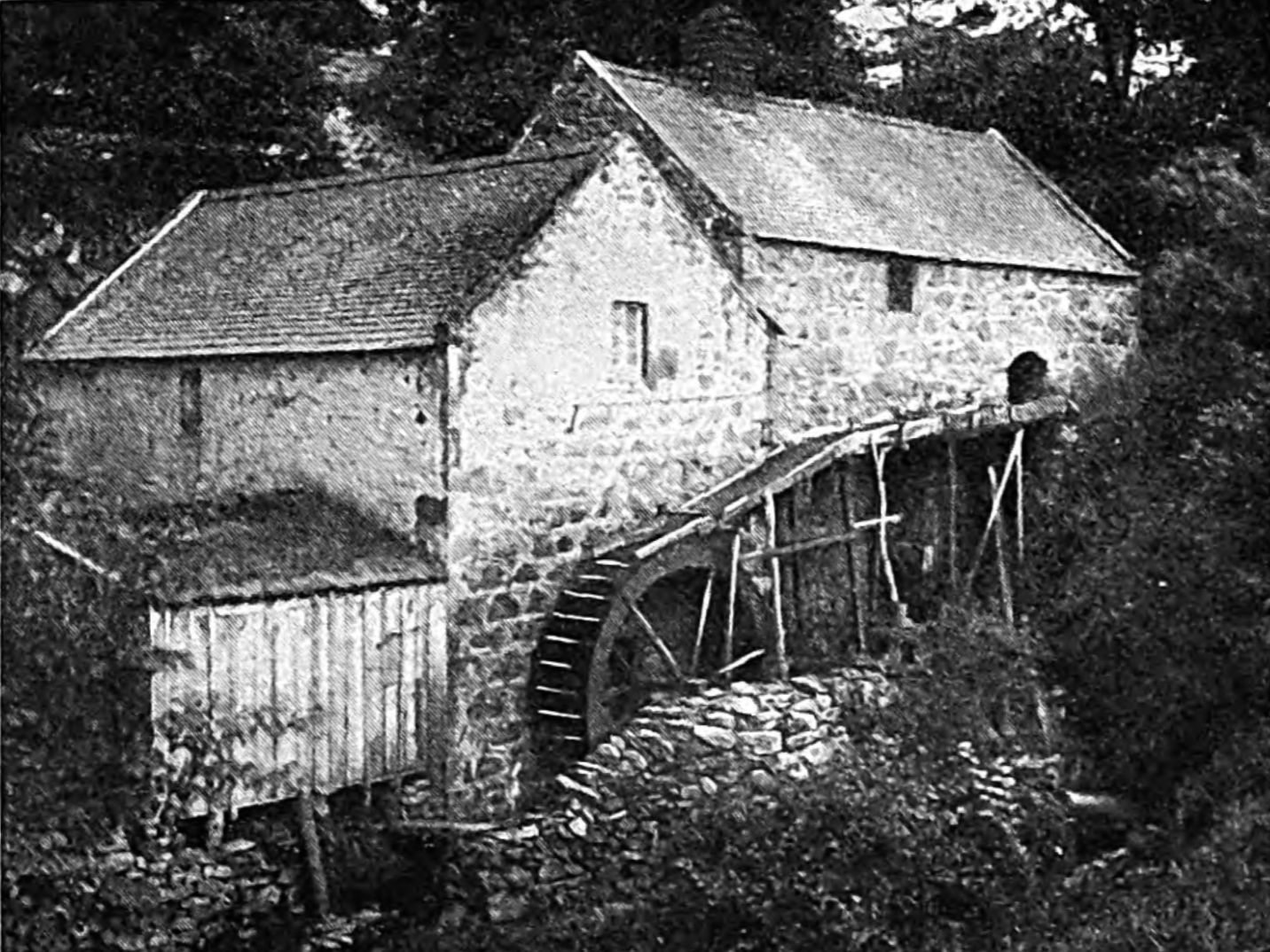
The mill at Tifty, as it stood in the 1890s.

Annie, daughter of the miller of Tifty, falls in love with Andrew Lammie, trumpeter for the lord of Fyvie. Her parents refuse permission because of Lammie's low rank as a servant. He has to leave, and although he has promised fidelity and to return, she sickens. Her family, set against the match, try beatings to make her give him up, but it is unavailing. They may send to the lord accusing Andrew Lammie of bewitching her, but the lord believes his claim that it was only love.

She dies, either of a broken heart or her back broken by her brother. Her father may repent of his insistence. In many versions, Andrew Lammie dies soon after.

== Variants ==
The earliest extant version of "Andrew Lammie" appeared as a broadside ballad in 1776. Francis James Child catalogued three versions of the song in the 19th century. Of these, most known sung versions of the ballad are variants of Child's third version (Child 233 C).

Although most contemporary versions of the ballad are fairly short, the original version of Child 233 C has 49 verses. The traditional singer Jane Turriff sang a version with 52. Turriff and other traditional singers would vary length of the song depending on the audience.

Most versions of the song refer to Annie's brother breaking her back on the "ha' door", referring to the main entrance to a farmhouse. However, certain variants arising from the Traveller singing tradition refer to this fatal blow being delivered on "the temple stane", or in one recorded variant "the altar stane".

Although most versions of the ballad retain the basic narrative in which Annie dies first and Andrew dies later (or does not die at all within the story), in a Nova Scotia variant Andrew dies first and it is Annie who exclaims "My true loved died for me today, I'll die for him tomorrow". Tristram P. Coffin considered this to be an example of a cliched phrase overpowering the story.

== Themes ==
"Andrew Lammie" shares the themes of martyrdom and tragic love with many Scottish ballads. It shares with ballads such as The Bride's Burial the trope of the would-be bride whose purity is "guaranteed by death".

Like "The Dowie Dens of Yarrow", this ballad tells the story of a woman who, despite social pressure, is able to take control of her own life, at the cost of losing it. A review of recordings of traditional singers held at the School of Scottish Studies, recorded between 1951 and 1997, found that it was among the ten most popular among women singers but not among men.

The brother's violence is also a common theme in many Scottish ballads, including The Cruel Brother and Bonnie Susie Cleland. Contemporary singers including Martin Simpson and Iona Fyfe have cited this ballad as an example of a Scottish honour killing. Ballads about honour killings are found in both the Scottish and Scandinavian ballad traditions, although "Andrew Lammie" is unusual in that the victim's entire family participates in the violence.

== Recordings ==
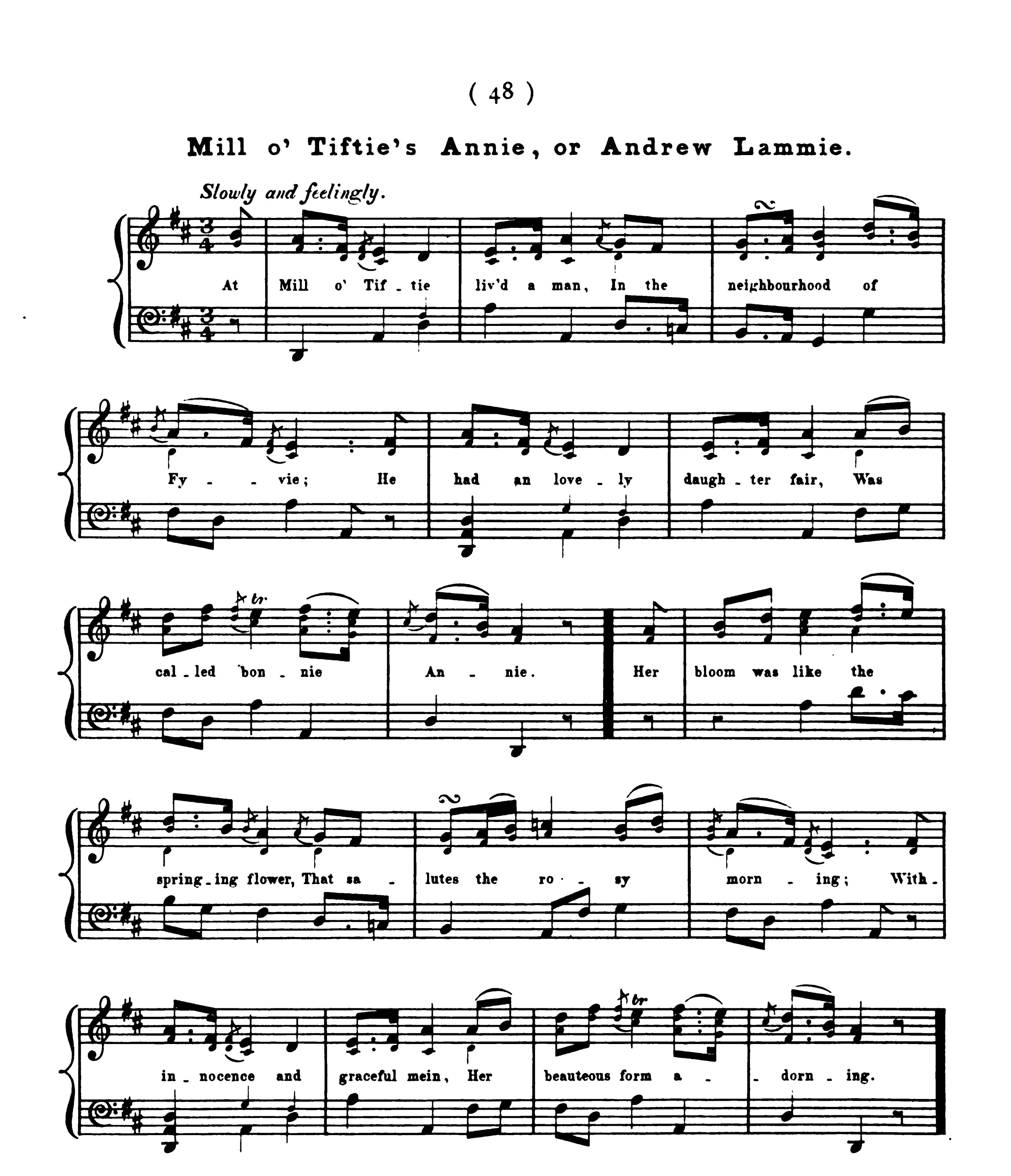
1877 sheet music to "Andrew Lammie".

Year	Performer	Album/Single	Title
1961 (Note: From Smithsonian Folkways field recordings, 1959-1960.)	Lucy Stewart	Lucy Stewart: Traditional Singer from Aberdeenshire, Scotland, Vol. 1—Child Ballads	Tifty's Annie
1968	Sheila Stewart	Back o' Benachie	Mill o’ Tiffy’s Annie
1972	Ray Fisher	The Bonny Birdy	Mill O'Tifty's Annie
1973	The Boys of the Lough	The Boys of the Lough	Andrew Lammie
1998 (Note: From 1953 field recording by Alan Lomax. Probably the longest version - over 13 minutes.)	Jeannie Robertson	The Queen Among the Heather	Bonnie Annie and Andrew Lammie
1978	Jean Redpath	Song of the Seals	Mill o' Tifty's Annie
1986	Ewan MacColl	Blood and Roses - vol 5	Andrew Lammie
1997	Gordeanna McCulloch	Ballads	Mill o' Tifty's Annie
1999	Old Blind Dogs	The World's Room	Mill o' Tifty
2000	Asonance	Alison Gross	Krutý bratr (Note: Czech translation (Cruel Brother).)
2004	Hilary James & Simon Mayor	Laughing with the Moon	Andrew Lammie
2007	Martin Simpson	Prodigal Son	Andrew Lammie
2007	Kate Rusby	Awkward Annie	Andrew Lammie
2011	Craig Herbertson	A Health To The Ladies	Andrew Lammie
2020	Iona Fyfe	Ballads Vol. I	Mill o' Tifty's Annie
2024	Amanda MacLean	365 Days Of Folk	Mill O'Tifty's Annie

== Adaptations ==
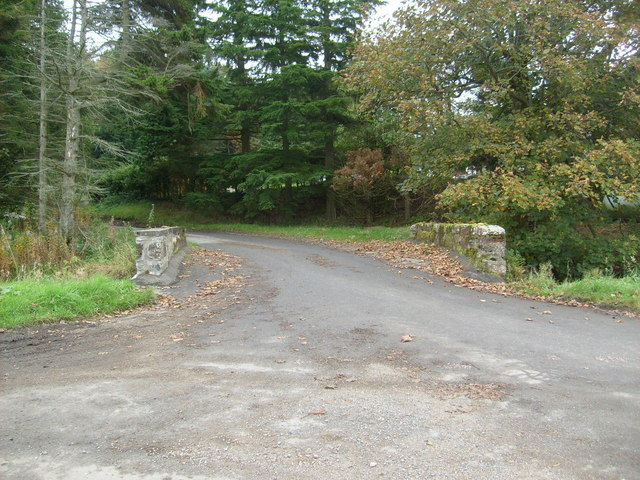
Bridge over Skeugh Burn, between Fyvie and Tifty. The bridge is approximately 100 yards from the 17th century bridge, at which according to some versions of the ballad Andrew and Annie had their final meeting.

This ballad forms the unifying device of a ballad opera, Mill O' Tifty's Annie, by the Scottish composer Eric James Reid (1935–1970). There were several performances in the 1960s. Subsequently, a concert suite devised by Geoffrey Atkinson from the opera was made available.

The ballad's narrative was dramatised by John Purser in his radio play The Secret Commonwealth, broadcast on BBC Radio 4 in December 1997.

A novel based on the ballad, entitled The Flax Flower, was published by Amanda MacLean in 2015.

== Landscape ==
Several landmarks near Fyvie are associated with the ballad. The gravestone of Agnes Smith stands in the Fyvie kirkyard. The original 17th-century headstone was replaced in 1845, and in 1869 a polished granite cross was added by public subscription. In Fyvie Castle, a statue of a trumpeter traditionally held to represent Andrew Lammie stands at the top of Preston Tower.

The location of the farmhouse where she lived was about half a mile (0.8 km) from Fyvie Castle, uphill from Tifty's Mill. The 17th-century bridge over Skeugh Burn, which figures in some versions of the ballad as the place of Annie and Andrew's final parting, was located a distance upstream of the later road bridge.

== Works cited ==
- Child, Francis James (1890). "Andrew Lammie". The English and Scottish Popular Ballads, Volume 4. pp. 300–308.
- Coffin, Tristram Potter (1963). The British Traditional Ballad in North America. American Folklore Society. ISBN 978-0-292-70719-1.
- McCarthy, William Bernard (2003). ""Barbara Allen" and "The Gypsy Laddie": Single-Rhyme Ballads in the Child Corpus". The Flowering Thorn: International Ballad Studies. University Press of Colorado. p. 153. doi:10.2307/j.ctt46nrm0.14. ISBN 978-0-87421-568-7. JSTOR j.ctt46nrm0.14.
- MacLean, Amanda (2011). "The Sad Fate and Splendid Career of the Trumpeter of Fyvie". Folk Music Journal. 10 (1): 89–101. JSTOR 23208182.
- MacLean, Amanda (2023). "Dropping Stones and Opening Doors on to 'Mill o' Tifty's Annie'". Folk Music Journal. 12 (3): 78–85.
- Sharp, Sarah Elizabeth (2016). Digging up the kirkyard: death, readership and nation in the writings of the Blackwood's group 1817-1839 (PDF) (Ph.D. thesis).
- Strong, Martin Charles (2002). The Great Scots Musicography: The Complete Guide to Scotland's Music Makers. Mercat Press. ISBN 9781841830414.
- Thompson, Dave (2023). An Evolving Tradition: The Child Ballads in Modern Folk and Rock Music. Rowman & Littlefield. ISBN 9781493068241.
- Wollstadt, Lynn (2002). "Controlling Women: "Reading Gender in the Ballads Scottish Women Sang"". Western Folklore. 61 (3/4): 295–317. doi:10.2307/1500424. JSTOR 1500424.
