= White: Gypsy or Irish Traveller =

Ethnicity classification used in the 2011 United Kingdom Census

- Population pyramid of White: Gypsy or Irish Travellers in 2021

Total population
- United Kingdom: 73,709 – 0.1% (2021/22 Census); England: 64,205 – 0.1% (2021); Scotland: 3,343 – 0.06% (2022); Wales: 3,552 – 0.1% (2021); Northern Ireland: 2,609 – 0.1% (2021) (Note: (including 'White' people, as defined by NISRA, in the 'Irish Traveller' ethnic group))

Regions with significant populations
- Kent; Surrey; Hampshire; Essex; Cambridgeshire; Worcestershire; Hertfordshire; Norfolk

Languages
- Angloromani · British English · Hiberno-English · Shelta; Beurla Reagaird · Irish · Welsh Romani

Religion
- Predominantly Christianity; Note

White: Gypsy or Irish Traveller is an ethnicity classification used in the 2011 United Kingdom Census. In the 2011 census, the White: Gypsy or Irish Traveller population was 63,193 or about 0.1 percent of the total population of the country. The ethnicity category may encompass populace from the distinct ethnic groups of Romanichal Travellers or Irish Travellers, and their respective related subgroupings, who identify as, or are perceived to be, white people in the United Kingdom.

Within Britain, England and Wales statistics (which make up around 95 per cent of the UK's census data) designate the category as the article describes. The Scottish census lists the category, in a slightly different form, as 'White: Gypsy/Traveller'.

In Northern Ireland, where only the term 'White' is used in ethnic classification, 'Irish Traveller' is listed as a separate "ethnic group" to 'White'. The Northern Ireland Statistics and Research Agency, however, does treat 'Irish Traveller' as a subgroup of 'White' in census data analysis.

== Census classifications ==
Along with 'Arab', the category of 'White: Gypsy or Irish Traveller' was introduced at the 2011 census.

=== Population and distribution ===
The National Institute for Health Research estimated that there were 54,895 people in the "White: Gypsy or Irish Traveller" group in England, although this was clarified as a likely underestimation. The Welsh Government has identified 2,785 of the group living in Wales. In England and Wales together, this has been recorded at 57,680.

In 2006, according to the Office of the Deputy Prime Minister of the United Kingdom, there were between 300,000 and 400,000 estimated to be in the 'White: Gypsy or Irish Traveller' grouping, which is around, at least, 250,000 more than was recorded at the 2011 census.

2011 census data in England and Wales showed that the highest population by local district proportion was in Basildon, Essex; Ashford, Kent; Maidstone, Kent; Swale, Kent; and Fenland, Cambridgeshire – in all of these forming 0.5% of the populations each. By county, Kent has the highest population, while by region, South East England (which is also where Kent is located within) has the highest. Other counties with significant populations are Surrey, Essex and Hampshire. London has the second highest population by region, with 8,196 of the group born here. This is closely followed by the East of England, numbering 8,165.

The Scottish Government has listed around 4,000 people living in Scotland of the "ethnic group" category of ‘White: Gypsy/Traveller’. The specific number provided by the National Records of Scotland for the 2011 census was 4,200. The organisation also has suggested that this is a significant undercounting, with estimates of up to 20,000 of the group being resident in Scotland. The highest density of the group were resident in the council areas: Perth & Kinross, Glasgow City and City of Edinburgh.

== Demographics ==
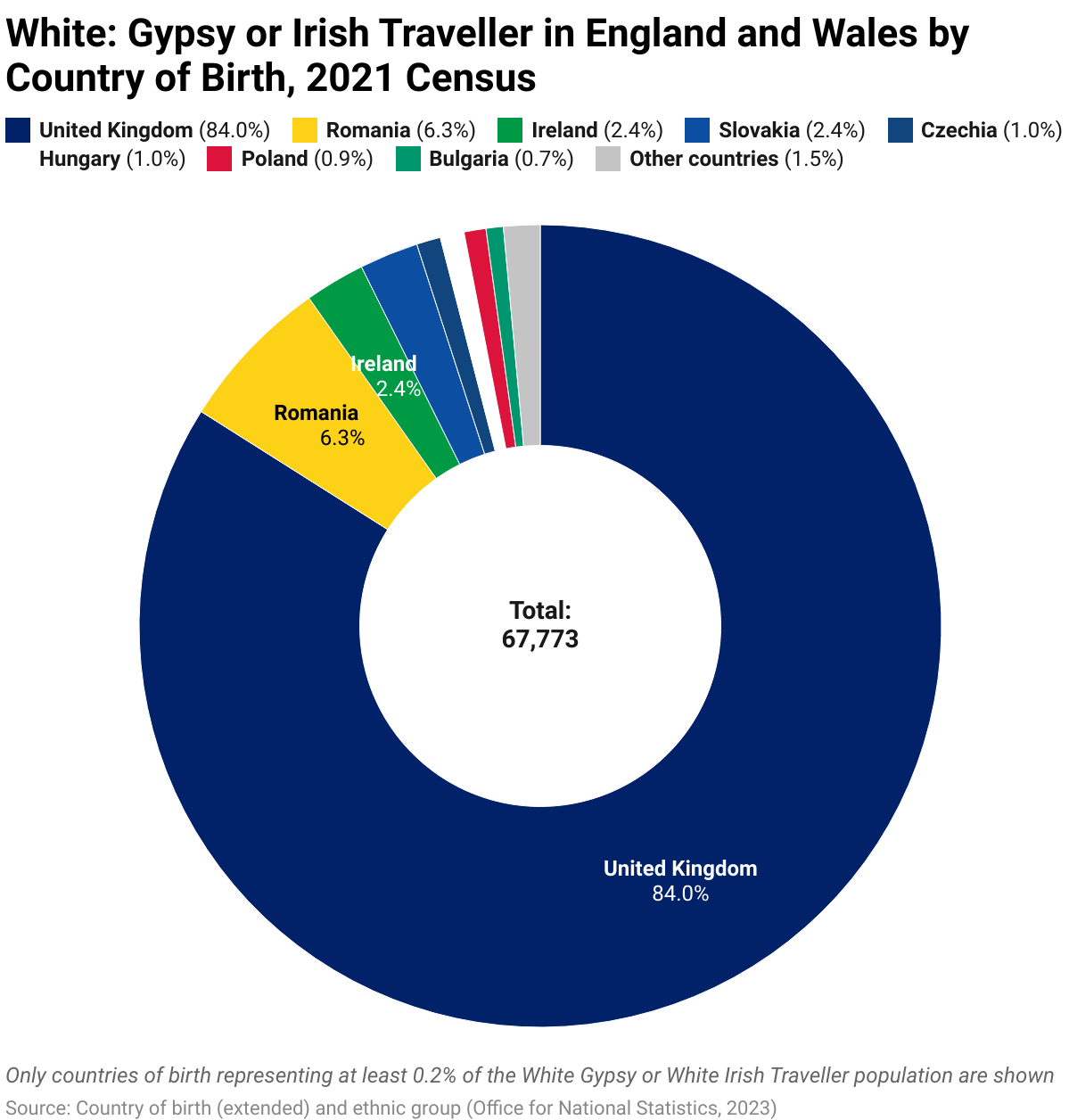
Country of birth (2021 census, England and Wales)

=== Religion ===
| Religion | England and Wales | | | |
| Religion | 2011 | | 2021 | |
| Religion | Number | % | Number | % |
|---|---|---|---|---|
| Christianity | 37,001 | 64.1% | 42,570 | 62.8% |
| No religion | 13,109 | 22.7% | 19,054 | 28.1% |
| Islam | 378 | 0.7% | 455 | 0.7% |
| Buddhism | 421 | 0.7% | 342 | 0.5% |
| Judaism | 247 | 0.4% | 181 | 0.3% |
| Hinduism | 102 | 0.2% | 89 | 0.1% |
| Sikhism | 96 | 0.2% | 85 | 0.1% |
| Other religions | 798 | 1.4% | 705 | 1.0% |
| Not Stated | 5,528 | 9.6% | 4,286 | 6.3% |
| Total | 57,680 | 100% | 67,767 | 100% |

== Social and health issues ==
=== Health ===
According to a 2013 Centre on Dynamics of Ethnicity study, the 2011 census showed that the White: Gypsy or Irish Traveller group suffered from poor health. Both men and women from the group had twice the rates of long-term and limiting illnesses as White British people.

=== Housing ===
Two thirds of the group were estimated to be living in permanent housing in the UK. The White: Gypsy or Irish Traveller group was found to be the most likely to experience overcrowding in households in the 2011 census.

=== Other ===
In the 2014/2015 school year in Scotland, the exclusion rates of pupils from the 'White: Gypsy / Traveller' category were 75 in 1000, compared with 29 in every 1000 of pupils from the White Scottish grouping. According to the Welsh Government, the "White: Gypsy or Irish Traveller ethnic group" provided the highest proportions of unpaid care per capita in both England and Wales.

== See also ==
- Ethnic groups in the United Kingdom
- Demographics of the United Kingdom
- Demographics of Scotland
- List of United Kingdom censuses
- Classification of ethnicity in the United Kingdom
- National Statistics Socio-economic Classification
- Genetic history of the British Isles
- Historical immigration to Great Britain
- List of English districts and their ethnic composition
- White Irish
