= Peter Kennedy (folklorist) =

English musicologist

Peter Douglas Kennedy (18 November 1922 – 10 June 2006) was an influential English folklorist and folk song collector throughout the 1950s, 1960s and 1970s.

== Family and upbringing ==
Peter Kennedy was born and raised in London, and educated at Leighton Park, a Quaker school in Reading.

Peter's father, Douglas Kennedy (1893–1988), was EFDSS director after Cecil Sharp, and his mother Helen, was founding secretary of EFDSS and the sister of Cecil Sharp's amanuensis Maud Karpeles. His great-aunt was Marjory Kennedy-Fraser, folk song collector and author, and his great-grandfather, David Kennedy, was a famous Scottish singer.

== Career ==
Kennedy helped to film the world's first international folk dance festival in London in 1935 at the age of 13, and joined the EFDSS staff in 1948 at the age of 26.

Peter helped the growing popularity of English folk dance with recordings and books such as The Fiddlers Tune Book.

Kennedy was one of the presenters of the BBC folk music programme As I Roved Out, broadcast during the 1950s, which featured collecting recordings of traditional singers. Together with Alan Lomax, and assisted by Shirley Collins, he went on to edit "Folk Songs of Britain", a ten volume series of sound recordings, originally published in the USA on Caedmon Records from 1961 onwards, and later in the UK on Topic Records in 1968.

As well as collecting hundreds of authentic folk performances, he recorded emerging folk revival singers such as Ewan MacColl and A. L. Lloyd.

Some of the titles in this series were re-issued on CD by Rounder in 2000. A curious, and frequently criticised feature of these albums is that songs are often presented by splicing together recordings of two or more singers. Kennedy also founded the record label Folktrax, issuing his own recordings on cassette, and later CD. His 1975 publication Folk Songs of Britain and Ireland, accompanies by a series of tapes (later CDs), gave both the tunes and the words to 360 traditional songs, as well as brief notes about their origins, and references to other collected versions. Eventually, he established a catalogue of more than 450 CDs and DVDs.

Kennedy's work raised some controversy amongst the folk music community. After his death, the magazine Musical Traditions drew up a list of opinions for and against Peter's legacy. The number of items against him is 28; in favour, 8. For some people he appeared exploitative and difficult to deal with, but his scholarship was rarely questioned.

He received a lifetime achievement award at the 2003 Goderich Celtic festival in Ontario, and the EFDSS Gold Badge in 2005.

He died in 2006 at the age of 83.

== Peter Kennedy Archive ==
The British Library holds some photographs and a small portion of the field recordings from the Peter Kennedy archive, and these are publicly accessible. Topic Records have issued 6 albums of his recordings in their The Voice of the People series of compilations and 3 albums partially selected from his recordings including "It was mighty!" The Early Days of Irish Music in London.

== Folk musicians recorded by Kennedy ==
England and Wales

- Bob & Ron Copper
- Pop Maynard
- Ned Pearson
- Cyril Poacher
- Bob Roberts
- Herbert Smith (fiddler)
- Phoebe Smith
- Scan Tester
- Bill Westaway

Scotland and Ireland

- Lizzie Higgins
- Jimmy MacBeath
- John MacDonald
- Sarah Makem
- The McPeake Family of Belfast
- Jeannie Robertson
- Belle Stewart
- Paddy Tunney
