= Scottish music (1950–1959) =

== Births and deaths ==
=== Births ===
- Kirsty MacColl (1959–2000)

== Recordings ==
- 1953 "The Queen Among The Heather" (Jeannie Robertson)
