= Doc Rowe =

British folklorist, author and film-maker

David "Doc" Rowe (born 8 December 1944) is a folklorist, author and film-maker who lives and works in the United Kingdom. A graduate of Hornsey College of Arts, he is a prominent lecturer on and advocate for folk traditions and folk music.

Described by The Guardian as "Britain’s greatest folklorist", over a 50-year career Rowe has built a substantial collection of photographs and audio-visual material, cited by the British Library as an "internationally significant archive of British folk life, lore and cultural tradition".

== Early life and education ==
David R. Rowe was born in Torquay, Devon in December 1944. He attended Torquay Boys Grammar School, followed by Newton Abbot College of Art, Leeds Regional College of Art and Hornsey College of Art where he gained a first degree in fine art, and finished a post-graduate year at the University of London in 1971.

== Career ==
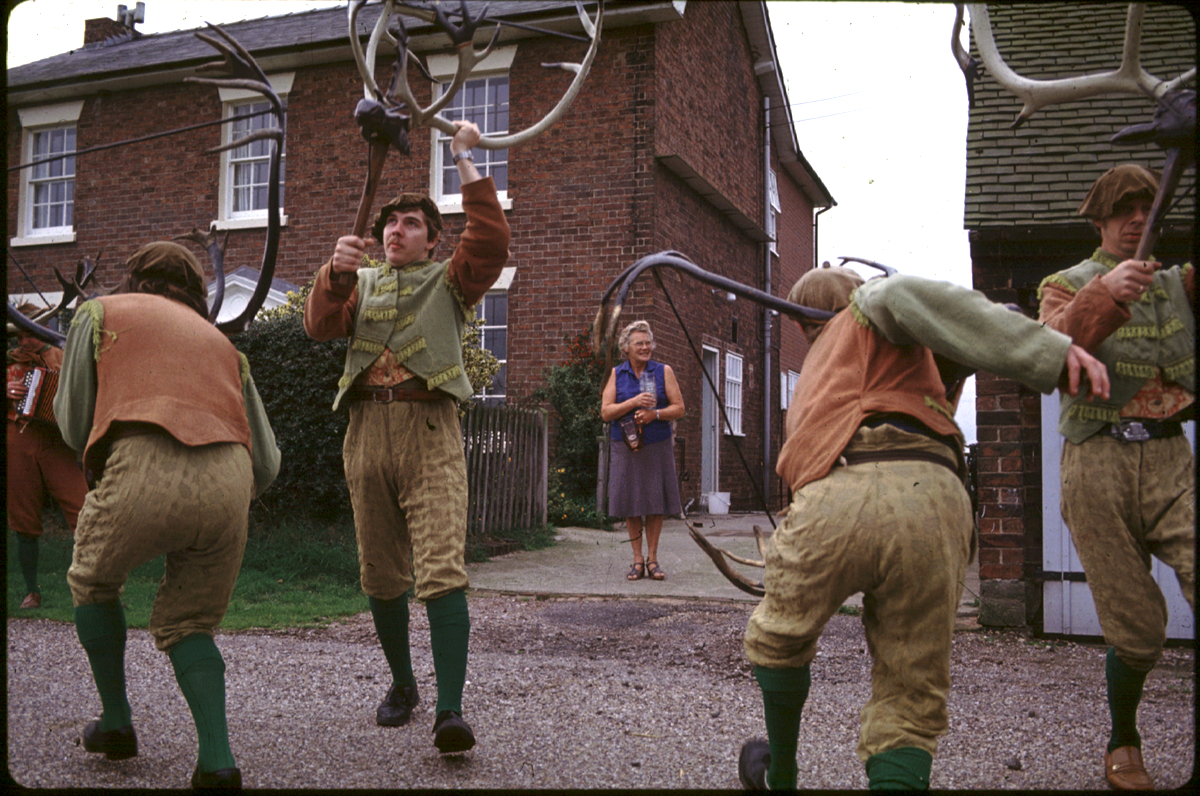
Abbots Bromley Horn Dance 1982, photographed by Doc Rowe

Since the 1960s, Rowe has focused on collecting and celebrating folklore, oral history and the vernacular music and traditions of Britain and Ireland. In 2002, Rowe was awarded an honorary doctorate in music from the University of Sheffield, and in 2005 received the English Folk Dance and Song Society's Gold Badge for his documentation of traditional song and dance.

Rowe has been a committee member of the Oral History Society; the Traditional Song Forum; and the Folklore Society, which in 2007 presented Rowe with its Coote Lake Medal for his research into folklore.

Rowe developed an early interest in traditional song, stemming largely from 1950s BBC radio broadcasts. Performing on the folk club circuit as a singer from 1963, he met BBC producer Charles Parker, who – with Ewan MacColl and Peggy Seeger – was working on the BBC Radio Ballads (1957–64); Rowe has since cited Parker and the "Ballads" as amongst his strongest abiding influences.

Rowe went on to work with Parker, MacColl and Seeger on a variety of folk-song and drama related projects including Philip Donnellan's TV versions of the Radio Ballads (1972) and Passage West (1975), as well as being a joint editorial advisor on The Other Music (BBC2, 1981).

An equally formative experience for Rowe was a 1963 visit to the May Day 'Obby 'Oss festival in the Cornish town of Padstow; he has returned every year since to continuously document the tradition. It also triggered a wider focus on seasonal events and popular cultural traditions. Over the subsequent decades, Rowe has attended and recorded a wide range of Britain's annual calendar customs.

Rowe served as a consultant and writer on Channel 4's short 1984 documentary series, Future of Things Past. The programmes explored the community purpose of 18 different British calendar customs.

Since the early 1990s, Rowe has focused on his own archive which is currently housed in Whitby, North Yorkshire. Alongside this, Rowe regularly lectures on folklore, customs and traditions nationally and internationally, and also continues to collaborate on new projects across broadcasting, photography and the arts.

In 2006, Rowe was the focus of a BBC Radio 4 Archive Hour, Same Time, Same Place, Next Year, written and presented by the then-Library Director of the English Folk Dance and Song Society, Malcolm Taylor.

== The Doc Rowe archive ==
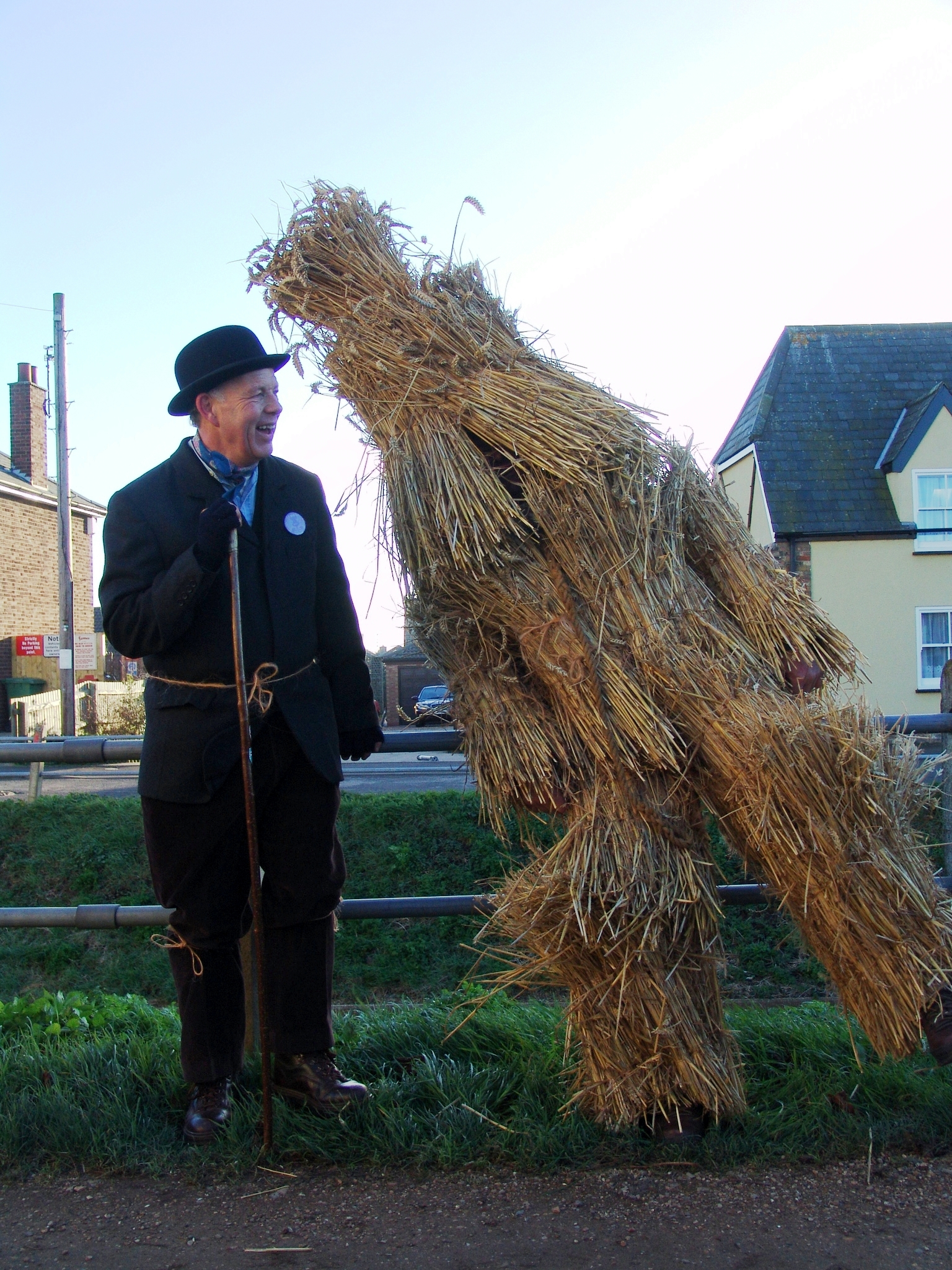
Whittlesea Straw Bear, 2018, photographed by Doc Rowe

Since the 1960s, Rowe has amassed a substantial private collection of his own photographs, film and audio recordings of British folk customs and folk music, housed independently in Whitby since 2010. The collection is recognised as being of international significance, and at present stands at over 400,000 photos and transparencies, over 3,000 hours of moving image in various formats, over 12,000 hours of audio recordings, plus a large volume of papers, books, press cuttings and other ephemera.

As of 2021, the work of housing and preserving the archive has been largely self-funded by Rowe, supported by sales of photographic work, lecturing and broadcasting. The collection has additionally been financially supported by a Support Group established in the early 2000s by friends and colleagues.

Rowe's own recordings have been substantially used for multiple releases, including the British Film Institute’s ‘Here’s a Health to the Barley Mow’ DVD compilation of British folk customs (2011); and ‘You Lazy Lot of Bone-Shakers’ (2007), a CD anthology of song and dance tunes from seasonal events in England, released as part of Topic Records’ The Voice of the People series.

Rowe's recordings also include two releases of Padstow Christmas carols – Rouse Rouse (Veteran Tapes, 1996); and Harky Harky (ReZound, 2000).

Rowe also provided the recordings for two releases by the Scottish singer and story-teller Sheila Stewart, daughter of Belle Stewart, of the noted family of singing travellers, the Stewarts of Blair – The Heart of the Tradition (Topic Records, 1999), and also ...And Time Goes On: Sheila Stewart, Storyteller (Offspring, 2000).

== Exhibitions ==
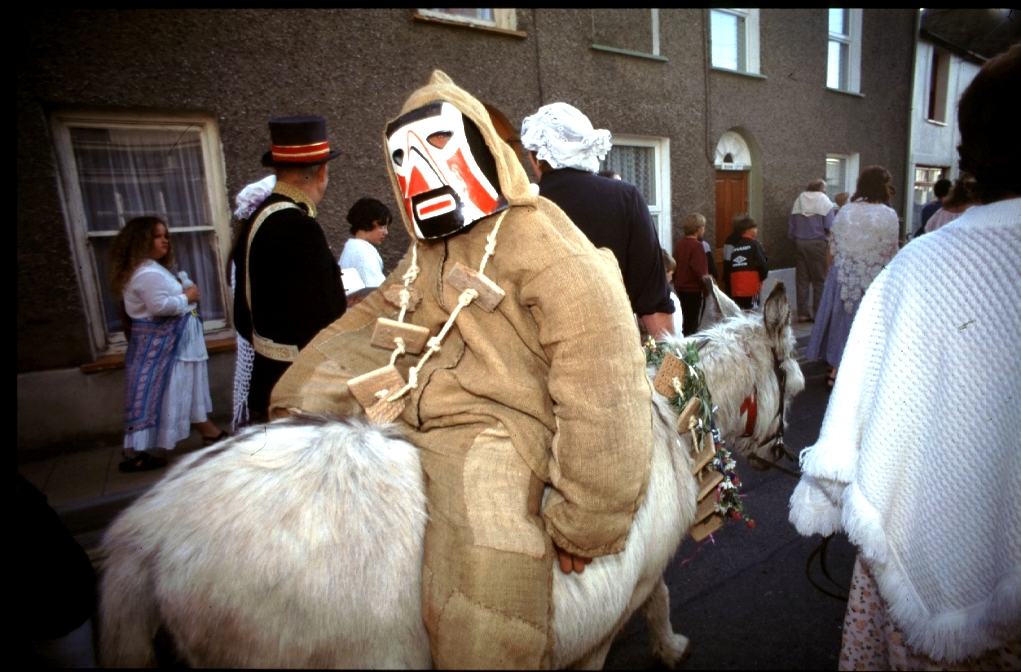
Hunting the Earl of Rone, 2014, photographed by Doc Rowe

Rowe is a frequent collaborator with artists and curators in the shaping of exhibitions that draw from his archive.

In 2000, his photographs were included by prominent British contemporary artists Jeremy Deller and Alan Kane in Intelligence – New British Art 2000 (Tate Britain, London). Building upon this, in 2005 he worked again with Deller and Kane, on their British Council-supported Folk Archive project – which as of 2020 continues to tour the UK, and internationally.

In 2012, the Museum of British Folklore, in partnership with the Museum of East Anglian Life in Stowmarket, Suffolk, staged an exhibition, The Doc Rowe Archive: 50 years of Focusing on Folk, drawing upon Rowe's extensive collection.

Rowe's photographs were also included in the 2014 Tate Britain exhibition British Folk Art.

In 2019, Rowe collaborated with photographer Bryony Bainbridge, printmaker and poet Natalie Reid, and multimedia artist Anna F. C. Smith on Lore and the Living Archive, an Arts Council England-funded exhibition that toured the UK, with residencies at Cecil Sharp House, the London headquarters of the English Folk Dance and Song Society; Touchstones museum in Rochdale, Greater Manchester; and the Pannett Art Gallery, Whitby, North Yorkshire.

== Publications ==
- We'll Call Once More Unto Your House [Padstow Eko 1982]
- Comes the Morris Dancer In [Morris Ring 1984] ISBN 0-9503402-2-7
- Room, Room, Ladies and Gentlemen: An Introduction to the English Mummers' Play (ed. Malcolm Taylor & Doc Rowe) [EFDSS in association with the Folklore Society, 2002] ISBN 0-85418-185-7
- A series of educational resource packs [EFDSS 1993–1995]
- May: an education resource pack for the Summer term on British traditions [EFDSS 1993] ISBN 0-85418-160-1
- Midwinter (Education Resource Pack No 2) [EFDSS 1994] ISBN 0-85418-161-X
- Plough Monday to Hocktide: Education Resource Pack No 3 for the Spring Term on British Traditions [EFDSS 1995] ISBN 0-85418-170-9
- May Day: The Coming of Spring [English Heritage 2006] ISBN 1-85074-983-3
- Have You Ever Seen a Penguin Come to Tea? [EFDSS, 2008]
- Down by the Riverside [EFDSS, 2008]
