= Tifty =

Tifty may refer to:

- Tifty, character in The Twelve (novel)
- Tifty, Aberdeenshire, Scotland
