= Philip Donnellan =

English documentary film-maker (1924-1999)

Philip Donnellan (9 February 1924 – 15 February 1999) was an English documentary film-maker.

Described in his Guardian obituary as "one of the greatest of all documentarists", Donnellan worked with the BBC for over four decades, producing around 80 documentary films and programmes, most reflecting working-class lives.

The son of an Irish headmaster, Donnellan grew up in Surrey. After World War II, in which he fought in Burma, he became a journalist, then a BBC radio announcer. He began interviewing working people, such as the fisherman Sam Larner, who had a vast repertoire of traditional songs. The two programmes Donnellan made for the BBC of these songs introduced them to Ewan MacColl.

From there, Donnellan diversified into television, focusing on working people; his first film was Joe The Chainsmith, and his 1962 Private Faces was a portrait of a Durham miner. He also filmed public figures such as Konrad Adenauer, Jawaharlal Nehru and Charles de Gaulle; these were well received but he found them less satisfying. His continual addressing of political issues led to many editorial disputes, but Donnellan kept his film-making base at Pebble Mill in Birmingham, which meant he could present his films to the BBC controllers as faits accomplis.

Donnellan continued to be entertaining and provocative: Where Do We Go From Here? dealt with the question of the 'Gypsy menace' (travelling people), Gone for a Soldier (1980) was a 105-minute montage of ordinary soldiers' diaries and letters, and he made film versions of the radio ballads Shoals of Herring (1972), The Fight Game and The Big Hewer (1973) with MacColl and Peggy Seeger.

Philip worked frequently with Ewan MacColl, Peggy Seeger and Charles Parker - all three who had created the original Radio Ballads (1958-63). An early venture had been a series of six programmes Landmarks (1964) looking at life from cradle to the grave. BD8: The Enclosed World of the Blind (1967) and Stories and Songs of A Scots Family Group (1978) also featured the singers and folk song

Additionally, The Other Music (1981) chronicled the folk song revival 1945-1981 from its roots in the British folk tradition. This, alongside The Passage West, which explored the experience of Irish emigres, were made alongside the folklorist Doc Rowe. Philip also became executive producer in a four part series The Good Old Way (1983) compiled and edited by Andrew Johnston from footage originally shot for The Other Music.

He also co-founded and chaired the West Midlands Gypsy Liaison Group.
