= Sandy Reid =

Sandy Reid (born 1958) is the Scottish author of the autobiographical book, Never To Return.

Reid and his sister were taken from their parents, who were Scottish Traveller, when Reid was only a year old. The book describes how his experience in foster care at a young age and how this experience isolated him from his family, his heritage, his identity and his transient way of life. In 2002, Reid successfully won a claim for compensation for the suffering he had endured.

The book was nominated for the Orwell Prize in 2008.

== Bibliography ==
- Never To Return (Black and White Publishing 2008 ISBN 978-1-84502-223-5) (Mehta publishing India 2011 ISBN 978-81-8498-127-8)
