= Sheila Stewart =

- Born: Sheila Stewart; 7 July 1937
- Origin: Blairgowrie, Scotland
- Died: 9 December 2014 (aged 77)
- Genres: Traditional folk
- Occupations: Singer, author

Sheila Stewart MBE (7 July 1937 – 9 December 2014) was a Scottish traditional singer, storyteller, and author. She inherited a large number of traditional songs from older family members, including her mother Belle Stewart.

== Biography ==
Born in a former stable of a Blairgowrie hotel to Belle Stewart, a Traveller singer and poet, and Alex, a bagpiper, Stewart was chosen as a child by her uncle to carry on her family's stories and songs. Performing at family cèilidhs for ten-shilling notes led to more public performances in village halls, although the family collectively thought performing was "[producing] a natural function". In 1954, journalist Maurice Fleming and, later, folklorist Hamish Henderson arrived in town, looking for singers of traditional songs. Over the next twenty years, the Stewarts of Blair became a folk attraction on both sides of the Atlantic Ocean.

In 1976, Stewart was asked by United States President Gerald Ford to sing in the White House for the bicentennial celebrations. On 1 June 1982, she was chosen to represent the travelling people during Pope John Paul II's visit to Scotland. She sang Ewan MacColl's "Moving On Song".

In addition to writing her mother's biography, Queen Amang the Heather – The Life of Belle Stewart, in 2006, she published a series of booklets, titled An Ancient Oral Culture, which led to her autobiography, A Traveller's Life, in 2011.

The family were filmed by Philip Donnellan for Stories and Songs of a Scots Family Group which was broadcast on BBC2 [24 September 1980]. Ewan MacColl and Peggy Seeger published Till Doomsday in the Afternoon: Folklore of a Family of Scots Travellers, the Stewarts of Blairgowrie in 1986.

Until her death, Stewart shared her family's songs and stories with audiences at home and abroad. She lectured on travellers' culture at Princeton and Harvard universities and sat on the Secretary of State for Scotland's advisory committee on travellers.

A solo CD From the Heart of the Tradition was issued by Topic Records in 2000 recorded by Doc Rowe at her home in 1999; additionally, his recordings of Sheila's storytelling was issued as '… And Time Goes On ... Songs and Stories: Sheila Stewart' on Offspring Records.

Stewart died on 9 December 2014, in Dundee, at the age of 77. She was preceded in death by her husband, Ian McGregor who died in 1977. Sheila and Ian had four children.

== Songs ==
She was recorded singing several of the old Child Ballads which she inherited from older family members, many of which are available on the Tobar an Dualchais website, such as Andrew Lammie, The Twa Brithers, The Twa Sisters, Young Beichan, Dowie Dens o Yarrow.

== Discography and film ==
- The Stewarts of Blair. Traditional ballads, songs and pipe music by one of Scotland's great singing families Topic Records 12T138 (LP, UK, 1965)
- The Travelling Stewarts The Stewart Family and other Traveller Families Topic Records 12T179 (LP, UK, 1968)
- The Stewarts of Blair Belle, Sheila and Cathy Stewart Lismor LIFL 7010 (LP, UK, 1985)
- From the Heart of the Tradition Sheila Stewart Topic Records TSCD515 (CD, UK, 2000)
- … And Time Goes On …Songs and Stories Sheila Stewart Offspring Records OFFCD00101 (CD, UK, 2000)

== Awards and honours ==
In the 2006 Birthday Honours Stewart was made an MBE for her services to Scottish traditional music.

In 2016 Stewart was featured in the documentary 'Where You're Meant To Be' along with Aidan Moffat. The film features Moffat travelling around Scotland to perform his reinterpretations of traditional Scottish folk songs. Stewart is critical of Moffat's versions of the songs, though ultimately appears on stage with Moffat at a performance at Glasgow Barrowlands.
