= Belle Stewart =

- Born: Isobella McGregor; 18 July 1906; Caputh, Blairgowrie
- Died: 4 September 1997 (aged 91) Blairgowrie
- Genres: Scottish folk music
- Occupation: Singer
- Instrument: Vocals

Belle Stewart, born Isobella McGregor, (18 July 1906 – 4 September 1997) was a Scottish Traveller traditional singer. Her biography, Queen Amang the Heather: the Life of Belle Stewart, was written by her daughter, Sheila Stewart, and published in 2006. She was awarded the British Empire Medal (BEM) in 1981 for "outstanding contribution to Scottish traditional music".

== Early years ==
Isobella McGregor was born on the banks of the River Tay at Caputh, near Blairgowrie, into a family of Highland Scottish Travellers, who lived in bow-tents (similar to dome tents). Sheila Stewart corrects the frequently cited birthdate of 17 July 1906 to the 18th. As a result of their life-style, the family received much insult and abuse. Belle's father died when she was only 9 months old. Afraid that social workers might take her children from her, her mother stopped travelling and settled in Perthshire. The McGregor family tried to teach Belle how to read palms (fortune telling), but she didn't take to this. The family frequently went to Northern Ireland to do pearl-fishing. In the evenings they gathered at ceilidhs to exchange folk songs. Stewart learnt songs from her brothers, who had themselves learnt them from her father.

== Marriage ==
Belle's version of "If I Was a Blackbird" inspired Alec Stewart, a piper, to propose to her. They married in secret on 17 August 1925 at Ballymoney in Northern Ireland.

Alec's father Jock Stewart (1869–1954) had been a champion piper, supposedly the subject of the popular Scots and Irish drinking-song "Jock Stewart, A Man You Don't Meet Every Day". Jock's father, "Big Jimmy" Stewart, also a champion piper, allegedly died when beaten to death by a group of Irishmen he met on his way home from busking in the Pitlochry area, because he refused to play a tune they requested. Alec's mother, Nancy Campbell, reputedly had both a grandfather (Andy Campbell) and a grandmother sentenced to death by hanging in the 18th century for the crime of travelling.

Belle Stewart and her daughter Sheila berry picking in Strathmore.

The couple had five children who died as babies, and Sheila, Cathie, Andy and John who survived, and an adopted daughter, Rena. The family made their living by selling scrap metal and by pearl fishing.

Alec Stewart was conscripted into the army. His Captain also came from Blairgowrie. The Captain was wounded in action and Alec carried him to the Red Cross camp. When the Captain learned who had saved his life, he said that he would have preferred to die rather than to owe his life to a "Tink". Alec and Belle wrote letters in the Traveller cant known as Beurla-reagaird. The British Army postal censors could not understand it, and ordered them to stop.

== Cultural milieu ==
When the Stewarts of Blairgowrie went to the Sidmouth Festival in Devon they encountered New Age travellers for the first time. Belle Stewart noticed how dirty the New Agers were. They said they were travellers but Stewart replied "No, you're not. We are." The New Age Travellers said "But you're dressed too fine to be travellers." The photographs in Sheila Stewart's book show how much care the Stewarts took with personal appearance. At festivals the whole family wore tartan kilts and the pipers among them wore full regalia.

Stewart's repertoire of folk tales frequently refer to the supernatural, including changelings. A collection of her stories was published as The King o' the Black Art in 1987.

When Alec Stewart died, the Church of Scotland minister at Blairgowrie refused to allow a funeral service in his church, because Alec had been a Traveller. A Dundee minister offered them a service in his church.

== Celebrity ==
While John Stewart worked on a building site in Hatfield, a friend of Ewan MacColl visited. The following week Ewan MacColl visited the Stewart family. Hamish Henderson and the School of Scottish Studies recorded the family's music and folk tales. Soon the younger members of the family made recordings of ballads in London. A few months later the whole family received invitations to perform at MacColl's "Singers' Club" in London. In March 1954 Hamish Henderson invited the Traveller family to do a concert in Edinburgh alongside "Auld Galoot" (Davie Stewart), Jeannie Robertson and Jimmy MacBeath. Later in 1954 Douglas Kennedy and Peter Kennedy visited them and made recordings. This began their career performing in folk clubs.

Stewart's most famous composition is "The Berry Fields o' Blair".

In the 1960s Alec Stewart made his living in the summer months by playing bagpipes to tourists in Glen Coe, Oban and Loch Ness. Belle knew all the songs and decided which of the other members of the family could sing which songs. In 1965 the family recorded an album, The Stewarts of Blair. "The Overgate", a folksong with some similarities to "Seventeen Come Sunday" has particular associations with the Robertson / Higgins / Stewart families of Travellers. Belle recorded it in 1976.

In about 1970 the family spent a month performing in America. They made several appearances at the Edinburgh Folk Festival and in folk clubs around the UK. Ewan MacColl featured them in a Radio Ballad. Ewan MacColl and Peggy Seeger also compiled a collection of the folklore of Belle and other members of her family, called 'Till Doomsday in the Afternoon. A BBC programme about the family was shown in 1980. After the death of Alec they continued to tour, and appeared at a folk festival in Bologna in 1980 and at Lake Como in 1980, with Ian taking the place of chief piper.

Stewart's great-nephew Andy M. Stewart became the frontman of the Scottish folk band Silly Wizard, who recorded their interpretation of Belle Stewart's version of "If I were a Blackbird" in 1981.

== Awards and recognition ==
Stewart was awarded the British Empire Medal in 1981 for "an outstanding contribution to Scottish traditional music". In 1986 she was honorary president of the Blairgowrie Folk Festival, where she also performed. In the same year another television programme about her was broadcast. In 1996 a series of three programmes about the family were broadcast on BBC Radio 2. Another programme was made for Grampian Television in 1996.

Stewart judged competitions for the Traditional Music and Song Association. She gave lectures on the traditions of Scotland's Traveller people at American universities.

Stewart died aged 91 in 1997.

== Discography ==
- The Stewarts of Blair (1965) Topic 12T138
- The Travelling Stewarts (1968) Topic 12T179
- Queen Among the Heather (1977) Topic 12TS307
- The Stewarts of Blair (1986) Lismor Folk LFLP 7010

In 2009 "Queen Among the Heather" from Queen Among the Heather was included in Topic Records 70-year anniversary boxed set Three Score and Ten as track three on the fourth CD.

Anthologies:

- Back o' Benachie - Songs and Ballads from the Lowland East of Scotland (1967) Topic 12T180
- Festival at Blairgowrie (recorded 1967) Topic 12T181
- "The Voice of the People Volume 20 - There is a Man Upon the Farm (two songs - "The Overgate" and "The Berry Fields o' Blair")

== See also ==
Scottish Travellers
