= George Adolphus Storey =

English painter

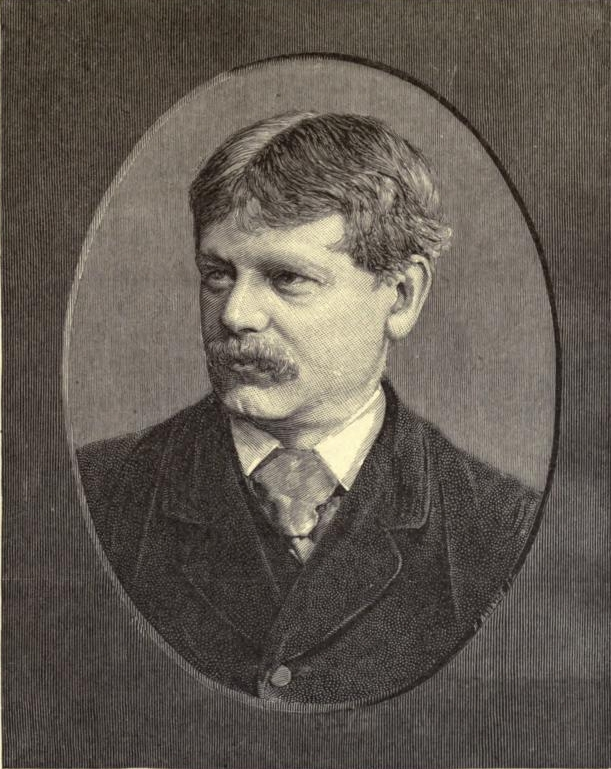

George Adolphus Storey RA (London 7 January 1834 – 29 July 1919) was an English portrait painter, genre painter and illustrator.

== Life ==
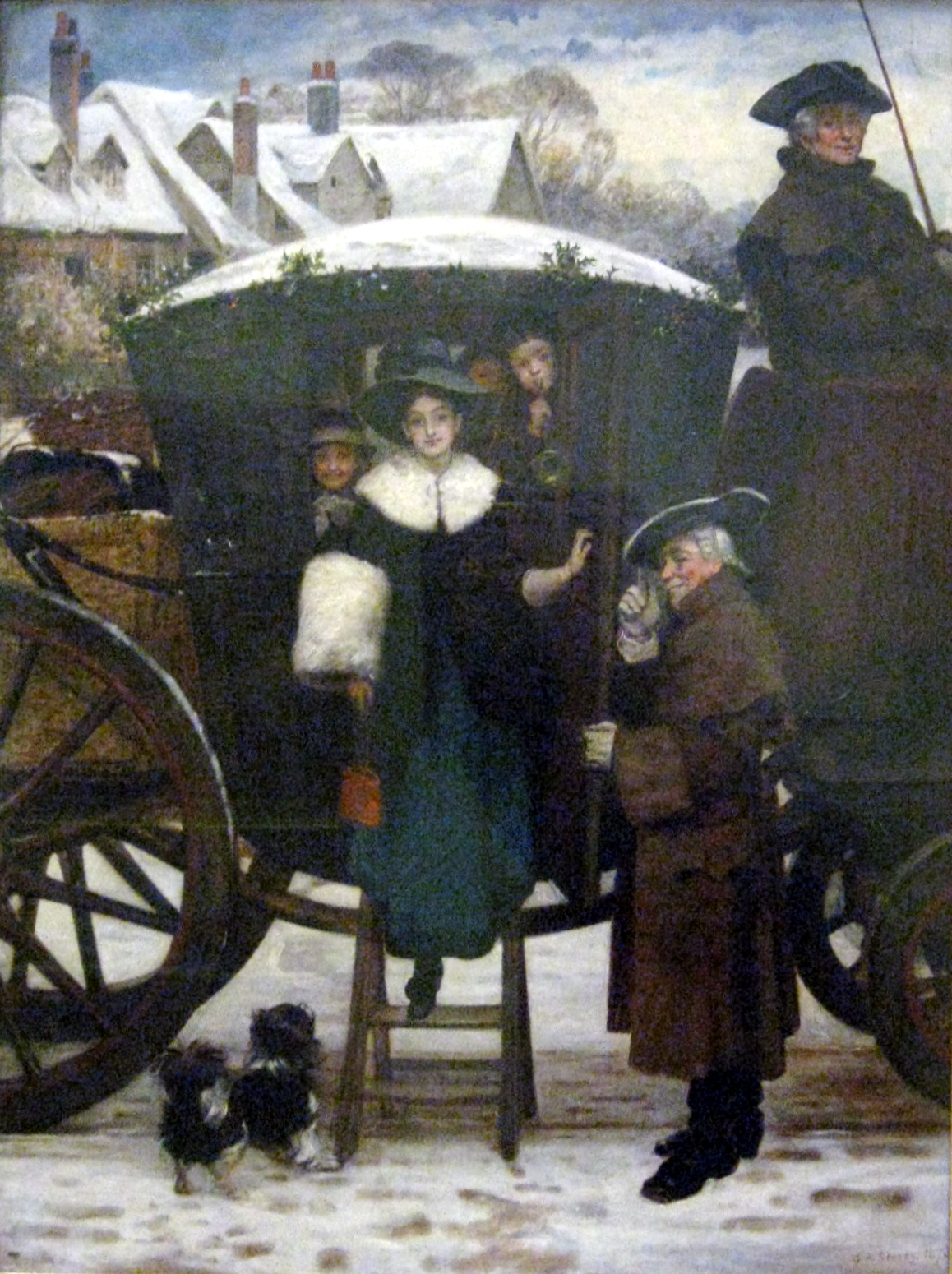
Grandmamma's Christmas Visitors (1873) oil on canvas

Storey was born in London and was privately educated attending Morden Hall School in Surrey. He continued his education in Paris and on returning to London, he worked briefly for an architect before studying under J. M. Leigh and J.L. Dulong. Though not a pupil he was also encouraged by William Behnes the sculptor, whose studio he visited. He exhibited at the Royal Academy from 1852 and studied at the Royal Academy schools from 1854. He was strongly influenced by the Pre-Raphaelites but gave them up under influence of Charles Robert Leslie. Storey worked in North London, establishing a reputation as a genre and portrait painter, and also as an illustrator. He drew elegant pictures of middle-class people for love stories and the like. Storey became ARA in 1875 and was a member of the Arts Club from 1874–95. He exhibited at the British Institution, the Royal Society of British Artists in Suffolk Street and the New Watercolour Society. He also published his autobiography in 1899, containing valuable information about the St John's Wood Clique, of which he was a member until he moved to Hampstead. From 1900, he was also the Professor of Perspective at the Royal Academy, and became RA in 1914. Storey moved in the same artistic circles as James McNeill Whistler, with whom he was well acquainted. He also recalled being patted on head by Charles Dickens and became godfather to E. H. W. Meyerstein. He is interred at the Hampstead Cemetery.

== Works in public galleries ==
- Sketch for The Bride's Burial circa 1859 Tate Gallery
- My Father 1868 Tate Gallery
- Grandmamma's Christmas Visitors 1873 Weston Park Museum, Sheffield
- My Mother 1874 Tate Gallery
- The Violinist 1886 Guildhall Art Gallery

== Bibliography ==
- Sketches from Memory, 1899
- The Theory and Practice of Perspective, 1910

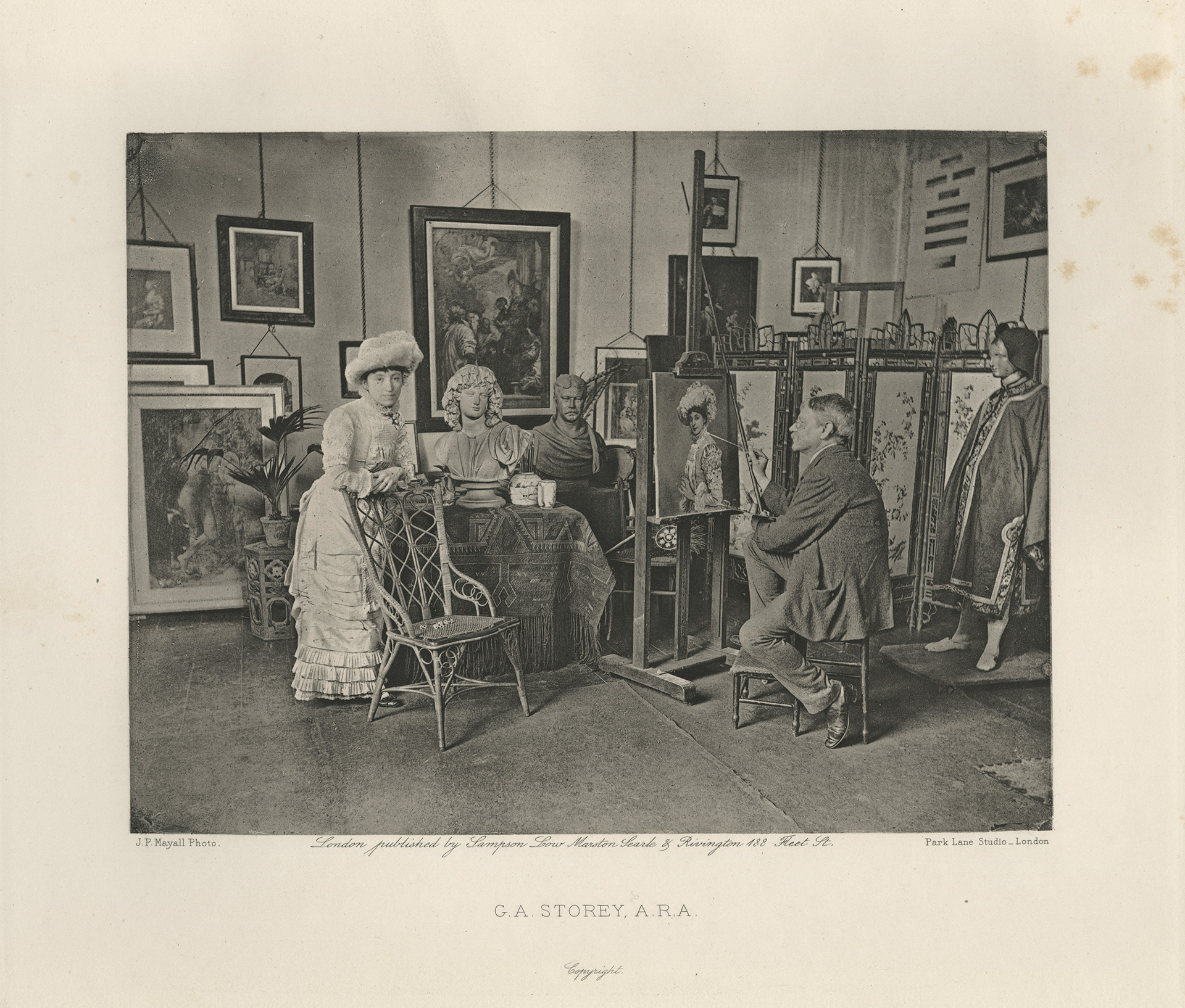
Storey by J. P. Mayall from Artists at Home, published 1884, Department of Image Collections, National Gallery of Art Library, Washington, DC
