= Amanda MacLean =

Scottish writer and singer

Amanda MacLean is a Scottish writer and singer of folk music.

== Sharps Folk Club ==
MacLean has been one of the organisers of Sharp's Folk Club for several years. She started during the COVID-19 pandemic when many of the sessions and sing arounds occurred virtually. Under her leadership, the club embraced online broadcast and recorded all of the songs sung by contributors. The club continues to run weekly.

== Other projects ==
MacLean sings with Alison Frosdick and Wendy Lanchin as part of the Rumpled Muslin folk trio.

She has also published three journal articles and a novel, each exploring the history of a traditional British folk song and its relation to real-world history:

- MacLean, Amanda (2011). "The Sad Fate and Splendid Career of the Trumpeter of Fyvie". Folk Music Journal. 10 (1): 89–101. ISSN 0531-9684. JSTOR 23208182.
- "Review of Bludie Harlaw: Realities, Myths, Ballads". Folk Music Journal. 11 (1): 81–82. 2016. ISSN 0531-9684. JSTOR 44987595.
- The Flax Flower. Lulu.com. 2015. ISBN 9781326088422.
- "Dropping Stones and Opening Doors on to 'Mill o' Tifty's Annie'". Folk Music Journal. 23 (3). 2023.
- MacLean contributed a recording of Mill O Tifty's Annie to Oli Steadman's 365 Days Of Folk project on January 19, 2024, marking the 346th anniversary of Agnes Tifty's death. The recording followed the standard text.
