= The Bride's Burial =

English ballad

The Bride's Burial is an English Broadside ballad that dates back to the beginning of the 17th century that is best known by its opening verse, "Come mourn, come mourn with me/ you loyal lovers all." Copies of "The Bride's Burial" can be found at the Huntington Library, the British Library, the Glasgow University Library, the National Library of Scotland, and the Pepys Library.

== Synopsis ==
Most often set to the tune of "The Lady's Fall" or "The Ladies' Fall," The Bride's Burial follows a husband's mourning for his recently deceased wife. He recounts their marriage, in which immediately after the vows, his wife is struck with a "griping Grief, like Pangs of Death", and upon return home announces her own death where she discards her marriage clothes for a winding sheet, or death shroud. She pleads with her new-husband to remember her in love and pray with her, as she expires. The ballad ends with a burial recognizing the Bride's virginity, and asks the reader to remember the frailty of life and love.

The ballad is most often assembled in octaves with various rhyme schemes.

== Notes ==
The tune most set to The Bride's Burial, "The Lady's Fall" shares a similar tune to the popular, "In Peascod Time."

"The Bride's Burial" has been rendered into both woodcuts—found on many of the ballads—and also a painting by George Adolphus Storey in 1859, which is now held at the Tate Gallery though not on display for the public.
