= Tifty, Aberdeenshire =

Coordinates: 57.4554°N 2.3775°W

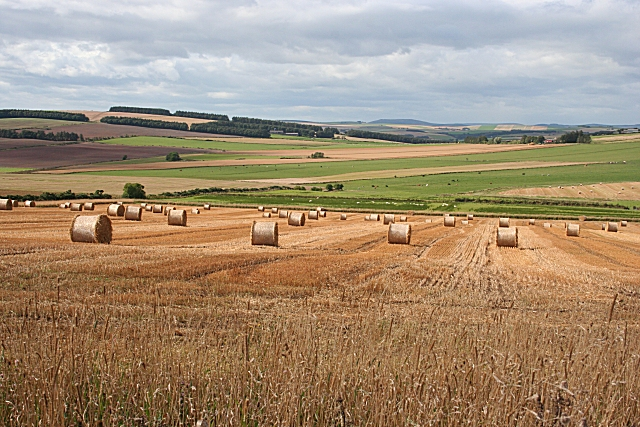
Tifty Burn

Tifty is near Turriff, Aberdeenshire, Scotland.
