= Lizzie Higgins =

Scottish singer (1929–1993)

Elizabeth Ann Youlden (née Higgins; 20 September 1929 – 20 February 1993) was a Scottish ballad singer from Aberdeenshire.

== Early life ==
Elizabeth Ann Higgins was born on 20 September 1929, in Guest Row, Aberdeen. She was the daughter of settled Travellers Donald "Donty" Higgins, a piper, and the singer Jeannie Robertson. She had a younger brother, James. In 1941, after her school was twice bombed during World War II, Higgins moved with her mother to the rural town of Banchory, where the local children bullied her for her heritage. She was so unhappy in this environment that she left school at fifteen despite the pleasure she gained from studying. She moved back to Aberdeen to fillet fish and take seasonal agricultural labouring.

== Career ==
She did not take up public singing until 1967 as she did not wish to distract public attention from her mother. "The folk scene claimed Jeannie. I [didn't] want it [to] claim me", she explained. She debuted at the Aberdeen Folk Song Festival, persuaded to sing by folk song collector Peter Hall.

== Personal life ==
She married Brian Youlden. She died from throat cancer on 20 February 1993.

== Discography ==
- The Princess of the Thistle (12-inch LP record. Topic 12 T 185. Mono. Recorded by Bill Leader, notes by Peter Hall. London, Topic Records Ltd., 1969)
- "Up and Awa' wi' the Laverock (Topic, 1975)
- "What a Voice" [12" LP] Lismor Folk Records 1985
- In Memory of Lizzie Higgins 1929 – 1993 (Musical Traditions, 2006)

== See also ==
Scottish Travellers
