= Scottish Romani and Traveller groups =

Ethnic groups

Scottish Romani and Traveller Groups are the various groups of Romani people (Gypsies) and Travellers in Scotland. Scottish Gypsy/Traveller is an official term used by the Scottish Government to encompass these groups.

== General Classification ==
- Romanichal - Romanichal that inhabit parts of Scotland. Their main endonyms today are Gypsies, Romani Gypsies, Romany Gypsies or Romanies. They are also known as Border Romanies or Border Gypsies in Scotland. Many Romanichal speak a para-Romani dialect known in academia as Angloromani.
- Roma - In this context referring to Romani migrants from mainland Europe, primarily Central and Eastern Europe. They speak various dialects/varieties of Romanes, including, but not limited to, those in the Vlach, non-Vlach (Balkan) and Carpathian categories.
- Scottish Highland Travellers (Indigenous Highland Travellers) - The main nomadic ethnic group historically situated in the Gaelic-speaking parts of the Scottish Highlands. They were called ceàrdannan ("craftsmen") by the Gaelic-speaking Highlanders. Scottish Highland Travellers are of indigenous origin. They speak Beurla Reagaird, a Gaelic-based language.
- Scottish Lowland Travellers (Nawkens) - Their main endonym today is Travellers. The Scottish Government terms this ethnic group Nackens. This ethnic group speaks Cant, which is a mix of Romani, Elizabethan Cant, Scots, and Scots Gaelic.
- Minkers (Irish Travellers) - Irish Travellers have had a historical presence in Scotland since at least the mid 18th century. They speak Shelta, also known as Gammon.
- Showmen Travellers (Funfair/Fairground Travellers) - Showmen Travellers are a distinct occupational group traditionally associated with travelling fairs, circuses and amusements. They are not limited to Scotland but are seen nationwide. They speak Parlyaree.

== Scottish Travellers ==
=== Origins ===
Distinct groups of Scottish travellers have unique historical records (see below). A genetic study on Scottish Traveler histories finds the nuclear and mitochondrial DNA of Highland and Lowland travellers groups are genetically distinct from settled populations, but more closely related to the settled Scottish population than any other group, including Irish Travellers and Romani (Gypsies).

=== Scottish Lowland Gypsies ===
There is written evidence for the presence of Romani people in the Scottish Lowlands as early as 1505, when – during the reign of James IV – an entry in a book kept by the Lord High Treasurer records a payment of four shillings to a Peter Ker to take a letter from the king at Hunthall, to the "King of Rowmais". Two days later, the King authorised a payment of £20 to a messenger from the "King of Rowmais". In 1530, a group of Romanies danced before the Scottish king at the Holyrood Palace and a Romani herbalist called Baptista cured the king of an ailment. However, James V sent letters to his regional officials and clergy to expel the "Egiptianes" in July 1541

Romani migration to Scotland continued during the 16th century and several groups of Romanies were accepted there after being expelled from England. (Note: Winstedt, Eric Otto (1913). Early British Gypsies. Liverpool, UK: Gypsy Lore Society. OCLC 14408598. cited in: Weyrauch (2001).) The Privy Council of Scotland made a proclamation in April 1573 ordering the "Egiptianis", who had been permitted to wander up and down the country, either to leave Scotland, or to settle in one place and take up a trade.

Records in Dundee from 1651 documented the migrations of small groups of people called "Egyptians" in the Highlands, noted to be of the same nature as the Gypsies in England. By 1612, Romani communities were recorded to exist as far north as Scalloway in the Shetland Islands. (Note: Macritchie. Scottish Gypsies. cited in Weyrauch (2001))

The Kàlo, a Romani group in Finland, maintain that their ancestors were originally a Romani group who travelled to Finland from Scotland; this is because the Kàlo and the Romanisæl of Norway and Sweden are believed to have descended from Romani who arrived in Britain in the 16th century.

Romani people in the south of Scotland enjoyed the protection of the Roslyn family and made an encampment within the Roslyn castle grounds. However, as with its neighbour England, the Scottish parliament passed an act in 1609 against Romani groups known as the “Act against the Egyptians”; which made it lawful to condemn, detain and execute Romani people.

Scotland has had a Romani population for at least 500 years; they are a distinct group from the Highland Travellers. Lowland Romani Gypsies share a common heritage with Romanichal and Kale. They enjoyed a place in Scottish society until the Reformation, when their wandering lifestyle and exotic culture brought severe persecution upon them.

Kirk Yetholm Tinklers were a regional cluster of families inhabiting the small villages of Kirk Yetholm, Town Yetholm, Kelso and Coldstream situated in the Scottish Borders. They were also called Yetholm Tinklers, Horners, Muggers and Potters.

=== Scottish Highland Travellers ===
Scottish Highland Travellers, also known as Indigenous Highland Travellers (IHT) are a nomadic ethnic group historically situated in the Highlands of Scotland. Scottish Highland Travellers believed to be indigenous.

The pejorative term Black Tinkers is applied to them. Tinkers in Gaelic-speaking areas were called cèard fiosachd ("fortune-telling tinkers"), baobh shiùbhlach ("strolling fortune-tellers) and ceàrdannan ("craftsmen") in Scottish Gaelic.

==== Origins ====
Highland Travellers share a similar heritage, although are distinct from, the Irish Travellers. As with their Irish counterparts, there are several theories regarding the origin of Scottish Highland Travellers; some that have been claimed at different times are that they are descended from the Picts, originated as excommunicated clergy, were families fleeing the Highland potato famine, or represent a population displaced by the Norman Invasion or prior socio-political disruptions.

As an indigenous group, Highland Travellers have played an essential role in the preservation of traditional Gaelic culture. It is estimated that as few as 2,000 Highland Travellers continue to lead their traditional lifestyle on the roads.

Adam Smith, the economist and philosopher, was reportedly kidnapped by Highland Travellers at a young age before quickly being freed.

==== Language ====
Scottish Highland Travellers spoke a Gaelic-based language called Beurla Reagaird. It is related to the Irish Traveller language Shelta. A lexicon can be found at the back of Timothy Neat's The Summer Walkers. It is unrelated to Beurlagair na Saor, the jargon spoken by Irish masons.

=== Scottish Lowland Travellers (Nawkens) ===
Scottish Lowland Travellers, historically called Nawkens, also known as Nackens, Nagins, Nakins, Naggens and Nakens among other variants, are the most common, widespread and most well attested nomadic ethnic group in the Lowlands of Scotland.

=== Language ===
Nawkens speak a dialect called Cant, also called Scots-Romani. Estimates of the Romani element in Cant includes up to "50% debased Romani,” as well as a corpus incorporating words from Elizabethan Cant, Scots, and Scots Gaelic among others.

== Showmen Travellers ==
Showmen, also known as Funfair Travellers or Fairground Travellers and sometimes as carnies are a community of occupational travellers, who do not form an ethnic group but an occupational and organisational subculture, which can be categorised broadly as a business community of travelling shows, circus and carnival communities, and fairground families. Occupational travellers travel for work across Scotland, England, Wales and into continental Europe. The show/fairground community is close knit, with ties often existing between them and the older Romanichal families, although showmen families are a distinct, multi-ethnic group and have a vibrant social scene organised around both the summer fairs and the various sites and yards used as winter quarters. Many Scottish show and fairground families live in winter communities based mainly in the east end of Glasgow. Housing an estimated 80% of all British show families, Glasgow is believed to have the largest concentration of showmen quarters in Europe, mostly in Shettleston, Whiteinch, and Carntyne.

Showmen families have a strong cultural identity as British Showmen, dating back to 1889 and the formation of the Showmen's Guild of Great Britain and Ireland. Those in Scotland are known within the broader showmen tradition in the UK as the "Scottish section". As with other showmen communities, they call non-travellers (but not other distinct travelling groups including Romanichal, Roma, Scottish Lowland Travellers, Highland Travellers, or Irish Travellers) as flatties in their own Parlyaree language. The label of flattie-traveller can include showmen who have left the community to settle down and lead a sedentary lifestyle.

=== History ===
Fairs in Scotland have been held from the early Middle Ages, and traditionally brought together the important elements of medieval trade and a festival. Many of the common markets and fairs are rooted in ancient times, from the medieval period or earlier, and are said to be "prescriptive fairs". Other fairs will have been granted a royal charter to cement their importance and secure their future, and these are known as charter fairs. In the middle ages, the royal charters gave the fairs legal status and developed their economic importance. The majority of fairs held in Scotland and the rest of the British Isles can trace their origins to charters granted in the medieval period. Traders would travel long distances to sell their goods, as did travelling musicians and entertainers who kept both the traders and customers entertained. In the thirteenth century, the creation of fairs by royal charter was widespread. Between 1199 and 1350, charters were issued granting the rights to hold markets or fairs. Kirkcaldy links market remains the longest-running funfair in Scotland, from a charter granted by Edward I in 1304. By the early 18th century, the livestock-market aspect of these Scottish charter fairs had diminished, with the focus shifting to amusement, and they evolved into the modern-day travelling fairs.

The modern travelling showmen have as strong a family history and heritage as do their counterparts in Wales, England and Ireland. Fairs in Scotland are presented around the same time as they are in the rest of Great Britain and Ireland with a similar mixture of Charter, Prescriptive and private business fairs. The run of fairs include Buckie fair, Inverness, Kirkcaldy links market and the historic fairs held at Dundee and Arbroath. Annually a team of young showmen from both Scotland and England play an “international football match” known as the international, where trophies and caps are held in high esteem. A Showman newspaper; World's Fair is in circulation and available to showmen and non showmen alike.

=== Language ===
Parlyaree is the language spoken by Showmen Travellers. Parlyaree is primarily a mixture of Italian, Thieves' Cant, Angloromani, Yiddish and backslang. Parlyaree has been spoken in fairgrounds and theatrical entertainment since at least the seventeenth century.

== Notable Romani people and Travellers in Scotland ==
- Andy M. Stewart, Scottish folk-singer and songwriter. Lead singer of the band Silly Wizard
- Lizzie Higgins, Scottish folk singer (daughter of Jeannie Robertson).
- Jeannie Robertson, Scottish folk singer.
- Belle Stewart, Scottish traditional singer.
- Sheila Stewart, daughter of Belle Stewart, who was awarded the British Empire Medal for services to her country's cultural oral tradition in Scots and Gaelic.
- Duncan Williamson, author / storyteller who wrote down the oral history, stories and ancient tales of the Highland Traveller. He recorded over 3,000 stories over his lifetime.
- Stanley Robertson, master storyteller, ballad singer and author of several books of Lowland Traveller tales. (Nephew of Jeannie Robertson)
- Jamie Macpherson, 17th century Highland outlaw, fiddler and composer of 'Macpherson's Lament'
- Sandy Reid, author of Never to Return, about his experience as a Traveller child taken from his parents by the British government

== Discrimination ==
=== Tinker Experiment ===
Supported by local authorities and the wider United Kingdom Government, from the 1940s to 1980s a series of policies retroactively labelled as the "Tinker Experiment" were pursued. The goal of these policies was to assimilate Travellers into the wider population by acclimatising them to "normal housing", preventing them from traditional nomadic practices. This process involved the relocation of Scottish Traveller families into designated campsites across Scotland, including Aberdeenshire, Argyll, Highlands, Perthshire, Fife and the Scottish Borders.

Families who resisted the move were reported to have been threatened with the removal of their children into social care. The conditions on many of these sites were described as poor: the Bobbin Mill site in Pitlochry originally featured prefabricated military Nissen Huts with no electricity and coal-fired heating, with one family reporting "one bedroom for nine of us".

The policies have been described by critics and former residents as a form of cultural genocide, compared to similar policies carried out against other indigenous or minority groups, such the Canadian Indian residential school system. In 2022, the Scottish SNP Government announced an independent report would be commissioned into the experiment.

=== Pejorative terms ===
The term gypsy is seen as pejorative by some Scottish Romani people.

== See also ==
- Romani people
- Romanichal
- Romanisael
- Kale
- Kaale
- Travellers
- Travelling Showmen
- Irish Travellers
- Indigenous Norwegian Travellers
