= Shelta =

Language spoken by Irish Travellers

- The Seldru, the Cant, Seiltis
- De Gammon, Tarri
- Region: Ireland
- Ethnicity: Irish Travellers
- Native speakers: 50,000 (2008)
- Language family: mixed Irish–English
- Writing system: Latin

Language codes
- ISO 639-3: sth
- Glottolog: shel1236
- ELP: Shelta
- Linguasphere: 50-ACA-a

Shelta (/ˈʃɛltə/; Irish: Seiltis) is a language spoken by Irish Travellers (Mincéirí), particularly in Ireland and the United Kingdom. It is also widely known as the Cant, known to its native speakers in Ireland as de Gammon or Tarri, and known to the academic or professional linguistic community as Shelta. Other terms for it include the Seldru, and Shelta Thari, among others (see below).

The exact number of native speakers is hard to determine due to sociolinguistic issues but Ethnologue puts the number of speakers at 30,000 in the UK, 6,000 in Ireland, and 50,000 in the US (the figure for at least the UK is dated to 1990; it is not clear if the other figures are from the same source).

Linguistically, Shelta is today seen as a mixed language that stems from a community of travelling people in Ireland that was originally predominantly Irish-speaking. The community later went through a period of widespread bilingualism that resulted in a language based heavily on Hiberno-English with significant influences from Irish. As different varieties of Shelta display different degrees of anglicisation, it is hard to determine the extent of the Irish substratum. The Oxford Companion to the English Language puts it at 2,000–3,000 words.

== Names and etymology ==
The language is known by various names. People outside the Irish Traveller community often refer to it as [the] Cant, the etymology of which is a matter of debate. Speakers of the language refer to it as [the] Cant, [de] Gammon or Tarri. Amongst linguists, the name Shelta is the most commonly used term.

Variants of the above names and additional names include Bog Latin, Gammon, Sheldru, Shelter, Shelteroch, the Ould Thing, Tinker's Cant, and Shelta Thari.

=== Etymology ===
The word Shelta appeared in print for the first time in 1882, in the book The Gypsies by the "gypsiologist" Charles Leland, who claimed to have discovered it as the "fifth Celtic tongue". The word's etymology has long been a matter of debate. Modern Celticists believe that Irish siúl [ʃuːlʲ] "to walk" is at the root, either via a term such as siúltóir [ˈʃuːl̪ˠt̪ˠoːɾʲ] 'a walker' or a form of the verbal noun siúladh; thus, an lucht siúlta [ənˠ ˌl̪ˠʊxt̪ˠ ˈʃuːl̪ˠt̪ˠə], 'the walking people', lit. 'the people of walks', is the traditional Irish term for Travellers.

The Dictionary of Hiberno-English cites it as possibly a corruption of the word Celt. Since Shelta is a mixture of English and Irish grammar, the etymology is not straightforward. The language is made up mostly of Irish lexicon, being classified as a grammar-lexicon language with the grammar being English-based.

== Origins and history ==
Linguists have been documenting Shelta since at least the 1870s. The first works were published in 1880 and 1882 by Charles Leland. Celticist Kuno Meyer and Romani expert John Sampson both assert that Shelta existed as far back as the 13th century.

In the earliest but undocumented period, linguists surmise that the Traveller community was Irish-speaking until a period of widespread bilingualism in Irish and Hiberno-English, and Scots language in Scotland set in, leading to creolisation (possibly with a trilingual stage). The resulting language is referred to as Old Shelta, and it is suspected that this stage of the language displayed distinctive features, such as non-English syntactic and morphological features, no longer found in Shelta.

Within the diaspora, various sub-branches of Shelta exist. Shelta in England is increasingly undergoing anglicisation. American Irish-Traveller's Cant, originally synonymous with Shelta, has by now been almost fully anglicised.

== Linguistic features ==
Sociologist Sharon Gmelch describes the Irish Travellers' language as follows:

Irish Travellers use a secret argot or cant known as Gammon. It is used primarily to conceal meaning from outsiders, especially during business transactions and in the presence of police. Most Gammon utterances are terse and spoken so quickly that a non-Traveler might conclude the words merely had been garbled. Most Gammon words were formed from Irish by applying four techniques: reversal, metathesis, affixing, and substitution. In the first, an Irish word is reversed to form a Gammon one – mac, or 'son', in Irish became kam in Gammon. In the second, consonants or consonant clusters were transposed. Thirdly, a sound or cluster of sounds were either prefixed or suffixed to an Irish word. Some of the more frequently prefixed sounds were s, gr, and g. For example, obair, 'work or job', became gruber in Gammon. Lastly, many Gammon words were formed by substituting an arbitrary consonant or consonant cluster in an Irish word. In recent years, modern slang and Romani (the language of the gypsies) words have been incorporated. The grammar and syntax are English. The first vocabulary collected from Irish Travellers was published in 1808, indicating that Gammon dates at least back to the 1700s. But many early Celtic scholars who studied it, including Kuno Meyer, concluded it was much older.

Thus, by design, it is not mutually intelligible with either English or Irish.

Shelta is a secret language. Travellers do not like to share the language with outsiders, named Buffers, or non-travellers. When speaking Shelta in front of Buffers, Travellers will disguise the structure so as to make it seem like they aren't speaking Shelta at all.

=== Lexicon ===
While Shelta is influenced by English grammar, it is a mixture of Irish words as well. The word order is altered, syllables are reversed, and many of the original words are Irish that have been altered or reversed. Many Shelta words have been disguised using techniques such as back slang, where sounds are transposed. For example, gop 'kiss' from Irish póg, or the addition of sounds, for example gather 'father' from Irish athair. Other examples include lackín or lakeen 'girl' from Irish cailín, and the word rodas 'door' from Irish doras.

=== Grammar ===
Shelta shares its main syntactic features with Hiberno-English and the majority of its morphological features such as -s plurals and past tense markers. Compare:

Shelta	English	Irish
de gyuck, de gloχ; gloχi	'the man'; 'men'	'an fear'; 'na fir'
de byor, de byohr, de beoir	'the woman'	'an bhean'
lohsped, lósped	'married'	'pósta'
sooblik, sublick, subla, subleen	'boy, lad'	'buachaill' 'buachaillín'
kam	'son'	'mac'
lackin, lakeen	'girl'	'cailín'
máilles	'hands'	'lámha'
lúrógs	'eyes'	'súile'
groog	'hair'	'gruaig'
pí	'mouth'	'béal'
gop	'kiss'	'póg'
ríspa	'trousers'	'brístí'
guillimins	'shoes'	'bróga'
tugs	'clothes'	'éadaí'
griffin	'coat'	'cóta'
lorch	'car'	'carr'
lí	'bed'	'leaba'; also 'luí', to lie
nucel	'candle'	'coinneal'
rodas	'door'	'doras'
talósc	'day'	'lá'
olomi	'night'	'oiche'
luscán	'fish'	'iasc'
solk, bug	'take'	'tóg'
bug	'go'; 'give'; 'get'	'té'; 'tabhair'; 'faigh'
krosh	'go'; 'come'	'té'; 'tar'
gloke, gratch, oagle, dashe	'look'; 'see'; 'watch'	'breathnaigh'; 'féach'; 'fairigh'
nook	'head'	'ceann'
innic	'thing'; 'gizmo'; can refer to just about anything	'rud'; 'ní'
shay joug	'police'	'garda'; 'póilíní'
gruber	'work'; 'job'	'obair'
gayge	'to be persistent about wanting something'	'ag iarraidh'
carb	'to hit something or someone'	'buail'
yonk	'steal'; 'rob'	'goidigh'
thary	'talk'; 'speak'	'deir'; 'labhair'
wisht	'shut up, stop talking' (see also Scots and dialectal English whisht)	'éist (do bhéal)'
glon	'money'	'airgead'
hawking	'looking for'	'ag lorg'
tack	'one's personal items' (usually)	'cuid earraí'
lush	'eat', 'food'	'ith'; 'bia'
crudgy	'to leave somewhere in a hurry'	'teithigh'
skraχo	'tree, bush'	'crann'; 'sceach'

There is not as much importance put on gender in Shelta as in Irish. Plurals are shown with the English suffix /-s/ or /-i/, such as gloχ for 'man' becomes gloχi for 'men'.

=== Phonology ===
Shelta has 27 consonants and 6 phonemic vowels.

Many words are complex by incorporating numerous consonants within, as in the word skraχo for 'tree, bush' with the consonant /χ/ being a hissing sound that is held in the back of the throat, and is held longer than other consonants.

Consonants
		Labial		Coronal		Palatal	Dorsal		Uvular
		broad	slender	broad	slender	Palatal	broad	slender	Uvular
Nasal		m	mʲ	n	nʲ				
Stop	voiceless	p	pʲ	t	tʲ		k	kʲ	
Stop	voiced	b	bʲ	d	dʲ		ɡ	ɡʲ	
Fricative	voiceless			θ	ʃ				
Fricative	voiced			ð					χ
Affricate					tʃ				
Rhotic				r	rʲ				
Lateral				l		ʎ			
Approximant		(w)				j	w		

The vowel system features phonemic lengthening for all vowels except for /ə/. Additionally, [ey, iy, ow, uw] can be realized as diphthongs in certain varieties of Shelta.

Vowels
	Front	Central	Back
Close	i		u
Close-mid	e	ə	ɔ
Open		a	

== Loanwords ==
Some Shelta words have been borrowed by mainstream English speakers, such as the word "bloke" meaning 'a man' in the mid-19th century.

== Orthography ==
There is no standard orthography. Broadly speaking, Shelta can either be written following an Irish-type orthography or an English-type orthography. For example, the word for 'married' can either be spelled lósped or lohsped; the word for 'woman' can either be spelled beoir or byohr.

== Comparison texts ==
Below are reproductions of the Lord's Prayer in Shelta as it occurred a century ago, current Shelta Cant, and modern English and Irish versions for comparison. The 19th-century Shelta version shows a high Shelta lexical content while the later Cant version shows a much lower Shelta lexical content. Both versions are adapted from Hancock who notes that the Cant reproduction is not exactly representative of actual speech in normal situations.

Shelta (old)	Shelta (current)	English	Irish
Mwilsha's gater, swart a manyath,	Our gathra, who cradgies in the manyak-norch,	Our Father, who art in heaven,	Ár n-Athair atá ar neamh,
Manyi graw a kradji dilsha's manik.	We turry kerrath about your moniker.	Hallowed be thy name.	Go naofar d'ainm,
Graw bi greydid, sheydi laadu	Let's turry to the norch where your jeel cradgies,	Thy kingdom come, Thy will be done,	Go dtaga do ríocht, Go ndéantar do thoil
Az aswart in manyath.	And let your jeel shans get greydied nosher same as it is where you cradgie.	On earth as it is in heaven.	ar an talamh, mar a dhéantar ar neamh.
Bag mwilsha talosk minyart goshta dura.	Bug us eynik to lush this thullis,	Give us today our daily bread.	Ár n-arán laethúil tabhair dúinn inniú,
Geychel aur shaaku areyk mwilsha	And turri us you're nijesh sharrig for the eyniks we greydied	And forgive us our trespasses,	Agus maith dúinn ár bhfiacha
Geychas needjas greydi gyamyath mwilsha.	Just like we ain't sharrig at the needies that greydi the same to us.	As we forgive those who trespass against us.	Mar a mhaithimid ár bhfiachóirí féin
Nijesh solk mwil start gyamyath,	Nijesh let us soonie eyniks that'll make us greydi gammy eyniks,	And lead us not into temptation,	Is ná lig sinn i gcathú
Bat bog mwilsha ahim gyamyath.	But solk us away from the taddy.	but deliver us from evil.	ach saor sinn ó olc.
Diyil the sridag, taajirath an manyath		Yours is the kingdom, the power and the glory	Óir is leatsa an Ríocht agus an chumhacht agus an Ghlóir,
Gradum a gradum.		For ever and ever	Tré shaol na saol
Naemia.		Amen.	Áiméan.

== See also ==
- Beurla Reagaird
- Bungi dialect
- Polari
- Scottish Cant
