= Jeannie Robertson =

Scottish folk singer (1908–1975)

Regina Christina Robertson (21 October 1908 – 13 March 1975) was a Scottish folk singer.

She is known for her version of the traditional song "I'm a Man You Don't Meet Every Day", otherwise known as "Jock Stewart", which was covered by Archie Fisher, The Dubliners, The McCalmans, The Tannahill Weavers and The Pogues. Other versions of the song are known from the US in the 1880s and Australia in the 1850s.

== Early life and career ==
Regina Christina Robertson was born on 21 October 1908, in Aberdeen, Scotland. Her father Donald (d. 1909), was a piper and her mother Maria (née Stewart), was a singer. In her early life she sometimes lived at 90 Hilton Road, where a plaque now commemorates her.

Hamish Henderson wanted to track down the best singers in Blairgowrie. In 1953, he followed Robertson's reputation to her doorstep in Aberdeen. According to legend, Robertson was reluctant to let him in. She challenged him to tell her the opening line of Child ballad no 163, "The Battle of Harlaw", and he complied. In November of the same year she was staying in the London apartment of Alan Lomax. In preparation for a TV appearance, Jean Ritchie, Margaret Barry and Isla Cameron were also there. They swapped songs with each other, while the tape rolled. It is sometimes stated that she made the first recording of "The Battle of Harlaw" but this is not so. Another of the songs she sang was "Andrew Lammie" ("Mill o' Tifty's Annie"), lasting over 13 minutes. At the end she told Alan Lomax about the parts of the story that she had not sung. Many of the 1953 recordings were issued as The Queen Among the Heather in 1975. They later reappeared along with other songs on a CD of the same name.

== Performances ==
The television programme was The Song Hunter, produced by David Attenborough, who later became controller of BBC Two television. In 1958, Hamish Henderson recorded her in Edinburgh. Those recordings were issued as Up the Dee and Doon The Don on the Lismor label. The Traditional Music and Song Association founded the Blairgowrie Festival in 1965, during the fruit picking. The first festival saw Robertson, plus Jimmy MacBeath and other valuable source singers, who learned folk songs without the influence of radios or books. Her 1968 appearance there was issued as part of an anthology on the Topic label. As well as classic ballads, she sang bawdy songs such as "Never Wed an Old Man".

== Related folk musicians ==
Robertson's daughter Lizzie Higgins issued an album in 1975: Up and Awa' wi' the Laverock. Stanley Robertson, a storyteller, ballad singer and piper from Aberdeen, was Jeannie's nephew. Carmen Higgins, ex-fiddler with the Aberdeen folk band, Rock Salt and Nails, who died on 21 March 2026, was also closely related to her. Carmen Higgins played with Old Blind Dogs, recorded a solo CD, and appeared regularly on television, radio and in the press. Joss Cameron, a folk singer from Edinburgh is related to her, and still performs Jeannie Robertson ballads.

Maggie Stewart (1902–1983), Robertson's aunt, was recorded singing many traditional ballads and telling stories which can be heard via the Tobar an Dualchais website. In the early 1960s, the folk-singer Andy Hunter learned songs and storytelling from Robertson and her family while studying French at the University of Aberdeen.

== Personal life ==
Robertson was awarded the MBE in 1968, being the first folk singer and first traveller to receive the award. She died on 13 March 1975. She had a daughter, Lizzie, who was also a singer.

== Discography ==
- Lord Donald, Collector JFS 4001
- World's Greatest Folk Singer, Prestige (1960) INT 13006
- The Cuckoo's Nest and Other Scottish Folk Songs, Prestige INT 13075
- Songs of a Scots Tinker Lady, (with Josh Morse) Riverside RLP12-633
- Jeannie Robertson, Topic (1959) 10T52
- --do.--(without guitar acc.), Topic 12T96
- What a Voice, Folktracks TFSA 60–067
- The Gypsy Lady, Folktracks TFSA 60–186
- Silly John & the Factor, (folk tale & talk) Folktracks TFSA 60–187
- Up the Dee and doon the Don, Lismor (1984)

In 2009, "MacCrimmon's Lament" from Jeannie Robertson was included in Topic Records 70-year anniversary CD boxed set Three Score and Ten.

== See also ==
- Scottish Travellers
- Lizzie Higgins
