= Beurla Reagaird =

Scottish Gaelic–based cant

- Region: Scottish Highlands
- Language family: Indo-European: Celtic; Insular Celtic; Goidelic; Scottish Gaelic; Beurla Reagaird
- Early forms: Primitive Irish: Old Irish; Middle Irish; Scottish Gaelic

Language codes
- ISO 639-3: –

Beurla Reagaird (Scottish Gaelic pronunciation: [ˈpjɤːrˠl̪ˠə ˈɾɛkərˠtʲ]; previously also spelled Beurla Reagair or Beurla-reagaird) is a nearly extinct Scottish Gaelic–based cant used by the indigenous Traveller community of the Highlands of Scotland, formerly often referred to by the disparaging name "tinkers".

== Name ==
Beurla Reagaird loosely translates as 'speech of metalworkers' in reference to their traditional occupation of being traveling tinsmiths. Although Beurla today refers to the English language, its original meaning is that of 'jargon' (from Old Irish bélre, bél 'mouth' plus the abstract forming suffix -re), with the second element being linked to the word eagar 'order, array, arrangement' (compare with the Irish Béarla na Saor 'speech of the smiths').

== See also ==
- Bungi dialect
- Polari
- Shelta
