= Music of Northumbria =

Here Northumbria is defined as Northumberland, the northernmost county of England, and County Durham. According to 'World Music: The Rough Guide', "nowhere is the English living tradition more in evidence than the border lands of Northumbria, the one part of England to rival the counties of the west of Ireland for a rich unbroken tradition. The region is particularly noted for its tradition of border ballads, the Northumbrian smallpipes (a form of bagpipes unique to North East England) and also a strong fiddle tradition in the region that was already well established in the 1690s. Northumbrian music is characterised by considerable influence from other regions (and vice versa), particularly southern Scotland and other parts of the north of England, as well as Irish immigrants.

== Local musical forms and styles ==
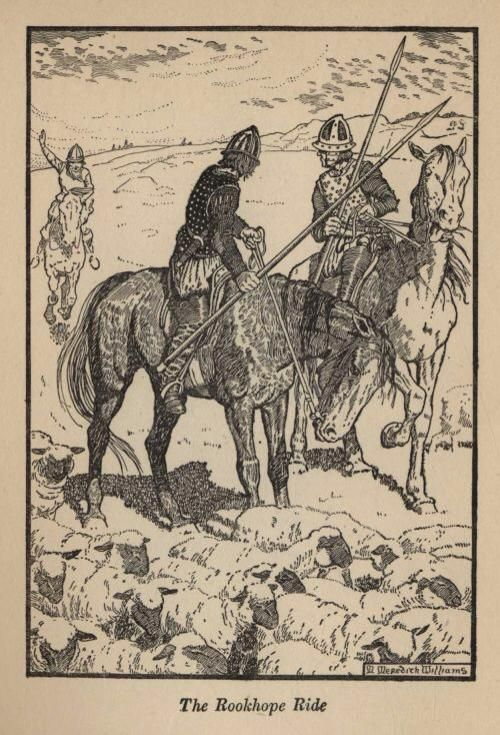
The Rookhope Ryde, a County Durham border ballad, recounts an incursion by Tynedale reivers into Rookhope, a Weardale side valley.

Northumbria shares with southern Scotland the long history of border ballads, such as 'The Ballad of Chevy Chase'. It is also known for local dances, namely rapper dancing and Durham and Northumberland style clog dancing. The dance music of Northumbria differs markedly in style from that of the rest of England. It has more in common with Irish dance music, and especially Scottish dance music, yet is to some extent unique. Many dances from the region have the characteristic rant step.

Although many tunes are shared with other regions of England or other nations, there is often a distinct difference between a Northumbrian version of a tune and versions from elsewhere. For instance a simple Irish tune, 'The Chorus Jig', with three strains, appears in the Northumbrian tradition as 'Holey Ha'penny', an ornate five-strain variation set. A Scottish strathspey, 'Struan Robertson's Rant' appears, stripped of the Scotch snap, as a smallpipe tune, 'Cuckold come out of the Amrey', a long variation set. These two examples illustrate the impossibility of ascribing a regional origin to an old tune; each can be played on a primitive instrument, and may have been played for as long before first publication, as they have been since. Assumptions of regional origins can bedevil the study of music undertaken by enthusiastic musicians (who may sadly follow partisan allegiances) however regional versions and styles (like Northumbrian) are quite a different matter, having reliable established sources.

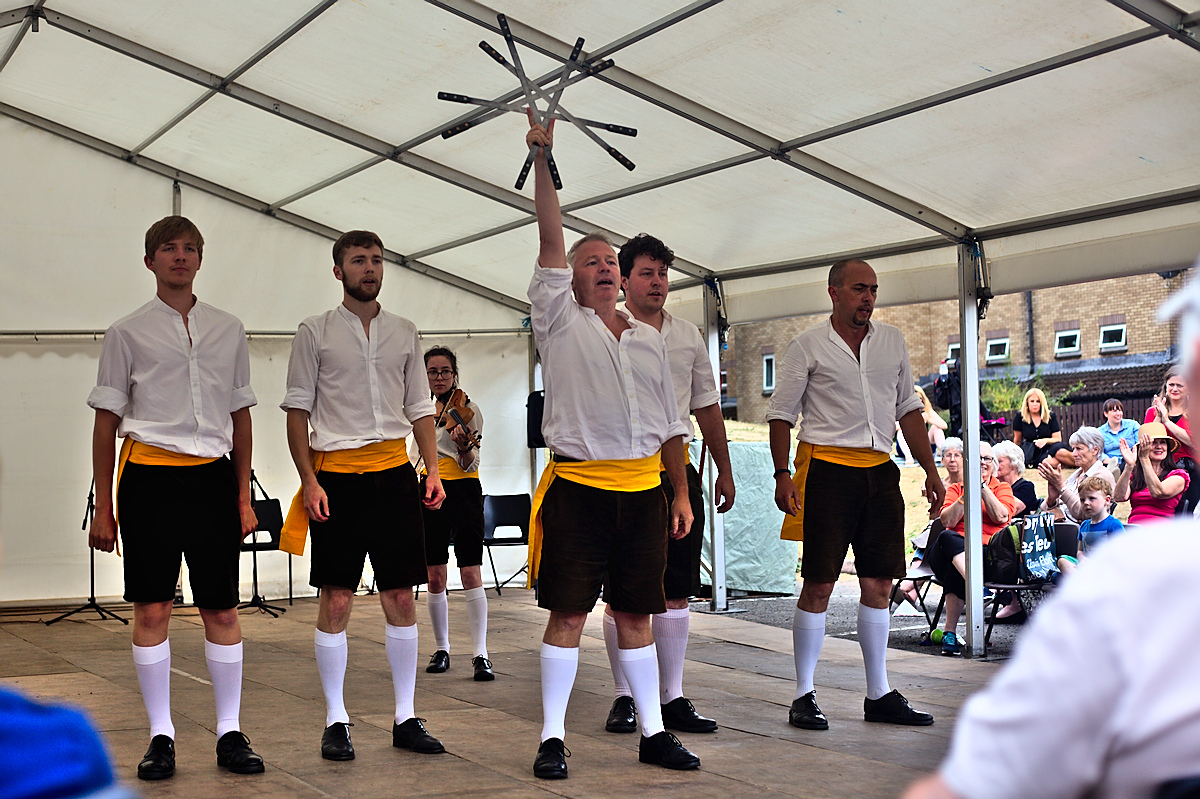
Rapper sword dance.

Tunes in hornpipe rhythm are much appreciated in the region, both for playing and for dancing, particularly clog dancing. One rhythm characteristic of the region is the rant, used for figure dances such as The Morpeth Rant with a characteristic step; musically it is similar to a reel, though somewhat slower, and with more of a lilt.

During 1770–2 William Vickers made a manuscript collection of local dance tunes, of which some 580 survive, including both pipe and fiddle tunes, many of which are from Scotland, southern England, Ireland and even France, revealing the very extensive and varied repertoire of local musicians at that time.

== Bagpipe music ==
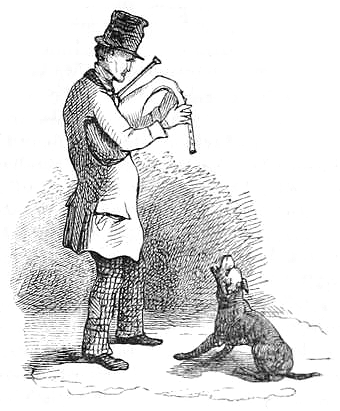
A Northumbrian piper at Gilsland, 1860s.

In the later medieval period pipe music appears to have been characterized by the use of the Northumbrian 'war pipe', which may have been the ancestor of the Great Highland Bagpipe, but no example has survived. It appears to have been replaced in the region by the eighteenth century by a variety of pipes, ranging from the conical bore, open-ended border pipes, to the cylindrically bored smallpipes; the closed-ended form with its single octave compass and closed fingering is known to have existed since the seventeenth century, and open-ended forms were also known. The Union or Pastoral pipes, the precursor of the Irish Uilleann pipes, are also known to have been played and made in the region. The earliest known bagpipe manuscript from the UK is a tunebook by William Dixon of Stamfordham in Northumberland, dated 1733. This includes forty tunes with extensive sets of variations. Some of the tunes correspond to later versions of known smallpipe tunes; others, with a nine-note compass, must have been played either on Border pipes or on an open-ended smallpipe, like the Scottish smallpipes.

an engraving of Billy Purvis (1784–1853) one of the last travelling minstrel pipers of the south of Scotland and the North East of England. Playing a Union pipe early-nineteenth century.

In the early nineteenth century, makers such as John Dunn and Robert and James Reid added keys to the closed-ended smallpipe, extending its range to almost two octaves. With its greater flexibility, the instrument became more fashionable at this time. On the other hand, the Border pipes seem not to have been found in Northumberland much after the middle of the century, though they were revived as the 'half-long pipes' in the 1920s and more successfully in the 1970s and 80s.

Many families have been associated with traditional Northumbrian piping. Will Allan (Old Wull) and his son James (Jemmy) were noted pipers in the eighteenth century: James played on several occasions for the Countess of Northumberland. In 1756 Joseph Turnbull was appointed piper to the Countess. The Percy family have continued to maintain a piper to this day. Contrary to popular tradition, the Duke's current piper, Richard Butler, has written that "there is no record in the Percy Archives (Alnwick Castle) recording that James Allan was Piper to the Duchess or Duke". Turnbull's pupil, John Peacock was probably the first Northumbrian piper to play a keyed chanter. Most notably, the Clough family of Newsham produced six generations of pipers, including Tom Clough, who made an important early recording in 1929, and taught many pipers, including Billy Pigg.

== Fiddle music ==
The earliest source of music for fiddle from Northumberland is Henry Atkinson's tunebook from the 1690s. This includes tunes current in both the southern English and Scottish music of the time. A later source, unfortunately lost, was John Smith's tunebook from 1750. Some tunes from this were copied out by John Stokoe in the nineteenth century: these include an extended set of variations on the song The Keel Row for fiddle (the earliest known version), pipe tunes with variations such as Bold Wilkinson, and a version of Jacky Layton with variations for fiddle. It is clear that as in Scotland, the playing of extended variation sets on the fiddle was current in Northumberland at the time. A slightly later source, the William Vickers manuscript, from 1770, and also for fiddle, contains 580 simple dance tunes, but few variation sets.

In the nineteenth century the most notable feature of the region's music was the popularity of the hornpipe in 4/4 time, and in particular the very influential playing of the publican, fiddler and composer James Hill. His compositions include 'The High Level Bridge', 'The Great Exhibition', 'The Beeswing', 'The Hawk' and many others. Many other fine tunes have been attributed to him, but these include some he cannot possibly have written. Another local composer, in the later 19th century, was the fiddler and dancing master Robert Whinham, some 60 of whose compositions survive, notably the hornpipe 'Remember Me', and 'Whinham's Reel'.

In the early- and mid-twentieth century, influential fiddlers included Ned Pearson, Jim Rutherford, Adam Gray, George Hepple and Jake Hutton, father of the noted piper Joe Hutton. John Armstrong of Carrick played with the piper Billy Pigg. In the later part of the century, Willy Taylor was perhaps the most highly respected of the many fiddlers in the region.

== Other instruments ==
Other musical instruments which have been used in the region include the flute and piccolo. Some nineteenth-century manuscripts contain tunes which are in keys and registers appropriate to the flute. Billy Ballantine was a piccolo player from the west of the region, who played for dances in the mid-twentieth century. The style of his playing was very distinctive, mixing staccato notes for rhythmic emphasis with more ornate passages. He made recordings of tunes like the Kielder Schottische and The Gilsland Hornpipe for the BBC. Billy Conroy made some recordings on home-made whistles.

Free reed instruments have been of growing importance since their development in the nineteenth century. In particular the mouth organ or "moothie" was played notably by Will Atkinson. As elsewhere in England the melodeon has been used for dance music.

== Folk revivals ==
The first folk revival in the region tended to circulate around folk dance, the collection of border ballads and, from the later 1870s, the revival of interest in pipe music.

John Bell collected many tunes and songs from the region in the early nineteenth century. Later on, in the middle of the century the Ancient Melodies Committee of the Newcastle Society of Antiquaries attempted a more comprehensive collection, based largely on manuscript and printed sources; this was later edited for publication by John Collingwood Bruce and John Stokoe.

The Northumbrian Small Pipes Society was founded in Newcastle in 1893; although it was short-lived, only continuing until 1900, it ran a series of competitions, won by Henry Clough and Richard Mowat. The Northumbrian Pipers' Society was founded in 1928, and are generally credited with helping to keep the distinctive tradition alive. The first recordings of the Northumbrian smallpipes were made in the late 1920s, including the His Master's Voice recording of Tom Clough.

Border ballads were a major part of those collected by Francis James Child and make up most of the sixth volume of his ten volume collection of The English and Scottish Popular Ballads (1882–98).

The second folk revival saw a number of acts drawing on this work, and enjoying some success. Probably the most influential piper from the region was Billy Pigg, but other important pipers in the mid-twentieth century include G. G. Armstrong, George Atkinson, Jack Armstrong, and Joe Hutton. Figures such as Lou Killen, The High Level Ranters and Bob Davenport brought Northumbrian folk to national and international audiences.

The melody later used by Simon & Garfunkel in "Scarborough Fair/Canticle" was first sung by Mark Anderson (1874–1953), a retired lead miner from Middleton-in-Teesdale, County Durham, to Ewan MacColl in 1947. MacColl recorded the lyrics and melody in a book of Teesdale folk songs, and later included it on his and Peggy Seeger's The Singing Island (1960)

The most successful folk group from the region in the 1970s were Lindisfarne, who played progressive folk music with some local stylings. Much more concerned with traditional music from the region were the group that splintered from them in 1973 Jack the Lad, and another group from which they gained some members Hedgehog Pie, who, for a time, provided a regional answer to the British folk rock of bands like Fairport Convention and Steeleye Span. These groups have been seen as continuing an exploration of regional identity through folk music. Between their demise and revival in the 1990s, the local scene continued through groups like the more traditional Doonan family, which contained some of the finest folk flute players in the region. These groups have been seen as continuing an exploration of regional identity through folk music.

Another prolific figure from the 1970s to 2000s was Eric Boswell. While best known for writing the Christmas song Little Donkey, Boswell's local ballads like I've Got A Little Whippet, Sweet Waters Of Tyne and Tyneside's Where I Come From often featured on Tyne Tees and at Newcastle City Hall Geordierama concerts and The Little Waster Bobby Thompson and various others made recordings. Boswell's songs continue to be performed in folk clubs.

Colin Ross, has been influential not only as a player and teacher of the Northumbrian pipes, but has also been an important pipemaker, as David G. Burleigh was. Distinctive local sounds were much more marked in the next generation of traditional Northumbrian folk musicians such as Ed Pickford and Jez Lowe, who have reinvigorated the local scene and artists like fiddler Nancy Kerr and piper Kathryn Tickell have gained international reputations, appearing on records with artists including Kate Rusby, Eliza Carthy and Sting. In 2003 June Tabor stimulated interest in the Border ballads with her album An Echo of Hooves.

Thanks to the efforts of musicians like these in 2001 Newcastle University was the first to offer a performance-based degree programme in folk and traditional music in England. Currently the region has over thirty active folk clubs and hosts several major folk festivals, including the Traditional Music Festival at Rothbury.

== Contemporary music in Northumbria ==
There are many artists and acts that have formed in the North East such as the Lighthouse Family and Dubstar (Newcastle upon Tyne), Maxïmo Park (Singer from Billingham, other band members met in Newcastle) The Futureheads and Field Music (Sunderland) as well as China Drum (from Ovingham). Musicians and singers that were born and raised in the region include Sting, Bryan Ferry, Dave Stewart, Mark Knopfler, Cheryl Tweedy, Andy Taylor of Duran Duran, Jimmy Nail (Auf Wiedersehen Pet, Spender), AC/DC's Brian Johnson, Neil Tennant of Pet Shop Boys, Paddy McAloon, and Moloko's Mark Brydon.

=== Northumbrian Mákina ===
Mákina music, a subgenre of hardcore techno originated in Spain, has thrived in North East England and Scotland from the late 1990s to current times. The genre is the staple of the rave scene in North East England and Scotland. Following the closures of the most prominent venues – in particular the New Monkey nightclub – its popularity has slightly faded in those areas and has been partially replaced with Scouse house. Despite this it still retains a strong cultural legacy; regularly heard blasting from coaches when Newcastle United and Sunderland AFC play away matches.

== Selected recordings ==
- Ranting and Reeling (1999) TSCD 669
- Bonny North Tyne: Northumbrian Country Music (Topic 12TS239)
- Holey Ha'Penny 12T283
- Wild Hills o'Wannie – The small pipes of Northumbria 12TS227
