= Archie Dagg =

Archie Dagg (1899 – 1990) was a shepherd and traditional fiddler, piper and composer from central Northumberland. He was born at Linbriggs, in Upper Coquetdale, and except for his time in the Army at the end of the First World War, lived all his life in that region. In the late 1930s, he was a member of the English Sheepdog Trials Team; when competing with them in Scotland, he would play Scottish tunes on the Northumbrian smallpipes, and found he would get a steady supply of free drams.

== Musical career ==
Dagg learned the fiddle from his father, who forbade him to play anything but hymns on a Sunday; later he led the Hillbillies Dance Band during the 1920s and early 1930s. He was also an early member of the Northumbrian Pipers' Society; later he played as one of The Border Minstrels, along with Billy Pigg, John Armstrong (of Carrick), and Annie Snaith, from 1938. They did not play much during the war years, but restarted after the war. In a taped interview, another Border shepherd, Willie Scott, recalled that traditional musicians were rarely influenced by records or radio, Archie Dagg the piper certainly wasn't. he also stated that very few musicians could read music, one old piper, a cousin of his fathers, could "trace out an air" from scores, though it took him a long time before he could play it right, Archie Dagg couldn't, he needed to hear an air.

After retiring from farming, and settling first at Swindon, near Rothbury, and later at Rodsley Court, Rothbury, Dagg took to pipemaking, and particularly reedmaking, for which he became highly respected. Kathryn Tickell has stated that she learned on a set made by him; she still uses the bellows made by Archie Dagg with her current set. Francis Wood, himself a pipemaker, writes that "Dagg's best reeds were scraped relatively thin, giving a clear bright tone with a very rapid response, highly suitable for original Robert Reid chanters and others made after this pattern." Distinctively, he signed his reeds on the inside, in reverse, so his name is visible when the reed is held up to the light.

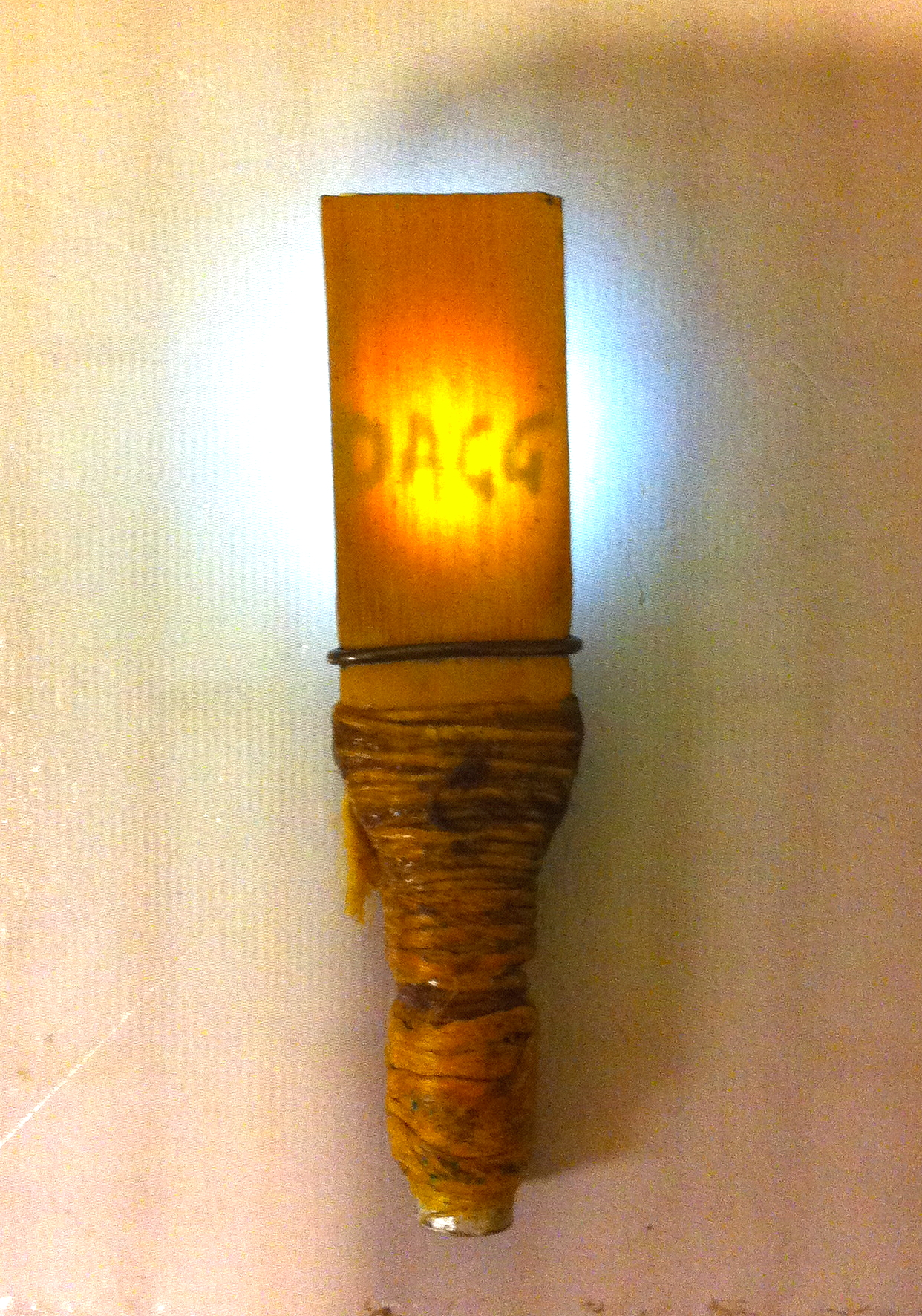
An Archie Dagg smallpipe chanter reed, showing the internal signature.

In the interview cited above, Willie Scott referred to "a tremendous set of pipes

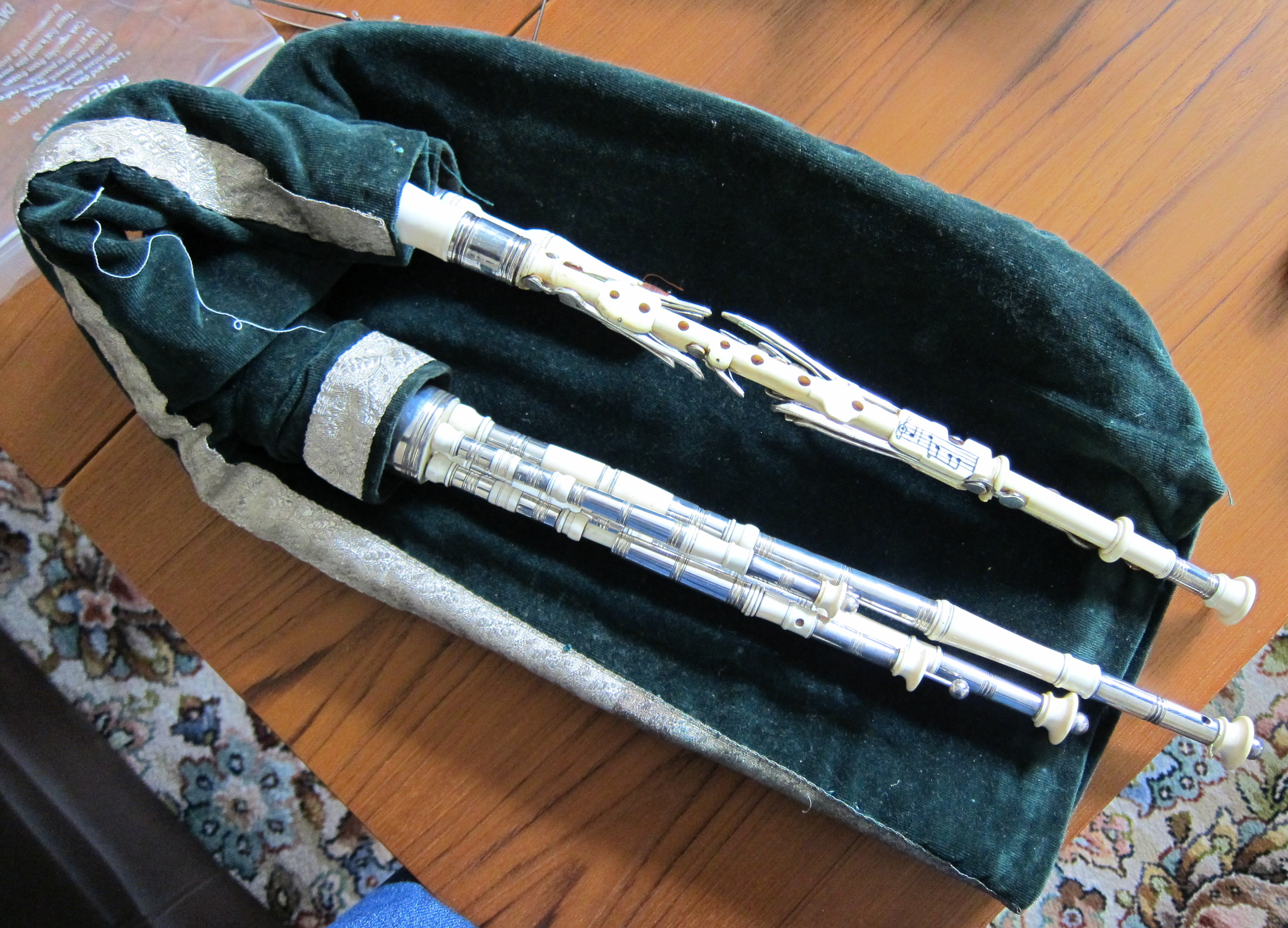
An extended ivory and silver set of smallpipes made by Archie Dagg.

that Archie Dagg had recently made from ivory". He signed his name on these musically, with the notes A DAGG shown on a stave.

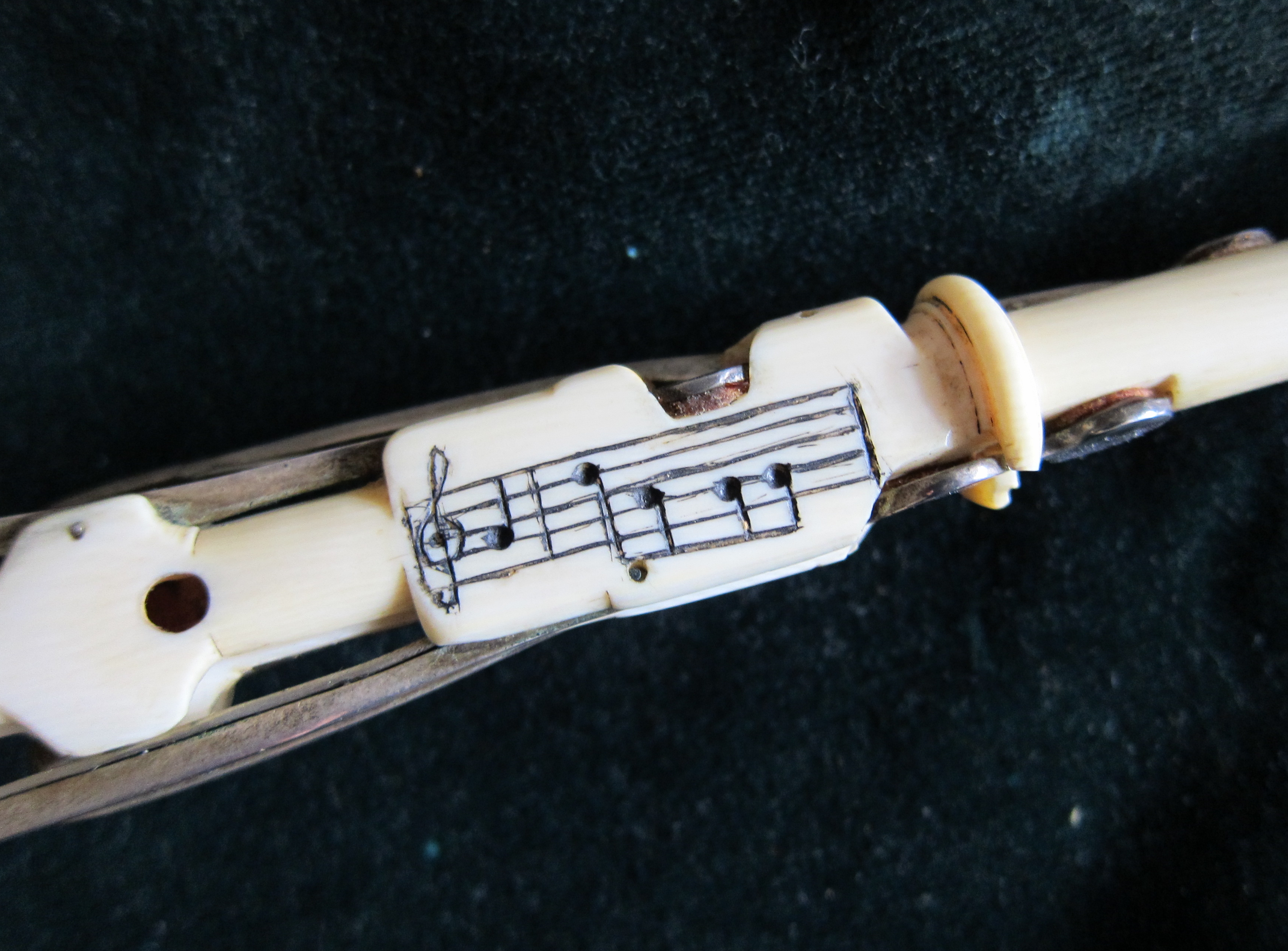
Archie Dagg's musical signature A DAGG, on the front of the chanter of his extended ivory and silver smallpipes.

An image of Archie himself playing these pipes was the cover photograph of The Northumbrian Pipers' Society Magazine, vol. 7, 1986.

His home at Rodsley Court was the venue for a regular weekly pipers' session for many years. He also composed tunes - his tunebook, 'A Coquetdale Garland' published in 1978, was reissued in an expanded edition after his death, in 1995, with a foreword by Joe Hutton. It includes 19 tunes, many of which have since become standards, regularly played at sessions, having been reprinted by the Northumbrian Pipers' Society and the Alnwick Pipers' Society. A recording on the FARNE Archive, by Joe Hutton includes three of these.

In taped interviews for a B.A. thesis, Dagg discussed how he started with the pipes, learning with Billy Pigg. In another tape, he talked in detail about pipemaking, and in a third he recalled Tom Clough, Richard Mowat, G.G. Armstrong and 'Kielder Jock' Davison. The recordings also include some of his playing, including his own 'Foxglove Hornpipe'. In the 1986 interview he remembered these musicians, and stated that Mowat was one of the best pipers ever, recalling his playing of the air "Caller Herrin"; he also recalled the playing of Harry Clough and Tom Clough, whose special tune was the variation set on "Maggy Lauder". He noted that formerly, most pipers were ear players, while nowadays they tend to play from written music; he preferred a happy medium. He deplored the tendency of some pipers to play tunes too fast, holding that to do so was not music at all.

== Compositions ==
The Northumbrian Pipers' Second Tune Book

- Elsey's Waltz

Northumbrian Pipers Society Magazine, Vol. 7

- Coplech Burn Hornpipe (Sept, 1982)
- Archie Dagg's March (June, 1982)

The Coquetdale Garland

- Ella Dagg of Swindon's Reel
- Swindon (air)
- A. Dagg's Strathspey
- The Cowslip Hornpipe
- Hottery Bank Polka
- The Tomtit Reel
- Keenshaw Burn Jig
- The Stickdresser's Hornpipe
- The Pipemaker's Hornpipe
- Elsey's Waltz
- Whisky Glen Jig
- Nup Blossom (hornpipe)
- Joe Hutton's March
- Harehaugh Jig

The Northumbrian Pipers' Third Tune Book

- The Lady's Well (slow air)
- Joe Hutton's March
- The Foxglove Hornpipe

The Alnwick Pipers' Society, A Selection of Locally Composed Music

- Elsey's Waltz, seconds by Derek Hobbs
- Swindon (air), seconds by Annie Snaith

Unknown

- The Simonside Hornpipe
- Rodsley Court (reel)

== Publications ==
- The Northumbrian Pipers' Second Tune Book, Northumbrian Pipers' Society, 1981.
- Northumbrian Pipers Society Magazine, Vol. 7, 1986
- The Northumbrian Pipers' Third Tune Book, Northumbrian Pipers' Society, 1991.
- The Coquetdale Garland, published by Iain Bain, Laverock Press, 1995.
- The Alnwick Pipers' Society, A Selection of Locally Composed Music, 2nd edition, B.& J. Say Smallpipes, 2002.
