= Northumbrian Small Pipes Society =

Former bagpipe society in Northumberland

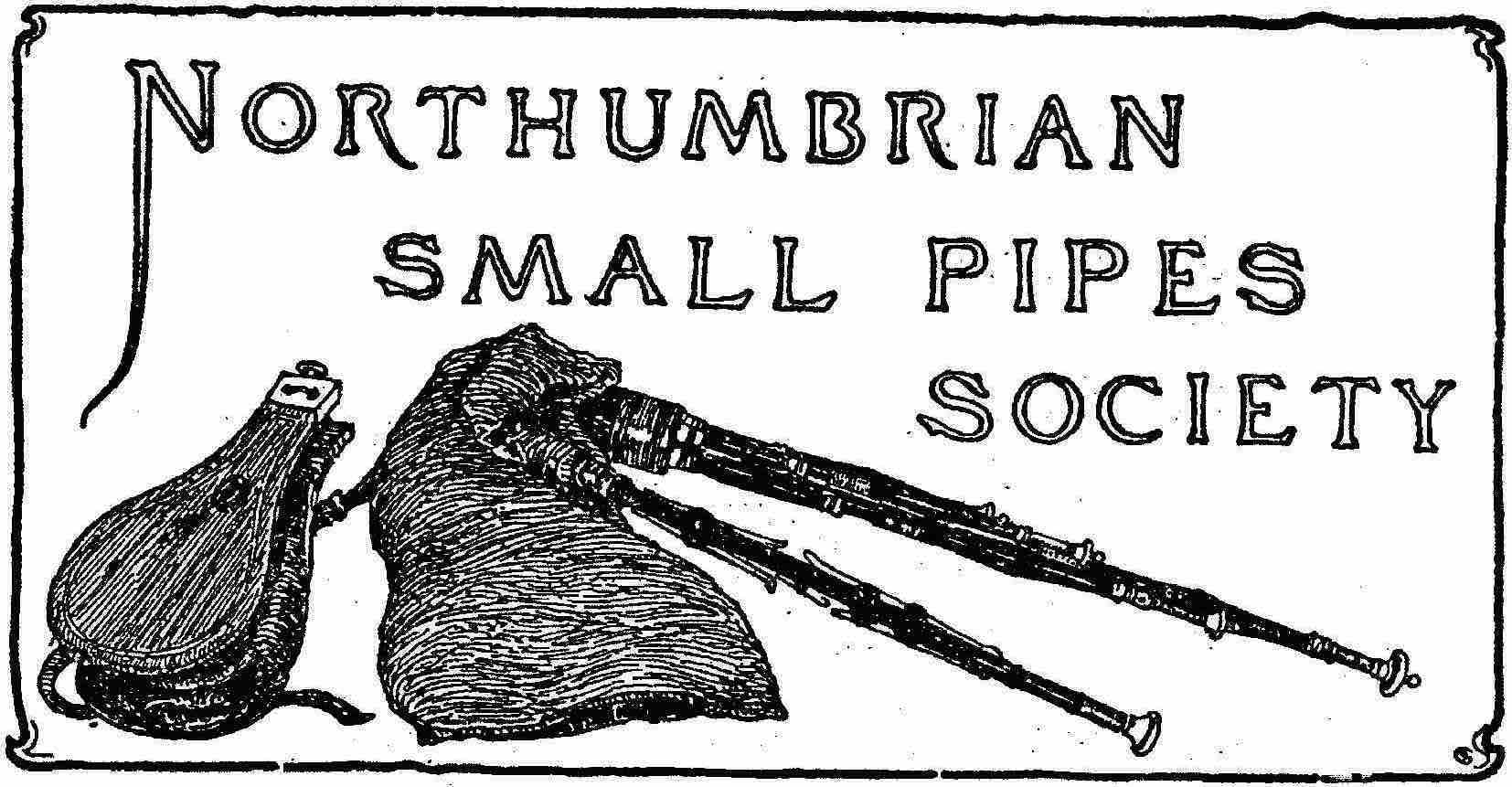
Northumbrian Small Pipes Society logo, by C J Spence c.1894

The Northumbrian Small Pipes Society was founded in 1893, by members of the Society of Antiquaries of Newcastle upon Tyne to promote interest in, and playing of Northumbrian smallpipes, and their music. As it only continued in existence for seven years, it is now regarded primarily as a short-lived precursor to the Northumbrian Pipers' Society. However, despite its short life, it played a significant role, publishing the first tutor for the instrument, J. W. Fenwick's Instruction Book for the Northumbrian Small-Pipes (1896), holding regular meetings, and organising annual competitions. In 1894 and 1896–7, the society published Transactions, as well as publishing an account of their Annual Meeting of 1897. As well as Members, who paid an annual 5s. subscription, there was a category of Honorary Playing Members. Since the society's records include the names and addresses of all members, of either kind, they have listed the names and addresses for 37 known pipers. Two articles in the Newcastle Courant, in April 1900, gave an account of their Annual General Meeting, at the Literary and Philosophical Society, and referred to the society as flourishing, with 200 members, of whom almost half were pipers. Officers were elected for the following year; however there is no subsequent record of any formal activity of the society, such as meetings or competitions. In 1906, when the Cloughs played for King Edward VII at Alnwick Castle, an account of this in the Berwickshire News stated that the Northumbrian Small Pipes Society had done some good work in reviving interest, but that 'seven winters had passed without it giving any signs of life'. This suggests that the society had been largely inactive for some time before its final AGM.

The same week as the final meeting, a group of pipers, including Henry Clough and Richard Mowat, organised a gathering of pipers and their friends at The Black Horse in Monkseaton, showing that pipers themselves had begun to organise events in parallel to the society; the 1900 meeting was chaired by Walter Corder, secretary of the NSPS. This was the second such meeting, the first having been the previous May. These events were described as 'annual', but there are no subsequent newspaper accounts of these until an informal gathering there in 1906.

== Historical context ==
The late 19th century in Northumberland was a period of growing interest in Northumbrian music in general, and the music of the Northumbrian smallpipes in particular. In the 1850s, the Society of Antiquaries had started to collect tune and song manuscripts, and their Ancient Melodies Committee continued its work over the subsequent years. In the 1870s, that Society organised annual piping competitions, both to encourage pipers, and to reward the ablest among them. In 1882, the Northumbrian Minstrelsy was published, placing some of their researches before a wider public, and the second part of this book was devoted specifically to smallpipe tunes. So by 1893, the intellectual climate was ripe for the foundation of a society specifically devoted to the Northumbrian Smallpipes themselves.

== Membership ==
A large group of the 26 Committee members, only one of whom, J. W. Fenwick, was an Honorary Playing Member, were related to one another, being members of the extended group of Foster, Spence, Corder, and Watson families; a significant group of these were close neighbours in or near Rosella Place, a short Georgian terrace in North Shields. This Quaker family were descendants of Robert Foster, a close friend of Thomas Bewick. Although there is no direct evidence, it is very likely that Robert would have heard the piping of Thomas's son Robert Bewick, and the family's interest in piping, apparent across several generations, may well date from this time.

One significant member was the artist Joseph Crawhall II (1821–1896), who had a deep interest in the culture and music of Northumberland, and had published A Beuk o' Newcassell Sangs in 1888. He had compiled a tunebook for the use of pipers, containing tunes copied from the William Vickers manuscript, as well as tunes from oral tradition, some otherwise unknown. Parts of this are now on the FARNE archive. He corresponded with his friend and collaborator, the illustrator Charles Keene, who was also a Northumbrian piper - letters surviving from Keene to Crawhall confirm that both of them had had dealings with James Reid, the son of Robert Reid, whose business he continued. In one of these letters, Keene refers to seeing the pipes of Tommy Hair, on sale in Reid's shop in December 1873.

Another committee member was Charles James Spence. He was a banker and a serious amateur artist, and an active member of the Society of Antiquaries of Newcastle upon Tyne, being their Curator of Museums from 1890 to 1905. He owned a rare, possibly unique, set of six-drone pipes by Reid, and an illustration of these is the frontispiece of Fenwick's tutor. It is not known whether his interest in these was as an antiquarian, or as a player, but he is not listed as a playing member, suggesting he did not consider himself to be a serious piper. Alternatively, it may be that as a man of some means, he felt obliged to pay the subscription. He designed the medal which was awarded to first prize winners in the society's annual competitions, and the artwork illustrating the society's Transactions. In its lifetime the society awarded two pipers its gold medal; one was Richard Mowat, and the other was Henry Clough.

A cousin of his, Robert Spence Watson had had a strong interest in piping more than a decade earlier, and had donated the Spence Watson trophy, then worth £25, for the series of competitions organised by the Society of Antiquaries in Newcastle Town Hall. This was won outright by Old Tom Clough after three victories, in 1879. Robert's daughter Mary Spence Watson, herself an amateur piper, who had learned from Richard Mowat, corresponded with Old Tom's grandson Tom Clough. That trophy is now in the Morpeth Chantry Bagpipe Museum.

The president of the society was Richard Welford. In 1896 he delivered a lecture to the society on 'The Waits of Newcastle upon Tyne'. As the last of the Waits was John Peacock, Welford must have had at least some interest in Northumbrian pipes. After Fenwick's death, he acquired Fenwick's collection of manuscript music, which still survives, and includes many unusual variants of traditional pipe tunes, some with attributions to named pipers, including Peacock and Robert Reid.

The society's transactions includes addresses of players. These individuals primarily resided in a geographic range extending from mid-Durham, including locales like Willington, Darlington, and Bishop Auckland, to the western areas of Northumberland, reaching Haltwhistle. The region then extended northeastward to encompass the North Tyne Valley, Kielder Water, Bellingham, Wark, Falstone, and further north to locations in north Northumberland, such as Alnwick. The boundary then reversed, moving southward to Morpeth, southeast Northumberland, and Tyneside. Overall, this territory broadly aligns with the boundaries of Northumberland and the eastern part of County Durham. Notably, almost half of the listed players, totaling seventeen, originated from the industrial and mining hubs of Tyneside and southeast Northumberland. Among them, three lived in North Shields, and six were located in mining communities between the rivers Tyne and Wansbeck. This subset of nine players, comprising a quarter of the identified musicians, hailed from the North Shields and southeast Northumberland regions.

== Why was the society so short-lived? ==
The reasons for the society's short life are not documented. However, it is clear that with a committee of 26, only one of whom was an honorary playing member, and only 37 honorary playing members across the lifetime of the society, never more than 35 at any time, it may well be that pipers felt that the work of the society was not really about the living tradition of the instrument as it was currently played, so much as an antiquarian interest in preserving an instrument falsely perceived as being on the point of extinction.

Such attitudes were certainly current when the Northumbrian Pipers' Society was founded, 30 years later, and it is known from Tom Clough's letters that Tom, and perhaps also his father Henry, were initially cautious and even suspicious. Henry was elected by the NPS as one of the vice-presidents, though he did not play a very active role. Certainly the newer Society had much more involvement from pipers themselves; Tom himself acted as a Competition judge in the first three years, though he declined to be a vice-president, stating that doing the work properly would require more of his time than he could spare. It is more likely that his personal disagreements with G.V.B. Charlton, the first president of the new society, played a large role in this decision. Another piper who played a major part in the NPS early on was Richard Mowat, its chairman from 1933 until his death. In the same year, Tom was also elected as a vice-president, as Billy Pigg had been in 1930. The newer society, as its name suggests, thus had far more involvement from pipers themselves than its short-lived predecessor, and this difference may explain why it survived, while the NSPS did not.
