= Bill Hedworth =

English maker of Northumbrian smallpipes

William Hedley Hedworth (14 Aug 1901–18 Dec 1994) was a noted maker of Northumbrian smallpipes who for a period between about 1950 and the mid-1960s was the only significant maker of new instruments; he continued making sets of pipes until late in his life. He was thus of considerable importance in maintaining the availability of instruments for beginners, particularly at a time when the traditions both of making and playing the instrument were in decline.

== Biography ==
Hedworth was born into a family business, building racing skiffs on the Tyne, but trained as a pattern maker, and as a young man played first classical piano and then violin. Uncertainty of employment meant that he later qualified as a teacher in both woodwork and metalwork, becoming a registered silversmith in 1946. This variety of skills meant that he was well qualified to attempt the manufacture of a number of different musical instruments over the years, as well as numerous other items, from church silver to furniture and coffins. For fifteen years he taught silversmithing at Newcastle. The first Northumbrian pipes he heard were played by Tom Clough, at a demonstration after a competition, but it was around the late 1940s before he decided to try to make a set. One of his metalwork pupils turned out to be Alan Hall, then the secretary of the NPS, and he allowed Bill to measure his own set. Encountering trouble with reedmaking (a not uncommon dilemma), he contacted Jack Armstrong for assistance, and the two became friends, Jack sending people to Bill if they were seeking pipes or needing repairs. He later taught silversmithing to Colin Ross (pipemaker).

Bill kept records of the sizes and other details of all the pipes that were brought to him for repair. Using charts that he made up from this very variable information to inform his own designs, he devised his own standardised hole spacings for a variety of pitches. Some of the first concert pitch chanters are of his manufacture.

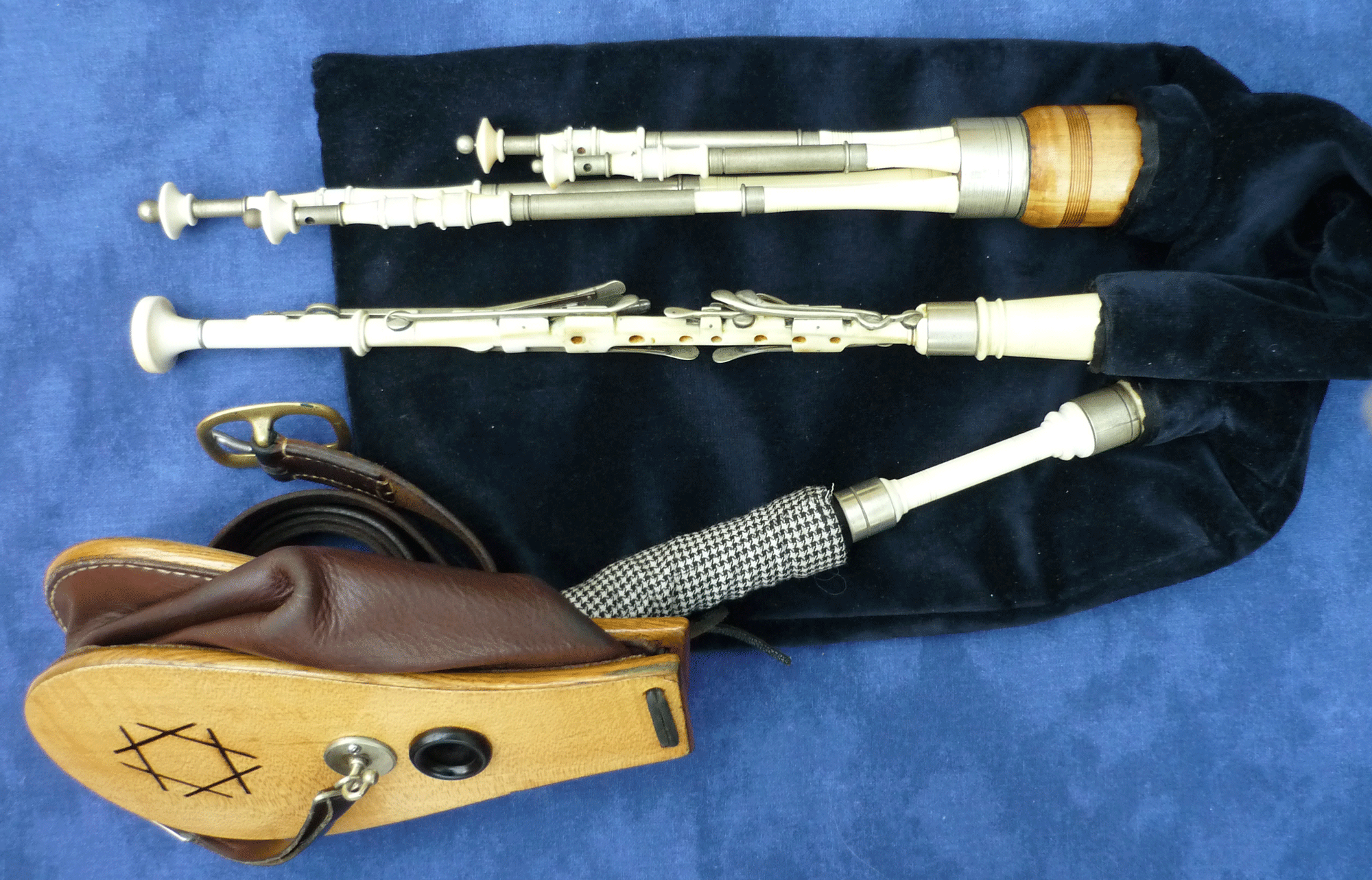
This is an ivory set of pipes in G, belonging to Anthony Robb, made by Bill Hedworth around 1980. The distinctive key shape is characteristic of sets made by Hedworth.

Hedworth pipes later became a very recognizable style in pipemaking, with elegant keys and metalwork of nickel silver, but Bill freely admitted he was no piper, and found difficulty tuning and setting up the pipes himself. Frequently they needed the attentions of other makers before their excellent tone was fully evident. He used a variety of woods in his work, but favoured African blackwood and lignum vitae, as well as ivory when he could get it economically. Many piping competitions in the 1970s and 80s were won on Hedworth pipes, and in total he made about 360 sets.

Towards the end of his long life he made fewer pipes, partly because his favoured metal, nickel silver, became almost impossible to obtain; but until his death he never ceased doing craft work, to the consternation of friends and visitors who saw only his shaking hands and sharp tools. His appreciation of the value of his work remained firmly stuck in the past, to the good fortune of some lucky customers.

Bill Hedworth was proud of having been made an Honorary Member of the Northumbrian Pipers' Society in 1972, and he is remembered by the NPS as an innovative and creative designer of Northumbrian pipes.

In 2014, a book on his work was published by the Northumbrian Pipers' Society.
