= Henry Atkinson manuscript =

Early violin tunebook from Northumberland

The Henry Atkinson manuscript is an early violin tunebook written in Northumberland. It is the earliest fiddle tunebook to have survived from Northern England, and hence an important source for Northumbrian music in the late 17th century. The title page carries the inscription, in a fine hand, Henry Atkinson, his book, 1694. 1694 is presumably the date the book was begun. A small 5 is apparently written below the 4, suggesting that the book was continued into the following year.

== The man ==
Matt Seattle has written that elsewhere in the book there also appear the names Ralph Atkinson and Elinor Atkinson, suggesting a tentative identification of the book's compiler as one Henry Atkinson, a hostman (coal factor) of Newcastle. He had been enrolled as an apprentice in April 1686, where it is recorded that his father, also Henry, was a yeoman of Gateshead, then in County Durham. He completed this apprenticeship in February 1694, when he was admitted to the guild of hostmen, and in July of the same year he married Eleanor Forster. The couple had two children, Ralph (1696-1701) and Mary (1698- 1706), and Eleanor died in 1706. A grandson of this Henry by his second marriage to Margaret Lawson was also named Ralph; Henry died in 1759, at the age of 89. Julia Say has checked that the signature on his will matches writing in the manuscript, confirming that he was its compiler. He belonged to a family of merchants, many called Ralph or Henry, who had been living in Newcastle and Gateshead since before 1603. The family later became very prominent, two of Henry's grandchildren, by his second marriage, being Lord Stowell and Lord Eldon.

Some time after the death of Henry's grandson Ralph in 1827, the manuscript passed into the possession of William Andrew Chatto who added his own name to the title page in 1834. He also annotated some tune titles, pasted in some newspaper cuttings, and wrote elsewhere that Henry Atkinson "was a native of Northumberland, and lived in the vicinity of Hartburn". This statement seems to have been a misunderstanding on his part. While Ralph Atkinson did live in Angerton Hall, near Hartburn, he only acquired this property from the Earl of Carlisle later in the 18th century, after Henry's death. The identification of Henry places him firmly in the urban middle class of Newcastle and Gateshead, rather than rural Northumberland.

Some years after Chatto had acquired it, the manuscript was in the possession of the composer Sir Henry Bishop, Heather Professor of Music at Oxford. After his death in 1855, it was given to the Newcastle Society of Antiquaries in 1857. This was shortly after the Society's Ancient Melodies Committee had begun collecting early manuscripts of local music.

== The manuscript ==
There is more than one handwriting in the manuscript, both for the music and for titles - compare for instance Chickens and Sparrow Grass and Flower of Yarraw. There is also considerable variability in the accuracy of the notation, so that whereas some tunes are meticulously detailed, showing bowings and ornaments, others are very vague and inconsistent as to barring and note durations. One idiosyncrasy is a tendency to leave dots off notes that should be dotted - however this rarely obscures the sense. He also tended to show key signatures redundantly, so that G major is indicated with 2 sharps, for both high and low f sharp, which was conventional enough at this time.

The manuscript is now in the possession of the Society of Antiquaries of Newcastle upon Tyne, and is held at Northumberland Archives. Much of it may be viewed online on the FARNE archive, with some notes by Matt Seattle, at http://www.asaplive.com/archive/index.asp. Some 13 of the tunes were transcribed in detail, including the bowings and ornaments, in Seattle's book Morpeth Rant, now unfortunately out of print.

== The music ==
The book contains over 200 tunes, including early versions of several characteristic north-eastern and Border tunes, about one third of them untitled, and many unidentified. They include early versions of several characteristic local tunes. Among these are Brave Willie Forster which is now used for the song Bobby Shaftoe. Another is Flower of Yarraw which since the Jacobite uprisings has been known in Northumberland as Sir John Fenwick's the Flower amang them. The collection also includes two distinct variation set versions of Gingling Geordie, a tune which survives to this day as the long variation set for Northumbrian smallpipes Wylam Away. The tune I was young and lusty when I kent ye appears again, in a different mode and with variations for Border pipes, in the William Dixon manuscript from 40 years later; its title survives in the lyric of the song Sair fyel'd hinny, which is still sung in the region today, though to a different melody; the old tune does fit the lyric. Some 17 of the tunes are explicitly identified as 'Scotch', or have Scottish titles, while numerous others are also found in sources from north of the border. One of the tunes, an unnamed common-time Scots measure, appears again as the Shepherd's Hornpipe in Robert Bewick's manuscripts, where it seems to be derived from an Irish version, and it still remains current in Northumberland - Billy Pigg recorded a Scottish version of it, The Cairdin' o't. Many of the tunes are explicitly in fiddle settings, with the bowings and ornaments clearly marked; Prince Eugin's March has extensive double stoppings, and another, London's loyalty, is an early example of scordatura notation. Some pieces are related to tunes recently published or composed in London - a few of these are attributed to named composers, including Purcell. Some other tunes, though written out for fiddle, are apparently pipe tunes, with their characteristic 9-note range and figuration: Curds and Whey, "Saw yee not my Meggy" and The Lad that keeps the Cattle are examples of this type.

== Concordances ==
The manuscript is particularly informative in that it contains tunes found in contemporary and later collections, but often in distinct variants. Curds and Whey, with 3 distinct strains here, appears in a similar version with more variations, in the George Skene manuscript, written in Aberdeenshire some 20 years later, there called Wat ye what I got late yestreen; in The Northern Minstrel's Budget a verse list of tunes from the early 19th century, the title of this appears as And I got yesternight curds and whey, suggesting that Atkinson's and Skene's titles are both fragments of the same lyric. Another tune in the book, The Reed House Rant, here with 8 strains, also appears elsewhere - Playford printed a different variant as "A Jig divided 12 ways", while it appeared again half a century later as an Old Lancashire Hornpipe in Walsh's Compleat Collection, and later still back in Newcastle, as a 2-strain version in the William Vickers manuscript. Another tune in the manuscript, a triple-time hornpipe called Uncle John seems to be connected, melodically, harmonically and structurally, with Madam Catbrin's Hornpipe, from Marsden's collection of 1705. The detailed relationships between many of the tunes in this manuscript and tunes in other roughly contemporary sources from both sides of the border remain to be explored more fully.

== Dating ==
Some of the tunes were very new at the time the book was being written - Boyne, a new Jock March presumably commemorates the Battle of the Boyne in 1690, and England's Lamentation for the late Q. Mary was certainly written after her death at the end of 1694. The manuscript includes a version of Purcell's Britons, Strike Home!, from Bonduca which was first performed in October 1695, and which Atkinson presumably copied out after this point. Several of the tunes are similar to versions published by Playford in 1698, but may have been circulating aurally before publication. Other tunes are of Lowland Scottish origin, and are found in similar versions north of the border. Where must our Goodman lie, perhaps originally a pipe tune, is found at about the same time in the Balcarres lute manuscript from about 1695 and the George Bowie fiddle manuscript of 1705, both in a more elaborate 6-strain setting by John MacLaughlan, of Edinburgh. An earlier appearance of this tune, though in a somewhat different 2-strain version, was published in 1686 by Playford as The Black and Grey. It may well have been current in oral tradition well before this, however.

The latest date anyone has suggested for any tune in the book, for The Earle of Darwin's Farewell, is 1716, when James Radclyffe, 3rd Earl of Derwentwater was executed for his part in the 1715 rebellion. However, the tune is a happy-sounding D major minuet, so connecting it to Derwentwater's execution seems unlikely. It may, however, be connected to some earlier event in that family's history, perhaps James and his brother being sent to France, and the exiled court of the Old Pretender, in 1702, but in any case its name must definitely post-date the creation of the earldom in 1688.

== Musical forms ==
Many of the musical forms used, popular dances at the time, are no longer common, including 33 minuets, a gavotte, 3 bourees and a saraband. Other forms are less current now than then, including 13 triple-time hornpipes, and some jigs with 4-bar or 6-bar strains, though examples of these are still played in the region. Another form, the Scots measure, of which there are 18 in the manuscript, is no longer found as such, though many such tunes survive as common-time hornpipes, or in Northumberland, as rants. Most of the tunes have relatively few strains, particularly compared with the somewhat later William Dixon manuscript, which has several tunes in common with it; however there are three examples of long variation sets in this collection, all related to versions in Playford's Division Violin, published in 1684. Although the collection is very much of its time, reflecting the fashions and the currently popular tunes of the 1690s, many of the tunes in it still survive in modern versions, and forms current today, such as jigs, reels, common-time hornpipes and slip jigs, are found.
