= Thomas Todd (piper) =

Thomas Todd (c.1832 – 1908) was a player of the Northumbrian smallpipes, considered by William Cocks to be 'of highest rank'. One account, from 1890, states that he learned the pipes from Thomas Hair, a blind piper and fiddler of Bedlington, who also taught Todd's contemporary, Old Tom Clough. A photograph of him is in the Cocks Collection, and was visible online. It is known that Todd taught the pipers Tom Clough and Richard Mowat to play, as well as Mary Anderson, known as 'Piper Mary'. W. A. Cocks later noted that she was herself 'well known in her day as a piper of the first order'.

== Biography ==
Todd can be tracked throughout his life through census records. He seems to be the same as the Thomas Todd who appears in 1841 in Longframlington, apparently aged 7; later census appearances are largely consistent with this, but with his being born in 1832, and there is a record of a Thomas Todd being baptised in Longframlington in 1832; later appearances show that he was a miner, living in pit villages in the Bedlington area, first Nedderton (sometimes called Netherton), later Bedlington itself, then Choppington Station, Northumberland. A vivid contemporary picture of the Choppington area is found online.

William Cocks noted that he was a favourite piper of Dr J. Collingwood Bruce, one of the editors of The Northumbrian Minstrelsy, and that he played at Bruce's lectures, for instance in 1888. He also played at the Crystal Palace, in London, and, late in his life, at the Riding of the Bounds, in Morpeth, in 1889; a photograph, one taken on this occasion, are in the Cocks Collection, and may be viewed at the Woodhorn archive website.

He lived in or near Choppington for most of his adult life, but a few months before his death, he moved to live with his son-in-law at Bedlington. He died in July 1908 aged about 76, and is buried at Choppington. His obituary said that around 1880 "he was undoubtedly one of the ablest players of the Northumberland Smallpipes alive ..... His execution was remarkable, but he excelled more in the quality and sweetness with which he embellished the old and now nearly forgotten Northumbrian and Scottish airs". It also states that 'considerably over 50 years ago', he was host of the Shakespeare Tavern in Guide Post, Choppington, where he was certainly living in 1862. As the tavern was sold by auction in March 1860, and again had a different landlord by 1867, it seems he did not make a success of the business. The article continues that "many came long distances to hear him play", and "he played all over Northumberland and in many parts of Durham". One story told by Todd, and recorded in the obituary, and by Cocks, tells that 'Todd once was to play a concert at Allendale and lost his way on the fells. He played his pipes "for company", was heard by a shepherd and rescued.'

== Repertoire ==
On several occasions, Todd is recorded as having played at benefit concerts; one, in Blyth, was for the widow of Mr. William Beadon, a fellow miner who had "distinguished himself at the Hartley Calamity in trying to rescue the miners", one, in Sleekburn, was for the Teachers' Orphan and Orphanage Fund, and another in Cambois, for the widow and family of another miner, Mr. Forster. From these and other reports, as well as competition records, one can get a partial understanding of the kinds of tune he played, and some of their titles. Todd's repertoire included Northumbrian pipe variation sets, such as I saw my love come passing by me, Wylam Away, New Highland Laddie, The Keel Row, Meggy's Foot and Felton Lonnen, Scottish dance tunes such as Monymusk, song tunes such as Caller Herrin, Auld Lang Syne, Last Rose of Summer, as well as more popular pieces, Carnival of Venice, and an aria, Sweet Spirit, Hear my Prayer, from the opera Lurline. In the manuscripts of his pupil Tom Clough, the setting of "The Suttors of Selkirk" is described as the "favourite tune of Thomas Todd". Clough also attributed the last two triplet variations on "Corn Rigs" to Todd, but this must be an error on Clough's part, for almost identical variations are found in the John Hall manuscript, dated 1833; Todd was born in about 1832. This firm but mistaken attribution of the piece to Todd, from his ablest pupil, does suggest that Todd knew, played and taught these variations.

== Competitions ==
He entered the competitions organised by the Newcastle Society of Antiquaries from 1877 onwards, which were won for three years by 'Old' Thomas Clough (II), the father of Henry Clough - Todd was placed second in 1877 and the next two years. He won this competition in 1882, winning the substantial sum of eight guineas, (worth about £750 in 2015, based on RPI). He was later a judge at the Northumbrian Smallpipes Society's Third Annual Contest, 1896, sitting with G H Thompson and Charles F Bowes.

== Compositions ==
He also composed - The Barrington Hornpipe, which requires fluent use of every key on a 7-keyed chanter, is his, and remains popular today. It is unusual for pipe tunes in G to require all seven keys, including c sharp and d sharp, so it may well have been composed as a test piece. Forster Charlton, who knew Tom Clough, wrote that when learning from Todd, Tom had the ambition to play The Barrington Hornpipe, but at first was forbidden to try it, instead being given exercises to practice on. After mastering these, he was allowed to tackle the hornpipe, and found "he could play'd straight away". A manuscript of a setting in E minor of the jig The Laird of Cockpen, suitable for smallpipes, is marked with his name and address, and is believed to be by him.

His pipes, a fine silver-mounted set in ivory, are in the Cocks Collection, and may also be seen at the Woodhorn museum website.
