= Jack Armstrong (piper) =

English musician (1904–1978)

Jack Armstrong (May 16, 1904 – September 6, 1978) was a performer on the Northumbrian smallpipes.

Born in Wideopen, North Tyneside, five miles north of Newcastle upon Tyne, in 1904. He and his father, both coal miners, worked at Dinnington colliery, but Jack managed to get a job as a chauffeur shortly after World War I. In 1926 Jack married, and he was living at Skipton in North Yorkshire when he taught himself to play the pipes. His style, influenced by his father's playing, was steady and controlled; he favoured slow airs, which he played on a set of pipes with a rich, resonant tone. This style was in strong contrast to the faster, more virtuosic playing of Tom Clough and his followers, exemplified by Jack's friend and contemporary, Billy Pigg. His repertoire consisted largely of simple dance tunes and slow airs, from Northumberland and elsewhere, the latter often being given local titles. He also composed some tunes in traditional style, some of which are still played.

In an interview recorded in the 1970s, he recalled regular dances at Powburn, led by The Northumbrian Minstrels, Billy Atkinson on melodeon, Jack Thompson also on fiddle, and Bob Clark on drums. Jack was not a regular member of this band, but guested regularly with them. These and others were involved in a concert in Alnwick, which was broadcast live to troops in 1942 - a press cutting relating to this is at. Jack founded a band of his own, The Barnstormers in about 1949. In 1948 Jack was made official piper to the Duke of Northumberland. He held this post for many years, retiring in 1971. He was succeeded by Tom Matthews; a recording featuring both is at. During the 1950s Jack made many recordings, together with The Barnstormers and solo, as well as many broadcasts for the BBC. He recorded a piping album with Patricia Jennings, side one consisting of his solo tracks and side two of pipe duets. Between about 1950 and the folk revival in the 1960s, he was perhaps the most widely known player of the Northumbrian smallpipes, and did much to raise awareness of the instrument.

== Recordings ==
- Northumbrian Minstrelsy (Concert Hall SVSC 2339), 1969.
- Northumbrian Pipe Music (Beltona SEP 43 [ep]), 1969.
- Jack Armstrong, Celebrated Minstrel, Northumbria Vol.1 (Saydisc Traditional Series, Saydisc SCL 252), 1974.
- Northumbrian Pipe Tunes (Folktracks TFSA30.122), nd.
- The Northumbrian Smallpipes (Clock Tower MTN 3073), 1969 (with Patricia Jennings).

== Published compositions ==
- Bracken Rigg
- Rothbury Hills
- Rowantree Hill
- The College Valley Hunt
- Coquet Light
- Kyloe Woods
- Northumbria Rejoices
- Powburn Lads
- Crawley Dene
