= Richard Welford =

British journalist, biographer, local historian, businessman and politician

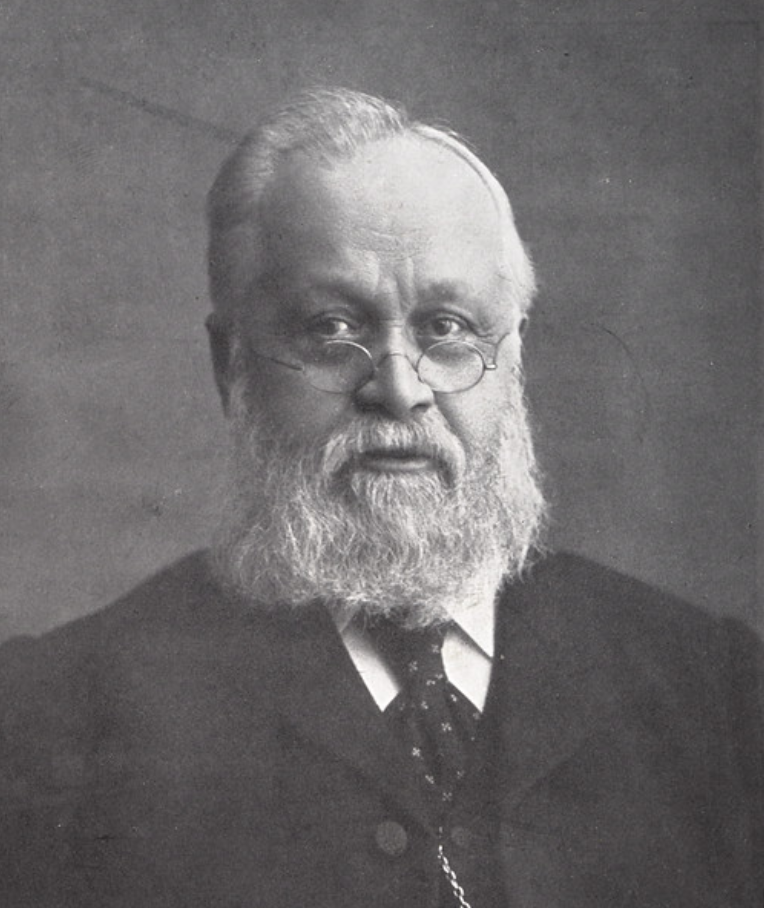
- Born: 1836; Holloway, London, England
- Died: 1919 (aged 82–83)
- Occupations: Journalist; biographer; historian; Businessman; Politician
- Writing career
- Genre: History
- Subject: Newcastle upon Tyne

Richard Welford (1836–1919) was a British journalist, biographer, local historian, businessman and politician associated with Newcastle upon Tyne in the 19th century. He was the author of a number of well-known works of history of the area and of its leading citizens.

== Biography ==
Richard Welford was born in Holloway, London in 1836. He worked in Aylesbury as a reporter for the Bucks Advertiser, before moving to Newcastle in 1854 to work for the Newcastle Chronicle. He was appointed its sub-editor in 1858, a position he held for three years before resigning in 1861 to become a freelance writer. In concert with his writing, he took up, by 1871, a position as secretary of a local shipping company, rising to become managing director of the Tyne Steam Shipping Company. He was active in local politics, serving on the South Gosforth Local Board and acting as a magistrate.

Welford acted as president of the short-lived Northumbrian Small Pipes Society from 1893 to 1900. He inherited J. W. Fenwick's library of documents and manuscript music for the Northumbrian smallpipes upon Fenwick's death in 1907.

The Tyne Tees Steam Shipping Company named a passenger cargo ship commissioned by them from Palmers' Shipbuilding & Iron Co Ltd and launched 6 November 1907, completed February 1908 as Richard Welford.

Welford died in 1919. A bust of Welford is displayed in the Literary and Philosophical Society of Newcastle upon Tyne.

== Works ==
He was the author of:

- A History of the Parish of Gosforth (1879)
- St Nicholas Church and its monuments (1880)
- Pictures of Tyneside Sixty Years Ago (1881) – a reprint from original plates of Pictures of Tyneside Sixty Years Ago by James Wilson Carmichael
- History of Newcastle and Gateshead - written in celebration of the town's elevation to city status in 1882
  - Volume I – 14th and 15th centuries (1884)
  - Volume II – 16th century (1885)
  - Volume III – 16th and 17th centuries (1887)
- Men of Mark 'twixt Tyne and Tweed (1895)
  - Volume 1
  - Volume II
  - Volume III
- Early printing in Newcastle-upon-Tyne (1895)
- Records of the Committees for compounding, etc., with delinquent royalists in Durham and Northumberland during the civil war, etc., 1643–1660 (1905)
- Newcastle Typography and Bibliography, from 1639 to 1800 (date unknown)
