= Will Atkinson (musician) =

English musician (1908–2003)

- Born: 31 January 1908; Crookham, Northumberland, England
- Died: 30 July 2003 (aged 95)

Will Atkinson (31 January 1908 – 30 July 2003) was an English traditional musician from northern Northumberland. He started off as a player of the English diatonic accordion, but was best known as a harmonica or moothie player. His playing was distinguished by a very clear sense of rhythm, with a definite lilt. He was a major figure in Northumbrian music. He was also the composer of several tunes that have entered the tradition and are played at gatherings and sessions.

== Biography ==
Atkinson was born in Crookham, Northumberland in 1908. He worked as a shepherd and as a rabbit-catcher until his retirement, also working at times maintaining road signs. From his youth, until the end of his long life, he was very active and influential in traditional music circles, on both sides of the Border. He had twin sons, of whom George, who died in 1987 aged 53, was also a musician, a noted Northumbrian piper. Will died on 30 July 2003.

== Musical life ==
He came from a musical family - his maternal uncle Geordie Armstrong was, according to Will's cousin Willy Taylor, 'the best fiddler around'. After Will's father was killed in France in 1916, Will and his mother lived with Armstrong, her brother. The musical tradition continued in the family - Will's son George, who died before him, was widely respected as a player of the Northumbrian smallpipes.

In the 1930s he began playing melodeon for dances with Geordie Armstrong and Joe Davidson playing fiddles. He was a founder member of the Alnwick Branch of the Northumbrian Pipers' Society in the 1930s; the Alnwick branch later became the Alnwick Pipers' Society, and Will was its president for many years. Later he formed a band The Northumbrian Minstrels with Jack Armstrong playing fiddle and smallpipes, Jack Thompson on fiddle, Bob Clark on drums and Peggy Clark on piano. This group made some broadcasts for the BBC, including one from Alnwick in 1942 - a press cutting relating to this is at Woodhorn Museum website, where he is shown with a melodeon. They made some recordings at Powburn in 1944 - since rereleased in a compilation by Saydisc SDL 252, together with the piping of Jack Armstrong. These Powburn recordings, together with later recordings, are also available on the FARNE archive.

In the 1950s, Atkinson played with other musicians near Alnwick forming The Cheviot Ranters, a noted dance band in northern Northumberland, but left the group some time later. He also bought a good mouth organ at this time, intending it to be for his son, but liked it so much he kept it himself. He also refined his mouth organ technique after hearing Larry Adler's playing, and mostly played mouth organ subsequently. In 1974 he was one of the artists recorded by Topic, playing mouth organ, on Bonny North Tyne - Northumbrian Country Music. In later life, he recorded many times, chiefly with producer Geoff Heslop. The first release, with his friends Joe Hutton (piper) and Willy Taylor, collectively known as The Shepherds, was Harthope Burn, next came a compilation of Northumbrian Music and Poetry, From Sewingshields to Glendale (with Kathryn Tickell, Alistair Anderson, Mike Tickell, Hutton and Atkinson, etc.) and in 1989 Heslop and Alistair Anderson recorded him in a solo album called simply Will Atkinson - Mouthorgan. This included tunes from various sources, including five of his own compositions. Several recordings of him playing at folk clubs are available on the FARNE archive. When compiling the multi-album anthology The Voice of the People, Reg Hall selected several recordings of Will, which appeared on the record Ranting and Reeling - these included some of the recordings made for Bonny North Tyne, as well as later recordings made with The Shepherds.

== Partial list of compositions ==
- Sharon Davis USA (jig)
- Alistair Anderson's Favourite (reel)
- The Early Morning Reel
- Kyloe Burn (reel)
- Pippa Sandford (jig)
- The Glen Aln Hornpipe
- Anthony Robb (hornpipe)
- The Redeside Hornpipe
- 93 Not Out (jig)
- The Inspiration Waltz (waltz)

== Recordings ==
- Jack Armstrong -Celebrated Minstrel Saydisc SDL 252 (1944)
- Bonny North Tyne - Northumbrian Country Music, Topic 12TS245 (1974)
- Harthope Burn MWM Records 1024 (Produced by Geoff Heslop) (1983)
- From Sewingshields to Glendale MWM Records MWM 1033 (Produced by Geoff Heslop (1986)
- Will Atkinson - Mouthorgan Common Ground CGRCD002 (Produced by Geoff Heslop and Alistair Anderson (1989)
