= G. G. Armstrong =

Northumberland smallpipes player

George Grey Armstrong (1877–1961) was a player, teacher, and maker of the Northumbrian smallpipes. He also composed several tunes for the instrument. He farmed at Bearl, near Bywell, and on retirement lived in Hexham, Northumberland. He learned to play the instrument from the Clough family, and studied pipemaking with John E. Baty. There is a photograph of him playing his pipes, taken by Bert Hardy for Picture Post in 1950.

He taught 36 pupils, including Joe Hutton, Tommy Breckons and Colin Caisley, and passed on his pipemaking skills to William Cocks. Some of his teaching was for Scout troops – the Northumbrian Pipers' Society led a move to introduce the instrument among Scouts in Northumberland between the wars. From the playing of these and other pupils, it is clear that Armstrong must have been not only a fine piper but an excellent teacher. Tommy Breckons recalled learning first from Armstrong, and later from Tom Clough: "Now as to the difference between Tom and George. Tom wouldn't have been much use to a novice piper.... But George had a gift for teaching a novice. He could show you how to do things. I don't quite know how he did it!"

He was widely respected as a pipemaker and repairer, in collaboration with his brother-in-law John MacCalman; the wood and metal parts were turned and shaped by MacCalman, while Armstrong's part of the work was to "assemble the parts, fit the stoppers, tune the chanters, pad the keys, and reed the pipes." In 1936 he repaired an old James Reid set for Joe Hutton to learn on, and subsequently made two complete sets for him, in 1938 and 1943. He also repaired and re-reeded pipes for Billy Pigg and others. He was married to Ella, the sister of William Cocks, the noted pipe-maker and collector. His own 17-key set of pipes, a family heirloom, made by James Reid, is now in the Morpeth Chantry Bagpipe Museum. He used this as the model for the 17-key chanters he made himself.
