= Jim Bryan =

Jim F. Bryan (1931–2009) was a noted player and maker of the Northumbrian smallpipes. His interest in the pipes began in 1950, and he acquired a set of pipes a few years after that. His widow Marion recalled

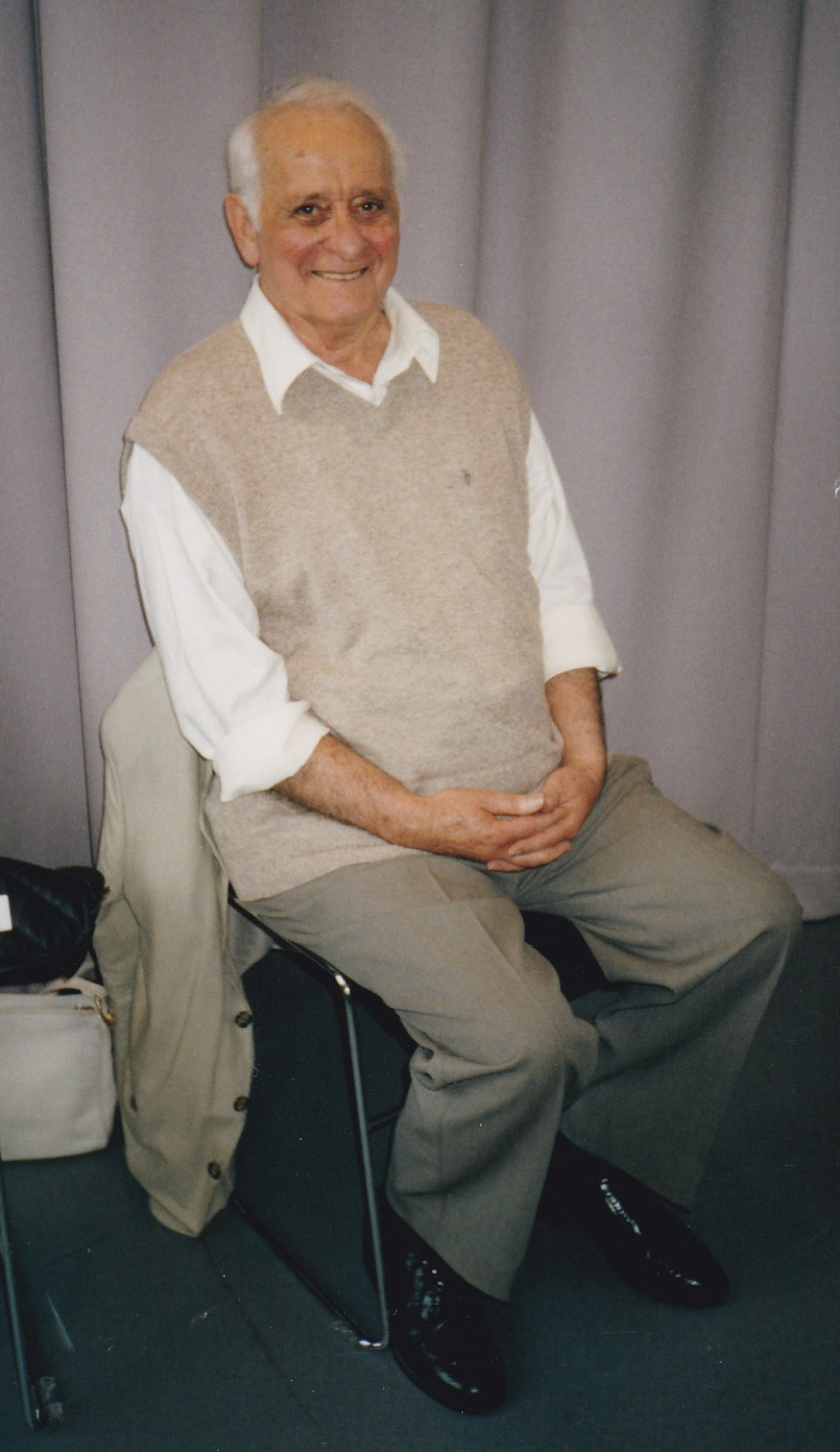
Portrait of Jim Bryan, taken at the NPS President's Day, in Salisbury, 2006

"Jimmy was out walking by himself, which he did very often, in the countryside of Northumberland, and he heard this sound and he went over to hear where it was coming from and it was, as I say, Phillip Foreman playing the pipes. And then Jim said I must have a set but, of course in those days you couldn't just buy them. He didn't know where to start I think Phillip must have helped him. A friend of his got him a chanter, and it was a Reid chanter, and he made some drones for Jim and he got it going."

Bryan served the Northumbrian Pipers' Society first as Treasurer, then as Vice-Chairman (1961–1964) and as Chairman (1964–1968), and, finally, at the end of his life, as President (2006–2009). Bryan had a huge influence on pipemaking, co-authoring with William Cocks a detailed book, on the instrument and its construction. The figures in this book, based on historical examples, were drawn by Bryan. The book played a major role in the revival of interest in playing and in making the Northumbrian smallpipes. His interest in pipemaking continued throughout his life..
