= Dick Hensold =

Dick Hensold (born 16 March 1959) is an American folk musician based in the state of Minnesota. An active promoter of bagpipes, he plays Northumbrian smallpipes, Swedish pipes (säckpipa), medieval great-pipes, reel pipes, Montgomery smallpipes, Great Highland bagpipes, recorder, seljefloyte, low whistle and string bass. He played the Edinburgh Folk Festival in 1994, the Lowland and Border Pipers' Society Collogue (Peebles, Scotland) in 1997, and has taught Northumbrian smallpipes at workshops in the United States, Canada, and Northumberland.

He has also studied Cambodian music for many years, and performs in the ensemble Light From Heaven (formerly called New International Trio), led by Cambodian master musician Bun Loeung until Loeung's death in 2007.

He has released a solo CD titled Big Music for Northumbrian Smallpipes, which includes music written and arranged by him, as well as some traditional tunes.

He studied recorder and early music at Oberlin Conservatory of Music, graduating in 1981.

== Discography ==
- New International Trio (Atomic Theory)
- Way Up North (Hungry Hill Records)
- Piper's Crow (Piper's Crow)
- Big Music for Northumbrian Smallpipes (Ten Thousand Lakes)
