= Richard Mowat =

Richard Mowat or Mowatt (1865–1936) was an award-winning player of the Northumbrian smallpipes.

== Biography ==
A miner, born in Backworth in 1865, Mowat studied the pipes with Thomas Todd, and played in public alongside Old Tom Clough at a concert in 1880. In a competition that December, won by Todd, Mowat was the only beginner to enter, and was awarded a prize of three guineas. In 1882, he entered the open class, and placed second, behind Todd, winning four guineas. He won the Northumbrian Small Pipes Society's piping competitions for three successive years 1894-6, and was subsequently barred from competitions. That society was short-lived, between 1893 and about 1899. In this period it awarded two pipers its Gold Medal; one was Mowat, and the other was Henry Clough. There are several photographs of him in the Cocks Collection; these can be viewed at.

Although Mowat, like his younger contemporary Tom Clough, had studied the pipes with Thomas Todd, he evolved a very different style from the Cloughs' close-fingered playing. He had, contrastingly, an unusual fingering style, occasionally lifting several fingers at a time, and sometimes his entire right hand, particularly on long notes in slow airs, such as Roslin Castle. He was evidently not penalised in competitions for this, as he would be today. Archie Dagg considered Mowat to be one of the best pipers ever, citing his playing of another slow air, "Caller Herrin'". Despite their differing personal piping styles, Mowat and the Cloughs often played together in sessions at 'The Willow Tree' and the Cloughs' home. Billy Pigg learned from Mowat as well as from the Cloughs. In 1906, Mowat was one of the pipers who played on the occasion of the King's visit to the Duke of Northumberland at Alnwick Castle; the others were Henry and Tom Clough, and the Duke's piper, James Hall.

Mowat was chairman of the Northumbrian Pipers' Society from 1933 until his death in 1936. The Society's tunebook was first published at this time; the elaborate 9-strain variation set on Felton Lonnen in that book, distinct from both the Peacock and Clough versions, is taken from his own playing. His repertoire is known to have included Todd's composition The Barrington Hornpipe, the variation sets Holey Ha'penny and Felton Lonnen, and popular tunes such as The Bluebells of Scotland, and The Last Rose of Summer; on one occasion in 1889 he played this last tune as a duet with Henry Clough, while another piece they played together was Caller Herrin. He was also regarded by his contemporaries as an expert reedmaker.
