= Folkestra =

Folkestra, formerly known as FolkESTRA North is The Sage Gateshead’s youth folk ensemble. It was founded in 2002 by Kathryn Tickell, who also served as the musical director. In 2016, Ian Stephenson, a multi-instrumentalist playing folk and traditional music from Northumbria and Scandinavia, replaced Tickell as musical director. Andy May, a piper, worked with Folkestra from 2022, as did Dave Gray, an educator and melodeon player.

They have performed at a wide range of concerts, recorded and published their self entitled album, "FolkESTRA North", and taken part in festivals including the National Festival of Youth Music, Sidmouth International Festival and Towersey Village Festival.

In Easter of 2005, Folkestra took part in a UK tour called "The Road to the North" to celebrate the rich traditional music of the North East of England. They performed here alongside The Kathryn Tickell Band, Alistair Anderson, Louisa Jo Killen, and the Old Rope String Band. With two successful CDs and a growing national reputation, Folkestra has performed at many concerts and festivals across the country, and also at the BBC Proms first ever Folk Day at the Royal Albert Hall. In the summer of 2012, Folkestra is to perform at Traflgar Square in the River of Music festival.

Folkestra's 15 band members play a wide variety of instruments, including fiddles, an accordion, a melodeon, a whistle, a flute, guitars, a saxophone, northumbrian pipes, double bass, voices, and foot percussion.
