= James Hill (folk musician) =

British folk musician (1811–1853)

James Hill (c.1811 – 1853) was a British fiddler-composer and publican. Born in Dundee, his family moved to Newcastle upon Tyne and he lived there or Gateshead for the remainder of his short life. He is famous as the composer of many fine common-time hornpipes for fiddle, including The High Level Bridge, The Beeswing, The Hawk and The Omnibus. He was sufficiently well known that many other tunes by others, such as Blaydon Flats, were also mistakenly attributed to him.

He was of much more than local importance. The Newcastle style of hornpipe, of which he was the best-known exponent, became the model for many later-19th-century examples. Many of his tunes, particularly The High Level Bridge and The Beeswing became well-known wherever hornpipes were played – both of these were published in Ryan's Mammoth Collection, which was first published in Boston in 1884.

A book, The Lads like Beer was compiled by Graham Dixon and first published in the 1990s by Wallace Music. A new revised edition was published in 2013 (Mitchell Music ISBN 978-0-9926696-0-7) with additional information and background to Hill's known compositions and those attributed to or known to be played by him. The Fiddle Music of James Hill (ISBN 0-902510-27-4), a collection of Hill's compositions and other tunes, transposed into keys suitable for Northumbrian smallpipes, has been published by the Northumbrian Pipers' Society. Some of the early manuscript sources for his music may be viewed in facsimile on the FARNE (Folk Archive Resource North East) archive.

== See also ==
- Beeswing (horse), the Thoroughbred race horse after which the hornpipe was named
