= Billy Purvis (Scottish showman) =

Billy Purvis (13 January 1784 – 16 December 1853) was a Scottish entertainer and showman, living in Newcastle upon Tyne. His life is very well documented; his act was regularly mentioned in newspaper articles, for instance a detailed account, including a brief biography, of his performance at Newcastle Races. An autobiography appeared in 1849. Although he could read and write, Purvis speaks in the biography of having a letter written for him by a stationer; so it is not surprising that his 'autobiography' was ghostwritten, by J.P. Robson. Another source is a posthumous biography published by T. Arthur, although the identity of the author is not stated. This states that the earlier autobiography is basically the work of Purvis himself. Although writing two decades after Purvis's death, the author was in contact with his widow, who was still alive. The author had other sources, for instance quoting from correspondence between Sam Bayliss, of Billy Purvis' company, and "T.A.", presumably the publisher. Another source is a detailed obituary of his widow.

== Early life ==
One of twins, Purvis was born in Auchendinny, Scotland on 13 January 1784. Besides his twin brother, he had three other siblings including another pair of twins. The family moved to The Close in Newcastle in 1786. He was still living in the same house in 1849, when his autobiography appeared. Although he travelled widely, "through the greater part of England and Scotland", this house remained his base. At the age of 10 he became a drummer for a militia regiment, "The Newcastle Loyal Independent Gentlemen Volunteers" despite the initial opposition of his parents, who feared he would be transferred to another unit and sent to fight. At the age of 16, he was apprenticed to John Chapman, a carpenter and joiner, and completed his term there. Shortly after beginning this, he also started working in the evenings as a "drummer extraordinaire", in the theatre. He "seldom" let this interfere with his work at Chapman's. He had also begun doing gymnastic tricks, such as standing on one leg on a tightrope, though he was beaten for performing such "mountebank capers" in the workshop. At the theatre, he was given the job of "call boy", and was encouraged in his dancing. He also started performing speeches from the plays, in his broad dialect. He later worked in the theatre as assistant carpenter, shifting scenes. On completion of his apprenticeship, he worked as a carpenter for some years. He married in 1805 - in the 1849 biography he stated "I have been a married man four and forty years". The couple had ten children, eight girls and two boys, but one girl and both boys died in infancy.

== Early stage career ==
He began his independent career as a comic actor, at first as an amateur, staging plays at "The George and Dragon", a public house in Gateshead, and in other venues. Even in straight plays, he would add comic business, for instance once making his character refusing to die when the script required it; such antics got a good reaction, and his career as a clown developed from this. About the age of 24, he succeeded his father, as doorkeeper at the Assembly Rooms in Newcastle, where he learned the fashionable dances of the day. But among his friends, he was performing comic dances and hornpipes. Also about this time, he began working as a dancing master, first teaching a group of butchers, who planned to hold a ball, then subsequently running three classes a night, in a room attached to a public house. At this time he was still keeping on with his trade as a carpenter, though he believed he could by then have lived off his income from the dancing classes. He also began appearing more regularly at public events as a clown, actor, and showman. Some time after this, he became Drum-Major for the Hexham Local Militia, moving with his family to Hexham. He worked here too as a dancing master, and began learning the "Necromantic Art" of conjuring. In 1815, in celebration of the victory at Waterloo, he paraded an effigy of Napoleon, mounted on a galloway, around Hexham, Corbridge and Warden, before hanging him and burning him - "he was suen a' brunt to ashes". He did not get a pound he had been promised for this exhibition, however, and was also sacked from his job as a carpenter. Instead, he organised more dancing classes, at Allendale and elsewhere. Returning to Hexham, he reopened his dancing academy. At some point after this, was hired to play the drum, and find a clarinettist, for an equestrian performance given by a Mr. Powell, at Stagshawbank Fair, near Corbridge. Powell had heard of Purvis's performances as a clown, and when the usual clown in Powell's troupe left, Purvis was engaged to take over, having no regular job at the time. They toured around County Durham and returned to Newcastle - Purvis's family were still in Hexham. The tour continued through Northumberland, including Bedlington, where he became acquainted with Thomas Hair, and on to Edinburgh, and he returned to Hexham some four months after leaving. After this, he decided to move back to Newcastle. He reopened his dancing academy there, in "The Chancellor's Head". He also began to form his own company at this point.

He became very well known throughout the region, at first for his clowning at open air events like Powell's equestrian show, later for more highly developed shows under cover - by 1834, when he was performing at Newcastle Races, he was referred to as "the king of the clan" of conjurors. His performance there took place in a "Grand Pagoda", decorated with Chinese figures. The entrance fee for his show was twopence, while many others charged just a penny. The show was an elaborate one - it included not just Billy, but his own company of actors and his own band.

== Later career ==
At the end of 1836, he opened the Victoria Theatre. This was "It was none of your common concerns, it measured ninety feet in length by thirty in breadth." As it was built of timber, in less than a month, it cannot have been a permanent structure. He undertook not to compete with the Theatre Royal in Newcastle, so the show closed in February 1837, and the company then went on tour.

He seems to have been very well liked by his company; on one occasion, when they were playing in Dundee, he was presented by his company with a silver snuff-box, inscribed

Presented to

WILLIAM PURVIS, ESQ.,

By the Actors of the Victoria Theatre, at Dundee, as a Token of Respect,

for his Perseverance and Benevolence

as a Manager. May 21st, 1842.

== Musical career ==
From his biography we know that he was also a respected player of the Union Pipes. The engraving above shows him playing this instrument. One detail apparent from this, is that the drones were not tuned solely in octaves like the modern instrument, but there were two drones in octaves, and another intermediate drone a fourth or fifth above the bass drone. This corresponds to the drone pattern of earlier "Pastoral pipes", and there are surviving sets of Union pipes in the Morpeth Chantry Bagpipe Museum by Robert Reid, with such drones. There seem to be two regulators, in contrast to modern Irish sets which have three, but he is playing with the chanter stopped on the knee, as with the modern instrument, so these are not Pastoral pipes.

He visited Bedlington, where he played the closing part of an entertainment at the Northumbrian piper and fiddler Thomas Hair's public house, the Blue Bell. This was relatively early in his career, after 1815 but before 1818. It is stated that Billy was made very welcome there, and that Hair "was much taken with my Union pipes and my manner of playing them", so it seems he was well respected as both a musician and an entertainer. Purvis says he spent 'many a happy night' there, so he must have been a regular visitor. He was welcome too; Hair gave him the best room free, which he would not normally let out to anyone. Purvis's act became very popular, so he would have brought a good, and no doubt thirsty, crowd to The Blue Bell.

On another occasion, in Blanchland, on playing to the clergyman, Mr. Ireland,

"My union pipes delighted him very much, as I played several of his favourite airs with great effect. To this instrument I am greatly indebted; not only for the harmony it is capable of producing mechanically, but also to the chords of friendship which it has been the means of awakening in the human heart, and to the sympathies which its notes have engendered — sympathies which I trust may always exist even after the chanter of Billy Purvis has ceased to sound."

The pipes were an important part of his act:

"When we arrived at any place, and could procure a large room in the locality suited to our purposes, we played what we termed 'inside business', which comprised my wonderful exhibitions of conjurations, comic singing and recitations, hornpipe dancing; together with the great attraction of my union pipes."

His piping was also appreciated in Scotland - on one occasion he played for Mr. Forest, a musician and gunsmith in Jedburgh, who on seeing that he played this instrument, "his countenance brightened, and harmonious feelings seemed to be dancing about the corners of his lips, and sparkling in the dilating pupils of his eyes. He informed me, that he was a great admirer of the instrument.... My pipes were in beautiful tune, and I succeeded in making a favourable impression on the minds of my delighted and complimentary company. I have often been astonished to find that the Union Pipes were such strangers in Scotland. It is an instrument well suited for the performance of Scottish Melodies, especially those of the minor or plaintive description. The beautiful harmony produced; the sweet and melancholy appealings of the upper notes, and the subdued tones of the chanters, render the Union Pipes infinitely superior to the Scotch bagpipe; the screaming. screeching, tearaway yells of which, resemble the wild wailings of some angry hurricane or, to use a more humble figure, the caterwauling of a thousand ill-conditioned cats." On another occasion he played for a dinner party hosted by Sir Walter Scott - Scott had also engaged two Highland pipers, who "paraded up and down the room giving vent to their unearthly music, and screaming out their tunes in such a horrid way that put a stop to all familiar conversation".

It is not known for sure who made his pipes, but he does state that he went to get them repaired by 'Mr. Reed of North Shields' who made Union pipes as well as Northumbrian pipes; it is likely he would have had them repaired by their maker. Given the apparent date of this, around 1840, "Mr. Reed" would have been James Reid, who continued the business of his father Robert.

One indication of Purvis's fame at this late stage in his career, is that a horse named "Billy Purvis", owned by a Mr. Stebbings, ran in numerous races, for instance in 1846.

== End of his life and posthumous reputation ==
In 1849, as an old man, saying "my strength begins to fail", "he gave material into the hands of Mr. J. P. Robson to write his autobiography, paying him £20 for the undertaking. It was first issued in twopenny numbers, and went like wildfire, the first buyer being Mr. W. Campbell, bootmaker, Dean Street, who requested Purvis to write his autograph in it. Many buying the numbers were not particular whether they gave Purvis pennies or half-crowns for them, in such esteem he was held." Robson was careful to write in his subject's own voice; the style of Purvis's distinctive stage patter would have been very recognisable to his fans. The book is written, roughly in chronological order, though largely undated; Purvis is telling us, through Robson, the story of his own life, rather than Robson writing about Purvis in the third person.

Also in this 1849, playing at Sunderland Fair, "in fine feather", "his terms were high", as he was charging the relatively large sum of 6d for admission to the pit of his theatre, but still attracting a good audience, in a year when trade at the fair was slack.

He died on 16 December 1853, in Hartlepool, at the Angel Inn, with his family around him. He seems to have been in some poverty towards the end of his life; his company had struck for wages the previous month, and in consequence he got no income from the Fair at Newcastle, and his obituary refers to him dying "with an empty pocket and heavy heart", and his widow's obituary refers to him being broken in "body, spirit and fortune". He was buried in St. Hilda's churchyard in Hartlepool, "in a stranger's grave". At his funeral, "his remains were followed to the grave by members of the Masonic and Oddfellows' lodges to which belonged, the company of his theatre, and a host of others". Six and a half years later, a stone was erected to mark the grave, the cost being met by the proceeds of a benefit performance given by Messrs. Sanger's company. An image of his gravestone is at the Houghton Le Spring website.

His widow survived him by 27 years, at first living on in the house in The Close. A few years later she was admitted to the Holy Jesus Hospital, then an almshouse, in Newcastle. In 1875, the second biography, published by T. Arthur, appeared, stating "At this time (1875) Mrs. Purvis, in her 89th year, still lives, and is to be found at the Jesus Hospital, Manors, Newcastle. She is an interesting old lady, and ought not to be forgotten in her great age. Whoever publishes a life of Purvis ought to take care that Billy's widow shall share in the profits." This suggests that one motive for writing this second life was for the benefit of Mrs. Purvis.

She died, still in the Jesus Hospital, on 9 November 1880, at the great age of 94. In a death notice, Billy was still remembered as "the famous showman of the north". The same account was also printed in papers in London and in Dundee, indicating the extent of his fame, almost three decades after his death. A more detailed obituary of her appeared in By this time only two of her family remained alive. One daughter was married, but Bella, the other, was single, and "attended to every want of her ancient parent". On her 94th birthday, 23 October, she appeared hale and well, but shortly afterwards, she fell ill, and died.

== Re-enactments ==
Purvis's act has been re-enacted by several people over the years.

In 1886, in Tynemouth, there was a "Grand Revival of the Original BILLY PURVIS'S Show", featuring "20 Star Variety Artistes, Military Band, and Dancing." His name was clearly a strong selling point more than three decades after his death.

Comedian Joe Ging recreated Billy Purvis in the 1980s, and the costume is now held by the Tyne & Wear Museum Service.

Since 2009, Billy Purvis has been re-enacted at carnivals and fetes, including Houghton Feast in Houghton-le-Spring, by local historian Paul Lanagan.
