= Joe Hutton (piper) =

Northumbrian smallpipe player and fiddler

Joe Hutton (August 16, 1923 – July 17, 1995) was a Northumbrian smallpipe player and fiddler.

== Life and career ==
Hutton was born in Halton Lea Gate, near Haltwhistle in the west of Northumberland. Like his father, Jake, he was a shepherd, and a musician - he started on the fiddle, but took up the Northumbrian smallpipes after hearing P.J. Liddell and G.G. Armstrong playing at a concert in 1936. He started on a James Reid set from Halton Lea Gate, refurbished by G.G. Armstrong, a noted piper from Hexham, and he took lessons in the instrument from Armstrong. He made rapid progress, and won a competition as a novice, the following year. Armstrong made him a new set of pipes in January 1938, and Joe was photographed, standing at the left, with other competitors at the Bellingham Show piping competition in 1938. He continued to play the fiddle at dances during the war years, but he continued piping, upgrading to a 17-keyed chanter, again by Armstrong, in 1943. In 1950 he began piping in competitions again, winning all the Open competitions for two years. He was very isolated living out on the border with Cumberland, and to play with Tommy Breckons, a noted piper from Bellingham, he recalled "it meant walking 8 miles to Gilsland, bus to Hexham, another bus to Bellingham....Man, it was a day's work getting there". On another such piping trip, to Carrawbrough on the Roman Wall, he met his future wife, Hannah, whose brother John was also a piper.

In 1955, he obtained, from Tommy Breckons, a fine 17-keyed ivory and silver set of pipes. These had previously belonged to P.J Liddell, and are widely believed to have been made by T. Errington Thompson, of Sewingshields, about 1870. He played this set, the first set he had ever heard, for the rest of his life. In 1978, he retired from farming and settled in Rothbury, in the centre of the county. This enabled him to concentrate much more on piping, at a time of growing interest in the instrument and its traditional music.

== Repertoire ==
His playing was largely based around dance music, mostly from Northumberland as well as Scotland and Ireland - later on he added tunes from Shetland, Canada and the USA. His playing of hornpipes was excellent as a model, with a clear and steady pulse, and tasteful but relatively sparse ornamentation. His playing of slow tunes, such as the Irish slow air 'Boulavogue' was much more ornate, though without obscuring the shape of the tune. His style was far less complex and ornate than Billy Pigg's, but notable for its rhythmic drive; in his early career, he had played a lot for dances, and throughout his career, he played duets with fiddlers. His earliest recordings, such as Roxburgh Castle which appears on the LP Holey Ha'penny, which must show the greatest influence of his teacher G.G. Armstrong, are remarkable for their precision. His piping has thus been very influential, being highly accessible to learners, but a fine example for them to follow.

== Recordings ==
Some early recordings of the playing of various Northumbrian musicians, including Joe and his father, were made in the summer of 1954 for the BBC by Peter Kennedy; these were later compiled into the disc Holey Ha'penny Topic 12T 283 (1976). In 1959, Joe, with his wife Hannah, moved to Rowhope, at the head of Coquetdale, close to the Scottish border, where he farmed for the next 17 years. In 1973 the Northumbrian Pipers' Society and Topic Records recorded a selection of Northumbrian pipers, including Joe, on The Wild Hills o' Wannie 12TS 227(1973), and another recording featuring Joe, again from Topic, is Bonny North Tyne 12TS 239 (1974). In retirement after 1978, he continued to play, making a solo record Joe Hutton of Coquetdale MWM Records 1024(1980). Together with the fiddler Willy Taylor, and Will Atkinson (musician) on moothie (mouth organ), they performed as The Shepherds, making a recording Harthope Burn MWM Records 1031 (1983); both records were produced by Geoff Heslop. Other non-professional recordings of him may be found on the FARNE archive, and the British Library sound archive.

== Influence ==
In 1975, as Joe approached retirement from farming, he agreed to start teaching weekly evening classes in Northumbrian smallpipes in Rothbury, which continue to this day. Joe, along with the pipemaker David Burleigh and others, was one of the founders of the Rothbury residential piping course, which began in 1979 and was always known as Joe's Course. This course has had a considerable influence, enabling many people from outside the county to study the smallpipes intensively.

In 1979, the Northumbrian Pipers' Society granted him Honorary Membership, in recognition of his services to piping.
