= William Alfred Cocks =

English clock maker

William Alfred Cocks (1892-1971) was a master clock maker from Ryton, County Durham. He had a lifelong interest in the history and culture of the North-east of England, and particularly in the Northumbrian smallpipes and half-long pipes. He assembled a large collection of historic bagpipes, their music, and related materials, which forms the core of the collection now housed at the Morpeth Chantry Bagpipe Museum. He was elected to the Society of Antiquaries of Newcastle upon Tyne in 1920, remaining a member until his death. In 1928, he was one of the earliest members of the Northumbrian Pipers' Society, being elected one of the technical advisers, with responsibility for smallpipes. He became a Vice-President of the Society in 1938. When an exhibition of historic pipes was held in the Black Gate Museum in 1961, most of the exhibits were from Cocks's collection.

He was a pipemaker and author: his Tutor For The Northumberland Half Long Pipes was published by the Oxford University Press in 1925, The Northumbrian Bagpipes: their development and makers was published by the Northumbrian Pipers' Society in 1933. Later, in his life, together with J.F. Bryan, he wrote a detailed book of instructions for pipemaking The Northumbrian Bagpipes, which was published by the Northumbrian Pipers' Society in 1967. The latter book, in particular, played a large part in promoting the revival of pipemaking.

He corresponded widely about the pipes, in particular with the organologist Anthony Baines about historic instruments and with the piper Tom Clough on playing style.

On his death, the bagpipe collection, books, music manuscripts and photographs were left to the Society of Antiquaries; they were at first housed in the Black Gate Museum, but moved to the Morpeth Chantry Bagpipe Museum in 1987. The collection is a major resource for the study of Northumbrian pipes, their music, and history.

== Bibliography ==
- A Tutor for the Northumberland Half-Long Bagpipes, 1925, Oxford University Press
- The Northumbrian Bagpipes: Their Development and Makers, 1933, Northumbrian Pipers' Society
- The Northumbrian Bagpipes, with J.F. Bryan, 1967, Northumbrian Pipers' Society
