= Henry Clough =

Henry Clough (1855 – 1936) was an English player of the Northumbrian pipes, or Northumbrian smallpipes. He was a miner, listing his trade as a hewer, and he lived in Newsham, in south-eastern Northumberland. He was the father of Tom Clough, 'The Prince of Pipers'. Several previous generations of the family had also been pipers, Henry's father, 'Old Tom' (1830-1885), and grandfather Henry (1789-1842) among them. Since the instrument assumed its modern keyed form at the beginning of the 19th century, the family's playing tradition goes back unbroken to that time. There is a photograph of Henry with his son; there is also a photograph of Henry, his son Tom (III), and grandson Tom (IV) playing at Bellingham Show in 1926.

== Music ==
Some tunes from his music manuscripts can be found on the FARNE archive, together with those of his son, and an authoritative book on the family and its music, based on the collected manuscripts, was published by the Northumbrian Pipers' Society as The Clough Family of Newsham. These sources give considerable insight into the traditional playing technique and style of the instrument. Henry and his son were both fine solo pipers, regularly winning competitions, Henry being one of the Gold Medal winners in the Northumbrian Small Pipes Society's competitions in the 1890s. Henry was an expert duet player, both with Richard Mowat, and later with his son Tom. Henry and Tom's duet playing was said to be superb - a showpiece was Sir Sidney Smith's March; a duet setting of this tune is found in Tom's manuscripts. However Henry's playing, unlike his son's, was never recorded.
