= Old Tom Clough =

English player of the Northumbrian pipes (1828–1885)

Old Tom Clough (1828 – 1885), was an English player of the Northumbrian pipes, or Northumbrian smallpipes. He was born into a family of miners who had also been pipers for several generations; his son Henry, grandson Tom, and great-grandson 'Young' Tom were pipers too. He is thus a central figure in a family tradition linking the earliest days of the modern instrument to almost the present day.

'Old Tom' is the first of the family whom we know much about. He was, like all of his family, a pitman, initially working at Old Hartley, where his father Henry also worked. Henry played both Union pipes and Northumbrian smallpipes, and parts of his Union pipes still survive, while his 9-key set of smallpipes by Robert Reid remained in the family's possession into the 20th century. Tom later moved to Newsham, being hired as a sinker in 1849, working on the Cowpen 'C', or 'Isabella' pit which was begun in October 1848. A sinker was a specialist in the sinking and lining of new pit shafts, a skilled and dangerous trade, and relatively well paid. He gave his occupation, more generically, as 'pitman' when he married in 1850. His wife, Jane Brown, was the daughter of Jane Frost, the landlady of The Willow Tree, then the only public house in Newsham. He was also, nearer the end of his life, after the pit where he worked was laid idle, himself the landlord of The Willow Tree. A 4/4 hornpipe believed to have been composed by him is entitled 'The Willow Tree', and appears in his grandson's manuscripts.

Tom (II) learned the pipes, not from his father, but from Thomas Hair, a blind piper and fiddler, innkeeper of The Blue Bell inn in Bedlington, who died in 1854. He also learned from one George Nicholson, of Blyth, who may be the man of that name, listed as a retired mariner in the 1891 census return for Morpeth, who was born in Blyth. According to Clough's obituary, the George Nicholson who taught Clough had been away from Blyth for some 25 years, and had only recently returned when Clough was dying. This is consistent with Nicholson being a sailor.

In later life Clough won several competitions, in particular those organised by the Society of Antiquaries in Newcastle Town Hall in 1877, 1878 and 1879 - the first prize in these was the substantial sum of 10 guineas. A photograph of him, taken in 1879, is at. On each occasion Thomas Todd placed second. After his third victory, Clough won, outright, a fine silver cup, then valued at £25, which is now in the Morpeth Chantry Museum. The tunes he played in these competitions were "Wylam Away", "The Duke of Athole's Pibroch", "Felton Lonnin", "Jackey Laton", "Little wot ye wha's coming", and "New Highland Laddie", all long variation sets, which are later found in his grandson's repertoire. The last of these was also said by his grandson to be the last tune he ever played in public. Other tunes in his repertoire were, according to his grandson, "Old Tom's Rant", played by him regularly, "Jockey lay in the Hayloft", a great favourite of his, and Old Tom is said to have composed some of the family's distinctive variation set on "Maggy Lauder". He was debarred from competing after 3 victories, but continued to attend and play. He on occasion played for the Duke of Northumberland and at lectures given by John Collingwood Bruce. In 1881 the census return gives his address as Winship Street, not far from The Willow Tree.

He died in June 1885, and had a substantial obituary, of one and a half columns, in the following week's Morpeth Herald. This confirms that he was a sinker of pit shafts, as others of the family are believed to have been, and lists his piping achievements, as well as stating that, as a young man, he won trophies and very substantial cash prizes (the then huge sum of £50 on one occasion - about a year's wages) for shooting. Another interest was keeping singing linnets - he both entered and promoted competitions for these. He may well be the "old piper ... and splendid performer", who told the young Tom Clough "If you want to be a good piper, listen to a linnet, and make your chanter as clear and as distinct. A linnet never choytes, and neither should a good piper". "Choyting" refers to open-fingered ornamentation as in Highland piping, which the Cloughs regarded as a grievous error. Tom could have been only four years old at most if he heard his grandfather say this in person, but Old Tom, as a linnet fancier, seems the likeliest piper to have made this analogy. Another obituary appeared in the Shields Gazette. It states that his piping was much in demand, and that on one occasion he played for the Duke of Northumberland at Alnwick Castle.

The family must have been affluent at the time of his death, as his grave is marked with a fine Cheviot granite tombstone, which still stands in Blyth Cemetery.
