= Thomas Hair (musician) =

British musician

Thomas Hair (1779 – 1854) was a violinist and player of the Northumbrian smallpipes, who lived in Bedlington. This town, and the surrounding district of Bedlingtonshire, were until 1844 a detached part of County Durham, but were then made part of Northumberland.

He was described in his obituary as suffering sight loss, and by Waddell as 'blind'; his will is signed with a cross, suggesting he was unable to read or write. This seems superficially inconsistent with him subscribing to books of local interest; however, somebody else could have read the books to him.

== Music ==
Thomas taught the Northumbrian smallpipes to both Thomas Todd and Old Tom Clough, to Henry Cotes, the vicar of Bedlington, and to at least one other 'clever pupil', referred to as 'poor blind Tom'. This last pupil may well be Thomas Norman, who was also blind, and who inherited Hair's pipes.

A tune named after him, Thomas Hair's Hornpipe, survives in the notebook of his younger contemporary William Thomas Green (1825–1898), also a piper and fiddler, and may well be Hair's own composition. Hair and Green are likely to have known one another personally, living only six miles apart; as Green's father William was innkeeper of The Seven Stars in Morpeth, and piper to the Duchess of Northumberland, they would have had commercial as well as musical interests in common. As Thomas Hair's Hornpipe begins and ends with the same figure as "Roxburgh Castle", it may well have been composed as a companion piece for that tune.

A local poet and cobbler, James Waddell of Plessey, in 1809, referred to a local vicar (unnamed by him, but elsewhere identified as Rev. Henry Cotes, of Bedlington), who played the pipes, being taught by Old William Lamshaw, who was piper to the Duke of Northumberland, and by the "celebrated blind youth of B-d-n, Thomas Hair". Later, in 1831, John Farrer of Netherwitton wrote a poem, in Standard Habbie metre, which has long been associated with poems about piping, praising Hair's playing of the smallpipes,

....
I've heard the band's harmonious jingle,
Where instruments in concord mingle,
Where ne'er a jar the ears could tingle

Of connoisseurs;

Yet still I like your chanter single

'Yont a' their airs.

I've heard sweet music played on glasses,
Soft as the southern breeze that passes,
Sweet as the Nine sung on Parnassus,

In ancient days;

But still your pipes the whole surpasses,

For lively lays.

I've heard the pretty ladies gay,
On soft pianos sweetly play,
And on guitars their skill display,

to make fine tones;

Yet still I must the preference pay

To your sweet drones.

I like the organ's treble squeel,
Its bass and tenor please me weel,
But on your pipes your matchless skeel

Does please me best –

That music is the nonpareil

Of a' the rest.
....

He contrasts this, strongly, with the playing of an inferior piper, perhaps playing Union pipes, near Netherwitton, saying that this piper would mix up well-known tunes:

....
Yet gin ye ask him he will try
To play "My Love came passing by",
But oft it turns to "Cut and Dry"

Or "Felton Lonning";

Sometimes it's like "The Isle of Skye",

Or "The Campbells coming"

He plays "The Scots came o'er the border"
"The Selkirk Sooters" and "Whigs in order"
But mixes them in sic disorder

Wi' "Fisher lad"

Baith drones and chanter cry out murder,

It's "Music mad".

As Farrer addresses this poem directly to Hair, it is clear he expected him not only to be familiar with these tunes, but that unlike the unnamed Union piper, that he would be able to tell them apart. Most of them are still well known and played; however, "Whigs in order" and "Music mad" are not known nowadays, and are apparently not in any surviving sources.

Hair certainly knew at least one Union piper, the clown Billy Purvis. Purvis's biography states that he visited Bedlington, where he played as a wind-up – the closing part – of an entertainment at the Thomas Hair's public house, the Blue Bell. It is stated that Billy was made very welcome by Hair, and that Hair "was much taken with my Union pipes and my manner of playing them", so it seems he was well respected as both a musician and an entertainer. It is also apparent from this account, that at this time, The Blue Bell was as much a music hall, offering varied entertainments, as a public house – Purvis played the closing part of what must have been a variety show.

Hair had a considerable reputation locally. One article in 1854 on a concert he gave at the Bedlington Mechanics' Institute, refers to him as 'the celebrated Northumberland piper', playing, with a pupil, 'some favourite airs in his usual masterly style'. After the annual Bedlington Hoppings, of 1850, an article referred to him as 'one of the first, if not the first piper in England'. Another sign of his reputation as a local character is that a horse, racing at that event, was called Tommy Hair.

Hair's obituary states "Upon the violin his touching style and purity of tone in his favourite Scotch airs, were seldom surpassed. His loss of sight was counterbalanced by a first-rate ear, exquisite taste, and execution rarely equalled. ... He had the happy gift, when in company, of telling droll anecdotes teeming with the ludicrous, and setting the table in a roar."

In his will, he left his violin to James Coxon of Newcastle, and his pipes to Thomas Norman of North Blyth. Census returns and trade directories show that Norman was a musician and the innkeeper of the King's Head in Blyth; like Hair, he was visually impaired, being listed as 'blind' in the 1861 census. Norman was probably the pupil, 'poor blind Tom', who played with Hair at the Bedlington Hoppings in 1850. In 1851, Norman was visiting Newsham, not far from Old Tom Clough. If he did so regularly, it is probable, though not certain, that these two young pipers, both of them Hair's pupils, would have known each other. It seems much harder to identify the James Coxon who inherited Hair's violin however; the surname is common in the region, and Newcastle was by then a large city. However, in the late 19th century Fenwick manuscript, which came to light recently, there is a jig Yearmouth Lasses, described as coming from the Coxon manuscript dated 1860. Nothing is known otherwise of that source, but it is plausible to argue that it was compiled by this James Coxon. Hair's pipes were on sale in James Reid's shop in late 1873, and were seen there by Charles Keene, himself an amateur piper. He described these pipes as 'a caution', but it is unclear what was odd, or wrong about them. It may just be that they had suffered from neglect for a few years. Norman, who had inherited them, had died in 1867.

== Occupation, standing and wealth ==
At some time before 1825 he became an innkeeper. Many musicians in the area at this time were innkeepers – public houses which provided music were popular, and his pupils Thomas Todd and Old Tom Clough were also innkeepers for a time. Hair was listed in 1825 as an innkeeper, among the subscribers to a history of Northumberland and he also subscribed to a similar book on Newcastle in 1827; three years later in 1828 he was listed as landlord of the Blue Bell, in Bedlington. He was still there in 1831 and 1845, when those premises were used for auctions. However the 1851 census lists him as a musician and retired innkeeper; he in fact retired from the Blue Bell in June 1848, when John Grey, formerly landlord of the Red Lion Inn nearby, published an announcement that he had taken over the business.

A public house called The Blue Bell still stands on the same site, though the original building was demolished and rebuilt in 1903. Substantial old oak beams, apparently mediaeval, as well as an iron-studded oak door, were recovered from the old building at the time of its demolition. In 1845 the inn was one of two which were still used for the local Petty Sessions (magistrates' courts), as well as for auctions; the building was thus of some importance in the community. The Blue Bell was considered 'one of the oldest inns in the North'.

In 1829 and 1830, Thomas Hair, and the vicar, Henry Cotes, were members of the Bedlington Association for the Prosecution of Felons. He was thus considered as a respectable member of the community. As the Petty Sessions were held on his premises, it is hard to imagine how it could be otherwise. By 1860, with the growth of the town, a separate Court House was in use, and is shown on the Ordnance Survey map.

In 1838 Thomas was listed among the investors in a local bank, The Newcastle, Shields and Sunderland Union Joint Stock Banking Company, so he at least possessed enough money at this time to invest. He continued to be so listed, still giving his occupation as innkeeper, as late as 1849.

On his death, he made bequests of more than £350, but the total estate was valued at 'less than £600'. This, while not a huge amount, is very far from a state of poverty. A pitman might earn up to £1 in a week at this time.
