= William Vickers manuscript =

From 1770 to 1772 William Vickers compiled a manuscript collection of dance tunes, of which some 580 survive, including both pipe and fiddle tunes. The manuscript is incomplete and 31 pages have not survived, though their contents are listed at the beginning of the book. In the mid-19th century, the manuscript belonged to the pipemaker John Baty, of Wark, Northumberland; it now belongs to the Society of Antiquaries of Newcastle upon Tyne and is kept in the Northumberland County Record Office at Woodhorn, Ashington.

== William Vickers ==
Little is known of Vickers, although the manuscript indicates that he was obviously a keen musician who may have played the fiddle as many tunes are only playable on the instrument. The collection does not only contain fiddle tunes however, for instance there are numerous tunes with the characteristic 9-note range and mode of the Border pipes. Several of the tune titles refer to Northumberland and County Durham and a lot of other tunes are local to the region, so it is reasonable to conclude he lived in or around Newcastle upon Tyne. He may have been the William Vickers who was married at St Nicholas, Newcastle, in 1775, probably the same as the Excise Officer of the same name whose son, also William, was baptised there the following year. He certainly had some education, and a sense of humour - the tunes are introduced by a poem:

Musicks a Crotchet the Sober thinks it Vain
The Fiddles a Wooding Projection
Tunes are but Flights of a Whimsical Brain
Which the Bottle brings best to Parfection
Musisians are half witted mery and madd
And Those are the same that admire Them
Theyr fools if they Pley unless their Well Paid
And the Others are Blockheads to Hire them.

== The tunes ==
Although many tunes are local to the North East of England, many others are from Scotland, Southern England, Ireland and even France and Germany, revealing the extensive and varied repertoire of local musicians at that time. Many of the tunes go back a century and more to sources such as John Playford's The Dancing Master, while others were contemporary, for instance "Tristram Shandy" is named after the novel whose first volumes were published a decade before. There is a wide spread of tune types - FARNE lists 53 9/8 jigs, 192 6/8 jigs, 251 reels, 20 triple-time hornpipes, 32 common-time hornpipes, and 17 cotillons.

The collection includes many tunes not known elsewhere, while many tunes still current today make their first known appearance in it, including 'The College Hornpipe', 'The Irish Washerwoman' and 'Soldier's Joy'. One of the 31 missing pages included the first known reference to 'The Morpeth Rant', a characteristic local dance tune.

== Published and online editions ==
A facsimile of all the tune pages of the manuscript is visible on FARNE, with some annotations by Matt Seattle. The recent 2nd edition of the published book contains much more detailed notes, making clear the relation of tunes to any contemporary published or manuscript versions known, and listing many alternative titles for the tunes. There had been a local revival of interest in this music since the 1960s, led by the High Level Ranters. After the first publication of an edition of the tunebook in 1987, this interest became much more widespread. Many of the tunes are once again current in Northumberland and elsewhere, and are frequently performed and recorded.

== Partial discography ==
- A Mile to Ride (Trailer LER 2037), The High Level Ranters, 1973.
- The Bonny Pit Laddie (Topic 2-12TS271/2), The High Level Ranters, 1975.
- Ranting Lads (Topic 12TS388), The High Level Ranters, 1976.
- Cut and Dry Dolly (Topic 12TS278), Cut and Dry Band, 1976.
- Corby Crag, Alistair Anderson, (Topic TSDL371), 1977.
- Four in a Bar, The High Level Ranters, (Topic 12TS445), 1979.
- Northumbrian Choice, Minstrel's Fancy, Bonny at Morn, Pauline Cato, book and 2 CDs, DMPCD9701, DMPCD9702, 1997.
- Out of the Flames, Matt Seattle, DGM 9907, 1999.
- Tod's Assembly, Stewart Hardy, SHYCD1, 2001.
- Ashburnham, Dave Shepherd and Becky Price (Beautiful Jo Records BEJOCD – 36). 2001
- English and Border Music for Pipes, David Faulkner and Steve Turner, EELCD03, 2004.
- New Tyne Bridge, Pauline Cato, (Tomcat TCCD05), 2005.
- Time Out Of Mind, Chris Ormston, (Kyloe103), 2005.
- English Fiddle Tunes: For Violin, Pete Cooper, book and CD, (Schott ED 12758), 2006.
