= Tom Clough =

English player of the Northumbrian pipes

Tom Clough (1881–1964), known as "The Prince of Pipers", was an English player of the Northumbrian pipes, or Northumbrian smallpipes. He was also a pipemaker, and the pipes he made with Fred Picknell include several important innovations, and have a distinctive tone. He had studied the instrument with the noted piper Thomas Todd, and from his own father Henry Clough. His three surviving recordings, among the earliest recordings made of the instrument, and his considerable body of music manuscripts, including his own compositions, give considerable insight into the traditional playing technique and style of the instrument. This is particularly so because at least four previous generations of the family had been pipers, as was his son 'Young Tom' (1912–1987) – they thus form a continuous link between earliest players of the modern instrument, and contemporary players. In contrast to the widely accepted notion of traditional folk music as an essentially rural activity, he and his family lived in the mining community of Newsham in south-east Northumberland, and were miners themselves. At the end of his life, "Young Tom" recalled piping sessions at the 'Willow Tree' in Newsham, with his father Tom, grandfather Henry Clough, and Richard Mowat all playing – Henry's and Richard Mowat's playing would get more furious and inaccurate as the evening progressed; Tom was teetotal. Young Tom had the job of carrying his grandfather's pipes afterwards. There is a composite photograph of the Clough family at. Here Tom himself is on the left, his pipemaking collaborator Fred Picknell standing behind him, his father Henry Clough and son 'Young Tom' standing towards the right, while an older image of Tom's grandfather "Old Tom", seated piping in the foreground, has been added subsequently. Old Tom died in 1885, and the main photograph was taken in 1924. The other figure, seated on the far right, is believed to be Captain Nicholson of Haydon Bridge, a traditional fiddler.

== The Family ==
The family can be traced back to before 1800 – tracing them is made somewhat easier as they maintained a naming pattern where the names Thomas and Henry recur in successive generations. To distinguish people with the same name, they are numbered consecutively.

The earliest known piping member of the family was Tom (I) (c. 1760-18??). According to his descendant Tom (III), Tom (I) was present, perhaps as a participant, at a competition in Elsdon in 1800 when young William Lamshaw beat James Allan. Miners often moved at this time in search of work, and tracing the family this early has been difficult. Some of the moves seem to correspond to the sinking of new pit shafts, and the family may at this time have specialised in this skill, perhaps accounting for their relative wealth.

A remark of Tom (III) suggests Tom (I)'s son James was also a piper, though there is little direct evidence of this.

James had a son Henry (I) (1789–1842). It is known that Henry (I) played Northumbrian pipes, as well as a set of Pastoral pipes, whose drones survive to this day. Henry is the named composer of some of the variation sets which survive in the manuscripts compiled by Tom (III). He is said to have known the piper Young William Lamshaw; this was perhaps as a pupil, for Lamshaw died in 1806, when Henry was only 17.

One of Henry (I)'s younger sons Tom (II) (1828–1885), known as 'Old Tom' is the first of the family whom we know much about. He was resident in Newsham, and hired as a sinker when the Cowpen "C", or "Isabella" pit was sunk in 1849, and gave his occupation as pitman when he married in 1850. He was also, nearer the end of his life, after the pit where he worked was laid idle, the landlord of The Willow Tree, then the only public house in Newsham. A hornpipe, The Willow Tree, by Tom (II), is still widely played among pipers. Tom (II) learned the pipes, not from his father, but from George Nicholson, of Blyth, and from Thomas Hair. In later life he won several competitions, in particular those organised by the Society of Antiquaries in Newcastle Town Hall in 1877, 1878 and 1879 – the first prize in these was the substantial sum of 10 guineas. After his third victory, he won, outright, a fine silver cup which is now in the Morpeth Chantry Museum. He was debarred from competing subsequently, but continued to attend and play. He died in June 1885, and had a substantial obituary, of one and a half columns, in the following week's Morpeth Herald. This confirms that he was a sinker of pit shafts, as others of the family are believed to have been, and lists his piping achievements, as well stating that he won trophies and cash prizes (£50 on one occasion) for shooting. The family must have been affluent at this time, as his grave is marked with a fine Cheviot granite tombstone, which still stands.

Tom (II) had a son, Henry (II) (1855–1936). He is the first member of the family known to have written tunes down, and a tune book of his survives. On several occasions, including once in 1905, Henry and his son, Tom (III), were invited to play at Alnwick Castle on the occasion of a royal visit. Henry (II) and his younger brother James (1861–?) were both pipers, and competed, at first in the beginners' class, from 1879 onwards. Henry's brother James seems not to have played the pipes in public later in life. He may be the James Clough who became manager of the Barrington Colliery at Bedlington, and if so, the pressure of that job may have meant he had less time for piping. Henry was a contemporary of Richard Mowat, and during the 1880s and 1890s often came second to him in competition. In 1899, Henry won a competition run by the Northumberland Smallpipes Society, with a prize of a gold medal. That society dissolved shortly after this event, however. After the Northumbrian Pipers' Society was founded in 1928, Henry was elected as one of the Vice-Presidents.

Henry's son Tom (III) (1881–1964), the main subject of this article, is notable for several reasons. He studied with Thomas Todd, having first learned the basics of the instrument practicing in the house of a neighbour, in secret from his father, on borrowed pipes. He first entered a competition in 1894, winning the learners' class, and placing third in the Open the following year, behind Richard Mowat and his father. He was married in 1905, to Ann (Nancy) Dobinson. There is a story that he proposed when he realised the bead and cane curtain in her parents' house provided ideal raw material for reed making. One old drone reed in the set of pipes formerly belonging to his son 'Young Tom' Clough (IV) does indeed have a residue of black paint. He became friendly with figures who were active in the folk music revival, notably Cecil Sharp, William Cocks in Northumberland, the composer and musicologist William G. Whittaker and the graphic artist Stanley Kennedy North, an active member of the Musical Association, and himself a piper. Kennedy North's influence was probably crucial in arranging Tom's recordings, his performances at concerts in London, his broadcasts for the BBC, and a folk music tour of Germany and the Netherlands. Kennedy North also made very precise fair copies of some variation sets from Tom's repertoire, apparently in preparation for publication. These, together with Tom's own extensive manuscripts, give a detailed picture of his repertoire, while his three recordings give a good insight into his style. Tom became deaf from the late 1940s onwards, partly as a result of a bomb which destroyed his house in 1940, but perhaps also due to hearing damage from working with explosives in the mine; though he had worked initially below ground, he subsequently worked on the surface in the explosive store. He was less and less able to play from about 1950 until his death. It is known from Eddie Jackson that Clough also played the fiddle in the 1940s – Eddie was a neighbour at this time. There is no early evidence of him as a fiddler, so this may have been in part a response to his hearing loss.

Tom (III)'s son, "Young Tom" (IV) (1912–1987) learned to play at first from his grandfather Henry, then his father. He played only rarely in later life, but towards the end of his life met Chris Ormston on several occasions. His playing style was similar to that of his father, and he was able to explain details of this, and to confirm some conclusions Chris Ormston had reached from study of Tom (III)'s recordings. He commented of Ormston's playing, "me fyether would've liked you".

== The recording, and playing style ==
In 1929, HMV issued a recording of Tom (III) playing three pieces – Elsey Marley, The Keel Row and Holey Ha'penny. The first is a simple song tune in jig time, the latter two are elaborate variation sets. This recording is currently available on The Northumbrian Smallpipes (Topic TSCD487); The Keel Row may be listened to online on Soundcloud Tom Clough 1929, while "Elsie Marley" and "Holey Ha'penny" are at Tom Clough 1929 – re-mastered Ho'ley Ha'penny-Elsie Marley. The pieces, especially the variation sets, are played in a highly ornate style, and what is significant about the technique, apart from his great skill, is the total lack of open-fingered or slurred notes. The chanter is closed, and hence silent briefly, between any pair of notes. This forms a great contrast with the style of Billy Pigg, which was distinguished by his use of open-fingered ornamentation. Tom felt, on the other hand, that open fingering was "a grievous error in smallpipe playing". This "error" persists: Young Tom once commented "Nowadays they play with half their hand off the chanter." Chris Ormston, who knew "Young Tom" for a few months before his death, is a respected modern piper who consistently uses and advocates the "Clough" style. One other recording is known to have been made by Tom (III), late in his life, when his deafness was severe. This was made by Colin Ross and Forster Charlton, of Tom playing his variations on Nae Guid luck; while this recording was used to transcribe the piece for the Pipers' Society Tunebook, it was apparently not kept, as it was felt that it would not be fair on Tom to retain it.

In 1929, as well as making the recording for HMV, he also travelled to The Hague and Cologne with a group of singers; the trip was organised by the International Society for Contemporary Music, the Nederland-England Society and the Folk-song Society. The group also made a radio broadcast from Cologne.

== His teaching ==
Tom Clough was an influential teacher of the pipes, though at an advanced level: his pupil Tommy Breckons recalled learning first from G.G. Armstrong, and then from Tom Clough: "Now as to the difference between Tom and George. Tom wouldn't have been much use to a novice piper.... But George had a gift for teaching a novice. He could show you how to do things. I don't quite know how he did it!." He described Tom Clough's set of exercises, which he said were similar to G.G. Armstrong's – Armstrong had learned from the Clough family. These exercises consisted of scales and arpeggios – the pupil would have to start slowly, and increase speed till mistakes happened. Another group of exercises, based on variation sets, are all found in the four tunes Fenwick of Bywell, Jacky Layton, Felton Lonnen and Oh dear, what can the matter be. He also gave a description of Tom Clough's meticulous teaching technique: "He made you break a tune down and play it bar by bar. If there was a bar bothering you, you played that bar until you got it right. Then you put the bars together, then put the measure together, and then eventually the tune together. Finally you could start at the beginning and go through it."

Tommy Breckons also recalled his friend Billy Pigg's recollection of playing at a regular session at Tom Clough's: When he lived at Blagdon, he used to bike down to Clough's. There were fourteen or fifteen pipers all living in that area, and they took turns to play at each other's houses, including Billy's. Billy told me that when he first went to one of these sessions there were fourteen pipers in the house, "...and everyone was better than me! By God..., there were some good pipers. But all I had to dee was practice and get up alongside them."

== The manuscripts ==
A book on the family and their music, was published by the Northumbrian Pipers' Society in 2000. This has become a significant source for players of the instrument. It contains a short biography, selections from Tom Clough's writings, a description of his playing style, transcriptions of the three recordings, and selections from his music manuscripts. These include his extensive collection of variation sets. Of these, some are distinctive versions of traditional variation sets, such as I saw my love come passing by me, other sets are his own compositions such as the variations on The tailors are aal gyen styen blind. Others are his adaptations, to Northumbrian pipes, of sets composed for other instruments such as the fiddle. Some of the versions are very old – for instance, the triple-time hornpipe Lads of Alnwick, here with 5 strains, is almost identical to William Dixon's version from the 1730s, while the commonly played 19th century version omits the final strain.

Comparison of the recordings of The Keel Row and Holey Ha'penny with his manuscripts of the same pieces, and his notes on how to play them, suggests that most of the pieces in his huge repertoire were played much more floridly than he notated them.

Unfortunately, by the time portable tape recording became available in the 1950s, he had largely given up playing owing to severe deafness. However, the three surviving HMV recordings are a testament both to his virtuosity and to the expressive power of the traditional close-fingered style.

== Pipemaking ==
From about 1911 until 1943, Clough was, both alone and in collaboration with others, particularly Fred Picknell, a prolific maker of Northumbrian pipes. The earliest dateable reference to anybody buying a Clough chanter is from 1911, while Clough generally played a chanter by Picknell, which he used playing for King Edward in 1906. Picknell died in 1943, and Clough's house was bombed in the same year and his lathe stolen – as pieces of pipes he was working on were also stolen, he must still have been an active pipemaker until this time. Clough also made reeds – there is a tradition that he made drone reeds from pieces of a bead curtain from the home of his wife Nancy's parents. This is corroborated by many of his surviving drone reeds having been previously painted black, including some in a set belonging to 'Young Tom', now in the possession of Chris Ormston.

While those pipes Clough made on his own have been described as rough in their workmanship, those he made in collaboration with Picknell, a colliery blacksmith, are relatively fine and delicate. In 1933, William Cocks wrote that F. Picknell's pipes and chanters are unmarked, and of very good clean workmanship. As there is no evidence Picknell played the pipes himself, it would make sense for him to collaborate with Clough, considered the best piper of his age.

The piper and pipemaker Andy May, who has studied many of their surviving complete sets and chanters, has written, that they were the most prolific makers of extended-range chanters between James Reid who died in 1874, and Bill Hedworth who began making them in the 1950s. In particular, they extended the range further, down to low A, and in at least one case low G. The latter chanter has the keys for low G, B and A mounted from left to right in a single block, and May believes this is the first chanter made with a range down to low G, and the first use of such a triple key block. Young Tom Clough believed much of the work developing such chanters was done during the General Strike of 1926. Other innovations in the extended Clough/Picknell chanters are that the pairing of keys is different from that of the Reids' chanters, and that the lower holes are sited significantly lower down the chanter than on comparable Reid instruments, improving the intonation for these notes, and making the instrument easier to reed. There is a newspaper photograph of Tom playing on pipes with an extended chanter at.
