= Northumbrian Pipers' Society =

Bagpipe society in Northumberland, England

The Northumbrian Pipers' Society was founded to promote both types of Northumbrian bagpipes – the Northumbrian smallpipes and the half-long pipes, now generally known as the Border pipes. There had been several attempts to encourage the pipes and their music during the 19th century, but no society was formed with this specific aim until the Northumbrian Small Pipes Society in 1893. That society organised a series of competitions, in which Richard Mowat and Henry Clough were both prizewinners. However it was short-lived, dissolving around 1899. Today the society is divided into two branches, the main branch based in Morpeth, and the Cleveland branch based in Sedgefield.

The Northumbrian Pipers' Society was founded in 1928 in Newcastle upon Tyne, under the patronage of the Duke of Northumberland. The first President was G. V. B. Charlton, who had been active in encouraging the playing of the smallpipes, and particularly the revival of the half-long pipes. Its policy aim was to encourage and stimulate 'the younger generation of pipers and beginners in pipe playing'. Billy Pigg, an influential piper, was a vice-president from 1930, while Tom Clough, known as the 'Prince of Pipers', accepted a vice-presidency in 1933. At first they met in each other's homes to exchange tunes and to organise the occasional dance. In 1937 they acquired a permanent home in the Morden Tower in Newcastle. The Society's regular meetings and annual competitions are currently held the Chantry Bagpipe Museum, in Morpeth. It also holds an annual concert in Morpeth. It publishes a quarterly newsletter and an annual magazine, as well as many important collections of pipe music, including, in 2000 The Clough Family of Newsham, a detailed study of the music of Tom Clough and his family, and, in 1997, The Border Minstrel, which included all of Billy Pigg's known compositions, and some other tunes from his repertoire. Other important recent tunebooks include a new edition of John Peacock's early tunebook, and a book of James Hill's hornpipes and other tunes, adapted for the smallpipes, and a tunebook and tutor for the Border pipes. They also published an important book on pipemaking, by William Alfred Cocks and Jim F. Bryan, The Northumbrian Bagpipes, in 1967.

The relative popularity of the instrument today, compared to the small numbers of players in the early 20th century, the wider availability of well-made instruments, and the availability in print of much of the instrument's traditional repertoire, can all be ascribed, directly or indirectly, to the work of the Society.

The Society converted to charitable status on 1 April 2012.

== Presidents ==
- 2006–2009 – Jim F. Bryan
