= Thomas Bewick =

English engraver and natural history author (1753–1828)

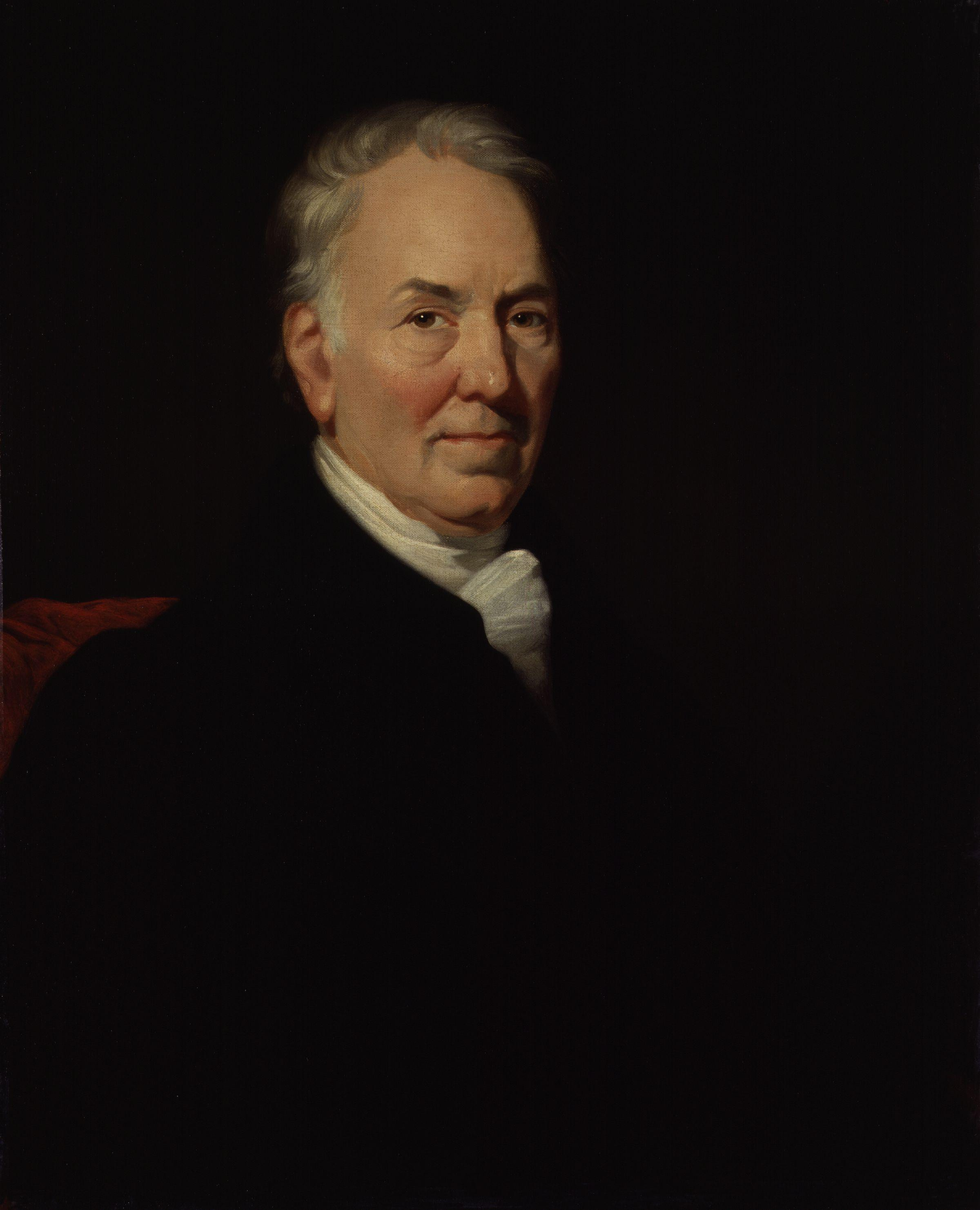
- Portrait by James Ramsay
- Born: c. 11 August 1753; Mickley, Northumberland, England
- Died: 8 November 1828 (aged 75); Gateshead, Durham, England
- Occupations: Wood engraver; natural history author
- Spouse: Isabella Elliott (m. 1786; died 1826)
- Children: 4, including Robert, Jane and Isabella and Elisabeth

Thomas Bewick (c. 11 August 1753 – 8 November 1828) was an English wood-engraver and natural history author. Early in his career he took on all kinds of work such as engraving cutlery, making the wood blocks for advertisements, and illustrating children's books. He gradually turned to illustrating, writing and publishing his own books, gaining an adult audience for the fine illustrations in A History of Quadrupeds.

His career began when he was apprenticed to engraver Ralph Beilby in Newcastle upon Tyne. He became a partner in the business and eventually took it over. Apprentices whom Bewick trained include John Anderson, Luke Clennell, and William Harvey, who in their turn became well known as painters and engravers.

Bewick is best known for his A History of British Birds, which is admired today mainly for its wood engravings, especially the small, sharply observed, and often humorous vignettes known as tail-pieces. The book was the forerunner of all modern field guides. He notably illustrated editions of Aesop's Fables throughout his life.

He is "usually considered the founder of wood-engraving" as "the first to realize its full potentialities", using metal-engraving tools to cut hard boxwood across the grain, producing printing blocks that could be integrated with metal type, but were much more detailed and durable than traditional woodcuts. The result was high-quality illustration at a low price.

== Life ==
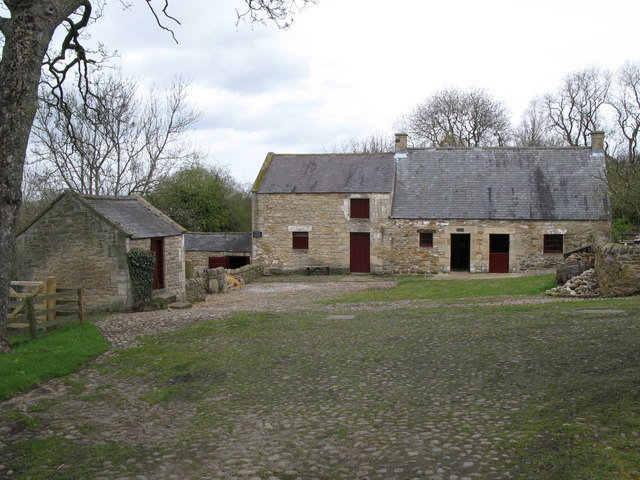
Cherryburn, Bewick's childhood home

Bewick [pronounced /ˈbjuːɪk/; BYOO-ik] was born at Cherryburn, a house in the village of Mickley, Northumberland, near Newcastle upon Tyne on 10 or 11 August 1753, although his birthday was always celebrated on the 12th. (Note: This was less than a year after the calendar was reformed, a time when there was some confusion about dates.) His parents were tenant farmers: his father John had been married before his union with Jane, and was in his forties when Thomas, the eldest of eight, was born. John rented a small colliery at Mickley Bank, which employed perhaps six men. Bewick attended school in the nearby village of Ovingham.

Bewick did not flourish at schoolwork, but at a very early age showed a talent for drawing. He had no lessons in art. At the age of 14 he was apprenticed to Ralph Beilby, an engraver in Newcastle, where he learnt how to engrave on wood and metal, for example marking jewellery and cutlery with family names and coats of arms. In Beilby's workshop Bewick engraved a series of diagrams on wood for Charles Hutton, illustrating a treatise on measurement. He seems thereafter to have devoted himself entirely to engraving on wood, and in 1775 he received a prize from the Royal Society for the Encouragement of Arts, Manufactures and Commerce for a wood engraving of the "Huntsman and the Old Hound" from Select Fables by the late Mr Gay, which he was illustrating.

In 1776 Bewick became a partner in Beilby's workshop. The joint business prospered, becoming Newcastle's leading engraving service with an enviable reputation for high-quality work and good service. In September 1776 he went to London for eight months, finding the city rude, deceitful and cruel, and much disliking the unfairness of extreme wealth and poverty side by side. He returned to his beloved Newcastle as soon as he could, but his time in the capital gave him a wider reputation, business experience, and an awareness of new movements in art.

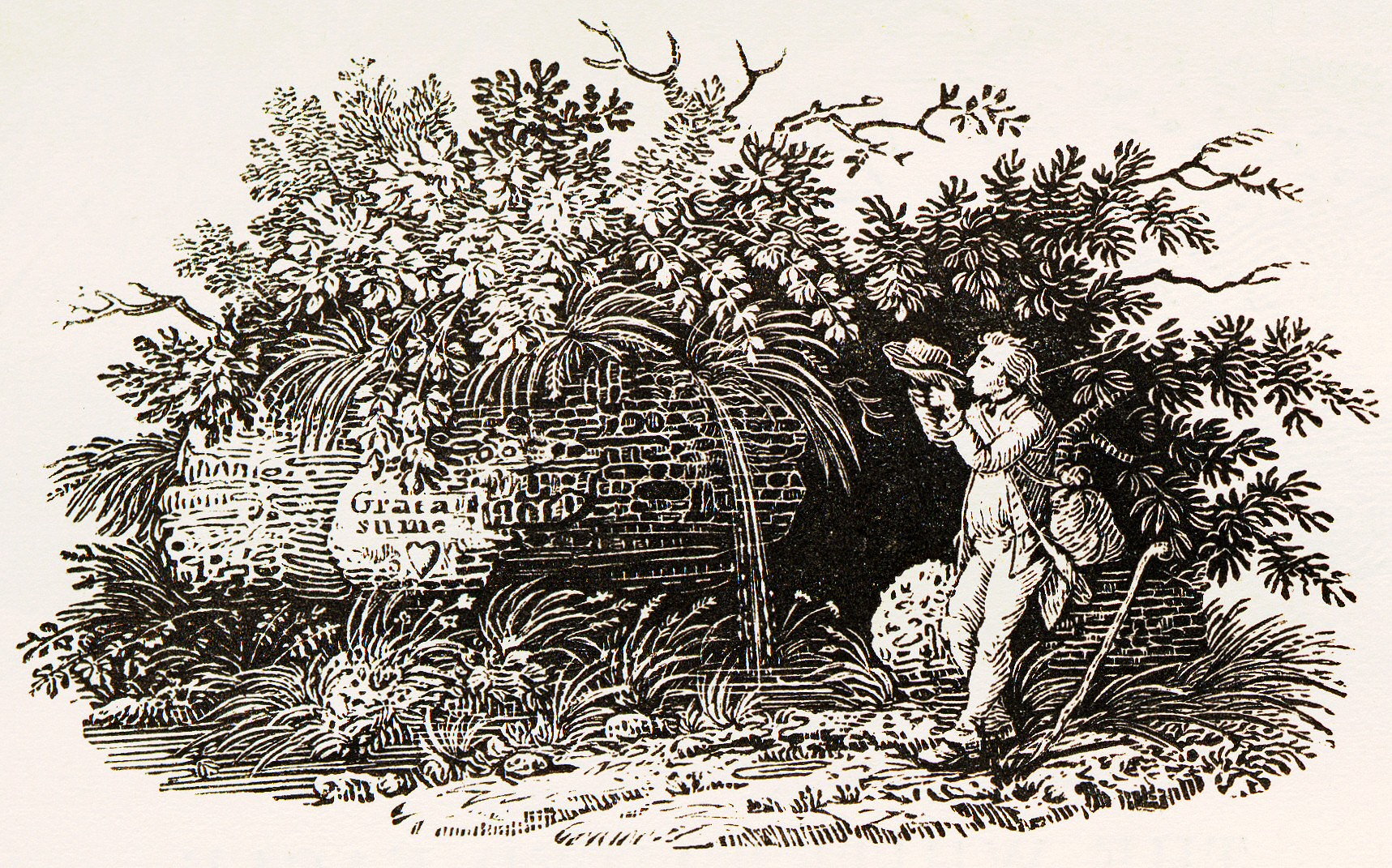
Tail-piece in A History of British Birds, said to be of Bewick himself as a thirsty traveller drinking from his hat

In 1786, when he was financially secure, he married Isabella Elliott from Ovingham; she had been a friend when they were children. They had four children, Robert, Jane, Isabella, and Elizabeth; the daughters worked on their father's memoir after his death. At that period in his life he was described by the Newcastle artist Thomas Sword Good as "a man of athletic make, nearly 6 feet high and proportionally stout. He possessed great personal courage and in his younger years was not slow to repay an insult with personal chastisement. On one occasion, being assaulted by two pitmen on returning from a visit to Cherryburn, he resolutely turned upon the aggressors, and as he said, 'paid them both well'."

Bewick was also noted as having a strong moral sense and was an early campaigner for fair treatment of animals. He objected to the docking of horses' tails, the mistreatment of performing animals such as bears, and cruelty to dogs. Above all, he thought war utterly pointless. All these themes recur in his engravings, which echo Hogarth's attention to moral themes. For example, he shows wounded soldiers with wooden legs, back from the wars, and animals with a gallows in the background.

Bewick had at least 30 pupils who worked for him and Beilby as apprentices, the first of which was his younger brother John. Several gained distinction as engravers, including John Anderson, Luke Clennell, Charlton Nesbit, William Harvey, Robert Johnson, and his son and later partner Robert Elliot Bewick.

The partners published their History of Quadrupeds in 1790, intended for children but reaching an adult readership, and its success encouraged them to consider a more serious work of natural history. In preparation for this Bewick spent several years engraving the wood blocks for Land Birds, the first volume of A History of British Birds. Given his detailed knowledge of the birds of Northumberland, Bewick prepared the illustrations, so Beilby was given the task of assembling the text, which he struggled to do. Bewick ended up writing most of the text, which led to a dispute over authorship; Bewick refused to have Beilby named as the author, and in the end only Bewick's name appeared on the title-page, along with a paragraph of explanation at the end of the preface.

It may be proper to observe, that while one of the editors of this work was engaged in preparing the Engravings, the compilation of the descriptions was undertaken by the other, subject, however, to the corrections of his friend, whose habits led him to a more intimate acquaintance with this branch of Natural History. – Land Birds, Preface.

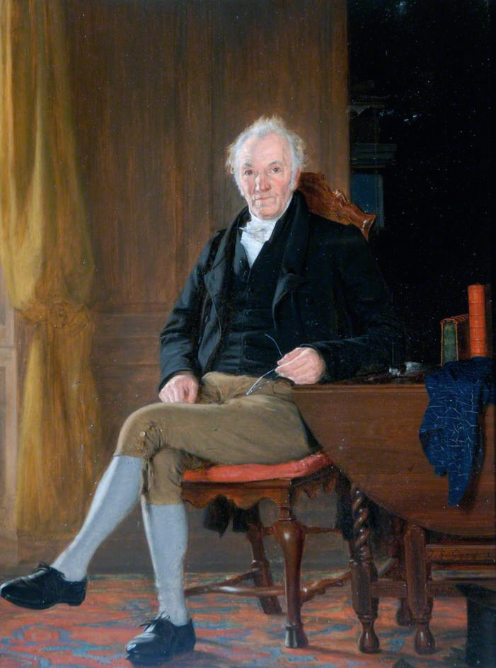
Thomas Bewick in 1827, by Thomas Sword Good

The book was an immediate success when published—by Beilby and Bewick themselves—in 1797. Before its publication, Bewick illustrated Arnaud Berquin's Looking-Glass for the Mind in 1792 and J. H. Wynne's Tales for Youth in 1794 for the printer Elizabeth Newbery and in 1795 an anthological character study of the Kings and Queens of England. Given the success of the 1797 publication of his bird illustrations, Bewick started work at once on the second volume, Water Birds, but the disagreement over authorship led to a final split with Beilby. Bewick was unable to control his feelings and resolve issues quietly, so the partnership ended, turbulently and expensively, leaving Bewick with his own workshop. Bewick had to pay £20, equivalent to about £20,000 in 2011, (Note: Comparing average earnings of £20 in 1797 with 2011.) in lawyer's fees, and more than £21 for Beilby's share of the workshop equipment.

With the assistance of his apprentices Bewick brought out the second volume, Water Birds, in 1804, as the sole author. He found the task of managing the printers continually troublesome, but the book met with as much success as the first volume.

In April 1827, the American naturalist and bird painter John James Audubon came to Britain to find a suitable printer for his enormous Birds of America. Bewick, still lively at age 74, showed him the woodcut he was working on, a dog afraid of tree stumps that seem in the dark to be devilish figures, and gave Audubon a copy of his Quadrupeds for his children.

Bewick was fond of the music of Northumberland, and of the Northumbrian smallpipes in particular. He especially wanted to promote the Northumbrian smallpipes, and to support the piper John Peacock, so he encouraged Peacock to teach pupils to become masters of this kind of music. One of these pupils was Thomas's son, Robert, whose surviving manuscript tunebooks give a picture of a piper's repertoire in the 1820s.

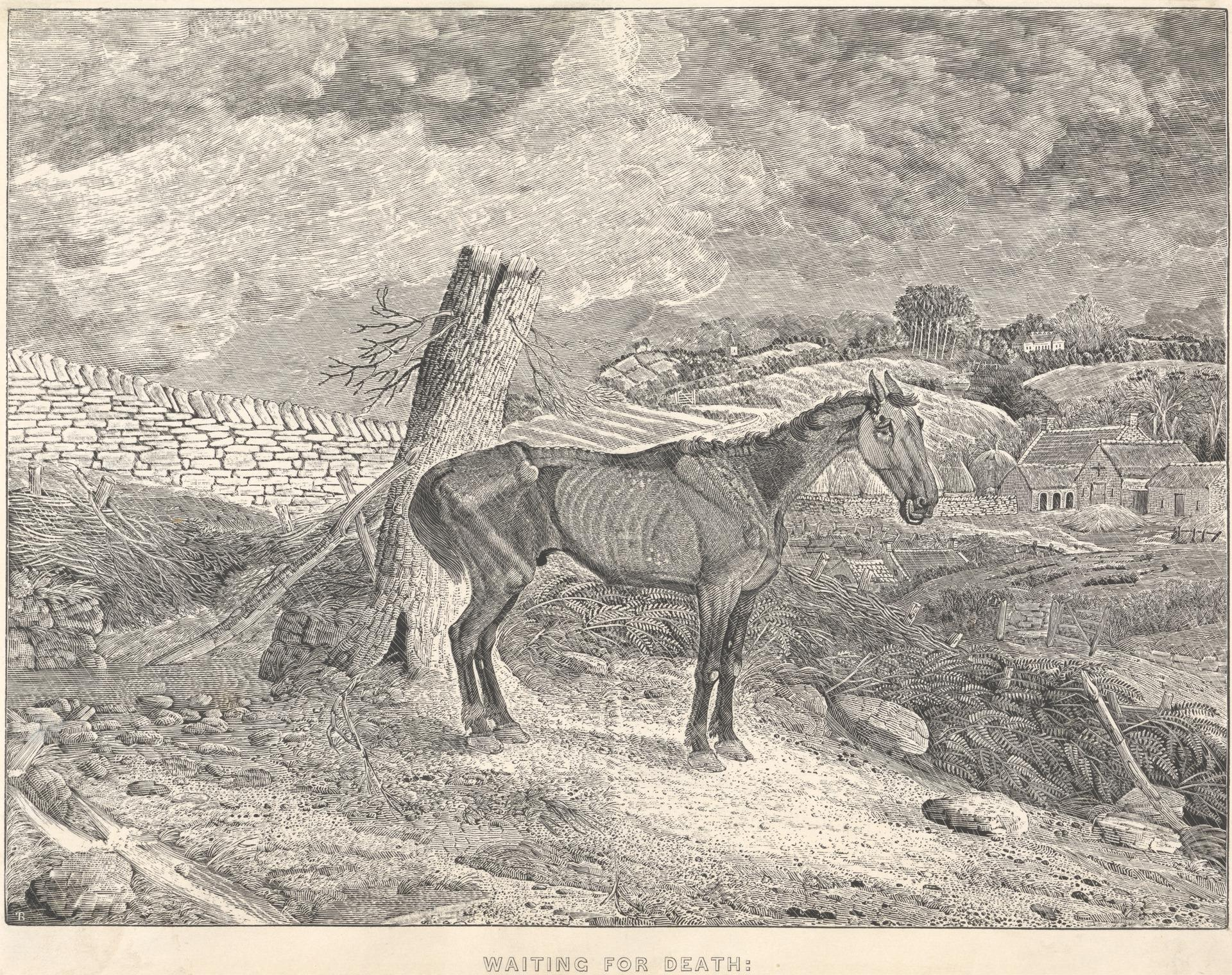
Waiting for Death, Bewick's last wood engraving from 1828, published 1832

Bewick's last wood engraving, Waiting for Death, was of an old bony workhorse, standing forlorn by a tree stump, which he had seen and sketched as an apprentice; the work echoes William Hogarth's last work, The Bathos, which shows the fallen artist by a broken column. He died after a few days' illness on 8 November 1828, at his home. He was buried in Ovingham churchyard, beside his wife Isabella, who had died two years earlier, (Note: Isabella Bewick died on 1 February 1826.) and not far from his parents and his brother John.

== Work ==
=== Technique ===
Bewick's art is considered the pinnacle of his medium, now called wood engraving. This is due both to his skill and to the method, which unlike the woodcut technique of his predecessors, carves against the grain, in hard box wood, using fine tools normally favoured by metal engravers.

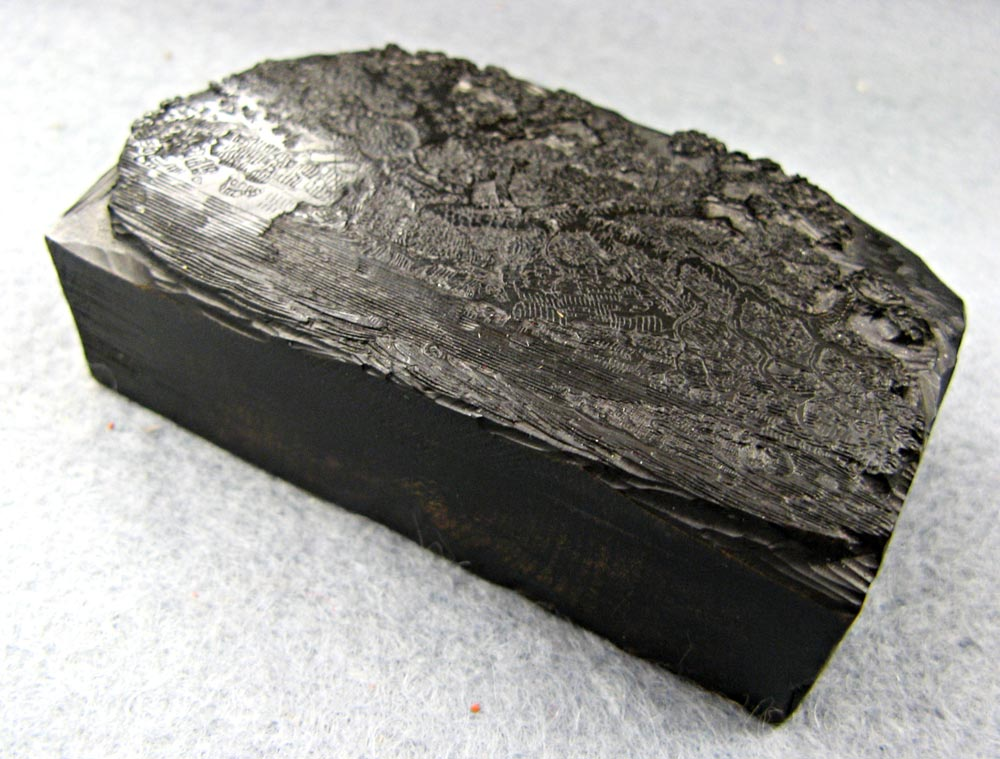
One of Bewick's wood blocks

Boxwood cut across the end-grain is hard enough for fine engraving, allowing greater detail than in normal woodcuts; this has largely replaced the basic woodcut since Bewick's time. In addition, since wood engraving is a relief printing technique, inked on the face, it requires only low pressure to print an image, so the blocks last for many thousands of prints, and importantly can be assembled into the same forme as the letterpress or metal type for the text, allowing both on the same page, and all the printing to be done in a single run. In contrast, copper plate engravings are an intaglio printing technique, inked in the engraved grooves, the face being wiped clean of ink before printing, so a special type of printing press applying much higher pressure is required, and images must be printed separately from the text, at far greater expense.

Bewick made use of his close observation of nature, his remarkable visual memory, and his sharp eyesight to create accurate and extremely small details in his wood engravings, which proved to be both a strength and a weakness. If properly printed and closely examined, his prints could be seen to convey subtle clues to the character of his natural subjects, with humour and feeling. This was achieved by carefully varying the depth of the engraved grooves to provide actual greys, not only black and white, as well as the pattern of the marks to provide texture. But this subtlety of engraving created a serious technical difficulty for his printers; they needed to ink his blocks with just the right amount of ink, mixed so as to be of exactly the right thickness, and to press the block to the paper slowly and carefully, to obtain a result that would satisfy Bewick. This made printing slow and expensive. It also created a problem for Bewick's readers; if they lacked his excellent eyesight, they needed a magnifying glass to study his prints, especially the miniature tail-pieces. But the effect was transformative, and wood engraving became the main method of illustrating books for a century. The quality of Bewick's engravings attracted a far wider readership to his books than he had expected: his Fables and Quadrupeds were at the outset intended for children.

Bewick ran his workshop collaboratively, developing the skills of his apprentices, so while he did not complete every task for every illustration himself, he was always closely involved, as John Rayner explains:

some blocks would be drawn by one brother and cut by the other, the rough work would be done by pupils, who would also, if they showed aptitude, draw and finish designs—on the same principle as the schools of Renaissance painters; and we cannot ... be sure in all cases that the engravings ... are the work of Thomas Bewick from first to last, but he had a hand to a great extent in nearly all, and certainly had the last word in all of them.

Over 100 of Bewick's wood-engraved blocks are held by the Newberry Library.

==== Major works ====
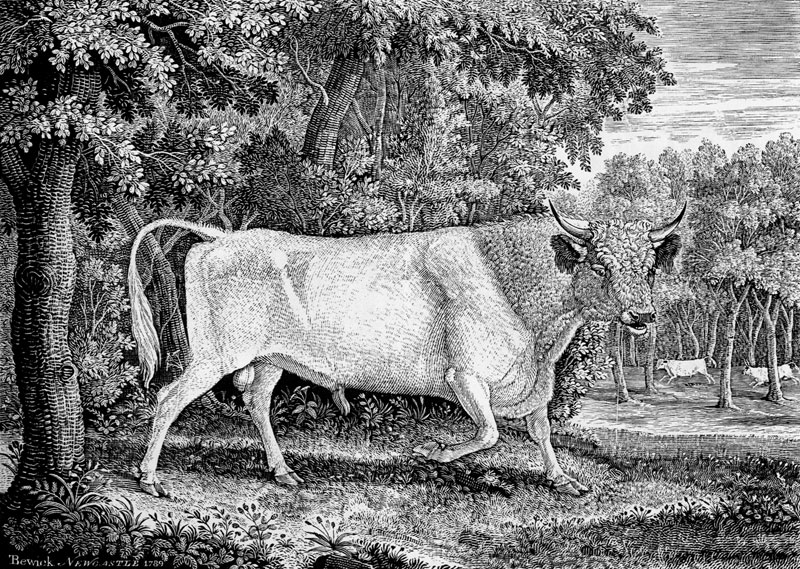
The very large (7 1/4 × 9 3/4 inches) wood engraving by Thomas Bewick of a Chillingham Bull, executed for Marmaduke Tunstall of Wycliffe, Yorkshire in 1789

Works using his wood engraving technique, for which he became well known, include the engravings for Oliver Goldsmith's Traveller and The Deserted Village, for Thomas Parnell's Hermit, and for William Somervile's Chase. But "the best known of all Bewick's prints" is said by The Bewick Society to be The Chillingham Bull, executed by Bewick on an exceptionally large woodblock for Marmaduke Tunstall, a gentleman who owned an estate at Wycliffe in the North Riding of Yorkshire.

==== Tail-pieces ====
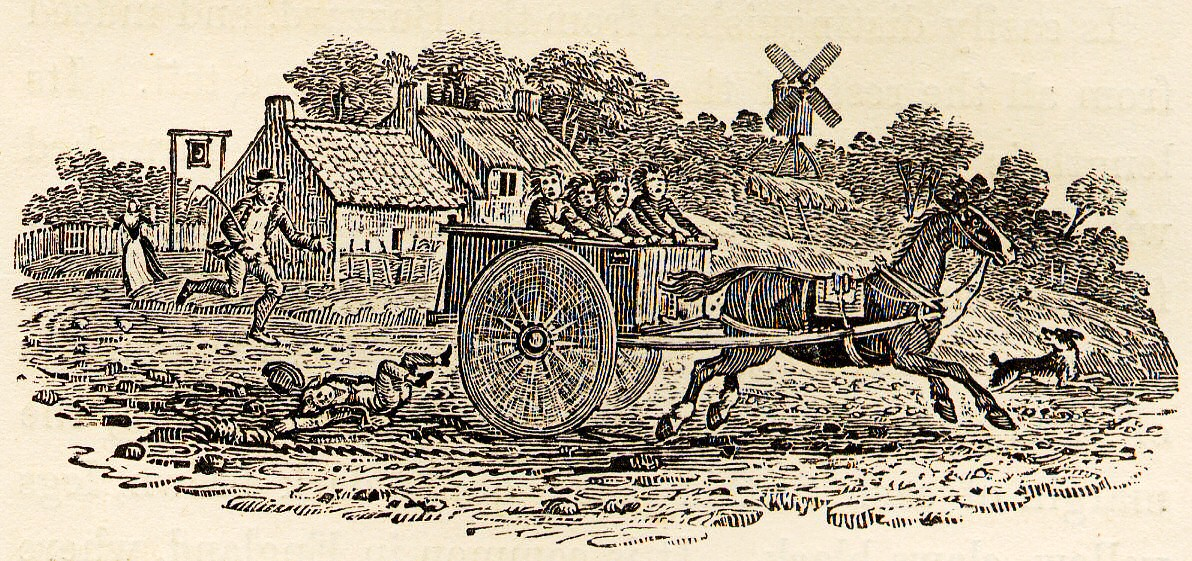
A minutely detailed tail-piece, only 8 cm (3 in) wide, in British Birds, 1797

The tail- or tale-pieces, a Bewick speciality, are small engravings chosen to fill gaps such as those at the ends of the species articles in British Birds, each bird's description beginning on a new page. The images are full of life and movement, often with a moral, sometimes with humour, always with sympathy and precise observation, so the images tell a tale as well as being at the tail ends of articles. For example, the runaway cart, at the end of "The Sparrow-Hawk", fills what would otherwise be a 5 cm (2 in) high gap. Hugh Dixon explains:

The runaway cart is a wonderful mixture of action and danger. The boys have been playing in the cart and the horse has bolted; perhaps the dog's barking was the cause. The drawing of the wheel—an extraordinary depiction for its time—shows that the cart has gathered speed. One boy has already fallen and probably hurt himself. The others hang on shouting with fear. And why has it all happened? The carter with his tankard in his hand runs too late from the inn. Has he been distracted by the shapely girl? And is it an accident that the inn sign looks a little like a gallows?

==== Bookplates ====
The workshop of Beilby, Bewick, and son produced many ephemeral materials such as letterhead stationery, shop advertisement cards, and other business materials. Of these ephemeral productions, "bookplates have survived the best". Bewick's bookplates were illustrations made from engravings, containing the name or initials of the book's owner.

=== Aesop's Fables ===
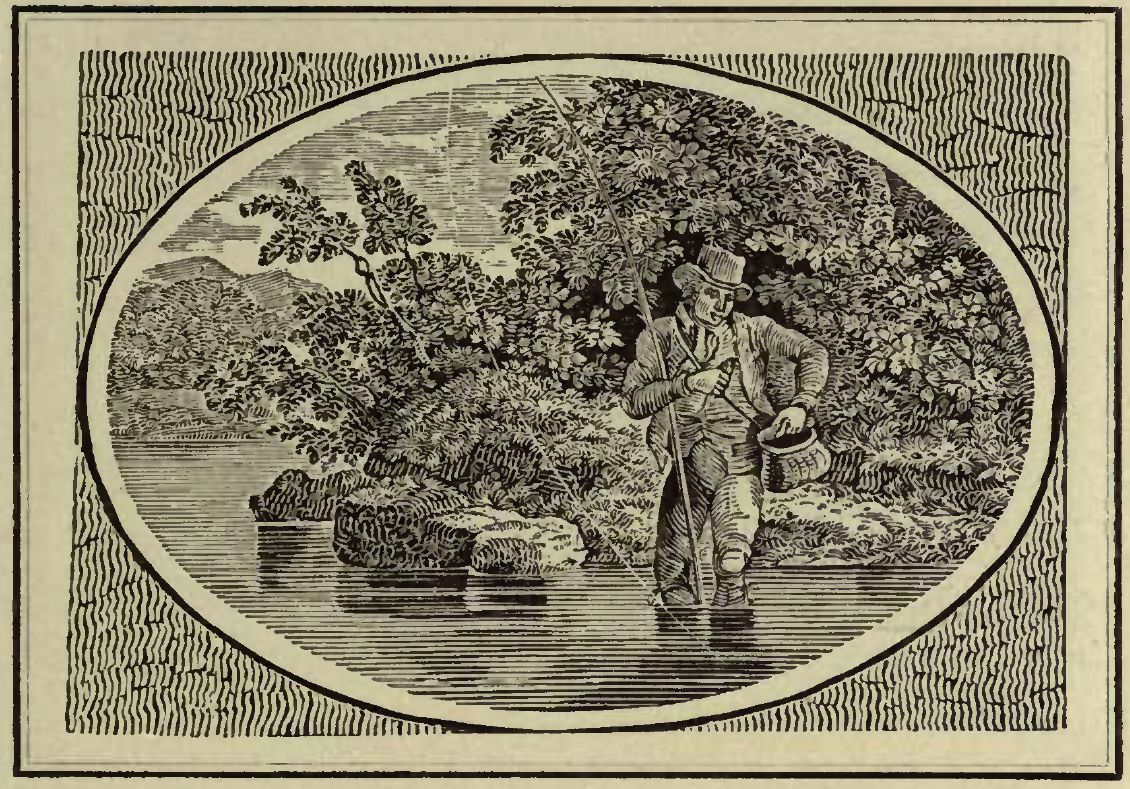
Bewick's illustration for the fable of The angler and the little fish

The various editions of Aesop's Fables illustrated by Bewick span almost his entire creative life. The first was created for the Newcastle bookseller Thomas Saint during his apprentice years, an edition of Robert Dodsley's Select Fables published in 1776. With his brother John he later contributed to a three-volume edition for the same publisher in 1784, reusing some pictures from the 1776 edition.

Bewick went on to produce a third edition of the fables. While convalescing from a dangerous illness in 1812, he turned his attention to a long-cherished venture, a large three-volume edition of The Fables of Aesop and Others, eventually published in 1818. The work is divided into three sections: the first has some of Dodsley's fables prefaced by a short prose moral; the second has "Fables with Reflections", in which each story is followed by a prose and a verse moral and then a lengthy prose reflection; the third, "Fables in Verse", includes fables from other sources in poems by several unnamed authors. Engravings were initially designed on the wood by Bewick and then cut by his apprentices under close supervision, refined where necessary by himself. This edition used a method that Bewick had pioneered, "white-line" engraving, a dark-to-light technique in which the lines to remain white are cut out of the woodblock.

=== A General History of Quadrupeds ===
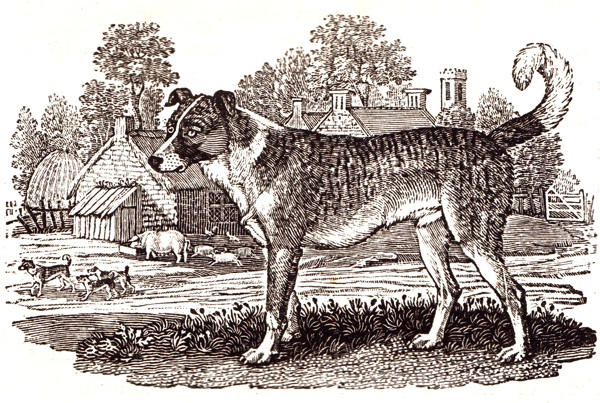
"The Ban-dog" from History of Quadrupeds, 1790

A General History of Quadrupeds appeared in 1790. It deals with 260 mammals from across the world, including animals from "Adive" to "Zorilla". It is particularly thorough on some of the domestic animals: the first entry describes the horse. Beilby and Bewick had difficulty deciding what to include, and especially on how to organise the entries. They had hoped to arrange the animals systematically, but they found that the rival systems of Linnaeus, Buffon and John Ray conflicted, and in Linnaeus's case at least changed with every edition of his work. They decided to put useful animals first "which so materially contribute to the strength, the wealth, and the happiness of this kingdom".

The book's coverage is erratic, a direct result of the sources that Bewick consulted: his own knowledge of British animals, the available scholarly sources, combined with George Culley's 1786 Observations on Livestock and the antique John Caius's 1576 On English Dogs. Bewick had to hand the Swedish naturalist Anders Sparrman's account of his visit to the Cape of Good Hope on Cook's expedition of 1772 to 1776, and animals from the Southern Cape figure largely in the book. It was an energetic muddle, but it was at once greeted with enthusiasm by the British public. They liked the combination of vigorous woodcuts, simple and accurate descriptions, and all kinds of exotic animals alongside things they knew.

=== A History of British Birds ===
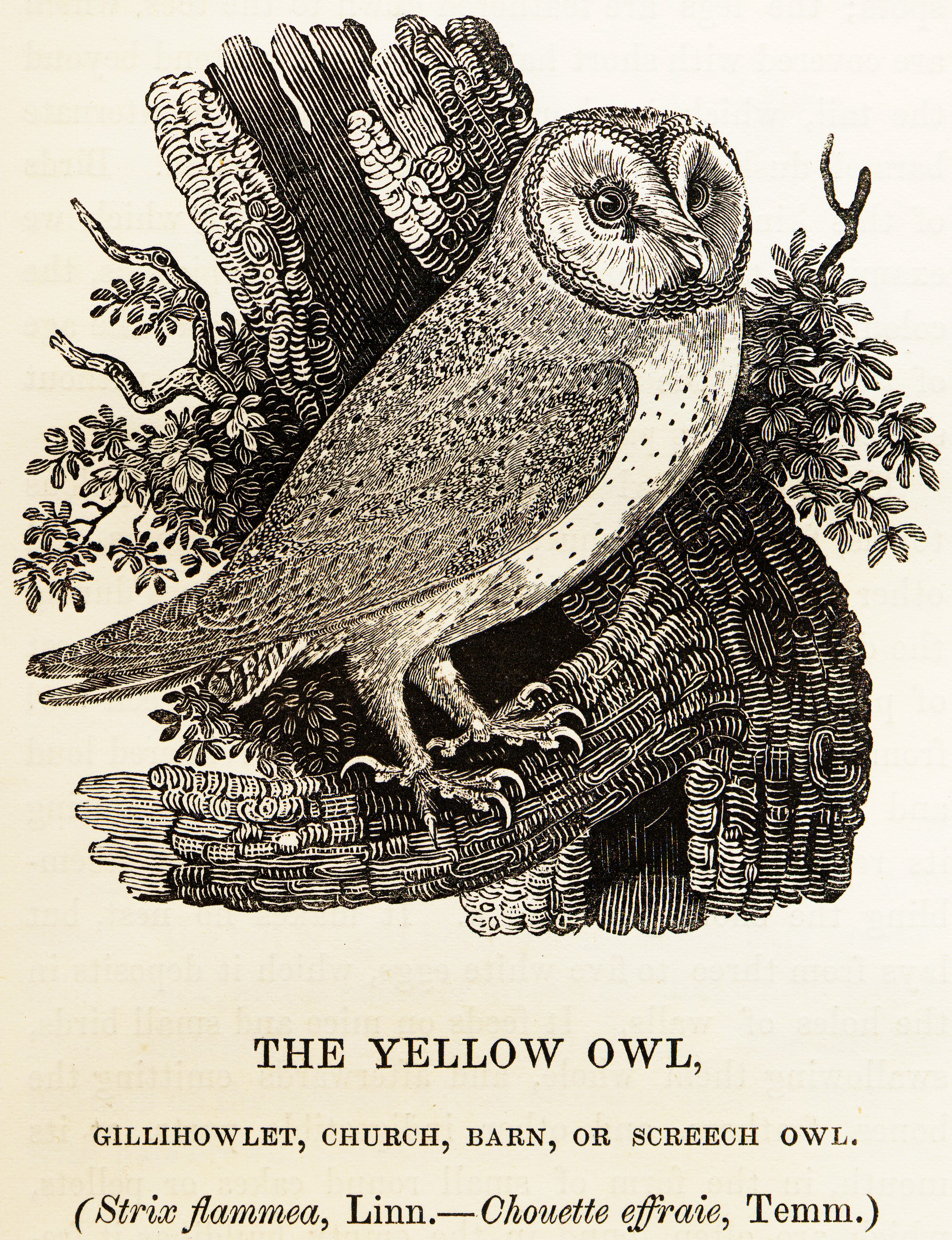
"The Yellow Owl" from British Birds, 1797

A History of British Birds, Bewick's great achievement and with which his name is inseparably associated, was published in two volumes: History and Description of Land Birds in 1797 and History and Description of Water Birds in 1804, with a supplement in 1821. The Birds is specifically British, but is the forerunner of all modern field guides. Bewick was helped by his intimate knowledge of the habits of animals acquired during his frequent excursions into the country. He also recounts information passed to him by acquaintances and local gentry, and that obtained in natural history works of his time, including those by Thomas Pennant and Gilbert White, as well as the translation of Buffon's Histoire naturelle.

Many of the illustrations that have most frequently been reproduced in other books and as decorations are the small tailpieces that Bewick had placed at the bottoms of the pages of the original. The worlds depicted are so small that a magnifying glass is necessary to examine their detail; each scene, as Adrian Searle writes, "is a small and often comic revelation", each tiny image giving "enormous pleasure"; Bewick "was as inventive as he was observant, as funny and bleak as he was exacting and faithful to the things he saw around him."

Bewick's biographer, Jenny Uglow, writes that

Bewick appears to have had a faultless sense of exactly what line was needed, and above all where to stop, as if there were no pause for analysis or reflection between the image in the mind and the hand on the wood. This skill, which has made later generations of engravers pause in awe, could be explained as an innate talent, the je-ne-sais-quoi of "genius". But it also came from the constant habit of drawing as a child, the painstaking learning of technique as an apprentice ...

A page from The fables of Aesop, and others, with designs on wood by Thomas Bewick (1823) showing his trademark fingerprint signature.

Bewick sometimes used his fingerprint as a form of signature, (accompanied by the words "Thomas Bewick his mark"), as well as engraving it in one of his tail-pieces as if it had clouded the tiny image of a rustic scene with a cottage by mistake. Uglow notes one critic's suggestion that Bewick may have meant we are looking at the scene through a playfully smudged window, as well as drawing our attention to Bewick, the maker. Adrian Searle, writing in The Guardian, describes the tiny work as "A visual equivalent to the sorts of authorial gags Laurence Sterne played in Tristram Shandy, it is a marvellous, timeless, magical joke."

== Tributes ==
Poetical tributes came to Bewick even during his lifetime. William Wordsworth began his anecdotal poem "The Two Thieves", composed in 1798, with the line "O now that the genius of Bewick were mine", in which case he would give up writing, he declared.

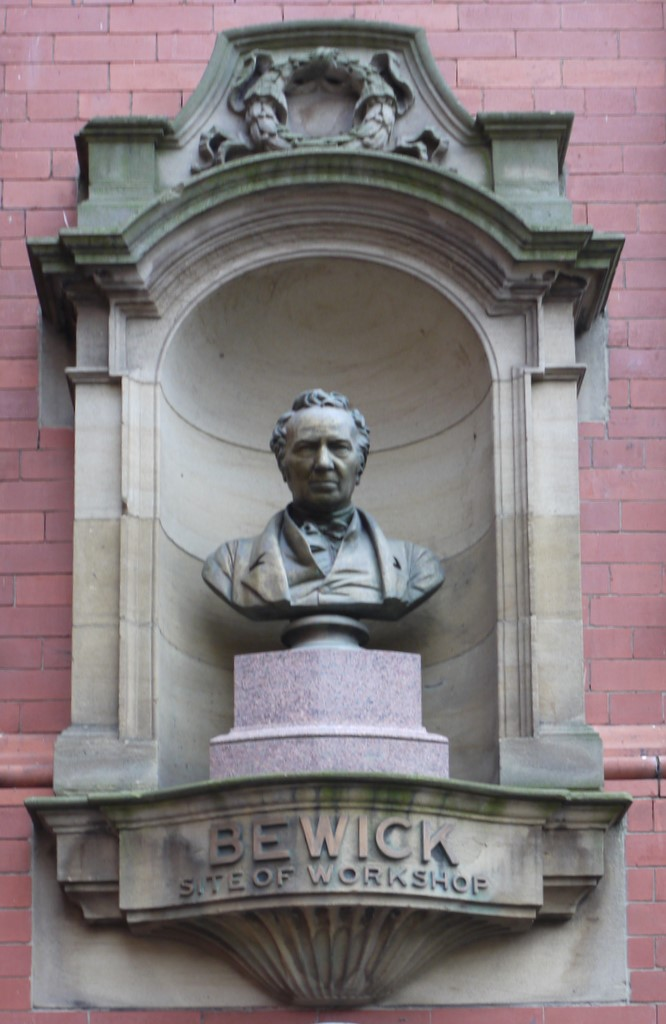
Bust based on a design by Edward Hodges Baily at the site of Bewick's workshop in St Nicholas churchyard

In 1823, Bewick's friend the Reverend J. F. M. Dovaston dedicated a sonnet to him with the lines

Xylographer I name thee, Bewick, taught
By thy wood-Art, that from rock, flood, and tree
Home to our hearths, all lively, light and free
In suited scene each living thing has brought
As life elastic, animate with thought.

Four years after his death, his sixteen-year-old admirer Charlotte Brontë wrote a poem of 20 quatrains titled "Lines on the celebrated Bewick" which describe the various scenes she comes across while leafing through the books illustrated by him. Her 1847 novel Jane Eyre has the title character as a mistreated child reading History of British Birds in Chapter 1: "With Bewick on my knee, I was then happy: happy at least in my way". Later still, the poet Alfred Tennyson left his own tribute on the flyleaf of a copy of Bewick's History of British Birds found in Lord Ravenscroft's library:

A gate and field half ploughed,
A solitary cow,
A child with a broken slate,
And a titmarsh in the bough.
But where, alack, is Bewick
To tell the meaning now?

There are numerous portraits of Bewick. In 1825, the Literary and Philosophical Society commissioned Edward Hodges Baily to sculpt a marble portrait bust of Bewick; there are several copies beside the one still at the Society itself. According to Uglow, when Bewick came to sit for the sculptor, he "stoutly refused to be portrayed in a toga. Instead he wore his ordinary coat and waistcoat with neckcloth and ruffled shirt, and even asked for some of his smallpox scars to be shown." Baily was so taken with him that he presented Bewick with a plaster model of the finished bust. A bronze copy now rests in a niche of the building that replaced his workshop in the churchyard of Saint Nicholas (see above) and still another is at the British Museum. There is also a full-length statue of him at the top left of the former chemist's shop designed by M.V.Treleaven at 45 Northumberland Street in the city.

== Legacy ==
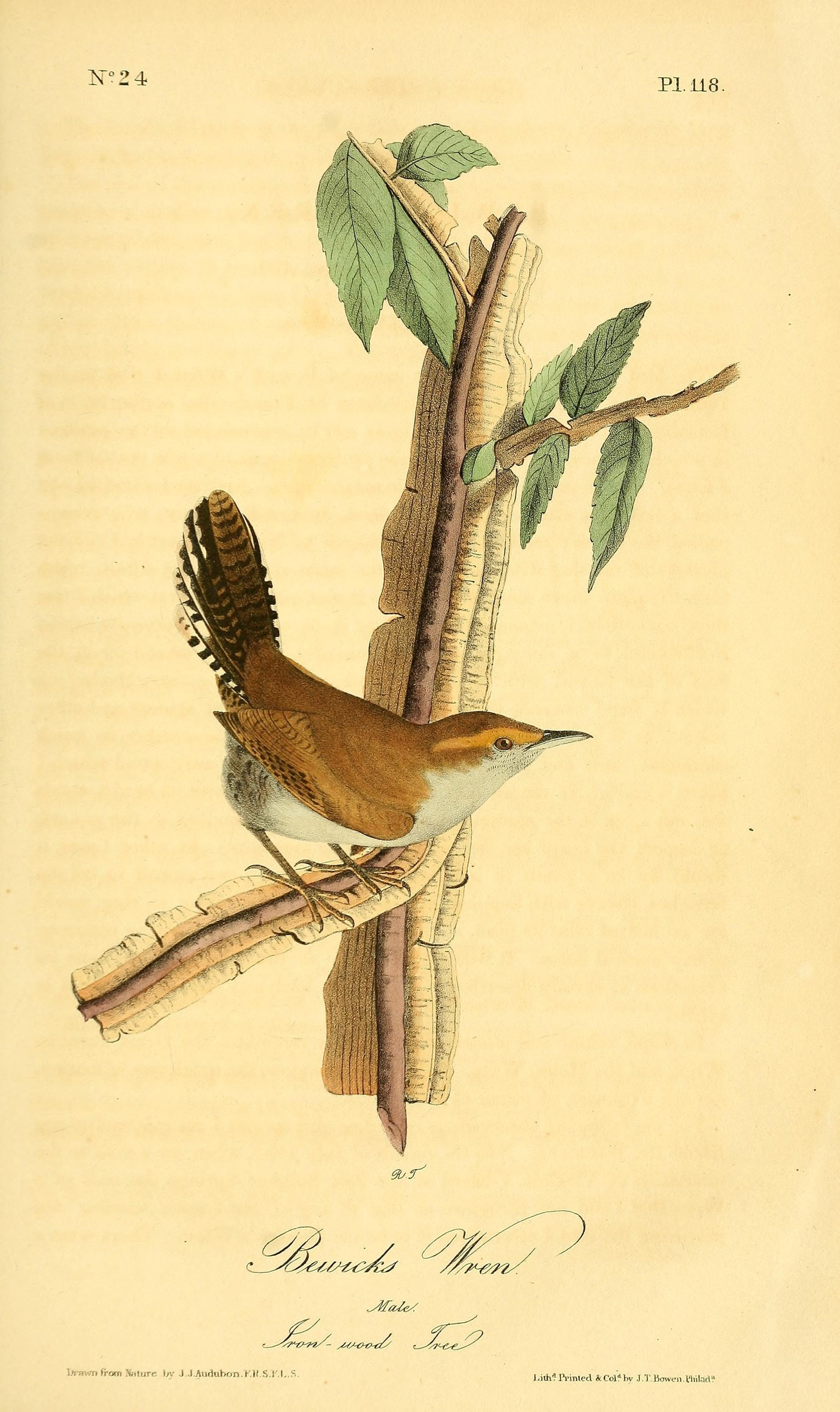
James Audubon illustration of Bewick’s Wren

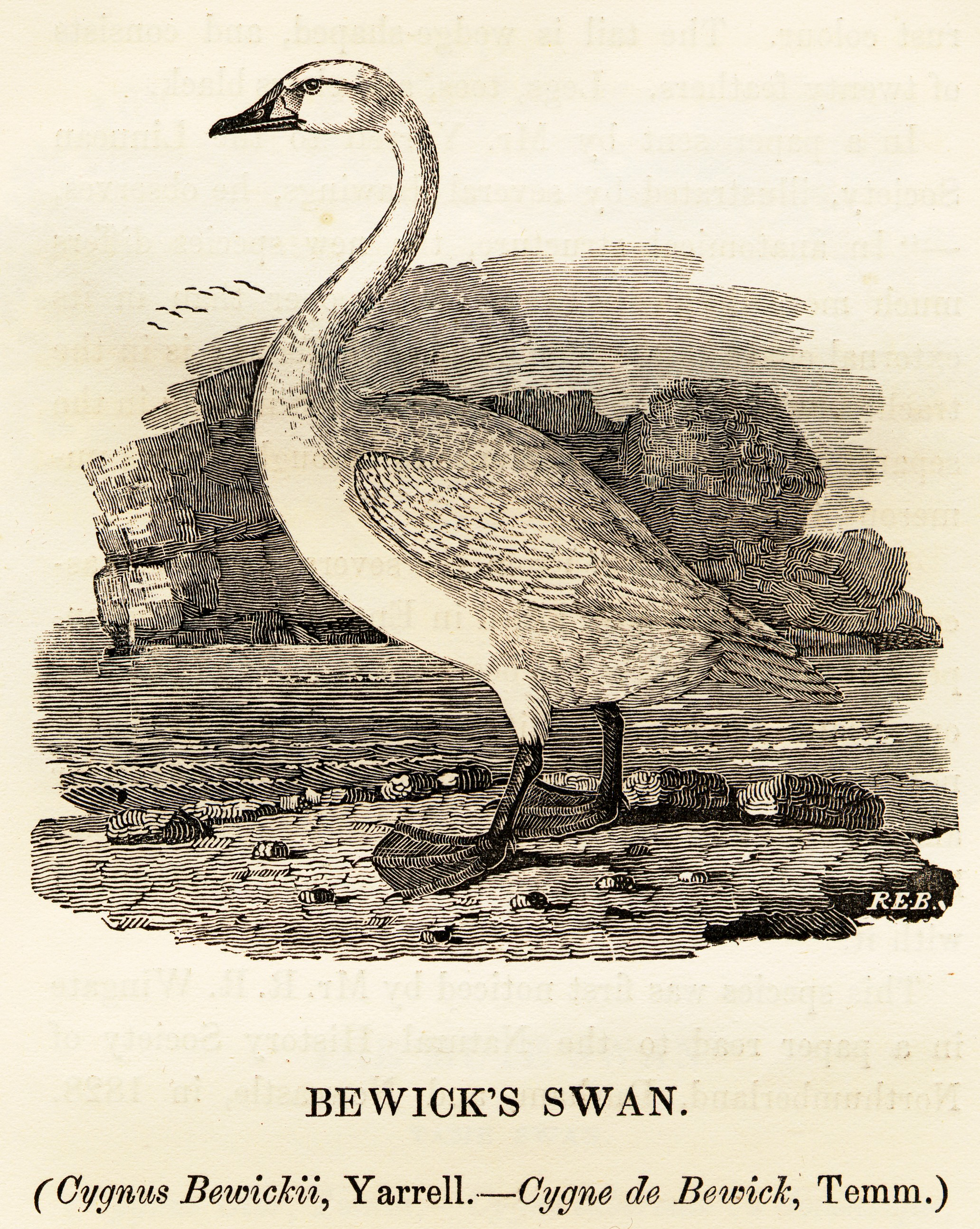
Woodcut by Robert Elliot Bewick of the swan named after his father

Bewick's fame, already nationwide across Britain for his Birds, grew during the nineteenth century. In 1827, the American ornithologist John James Audubon illustrated the North American bird he dubbed Bewick's wren under the binomial name Troglodytes bewickii (now Thryomanes bewickii) in his The Birds of America, explaining in 1831 that he had named it for his friend Thomas Bewick. In 1830, William Yarrell named Bewick's swan in his honour and Bewick's son Robert engraved the bird for later editions of British Birds.

The critic John Ruskin compared the subtlety of his drawing to that of Holbein, J. M. W. Turner, and Paolo Veronese writing that the way Bewick had engraved the feathers of his birds was "the most masterly thing ever done in woodcutting". His fame faded as illustration became more widespread and more mechanical, but twentieth-century artists such as Gwen Raverat continued to admire his skill, and work by artists such as Paul Nash and Eric Ravilious has been described as reminiscent of Bewick.

Hugh Dixon, reflecting on Bewick and the landscape of North-East England, wrote that

Bewick's illustrated books, admired since they first appeared, gave him some celebrity in his own lifetime. His Memoir, published a generation after his death, brought about a new interest and a widening respect which has continued to grow ever since. The attraction to his contemporaries of Bewick's observations lay in their accuracy and amusement. Two centuries later these qualities are still recognised; but so, too, is the wealth and rarity of the historical information they have to offer.

Thomas Bewick Primary School, in West Denton in Newcastle upon Tyne, is named after him. Bewick's works are held in collections including the British Museum and the Victoria and Albert Museum. Newcastle's City Library has a collection of works and associated items based on the Pease Bequest which was made to the city by John William Pease in 1901. Bewick is memorialised around Newcastle and Gateshead with streets named after him, and plaques mark his former homes and workshops.

== Gallery ==
=== Birds ===
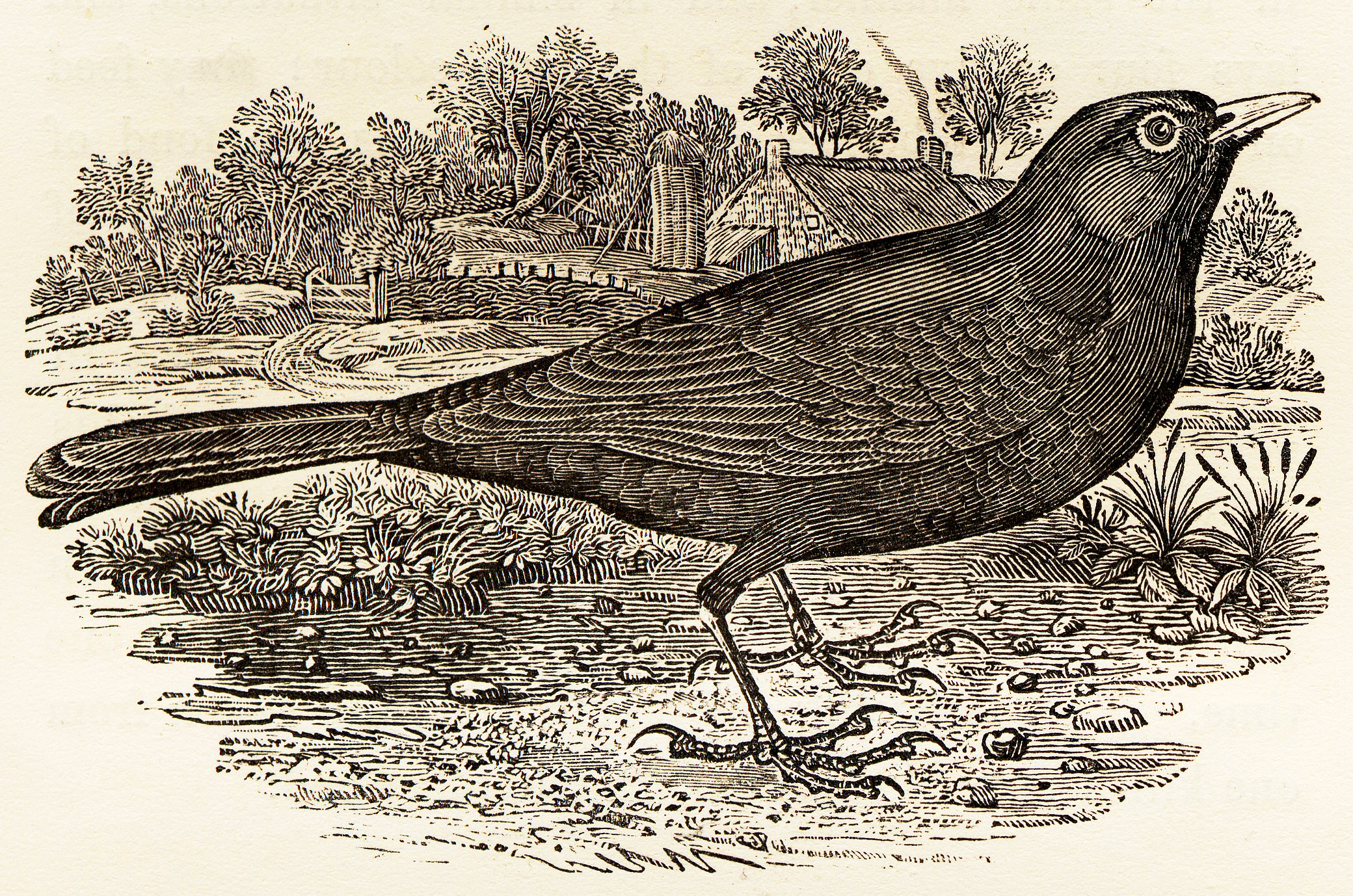
Blackbird

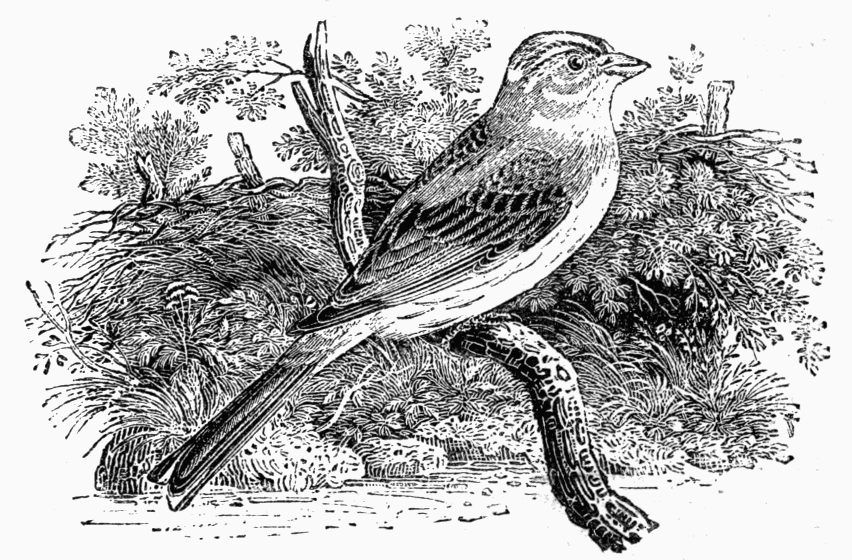
Yellowhammer

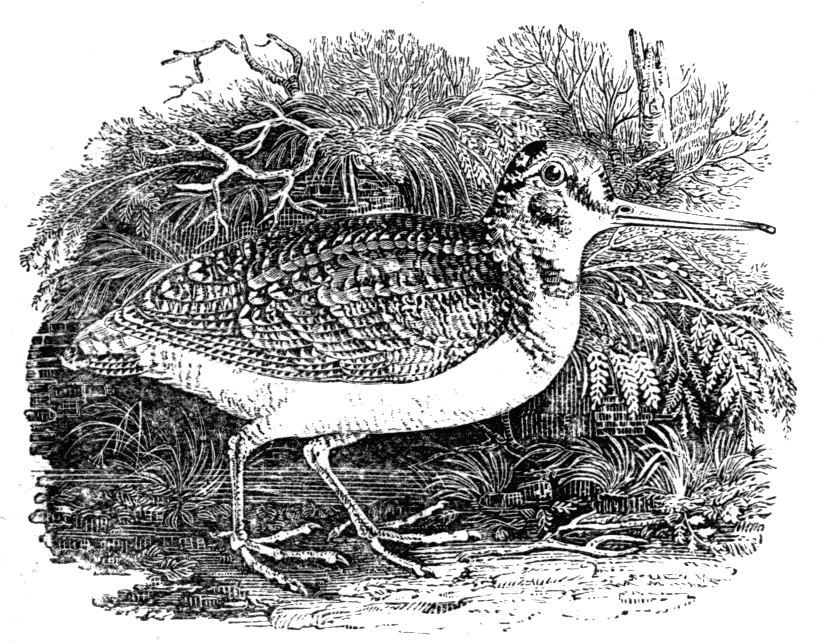
Woodcock

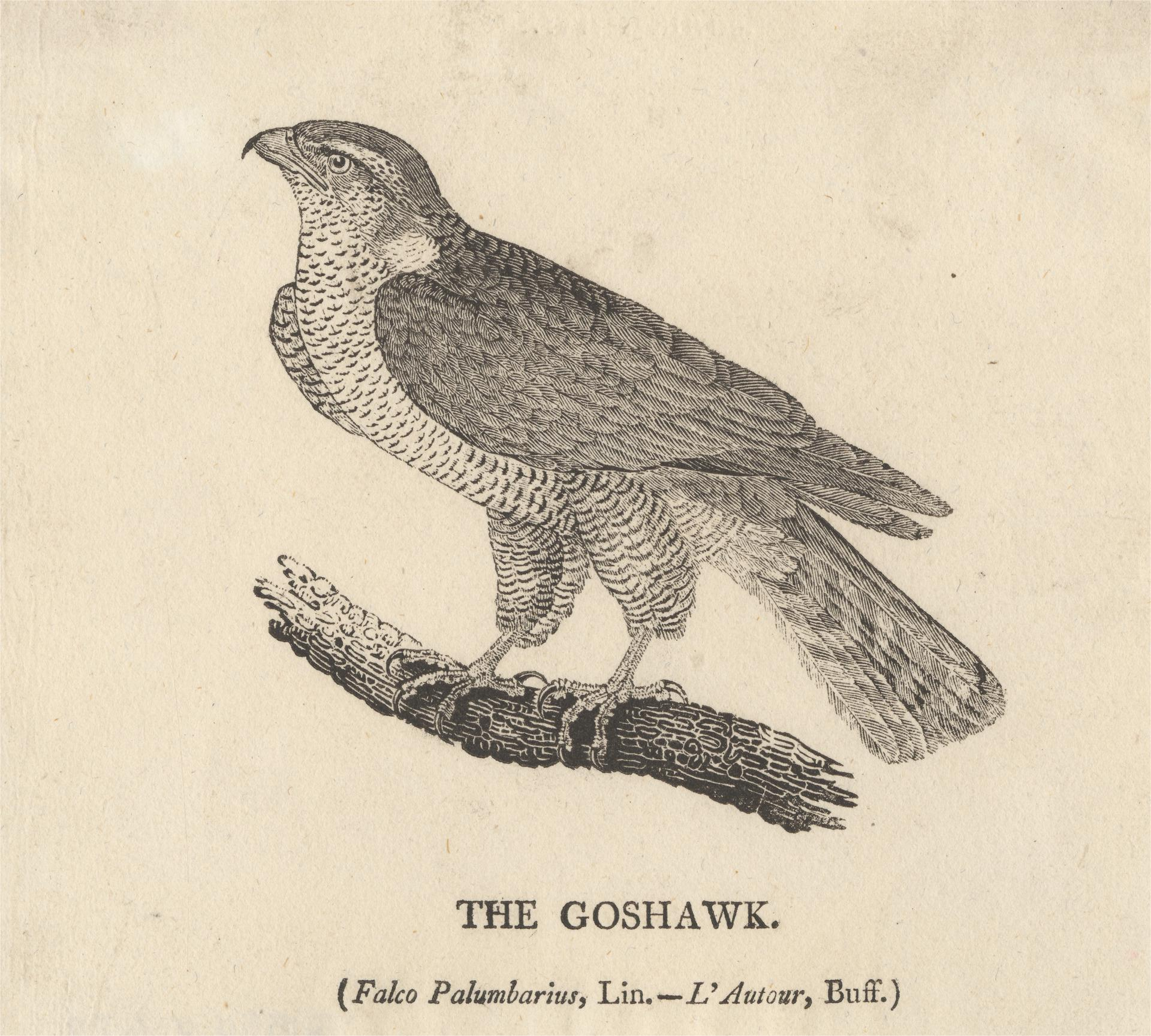
Goshawk

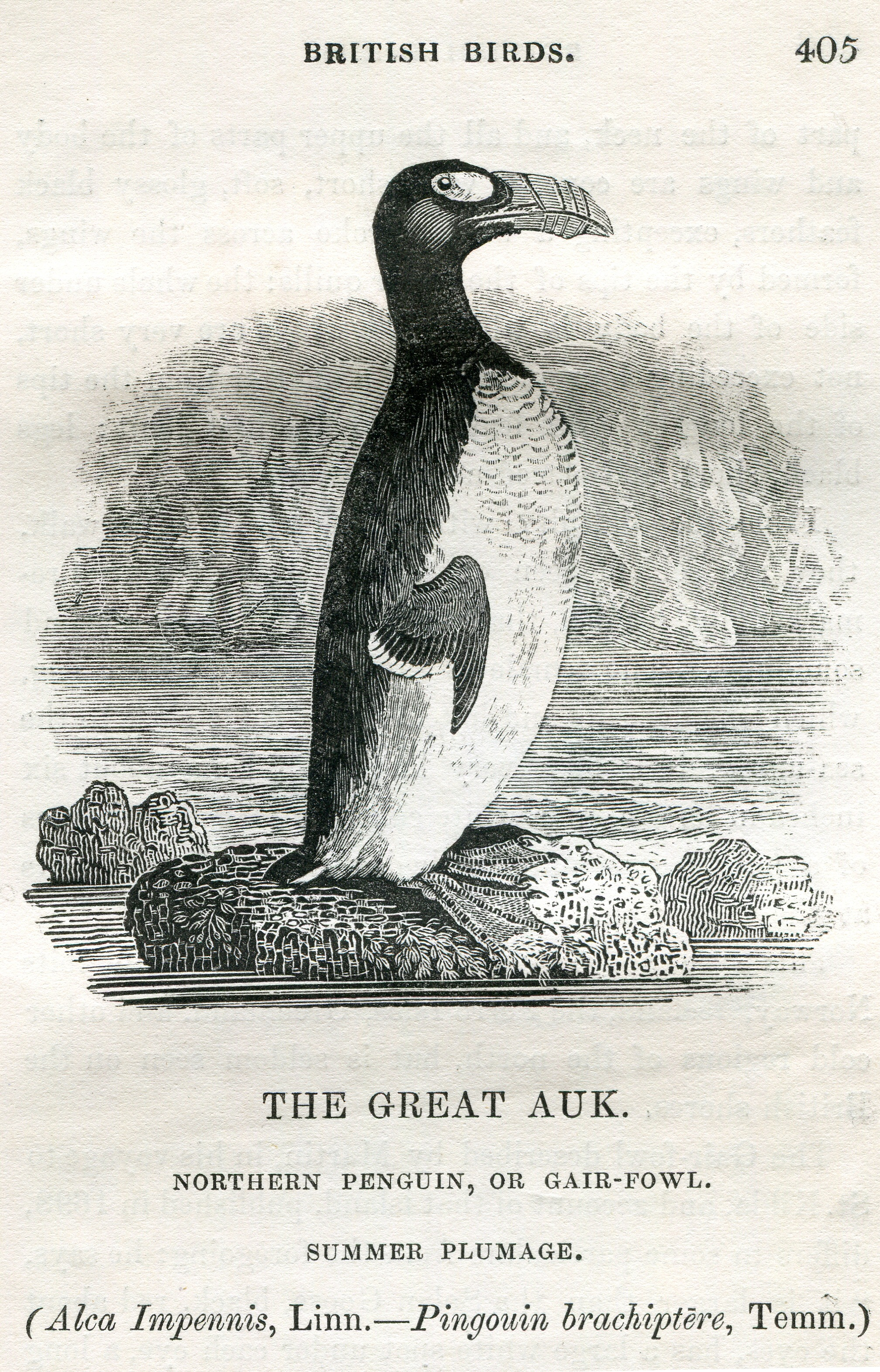
Great Auk

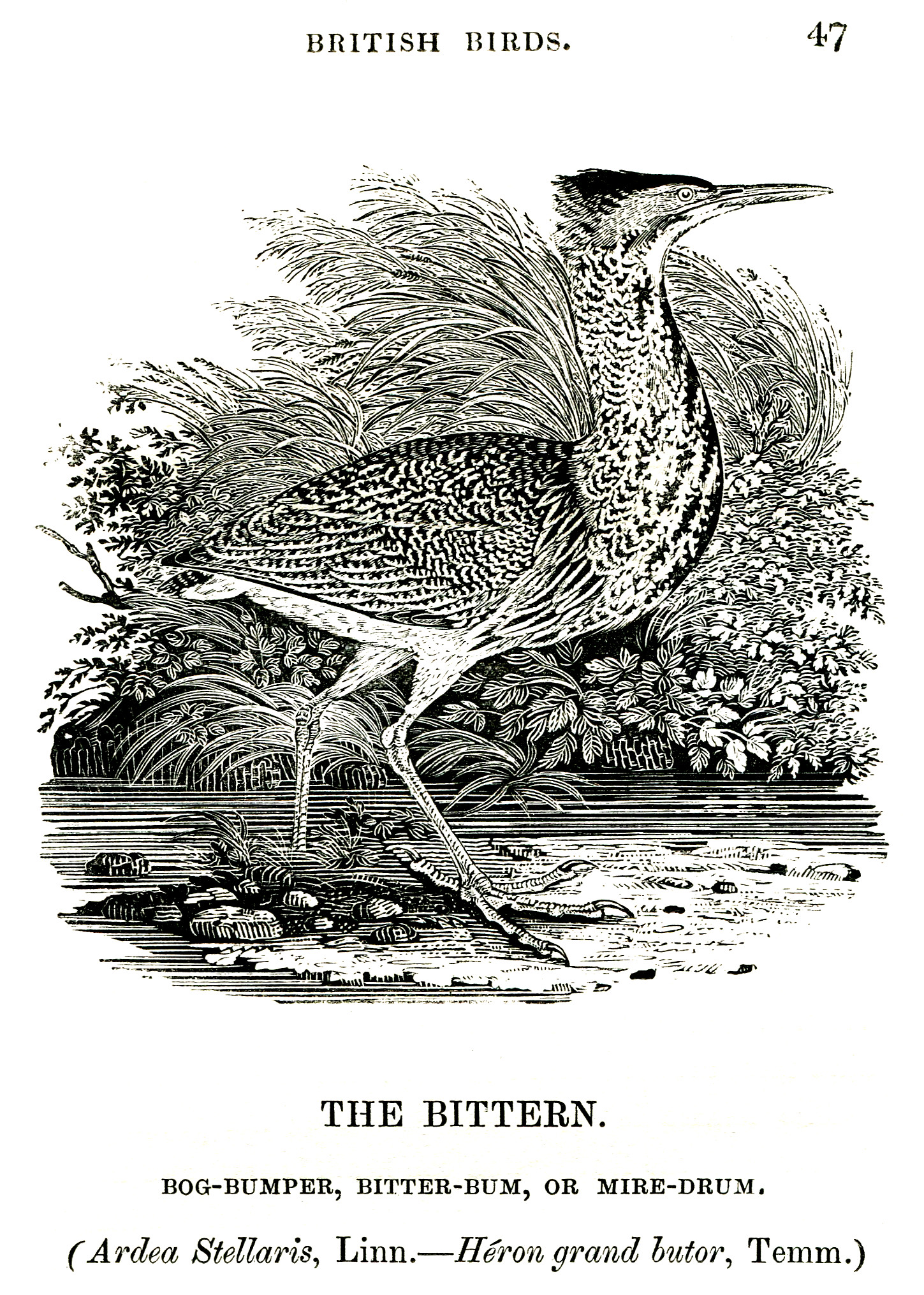
Bittern

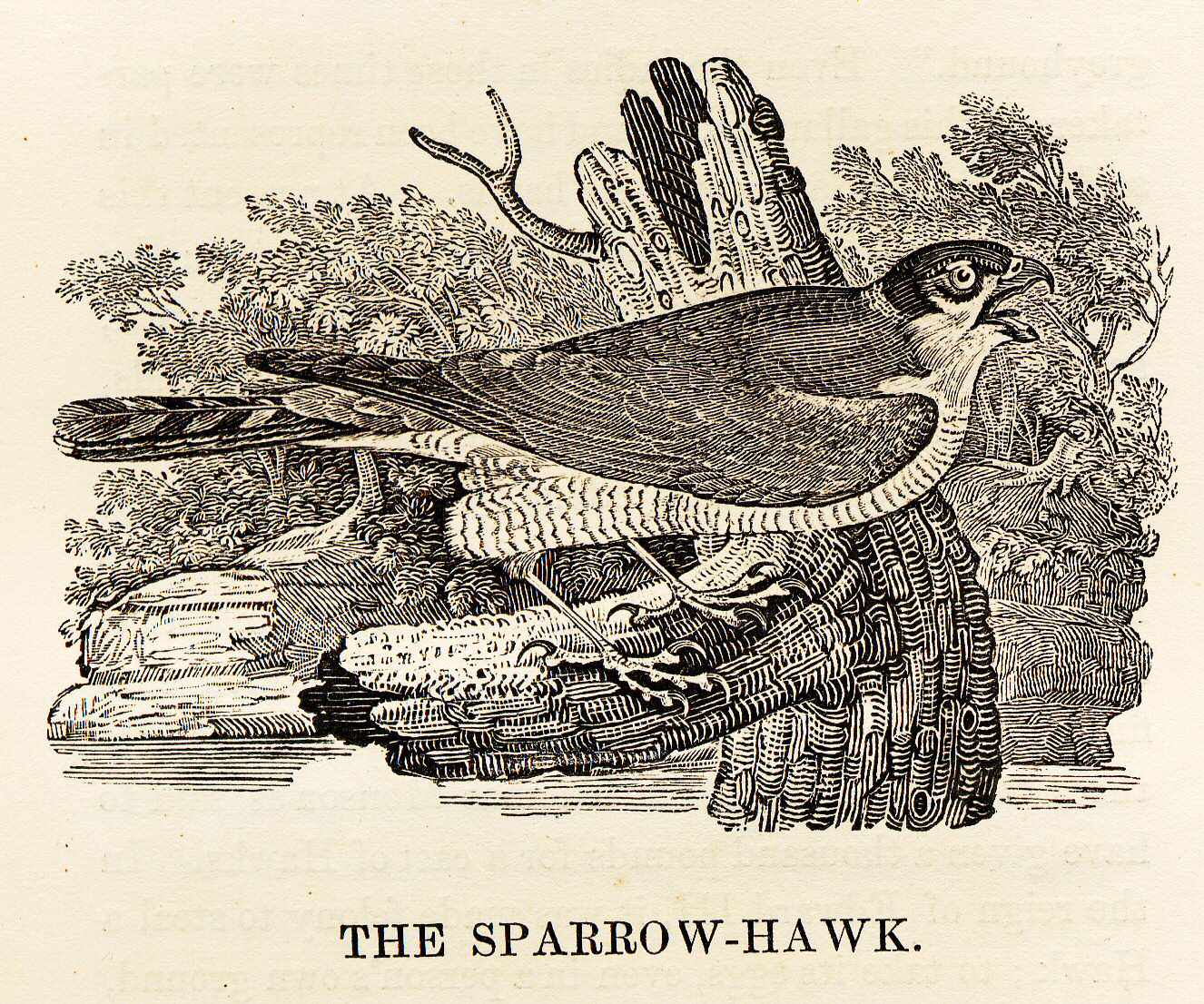
Sparrowhawk

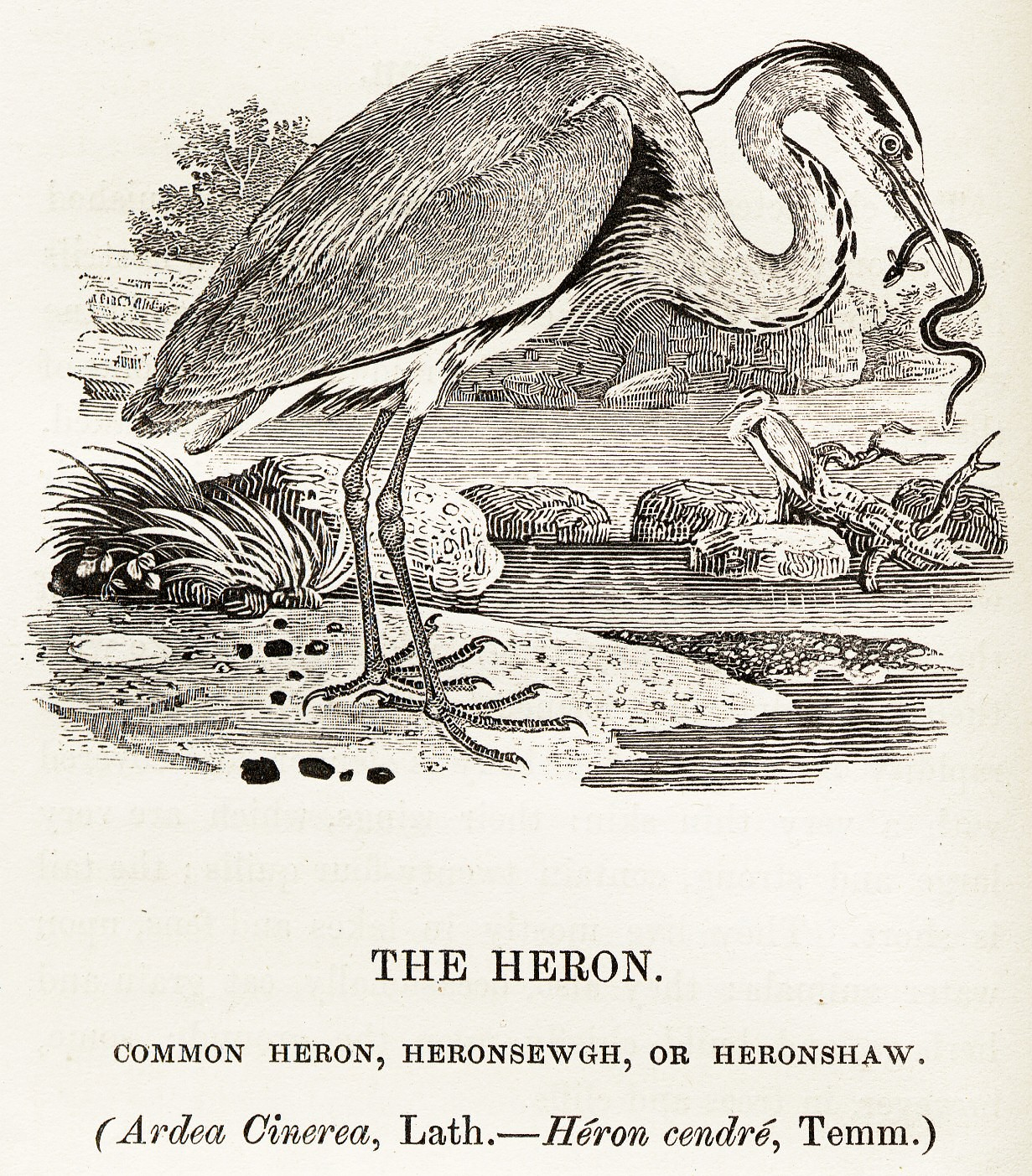
Heron

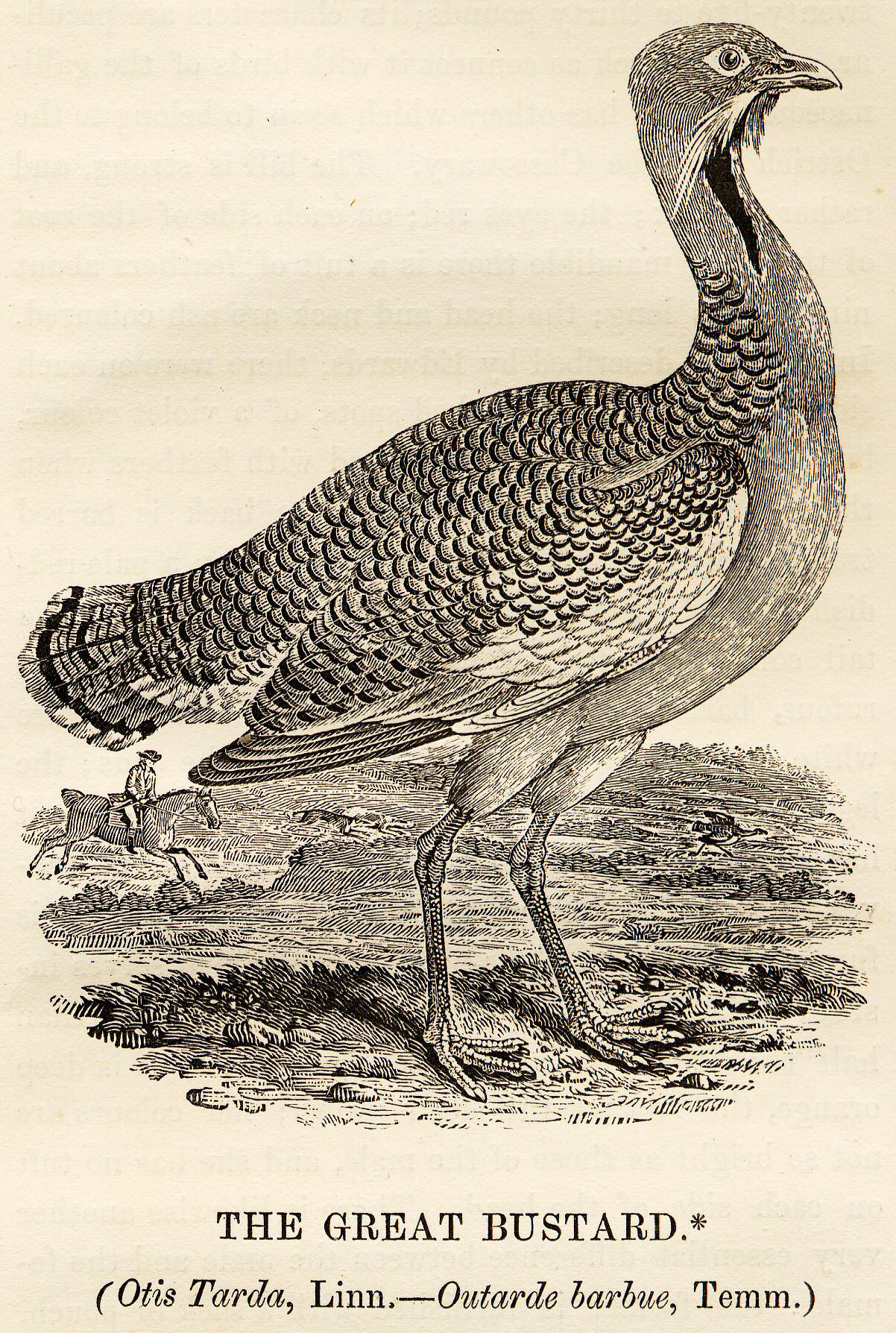
Great Bustard

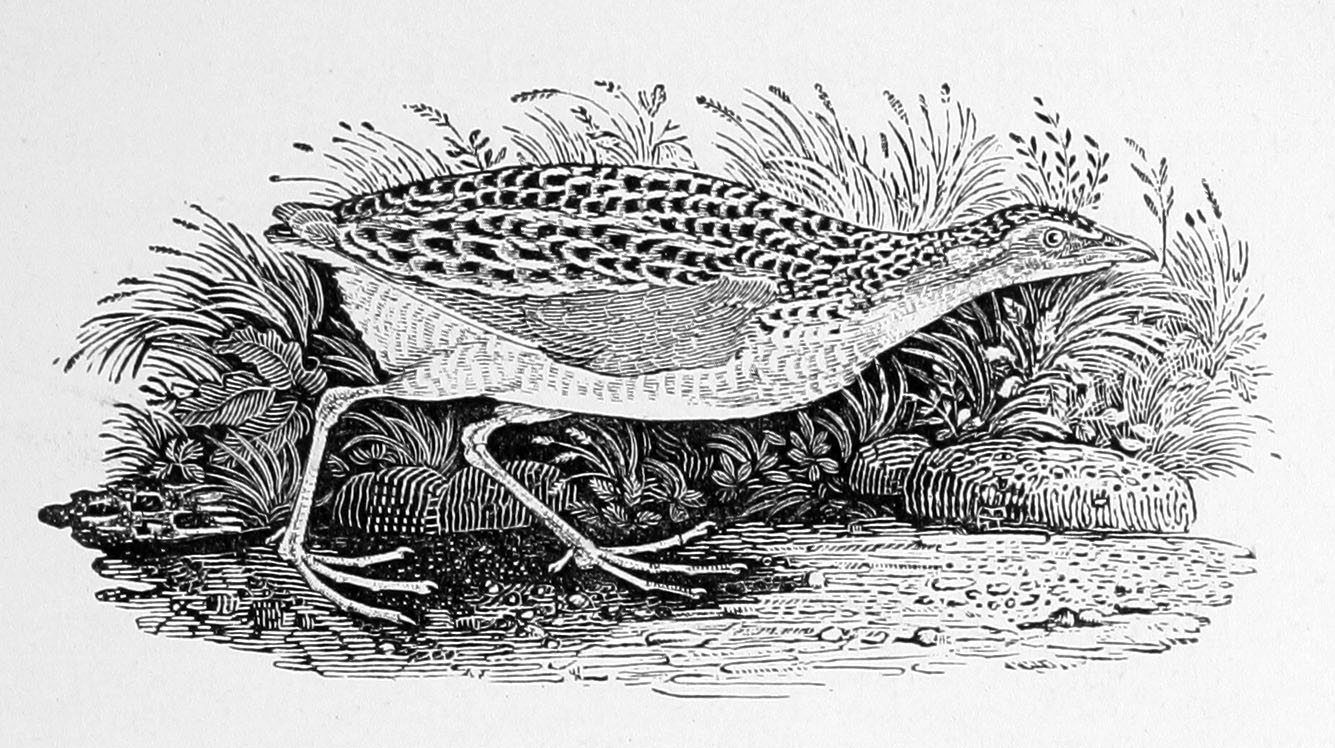
Rail

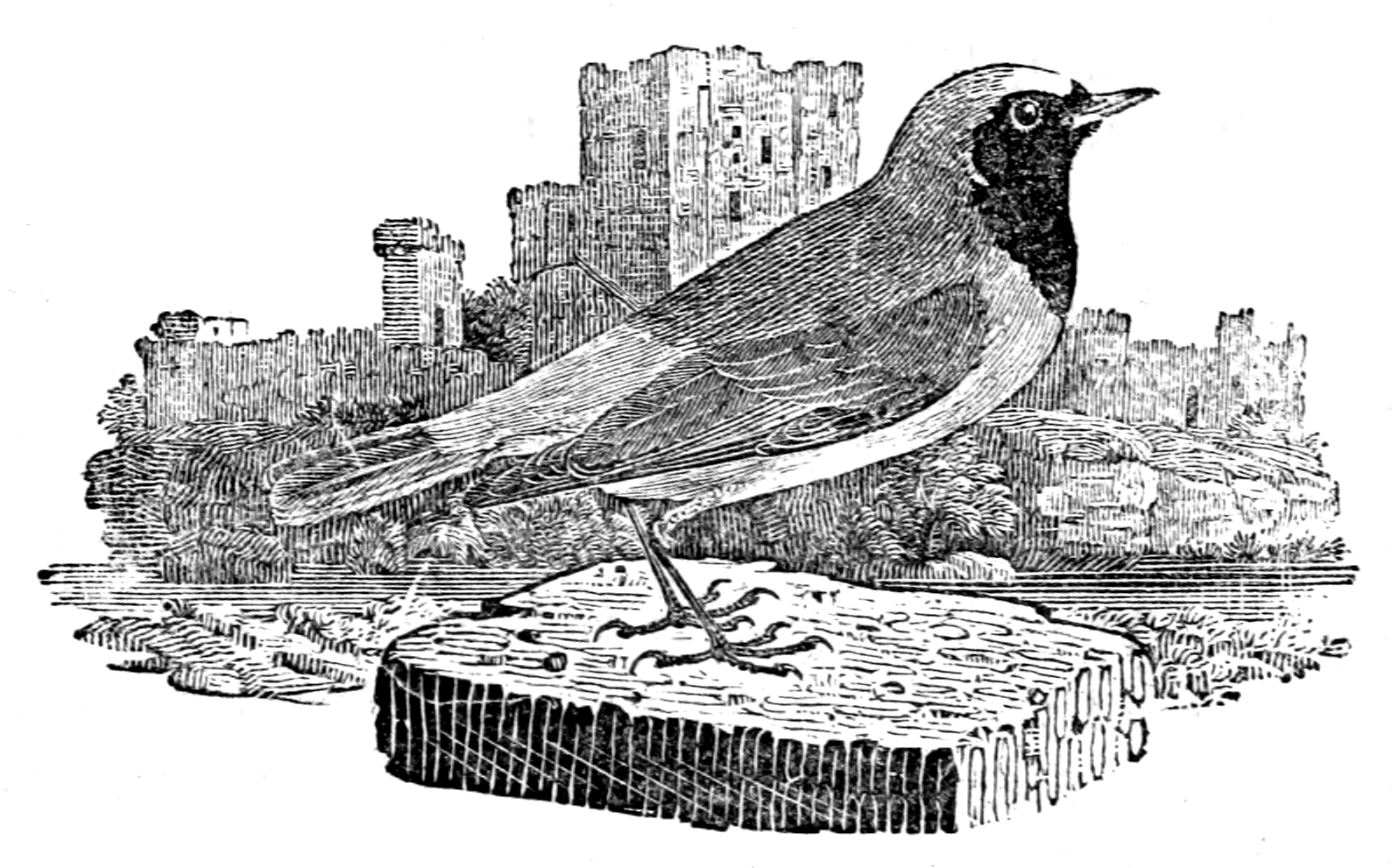
Redstart

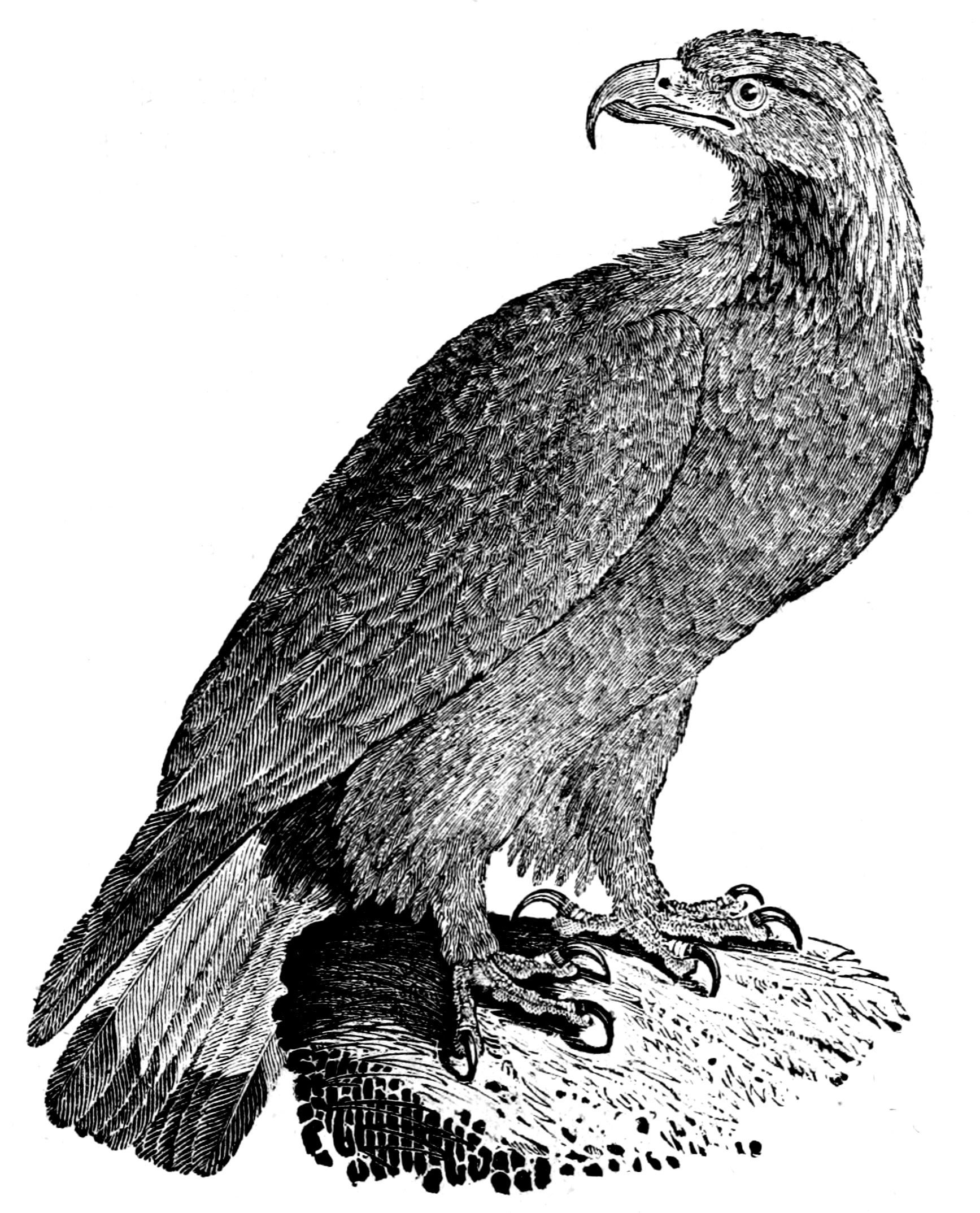
Ringtailed eagle

=== Mammals ("quadrupeds") ===
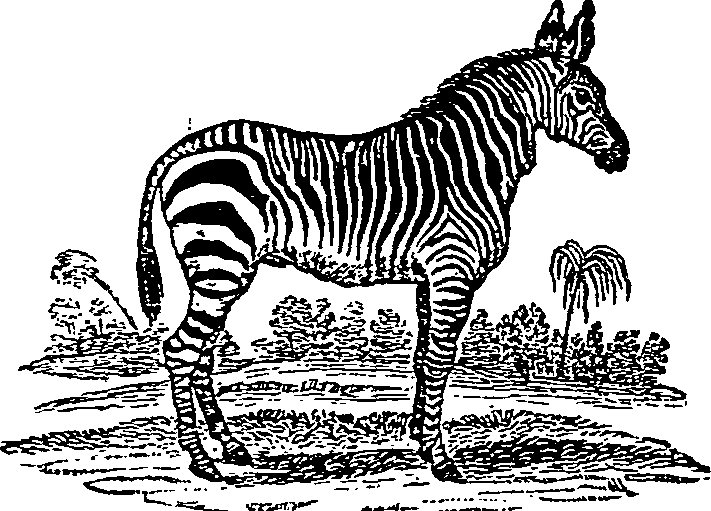
Zebra

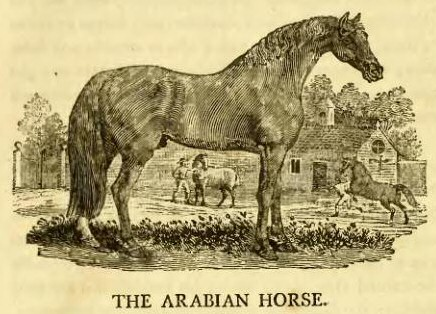
Arabian horse

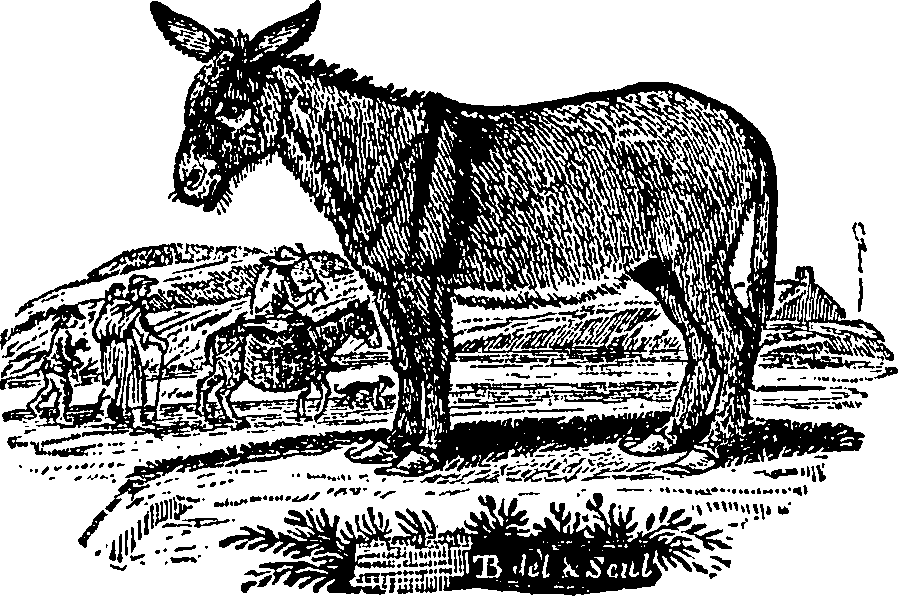
Ass

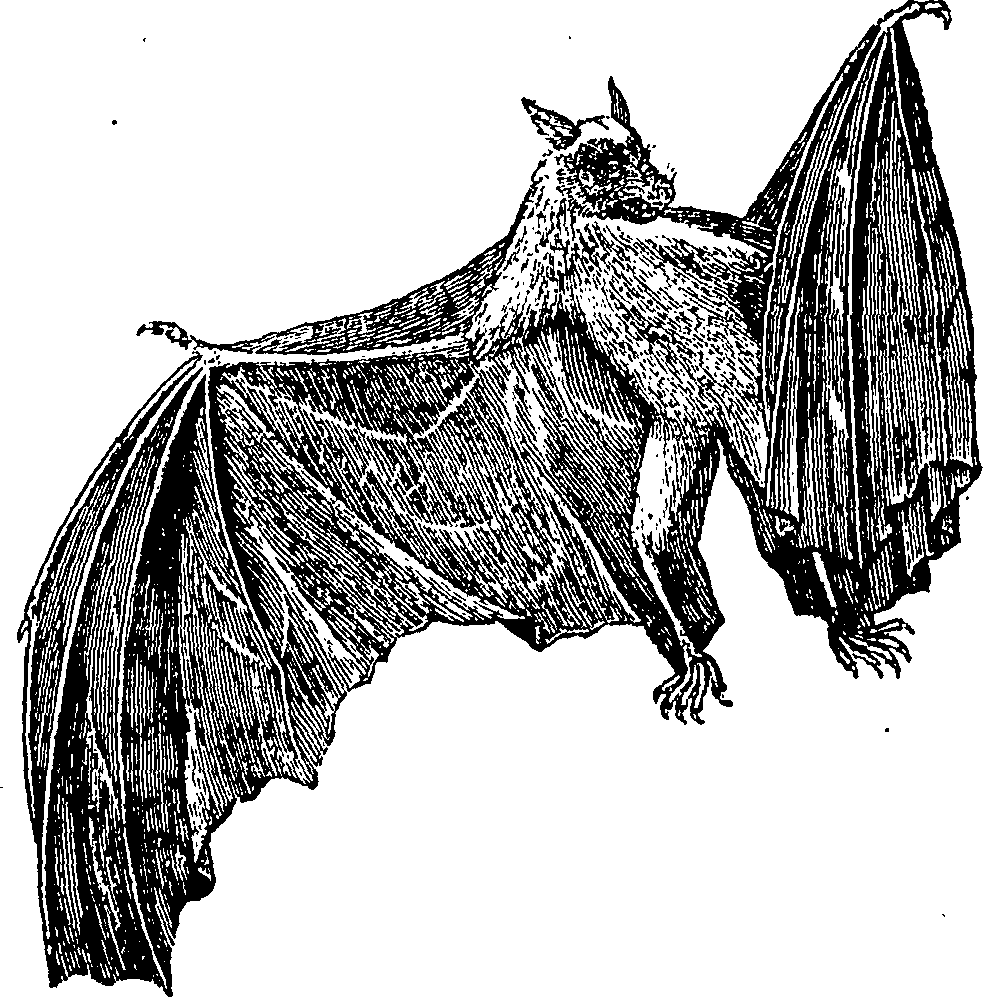
Bat

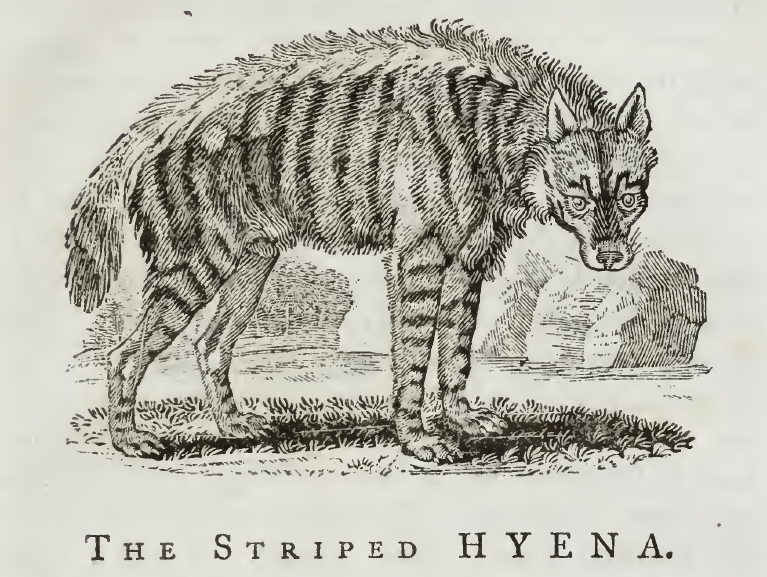
Striped hyena

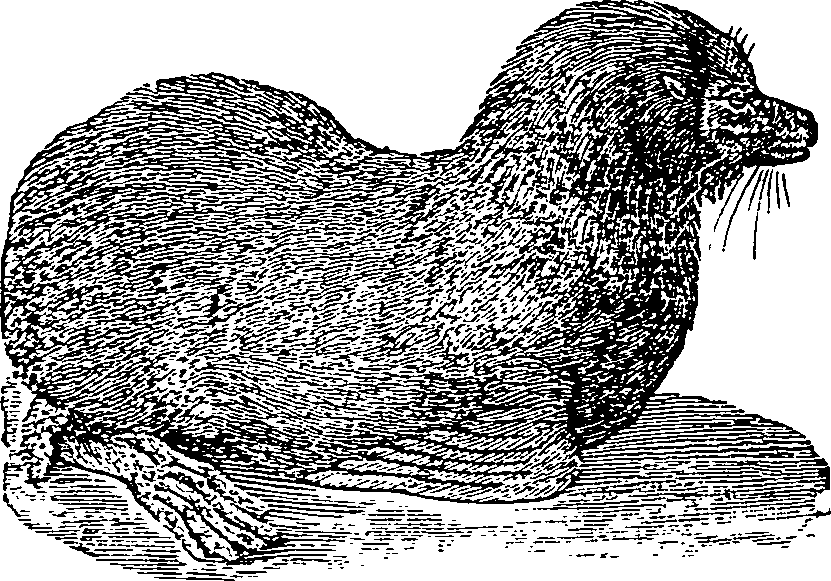
Ursine seal or sea bear (northern fur seal)

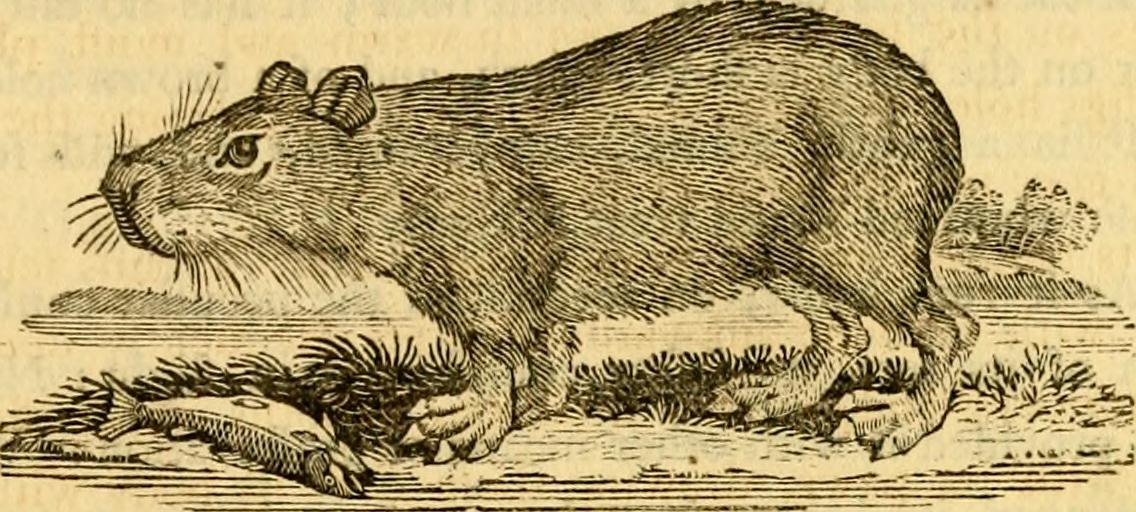
Capybara

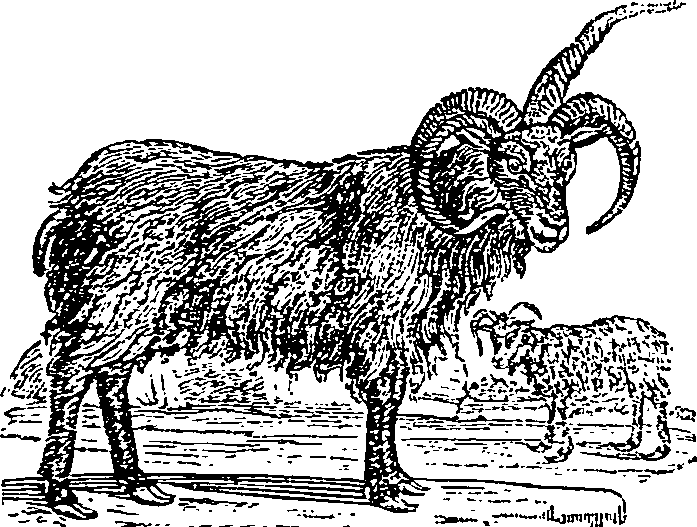
Many-horned sheep

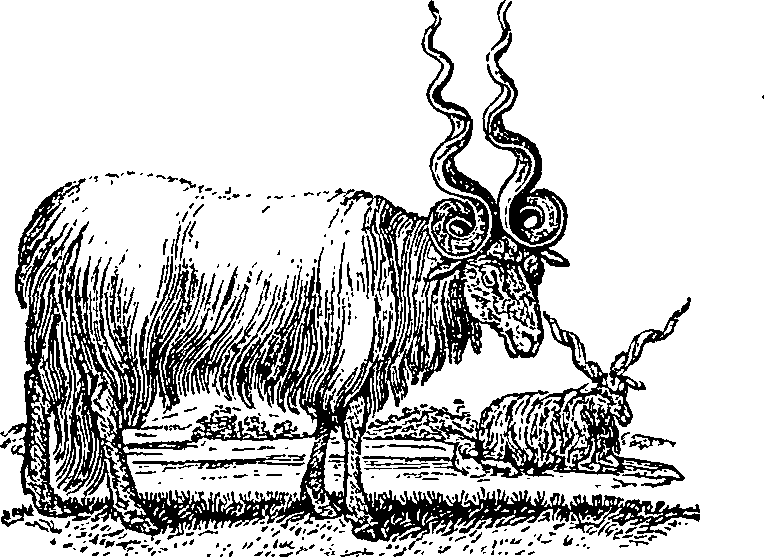
Wallachian sheep

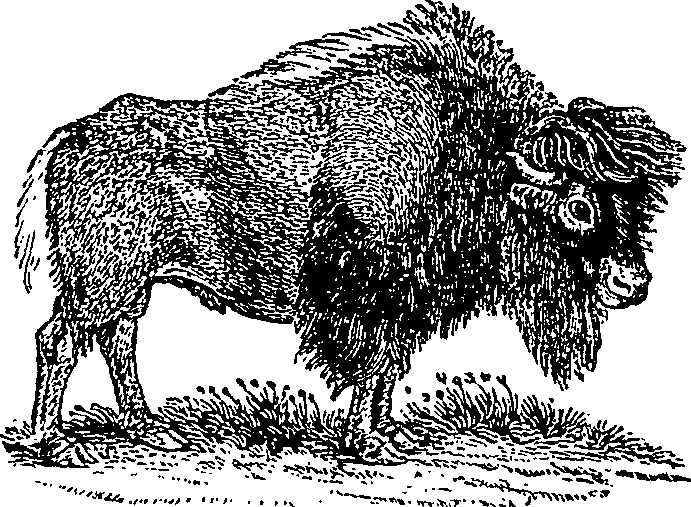
Bison

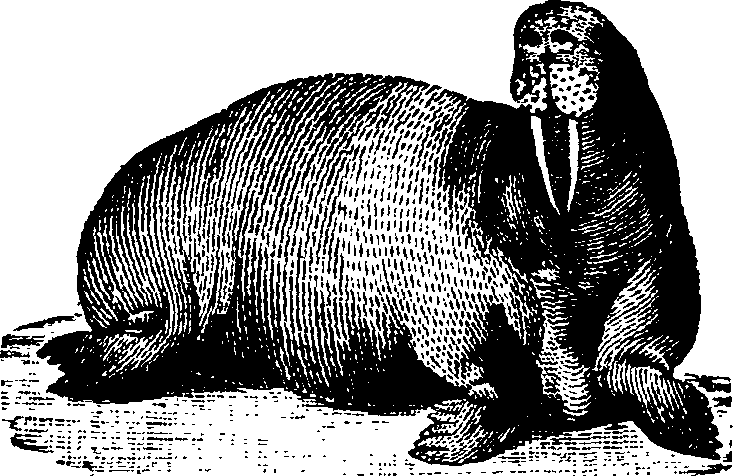
Walrus

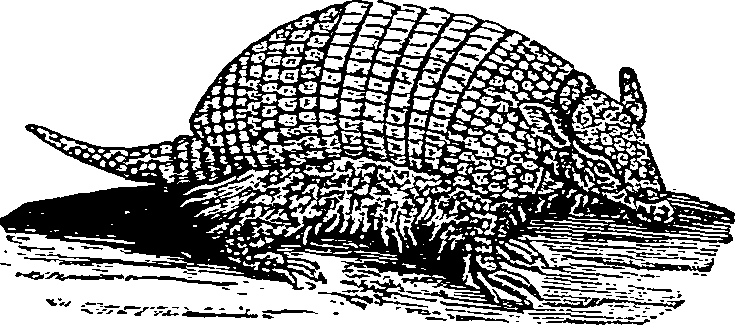
Armadillo

=== Tail-pieces and other illustrations ===
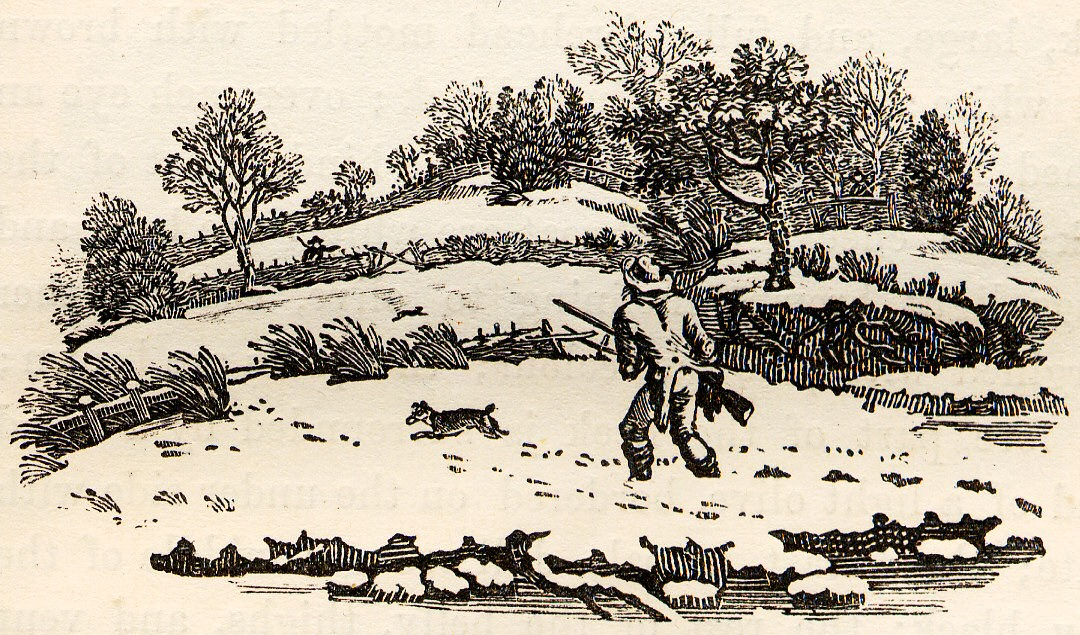
Hunter in the snow

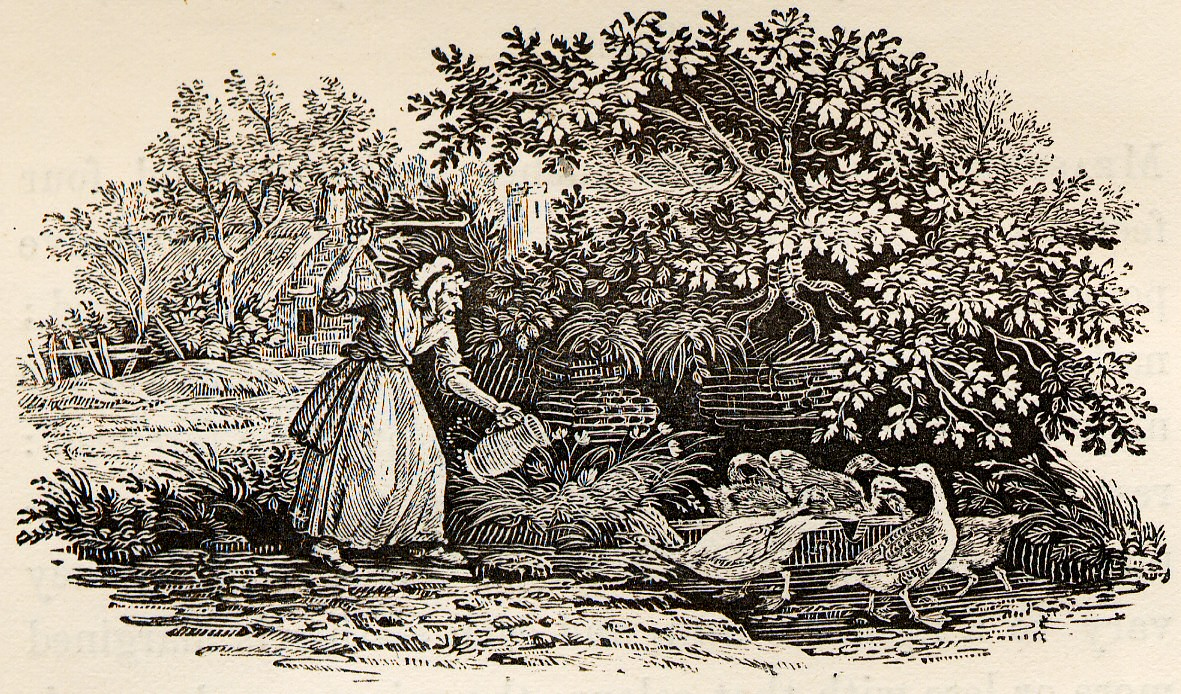
Old woman with ducks

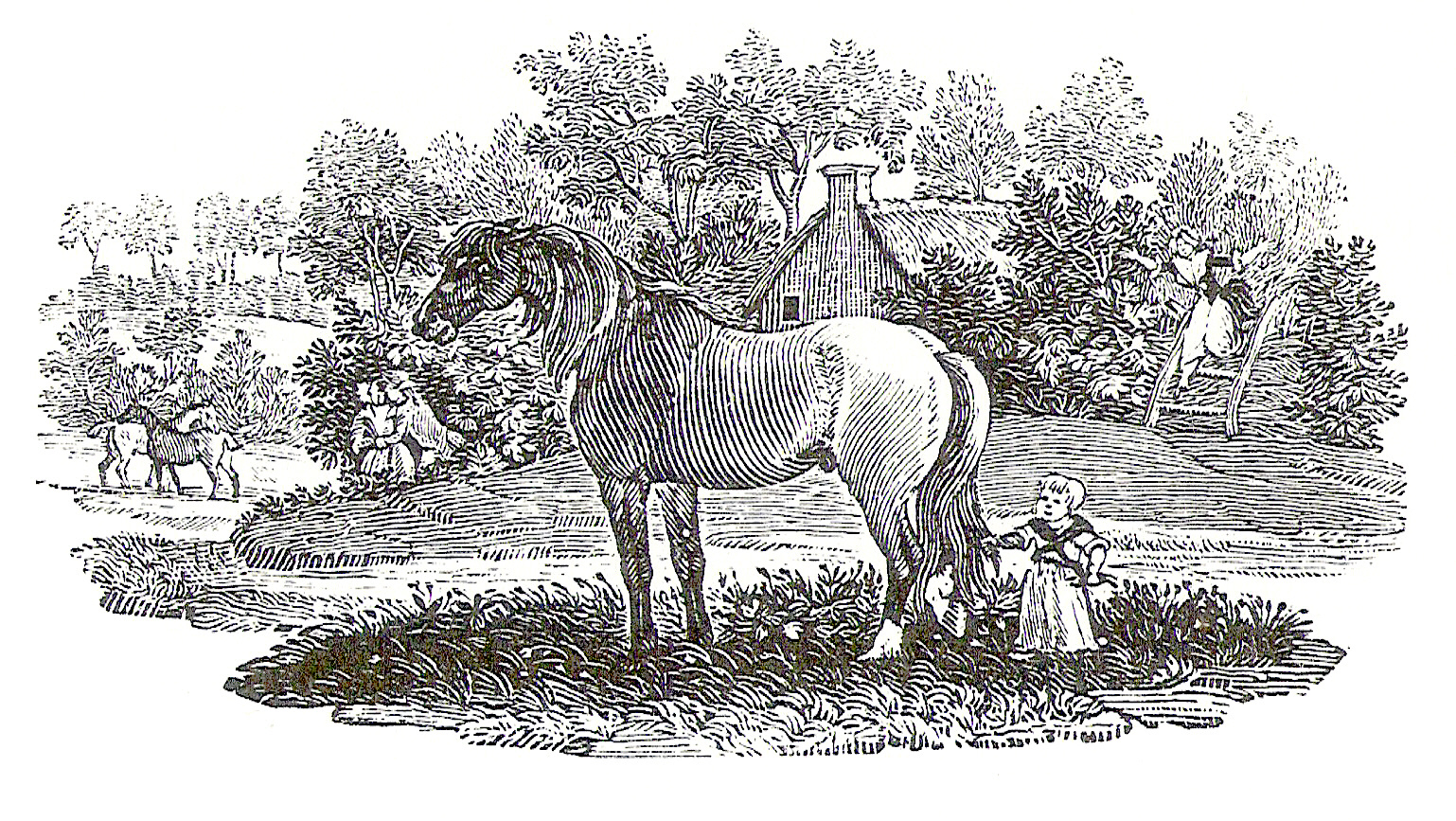
Child in peril for pulling colt’s tail

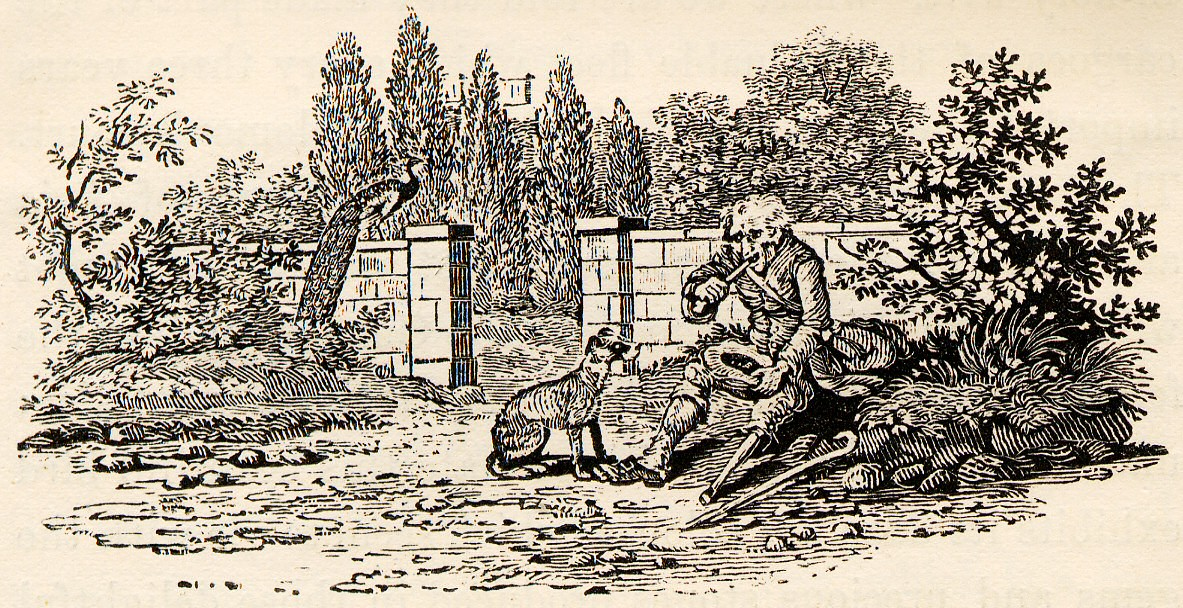
Pegleg man, dog and peacock

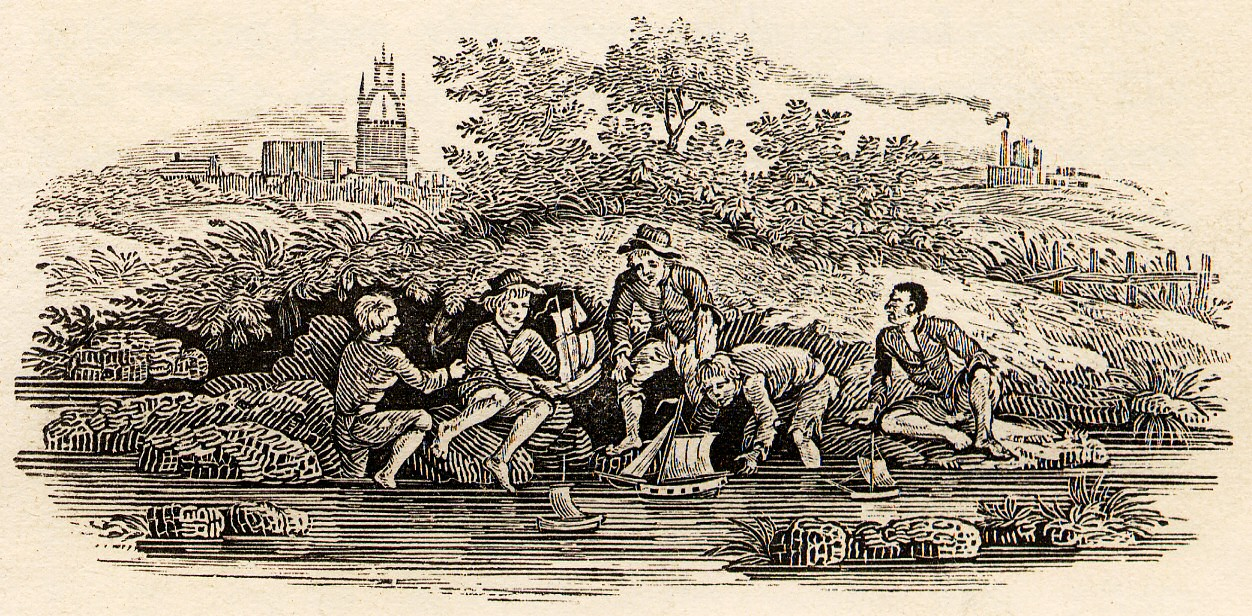
Toy boats in a river

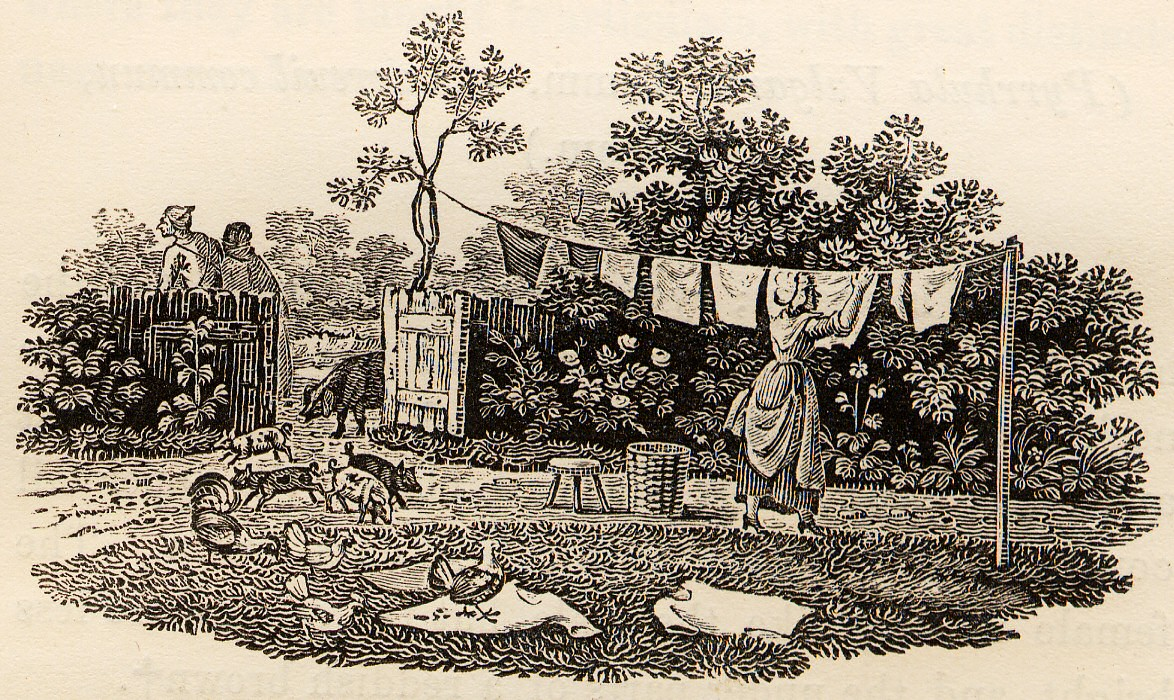
Hanging washing, with pigs and chickens

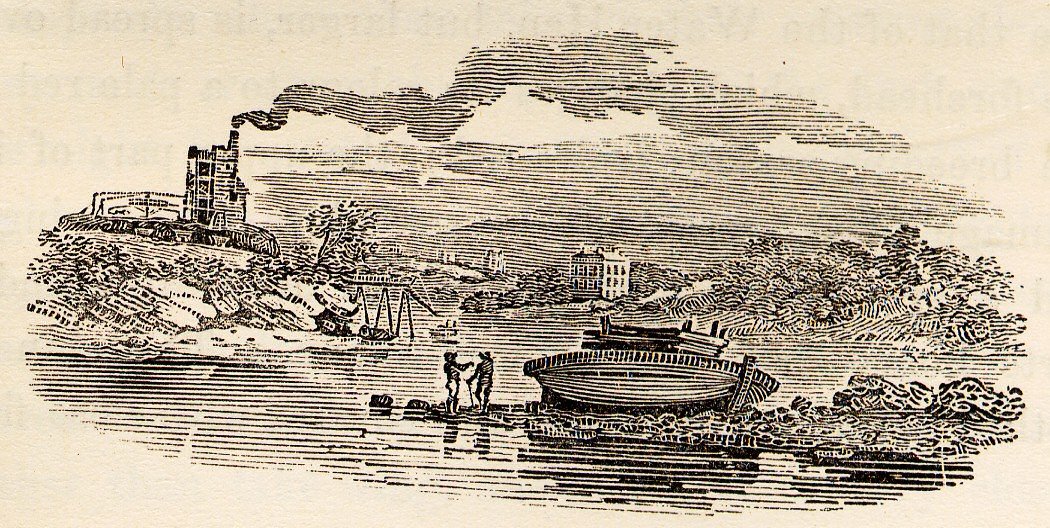
Industry on a riverside

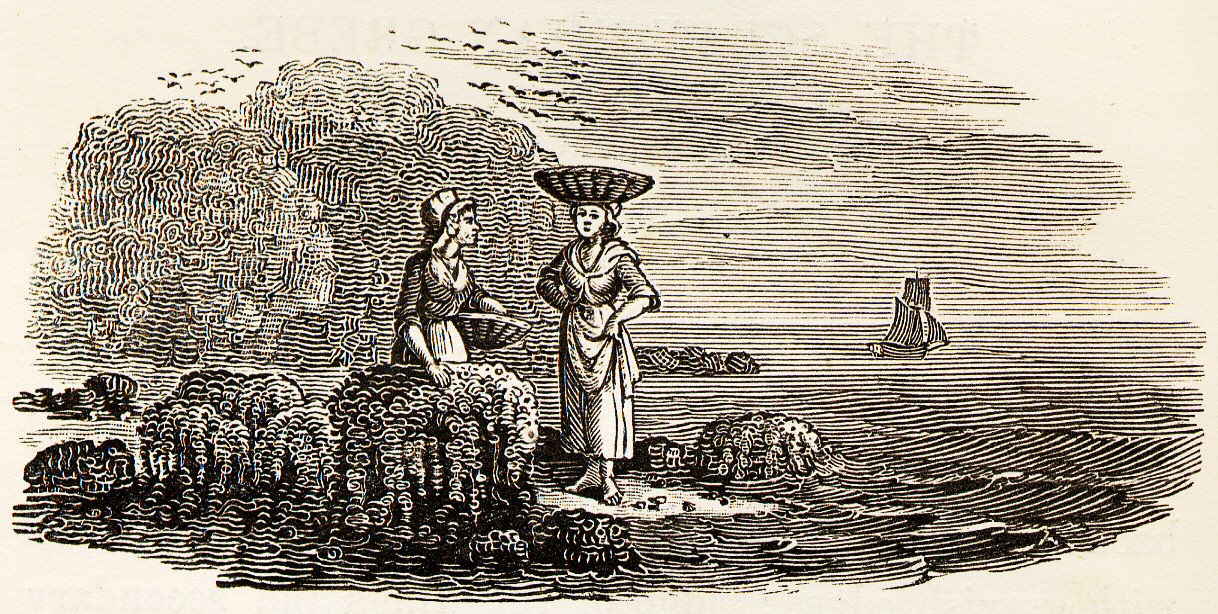
Women collecting shellfish

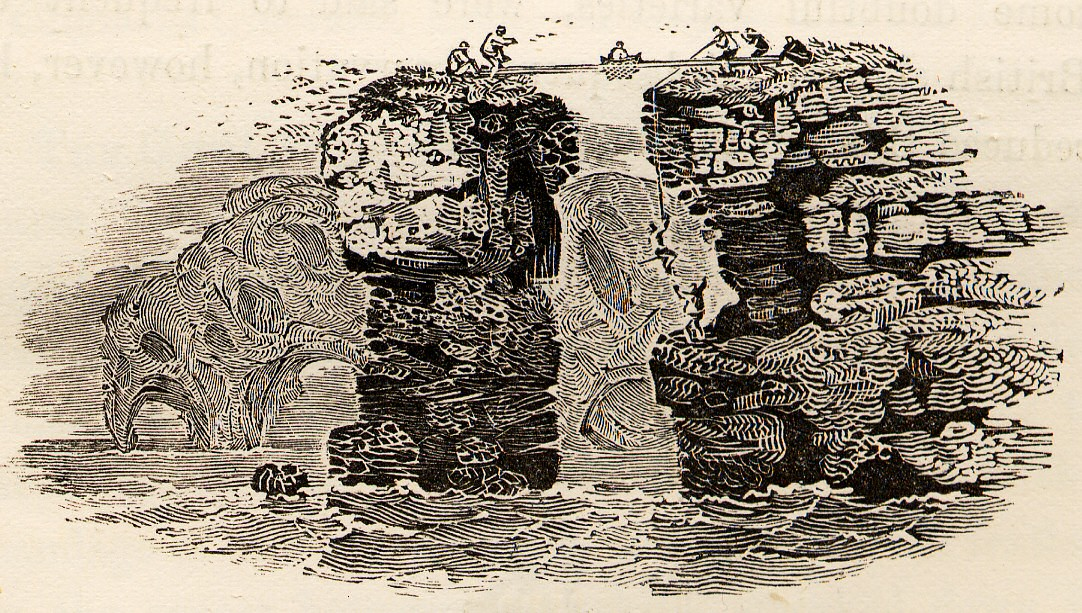
Collecting birds’ eggs from sea cliffs

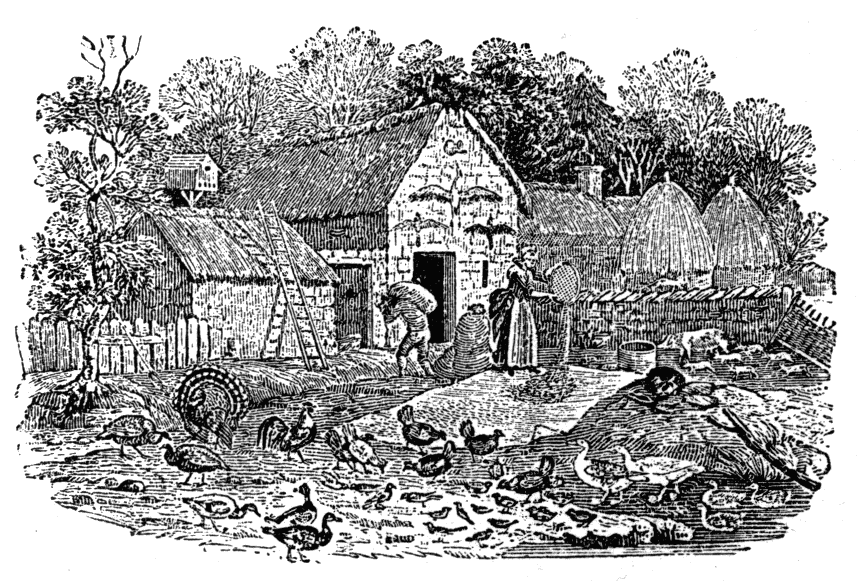
Farmyard

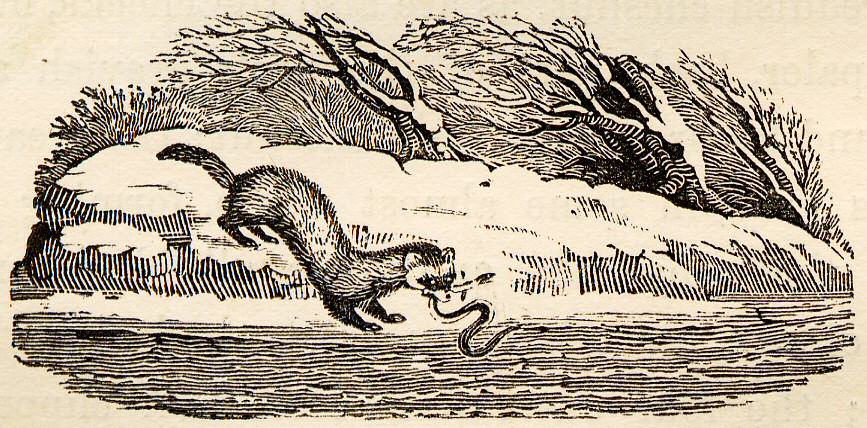
Polecat catching an eel in winter

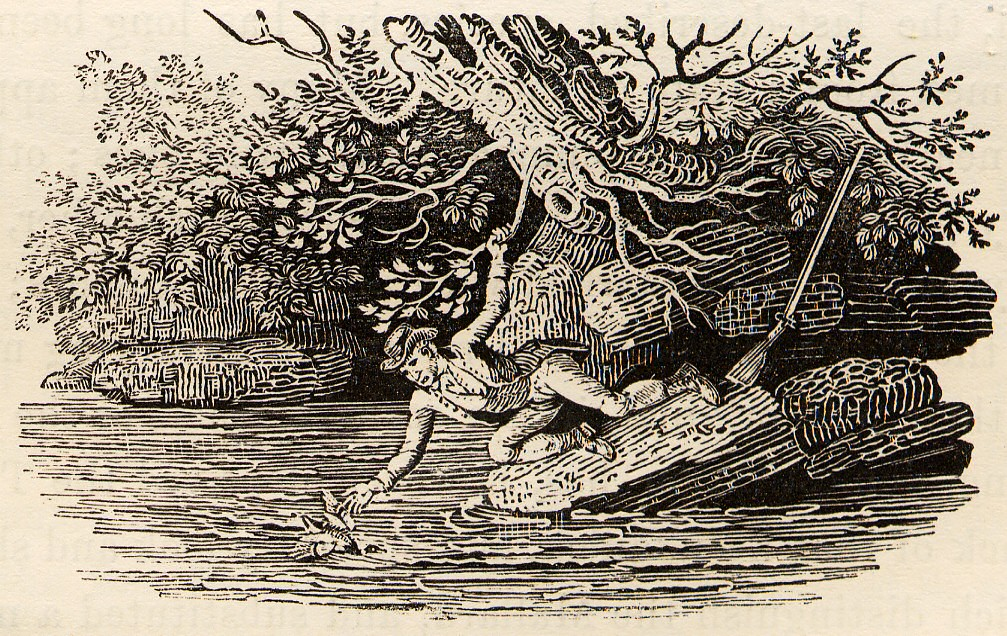
Hunter precariously retrieving duck from river

== Bibliography ==
- The 1784 edition of Fables of Aesop and others
- The 1818 edition of the fables; there is also an online fable by fable facsimile
- Bewick, Thomas (1790). A General History of Quadrupeds: The Figures Engraved on Wood. S. Hodgson, R. Beilby, T. Bewick, etc.
- Bewick, Thomas (1797–1804). A History of British Birds. Beilby and Bewick (Newcastle); G. G. & J. Robinson (London).
  Volume 1: Containing the History and Description of Land Birds
  Volume 2: Containing the History and Description of Water Birds
- Bewick, Thomas (1862). A Memoir of Thomas Bewick. Longman, Green, Longman, and Roberts.
  --- (1975). Iain Bain (editor). Oxford University Press.

== Sources ==
- Dixon, Hugh (2010). "Thomas Bewick and the North-Eastern Landscape". In Faulkner, Tom E.; Berry, Helen; Gregory, Jeremy (eds.). Northern Landscapes: Representations and Realities of North-East England. Boydell and Brewer. pp. 261–278. ISBN 9781843835417.
- Lee, Henry C.; Gaensslen, Robert E. (2010). Advances in Fingerprint Technology (2nd ed.). CRC Press.
- Rayner, John (1947). Wood Engravings by Thomas Bewick. King Penguin.
- Uglow, Jenny (2009) [2006]. Nature's Engraver: A Life of Thomas Bewick. University of Chicago Press.
- Tattersfield, Nigel (1999). Bookplates by Beilby & Bewick: A Biographical Dictionary of Bookplates from the Workshop of Ralph Beilby, Thomas Bewick & Robert Bewick, 1760–1849. British Library and Oak Knoll Press. ISBN 1-884718-91-4.
