= John Anderson (engraver) =

Scottish wood engraver (1775 – before 1809)

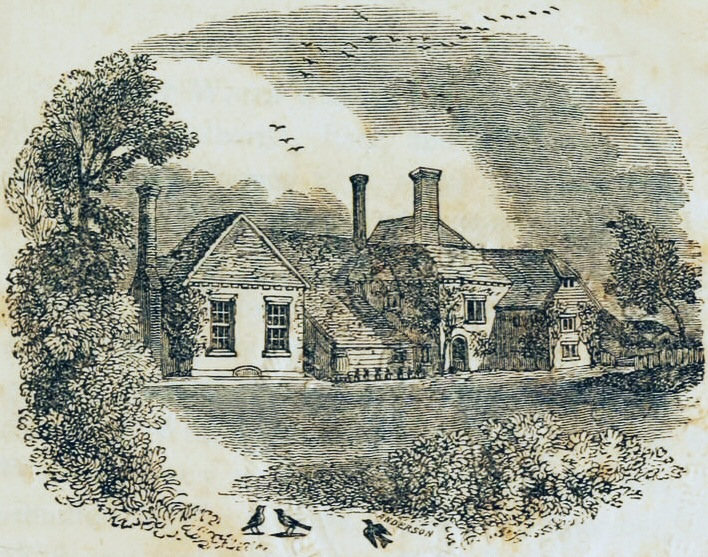
Engraving of The Wakes, Selborne, signed by John Anderson, on title page of The Natural History of Selborne by Gilbert White. Published by Harper and Brothers, New-York, 1841.

John Anderson (1775 – before 1809) was a Scottish wood engraver and illustrator, a pupil of the British wood engraver Thomas Bewick.

== Life ==
Anderson was born at Foveran in Scotland in 1775, the son of James Anderson of Hermiston. He was a pupil of Thomas Bewick, taken on at his father's wish to help with illustration of a periodical, The Bee. The relationship with Bewick ended acrimoniously, however, and by the later 1790s he was working for London printers. He went abroad by 1805, and died by 1808.

== Works ==
Anderson cut (after drawings by George Samuel) the blocks which illustrate Grove Hill, a 1799 poem by Thomas Maurice. It was sumptuously issued by Thomas Bensley in 1799, in a book that has been compared with William Somervile's The Chace. Anderson, with Shakespeare's Walk in the book, almost equals Bewick, according to Ernest Radford writing in the Dictionary of National Biography, and his treatment of foliage is reminiscent of the prints in Robert Bloomfield's Farmer's Boy, where the first edition of 1800 notes "with ornaments engraved by Anderson." These wood-engravings have been erroneously ascribed to Bewick.

Anderson also engraved illustrations to an edition of Junius. Redgrave says he formed "a style of his own and showed much ability".

Anderson engraved an 1841 edition of Gilbert White's Natural History of Selborne.

== Sources ==
- This article incorporates text from a publication now in the public domain: Stephen, Leslie, ed. (1885). "Anderson, John (fl.1799)". Dictionary of National Biography. Vol. 1. London: Smith, Elder & Co.
