= Jane Bewick =

- Born: 29 April 1787; Newcastle upon Tyne, England
- Died: 7 April 1881 (aged 93); Newcastle upon Tyne, England
- Occupation: English writer
- Parent(s): Thomas Bewick (father); Isabella (mother)
- Relatives: Robert Elliott Bewick (brother); Isabella Bewick (sister); Elizabeth Bewick (sister)

Jane Bewick (1787–1881) was the eldest daughter of Isabella and wood-engraver Thomas Bewick. She edited her father's biography and supervised his works. She and her sister Isabella Bewick agreed that the Bewick engravings, blocks and papers should be donated to institutions including the British Museum.

== Life ==
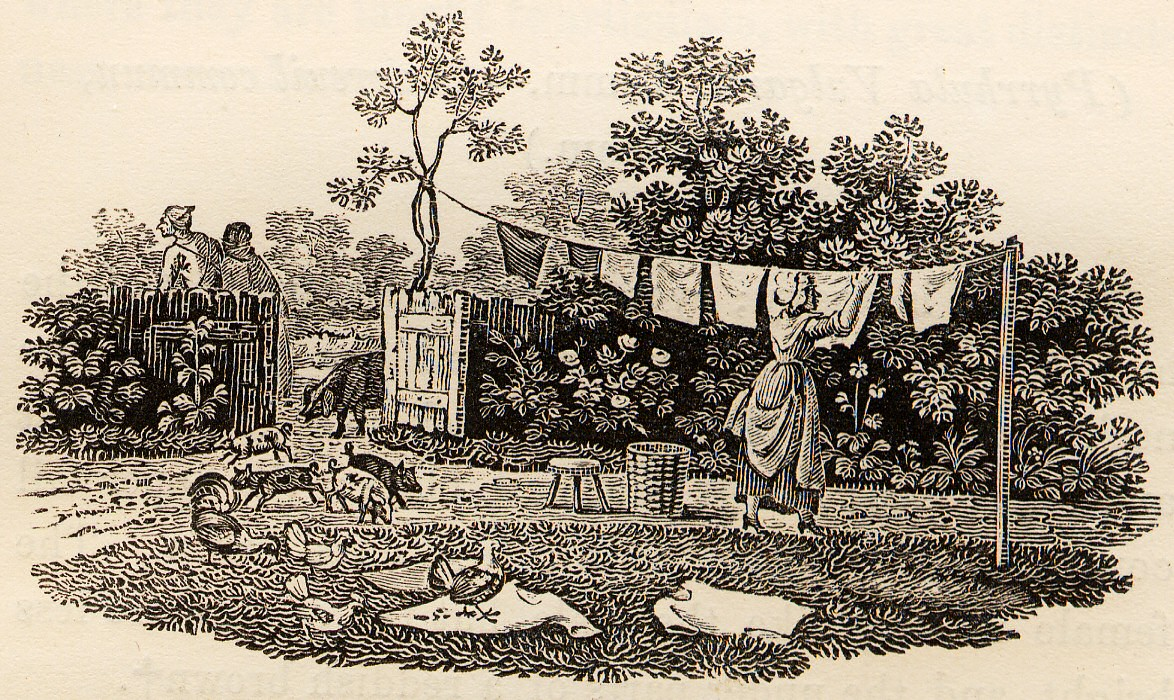
One of Thomas Bewick's wood engravings for his A History of British Birds.

Jane and her sister Isabella Bewick are known for their lifelong veneration for their father's memory, and a store of anecdotes about his work and ways.

In 1862 she edited and issued A Memoir of Thomas Bewick, written by Himself. Embellished by numerous wood engravings, designed and engraved by the author for a work on British Fishes, and never before published. This memoir, written by her father at Jane's request in 1822–8, was throughout the nineteenth century the standard authority for Bewick's personal history, providing a frank, manly, and characteristic piece of autobiography, but it barely mentions his innovative wood-engraving method and technique.

Jane's sister Isabella survived her until 1883, dying in the old Bewick family house, now 19 West Street, Gateshead, where her father and sister had died before her. In 1882 Isabella anticipated a bequest, agreed upon with her sister Jane, and gave the British Museum a substantial collection of water-colours and woodcuts by her father, his brother John, and his son Robert, some of which had been exhibited in London in November and December 1880. After her death her executors presented a collection of portraits, drawings, prints, and other Bewick relics to the Newcastle Natural History Society's Museum.
