= William Cant (musician) =

Early 19th-century Northumbrian piper and violinist

William Cant (1753–1821) was a Northumbrian piper and violinist in the early part of the 19th century.

== Biography ==
William Cant was born in Morpeth, Northumberland on 4 February 1753. He had studied the pipes with Old William Lamshaw, 'at an early age', according to the account of William Green (piper), his nephew, who was writing in the 1850s – Green's mother Isabel was Cant's sister. Thomas Bewick, the engraver, who knew him, confirms in his memoirs that Cant was Old Lamshaw's pupil. Green also stated that Cant had been postboy to Joseph Turnbull, and learned with him, when the latter was postmaster at Alnwick.

Green's account also tells us that Cant played the Northumberland pipes 'in the Regiment', 'in the American War'. He appears in the earliest surviving records of the 1st Northumberland Militia in 1780, as a drummer. This Militia regiment was posted to the south of England around this time, but does not seem to have been posted overseas. He seems to have left the army shortly after – the militia was stood down in 1782. In 1780, he married a Rebecca Anderson in Beverley, Yorkshire, and in 1791 he worked as a victualler in Hull. At some point between 1801 and 1812, he was again in the North-East, as landlord of The Blue Bell, an inn at the head of Side, in Newcastle. That street is the main road down from the city centre to the quayside, and to the (at that time only) bridge across the Tyne to Gateshead.

The Blue Bell seems to have been a significant piping venue, and was near the workshop of Thomas Bewick, who became a friend of Cant's. As Bewick was also a friend of John Peacock, it is very likely that Cant and Peacock knew each other well. When Cant died on 15 July 1821, Bewick wrote the following substantial obituary:

Died, Mr. William Cant, master of The Blue Bell, Head of the Side, aged 70, formerly piper to the Northumberland Militia. He was an excellent performer on the violin and Northumberland pipes; and like his great predecessors upon the latter instrument, Turnbull, Gilley, old Lamshaw and John Peacock, he kept up the ancient tunes, with all their charming lilts and pauses, unspoiled by the modern improvers of the music with their 'idiot notes impertinently long'. He played 'his native woodnotes wild', such as pleased the ears of the yeomanry of old at Otterburn, Hedgeley Moor and Flodden Field, and 'Whene'er his instrument did silence break, You'd thought the instrument would speak'.
