= Robert Nicholson (piper) =

English piper and fiddler (1798–1842)

Robert Nicholson (1798–1842) was a Northumbrian piper and fiddler. He was the nephew and pupil of William Green, who was piper to the Duke of Northumberland, and was later appointed as his assistant in this role.

He first played in public together with his uncle, for instance at a meeting of the Society for the Improvement of the English Marygold, in 1816. However, he was already performing alone at this time; a newspaper article states that the Duchess's Piper being prevented from playing there by illness, his young nephew Robert Nicholson, then 18, "just the age of the late famed Wm Lamshaw, when he bore away the prize at a musical match at Elsdon Court Baron", deputised for him, playing for the first time unassisted. It is clear from this that Green would normally have been expected to play at this event. Again, the following year, at a celebration of Earl Percy's wedding, in North Shields, Nicholson deputised for Green, who said he was unable to attend the event at short notice. It may well be that Green was deliberately excusing himself from these events, so that his nephew would get opportunities to perform in his own right. He played again in an official capacity that December, at a celebration of the birthday of Lord Prudhoe, in this account he is referred to as assisting "the Duchess's pipers", and called "the Percy piper", suggesting some measure of official recognition from the Duke. He played again for the Society for the Improvement of the English Marygold on various occasions until 1823, together with Green. An account of their playing for the Society in 1822, stated that "Fitzmaurice, Allen, Lamshaw, or Hair, never performed better"; it also refers to the "present improved form" of the pipes - in 1822 this would probably refer to the keyed instruments developed by Robert Reid. It also confirms that "the revival of northern music... constitutes one of the most prominent objects of the Society." In 1824, at the Tynemouth Fair in May, "many gentlemen dined at the Northumberland Arms, and were delighted with the ancient music of the Duchess of Northumberland's pipers" - these would have been Green and Nicholson. In William Green's obituary, particular mention is made of their innovative duet playing, with one playing the air, and the other playing the accompaniment. Previously, the instrument was primarily a solo instrument - harmonies would not have been feasible when the instrument's range was only a single octave, which was the case until the beginning of the 19th century.

Sources for his later life are much scarcer. He was a witness at William Green's marriage in Alnwick, in 1825. The Duchess's pipers, that is William Green and Robert Nicholson, played at Ovingham Fair in 1826. There seems to be no later dateable reference to him as a piper performing in public. Green was witness at Nicholson's marriage to Margaret Dodds, in St. Nicholas' Church, Newcastle, in 1831.

Nicholson died in Morpeth, on 11 October 1842, in the Black Swan, in King Street (now called Back Riggs), "unrivalled as a musician on the Northumberland small pipes, and was one of the Duchess of Northumberland's late pipers." In the 1851 census, Margaret Nicholson, a widow, is listed as innkeeper of the Black Swan. As all her children were born before 1842, the identification of her as Robert's widow is very likely. Two years after Nicholson's death, Thomas Chisholm was appointed as piper to the Duke of Northumberland for the Manor of Tynemouth, as his successor in the role. He performed at several local events in this capacity until 1848, but moved to Newcastle shortly after this.
