= William Green (piper) =

Northumbrian smallpipe player (1775–1860)

William Green (1775–1860) was a player of the Northumbrian smallpipes, and the Piper to the Duchess of Northumberland from 1806 until 1849. He was assisted in this role by his nephew Robert Nicholson (1798–1842), and his son William Thomas (Tom) Green (1823–1898). Tom then succeeded his father as Ducal Piper until 1892. Father, nephew and son thus held some of the most influential piping roles in the county for a period of almost ninety years.

== Early life ==
William was born in 1775 in Morpeth. An elder brother, also William, had been born in 1772, but died young. This seems to have led to some confusion about his birth date. His father Thomas was baptised at Rothbury, and his family came from Thropton nearby. This is the area where the Allan family of pipers lived, and it is likely they would have known each other. William's mother Isabel was the elder sister of William Cant, also a famous early piper.

Sources for William's early career are fragmentary, and there is little surviving record of any military service. However, his obituary, as well as later accounts, do refer to him having served; there is a record of a William Green in the Northumberland Militia in the 1790s, but it is not certain that this refers to the piper. There is also a record of him serving very briefly in a Volunteer Company in Morpeth from 1799-1800.

He may perhaps be the William Green who married in Tynemouth in 1818, then giving his profession as 'master mariner'; certainly his son William Thomas was born there in 1823. However, after 1806, Green would have had regular duties several times a year in different parts of the county in his role as Piper to the Duchess, which would surely have been incompatible with sea voyages. These duties included regular appearances at Tynemouth, for instance at the proclamation of Tynemouth and North Shields hiring fair. In 1816, a newspaper article states that the Duchess's Piper being prevented from playing there by illness, his young nephew Robert Nicholson, then 18, "just the age of the late famed Wm Lamshaw, when he bore away the prize at a musical match at Elsdon Court Baron", deputised for him. It is clear from this that Green would normally have been expected to play at this event. Again, the following year, at a celebration of Earl Percy's wedding, in North Shields, Nicholson deputised for Green.

If William Green the piper was indeed still living in Tynemouth, he would have been living near Robert Reid, the pipemaker and piper, who lived and worked in North Shields. In any case, he would have had regular opportunities to visit Reid. There is no definite evidence for Green living elsewhere before his move to Morpeth, where he first appears in the 1841 census, as landlord of The Seven Stars. In 1834, the landlord of that inn was still Robert Richardson, so Green must have taken over the business subsequent to this date.

== Ducal Piper ==
The earliest record of him as a piper is of him being appointed Piper to the Duchess in 1806, on the death of Young William Lamshaw.. A photograph of him, with his pipes, and wearing the crescent badge of the Percys, was taken later in his life, and is at .

He was succeeded as Ducal Piper by his son William Thomas (Tom) Green, on his retirement in 1849. A photograph of Tom is available at .

Over a period of decades, from 1822 until 1857, there survive newspaper accounts of William Green and Robert Nicholson playing together, for instance at a meeting of the Society for the Improvement of the English Marygold, in 1816. Nicholson died in Morpeth, on 11 October 1842, "unrivalled as a musician on the Northumberland small pipes, and was one of the Duchess of Northumberland's late pipers" and there are subsequent accounts of William and Tom Green, playing together; these include a Burns Supper in North Shields, the Duke's manorial court in Newburn, and the launch of a ship in West Hartlepool.

== Musician and Innkeeper ==
At some point before the census of 1841, but apparently after 1834, he became an innkeeper; in 1841 he was living at, and running, The Seven Stars in Morpeth, and in 1834 that business was still run by Robert Richardson. As many inns were run by musicians, such as Thomas Hair running The Blue Bell in nearby Bedlington, or Green's uncle William Cant running The Blue Bell at the head of Side in Newcastle, this may have been a natural change of career.

== Death ==
On his death in 1860, he was given an extended obituary in The Alnwick Mercury. This confirms that he had been a well-known figure throughout the county for fifty years. He was a tall man, more than six feet in height, and 'with a muscular development that entitled him to be classed among the forms gigantic', he cut an imposing figure. Despite his massive build, he was something of an athlete: 'and this welterweight could have been backed to any amount to run one hundred yards against any individual in the county'. The obituary states that he assisted in extending the compass of the Northumbrian smallpipes, until it was in some degree a new instrument. The two pipemakers most involved in this redesign were first John Dunn, and later Robert Reid; it would have made sense for Reid to work closely with an expert piper like Green, as Dunn had done earlier with John Peacock. It also states that he originated the 'new arrangement' of duet playing, so that with the aid of his nephew Robert Nicholson, or of his own son Tom, he achieved results of which the older instrument, with a single-octave compass, had been incapable. That these pipers were able to play well in tune with each other shows that at least one of them had considerable skill in making and adjusting reeds.

He seems to have been a convivial host in The Seven Stars, possessing 'a rich fund of anecdote'. This source confirms he had been running the inn for 'some twenty years', suggesting he had not been there long before the census of 1841. The article considered that he was at least the equal of pipers of previous generations, Turnbull, Gilley, Lamshaw and Peacock. Turnbull had been, according to Green, the first piper to the Earl of Northumberland, and after the creation of the dukedom, to the Duke of Northumberland; he was succeeded by Old William Lamshaw and then his grandson Young William Lamshaw. John Peacock is believed to have been the first piper to play on a keyed chanter, with a range of more than one octave. Of Gilley, however, there is little surviving record; now only his name is remembered.

== The Ancient Melodies Committee ==
In 1857 he had performed at Alnwick Castle, together with his son Tom and with James Reid, to provide musical illustrations for a report of the Ancient Melodies Committee of the Society of Antiquaries of Newcastle upon Tyne to the Duke. He was one of the Committee's main informants on the music and history of Northumbrian pipes and the Ducal pipers. A note in the minutes (17 November 1857) of this Committee quotes Green, as saying that Peacock was the best player he ever heard in his life, whereas "Jamie Allan was a wild player, he was neither first, second nor third." Green also reported that his uncle William Cant had been postboy to Joseph Turnbull, the postmaster at Alnwick as well as an innkeeper and the first Ducal Piper, and that Cant had learned the instrument from him. Green also stated that Peacock had studied first with Old William Lamshaw, and later with Turnbull. As Turnbull died in 1775, when Peacock was only 19, Green's account, 75 years later, and at second hand presumably via Peacock, may have been at fault here.

Green was thus, besides his reputation as a piper, a link between the piping tradition of the 18th century, and the antiquarians who sought to keep the tradition alive in the mid-19th. Their work eventually led to the publication of The Northumbrian Minstrelsy, a substantial part of which concerned Northumbrian pipe music.
