= Robert Bewick =

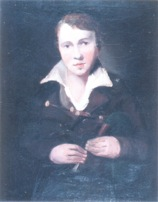
Portrait of Robert Bewick, by John Bell

Robert Elliot Bewick (1788–1849) was the son of the engraver Thomas Bewick. He was trained in engraving by his father, but is primarily remembered now as a player of the Northumbrian smallpipes.

== Background ==
Thomas Bewick had wished to encourage the Northumbrian smallpipes, and to support the piper John Peacock; in his autobiographical Memoir, written in the 1820s, he wrote Some time before the American War broke out, there had been a lack of musical performers upon our streets, and in this interval, I used to engage John Peacock, our inimitable performer, to play on the Northumberland or Small-pipes; and with his old tunes, his lilts, his pauses, and his variations, I was always excessively pleased. William Green, piper to the Duke of Northumberland, considered Peacock to be the best small pipes player he ever heard in his life. He was probably the first player of the instrument to play an extended keyed chanter. Such chanters were developed in the first decades of the 19th century, by John Dunn, in association with Peacock, and by Robert Reid. Thomas Bewick encouraged Peacock to teach pupils to become masters of this kind of music; from records in Thomas's cashbooks, noting payments to Peacock for lessons, we know that one of these pupils was Thomas's own son, Robert. Beside some of the entries for these payments, Thomas made sketches of Robert piping.

== His work ==
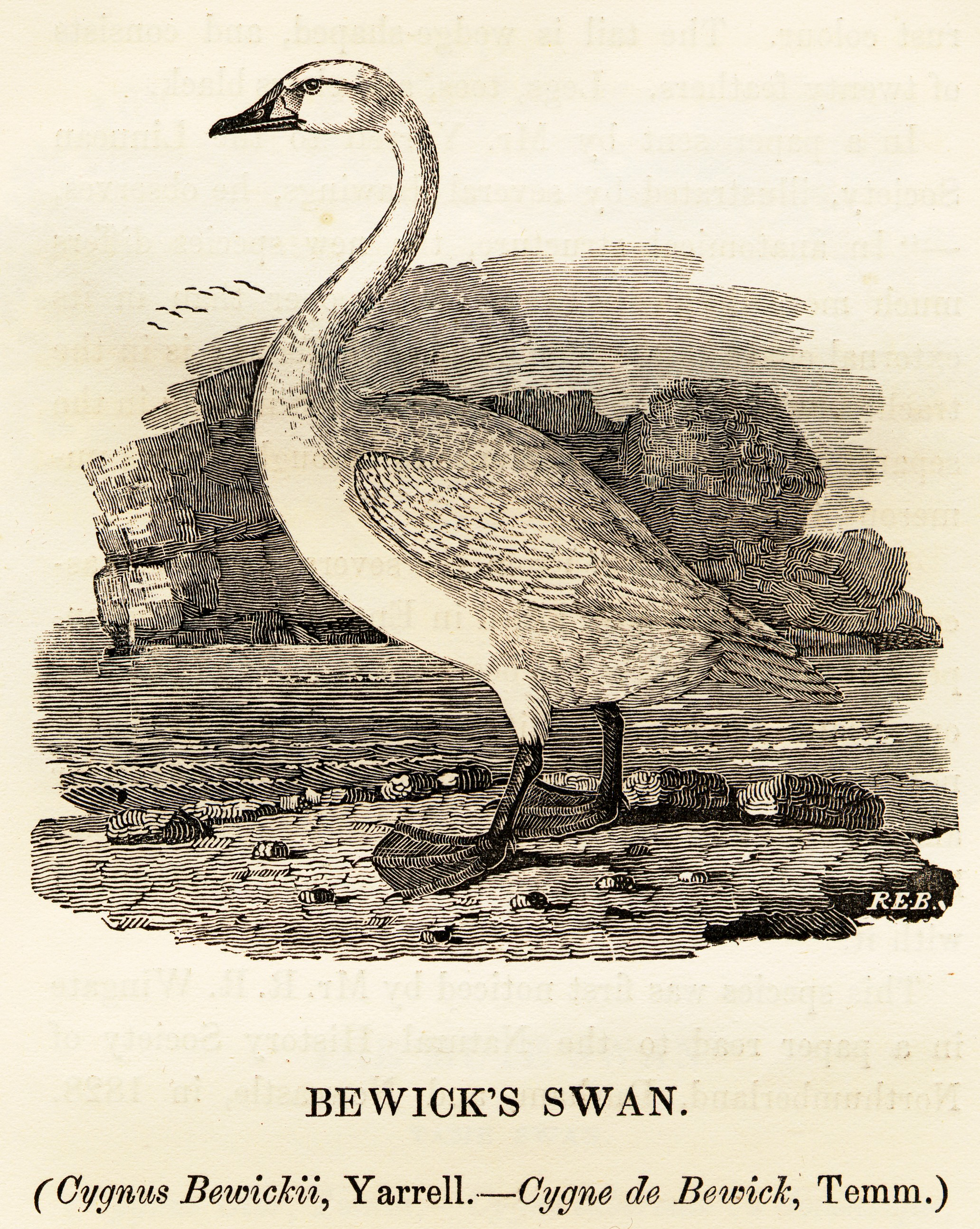
Woodcut by Robert Elliot Bewick of Bewick's swan, named after his father by William Yarrell.

Robert was himself trained as an engraver, being at first apprenticed and later a partner in his father's workshop; after his father's death he inherited and continued the business. Some engravings by him are shown on the Bewick Society's website.

A major project which Robert began with his father, to conclude Thomas's series of natural histories, was a 'History of British Fishes'. Although this was never completed, drawings for this, and many others on various subjects, are in the British Museum:

== His music ==
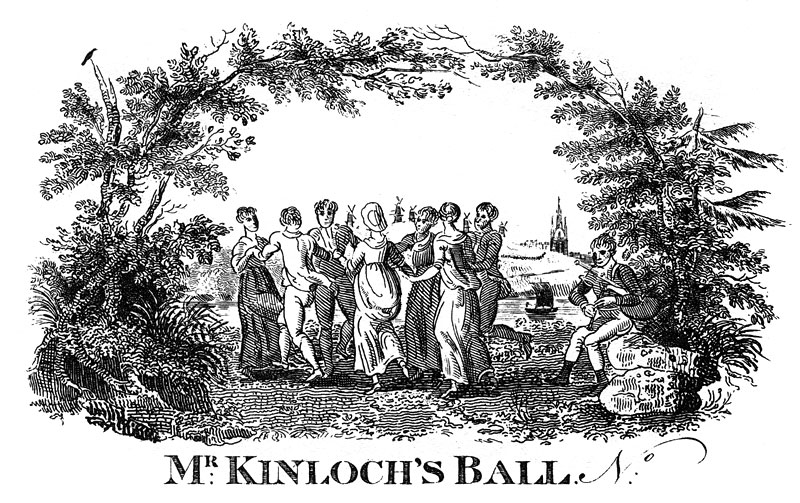
This ball ticket was engraved by Robert Bewick, from a drawing by his father. The seated piper is Robert himself.

Although, as a boy, Robert had learned the Northumbrian smallpipes from arguably the best piper of his age, there is no evidence he was himself a virtuoso performer. There are however surviving accounts of his playing, and it is clear that this was much appreciated. To Northumbrian pipers nowadays, his importance nowadays lies more in the 5 manuscript books of Northumbrian smallpipe tunes he left. Three of these, signed by him, and dated between 1832 and 1843, give a very detailed picture of the broad repertoire of a Northumbrian piper at this early stage in the instrument's development, only a few decades after the earliest keyed chanters appeared. As well as some tunes apparently copied from Peacock's tunebook, there are some in a similar style with a one octave range, and are an important and somewhat later development from this body of surviving 18th century pipe tunes. Some tunes seem to be adaptations of Border pipe tunes, with a 9-note range and a flat 7th. Others are transcriptions of fiddle tunes, many of them Scottish, with a range typically from D to b, exploiting the extended range of the novel keyed chanter. As some of the tunes are in E minor, needing a d sharp key, it is clear that this key must have been added to some chanters before the books were written down. The repertoire in the books was significantly wider than just Northumbrian and Scottish traditional music, including contemporary ballroom music as well as classical pieces, such as a Duett by Mozart, which is an arrangement of Das klinget so herrlich from The Magic Flute.

After Robert's death, his sisters gave his pipes and tunebooks to the artist and tune collector Joseph Crawhall, who did much to encourage the Northumbrian smallpipes. Subsequently these books were given to Gateshead Public Library, where they remain. Robert's pipes,

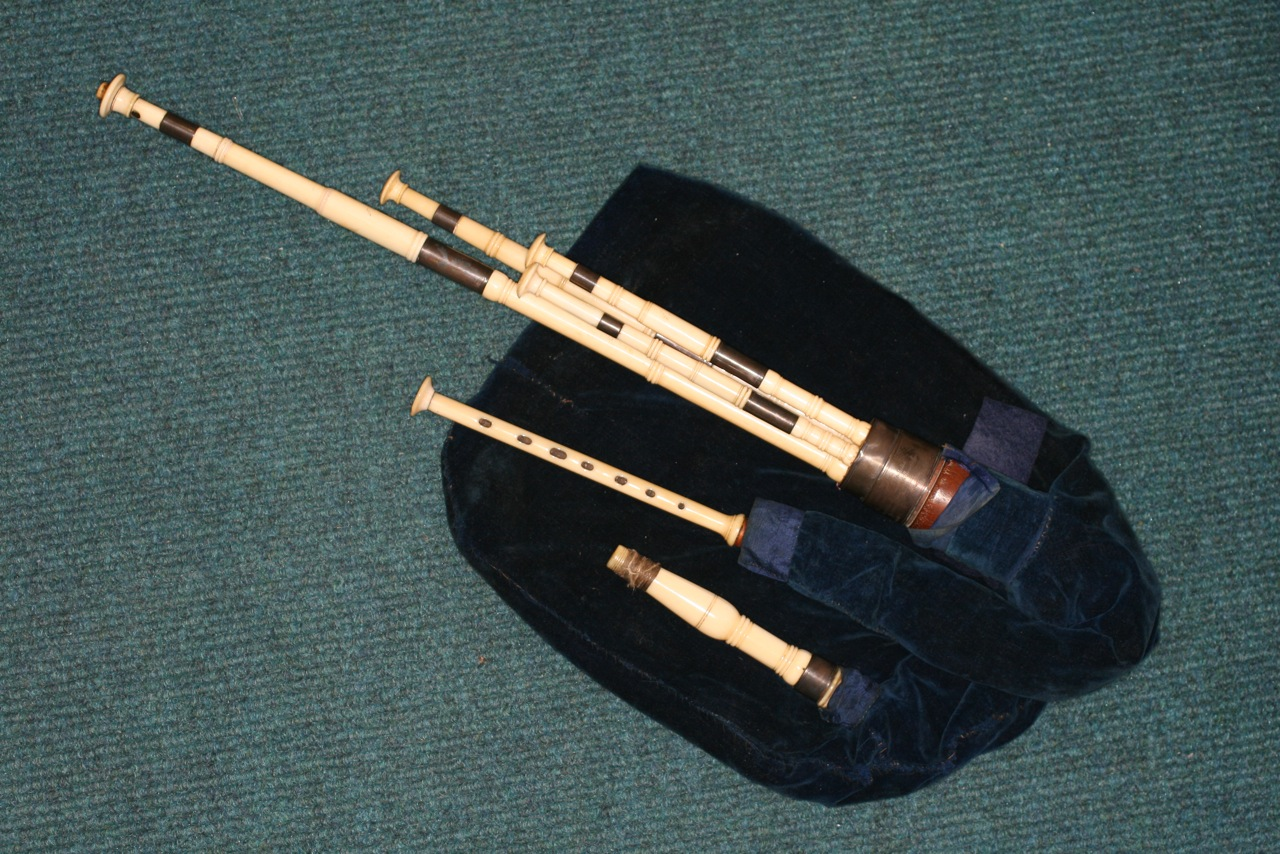
These Northumbrian smallpipes were made by John Dunn, and belonged to Robert Bewick. They have an inscription on the dronestock ferrule stating their provenance. It is likely that this simple chanter is not the original, which was probably keyed.

a fine set by John Dunn, are now in the Morpeth Chantry Bagpipe Museum.

Matt Seattle published a small edition of some of the Bewick tunes in 1987, and a much expanded edition of this came out, with detailed notes, in 1998. In 2010 this was reissued in a new edition by the Northumbrian Pipers' Society, with the addition of a revised version of Iain Bain's 1982 essay on Thomas and Robert Bewick and their connections with Northumbrian piping.
