= John Peacock (piper) =

British musician

John Peacock (c. 1756 in Morpeth – 1817 in Newcastle) was one of the finest Northumbrian smallpipers of his age, and probably a fiddler also, and the last of the Newcastle Waits. He studied the smallpipes with Old William Lamshaw, of Morpeth, and later with Joseph Turnbull, of Alnwick.

His playing was highly regarded in his lifetime: Thomas Bewick, the engraver, who also lived and worked in Newcastle, wrote Some time before the American War broke out, there had been a lack of musical performers upon our streets, and in this interval, I used to engage John Peacock, our inimitable performer, to play on the Northumberland or Small-pipes; and with his old tunes, his lilts, his pauses, and his variations, I was always excessively pleased. William Green, piper to the Duke of Northumberland from 1806, considered him the best small pipes player he ever heard in his life.

He is also closely associated with the first printed collection of music for smallpipes, A Favorite Collection of Tunes with Variations Adapted for the Northumberland Small Pipes, Violin, or Flute, published by William Wright, of Newcastle, probably in 1801. The book had an engraved title page in the style of Thomas Bewick, and probably from his workshop, and the 1801 date is suggested by entries in the account books of Bewick for work done for Wright, between February and June 1801; in any case, Wright gave the address of his shop as High Bridge, so the date of publication definitely preceded the move of the business from High Bridge to Pilgrim Street, which he announced in April and May 1803.

As well as containing 50 tunes for smallpipes, the book also contains an engraving, also thought to have been done in Bewick's workshop, showing 2 chanters and their fingering charts; one is a simple keyless chanter with an octave range from G to g, the other is J. Peacock's New Invented Pipe Chanter with the addition of Four Keys. These keys were for the notes low D, E, F sharp, and high a.

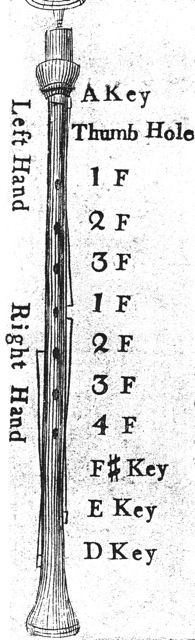
Peacock's keyed chanter

Peacock was thus probably the first player of the instrument to play an extended keyed chanter. Such chanters continued to be developed in the first decades of the 19th century, by John Dunn, in association with Peacock, and slightly later by Robert Reid, and subsequently by others, including Reid's son James.

Thomas Bewick encouraged Peacock to teach pupils to become masters of this kind of music; one of these pupils was Bewick's own son, Robert Eliot Bewick.

== Peacock's Tunes ==
This, the first published book of music for Northumbrian smallpipes, contains much of the most characteristic music of the instrument, variation sets with a single-octave range. It is the main source for this body of music. Some of these tunes may be compared with earlier versions from the William Dixon manuscript, from more than 60 years earlier. Some of these are very similar - Cut and Dry Dolly is an elaboration on Dixon's Cut and Dry Dolly the new way, while I saw my Love come passing by me is also very similar to its precursor in Dixon. A pair which can be compared closely are Peacock's Wylam Away, and Dixon's Gingling Geordie; apart from inessential differences in key and note length, most strains in the one have close parallels with some strain in the other. However the strains occur in a different order, and melodic figures may be swapped in order between the two versions of a given strain. Evidently these versions were current over the intervening 60–70 years. Other Peacock variation sets are less closely related to the Dixon versions; in particular My Hinny sits ower late up is much shorter than, and rather different from, Dixon's Adam a Bell.

Some of the Peacock variation sets such as Cuckold come out of the Amrey, based on the Scottish tune Struan Robertson's Rant, are not known from any earlier source. The collection also contains adaptations of other music, particularly some Scottish fiddle music, to smallpipes. Some of these pieces, like My Ain Kind Dearie, need the keyed chanter with its extended range; this tune in particular is notable for the detailed notation of the variation and the ornaments. This may give some idea of what Bewick meant by 'his lilts, his pauses and his variations'. Some tunes in the collection, such as The Black and the Grey, are adaptations to a single-octave chanter of Border Pipe tunes with a nine note range; necessarily something of the original was lost, and this adaptation in particular is less successful, however some others, such as Over the Border, work very well in Peacock's version.

The whole collection, with some notes on the tunes, may be viewed online on the FARNE archive, or at http://www.cl.cam.ac.uk/~rja14/musicfiles/manuscripts/peacock.pdf. The music was republished by the Northumbrian Pipers' Society in 1999.

The manuscript tunebooks of Peacock's pupil, Robert Bewick, contain some twenty single octave variation sets not found in the Peacock collection; it is possible that they too formed part of Peacock's repertoire, or were developed from versions of Peacock's, being stylistically very similar to those in 'A Favorite Collection'.

== Peacock's pipes ==
A set of pipes with a single-octave chanter was presented by John Dunn (bagpipe maker) to John Peacock in 1797; this set now lacks the original chanter, but still carries the original engraved ferrule on the drone-stock reading: 'The Gift of John Dunn to John Peacock Newcastle 1797'.

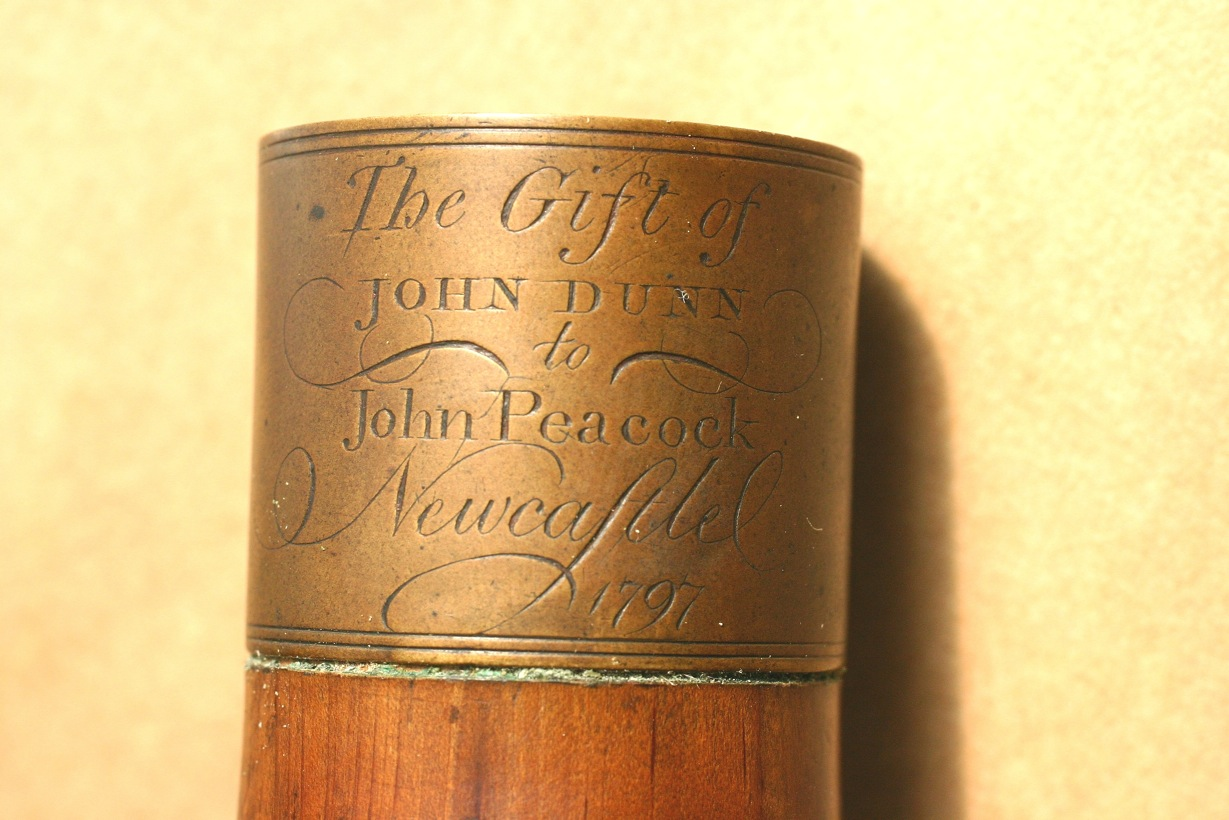
The engraved drone-ferrule on Peacock's pipes.

The engraved inscription is generally thought to have been done in the workshop of Thomas Bewick. The set was acquired by the Society of Antiquaries of Newcastle upon Tyne in 2004, and is now in the Morpeth Chantry Bagpipe Museum. An article published in 1894 states that these pipes were in the possession of John Stokoe, and had at this time a seven-keyed chanter. As the earliest keyed chanters had four keys, as shown in Peacock's tunebook, the chanter Stokoe saw, which he believed to be by Robert Reid, was not the original either.
