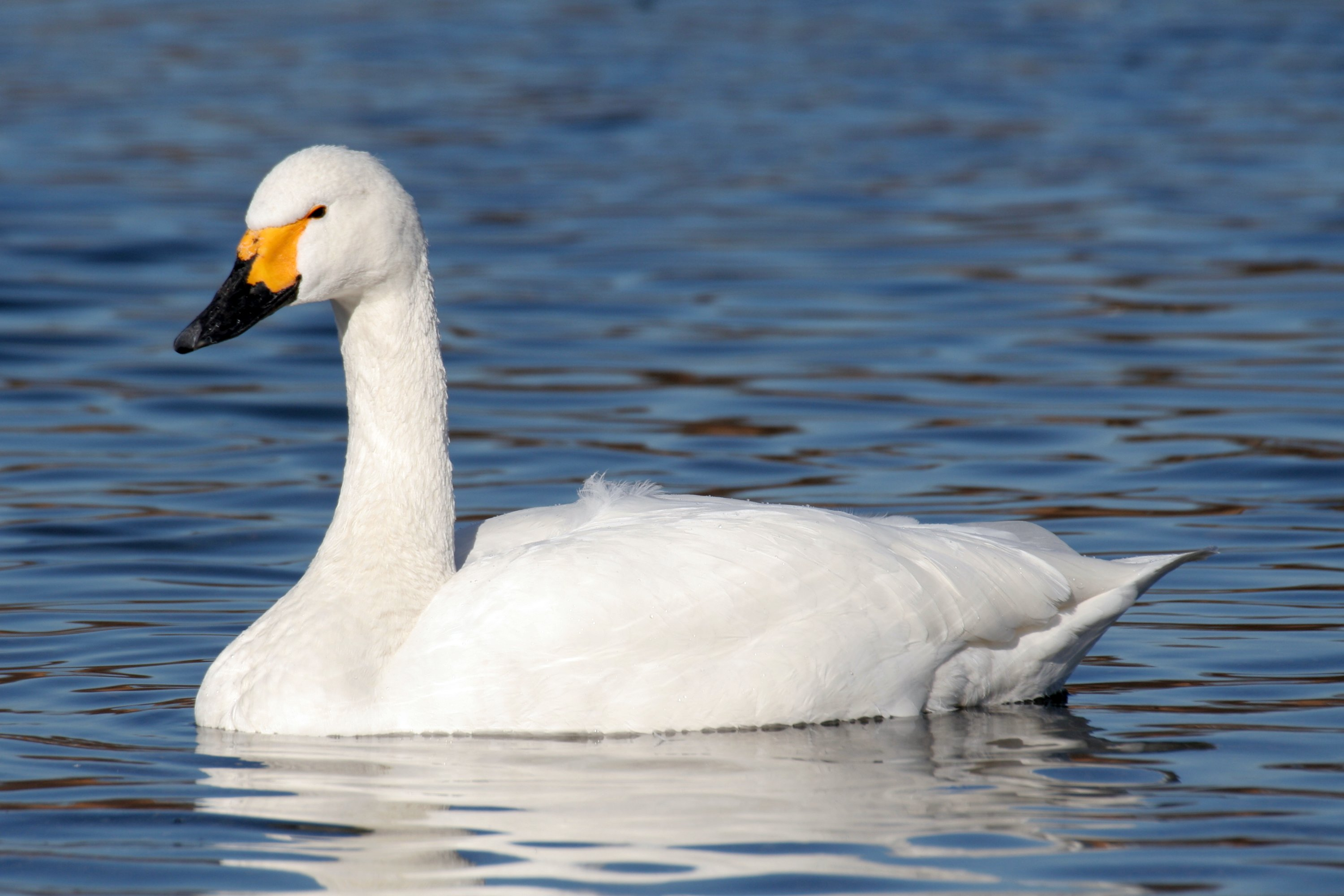
- Bewick's swan (C. c. bewickii)

Conservation status
- Least Concern (IUCN 3.1)

Scientific classification
- Kingdom: Animalia
- Phylum: Chordata
- Class: Aves
- Order: Anseriformes
- Family: Anatidae
- Genus: Cygnus
- Species: C. columbianus

Binomial name
- Cygnus columbianus (Ord, 1815)

Subspecies
- C. c. bewickii (Yarrell, 1830), Bewick's swan C. c. columbianus (Ord, 1815), whistling swan
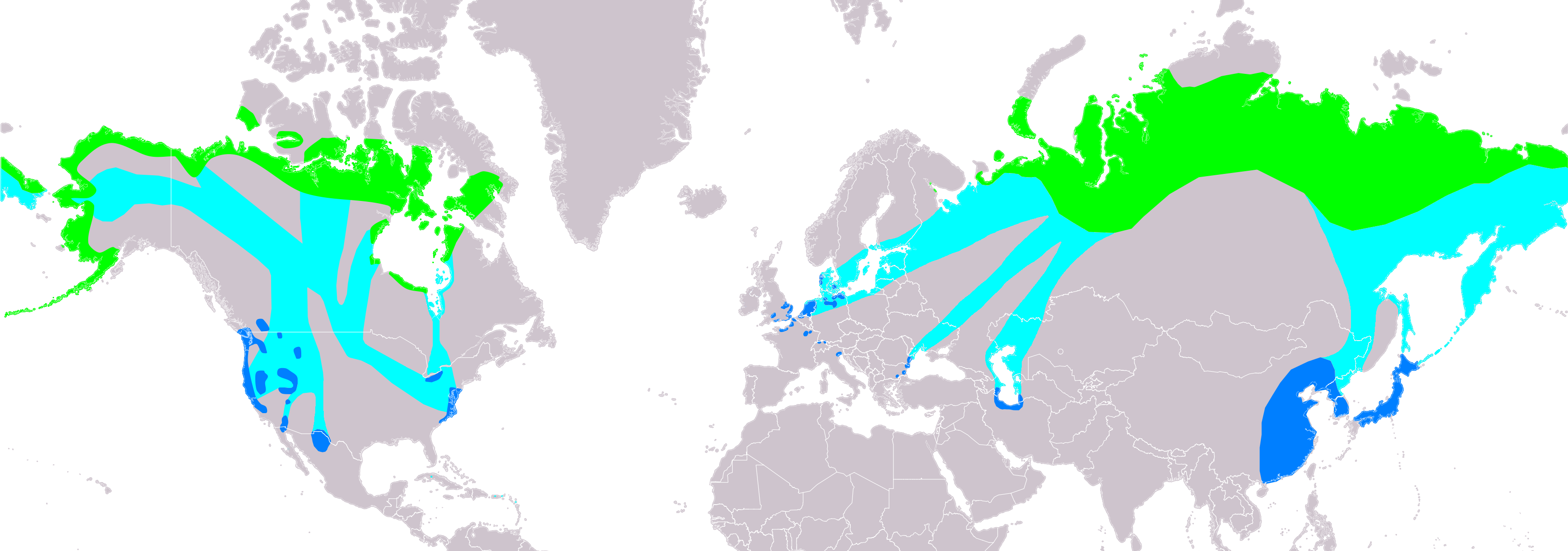

Synonyms
- Anas columbianus Ord, 1815; Anas spec Ord, 1815; Cygnus colombianus (Ord, 1815); Cygnus minor Yarrell; Olor columbianus (Ord, 1815)

Audio
- Call of C. c. bewickii, in Gloucestershire, England

= Tundra swan =

Tundra swan (Bewick's swan/whistling swan) Temporal range: Zanclean–Present (Note: Fossil remains are known from between 5.33 and 3.60 million years ago.)

Species of bird

The tundra swan (Cygnus columbianus) is a species of swan which breeds in the arctic, and overwinters in North America, Europe, and Asia. It is the smallest of the Holarctic swans, at 115–150 cm (45–59 in) in length, 168–211 cm (66–83 in) in wingspan and 3.4–9.6 kg (7.5–21.2 lb) in weight. Typically, the plumage of adults is entirely white, with solid black feet, a black beak that has varying amounts of yellow, and a thin streak of pink along the mouthline, although colour variation is common.

In the summer, they mainly eat aquatic vegetation, while at other times of year they often eat leftover crops, such as potatoes. They have few natural predators, although sometimes Arctic foxes, parasitic jaegers, and glaucous gulls will prey upon their eggs and chicks. Their main cause of death is poaching. During the breeding season, tundra swans become aggressive, and may attack passing animals and other tundra swans; outside of the breeding season, they can form groups. They make a high-pitched honk, similar to a black goose.

Tundra swans live for an average of 10 years in the wild. They mate in spring, and are monogamous, mating for life. In May, they build a nest beside water using plant material, and lay 2–7 eggs, which incubate for about 30 days. The young fledge quickly after 60–75 days, twice as fast as the young of mute swans. They remain with their parents for their first winter migration. Sometimes, in their winter grounds, the families are joined offspring from previous breeding seasons.

== Taxonomy ==
C. columbianaus contains 2 subspecies, which are also sometimes considered their own species: Bewick's swan (Cygnus bewickii) of the Palaearctic and the whistling swan (C. columbianus) proper of the Nearctic. Birds from eastern Russia (roughly east of the Taymyr Peninsula) were sometimes separated as the subspecies C. c. jankowskii, but this is not widely accepted as distinct, with most authors including it in C. c. bewickii.

=== Etymology ===
Bewick's swan was named in 1830 by William Yarrell after the engraver Thomas Bewick, who specialised in illustrations of birds and animals. Cygnus is the Latin for "swan", and columbianus comes from the Columbia River, the type locality.

== Description ==
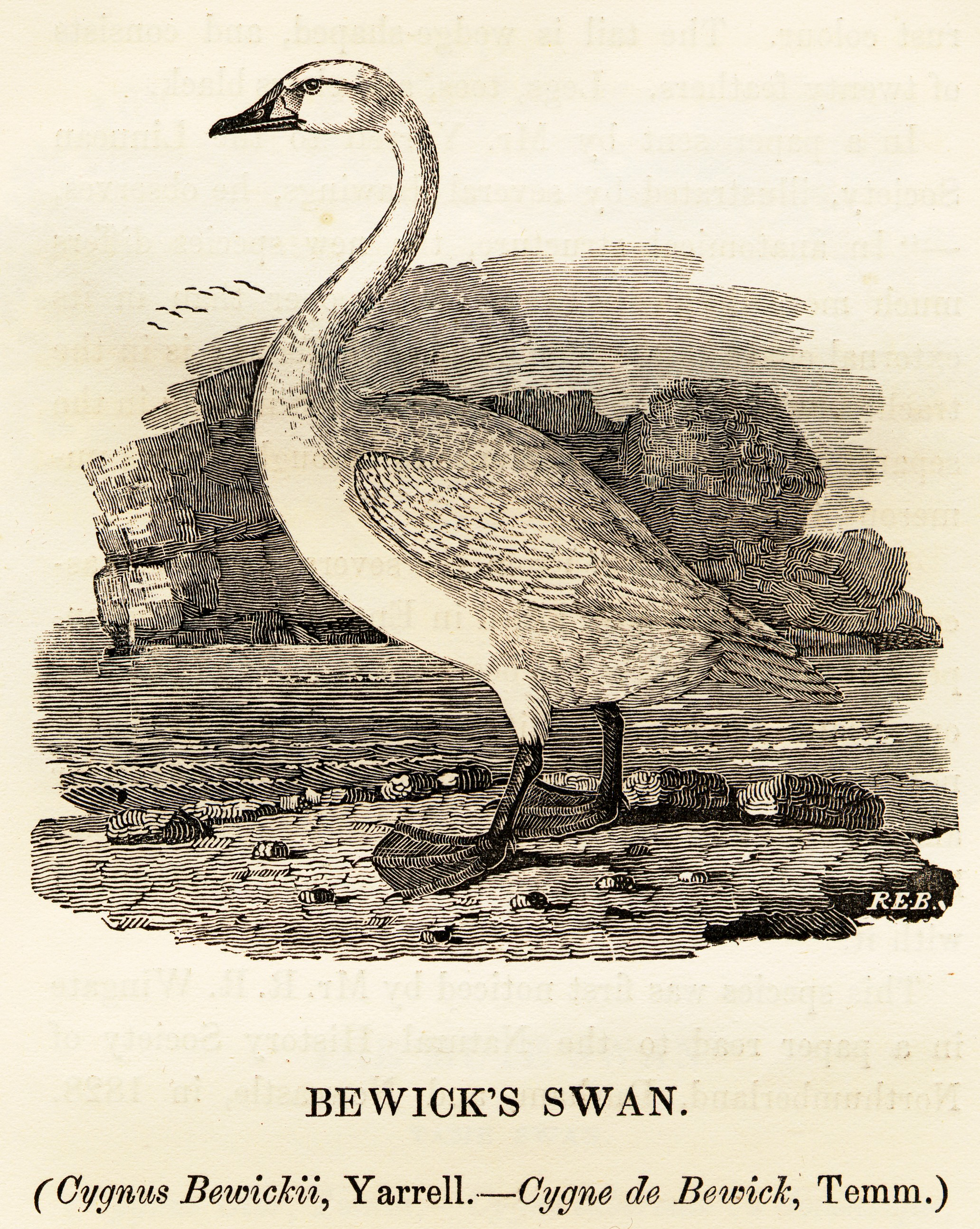
Woodcut by Robert Elliot Bewick of the swan named in memory of his father by William Yarrell. 1847 edition of Thomas Bewick's A History of British Birds.

C. columbianus is the smallest of the Holarctic swans, at 115–150 cm (45–59 in) in length, 168–211 cm (66–83 in) in wingspan and a weight range of 3.4–9.6 kg (7.5–21.2 lb). In adult birds, the plumage of both subspecies is entirely white, with black feet, and a bill that is mostly black, with a thin salmon-pink streak running along the mouthline and – depending on the subspecies – more or less yellow in the proximal part. The iris is dark brown. In birds living in waters that contains large amounts of iron ions (e.g. bog lakes), the head and neck plumage acquires a golden or rusty hue. Pens (females) are slightly smaller than cobs (males), but do not differ in appearance otherwise.

Immatures of both subspecies are white mixed with some dull grey feathering, mainly on the head and upper neck, which are often entirely light grey; their first-summer plumage is quite white already, and in their second winter they moult into the adult plumage. Their bills are black with a large dirty-pink patch taking up most of the proximal half and often black nostrils, and their feet are dark grey with a pinkish hue. Downy young are silvery grey above and white below.

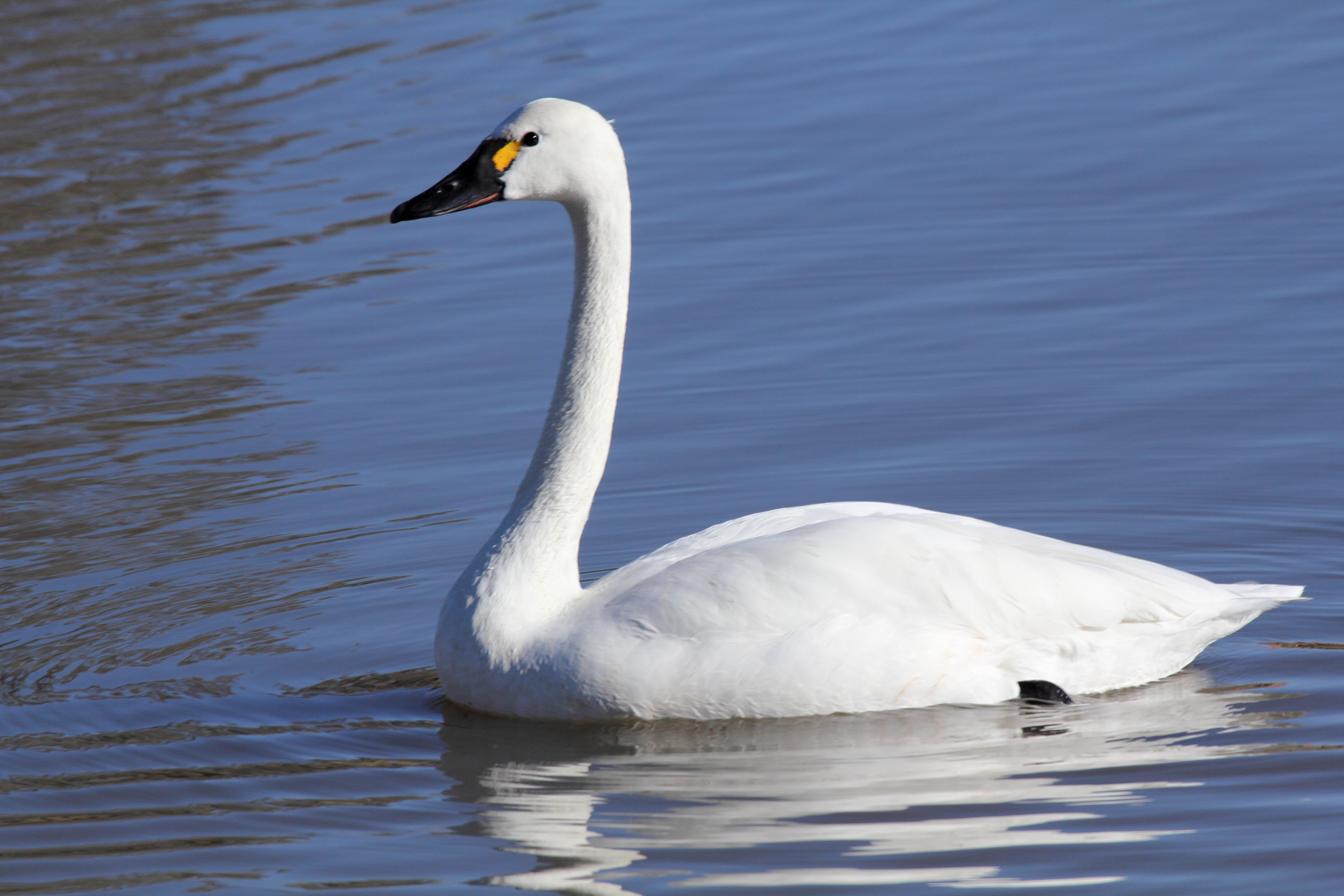
Whistling swan (C. c. columbianus)

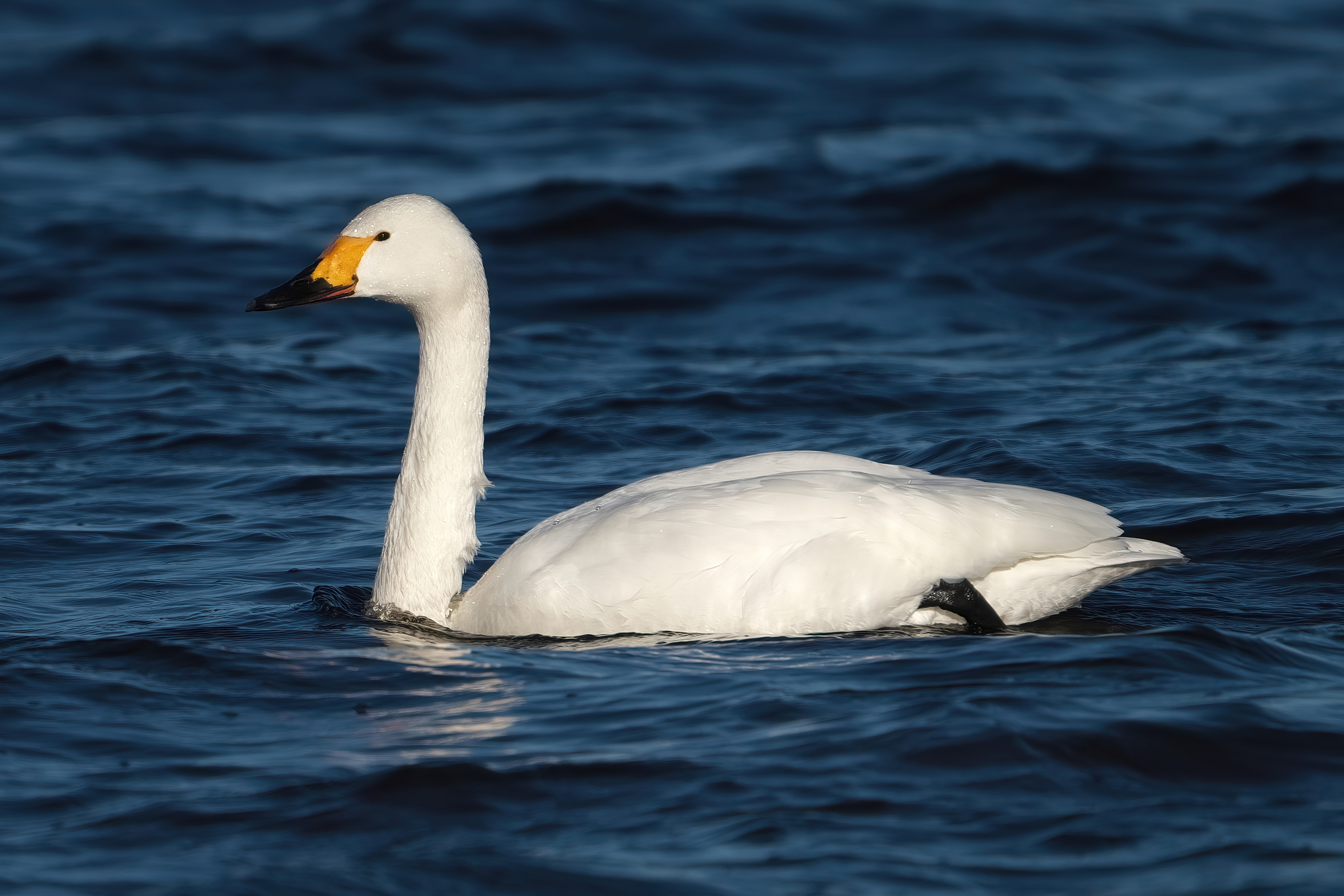
Bewick's swan (C. c. bewickii)

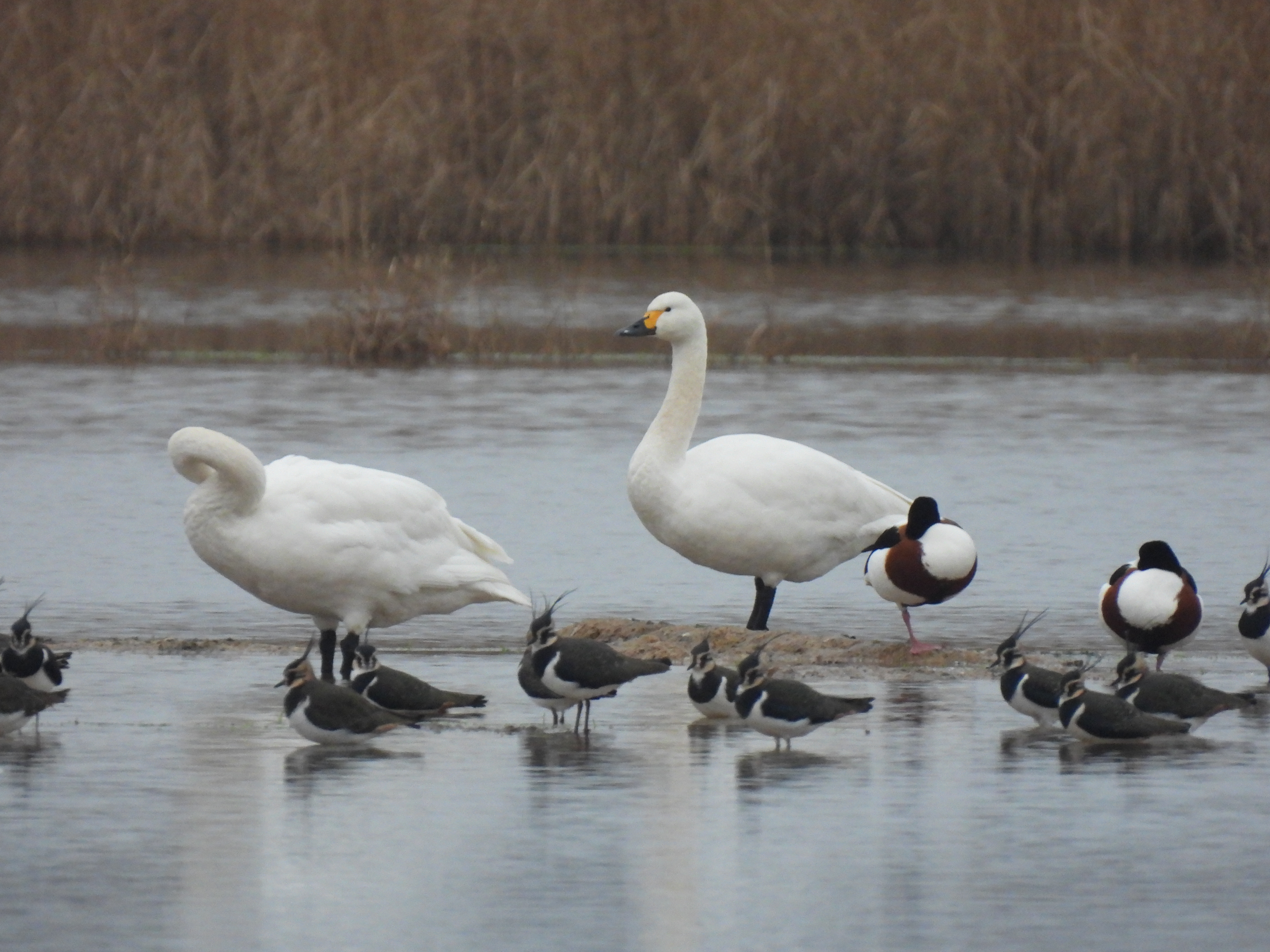
Bewick's swan (C. c. bewickii) with northern lapwing and common shelduck, at Hickling Broad, Stalham, Norfolk UK

Bewick's swans are the smaller subspecies. There is a slight size cline, with the eastern birds being slightly larger; good measurement data only exists for the western populations however. These weigh 3.4–7.8 kg (7.5–17.2 lb), 6.4 kg (14 lb) on average in males and 5.7 kg (13 lb) in females. They measure 115–140 cm (45–55 in) in overall length; each wing is 46.9–54.8 cm (18.5–21.6 in) long, on average 51.9 cm (20.4 in) in males and 50.4 cm (19.8 in) in females. The tarsus measures 9.2–11.6 cm (3.6–4.6 in) in length, the bill 8.2–10.2 cm (3.2–4.0 in), averaging 9.1 cm (3.6 in). Bewick's swan is similar in appearance to the parapatric whooper swan (C. cygnus), but is smaller, shorter-necked and has a more rounded head shape, with variable bill pattern, but always showing more black than yellow and having a blunt forward edge of the yellow base patch. Whooper swans have a bill that has more yellow than black and the forward edge of the yellow patch is usually pointed. The bill pattern for every individual Bewick's swan is unique, and scientists often make detailed drawings of each bill and assign names to the swans to assist with studying these birds. The eastern birds, apart from being larger, tend towards less yellow on the bill, perhaps indicating that gene flow across Beringia, while marginal, never entirely ceased. An apparent case of hybridization between a Bewick's and a vagrant whistling swan has been reported from eastern Siberia.

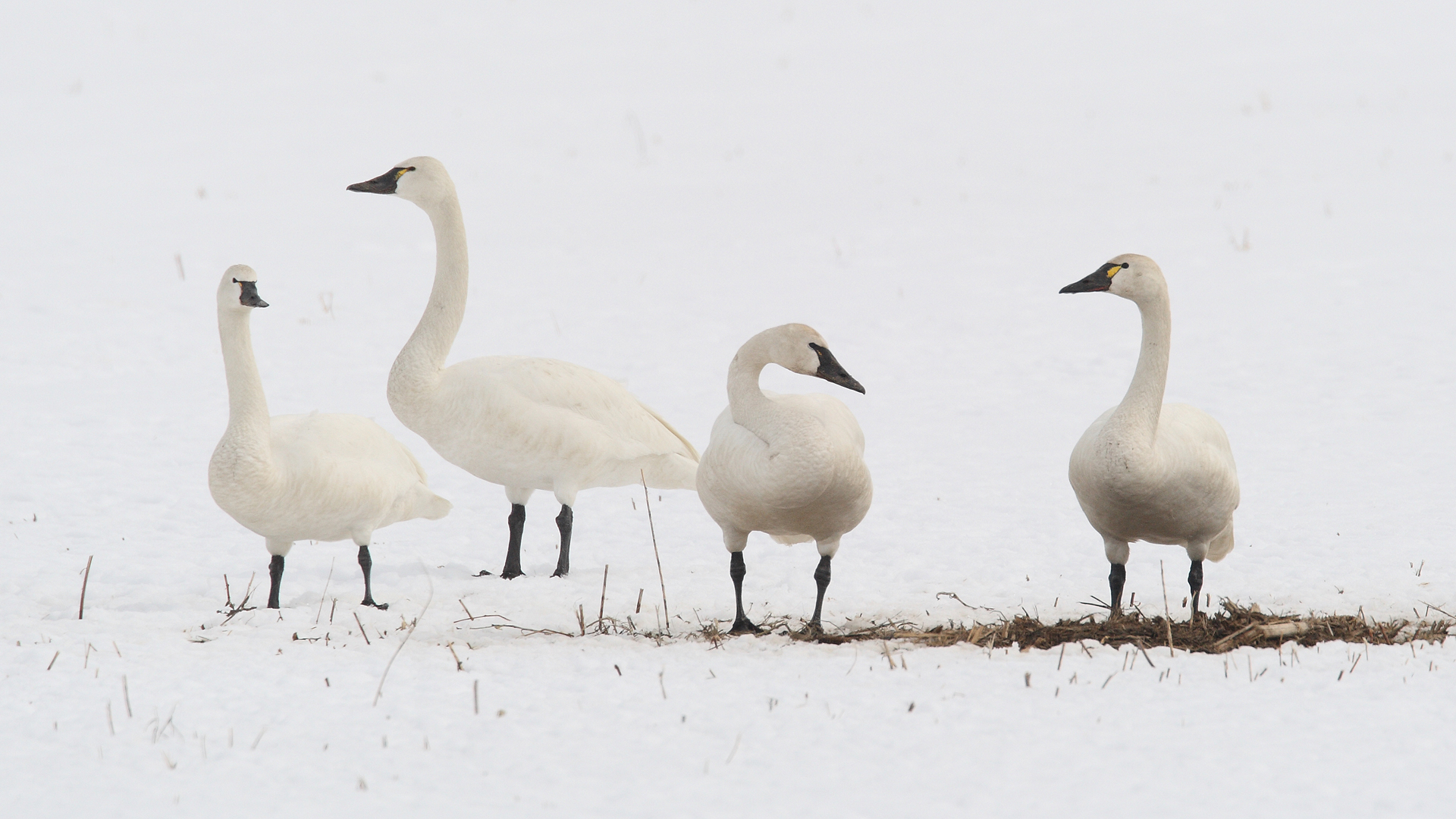
Adult whistling swans (C. c. columbianus). Click to magnify for seeing variation in the yellow bill spots.

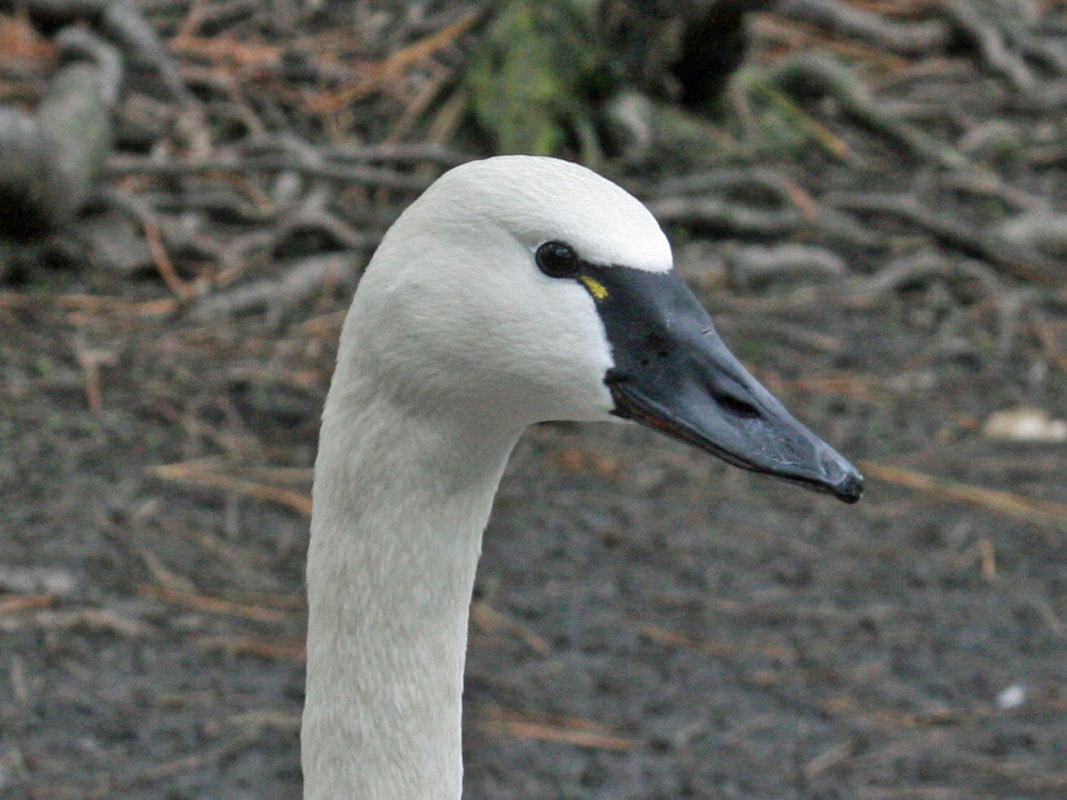
Whistling swan with yellow patch at base of bill

Whistling swans can weigh between 3.8–10.5 kg (8.4–23.1 lb) as adults. On average, males weigh 7.2 kg (16 lb) and females weigh 6.3 kg (14 lb). They measure 120–150 cm (47–59 in) in total length. Each wing is 50–57 cm (19.7–22.4 in) long; the tarsus measures 9.4–11.4 cm (3.7–4.5 in) in length, and the bill is 9.1–10.7 cm (3.6–4.2 in) long. C. c. columbianus is distinguished from C. c. bewickii by its larger size and the mostly black bill, with just a small and usually hard to see yellow spot of variable size at the base. It is distinguished from the largely allopatric trumpeter swan (C. buccinator) of North America by that species' much larger size and particularly long bill, which is black all over except for the pink mouthline, which is stronger than in the whistling swan.

Note that color variations with more or less yellow, or pink instead of yellow or black, are not exceptional, especially in Bewick's swans, which very rarely may even have yellowish feet. The small size and particularly the rather short neck, which make it look like a large white goose, are still distinguishing marks.

=== Vocalization ===
Tundra swans have high-pitched honking calls and sound similar to a black goose (Branta). They are particularly vocal when foraging in flocks on their wintering grounds; any conspecific arriving or leaving will elicit a bout of loud excited calling from its fellows. Contrary to its common name, the ground calls of the whistling swan are not a whistle and neither notably different from that of Bewick's swan. The flight call of the latter is a low and soft ringing bark, bow-wow...; the whistling swan gives a markedly high-pitched trisyllabic bark like wow-wow-wow in flight. By contrast, the whooper and trumpeter swans' names accurately describe their calls—a deep hooting and a higher-pitched French horn-like honk, respectively. Flying birds of these species are shorter-necked and have a quicker wingbeat than their relatives, but they are often impossible to tell apart except by their calls.

== Distribution ==
As their common name implies, the tundra swan breeds in the tundra of the Arctic and subarctic, where they inhabit shallow pools, lakes and rivers. These birds, unlike mute swans (C. olor) but like the other Arctic swans, are migratory birds. The winter habitat of both subspecies is grassland and marshland, often near the coast; they like to visit fields after harvest to feed on discarded grains and while on migration may stop over on mountain lakes. According to National Geographic, when migrating these birds can fly at altitudes of 8 km (5.0 mi) in a V formation.

=== C. c. bewickii distribution ===
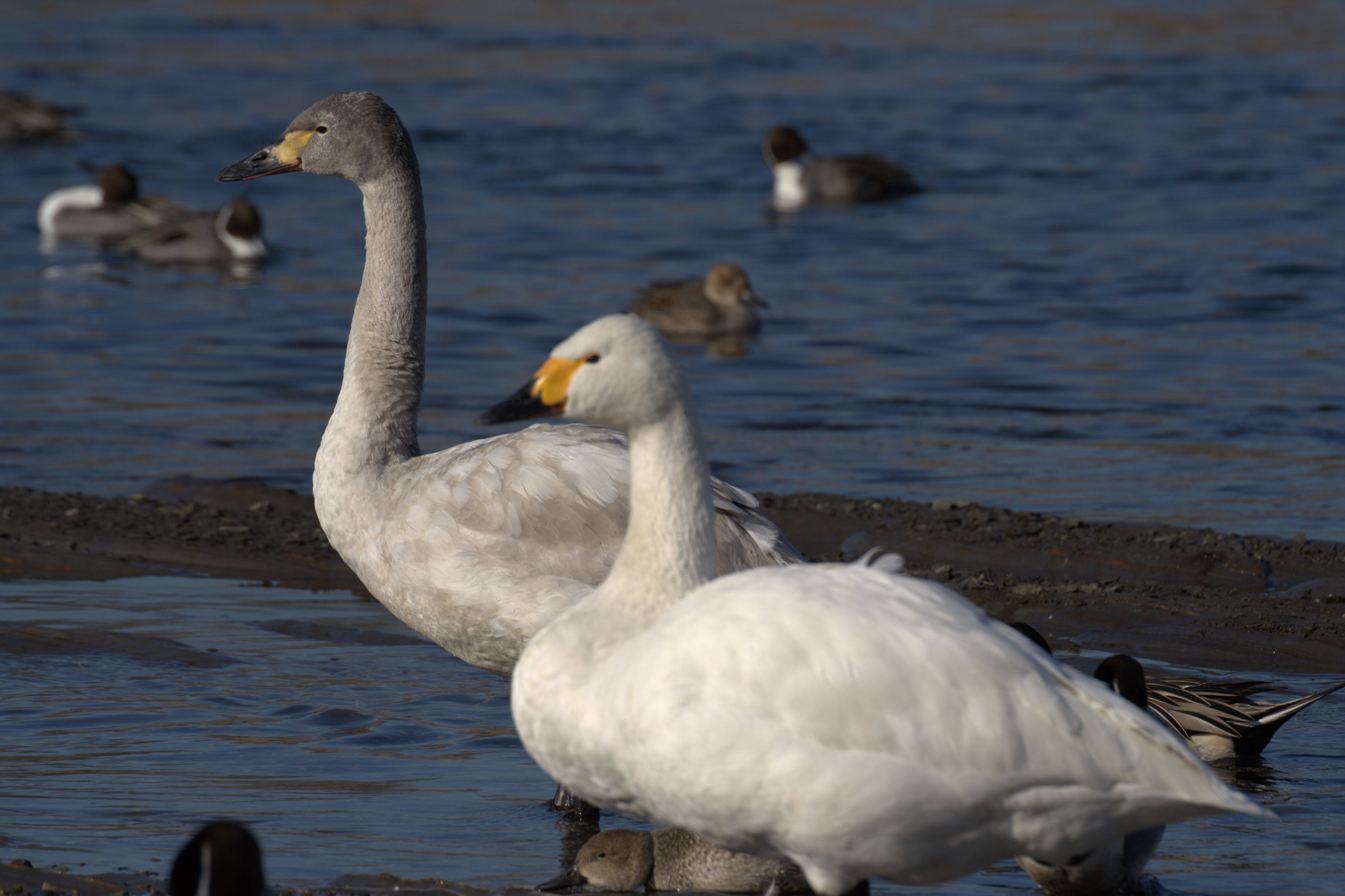
Adult (front) and half-year-old immature Bewick's swans (C. c. bewickii) wintering in Saitama (Japan)

The breeding range of C. c. bewickii extends across the coastal lowlands of Siberia, from the Kola Peninsula east to the Pacific. They start to arrive on the breeding grounds around mid-May, and leave for winter quarters around the end of September. The populations west of the Taymyr Peninsula migrate via the White Sea, Baltic Sea and the estuary of the Elbe to winter in Denmark, the Netherlands and the British Isles. They are common in winter in the wildfowl nature reserves of the Royal Society for the Protection of Birds and of the Wildfowl & Wetlands Trust. Some birds also winter elsewhere on the southern shores of the North Sea. Bewick's swans breeding in eastern Russia migrate via Mongolia and northern China to winter in the coastal regions of Korea, Japan, and southern China, south to Guangdong and occasionally as far as Taiwan. A few birds from the central Siberian range also winter in Iran at the south of the Caspian Sea; in former times these flocks also migrated to the Aral Sea before the late 20th century ecological catastrophe turned most of the habitat there into inhospitable wasteland. Arrival in winter quarters starts about mid-October, though most spend weeks or even months at favorite resting locations and will only arrive in winter quarters by November or even as late as January. The birds leave winter quarters to breed starting in mid-February. Vagrants may occur south of the main wintering range in cold years and have been recorded from most European countries where the birds do not regularly winter, as well as Algeria, Iraq, Israel, Libya, Nepal, northeast Pakistan, and on the Mariana and Volcano Islands in the western Pacific. Vagrants on the spring migration have been sighted on Bear Island, Iceland and Svalbard, and in Alaska, Oregon and Saskatchewan in North America.

=== C. c. columbianus distribution ===
C. c. columbianus breeds in the coastal plains of Alaska and Canada, leaving for winter quarters about October. They arrive in winter quarters by November/December. Birds breeding in western Alaska winter along the Pacific coast from southern Alaska to California; they often move inland – particularly to the rich feeding grounds in the Central Valley – and some cross the Rocky Mountains again and winter as far east as Utah and south to Texas and northern Mexico. The birds breeding along the Arctic Ocean coast migrate via Canada and the Great Lakes region to winter at the Atlantic coast of the United States, mainly from Maryland to North Carolina, but some move as far south as Florida. Whistling swans start leaving for the breeding grounds again by mid-March, and arrive by late May. Vagrants have been recorded on the Bermudas, Cuba the Hawaiian Islands, Puerto Rico, and in England, Ireland, Japan, northeastern Siberia and Sweden.

== Ecology and biology ==
About 15% of the adults die each year from various causes, and thus the average lifespan in the wild is about 10 years. The oldest recorded tundra swan was over 24 years old.

=== Diet ===
In summer, their diet consists mainly of aquatic vegetation, e.g. mannagrass (Glyceria), Potamogeton pondweeds and marine eelgrass (Zostera), acquired by sticking the head underwater or upending while swimming; they also eat some grass growing on dry land. At other times of year, leftover grains and other crops such as potatoes, picked up in open fields after harvest, make up much of their diet. Tundra swans forage mainly by day. In the breeding season, they tend to be territorial and are aggressive to many animals who pass by; outside the breeding season they are rather gregarious birds.

=== Predation ===
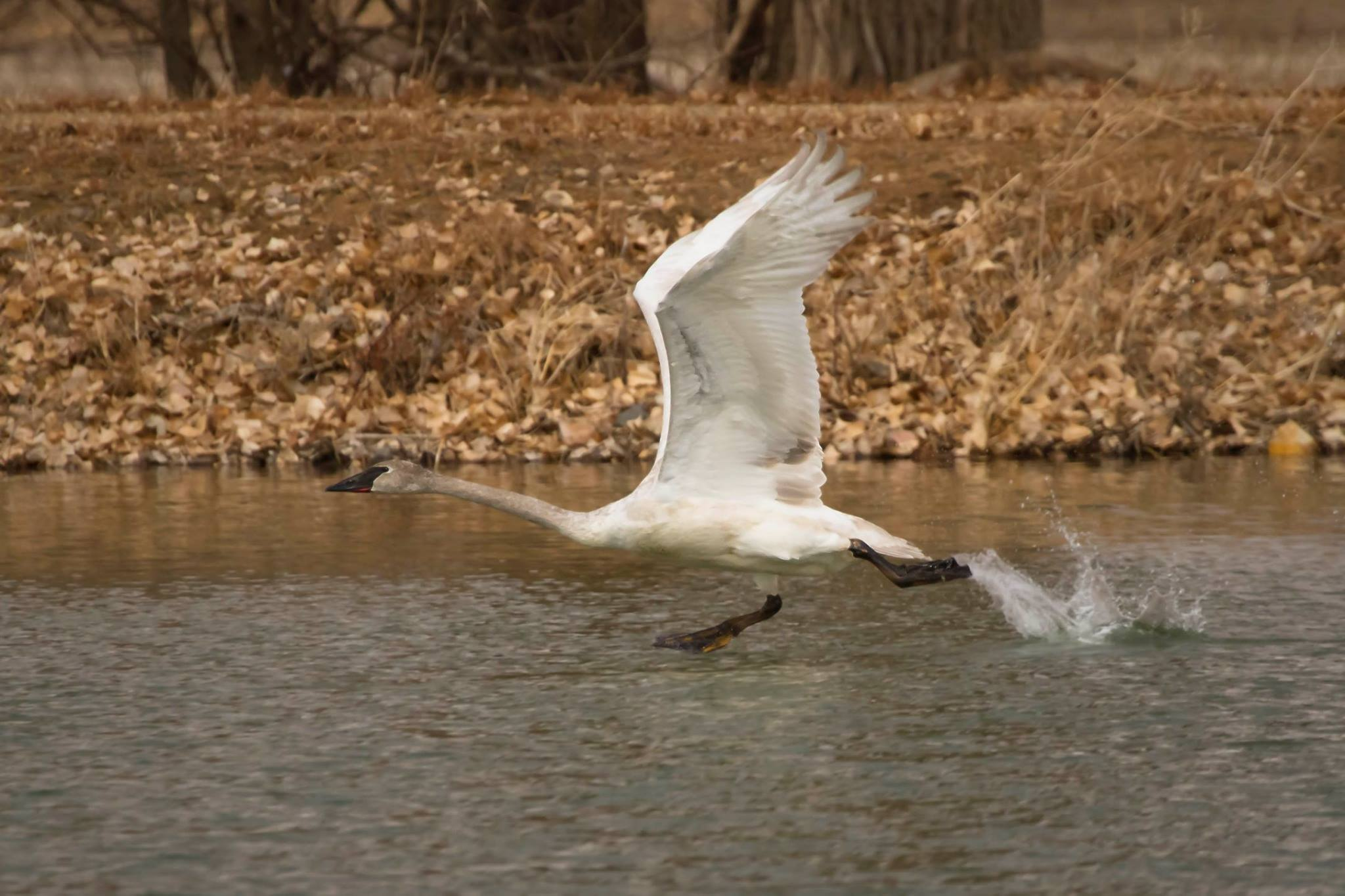
Juvenile taking off from water

Healthy adult birds have few natural predators. The Arctic fox (Vulpes lagopus), parasitic jaegers (Stercorarius parasiticus), and glaucous gull (Larus hyperboreus) can take the eggs and hatchlings. Adults typically can stand their ground and displace foxes and birds but occasionally they are successful when both adults are absent due to disturbance or territorial dispute. Another surprisingly serious nest predator for tundra swans are brown bears (Ursus arctos), which were apparently the primary cause of nesting failure in both the Arctic National Wildlife Refuge and Izembek National Wildlife Refuge. Other potential nest predators include red fox (Vulpes vulpes), golden eagles (Aquila chrysaetos). Brown bear, golden eagles and rarely, gray wolves (Canis lupus) may on occasion succeed at capturing and killing an adult. Small or avian predators usually elicit either an aggressive response or the behavior of sitting tight on nests while larger mammals, perhaps more dangerous to adults, usually elicit the response of leading the cygnets into deep waters and standing still until they pass.

=== Reproduction ===
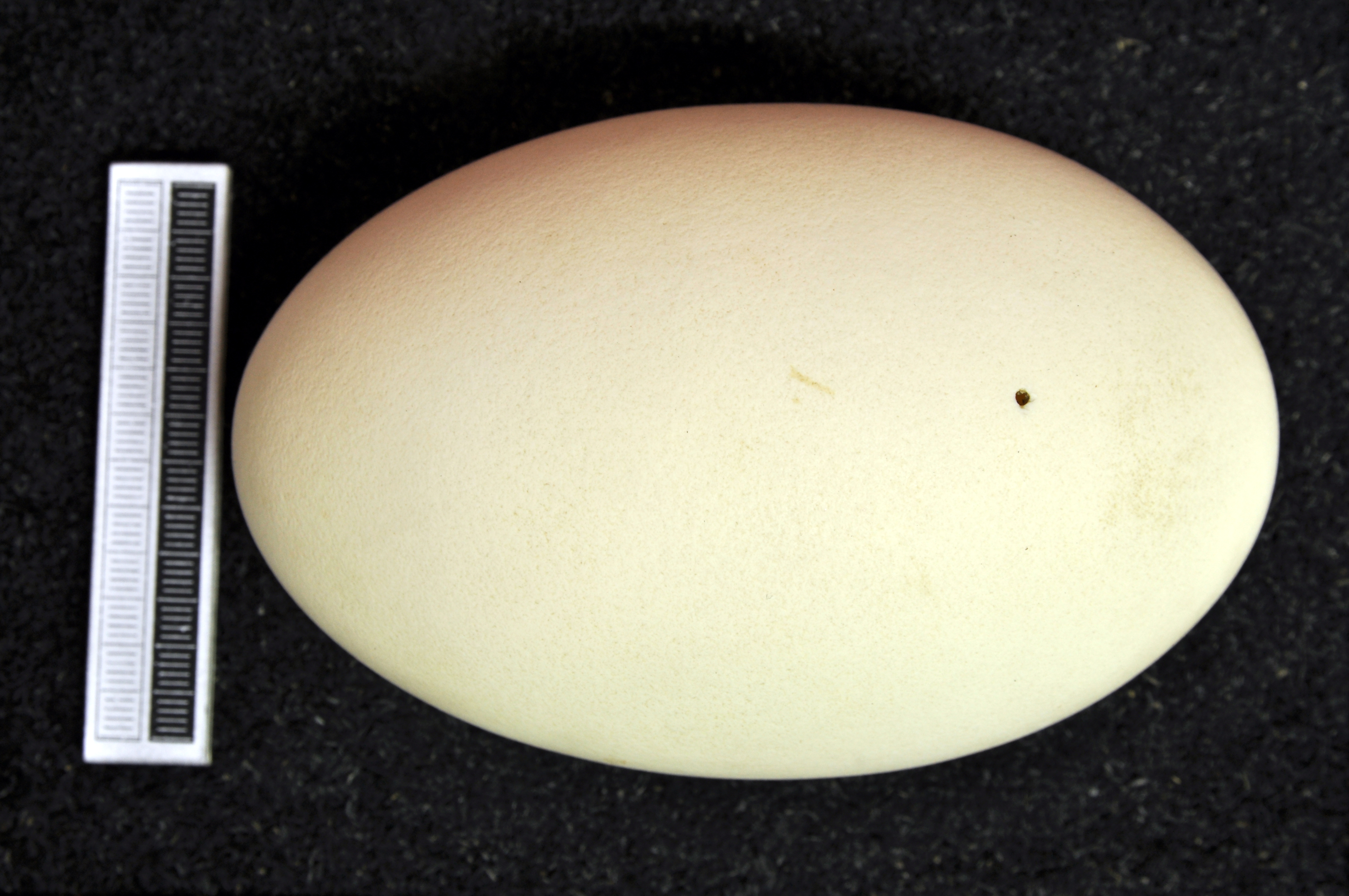
The egg

The tundra swans mate in the late spring, usually after they have returned to the nesting grounds; as usual for swans, they pair monogamously until one partner dies. Should one partner die long before the other, the surviving bird often will not mate again for some years, or even for its entire life. The nesting season starts at the end of May. The pair build the large mound-shaped nest from plant material at an elevated site near open water, and defend a large territory around it. The pen (female) lays and incubates a clutch of 2–7 (usually 3–5) eggs. The eggs are measure 9–11.6 cm (3.5–4.6 in) in length and 5.9–7.4 cm (2.3–2.9 in) in width. The cob (male) keeps a steady lookout for potential predators heading towards his mate and offspring. When either of them spots a threat, they give a warning sound to let their partner know that danger is approaching. Sometimes the cob will use his wings to run faster and appear larger in order to scare away a predator.

The time from laying to hatching is 29–30 days for Bewick's swan and 30–32 days for the whistling swan. Since they nest in cold regions, tundra swan cygnets grow faster than those of swans breeding in warmer climates; those of the whistling swan take about 60–75 days to fledge—twice as fast as those of the mute swan for example—while those of Bewick's swan, about which little breeding data is known, may fledge a record 40–45 days after hatching already. The fledglings stay with their parents for the first winter migration. The family is sometimes even joined by their offspring from previous breeding seasons while on the wintering grounds; Tundra swans do not reach sexual maturity until 3 or 4 years of age.

== Conservation status ==
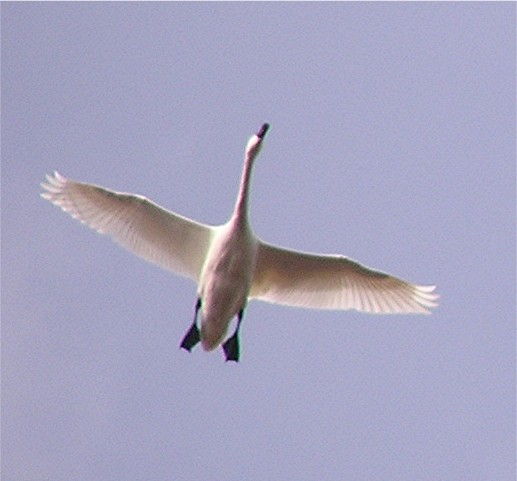
Adult whistling swan in flight. Seen from below, all "Arctic" swans look almost identical

The whistling swan is the most common swan species of North America, estimated to number almost 170,000 individuals around 1990. Its numbers seem to be slowly declining in the west of its range since the late 19th century, coincident with the expansion of human settlement and habitat conversion in the birds' wintering areas; the eastern whistling swan populations on the other hand seem to be increasing somewhat, and altogether its numbers seem to have slightly risen in the late 20th century (the population was estimated at 146,000 in 1972). Bewick's swan remains far less known; although its population is in decline in northwestern Europe, for currently unexplained reasons. The European winter population was estimated at 16,000–17,000 about 1990, with about 20,000 birds wintering in east Asia. The Iranian wintering population is small—1,000 birds or so at most—but they usually disperse to several sites, some of which are still unknown to scientists.

Although tundra swan numbers are stable over most of its range, they are increasingly dependent on agricultural crops to supplement their winter diet, as aquatic vegetation in their winter habitat dwindles due to habitat destruction and water pollution. But the main cause of adult mortality is hunting; 4,000 whistling swans are bagged officially each year, while a further 6,000–10,000 are killed by poachers and native subsistence hunter-gatherers. Bewick's swan cannot be hunted legally, but almost half the birds studied contained lead shot in their body, indicating they were shot at by poachers. Lead poisoning by ingestion of lead shot is a very significant cause of mortality also, particularly in the whistling swan. The tundra swan is not considered threatened by the International Union for Conservation of Nature (IUCN) due to its large range and population. The proposed subspecies jankowskii was for some time placed on CITES Appendix II; it was eventually removed since it is not generally accepted as valid.

Bewick's swan is one of the birds to which the Agreement on the Conservation of African-Eurasian Migratory Waterbirds (AEWA) applies.

Toxic mining wastes in the Silver Valley, Idaho in the United States has been known to be responsible for the death of migrating tundra swans.

== Comparison with related species ==
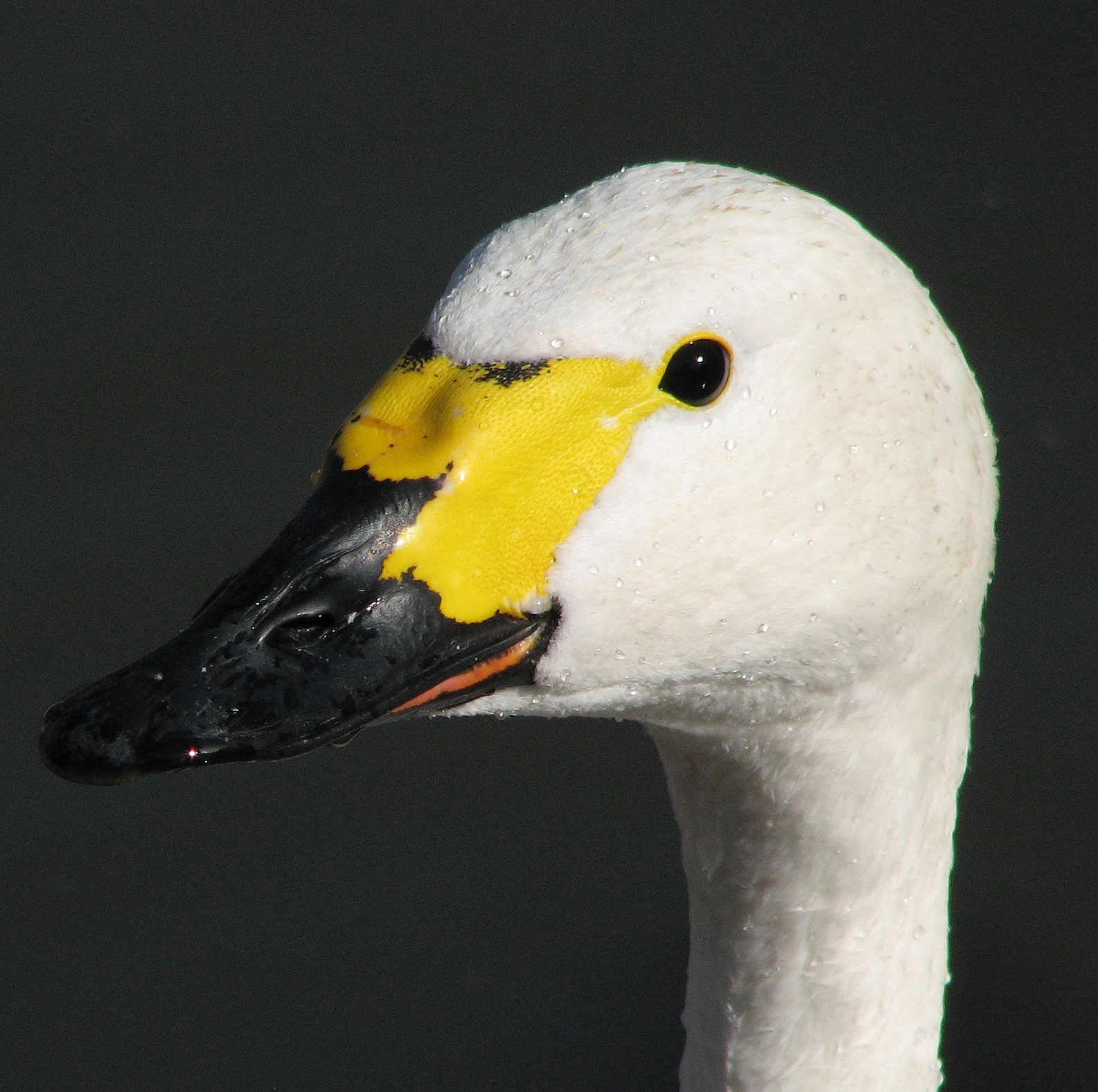
Head of a Bewick's swan, C. c. bewickii

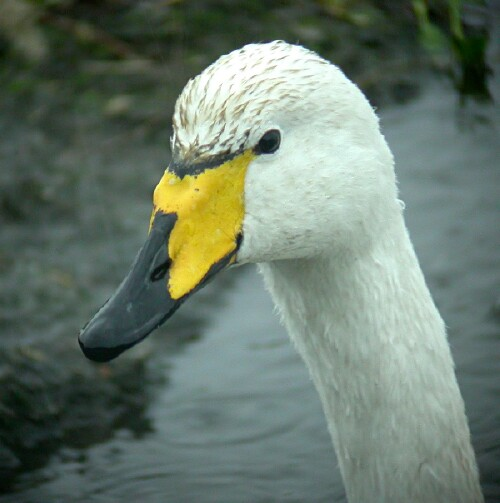
Head of a whooper swan, C. cygnus

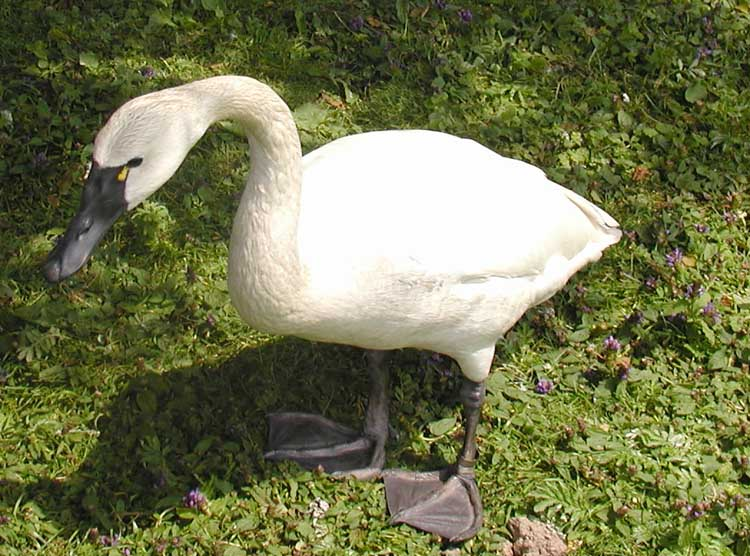
Whistling swan, C. c. columbianus

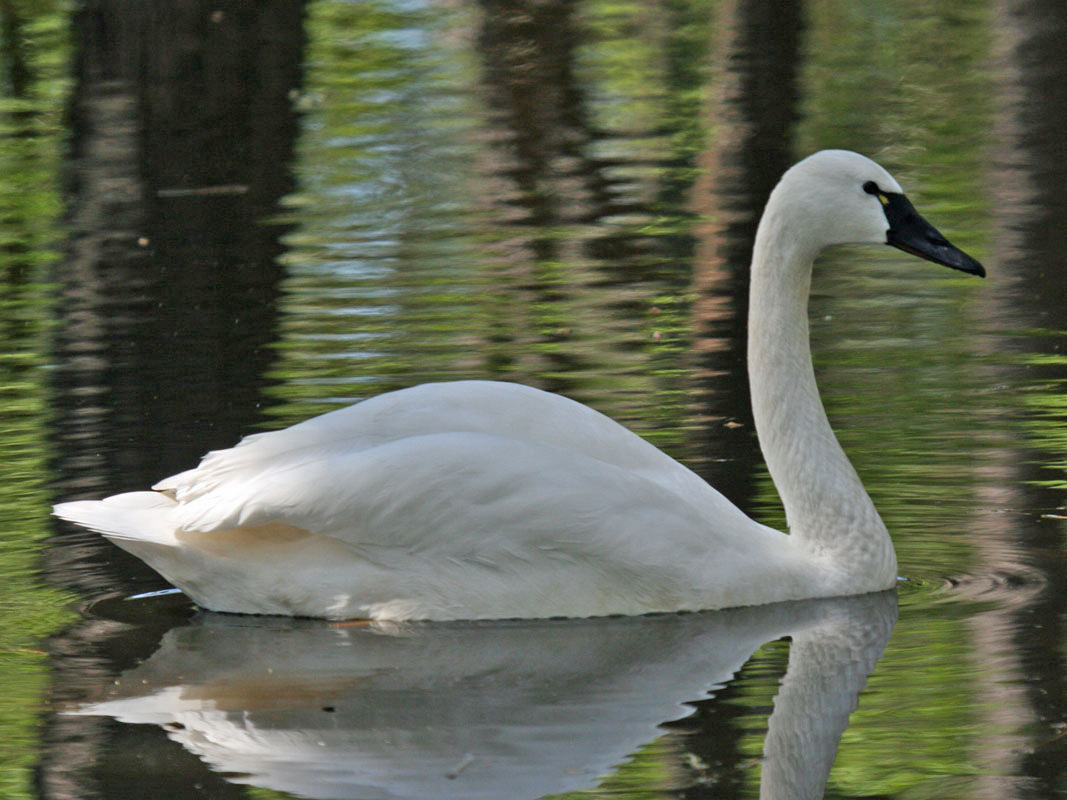
Whistling swan, C. c. columbianus

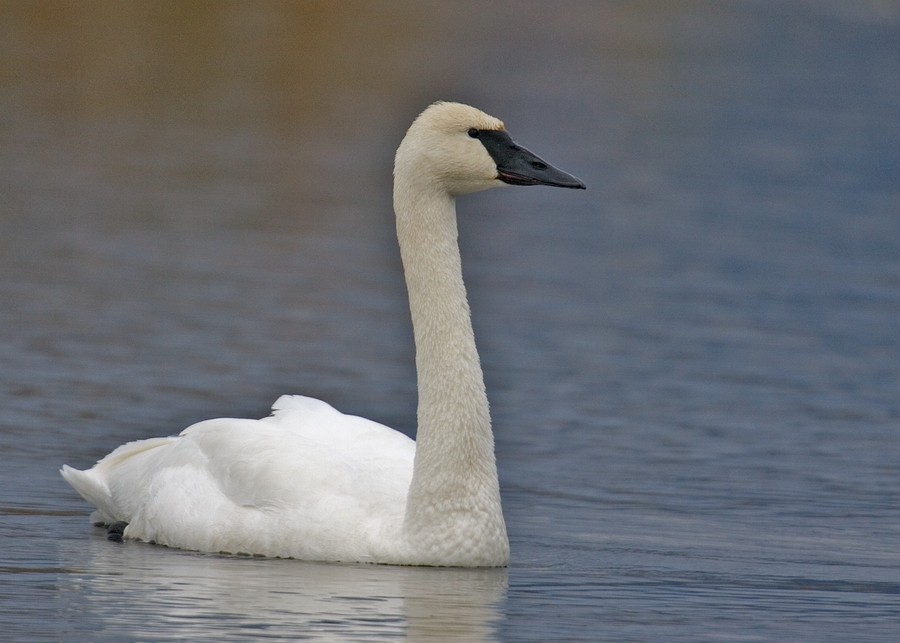
Trumpeter swan, C. buccinator

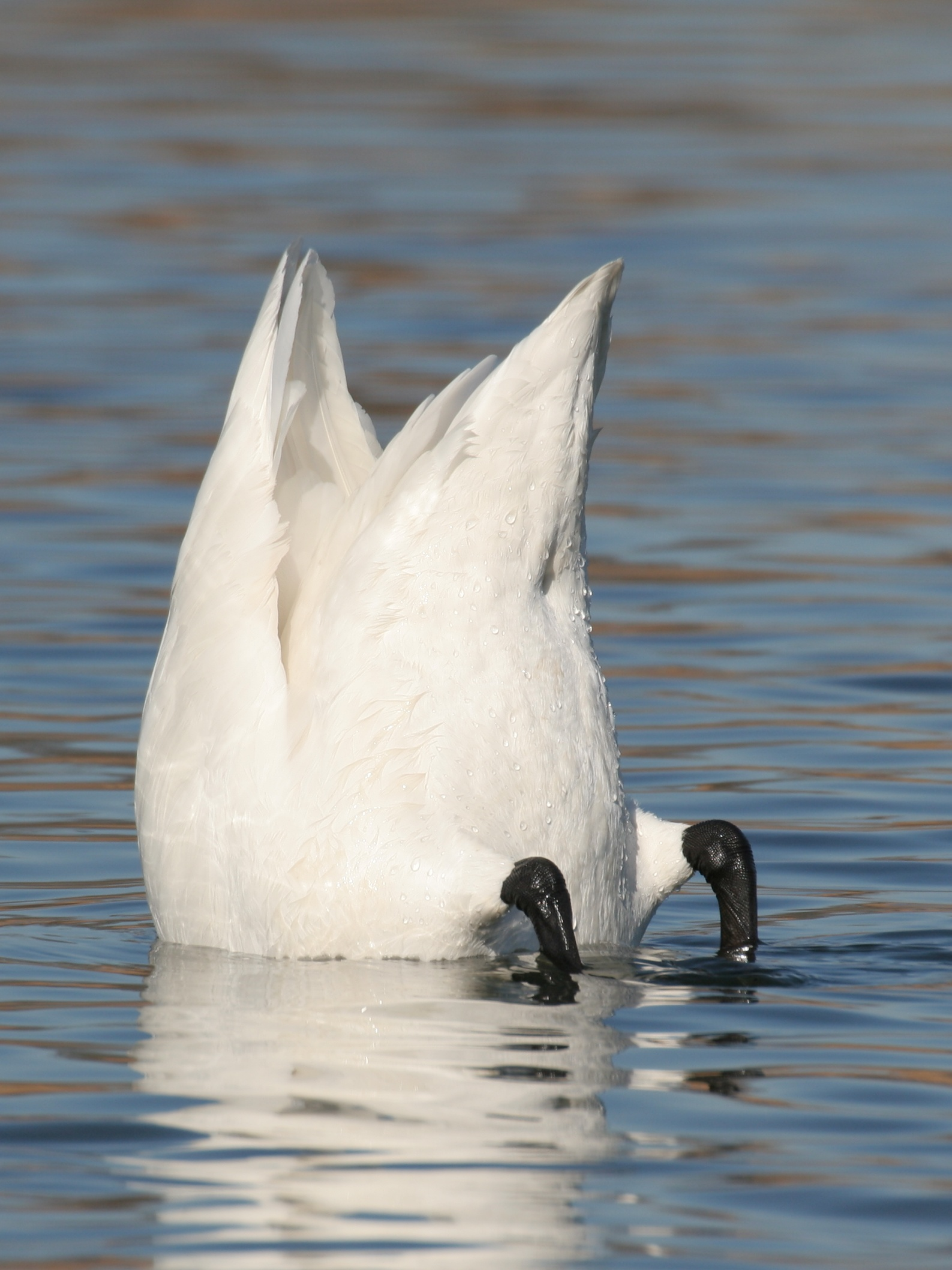
Bewick's swan feeding by upending

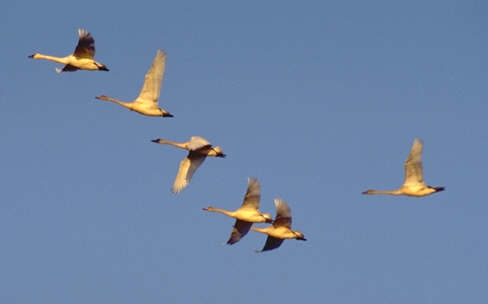
Flock of adult and young whistling swans

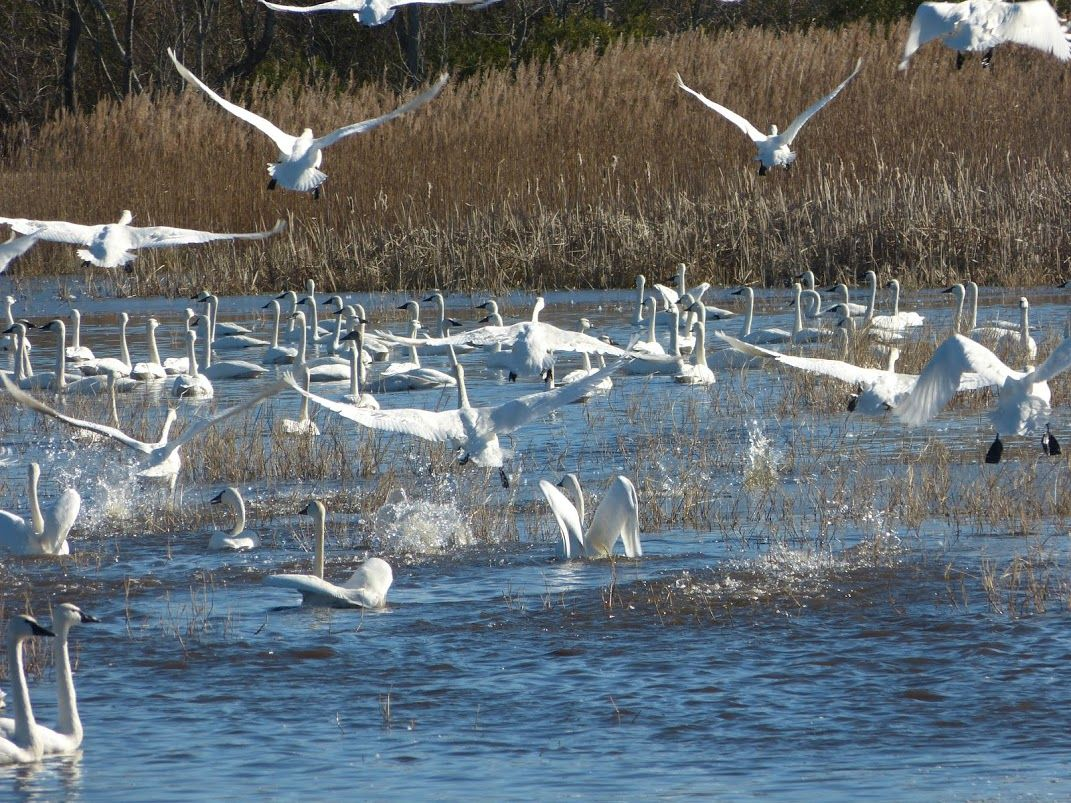
Tundra swans alight at Mattamuskeet National Wildlife Refuge in North Carolina
