= Old William Lamshaw =

"Old" William Lamshaw, (c.1712-1798), was one of the earliest players of the Northumbrian Smallpipes of whom much is known. Besides being a celebrated piper in his own right, appointed to the post of piper to the Duchess of Northumberland after the death of Joseph Turnbull in 1775, he was the teacher of several other known pipers, and the grandfather of Young William Lamshaw, who succeeded him as piper to the Duchess.

== Early life ==
No record of his birth has been found, but his birth date has been deduced from his recorded age at death. Birth records in Northumberland in the early years of the 18th century are patchy. In 1752, he married Elizabeth Hall, in Morpeth; he was described as 'William Lamshaw of Ponteland' in the register, meaning that he lived in that town at the time. The births of five children are recorded, including William, born in 1755, the father of Young William Lamshaw. Apart from their first born, Elizabeth, who was christened in Bedlington, their children were christened in Morpeth, suggesting that the family settled in the town.

== Morpeth Wait ==
William Lamshaw, along with Thomas Gleghorn, is named in the Morpeth Bailiff's accounts for 1764, 1765 and 1766, as one of the town Waits. This post combined the functions of town musician and town watchman, and carried some status. The livery consisted of a green coat and drab knee breeches, together with the silver badge of the Corporation worn upon the right arm. Its cost was borne by the Corporation at the cost of 13s. 4d. per annum. In nearby Alnwick, the Waits were entitled to collect an annual fee from each house, amounting to more than £30. In Morpeth, a similar arrangement may have operated, but two annual payments of 2s.6d. were made to the Waits directly by the Corporation, as well as occasional payments. When Morpeth had advertised the vacant post in 1744, the advertisement commented 'It is a place of considerable profit'. Lamshaw may have held the post until his death, for the record of his burial names him as one of the Waits.

== Ducal Piper ==
After the death of Joseph Turnbull in 1775, Lamshaw was appointed as piper to the Duchess, appearing in Ducal records from 1780 and at some point after this, Thomas Bewick, the engraver, recalled: 'The late Mr Dibden, who often called upon me, had some performance to exhibit at our Theatre, & had quarrelled with the Theatrical Band, on acct of their exorbitant demands & in this dilemma, he expressed himself to me how much he felt disappointed & knew not what to do — I told him, I thought, if he would leave the matter to me, I could set all right,& instantly applied to old William Lamshaw, the Duke of Northumberland’s Piper to ask him if he thought he could engage to play at the Theatre that night; being well acquainted with the old man he readily assented—I then told my friend Dibden of what I had done, & satisfied him, as to the preference the Audience would give to the Piper — in this I was not mistaken, for all went well off & every one expressed both pleasure & surprise at the change.' This account, though written some 25 years later, is the best evidence of Lamshaw's popularity as a performer during his lifetime. Eight years after his death, in 1806, he was remembered in the obituary notice for his grandson Young William Lamshaw, 'This celebrated performer on the improved small pipes, was grandson of the celebrated piper Lamshaw, of Morpeth'.

== Influence on later pipers ==
A later ducal piper, William Green, recalled, writing to the Ancient Melodies Committee of the Newcastle Society of Antiquaries, that John Peacock had studied first with Old William Lamshaw, and later with Joseph Turnbull. He also wrote to them 'I never knew any other Pipes but the Northumberland small Pipes used in the Regiment. The late Mr. Cant who kept the Blue Bell publick house at Newcastle and a person whose name was Graham play'd the small Pipes in the American War, then in the French war one Lamshaw and myself whose nephew I succeeded as piper to his Grace's the old Duke of N.' If Green is referring to Old William Lamshaw here, his statement that Young William Lamshaw was his nephew is an error on his part. However, an alternative reading, consistent with the known facts, is that one of Old William's sons, an uncle of Young William, was also a piper, but there is no other record of this.

Another piper said by Green to have learned from Lamshaw was William Cant, who had been postboy for Joseph Turnbull, and who was William Green's uncle. A local poet and cobbler, James Waddell of Plessey, in 1809, referred to a local vicar (unnamed by him, but elsewhere identified as Rev. Henry Cotes, of Bedlington), who played the pipes, being taught by 'Old' William Lamshaw, who was piper to the Duke of Northumberland. Since Waddell also states that Cotes subsequently studied the pipes with Thomas Hair, who was still only 19 when Lamshaw died, it is plausible to argue that Hair had also been a pupil of Lamshaw, but there is no direct evidence of this.

A set of Border pipes traditionally said to have belonged to Lamshaw is in Edinburgh. However, there is no hard evidence of him having owned them.
