= Morpeth Chantry =

Church in Morpeth, Northumberland, England

Coordinates: 55°10′01″N 1°41′13″W

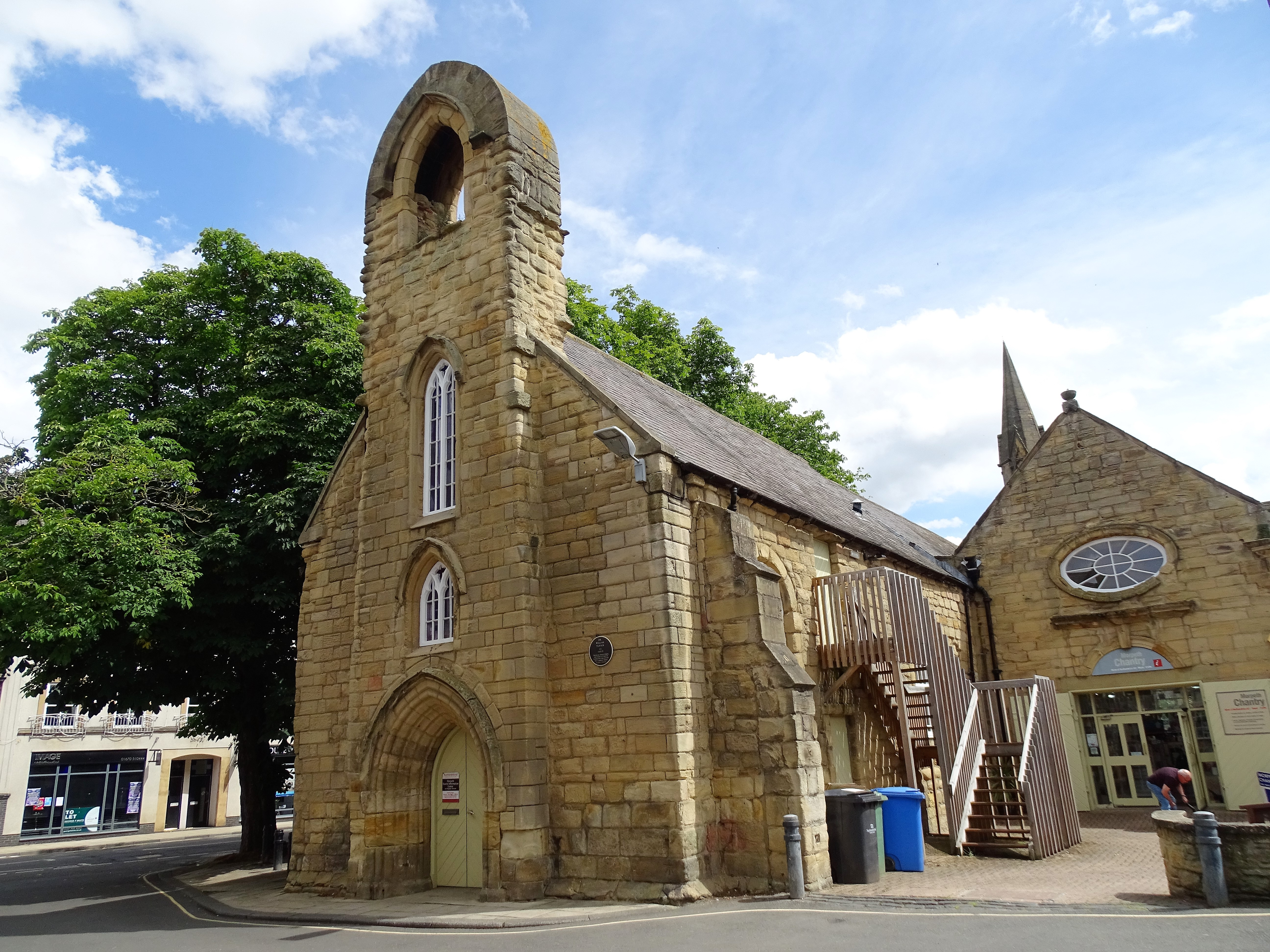

Morpeth Chantry also known as All Saints Chantry is a Grade I listed building situated adjacent to the site of the ancient bridge across the River Wansbeck at Morpeth, Northumberland.

It was built in about 1296 and served both as a chapel dedicated to All Saints and as a toll house for the river crossing. The duties of the appointed chaplain also included those of schoolmaster.

The suppression of the monasteries by Henry VIII was followed in 1547 by the suppression of chantries by Edward VI and the building was deconsecrated. In 1552 a Royal Charter was granted for the establishment of a free grammar school. The school now known as King Edward VI School occupied the site until a new school was built elsewhere in the Borough in 1846.

Thereafter the building was occupied for a variety of commercial purposes including a mineral water factory. In 1974 the neglected and deteriorating property was acquired by the local authority and after restoration and refurbishment was opened for community use in 1984. Tenants occupying the building include the Northern Poetry Library, Northumbria Craft Centre, Morpeth Chantry Bagpipe Museum, and the Tourist Information Office.
