= John Dunn (pipemaker) =

John Dunn (ca. 1764–1820) was a pipemaker, or maker of bagpipes. Born in Newcastle upon Tyne, England, Dunn was a cabinet maker by profession, initially a junior partner with George Brummell. In the trade directories, he also appears in his own right as a turner (Whitehead 1790) and a plumb maker and turner (Mackenzie & Dent 1811). His address was Bell's Court, off Pilgrim Street. He was buried on 6 February 1820 in St. John's, Newcastle. His father may have been one John Dunn of Longhorsley; if so, he was born on 3 September 1764. He should not be confused with one M. Dunn, the maker of several surviving sets of Union pipes.

== Work with bagpipes ==
Dunn was a maker of Northumbrian smallpipes and is regarded as the first to have added keys to the chanter, (c. 1800 AD), extending the range of the instrument from an octave to a twelfth. He may thus be regarded as an inventor of the modern instrument.

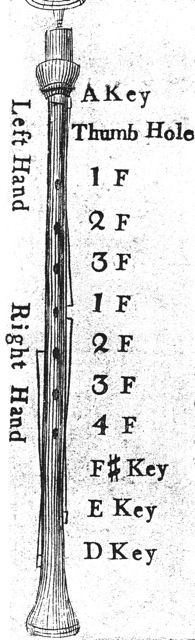
Peacock's keyed chanter

The earliest evidence of such a keyed chanter is the illustration and fingering chart in John Peacock's tunebook, A Favorite Collection of Tunes with Variations Adapted for the Northumberland Small Pipes, Violin, or Flute, first published by William Wright, of Newcastle, in about 1800. This depicts a simple keyless chanter with an octave range from G to g, as well as J. Peacock's New Invented Pipe Chanter with the addition of Four Keys, these keys were for the notes low D, E, F sharp, and high a. Subsequent makers, particularly Robert Reid, added more keys to extend the range further, and include chromatic notes.

A set of pipes with a single-octave chanter was presented by John Dunn to John Peacock in 1797; this set now lacks the original chanter, but still carries the original engraved ferrule on the drone-stock reading: 'The Gift of John Dunn to John Peacock Newcastle 1797'. The engraved inscription is generally thought to have been done in the workshop of Thomas Bewick. It was acquired by the Society of Antiquaries of Newcastle upon Tyne, with the support of the Victoria and Albert Museum in 2004, and is now in the Morpeth Chantry Bagpipe Museum.

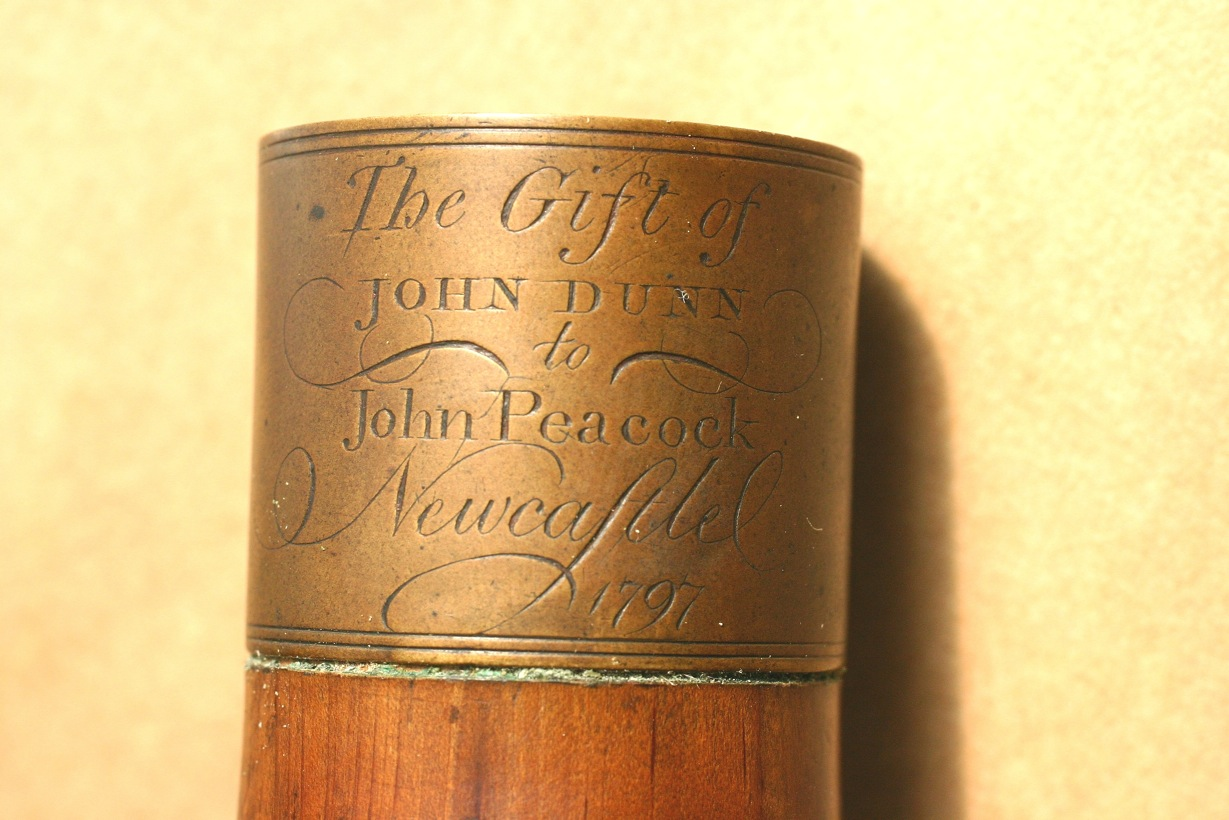
The engraved drone-ferrule on Peacock's pipes.

Several sets survive made by Dunn, one of which is the set he made for Robert Bewick, now in the Morpeth Chantry Bagpipe Museum.

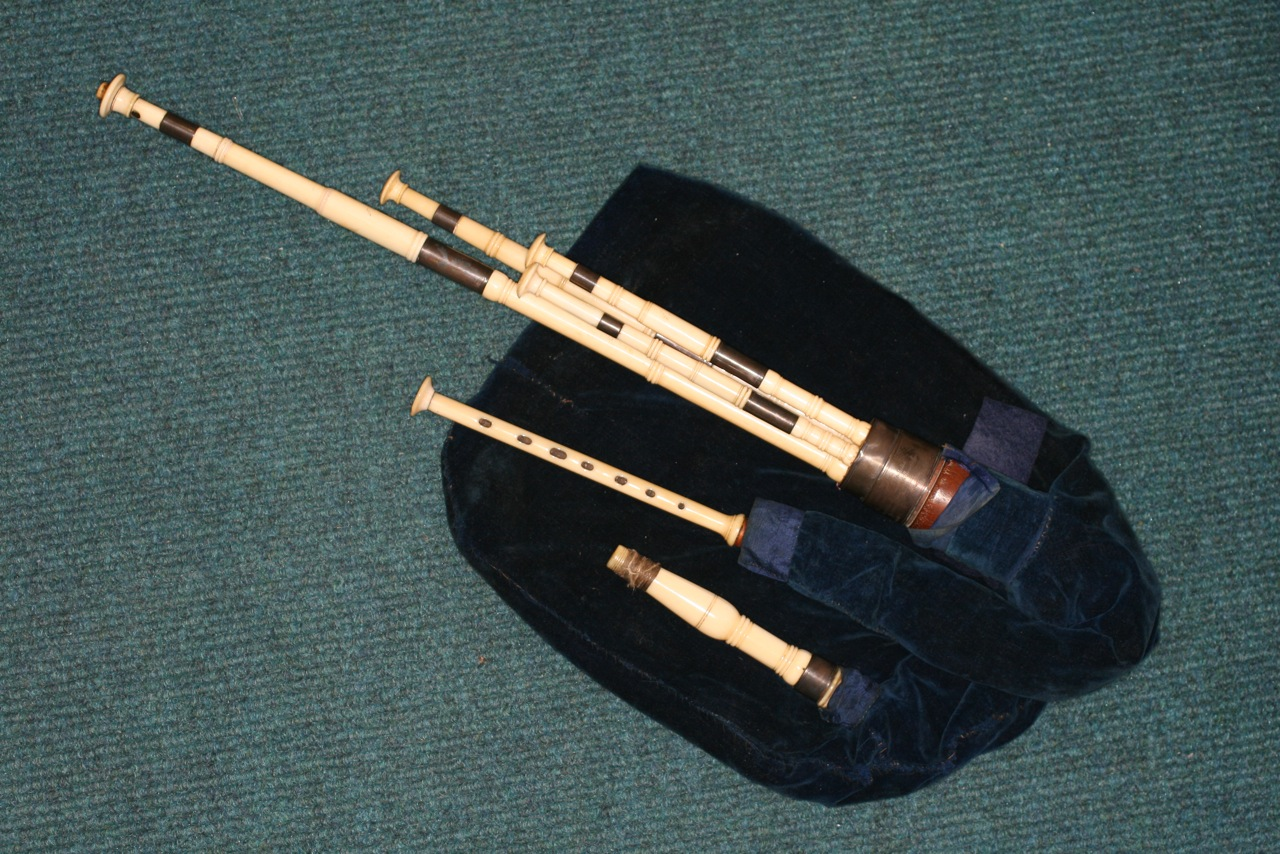
These Northumbrian smallpipes were made by John Dunn, and belonged to Robert Bewick. They have an inscription on the dronestock ferrule stating their provenance. It is likely that this simple chanter is not the original, which was probably keyed.

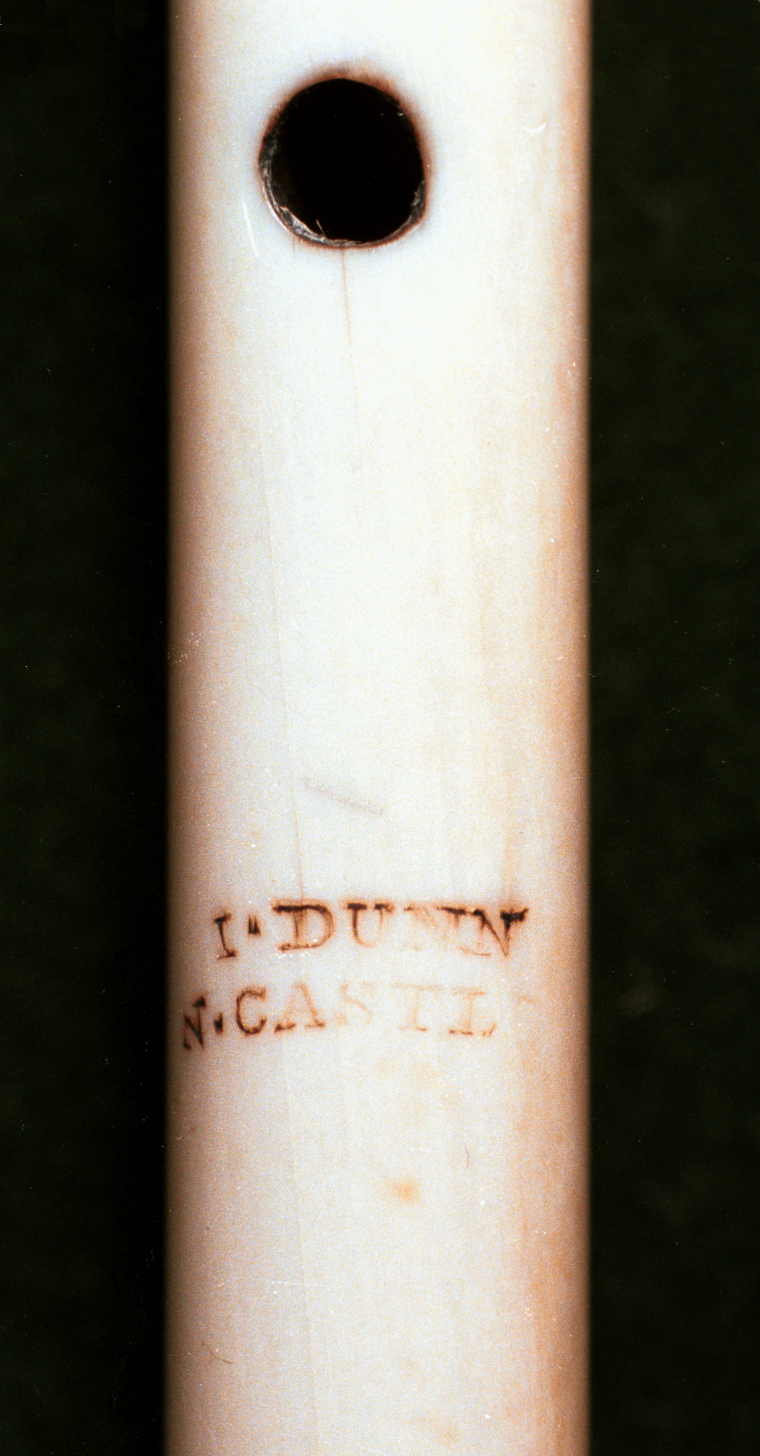
Dunn's maker's stamp

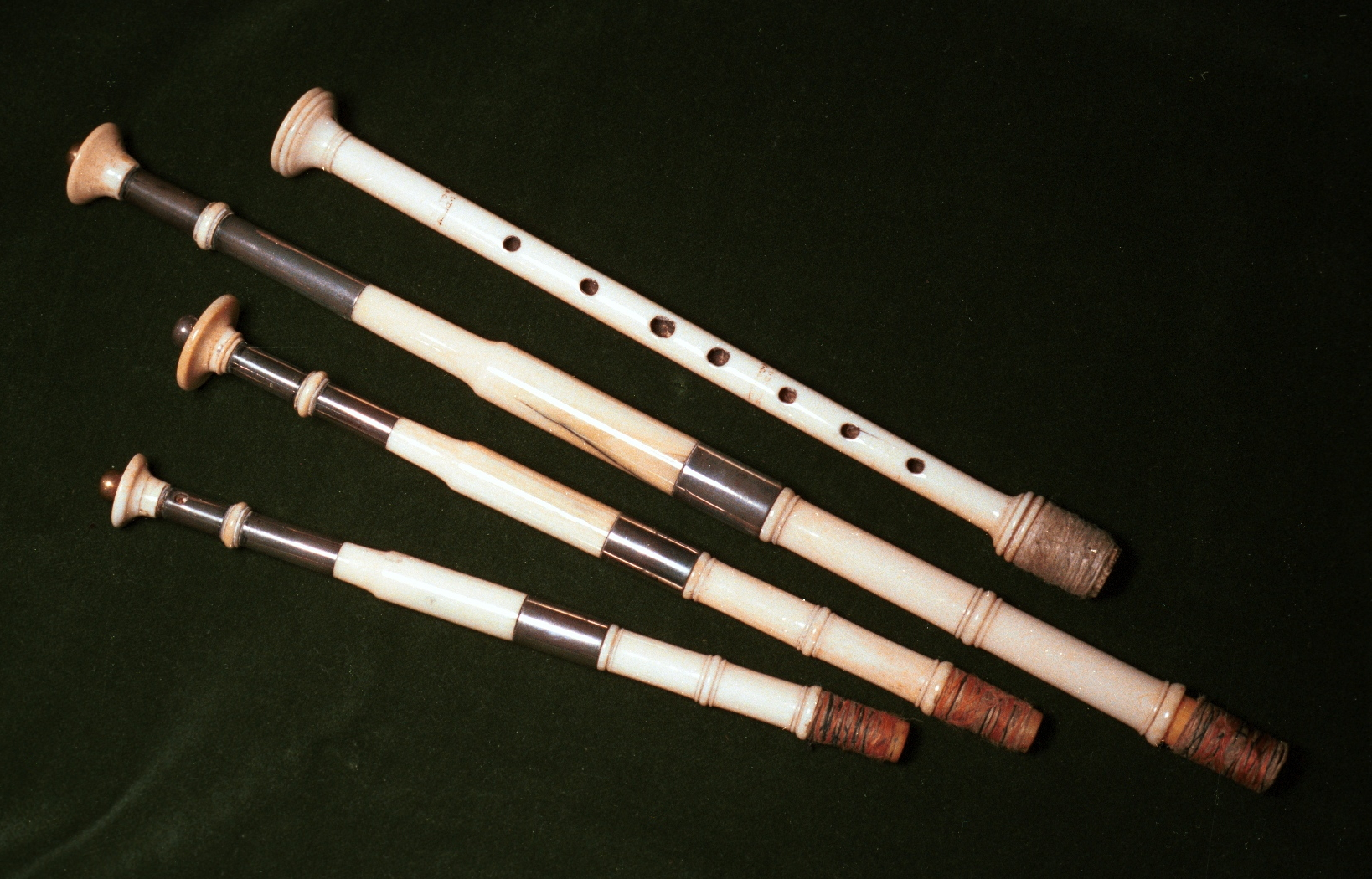
Chanter and drones of a set of smallpipes by John Dunn, currently in the Morpeth Chantry Bagpipe Museum

After John's death in 1820, his son, also named John, continued the business, and an entry in Thomas Bewick’s cash book in October 1822 states that 'Dunn', evidently the son, was paid five shillings for a ‘job at pipes’. This son was still listed as a cabinet maker in trade directories up to 1855.
