= Joseph Turnbull =

- Born: 1725
- Died: 1775 (aged 49–50)
- Occupations: Piper, Innkeeper, Postmaster
- Instrument: Northumbrian smallpipes

Joseph Turnbull (c.1725 – 1775) was a player of the Northumbrian smallpipes, and the first, in 1756, to be appointed Piper to the Countess of Northumberland. He is the earliest player of the instrument of whom a portrait survives, in the collection at Alnwick Castle. There is a copy in the Morpeth Chantry Bagpipe Museum. In this portrait, he is wearing a blue coat, which is known to have been the uniform of the Alnwick Town Waits. From the creation of the dukedom in 1766, Turnbull was known as Piper to the Duchess. The portrait is labelled "Piper to the Duchess", so the caption postdates the creation of the Dukedom. However Turnbull was first appointed as the family's piper in 1756, and the portrait must be later than this.

== Early life ==
Little is known of Turnbull's early life. The crude estimate here of c. 1725 for his birth date is based on his apparent age in the portrait, made after his appointment as Piper to the Countess in 1756. However, he may be the Joseph Turnbull who married Elizabeth Charlton, at St. Nicholas' Church, on 4 May 1749; IGI estimates his birth year at about 1724, which is consistent with the apparent age of the piper.

== The Angel Inn ==
In October 1760, he started to work as an innkeeper, running The Angel Inn, a large coaching inn in the centre of Alnwick. In his advertisements, he described himself as a 'Late servant to the Right Honourable the Earl and Countess of Northumberland'. As he continued to be piper to the Countess, he seems to have been referring to some other, former, appointment in the Earl's household. The inn was large and respectable - on Saturday 11 July 1767, an auction of a farm was held at The Angel; on 2 February 1771, 'a company of gentlemen' celebrated the 21st birthday of Lord Algernon Percy at the Angel; and the inn was used as an office for the collection of rents. In October 1773, when the Assize Court was in session, the judges invited the Duke to dinner at the Angel one night; the following night he entertained them at Alnwick Castle Cockfights, then respectable and legal, were held in a pit behind the Angel - on one occasion for very substantial prizes of £25 and £50. In July 1771, an advertisement was placed, offering an adjacent property for sale, a 10-year lease on the inn itself, and the stock of the inn. For some reason, the business was being offered for sale as a going concern. However, Turnbull was able to continue the business; in an advertisement in 1772, addressed to 'The Nobility and Gentry, and others, travelling the Great North Road between London and Edinburgh', he contradicted a 'malicious report' that service at The Angel had declined, assuring readers that business was conducted as before. This gives a clear idea of the clientele he hoped to attract.

Another picture of the inn and its clientele is given by an incident in 1763, when a former employee broke into the Inn, stealing, from one of the guests, £67 in gold and two pairs of stockings, as well as two silver salt cellars belonging to the Inn. Turnbull pursued her all the way to North Shields, where she was captured boarding a ship. The inn thus attracted wealthy travellers, and it was important to the business for Turnbull to recover his guest's property.

== Postmaster at Alnwick ==
In 1768 he also became the postmaster at Alnwick. According to the later account of William Green, himself a piper to the Duke, during this time his uncle William Cant (1751–1821), also a piper, worked for Turnbull as postboy, and learned with him. Green also stated that Turnbull was the best piper in the region, and that John Peacock, then a teenager, studied the pipes with Turnbull around this time, having initially learned from Old William Lamshaw (1712–1796). As Green was born in the year Turnbull died, he cannot have known him directly, but he is likely to have reported accurately what he was told about him when young, particularly by his uncle William Cant. Turnbull would have still been a recent memory when Green was learning the pipes.

== Death ==
On 9 April 1775, "about eleven o'clock, as Mr Jos. Turnbull, post-master of Alnwick, and another gentleman, were returning from Heckley Grange, where they had been upon a visit, the gentleman in company with Mr. Turnbull alighted upon the road, and by some accident his horse got from him; Mr. Turnbull riding after, and endeavouring to stop the horse, fell off, fractured his skull and died on the spot." Having died suddenly, he was intestate; the administratrix of the estate was his widow Elizabeth. Tragically, on 12 April, one Sarah Ann Cranston Turnbull, the daughter of Joseph and Elizabeth, was christened. Given the date, it seems likely that Joseph had been celebrating the birth of his daughter when the accident happened.

He was succeeded as piper to the Duchess by Old William Lamshaw. The Angel was taken over on his death by John Dodd. That seems to have been a temporary arrangement, as the tenancy was offered again the following year; in that advertisement we are given a detailed description of the establishment, with 'two large Dining rooms, fifteen Fire-rooms, two exceeding good Cellars, a convenient Brew-house, and Brewing Utensils, stabling for over thirty Horses, a Chaise-house, a Garden, and other conveniences.'
