= Young William Lamshaw =

English piper

'Young' William Lamshaw (or Lambshaw) (1780 – 1806) was a player of the Northumbrian Smallpipes. Despite his early death, he was a significant figure in the history of the instrument, being appointed Piper to the Duchess of Northumberland at an early age, after the death of his grandfather Old William Lamshaw. He was active at a time when keys were being added to the instrument, and one of the most prominent early players of the improved instrument. Living in North Shields, it is very likely that he would have known Robert Reid, who had settled in the town in about 1802.

Birth records show that a "William Lambshaw" was born in Morpeth on 27 June 1780, and christened on 22 October. At the age of 12, in 1792, he was enlisted as a drummer in the 1st Northumberland Militia, however in 1797 records show he was 'sick, absent', and the following year, after being moved to a different company, he was discharged. His discharge may have been brought forward, so he could take up his late grandfather's post as piper to the Duchess, but he had already been sick the previous year, and died, very young, seven years later, so his illness may have been the main reason for his discharge. He died on 13 January 1806, still only 25, but already famous. His obituary was reprinted by Sykes 18 years later in Local records, or Historical register of remarkable events. It refers to him as This extraordinary performer on the improved small pipes.

The obituary further mentions him winning, at the age of eighteen, a piping competition held at the same time as the baronial court in Elsdon, which would have been about the end of September, 1798. This is corroborated by the biography of James Allan, another celebrated piper, which states that the judges had had difficulty reaching a decision, but that Allan, himself a competitor, conceded victory to Lamshaw, who was then eighteen, saying that the young man's fingers were much more supple, that he played with admirable distinctness and effect, and that he possessed the best bagpipe lug he had ever heard. Lamshaw's obituary concludes It is said, it was the intention of Earl Percy to have had him introduced to the theatres in the metropolis, but a consumption has put an early period to his mortal existence. The title Earl Percy refers to the heir of the Dukedom of Northumberland.

He played at various events in the next few years, such as the Tynemouth Fair, which was opened for the first time on 27 April 1804, with ...the duchess of Northumberland's own bagpiper, in his proper habiliments, mounted upon a white pony, and playing the favourite air of 'My Jockey stays lang at the Fair,' in the van …. After making another proclamation, the piper performed some northern airs in a style that would have done honour to Courtney, Gow, or Allan.

At the next Tynemouth Fair, on 2 November 1804, he appeared again: At eleven o’clock the Duke of Northumberland’s bailiff, accompanied by a vast concourse of neighbouring gentlemen and farmers, attended by the Duchess’s bagpiper, in proper uniform, proclaimed the fair in the usual way

He died, of consumption, in January, 1806, in Toll Street, North Shields; his father (also William) worked as a boatman for Richardson's brewery in the town, until his death in a work accident in 1817. In the record of his death, young William is recorded as having worked as a cooper, suggesting he too was employed by Richardson. In his obituary, he was described as 'an extraordinary performer on the improved small pipes', confirming that he played the newly introduced keyed instrument. Another notice of his death, published in Edinburgh, referred to him as "the most famous performer in all England upon the small pipes". Further, the use of the phrase 'improved small pipes', without further explanation, is used in a way as if it would be widely understood, suggesting that keyed instruments became fairly common very soon after their introduction around the turn of the century. William was buried in Christ Church, North Shields, with an elaborate headstone (since removed) paid for by 'a gentleman amateur', and a fulsome epitaph said to be by one William Richardson:

When first Omnipotence, with wise design,
Ordain’d our being, - great creation’s plan!
Fair Harmony he form’d, to shed benign
Her balmy comforts o’er the minds of man.

Soft-breathing melodies o’er charm the heart,
The virtuous heart, and genial warmth inspire;
Sounds, boldly sweet, still rapt’rous joys impart,
Impel to actions which the good admire.

Here rests the dust of one whose self-taught strains,
Northumbria charm’d, though short on earth his stay;
Yet Hope now prompts, that in celestial plains
He swells the chorus of the heav’nly lay.

Besides the long variation set Jockey stays lang at the Fair, which he played at Tynemouth, another tune associated with William, still commonly played, is now generally called Lamshaw's Fancy - however, in the Fenwick manuscript, this tune is called Lamshaw of North Shields' Fancy, associating it specifically with young William Lamshaw, rather than his grandfather, old William Lamshaw, who had lived in Morpeth. The range of the tune, from D to a, supports this, as it exceeds the single-octave compass of the unkeyed instrument; the keyed instrument had not been invented in old William Lamshaw's lifetime. One other piece is arguably a composition of Lamshaw's, a rant "Shields Fair", whose idiom is very suitable for keyed smallpipes, and whose compass, from D to g, suits the very earliest keyed instruments. As Lamshaw played in his official capacity at the inaugural Tynemouth and North Shields Fair, it would have made sense to compose a piece specifically for the occasion, exploiting the compass of the novel 4-keyed instrument.

Lamshaw was succeeded as piper to the Duchess by William Green.
