= Morpeth Chantry Bagpipe Museum =

Bagpipe museum in Morpeth, England

Coordinates: 55°10′01″N 1°41′13″W

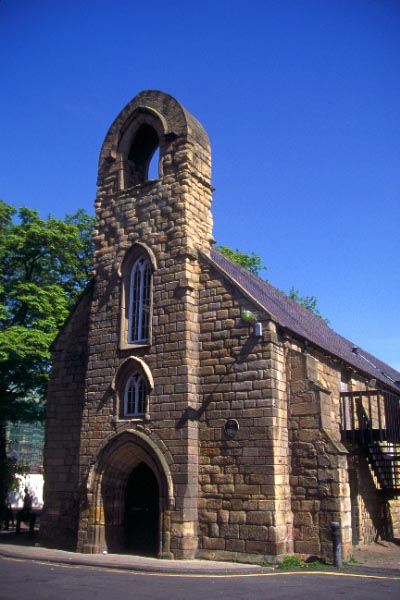
- Established: 1987
- Location: Morpeth Chantry, Morpeth, Northumberland, England
- Type: Music museum
- Website: Museums of Northumberland

The Morpeth Chantry Bagpipe Museum is located in Morpeth Chantry, Morpeth, Northumberland, England.

The museum, founded in 1987, contains a large collection of historic bagpipes, especially, but not exclusively, historic Northumbrian smallpipes and Border pipes, mainly based on the collection of William Alfred Cocks (1892-1971). The collection had initially been housed in the Black Gate, Newcastle upon Tyne, the home of the city's Society of Antiquaries. The collection also includes a large collection of bagpipe music, both in print and in manuscript, and Cocks's collection of photographs and press cuttings relating to bagpipes; many of these refer to the early years of the Northumbrian Pipers' Society. The current curator is Anne Moore.

The museum provides a venue for the regular meetings of the Northumbrian Pipers' Society. In September 2008, disastrous flooding in central Morpeth forced the successful evacuation of the entire collection. After extensive repairs and refurbishment, the Chantry was reopened the following year, with a visit by the Princess Royal.

== See also ==
- List of music museums
