= Doddington, Northumberland =

Coordinates: 55.5865°N 2.0049°W

Doddington
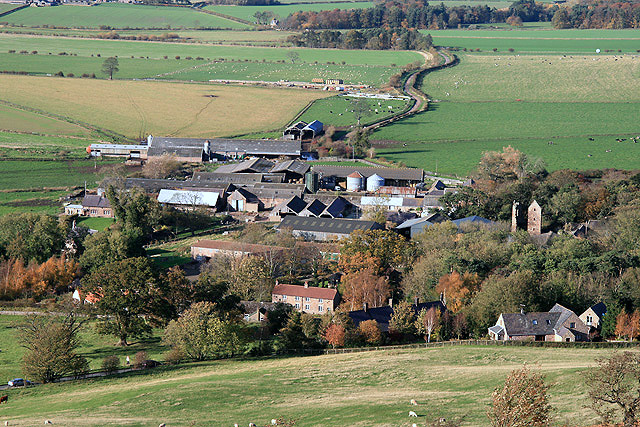

- Location within Northumberland
- Population: 195 (2011 census)
- OS grid reference: NT997325
- Unitary authority: Northumberland
- Ceremonial county: Northumberland
- Region: North East
- Country: England
- Sovereign state: United Kingdom
- Post town: WOOLER
- Postcode district: NE71
- Dialling code: 01668
- Police: Northumbria
- Fire: Northumberland
- Ambulance: North East
- UK Parliament: North Northumberland

The village and parish of Doddington are on the east side of the Milfield Plain, nearly 3 miles north of the town of Wooler, in the county of Northumberland, England. Notable buildings in Doddington include Doddington Hall and the Anglican church of St Mary and St Michael, which was built in the 18th century on the site of an original 12th-century place of worship. Wooler Golf Course is also near Doddington.

== Geography ==
The parish is bounded by the flat Milfield Plain to the west and two escarpments: Doddington Moor, adjacent to the village's east and Doddington North Moor, to the north beyond Fenton Wood. Falling within the Northumberland Sandstone Hills, Doddington Moor's highest peak is Dod Law at around 200 metres. The area is known for its abundance of archaeological sites.

== History and cultural significance ==
In 1734, the village was described in George Mark's Survey of a Portion of Northumberland as "remarkable for its largeness, the badness of its houses and low situation, and perhaps for the greatest quantities of geese of any in its neighbourhood". At about the same time, the tune Dorrington, also known as Dorrington Lads, was written down in the William Dixon manuscript. Having 14 strains, it is the most complex and elaborate of the pieces in that early source for Northumbrian music. The last tune played, on his deathbed, by the celebrated piper Will Allan, who died near Rothbury in 1779, was Dorrington Lads. A rhyme has survived, which fits the second strain of this tune:

Dorrington lads is bonny and Dorrington lads is canny
And I'll hae a Dorrington lad, and ride a Dorrington cuddy.

The tune survives in several versions besides that in the William Dixon manuscript; a five-strain version is found both in the Rook manuscript from near Carlisle, and in the Fenwick manuscript, where it is attributed to Robert Reid and ultimately to James Allan and his father Will. This version has much material that also appears in the Dixon version; two rather different versions adapted for Northumbrian smallpipes are found in the Robert Bewick manuscript, and the Lionel Winship manuscript; a further version is found in the manuscript collection of Tom Clough, starting with a variant of Dixon's second strain.

In The Denham Tracts, compiled in the mid-19th century, another rhyme about the streets of the village is found:

Southgate and Sandgate and up the Cat Raw,
The Tinkler's Street, and Byegate Ha'!

The Tinkler's Street was where itinerant hawkers sold their wares. This association with travellers is not surprising, as Doddington is quite close to Kirk Yetholm, the main base of the Border Gypsies.

== Demography ==
The 2001 UK Census shows a population of 146, with a 50:50 male:female split.

== Economy ==
Besides farming, there was formerly a sandstone quarry in the area which closed in 1969, and coal mines. A well-known business currently in Doddington is the Doddington Dairy farm, a producer of organic cheeses and ice creams.

== Sources ==
- White, John Talbot (1973). The Scottish Border and Northumberland. London: Eyre Metheun. ISBN 0 413 30270 9.
