= Rook manuscript =

The Rook manuscript, a music manuscript compiled by John Rook, of Waverton, Cumbria in 1840, is "A Collection of English, Scotch, Irish and Welsh tunes, containing upwards of 1260 airs". These include many tunes, or versions of tunes, not found elsewhere. It is a particularly valuable resource for the study of the traditional music of Northern England, and specifically of music for the Northumbrian Smallpipes.

== John Rook ==
An edition of the manuscript edited by Rob Say has recently been published. This includes transcriptions of all the music, as well as much that has been learned about the compiler, his life and work.

The extended Rook family came from Waverton in Cumberland. Joseph Rook, a surveyor, was born in 1750, and is known to have played the violin and other instruments. His son John, also a surveyor, moved to North Shields, then in Northumberland in about 1804. His son John, the compiler of the manuscript, was born there in 1806.

John worked with his father working as a surveyor, and as a painter and music teacher. He married in 1827. North Shields was the home of Robert Reid, the inventor of the modern form of the Northumbrian smallpipes, and John was certainly a keen player of the smallpipes by 1833. It is very likely that John learned the instrument from Reid. This is supported by musical evidence - some versions of tunes in the manuscript, particularly Dorrington Lads, are known to have been played by that family. There is also pictorial evidence - the frontispiece of the manuscript includes a drawing of several musical instruments, prominently including a set of smallpipes similar to a Reid set.

In 1833, following the death of John's grandfather Joseph, the family moved to Aikbank, a farm near Wigton in Cumberland. His diary for this year survives; as well as running the farm, John also refers to painting and giving lessons. Many of the 1833 diary entries refer to him playing music, mostly on the smallpipes. Aikbank is on the line of the Maryport and Carlisle Railway, which was constructed in the early 1840s; in 1841 Rook and his family moved to Whitehaven, where in 1844, he started working as Art Master at nearby St. Bees School near Whitehaven. Later he appears in trade directories for Whitehaven as a painter and illustrator, as well as a Teacher and Professor of Music. In 1857 he became headmaster of a school in Cleator Moor, an industrial town near Whitehaven. He died in Whitehaven in 1872.

== The manuscript ==
The location of the original manuscript was unknown until very recently, however a scanned photocopy, lacking one page, is online. The title reads MULTUM IN PARVO, or a Collection of old English, Scottish, Irish and Welsh tunes, for the... (there is then an illustration of various musical instruments, a fiddle, Northumbrian pipes, a trumpet, an accordion, a flute and a piccolo) ... containing upwards of 1260 airs, selected by John Rook, Waverton. Written by the selecter for his amusement on the above instruments, 1840. A note at the bottom of the illustration reads 'not to be lent on any account'. The selection of tunes is both wide and varied, and gives a detailed picture of the repertoire of a knowledgeable musician, who seems to have had access to an extensive collection of sources. While many of the tunes are common in printed and manuscript collections of the time, a significant number are, as the title page says, 'old'. They include a significant number of long variation sets, many dateable to the previous century. Most of the tunes in the early part of the manuscript, numbering several hundred, are marked with the letter "G", apparently referring to his grandfather Joseph, also a musician. In October 2022, the original manuscript was offered for sale, and it is expected that a high-resolution scan will shortly be made available by the purchaser.

== Northumbrian tunes ==
It is clear from the title page that Rook played the Northumbrian pipes. Many of his Northumbrian pipe tunes are close to the versions in Peacock's Collection from about 1800, but often differing in details. One, The Bonny Pit Lad, is identical to, and probably derives from, a version published by Abraham Mackintosh early in the 19th century. Two tunes, Paddy O'Rafferty and Horse and away to Newmarket correspond to parts of the versions in the Lionel Winship manuscript, from Wark, in North Tynedale, suggesting that both compilers learned them from the same source. Other tunes, including Dorrington Lads, and Cut and Dry Dolly, are in versions not found in print. Dorrington Lads, in 5 strains, is similar to the larger version in the William Dixon manuscript, of 1733, and identical to a version found in the later 19th century Fenwick manuscript, where it is stated to be the version from the Reid family. Cut and Dry Dolly, while broadly similar to Peacock's version, has a range going higher than the single octave compass of the unkeyed smallpipe chanter, and an extra strain not found in Peacock; two very similar versions are found in a manuscript compiled by the Ancient Melodies Committee of the Society of Antiquaries of Newcastle upon Tyne it is known that James Reid and his sister Elizabeth Oliver were two of the informants when the Committee was collecting the music. It seems very probable that Rook learned some music directly from the Reids when he lived in North Shields.

Another tune, called Captain Fenwick here, Sir John Fenwick's the Flower amang them in Northumberland, and Mary Scott, the Flower of Yarrow in Scotland, appears in a 7-strain version, again with notes beyond the single octave compass of the unkeyed pipes; the same version also appears in the Antiquaries' manuscript, as well as a manuscript of tunes compiled in 1872 by the Northumbrian artist Joseph Crawhall II, while its first 4 strains appear in the somewhat earlier Robert Bewick manuscript. It thus seems that an older single octave 4-strain version which was known to Bewick, was elaborated before 1840 by some other piper, possibly one of the Reid family, to use the extra compass of the keyed chanter. As Robert Reid was the principal developer of the modern keyed instrument, it would have made sense for him or his children, pipers themselves, to compose extra strains to existing pipe music exploiting the instrument's increased range. An alternative reading is that this version is older, originally to be played on Border pipes - it would require two notes above the instrument's normal range, but on some instruments, these could be played by overblowing.

== Cumbrian and West Border tunes ==
Some tunes are local to Cumberland and the West Border region, indeed the first tune in the book is Canny Cummerlin. The slow 6/8 march Squire Dacre's, often called Noble Squire Dacre elsewhere, commemorates a local noble family; having 4 strains, rather than the two found in the Northumbrian Minstrelsy, it is the most elaborate version known, though similar to a three-strain version in Riddell's Scotch, Galwegian and Border Tunes, from Moffat, a little north of the Border. There is also an early version of John Peel, marked, unlike most tunes in the book, 'from memory'. As it is close in date to the tune's composition - Peel was still alive in 1840 - and somewhat different from the substantially reworked version published in 1866, this version is of interest. Rook also includes a Scottish tune, from which the song air was adapted: Where wad Bonnie Annie lie? Rook evidently regarded the tunes as distinct enough to include both. The fact that John Peel is marked "from memory", suggests that the other tunes were taken predominantly from printed or manuscript copies, which is corroborated by the closeness of some of them to known earlier versions.

== Scottish tunes ==
Besides many dance tunes found in collections from the end of the 18th century, such as those of Niel Gow, and Aird, the manuscript also includes a significant number of earlier 18th-century tunes. Among these are a variation set on Lasses likes nae Brandy, deriving indirectly from a composition by David Young, in the Macfarlane manuscript, probably via a later printed collection by McLean - the following tune, a minuet, is attributed to McLean; a variation set on Further Benn the Welcomer, deriving from a version in Flores Musicae, or The Scots Musician, published in 1773, of which a copy is in the Wighton Collection at the University of Dundee; and a tune here called Nea Good Luck, but generally known as Up and war them all Willie, a version deriving from Oswald's Caledonian Pocket Companion of about 1750. Rook's title may derive from the fact that this tune, and the song in 6/8 time, Nae Good Luck, use the same passamezzo moderno ground bass. Versions of Alloway House, The Deukes dang ower my Daddie are also taken from Oswald. as well as Love is the Cause of my Mourning. It thus seems that Rook had access to either a printed copy of the Caledonian Pocket Companion, or good manuscript copies of tunes from it.
