= Cornelius Stanton =

Cornelius Stanton (1799–1866) was a Northumbrian piper.

== Life ==
Stanton was born in Gateshead in 1799. In 1841, he was recorded in the census as living in Newcastle, in Cumberland Row, Westgate Road, where he lived until his father's death in 1853. Stanton then moved to Tynemouth, where he stayed until his death in 1866.

== Musical significance ==
Stanton is a figure of importance in the history of the Northumbrian smallpipe's instrument repertoire.

In 1858, William Kell, of the Ancient Melodies Committee set up by the Newcastle Society of Antiquaries, noted that Stanton owned the printed tunebook of John Peacock. This book was published sometime around 1800, and was one of only four surviving copies of its kind. At the Committee's launch, Kell addressed the Duke of Northumberland, the patron of the Society, and specifically thanked Stanton. Stanton also had a significant collection of music manuscripts, some of which are now bound in the Fenwick manuscript, while two manuscript books belonged to the late Lance Robson, who distributed transcripts throughout the Northumbrian Musical Heritage Society. Together, these two groups of papers give a picture of an able and enthusiastic amateur piper in the mid-19th century.

In addition to local pieces, including variation sets from Peacock's collection and popular Tyneside songs, Stanton played many Scots and Irish tunes, as well as popular songs and dance tunes of the day. Some nursery rhymes are included, perhaps for the benefit of a young pupil. One variation set on Sir John Fenwick's "The Flower Among Them All", needing a keyed chanter, corresponds to that found in the Rook manuscript, and may derive from the Reid family, who lived nearby in North Shields; another tune in Stanton's hand "Shew's the Way to Wallington", is identical to a version in the Fenwick manuscript, there stated to be James Reid's copy. Scans of two of the Stanton pages in the Fenwick manuscript are on a WordPress site titled "Northumberland Small-Piping in North Shields". These are for unkeyed and keyed chanter respectively. These tunes are in relatively simple versions, suitable for someone learning the instrument, suggesting that Fenwick studied the instrument with Stanton. Two of Stanton's tunes in Fenwick, "Little wot ye wha's coming" and "Blackett of Wylam", were explicitly attributed to Peacock by him, although they are not in Peacock's printed tunebook. These tunes appear in the manuscripts of Peacock's pupil Robert Bewick, so the attribution is very credible. In 1881, John Stokoe, one of the editors of the Northumbrian Minstrelsy, referred to some of Stanton's manuscripts, then in the possession of the piper T. Errington Thompson, of Sewing Shields. He described Stanton as "an amateur performer on the small pipes, and an ardent lover of their music." The Minstrelsy and, in this article, Stokoe printed the tune "Follow Her Over the Border", taken from these manuscripts.

Stanton had an unusual, perhaps unique, set of smallpipes made with 6 drones rather than 4 or 5, which was assembled by James Reid using parts made by his father Robert. Having 6 drones made it easier to change keys while playing. A picture of this set was used as the frontispiece of James Fenwick's "Instruction Book for the Northumbrian Smallpipes", published in 1896.
