= Lady Dorothea Ruggles-Brise =

Expert in and collector of Scottish traditional music

Dorothea Ruggles-Brise
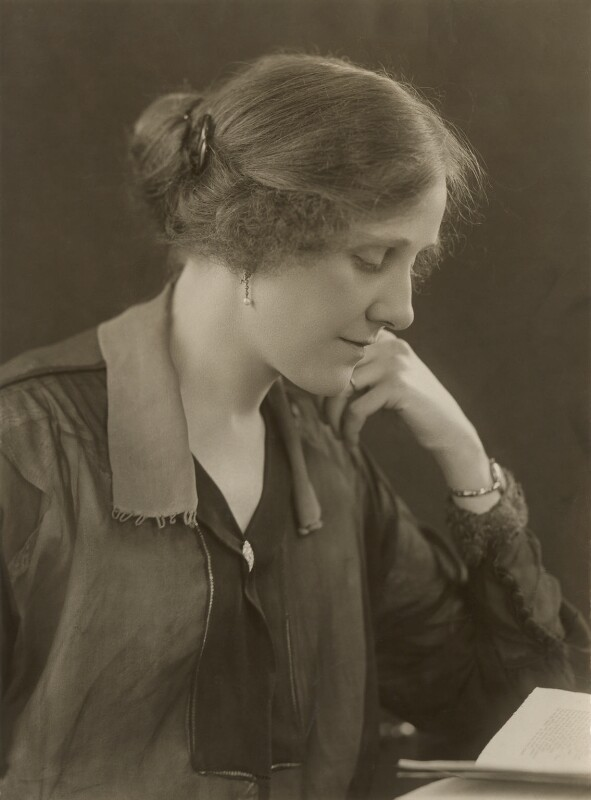
- Dorothea Ruggles-Brise in 1921
- Born: Lady Dorothea Louisa Stewart-Murray; 25 March 1866
- Died: 28 December 1937 (aged 71)
- Occupation: Music collector
- Spouse: Harold Goodeve Ruggles-Brise (m. 1895; died 1927)
- Parent(s): John Stewart-Murray, 7th Duke of Atholl; Louisa Moncreiffe

Lady Dorothea Louisa Ruggles-Brise (née Stewart-Murray; 25 March 1866 – 28 December 1937), was the daughter of the 7th Duke of Atholl. She was an expert in and collector of Scottish traditional music.

== Life ==
Lady Dorothea Louisa Stewart-Murray was born in 1866 to John Stewart-Murray, 7th Duke of Atholl, and his wife, Louisa Moncrieff (daughter of Sir Thomas Moncreiffe, 7th Baronet). Her family had been the patrons of Niel Gow, the great Scottish fiddler, composer and music publisher, and she grew up with a lifelong interest in, and later became a great authority on, and collector of, Scottish traditional music. Even in her youth, she had started to compile a collection of little-known Scottish melodies, and would perform these herself.

In 1895, she married Harold Goodeve Ruggles-Brise, an officer in the Grenadier Guards, and lived with him in London. A photograph of her, dated the year before this, is in the National Trust Collection at Polesden Lacey. A 6/8 pipe march commemorating her wedding was composed by Aeneas Rose, pipe-major of the Atholl Highlanders. She continued her interest in Scottish music, with a particular interest in its history. In 1904, after the death of John Glen, an Edinburgh music publisher, she acquired his extensive music collection, and placed it on loan with the British Museum. This collection is now permanently housed in the National Library of Scotland, to whom she gave it in memory of her younger brother, Lord George Stewart-Murray, who had been killed in action with the Black Watch in France in 1914. It contains some 900 items, bound in 412 volumes, including 6 manuscripts. Many of the items of this collection have been digitised.

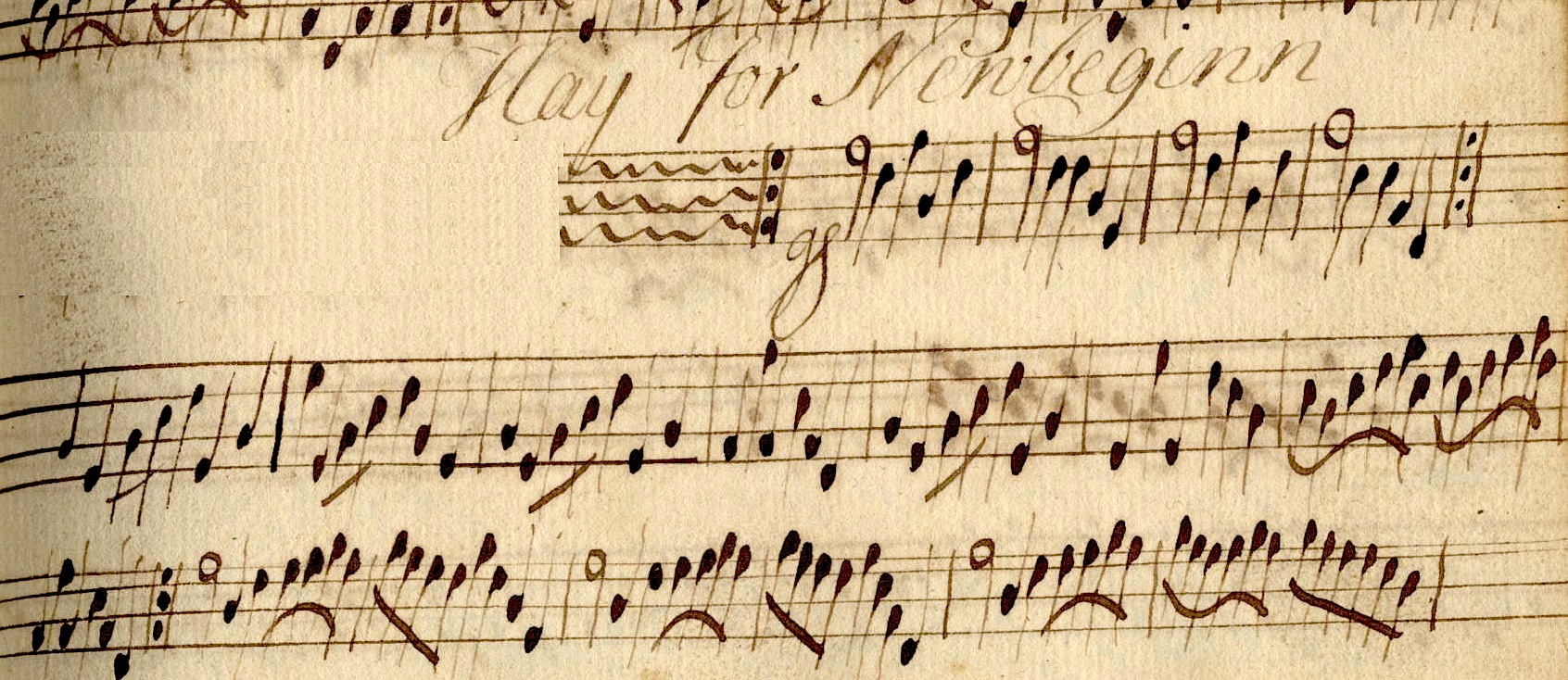
Example of the music by William Dixon which she saved - modern facsimile

She also built an extensive music collection of her own, which included the important William Dixon manuscript, the earliest source of bagpipe music from the British Isles, and the most extensive source of Border pipe music from the 18th century. This manuscript is slightly scorched; when she offered to buy it from its previous owner, Charles Macintosh of Inver, he refused to sell it to her, insisting she take it instead as a gift. When she demurred, he put it on the fire to force her to accept it. This, along with the rest of her personal collection, some 600 volumes, is now known as the Atholl Collection, and housed in the A.K. Bell Library in Perth. A catalogue of all the music in the collection is available.
