= Evelyn Murray =

Evelyn Murray may refer to:

- Zainab Cobbold (1867–1963), born Lady Evelyn Murray, Scottish diarist, traveller and noblewoman
- Evelyn Murray (civil servant) (1880–1947), English civil servant
- Lady Evelyn Stewart Murray (1868–1940), Scottish folklorist
