= Charles Macintosh (composer and naturalist) =

Scottish composer and naturalist

Charles Macintosh (1839–1922), known as 'the Perthshire Naturalist', was a musician and self-taught amateur naturalist from Inver, near Dunkeld, Perthshire, Scotland. He, with his younger brother James, who was a fiddler and himself a composer, represented the third generation of an important musical family in the area. Their grandfather, James (1791–1876), had learned fiddle from Niel Gow, who also lived in Inver.

Macintosh spent nearly all his life in the small cottage in Inver where he was born, only moving in with his brother in Dunkeld for the last few months of his life. He worked as a postman, after losing the fingers of his left hand in an accident at a sawmill when young. This disability stopped him playing the fiddle, but he was able to play the cello, stopping the strings with the edge of his hand. He was also precentor in the local Free Church, as his father, Charles Sr, had been before him. He was also superintendent of the Sunday School. He composed several dance tunes, including the strathspey "The Auld Boat of Logierait," and a reel, "Miss Murray Threipland of Fingask". He had a collection of old tune books, including the William Dixon manuscript, which he gave to Dorothea Ruggles–Brise in 1909. This, dating from 1733, is the oldest collection of bagpipe music from the British Isles, and the most extensive source known of music for the Border pipes.

He was a keen amateur naturalist, with a particular interest in fungi, and was an active associate member of the Perthshire Society of Natural Science; he could not afford the greater cost of ordinary membership. This Society published The Flora of Perthshire, by Francis Buchanan White, in 1898, using records provided by members, including Macintosh. He identified 13 species of fungi previously unknown in the British Isles, four of them new to science. He shared this interest with Beatrix Potter, who had often visited the area since she was a child, and they exchanged specimens and drawings. He left his collection of specimens, together with some botanical illustrations by Potter, to Perth Museum.

He died in 1922, at the age of 82, and is buried in Little Dunkeld Churchyard, Birnam. The two books by Henry Coates―Charlie Macintosh: post-runner, naturalist and musician and A Perthshire naturalist: Charles Macintosh of Inver―commemorate his life and work. The latter includes a chapter on Scottish traditional music, including several of Macintosh's compositions.
