= John Stewart-Murray =

John Stewart-Murray may refer to:

- John Stewart-Murray, 8th Duke of Atholl, British soldier and Unionist politician
- John Stewart-Murray, 7th Duke of Atholl, Scottish peer
