= Harold Ruggles-Brise =

British Army officer

Major-General Sir Harold Ruggles-Brise KCMG CB MVO
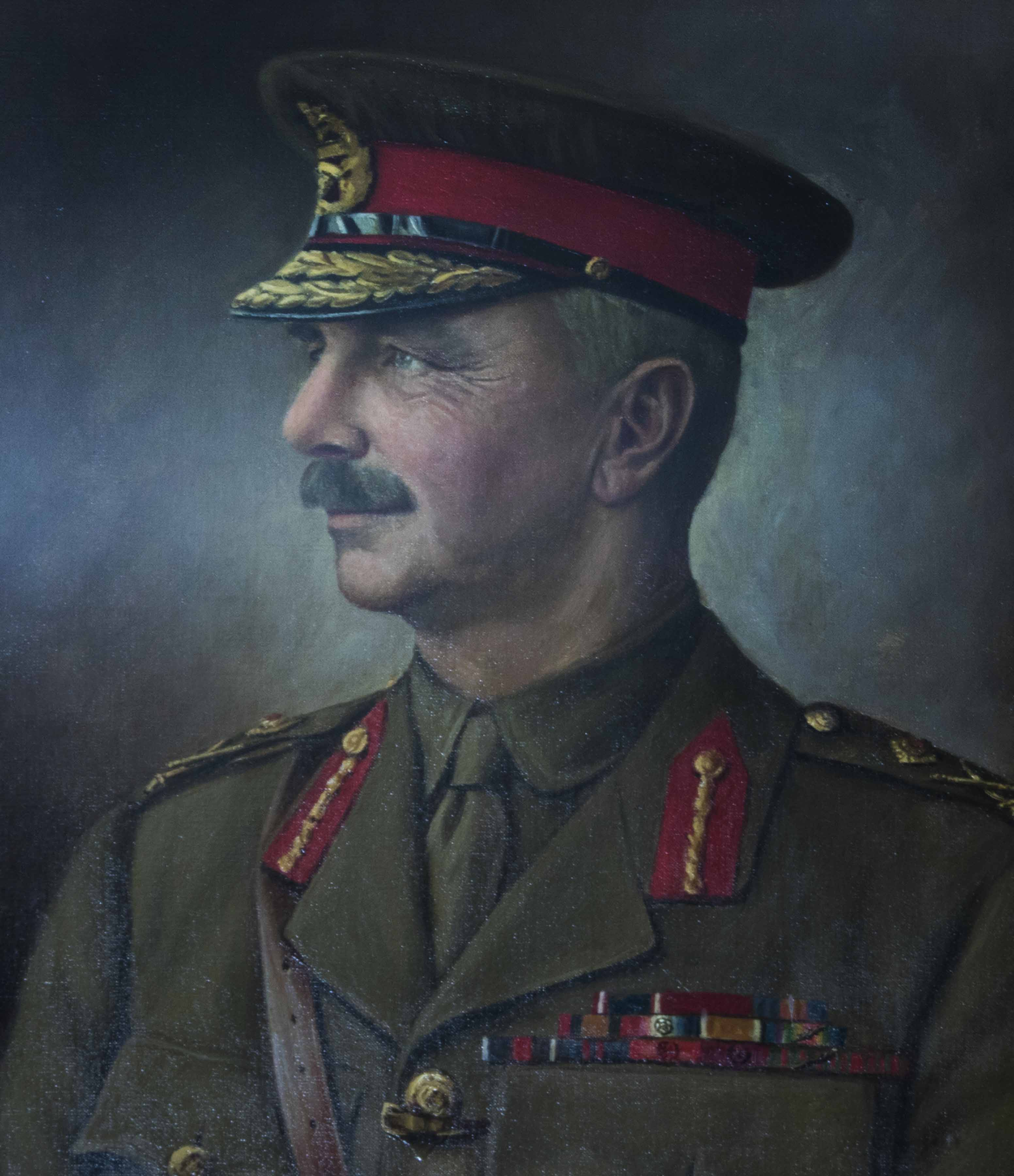
- Born: 17 March 1864; Spains Hall, Essex, England
- Died: 24 June 1927 (aged 63)
- Relatives: Sir Samuel Ruggles-Brise (father); Sir Evelyn Ruggles-Brise (brother)
- Military career
- Allegiance: United Kingdom
- Branch: British Army
- Service years: 1885–1920
- Rank: Major-General
- Unit: Grenadier Guards
- Commands: 73rd Division (1917–1918); 40th Division (1915–1917); 20th Infantry Brigade (1914); School of Musketry (1911–1914); 3rd Battalion, Grenadier Guards (1907–1911)
- Conflicts: Second Boer War; First World War
- Awards: Knight Commander of the Order of St Michael and St George; Companion of the Order of the Bath; Member of the Royal Victorian Order; Mentioned in Despatches (10); Commander of the Order of Leopold (Belgium); Commander of the Legion of Honour (France); Croix de Guerre (France); Mentioned in dispatches
- Other work: Secretary, Officers' Association

Major-General Sir Harold Goodeve Ruggles-Brise KCMG CB MVO (17 March 1864 – 24 June 1927) was a British Army officer in the Second Boer War and First World War, and an amateur cricketer.

== Early life ==
Harold Ruggles-Brise was born in Essex in Spains Hall, Finchingfield on 17 March 1864, the fifth son of Sir Samuel Brise Ruggles-Brise, of Spains Hall, Essex, and his wife Marianne Weyland Bowyer-Smith, daughter of Sir Edward Bowyer-Smith, 10th Baronet, of Hill Hall, Essex. His eldest brothers were Archie (who inherited Spains Hall) and Evelyn (later Sir Evelyn Ruggles-Brise, chairman of the Prison Commission). Unlike his elder brothers who went to Eton College, Harold was educated at Winchester College, where he was in the Rev J. T. Bramston's House, and where he "thrived at the school, becoming head of his house and Captain of the 1st XI, known as 'Lords', in 1882", and at Balliol College, Oxford. At Oxford, Ruggles-Brise obtained a Second Class in Classical Moderations, "long regarded as one of the hardest examinations in the world", and his cricket Blue in 1883.

== Early military career ==
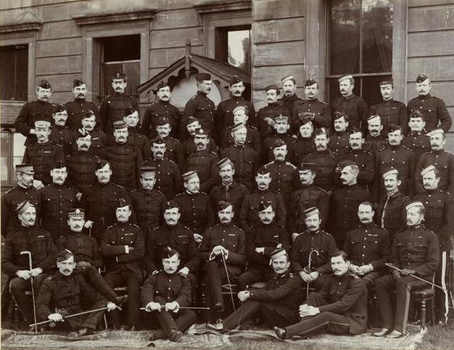
Officers, many of whom later became generals, at the Staff College, Camberley, in 1897. Lieutenant/Captain Ruggles-Brise is stood in the third row, fourth from the right.

After Oxford, Ruggles-Brise, having "long aspired to a military career", entered the Royal Military College, Sandhurst in 1884, passing out in 1885, and was commissioned as a lieutenant in the Grenadier Guards in May 1885. After serving with the 2nd Battalion of his regiment, first at Chelsea Barracks, then from October 1886 at Richmond Barracks in Dublin, he served with the battalion, becoming the adjutant of the 3rd Battalion, Grenadier Guards, from 1893–94, and as adjutant of the Guards Depot at Caterham in 1895.

He then studied at the Staff College, Camberley, from 1897 to 1898, earning his psc. His fellow students there included many men who would later rise to prominence in the next few decades, the most notable among them being the future field marshal, "Wully" Robertson, George Barrow and Archibald Murray, both full generals, Herbert Holman a lieutenant general, while Henry Joseph Everett, Colin Mackenzie and Oliver Nugent would all retire as major generals and Frederick Lionel Banon, Reginald Oxley and Harry Dupré Tuson as brigadier generals.

== Second Boer War ==
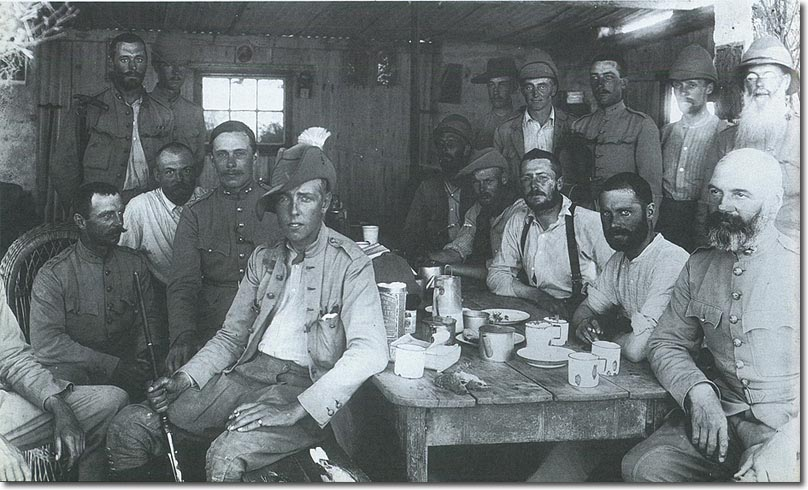
Officers of the 3rd Battalion, Grenadier Guards, in their mess at Modder River, South Africa, 1900. Captain Ruggles-Brise is sat on the far left, facing away from the camera.

Promoted to captain in October 1897, Ruggles-Brise served with the 2nd Battalion, Grenadier Guards at Gibraltar before being appointed brigade major to the infantry brigade at Gibraltar in March 1899. In October that year he and his brigadier, Sir Henry Colville, were transferred to Cape Colony as part of the troop build-up for the Second Boer War. This war would be "Harold's first 'hands-on' experience of the battlefield and command in wartime", with his time in South Africa going on to "shape his development as a soldier, and ultimately forge him into the caring and courageous leader of men in the Great War. Colville took command of the 1st (Guards) Brigade in Major-General Lord Methuen's 1st Division, with Ruggles-Brise as his brigade major.

Advancing to relieve Kimberley at the beginning of the war, Methuen attempted a night attack at Belmont on 22/23 November 1899. He sent Colville off with his brigade to assault Gun Hill: although 'They were guided by my Brigade Major, Captain Ruggles-Brise, who led them to the exact spot', Colville admitted that he had miscalculated the distance, and that the commanding officer (CO) of the 3rd Grenadier Guards attacked the wrong hill. Neither error was Ruggles-Brise's fault and he received his first mention in dispatches for his work that night. He distinguished himself again at the Battle of Modder River and was present at the Battle of Magersfontein.

When Colville was promoted to command the 9th Division, Ruggles-Brise went with him as his deputy assistant adjutant general (DAAG). However, in May 1900, while Lord Roberts was closing in on Johannesburg, a yeomanry battalion under Colville's command was cut off and forced to surrender, Colville was made a scapegoat and sent home. Ruggles-Brise remained in South Africa until the end of the year, when he was re-appointed as a brigade major in Home District (London).

== Interwar years ==
Ruggles-Brise was promoted to the brevet rank of major on 9 November 1900, and became a regimental major by seniority on 11 October 1902. On 1 April 1903 he became brigade major of the Brigade of Guards, and simultaneously of the 9th Infantry Brigade.

Promoted to lieutenant colonel on 20 July 1907, Ruggles-Brise became commanding officer (CO) of the 3rd Battalion, Grenadier Guards, taking over from Lieutenant Colonel Sir Charles Fergusson, which he commanded for the next four years. The battalion was initially stationed at Victoria Barracks, Windsor.

After completing this term he was then briefly placed on half-pay. Having turned down a job as an instructor at the Staff College, and having been promoted to colonel on 30 August 1911, he was next appointed commandant of the School of Musketry at Hythe in Kent, in succession to Colonel Walter Congreve, a Victoria Cross (VC) recipient who had been a contemporary at Sandhurst many years before.

The importance of this command should not be underestimated for musketry tactics were synonymous; Hythe was both author and implementer of the doctrine and training needed to prepare the British infantry for the modern battlefield. Arguably Harold assumed one of the most important roles in the British Army.

In 1909 the School of Musketry had advocated that each British infantry battalion should be equipped with six instead of two machine-guns. This had been turned down on grounds of cost, so the decision had been made to train the infantry in rapid-fire musketry to make up for the lack of automatic weapons.

During Ruggles-Brises's command the school played a crucial role in training the instructors who in turn taught the British Regular Army to shoot so effectively that in the early part of the First World War German reports repeatedly credited them with possessing large numbers of machine guns. Conversely, Ruggles-Brise has been criticised for delaying the development of anti-aircraft machine-guns in 1912.

== First World War ==
=== Brigade commander ===
Soon after the outbreak of the First World War, Ruggles-Brise was promoted to temporary brigadier general (15 September) to command a brigade composed of the last three infantry battalions of the Regular Army left in Britain after the British Expeditionary Force (BEF) went to France. They constituted the 20th Infantry Brigade which, together with the 21st and 22nd infantry brigades and supporting units, formed part of the 7th Division, commanded by Major General Thompson Capper, and assembled at Lyndhurst, Hampshire. Although not officially designated a Guards brigade, it contained two Guards battalions (1st Grenadiers along with the 2nd Scots Guards, together with the 2nd Border Regiment; it was joined by the 2nd Gordon Highlanders, which returned from Cairo just before the brigade sailed from Southampton).

The 7th Division landed at Zeebrugge on 7 October 1914, intended to assist the Belgian Army in the defence of Antwerp. In the event all it could do was help to cover the Belgian retreat and then take up defensive positions at Ypres where they were joined by the rest of the BEF after the race to the Sea. Thereafter the 20th Brigade was engaged in heavy fighting at Langemarck and Gheluvelt during the First Battle of Ypres. Like several other senior officers who got out among their units to exercise personal command during this confused fighting, Ruggles-Brise was wounded, having "sustained dreadful wounds to both arms and his shoulder blade and was stretchered back half dead, leaving Major Cator in command. In hindsight maybe he was lucky for his Irish Guards contemporary, Brigadier-General Charles FitzClarence VC, was killed outright nine days later when leading the 1st Guards Brigade in a counterattack at Veldhock". He was carried back 'half dead of a dreadful wound on a stretcher' on 2 November.

=== Home service in England ===
During his lengthy convalescence in England he reverted to his substantive rank of colonel and the half-pay list, but after returning to active duty in July 1915 he was once again made a temporary brigadier general and appointed brigadier general, general staff (BGGS), at the Aldershot Training Centre, taking over from Brigadier General Cameron Shute.

On 14 September, while still in this role, Ruggles-Brise received a letter from Lieutenant General Sir Archibald Murray, soon to be appointed as the chief of the Imperial General Staff (CIGS) and formerly a fellow student at the Staff College almost twenty years earlier. Murray, in his letter, wrote to his former Camberley classmate: "I want to get you a Division. Are you practically fit now or is it 'light duties' only?" On 21 September Ruggles-Brise "went up before my medical board and I think they passed me fit for general service" but, he believed, "that does not mean I shall go abroad. They thought I had made a wonderful recovery". Of the possibility of his receiving a division, he believed "it is too good to be true".

=== The Bantams ===
On 25 September 1915, having been "passed fit for general service", Ruggles-Brise was promoted to the temporary rank of major general and appointed to command the 40th Division as its first general officer commanding (GOC). This was a new formation, the second last of Field Marshal Lord Kitchener's 'New Army' divisions, and by the time it was organised the flow of volunteers had slackened and the army had to reduce its height requirement for infantry in an effort to attract recruits. This led to the creation of so-called 'bantam' battalions of smaller men. The 40th Division's 119th Infantry Brigade was the Welsh Bantam Brigade composed of 'well-knit, hardy Welshmen', but 'the men of the other two brigades (120th and 121st) contained a large proportion of under-developed and unfit men, and a drastic weeding-out became necessary'. 'It was estimated that only two serviceable battalions could be formed from the existing four in each brigade, consequently the 120th and 121st brigades would each require two new battalions to complete it to war establishment. Early in 1916 Ruggles-Brise recommended that four new battalions should be sent, to prevent the departure of the division overseas being indefinitely postponed. The four battalions of the 118th Infantry Brigade, part of the 39th Division, were transferred to complete his brigades. The reorganisation was completed in February 1916 and the division, by now "said to be half English, one third Welsh and one sixth Scottish" due to its new composition, was fully mobilised by the end of May.

The 40th Division under Ruggles-Brise embarked for France in late May and early June and took its place on the Western Front to join in the continuous trench warfare. One of his three brigades assisted another division in the Battle of the Ancre (the last phase of the Battle of the Somme) in November 1916, and the division followed up the German retreat to the Hindenburg Line in March 1917, but the whole division's first offensive actions came in April and May 1917. On 21, 24 and 25 April, the 40th Division captured 'Fifteen Ravine' (a valley originally bordered by 15 distinctive trees), Villers-Plouich and Beaucamp. Today, Fifteen Ravine British Cemetery stands in Farm Ravine, which was captured by the 12th (Service) Battalion, South Wales Borderers, while Villers-Plouich was captured by the 13th (Service) Battalion, East Surrey Regiment.

=== Home defence ===
On 24 August, Ruggles-Brise, who was promoted to substantive major general for "distinguished service in the field" on 3 June, was rather suddenly removed from command of his 40th Division and Major General John Ponsonby of the Coldstream Guards assumed command in his place. This was likely due to Field Marshal Sir Douglas Haig's dissatisfaction with the division's performance several months earlier. On 24 April Haig, commander-in-chief (C-in-C) of the BEF on the Western Front, had recorded in his diary that the 40th was a "poor division under Major-General Sir Harold Ruggles-Brise." The latter's removal was part of a wider purge of divisional GOC's that month who were deemed to be either fatigued or inefficient as, in addition to Ruggles-Brise, Major General Gerald Cuthbert of the 39th Division and Major General Charles Ross of the 6th Division were also relieved of their commands at roughly the same time and reassigned.

He then returned to England to take over command of the 73rd Division, a home defence formation stationed in Essex. Originally composed of men of the Territorial Force (TF) who had not volunteered for (or were unfit for) overseas service, this distinction had been swept away by the Military Service Act 1916, and the division's role had changed to fitness training to prepare these former home service men for drafting to fighting divisions. Towards the end of 1917 the War Office decided to disband the home service divisions, and the 73rd Division was progressively broken up between January and March 1918. Ruggles-Brise relinquished his command on 4 March.

=== Haig's right-hand man ===
His next posting was as military secretary at the general headquarters (GHQ) of the British Expeditionary Force under the BEF's commander-in-chief (C-in-C), Field Marshal Sir Douglas Haig. After harsh criticism of GHQ's performance during the 1917 fighting, several of Haig's senior staff had been replaced by new men like Ruggles-Brise brought in. The military secretary was one of the C-in-C's closest assistants with particular responsibility for promotions and appointments. Ruggles-Brise arrived to take over from Lieutenant General Sir William Peyton in the middle of the German spring offensive of March 1918, and one of his first jobs was to inform the commander of the BEF's Fifth Army, General Sir Hubert Gough – in the midst of organising a counter-attack – that he was being replaced. Gough later recalled:

Not having an idea of what he had come to see me about, I dat him down to some tea. He then asked to see me alone and told me as nicely as he could that the 'Chief' thought that I and my staff must be very tired, so he had decided to put Rawlinson and the staff of the Fourth Army to take command. I was very surprised and I suppose I was very hurt, but beyond saying 'All right', I only asked when Rawlinson would be coming to take over.

== Retirement ==
Ruggles-Brise continued as Haig's military secretary throughout the German offensives and then the Allies' victorious Hundred Days Offensive of 1918, which ultimately led to the Armistice of 11 November 1918 and an end to the war. Of the end of the war he wrote on the day of the armistice:

We heard last night that the Boche is going to accept our terms. I think and hope thatit is alright - so the war is over. Of course, I do not know in the least what is going to happen, but it is an enormous relief to think that there will be no more fighting and we must be more than thankful that everything has come out alright in the end. At times it has been a narrow shave, but we have luckily pulled through. All I look forward to now is living in a little housey with my precious mum.

He finally relinquished the position on 13 April 1919. He then worked in the military secretary's department in England until 3 September. The day after that, he received "some disappointing news from the War Office". It referred to Ruggles-Brise's "claim to a wound pension" which were "carefully considered, but as the effects of your wounds are not now regarded as very severe you are not entitled under Section X of the Pay warrant to a wound pension".

Towards the end of January 1920 he received another War Office letter, which informed him "that the Army Council had almost completed selection of Major-Generals" and had concluded that "there was no possibility of offering him any further employment before the date on which his retirement became compulsory". He therefore retired from the army, after thirty-five years of service, on 10 March 1920, quite possibly with "mixed emotions".

In retirement he devoted himself to soldiers' welfare, and was secretary of the Officers' Association.

== Honours and awards ==
Ruggles-Brise had been mentioned in despatches five times during the Second Boer War. As CO of the 3rd Battalion, Grenadier Guards, he was made a Member of the Royal Victorian Order (MVO) – a personal award by the King. After his active service in 1914 he was made a Companion of the Order of the Bath (CB) in February 1915. During the First World War he was mentioned in despatches five more times, and afterwards was made a Knight Commander of the Order of St Michael and St George (KCMG) in the King's Birthday Honours of June 1919 (thereby becoming Sir Harold Ruggles-Brise). In addition, he was made a Commander of the Belgian Order of Leopold, a Commander of the French Legion of Honour, and awarded the French Croix de Guerre.

== Cricket career ==
Ruggles-Brise was an all-round sportsman, considered an excellent shot and a good tennis player. He was best known for his cricketing prowess as a right-hand batsman and medium-pace bowler. He was in the Winchester XI 1880–82 and played for Oxford University Cricket Club in 1883, winning his Blue. The following year he played for the Marylebone Cricket Club (MCC). His first-class career for Oxford and MCC consisted of eight matches, in which he scored 278 runs at an average of 18.53 with a highest score of 73. He took one wicket. He also played twice for Essex in non-first-class matches. As a serving officer he played regularly for the Household Brigade team.

== Family ==
In 1895 Ruggles-Brise married music expert Lady Dorothea Stewart Murray (1866–1937), elder daughter of the 7th Duke of Atholl. They had no children. Ruggles-Brise died at the age of 63 on 24 June 1927 of pneumonia contracted after playing tennis a few days before.

== External sources ==
- Anglo-Boer War.com
- Cricket Archive
- Commonwealth War Graves Commission
- London Gazette
- The Long, Long Trail

Military offices
New command	GOC 40th Division; 1915–1917	Succeeded by John Ponsonby
Preceded by John Young	GOC 73rd Division; 1917–1918	Post disbanded
