= Muckle Jock Milburn =

English bagpipe player

John Milburn (c. 1754 – 1837), known as Muckle Jock ('muckle' is Northumbrian for 'big', 'large', 'great'), was a player of the Border pipes, from near Bellingham in Northumberland. His pipes, which survive, are in the Cocks collection at the Morpeth Chantry Bagpipe Museum; his family referred to this set as the 'half-long' pipes. Some more detailed photographs of this set of pipes, taken by Anita Evans, are at. Tradition states that this instrument was given to Muckle Jock in around 1772 by Col. Reid of Chipchase Castle; Milburn would only have been about 18 at the time, if this tradition is correct. The museum catalogue entry for his pipes states that they subsequently belonged to his grandson Lewis Proudlock; Cocks obtained them from Proudlock's daughter Elizabeth Stoddart. Although Muckle Jock's pipes survive, unfortunately there is no direct evidence of the music he played on them.

These pipes were used as a model for new instruments, made by James Robertson of Edinburgh, during the revival of the Border pipes in the 1920s – such an instrument is shown at. These were given a different drone configuration from the original, however; Milburn's pipes had a bass drone, together with two tenors an octave above it, while the Robertson pipes had a bass, a baritone drone a fifth higher, and a tenor at the octave.

Muckle Jock was described by Dr. Edward Charlton, who knew him, as "one of the last of the old Borderers", "a gigantic man ... as famous for the power of his lungs, as for his prowess in clearing a fair or emptying a keg of whisky". Charlton later wrote of him remembering more than once clearing the Bellingham Fair ground, with the Tarset and Tarretburn men at his back, to the old border cry of "Tarset and Tarretburn, Hard and heather-bred, YET-YET-YET!". A later account, makes clear that such a cry was the likely prelude to a fight. His association with the people of the Tarset area suggests that Muckle Jock originally came from Upper North Tynedale, towards the Border, rather than Bellingham itself.

Muckle Jock claimed descent from a Border Reiver, Barty of the Comb, and told this story about him to Charlton, in his Border dialect, closer to Scots than Northumbrian English: "My fore-elder, wi' twa ithers, gaed yence over the Borders to lift sheep on the Scottish side; for the Scottish thieves had harried sair in Tynedale. They gaed over by the Coquet heid, and lifted the sheep near Yetholm, and druv them down by Reedwater heid, when the Scots cam after them, three to three. My fore-elders made a stand upon the fell, and the Scots cam bravely up. Ane of our side fell at the first fore gathering, and anither was wounded; but ane of the Scots fell too. My fore-elder was then sore beset with the twa Scots, till he gat a straik at them with his swaird, and garred his heid spang alang the heather like an inion! And then the third Scot tuik aff over the hills, and my fore-elder carried the sheep into Tynedale." A fuller account, with more details, though not in Milburn's words, is given by Charlton in.

Muckle Jock died in April 1837, near Bellingham, "respected by a large circle of friends". He had worked as an auctioneer for 53 years, and was "justly celebrated for his judgment of stock".
