= Lewis Proudlock =

Lewis Proudlock (1838-1914) was a miner, trade unionist, musician, dancing master, poet and novelist from Northumberland.

== Early life ==
The surname Proudlock is common in Coquetdale and the surrounding region, and the forename Lewis is common in that family. He was born in Elsdon, to a poor family. He had very little formal schooling, lasting only three months, at a school in Elsdon Woodside, funded by the Rector of Elsdon. He started work in a local landsale coal mine at the age of 7. In 1869, he was living in Whitfield, in the south of the county, a lead mining region. He continued working in mining until after 1871, when the census records him as an ironstone miner. In the late 1870s the birth records of his children show he was living in Dinnington, and his obituary states that he worked as a coal miner there.

== Author and Musician ==
In 1869, while living in Whitfield, he had published "Poems and Songs", a small volume of poetry. It was favourably reviewed, and two of the poems printed, in the Newcastle Courant. One of these poems, "A Dirge" was written in memory of his namesake, probably a relative, Lewis Proudlock (1801-1826), himself a published poet.

In 1881, his census record shows that he gave his profession as "Teacher of Dancing and Author of Fiction and Poetry". In the local press, there were regular advertisements for his dancing classes and the associated balls, as well as accounts of other events where he played, from 1882 to 1887. He also advertised offering to provide dance music for events on violin or violins, cornet and violoncello. In 1881, he acquired from a Mr. Fish, of Angerton, near Hartburn, a manuscript written by one John Smith, dated 1753. Twenty tunes from this were copied by John Stokoe for the Newcastle Society of Antiquaries; these include the earliest known version of "The Keel Row", an elaborate fiddle variation set, as well as some fiddle settings of what seem to be Border pipe tunes. Unfortunately, the manuscript itself now seems to be lost. One dance tune, still widely played, is called "Proudlock's Hornpipe", or occasionally "Lewis Proudlock's Hornpipe". It has strong similarities to an 18th-century tune Belleisle's March, or the Monk's March, and there is no suggestion that Proudlock composed it; rather, its association with him probably dates from his activities as a dancing master and violinist. He is known to have owned a set of 18th century Border pipes, which had belonged to his relative Muckle Jock Milburn; these are now in the Morpeth Chantry Bagpipe Museum. His mother was Muckle Jock's youngest daughter.

In the same period, he also wrote two novels, "The Shepherd of the Beacon, or the Hero of the Khyber", dated by the British Library at 1877, whose action is based in Coquetdale, and later, "Crimson Hand, the Scourge of the Bushrangers: or, The Oath Redeemed", with action moving between Coquetdale and Australia; Proudlock refers to both books in an advertisement in 1882, so this too must have been published before this time . Both novels were published in Hexham. In 1887 he placed many advertisements offering the services of a dance band, so it is likely that at this time much of his working life was still based on music; from then on, there is little evidence of professional musical activity. It is unclear whether he was continuing to work as a miner during this period.

From the late 1880s he seems to have returned completely to mining, working in particular at Stobswood Colliery, near Ulgham until his retirement. He was active in the Miners' Association, serving as a delegate for pits where he worked, and at times on the executive of the union.

== Later life ==
In about 1896, he published a second volume of poems, "Borderland Muse", which as well as including poems evoking the landscape and nature of Northumberland, also include an extended cycle of narrative poems about a fire below ground in a coal mine, and a poem "The Charge of the Household Brigade at Kassassin", commemorating an action in which his younger brother Jaspar was severely wounded. The book was dedicated to the Duke of Teck, and Proudlock expresses gratitude to HRH Princess Mary of Teck for her patronage - it seems likely that she assisted him with the cost of publication. He seems to have had a considerable reputation locally as a poet, already being mentioned by name in a toast to "our local poets" at a Burns Supper as early 1871, while The Borderland Muse was praised, shortly after its publication, by another pitman poet, James Atchison, in a letter to the Durham County Advertiser Atchison also included a poem of his own in response.

In 1911, he moved away from Stobswood, and much of his property was auctioned. In a short notice on the death of his wife, he is referred to specifically as the author of The Borderland Muse, and it is noted there that the work describes life both in the border country and in the pits. As this was more than 15 years after the work's publication, his reputation cannot have been short-lived. It is also stated there that at this time he was living in retirement in Morpeth.

== Death ==
He died in Morpeth on 4 September 1914. He was given an extended obituary in the Morpeth Herald, headlined "Death of Lewis Proudlock, Novelist and Poet", where he was described as "One of the most remarkable and versatile men produced among the miners of Northumberland". Another article in the same issue of this paper referred to "his ceaseless craving for the acquisition of knowledge", and stated that he had acquired "a tolerable library for a man in his position". That was almost certainly an understatement, as the sale of some of his property in 1911 included a 16 volume encyclopedia.
