= Lowland and Border Pipers' Society =

The Lowland and Border Pipers' Society was formed in the early 1980s, to promote the study and playing of bagpipes of Northern England and the Scottish Borders and Lowlands, such as the Scottish smallpipes, pastoral pipes, and border pipes.

According to their constitution: "The aims of the Society shall be to foster awareness of and interest in the traditional and contemporary music and associated lore of the Lowland or Border bagpipes and the Scottish smallpipes, and to encourage their playing, manufacture and development. This shall be done, within the Society's means, through organizing and supporting meetings, performances, publications, broadcasts, recordings and any other appropriate means. Also, where appropriate, to foster mutually enriching links with other organisations and individuals having similar interests, in Scotland and around the world, thus strengthening interest in bagpipe music, its place in Scottish culture and within traditional music as a whole."

The organisation holds events and competitions, supplies instructional materials, and publishes a journal, Common Stock. The title of the journal refers to the array of drones on Lowland bagpipes, which are grouped together in a "common stock" rather than separately attached to the bag, such as on the Great Highland bagpipe. The society has played a key role in the success of the revival of the bellows bagpipe traditions of Scotland.
