= Fenwick manuscript =

Compilation of Northumbrian pipe music

The J.W. Fenwick manuscript, compiled in the second half of the 19th century, is a compilation of Northumbrian pipe music, together with other material associated with the instrument. Fenwick was a tailor, who lived in North Shields from about 1841. The same town was the home of the Reid family of pipers and pipemakers, and several other prominent pipers lived nearby. By 1894 Fenwick was described as "one of the oldest and best-known small pipes players in the county"; by this time he seems to have been playing for about 50 years. The manuscript was apparently being compiled throughout this period.

== Significance ==
This source is particularly important, in that for many of the tunes Fenwick is careful to indicate his source for the version he gives. For instance, in some cases Fenwick gives a provenance from Cornelius Stanton, and occasionally via Stanton to John Peacock. Two of the tunes from Stanton, in Stanton's own hand, Little wot ye wha's coming and Blackett of Wylam were attributed by him to Peacock, although it is not in the collection of Peacock's tunes published about 1800. These tunes are also known from the manuscripts of Peacock's pupil Robert Bewick, but any direct association of them with Peacock had previously been conjectural. Another important group of tunes have an attribution to Robert Reid, or his children James Reid and Elizabeth Oliver. One of the Reid tunes is a 5-strain set of The Dorrington Lads, from Mrs Oliver, whose comment is noted that "This is most likely the same copy that poor Will Allen was trying to play when his Spirit was called Home to a more blissful Rest". This version was known, from the Rook manuscript, but its association with the Reid family was not. Given Robert Reid's father Robert Reed's known association with James Allan, this link is entirely possible. Further, some tunes or versions are otherwise unknown - a version of Shew's the Way to Wallington, from James Reid, is distinct from previously known sets.

One long variation set, of six strains, on the tune "Highland Black Laddie", called "Highland Laddie" in the manuscript, is attributed to Robert Mackintosh, a Scottish violinist and composer, whose son Abraham had settled in Newcastle; it seems to be unknown elsewhere, but an unusual variant of the same tune in the Rook manuscript, also called "Highland Laddie", is thematically related to the final pair of these variations - together they suggest that the original composition had eight strains.

Some printed dance music in the collection is particularly associated with the North Shields area; further, the well known tune "Lamshaw's Fancy", is here called "Lamshaw of North Shield's Fancy", which must refer specifically to Young William Lamshaw, who lived in the town, and was an early player of the keyed smallpipes - the tune's compass, from D to a, fits the earliest form of the keyed instrument.

== History ==
The manuscript includes, a body of tunes in Cornelius Stanton's hand, consisting of simple traditional tunes as well as popular songs from the 1840s and 1850s, including several by Stephen Foster, and the music hall song "Villikins and his Dinah". These simple tunes, well known at the time, would all be suitable for a beginner. So it is reasonable to suppose that these form the earliest part of the manuscript, perhaps from when Fenwick was learning to play, but certainly after 1840, and before Stanton's death in 1866. An alternative less likely reading is that Fenwick asked Stanton for a collection of tunes that he could use for teaching. The collection seems to have continued to grow throughout Fenwick's life, for example including tunes he received from Elizabeth Oliver in 1883, and material for Fenwick's own tutor, published more than a decade later in 1897. After Fenwick died in 1907, the manuscript, probably still a collection of loose papers, passed to the Newcastle antiquarian Richard Welford, who had been active in the Northumbrian Small Pipes Society; he would probably have known Fenwick, a Committee member of the Society, from this time. From him it passed to C.O.P. Gibson of Bywell. It was probably Gibson who showed the manuscript to G.G. Armstrong, who lived nearby; his notebooks contain tunes stated as being from Fenwick's manuscript, including Elizabeth Oliver's variation set on Maggie Lauder, since published in the Northumbrian Pipers' Third Tune Book. At some point the manuscript was bound, and its compiler misidentified as J.W. Fenwick, a solicitor of Hexham. As Welford would almost certainly have known Fenwick, it was perhaps Gibson who misidentified him. The manuscript came onto the market in May 2016, and is currently in private hands. The current owner has placed some information on the webpage. This page includes a detailed section on tunes associated with the Reid family, including images from relevant pages of the manuscript. It is expected that as more is learned about the manuscript and its contents, this website will be expanded.

== Compiler ==
Despite an identification, made in the manuscript, of Fenwick with a solicitor of that name who lived in Hexham, which is apparently a mistake by a later owner, the records of the Northumbrian Small Pipes Society show that after 1890 James Fenwick was a tailor, living in North Shields. This seems to tie in with an 1851 census entry, listing a James Fenwick, tailor and publican, at the Phoenix Inn in Bedford Street, North Shields. Intermediate identifications are tentative, as the name James Fenwick is common locally. As well as his involvement with the NSPS, in particularly compiling a tutor for the instrument, published by them, he had previously been involved with John Collingwood Bruce and the Society of Antiquaries of Newcastle upon Tyne, when they were organising a series of piping competitions in the 1870s. A surviving letter from Bruce to Fenwick, pasted into the MS, shows that a version of Fenwick's Instructions for playing the small-pipes existed as early as 1877.
