= Lady Evelyn Stewart Murray =

British folklorist

- Born: 17 March 1868; Blair Castle, Perthshire, Scotland
- Died: 30 July 1940 (aged 72); Easter Moncrieffe, Perthshire
- Resting place: Tirnie, Blair Atholl
- Known for: Gaelic folklorist, needleworker
- Parent(s): John Stewart-Murray, 7th Duke of Atholl; Louisa Moncreiffe

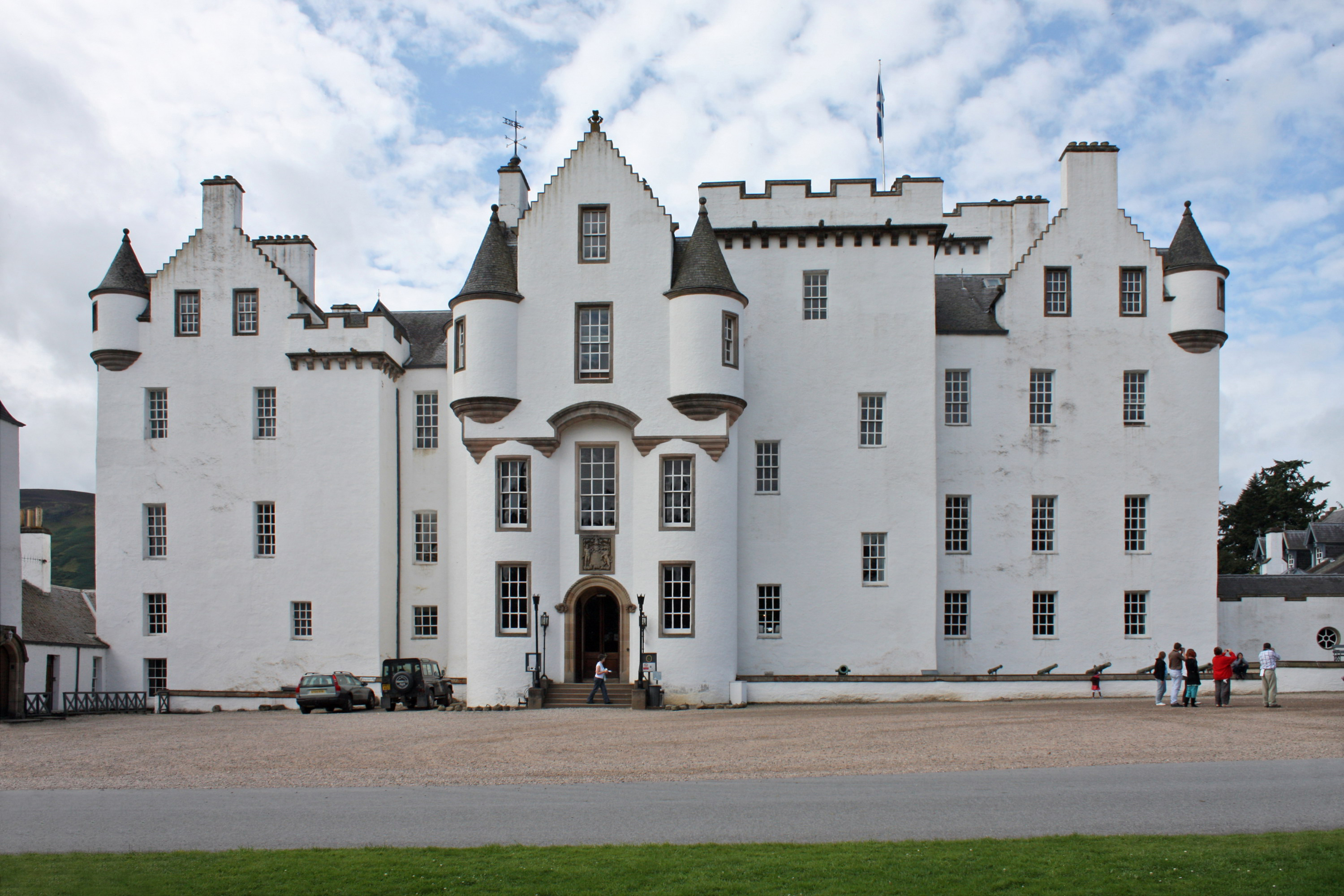
Blair castle - the childhood home of Lady Evelyn Stewart Murray

Lady Evelyn Stewart Murray (17 March 1868 – 30 July 1940) was a Scottish folklorist who collected Gaelic folk tales and songs. She was also a skilled needleworker and collector of embroidery and lace.

== Life ==
Lady Evelyn Stewart Murray was born at Blair Castle in Perthshire, Scotland on 17 March 1868, the youngest daughter of John Stewart-Murray, 7th Duke of Atholl, and his wife, Louisa Moncreiffe, daughter of Sir Thomas Moncreiffe, 7th Baronet.

Murray received a typical Victorian aristocratic education being tutored by governesses at home. At an early age she became interested in Gaelic and was encouraged by her father who was a fluent, enthusiast for the language. From 1887 to 1891, she collected more than 240 Gaelic folk tales and songs from Gaels in and around the Atholl estate. Her serious and deep academic study of the language brought her into conflict with her parents who did not consider it an appropriate pursuit for a young woman of her class. When her parents attempted to limit her academic work she developed severe psychosomatic illnesses. In late 1891, in an attempt to restore her health, her parents sent to Switzerland for what was intended to be a short visit. Murray refused to return from Switzerland to Scotland and remained estranged from her parents for the rest of her life. She however continued to correspond with and visit her siblings.

In 1885, Murray settled in Belgium where she lived on a modest allowance from her parents. She became a keen collector and a skilled practitioner of needlework. Her embroidered depiction of the British Coat of Arms is considered to be an exceptional example of the art. In 1936, she sent her collection of lace and embroidery home to be exhibited at Blair Castle, when it opened to the public for the first time.

Prior to World War II Murray left Belgium for Britain, settling in London. She died on 30 July 1940 at her brother's house in Easter Moncrieffe in Perthshire.

Her collection of Gaelic folklore and song are held at the School of Scottish Studies, University of Edinburgh. Her methodical and scientific approach in recording the now extinct Perthshire Gaelic dialect have brought recognition for the importance of her work. The tales were published as a collection in Gaelic with English translations in 2009.

Her collection of 502 texts were presented to National Library of Scotland in 1958 by Iain Murray, 10th Duke of Atholl. The collection consists of 19th century religious and literary works in Gaelic.
