= Robert Reid (pipemaker) =

Robert Reid (1784 – 1837) is widely acknowledged as the creator of the modern form of the Northumbrian Smallpipes. He lived and worked at first in Newcastle upon Tyne, but moved later to the nearby town of North Shields at the mouth of the Tyne, probably in 1802. North Shields was a busy port at this time. The Reids were a family with a long-standing connection to piping; Robert's father Robert Reed (sic), a cabinet maker, had been a player of the Northumbrian big-pipes, and an associate of James Allan, his son Robert was described later by James Fenwick as a beautiful player as well as maker of smallpipes, while Robert's son James (1814–1874) joined his father in the business. Robert died in North Shields on the 13th or 14 January 1837, and his death notice in the Newcastle Journal referred to him as a "piper, and as a maker of such instruments is known from the peer to the peasant, for the quality of their tone, and elegance of finish". He is buried in the graveyard of Christ Church, North Shields. His wife Isabella died in 1849, of cholera. There were repeated outbreaks of the disease at this time especially in the poor 'low town', near the river, where the Reids lived.

After Robert's death, James continued the business alone, in particular maintaining pipes, although there are a few sets made solely by James, who was also a piper. Robert's daughter Elizabeth, Elizabeth Oliver after her marriage, was a piper too, the first known female Northumbrian piper, and was, together with James, an informant of the Ancient Melodies Committee when they were collecting material for the Northumbrian Minstrelsy. She later wrote to J. W. Fenwick, and he stated that the set of "Dorrington Lads" was as played by Robert Reid, and his son James, also his daughter Elizabeth Oliver; in a letter to Fenwick in 1883, she said it was "most likely the same copy that poor Will Allen was trying to play when his Spirit was called Home to a more blissful rest." Given the similarity between this version and that in the William Dixon manuscript, she may well have been right. An identical version had appeared in the Rook manuscript, of 1840, suggesting that Rook learned it from the Reids, perhaps from Robert himself. As the two texts are note for note identical, despite a gap in time of more than 40 years, it can be seen that Elizabeth was a very careful informant. A complex variation set on "Maggie Lauder" in Fenwick's manuscript collection, not in his hand, is stated by him to be Mrs. Oliver's copy, 'as she had learned it from her father'. She seems to have had a significant collection of manuscript music from her father, but it is not known to have survived. A number of tunes from James Reid also appear in Fenwick's manuscript; in all there are 12 tunes there with a provenance from one or other of the Reids.

== Pipemaking ==
Simple closed chanter smallpipes had existed since the late 17th century (possibly being described in the Talbot manuscript from about 1695) but became standard in Northumberland during the 18th. Keys were not added until around 1800 -John Peacock's tune book (c1800) includes A compleat drawing of J. Peacock's New Invented Pipe Chanter with the addition of four keys. As John Dunn was closely associated with Peacock at this time, Dunn may well have been the first to construct such an instrument, but sets of Reid pipes from this time onwards started including keys, and more keys were added to the design over the following years.

The Clough family had a 7 key set with a Reid chanter that Tom Clough stated had been made for his great grandfather Henry (1789–1842); this oral tradition, if correct, would date the set to around 1810 or 1820.

Another such chanter, dated c. 1820, is shown below - the four views show respectively:

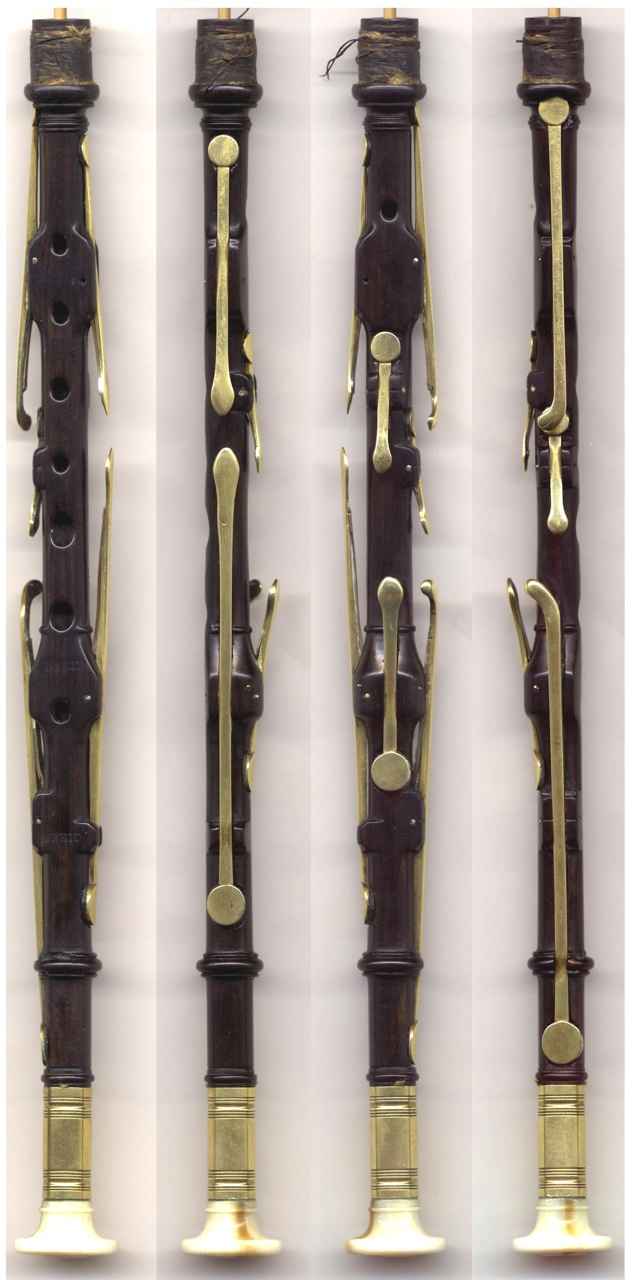
This is a composite image showing all sides of a classic seven keyed chanter made by Robert Reid, probably about 1820.

- from the front, the fingerholes (for G, A, B, c, d, e, f sharp),
- from the player's left, the keys (for low E and high a) operated by the left little finger,
- from the back, the thumbhole (for high g) and two keys operated by the right thumb (for low F sharp and for d sharp),
- from the right, the other keys operated by the right thumb (for low D, c sharp, and high b).

The stamp used by Reid to mark instruments he made is shown here.

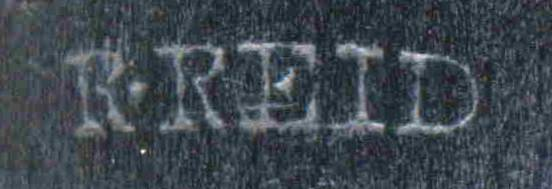
Robert Reid's maker's stamp

Francis Wood, himself a pipemaker, has written "From an instrument maker’s perspective, the Reid chanters appear extraordinary objects, a fine example of ideal design, which mysteriously seems to have emerged fully formed without any apparent evolution with the exception of the rare examples of 6 key chanters lacking the D sharp key. Some changes of detail occur throughout Reid’s career but what remains evident and constant is the extreme economy and functionality of the design, in which little is purely decorative. Every detail is generally present for a practical reason, to a degree that is remarkable. The very compact keywork also conforms to that principle. The outline of the keys remains close to the chanter stem with no part unduly projecting, a particularly neat construction that reduces the vulnerability of the keywork to accidental damage. Players will notice an immediately comfortable hold on the chanter, with keywork that is lightly and evenly sprung and with pleasantly rounded key-touches which accommodate differing angles of finger action. These are all characteristics which are evident on some finely made modern pipes but they are by no means universal."

By the 1830s 14 key chanters were available, of which a fine example, with 5 drones, is found in the Morpeth Chantry Bagpipe Museum. Reputedly, Tom Clough described this as “the finest set I ever played on”. Some detail of this set's keywork is shown here.

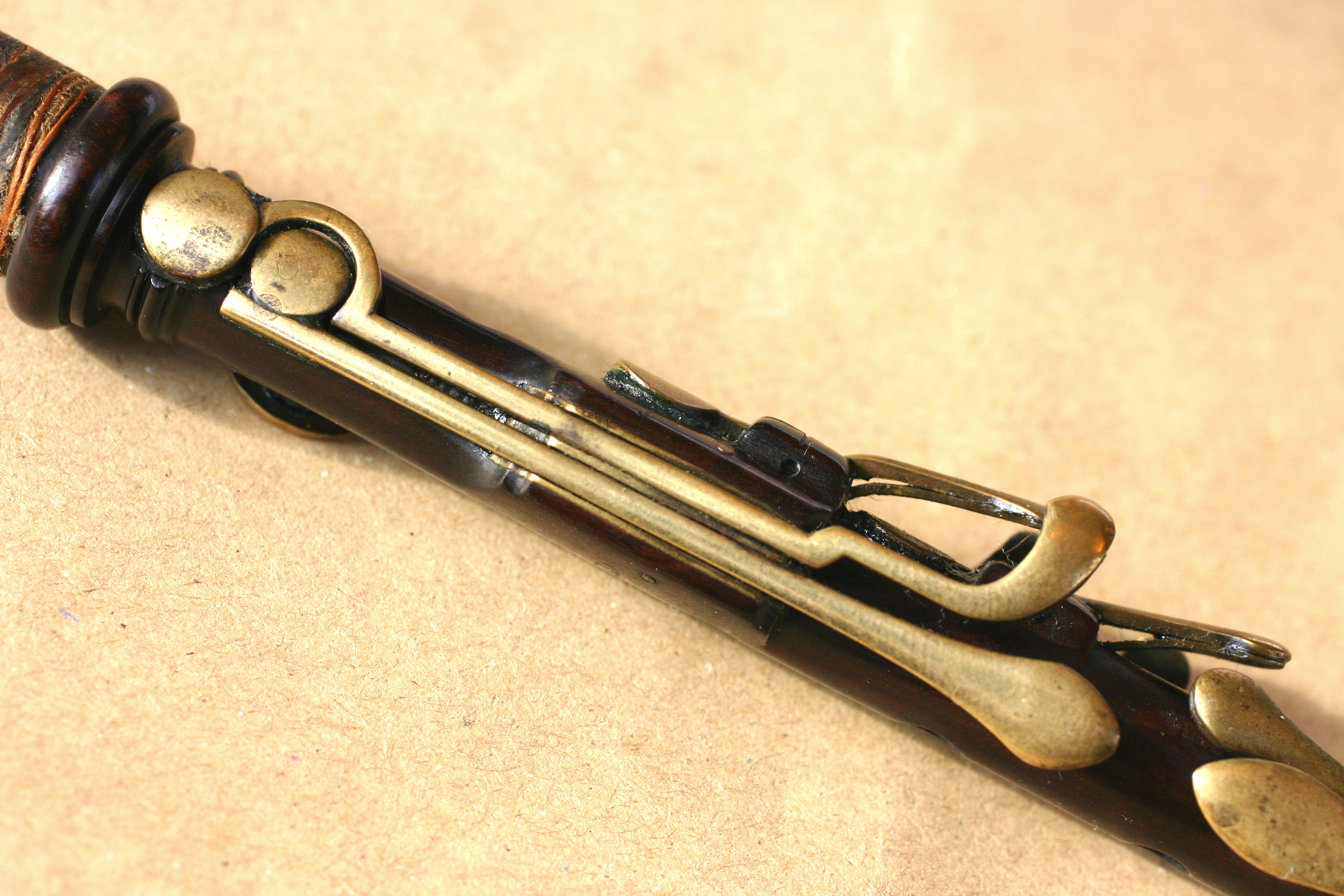
Detail of the keywork on a Reid 14-key chanter

The key arrangements found in this period have remained largely unchanged since.

A complex set assembled by James Reid, from parts made by his father, with six drones, was used as the frontispiece of James Fenwick's "Instruction Book for the Northumbrian Smallpipes", published in 1896. This set was probably one made for Cornelius Stanton shortly before Stanton's death. Only one such set is known.

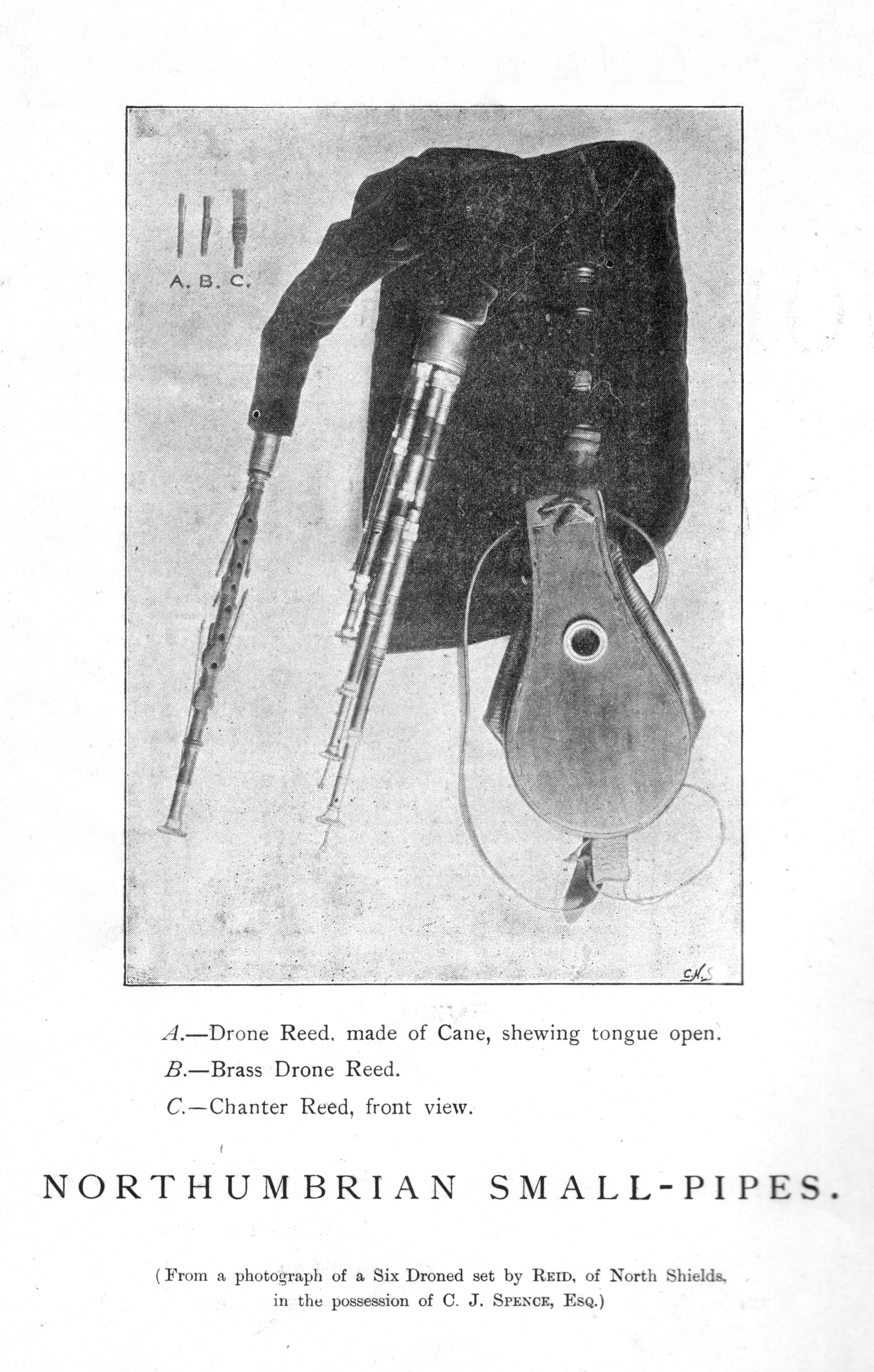
A photograph of a six-drone set of Northumbrian Smallpipes, made by James Reid of North Shields, used as the frontispiece of Fenwick's tutor for the instrument, published 1896.

Some 77 sets of pipes wholly or partially by Reid survive; some 45 in private hands and perhaps 10 are actively played; a number of sets by the Reids are also in public collections, most numerously in the Morpeth Chantry Bagpipe Museum.

Robert Reid was also active in making Union Pipes; the precursor to modern Uilleann pipes.

Union pipes early-19th century keyed D-Chanter; by the pipe maker Robert Reid

Henry Clough (I) was known to play a Reid set of Union pipes including regulators; surviving parts of this set are now in private hands.
