= John Stewart-Murray, 7th Duke of Atholl =

Scottish peer

His Grace The Duke of Atholl KT
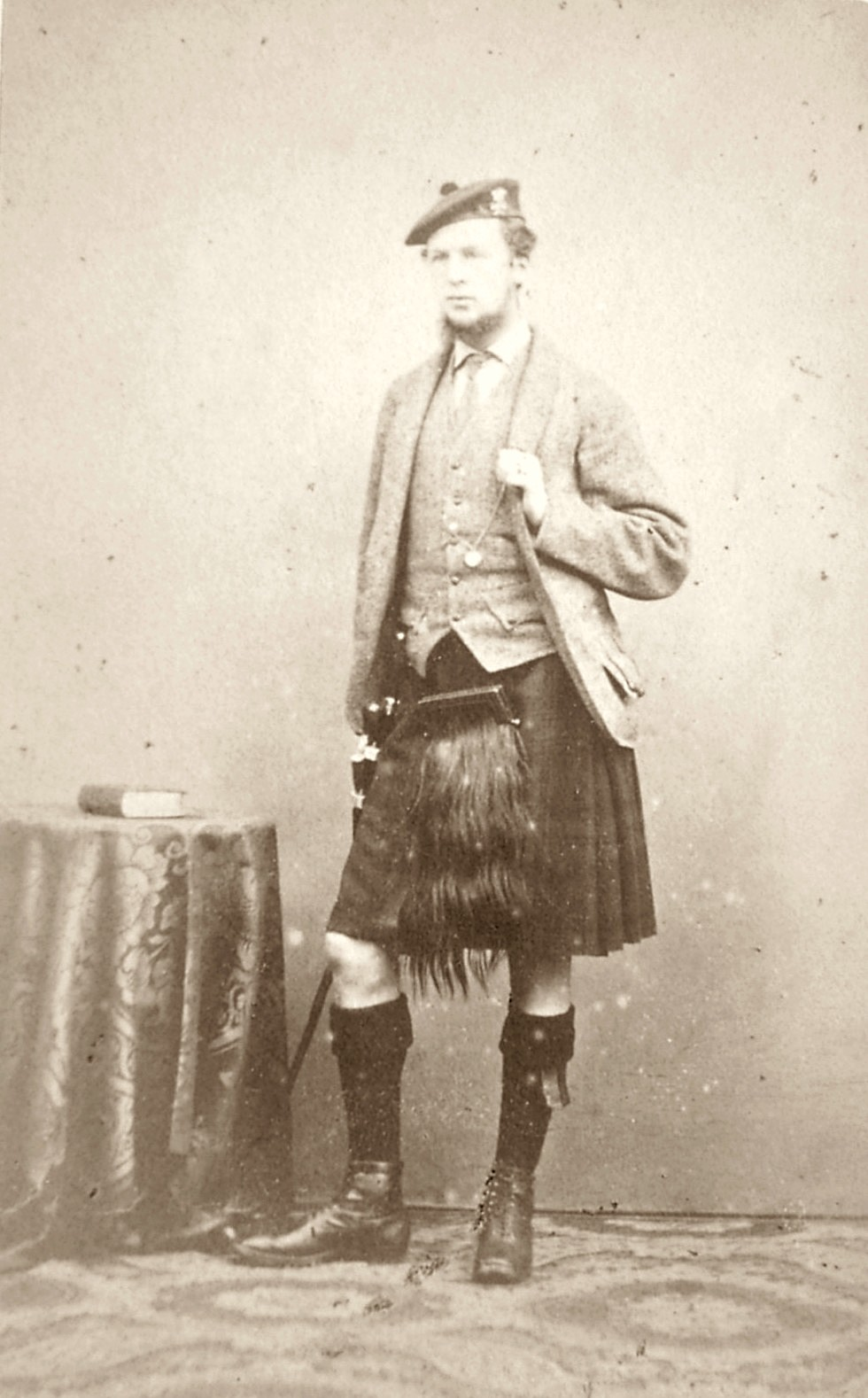
- The Duke of Atholl, c. 1860s

Lord-Lieutenant of Perthshire
- In office 1878–1917
- Monarchs: Victoria; Edward VII; George V
- Preceded by: The Lord Kinnaird
- Succeeded by: The Duke of Atholl

Personal details
- Born: 6 August 1840
- Died: 20 January 1917 (aged 76) Blair Castle, Perthshire, Scotland
- Spouse: Louisa Moncreiffe (m. 1863; died 1902)
- Children: 7, including Dorothea, Evelyn, John, and James
- Parent(s): George Murray, 6th Duke of Atholl; Anne Home-Drummond

John James Hugh Henry Stewart-Murray, 7th Duke of Atholl, KT (6 August 1840 – 20 January 1917), styled Marquess of Tullibardine between 1846 and 1864, was a Scottish peer.

== Background and education ==
Atholl was the only child of George Murray, 6th Duke of Atholl, and Anne, daughter of Henry Home-Drummond. He was educated at Eton.

He owned 201,000 acres in Perthshire.

== Career ==
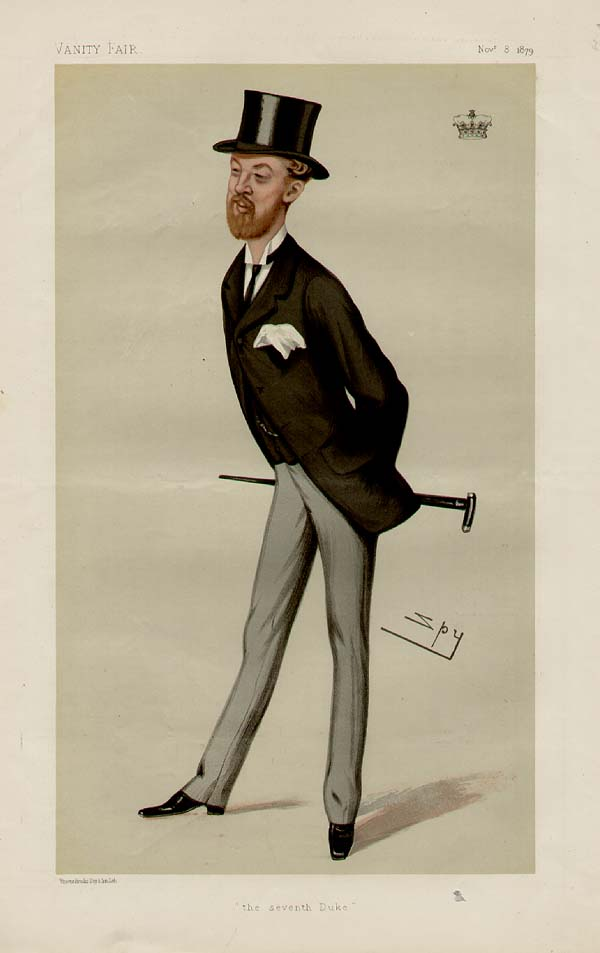
Caricature by Spy published in Vanity Fair in 1879.

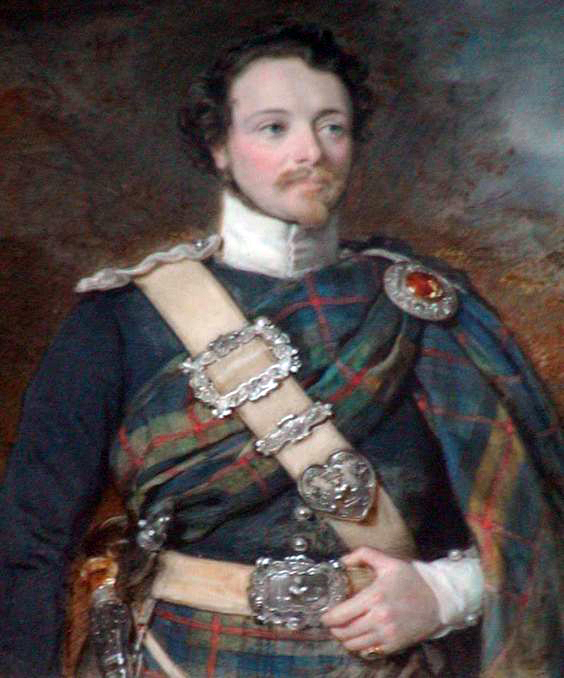
The 7th Duke in uniform of colonel of the Atholl Highlanders, c. 1860s

Atholl served in the Scots Fusilier Guards, achieving the rank of captain in 1864. The latter year he also succeeded his father in the dukedom. In 1865. he registered the additional surname of Stewart at the Lyon Court. From 1878 to 1917 he served as Lord-Lieutenant of Perthshire. He was appointed a Knight of the Thistle in 1868 and was Chancellor of the Order of the Thistle from 1913 until his death.

He is also remembered for having devoted years of his life to editing the records of the family and the related history.

== Marriage and issue ==
In 1863, a few months before he succeeded his father, Lord Tullibardine married Louisa Moncreiffe, daughter of Sir Thomas Moncreiffe of that Ilk, 7th Baronet.

The couple had four sons (of whom the eldest died in infancy) and three daughters (all of whom survived to adulthood):

Arms of the Duke of Atholl

- John Stewart-Murray, Marquess of Tullibardine (30 August 1869 – 31 August 1869); died shortly after birth
- Lady Dorothea Louisa Stewart-Murray (1866–1937), collector of early Scottish music; married Major Harold Goodeve Ruggles-Brise
- Lady Helen Stewart-Murray (20 April 1867 – 1 December 1934), married in 1916 sculptor David Alexander Tod of Tirinie
- Lady Evelyn Stewart-Murray (1868–1940), Scottish folklorist; died unmarried
- John George Stewart-Murray (1871–1942), Marquess of Tullibardine, later 8th Duke of Atholl; died unmarried
- Maj. Lord George Stewart-Murray (17 February 1873 – 14 September 1914), 1st Battalion, Black Watch; killed in action; died unmarried
- Lord James Thomas Stewart-Murray (1879–1957), later 9th Duke of Atholl; died unmarried

The Duchess of Atholl took great interest in the Scottish Horse, a military regiment raised by her son Lord Tullibardine for service in South Africa during the Second Boer War (1899-1902), and one of her latest public events was to assist in the equipment of a reinforcement company for the regiment in early 1902. She died in Italy on 9 July 1902, aged 58.

Their third son, Maj. Lord George Stewart-Murray, was reported missing after the First Battle of the Aisne on 12 September 1914. Five month later, they later received unofficial word that he was injured and being held at German prisoner-of-war camp in Soltau. However, this turned out to be false, and in 1916, he was officially reported killed in action.

The Duke of Atholl remained a widower until his death at Blair Castle in January 1917, aged 76.

Despite having six surviving children, the 7th Duke has no known grandchildren. The dukedom passed to his second but eldest surviving son, John Stewart-Murray, 8th Duke of Atholl, and later to his fourth son, Major James Stewart-Murray, 9th Duke of Atholl. Upon James' death in 1957, his fourth cousin, twice removed Iain Murray (1931–1996) succeeded as 10th Duke of Atholl. The Earldom of Strange and the Barony of Murray (both created 1786) became extinct. The Barony of Strange (created by error in 1628) fell into abeyance until John Drummond claimed it in 1965.

Honorary titles
Preceded by The Lord Kinnaird	Lord Lieutenant of Perthshire; 1878–1917	Succeeded by The Duke of Atholl
Preceded by First Holder	Chancellor of the Order of the Thistle; 1913–1917	Succeeded by The Duke of Montrose
Peerage of Scotland
Preceded by George Murray	Duke of Atholl; 1864–1917	Succeeded by John Stewart-Murray
Peerage of Great Britain
Preceded by Algernon Percy	Baron Percy; 1865–1917	Succeeded by John Stewart-Murray
