= William Dixon manuscript =

Oldest known manuscript of pipe music from the British Isles

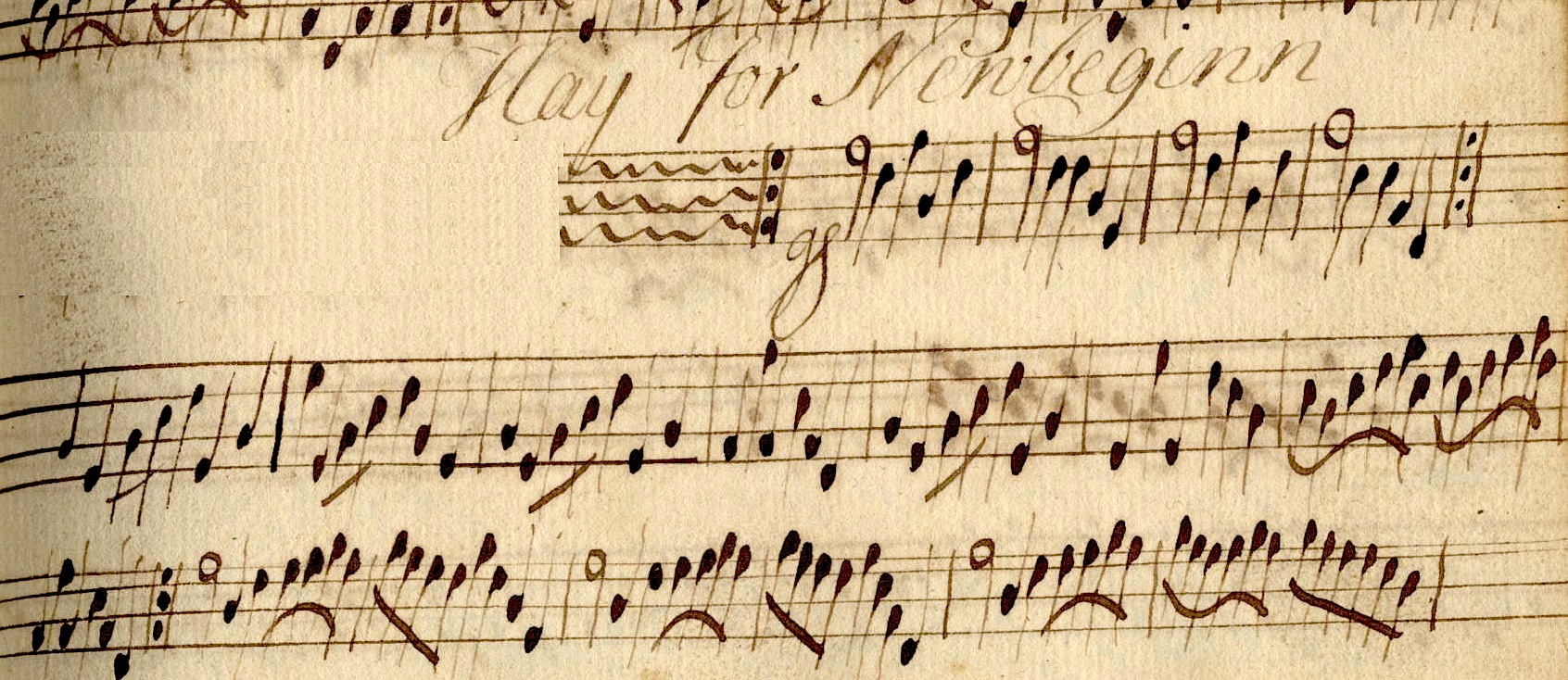
Hay for Newbiggen by William Dixon – modern facsimile (note only four lines)

The William Dixon manuscript, written down between 1733 and 1738 in Northumberland, is the oldest known manuscript of pipe music from the British Isles, and the most important source of music for the Border pipes. It is currently located in the A.K. Bell Library, Perth, Scotland. Little is known of William Dixon's biography, except what has been learned from this manuscript, and from parish records in Northumberland.

== The man ==
The only direct evidence for the author's identity comes from the manuscript itself, giving his name and two others, Parcival and John, who may have been his sons. It also gives dates from 1733 to 1738. Many of the tunes in the manuscript were, and some remain, current in Northumberland, or are named after places in the region. Baptismal records for that county show that a William Dixson was christened in Stamfordham, Northumberland, in 1678, and that Parsivall and John, sons of William Dixson, were baptised nearby at Fenwick, near Stamfordham, in 1708 and 1710. Julia Say has found that these belonged to a branch of the Dixon family living at Ingoe South Hall, near Fenwick, where some of the family lived until recently. The tracing of this family is made easier by their tradition of using the names William and Parcival in many generations, especially as Parcival is so rare; on the other hand, the shared names make identification of individuals harder. Many of the family were buried in Stamfordham church where there is a fine memorial to them. It is recorded that Parcival was apprenticed as a scrivener; this suggests that some of the inscriptions in the book, in an ornate hand, but different styles, are his work. However it is clear from these that the book is William's – for example one reads 'William Dixon His Book May ye 10th 1733'. If this William Dixon was indeed the author of the manuscript, he would have been 55 when he started compiling it, and 60 when he ceased. One son of colliery owner John Dixon, another William (1788–1859), founded an important iron business with five blast furnaces in central Scotland later in the century, which was further developed by his son. 'Dixon's Blazes' survived as a business in Glasgow until 1958, and still has a placename there. Julia Say has conjectured that this is how the manuscript reached Scotland.

== The manuscript ==
Nothing is definitely known of the whereabouts of the manuscript in the 18th and 19th centuries. At the beginning of the 20th century, however, it was in the collection of the composer and cellist Charles Macintosh, of Inver, Perthshire. His grandfather had been a pupil of Niel Gow, who lived in the same village. In 1909, he offered it to the music collector, Dorothea Ruggles-Brise, reportedly saying "I have an old torn book upstairs; it is of no use to anyone; you may have it if you like". She replied "This is a curiosity, I would rather not rob you. Will you let me buy it?". Offended, he answered "In that case, I will put it in the fire." She pulled it out, before it was damaged. She correctly recognised the music as "a collection of pipe jigs of the border country". This book, and the other music books in her personal collection, known as the Atholl Collection, were bequeathed to Perth Public Library on her death in 1938.

The manuscript was more definitively identified as pipe music from south of the border by the piper and fiddler Matt Seattle in 1995; previously it had been considered by some as fiddle music, albeit rather odd. He was able to publish a transcription that same year, with extensive notes, as The Master Piper; this has recently been reissued in a third edition. It was transposed up a tone from the source, to suit modern Border pipes, which are generally notated in A.

The importance of the manuscript as a musical source, apart from its antiquity, is the almost unique nature of the music. Almost all of the 40 pieces in the manuscript are long variation sets on dance tunes – one, Dorrington, running to 14 strains. Much of the figuration is similar to early Northumbrian smallpipe music, but the compass of many of the tunes is 9 notes, from F to g, with no sharps or flats, rather than the single octave of the unkeyed Northumbrian smallpipes of the time. It thus seems that the music was written either for smallpipes with an open ended chanter, like Scottish smallpipes, or else for what are now known as Border pipes. Both of those instruments had largely died out by the mid-19th century, and their repertoire had survived only in fragments, mostly in adaptations for other instruments, such as fiddle, Northumbrian Smallpipes, or lute.

== The music ==
In this manuscript was found a large body of music, of considerable sophistication, readily playable on either Scottish Smallpipes or Border Pipes. The musical style is very different from Highland pipe music, despite the many common features of the instruments. In particular, there is no explicitly prescribed ornamentation anywhere, only an occasional direction to ornament certain notes. In contrast, Highland pipe music usually specifies complex patterns of grace notes in detail. Further, the Dixon music tends to avoid repeated notes, and to move predominantly stepwise or in thirds rather than in wider intervals.

The tunes form a substantial and varied repertoire. Some of them are known in other versions in the Northumbrian and the Lowland Scottish traditions – but some of the tunes are not known elsewhere, and all the Dixon versions are distinct from their known parallels. Besides one short minuet, and one song-tune with a pair of variations, there is a selection of dance-music in different rhythms. These include

- 13 reels, rants or common-time hornpipes, in 4/4 or 2/2,
- 10 jigs, in 6/4,
- 6 triple time hornpipes, in 3/2,
- 9 tunes in compound triple time, 'slip jigs', in 9/4.

The time signatures are not given explicitly, but can be deduced from the melodic patterns and bar-lengths. In the manuscript most of the triple-time hornpipes and some slip-jigs are wrongly notated, with bar lengths of respectively of 4 or 6 crotchets, when 6 or 9 would follow the melodic patterns. The time signatures have been corrected to 3/2 and 9/4 in the transcription. Such mistaken notation was fairly common at the time, perhaps for ease of reading. The rhythms are not always straightforward – the 3/2 hornpipes show the characteristic syncopation of the form, generally across the second beat in even numbered bars. As in most other Northumbrian examples of 3/2 hornpipes, the syncopated note is not tied, but a pair of repeated notes. Some strains in tunes of other types, such as 6/4 and 9/4 jigs, are also syncopated.

Dick Hensold has argued that the collection can be split into two distinct parts, one family consisting of the single octave tunes, many corresponding to known Northumbrian smallpipe tunes, or similar in style to known examples of these, while the other, somewhat larger, group contains tunes which use the full nine-note melodic range of a nine-note chanter, with its greater harmonic possibilities. In particular, many tunes use the subtonic chord, G major in Matt Seattle's transcription, as well as the A major chord which is consonant with the drones. Most of the tunes in either group have strains based on two chords, typically G major and A major for the nine-note tunes, but several, notably "Dorrington", are significantly richer, with the dissonant chord varying from strain to strain.

One tune from the smallpipe group, Gingling Geordie, has been placed online at the Dragonfly Music website. It is an illustration of the style and inventiveness of the Dixon tunes, and it compares well with later versions. Several of these, and two 17th-century versions, can be found on the FARNE archive; more modern versions, since its use as an election song, have been known as Wylam Away. They are all (except for a single minuet) 'long variation sets'; sets of four or more strains, based on the same underlying harmonic pattern as the first, (typically only 2 chords), and all variations ending in a common melodic 'tag'. The tags of different tunes are clearly recognisable, and a feature of the harmonic scheme is how the underlying chords fit with the drones, and the rhythm of the resulting concord and dissonance. As an example, in Gingling Geordie, typically for smallpipe tunes, the underlying chords are the tonic, A major, and supertonic, B minor – the latter is dissonant against drones sounding in A, and here each strain reaches this chord at its midpoint.

Melodically, strains are constructed from simple standard motifs, maybe repeated, in Gingling Geordie these lead into the supertonic at the end of the first 2-bar phrase, and the tag in the tonic at the end. It should be stressed that in some tunes the harmonic pattern is shifted, so the tonic chord does not necessarily fall at the end. A lot of the melodic motifs are 'floating' in that they are used in several different tunes – perhaps at different pitches to fit a different harmony. The importance of this structure to the player is that these motifs lie well under the fingers on Border Pipes, so the music is technically not as difficult as it sounds, either to play or to learn. The effect for the listener, though, is one of structured improvisation.

== Modern response ==
The publication of the music in 1995 led to a significant response – Border Pipers had available a larger body of traditional music appropriate to the instrument, and this led to considerable discussion in the community about how it might be approached. In particular, the Lowland and Border Pipers' Society's 1997 Collogue was devoted wholly to the Dixon music and related questions. The talks given there have since been published by the LBPS as Out of the Flames. In 1999, Matt Seattle released a CD, also called Out of the Flames, DGM 9907, in which several of the Dixon tunes were recorded – many pipers and others have released recordings of Dixon tunes since then. Matt Seattle maintains a 'Dixxxography', of all recordings of the Dixon music. There have been 40 recordings, including 23 of the tunes. Two of the tunes were played directly from the manuscript in Perth Library. The recent third edition of The Master Piper includes, inter alia, a much fuller discussion of the relationships between the Dixon tunes and those in other published and manuscript sources. Many of these relationships have been greatly clarified since the first edition appeared.

In April 2015, to celebrate the 20th anniversary of the manuscript's publication, Matt Seattle, alongside pipers Chris Ormston, Iain Gelston and Pete Stewart and fiddler Morag Brown, held a Homecoming Concert in Stamfordham parish church, where many of the Dixon family are buried. The tunes are played each week by musicians who gather at the Canon pub in Jedburgh.

== Bibliography ==
- The Master Piper – Nine Notes That Shook the World, William Dixon (1733), edited Matt Seattle 1995, Dragonfly Music, ISBN 1-872277-23-3;

3rd edition, edited Matt Seattle 2011, ISBN 978-1-872277-33-2.

- Out of the Flames, compiler Roderick D. Cannon, Lowland and Border Pipers' Society 2004, ISBN 0-9522711-1-7.
