= Border pipes =

Type of Scottish bagpipe

18th-century set of border pipes played by Fin Moore

The Border pipes are a type of bagpipe related to the Scottish Great Highland Bagpipe. It is perhaps confusable with the Scottish smallpipe, although it is a quite different and much older instrument. Although most modern Border pipes are closely modelled on similar historic instruments, the modern Scottish smallpipes are a modern reinvention, inspired by historic instruments but largely based on Northumbrian smallpipes in their construction.

The name, which is modern, refers to the Anglo-Scottish Border region, where the instrument was once common, so much so that many towns there used to maintain a piper. The instrument was found much more widely than this, however; it was noted as far north as Aberdeenshire, south of the Border in Northumberland and elsewhere in the north of England. Indeed, some late 17th-century paintings, such as a tavern scene by Egbert van Heemskerck, probably from south-eastern England, show musicians playing such instruments. Other names have been used for the instrument: Lowland pipes and reel pipes in Scotland, and half-long pipes in Northumberland and Durham. However, the term reel pipes historically refers to instruments similar to Highland pipes, but primarily intended for indoor use.

While the instrument had been widespread in the 18th century, by the late 19th century it was no longer played. There was an attempted revival in north-east England in the 1920s and new instruments were created for Newcastle Royal Grammar School, Durham University OTC, and Northumberland Boy Scouts. The term half-long pipes is now used to refer specifically to surviving Northumbrian examples from this period; these were in part modelled on an 18th-century set which had belonged to Muckle Jock Milburn, and is now in the Morpeth Chantry Bagpipe Museum; however, they were given a different drone configuration.

== Description ==
The instrument consists of a chanter which plays the melody, drones which play a constant unchanging harmony, a bag which holds the air to blow drones and chanter, and a set of bellows to supply air to the bag. An early photograph from Northumberland, c. 1859, shows the instrument well.

=== Chanter ===
The instrument has a conical-bored chanter, in contrast to the cylindrically-bored Scottish smallpipe. The modern instruments are louder than the Scottish smallpipe, though not as loud as the Great Highland Bagpipe; they blend well with stringed instruments.

The chanter has a thumb hole and seven finger-holes. The compass of the chanter is nine notes, from G to a, though a few higher notes, typically b, c', and c#', are obtainable on some chanters by 'pinching' and overblowing. As with the Highland pipes, the basic scale is a mixolydian scale on A. Some chanters can play chromatic notes however, and some old tunes, for instance Bold Wilkinson or Wat ye what I got late yestreen, suggest a dorian scale may also sometimes have been used, requiring a minor third instead of the major third of the mixolydian scale. This could be achieved by cross-fingering or half-holing. Pete Stewart has further argued that the existence of some G major tunes with a nine-note compass from G to a suggests that Border pipes formerly sounded a c natural, rather than c sharp; cross-fingering would then have been needed to sound a c sharp.

Some instruments are made in other pitches, typically B flat or G, rather than A.

=== Drones ===
The instrument has three cylindrically bored drones inserted into the pipebag by a common stock, typically tuned A, a, e', or A, a, a. In contrast, the Great Highland Bagpipe has each drone in a separate stock. The drone tuning A, e, a was used in half-long pipes in the early 20th century, and though still rare, sets are now beginning to be made with this drone tuning again.

=== Bag and bellows ===
The bag is not filled with breath from the player's mouth, but instead is supplied with dry air, from a set of bellows strapped under the player's right arm. This keeps the reeds drier, which helps keep the instrument in tune, as well as greatly extending the life of a reed.

== Repertoire ==
There is a distinct body of music for the instrument – many of these tunes survived in the fiddle and Northumbrian smallpipes repertoire after the playing of Border pipes died out in the mid-19th century. Others survive in manuscript sources from the 18th and 19th century.

=== Sources ===
Most notably, the William Dixon manuscript, dated 1733, from Stamfordham in Northumberland, was identified as Border pipe music by Matt Seattle in 1995, and published by him with extensive notes.

The book contains forty tunes, almost all with extensive variation sets. Some of these are limited to a single octave, and many of this group correspond closely to tunes for Northumbrian smallpipes known from early 19th-century sources – "Apprentice Lads of Alnwick" is one of these; others are melodically and harmonically richer – using the full nine-note compass and the G major subtonic chord – a fine example of this group is Dorrington. Another very early, though limited, source is George Skene's manuscript fiddle book of 1715, from Aberdeenshire. Besides settings for fiddle, some playable on the pipes, it contains four pieces explicitly stated to be in bagpipe style, all variation sets on Lowland tunes.

Another limited early 18th-century source, is Thomas Marsden's 1705 collection of Lancashire Hornpipes, for fiddle; one clear example of a pipe tune here is "Mr Preston's Hornpipe", with a characteristic nine-note compass. Significantly, this tune is in the Dorian mode on A, with C natural throughout, rather than the Mixolydian mode of the Dixon tunes.

Several Border pipe tunes, including "The English Black and the Grey", "Bold Wilkinson" and "Galloping over the Cowhill", were copied in the 19th century by John Stokoe from the mid-18th century John Smith MS, from Northumberland, dated 1753. This manuscript was, from 1881, the property of Lewis Proudlock, who showed it to Stokoe, but it has since been lost. Some tunes in James Oswald's Caledonian Pocket Companion, also from the mid-18th century, ostensibly for flute or violin, are identifiable as Border pipe tunes. Another important source is the Vickers fiddle manuscript from Northumberland – many tunes in this have the characteristic nine-note compass of pipe tunes.

A later Scottish source, from the early 19th century, is Robert Riddell's Collection of Scotch, Galwegian and Border Tunes – besides some tunes for fiddle and some for smallpipes, others, such as "Torphichen's Rant", clearly have the range and the idiom of Border pipe tunes. The smallpipe manuscript of Robert Bewick of Gateshead, besides many smallpipe tunes and transcribed fiddle tunes, contains several nine-note tunes, now identified as Border pipe music. Some of the smallpipe tunes in Peacock's book, from the early 19th century, are in the Lydian mode, with a tonic of c, but with one sharp in the key signature; these – "Bobby Shaftoe" is one – make more musical sense in the major mode with an f natural, viewed as adaptations from originals for Border pipes. The Peacock, John Smith and some of the Bewick tunes are reproduced in the FARNE archive.

=== Stylistic features ===
These tunes display several features distinguishing them from music for fiddle, Northumbrian pipes and Highland pipes. The nine-note modal scale, usually mixolydian, with a compass from the subtonic up to the high tonic, separates them clearly from most fiddle and smallpipe tunes. In particular, the interval of an augmented fourth, difficult on the fiddle, is much more common in these tunes. The compass of fiddle tunes is generally wider, while the older smallpipe tunes have an eight-note range from the tonic up to an octave higher. One complication is the long tradition in Scotland of writing tunes to be played on the fiddle, but 'in bagpipe style', often with the strings retuned to imitate drones; 18th century examples of these can fit well on Border pipes, and may well have been intended as imitations of this instrument.

Further, an important difference between the music of the Border pipes and of the Great Highland bagpipe is that many melodic figures in older Border pipe music typically move stepwise or in thirds rather than by wide intervals, and lack the multiple repeated notes found in many Highland pipe tunes. This suggests that in contrast to the Highland pipes, Border pipe music neither needed, nor greatly used, the complex graces which are so characteristic of Highland pipe music. The four specifically named pipe tunes from Skene's manuscript contain complex written-out gracings, and many more repeated notes than the Dixon tunes, so it is reasonable to conclude that playing styles in the 18th century varied from place to place. Modern attempts to reconstruct a musically valid playing style for Border music such as the Dixon tunes have been very successful, and several respected pipers play in such styles. These are characterised by simple gracings, used sparingly, mostly either for rhythmic emphasis or to separate repeated notes.

== Outside of Border music ==
The Border pipes have been taken up by many groups of pipers who were looking for a suitable instrument with which to play their music. This has not just been by musicians who play the music of the Scottish borders. For example, in Cape Breton and Nova Scotia, the instrument is used by highland pipers to play along with fiddles and other softer instruments. As the modern instrument is still fairly newly revived, ideas on playing styles are still evolving and naturally depend on the kind of music being played.

== Musical societies ==
The Lowland and Border Pipers' Society was formed in 1982 and has played a large part in the revival of the instrument and its music. In the North East, the Northumbrian Pipers' Society has played a similar role for both Border pipes and Northumbrian smallpipes. The instrument is now once again widely played, and the original Border repertoire for the instrument, particularly the Dixon tunes, is becoming better known.

== Notable players ==
- Gillian Chalmers of Bodega
- Paul Dunmall
- Hamish Moore
- Finlay MacDonald
- Fred Morrison
- James Duncan MacKenzie of Breabach and Skara Ceilidh Band

== See also ==
- List of pipe makers
- List of bagpipes
- Music of Northumbria
