= The Voice of the People =

The Voice of the People is an anthology of folk songs produced by Topic Records containing recordings of traditional singers and musicians from England, Ireland, Scotland and Wales.

The series was first issued in 1998 as 20 CDs, compiled by Dr Reg Hall, a visiting fellow at Sussex University. A second series was issued in 2012 consisting of four volumes (7 CDs) compiled by Shirley Collins, Steve Roud and Rod Stradling. A third series was issued in 2013 comprising 4 albums (6 CDs and 1 DVD) of field recordings recorded by Peter Kennedy and selected by Dr Reg Hall. A fourth series was released in 2016 with two albums of three CDs each chronicling the music of the 'London-Irish' from the 1950s to the present day.

== Introduction ==
The traditional singers and musicians were celebrities within their own community but the majority were unknown to the world at large until the 1950s and 60s when collectors arrived with portable tape recorders. A few of them recorded enough material for an entire album. Most are known for a couple of songs. A few scraps of biographical notes are given in booklets that accompany the discs. Every one of them led working-class lives. Volumes 9 and 19 are collections of instrumentals. In a few cases the singers used song books or ballad sheets to supplement their repertoire, but in most cases their versions are from oral tradition. This collection is the UK equivalent of Harry Smith's Anthology of American Folk Music.

== Reviews ==
Brian Peters wrote in Roots World as "the crème de la crème of Britain's traditional singers and musicians". Veteran Records said it was "the greatest set of CDs of English, Irish and Scottish singing and music ever produced."

The album is listed in the accompanying book to the Topic Records 70 year anniversary boxed set Three Score and Ten as one of their classic records with Creeping Jane from volume 8 as the tenth track on the first CD and The Nut Dance from volume 16 as the first track on the second CD.

== Track listing ==
The titles detailed below are those used by the singers although there are often other titles for the songs so the links may go to a different title. The references in parentheses for songs are from the three major numbering schemes for folk songs, the Roud Folk Song Index, Child Ballad Numbers originating from Francis James Child and the Laws Numbers from the George Malcolm Laws numbering system.

=== First series ===
Volume 1: Come Let Us Buy the Licence - Songs of Courtship & Marriage

No.	Title	Artist	Length
1.	"I Courted a Wee Girl" (Roud 154)	Sarah Makem	3:44
2.	"The Green Bushes" (Roud 1040; Laws P2)	Geoff Ling	2:51
3.	"Lovely Johnny" (Roud 5168)	Mary Ann Haynes	1:03
4.	"The Collen From Coolbaun" (Roud 9233)	Tommy McGrath	2:53
5.	"Our Captain Calls All Hands" (Roud 602)	Pop Maynard	2:44
6.	"The Song of the Riddles" (Roud 36; Child 46)	Willie Clancy	3:41
7.	"The Bonnie Lass o' Fyvie" (Roud 545)	Jimmy McBeath	3:42
8.	"The Old Man Rocking the Cradle" (Roud 357)	Paddy Tunney	3:05
9.	"The Bold Fisherman" (Roud 291; Laws O24)	Harry Cox	2:47
10.	"The Lonely Maid" (Reel)	Rose Murphy	1:17
11.	"Who Are You, My Pretty Fair Maid?" (Roud 27; Laws O17)	Joe Heaney	3:08
12.	"The Gown of Green" (Roud 1085)	Jack Norris	2:39
13.	"The Bonnie Wee Lassie Fae Gouroch" (Roud 5212)	Belle Stewart	3:13
14.	"The Sweet Primroses" (Roud 586)	Phil Tanner	3:19
15.	"David's Flowery Vale" (Roud 2943)	Eddie Butcher	4:05
16.	"Abroad As I Was Walking" (Roud 413)	Turp Brown	1:43
17.	"The Blarney Stone" (Roud 4800)	Margaret Barry	2:28
18.	"Peggy Benn" (Roud 661)	Walter Pardon	3:13
19.	"The Little Drummer" (Roud 2302)	Martin Gorman	3:27
20.	"The Gypsy Girl" (Roud 229; Laws O4)	Joseph Taylor	1:45
21.	"Bound To Be a Row" (Roud 1616)	Jimmy McBeath	2:38
22.	"Nora Daly" (Roud 8002)	Micho Russell	4:05
23.	"When a Man's In Love He Feels No Cold" (Roud 990; Laws O20)	Paddy Tunney	3:33
24.	"An Old Man Came Courting Me" (Roud 210)	Jeannie Robertson	3:46

Volume 2: My Ship Shall Sail the Ocean - Songs of Tempest & Sea Battles, Sailor Lads & Fishermen

No.	Title	Artist	Length
1.	"A Broadside" (Roud 492; Laws N4)	Cyril Poacher	2:16
2.	"The Lowlands Of Holland" (Roud 484)	Paddy Tunney	3:37
3.	"Riding Down To Portsmouth" (Roud 1534)	Tom Willett	3:44
4.	"Come My Own One, Come My Fond One" (Roud 531; Laws K38)	Johnny Doughty	2:17
5.	"The Sailor On The Rope / The Bonnie Bunch Of Roses" (Hornpipes)	John Rae	2:34
6.	"In Scarborough Town" (Roud 185; Laws K18)	Sam Larner	4:07
7.	"Sandy's A Sailor" (Roud 12924)	Lizzie Higgins	1:34
8.	"The Streams Of Lovely Nancy" (Roud 688)	Turp Brown	1:40
9.	"On Board The Leicester Castle" (Roud 653)	George Ling	2:35
10.	"In London So Fair" (Roud 2989)	Mary Ann Carolan	5:11
11.	"A Ship To Old England Came" (Roud 1424)	Walter Pardon	2:59
12.	"Jesus At Thy Command" (Roud 12925)	Frank Verril	2:42
13.	"The Royal Albion" (Roud 2: Laws Q26)	Harry Upton	5:03
14.	"The Pretty Ploughboy" (Roud 186; Laws M24)	Harry Cox	3:03
15.	"The Poor Little Fisherboy" (Roud 912; Laws Q29)	Micho Russell	2:31
16.	"Cod Banging" (Roud 1747)	Bob Hart	1:27
17.	"Round Rye Bay For More" (Roud 8095)	John Doughty	1:48
18.	"Young Henry Martin" (Roud 104; Child 250)	Phil Tanner	3:33
19.	"A Sailor And His True Love" (Roud 660; Laws O30)	Cyril Poacher	2:29
20.	"The Fish And Chip Ship" (Roud 1854)	Bob Roberts	2:29
21.	"The Oak And The Ash" (Roud 269; Laws K43)	Jumbo Brightwell	3:15
22.	"The Banks Of Newfoundland" (Roud 1812; Laws K25)	Willie Scott	3:52
23.	"The Dark-Eyed Sailor" (Roud 265; Laws N35)	Fred Jordan	3:00
24.	"Jack Tar Ashore" (Roud 919; Laws K39)	Walter Pardon	2:53

Volume 3: O’er His Grave the grass Grew Green – Tragic Ballads

No.	Title	Artist	Length
1.	"The Holland Handkerchief" (Roud 246; Child 272)	Packie Manus Byrne	5:53
2.	"The Bonny Boy" (Roud 31; Laws O35)	Fred Jordan	3:35
3.	"What Put the Blood?" (Roud 200; Child 13)	Paddy Tunney	3:54
4.	"Worcester City" (Roud 218; Laws P30)	Joseph Taylor	2:45
5.	"Willie, The Bold Sailor Boy" (Roud 273; Laws K12)	Liz Jefferies	4:10
6.	"The Clattering Of The Clyde Waters" (Roud 91; Child 216)	Stanley Robertson	4:57
7.	"Young Edmund In The Lowlands Low" (Roud 183; Laws M34)	Geordie Hanna	5:22
8.	"The Prickle Holly-Bush" (Roud 144;Child 95)	Fred Hewett	3:32
9.	"Lord Ronald" (Roud 10; Child 12)	John MacDonald & Accordion	3:08
10.	"Newry Town" (Roud 490; Laws L12)	Jumbo Brightwell	2:44
11.	"Cruel Lincoln" (Roud 6; Child 93)	Ben Butcher	2:58
12.	"Maria Marten" (Roud 18814)	Freda Palmer	1:51
13.	"The Cruel Mother" (Roud 9; Child 20)	Lizzie Higgins	2:26
14.	"Lady Margaret" (Roud 50; Child 77)	Paddy Tunney	4:57
15.	"The Well Below The Valley" (Roud 2335; Child 21)	John Reilly	3:17
16.	"The Dewie Dens Of Yarrow" (Roud 13; Child 214)	John MacDonald	2:06
17.	"Molly Vaughan" (Roud 166; Laws O36)	Phoebe Smith	4:21
18.	"George Collins" (Roud 147; Child 85)	Enos White	2:37
19.	"The Two Brothers" (Roud 38:Child 49)	Belle Stewart	4:02
20.	"The Lakes Of Coalflin" (Roud 189; Laws Q33)	Scan Tester	3:15
21.	"Willie-O" (Roud 22567)	Nora Cleary	1:20

Volume 4: Farewell, My Own Dear Native Land - Songs of Exile & Emigration.

The tune tracks are 6 with fiddle and piano, 9 bagpipes and track 15 accordion. All the other tracks are songs unaccompanied except track 5 accompanied by banjo and tracks 13 and 18 by banjo and fiddle.

No.	Title	Artist	Length
1.	"The Green Fields Of Canada" (Roud 2290; Laws M6)	Paddy Tunney	3:38
2.	"Erin’s Lovely Home" (Roud 1427; Laws M6)	Mary Ann Haynes	2:42
3.	"Killyclare" (Roud 2939)	Eddie Butcher	4:20
4.	"Van Dieman’s Land" (Roud 221)	Walter Pardon	7:25
5.	"If You Ever Go Over To Ireland" (Roud 5277)	Margaret Barry	2:21
6.	"Farewell To Ireland / Unidentified" (Reels)	Michael Coleman	3:09
7.	"Brockagh Brae" (Roud 5171)	Geordie Hanna	4:58
8.	"Australia" (Roud 1488)	Cyril Poacher	2:15
9.	"Leaving St. Kilda" (Slow Air)	Willie Ross	2:55
10.	"Craigie Hill" (Roud 5165)	Paddy Tunney	4:25
11.	"She Lived Beside The Anner" (Roud 5687)	Tommy McGrath	3:26
12.	"You Boys O’Callieburn" (Roud 6932)	Willie Scott	5:18
13.	"Eileen McMahon" (Roud 9282)	Margaret Barry & Michael Gorman	1:42
14.	"Carrickmannon Lake" (Roud 5177)	Sarah Anne O’Neill	2:54
15.	"My Love She’s In America / Hand Me Down The Tackle" (Reels)	Michael Grogan	3:17
16.	"Erin’s Lovely Lee" (Roud 5327)	Willie Clancy	4:11
17.	"The Old Miser" (Roud 3913)	Chris Willett	6:41
18.	"Farewell, My Own Dear Native Land" (Roud 1455)	Margaret Barry & Michael Gorman	2:46
19.	"John Reilly" (Roud 270; Laws M8)	Sarah Anne O’Neill	4:42
20.	"Sweet Inishcara" (Roud 12923)	Paddy Breen	2:03

Volume 5: Come All My Lads That Follow the Plough - The Life of Rural Working Men & Women

Track 7 is a Morris dance tune with fiddle and vocals and track 25 is a dance tune on melodeons. All the remaining tracks are unaccompanied voice except track 9 accompanied by accordion, track 17 accompanied by fiddle and piano-accordion and track 21 accompanied by piano-accordion.

No.	Title	Artist	Length
1.	"Hopping Down In Kent" (Roud 1715)	Mary Ann Haynes	2:03
2.	"The Rocks of Bawn" (Roud 3024)	Joe Heaney	3:46
3.	"The Tarves Rant" (Roud 4847)	Davie Stewart	4:32
4.	"The Pleasant Month Of May" (Roud 153)	Sam Larner	1:57
5.	"Copshawholm Fair" (Roud 9139)	Bob Forrester	2:57
6.	"The Weaver’s Daughter" (Roud 1277)	Pop Maynard	1:39
7.	"The Maid Of The Mill" (Morris Dance tune)	Jinky Wells	0:59
8.	"The Grazer Tribe" (Roud 2998)	Straighty Flanagan	2:32
9.	"The Mains O’Fogieloan" (Roud 5148)	John MacDonald	1:57
10.	"We’re All Jolly Fellows As Follow The Plough" (Roud 346)	Fred Jordan	2:50
11.	"The Farmer’s Servant" (Roud 792)	Bob Hart	2:16
12.	"I am a Miller To My Trade" (Roud 888)	Davie Stewart	2:43
13.	"Four Horses" (Roud 12929)	Hockey Feltwell	2:00
14.	"Nicky Tams" (Roud 1875)	Jimmy McBeath	2:44
15.	"The Lark In The Morning" (Roud 151)	Paddy Tunney	1:04
16.	"Lovely Molly" (Roud 1446)	Lizzie Higgins	4:06
17.	"The Bonnie Labouring Boy" (Roud 1162; Laws M14)	Paddy Beades	2:57
18.	"The Barnyards O’Delgaty" (Roud 2136)	Jimmy McBeath	2:42
19.	"The Rich Lady Gay" (Roud 1714)	Harry Upton	4:15
20.	"The Cranbally Farmer" (Roud 6978)	Tom Leninan	3:01
21.	"Wi’ Ma Big Kilmarnock Bonnet" (Roud 5861)	Willie Kemp & Curly MacKay	2:43
22.	"The Lads That Was Reared Among Heather" (Roud 5127)	Willie Scott	1:58
23.	"Tossing The Hay" (Roud 2940)	Eddie Butcher	2:10
24.	"Sleepytoon" (Roud 9140)	John MacDonald	1:35
25.	"Back O’ The Haggart" (Jigs)	The Hyde Brothers	2:55

Volume 6: Tonight I'll Make You My Bride - Ballads of True & False Lovers

No.	Title	{{{extra_column}}}	Length
1.	"The Raggle-Taggle Gypsies" (Roud 1; Child 200)	Walter Pardon	2:45
2.	"Hear's A Health to All True Lovers" (Roud 1235)	Belle Stewart	3:37
3.	"Another Man's Wedding" (Roud 567; Laws P31)	Eddie Butcher	5:56
4.	"The Maid of Ballymore" (Roud 2991)	Mary Ann Carolan	3:47
5.	"The Battle Of The Ewe Buchts" (Roud 82; Child 217)	Stanley Robertson	4:44
6.	"The Green Wedding" (Roud 93; Child 221)	Nora Cleary	4:13
7.	"Marrowbones" (Roud 183; Laws Q2)	Jimmy Knights	2:53
8.	"The Month of January" (Roud 175; Laws P20)	Paddy Tunney	3:07
9.	"The Forester" (Roud 67; Child 110)	Lizzie Higgins	3:13
10.	"The Maid and the Magpie" (Roud 1532)	Cyril Poacher	2:29
11.	"Yong Ellender" (Roud 1417)	Phoebe Smith	4:48
12.	"Colin and Phoebe" (Roud 512)	George 'Pop' Maynard	3:31
13.	"Matt Highland" (Roud 2880)	Liz Jefferies	3:50
14.	"Molly Bawn" (Roud 166; Laws O36)	Packie Manus Byrne	5:33
15.	"Bold William Taylor" (Roud 158; Laws N11)	Joseph Taylor	3:47
16.	"The Bold Trooper" (Roud 311)	Nora Cleary	3:43
17.	"Kate of Ballinamore" (Roud 5172)	Geordie Hanna	3:06
18.	"The Laird o' the Dainty Doobie" (Roud 864)	Lizzie Higgins	2:55
19.	"Long A-Growing" (Roud 31; Laws O35)	Mary Ann Haynes	3:15
20.	"The Mountain Streams Where the Moorcocks Crow" (Roud 2124)	Paddy Tunney	5:05

Volume 7: First I'm Going To Sing You a Ditty - Rural Fun & Frolics

Track	Title	Artist	Instrument	Length
1	Herrings' Head (Roud 128)	John Doughty		3:12
2	Burke's Engine(Roud 9228)	Tommy McGrath		3:38
3	Untitled Scottische	Scan Tester	concertina	2:07
4	You Canna Put It On to Sandy(Roud 5143)	Jimmy McBeath		2:28
5	Ladybower's/The Sister(Reels)	Rose Murphy	fiddle	3:19
6	Three Sons of Rogues(Roud 130)	George “Pop” Maynard		1:40
7	Young Bob Riley(Roud 753)	Mary Ann Carolan		1:52
8	Uncle George's Hornpipe/Tommy Roberts’ Hornpipe	Bob Cann	melodeon	3:46
9	The Ball o’ Kerrimeer(Roud 4828)	John MacDonald		2:13
10	Widdlecombe Fair(Roud 666)	Tom Brown		3:19
11	Oh, The Hampshires Do Like Duff(Regimental March)	Sam Bond	mouth organ	1:02
12	A Nice Piece Of Irish Pig's Head(Roud 12932)	Maurice		2:19
13	Glendarel Highlanders(6/8 march)/Kenmure's On and Awa’(6/8 march)/Lovat Scouts(2/4 march)/Monymusk(Highland fling)	Curley McKay & Willie Kemp	piano accordion, vocals & trumpet	3:20
14	Clinking O'er The Lea(Roud 118; Child 279)	Maggie Murphy		3:18
15	The Derby Ram(Roud 126)	Sid Steer		3:01
16	Old King Cole(Roud 1164)	Michael Gorman	with chorus	2:36
17	Live performance – Bampton Bill	Bampton Morris with Jinky Wells	fiddle & voice	2:36
18	Down the Road(Roud 15128)	Fred Jordan		3:42
19	The Rosin Box(Roud 2501)	John Reilly		1:47
20	The Stack of Barley(hornpipe)	Ellen O’Dywer	concertina	1:28
21	Most Beautiful Leg of the Mallard(Roud 1517)	Henry Michelmore		3:02
22	The Keyhole in the Door(Roud 2099)	Jim Wilson	with chorus	3:02
23	The Blue Meadow(Reel)	Paddy Breen	tin whistle	2:45
24	The Varsoviana(original tune)The Varsoviana(later tune)	Ned Pearson	fiddle & vocals	2:44
25	The Old Sow(Roud 1737)	Albert Richardson		2:17
26	The Cod Fish(Roud 149)	Nora Cleary		1:49
27	Stirling Militia(march)/Ruthven House(strathspey/fairy dance(reel)	Will & Ian Powrie	accordion & fiddle	3:09
28	Up to the Rigs of London Town(Roud 868)	Charlie Wills		2:26
29	The Pigeon on the Gate(reel)	Jim & Seamus Donaghue	tin whistle & tambourine	2:05

Volume 8: A Story I'm Just About To Tell - Local Events & National Issues

Track	Title	Artist	Instrument	Length
1	Majuba Hill(Pipe March)	John MacDonald	accordion	0:50
2	A Broadside(Roud 492; Laws N4)	Bob Hart		2:27
3	The Wild Colonial Boy(Roud 677; Laws L20)	Margaret Barry and Michael Gorman	accompanied by banjo & fiddle	2:49
4	The Wife of the Bold Tenant Farmer(Roud 5164)	Joe Heaney		3:04
5	MacPherson's Rant(Roud 2160)	Davie Stewart	accompanied by accordion	6:05
6	The Young Horseman(Roud 1185)	Martin Howley		2:16
7	The Haughs o' Cromdale(Roud 5147)	John MacDonald	accompanied by accordion	1:20
8	The Aghalee Heroes(Roud 6546)	Robert Cinnamond		2:32
9	Young Jimmy Foyers(Roud 1941)	Sheila Stewart		2:44
10	A Grand Conversation With Napoleon(Roud 1189)	Tom Costello		4:49
11	The Glen of Aherlow	Lucy Farr	fiddle	2:12
12	Creeping Jane(Roud 1012; Laws Q23)	Joseph Taylor		3:02
13	Skibbereen(Roud 2312)	Freddy McKay		4:31
14	Bloody Waterloo(Roud 622)	Willie Scott		4:08
15	Down in the Town of Old Bantry(Roud 12938)	Tommy McGrath		2:01
16	Boulavogue(Roud 2356)	Davie Stewart	accompanied by accordion	3:45
17	Bonaparte's Retreat(set dance)	Bernard O'Sullivan & Tommy McMahon	concertinas	3:02
18	The Wind That Shakes the Barley(Roud 2994)	Sarah Makem		3:21
19	Hartlake Bridge(Roud 1729)	Jasper Smith		1:34
20	Morrissey and the Russian Sailor(Roud 2150; Laws H18)	Joe Heaney		3:49
21	The Bonny Bunch of Roses(Roud 664; Laws J5)	Cyril Poacher		2:34
22	Calvery(Roud 1148)	May Bradley		2:26
23	Michael Power(Roud 8141)	Straighty Flanagan		4:15
24	The Bold Fenian Men(Roud 9266)	Margaret Barry	accompanied by banjo	4:13

Volume 9: Rig-A-Jig-Jig - Dance Music of the South of England

Track	Title	Artist	Instrument	Length
1	Jenny Lind(polka)	Scan Tester & Rabbity Baxter	concertina & tambourine	1:59
2	The Flowers Of Edinburgh / Bobbing Around (Morris dance tunes)	Jinky Wells	fiddle & voice	3:10
3	The Yarmouth Breakdown(hornpipe)	Percy Brown	melodeon	1:08
4	The Italian Waltz	Oscar Woods	melodeon	3:09
5	The Boscastle Breakdown (stepdance)	The Boscastle & Tintagel Players	concertinas, cello & stepping	1:21
6	Shepherd's Hey(Morris dance tune)	Jack Hyde	mouth-organ	1:02
7	In And Out The Windows(polka)/ The Monkey Hornpipe	Scan Tester	concertina	3:08
8	Hands Across / The Four-Handed Reel	The Dorset Trio	fiddle, concertina & cello	2:18
9	Woodland Flowers / Uncle Jim's Barndance	Bob Cann	melodeon	4:07
10	Greensleeves(Morris jig tune)/Napoleon's March	Stephen Baldwin	fiddle	2:51
11	Over The Waves / The Cuckoo Waltz	Jimmy Dixon & Ron Whatmore	mouth-organs	2:10
12	Old Mrs Cuddledee	Walter Bulwer	mandolin-banjo	0:53
13	The Egg Hornpipe / The Shipdham Hornpipe / The Sailor's Hornpipe	Walter Bulwer	fiddle	3:30
14	Untitled Polka	Scan Tester & Rabbity Baxter	concertina & tambourine	2:33
15	Johnny's So Long At The Fair(Morris dance tune)	Arnold Woodley	fiddle	1:56
16	Over The Hills To Glory(Country dance)	Bill Kimber	concertina	2:18
17	Untitled Polka/Golden Slippers/Mick's Tune	Font Whatling	melodeon	2:41
18	The Irish Washerwoman / Garyowen / Rory O’More / St Patrick's Day(jigs)	Billy Cooper	dulcimer	2:27
19	The Italian Schottische	The Dorset Trio	fiddle, melodeon & cello	2:00
20	The Gypsy Hornpipe. Untitled Schottische	Stephen Baldwin	fiddle	2:00
21	Untitled Schottische	Scan Tester & Daisy Sherlock	concertina & piano	1:57
22	The Veleta / The Heel And Toe Polka	Percy Brown	melodeon	3:53
23	The Earl Soham Slog. Harkie Nestling's(stepdance tunes)	Fred Whiting	fiddle	4:13
24	The Manchester Hornpipe / Click Go The Shears	Ruth Askew & George Privett	melodeon & spoons	2:05
25	Sheep-Shearing. Untitled Polka	The Dorset Trio	fiddle, concertina & cello	3:18
26	Untitled Polka. Untitled Polka	Oscar Woods	melodeon	3:18
27	The Maid Of The Mill. Bacca Pipes / Jockey To The Fair. (Morris dance tunes)	Bertie Clark	fiddle	3:44
28	Nobody's Darling But Mine / Untitled( waltzes)/Quick- Step Medley	Jimmy Dixon & Ron Whatmore	mouth-organs	3:24
29	Live Performance on the streets of Minehead(The Boat is Tipping Over)	The Sailors’ Hobby Horse	melodeon & two drums	1:51

Volume 10: Who's That at my Bedroom Window? - Songs of Love & Amorous Encounters

No.	Title	Artist	Length
1.	"Seventeen Come Sunday" (Roud 277; Laws O17)	Bob Hart	2:33
2.	"Three Maidens to Milking Did Go" (Roud 290)	Fred Hewett	1:21
3.	"When I Was No But Sweet Sixteen" (Roud 5138)	Jeanie Robertson	1:21
4.	"Rolling in the Dew" (Roud 298)	George 'Pop' Maynard	5:02
5.	"The Bonny Wee Tramping Lass" (Roud 5129)	Willie Scott	4:14
6.	"The Old Petticoat" (Roud 12940)	Paddy Tunney	1:27
7.	"The Copshawholme Butcher" (Roud 167)	Harvey Nicholson	2:59
8.	"Adieu To All true Lovers" (Roud 22568)	John Reilly	3:23
9.	"The Bold English Navvy" (Roud 516)	Jimmy McBeath	2:58
10.	"Standing in Yon Flowery Garden" (Roud 264; Laws N42)	Sarah Anne O'Neill	3:46
11.	"Died For Love" (Roud 60; Laws P25)	Geoff Ling	2:03
12.	"Betsy Bell" (Roud 5211)	Belle Stewart	3:31
13.	"The Banks of Sweet Mossing" (Roud 1646)	Jim Swain	2:42
14.	"The Tan Yard Side" (Roud 1021; Laws M28)	Frank Quinn(accompanied by fiddle)	3:08
15.	"On The Banks of the Silvery Tide" (Roud 561; Laws O37)	Paddy Breen	5:33
16.	"The Banks of Red Roses" (Roud 603)	Lizzie Higgins	1:29
17.	"Blow The Candle Out" (Roud 368; Laws P17)	Jumbo Brightwell	2:38
18.	"The Factory Girl" (Roud 1659)	Sarah Makem	4:31
19.	"The Seeds of Love" (Roud 3)	George 'Pop' Maynard	3:54
20.	"Blackwaterside" (Roud 312; Laws O1)	Paddy Tunney	2:35
21.	"The Wind Blew the Lassie's Plaidie Awa'" (Roud 2574)	Jimmy McBeath	3:38
22.	"The Wandering Girl" (Roud 1691)	Freda Palmer	1:25
23.	"Captain Thunderbold" (Roud 1453)	Phoebe Smith	2:35
24.	"Let the Wind Blow High or Low" (Roud 308)	Walter Pardon	3:30
25.	"She Moved Through the Fair" (Roud 861)	Margaret Barry(accompanied by banjo)	4:53

Volume 11: My Father's the King of the Gypsies - English and Welsh Travellers & Gypsies

No.	Title	Artist	Length
1.	"The Yellow Handkerchief" (Roud 954)	Phoebe Smith	3:51
2.	"Sally Morrow" (Roud 526; Laws K11)	Harry Brazil	2:08
3.	"God Killed the Devil" (melodeon)	Lemmie Brazil	0:37
4.	"There was a Rich Farmer at Sheffield" (Roud 2638; Laws L2)	Wiggy Smith	3:44
5.	"Father Had a Knife" (Roud 850)	Jasper Smith	1:13
6.	"Sweet William" (Roud 273; Laws K12)	Phoebe Smith	6:01
7.	"The Haymakers" (Roud 153)	Levi Smith	1:04
8.	"One Penny" (Roud 393)	Levi Smith	0:48
9.	"Ove Yonder's Hill" (Roud 60; Laws P25)	Amy Birch	2:46
10.	"The Moon Shines Bright" (Roud 702)	Jasper Smith	1:09
11.	"The Basket of Eggs" (Roud 377)	Minty Smith	2:12
12.	"Will You Buy My Sweet Lavender/Love is Pleasing" (Roud 854/waltz)	Bill Ellson accompanied by mouth organ	2:25
13.	"Little Dun Dee" (Roud 176)	Mary Ann Haynes	1:59
14.	"The Breakdown/The Flowers of Edinburgh" (stepdance tunes)	Harry Lee fiddle	1:56
15.	"The American Stranger" (Roud 1081)	Chris Willett	2:34
16.	"The High-Low Well" (Roud 1697)	Wiggy Smith	1:41
17.	"Cock o' the North/Garryowen/Flowers of Edinburgh/Step it Away/The Girl I Left Behind Me" (mouth organ, voice & drums)	Jasper & Levi Smith	2:35
18.	"Down in the Meadow" (Roud 18829)	Jasper Smith	1:08
19.	"The Tan Yard Side" (Roud 1021; Laws M28)	Phoebe Smith	2:19
20.	"Mandi Went to Poove the Gri/Untitled Stepdance Tune/Gan You Rokker Romany?" (Roud 852)	Peter Ingram	2:01
21.	"A Blacksmith Courted Me" (Roud 816)	Harry Brazil	1:52
22.	"The Small Bird's Whistle" (Roud 199; Child 106)	Jasper Smith	1:55
23.	"The Female Drummer" (Roud 226)	Mary Ann Haynes	2:21
24.	"Once I was a Servant" (Roud 269; Laws K43)	Chris Willett	1:52
25.	"The Colour of Amber" (Roud 1715)	Mary Ann Haynes	1:15
26.	"The Squire and the Gypsy" (Roud 229; Laws O4)	Jasper Smith	0:55
27.	"Two Untitled Stepdance Tunes/Untitled Step dance Tune" (stepdancing/melodeon)	Tom Orchard with Tommy Orchard/Tom Orchard	1:14
28.	"The Game of Cards" (Roud 232)	Levi Smith	1:16
29.	"Royal Comrade" (Roud 189; Laws Q33)	Amy Birch	3:27
30.	"Georgie" (Roud 90; Child 209)	Levi Smith	1:25
31.	"The Young Officer" (Roud 21; Child 4)	Mary Ann Haynes	3:41
32.	"Under the Leaves" (Roud 127)	May Bradley	2:23

Volume 12: We've Received Orders to Sail - Jackie Tar at Sea & on Shore

No.	Title	Artist	Length
1.	"The Loss of the “Ramilles”" (Roud 523; Laws K1)	Jumbo Brightwell	3:24
2.	"Captain Coulson" (Roud 1695)	Paddy Tunney	3:48
3.	"A Sailor in the North Country" (Roud 1504)	George 'Pop' Maynard	1:21
4.	"Just as the Tide was A-flowing" (Roud 1105)	Harry Cox	3:24
5.	"The Ramling Sailor" (Roud 518)	Chris Willett	5:17
6.	"The Sailor's Alphabet" (Roud 21100)	Sam Larner	3:20
7.	"Coil The Hawser/Lord MacDonald" (Reels)	John Rea(dulcimer)	2:17
8.	"Nancy of Yarmouth" (Roud 407)	Cyril Poacher	2:28
9.	"Baltimore" (Roud 4690)	Johnny Doughty	2:43
10.	"The Willow Tree" (Roud 18831)	May Bradley	3:46
11.	"Come All You Men Throughout the nation(The Captain's Apprentice)" (Roud 835)	Harry Cox	2:41
12.	"My Mother's Last Goodbye" (Roud 9705)	James MacDermott	2:54
13.	"The Female Cabin Boy" (Roud 239; Laws N13)	Bob Hart	2:26
14.	"The Sailor Cut Down in his Prime" (Roud 2; Laws Q26)	Walter Bulwer(fiddle)	0:57
15.	"Up The Channel(Spanish Ladies)" (Roud 687)	Johnny Doughty	3:20
16.	"Jolly Jack the Sailor Lad" (Roud 1785)	George Ling	1:24
17.	"Farewell, lovely Nancy" (Roud 527; Laws K14)	Nora Cleary	2:37
18.	"Stowborough Town" (Roud 185; Laws K18)	Frank Verrill	4:31
19.	"Ships are Sailing/The Heather Breeze" (reels)	Gerry Wimsey(tin whistle)	1:39
20.	"Will You Marry Me" (Roud 573)	Johnny Doughty	3:06
21.	"Windy Old Weather" (Roud 472)	Tom Brown	3:37
22.	"The Bold Princess Royal" (Roud 528; Laws K29)	Harry Cox	3:52
23.	"Plenty Of Thyme" (Roud 3)	Cyril Poacher	1:42
24.	"The Streets of Port Arthur" (Roud 2; Laws Q26)	Johnny Doughty	2:32
25.	"The Lofty Tall Ship" (Roud 104; Child 250)	Sam Larner	3:16
26.	"Polly on the Shore" (Roud 811)	George 'Pop' Maynard with chorus	4:12

Volume 13: They Ordered Their Pints of Beer & Bottle of Sherry - The Joys and Curse of Drink

No.	Title	Artist	Length
1.	"John Barleycorn" (Roud 164)	Fred Jordan	2:46
2.	"Two Hundred Years A-Brewing" (Roud 12930)	Margaret Barry & Michael Gorman accompanied by banjo & fiddle	3:18
3.	"The Merchant's Son" (Roud 2153)	Davie Stewart with chorus	2:49
4.	"My Old Hat That I Got On" (Roud 475)	Tom Newman	3:19
5.	"The Real Old Mountain Dew" (Roud 938)	John Griffin accompanied by flute & piano	3:03
6.	"Coming Home Late" (Roud 114; Child 274)	George Spicer	4:30
7.	"Piper O'Neill" (Roud 5125)	Willie Scott	2:50
8.	"Bold Docherty" (Roud 2992)	Mary Ann Carolan	3:08
9.	"The Bottom of the Punchbowl/The Teetotaller" (Reels)	Donald Cumming(accordion) & Eddy Holmes(dulcimer)	2:55
10.	"When I Was a Young Man" (Roud 1165)	Wiggy Smith	1:09
11.	"I'm Often Drunk and Seldom Sober" (Roud 3135)	Davie Stewart	3:21
12.	"When Mursheen Went to Bunnan" (Roud 8145)	Micho Russell	2:29
13.	"When Jones's Ale Was New" (Roud 139)	Fred Jordan	4:13
14.	"The Bonnie Lass Who never Said No" (Roud 2903)	Jeannie Robertson	1:45
15.	"The Tinkler's Wedding" (Roud 5408)	Willie Kemp & Curly MacKay accompanied with accordion	3:16
16.	"The Cow That Drunk the Poteen" (Roud 5170)	Paddy Tunney	2:59
17.	"Young Maria" (Roud 1478)	Louie Fuller	2:11
18.	"The Drunken Piper/Highland Whisky/The High Road to Linton" (march/strathspey/reel)	Will Powrie accordion with piano	3:32
19.	"My Little Grey Horse" (Roud 393)	George Dunn	3:56
20.	"Paddy's Panacea" (Roud 3079)	Tom Lenihan	4:04
21.	"The Broken Pledge"	Michael Gorman(nephew)	1:12
22.	"Jock Geddes and the Soo" (Roud 5130)	Willie Scott	4:24
23.	"Live Performance"	Wassailers (Drayton)	2:56
24.	"The Barley Mow" (Roud 944)	George Spicer with chorus	4:07

Volume 14: Troubles They Are But Few - Dance Tunes & Ditties

Track	Title	Artist	Instrument	Length
1	Bonny Kate/Jenny's Chickens(reels)	Eddie Corcoran & Séamus Tansey	tin whistle & tambourine	1:58
2	The Herring(Roud 128)	Mikeen McCarthy		3:59
3	The Old Jolly Booger(Roud 19111)	Jack Elliott	with chorus	2:34
4	MacKenzies's Highlanders/The Inverness Gathering(pipe marches)	Willie Kemp & Curly MacKay	ocarina & piano accordion	3:25
5	The Leperchaun( Roud 5274)	Margaret Barry & Michael Gorman	banjo & fiddle	1:50
6	The Derby Miller(The Three Rogues)(Roud 138; Laws Q21)	Jumbo Brightwell		2:33
7	Tell Her I Am/Teviot Brig(jigs)	Will Atkinson	mouth organ	2:00
8	The Hungry Army(Roud 1746)	Walter Pardon		3:31
9	Hieland Rory(Roud 5146)	Jimmy McBeath		1:53
10	Old Joe, The Boat Is Going Over/Untitled Polka	Percy Brown	melodeon	3:26
10	The Pigeon on the Gate(step dance )	Font Whatling & Wattie Wright	melodeon & step dancing	3:26
11	The Barley Grain(Roud 164)	Austin Flanagan		5:56
12	The Heel and Toe Polka/The Morpeth Rant(country dance)	Ned Pearson	fiddle	2:01
13	Sing ivy(Roud 21093)	Charlie Potter		1:22
14	I Am a Donkey Driver(Roud 1147)	Harry Upton		2:04
15	The Queen of the Fair/The lark in the Morning(jigs)	Michael Grogan	accordion	3:03
16	The Ball O’ Kerriemeer(Roud 4828)	Willie Kemp & Curly MacKay	accompanied by piano accordion	3:18
17	The Pigeon at the Gate(step dance )/The next Song in the Program	Albert Smith	Jew's harp & vocals	3:01
17	Tiddlewink Old Man	Jasper Smith		3:01
17	Derby Derby	Minty Smith		3:01
17	We are the Peckham Boys	Ray Driscoll		3:01
17	Yonder Comes the Devil	Joe Jones		3:01
17	Old Brown sat in the Rose and Crown	Albert Smith		3:01
17	Climbing Up My Old Apple Tree/St. Patrick's Dayjigs	Jasper Smith		3:01
18	Off to California/the Greencastle(hornpipes)	Willy Taylor, Joe Hutton & Will Atkinson	fiddle, small pipes & mouth organ	3:12
19	Its Now’t to Do With Me Now(Roud 5315)	Martin Gorman		1:52
20	The Four-Hand Reel (a.k.a. The Pigeon at the Gate)	Phil Tanner		2:34
21	Johnny McIndoe(Roud 3390)	Jimmy McBeath		2:26
22	Old John Wallis(Roud 294)	Bob Brader		2:05
23	Ballydesmond/Knocknabowl(Kerry polkas )	Julia Clifford	fiddle	2:23
24	I Wish There Was No Prisons(Roud 1708)	George Spicer		1:09
25	the Inverness Gathering/Dornoch Links(pipe marches)	Donald Davison	mouth organ	3:27
26	I'm Going to be Mother Today(Roud 8093)	Johnny Doughty		1:42
27	A Parody (Roud 12926)	Unidentified & Margaret Barry	accompanied by banjo	4:07
28	the Soldier's Joy(reel)	Gargan's Athlone Accordion Band		3:10

Volume 15: As Me and My Love Sat Courting - Songs of Love, Courtship & Marriage

No.	Title	Artist	Length
1.	"Haste to the Wedding" (Morris dance tune)	William Kimber(concertina)	2:02
2.	"Queen Amang The Heather" (Roud 375)	Belle Stewart	3:43
3.	"Johnny Harte" (Roud 2929)	Jimmy Halpin	4:44
4.	"The Aylesbury Girl" (Roud 364)	George 'Pop' Maynard	3:49
5.	"The Half-Door" (Roud 5275)	Margaret Barry(banjo) & Michael Gorman(fiddle)	3:18
6.	"Green Grow the Laurels" (Roud 279)	Louie Fuller	2:01
7.	"Old Carathee" (Roud 3377)	John Reilly	1:45
8.	"The Blackbird" (Roud 387)	Diddy Cook(with Chairman & chorus)	3:23
9.	"Coochie Coochie Coo Go Way" (Roud 120; Child 281)	Jamsie McCarthy	2:30
10.	"I Wish, I Wish" (Roud 495)	Walter Pardon	1:21
11.	"What Can a Lassie Dae Wi' an Auld Man" (Roud 1295)	Jane Turriff	3:36
12.	"Johnny, Lovely Johnny" (Roud 6168)	Paddy Tunney	2:22
13.	"Lurgan Stream" (Roud 6881)	Mary Ann Connelly	3:15
14.	"I'll Marry and I Won't Be A Nun" (march or two-step)	Margaret Barry(banjo) & Michael Gorman(fiddle)	1:46
15.	"One Cold Morning in December" (Roud 1745)	Walter Pardon	4:21
16.	"Rosemary Lane" (Roud 12; Child 2)	Liz Jefferies	1:51
17.	"It Was Early, Early All in a Spring" (Roud 152; Laws M1)	Robert Cinnamond	4:40
18.	"Moorlough Maggie" (Roud 12939)	Stanley Robertson(with chorus)	3:38
19.	"Just As the Tide Was Flowing" (Morris dance tune)	Stephen Baldwin(fiddle)	2:13
20.	"The Wearing of the Britches" (Roud 1588)	Paddy Tunney	2:06
21.	"A Week Before Easter" (Roud 154)	Harry Burgess	3:36
22.	"I'm a Stranger in This Country" (Roud 3388)	Jimmy McBeath	2:32
23.	"The Banks of Sweet Dundee" (Roud 148; Laws M25)	Bob Brader	3:29
24.	"Sixteen Years, Mama" (Roud 1570)	Tom Lenihan	1:36
25.	"Bonny Tavern Green" (Roud 3110)	Paddy Tunney	2:50

Volume 16: You Lazy Lot of Boneshakers - Songs & Dance Tunes of Seasonal Events

Track	Title	Artist	Instrument	Length
1	The Nut Dance	The Britannia Coconut Dancers with The Nutters Band	Live Performance	4:59
2	Highland Mary(Morris Dance Tune)	Jinky Wells (of Bampton Morris)	fiddle & voice	1:45
3	The Quaker(Roud 3093)	Bampton Morris	Live Performance	2:33
4	The Pace-Egging Song(Roud 614)	Emma Vickers (of Burscough Pace-Eggers)	voice	3:27
5	The Happy Wanderer	The Merrymakers (Padstow)	Live Performance	2:17
6	While Shepherds Were Watching Their Flocks By The Night(Roud 16898)	George Dunn	voice	2:52
7	By The Bright Silvery Light Of The Moon/Highland Fling	Wrenboys (Listowel)	Live Performance	2:38
8	Double Set Back(Morris dance tune)	Bill Kimber (of Headington Quarry Morris Dancers)	concertina	1:16
9	So Now We’ve Gained Our Victory(Roud 12928)/ The Quaker(Roud 3093)	Mummers	voice & melodeon	3:36
10	Dublin Fair/ The Boys Of Wexford/ Garryowen	Wapping Irish Flute & Drum Band & Guest Pipers	Live Performance	3:05
11	The Girl I Left Behind Me(Morris dance tune)	Stephen Baldwin	fiddle	1:12
12	Live Performance	The Ripon Sword Dancers (Mummers)		3:20
13	Jockey To The Fair	Abingdon Traditional Morris Dancers	Live Performance	2:14
14	The Wassail Song(Roud 209)	Phil Tanner	voice	2:30
15	The Furry Dance	Helston Town Band	Live Performance	1:24
16	While Shepherds Watch Their Flocks By Night(Roud 16898)	Scan Tester	concertina	1:58
17	God Bless The Master Of This House(Roud 1066)	Frank Bond (of North Waltham Jolly Jacks)	voice	1:10
18	Where Does Father Christmas Go To?(Roud 12927)	Sam Bond (of North Waltham Jolly Jacks)	voice	2:34
19	Bobbing Around	Bampton Morris	Live Performance	2:26
20	Joe The Boat is Tipping Overtune	The Sailors’ Hobby Horse (Minehead)	Live Performance	2:28
21	The Waysailing Bowl	Billy Buckingham & Others	voices	2:45
22	The Great Little Army March	Widnes Star Novelty Band		2:53
23	Live Performance	Wassailers (Bodmin)	voices	2:15
24	Cock O’The North	The Abbots Bromley Horn Dancers	Live Performance	1:42
25	The Garland Dance No.3	The Britannia Coconut Dancers with The Nutters Band	Live Performance	2:33
26	Live Performance	The Merrymakers (Padstow)	The Sash	3:26

Volume 17: It Fell on a Day, a Bonny Summer Day - Ballads

No.	Title	Artist	Length
1.	"A Beggar Man" ((Roud 118;Child 279))	Lizzie Higgins	2:25
2.	"Lord Baker" ((Roud 40;Child 53))	John Reilly	7:23
3.	"Jack Hall" ((Roud 369;Laws L5))	Walter Pardon	3:10
4.	"The Bonnie Hoose o' Airlie" ((Roud 794;Child 199))	John MacDonald	2:27
5.	"Buried in Kilkenny" ((Roud 10;Child 12))	Mary Delaney	5:43
6.	"The Dowie Dens o' Yarrow" ((Roud 13;Child 214))	Willie Scott	4:53
7.	"Young Alvin" ((Roud 2988))	Packie Manus Byrne	7:20
8.	"The Mountain Stream Where the Moorcocks Grow" (Roud 2124))	Sheila Stewart with chorus	4:00
9.	"There Was a Lady Lived in the West" ((Roud 64;Child 100))	Robert Cinnamond	5:14
10.	"In Worcester City" ((Roud 218;Laws P36))	Harry Cox, 1958.	3:17
11.	"What Put the Blood" ((Roud 200;Child 13))	Mary Delaney	7:46
12.	"Lady Mary Ann" ((Roud 31;Laws O35))	Lizzie Higgins	1:49
13.	"Once There Lived a Captain" (Roud 3376)	John Reilly	3:01
14.	"The Gypsy Laddies" ((Roud 1;Child 200))	Jeannie Robertson, 1953.	6:08
15.	"Young Edmund" ((Roud 182; Laws M34))	Harry Cox	5:22
16.	"Barbara Allan" ((Roud 54;Child 84))	Sarah Makem, 1967.	6:53

Volume 18: To Catch a Fine Buck Was My Delight - Songs of Hunting & Poaching

Track	Title	Artist	Instrument	Length
1	While Gamekeepers Were Sleeping(Roud 363)	Bob Roberts	voice	2:05
2	On Yonder Hill There Sits A Hare(Roud 5173)	Geordie Hanna	voice	2:02
3	The Irthing Water Hounds(Roud 5692)	Willie Scott	voice	4:22
4	The White Hare(Roud 1110)	Joseph Taylor	voice	2:25
5	Out With My Gun In The Morning(Roud 1847)	Jimmy Knights	voice	2:15
6	The Huntsman's Horn(Roud 12920)	Big John Maguire	voice	3:57
7	The Hungry Fox (Roud 131)	Harry Burgess	voice	2:59
8	The Oakham Poachers(Roud 1686)	Wiggy Smith	voice	1:47
9	The Fox Hunt	Felix Doran	uilleann pipes & voice	3:16
10	Thornymoor Park(Roud 222)	Jasper Smith	voice	1:16
11	The Fair Of Rosslea(Roud 12935)	Philip McDermott	voice	3:17
12	Williarn Taylor(Roud 851)	Pop Maynard	voice	3:53
13	The Kielder Hunt(Roud 5126)	Willie Scott	voice	4:40
14	Hares In The Old Plantation(Roud 363)	Wiggy Smith	voice	2:10
15	Champion He Was A Dandy(Roud 21934)	Jack Elliott	voice	3:14
16	The Reaping Of The Rushes Green(Roud 3380)	Philip McDermott	voice	4:59
17	Bold Keeper(Roud 321; Laws M27)	Harry Brazil	voice	1:33
18	The House That Jack Built (Roud 12921)	Charlie Wills	voice	4:29
19	The Poachers’ Fate(Roud 793; Laws L14)	Walter Pardon	voice	4:34
20	Killafole Boasters(Roud 12922)	Jimmy Halpin	voice	3:08
21	The Huntsman's Chorus	George Tremain	melodeon	2:50

Volume 19: Ranting & Reeling - Dance Music of the North of England

Track	Title	Artist	Instrument	Length
1	Hexham Races / The Stool Of Repentance(jigs)	Will Atkinson	mouth-organ	1:57
2	The Gilsland Hornpipe(hornpipe)	Tom Hunter & Billy Ballantine	fiddle & piccolo	1:14
3	Untitled Hornpipe. Untitled (polka)	Ned Pearson	fiddle	1:58
4	Bonny North Tyne(waltz)	Billy Ballantine	piccolo	1:57
5	The Braemar Gathering /J.D. Burgess(pipe marches)	Willy Taylor	fiddle	2:27
6	The Friendly Visit / The Greencastle / The Lass On The Strand(hornpipes)	Will Atkinson	mouth-organ	2:50
7	Christie MacLeod / The Gallowglass Rant / Charlie Hunter(jigs)	Willy Taylor, Joe Hutton & Will Atkinson	fiddle, small pipes & mouth-organ	3:29
8	The Morpeth Rant(country dance)	Jim Rutherford	fiddle	1:13
9	The Oyster Girl – 1st Figure/The Lass Of Dallowgill – 2nd Figure.	Arthur Marshall & The Loftus Sword Dancers	melodeon	4:04
10	Willy Taylor's Polka/There's Nae Good Luck(jig)	Willy Taylor	fiddle	2:03
11	The Pop Along Polka	Willy Taylor	accordion	1:18
12	Mrs. Jamieson's Favourite (slow air)/ Parnell's March	Willy Taylor, Joe Hutton & Will Atkinson	fiddle, small pipes & mouth-organ	4:33
13	The Polka Mazurka/Paddle Your Own Canoe(quadrille tune)	Ned Pearson	fiddle	1:59
14	Farewell To The Creeks(pipe march)	Will Atkinson	mouth-organ	2:16
15	Tom Hepple's Polka. The Tow House Polka	Adam Gray	fiddle	3:13
16	The Wild Rover / Copshawholm Fair / Yon Flowery Garden(waltz)	Rob Forrester with Alf Adamson's Band	mouth-organ	2:31
17	J.B.Milne (reel)/ The New High Level(fast hornpipe)	Will Atkinson	mouth-organ	3:11
18	The Tenpenny Bit / The Rakes Of Kildare / I Lost My Love And I Care Not.(jigs)/Untitled Reel	Davie Rogerson	fiddle	3:24
19	Rosalie, The Prairie Flower. My Lodging / Blow The Wind Southerly	Billy Ballantine & Jimmy Hunter	piccolo & mouth-organ	2:45
20	Corn-Rigs/Untitled Jig For The Sylph 1/Untitled Jig For The Sylph 2(country dances)	Ned Pearson	fiddle	2:48
21	Longueval(waltz)	Will Atkinson	mouth-organ	2:20
22	The Kielder Schottische (The Lad with the Plaidie)	Jake Hutton, Tom Hunter & Billy Ballantine	two fiddles & piccolo	1:38
23	The Sylph(country dance)/Proudlock's Hornpipe	Billy Ballantine	piccolo	2:15
24	The Highland Laddie(country dance)/The Pin Reel(tune: The Fiery Clock Face)(country dance)/The Cambo March	Ned Pearson	fiddle	3:36
25	A.M.Shinnie / The Hogmaney Jig / Elizabeth Adair(jigs)	Will Atkinson	mouth-organ	4:00
26	Untitled Hornpipe. The Swallow's Tail(reel)	Davie Rogerson	fiddle	1:52
27	The Ideal Schottische(tune: Jack Thompson's Fancy)	The Cheviot Ranters	band	4:07
28	Kelso Accordion And Fiddle Club / Linda McFarlane / The Scairlaveg(marches)	Willy Taylor, Joe Hutton & Will Atkinson	fiddle, small pipes & mouth-organ	4:33

Volume 20: There is a Man Upon the Farm - Working Men & Women in Song

Track	Title	Artist	Instrument	Length
1	The Overgate(Roud 866)	Belle Stewart	voice	3:16
2	The Wee Weaver(Roud 3378)	Paddy Tunney	voice	1:49
3	We Shepherds Are The Best of Men(Roud 284)	Fred Jordan	voice	3:05
4	The Job Of Journeywork)	The Belhavel Trio	fiddle, uilleann pipes & accordion	3:03
5	The Flies Are on the Tummits (Roud 1376)	Ted Laurence	voice	2:02
6	Come All You Tramps and Hawkers(Roud 1874)	Jimmy MacBeath	voice	3:37
7	Muddley Barracks(Roud 1735)	Jumbo Brightwell	voice	2:21
8	The Shepherd's Song(Roud 5124)	Willie Scott	voice	4:19
9	In The Bar-Room(Roud 3486)	Jack Elliott	voice with chorus	2:22
10	An Spailpin Finach (The Migrant Labourer)	Sean Mac Donnchadna	voice	2:10
11	Come To The Hiring(Roud 12936)	Jamesy McCarthy	voice	2:30
12	The Wandering Shepherd Laddie(Roud 5150)	John MacDonald	voice & accordion	1:22
13	There Was A Poor Thresherman(Roud 19)	Harry Holman	voice	1:45
14	The Neatly Thatched Cabin(Roud 8121)	Big John Maguire	voice	2:10
15	The Banks Of The Dee(Roud 3484)	Jack Elliott	voice with chorus	2:34
16	My Father's A Hedger And Ditcher(Roud 846)	Mary Ann Carolan	voice	1:08
17	Ground For The Floor(Roud 1269)	Pop Maynard	voice	4:51
18	Airlin's Fine Braes(Roud 517)	Jimmy MacBeath	voice	2:05
19	The Little Ball Of Yarn(Roud 1404)	Mary Ann Haynes	voice	2:14
20	To Reap And Mow The Hay(Roud 12937)	Paddy & Jimmy Halpin	voices	5:21
21	The Roaming Journeyman(Roud 360)	Tom Willett	voice	1:53
22	When The Kye Comes Hame(Roud 12919)	Willie Scott	voice	4:13
23	The Berry Fields O’Blair(Roud 2154)	Belle Stewart	voice	2:31

=== The Voice of the People – A Selection from the Series of Anthologies ===
This album released in 1998 contains one track from each of the first twenty volumes of the series.

The Voice of the People

Track	Title/Original Album	Artist	Instrument	Length
1	When a Man's in Love He Feels No Cold( Roud 990; Laws O20)	Paddy Tunney		3.32
	Volume 1: Come Let us Buy the Licence - Songs of Courtship & Marriage			
2	In Scarborough Town(Roud 185; Laws K18)	Sam Larner		4:07
	Volume 2: My Ship Shall Sail the Ocean - Songs of Tempest & Sea Battles, Sailor Lads & Fishermen			
3	The Two Brothers(Roud 38; Child 49)	Belle Stewart		4:02
	Volume 3: O’er His Grave the grass Grew Green - Tragic Ballads			
4	Farewell, My Own Dear Native Land(Roud 1455)	Margaret Barry & Michael Gorman	banjo & fiddle	2:46
	Volume 4: Farewell, My Own Dear Native Land - Songs of Exile & Emigration			
5	The Rocks Of Bawn(Roud 3024)	Joe Heaney		3:46
	Volume 5: Come All My Lads That Follow the Plough - The Life of Rural Working Men & Women			
6	Bold William Taylor(Roud 158; Laws N11)	Joseph Taylor		3:47
	Volume 6: Tonight I'll Make You My Bride - Ballads of True & False Lovers			
7	Up to the Rigs of London Town(Roud 868)	Charlie Wills		2:26
	Volume 7: First I'm Going To Sing You a Ditty - Rural Fun & Frolics			
8	The Wind That Shakes the Barley(Roud 2994)	Sarah Makem		3:21
	Volume 8: A Story I'm Just About To Tell - Local Events & National Issues			
9	Untitled Polka	Scan Tester & Rabbity Baxter	concertina & tambourine	2:33
	Volume 9: Rig-A-Jig-Jig – Dance Music of the South of England			
10	The Seeds of Love(Roud 3)	George 'Pop' Maynard		3:54
	Volume 10: Who's That at my Bedroom Window? - Songs of Love & Amorous Encounters			
11	The Tan Yard Side(Roud 1021; Laws M28)	Phoebe Smith		2:19
	Volume 11: My Father's the King of the Gypsies – English & Welsh Travellers & Gypsies			
12	Just as the Tide was A-flowing(Roud 1105)	Harry Cox		3:24
	Volume 12: We've Received Orders to Sail – Jack Tar at Sea & on Shore			
13	I'm Often Drunk and Seldom Sober(Roud 3135)	Davie Stewart		3:21
	Volume 13: They Ordered Their Pints of Beer & Bottle of Sherry – The Joys & Curse of Drink			
14	The Four-Hand Reel (a.k.a. The Pigeon at the Gate)	Phil Tanner		2:34
	Volume 14: Troubles They Are But Few – Dance Tunes & Ditties			
15	I'm a Stranger in This Country(Roud 3388)	Jimmy McBeath		2:32
	Volume 15: As Me and My Love Sat Courting – Songs of Love, Courtship & Marriage			
16	Joe The Boat is Tipping Over(tune)	The Sailors’ Hobby Horse (Minehead)	Live Performance	2:28
	Volume 16: You Lazy Lot of Boneshakers – Songs & Dance Tunes of Seasonal Events			
17	The Gypsy Laddies(Roud 1; Child 200)	Jeannie Robertson		6:08
	Volume 17: It Fell on a Day, a Bonny Summer Day - Ballads			
18	The Poachers’ Fate(Roud 793; Laws L14)	Walter Pardon		4:34
	Volume 18: To Catch a Fine Buck Was My Delight – Songs of Hunting & Poaching			
19	Hexham Races / The Stool Of Repentance(jigs)	Will Atkinson	mouth-organ	1:57
	Volume 19 Ranting & Reeling – Dance Music of the North of England			
20	We Shepherds Are The Best of Men(Roud 284)	Fred Jordan		3:05
	Volume 20: There is a Man Upon the Farm – Working Men & Women in Song			

=== Second series ===
TSCD671 You Never Heard So Sweet : Songs by Southern English Traditional Singers.

No.	Title	Artist	Length
1.	"The Bold Princess Royal" (Roud 528; Laws K29)	Ned Adams	2:50
2.	"Heave On The Trawl" (Roud 1788)	Joe Spicer	1:56
3.	"Caroline and her Young Sailor" (Roud 553; Laws N17)	Lily Cook	4:28
4.	"Down by the Seaside" (Roud 1712)	George (Pop) Maynard	2:35
5.	"The Bonny Bunch of Roses O" (Roud 664; Laws J5))	Noah Gillett	4:41
6.	"The Birds in the Spring" (Roud 356)	Bob & Ron Copper	1:42
7.	"The Pretty Ploughboy" (Roud 186; Laws M24)	George Burton	1:20
8.	"The Lark in the Morning" (Roud 151)	Lily Cook	1:51
9.	"Dame Durden" (Roud 1209)	Luther Hills & Mark Fuller	2:09
10.	"Spencer the Rover" (Roud 1115)	Jim Barrett	3:29
11.	"Jim the Carter Lad" (Roud 1080)	Jim Swain	2:03
12.	"Six Jolly Miners" (Roud 877)	Turp Brown	1:40
13.	"While Jones's Ale Was New" (Roud 139)	Fred Hewett	1:55
14.	"Old Johnny Buckle" (Roud 19111)	Mrs. Hewett(sister of Enos White)	1:18
15.	"The Broken-Down Gentleman" (Roud 383)	George Attrill	2:33
16.	"Cloddy Banks" (Roud 266; Laws N40)	George (Pop) Maynard	4:46
17.	"The Bold Dragoon" (Roud 321; Laws M27)	Enos White	1:58
18.	"Lemany" (Roud 193)	Jim Copper	2:24
19.	"Deep In Love" (Roud 18829)	Gladys Stone	3:06
20.	"The Foggy Dew" (Roud 558; Laws O3))	Luther Hills with Mark Fuller	2:30
21.	"The Folkestone Murder" (Roud 897)	George Spicer	3:50
22.	"Canada-ee-i-o" (Roud 309)	Harry Upton	2:30
23.	"The Silver Pin" (Roud 573)	Lottie Chapman	2:17
24.	"The Bold Trooper" (Roud 311)	Frank Cole	5:27
25.	"The Moon Shines Bright" (Roud 702)	Albert Beale	1:39
26.	"Shepherds Arise!" (Roud 1207)	Bob & Ron Copper	3:34

TSCD672D I’m a Romany Rai : Songs by Southern English Gypsy Traditional Singers.

CD1 I were Borned in an Old Gypsy Wagon
No.	Title	Artist	Length
1.	"I’m A Romany Rai" (Roud 4844)	Phoebe Smith	1:55
2.	"The Roving Journeyman" (Roud 360)	Tom Willett	2:01
3.	"Won’t You Buy My Sweet Blooming Lavender" (Roud 854)	Janet Penfold	1:25
4.	"The Banks of the Sweet Primroses" (Roud 586)	Rebecca Penfold	2:51
5.	"How Old Are You, My Pretty Fair Maid?" (Roud 277; Laws O17)	Charlie Scamp	0:47
6.	"Oh, What a Life" (Roud 9683)	Mary Fuller	0:39
7.	"The Game of Cards" (Roud 232)	Wally Fuller	1:55
8.	"Come Father Build me a Boat" (Roud 273; Laws K12)	Charlie Scamp	3:05
9.	"Dear father, Pray Build me a Boat" (Roud 273; Laws K12)	Sheila Smith	1:48
10.	"High Germanie" (Roud 904)	Phoebe Smith	2:04
11.	"The Rose of Ardene" (Roud 2816)	Tom Willett	2:50
12.	"Meeting is a Pleasant Place" (Roud 454)	Rebecca Penfold	0:56
13.	"Briny O’Then" (Roud 294)	Jack Fuller	2:17
14.	"The Bold Drunkards" (Roud 1165)	Wally Fuller	1:38
15.	"The Little Ball of Yarn" (Roud 1404)	Chris Willett	1:56
16.	"Green Grow the Laurels" (Roud 279)	Jack Fuller	2:30
17.	"The Banks of the Sweet Dundee" (Roud 148; Laws M25)	Rebecca Penfold	4:05
18.	"Young Leonard" (Roud 189; Laws Q33)	Charlie Scamp	4:13
19.	"Down by the Sheepfold" (Roud 559; Laws O10)	Phoebe Smith	4:38
20.	"Thorny Park" (Roud 222)	Chris Willett	1:19
21.	"The Bold Poachers" (Roud 902)	Wally Fuller	1:34
22.	"Down by the Tanyard Side" (Roud 1021; Laws M28)	Tom & Chris Willett	3:31
23.	"I Am a Man That’s Done Wrong to My Parents" (Roud 1386)	Wally Fuller	2:11
24.	"Barbary Allen" (Roud 54; Child 84)	Charlie Scamp	5:28
25.	"A Blacksmith Courted Me" (Roud816)	Charlie Scamp	1:10
26.	"A Blacksmith Courted Me" (Roud 816)	Phoebe Smith	5:35

CD2 Caroline Hughes and her family
No.	Title	Artist	Length
1.	"The Soldier and the Lady" (Roud 140; Laws P14)	Carolyne Hughes	2:30
2.	"The Sprig of Thyme" (Roud 3)	Carolyne Hughes	2:16
3.	"A Blacksmith Courted Me" (Roud 816)	Carolyne Hughes	2:31
4.	"The London Murder" (Roud 263: Laws P35)	Carolyne Hughes	2:44
5.	"As I Was a Walking One May Summer's Morning" (Roud 586)	Carolyne Hughes & Daughter	2:06
6.	"Once I Had a Colour" (Roud 954)	Carolyne Hughes	2:13
7.	"My Father He Built Me A Shady Bower" (Roud; Child 106)	Carolyne Hughes	3:19
8.	"Georgie" (Roud 90; Child 209)	Carolyne Hughes	1:13
9.	"Young Willie" (Roud 945)	Carolyne Hughes	1:31
10.	"My Black Dog and Sheep Crook" (Roud 948)	Carolyne Hughes	0:48
11.	"If I Were a Blackbird" (Roud 387)	Carolyne Hughes	1:53
12.	"Down By The Old Riverside" (Roud 564; Laws P18)	Carolyne Hughes	1:48
13.	"A Wager, a Wager" (Roud 564; Child 43)	Carolyne Hughes	2:15
14.	"The Break of Briars" (Roud 18; Laws M32)	Carolyne Hughes	1:16
15.	"The Bird in the Bush" (Roud 290)	Carolyne Hughes	1:19
16.	"Flash Girls and Airy" (Roud 277; LawsO17)	Carolyne Hughes	0:55
17.	"The Game of Cards" (Roud 232)	Carolyne Hughes	1:34
18.	"Catch Me, Bold Rogue, If You Can" (Roud 2638; Laws L2)	Carolyne Hughes	1:57
19.	"Jealousy Thoughts" (Roud 218; Laws P30)	Celia Warren	1:56
20.	"The Long Lost Child" (Roud 1549)	John Hughes	1:57
21.	"Henry My Son" (Roud 10; Child 12)	Carrie Hughes	1:56
22.	"Barbry Allen" (Roud 54; Child 84)	John Hughes	2:42
23.	"Billy Boy" (Roud 326; Child 12 appendix)	Carolyne Hughes & daughter	1:04
24.	"The Cuckoo" (Roud 413;)	Carolyne Hughes	2:18
25.	"Died for Love" (Roud 60; Laws P25)	Carolyne Hughes	1:42
26.	"Lord Thomas and Fair Ellender" (Roud 4; Child 73)	Carolyne Hughes	1:41
27.	"The Little Boy" (Roud 45; Child 65)	Carolyne Hughes	2:49
28.	"Adieu to Old England" (Roud 1703)	Carolyne Hughes	1:19
29.	"The Butcher Boy" (Roud 409; Laws P24)	Carolyne Hughes	2:14
30.	"My Truelove Was a Sailor Lad" (Roud 60; Laws P25)	Carolyne Hughes	2:03
31.	"Meet Me Tonight in the Moonlight" (Roud 767)	Carolyne Hughes	1:42
32.	"Tuning"		0:58
33.	"The Draggle -Tail Gypsies" (Roud 1; Child 200)	Carolyne Hughes	1:03

TSCD673T Good People, Take Warning : Ballads by British and Irish Traditional Singers.

Selected by Steve Roud.

CD1
No.	Title	Artist	Length
1.	"The Bold Fisherman" (Roud 291; Laws O24)	Bob & Ron Copper	3:37
2.	"The Boston Smuggler" (Roud 261; Laws L16)	Jean Elvin	4:05
3.	"Doran's Ass" (Roud 1010; Laws Q19)	Maggie Chambers(Murphy)	1:50
4.	"Molly Bawn" (Roud 166; Laws O36)	Bess Cronin	2:11
5.	"Seven Yellow Gypsies" (Roud 1; Child 200)	Paddy Doran	1:35
6.	"In Sheffield Park" (Roud 860)	Ben Butcher	1:39
7.	"The Braes o' Strathblane" (Roud 1096)	Maggie Stewart	4:05
8.	"The Bonny Bunch of Roses" (Roud 664; Laws J5)	Phil Tanner	3:09
9.	"Johnnie Cock" (Roud 69; Child 114)	Jeannie Robertson	9:23
10.	"Holloman's Ivy" (Roud 21093)	Gabriel Figg	2:34
11.	"Caroline and the Sailor" (Roud 553; Laws N17)	Sarah Makem	4:17
12.	"The Jolly Beggar" (Roud 118; Child 279)	Lucy Stewart	1:18
13.	"The Blind Beggar's Daughter" (Roud 132; Laws N27)	Thomas Moran	2:44
14.	"Her Mantle So Green" (Roud 714; Laws N38)	Thomas Moran	2:44
15.	"My Father's Serving Boy" (Roud 1911; Laws M11)	Mick McAlinden	5:17
16.	"The Trip Over The Mountain" (Roud 9632)	Maureen Melly	1:39
17.	"The London Steamer" (Roud 17760)	Sam Larner	2:13
18.	"The Oxford Girl" (Roud 263; Laws P35)	Phoebe Smith	4:13
19.	"When I Was a Young Maid(The Female Drummer)" (Roud 226)	Margaret Jeffrey	3:41

CD2
No.	Title	Artist	Length
1.	"Blooming Caroline" (Roud 398; Laws P27)	Jean Evlin	6:17
2.	"The Crabfish" (Roud 149)	Harry Cox	2:31
3.	"Barbara Allen" (Roud; Child 84)	Bess Cronin	2:11
4.	"Jogging up to Cauldy" (Roud; Roud 6336)	Mary Toner	1:46
5.	"The Light Dragoon" (Roud 162; Child 299)	Harry List	1:42
6.	"The Golden Victory" (Roud; Child 286)	Dodie Chalmers	3:36
7.	"Her Servant Man" (Roud 539; Laws M15)	Gladys Stone	2:43
8.	"Captain Wedderburn" (Roud 36; Child 46)	Séamus Ennis	4:10
9.	"Our Ship She is Ready" (Roud 2995)	Sarah Makem	1:50
10.	"Willie and Mary" (Roud 348; Laws N28)	Paddy McCluskey	2:15
11.	"Two Pretty Boys" (Roud; Child 49)	Lucy Stewart
12.	"You Seamen Bold" (Roud 807)	Jim Copper	3:46
13.	"The American Stranger" (Roud 1081)	Jean Mathew	3:43
14.	"McCaffery" (Roud 1148)	Paddy Grant	4:01
15.	"The Blind Man He Could See" (Roud 183; Laws Q2)	Thomas Moran	1:49
16.	"The Maid of the Cowdie and Knowes" (Roud 92; Child 217)	Ethel Findlater	2:01
17.	"The Wreck of the ‘Northfleet’" (Roud 1174)	Harry Upton	4:54
18.	"Oxford City" (Roud 218; Laws P30)	Mary Doran	3:24
19.	"The Banks of Sweet Dundee" (Roud 148; Laws M25)	Joe Thomas	2:00
20.	"The Brig Columbus" (Roud 8098)	Dot Fourbiter	2:35
21.	"The Devil and the Baliff" (Roud 5294)	Michael Gallagher	1:48
22.	"The Moorlough Shore" (Roud 2946)	Jim O’Neill	3:30
23.	"Lord Bateman" (Roud; Child 53)	Charlotte Higgins	4:36

CD3
No.	Title	Artist	Length
1.	"The Banks of the Silvery Tide" (Roud 561; Laws O37)	Maggie Chambers(Murphy)	4:13
2.	"The Hungry Fox" (Roud131)	Bob and Ron Copper	2:25
3.	"The Twa Sisters" (Roud; Child 10)	Lucy Stewart	3:38
4.	"Handsome Polly" (Roud 545)	Thomas Moran	2:496
5.	"John McCann(Charming Mary Neill)" (Roud 142; Laws M17)	Peter Donnelly	6:25
6.	"The Gates o' the Drum" (Roud 247; Child 236)	Togo Crawford	2:35
7.	"The Dowie Dens o' Yarrow" (Roud 13; Child 214)	Mary Ann Stewart	5:46
8.	"The Squire and the Gypsy" (Roud 1628)	Harry Cox	2:26
9.	"Blow the Windy Morning" (Roud; Child 112)	Emily Bishop	2:10
10.	"The Banks of the Bann" (Roud 889; Laws O2)	Joseph Higgins	2:44
11.	"Hiring Time" (Roud 2516)	Michael Gallagher	1:43
12.	"The Bleacher Lassie" (Roud 3325)	Jean Mathew	2:08
13.	"Willie Lennix" (Roud 189; Laws Q33)	Joe Moran	2:49
14.	"Pretty Polly(The Cruel Ships’s Carpenter)" (Roud 15; Laws P36)	Sam Larner	3:59
15.	"Well Sold the Cow" (Roud 2637; LawsL1)	Elizabeth Cronin	4:32
16.	"Six Pretty Maids(The Outlandish Knight)" (Roud 21; Child 4)	Fred Jordan	3:58
17.	"Young George Oxbury" (Roud 90; Child 209)	George Bloomfield	1:34
18.	"Young but Growing" (Roud 31; Laws O35)	Mary McGarvey	2:56
19.	"Butter and Cheese and All" (Roud 510)	Leslie Johnson	2:57

TSCD674 Sarah Makem : The Heart Is True

All the tracks are sung by Sarah Makem and selected by Rod Stradling from recordings made in the 1950s and 1960s.

No.	Title	Length
1.	"As I Roved Out (Seventeen Come Sunday)" (Roud 277; Laws O17)	0:51
2.	"The Banks of Red Roses" (Roud 603;)	2:58
3.	"Barbara Allen" (Roud Roud 54; Child 84)	7:05
4.	"The Butcher Boy" (Roud 409; Laws P24)	4:49
5.	"The Canny Ould Lad" (Roud 183; Laws Q2)	3:49
6.	"Caroline and Her Young Sailor Bold" (Roud 553; Laws N17)	4:23
7.	"Derry Gaol" (Roud 896; Laws L11)	4:43
8.	"The Factory Girl" (Roud 1659)	4:50
9.	"Our Ship She’s Ready" (Roud 2995)	2:01
10.	"It Was in The Month of January" (Roud 175; Laws P20)	5:28
11.	"Jackets green" (Roud 9520)	3:28
12.	"The Jolly Thresher" (Roud 19)	3:03
13.	"The Laurel Wear(Cupid’s Garden)" (Roud 297)	2:54
14.	"Robert Burns And His Highland Mary" (Roud 820; Laws O34)	5:02
15.	"Mary of Kilmore" (Roud 2918)	3:26
16.	"A Servant Maid In Her Master's Garden" (Roud 264; Laws N42)	4:46
17.	"I Courted a Wee Girl" (Roud 154)	4:11

=== Third series ===
Good Humour for the rest of the Night

A selection of Dance Music in Northumberland and Cumberland

Track	Title	Tune Type	Artist	Instrument	Length
1	The Soldier's Joy	Country Dance	Ned Pearson	Fiddle	1:12
2	The Ribbon Country Dance	Country Dance	Ned Pearson	Fiddle	1:06
3	We All Go A-hunting Today	Waltz	Ned Pearson	Fiddle	1:05
4	Ned's father's Strathspey	Strathspey	Ned Pearson	Fiddle	1:00
5	The Ladies’ Hornpipe	Hornpipe	Ned Pearson	Fiddle	0:48
6	Barbara Bell	Country Dance	Ned Pearson	Fiddle	0:59
7	The Coquet Reel	Reel	Billy Ballantine	Piccolo	0:51
8	The Lads of North Tyne	Hornpipe	Billy Ballantine	Piccolo	1:35
9	The Mosstroopers Polka	Polka	Billy Ballantine	Piccolo	1:43
10	The Wild Hills of Wannies	Waltz	Billy Ballantine	Piccolo	1:08
11	My Love She's But A Lassie Yet		Bob Clark	Jews Harp	0:39
12	The Clinch Polka	Polka	George Taylor	Melodeon	0:40
13	The Clinch Polka	Polka	Bob Clarke & George Taylor	Jew's Harp and Melodeon	1:17
14	George Foreman's Hornpipe	Hornpipe	Geordie Armstrong	Fiddle	1:21
15	The Sylph	Country Dance	Geordie Armstrong	Fiddle	1:01
16	Highland Laddie	Country Dance	Geordie Armstrong	Fiddle	1:08
17	The Keel Row	Country Dance	Geordie Armstrong	Fiddle	0:40
18	The Heel and Toe Polka: Duncan Gray	Polka	Geordie Armstrong	Fiddle	0:52
19	Proudlock's Hornpipe	Hornpipe	Geordie Armstrong	Fiddle	1:23
20	Patrick Conroy's March	March	Billy Conroy	Tin Whistle	1:44
21	Patrick Conroy's Waltz No. 1	Waltz	Billy Conroy	Tin Whistle	0:57
22	Patrick Conroy's Waltz No. 2	Waltz	Billy Conroy	Tin Whistle	0:43
23	The Rollicking Irishman	Jig	Billy Conroy	Tin Whistle	0:38
24	Corn Riggs	Country Dance	Jake Hutton	Fiddle	1:00
25	Jake Hutton's Strathspey	Strathspey	Jake Hutton	Fiddle	1:04
26	Durham Rangers / The Rights of Man	Hornpipe	Tom Hunter	Fiddle	1:14
27	Circassian Circle: Good Humour		Billy Ballantine	Piccolo	1:10
28	The Time for Step-dancing		Billy Ballantine	Piccolo	1:00
29	Russian Ballet		Billy Ballantine	Piccolo	0:32
30	Nancy		Geordie Armstrong	Fiddle	1:12
31	Drops of Brandy	Country Dance	Geordie Armstrong	Fiddle	0:53
32	The Maltese Schottische	Scottische	Geordie Armstrong	Fiddle	0:45
33	Roxburgh Castle	Country Dance	Geordie Armstrong	Fiddle	1:09
34	The Lancers, figure 1		Billy Ballantine	Piccolo	0:42
35	The Lancers, figure 2		Billy Ballantine	Piccolo	1:30
36	The Lancers, figure 3		Billy Ballantine	Piccolo	1:18
37	The Lancers, figure 4		Billy Ballantine	Piccolo	0:55
38	The Lancers, figure 5		Billy Ballantine	Piccolo	1:54
39	The Last Figure of the Lancers		Billy Ballantine	Piccolo	1:24
40	The West End	Hornpipe	Jim Rutherford	Fiddle	1:11
41	Corn Rigs	Country Dance	Jim Rutherford	Fiddle	0:46
42	The Garden House	Polka	Jim Rutherford	Fiddle	1:14
43	Louden's Bonny Woods and Braes	Scottische	Jim Rutherford	Fiddle	0:54
44	The Gilsland Hornpipe	Hornpipe	Willy Taylor	Melodeon	0:39
45	Peter Robson's Polka	Polka	Willy Taylor	Fiddle	1:09
46	The Roman Wall	Jig	Adam Gray	Fiddle	1:07
47	Billy's Father's Polka	Polka	Billy Ballantine	Piccolo	0:58
48	The Circassian Circle: The Whinshields Hornpipe	Hornpipe	Billy Ballantine	Piccolo	0:53
49	The Circassian Circle: Whinham's Reel	Reel	Billy Ballantine	Piccolo	1:04
50	The Triumph	Country Dance	Geordie Taylor	Fiddle	0:29
51	Corn Rigs	Country Dance	Geordie Taylor	Fiddle	0:31
52	The Ribbon Dance	Country Dance	Geordie Taylor	Fiddle	0:26
53	Cock Your Leg Up		Geordie Taylor	Fiddle	0:39
54	The Self	Country Dance	Geordie Taylor	Fiddle	0:40
55	The Circassian Circle – first figure		Geordie Taylor	Fiddle	0:36
56	The Circassian Circle – second figure		Geordie Taylor	Fiddle	0:20
57	Roxburgh Castle	Country Dance	Jimmy Hunter	Mouth Organ	0:38
58	Caddam Woods		Jimmy Hunter	Mouth Organ	1:15
59	Jack Heron's Waltz	Waltz	Jimmy Hunter	Mouth Organ	0:53
60	The Circassian Circle		Jimmy Hunter	Mouth Organ	1:40

The Barley Mow – Field recordings and a film made in Suffolk

The album consists of a CD and a DVD of recordings made by Peter Kennedy in Suffolk during the 1950s and selected by Reg Hall.

The Barley Mow CD
No.	Title	Artist	Length
1.	"The Nutting Girl" (Roud 509)	Cyril Poacher	3:32
2.	"Nancy of Yarmouth" (Roud 407)	Fred Ling	4:05
3.	"Newlyn Town" (Roud 490; Laws L12)	Bob Scarce	5:00
4.	"Maggie May" (Roud 1757)	Geoff Ling	2:39
5.	"General Wolfe" (Roud 624)	Bob Scarce	6:02
6.	"The Yellow Handkerchief" (Roud 954)	Eli Durrant	3:27
7.	"The Oak and the Ash" (Roud 269; Laws K43)	Edgar Button	3:21
8.	"The Herring" (Roud 128)	Edgar Allington	2:41
9.	"The Northamptonshire Poacher" (Roud 299)	Jim Baldry	2:08
10.	"The Knife on the Window" (Roud 329)	Harry List	2:15
11.	"The Sailor and his Truelove" (Roud 660; Laws O30)	Arthur Smith	3:02
12.	"Muddley Barracks" (Roud 1735)	Jumbo Brightwell	2:18
13.	"Three Jolly Sportsmen" (Roud 17; Laws L4)	Bob Scarce	3:52
14.	"Blow the Candle Out" (Roud 368; Laws P17)	Edgar Button	2:22
15.	"Hares in the Plantation" (Roud 363)	Jim Baldry	3:10
16.	"Fagan the Cobbler" (Roud 872)	Wickets Richardson	2:06
17.	"The Broomfield Wager" (Roud 34; Child 43)	Cyril Poacher	4:59
18.	"Good Luck to the Barley Mow" (Roud 944)	Jack French	4:29

The film on the DVD has also been issued on the BFI DVD "Here’s a Health to the Barley Mow". The filming took place mainly on 19 November with some additional shots and part of The Nutting Girl on 10 December 1955 in the Ship Inn, Blaxhall.

The Barley Mow DVD
No.	Title	Artist	Length
1.	"Good Luck to the Barley Mow" (Roud 944)	Arthur Smith and Chorus
2.	"The Nutting Girl" (Roud 509)	Cyril Poacher with Fred Pearse(melodeon) and Chorus
3.	"Fagan the Cobbler" (Roud 872)	Wickets Richardson and Chorus
4.	"General Wolfe" (Roud 624)	Bob Scarce
5.	"Pigeon on the Gate" (Step Dance)	Fred Pearse(melodeon) and Step Dancers
6.	"National Anthem of Great Britain"	The Company

The Flax in Bloom Traditional songs, airs & dance music in Ulster

The album consists of three CDs recorded by Peter Kennedy and Sean O’Boyle in 1952 and 1953.

CD1

The CD contains a mixture of dance tunes and songs from the two counties, Fermanagh and Donegal

Track	Title	Artist	Instrument	Length
1	Lough Erne Shore(Roud 3476)	Paddy Tunney	voice	2:04
2	The Mountain Streams Where The Moorcocks Crow(Roud 2124)	Brigid Tunney	voice	3:54
3	Untitled Polka	Joe Tunney	accordion	1:04
4	Pat Hart's (single jig)	Joe Tunney	accordion	1:06
5	Miss Monaghan / The Gree Mountain / The Scholar (reels)	Joe Tunney	accordion	0:38
6	My Charming Buachall Roe(Roud 5730)	Annie Lunny	voice	1:54
7	Deartháirin ó mo Chroi(Little Brother of my Heart) (Roud 9286)	Annie Lunny	voice	2:36
8	Bundle and Go (single jig)	John Doherty	fiddle & voice	0:43
9	Miss McLeod's Reel	John Doherty	fiddle & voice	1:14
10	Gusty's Frolics (slip jig)	John Doherty	fiddle & voice	1:15
11	Moorlough Mary(Roud 2742)	John Doherty	fiddle & voice	4:27
12	Marry When You're Young (reel)	John Doherty	fiddle & voice	1:06
13	Boney Crossing the Alps	John Doherty	fiddle & voice	1:10
14	The Last Figure of The Lancers	John Doherty	fiddle & voice	0:58
15	The Rollicking Boys Around Tandragee(Roud 3106)	Mick Gallagher	voice	2:25
16	Buachaillin Donn(Roud 9258)	Maureen Melly	voice	2:04
17	Paddy Shinaghan's Cow(Roud 2924)	Maureen Melly	voice	1:32
18	Farewell Green Erin(Roud 2900)	Maureen Melly	voice	1:04
19	The Blackbird(Roud 2375)	Paddy Tunney	voice	3:39
20	The Loughanure Tune (reel)	Neilidh Boyle	fiddle & voice	2:25
21	Seán sa Cheo (reel)	Neilidh Boyle	fiddle & voice	1:32
22	Pleoid ar an Fharraige is i átá Morl(A Curse upon the Sea, it is it that is Great!)	Neilidh Boyle	fiddle & voice	1:51
23	Sráid na mBúrcach (The Street of the Burkes)(verse and air)	Neilidh Boyle	fiddle & voice	1:21
24	An Seanduine Dóite(The Dried Up Old Man)	Sheila Gallagher	voice	1:54
25	In Aimsir Bhaint an Fhéir(At Hay-Cutting Time)	Sheila Gallagher	voice	0:34
26	The Wearing of the Britches(Roud 1588)	Pat Bell Keown	voice	2:08
27	The Blackbird of Avondale(Roud 5174)	Maureen Melly	voice	2:13
28	My Dark Slender Boy(Roud 9706)	Maureen Melly	voice	1:20
29	Bonnie Kate (reel)	Simie Doherty	fiddle	0:53
30	Cuffe Street (reel)	Simie Doherty	fiddle	0:39
31	The Pigeon on the Gate (reel)	Simie Doherty	fiddle	1:11
32	The Tullaghan Lasses (reel)	Simie Doherty	fiddle	0:57
33	Mooney's Favourite (reel)	Simie Doherty	fiddle	0:58
34	The Heathery Hills(Roud 5295)	Brigid Tunney	voice	3:07
35	The Soldier and the Sailor(Roud 350)	Brigid Tunney	voice	1:22
36	Wee Paddy Molloy(Roud 5297)	Brigid Tunney	voice	1:33
37	The Atlantic Roar (hornpipe)	John Doherty	fiddle & voice	1:07
38	Rocking The Cradle(Roud 357)	John Doherty	fiddle & voice	3:26

CD2 Dance Music

Track	Title	Artist	Instrument	Length
1	The Basket of Oysters (highland) / Jackson's Rum Punch (jig)	Johnny Pickering	fiddle	1:44
2	Green Grow The Laurels O / Love, Will You Marry Me (highlands)	Johnny Pickering, Jimmy Pickering, Unidentified	fiddle, accordion & lilting	1:24
3	Biddy The Bowl Wife / I Lost My Love & I Care Not/ King of the Cannibal Islands (jigs)	McCusker Brothers Ceili Band		3:10
4	Untitled / Untitled / Jenny Lind (polkas)	McCusker Brothers Ceili Band		3:19
5	The First of May (reel)	Vincent & John McCusker	fiddles	1:03
6	3 untitled mazurkas	Vincent & John McCusker	fiddles	1:36
7	Monymusk / Kafoozalum / Maggie Pickens (highlands)	McCusker Brothers Ceili Band		3:10
8	Tatter Jack Walsh (jig)	Vincent & John McCusker	fiddles	1:00
9	The Princess Royal (set dance)	Vincent & John McCusker	fiddles	1:00
10	The Man from Newry (hornpipe) / The Barndance (barndance)	McCusker Brothers Ceili Band		3:10
11	Jockey to the Fair (set dance)	Vincent, John & Benignus McCusker	fiddles and accordion	2:05
12	The Orange Rogue (set dance)	John McCusker	fiddle	1:53
13	McKenna's / The Tinker's Apron / The Antrim (reels)	McCusker Brothers Ceili Band		3:16
14	The Sweets of May (single jig)	McCusker Brothers Ceili Band		3:17
15	The Gosson that Beat his Father (reel)	John Maguire	tin whistle	1:13
16	The First House In Connaught (reel)	John Maguire	tin whistle	1:21
17	Lovely Nancy (jig)	John Maguire	tin whistle	1:09
18	The Maid of the House (reel)	John Maguire	tin whistle	1:11
19	The Boys of Leefive (reel)	John Maguire	tin whistle	1:20
20	The Cuckoo's Nest (hornpipe)	John Maguire	tin whistle	1:21
21	All The Way To Galway (polka)	Paddy McLuskey	fiddle	0:41
22	Napoleon Crossing the Alps (march)	Paddy McLuskey	fiddle	0:59
23	The Cuckoo's Nest (hornpipe)	Paddy McLuskey	fiddle	0:52
24	The Ewe with the Crooked Horn (reel)	Paddy McLuskey	fiddle	1:06
25	Coming Home from Reilly's Party (jig)	Danny McNiff	flute	1:22
26	The Clap Dance / The Soldier's Joy	Eddie Moor	fiddle	1:02
27	Unidentified / Monymusk (highlands)	Philip Breen	fiddle	1:41
28	Woodland Whispers (waltz)	Philip Breen	fiddle	1:00
29	The Flax In Bloom / The Dairymaid / The Galway Rambler	Philip Breen	fiddle	3:09
30	The Sailor's Bonnet / Kiss The Bride / Roaring Mary (reels)	Sean Maguire, Liam Donnelly, Tom Turkington, Bill Montgomery & John Maguire	fiddles & tin whistle	3:05
31	The Flax In Bloom / The Millstone / The Dairymaid (reels)	Sean Maguire & Bill Montgomery	fiddles	4:28

CD3 recordings made of the Travelling People All the tracks are unaccompanied voice including the hornpipe.

CD3 Travellers

Track	Title	Artist	Length
1	The Dark-Eyed Gypsy(Roud 1; Child 200)	Christy Purcell	2:14
2	What Brought The Blood? (Roud 200; Child 13)	Mary Connors	5:04
3	I Am A Maid That's Deep In Love(Roud 231: Laws N12)	Lal Smith	3:16
4	Here's A Health unto All Truelovers(Roud 1235)	Mary Doran	4:06
5	Three Jolly Old Sportsmen(Roud 17; Laws L4)	Paddy Doran	2:06
6	The Lovely Banks of Lea(Roud 9493)	Mary Connors	4:05
7	The Bandy-Legged Mule(Roud 9217)	Christy Purcell	2:27
8	Marrow Bones(Roud 183; Laws Q2)	Mary Connors & Paddy Doran	2:25
9	Early, Early In The Month of Spring(Roud 152; Laws M1)	Lal Smith	4:01
10	The Lodging-House in Carrick-on-Suir(Roud 9228)	Christy Purcell	2:59
11	The Rambling Irishman(Roud 360)	Mary Doran	2:21
12	Dungarvan(Roud 9284)	Paddy Doran	1:55
13	The Bold English Navvy(Roud 516)	Lal Smith	3:04
14	The Little Beggarman (The Red-haired Boy)(hornpipe)	Paddy Doran	0:40
15	Going to Mass Last Sunday(Roud 454)	Winnie Ryan	2:10
16	Kate From Ballinamore(Roud 5172)	Paddy Doran	1:38
17	The Miles I Have Rambled(Roud 114; Child 274)	Mary Connors & Paddy Doran	1:05
18	The Fair At Spancil Hill(Roud 9292)	Christy Purcell	1:28
19	Come All You Loyal Lovers(Roud 9232)	Mary Connors	4:54
20	Early, Early In The Spring(Roud 18834)	Winnie Ryan	3:45
21	Blackwaterside(Roud 564; Laws P18)	Paddy Doran	2:23
22	I Wish I Was In Newross Town(Roud 16715)	Mary Connors	2:54
23	Nancy Hogan's Goose(Roud 9703)	Lal Smith	2:02
24	I Am a Poor Girl and My Life It Is Sad(Roud 387)	Winnie Ryan	3:51

Orkney - Traditional Dance Music From Orkney

Instrumentalists

Group	Artist	Instrument	track
	John Fraser	fiddle	
	Peter Pratt	tin whistle	tracks 12 – 16
		fiddle	tracks 29-31
	Bill Greave	fiddle	
	William Clyne	guitar	
	Tom Thomson	fiddle	
	Jim Leslie	piano-accordion	
	Ronnie Aim	fiddle	
	John Burgess	fiddle	
	Mary Ormand	fiddle	
	Billy and Jimmy Meil	fiddles	
The Garson Trio	Jimmy Garson	fiddle	
	Iris Nicholson	Piano-accordion	
	John Nicholson	guitar	
The Orkney Strathsey and Reel Society	Ronny Aim(leader)	fiddle	
		Several fiddles	
		possibly piano-accordion	Track 25
		Piano	
		Guitars	
The Anderson Brothers Band	Jim and George Robson	Fiddles	
	Alan, Robin and Jim Anderson	Piano-accordions	

Track	Title	Artist	Length
1	The Greeny Hill March	The Garson Trio	1:18
2	King William's March	The Garson Trio	2:03
3	The Garson Trio	The Victoria Waltz	3:31
4	Napoleon Crossing The Rhine	John Fraser	1:05
5	Rory O’More(Jig)	John Fraser	0:32
6	The Foursome Reel	John Fraser	1:07
7	Two Wedding Marches	John Fraser	2:45
8	Scapa Flow	The Anderson Brothers’ Band	1:08
9	Untitled Waltz	Billy & Jimmy Mell	1:26
10	Byrne's / The Elk's Festival(Hornpipes)	The Orkney Strathspey & Reel Society	1:42
11	Untitled / Untitled(Polkas)	The Orkney Strathspey & Reel Society	2:21
12	Two Quadrille Tunes	Peter Pratt	1:11
13	Miss Brown's Horning	Peter Pratt	0:43
14	The Morning Star	Peter Pratt	0:45
15	Kitty My Navel(Strathspey)	Peter Pratt	0:39
16	Paddy Carter(Barndance)	Peter Pratt	1:37
17	Bob Johnstone's Strathspey & Reel	Bill Grieve & William Clyne	1:39
18	Deerness Quadrille Tune	Tom Thomson & William Clyne	1:08
19	The Venus Polka	The Garson Trio	1:28
20	Off She Goes / Dumfries House / Unidentified(Jigs)	The Garson Trio	1:37
21	The Red House	Jim Leslie	0:45
22	The House On The Hill	Jim Leslie	1:05
23	The Glimps Holm March	Ronnie Aim & William Clyne	1:28
24	Untitled March	Ronnie Aim	0:43
25	The Grand March (No. 1)	The Orkney Strathspey & Reel Society	2:32
26	Smith's A Gallant Fireman(Strathspey)	John Burgess, Mary Ormand & Tom Thomson	0:42
27	Unidentified / Patience Quadrille(Quicksteps)	John Burgess, Mary Ormand & Tom Thomson	1:29
28	The Grand March (No. 2)	John Burgess, Mary Ormand, Tom Thomson & Jimmy Laird	1:18
29	Archie o’ Lamb Holm(Stathspey) /Unidentified(Pipe March)	Peter Pratt	2:00
30	The Bride's Reel	Peter Pratt	0:50
31	Tune for the quadrille (The Rose Tree)	Peter Pratt	1:02
32	The Monymusk / The Iron Man(Strathspeys)	The Garson Trio	1:40
33	The House of Skene(March) / The Four Stringer / MacDonald Black(Strathspeys)	The Garson Trio	4:37

=== Fourth series ===
On 16 March 2016 Topic Records issued 2 more albums in the series to commemorate the traditional music of the 'London-Irish'. These two albums were compiled by Reg Hall. Both albums consist of 3 CDs and contain collections or rare recordings from Topic Records own archive, the Peter Kennedy archive in the British Library and many private collections. The albums are:

It was mighty - The early days of Irish music in London

It was great altogether - The continuing tradition of Irish music in London
