= It Was Great Altogether =

Volume 30 : It was great altogether

Compilation album by Traditional Musicians
- Released: 2016
- Genre: Folk
- Length: 222
- Label: Topic Records
- Producers: Tony Engle & Reg Hall

It Was Great Altogether TSCD680T subtitled The continuing tradition of Irish music in London is the second album in the fourth series of The Voice of the People from Topic Records.

== Introduction ==
This compilation follows the development of London-Irish music from the 1950s to the present time and presents recordings from Topic records back catalogue and many private collections.

Reg Hall defines the booklet of the other compilation in the series, the 'London-Irish' as a distinct ethnic community of settled migrants and their offspring with topping up from a constant trickle of immigrants from Ireland. On this second compilation most of the musicians were raised in Ireland with a few from London, some of whom travelled to Ireland for holidays.

== The Compiler ==
Reg Hall has been active in Irish music in London since the 1950s having been invited by Michael Gorman to join his band in 1956. His involvement in documenting the phenomena continued when he co-produced Paddy in the Smoke with Bill Leader in 1968, recorded in The Favourite public house in Holloway. A number of other recordings followed as well as continuing to play in sessions around London.

A large number of the tracks selected feature him providing accompaniment on either piano or keyboard for the dance tunes.

== Packaging ==
The album consists of a cardboard case with a card CD holder for the three CDs and a booklet for the sleeve notes.

=== Cardboard case ===
The cardboard case does not detail the tracks in the compilation but does identify all the musicians and in the brief notes explains the place of Irish music in the lives of the migrant population in the 1950s. The notes then continue to explain that this album covers the period after the 1950s up to the present day.

=== Booklet ===
The booklet consists of 106 pages and follows a similar sequence to the other albums in the series.

- About the Editor – written by Tony Engle Managing Director of Topic Records
- The Voice of the People – Detailing the concept and philosophy of the series of compilations
- It Was Great Altogether – A commentary on the album and the social context of the Irish music within London. The first and second CDs cover music produced by the original migrants and the third is recordings made more recently with some older migrants together with second and third generation Londoners.

CD1, CD2 and CD3. These three sections details the tunes being played on the CDs together with a brief biography of each of the musicians and a history of the recordings in track order. Track lists. The track lists for the three CDs are listed with the artist details and running time.

== The Recordings ==
The album consists of three CDs of recordings made of London Irish Musicians who have worked and played in London from 1964 to 2014. The majority of recordings were made in London. Many of the recordings were made by private individuals with a number from various organisations and individuals including Bob Davenport, Bill Leader, Reg Hall, Peter Bellamy, Resonance 104.4 FM, RTÉ and Radio na Gaeltachta.

=== CD1 ===
The CD contains recordings from 1965 to 1998.

A number of the tracks on the CD were recorded in The Favourite, Holloway. 7 of the tracks recorded by Bill Leader in addition to the tracks on Paddy in the Smoke, with 2 other tracks recorded by Edward Tise.

Tom Cussen both plays on and records track 13.

Tracks 1 and 2 were originally released on the Topic records album Memories of Sligo which is available as a download.

Track	Title/Recording Details	Artist/| Instrument	Length
1	Tarbolton / The Longford Collector / The Sailor’s Bonnet(Reels)	Johnny Duffy(fiddle), Tommy Healy(flute), Reg Hall(piano).	3:10
1	Recorded by Tony Engle at Reg Hall’s house, Croydon, London, 15 February 1977.		3:10
2	Martin Wynne’s No. 1 / Martin Wynne’s No. 2(Reels)	Johnny Duffy(fiddle), Tommy Healy(flute), Reg Hall(piano).	2:50
2	Recorded by Tony Engle at Reg Hall’s house, Croydon, London, 15 February 1977.		2:50
3	Whelan’s / The Lark in the Morning(Jigs)	Jimmy Power(fiddle), Reg Hall(piano).	2:35
3	Recorded by Tony Engle at Tangent Studio, Shepherd’s Bush, London, 1 July 1976.		2:35
4	Jackie Coleman’s / The Castle(Reels)	Jimmy Power(fiddle), Reg Hall(piano), Gerry Wright, (bodhran).	2:13
4	Recorded by Tony Engle at Tangent Studio, Shepherd’s Bush, London, 1 July 1976.		2:13
5	The Flax-dresser(Highland)/ The Limerick Races(Single Jig)	Danny Meehan(fiddle), Michael Hynes(flute), Dermot Kearney(piano).	2:50
5	Recorded in the club room at the Empress of Russia, Islington, London, 25 April 1985.		2:50
6	Billy Brocker’s / The Humours of Tulla(Reels)	Michael Hynes(flute), Dermot Kearney(piano).	1:52
6	Recorded in the club room at the Empress of Russia, Islington, London, 25 April 1985.		1:52
7	Cherish the Ladies(Jig)	Danny Meehan & Bobby Casey(fiddles), Reg Hall(piano), John McLaughlin(spoons).	2:20
7	Recorded by Bill Leader at The Favourite, Holloway, London, 12 February 1967.		2:20
8	Lucy Campbell / The Bucks of Oranmore / Rakish Paddy(Reels)	Bobby Casey(fiddle), Andy Boyle(fiddle).	5:10
8	Recorded by Bill Leader & Reg Hall at Bill Leader’s flat, Camden Town, London, 19 April 1967.		5:10
9	Connemara Stockings / Ships Are Sailing(Reels)	Bobby Casey(fiddle), Tommy McCarthy(concertina).	1:50
9	Recorded by Bill Leader at Leader Sound Studio, Cecil Sharp House, Camden Town, London, 1972.		1:50
10	The New Century / Caroline O’Neill’s(Hornpipes)	Finbarr Dwyer(accordion).	3:02
10	Recorded in a private house in London, late 1960s.		3:02
11	Kitty in the Lane / Maude Miller(Reels)	Finbarr Dwyer(accordion).	2:25
11	Recorded in a private house in London, late 1960s.		2:25
12	The Mouse in the Cupboard / Happy to Meet, Sorry to Part(Jigs)	Jimmy Power, Paul Gross & Lucy Farr(fiddles), Tommy Maguire(accordion), Reg Hall(piano).	2:12
12	Recorded by Reg Hall at the Admiral Duncan, Deptford, London, 14 February 1965.		2:12
13	The Glenside No.1 / The Glenside No. 2(Polkas)	Maureen Minogue(fiddle), Tadgh Kearney(accordion), Tom Cussen(banjo), Jimmy Hogan(piano).	2:02
13	Recorded by Tom Cussens(sic) at Jimmy Hogan’s house, Finsbury Park, London, 1969.		2:02
14	Eddie Maloney’s / Lady Gordon(Reels)	Lucy Farr(fiddle), Tommy Healy(flute), Reg Hall(piano).	2:05
14	Recorded by Keith Summers in the club room at the Empress of Russia, Islington, London, 6 June 1985.		2:05
15	Sweet Flowers of Milltown / The Boys of Knock(Schottisches)	Lucy Farr(fiddle), Tommy Healy(flute), Reg Hall(piano).	2:29
15	Recorded by Keith Summers in the club room at the Empress of Russia, Islington, London, 6 June 1985.		2:29
16	The Knights of St. Patrick / Paddy in London(Jigs)	Jimmy Power(fiddle), Paddy Malynn(accordion), Frank Blaney(banjo), Reg Hall(piano).	2:01
16	Recorded by Edward Tise at The Favourite, Holloway, London, 14 June 1979, on the occasion of the filming of The Bolden Lad (director: John Tchalenko; music advisor: Bob Davenport).		2:01
17	The Humours of Tullycrinme / Mickie Callagher’s(Hornpipes)	Joe Whelan(accordion), Liam Farrell(banjo), Reg Hall(piano).	3:51
17	Recorded by Paul Marsh in the bar of the Waterman’s Arts Centre, Brentford, London, 15 February 1998.		3:51
18	The Siamsa(March)	Joe Whelan(accordion), Liam Farrell(banjo), Reg Hall(piano).	3:17
18	Recorded by Paul Marsh in the bar of the Waterman’s Arts Centre, Brentford, London, 15 February 1998.		3:17
19	The Fly in the Porter / Burning Brakes(Jigs)	Joe Whelan(accordion), Liam Farrell(banjo), Reg Hall(piano).	3:50
19	Recorded by Paul Marsh in the bar of the Waterman’s Arts Centre, Brentford, London, 15 March 1998.		3:50
20	The Pride of Rathmore / The Girls of Farranfore(Reels)	Con Curtin & Edmond Murphy(fiddles), Reg Hall(piano).	2:20
20	Recorded by Bill Leader at The Favourite, Holloway, London, 13 March 1968.		2:20
21	The Derrycrag / Tie the Bonnet / The Abbey Reel(Reels)	Con Curtin & Edmond Murphy(fiddles), Reg Hall(piano).	4:49
21	Recorded by Bill Leader at The Favourite, Holloway, London, 13 March 1968.		4:49
22	Strike the Gay Harp / Brendan Tonroe’s(Jigs)	Tommy Maguire(accordion), Father O’Keefe(mandolin), Reg Hall(piano).	2:47
22	Recorded by Bill Leader at The Favourite, Holloway, London, 21 April 1968.		2:47
23	The Stoney Steps / The Hare’s Paw(Reels)	Tommy Maguire(accordion), Father O’Keefe(mandolin), Reg Hall(piano).	1:54
23	Recorded by Bill Leader at The Favourite, Holloway, London, 21 April 1968.		1:54
24	The Carracastle Lasses(Reel)	Martin Byrnes(fiddle), Reg Hall(piano).	1:45
24	Recorded by Bill Leader at Reg Hall’s house, Croydon, London, 23/24 June 1967.		1:45
25	The Frieze Britches(Jig)	Martin Byrnes(fiddle), Reg Hall(piano).	2:44
25	Recorded by Bill Leader at Reg Hall’s house, Croydon, London, 23/24 June 1967.		2:44
26	The Heathery Breeze(Reel)	Sean O’Shea(fiddle), Bobby Casey(fiddle), Reg Hall(piano).	1:47
26	Recorded by Bill Leader at The Favourite, Holloway, London, 5 March 1967.		1:47
27	O’Callaghan’s / The Hare’s Foot(Reels)	Con Curtin, Denis McMahon & Julia Clifford(fiddles), Reg Hall(piano).	1:57
27	Recorded by Bill Leader at The Favourite, Holloway, London, 12 March 1967.		1:57
28	Cooley’s / O’Rourke’s / The Pigeon on the Gate(Reels)	John Whelan(accordion), Jimmy Power(fiddle), Tommy Healy(flute), Frank Blaney(banjo), Big John Gray(bodhran), Reg Hall(piano).	3:12
28	Recorded by Edward Tise at The Favourite, Holloway, London, 14 June 1979, on the occasion of the filming of The Bolden Lad (director: John Tchalenko; music advisor: Bob Davenport).		3:12

=== CD2 ===
The CD contains recordings from 1964 to 2014.

1 track was recorded by Lucy Farr in The Favourite, Holloway. Tom Cussen both plays and/or records on a number of tracks.

The musicians in the Thatch Ceili Band are Bobby Casey, Brendan Mulkere & Adrian Bourke(fiddles), Roger Sherlock & Paul Gallagher(flutes), Tommy Keane(uilleann pipes), John Bowe(accordion), Mick O’Connor(banjo), Kevin Taylor(piano), Mick Whelan(drums).

Track	Title/Recording Details	Artist & | Instrument/Original Release	Length
1	The Rakes of Clonmel / The Humours of Drimnagh / Castleconnor(Jigs)	The Thatch Ceili Band.	3:30
1	Recording studio, London, 1986.		3:30
2	The Four Courts / The New Copperplate(Reels)	Maureen Minogue(fiddle).	2:29
2	Recorded by Tom Cussen at Maureen Minogue’s house, London, 1969.		2:29
3	The Knocknagow(Jig)	Maureen Minogue(fiddle).	1:38
3	Recorded by Tom Cussen at Maureen Minogue’s house, London, 1969.		1:38
4	The Harlequin(Hornpipe)	Julia Clifford(fiddle), Billy Clifford(flute).	2:07
4	Recorded by Hugh Miller & Alan Ward at Camus Cross, Co. Tipperary, 11 July 1976.		2:07
5	John Mahinney’s No. 1 / Sligo Bay(Jigs)	Julia Clifford(fiddle), Billy Clifford(flute).	1:52
5	Recorded by Hugh Miller & Alan Ward at Camus Cross, Co. Tipperary, 11 July 1976.		1:52
6	Paddy in London(Jig)	Jack Heffernan(accordion), Mary Heffernan(bodhran).	1:36
6	Recorded by Peter Graves & Billy Steven at the Victoria Tavern, Holloway Road, London, early 1988.		1:36
7	Australian Waters(Jig)	Danny Meehan(fiddle).	1:47
7	Recorded by Reg Hall & Dermot Kearney at Reg Hall’s house, Croydon, London, 28 May 1987.		1:47
8	Farewell to Ireland / The Maid of Mount Cisco / Come West along the Road(Reels)	Marcus Hernon(flute), Martin McMahon(accordion), Teresa McMahon, (keyboard).	4:54
8	Recorded by Austin Barrett at a party in Marcus Hernon’s house, Carna, Co. Galway, 2006.		4:54
9	un-titled / Royal Charlie(Single Jigs)	Lucy Farr(fiddle).	2:04
9	Recorded by Bill Leader & Reg Hall at Leader Sounds studio, Greetland, Yorkshire, 9 August 1976.		2:04
10	Anderson’s(Reel)	Lucy Farr(fiddle).	1:52
10	Recorded by Bill Leader & Reg Hall at Leader Sounds studio, Greetland, Yorkshire, 9 August 1976.		1:52
11	The Long Note(Single Jig)	Lucy Farr(fiddle).	2:01
11	Recorded by Bill Leader & Reg Hall at Leader Sounds studio, Greetland, Yorkshire, 9 August 1976.		2:01
12	Jack Coughlin’s Favourite(Reel)	Gabe O’Sullivan(flute).	1:27
12	Recorded by Nic Kinsey & supervised by Peter Bellamy at Livingstone Studios, Barnet, London, April 1979.		1:27
13	The Green Blanket(Jig)	Gabe O’Sullivan(flute).	1:43
13	Recorded by Nic Kinsey & supervised by Peter Bellamy at Livingstone Studios, Barnet, London, April 1979.		1:43
14	The Green Mountain(Reel)	Brian Rooney(fiddle).	1:08
14	Provenance not known, London, probably 1980s.		1:08
15	Rolling in the Barrel(Reel)	Brian Rooney(fiddle).	0:39
15	Provenance not known, London, probably 1980s.		0:39
16	McHugh’s / The American Jig(Jigs)	Tom O’Connell(accordion), Mick O’Connor(banjo).	2:44
16	Recorded by Tony Engle & Reg Hall at Tom O’Connell’s house, Upper Holloway, London. 2 December 2014.		2:44
17	The Honeysuckle / The Frisco(Hornpipes)	Jacqueline McCarthy(concertina), Tommy Keane(uilleann pipes).	2:53
17	Recorded by Tommy Keane in The Crane Bar, Galway, 2010.		2:53
18	The Castlepollard Lass(Jig)	Tommy McGowan(fiddle).	1:32
18	Recorded by PJ Hernon, Co. Sligo, 1994.		1:32
19	Tommy McGowan’s(Jig)	Tommy McGowan(fiddle).	1:22
19	Recorded by PJ Hernon, Co. Sligo, 1994.		1:22
20	The Maid behind the Bar(Reel)	Eddie Corcoran(tin whistle), Seamus Tansey(tambourine).	1:53
20	Recorded by Bill Leader at Reg Hall’s house, Croydon, London, 11 October 1967.		1:53
21	Rakish Pat(Reel)	Henry Dwyer(fiddle).	1:18
21	Recorded by Reg Hall at Henry Dwyer’s house, Coolock, Drumfin, Riverstown, Co. Sligo, 3 December 1988.		1:18
22	Pat Burke’s / Fraher’s(Jigs)	Vince O’Halloran(accordion), Reg Hall(piano).	2:09
22	Recorded by Tony Engle & Tony Russell at the Tangent Studio, Shepherd’s Bush, London, 25 March 1976.		2:09
23	Touch Me If You Dare / The Flowers of Redhill(Reels)	Jack Dolan(three-quarter flute).	0:56
23	Recorded by Lucy Farr in The Favourite, Holloway, London, early 1970s.		0:56
24	Nora Crionna / The Banks of Newfoundland(Jigs)	Maureen Minogue(fiddle), Tom Cussen(banjo).	2:11
24	Recorded by Tom Cussen at Maureen Minogue’s house, London, 1969.		2:11
25	Scotch Mary / Ships Are Sailing(Reels)	Maureen Minogue(fiddle), Tom Cussen(banjo).	2:26
25	Recorded by Tom Cussen at Maureen Minogue’s house, London, 1969.		2:26
26	The Thatched Cabin / The Skylark(Reels)	Selina Munnelly(accordion).	1:36
26	Recorded by Andrew Bathe at Selina Munnelly’s flat, Finbury Park, London, 7 October 1984.		1:36
27	The Eel in the Sink / The Ivy Leaf(Reels)	Bill Glasheen(fiddle), Selina Munnelly(accordion), John Blout(banjo).	3:12
27	Recorded by Austin Barrett in The Blackstock, Finsbury Park, London, 1979.		3:12
28	The Humours of Lisheen(Jig)	Billy Clifford(flute).	1:01
28	Recorded by Reg Hall at Lucy & Eric Farr’s house, Ladywell, London, 16 August 1964.		1:01
29	The Humours of Glenflesk(Slide)	Julia Clifford(fiddle).	1:05
29	Recorded by Reg Hall at Lucy & Eric Farr’s house, Ladywell, London, 16 August 1964.		1:05
30	Sergeant Carey’s Dream(Reel)	Amby Whyms(fiddle).	1:22
30	Recorded by Tommy Maree at Amby Whyms’s house, London, 4 February 1998.		1:22
31	Paddy O’Brien’s(Reel)	Amby Whyms(fiddle).	1:26
31	Recorded by Tommy Maree at Amby Whyms’s house, London, 4 February 1998.		1:26
32	Maud Miller(Reel)	Amby Whyms(fiddle), Mary Bowe(concertina).	1:25
32	Recorded by Tommy Maree at Amby Whyms’s house, London, 4 February 1998.		1:25
33	Munster Buttermilk / Jim Ward’s / The Old Favourite(Jigs)	John Carty(banjo), Marcus Hernon(flute), unidentified(bodhran), Paddy Gallagher(bouzouki).	4:56
33	Recorded by Sean Dunn, Gunners Arms, Highbury, London, 1990. Larry Masterson Collection.		4:56
34	The Jolly Tinker / The Pretty Girls of Mayo(Reels)	Bobby Casey & Andy Boyle(fiddles), Paddy Breen(flute).	2:29
34	Recorded by Bill Leader & Reg Hall at Bill Leader’s flat, Camden Town, London, 19 April 1967.		2:29
35	The Banks of the Ilen / Cronin’s(Reels)	The Thatch Ceili Band.	2:33
35	Recording studio, London, 1986.		2:33

=== CD3 ===
The CD brings the scene up to date with recordings from 1988 to 2014.

The musicians in The Auld Triangle Ceili Band are Teresa Heanue & Sinead Linane(fiddles), James Carty, Mick Mulvey & John Murphy(flutes), Gary Connolly & Maureen Linane(accordions), Karen Ryan(banjo), Reg Hall(piano), Pat McNamee(drums).

Track	Title/Recording Details	Artist & Instrument/Original Release	Length
1	Lad O’Beirne’s / Fionn O’Donal’s(Reels)	Sinead Linane(fiddle), James Carty(flute), Reg Hall(keyboard).	3:07
1	Ceili House, RTÉ pre-recorded radio programme, The Auld Triangle, Finsbury Park, London, 17 April 2005. Courtesy of RTÉ Archives.		3:07
2	The Concert Reel / The Corpus Reel(Reels)	The Auld Triangle Ceili Band	2:28
2	Recorded by Seamus Brogan at the All-Britain Fleadh Ceoil, Edgehill College, Ormskirk, Cheshire, 29 June 2003.		2:28
3	Up Sligo / The Shoemaker’s Fancy(Jigs)	Lamond Gillespie(fiddle), John Blake(flute).	3:15
3	Recorded by Sean Keegan at the University of Limerick studio, 2007.		3:15
4	Lady Gordon / Johnny Henry’s(Reels)	Lamond Gillespie(fiddle), John Blake(flute), Eamon Burke(flute), Tommy Maree(accordion), Reg Hall(piano).	2:39
4	Recorded by Tommy Maree & John Blake at Our Lady of Grace RC School, Dollis Hill, London, 20 December 2008.		2:39
5	The Mullingar Races / Music in the Glen(Reels)	Sean Casey(fiddle), Bernadette McCarthy(fiddle), Dermot Kearney(banjo), Reg Hall(piano).	3:41
5	Recorded by Peter Graves & Billy Steven at the Victoria Tavern, Holloway Road, London, early 1988.		3:41
6	The Primrose Lass / Cregg’s Pipes / Tom Ward’s Downfall(Reels)	Brian Rooney(fiddle), Mick Mulvey(flute), Reg Hall(keyboard).	2:43
6	Recorded by Simon Wroe, City of London, 5 April 2003.		2:43
7	The Mill Pond / Statia Donnelly’s(Jigs)	Dermot Burke(fiddle), Mick Mulvey(flute).	2:41
7	Recorded by Radio na Gaeltachta, supervised by Neansaí Ní Choisdealbha, at the Irish Centre, Camden Town, London, 27 May 2011. Courtesy of Radio na Gaeltachta.		2:41
8	Grandpa Tommy’s Ceili Band(Reel)	Brian Rooney(fiddle).	0:53
8	Provenance not known, London, 1980s?		0:53
9	The Knocknagow(Jig)	Brian Rooney(fiddle).	0:59
9	Provenance not known, London, 1980s?		0:59
10	Devaney’s Goat / The Dairymaid(Reels)	Mick Linane & Sinead Linane(fiddles), James Carty(flute), Gary Connolly & Maureen Linane(accordions), Reg Hall(keyboard).	3:57
10	Recorded by Chris Kreinczes in the Auld Triangle, Finsbury Park, London, 19 September 2010.		3:57
11	The Salmanca / The Crooked Road(Reels)	Brendan Mulkere(fiddle), Paul Gallagher(flute).	2:05
11	Recorded by Robin Broadbank at a concert at University College, Cork, 26 February 1994.		2:05
12	Blackbirds and Thrushes(Slow Air)	Joe Whelan(accordion), Liam Farrell(banjo).	2:47
12	Recorded by Simon Ritchie & John Howson at Reg Hall’s house, Croydon, London, 22 October 2001.		2:47
13	Collier’s / The Doone(Reels)	Joe Whelan(accordion), Liam Farrell(banjo), Reg Hall(piano).	3:26
13	Recorded by Simon Ritchie & John Howson at Reg Hall’s house, Croydon, London, 22 October 2001.		3:26
14	The Telegraph / Out on the Ocean(Jigs)	Austin Dawes(fiddle), Seanin McDonagh(accordion), Bobby Ramsey(guitar).	2:00
14	Ceili House, RTÉ pre-recorded radio programme, the Lord Napier, Thornton Heath, London, 27 April 1999. Courtesy of RTÉ Archives.		2:00
15	The Morning Dew(Reel)	Austin Dawes(fiddle), Seanin McDonagh(accordion), Bobby Ramsey(guitar).	2:40
15	Recorded by John Blake & Tommy Maree at Our Lady of Grace RC School, Dollis Hill, London, 15 August 2008.		2:40
16	Pat Mahon’s / The Fox and the Thatch(Jigs)	Sheena Vallely(flute).	2:13
16	London, 20 June 2014.		2:13
17	Dan Breen’s / The Road to Monalea(Reels)	Sheena Vallely(flute).	1:47
17	London, 20 June 2014.		1:47
18	The Musical Priest / Jenny’s Chickens(Reels)	Sean Casey(fiddle), Reg Hall(piano).	2:26
18	Recorded by Peter Graves & Billy Steven at the Victoria Tavern, Holloway Road, London, early 1988.		2:26
19	Cronin’s / The Western(Hornpipes)	Tom O’Connell(accordion), Mick O’Connor(banjo).	3:03
19	Recorded by Tony Engle & Reg Hall at Tom O’Connell’s house, Upper Holloway, London. 2 December 2014.		3:03
20	Fred Finn’s(Reel)	Eamon Burke(flute), Reg Hall(piano).	1:56
20	Recorded by John Blake & Tommy Maree at Our Lady of Grace RC School, Dollis Hill, London, 20 December 2008.		1:56
21	Marie Rua (Red Haired Mary)(Slip Jig) / The Visit to Ireland(Jig)	Rosie O’Leary(fiddle), Clare O’Leary(fiddle), Alan O’Leary(flute).	2:55
21	The Traditional Music Hour, Resonance 104.4 FM radio programme pre-recorded by Paul Jackson, London, 23 November 2013.		2:55
22	The Boys of the Lough / The Devils of Dublin(Reels)	Lamond Gillespie & Jimmy Murphy(fiddles), John Blake, James Carty, Eamon Burke & John MacLeod(flutes), Mick Leahy(bouzouki), Reg Hall(piano).	3:41
22	The Traditional Music Hour, Resonance 104.4 fm live radio programme, London, 19 May 2011.		3:41
23	Farrell Gara / Christmas Eve / The Sligo Maid(Reels)	Karen Ryan(fiddle).	5:23
23	Recorded by Simon Wroe, City of London, early 2001.		5:23
24	The Coolai(Jig)	Mick Linane & Sinead Linane(fiddles), Gary Connolly & Maureen Linane(accordions), Reg Hall(keyboard).	2:05
24	Recorded by Chris Kreinczes in the Auld Triangle, Finsbury Park, London, 19 September 2010.		2:05
25	The Laurel Tree / King of the Clans(Reels)	John Blake(flute), Eamon Burke(flute), Tommy Maree(bodhran), Reg Hall(piano).	3:43
25	Recorded by John Blake & Tommy Maree at Our Lady of Grace RC School, Dollis Hill, London, 20 December 2008.		3:43
26	P Flanagan’s / The Corpus Reel(Reels)	Gary Connolly(accordion), James Carty(flute), Reg Hall(keyboard), Francis Gaffney(guitar).	3:32
26	Recorded by James Clenaghan, St. Anne’s church hall, Salusbury Road, Kilburn, London, 21 July 2007.		3:32
