= Eggs and Marrowbone =

Folk song

"Eggs and Marrowbone" (Laws Q2, Roud 183), also known as "There Was An Old Woman", is a traditional folk song of a wife's attempted murder of her husband. Of unknown origins, there are multiple variations.

The most well known variations are "The Old Woman From Boston" and "The Rich Old Lady". Other versions include "The Aul' Man and the Churnstaff", and "Woman from Yorkshire." In Scotland it is known as "The Wily Auld Carle" or "The Wife of Kelso." In Ireland there are variations called "The Old Woman of Wexford" and "Tigaree Torum Orum." In England the song is widely known as "Marrowbones".

A similar song, "Johnny Sands" (Roud 184), was written by John Sinclair about 1840 and also became popular with local singers. In this version the husband pretends to be tired of life, and asks his wife to tie his hands behind his back.

Herbert Hughes writes that the song is English in origin.

== Synopsis ==
The song concerns an old woman who, in one popular version, loves "her husband dearly, but another man twice as well." She decides to kill him, and is advised by a local doctor that feeding him eggs and marrowbone will make him blind. Thus

She fed him eggs and marrowbone
And made him sup them all
And it wasn't too long before
He couldn't see her at all

She then arranges to push him into the river. He steps aside and she falls in. Subsequently,

She cried for help, she screamed for help
And loudly she did bawl
The old man said "I'm so blind
I can't see you at all!"

Despite his blindness, the old man manages to keep her from climbing out of the river by pushing her back in with a pole.

She swam around and swam around
Until she came to the brim
The old man got the linen prop
And pushed her further in.

(A linen prop is a pole used to prevent washing on a line from blowing about too much).

The moral of the song is:

Now the old woman is dead and gone
And the Devil's got her soul
Wasn't she a gosh-darn fool
That she didn't grab that pole?

Eating eggs and marrowbone
Won't make your old man blind
So if you want to do him in
You must sneak up from behind

== Notable versions ==
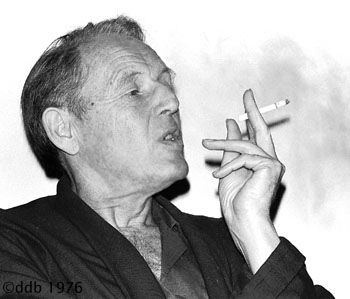
Richard Dyer-Bennet

- Richard Dyer-Bennet recorded multiple versions of the song and regularly performed it in concert.
- Steeleye Span recorded a version in September 1971 for their third album, Ten Man Mop, or Mr. Reservoir Butler Rides Again.
- The Clancy Brothers with Tommy Makem recorded "Old Woman from Wexford" on their 1962 album The Boys Won't Leave the Girls Alone

=== Field Recordings ===
Many of these are available to listen online.

- There are several recordings of Scots singers on the Tobar an Dualchais/Kist o'Riches website - a 1952 recording of Willie Mathieson singingThe Wily Old Carle, a 1954 recording of Stewart Lowden with the same title, 1955 and 1960 recordings of The Auld Wife o Kelso sung by James Taylor and George Inglis Fraser respectively, and a 1967 recording of The Old Woman of Kelso sung by Janet Gibson Lynch, all recorded by Hamish Henderson.
- A 1956 recording by Ulster singer Sarah Makem is on the Topic Voice of the People CD The Heart Is True under the title "The Canny Oul Lad".
- A version titled "Holy Boly" sung by Arkansans "The Gilbert Sisters" and recorded by Max Hunter in 1960 is in the Max hunter Collection at Missouri State University.
- A version by New York state singer Grant Rogers, recorded by Alan Lomax in 1966 is in the Alan Lomax Sound Recordings collection at the Association for Cultural Equity.
- A version by Arkansan singer Ollie Gilbert titled Old Woman in Ireland, recorded by Max Hunter in 1969, is in the Max hunter Collection at Missouri State University.
- A 1971 recording of Suffolk singer Jimmy Knights singing An Old Woman From Ireland is in the Keith Summers English Folk Music Collection in the British Library Sound Archive.
- A version sung by two Birmingham women, Doreen Clarkson and Christine Thomas, recorded in 1989 by Roy Palmer is in the British Library Sound Archive.
- A version performed by Dave Zeitlin (animation by Carol Roe, film by Stuart Roe, Directed by Ralph Hart), created in 1954.

== See also ==
- Roud Folk Song Index, #183.
