= Nance the Piper =

Irish piper

Nance the Piper (fl. later 1800s) was an Irish piper.

According to the left-handed piper, Jimmy Barry (piper), a rare example of a woman piper was Nance the Piper of Castlelyons, County Cork. Barry related that she

"become a performer from dire necessity, on the death of her husband. She was an especial favorite with the dancers, and it is quite likely that she must have had some previous training to have acquired such proficiency. None but the best can play for those who are called stage or platform dancers. Without a blink of light in her eyes, she was able to discern each step-dancer by the sound of his feet."

Barry furthermore stated that

"Not the least entertaining part of the performance was the fusillade of comments she kept up all the time, such as: Wisha, darlin, to ye, Patsy Magner. Yerra, I wouldn't doubt your father's son Wire into 'em, Mickey Joe Sullivan, there is not the batins of ye anywhere for a gorsoon. Faith, 'tis little boastin' the Mulcahey's of Grange will have whin ye are a year or two oldher. Now, Darby Tom, don't ye let it go with 'em. Ah, 'twas kind father for you to be handy with your fut, me bouchal."

Francis O'Neill was evidently much taken with the stories he heard of her, remarking that "A character so quaint and unique as this blind woman piper, if "Jimmy" Barry's story be true, should have been immortalized in Irish literature."

== See also ==
- Kitty Hanley
- Margaret Barry (1917–1989), Irish traditional singer and banjo player
- Eileen Donaghy (1930–2008), Irish traditional singer.
- Martin O'Reilly (1829-1904), Irish piper
