= Factory Girl (folk song) =

Traditional Irish song

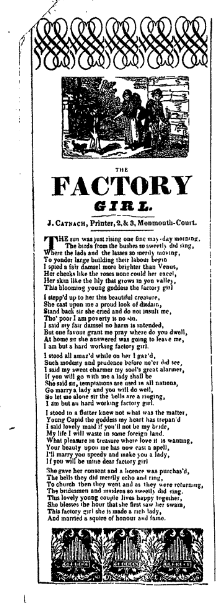

Song by The Roches, The Chieftains with Sinéad O'Connor, Margaret Barry, and Eric Burdon
- Language: English
- Genre: Folk rock, Celtic
- Songwriter(s): Traditional

Audio
- "Factory Girl" on YouTube

Factory Girl (Roud 1659) is a traditional song. It was collected by Roud in both England and Ireland, and has been performed by The Roches, The Chieftains with Sinéad O'Connor, Lisa O'Neill with Radie Peat, Margaret Barry, Rhiannon Giddens, and Eric Burdon. In 2015, Rhiannon Giddens released a version on an EP of the same name, rewritten in response to disasters such as the 2013 Dhaka garment factory collapse.

== Synopsis ==
Its lyrics tell the story of a young man who meets a poor girl on her way to her job at a factory. She initially resists the singer's advances due to her class pride and ability to support herself. Endings of the song vary; in some, the two characters end up marrying, but in others, the girl ultimately rejects the suitor. In Gidden's version, the lyrics are rewritten so that the song ends with the collapse of the factory and death of the titular girl, in reference to the unsafe working conditions in many factories, particularly garment factories.
