= The Bonny Bunch of Roses =

"The Bonny Bunch of Roses" (Roud 664, Laws J5) is a folk song written in the 1830s by an unknown balladeer from the British Isles.

The earliest known version of the tune is in William Christie's Tradition Ballad Airs, Volume 2 (1881). There is an obvious difficulty in identifying the narrator's voice. It is a conversation between Napoleon's son (Napoleon II, 1811–1832, named King of Rome by his father upon birth) and his mother (Marie Louise, Duchess of Parma, Napoleon's second wife, whom he married after divorcing Joséphine de Beauharnais). The sentiment is sympathetic to Napoleon but is also patriotic. Napoleon was defeated because he failed to beware of the 'bonny bunch of roses' - England, Scotland and Ireland, whose unity cannot be broken.

== Historical context ==
The song stresses the unity of the English, Scots and Irish, suggesting acknowledgement of a common British identity in opposition to France and Napoleon among the soldiers from those three nations at the time.

== Field recordings ==
The song was recorded from many traditional singers, mostly in the 1950s and 60s, and particularly in England, Ireland and Canada. Below is a brief selection:

- Harry Cox of Norfolk, England, whose recording can be heard online here
- Sam Larner of Norfolk, England
- Fred Jordan of Shropshire, England
- Phil Tanner of Llangenith, South Wales
- Robert Cinnamond of County Antrim, Northern Ireland

== Popular recordings ==
There are many recorded versions, including the Chieftains (with Dolores Keane as the singer), De Dannan, Fairport Convention, Glen Campbell, Ewan MacColl, Cyril Poacher, Séamus Ennis, Nic Jones, Séan Garvey, Maddy Prior and June Tabor in collaboration with the Oysterband, John Wesley Harding, and Norman & Nancy Blake in collaboration with the Boys of the Lough. Bob Dylan featured Paul Clayton's version on his Theme Time Radio Hour.

== Lyrics ==
The lyrics below are from 1881.

Near by the swelling ocean,
One morning in the month of June,
While feather'd warbling songsters
Their charming notes did sweetly tune,
I overheard a lady
Lamenting in sad grief and woe,
And talking with young Bonaparte
Concerning the bonny Bunch of Roses, O.

Thus spake the young Napoleon,
And grasp'd his mother by the hand:-
"Oh, mother dear have patience,
Till I am able to command;
I'll raise a numerous army,
And through tremendous dangers go,
And in spite of all the universe,
I'll gain the bonny Bunch of Roses, O."

Oh, son, speak not so venturesome;
For England is the heart of oak;
Of England, Scotland, and Ireland,
The unity can ne'er be broke.
And think you on your father,
In the Island where he now lies low,
He is not yet interred in France;
So beware of the bonny Bunch of Roses, O.

Your father raised great armies,
And likewise kings did join the throng;
He was so well provided.
Enough to sweep the world along.
But when he went to Moscow,
He was o'erpower'd by drifting snow;
And though Moscow was blazing
He lost the bonny Bunch of Roses, O.

"Oh, mother, adieu for ever,
I am now on my dying bed,
If I had liv'd I'd have been brave
But now I droop my youthful head.
And when our bones do moulder,
And weeping-willows o'er us grow,
Its deeds to bold Napoleon
Will stain the bonny Bunch of Roses, O."
