= Broom of the Cowdenknowes =

Traditional song

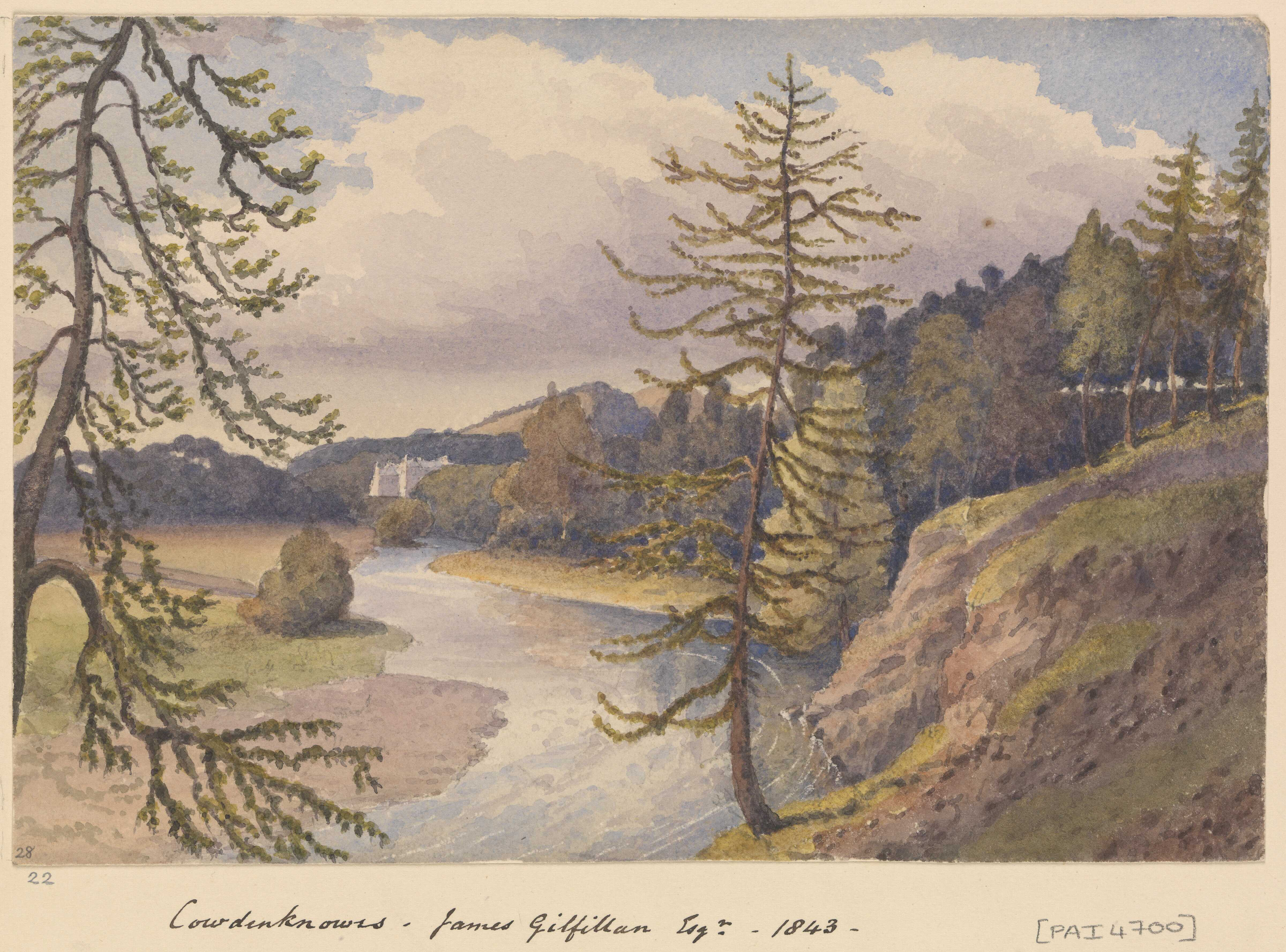
The Leader valley at Cowdenknowes House, Berwickshire, 1843

"Broom of the Cowdenknowes", also known as "Bonny May", is a traditional Scottish love ballad (Child 217, Roud 92). It has been traced to the seventeenth century, but its exact origin is unknown.

The title of the song references the Scotch Broom (Cytisus scoparius) flower, a vibrant yellow flower found throughout Scotland, including the hillside known as Cowdenknowes within the Scottish barony of that name east of the Leader Water (River Leader), 32 miles southeast of Edinburgh in Berwickshire.

== Synopsis ==
The original and extended ballad was the story of a young shepherdess who falls in love with a stranger on horseback, who rides by her pasture every day. The song became popular across Scotland and England towards the end of the reign of James Vl & I, and the earliest publication date found is 1651. The melody was also published as a dance tune, during the same year, in John Playford's first edition of The English Dancing Master.

Throughout the many versions of the popular folksong, there are many lyrical variations, but the plot remain consistent. The shepherdess and stranger fall in love and have an affair. When she becomes pregnant, she is banished from her country. She seeks out her lover, finding him to now be a wealthy lord. They marry, but she is never truly happy away from her own country, and she pines for "the bonnie bonnie broom".

Traditionally, the song is sung from the perspective of the shepherdess. The broom, a tall shrub which blooms with spikes of small golden flowers, once grew abundantly on hillsides of the Scottish Borders.

== Recordings ==
"Broom O' the Cowdenknowes" was recorded by Scottish folk singer Jean Redpath on her 1987 release A Fine Song for Singing. Other artists who recorded the song under either this title or its variants include Silly Wizard, Alexander James Adams, Baltimore Consort, John Allan Cameron, Cherish the Ladies, The City Waites, Liam Clancy, Meg Davis, Frankie Gavin, Ian Giles, Dave Gunning, The Highwaymen, Michal Hromek, Jimmy MacBeath, Ed Miller, North Sea Gas, Kim Robertson, Lucie Skeaping, The Watersons, and Robin Williamson.

The ballad was recorded under its alternate title "Bonny May" by English folk singer June Tabor on her first solo album, Airs and Graces, in 1976. It was also released under this title by the group 10,000 Maniacs on its 2015 album Twice Told Tales and by Offa Rex, a group featuring the American indie rock band Decemberists and British folk singer Olivia Chaney, on its 2017 debut The Queen of Hearts.
