= The Herring Song =

Song

The Herring Song, also known as Bolliton Sands, The Red Herring and Jolly Red Herring is a folk-song (Roud 128) found in various forms and believed to be associated with the once-thriving herring-fishing industry in the North Sea. Several different variants of the song are known. A version of "The Red Herring" which was collected at South Zeal is included in the Baring-Gould manuscripts.

The song extols the virtues of herrings, with each verse listing in turn the parts of a herring's body and suggesting an unfeasible use for it. For example, What shall we do with the herring’s head? We’ll make it into loaves of bread, or What shall we do with the herring’s tail? We’ll make it into barrels of ale.

Some versions take the format of a cumulative song, recounting all the previously mentioned body parts.
