= Jimmy MacBeath =

Scottish singer (1894–1972)

- Born: 1894; Portsoy, Scotland, United Kingdom
- Died: 1972 (aged 77–78); Aberdeen, Scotland, United Kingdom
- Known for: Folk singer

Jimmy MacBeath (1894–1972) was a Scottish Traveller and Traditional singer of the Bothy ballads from the north east of Scotland. He was both a mentor and source for fellow singers during the mid 20th century British folk revival. He had a huge repertoire of songs, which were recorded by Alan Lomax and Hamish Henderson.

== Life ==
Jimmy MacBeath (pronounced the same as Macbeth) was born to a family of Scottish Travellers in the fishing village of Portsoy, Banffshire, Scotland. He learned songs such as "Lord Randall" (Child Ballad 12) from his mother. At the age of 13 he started work as a live-in farm hand at Deskford. He was a bachelor all his life and learned many songs in the bothies, or farm huts where the male farm workers lived. He was to be a traveller for much of his life; in 1908 he took his first long walk, from Inverness to Perth. In the First World War he joined the Gordon Highlanders and fought in Flanders. Later he served in the Royal Army Medical Corps during the Irish War of Independence. In the 1920s he was demobbed. Working as a kitchen porter, begging and at seasonal fruit picking, he set about tramping the roads of Scotland, England, the Channel Islands, and Nova Scotia. In the streets, pubs, hiring fairs, and markets he earned money by singing. It is even said that he sang in cinemas, which had no piano to play during silent films. He tended to wander during the summer, and spend the winter in Elgin.

== Death ==
He died in Tor-na-Dee Hospital in Aberdeen and was buried in his native Portsoy.

== Singing career ==
Jimmy MacBeath was a "traditional singer". He was part of the last generation to sing traditional songs in bothies, along with John Strachan, and Willie Scott, In the 1920s he travelled the roads with Davie Stewart, who was also a singer, and who played the bagpipes and accordion. Their styles were very different, so one sang while the other collected. He lived in "model lodging houses", government-run houses for homeless men, slightly better than "flophouses". In 1951 Alan Lomax and Hamish Henderson were in Turriff, when they heard about Jimmy in Elgin. At the prospect of living at the expense of Columbia Records, he came to Turriff and stayed at one of the best hotel rooms. In 1952 he went to London to appear in the earliest folk series on British television. In 1965, along with many other traditional singers and musicians, he appeared at the first of the national folk festivals held at Keele University. For many years he was popular in folk clubs. When he sang "The Barnyards of Delgaty" at the 1951 Edinburgh People's Festival Ceilidh, the audience were rapturous.

Repertoire

A number of the songs he sang has been passed on to singers involved in the early times of the Folk Revival in England and Scotland e.g. "The Keach in the Creel" and "Tramps and Hawkers". Peter Kennedy's collection Folksongs of Britain and Ireland (1975) included 13 of Jimmy MacBeath's songs.

His songs and interviews have examples of beggar's cant, a secret language.

- Gadgie in this keer - manager in this place
- manashee - girl

These words are Romany, and ultimately Hindi. He also sang songs in Doric dialect, such as "Fa Would Be a Fisherman's Wife?". For lovers of the occult, track 11 on CD 2 of "Two Gentlemen of the Road", is of interest. He describes the initiation ceremony of "The Horseman's Word", a kind of Masonic organisation for horsemen wanting to control horses using secret words. They met between midnight and 1 a.m. and asked the initiate as series of questions, including "Was the road crooked or straight?" - "The Road was dark and crooked. I come by the light of the moon". He would be harnessed and dragged through chaff—broken fragments of dry sharp stalks of wheat. The initiate would have to shake hands with a young calf. This might be interpreted as greeting the devil. The initiate wore a tricorne hat, and heard obscure words recited from a book. Alan Lomax's response is "Sounds like witchcraft to me". MacBeath is very sceptical about the whole affair. There is no way of knowing whether this is a centuries-old ceremony, or a scam dreamed up in the 19th century to prevent outsiders from getting work as horsemen.

== Discography ==
- Wild Rover No More (1967), a 12-inch LP
- Bound To Be A Row (1976)
- Two Gentlemen of the Road (2002), anthology by Jimmy MacBeath and Davie Stewart
- There is a man upon the farm - The Voice of the People vol 20 (1998) (various artists)
