= Honest Labourer =

Traditional song

The Honest Labourer also known as The Jolly Thresher, Poor Man, Poor Man or The Nobleman and the Thresher is a traditional English Folk ballad (Roud #19), which tells the story of a meeting between a poor labourer and a wealthy noble.

== Synopsis ==
A rich man meets a poor labourer and asks him how he manages to feed his wife and his large family. The labourer explains that he and his wife work very hard, waste nothing and never fight. But, despite this, they still find time to play with their children and show them the love they need. The wealthy man is very impressed and gives the poor man a significant amount of land to make his life easier. Overjoyed, the labourer declares that he hopes that such generosity is rewarded heaven.

== Commentary ==
Some broadside versions of the ballad date from the 17th century.

Robert Burns came across this song, titled The Poor Thresher, and, with James Johnson, had it printed in Scots Musical Museum in 1792. The original manuscript with 16 verses written in Burn's own hand is in the British Museum together with a note to his editor describing it as 'very pretty, and never that I know of was printed before'. Other versions have subsequently been published in a number of collections (in particular, in Ballads and Songs of the Peasantry of England by R. Bell; in English County Songs by L. Broadwood (1893)), although the tunes vary considerably. The different versions of the song that have been collected from all over Britain, Ireland and North America.

== Recordings ==
The Copper Family recorded the song as The Honest Labourer, which is available on Come Write Me Down
