= Margaret Barry =

Irish singer (1917–1989)

- Born: Margaret Cleary; 1 January 1917; Cork, Ireland
- Died: 10 December 1989 (Aged 72) Lawrencetown, County Down, Northern Ireland
- Genres: Irish traditional music Popular Irish music
- Occupation: Singer
- Instrument: Banjo

Margaret Barry (1917–1989) was an Irish singer who had a major influence on traditional Irish musicians.

== Biography ==
She was born Margaret Cleary on 1 January 1917 in Cork City. Many sources say that she came from a Traveller, a tinker, or even a Gypsy family. However, her birth certificate shows that her family were living in 99 North Main Street in Cork City, and her father's occupation is given as musician. He is reported to have earned a living playing the violin or the banjo to accompany silent movies. Her maternal grandfather, Bob Thompson, was a renowned uilleann piper who took first place at the Feiseanna Ceoil in Dublin and Belfast in 1897 and 1898. He was married to a Spanish guitar player and singer which might have contributed Gypsy blood. Other family members are said to have been "accomplished Traveller musicians and … street balladeers".

She taught herself how to play the banjo. Her mother died when she was ten and her father married again to a woman not much older than herself. She started busking in Cork when she was 14 and left home two years later on a bicycle with her banjo. She travelled throughout Ireland earning her living by singing at fairs, sporting events, outside pubs and on the streets generally. She sang mainly popular Irish songs which she taught herself from records or even listening in shops, but also picked up a large number of traditional Irish songs. Young women would approach her with names of the songs they wanted her to sing on a piece of paper, and if she didn’t know them already, she would make sure she learnt them. During this time, she took her daughter’s married name, Barry. She eventually acquired a caravan. She is reported as having had a unique voice which left a great impression on anyone who heard her singing.

In the early 1950s, she moved to London, originally to appear on a TV series called The Songhunter, produced by a young David Attenborough. Attenborough described in recent years how Barry’s striking wild, toothless appearance and her out-of-tune banjo playing prompted a volley of angry complaints about Irish tinkers being allowed on the TV. Barry became a well-known name on the London folk scene in the 1950s where, with her distinctive singing style and idiosyncratic banjo accompaniment, She was frequently accompanied by the fiddler Michael Gorman. Her singing and banjo playing became a major influence on the younger generation of ballad singers in Ireland and the UK, including Luke Kelly. She performed in the Carnegie Hall and the Rockefeller Centre in New York.

One song for which Barry is particularly noted is "She Moved Through the Fair". Asked by an interviewer, Karl Dallas, whether she had learned it from her family or from other Travellers, she replied cheerfully, "Oh, no. I got it off a gramophone record by Count John McCormack". The accompanying book to the Topic Records 70-year anniversary boxed set, Three Score and Ten, lists Her Mantle So Green as one of the classic albums and "The Factory Girl" from Street Songs and Fiddle Tunes of Ireland with Michael Gorman is track 9 on the third CD in the set.

A play, She Moved Through the Fair: The legend of Margaret Barry, co-written by Mary McPartlan and Colin Irwin had its debut in 2017 at the Tron Theatre in Glasgow, as part of the Celtic Connections Festival. Poet/songwriter, Frank Callery wrote a song for the centenary of Barry's birth. Singer/songwriter, Tim O'Riordan, wrote a song in celebration of Barry, "The Heart of the Song (for Margaret Barry)" and recorded it on the album Taibhse in 2018.

At the RTÉ Radio 1 Folk Awards in 2019, Barry was inducted into the Hall of Fame by American singer Peggy Seeger.

== Discography ==
- Songs of an Irish Tinker Lady (Riverside RLP 12–602, 1956)
- Street Songs and Fiddle Tunes (Topic 10T6, 1957) – with Michael Gorman
- Ireland’s Queen Of The Tinkers Sings (Top Rank 25/020, 1960)
- The Blarney Stone (Prestige Irish, 1961) – with Michael Gorman
- Songs From the Hills of Donegal (Washington WV 731, 1962)
- Irish Music In London Pubs (Folkways FG 3575, 1965) – with Michael Gorman
- Her Mantle So Green (Topic 12T123, 1965) – with Michael Gorman
- Come Back Paddy Reilly (Emerald GEM 1003, 1968)
- Sing and Play (Folkways FW8729, 1975)
- Ireland's Own (Outlet SOLP 1029, 1976)
- I Sang Through The Fairs (Rounder 11661-1774-2, 1998)
- Travellin' People from Ireland (Emerald EMCD8004, 2001) – with Pecker Dunne
- Queen of the Gypsies (Emerald EMCD8004, 2007)
- The Definitive Collection (Songs of The Travelling People) (PMI, 2013)

== See also ==
- Nance the Piper
