= Michael Gorman (musician) =

Fiddler

Michael Gorman (1895–1970) was an Irish fiddler (from County Sligo), often partnering Margaret Barry. He has been described as "one of traditional music's few superstars of the post-War decades" and one whose "musical roots in Ireland can be identified back to the artisan musicians in the immediate aftermath of the famine, and he was an active musician from about 1906 until 1970."

The accompanying book to the Topic Records 70-year anniversary boxed set Three Score and Ten lists Her Mantle So Green as one of the classic albums and The Factory Girl from Street Songs and Fiddle Tunes of Ireland with Margaret Barry is track 9 on the third CD in the set.

== Discography ==
- Bonnie Kate TFSA 60 077 (cassette)
- 1958 Street Songs and Fiddle Tunes of Ireland (with Margaret Barry) Topic 10T6
- 1965 Her Mantle So Green (with Margaret Barry) Topic 12T123
- Irish Songs and Tunes (with Margaret Barry) Folkways 8729
- 1967 The Blarney Stone (with Margaret Barry) Transatlantic XTRA 5037
- Irish Jigs, Reels and Hornpipes. Folkways 6819 (pipes, tin whistle & fiddle)
- 2001 The Sligo Champion:The Fiddle Music of County Sligo. Topic Records TSCD 525D
