= Fred Jordan (singer) =

- Born: Frederick Jordan; 5 January 1922; Ludlow, Shropshire, England
- Died: 30 July 2002 (aged 80) Ditton Priors
- Genres: Traditional folk music
- Occupations: Agricultural labourer, folk singer
- Years active: 1930s to 2000s
- Labels: Topic Records, Rounder Records, Veteran Records

Fred Jordan (5 January 1922 – 30 July 2002) was a farm worker from Ludlow, Shropshire, and is noted as one of the great musically untutored traditional English singers. He was first recorded in the 1940s by folk music researcher Alan Lomax and, over subsequent decades endeared himself to the English folk-song revival movement. Jordan was awarded the English Folk Dance and Song Society's highest honour, the Gold Badge, "for distinguished and unique contributions to the folk performing arts" in 1995.

== Early life ==
Jordan was born in Ludlow, the youngest of 5 children. His date of birth has been given in various sources as 16 October 1922 but this is an error arising from Peter Kennedy's inaccurate date of birth published in an old EFDSS magazine and repeated also on Fred's first LP sleeve. At the age of 6 he won a £1 prize for his singing of "The Gypsy's Warning". At the age of 14 he left school to work as a farm labourer for three shillings (£0.15) per week.

== Songs ==
He learnt his songs from his parents, fellow farm workers and travelling families. His repertoire included songs which had been handed-down by the oral tradition from as far back as the era of Samuel Pepys and from the music halls of the late 19th and early 20th centuries. He knew many versions of the famous Child Ballads, including The Outlandish Knight, Barbara Allen, Four Marys, Henry My Son, The Three Crows, The Watery Grave. He mainly sang his songs in pubs.

== First recordings ==
Following the Second World War, Jordan was working for a blacksmith who heard that Alan Lomax was in the area, searching for songs in the way that Cecil Sharp had some 50 years earlier, and suggested that Lomax should listen to Jordan. Lomax made the first recording of his singing. In 1952 Peter Kennedy, working for the BBC on secondment from the English Folk Dance and Song Society (EFDSS) made further recordings of Jordan on a farm at Diddlebury.

== Recognition and critical acclaim ==
Following these recordings Jordan became nationally recognised in folk music circles and left Shropshire for the first time in his life to sing on BBC programmes and in live performances at venues as significant as London's Royal Festival Hall and Manchester Free Trade Hall. He also toured Scotland at this time, meeting Hamish Henderson in Edinburgh. These performances led to him becoming a popular guest artist at folk clubs through the next two decades. He continued to work as a casual farm labourer, combining fencing, hedging, ditching and harvesting with his new career as a singer. With the growth of folk festivals he appeared before ever-larger audiences at festivals such as Keele, Cambridge, Bromyard and Sidmouth. His signature song became "The Farmer's Boy" which usually brought his concerts to an end. Jordan's voice was described by Peta Webb as having a "beautiful timbre and vibrato" and that he could "bring out the essence of a song through a wide range of subtle devices". Derek Schofield described him as having a "subtle and skilful use of melodic ornament".

== Home life ==
Fred remained unchanged by his success and fame, continuing to live a simple life without radio, television or running water at his primitive cottage in Aston Munslow, near Craven Arms. He grew his own vegetables and was fond of his collection of horse brasses. He had his hair cut "once a month if it needed it or not" by a neighbour Mrs Hay. Jordan left his cottage in 2001 to live in a residential home in Ditton Priors due to poor health, where he died at the age of 80 on Tuesday 30 July 2002 following a heart attack.

== His legacy ==
Jordan's local festival was at Bromyard where he established a tradition of singing the final song of the event, usually "A Farmer's Boy". Following his death, the organisers of that festival established the "Fred Jordan Memorial Competition", to honour Jordan's name and to encourage traditional singers up to 25 years old. Winners so far have included:

- 2002 Kathryn Turner and Jim Moray
- 2003 Fiona Bradshaw
- 2004 Fiona Dunne
- 2005 Tina Taylor
- 2006 Elizabeth Hearn
- 2007 Maz O'Connor
- 2008 Ffion Mair Thomas and Kate Holland
- 2009 Niamh Boadle
- 2010 Kirsty Bromley
- 2011 Lydia Noble
- 2012 Rosie Hood
- 2013 Jo Moore and Cuthbert Noble
- 2014 Cohen Braithwaite-Kilcoyne
- 2015 Georgia Lewis
- 2016 Rowan Piggott
- 2017 Molly Pipe
- 2018 Sam Baxter
- 2019 Jon Doran

=== Selected discography ===
- Songs of a Shropshire Farm Worker – Topic Records LP, 12T150 (1966)
- When the Frost is on the Pumpkin – Topic Records LP, TS 233 (1974)
- In Course of Time – VWML cassette, 006 (1990)
- A Shropshire Lad – Veteran Records double CD, VTD148CD

=== Fred Jordan on compilation albums ===
The following CD albums each contain one or more tracks sung by Jordan:

- Hidden English – Topic Records CD, TSCD600
- My Ship Shall Sail The Ocean – Topic Records CD, TSCD652
- O'er His Grave The Grass Grew Green – Topic Records CD, TSCD653
- First I'm Going To Sing You A Ditty – Topic Records CD, TSCD657
- They Ordered Their Pints Of Beer And Bottles Of Sherry – Topic Records CD, TSCD663
- There Is A Man Upon The Farm – Topic Records CD, TSCD670
- Come All My Lads That Follow the Plough – Topic Records CD, TSCD655
- A Century Of Song – EFDSS CD, EFDSSCD02
- The Birds Upon The Tree – Musical Traditions Double CD, MTCD333
- Classic Ballads of Britain & Ireland Vol. 1 – Rounder Records CD, RCD1775
- Old Boys (at Whitby Folk Week) – Whitby Folk Week CD, WFW 26CD.

In 2009 Topic Records included in their 70-year anniversary boxed set Three Score and Ten "We Shepherds Are The Best of Men" from Songs of A Shropshire Worker as track twelve on the second CD.
