= Classic Anne Briggs =

Compilation album by Anne Briggs
- Released: 1990
- Recorded: 1963–1971
- Genre: Folk
- Label: Topic Records

Professional ratings
Review scores
Source	Rating
Allmusic	5/5 stars

Classic Anne Briggs is a compilation album by Anne Briggs, released by Topic Records in 1990.

The recordings are drawn from The Iron Muse (1963), The Hazards of Love (1964), The Bird in the Bush (Traditional Erotic Songs) (1966) and Anne Briggs (1971).

== Track listing ==
1. "The Recruited Collier" (The Iron Muse) (1963)
2. "The Doffing Mistress" (The Iron Muse) (1963)
3. "Lowlands Away" (The Hazards of Love) (1964)
4. "My Bonny Boy" (The Hazards of Love) (1964)
5. "Polly Vaughan" (The Hazards of Love) (1964)
6. "Rosemary Lane" (The Hazards of Love) (1964)
7. "Gathering Rushes" (The Bird in the Bush) (1966)
8. "The Whirly Whorl" (The Bird in the Bush) (1966)
9. "The Stonecutter Boy" (The Bird in the Bush) (1966)
10. "Martinmas Time" (The Bird in the Bush) (1966)
11. "Blackwater Side" (Anne Briggs) (1971)
12. "The Snow It Melts the Soonest" (Anne Briggs) (1971)
13. "Willie o Winsbury" (Anne Briggs) (1971)
14. "Go Your Way" (Anne Briggs) (1971)
15. "Thorneymoor Woods" (Anne Briggs) (1971)
16. "The Cuckoo" (Anne Briggs) (1971)
17. "Reynardine" (Anne Briggs) (1971)
18. "Young Tambing" (Anne Briggs) (1971)
19. "Living by the Water" (Anne Briggs) (1971)
20. "Maa Bonny Lad" (Anne Briggs) (1971)

== Personnel ==
- Anne Briggs – Vocals, Guitar, Bouzouki
- Johnny Moynihan – Bouzouki
