= A Collection (Anne Briggs album) =

Compilation album by Anne Briggs
- Released: 1999
- Recorded: 1963–1971
- Genre: Folk
- Length: 76:35
- Label: Topic
- Producer: Tony Engle

Professional ratings
Review scores
Source	Rating
Allmusic	5/5 stars

A Collection is a compilation album by Anne Briggs, released by Topic Records in 1999.

The recordings are drawn from The Iron Muse (1963), Edinburgh Folk Festival (1963), Edinburgh Folk Festival Vol. 2 (1964), The Hazards of Love (1964), The Bird in the Bush (Traditional Erotic Songs) (1966) and Anne Briggs (1971)

== Track listing ==
Source: Amazon

No.	Title	Original album and date	Length
1.	"The Recruited Collier"	The Iron Muse – 1963	2:42
2.	"The Doffing Mistress"	The Iron Muse – 1963	1:26
3.	"She Moves Through the Fair"	Edinburgh Folk Festival – 1963	2:19
4.	"Let No Man Steal Your Thyme"	Edinburgh Folk Festival Vol. 2 – 1964	1:49
5.	"Lowlands"	The Hazards of Love – 1964	3:15
6.	"My Bonny Boy"	The Hazards of Love – 1964	2:52
7.	"Polly Vaughan"	The Hazards of Love – 1964	4:25
8.	"Rosemary Lane"	The Hazards of Love – 1964	2:43
9.	"Gathering Rushes in the Month of May"	The Bird In The Bush – 1966	4:51
10.	"The Whirly Whorl"	The Bird In The Bush – 1966	1:17
11.	"The Stonecutter Boy"	The Bird In The Bush – 1966	1:57
12.	"Martinmas Time"	The Bird In The Bush – 1966	4:56
13.	"Blackwater Side"	Anne Briggs – 1971	3:54
14.	"The Snow it Melts The Soonest"	Anne Briggs – 1971	2:23
15.	"Willie o Winsbury"	Anne Briggs – 1971	5:33
16.	"Go Your Way"	Anne Briggs – 1971	4:13
17.	"Thorneymoor Woods"	Anne Briggs – 1971	3:36
18.	"The Cuckoo"	Anne Briggs – 1971	3:11
19.	"Reynardine"	Anne Briggs – 1971	2:59
20.	"Young Tambing"	Anne Briggs – 1971	10:44
21.	"Living By The Water"	Anne Briggs – 1971	3:55
22.	"Maa Bonny Lad"	Anne Briggs – 1971	1:18

== Personnel ==
- Anne Briggs – Vocals, Guitar, Bouzouki
- Johnny Moynihan – Bouzouki
