= The Hazards of Love (EP) =

EP by Anne Briggs
- Released: 1963
- Studio: Olympic Sound Studios, London
- Genre: Folk
- Label: Topic
- Producer: A. L. Lloyd

Anne Briggs chronology
The Hazards of Love (1963)	Anne Briggs (1971)

The Hazards of Love is an EP by Anne Briggs, released by Topic Records in 1963.

== Track listing ==
All songs are traditional.

1. "Lowlands" (Roud 681)
2. "My Bonny Boy" (Roud 293)
3. "Polly Vaughan" (Roud 166; Laws O36)
4. "Rosemary Lane" (Roud 269; Laws K43)

== Release history ==
Topic re-issued the EP as a limited edition vinyl facsimile to celebrate Record Store Day in 2014.

Region	Date	Label	Format	Catalog
United Kingdom	1963	Topic records	mono EP	STOP94
United Kingdom	April 19, 2014	Topic records	EP	STOP2014
