= Sing a Song for You =

Studio album by Anne Briggs
- Released: 1997
- Recorded: March 1973
- Studio: RG Jones, London, UK
- Genre: Folk
- Length: 39:39
- Label: Fledg'ling Records
- Producer: Terry Brown for Jo Lustig

Anne Briggs chronology
| The Time Has Come (1971) | Sing a Song for You (1997) |

Professional ratings
Review scores
| Source | Rating |
|---|---|
| Allmusic | 4.5/5 stars |

Sing a Song for You is a folk album released in 1997 by Anne Briggs. It was originally recorded in March 1973 but was initially withheld from release as Anne Briggs reportedly wasn't satisfied with her singing on the album.

The album is the only instance of Anne Briggs recording together with a band. The band was Ragged Robin, a short-lived electric folk outfit founded by folk musician and singer-songwriter Steve Ashley. In October 1996 Briggs commented: "It was a lot of fun playing with Ragged Robin — the only time in my life I've ever worked with a group — they were tolerant of my inability to know what key I was playing or singing in, or even what chords I was playing [if any]!"

== Track listing ==
All tracks composed by Anne Briggs; except where noted.

1. "Hill's of Greenmor" (Traditional; arranged by Anne Briggs) - 3:15
2. "Sing a Song for You" - 4:24
3. "Sovay" (Traditional; adapted by A. L. Lloyd) - 3:14
4. "I Thought I Saw You Again" - 3:39
5. "Summer's In" - 5:15
6. "Travelling Easy" - 4:37
7. "The Bonambuie" (Traditional; arranged by Anne Briggs) - 4:28
8. "Tongue and Cheek" - 3:58
9. "Bird in the Bush" (Traditional; adapted by A. L. Lloyd) - 3:16
10. "Sullivan's John" (Traditional; arranged by Anne Briggs) - 4:10

== Personnel ==
- Anne Briggs – vocals, guitar, Irish bouzouki
- Barry Dransfield – violin (5, 10)
- Ragged Robin – accompaniment (2, 4–6, 10)
  - Steve Ashley – vocals, harmonica, whistle
  - Richard Byers – vocals, guitar, mandolin
  - Brian Diprose – bass guitar
  - John Thompson – drums, percussion
