= Three Score and Ten =

Three Score & Ten: A Voice to the People

Box set by Various Artists
- Released: 14 September 2009
- Recorded: 1939–2009
- Label: Topic
- Producer: David Suff

Three Score and Ten: A Voice to the People is a multi-CD box set album issued by Topic Records in 2009 to celebrate 70 years as an independent British record label.

The album consists of a hardback book containing the seven CDs and a paper insert detailing the Topic release list, complemented by a card insert to balance the release list.

The boxed set provides examples of recordings from the beginning of the label in 1939. Topic Records headlines their web site as Traditional and Contemporary Folk from the British Isles but in its history many other genres have appeared on the label. The album provides many examples including tracks from British Music Hall, blues, roots and World Music amongst others.

The album was curated, researched and produced by David Suff of Fledg'ling Records.

== Promotion ==
David Suff gave an interview to Simon Holland for Properganda on 27 July which included details of the research and length of time involved in compiling the boxed set. Simon then interviewed Tony Engle on 7 August about the album and the work of Topic records. This interview included a track from each of the CDs in the boxed set.

Mike Harding interviewed Tony Engle about the album and anniversary on 2 September 2009 on his BBC Radio 2 folk music show.

Topic Records co-hosted three concerts at London's South Bank to celebrate the 70 year anniversary and promote the boxed set. These were held on Friday 11 September 2009 at the Royal Festival Hall featuring The Waterson Family and the Eliza Carthy Band, Thursday 17 September 2009 at the Queen Elizabeth Hall featuring the Martin Simpson Big Band and Friday 18 September 2009 at the Queen Elizabeth Hall featuring June Tabor.

There were 2 additional concerts as part of this celebration. Saturday 19 September 2009 at the Purcell Rooms featuring Folklahoma and the Magpies Nest. Friday 25 September 2009 at the Kalamazoo Klub at the Union Chapel, London featuring Martin Carthy and Dave Swarbrick.

== Critical reception ==
Professional ratings
Review scores
Source	Rating
Songlines	5/5 stars
The Guardian	5/5 stars
The Telegraph	5/5 stars
Observer Music Monthly	5/5 stars
Allmusic	4.5/5 stars

The box set was received with much very positive comment by the general and specialist press

=== Commendations ===
Songlines review by Tim Cumming said "its one of the finest boxed sets I have ever seen".

Robin Denselow in the Guardian said "the oldest truly independent record label in the world, and the most important company in the story of British folk music, celebrates its 70th birthday this summer, and this fascinating, thoughtfully produced seven-CD set and 108-page hardback book marks the anniversary in style".

Doug Spencer on Australian ABC Radio National's Weekend Planet said "This is one of the more remarkable boxed compilations, ever. It has many English gems, but not only English ones".

Redlick said "This is obviously a huge labour of love and a wonderful tribute to a record label respected the world over".

Charles de Lint in the Green Man review said "This is timeless music that will undoubtedly sound just as good and relevant in another seventy years".

=== Awards ===
The album won fRoots Reissues and Compilations of the Year and Best Packaged Album of the Year in 2009.

== Packaging ==
The package consists of a 108-page hard-backed book with 4 CDs in the front cover and 3 CDs in the back cover together with a booklet cataloguing all the recordings issued by Topic up to the publication in 2009 and a card insert to balance the recordings list.

The dust jacket shows a photograph of Louis Killen and Frankie Armstrong and the book cover shows Reg Hall and Scan Tester.

The book details the history of Topic records with a number of spotlight studies of key albums, and brief biographies relating to Topic of artists and other personnel involved in the record label from the start up to the date of issue of the album.

=== Hardback book ===
==== Introduction ====
The hardback book provides a history of Topic Records from its start as a subscription label run by the Workers Music Association issuing 78 rpm shellac records, through the introduction of vinyl and its associated formats to CDs and subsequent to the boxed set the release of some of the older albums as downloads. The book contains pictures of album covers and artists that recorded them for Topic with a chronological history of the label up to 2009.

As part of this history there are spotlight studies of classic records and short biographies of key personnel and performers.

==== Spotlight Studies of Classic Records ====
Title	Artist(s)	Reference	Year
Her Mantle So Green	Margaret Barry and Michael Gorman	12T123	1965
The Iron Muse (A Panorama of Industrial Folk Song)	Various Artists	12T86	1963
Frost and Fire: A Calendar of Ceremonial Folk Songs	The Watersons	12T163	1965
Paddy in the Smoke Irish Music from a London Pub	Various Artists	12T176	1968
For Pence and Spicy Ale	The Watersons	12T265	1975
Penguin Eggs	Nic Jones	12TS411	1980
Handful of Earth	Dick Gaughan	12TS419	1981
Aqaba	June Tabor	12TS449	1988
Waterson:Carthy	Waterson–Carthy (Martin Carthy, Norma Waterson and Eliza Carthy)	TSCD475	1994
Unity	John Tams	TSCD508	2000
The Voice of the People	Various Artists	TSCD651 – 670	1998
Anglicana	Eliza Carthy	TSCD539	2002
Prodigal Son	Martin Simpson	TSCD567	2007

==== Biographies ====
Name	Reason for Inclusion
Alan Bush	Helped found the WMA in 1936 and was elected the first president of the association in 1941
A L Lloyd	Was appointed artistic director of Topic records which was officially only for one year but was a powerful influence over many years with Ewan MacColl.
Ewan MacColl	With Bert Lloyd was a driving force behind the folk revival after the second world war.
Bill Leader	Recording engineer and producer who recorded a lot for Topic records and other companies before setting up his own record company with 2 labels, Leader and Trailer.
Dick Swettenham	Electronics engineer who worked with Bill Leader and developed the first transistorised control desk in the world
Gerry Sharp	Accountant and business manager who kept the business on a financial even keel in its early days
Reg Hall	Musician associated with Topic records since 1963 as an accompanist, compiler and annotator of many recordings.
Tony Engle	Joined Topic in 1963 and took over the label in 1973 following Gerry Sharp’s death

=== Catalogue of releases ===
The catalogue details all the releases from the first record through to 2009. Each record is assigned a number starting from 1 with a prefix that denotes the format of issue.

Prefix	Format	First Issue	Last Issue	Comments
TRC (Topic Record Club	78 rpm record	1939	1958	
TRL	12 Inch Long Playing Record	1956	1956	
12T	12 Inch Long Playing Record	1958	1990	an S after the T signifies a stereo recording
10T	10 Inch Long Playing Record	1957	1960	
T	10 Inch Long Playing Record	1956	1956	
8T	8 Inch Long Playing Record	1957	1957	
7T	7 Inch microgroove LP (playing at 33 1/3rpm)	1957	1958	Only 3 records issued
TOP	7 Inch microgroove EP	1958	1958	S prefix indicates a stereo record. This prefix was used in 2014 for a special issue. Some of the titles appear to be single records.
TPS	Sampler	1964	1973	Length and size not specified
12TFRS	Free Reed label recordings	1975	1977	
SPD	Special Delivery	1987	1995	
TSCD	Compact disk	1990	present day	If the album was originally issued as a record then the number is re-used

The catalogue details The Voice of the People series separately.

Ewan MacColl’s Radio Ballads which were originally issued by Argos are listed as they are available though Topic.

A separate section details the Topic World Series CDs. A section details the only recording issued under the WMA heading.

Three further sections detail the Impact and String labels.

== Track listing ==
The seven CDs are themed covering different aspects of the Topic catalogue with a title appropriate to the content. The composer of the track will be displayed under the track name with Traditional when appropriate. A reference to external numbering systems for songs will be used where identified for traditional songs. The references are from the three major numbering schemes for folk songs, the Roud Folk Song Index, Child Ballad Numbers originating from Francis James Child and the Laws Numbers from the George Malcolm Laws numbering system. The original recordings are detailed in the listings. Many of these were not available at the time of issue but are now available as downloads from the usual sources with the original sleeve notes being made available by Topic from their web site.

=== Disk one – . . . a selection of treasures from the Topic catalogue ===
The disk contains a range of the music from various parts of the English speaking world that Topic Records has issued over its 70-year history. These include English folk songs, instrumentals including dance music, American blues, music hall and a recent composition that is regularly played by Irish folk groups. Track 2 is an instrumental issued as part of a joint album with Alexis Korner. This track and track 4 are now available as digital downloads of either the track or the full recording. Track 3 is a dance tune played on the Jew's Harp. Track 10 is from an album in the series "The Voice of the People" and is from a traditional English singer as is track 13. Track 12 was originally issued by Fontana in 1969 and is licensed to Topic by Polygram through Gama Records. The tracks are mainly from recordings issued in a variety for formats by Topic with track 15 from a Special Delivery album.

Track	Title/Composer	Artist(s)	Original Album/Reference	Year of Issue	Length(Mins)
1.	The Humpback Whale	Nic Jones	Penguin Eggs	1980	5:49
1.	Robertson	Nic Jones	12TS411	1980	5:49
2.	Angi	Davy Graham	3/4 AD	1963	2:25
2.	Davy Graham	Davy Graham	TOP70	1963	2:25
3.	The Shaskeen Reel	John Wright	The Lark In The Clear Air	1974	3:03
3.	Traditional	John Wright	12TS230	1974	3:03
4.	The Lancashire Toreadors	The Oldham Tinkers	Best O’ T’ Bunch	1974	3:12
4.	George Formby	The Oldham Tinkers	12TS237	1974	3:12
5.	Sullivan’s March	Pat Mitchell	Pat Mitchell - Uilleann pipes	1976	1:40
5.	Traditional	Pat Mitchell	12T294	1976	1:40
6.	San Francisco Bay Blues	Jesse Fuller	Working on the Railroad	1959	3:32
6.	Jesse Fuller	Jesse Fuller	10T59	1959	3:32
7.	Country Gardens	William Kimber	The Art Of William Kimber	1974	2:09
7.	Traditional	William Kimber	12T249	1974	2:09
8.	Tamlyn	Mike Waterson	Mike Waterson	1977	10:58
8.	Traditional(Roud 29; Child 39)	Mike Waterson	12TS332	1977	10:58
9.	The Air for Maurice Ogg / Jumping Jack / The Air for Maurice Ogg	Alistair Anderson	Steel Skies	1982	5:19
9.	Alistair Anderson/Traditional	Alistair Anderson	12TS427	1982	5:19
10.	Creeping Jane	Joseph Taylor	The Voice of the People – 8: A Story I'm Just About To Tell	1998	3:01
10.	Traditional(Roud 1012; Laws Q23)	Joseph Taylor	TSCD658	1998	3:01
11.	Wasps In The Woodpile	Andrew Cronshaw	Till The Beasts’ Returning	1988	3:42
11.	Traditional	Andrew Cronshaw	12TS447	1988	3:42
12.	Prince Heathen	Martin Carthy with Dave Swarbrick	Prince Heathen	1977	6:54
12.	Traditional(Roud 3336; Child 104; Laws C104)	Martin Carthy with Dave Swarbrick	12TS344	1977	6:54
13.	The Bonny Labouring Boy	Harry Cox	The Bonny Labouring Boy	2000	3:26
13.	Traditional(Roud 1162; Laws M14)	Harry Cox	TSCD512D	2000	3:26
14.	Rawtenstall Annual Fair	Lea Nicholson	Deep Lancashire	1968	3:03
14.	Weston & Lee	Lea Nicholson	12T188	1968	3:03
15.	Music For A Found Harmonium	Patrick Street	Irish Times	1990	2:40
15.	Simon Jeffes	Patrick Street	SPDCD1033	1990	2:40
16.	Bitter Withy	John Tams	The Reckoning	2005	6:42
16.	Traditional(Roud 452)	John Tams	TSCD551	2005	6:42

=== Disc two - England Arise! ===
The second disk contains English folk music and includes a number of traditional singers providing a link to the time when this music was the popular music of the country. The disk has the first of two tracks from "The Sweet Primeroses". Track 1 features an excerpt from the music used for an English folk custom dance performed each Easter in Bacup. All the recordings were originally issued on Topic albums either vinyl or as a CD.

Track	Title/Composer	Artist(s)	Original Album	Year of Issue	Length(Mins)
1.	The Nut Dance (excerpt)	The Britannia Coconut Dancers	The Voice of the People – 16: You Lazy lot of Bone-Shakers	1998	2:18
1.	Traditional	The Britannia Coconut Dancers	TSCD666	1998	2:18
2.	Spencer The Rover	Bob & Ron Copper	Come Write Me Down – Early Recordings of The Copper Family of Rottingdean	2001	3:21
2.	Traditional(Roud 1115)	Bob & Ron Copper	TSCD534	2001	3:21
3.	All Things Are Quite Silent	Shirley Collins	The Sweet Primeroses	1967	2:34
3.	Traditional(Roud 586)	Shirley Collins	12T170	1967	2:34
4.	Blackwater Side	Anne Briggs	Anne Briggs, currently available on A Collection	1971	3:48
4.	Traditional(Roud 312; Laws O1)	Anne Briggs	12T207	1971	3:48
5.	The Two Magicians	A L Lloyd	The Bird in the Bush (Traditional Erotic Songs)	1966	4:44
5.	Traditional(Roud 1350; Child 44)	A L Lloyd	12T135	1966	4:44
6.	Scan’s Polkas	Oak	Welcome To Our Fair	1971	2:13
6.	Traditional	Oak	12TS212	1971	2:13
7.	The Crafty Maid’s Policy	Frankie Armstrong	Lovely On The Water	1972	2:13
7.	Traditional(Roud 1624)	Frankie Armstrong	12TS216	1972	2:13
8.	A Place Called England	June Tabor	A Quiet Eye	1999	4:40
8.	Maggie Holland	June Tabor	TSCD510	1999	4:40
9.	When I Die	Peter Bellamy	Both Sides Then	1979	2:44
9.	Traditional(Roud 7697)	Peter Bellamy	12TS400	1979	2:44
10.	The Bold Princess Royal	Sam Larner	A Garland For Sam	1974	3:41
10.	Traditional(Roud 528; Laws K29)	Sam Larner	12T244	1974	3:41
11.	Hal-An-Tow	The Watersons	Frost and Fire: A calendar of Ritual and Magical Songs	1965	2:05
11.	Traditional(Roud 1520)	The Watersons	12T136	1965	2:05
12.	We Shepherds Are The Best of Men	Fred Jordan	Songs Of A Shropshire Worker	1967	3:41
12.	Traditional(Roud 284)	Fred Jordan	12T150	1967	3:41
13.	The Rose Of Britain’s Isle / Glorishears	John Kirkpatrick & Sue Harris	The Rose Of Britain’s Isle	1974	4:39
13.	Traditional(Roud 1796; Laws N16)	John Kirkpatrick & Sue Harris	12TS247	1974	4:39
14.	Riding Down To Portsmouth	Tom Willett	The Roving Journeyman – The Willett Family	1962	3:40
14.	Traditional(Roud 1534)	Tom Willett	12T84	1962	3:40
15.	Higher Germany	Pheobe Smith	Once I Had A True Love	1970	3:18
15.	Traditional(Roud 170)	Pheobe Smith	12T193	1970	3:18
16.	The Ideal Schottische	The Cheviot Ranters	The Cheviot Hills	1973	4:06
16.	Traditional	The Cheviot Ranters	12TS222	1973	4:06
17.	The Methody Parson	Roy Harris	Champions Of Folly	1975	2:27
17.	Traditional	Roy Harris	12TS256	1975	2:27
18.	The Maid And The Palmer	Brass Monkey	Brass Monkey	1983	5:33
18.	Traditional(Roud 2335; Child 21)	Brass Monkey	12TS431	1983	5:33
19.	Hopping Down In Kent	Louie Fuller	Green Grow The Laurels	1976	2:04
19.	Traditional (Roud 1715)	Louie Fuller	12TS285	1976	2:04
20.	The Devil And The Farmer’s Wife	Walter Pardon	A Country Life	1982	2:53
20.	Traditional(Roud 160; Child 278)	Walter Pardon	12TS392	1982	2:53

=== Disk three - Ireland Boys, Hurrah ===
The third disk concentrates on the Folk music of Ireland, including traditional musicians from all the provinces. The disk features more instrumental tracks than the other national disks. A number of the tracks were recorded outside Ireland from members of the Irish diaspora. Track 8 features an unnamed slow air before the Blackbird. Track 23 features the unusual folk music instrument the hammer dulcimer. All the recordings were originally issued on Topic 12 inch vinyl albums except track 9 which was issued on a 10-inch vinyl record.

Track	Title/Composer	Artist(s)	Original Album	Year of Issue	Length(Mins)
1.	The Rising Sun / The Pope’s Toe	Jackie Daly	Music from Sliabh Luachra Vol. 6	1977	2:36
1.	Traditional	Jackie Daly	12TS358	1977	2:36
2.	The Waterford Boys	Paddy Tunney	A Wild Bees’ Nest	1965	3:40
2.	Traditional(Roud 3107)	Paddy Tunney	12T139	1965	3:40
3.	The Banks Of Red Roses	Sarah Makem	Sarah Makem : Ulster Ballad Singer	1968	3:02
3.	Traditional(Roud 603)	Sarah Makem	12T182	1968	3:02
4.	Gillan’s Apples / The Prize Jig	John Doonan & John Wright	The Lark In The Clear Air	1974	2:05
4.	Traditional	John Doonan & John Wright	12TS230	1974	2:05
5.	Slieve Gallon Brae	The McPeake Family	Irish Traditional Folk Songs & Music	1962	2:00
5.	Traditional(Roud 1420)	The McPeake Family	12T87	1962	2:00
6.	Paddy Ryan’s Dream / Mamma’s Pet	Seamus Tansey with Reg Hall	The Breeze From Erin	1969	2:15
6.	Traditional	Seamus Tansey with Reg Hall	12T184	1969	2:15
7.	My Irish Molly O	The Flanagan Brothers	The Flanagan Brothers	1979	3:02
7.	E Schwarz(Roud 2168)	The Flanagan Brothers	12T365	1979	3:02
8.	The Blackbird	Seamus Ennis	The Wandering Minstrel	1974	4:16
8.	Traditional	Seamus Ennis	12TS250	1974	4:16
9.	The Factory Girl	Margaret Barry	Street Songs & Fiddle Tunes Of Ireland	1958	3:18
9.	Traditional(Roud 1659)	Margaret Barry	10T6	1958	3:18
10.	Roaring Mary / The Old Torn Petticoat	The Irish Country Four	Songs, Ballads & Instrumental Tunes From Ulster	1971	2:29
10.	Traditional	The Irish Country Four	12TS209	1971	2:29
11.	Spailpin a Rún	Sean Mac Donnchadha	More Grand Airs From Connemara	1971	2:32
11.	Traditional	Sean Mac Donnchadha	12TS202	1971	2:32
12.	The Choice Wife	Willie Clancy	The Breeze From Erin	1969	3:06
12.	Traditional	Willie Clancy	12T184	1969	3:06
13.	The Tinker’s Old Budget	Mary Ann Carolan	Songs From The Irish Tradition	1982	3:12
13.	Traditional(Roud 2993)	Mary Ann Carolan	12TS362	1982	3:12
14.	Paidriag O’Keefe’s/ Con Cassidy’s	The Boys of the Lough	In The tradition	1981	1:45
14.	Traditional	The Boys of the Lough	12TS422	1981	1:45
15.	Dowd’s Favourite	Hugh Gillespie	Classic Recordings of Irish Traditional Fiddle Music	1978	2:54
15.	Traditional	Hugh Gillespie	12T364	1978	2:54
16.	Wife Of The Bold Tenant Farmer	Joe Heaney	Irish Traditional Songs In Gaelic & English	1963	3:05
16.	Traditional(Roud 5164)	Joe Heaney	12T91	1963	3:05
17.	The Music In The Glen / The Greenfields Of America	The O’Halloran Brothers	Men Of The Ireland	1976	2:18
17.	Traditional	The O’Halloran Brothers	12TS305	1976	2:18
18.	The Knight Templar’s Dream	Len Graham	Wind And Water	1977	3:55
18.	Traditional(Roud 21138)	Len Graham	12TS334	1977	3:55
19.	The Yellow Tinker / The Humours Of Scarriff	Sean O’Shea & Bobby Casey	Paddy In The Smoke	1998	1:53
19.	Traditional	Sean O’Shea & Bobby Casey	12T176	1998	1:53
20.	He Rolled Her To The Wall	Frank Harte	Through Dublin City	1973	3:31
20.	Traditional(Roud 36; Child 46)	Frank Harte	12T218	1973	3:31
21.	The Heather Breeze / The Traveller	The Russell Family	The Russell Family of Doolin, County Clare	1975	2:29
21.	Traditional	The Russell Family	12TS251	1975	2:29
22.	The Patriot Game	Dominic Behan	Easter Weekend and After: Songs of the IRA	1959	4:01
22.	Dominic Behan(Roud 18464)	Dominic Behan	12T44	1959	4:01
23.	The Belfast Hornpipe / The Rights Of Man	John Rea	Traditional Music on the Hammer Dulcimer	1979	3:41
23.	Traditional	John Rea	12TS373	1979	3:41
24.	Bridie Morley / Duignan’s Favourite	Packie Duignan & Seamus Horan	Music From County Leitrim	1978	2:20
24.	Traditional	Packie Duignan & Seamus Horan	12TS339	1978	2:20

=== Disk four - Scotia The Brave ===
This disk covers Scottish folk music with both traditional and revival artists included. All the recordings are from Topic releases in a variety of formats from singles through vinyl albums to CDs.

Track	Title/Composer	Artist(s)	Original Album	Year of Issue	Length(Mins)
1.	Miss Drummond Of Perth / Fiddler’s Joy / Traditional Reel / The Shetland Reel	Battlefield Band	Stand Easy	1979	3:22
1.	Traditional	Battlefield Band	12TS404	1979	3:22
2.	Come All Ye Fisher Lasses	The Fisher Family	The Fisher Family	1966	1:45
2.	Ewan MacCollCRoud 12504)	The Fisher Family	12T137	1966	1:45
3.	Queen Among The Heather	Belle Stewart	Queen Among The Heather	1977	4:24
3.	Traditional(Roud 375)	Belle Stewart	12TS307	1977	4:24
4.	Cullen Bay / Jig O’Slurs / Seagull	Kentigern	Kentigern 12TS394	1979	4:24
4.	Ian Duncan/G S MacLeman/Donald MacLeod	Kentigern	12TS394	1979	4:24
5.	Wi My Roving Eye	Norman Kennedy	Scots Songs and Ballads	1968	3:31
5.	Traditional(Roud 866, Laws O17)	Norman Kennedy	12T178	1968	3:31
6.	Blue Bleezin’ Blind Drunk	Cilla Fisher	Cilla And Artie	1979	3:13
6.	Traditional(Roud 6333)	Cilla Fisher	12TS405	1979	3:13
7.	Soldier’s Joy	Tom Anderson & Aly Bain	The Silver Bow	1976	2:21
7.	Traditional	Tom Anderson & Aly Bain	12TS281	1976	2:21
8.	The Dowie Dens Of Yarrow	Gordeanna McCulloch	New Voices from Scotland	1965	4:12
8.	Traditional(Roud 13; Child 214)	Gordeanna McCulloch	12T133	1965	4:12
9.	Erin Go Bragh	Dick Gaughan	Handful Of Earth	1981	4:28
9.	Traditional(Roud 1627; Laws Q20)	Dick Gaughan	12TS419	1981	4:28
10.	Young Jimmy Foyers	Sheila Stewart	A Story I'm Just About To Tell	1998	2:46
10.	Traditional(Roud 1941)	Sheila Stewart	TSCD658	1998	2:46
11.	Kempy Kaye	Jock Tamson’s Bairns	The Lasses Fashion	1982	3:43
11.	Traditional(Roud 32; Child 33)	Jock Tamson’s Bairns	12TS424	1982	3:43
12.	Lady Eliza	Winnie Campbell	The Singing Campbells 12T120	1965	3:12
12.	Traditional(Roud 112; Child 269)	Winnie Campbell	12T120	1965	3:12
13.	Tilley Plump / Auld Foula Reel / Oot And In Da Harbour	Curlew	Fiddle Music From Shetland And Beyond	1985	2:37
13.	Traditional	Curlew	12TS435	1985	2:37
14.	Herd Laddie O’ The Glen	Willie Scott	The Shepherd’s Song	1968	3:40
14.	Willie Scott	Willie Scott	12T183	1968	3:40
15.	The Fireman’s Not For Me	Isla Cameron	Moses Of The Mail / The Fireman’s Not For Me	1951	2:35
15.	Traditional	Isla Cameron	TRC51	1951	2:35
16.	Dance With Me, Morag	Isabel Sutherland	Vagrant Songs Of Scotland	1966	1:00
16.	Traditional	Isabel Sutherland	12T151	1966	1:00
17.	The Wind That Blew The Bonnie Lassie’s Plaidie Awa’	Jimmy McBeath	Wild Rover No More	1967	3:42
17.	Traditional(Roud 2574)	Jimmy McBeath	12T173	1967	3:42
18.	MacCrimmon’s Lament	Jeannie Robertson	Jeannie Robertson	1959	4:19
18.	Traditional(Roud 5134)	Jeannie Robertson	10T52	1959	4:19
19.	The Gallant Forty Twa	Ian Manuel	The Dales Of Caledonia	1977	3:20
19.	Traditional(Roud 1877)	Ian Manuel	12TS301	1977	3:20
20.	The Twa Corbies	Ray & Archie Fisher	Far O’er The Forth	1961	2:05
20.	Traditional(Roud 5; Child 26)	Ray & Archie Fisher	TOP67	1961	2:05
21.	Boulavogue	Davie Stewart	Davie Stewart	1978 recorded in 1954	3:48
21.	Traditional(Roud 2356)	Davie Stewart	12T293	1978 recorded in 1954	3:48
22.	The Wandering Piper	John D. Burgess	King of the Highland Pipers	1969	2:10
22.	Traditional	John D. Burgess	12T199	1969	2:10

=== Disk five - The Singer & The Song ===
This disk concentrates on compositions in a traditional style with the composer often singing the song. All the recordings were issued on either Topic or Special Delivery.

Track	Title/Composer	Artist(s)	Original Album	Year of Issue	Length(Mins)
1.	Unity (Raise Your Banners High)	John Tams	Unity	2000	4:47
1.	John Tams	John Tams	TSCD508	2000	4:47
2.	The Dominion Of The Sword	Martin Carthy	Right Of Passage	1988	3:32
2.	Traditional, new words Martin Carthy	Martin Carthy	TSCD452	1988	3:32
3.	The Sun Is Burning	The Ian Campbell Folk Group	The Sun Is Burning single	1963	2:23
3.	Ian Campbell	The Ian Campbell Folk Group	STOP102	1963	2:23
4.	Go Down Ye Murderers	Ewan MacColl	Chorus From The Gallows	1960	3:25
4.	Ewan MacColl	Ewan MacColl	12T16	1960	3:25
5.	Police Patrol	Bob Davenport	The Common Stone	2004	1:45
5.	Bob Davenport	Bob Davenport	TSCD552	2004	1:45
6.	Two Tears	Eliza Carthy	Dreams Of Breathing Underwater	2008	4:14
6.	Eliza Carthy & Ben Ivitsky	Eliza Carthy	TSCD571	2008	4:14
7.	Never Any Good	Martin Simpson	Prodigal Son	2007	5:20
7.	Martin Simpson	Martin Simpson	TSCD567	2007	5:20
8.	Both Sides Of The Tweed	Dick Gaughan	Handful Of Earth	1981	3:38
8.	Dick Gaughan(Roud 8913)	Dick Gaughan	12TS419	1981	3:38
9.	George’s Son	John Kirkpatrick with Brass Monkey	See How It Runs	1986	4:56
9.	John Kirkpatrick	John Kirkpatrick with Brass Monkey	12TS442	1986	4:56
10.	Reconciliation	Ron Kavana	Home Fire	1991	4:34
10.	Ron Kavana	Ron Kavana	SPDCD1043	1991	4:34
11.	Stumbling On	Lal Waterson & Oliver Knight	Once In A Blue Moon	1996	4:05
11.	Lal Waterson & Oliver Knight	Lal Waterson & Oliver Knight	TSCD478	1996	4:05
12.	Acceptable Losses	John B Spencer	Out With A Bang	1986	2:56
12.	John B Spencer	John B Spencer	12TS444	1986	2:56
13.	Ships Of Shame	Steve Ashley	Time & Tide	2007	3:36
13.	Steve Ashley	Steve Ashley	TSCD569	2007	3:36
14.	The Land Of Three Rivers	Vin Garbutt	Eston California	1977	2:48
14.	Vin Garbutt	Vin Garbutt	12TS378	1977	2:48
15.	No Telling	Linda Thompson	Fashionably Late	2002	4:58
15.	Linda Thompson	Linda Thompson	TSCD821	2002	4:58
16.	Dust	Johnny Handle	The Collier Lad	1975	2:51
16.	Johnny Handle	Johnny Handle	12TS270	1975	2:51
17.	Two-Fisted Heroes	Bill Caddick	The Wild West Show	1986	4:16
17.	Bill Caddick	Bill Caddick	12TS441	1986	4:16

=== Disk six - The People’s Flag ===
This disk covers the music that closely reflects the origins of Topic records with the Workers Music Association. Both sides of the original record issued by Topic are featured on this disk as track 1 and track 8. Versions of track 3, Joe Hill, are the third most popular selection on the radio show Desert Island Discs for British Labour Party Politicians, with this version being selected by Ed Miliband. Track 11 is the second track from the Sweet Primeroses album in the compilation. The title track of the album by the Watersons is on this CD with the original album available as a download. All the recordings were issued on either Topic or Special Delivery.

Track	Title/Composer	Artist(s)	Original Record	Year of Issue	Length (Mins)
1.	The Man Who Watered The Worker’s Beer	Paddy Ryan	The Man Who Watered The Worker’s Beer 78	1939	2:42
1.	Paddy Ryan/Traditional	Paddy Ryan	TRC1	1939	2:42
2.	Talking Union Blues	Pete Seeger	Dark As A Dungeon	1956	2:51
2.	Woody Guthrie	Pete Seeger	TRC92	1956	2:51
3.	Joe Hill	Paul Robeson	Joe Hill / John Brown’s Body	1956	3:00
3.	Traditional	Paul Robeson	TRC95	1956	3:00
4.	Masters Of War	Martin Simpson	Grinning In Your Face	1983	5:29
4.	Bob Dylan	Martin Simpson	12TS430	1983	5:29
5.	The Red Flag	Bob Smith’s Ideal Band	Better Than An Orchestra	1983	3:30
5.	Connell	Bob Smith’s Ideal Band	12T320	1983	3:30
6.	The Blackleg Miners	Louis Killen	The Iron Muse	1963	1:17
6.	Traditional(Roud 3193)	Louis Killen	12T86	1963	1:17
7.	No Power On Earth	Billy Bennett	Almost A Gentleman	1978	3:50
7.	Billy Bennett	Billy Bennett	12T387	1978	3:50
8.	The Internationale	The Topic Singers & Band	The Internationale	1939	2:48
8.	Degetyer	The Topic Singers & Band	TRC1	1939	2:48
9.	To The Begging I Will Go	Ewan MacColl	The Manchester Angel	1966	2:34
9.	Traditional	Ewan MacColl	12T147	1966	2:34
10.	The Hand-Loom Weaver’s Lament	Harry Boardman	Deep Lancashire	1968	2:40
10.	Traditional	Harry Boardman	12T188	1968	2:40
11.	The Rigs Of The Time	Shirley Collins	The Sweet Primeroses	1967	3:09
11.	Traditional(Roud 867)	Shirley Collins	12T170	1967	3:09
12.	Greedy Landlord	Stan Kelly with Leon Rosselson	Songs For Swinging Landlords To	1961	2:48
12.	Fred Dallas/Traditional	Stan Kelly with Leon Rosselson	TOP60	1961	2:48
13.	Time To Ring Some Changes	Richard Thompson	Hard Cash	1990	3:42
13.	Richard Thompson	Richard Thompson	SPDCD1027	1990	3:42
14.	Sixteen Tons	Ewan MacColl with Brian Daly	Sixteen Tons / The Swan-Necked Valve	1956	2:01
14.	Traditional(Roud 15162)	Ewan MacColl with Brian Daly	TRC97	1956	2:01
15.	Peat Bog Soldiers	The Ian Campbell Folk Group	Songs Of Protest	1962	1:40
15.	Unknown	The Ian Campbell Folk Group	TOP82	1962	1:40
16.	Aa’m Glad The Strike’s Done	The High Level Ranters	The Bonny Pit Laddie	1975	3:06
16.	Traditional	The High Level Ranters	12TS271/2	1975	3:06
17.	Three Score And Ten	The Watersons	New Voices	1965	3:29
17.	William Delph/Traditional(Roud 16873)	The Watersons	12T125	1965	3:29
18.	Dirty Old Town	Ewan MacColl	Dirty Old Town / Sheffield Apprentice	1952	2:44
18.	Ewan MacColl	Ewan MacColl	TRC56	1952	2:44
19.	The Liverpool Barrow Boys	The Spinners	Songs Spun In Liverpool	1961	1:25
19.	Traditional	The Spinners	TOP69	1961	1:25
20.	The Weaver’s March	The Celebrated Working Men’s Band	The Iron Muse	1963	0:50
20.	Traditional	The Celebrated Working Men’s Band	12T86	1963	0:50
21.	We Poor Labouring Men	Waterson–Carthy	Broken Ground	1999	5:48
21.	Traditional(Roud 1394)	Waterson–Carthy	TSCD509	1999	5:48
22.	Perfumes Of Arabia	Martin Carthy & Dave Swarbrick	Skin & Bone	1992	3:07
22.	Maggie Holland	Martin Carthy & Dave Swarbrick	SPDCD1046	1992	3:07
23.	Hot Asphalt	Bob Davenport & The Rakes	Wor Geordie	1962	2:01
23.	Bob Davenport	Bob Davenport & The Rakes	TOP83	1962	2:01

=== Disk seven - . . . even more treasures from the Topic catalogue ===
The seventh and last disk in the set contains more tracks from the Topic records catalogue and features a number from non-English speaking countries. Three of the tracks feature music from the Balkans, two of the albums collected by A. L. Lloyd and one by Wolf Dietrich. Acts from the United States are well represented. All the recordings were issued on Topic except track 18 which was issued on a Free Reed album. and include 1 of the Topic World Series Albums.

Track	Title/Composer	Artist(s)	Original Album	Year of Issue	Length (Mins)
1.	Skye Crofter’s / The Swallow Tail	Billy Pigg	Wild Hills O’Wannie – The Small Pipes of Northumbria	1974	3:22
1.	Traditional	Billy Pigg	12TS227	1974	3:22
2.	While Gamekeepers Lie Sleeping	June Tabor	Airs & Graces	1976	1:44
2.	Traditional(Roud 363)	June Tabor	12TS298	1976	1:44
3.	Boi Se Otvori	Roza Tsetkova	Folk Music of Bulgaria	1964	1:20
3.	Traditional	Roza Tsetkova	12T107	1964	1:20
4.	John Barleycorn	Tim Van Eyken	Stiffs Lovers Holymen Thieves	2006	6:07
4.	Traditional(Roud 164)	Tim Van Eyken	TSCD565	2006	6:07
5.	The Girl On The Greenbriar Shore	Tom Paley & Peggy Seeger	Who's Going To Shoe Your Pretty Little Foot? Who's Going To Glove Your Hand	1964	2:31
5.	Traditional(Roud 17338)	Tom Paley & Peggy Seeger	12T113	1964	2:31
6.	The Happy One-Step / Green Willis	The House Band	Word Of Mouth	1988	2:46
6.	Traditional	The House Band	12TS451	1988	2:46
7.	Clyde Water	Nic Jones	Game Set Match	2006	6:02
7.	Traditional(Roud 91; Child 216)	Nic Jones	TSCD566	2006	6:02
8.	Baranca	Vlado & Nikola Robanovski	Folk Music of Yugoslavia	1973	2:34
8.	Traditional	Vlado & Nikola Robanovski	12TS224	1973	2:34
9.	Georgie	Levi Smith	Songs of the Open Road	1975	1:28
9.	Traditional(Roud 90; Child 209)	Levi Smith	12T253	1975	1:28
10.	Jenny Lind	Scan Tester & Rabbidy Baxter	Boscastle Breakdown	1974	1:59
10.	Traditional	Scan Tester & Rabbidy Baxter	12T240	1974	1:59
11.	Worcester City	Eliza Carthy	Anglicana	2002	4:48
11.	Traditional(Roud 218, Laws P30)	Eliza Carthy	TSCD539	2002	4:48
12.	Talking Dustbowl Blues	Ramblin’ Jack Elliott	Woody Guthrie's Blues	1957	2:54
12.	Traditional(Roud 16650)	Ramblin’ Jack Elliott	8T5	1957	2:54
13.	Kaba Vençe	Refki Taho, Hysen Zizolli & Ahmet Metolli	Folk Music of Albania	1966	3:01
13.	Traditional	Refki Taho, Hysen Zizolli & Ahmet Metolli	12T154	1966	3:01
14.	The Green Banks Of Yarrow	Alison McMorland & Peta Webb	Alison McMorland & Peta Webb	1980	2:28
14.	Traditional(Roud 172; Child 24)	Alison McMorland & Peta Webb	12TS403	1980	2:28
15.	Johnny, Will You Marry Me?	Dan Sullivan’s Shamrock Band	Dan Sullivan’s Shamrock Band	1979	2:54
15.	Traditional	Dan Sullivan’s Shamrock Band	12T366	1979	2:54
16.	Hamburger – polka fra hardanger	Vestlandsgruppa	Folk Music of Norway	1977	1:55
16.	Traditional	Vestlandsgruppa	12TS351	1977	1:55
17.	Hedger And Ditcher	The Silly Sisters	No More To The Dance	1988	2:41
17.	Traditional(Roud 846)	The Silly Sisters	TSCD450	1988	2:41
18.	Burren No. 1 / Chris Droney’s Favourite	Chris Droney	The Flowing Tide	1975	2:39
18.	Traditional	Chris Droney	12TFRS503	1975	2:39
19.	Nna hamu	The Jauharah Orchestra	Poetry and Languid Charm – Swahili Music from Tanzania	2007	2:40
19.	Shariff Twahir Ahmed	The Jauharah Orchestra	TSCD936	2007	2:40
20.	Little Sadie	Hedy West	Ballads	1967	2:45
20.	Traditional(Roud 780, Laws I8)	Hedy West	12T163	1967	2:45
21.	Fulmine	Andy Cutting (Blowzabella)	Vanilla	1990	2:39
21.	Riccardo Tesi	Andy Cutting (Blowzabella)	SPDCD1028	1990	2:39
22.	No One Stands Alone	Blue Murder	No One Stands Alone	2002	4:49
22.	Jim Davis	Blue Murder	TSCD537	2002	4:49
