= The Bird in the Bush (Traditional Erotic Songs) =

Studio album by A. L. Lloyd, Anne Briggs and Frankie Armstrong
- Released: 1966
- Recorded: 2001
- Genre: Folk
- Length: 54:30
- Label: Topic Records
- Producer: Tony Engle

Anne Briggs chronology
The Hazards of Love (1964)	The Bird in the Bush (Traditional Erotic Songs) (1966)	Anne Briggs (1971)

Professional ratings
Review scores
Source	Rating
AllMusic	4/5 stars

The Bird in the Bush (Traditional Erotic Songs) is a folk album by A. L. Lloyd, Anne Briggs and Frankie Armstrong, released by Topic Records in 1966. The album is a collection of traditional erotic British folk songs, although the album's content is in the form of euphemism and metaphor, like "sport and play". The album was re-released in 1996 by Topic on CD with 5 additional tracks taken from other Topic folk albums of the same period. The album is now available as a download

In 2009 Topic Records included in their 70-year anniversary boxed set Three Score and Ten Lloyd singing The Two Magicians on track five on the second CD.

== Track listing ==
All songs are traditional.

The references in brackets after the song titles are from the three major numbering schemes for folk songs, the Roud Folk Song Index, Child Ballad Numbers originating from Francis James Child and the Laws Numbers from the George Malcolm Laws numbering system.

=== 1966 Release ===
Side 1

1. The Two Magicians (Roud 1350; Child 44; G/D 2:334)

2. The Old Man from Over the Sea (Roud 362; G/D 4:815)

3. The Wanton Seed (Roud 17230) (1.30)

4. Gathering Rushes in the Month of May (Roud 899; G/D 7:1493)

5. The Bonny Black Hare (Roud 1656; G/D 7:1427)

6. The Whirly Whorl (Roud 12573)

7. Pretty Polly (Roud 329)

Side 2

8. The Old Bachelor (Roud 7162)

9. The Stonecutter Boy (Roud 971)

10. The Mower (Roud 833)

11. The Bird in the Bush (Roud 290)

12. The Pegging Awl (Roud 2126)

13. Martinmas Time (Roud 2173; G/D 1:161)

14. The Widow of Westmorland's Daughter (Roud 228)

==== Personnel ====
- A.L. Lloyd, vocals [1, 3, 5, 7–8, 10, 12, 14]
- Frankie Armstrong, vocals [2, 11]
- Anne Briggs, vocals [4, 6, 9, 13]
- Dave Swarbrick, violin [1, 5, 8, 14]
- Alf Edwards, concertina [8, 12, 14]

=== 1996 release ===
1. "The Two Magicians(Roud 1350; Child 44)"
2. "The Old Man From Over the Sea(Roud 362)"
3. "The Wanton Seed(Roud 17230)"
4. "Gathering Rushes in the Month of May(Roud 899)"
5. "The Banks of Sweet Primroses(Roud 586)"
6. The Maids on the Shore(Roud 181; Laws K27)
7. "The Bonny Black Hare(Roud 1656)"
8. "The Whirly Whorl(Roud 12573)"
9. "Pretty Polly(Roud 389)"
10. "The Night Visiting Song"
11. "The Old Bachelor(Roud 7162)"
12. "The Cock(Roud 21234)"
13. "The Stonecutter Boy(Roud 971)"
14. "The Mower(Roud 833)"
15. "The Bird in the Bush(Roud 290)"
16. "The Pegging Awl(Roud 216)"
17. "One May Morning(Roud 277; Laws O17)"
18. "Martinmas Time(Roud 2173)"
19. "The Widow of Westmoreland's Daughter(Roud 228)"

==== Personnel ====
- A. L. Lloyd – Vocals (Songs 1, 3, 5, 7, 8, 10, 12, 14)
- Frankie Armstrong – Vocals (Songs 2, 11)
- Anne Briggs – Vocals (Songs 4, 6, 9, 13)
- Dave Swarbrick – Violin (Songs 1, 5, 8, 14)
- Norman Kennedy – Vocals (Song 10)
- Alf Edwards – Concertina (Songs 8, 12, 14)
- Louis Killen – Vocals (Songs 5, 12, 17)
