= British folk revival =

Folk music movement

The British folk revival incorporates a number of movements for the collection, preservation and performance of folk music in the United Kingdom and related territories and countries, which had origins as early as the 18th century. It is particularly associated with two movements, usually referred to as the first and second revivals, respectively in the late 19th to early 20th centuries and the mid-20th century. The first included increased interest in and study of traditional folk music, the second was a part of the birth of contemporary folk music. These had a profound impact on the development of British classical music and in the creation of a "national" or "pastoral" school and led to the creation of a sub-culture of folk clubs and folk festivals as well as influential subgenres including progressive folk music and British folk rock.

== Origins ==
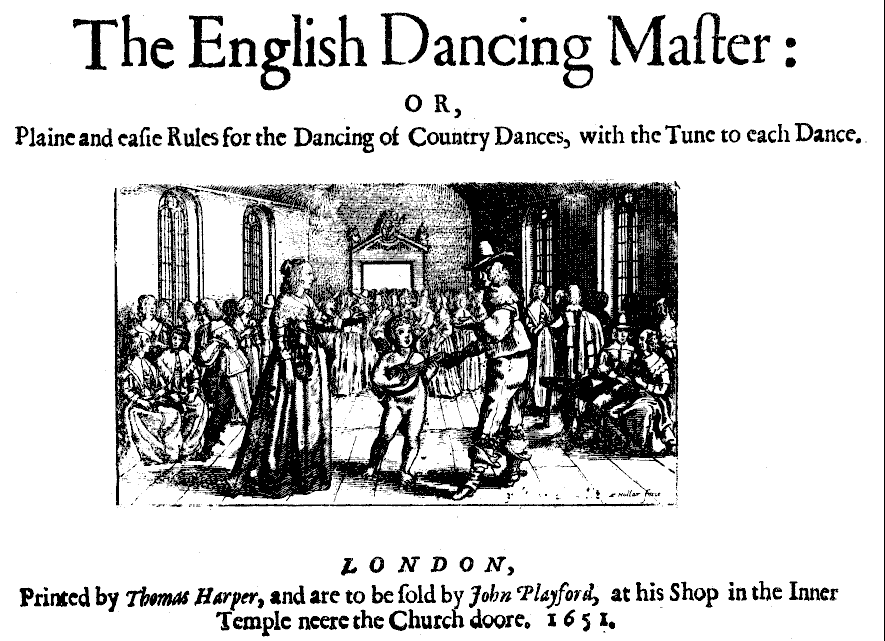
Title page of the 1st edition of The Dancing Master (1651)

Social and cultural changes in British society in the early modern era, often seen as creating greater divisions between different social groups, led from the mid-17th century to the beginnings of a process of rediscovery of many aspects of popular culture, including festivals, folklore, dance and folk song. This led to a number of early collections of printed material, including those published by John Playford as The English Dancing Master (1651), the private collections of Samuel Pepys (1633–1703) and the Roxburghe Ballads collected by Robert Harley, 1st Earl of Oxford and Mortimer (1661–1724). In the 18th century there were increasing numbers of such collections, including Thomas D'Urfey's Wit and Mirth: or, Pills to Purge Melancholy (1719–20) and Bishop Thomas Percy's Reliques of Ancient English Poetry (1765). The last of these also contained some oral material and by the end of the 18th century this was becoming increasingly common, with collections including Joseph Ritson's The Bishopric Garland (1792) in northern England.

In Scotland the earliest printed collection of secular music was by publisher John Forbes in Aberdeen in 1662 as Songs and Fancies: to Thre, Foure, or Five Partes, both Apt for Voices and Viols. It was printed three times in the next twenty years, and contained seventy-seven songs, of which twenty-five were of Scottish origin. In the 18th century publications included Playford's Original Scotch Tunes (1700), Margaret Sinkler's Music Book (1710), James Watson's Choice Collection of Comic and Serious Scots Poems both Ancient and Modern (1711), William Thomson's Orpheus caledonius: or, A collection of Scots songs (1733), James Oswald's The Caledonian Pocket Companion (1751), and David Herd's Ancient and modern Scottish songs, heroic ballads, etc.: collected from memory, tradition and ancient authors (1776). These were drawn on for the most influential collection, The Scots Musical Museum, published in six volumes from 1787 to 1803 by James Johnson and Robert Burns, which also included new words by Burns. The Select Scottish Airs collected by George Thomson and published between 1799 and 1818 included contributions from Burns and Walter Scott.

With the Industrial Revolution the process of social stratification was intensified and the themes of popular music began to change from rural and agrarian life to include industrial work songs. Awareness that older forms of song were being abandoned prompted renewed interest in collecting folk songs during the 1830s and 40s, including the work of William B. Sandys' Christmas Carols Ancient and Modern (1833), William Chappell, A Collection of National English Airs (1838) and Robert Bell's Ancient Poems, Ballads and Songs of the Peasantry of England (1846).

== First revival 1890–1920 ==
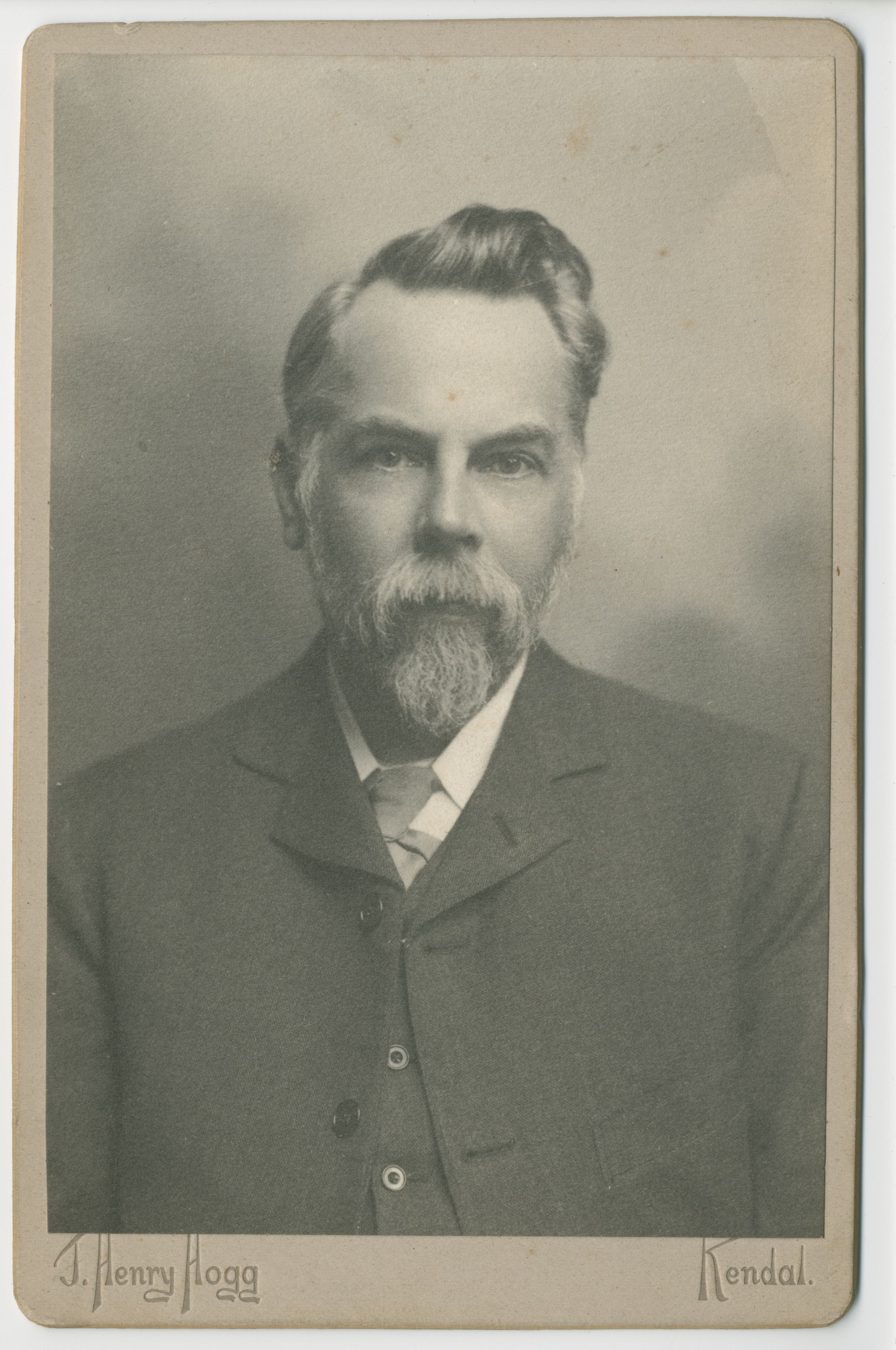
Frank Kidson

These developments, perhaps combined with changes in the nature of British identity, led to a much more intensive and academic attempt to record what was seen as a vanishing tradition, now usually referred to as the first English or British folk revival.

=== Nature of the revival ===
The first British revival concentrated on transcribing, and later recording, songs by remaining performers. An important catalyst for the rapid expansion of this movement around the turn of the 20th century was the work of German expatriate musicologist Carl Engel, who provocatively claimed, in a collection of essays published in 1879, that it seemed to him:

rather singular that England should not possess any printed collection of its national songs with the airs as they are sung at the present day; while almost every other European nation possesses several comprehensive works of this kind.

Engel went on to suggest that:

there are English musicians in London and in the large provincial towns who might achieve good results if they would spend their autumnal holidays in some rural district of the country, associate with the villagers, and listen to their songs.

The significance of Engel's influence on the development of the English folk revival is evident in both the close resemblance of folk music collectors' activities to the fieldwork model he suggested and in the explicit references made by Cecil Sharp to Engel's essays in English Folk-Song: Some Conclusions (1907, p. 2).

Among the most influential of the revival's earliest figures were the Harvard professor Francis James Child (1825–96), Sabine Baring-Gould (1834–1924), Frank Kidson (1855–1926), Lucy Broadwood (1858–1939), and Anne Gilchrist (1863–1954). Kidson and Broadwood were important in the foundation of the Folk Song Society in 1898. Later, major figures in this movement in England were Cecil Sharp (1859–1924) and his assistant Maud Karpeles (1885–1976) and the composers Ralph Vaughan Williams (1872–1951), George Butterworth (1885–1916), and the Australian Percy Grainger (1882–1961). Of these, Child's eight-volume collection The English and Scottish Popular Ballads (1882–92) has been the most influential on defining the repertoire of subsequent performers and the music teacher Cecil Sharp was probably the most important in understanding of the nature of folk song. Sharp produced the five volume Folk Songs from Somerset from 1904 to 1909 and founded the English Folk Dance Society in 1911, an indication of his parallel interest in dance music. His lectures and other publications attempted to define a musical tradition that was rural in origin, oral in transmission and communal in nature. In Scotland collectors included the Reverend James Duncan (1848–1917) and Gavin Greig (1856–1914), and in Wales, Nicholas Bennett (1823–99).

=== Revival and national identity ===
There was a strong nationalist element in the motivation for collecting folk song. As part of a general mood of growing nationalism in the period before the First World War, the Board of Education in 1906 officially sanctioned the teaching of folk songs in schools. One of the major effects of the folk song revival was the creation of a distinctive English form of classical music, known as the English "national" or "pastoral" school. Sharp, among others, promoted the revival of English folk music as a response to the commonly held view that English art music since the death of Henry Purcell had relied heavily on European composers and styles and was therefore indistinguishable from other national forms. This connection between the English folk revival and the English Musical Renaissance movement has been heavily emphasized in historical accounts of English art music throughout the 20th century (for example, see Frank Howes, The English Musical Renaissance (1966)).

In any event, the search for a distinctive English voice led many composers, such as Percy Grainger (from 1905), Ralph Vaughan Williams (from about 1906) and George Butterworth (from about 1906), to use their folk music discoveries directly in composition. Vaughan Williams was also the editor of the English Hymnal (1906) and used many collected tunes and set poems to them to produce new religious songs. Similarly, other composers such as Gustav Holst (1874–1934) and Frederick Delius (1862–1934) wrote music that adopted sections, cadences or themes from English folk music. By the 1940s this particular tendency among composers had begun to subside and other fusions would be more significant in the second folk revival.

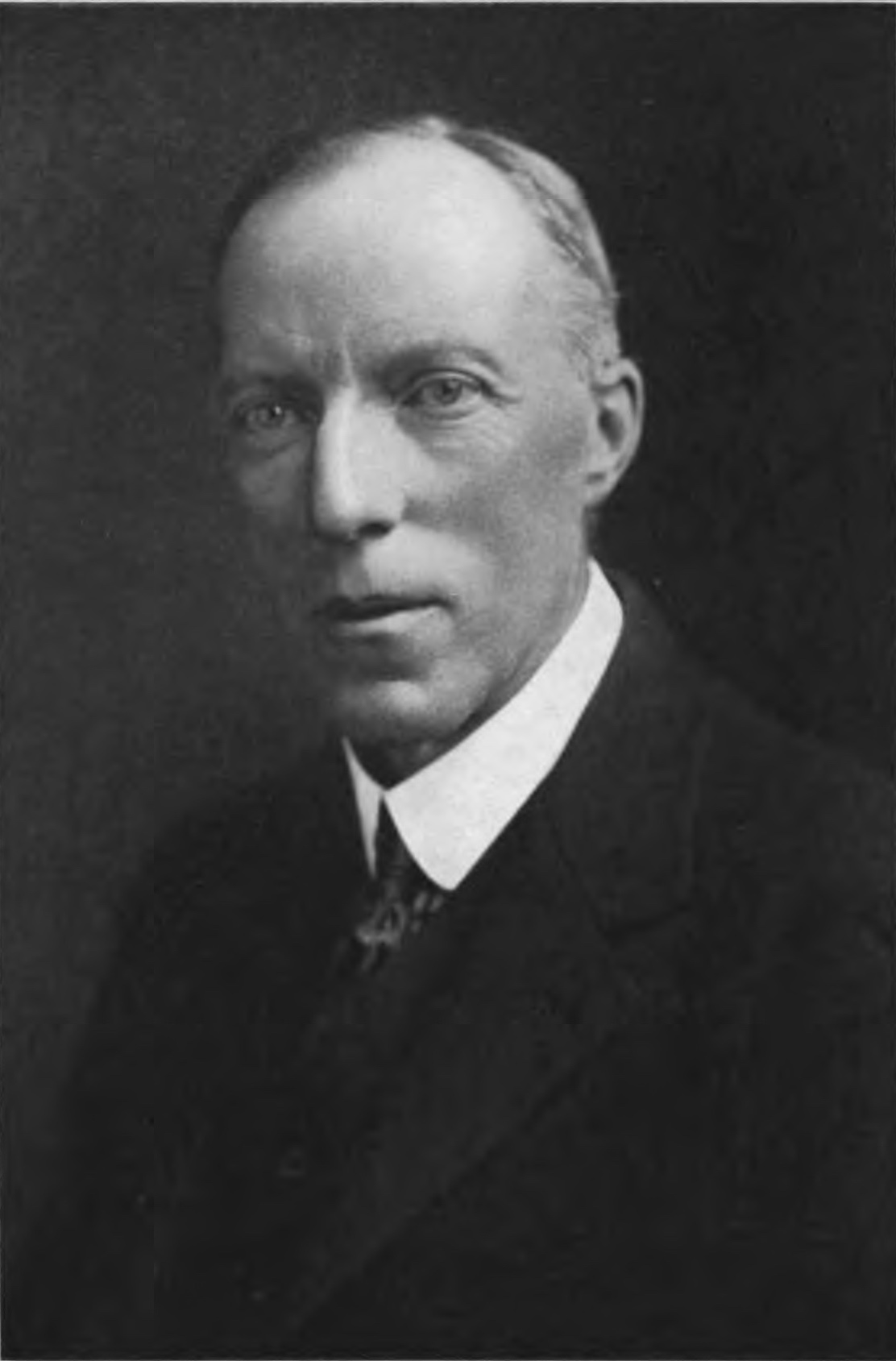
Cecil Sharp

Similar developments could be seen in Scotland in the work of Sir Alexander Mackenzie, who celebrated his native Scotland in three Scottish Rhapsodies for orchestra (1880–81, 1911), and in various concerted works for piano or violin and orchestra composed during the 1880s and 1890s. Similarly, John McEwen's Pibroch (1889), Border Ballads (1908) and Solway Symphony (1911) incorporated traditional Scottish folk melodies.

=== Criticism ===
The first revival has been criticized, particularly by David Harker, as having a romanticized view of agricultural society, of ignoring urban and industrial forms of music such as work songs and those performed in music hall, and of bowdlerising the texts. The focus on collecting performed songs also disregarded the complex, but important, relationship between printed and oral forms, particularly the role of broadside ballads, which were sometimes records of existing songs and sometimes the origin or transmission point for others. Although collectors, from Grainger in 1905 onwards, experimented with new recording technology, it was generally rejected and there was a concentration on transcribing folk song in Britain, in contrast to America, where in a parallel movement John Avery Lomax made extensive recordings for the Library of Congress from 1933. This is thought to have created difficulties, since subtleties of performance have been lost and collectors often adjusted notation to fit their own, often classical, views of music or to fit their own preconceptions.

== Second revival 1945–69 ==
Folk-song collecting continued after World War I, but the nationalist impulse had subsided and with the tradition disappearing there were fewer singers available as sources. In 1932 the Folk-Song Society and the English Folk Dance Society merged to become the English Folk Dance and Song Society (EFDSS). New forms of media such as the phonograph and sound film meant that from the 1920s American music began to be increasingly important and even dominant in popular British culture, leading to a further sharp decline in traditional music. British folk song might have become a purely academic interest had it not been for a second wave of revival with a very different emphasis.

=== Nature of the revival ===
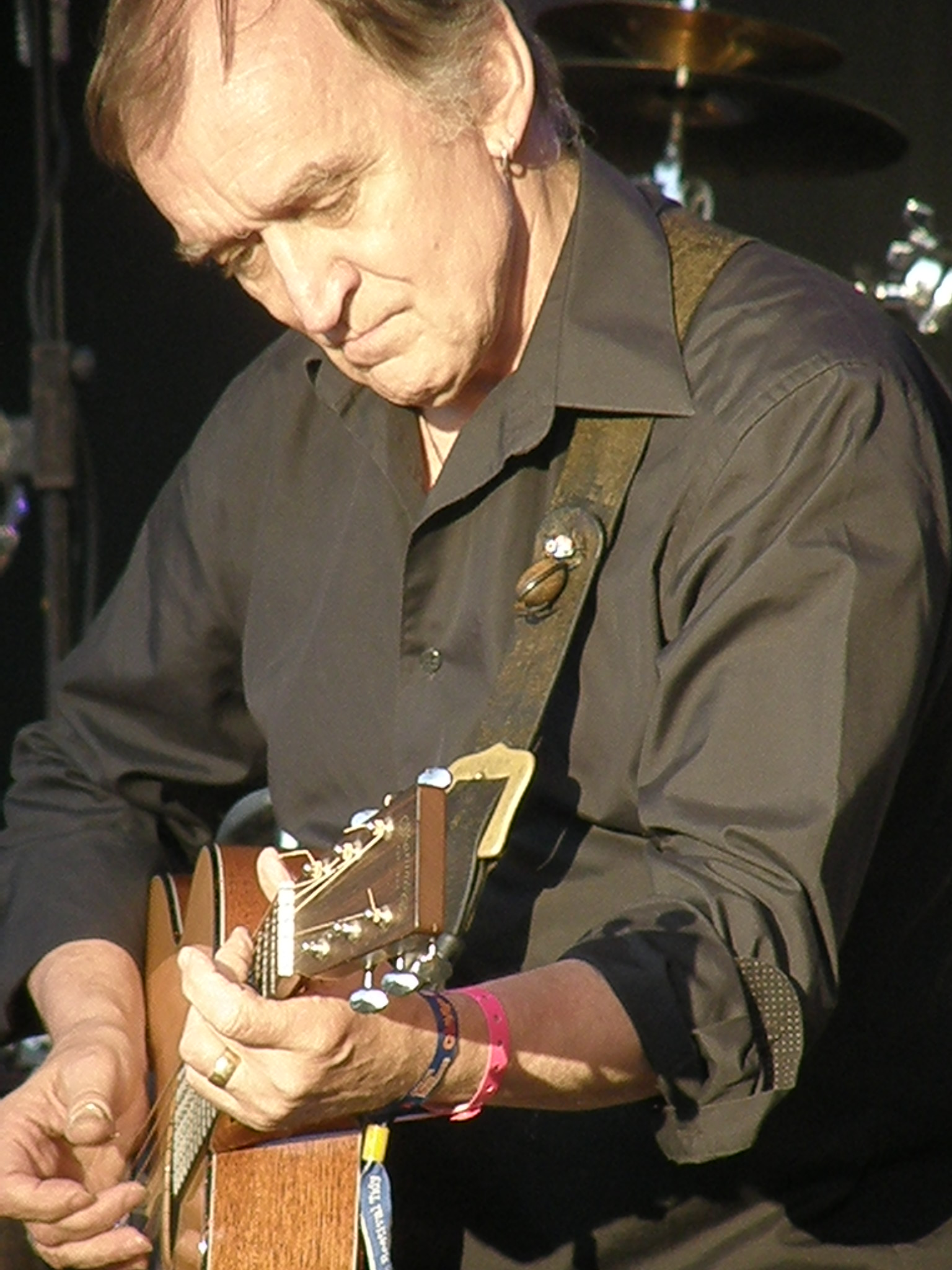
Martin Carthy performing with The Imagined Village at Camp Bestival in 2008

The second revival in Britain followed a similar movement in America, to which it was connected by individuals such as Alan Lomax, who had moved to Britain in the era of McCarthyism and who worked in England and Scotland. Unlike the first revival, which wholly concerned itself with traditional music, the second revival was a part of the birth of non-traditional contemporary folk music. Like the American revival, it was often overtly left wing in its politics, and the leading figures, the Salford-born Ewan MacColl and A. L. Lloyd, were both involved in trade unionism and socialist politics.

Several individuals emerged in England who had learnt the old songs in the oral tradition from their communities and therefore preserved the authentic versions. These individuals, such as Sam Larner, Harry Cox, Fred Jordan, Walter Pardon, and Frank Hinchliffe, released albums of their own and were revered by folk revivalists.

In Scotland the key figures were Hamish Henderson and Calum McLean who collected songs and popularised acts including Jeannie Robertson, John Strachan, Flora MacNeil and Jimmy MacBeath. In Wales the key figure was Dafydd Iwan, who founded the Sain record label in 1969.

The second revival built on the work of the first, exploiting many of its resources. MacColl recorded many of the Child Ballads and Lloyd eventually joined the board of the EFDSS. The society was also responsible for sponsoring a BBC Home Service radio program, As I Roved Out, based on field recordings made by Peter Kennedy and Seamus Ennis from 1952 to 1958, which probably did more than any other single factor to introduce the general population to British and Irish folk music in the period.

However, the second revival differed in several important respects from the first. In contrast to Sharp's emphasis on the rural, the activists of the second revival, particularly Lloyd, emphasized the work music of the 19th century, including sea shanties and industrial labour songs, most obviously on the album The Iron Muse (1963). It also took a more charitable view of the 'morally dubious' elements of traditional folk than the first revival, with Lloyd recording an entire album of erotic folk songs, The Bird in the Bush (1966).

=== Folk clubs ===
The expansion of the revival scene has been attributed to the short-lived British skiffle craze of 1956–58. Spearheaded by Lonnie Donegan’s hit "Rock Island Line" (1956) it dovetailed with the growth of café youth culture, where skiffle bands with acoustic guitars, and improvised instruments such as washboards and tea chest bass, played to teenage audiences. Beside the many later jazz, blues, pop and rock musicians that started performing in skiffle bands were a number of future folk performers, including Martin Carthy and John Renbourn. It also brought a greater familiarity with American roots music and helped expand the British folk club movement where American folk music also began to be played and which were an important part of the second revival. This started in London where MacColl began the Ballads and Blues Club in 1953. These clubs usually met in urban locations, but the songs sung in them often harked back to a rural pre-industrial past. In many ways this was the adoption of abandoned popular music by the middle classes.

By the mid-1960s there were probably over 300 folk clubs in Britain, providing an important circuit for acts that performed traditional songs and tunes acoustically, where some could sustain a living by playing to a small but committed audience. Some clubs developed policies around their musical preferences and which artists they would book. These ranged from "the rural idyll" through "anything which entertains" to "stick to your own culture," the latter meaning "if you're British don't copy American songs and styles." Artists such as Ewan MacColl and Peggy Seeger refused to confine themselves to rural or even early industrial songs, but wrote or brought burning political issues into their repertoire. Other artists who built a reputation performing traditional songs in British clubs included English singers the Copper Family, The Watersons, the Ian Campbell Folk Group, Shirley Collins and Martin Carthy, and from Scotland Alex Campbell, Jean Redpath, Hamish Imlach, and Dick Gaughan and groups such as The Gaugers and The Corries.

=== Topic records ===
A significant factor in the early growth of the revival was the output of Topic Records, founded as an offshoot of the Workers' Music Association in 1939. From about 1950 Ewan MacColl and A. L. Lloyd became heavily involved, producing several records of traditional music. In 1960 the label became independent and was financially secure after the release of The Iron Muse in 1963. In the 1970s Topic released a series of albums by ground-breaking artists including Nic Jones, Dick Gaughan, The Battlefield Band, as well as major figures on the folk scene including Martin Carthy. From the 1980s they also began to reissue their back catalogue on CD. In the late 1990s, with the resurgence of traditional folk, spearheaded by children of the revival such as Eliza Carthy, Topic gained both commercial and critical success.

=== Criticism ===
Criticisms of the second revival include disagreements about native language, style, accompaniment and authenticity. Critics of the approach pursued by MacColl/Seeger and their adherents The Critics Group saw their view of the industrialised working class and "urban" songs in general as romantic as Sharp had been about agricultural workers. Since most folk clubs were located in cities and towns, their audiences were a mix of mainly urban workers, professionals, intellectuals, students, activists and visitors. Few were rural workers, but those who could be said to belong to the urbanised middle class were unlikely to include entrepreneurs, landlords, stockbrokers or senior civil servants. Despite these issues, and the limited scale of the revival, it ensured the continuation of British folk music as a living and performed tradition.

== Impact ==
=== Progressive folk ===
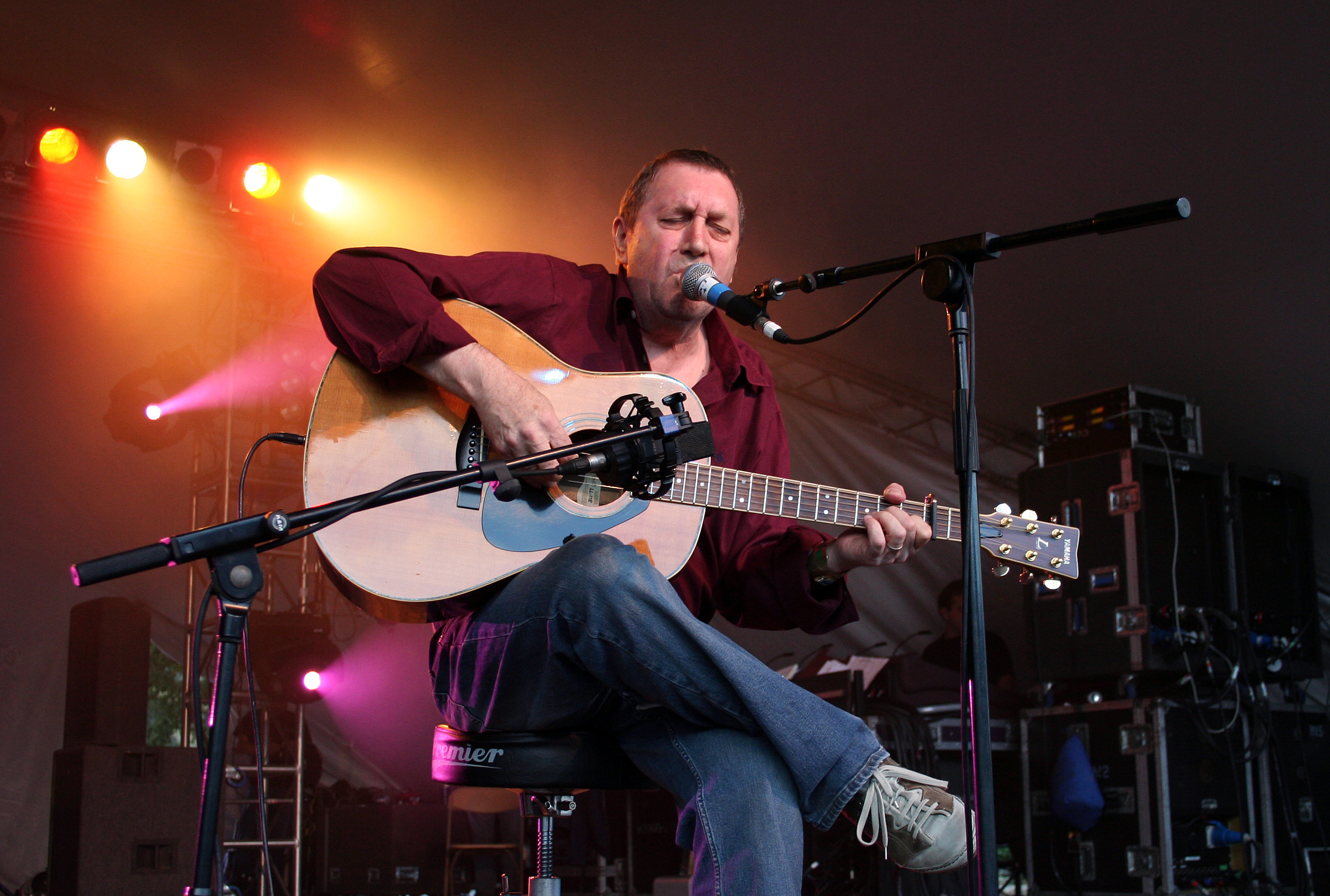
Bert Jansch performing in 2008

The fusing of various styles of American music with British folk also helped to create a distinctive form of fingerstyle guitar playing known as 'folk baroque', pioneered by Davy Graham, Martin Carthy, John Renbourn and Bert Jansch. This led in part to progressive folk music, which attempted to elevate folk music through greater musicianship, or compositional and arrangement skills. Many progressive folk performers continued to retain a traditional element in their music, including Jansch and Renbourn who, with Jacqui McShee, Danny Thompson, and Terry Cox, formed Pentangle in 1967. Others totally abandoned the traditional element and in this area particularly important were the Scottish artists Donovan (who was most influenced by emerging progressive folk musicians in America like Bob Dylan) and the Incredible String Band, who from 1967 incorporated a range of influences including medieval and eastern music into their compositions. Some of this, particularly the Incredible String Band, has been seen as developing into the further subgenre of psych or psychedelic folk and had a considerable impact on progressive and psychedelic rock.

There was a brief flowering of British progressive folk in the late 1960s and early 1970s, with groups such as the Third Ear Band and Quintessence following the eastern Indian musical and more abstract work by group such as Comus, Dando Shaft, The Trees, Spirogyra, Forest, and Jan Dukes De Grey, but commercial success was elusive for these bands and most had broken off, or moved in very different directions, by about 1973. Perhaps the finest individual work in the genre was from early 1970s artists such as Nick Drake, Tim Buckley and John Martyn, but these can also be considered the first among the British 'folk troubadours' or 'singer-songwriters', individual performers who remained largely acoustic, but who relied mostly on their own individual compositions. The most successful of these was Ralph McTell, whose "Streets of London" reached number 2 in the UK Single Charts in 1974, and whose music is clearly folk, but without and much reliance on tradition, virtuosity, or much evidence of attempts at fusion with other genres.

=== British folk rock ===
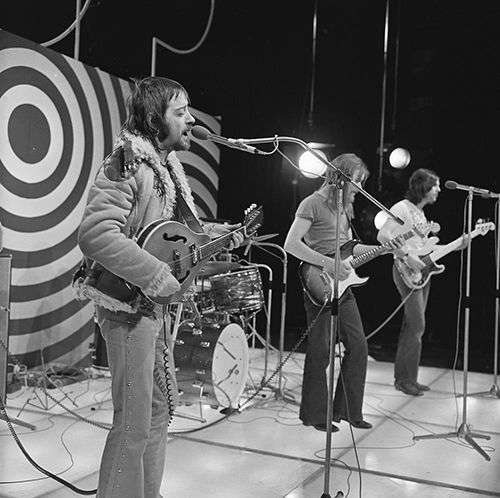
Fairport Convention in a Dutch television show in 1972

British folk rock developed in Britain during the mid- to late 1960s by the bands Fairport Convention and Pentangle, which built on elements of American folk rock, and on the British folk revival. It uses traditional music, and compositions in a traditional style, played on a combination of rock and traditional instruments. It was most significant in the 1970s, when it was taken up by groups such as Pentangle, Five Hand Reel, Steeleye Span and the Albion Band. It was rapidly adopted and developed in the surrounding Celtic cultures of Brittany, where it was pioneered by Alan Stivell and bands such as Malicorne; in Ireland by groups such as Horslips; and also in Scotland, Wales and the Isle of Man and Cornwall, to produce Celtic rock and its derivatives. It has been influential in those parts of the world with close cultural connections to Britain, such as the US and Canada, and gave rise to the subgenre of medieval folk rock and the fusion genres of folk punk and folk metal. By the 1980s the genre was in steep decline in popularity, but has survived and revived in significance as part of a more general folk resurgence since the 1990s.

=== Traditional folk resurgence 1990 – present ===
While in Scotland the circuit of ceilidhs and festivals helped prop up traditional music, from the late 1970s the attendance at, and numbers of, folk clubs began to decrease, probably as new musical and social trends, including punk rock, new wave and electronic music, began to dominate. Although many acts such as Martin Carthy and the Watersons continued to perform successfully, there were very few significant new acts pursuing traditional forms in the 1980s. This all began to change with a new generation in the 1990s, often children of major figures in the second revival. The arrival and sometimes mainstream success of acts such as Kate Rusby, Nancy Kerr, Kathryn Tickell, Spiers and Boden, Seth Lakeman, Eliza Carthy, Runrig and Capercaillie, all largely concerned with acoustic performance of traditional material, marked a radical turnaround in the fortunes of the tradition. This was reflected in the introduction of the BBC Radio 2 Folk Awards in 2000, which gave the music a much-needed status and focus and made the profile of folk music as high in Britain as it has been for over thirty years.

=== "Nu-folk"/"indie-folk" 2005 – present ===
In the 2000s bands and artists appeared who function as cross-over acts between the indie rock and folk scenes. Their music often uses traditional instruments beside electronic music. London's nu-folk scene includes artists such as Laura Marling, Noah and the Whale, Mumford & Sons, Johnny Flynn and that in Scotland, centred on Glasgow and with a more Celtic tinge, with artists such as Findlay Napier and the Bar Room Mountaineers and Pearl and the Puppets.

== See also ==
- American folk music revival
- Australian folk music
- Irish traditional music
- Music of Scotland
- Music of Wales
- Roots revival
- The Wicker Man (soundtrack), composed by Paul Giovanni, takes many cues from British, Irish and Scottish folk music.
