= Bell Bottom Trousers =

"Bell Bottom Trousers" is a reworking of the folksong "Rosemary Lane". A sea shanty version has bawdy lyrics, but a clean version of the tune was written in 1944 for modern audiences by bandleader Moe Jaffe.

== Moe Jaffe version ==
This version enjoyed great popularity during World War II, and has been recorded by different performers.

Bell Bottom Trousers was the last song with a military connection to be featured on the popular radio and television broadcast Your Hit Parade.

The recording by Tony Pastor's orchestra was made on April 4, 1945 and released by RCA Victor Records as catalog number 20-1661, with the flip side "Five Salted Peanuts". It first reached the Billboard magazine Best Seller chart on May 10, 1945 and lasted 15 weeks on the chart, peaking at #2.

The recording by Kay Kyser's orchestra was recorded on April 2, 1945 and released by Columbia Records as catalog number 36801, with the flip side "Can't You Read Between the Lines?". It first reached the Billboard magazine Best Seller chart on June 7, 1945 and lasted 6 weeks on the chart, peaking at #5.

The recording by Guy Lombardo's orchestra was recorded on April 20, 1945, and released by Decca Records as catalog number 18683, with the flip side "Oh, Brother!". It first reached the Billboard magazine Best Seller chart on June 14, 1945 and lasted 10 weeks on the chart, peaking at #6.

The recording by Jerry Colonna was released by Capitol Records as catalog number 204, with the flip side "I Cried for You". It first reached the Billboard magazine Best Seller chart on July 26, 1945 and lasted 2 weeks on the chart, peaking at #9.

The recording by the Louis Prima orchestra was recorded in February, 1945, and released by Majestic Records as catalog number 7134, with the flip side "Caledonia". It reached the Billboard magazine Best Seller chart on June 7, 1945 at #10, its only appearance on the chart.

It was also recorded by:

- Lee Bedford Jr. and the Big D Ranch Hands, released by Imperial Records as catalog number 1111, with the flip side "Cowboy Loop".
- The Four Blues, released by De Luxe Records as catalog number 1000.
- The Jesters, recorded June 26, 1944 and released by Decca Records as catalog number 4452, with the flip side "The Bunyon Brigadiers".
- George Paxton & his Orchestra, (vocal: Alan Dale), released by Guild Records as catalog number 120, with the flip side "Counting the Days until Tomorrow".

Several other versions were also recorded.

== Other versions ==
=== Alternate titles ===
The earliest versions of this song are titled "The Servant of Rosemary Lane". Other titles include:

- "Rosemary Lane", as recorded by Bert Jansch, who lists the first printing date as ca. 1780, and as recorded by Anne Briggs
- "The Oak and the Ash" [Roud 269;Laws K43], for a few versions collected in the twentieth century, for example as sung by Jumbo Brightwell on The Voice of the People Vol 2 (not to be confused with "The Oak and the Ash" [Roud number 1367] recorded by The Watersons on their eponymously named second album and on the BBC documentary Travelling for a Living).

=== Lyrical adaptations ===
- The 10th Mountain Division of the United States Army adapted this song to feature a mountain-village setting and adopted the result, "Ninety Pounds of Rucksack", as its official fighting/drinking song.

== Original lyrics ==
There once was a waitress from the Prince George Hotel
Her mistress was a lady, her master was a swell

They knew she was a simple girl and lately from a farm
And they watched her carefully to keep her from all harm

Chorus:
Singing a bell bottom trousers, coats of navy blue
Let him climb the rigging like his daddy used to do

The 42nd Fusiliers came marching into town
And with them came a complement of rapists of renown

They busted every maidenhead that came within their spell
But they never made the waitress from the Prince George Hotel

Chorus

Next came a company of the Prince of Wales Hussars
They piled into a whorehouse they packed along the bars

Every maid and mistress and wife before them fell
But they never made the waitress from the Prince George Hotel

Chorus

One day came a sailor just an ordinary bloke
A bulging at the trousers, a heart of solid oak

At sea without a woman for seven years or more
There wasn't any need to ask what he was looking for

Chorus

He asked her for a candlestick to light his way to bed
He asked her for a pillow to rest his weary head

And speaking to her gently as if he meant no harm
He asked her to come to bed just so to keep him warm

Chorus

He lifted up the blanket and a moment there he lie
He was on her. he was in her, in a twinkling of an eye

He was out again, and in again, and plowing up a storm
And the only word she said to him was "I hope you're keeping warm"

Chorus

Early in the morning the sailor he arose
Saying here's a 2-pound note my dear for the damage I have caused

If you have a daughter bounce her on your knee
If you have a son send the bastard out to sea!

Chorus

(Extra verse) Now she sits beside a dock with a baby on her knee
Waiting for a sailing ship coming a-home from sea

Waiting for the jolly tars in Navy uniform
All she wants to do my boys is keep the Navy warm!

Chorus

== Recorded versions (Moe Jaffe version) ==
- Joe Edwards
- Four Blues
- Oscar Brand
- Jerry Colonna
- The Jesters
- Art Kassel
- Kay Kyser
- Guy Lombardo and his Royal Canadians (1945)
- Mitch Miller and the Gang
- George Olsen and his orchestra
- Tony Pastor
- Louis Prima
- Diane Renay
- Sun Harbor's Chorus
