= The Time Has Come (Anne Briggs album) =

Studio album by Anne Briggs
- Released: 1971
- Studio: Marquee Studios, London
- Genre: Folk
- Length: 39:07
- Label: CBS
- Producer: Colin Caldwell for Jo Lustig

Anne Briggs chronology
Anne Briggs (1971)	The Time Has Come (1971)	Sing a Song for You (1997)

Professional ratings
Review scores
Source	Rating
Allmusic	4/5 stars

The Time Has Come is a folk album released in 1971 by Anne Briggs. It is her second album, released by CBS, and, unlike her previous recordings, which featured a capella renditions of traditional songs, the album saw Briggs playing guitar on some of her own songs. The album also includes some instrumental songs on which Briggs plays bouzouki, allowing for a more playful contrast to some of the heavier compositions, such as "The Time Has Come" and "Wishing Well" that "drip with pensive sadness".

== Track listing ==
All tracks composed by Anne Briggs; except where noted.

1. "Sandman's Song" - 5:05
2. "Highlodge Hare" - 2:15
3. "Fire and Wine" (Steve Ashley) - 3:30
4. "Step Right Up" (Henry McCullough) - 3:10
5. "Ride, Ride" - 3:20
6. "The Time Has Come" - 2:35
7. "Clea Caught a Rabbit" (Stan Ellison) - 1:50
8. "Tangled Man" - 3:22
9. "Wishing Well" (Anne Briggs, Bert Jansch) - 1:45
10. "Standing on the Shore" (Traditional; arranged by Johnny Moynihan and Terry Woods) - 4:33
11. "Tidewave" - 3:23
12. "Everytime" - 3:04
13. "Fine Horseman" (Lal Knight) - 3:02

== Personnel ==
- Anne Briggs - vocals, guitar, bouzouki

Technical

- Humphrey Weightman - photography
