= Anne Briggs =

English folk singer (born 1944)

- Born: Anne Patricia Briggs; 29 September 1944 (age 82); Toton, Beeston, Nottinghamshire, England
- Genre: Folk
- Occupation: Singer
- Years active: 1963–1973, 1990, 1993

Anne Patricia Briggs (born 29 September 1944) is an English folk singer. Although she travelled widely in the 1960s and early 1970s, appearing at folk clubs and venues in Britain and Ireland, she never aspired to commercial success or to achieve widespread public acknowledgment of her music. However, she was an influential figure in the British folk revival, being a source of songs and musical inspiration for others such as A. L. Lloyd, Bert Jansch, Jimmy Page, The Watersons, June Tabor, Sandy Denny, Richard Thompson, and Maddy Prior.

== Early life ==
Briggs was born in Toton, Beeston, Nottinghamshire, England. Her mother died of tuberculosis when she was young. Her father, Albert, was severely injured in World War II and she was raised in Toton by her aunt Hilda and uncle Bill, who also brought up Hilda's youngest sister Beryl, and their own daughter Betty. For the Easter school holidays in 1959, a Scots friend working in Nottingham, who knew Ray Fisher and Archie Fisher, invited her to hitchhike with him from Nottingham to Edinburgh. They stayed overnight with Archie Fisher, who was at that time prominent in the revival of folk music in Scotland, and through him she met Bert Jansch, who had just begun to compose his own songs. Jansch and Briggs had an instant rapport and were an influence on each other for several years.

In 1960, the Trades Union Congress passed Resolution 42, concerned with developing cultural activities outside London. To implement this resolution, playwright Arnold Wesker was appointed as the leader, with Ewan MacColl and A. L. "Bert" Lloyd heavily involved, and Charles Parker on production. Calling themselves Centre 42, they organised a tour around Britain, hoping to involve local talent at each stop.

At Nottingham, MacColl heard Briggs singing "Let No Man Steal Your Thyme" and "She Moves Through the Fair" and promptly invited her to perform on stage that night. She became a full member of the tour and recorded the same two songs on an album recorded live in Edinburgh later that year. Briggs decided to leave home, just four weeks short of her eighteenth birthday. Centre 42 gave her an administrative job in their offices, liaising with theatres and galleries. She soon acquired the contacts she needed to pursue her own musical career.

== Beginnings of folk music career ==
Briggs attended a folk song club in Nottingham between 1960 and 1962 run by Joy and Eric Foxley in their flat near the Nottingham Goose Fair site. Briggs visited the main British folk clubs which were then becoming well known such as the Troubadour and the Scots Hoose, as well as various Irish music venues. At this time, the emphasis at such venues was on instrumental folk music, and singing was regarded as merely a pause between tunes. A young Christy Moore heard her and was inspired to give more emphasis, in his own music, to singing rather than playing jigs.

Briggs and Jansch lived together in a squat in Earl's Court before moving together to a house in Somali Road, London, where John Renbourn lived, and The Young Tradition also lived for a time. Jansch and Briggs had some resemblance to each other and were often mistaken for brother and sister. It was Briggs who taught Jansch the traditional song "Blackwaterside" which he recorded on his Jack Orion album in 1966.

== First recordings ==
Briggs began her recording career by contributing two songs to a thematic album, The Iron Muse, released by Topic Records in 1963. MacColl and Bert Lloyd sang on the tracks, and Ray Fisher made a brief appearance singing along with Briggs. An EP The Hazards of Love was recorded in 1963. It was an early inspiration for both June Tabor and Maddy Prior.

At about this time, Briggs entered a relationship with a Scotsman known as "Gary the archer", who proved to be violently abusive. She was rescued from this relationship by Hamish Henderson, who accidentally met her and invited her to join Louis Killen, Dave Swarbrick and Frankie Armstrong for a recording project. This resulted in the album called The Bird in The Bush.

== Johnny Moynihan ==
While touring England, The Dubliners met Briggs and thought she would be the perfect musical partner for Johnny Moynihan, a folk singer they knew in Dublin. In 1965 she went with them to Ireland and for the next four years she spent her summers there, travelling by horse-drawn cart and singing in pub sessions. During the winter months she earned money by touring English folk clubs. Her time in Ireland introduced her to the solo sean-nós singing heard in the songs of Irish folk artists, and this was an influence on her later singing style, when blended with the elements of traditional English music which she had already taken up.

Briggs was notoriously wild at this time. There are many stories from this period about her, such as pushing Moynihan and Andy Irvine out of a hay loft and, on another occasion, jumping into the sea at Malin Head, Donegal to chase seals. In an episode of Folk Britannia (a documentary history of UK folk music aired in 2006) Richard Thompson recalled that he only ever encountered Briggs twice and on both occasions she was drunk and unconscious. Her attendance at bookings was so erratic that it was said she turned up only five times between mid-1963 and early 1965.

In 1966, Moynihan and Irvine formed Sweeney's Men. Briggs joined them on tours and learned to play the bouzouki, at that time a rare instrument in Britain and Ireland. She wrote "Living by the Water", which was to appear on her 1971 album, accompanying herself on the instrument.

== Reluctant star ==
The folk-rock impresario Jo Lustig signed up Pentangle in 1968 and a couple of years later took on Briggs. Briggs performed along with the folk-rock group COB (Clive's Original Band) at the Royal Festival Hall in 1971.

In the same year, she recorded an album, Anne Briggs, which was released by Topic. It consisted mostly of Briggs singing traditional unaccompanied songs, but Moynihan plays bouzouki on one track. Later that same year, a second album, The Time Has Come, was released on CBS where she performed her own songs, accompanied by acoustic guitar. The album includes Moynihan's song, "Standing on the Shore," previously recorded by Sweeney's Men. The BBC broadcast a film of the Watersons in 1966, "Travelling for a Living," in which Briggs made a brief appearance. Lal Waterson joined Briggs as a vocalist on the album. Sales of The Time has Come were poor and it was dropped from CBS's catalogue. The album was re-issued in 1996.

Early in 1973 she recorded a third solo album Sing a Song for You with instrumental support from Ragged Robin, a folk-rock band led by Steve Ashley. She was pregnant at the time with her second child. She would eventually move to northern Scotland with her family. It was to be her final studio recording and remained unavailable until 1996, when it was released by Fledg'ling Records. By this time Briggs was living in the Hebrides.

After Bert Lloyd died in 1982, Briggs was persuaded to sing in a memorial concert. Despite coaxing from some of the brightest names in British folk music, she refused to return to the studio. In 1992, Briggs took part in a TV documentary about Bert Jansch, singing "Go Your Way" as a duet with Jansch for the show. The recording later reappeared in the soundtrack Acoustic Routes (1994) on Demon Records.

In recent years her material has been re-released on vinyl for Record Store Day. She appeared in the 2006 BBC 4 documentary "Folk Brittania".

== Influence ==
Jansch and John Renbourn played "The Time Has Come" on their duo record before eventually recording it with the rest of Pentangle on the Sweet Child release. One song, "Mosaic Patterns," which Briggs herself has never recorded, was recorded by blues singer Dorris Henderson. Sandy Denny wrote a song in tribute to Briggs, called "The Pond and the Stream", on Fotheringay (1970).

Briggs has been cited as a favourite by Eliza Carthy, Kate Rusby, June Tabor and Mairéad Ní Mhaonaigh (lead singer of Altan). Charlotte Greig and the Scottish band James Yorkston and the Athletes have said Briggs was an influence on them. David Tibet of Current 93 also mentioned her in an interview.

She inspired several songs, including Richard Thompson's "Beeswing" and Sandy Denny's "The Pond and the Stream."

Briggs' "Go Your Way" has politely been described as "the model for" Beth Orton's "Shadow of a Doubt."

The Decemberists album The Hazards of Love (2009) was inspired by Briggs's album of the same name.

In 2009, Topic Records issued a 70th anniversary boxed set, Three Score and Ten, including "Blackwater Side" from her eponymous album.

The TV show Alias Grace used her version of the song "Let No Man Steal Your Thyme" as its end credit theme.

In 2020 Green Gartside of Scritti Politti covered "Tangled Man" and "Wishing Well".

Robert Plant and Alison Krauss covered "Go Your Way" on their 2021 album Raise the Roof.

== Discography ==
Albums

- Anne Briggs (1971)
- The Time Has Come (1971)
- Sing a Song for You (1997) recorded 1973

EPs

- The Hazards of Love (1963)

Collaborations

Bert Lloyd, Ewan MacColl, Anne Briggs, et al.

- The Iron Muse (1963)

Bert Lloyd, Anne Briggs, and Frankie Armstrong

- The Bird in the Bush (Traditional Erotic Songs) Topic Records,(1966)

Compilations

- Classic Anne Briggs (Topic Records, 1990)
- A Collection (Topic Records, 1999)
