= Reynardine =

Traditional English ballad

Song
- Genre: Folk music

Reynardine is a traditional English ballad (Roud 397). In the versions most commonly sung and recorded today, Reynardine is a werefox who attracts beautiful women so that he can take them away to his castle. What fate meets them there is usually left ambiguous.

== The Mountains High ==
The original English ballads upon which Reynardine are based, most of which date to the Victorian era, are generally found under the title The Mountains High. In the original story, Ranordine (also given as Rinordine, Rinor Dine, Ryner Dyne, Rine-a-dine, Rynadine, Retterdyne, Randal Rhin or Randal Rine) is a bandit or outlaw who encounters a young woman in the wilderness and seduces or abducts her. The song ends with a warning to young women to beware of strange men.

"The Mountains High" appears not to be very old, since only one version was collected before 1800. A version appears in George Petrie's 1855 collection of ballads; other variants appear in a number of broadside ballads from the nineteenth century. Washington Irving relates that the song had crossed the Atlantic and was being sung in Kentucky before 1832, and that it spread through North America in the nineteenth century as well.

A text of a circa 1814 broadside Ballads Catalogue: Harding B 25(1273)

A new Song, called the
MOUTAINS [sic] HIGH.

ONE evening in my rambles two miles below Pimroy,
I met a farmer's daughter all on the mountains high,
Her beauty so enticed me, I could not pass her by,
So with my gun I'll guard her, all on the mountains high.→

I said my pretty creature I'm glad to meet you here,
On these lonesome mountains, your beauty shines so clear,
She said kind sir, be civil, my company forsake,
For it is my opinion I fear you are some rake.

Said he I am no rake, I'm brought up in Venus' train,
I'm seeking for concealment, all in the judge's name,
Oh! if my parents they did know your life they would destroy,
For keeping of my company, all on the mountains high.

I said my pretty creature don't let your parents know,
For if you do they'll ruin me and prove my overthrow,
This pretty little young thing she stood all in amaze,
With eyes as bright as Amber upon me she did gaze.

Her ruby lips and cherry cheeks, the lass of Firmadie,
She fainted in my arms there, all on the mountains high,
When I had kissed her once or twice, she came to herself again,
And said kind Sir be civil and tell to me your name.

Go down in yonder forest, my castle there you'll find,
Well wrote in ancient history, my name is Rynadine:
Come all you pretty fair maids, a warning take by me,
Be sure you quit night walking, and shun bad company,
For if you don't you are sure to rue until the day you die
Beware of meeting Rynadine all on the mountains high.

Wood, Printer, Liverpool.

== A. L. Lloyd's contributions ==
According to folklorist Stephen Winick, although the name "Reynardine" is found in one 19th century version, the association with foxes, as well as Reynardine's supernatural characteristics, first arise in connection with a fragment of the ballad (a single stanza) that was collected in 1904 by Herbert Hughes. The source's recollection of the ballad was that Reynardine was an Irish "faëry" who could turn into a fox. This ability (which is not suggested in any extant version of "The Mountains High") may have derived from the word "Reynardine": renard is French for "fox," deriving from the trickster figure Reynard.

Winick points out that Hughes and a friend named Joseph Campbell (not to be confused with the mythologist) wrote short poems incorporating this stanza and the fox interpretation, aspects of which A. L. Lloyd in turn adapted for his versions of "Reynardine" (see Winick 2004). Winick also shows that Lloyd's versions incorporate several striking turns of phrase, including "sly, bold Reynardine" and "his teeth did brightly shine", that are found neither in the original ballads, nor in Hughes' or Campbell's versions.

Lloyd generally represented his versions of "Reynardine" as "authentic" folksongs (going so far as to claim to have collected the song from one "Tom Cook, of Eastbridge, Suffolk"), but this informant has never apparently been encountered by any other collector. Lloyd's claims have led to the current state of confusion; few modern singers know that the "werefox" interpretation of the ballad is not traditional. Lloyd's reworkings are certainly more interesting to the modern listener than the simple and moralistic original ballads, and have gained far greater interest from singers and songwriters; his versions of "Reynardine" have served as inspiration for many additional modern reworkings.

== Modern recordings ==
Modern versions of the song have been recorded for the following albums:

- 1964: Folk Roots, New Routes by Shirley Collins and Davey Graham
- 1967: Fire & Fleet & Candlelight by Buffy Sainte-Marie
- 1969: Liege & Lief by Fairport Convention
- 1969: Prince Heathen by Martin Carthy and Dave Swarbrick
- 1971: Anne Briggs by Anne Briggs
- 1971: Rosemary Lane by Bert Jansch
- 1972: On the Mountains High by Margaret MacArthur
- 1976: Airs and Graces by June Tabor
- 1977: A Maid in Bedlam by John Renbourn
- 1977: Dark Ships in the Forest by Roberts and Barrand
- 1980: Warbles, Jangles and Reeds by Muckram Wakes
- 1992: Weaving my Ancestors' Voices by Sheila Chandra
- 1993: Live in Concert by Green Fields of America
- 2001: Arthur the King by Maddy Prior
- 2003: Country Life by Show of Hands
- 2005: Milkwhite Sheets by Isobel Campbell
- 2008: Changing Trains by Mozaik
- 2008: Poor Man's Heaven by Seth Lakeman
- 2010: Genuine Negro Jig by Carolina Chocolate Drops
- 2012: La Strega and the Cunning Man In the Smoke by Dylan Carlson (as Drcarlsonalbion)
- 2013: My Celtic Heart by Heather Dale
- 2015: Falling with a Thousand Stars and Other Wonders from the House Of Albion by Dylan Carlson (as Drcarlsonalbion) and Coleman Grey
- 2016: On the Lonesome Plain by Donal Clancy (son of Liam Clancy)
- 2017: Trails and Tribulations by Martin Simpson
- 2021: Fallow Ground by Spiers and Boden
- 2025: Oli Steadman included it on his song collection "365 Days Of Folk".

== See also ==
- Reynard the Fox
- the Gunnerkrigg Court character based on Reynardine and Reynard the Fox
