= Anne Briggs (album) =

Studio album by Anne Briggs
- Released: April 1971
- Recorded: 1970–71
- Studio: City of London Recording Studios
- Genre: Folk
- Length: 41:53
- Label: Topic
- Producer: A. L. Lloyd

Anne Briggs chronology
The Hazards of Love (1964)	Anne Briggs (1971)	The Time Has Come (1971)

Professional ratings
Review scores
Source	Rating
Allmusic	4/5 stars
Tom Hull – on the Web	B+

Anne Briggs is a folk album released in 1971 by Anne Briggs. The songs are Traditional apart from two Briggs originals, "Go Your Way" and "Living By The Water". The front cover photograph was taken by Pat Delap on Little Bealings Heath, Suffolk either in 1969 or 1970.

== Release history ==
In 2009, "Blackwater Side" was included in Topic Records 70 year anniversary boxed set Three Score and Ten as track four of the second CD in the set.

On Record Store Day 2015 Topic Records re-released the album on 180g vinyl.

== Track listing ==
All tracks are traditional; arranged by Anne Briggs; except where noted.

1. "Blackwater Side" - 3:53
2. "The Snow It Melts The Soonest" - 2:23
3. "Willie O'Winsbury" - 5:31
4. "Go Your Way" (Anne Briggs, Bert Jansch) - 4:14
5. "Thorneymoor Woods" - 3:36
6. "The Cuckoo" - 3:11
7. "Reynardine" - 3:01
8. "Young Tambling" - 10:44
9. "Living By The Water" (Anne Briggs) - 3:55
10. "Ma Bonny Lad" - 1:17

== Personnel ==
- Anne Briggs - vocals, guitar, bouzouki
- Johnny Moynihan - bouzouki on "Willie O'Winsbury"

Technical

- Sean Davies - recording
- Humphrey Weightman - sleeve design
- Patrick Delap - photography
