= Rosemary Lane (song) =

Song

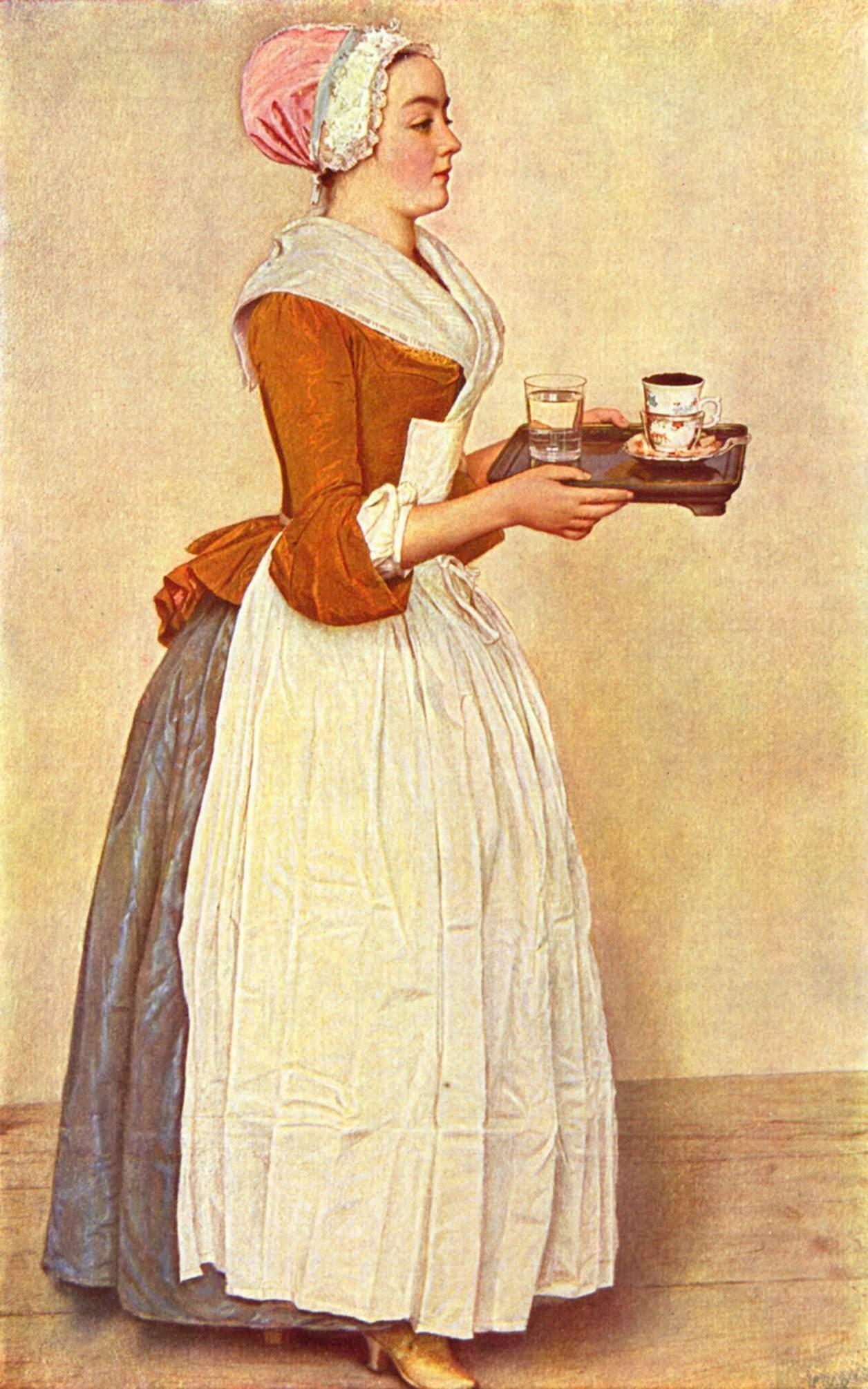
"When I was a servant in Rosemary Lane..." Image by Jean-Étienne Liotard.

Rosemary Lane "is an English folksong: a ballad ( Roud #269, Laws K43) that tells a story about the seduction of a domestic servant by a sailor. According to Roud and Bishop

"An extremely widespread song, in Britain and America. Its potential for bawdry means that it was popular in male-centred contexts such as rugby clubs, army barracks and particularly in the navy, where it can still be heard, but traditional versions were often collected from women as well as men."

An adaptation of the song is known as "Bell Bottom Trousers".

== Synopsis ==
One variant of the song begins with the words:

When I was in service in Rosemary Lane
I won the goodwill of my master and my dame
Till a sailor came there one night to lay
And that was the beginning of my misery.

The sailor seduces the servant and makes grand promises of money as he departs, but in fact he leaves her pregnant and alone to ponder her child's future:

Now if it’s a boy, he will fight for the King,
And if it’s a girl she will wear a gold ring;
She will wear a gold ring and a dress all of flame
And remember my service in Rosemary Lane.

== Variants and adaptations ==
=== Variants ===
Variants of the song exist under titles including "Once When I Was a Servant", "Ambletown", "The Oak and the Ash" (Roud 1367), "Home, Dearie, Home", "The Lass that Loved a Sailor", and "When I was Young". The song first was attested in a broadside ballad dating to between 1809 and 1815. The textual history is complex, and verses have been added freely to versions of this song or borrowed into songs circulated under other titles by oral tradition.

- Some variants make the sailor a "bold sea captain".
- The variants "Home, Dear Home" (or "Home, Dearie, Home") and "The Oak and the Ash" include an additional refrain, from which these versions take their name:

Home, dear home, and it's home we must be,
Home, dear home, to my dear country,
Where the oak and the ash, and the bonny birken tree
They are all growing green in my own country.

- Although the variant "Ambletown" changes the song's perspective to a narration of a letter informing a sailor that he has fathered a child, many lyrics, including the verse "If he's a boy, he'll fight for the king[ ...]", remain constant.
- The song's lyrics are occasionally set to the tune of "Rock-a-bye Baby".

=== Adaptations ===
- William E. Henley used portions of the text of this cluster of folksongs for his poem "O Falmouth Is a Fine Town":

For it's home, dearie, home — it's home I want to be.
Our topsails are hoisted, and we'll away to sea.
O, the oak and the ash and the bonnie birken tree
They're all growing green in the old countrie.
[. . .]
O, if it be a lass, she shall wear a golden ring;
And if it be a lad, he shall fight for his king:
With his dirk and his hat and his little jacket blue
He shall walk the quarter-deck as his daddie used to do.

- "Bell Bottom Trousers", a sea-shanty adaptation of the song, shares the basic plot, though the variant in question turns the tone from wistful regret to bawdiness:

If you have a daughter, bounce her on your knee,
And if you have a son, send the bastard out to sea!

- The United States Army's 10th Mountain Division further adapted Bell Bottom Trousers for a mountain-village setting (e.g., "I was a barmaid in a mountain inn..." and "...and if you have a son, send the bastard off to ski"), in the process borrowing Falmouth's "as his daddie used to do" theme. The result, titled Ninety Pounds of Rucksack, became the 10th Mountain's official marching/drinking song.

== Performances ==
Performers who have recorded this song or one of its variants include Anne Briggs, Martin Carthy, Liam Clancy, Chris Willett, Bert Jansch, Espers, Paul Wassif and Rebecca Hall, Charlotte Greig and John Molineux.
