= Polly Vaughn =

Irish folk-song

"Polly Vaughn" is an Irish folk-song (Roud 166, Laws O36). Known in many variations of its title, it has been printed in broadsides, adapted to plays and stories, and recorded in various versions.

== Lyrical plot ==
A man, sometimes called Johnny Randle, goes out hunting for birds. During the hunt, he sees something white in the bushes. Thinking this is a swan, he shoots. To his horror, he discovers he has killed his true love, Polly Vaughn, sheltering from the rain. Returning home, he reports his mistake to his uncle and is advised not to run away. He should stay and tell the court that it was an honest mistake. The night before Polly's funeral, her ghost appears to confirm his version of the events.

The narrator imagines all the women of the county standing in a line, with Polly shining out among them as a "fountain of snow". Since the fairest girl in the county died, the girls are said to be glad of her death. In some versions, there is no scene of a guilty confession and no ghost.

== Commentary on song ==
Polly wears a white apron, and has a name which usually sounds like "Mailí Bhán". In Irish Gaelic, this translates as "Fair Mary".

Baring-Gould commented that there is some similarity to Celtic legends about "The Swan Maidens". Anne Gilchrist in the Journal of the Folksong Society (number 26) points to many tales about women turning into swans. There is a fairy tale called "An Cailin" (The Fair Girl). A version of this story was recorded as "Cailín na Gruaige Báine" on the album Aoife by Moya Brennan. In Ovid's Metamorphoses, the Aeolian prince Cephalus accidentally kills his wife Procris with a javelin while hunting. Roy Palmer compares this story to that of Polly Vaughn. This interpretation might be called the "Romantic Celtic" version, and has been embraced by Shirley Collins.

There are no versions known before 1806 (there are a number of versions from 1765 to 1806).

Hugh Shields suggested that the story might be based on a real event in Kilwarlin, co. Down. The song is discussed in "EDS" (English Dance and Song) Autumn 2006 edition.

=== Historical background ===
There are versions of this song called "This Shooting of his Dear", in which the protagonist similarly mistakes Polly for a swan, but "never shall be hung for the shooting of his dear."

== Cultural relationships ==
There is a slight tendency for the name "Molly" to be used more frequently in the Irish versions of the song, and for "Polly" to be used in the English versions.

=== Standard references ===
Most traditional songs involving death are included among the Child ballads. The absence of this song from that list has puzzled several commentators, since Francis Child should have known about the song.

It was published in Robert Jamieson's 'Popular Ballads and Songs from tradition, manuscripts and scarce editions', 1806. Jamieson writes about this song, "This is indeed a silly ditty, one of the very lowest description of vulgar English ballads which are sung about the streets in country towns and sold four or five for a halfpenny".

Jamieson says that it also goes by the name "Lord Kenneth and Fair Ellinour". This seems like a misinterpretation, since there is a Child Ballad (number 73) called "Lord Thomas and Fair Elleanor" which involves a man killing a woman.

- Roud 166
- Laws O36
- The website "irishtune" categorises this as tune number 590 "Molly Bán" Irishtune
- In Francis O'Neill and James O'Neill's "O'Neill's Music of Ireland" it is tune number 1474
- In Francis O'Neill and James O'Neill's "The Dance Music of Ireland. 1001 Gems" it is number 703.

==== Broadsides ====
Broadside printings of this song are known from:

- Pitts (London) (between 1802 and 1819)
- Disley (London)
- Kendrew (York)
- Kenedy (New York) 1884
- Pearson (Manchester)
- Haly (Cork)
- J. F. Nugent & Co (Dublin) (between 1850 and 1899)

=== Textual variants ===
The song exists under the titles:

- "Polly Vaughan"
- "Polly Vaughn"
- "Molly Bawn"
- "Molly Ban"
- "Molly Bender"
- "Molly Bond"
- "Molly Vaughan"
- "Molly Van"
- "Polly Von"
- "The Shooting of His Dear"
- "As Jimmie Went A-Hunting"
- "The Fowler"
- "An Cailin Bán" (instrumental version)
- "Fair Haired Molly" (instrumental version)

==== Non-English variants ====
The Irish tune "An Cailín Bán" appears to have evolved separately from the English tune, and appears to be earlier.

=== Songs that refer to "Polly Vaughn" ===
- "Polly Von" by Peter, Paul and Mary
- "One Starry Night" by Black 47
- A cover version of "Polly Von" by Peter, Paul and Mary is included on Chris de Burgh's 2008 album Footsteps, a collection of covers of some of his favourite songs.

And Polly Vaughn arranged by Rodney Dillard and recorded by The Dillards on Elektra Records 1962.

Tia Blake’s Album „Folksongs & Ballads“ from 1972 includes a song called „Polly Vaughn“

=== Motifs ===
According to "The Fiddlers companion" website, the title "Molly Bawn" is an Anglicised corruption of the Gaelic "Mailí Bhán," or Fair Mary (Fairhaired Mary, White Haired Mary). The symbol of a bird to represent a departing spirit from a dead body is common in art, particularly in scenes of the death of Christ.

The idea that a woman might transform herself into a swan is widely known from Tchaikovsky's ballet "Swan Lake".

The word bán in Irish means "white", "pale", or "fair"; bawn is an Anglicized version.

=== Literature ===
The Colleen Bawn is a melodramatic play by Dion Boucicault. Molly Bawn: A comedy drama in four acts (1920) is by Marie Doran. There is also a song by Samuel Lover in the one-act opera Il Paddy Whack in Italia (1841) called "Molly Bawm". Margaret Wolfe Hungerford wrote a novel called Molly Bawn (1878). These stories are unrelated.

The story is adapted and illustrated by Barry Moser in 1992 as the children's book, Polly Vaughn: A Traditional British Ballad, which is set in the Southern United States, and again as part of the 1998 children's book, Great Ghost Stories, complete with an afterword by Peter Glassman.

Samuel Lover wrote tunes as well as novels and dramas. Ciaran Tourish recorded "Molly Bawn's Reel" but it is not connected with the song. The website Reel suggests that Samuel Lover composed the tune.

In Canada, there is a company doing Whale and Puffin tours, called "Molly Bawn". There is a poem called "Polly Vaughn" in Les Barker's book Alexander Greyhound Bell. It is presumably a parody of the song.

== Music ==
The earliest known version of the tune for the Irish version of the song, is earlier than the earliest printing of the words. Edward Bunting's "General Collection of the Ancient Music of Ireland" appeared in 1796. He printed the Irish tune three times in his manuscripts, each time noting it was traditionally the first to by learned by beginning harpers.

Under the Irish title "An Cailín Bán" it was first mentioned in 1839 (The fair girl) as a tune rather than a song. The tune appears in "The Concertina and How to Play It" (1905) by Paul de Ville (as "Molly Bawn"), implying it is for beginners. This would suggest that the words were not with the Irish tune until sometime between 1840 and 1905.

The English tune is known from around 1890.

In Atlantic Canada, particularly Newfoundland, a variation of the original song, titled "Molly Bawn", depicts a man, reminiscing in despair, over the loss of his young bride many years ago. However, nowhere in the song is the manner of the girl's death mentioned. (The Leach song, not Molly Bawn, is a version of Boating on Lough Ree by John Keegan Casey (1816–1849), from "Amatory Poems", ref. Mudcat Discussion Forum)

=== Recordings ===
Section 1 – Performed as a folk song

Album/Single	Performer	Year	Variant	Notes
"The Acoustic Recordings (1910–1911)"	John McCormack	1911	"Molly Bawn"	classic tenor
"Columbia World Library of Folk and Primitive Music: Ireland"	Seamus Ennis	1955 (rec. 1949/51)	"Molly Bawn"	.
"The Shooting of His Dear" (single on HMV)	A.L. Lloyd	1951	"The Shooting of His Dear"	.
"The Voice of the People: Good People Take Warning"	Bess Cronin	2012 (rec. 1952)	"Molly Bawn"
"Folk Songs of Britain, Vol 7"	Harry Cox	1962 (rec. 1953)	"Polly"	.
"Columbia World Library of Folk and Primitive Music: England"	A.L. Lloyd	1955	"Polly Vaughan"	.
"The Maid From Ballingarry & Other songs From the Muscrai Tradition"	John O'Connell	1999 (rec. c. 1960)	"Molly Ban"	.
"Marine Folk songs"	Louis Boutilier	1962	"As Jimmie Went A-Hunting"	Not really a marine song
"Back Porch Bluegrass"	The Dillards	1963	"Polly Vaughn"	1st USA version
"In The Wind"	Peter Paul and Mary	1963	"Polly Von"	Unusual spelling
"Hazards of Love"	Anne Briggs	1964	"Polly Vaughan"	Same as A.L. Lloyd version
"Sings at the Toronto Horseshoe Club"	Mac Wiseman	1965/2001	"Molly Bawn"	Newfoundland Version.
"Byker Hill"	Martin Carthy	1967	"Fowler Jack"	with Dave Swarbrick (fiddle) listed as "The Fowler"
"Ballads and Songs of the Upper Hudson Valley"	Sarah Cleveland	1968 (rec. 1966)	"Molly Bawn"	USa version
"Power of the True Love Knot"	Shirley Collins	1968	"Polly Vaughan"	Tune composed by Collins
"Mainly Norfolk"	Peter Bellamy	1968	"The Shooting of His Dear"	from Walter Pardon
"At It Again"	The Dubliners	1968	"Molly Bawn"	.
"The Voice of the People vol 3"	Phoebe Smith	1998 (rec. 1969)	"Molly Vaughan"	.
"Folksongs & Ballads"	Tia Blake	1971	"Polly Vaughn"	.
"Chelsea"	Chelsea	1970	"Polly Von"	.
"The Voice of the People vol 6"	Packie Manus Byrne	1998 (rec. 1974)	"Molly Bawn"	.
"Folk Songs from Hampshire"	Cheryl Jordan	1974	"Polly Vaughan"	.
"Songs of a Donegal Man"	Packie Byrne	1975	"Molly Bawn"	.
"On Banks of Green willow"	Tony Rose	1976	"Polly Vaughn"	.
"Dark Ships in the Forest"	John Roberts and Tony Barrand	1977	"Polly Vaughn"	.
"Live"	Mick Hanly & Andy Irvine	1978	"Molly Bawn"	.
"You Can't Fool the Fat Man"	Dave Burland	1979	"The Shooting of His Dear"	.
"Step Outside"	Oysterband	1986	"Molly Bond"	.
"Them Stars"	Margaret MacArthur	1996	"Polly Vaughn"	.
"Voices – English Traditional Songs"	Patti Reid	1997	"Fowler"	.
"Racing Hearts"	Al Petteway and Amy White	1999	"Polly Vaughn"	.
"Black Mountains Revisited"	Julie Murphy	1999	"Polly Vaughan"	.
"Put a Bit of Powder on it, Father"	Walter Pardon	2000	"Polly Vaughn"	.
"Far in the Mountains"	Dan Tate	2000	"Molly Van"	Unusual spelling
"Down the Old Plank Road: The Nashville Sessions"	The Chieftains with Alison Krauss	2002	"Molly Ban"	.
"Over the Edge"	Moher	2003	"Molly Ban"	.
"Red colour Sun"	Pauline Scanlon	2004	"Molly Ban"	.
"The Hardy Sons of Dan"	Maggie Murphy	2004	"Molly Bawn"	.
"Song Links 2"	Dave Fletcher and Bill Whaley	2005	"Polly Vaughn"	.
"A Promise of Light"	Jamie Anderson	2005	"Polly Vaughn"	.
"No Earthly Man"	Alasdair Roberts	2005	"Molly Bawn"	.
"Day Is Dawning"	Sussie Nielsen	2005	"Molly Bawn"	.
"Of Milkmaids and Architects"	Martha Tilston	2006	"Polly Vaughan"	.
"Stranded"	Craig; Morgan; Robson	2006	"Polly Vaughan"	.
"Freedom Fields"	Seth Lakeman	2006	"The Setting of the Sun"	Unusual title
"The Weeping Well"	The Great Park	2007	"Polly Vaughan"	.
"A Hundred Miles or More: A Collection"	Alison Krauss	2007	"Molly Bán"	.
"Night Visiting"	Bella Hardy	2007	"Molly Vaughan"	.
"Bring Me Home"	Peggy Seeger	2008	"Molly Bond"	.
"Footsteps"	Chris de Burgh	2008	"Polly Von"	Same version as Peter, Paul and Mary
"Is It the Sea?"	Bonnie 'Prince' Billy, Harem Scarem and Alex Neilson	2008	"Molly Bawn"	Live album recording of a 2006 performance at Queens Hall, Edinburgh. Released in 2008.
"Daughters"	The Lasses	2015	"Polly Vaughn"
"Wild Hog"	The Furrow Collective	2016	"Polly Vaughn"
"Mama's Apron Strings"	Blackberry Blossom Farm	2018	"Polly Vaughn"

Section 2 – Performed as a classical music arrangement

Benjamin Britten wrote many arrangements of folksongs. "Folksong Arrangements – volume 6" contains "The Shooting of His Dear". Ernest John Moeran composed "Six Folk Songs from Norfolk" in 1923. The 5th song is "The Shooting of his Dear". According to Barry Marsh, the song became a basis for Moeran's Symphony in G minor.

Album/Single	Performer	Year	Variant	Notes
"Music For voice and guitar"	Peter Pears and Julian Bream	1993 (rec. 1964)	"The Shooting of His Dear"	The Britten version
"Britten: The Complete Folksong arrangements"	Jamie MacDougall and Craig Lewis	1994	"The Shooting of His Dear"	.
"Down by the Salley Gardens"	Benjamin Luxon and David Willison	2001	"The Shooting of His Dear"	.
"Scarborough Fair"	James Griffett	2002	"The shooting of his dear"	arr Britten
"The Fowler"(single)	Christine Smallman + choir	unknown	The Fowler"	(arranged by Moeran)

Section 3 – Performed as an instrumental

Album/Single	Performer	Year	Variant	Notes
"Traditional Music of Ireland"	Joe Burke with Charlie Lennon	c. 1973	"Molly Bán"	.
"All Around The Circle: 12 Instrumental Selections"	The Stringbusters	c. 1973	"Molly Von"	Unusual Spelling. Instrumental rendition of the Newfoundland variant. Performed on a Traditional Irish-Style button accordion, accompanied by typical Country-Western instrumentation of that era (Electric Guitar, Drums, Steel Guitar, Electric Bass).
"Old Hag You Have Killed Me"	The Bothy Band	1976	"Molly Ban"	In the set called "Michael Gorman's"
"Traditional Music of Ireland"	James Kelly, Paddy O'Brien & Daithi Sproule	1981	"Molly Bawn (White-Haired Molly)"	.
"Carousel"	Seamus McGuire, Manus McGuire and Daithi Sproule	1984	"An Cailin Bán"	.
"A Whistle on the Wind"	Joanie Madden	1994	"Molly Ban"	.
"Under the Moon"	Martin Hayes	1994	"Fair Haired Molly"	Unusual title
"Traditional Music from the Legendary East Clare Fiddler"	Paddy Canny	1997	"Molly Bawn"	.
"The Wide World Over"	The Chieftains	2002	"Little Molly"	Unusual title
"Ragairne"	Seamus Begley & Jim Murray	2002	"Cailin Ban"	.
"Down the Line"	Ciaran Tourish	2005	"Molly Bán"	.
"Bakerswell"	Bakerswell	2005	"Molly Ban"	.
"Duck Soup"	Duck Soup	2005	"Molly Bawn"	.
"In Session"	Eoin O'Neill	2006	"Molly Ban"	.
"The House I Was Reared In"	Christy McNamara	2007	"Molly Bán"	.

=== Musical variants ===
Edward Madden wrote the words, and M. J. Fred Helf wrote the music to a song called "Colleen Bawn" in 1906. The second verse is as follows:

Colleen Bawn when I am gone I wonder will you miss me,
Don't be afraid some other maid Will fall in love and kiss me,
For if they do I'll think of you A waiting here and sighing,
I'll drop my gun and start to run, And home a flying.

The song is about a soldier who longs to return to his Irish sweetheart.

In Canada a song called "Molly Bawn" has been captured by song-collector MacEdward Leach. It has the line:

Oh, Molly Bawn, why leave me pining, All lonely, waiting here for you?

=== Other songs with the same tune ===
The air "Molly ban so Fair" (1905, Stanford/Petrie collection), is probably unrelated.

According to "The Fiddlers companion" website, there is a variant similar to O’Carolan's composition "Fairhaired Mary".

== See also ==
- List of Irish ballads
