= George Malcolm Laws =

American folk-song collector (1919–1994)

- Born: January 4, 1919; Philadelphia, Pennsylvania
- Died: August 1, 1994 (aged 75); Montgomery, Pennsylvania
- Occupations: folklorist, professor

George Malcolm Laws (January 4, 1919 – August 1, 1994) was a scholar of traditional British and American folk song.

He was best known for his collection of traditional ballads "American Balladry from British Broadsides", published in 1957 by the American Folklore Society. He graduated from the University of Pennsylvania, and joined the English Department Faculty there in 1942. He gives his name to a system of coding ballads; one letter of the alphabet, followed by 2 numbers. For example, "Laws A01" is "Brave Wolfe" also known as "Bold Wolfe" or "The Battle of Quebec". There is no immediately obvious logic, but a broad pattern appears: the letter A is for military songs, the letter D is for nautical songs, the letter F is for murder, and so on. The system is limited to 26 x 99 = 2576 distinct labels, and so tends to bring together similar songs. It is a useful adjunct to Child numbers. He includes many songs that Child excluded, and of course, new ones that were found after Child died.

== Examples of Laws numbers ==
- Laws A01 – Brave Wolfe
- Laws A02 – Major Andrews Execution
- Laws A03 – Stately Southerner
- Laws A04 – Paul Jones
- Laws A05 – James Bird
- Laws A06 – Constitution and the Guerriere
- Laws A07 – Battle of New Orleans
- Laws A08 – Texas Rangers
- Laws A09 – Manassa Junction
- Laws A11 – Battle of Shiloh Hill
- Laws A12 – Battle of Elkhorn Tavern

The letters A to H are for native American ballads.

- B

- Laws B01 – The Streets of Laredo

- F Murder Ballads

- Laws F05 – Banks of the Ohio

The letters J to Q are for "American Ballads from British Broadsides". 290 British ballads are indexed.

- J War ballads

- Laws J05 – The Bonny Bunch of Roses

- K Ballads of sailors and the sea

- Laws K09 – Lady Franklin's Lament
- Laws K33 – Coast of High Barbaree
- Laws K43 – Rosemary Lane

- L Ballads of crime and criminals

- Laws L05 – Jack Hall
- Laws L12 – The Rambling Boy, The Newry Highwayman

- M Ballads of family opposition to lovers

- Laws M04 – Drowsy Sleeper, Katie Dear, Silver Dagger
- Laws M32 – The Bramble Briar

- N Ballads of lovers' disguises and tricks

- Laws N07 – Jack Monroe
- Laws N21 – The Female Highwayman
- Laws N27 – The Blind Beggar of Bethnal Green
- Laws N42 – "John Riley", "John(ny) Riley", "The Broken Token" or "A Fair Young Maid All in Her Garden"

- O Ballads of faithful lovers

- Laws O03 – The Foggy Dew
- Laws O35 – The Trees They Grow So High
- Laws O36 – Polly Vaughn

- P Unfaithful lovers

- Laws P02 – Green Bushes
- Laws P24 – The Butcher's Boy
- Laws P25 – A Brisk Young Sailor Courted Me
- Laws P31 – All Around My Hat
- Laws P36 – Pretty Polly, The Gosport Tragedy, The Cruel Ship's Carpenter

- Q Humorous and miscellaneous

- Laws Q02 – Marrowbones

== Bibliography ==
- Native American Balladry (1950, revised 1964)
- American Balladry from British Broadsides (1957)
- American Ballads from British Broadsides: A guide for students and collectors of traditional song (1957)
- The British Literary Ballad: A Study in Poetic Imitation (1972)

== See also ==
- Roud Folk Song Index
