= Charlotte Greig =

English novelist, playwright, music journalist, singer and songwriter (1954–2014)

- Born: 10 August 1954; Crown Colony of Malta
- Died: 19 June 2014 (aged 59)
- Other name: Charlotte Williams
- Occupations: Novelist, playwright, music journalist, singer and songwriter
- Notable work: Night Visiting Songs
- Children: Henry Gregg; Owen Williams of Joanna Gruesome, Ex-Void, and The Tubs

Charlotte Greig (10 August 1954 – 19 June 2014) was an English novelist, playwright, music journalist, singer and songwriter.

== Early life ==
Charlotte Greig was born in Malta, her father was a naval officer stationed there. During her childhood, his career would take the family to Gibraltar and Singapore before returning to England in the early 1960s. In 1962, she attended Charsfield village school, later described in Ronald Blythe's book Akenfield, where she learned to sing folk songs. At the age of 10 she was sent to a convent boarding school, St Stephen's College, Broadstairs, Kent, where she learned to play piano. She studied philosophy at Sussex University during the 1970s, a setting recounted in A Girl's Guide to Modern European Philosophy.

== Career ==
=== Journalism ===
After university, Greig worked as a music journalist in print and radio. In 1990, she presented a six-part series on BBC Radio 1 called Will You Still Love Me Tomorrow on girl groups in popular music. It was based on her own book of the same title, published in 1989. In 1991, she wrote another Radio 1 documentary, British Black Music, and went on to present popular music features for BBC Radio 4's Woman's Hour and Kaleidoscope. By 1998, Greig was working for Mojo magazine, reviewing folk and country music.

=== Music ===
In the same year, she issued the first of her own albums, Night Visiting Songs. It consisted of four traditional songs, with the rest written by herself. This has set the tone for her subsequent albums: acoustic understated gothic folk music. Unusually, she plays harmonium and mountain dulcimer, with occasional electronic additions. Four further albums are collaborations with guitarist Julian Hayman. Her main influences are Lal Waterson and Nico. She appeared on the Topic anthology A Woman's Voice (many other anthologies exist with the same title). In 2007, she curated and contributed to Migrating Bird, a tribute album to the late Lal Waterson, released on Honest Jon's record label. In addition, Greig's song "Crows" was released on a compilation album entitled The Crow Club on People Tree Records, an offshoot label of Acid Jazz Records. In 2014, Greig released "Studies in Hysteria" by Doctor Freud's Cabaret, a collection of songs in the voices of Freud's early patients, featuring a number of guest vocalists including Euros Childs, Julie Murphy, Jon Langford, and Angharad van Rijswijk.

=== Writing ===
In 2007, her first novel, 'A Girl's Guide to Modern European Philosophy', was published in the UK by Serpent's Tail. It was also published in the US (Other Press), and in translation in Italy (Tropea), Sweden (Voltaire), and Turkey (Sel Yayincilik).

She has written two radio plays, The Confessions (2009) and Against the Grain (2010), both broadcast on BBC Radio 4. Her most recent play was a Radio 4 docu-drama to mark the 50th anniversary of the Profumo Scandal, entitled Well, He Would, Wouldn't He (2013), and featuring Mandy Rice-Davies.

She has also written musical theatre pieces. I Sing of a Maiden, co-written with Rachel Trezise, was an exploration of folk song and young motherhood in the Welsh valleys (2008). The second, Dr Freud's Cabaret, with Anthony Reynolds, featured songs in the voices of Freud's early patients, including The Wolf Man, The Rat Man, Anna O, and Dora.

In 2013, her first crime novel, 'The House on the Cliff', under the name Charlotte Williams, was published by Macmillan. She died on 19 June 2014, nine months after being diagnosed with breast cancer. Her second crime novel, Black Valley, was published in November 2014. Her novels also have been published in the US (HarperCollins) the Netherlands (Ambo Anthos) and Germany (Lyx Verlag).

== Discography ==
Albums

- Night Visiting Songs (1998)
- Down in the Valley (2000)
- At Llangennith (2001)
- Winter Woods (2003)
- Quite Silent (2005)
- Dr Freud's Cabaret (2014)

Anthologies

- The Executioner's Last Songs (2003)
- A Woman's Voice (2004)
- Migrating Bird (2007)
- John Barleycorn Reborn (2007)
- James Yorkston:When the Haar Rolls in Covers Disc (2008)
- Crow Club: Various Artists (2009)
- Like the Sun Feeds From Flowers (with Anthony Reynolds) (2010)

== Bibliography ==
Fiction

- A Girl's Guide to Modern European Philosophy (2007)
- The House on the Cliff (2013)
- Black Valley (2014)

Non-fiction

- Will You Still Love Me Tomorrow (1989)
- Icons of Black Music (1999)

Plays

- I Sing of a Maiden (with Rachel Trezise) (2008)
- The Confessions (2009)
- Against the Grain (2010)
- Dr Freud's Cabaret (with Anthony Reynolds) (2010)
- Well, He Would, Wouldn't He (with Mandy Rice Davies) (2013)
