= A. L. Lloyd =

English singer and folklorist

Background information
- Born: Albert Lancaster Lloyd; 29 February 1908; Wandsworth, England
- Died: 29 September 1982 (aged 74) Greenwich, England
- Genre: Folk music
- Occupation: Singer
- Years active: 1950s–1982

Albert Lancaster Lloyd (29 February 1908 – 29 September 1982), usually known as A. L. Lloyd or Bert Lloyd, was an English folk singer and collector of folk songs, and as such was a key figure in the British folk revival of the 1950s and 1960s. While Lloyd is most widely known for his work with British folk music, he had a keen interest in the music of Spain, Latin America, Southeastern Europe and Australia. He recorded at least six discs of Australian Bush ballads and folk music.

Lloyd also helped establish the folk music subgenre of industrial folk music through his books, recordings, collecting and theoretical writings.

== Early life ==
Lloyd was born in the Wandsworth district of London. His father was an AA Patrolman and failed smallholder. His mother sang songs around the house, and according to Lloyd, mimicked the gypsy singers that she had heard. By the age of fifteen his mother had died and his father, an ex-soldier, was a semi-invalid, and Lloyd was sent as an assisted migrant to Australia in a scheme organised by the Royal British Legion. There, from 1924 to 1930, he worked on various sheep stations in New South Wales and it was during this time that he began to write down folksongs he learned. In the outback of New South Wales he discovered that he could access the State Library and order books. His special interests being art and music, he could get a grasp of those topics without seeing a painting or hearing any music. He also bought a wind-up gramophone and began to investigate some of the classical music he had previously read about.

== Career as folklorist ==
When Lloyd returned to the UK in 1935, during the Great Depression, in the absence of a permanent job he pursued his interests in studying folk music and social and economic history, doing much of his research at the British Museum; he is quoted as saying that there is "nothing like unemployment for educating oneself". In 1937, he signed on board a factory whaling ship, the Southern Empress, bound for the southern whaling grounds of the Antarctic.

During this decade, Lloyd joined the Communist Party of Great Britain and was strongly influenced by the writings of the Marxist historian, A. L. Morton, particularly his 1938 book A People's History of England. In 1937, Lloyd's article "The People's own Poetry" was published in the Daily Worker (since 1966 renamed Morning Star) newspaper.

In 1938, the BBC hired Lloyd to write a radio documentary about seafaring life, and from then on he worked as a journalist and singer. As a proponent of communism, he was staunchly opposed to Adolf Hitler, and, in 1939, was commissioned by the BBC to produce a series of programmes on the rise of Nazism. Between 1940 and 1950 he was employed as a journalist by Picture Post magazine but he left the job in an act of solidarity with one of his colleagues.

By the 1950s, Lloyd had established himself as a professional folklorist—as Colin Harper puts it "in a field of one". Harper went to note that, at a time when the English folk revival was dominated by young people who wore jeans and pullovers, Lloyd was rarely seen in anything other than a suit (and a wide grin). Ewan MacColl is quoted as describing Lloyd affectionately as "a walking toby jug". In 1959, Lloyd's collaboration with Ralph Vaughan Williams, The Penguin Book of English Folk Songs, was published.

The 1956 film Moby Dick, directed by John Huston, featured Lloyd singing a sea shanty as the Pequod first sets sail. There is also a brief visual clip of him.

In the early 1960s, Lloyd became associated with an enterprise known as "Centre 42" which arose from Resolution 42 of the 1960 Trades Union Congress, concerning the importance of arts in the community. Centre 42 was a touring festival aimed at devolving art and culture from London to the other main working class towns of Britain. It was led by Arnold Wesker, with MacColl and Lloyd providing the musical content and Charles Parker on production. Centre 42 was important in bringing a range of folk performers to the public attention: Anne Briggs, the Ian Campbell Folk Group, The Spinners and The Watersons.

Lloyd recorded many albums of English folk music, most notably several albums of the Child Ballads with MacColl. He also published many books on folk music and related topics, including The Singing Englishman, Come All Ye Bold Miners, and Folk Song in England. He was a founder-member of Topic Records and remained as their artistic director until his death.

The accompanying book to the Topic Records 70 year anniversary boxed set Three Score and Ten includes a short biography and lists two albums he is closely associated with as classic albums, The Iron Muse and Frost and Fire by The Watersons. Track five on the second CD has Lloyd singing "The Two Magicians" from another album he was closely associated with, being The Bird in the Bush (Traditional Erotic Songs).

Mark Gregory interviewed him in 1970 for the National Library of Australia, and Michael Grosvenor Myer for Folk Review magazine in September 1974.

Lloyd died at his home in Greenwich in 1982.

His version of the folk song "Doodle Let Me Go (Yaller Girls)" was used in the credits and trailer of the 2019 film The Lighthouse.

== Discography ==
=== Solo albums ===
- The Shooting of His Dear / Lord Bateman, HMV B.10593, 78 rpm, 1953
- Down in Yon Forest / The Bitter Withy, HMV B.10594, 78 rpm, 1953
- Bold Jack Donahue / Banks of the Condamine, Topic TRC84, 78 rpm, 1954
- Australian Bush Songs, Riverside RLP 12-606, 1956
- The Foggy Dew and Other Traditional English Love Songs, Tradition Records TLP 1016, LP, US, 1956
- Banks of the Condamine and Other Bush Songs, Wattle Records (Australia) 10-inch LP, 1957
- Across the Western Plains, Wattle Records (Australia) LP, 1958
- Outback Ballads. Folk songs of Australia. Topic Records 12T51, 1958
- English Drinking Songs, Riverside Records (US) LP, 1961. CD Reissue: Topic records
- England and Her Folk Songs (A Selection From The Penguin Book), with Alf Edwards, Collector Records (UK) 7-inch EP
- First Person (Some of His Favourite Folk Songs), Topic Records LP, 1966
- The Best of A. L. Lloyd, Xtra (UK) LP, 1966
- Leviathan, Topic Records (UK) LP, 1967. CD Reissue: Topic records
- Ten Thousand Miles Away: English and Australian Folk Songs, Fellside Records (UK) 2CD, 2008
- An Evening with A. L. Lloyd Fellside Recordings (UK) CD, 2010
- Turtle Dove, Fellside Records (UK), 2014

=== With Ewan MacColl ===
- The English and Scottish Popular Ballads 9 Volumes, Washington albums, 1952
- Blow Boys Blow (Songs of The Sea), Tradition Records (US) LP, 1957. LP Reissue: Transatlantic, 1967. CD Reissue: Tradition, 1996
- Thar She Blows! (Whaling Ballads and Songs), Riverside RLP 12-635 (US) LP, 1957
- Convicts and Currency Lads. Wattle Recordings B2, EP, 1958
- Whaling Ballads, Washington WLP 724 (US) LP, 196x. This was a reissue of the Riverside album above.
- English and Scottish Folk Ballads, Topic Records (UK) LP, 1964
- Bold Sportsmen All, Topic Records (UK) 10-inch, 1958. CD reissue: Topic Records
- Gamblers and Sporting Blades (Songs of the Ring and the Racecourse), Topic records (UK) 7-inch EP, 1962
- A Sailor's Garland, Xtra Records (UK) LP, 1966

=== Compilations and contributions ===
- Blow The Man Down, Topic Records (UK) 7-inch EP, 1956
- The Iron Muse (A Panorama of Industrial Folk Music), Topic Records (UK) LP, 1963
- Farewell Nancy (Sea Songs and Shanties), Topic Records (UK) LP, 1964
- The Bird in the Bush – by A L Lloyd, Anne Briggs, Frankie Armstrong, Topic Records (UK) LP, 1966
- Singing The Fishing – A Radio Ballad, Argo Records (UK) LP, 1967
- "Babbacombe" Lee by Fairport Convention (1971), Island Records: Narration and arrangement
- The Valiant Sailor (Songs & Ballads of Nelson's Navy), Topic Records (UK) LP, 1973
- Sea Shanties, Topic Records (UK) LP, 1974
- The Transports (A Ballad Opera by Peter Bellamy), Free Reed (UK) 2LP, 1977
- Topic Sampler No. 1 – Folk Songs, Topic Records (UK) LP
- Topic Sampler No. 2 – Folk Songs, Topic Records (UK) LP
- Topic Sampler No. 3 – Men at Work, Topic Records (UK) LP
- Topic Sampler No. 6 – A Collection of Ballads & Broadsides, Topic Records (UK) LP
- Topic Sampler No. 7 – Sea Songs & Shanties, Topic Records (UK) LP
- "Doodle let me go (yaller girls)" Performed on soundtrack of The Lighthouse (2019)

=== Recorded and edited by Lloyd ===
- Folk Music of Bulgaria, Topic Records (UK) LP, 1964
- Folk Music of Albania, Topic Records (12T154) (UK) LP, 1966

== Bibliography ==
- García Lorca, Federico (1937) Lament for the Death of a Bullfighter and other poems; translated by A. L. Lloyd. London: Heinemann
- Kafka, Franz (1937) The Metamorphosis; translated by A. L. Lloyd. London: Parton Press; published as Metamorphosis (1946) by Vanguard Press, Inc.
- Fallada, Hans (1952) The Drinker; translated by C. Lloyd and A. L. Lloyd: Melville House, Hoboken, N.J.
- Lloyd, A. L. & Vinogradoff, Igor (1940) Shadow of the Swastika, London: John Lane The Bodley Head
- Lloyd, A. L. (1944) The Singing Englishman: an introduction to folksong. London: Workers' Music Association
- Lloyd, A. L. (compiler) (1945) Corn on the Cob (Popular and Traditional Poetry of the USA) London: Fore Publications
- Lloyd, A. L. (1951) Singing Englishmen: a collection of folk-songs specially prepared for a Festival of Britain concert given in association with the Arts Council of Great Britain
- Lloyd, A. L. (compiler) (1952) Coaldust Ballads (Part-songs by various composers). London: Workers' Music Association
- Lloyd, A. L. (compiler) (1952) Come All Ye Bold Miners (Ballads & Songs of the Coalfield) London: Lawrence & Wishart
- Vaughan Williams, Ralph; Lloyd, A.L., eds. (1959). The Penguin Book of English Folk Songs. Harmondsworth: Penguin Books. ISBN 0-85418-188-1.
- Lloyd, A. L. (1960) The Golden City London: Methuen
- Lloyd, A. L. (1967) Folk Song in England London: Lawrence & Wishart (Paperback edition: Paladin, 1975)

== Films ==
- John Huston, Moby Dick, 1965 (guest appearance)
- Ken Taylor, Ten Thousand Miles: A. L. Lloyd in Australia, 1970
- Gavin Barry, Bert a personal memoir, 1985
