= Topic Records =

- Founded: 1939
- Founder: Workers' Music Association
- Status: Active
- Distributor: Proper Music Distribution - City Hall Records - SRI Canada - Claddagh Records - Planet Distribution - Southbound Records Australasia - Office Sambinha - IRD Spa - Central Distribution
- Genre: Folk music and World music
- Country of origin: United Kingdom
- Location: Uppingham, Rutland
- Official website: Topicrecords.co.uk

Topic Records is a British folk music label, which played a major role in the second British folk revival. It began as an offshoot of the Workers' Music Association in 1939, making it the oldest independent record label in the world.

== History ==
The label began as an offshoot of the communist led Workers' Music Association in 1939, selling Soviet and left-wing political music by mail order. After a period of relative inactivity in the Second World War, production resumed in the later 1940s, moving towards traditional music for the emerging revival market. Up to 1949 the composer Alan Bush was involved with choral and orchestral music released on the label. Topic also produced some of the first American blues records to be commercially available in Britain. From about 1950 the two key figures of the second revival, Ewan MacColl and A. L. Lloyd, became heavily involved, producing several records of traditional music. One of the earliest albums of UK traditional music was Street Songs and Fiddle Tunes of Ireland by Margaret Barry and Michael Gorman, issued in 1958.

With the decline of British Communist Party membership in the late 1950s, financial aid to the label began to dry up and, under director Gerry Sharp, they were forced to pursue an entrepreneurial strategy to survive. In the early 1960s, Topic Records separated from the Workers' Music Association, but those involved still had socialist credentials. A new company was registered in 1963. Financially, the company was in a precarious state until that year, when they had substantial sales from the album The Iron Muse, a ground-breaking thematic programme of industrial folk songs. This success allowed them to produce a greater and wider range of records until tastes began to radically change again in the 1970s.

After the arrival of managing director Tony Engle, Topic released a series of albums by ground breaking artists including Nic Jones, Dick Gaughan, The Battlefield Band, as well as major figures on the folk scene including Martin Carthy and Roy Harris. They also began to reissue their back catalogue on cd. In the late 1990s, with the resurgence of traditional folk, spearheaded by children of the revival like Eliza Carthy, Topic managed to gain both commercial and critical success. In the inaugural BBC Radio 2 Folk Awards in 2000 the label received the Good Tradition Award in recognition of their role in the folk music movement.

Other major figures who recorded for Topic included Peggy Seeger, The Watersons, Shirley Collins, June Tabor and John Tams. The breadth of the Topic catalogue was evident in the release of The Voice of the People (1998), a twenty-part series sampling the earliest and greatest of folk singers of the British Isles.

In 2009, the label celebrated 70 years of activity with the release of a seven-CD hardback book set entitled Three Score & Ten - A Voice To The People.

In 2012, the label began to re-release many of the LPs from its early catalogue in digital form. It accompanied the music with a digital booklet containing all the original artwork and sleeve notes from the original album. These are downloadable free from their website.

Tony Engle went into semi-retirement in 2012, and the day-to-day running of the label was taken over by David Suff. In an interview in early 2017, Suff explained that he would also be entering semi-retirement in February 2017, and that the everyday management of the label would be handed over to Proper Records.

== Anniversaries ==
The label's 70th anniversary was marked by the issue of a boxed set Three Score and Ten, A Voice to the People consisting of a 108-page book and 7 CDs from their back catalogue. Alexis Petridis said in The Guardian, "not bad for a Marxist party offshoot that started in a basement".

The label's 75th anniversary was marked on 23 August 2014 with a special concert at the 50th Towersey Village Festival, near Thame in Oxfordshire. Artists performed songs from the Topic catalogue, and included Norma Waterson, Eliza Carthy & the Gift Band, Lau, Fay Hield, Martin Carthy, Saul Rose, Blair Dunlop, Josienne Clarke and Ben Walker.

== See also ==
- List of record labels
- List of independent UK record labels
