= The Iron Muse =

Vinyl record and CD albums of industrial folk music

Studio album by Anne Briggs, Bob Davenport, Ray Fisher, Louis Killen, A. L. Lloyd, Matt McGinn, The Celebrated Working Man's Band
- Released: March 1963
- Recorded: 17 November 1962
- Genre: Industrial folk
- Length: 48:39
- Label: Topic
- Producer: A. L. Lloyd

The Iron Muse is the title of two albums of industrial folk music released by Topic Records. Subtitled A Panorama of Industrial Folk Music, the first album came out in 1963 as a long-play vinyl record, and the second in 1993 as a CD.

The 1963 album received several favourable reviews at the time, and is referred to in the book accompanying Topic Records' 70th anniversary boxed set, Three Score & Ten, "as one of the most stimulating and satisfying records in the Topic catalogue." (Note: The People's Flag, the sixth CD in the boxed set, features "The Blackleg Miners" and "The Weavers March", which appear in both the vinyl and CD versions of The Iron Muse.)

Later commentary has focused on how the songs were chosen for inclusion in the vinyl album, the extent to which some of them are truly traditional, and the role played by the album in the second British folk revival.

== Vinyl album ==
The Iron Muse, arranged and produced by A. L. Lloyd, is an anthology of industrial folk music. The featured singers and musicians are Anne Briggs, Bob Davenport, Ray Fisher, Louis Killen, A. L. Lloyd, Matt McGinn, and The Celebrated Working Man's Band. (Note: The Celebrated Working Man's Band was an ad hoc group of musicians brought together to record the album. In the words of A. L. Lloyd: "The melodies here are of the kind that the North-eastern miners enjoyed in the pubs at pay week [Miners were paid every two weeks: 'pay week' was the week they received their wages], or at weddings, or on the dusty green of the pit villages of a Sunday evening... latterly, in the pit villages the dances were played by small groups comprising, say, fiddle, concertina (melodeon) or pipe and cello or drum. Our modest band is formed on the model of such humble ensembles.") Recorded in an ad hoc studio at Champion's in Hampstead, London, by Bill Leader and Paul Carter, the album has sleeve notes and a four-page insert containing tune and song details, including lyrics.

Side 1 consists of tunes and songs from coal-mining. Side 2 starts with a weaving tune, continues with songs covering weaving, foundry work and shipbuilding, and ends with a final coal-mining song and a set of coalfield tunes. The album contains the earliest recording of Anne Briggs.

The album was also released by the American record-label Elektra Records in 1964; the tracks are in a different order, and omit The Collier's Daughter.

=== Tracklist ===
Numbers in brackets are track numbers on the CD album. Songs and tunes are traditional except where noted.

Lloyd drew on the Northumbrian Minstrelsy, a collection of 18th and 19th century folk-songs and Northumbrian smallpipe tunes, when selecting the "Miners' Dance Tunes" that open and close the album.

==== Side 1 ====
1. "Miners' Dance Tunes": "Newburn Lads", "The Bonny Pit Laddie", "The Drunken Collier"
2. "The Collier's Rant"
3. "The Recruited Collier"
4. "Pit Boots"
5. "The Banks of the Dee" (22)
6. "The Durham Lockout" – Tommy Armstrong
7. "The Donibristle Moss Moran Disaster"
8. "The Blackleg Miners" (6)
9. "The Celebrated Working Man"
10. "The Row Between The Cages" (23) – Tommy Armstrong
11. "The Collier's Daughter"

The songs on tracks 2, 3, 5, 6, 7, 8, and 10 are included in Lloyd's 1952 compilation of coalfield songs and ballads, Come All Ye Bold Miners.

==== Side 2 ====
1. "The Weavers' March" (11)
2. "The Weaver and the Factory Maid"
3. "The Spinner's Wedding" (12)
4. "The Poor Cotton Wayver" (Note: In the booklet accompanying the vinyl album, A. L. Lloyd states that in Ewan MacColl's 1954 album Shuttle and Cage, "The Poor Cotton Wayver" is set to a different tune that had been published as "The Four Loom Weaver" in MacColl's book The Shuttle and Cage.)
5. "The Doffing Mistress" (14)
6. "The Swan-Necked Valve"
7. "The Dundee Lassie" (17)
8. "The Foreman O'Rourke" – Matt McGinn
9. "Farewell to the Monty" (26) – Johnny Handle
10. "Miners' Dance Tunes": "The Jolly Colliers", "The Keelman over Land", "Sma' Coals an' Little Money"

=== Singers and musicians ===
- Anne Briggs – vocals (side 1: 3 / side 2: 5)
- Bob Davenport – vocals (side 1: 2, 7, 10)
- Ray Fisher – vocals (side 2: 3, 7)
- Louis Killen – vocals (side 1: 5, 8 / side 2: 9), banjo, concertina
- A. L. Lloyd – vocals (side 1: 4, 9 / side 2: 2, 4)
- Matt McGinn – vocals (side 1: 6 / side 2: 6, 8)
- The Celebrated Working Man's Band: Alf Edwards (concertina), Colin Ross (fiddle), Jim Bray (double bass) (side 1: 1, 11 / side 2: 1, 10)

== CD album ==
The Iron Muse

Compilation album by Anne Briggs, Bob Davenport, Ray Fisher, Louis Killen, The Celebrated Working Man's Band, High Level Ranters, Tommy Giffellon, Ewan MacColl, Dick Gaughan, Ed Pickford, Maureen Craik, Dave Brooks, Harry Boardman, Oldham Tinkers
- Released: 1993
- Genre: Industrial folk
- Length: 61:06
- Label: Topic

The CD album has eight tracks from the vinyl version and 18 compiled from other albums of the same period.

=== Tracklist ===
Tracks from the vinyl album are marked *. Songs and tunes are traditional except where noted.

1. "The Sandgate Girl's Lament / Elsie Marley"
2. "Doon the Waggonway"
3. "A Miner's Life"
4. "The Coal-Owner and the Pitman's Wife"
5. "The Trimdon Grange Explosion" – Tommy Armstrong
6. "The Blackleg Miners" *
7. "The Auchengeich Disaster" – Norman Buchan
8. "Ee Aye, Aa Cud Hew"
9. "The Durham Lockout" – Tommy Armstrong
10. "Aa'm Glad the Strike's Done" – Thomas Kerr
11. "The Weaver's March" *
12. "The Spinner's Wedding" *
13. "Oh Dear Me (The Jute Mill Song)"
14. "The Doffing Mistress" *
15. "The Little Piecer" – D. J. Brookes
16. "The Hand-Loom Weaver's Lament"
17. "The Dundee Lassie" *
18. "Success to the Weavers"
19. "Fourpence a Day"
20. "Up the Raw"
21. "Bonny Woodha'"
22. "The Banks of the Dee" *
23. "The Row Between the Cages" * – Tommy Armstrong
24. "Aw Wish Pay Friday Would Come" – James Anderson
25. "Keep Your Feet Still, Geordie Hinny" – Joe Wilson
26. "Farewell to the Monty" * – Johnny Handle

=== Singers and musicians ===
Track numbers are listed after artists' names.

- Anne Briggs – vocals (14)
- Bob Davenport – vocals (23)
- Ray Fisher – vocals (12, 17)
- Louis Killen – vocals (5, 6, 20, 22, 24, 25, 26)
- The Celebrated Working Man's Band: Alf Edwards (concertina), Colin Ross (fiddle), Jim Bray (double bass) (11, 23)
- The High Level Ranters (1, 2, 10)
- Tommy Giffellon (3)
- Ewan MacColl acc. Peggy Seeger – vocals (4, 13, 19)
- Dick Gaughan – vocals (7, 21)
- Ed Pickford – vocals (8)
- Maureen Craik – vocals (9)
- Dave Brooks – vocals (15)
- Harry Boardman – vocals (16)
- The Oldham Tinkers – vocals (18)

=== Source albums ===
- 6, 11, 12, 14, 17, 22, 23, 26: The Iron Muse (1963)
- 5, 24: The Colliers' Rant (1962)
- 20, 25: Northumbrian Garland (1962)
- 4, 19: Shuttle and Cage (1957) and Steam Whistle Ballads (1964)
- 13: Second Shift (1958) and Steam Whistle Ballads (1964)
- 9: Tommy Armstrong of Tyneside (1965)
- 1: Northumberland For Ever (1968)
- 16: Deep Lancashire (1968)
- 15: Owdham Edge (1970)
- 18: Oldham's Burning Sands (1971)
- 8: Canny Newcassell (1972)
- 2, 3, 7, 10, 21: The Bonnie Pit Laddie (1975)

== Reception ==
=== Initial reception ===
Reviewing the 1963 vinyl release, The Gramophone's critic considered the performances to be "outstanding" and the album "the most absorbing folk-song LP of the year." The musicologist Joan Rimmer agreed: "[T]he best English folk recording of 1963." Sing found that "every item is a winner", with the songs "well sung and well played by as brilliant a team as was ever assembled for one record."

=== Analysis and commentary ===
An analysis in 1997 by Michael Brocken, a historian of popular music, of the British folk revival, questions the coherence of the criteria he understands Lloyd to have used in selecting songs for inclusion in The Iron Muse. Interrogating Lloyd's distinction between "folk music" and "popular music", he concludes that "[l]ittle systematic theory comes into view in order to distinguish his musical 'sheep' from 'goats'". Brocken goes on to describe The Iron Muse as "an important record ... seminal to the changing mood of the British folk revival", adding that "the album's regionality and political vagueness struck an appealing chord, firstly amongst the folk clubs and then among the general public, and duly sold in substantial amounts."

In her 2007 study of the second folk revival in Tyneside, Judith Murphy, a musician and cultural historian, states that the release of The Iron Muse, whose reviews were "typically glowing", marked the peak of a "northern vogue" within Britain's folk record industry and a "turning-point in Topic's fiscal fortunes." She adds that this had been pre-figured by the financial success of a series of EPs released by Topic Records in 1962 featuring North-Eastern songs performed by singers later featured on The Iron Muse.

In a 2021 academic paper on the tension between authenticity and creativity in performing traditional folk-songs, the researcher and musician Brian Peters refers to The Iron Muse as an "important LP". He examines the evidence that several of the songs it contains – "The Recruited Collier", "The Weaver and the Factory Maid", "Pit Boots", and "The Blackleg Miners" – had not, in fact, been created by industrial workers, but were of dubious provenance, and in some cases completely concocted.

== See also ==
- British folk revival – Folk music movement
- Industrial folk music – Folk music genre
- Music hall – Type of British theatrical entertainment popular between 1850 and 1960
