= Tribute to the Music of Bob Wills and the Texas Playboys =

Studio album by Asleep at the Wheel
- Released: October 25, 1993
- Recorded: Early – mid-1993
- Studios: Bismeaux (Austin, Texas); Jack's Tracks (Nashville, Tennessee); Austin (Austin, Texas); Tommy Allsup (Nashville, Tennessee); Imagine (Nashville, Tennessee); Emerald (Nashville, Tennessee)
- Genres: Country; Western swing
- Length: 56:10
- Label: Liberty
- Producers: Ray Benson; Allen Reynolds

Asleep at the Wheel chronology
Greatest Hits: Live & Kickin' (1992)	Tribute to the Music of Bob Wills and the Texas Playboys (1993)	The Wheel Keeps on Rollin' (1995)

Singles from Tribute to the Music of Bob Wills and the Texas Playboys
- 1. "Red Wing" Released: September 1993; 2. "Blues for Dixie" Released: April 1994

Tribute to the Music of Bob Wills and the Texas Playboys is the 12th studio album and first tribute album by American country band Asleep at the Wheel. Recorded at studios in Austin, Texas, and Nashville, Tennessee, it was produced by the band's frontman Ray Benson and released on October 25, 1993, by Liberty Records. The collection features recordings of songs made popular by Western swing group Bob Wills and His Texas Playboys, a major influence on Asleep at the Wheel.

Asleep at the Wheel recorded many Wills songs for its previous studio albums starting with its 1973 debut Comin' Right at Ya, but Tribute... marks the first full album dedicated to his music. The release would be followed by two more tributes: Ride with Bob: A Tribute to Bob Wills and the Texas Playboys in 1999 and Still the King: Celebrating the Music of Bob Wills and His Texas Playboys in 2015. The 1993 album is the band's first to feature steel guitarist Cindy Cashdollar and bassist David Miller.

Tribute to the Music of Bob Wills and the Texas Playboys was a critical and commercial success. The album reached number 159 on the US Billboard 200, the band's highest position since Texas Gold in 1975, as well as number 26 on the Top Country Albums chart. Media response was overwhelmingly positive and the album won two Grammy Awards, for Best Country Instrumental Performance (for "Red Wing") and Best Country Performance by a Duo or Group with Vocal ("Blues for Dixie").

== Background ==
Bob Wills and His Texas Playboys were a major influence on the music of Asleep at the Wheel during its formative years. According to frontman Ray Benson, the band was initially "pretty primitive ... playing hippie-country-western-rock", before he heard Merle Haggard's tribute to Wills, A Tribute to the Best Damn Fiddle Player in the World (or, My Salute to Bob Wills), which was released in 1970. Describing the album as "the Rosetta Stone I'd been looking for", Benson added that he was drawn to Wills' Western swing because it "incorporated both jazz solos and blues songs". As a result, almost every album since the group's 1973 debut Comin' Right at Ya has featured at least one recording of a song composed or made popular by Wills, which Benson claimed "the public has always zeroed in on [and] responded very strongly to".

Benson pitched his idea of a Bob Wills tribute album to several record labels with which the band was formerly signed, but was turned down as they did not predict that the project would be commercially successful. It was eventually picked up by Liberty Records. Production of the album took approximately seven months in total. Benson intentionally selected less well-known songs to record for the album, approaching numerous popular country music performers to contribute to each. The band's frontman noted that he "could have done a four-record set" due to the level of interest from other artists, including numerous musicians who did not feature such as Reba McEntire, Leon Redbone and Lee Roy Parnell. A making-of video documenting the record's production was later released by Liberty in promotion of the album's release.

== Reception ==
=== Commercial ===
Tribute to the Music of Bob Wills and the Texas Playboys entered the US Billboard 200 albums chart at number 159 and the Top Country Albums chart at number 36. A few weeks later it peaked at number 35 on the country chart. On the Cash Box magazine Top Country Albums ranking, it peaked at number 21 in December 1993. Outside the US, the album spent four weeks on the Canadian RPM Country Albums chart and peaked at number 17. According to Nielsen SoundScan, Tribute... had sold over 193,000 copies in the US by January 1995.

=== Critical ===
Professional ratings
Review scores
Source	Rating
AllMusic	4.5/5 stars

Media response to Tribute to the Music of Bob Wills and the Texas Playboys was overwhelmingly positive. Writing about the album for The Tennessean, country journalist Robert K. Oermann suggested that the band had "prove[d] that the diversity, flexibility and breadth of Bob's western-swing sound can still astound young listeners," praising the added "star-power" of the featured artists. Similarly, Indianapolis Star columnist John Hawn wrote that "bandleader Ray Benson has outdone himself here by recruiting a diverse group of 18 musicians ... All perform within the framework of Bob Wills-style fiddlin' and yodelin', yet all inject their personalities". Shirley Jinkins of the Casper-Star Tribune called the release "one of the must-haves for any serious music collector", while AllMusic's Michael McCall dubbed it an "exemplary album".

Several writers for Billboard magazine included Tribute... in their end-of-year lists for best album of 1993. Eric Boehlert, Radio Features Editor at the time, ranked it at number 1, reviewing it as "An all-star lineup doing drop-dead gorgeous country swing". New York Correspondent Jim Bessman included it at number 4 on his list, writing that "Ray Benson & Co.'s love affair with Bob Wills and Texas Swing is celebrated merrily." Two other editors for the magazine also included the album in their top fives. The publication's review of lead single "Red Wing" described the song as "a sprightly rendition of the class fiddle tune, adorned considerably by the playing of" its featured performers. Its review of the follow-up "Blues for Dixie" called the track "one of the best moments from one of last year's best albums".

=== Accolades ===
Tribute to the Music of Bob Wills and the Texas Playboys earned Asleep at the Wheel its 12th, 13th and 14th Grammy Award nominations, and its fourth and fifth wins. At the 36th Annual Grammy Awards in 1994, opening track and lead single "Red Wing" won the Grammy Award for Best Country Instrumental Performance, the band's fourth win in the category. At the 37th Annual Grammy Awards the next year, "Blues for Dixie" won the Grammy Award for Best Country Performance by a Duo or Group with Vocal, while the album received a nomination for Best Country Album. The album was nominated for Album of the Year at the 1994 Country Music Association Awards, losing out to another tribute album, Common Thread: The Songs of the Eagles.

== Track listing ==
No.	Title	Writer(s)	Length
1.	"Red Wing" (featuring Eldon Shamblin, Johnny Gimble, Chet Atkins, Vince Gill, Marty Stuart and Lucky Oceans)	Kerry Mills; Thurland Chattaway	3:25
2.	"Big Ball's in Cowtown" (featuring George Strait)	Hoyle Nix	2:40
3.	"Yearning (Just for You)" (featuring Vince Gill)	Benny Carter; Joe Burke	3:20
4.	"Bring It on Down to My House"	Bob Wills	2:50
5.	"Deep Water" (featuring Garth Brooks)	Fred Rose	2:40
6.	"Blues for Dixie" (featuring Lyle Lovett)	Oliver Wendell Mayo	3:07
7.	"Billy Dale" (featuring Dolly Parton)	Billy Jack Wills	3:08
8.	"Across the Alley from the Alamo" (featuring Johnny Rodriguez)	Joe Greene	3:17
9.	"Old Fashioned Love" (featuring Suzy Bogguss)	James P. Johnson; Cecil Mack	3:25
10.	"Ida Red" (featuring Jody Nix, Huey Lewis and Willie Nelson)	Traditional (arr. Bob Wills)	3:04
11.	"Misery" (featuring Marty Stuart)	Tommy Duncan; Tiny Moore; Bob Wills	3:31
12.	"I Wonder If You Feel the Way I Do" (featuring Merle Haggard)	Bob Wills	3:03
13.	"Hubbin' It" (featuring Huey Lewis)	Cindy Walker	2:28
14.	"Corine, Corina" (featuring Brooks & Dunn)	Traditional (arr. Ray Benson, Kix Brooks and Ronnie Dunn)	3:12
15.	"Still Water Runs the Deepest" (featuring Willie Nelson)	Jesse Ashlock	3:27
16.	"All Night Long" (featuring Leon Rausch)	Bob Wills; Johnny Gimble	3:09
17.	"Got a Letter from My Kid Today"	Hy Zaret; Joan Whitney; Alex Kramer	3:21
18.	"Dusty Skies" (featuring Riders in the Sky)	Walker	3:03
Total length:			56:10

== Personnel ==
Asleep at the Wheel
- Ray Benson – guitar, backing and lead vocals (lead on tracks 4, 13 and 17; co-lead on tracks 8–10 and 18), production (all except track 7)
- Cindy Cashdollar – Hawaiian steel guitar
- David Miller – bass, backing vocals
- Tim Alexander – piano, backing vocals
- Tommy Beavers – drums
- Ricky Turpin – fiddle, electric mandolin
- Michael Francis – saxophone

Guest musicians

- Larry Seyer – electric guitar, tic-tac bass, engineering and mixing (all except track 7)
- Clint Strong – electric guitar
- Bucky Meadows – rhythm guitar
- John Ely – steel guitar
- Tommy Morrell – steel guitar
- Herb Remington – Hawaiian steel guitar
- Floyd Domino – piano
- David Sanger – drums
- Larry Franklin – fiddle, backing vocals
- Chris O'Connell – backing vocals
- Dawn Sears – backing vocals
- Vince Gill – electric guitar (track 1), lead vocals (track 3)
- Marty Stuart – electric mandolin (tracks 1 and 11), lead vocals (track 11)
- Jody Nix – backing vocals (track 2), co-lead vocals (track 10)
- Huey Lewis – co-lead vocals (tracks 10 and 13)
- Willie Nelson – co-lead vocals (track 10), lead vocals (track 15)
- Eldon Shamblin – electric guitar (track 1)
- Chet Atkins – nylon guitar (track 1)
- Lucky Oceans – Hawaiian steel guitar (track 1)
- Johnny Gimble – fiddle and electric mandolin (track 1)
- George Strait – lead vocals (track 2)
- Garth Brooks – lead vocals (track 5)
- Chris Leuzinger – electric guitar (track 5)
- Mark Casstevens – acoustic guitar (track 5)
- Bruce Bouton – lap steel guitar (track 5)
- Mike Chapman – bass (track 5)
- Bobby Wood – piano (track 5)
- Milton Sledge – drums (track 5)
- Rob Hajacos – fiddle (track 5)
- Lyle Lovett – lead vocals (track 6)
- Dolly Parton – lead vocals (track 7)
- Johnny Rodriguez – co-lead vocals (track 8)
- Suzy Bogguss – co-lead vocals (track 9)
- Merle Haggard – lead vocals (track 12)
- Brooks & Dunn – lead vocals (track 14)
- Leon Rausch – lead vocals (track 16)
- Riders in the Sky – co-lead vocals (track 18)

Additional personnel

- Allen Reynolds – production (track 7)
- Diane Carr – production assistance
- Rachel Flood – production assistance
- Edi Johnson – production assistance
- Mark Miller – engineering and mixing (track 7)
- Richard Aspinwall – engineering assistance (track 7)
- Roy Kircher – engineering and mixing assistance
- Lou Bradley – additional engineering
- Bob Bullock – mixing (all except track 7)
- Brian Hardin – mixing assistance
- Nick Sparks – mixing assistance
- Stanley Ginsel – digital editing
- Denny Purcell – mastering
- Buddy Jackson – art direction

== Charts ==
Chart (1993)	Peak position
Canadian Country Albums (RPM)	17
US Billboard 200	159
US Top Country Albums (Billboard)	35
