= Red Wing (song) =

1907 song by Kerry Mills and Thurland Chattaway

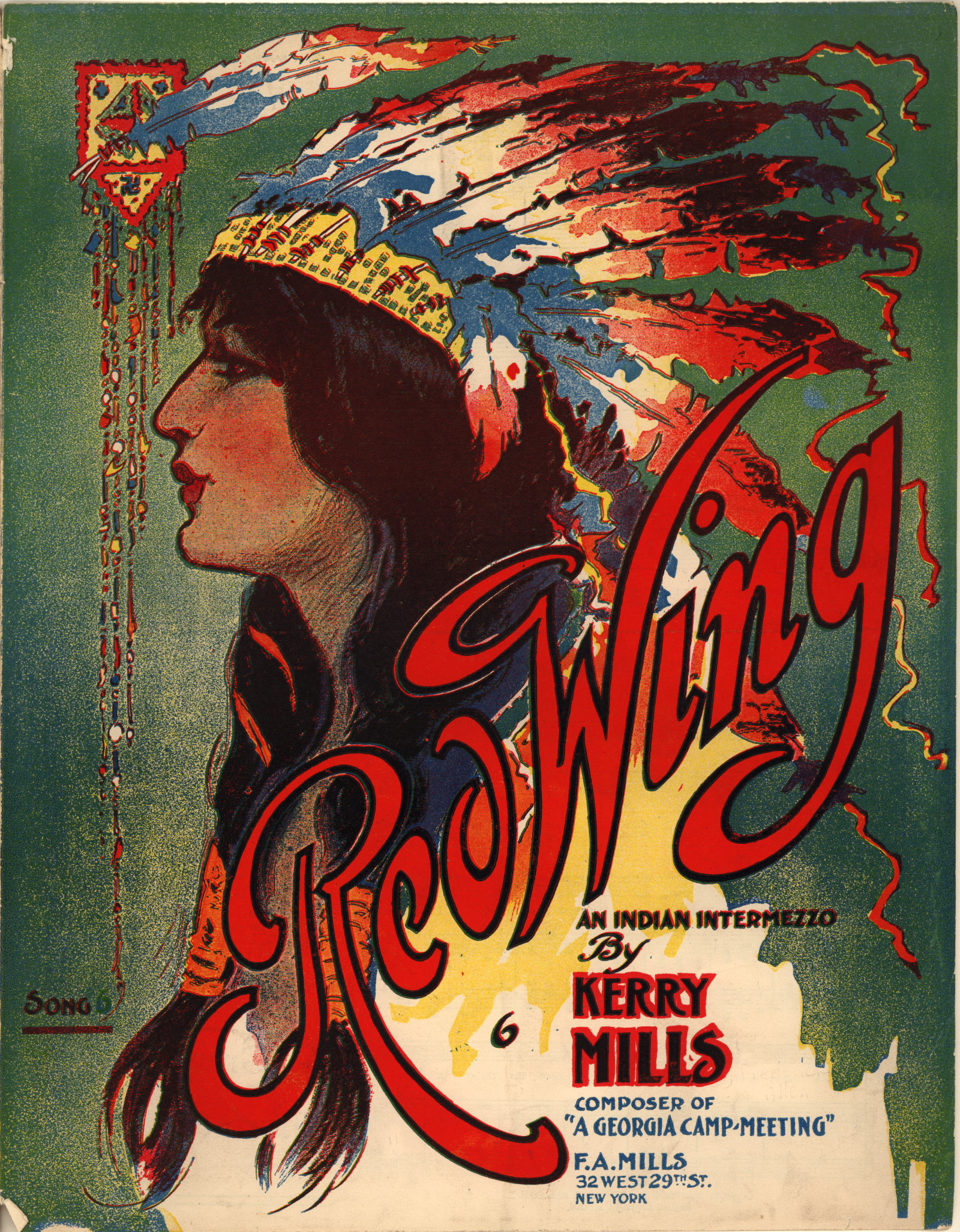
- Sheet music cover (1907)

Song
- Published: 1907
- Genre: Western swing, bluegrass
- Composer: Kerry Mills
- Lyricist: Thurland Chattaway

Red Wing
Red Wing as a bluegrass instrumental, played on a dobro

"Red Wing" is a popular song written in 1907 with music by Kerry Mills and lyrics by Thurland Chattaway. Mills adapted the music of the verse from Robert Schumann's piano composition "The Happy Farmer, Returning From Work" from his 1848 Album for the Young, Opus 68. The song tells of a young Indian girl's loss of her sweetheart who has died in battle.

== Lyrics ==
There once lived an Indian maid,
A shy little prairie maid,
Who sang all day a love song gay,
As on the plains she'd while away the day.
She loved a warrior bold,
This shy little maid of old,
But brave and gay he rode one day
To battle far away.

Now the moon shines tonight on pretty Red Wing,
The breeze is sighing, the night bird's crying,
For afar 'neath his star her brave is sleeping, (Note: in later versions usually: "For a far far away her brave is dying")
While Red Wing's weeping her heart away.

She watched for him day and night;
She lit all the campfires bright;
And under the sky each night, she would lie
And dream about his coming by and by,
But when all the braves returned,
The heart of Red Wing yearned,
For far, far away, her warrior gay
Fell bravely in the fray.

Now the moon shines tonight on pretty Red Wing,
The breeze is sighing, the night bird's crying,
For afar 'neath his star her brave is sleeping,
While Red Wing's weeping her heart away.

== Covers ==
The song has been recorded numerous times in many styles. In 1950 Oscar Brand recorded a bawdy version in his Bawdy Songs & Backroom Ballads, Volume 3.

- The song was connected with and often performed by actress Princess Red Wing. It "achieved a folk song-like popularity" and became a standard for"Native American fiddlers". Its name refers to Red Wing, Minnesota, which is named for Mdewakanton Dakota Chief Red Wing.
- Bob Wills and his Texas Playboys recorded a Western swing cover of Red Wing in the 1940s.
- George Lewis helped make it a standard of the traditional jazz revival era.
- An instrumental version, with Chet Atkins on guitar, was released by Asleep at the Wheel in 1993.
- American roots music group The Steel Wheels recorded a version with new lyrics in 2011.
- Slim Whitman, country music singer

== In popular culture ==
The chorus of this song is played by ice cream trucks in North America.

The music has been played during intermissions at Olympia Stadium, Joe Louis Arena, and Little Caesars Arena ever since the Detroit Falcons became the Detroit Red Wings.

A few seconds of the song were sung by John Wayne in the 1943 film In Old Oklahoma and again by John Wayne and Lee Marvin in the 1961 film The Comancheros.

The song's tune is sampled at the end of "Where You'll Find Me Now" by indie rock band Neutral Milk Hotel.

== "Union Maid" by Woody Guthrie ==
In 1940 Woody Guthrie wrote new lyrics to the tune, retitled "Union Maid". Guthrie's are perhaps the most famous of alternative words for the song; his song begins:

There once was a union maid, she never was afraid
Of goons and ginks and company finks and the deputy sheriffs who made the raid.
She went to the union hall when a meeting it was called,
And when the Legion boys come 'round
She always stood her ground.

Oh, you can't scare me, I'm sticking to the union,
I'm sticking to the union, I'm sticking to the union.
Oh, you can't scare me, I'm sticking to the union,
I'm sticking to the union 'til the day I die.

== The Moon Shines Bright on Charlie Chaplin ==
Red Wing was parodied in a version popular among British troops during the First World War, which begins with the line, "Now the moon shines bright on Charlie Chaplin." This variant originated in response to the comedian's refusal to enlist, and was featured in the movie Oh! What A Lovely War. It was subsequently perpetuated among British schoolchildren. During the 1970s, Harry Boardman and the Oldham Tinkers folk group recorded a version incorporating all of the verses that they remembered from their childhood.

=== First World War ===
The following version was published in 1916 by B. Feldman.

You've sung of the boys in blue,
You've sung of their girls so true,
You've marched to the strain of the well-known refrain
Of "Who's Your Lady Friend?" and "Tipperary" too,
Our Tommies so brave and strong
Have sung ev'ry kind of song
But what is the lay they're singing today
As they go marching along?

Refrain
When the moon shines bright on Charlie Chaplin
His shoes are cracking, for want of blacking
And his little baggy trousers they want mending
Before we send him to the Dardanelles.

Some day there will come a time
To "Wind up the Watch on the Rhine",
And Tommy and Jack will come marching back
And take a cup for the sake of "Auld Lang Syne".
But ere that happy day
The Germans have got to pay,
When we march in to capture Berlin
We will sing this little lay.

Refrain

A variant of the refrain goes

When the moon shines bright on Charlie Chaplin
His boots are cracking, for want of blacking
And the bottoms of his shoes, they won't need mending
Before they send him to the Dardanelles.

Another variant (some years later, and without the war reference) goes

Oh, the moon shines bright on Charlie Chaplin
His boots are cracking, they need a blacking
And his old gray trousers need a patching
Cause he's been scratching
Mosquito bites!

=== Oldham Tinkers ===
Refrain
The moon shines bright on Charlie Chaplin
His boots are crackin’ for want of blackin‘
And his owd fusty coat is wanting mending
Until they send him to the Dardenelles

Charlie Chaplin had no sense
He bought a flute for 18 pence
But the only tune that he could play
Was ta-ra-ra-boom-de-ay

Refrain

Charlie Chaplin meek and mild
Stole a sausage from a child
But when the child began to cry
Charlie socked him in the eye

Refrain

Charlie Chaplin went to France
To teach the ladies how to dance
First you heel, and then you toe
Lift your skirts and up you go

Refrain

Charlie Chaplin Chuck-Chuck-Chuck
Went to bed with three white ducks
One died and Charlie cried
Charlie Chaplin Chuck-Chuck-Chuck

Refrain
