= Colin Ross (pipemaker) =

English folk musician (1934–2019)

Colin Ross (13 January 1934 – 27 May 2019) was an English folk musician who played fiddle and Northumbrian smallpipes. He was a noted maker of Northumbrian smallpipes, border pipes and Scottish smallpipes, and one of the inventors of the modern Scottish smallpipes.

Ross played both Northumbrian smallpipes and fiddle in the English folk music band the High Level Ranters, which was formed in 1964 and specialised in the music of Northumberland and the Scottish Borders, playing a major role in the revival of Northumbrian music from the 1960s. In 1977, each of the Ranters was given the chance to produce a solo album; rather than do this alone, Ross collaborated with various other musicians to produce Cut and Dry Dolly, an album of early Northumbrian music, simple dance tunes from the late 18th century William Vickers manuscript together with long variation sets, particularly from the Peacock tunebook from the beginning of the 19th century. This was very influential in reviving interest in this early strand of Northumbrian music.

== Early life and music ==
Ross was born in 1934 in Donkin Terace, North Shields, and was brought up there by his parents John Ross and Agnes Charlton, learning to play the violin as a teenager. He took a sculpture degree at Kings College Durham (now Newcastle University) from 1952–56. At this time he met the Kingsmen Rapper side (becoming their musician after trying the dance) as well as the Northumbrian pipers Forster Charlton and Colin Caisley, falling in love with the Northumbrian smallpipes.

In 1958 he was a founder member of the Bridge Folk Club, Newcastle, originally called Newcastle Folksong and Ballad, and there met his future wife, folk singer Ray Fisher. In the same year he got his first set of pipes from Willie Hamilton in Glasgow via Forster Charlton. He made his first set of pipes in 1961 while he was a lecturer at Newcastle Polytechnic (now Northumbria University), copying his own set. He won several pipemaking competitions through the 1960s, and was elected vice-chairman of the Northumbrian Pipers' Society in 1964.

== Pipemaking ==
In the late 1970s, he was the Curator of the Black Gate Museum, Newcastle, which then housed the Cocks collection of historic bagpipes. In the early 1980s, several pipemakers, including Ross, Hamish Moore and others were working to create sets of smallpipes which had similar reeds and cylindrical bore to the Northumbrian smallpipes, but with an open end to the chanter, and with the scale and 'covered' fingering of a Great Highland bagpipe. The result was an instrument which allowed Great Highland pipers to play pipes with fingering identical to the Great Pipes, but at a volume which would not overpower other instruments, and in keys (typically A or D) more compatible with other instruments, such as the fiddle. Colin Ross sold such an instrument, in D, in Edinburgh in 1982. These instruments are now referred to as Scottish smallpipes; they are similar to, though having significant differences from, surviving historical examples. In particular, the modern instruments are larger, and hence lower pitched.

He had become a full-time pipemaker from 1978, and also taught a pipemaking class at Killingworth from about this time. One major achievement of his as a pipemaker was to standardise hole spacings and reeds, so that his pipes are reliably in tune with one another. When he started piping, it had been notoriously hard for pipers to play together; hole spacings and reeds were not standardised, so different instruments might commonly have pitches differing by up to a semitone. Now there is a de facto pitch standard, and ensemble playing is common.

== Leadership and awards ==
Ross served as the Chairman of the Northumbrian Pipers' Society from 1968 to 1980, and again from 1992, stepping down in 2010. During both tenures, the Society published a substantial body of music, notably in 1970 a new expanded edition of the Society's first tunebook, and in 1980 the facsimile edition of Peacock's tunebook, an important historical source. More recently in 1997 he co-edited with Julia Say, a book of the tunes of Billy Pigg, researched by Adrian Schofield.

In 2008 he was awarded the Gold Badge of the English Folk Dance and Song Society. This is awarded to 'Those who have made unique or outstanding contributions to the art or science of folk dance, music or song; or those who have rendered distinguished service to the aims of the Society through their exceptional contribution.' It is the highest award the Society confers.

In May 2010, the Northumbrian Pipers' Society celebrated his long and distinguished contribution to piping and to the Society with a concert in his honour at the King's Hall, Newcastle University. Fittingly, most of the performers were playing pipes made by Colin Ross himself.

== Death ==
Ross died on 27 May 2019.

== Published works ==
- Reedmaking for Northumbrian and Scottish Smallpipes published by B & J Say Smallpipes ISBN 0-9542402-0-0

== Discography ==
- No Roses, Albion Country Band, Pegasus, 1971.
- The Bonnie Pit Laddie (with the High Level Ranters), TSCD486.
- Northumberland Forever – Traditional Dance & Song From The North East (with the High Level Ranters)
- The Wind in the Reeds, TSCD529 (1976, 1980, Topic, 2001).
- Along the Coaly Tyne, TSCD498.
- Cut and Dry Dolly, Topic 12TS278, 1977.
- Cut and Dry 2, Topic 12TS413, 1981.
- Spirit of the Border: Northumbrian Traditional Music Nimbus NI5615, 1999.
- Northumberland Rant: Traditional Music From England. Smithsonian Folkways Recordings SFW 40473, 1999.
