= The High Level Ranters =

- Origin: Newcastle upon Tyne, Northumberland
- Genres: English folk music, Celtic music
- Years active: 1964–present
- Labels: Topic Records, Trailer Records, Broadside Records
- Members: Jim Hall; Johnny Handle
- Past members: Alistair Anderson; Tommy Gilfellon; Forster Charlton; John Doonan; Pete Wood; Lou Killen; Colin Ross
- Website: highlevelranters.co.uk

The High Level Ranters are a Northumbrian traditional musical group founded in 1964, best known for being one of the first bands in the revival of the Northumbrian smallpipes.

== Name and history ==
The name was chosen as a combination of the location of the Bridge Folk Club at the north end of the High Level Bridge in Newcastle upon Tyne, where they all played, and from the Cheviot Ranters, a famous Northumberland dance band operating in the Alnwick area from about 1953 to 1996.

The High Level Ranters have been playing traditional music and song from North East England for nearly 40 years, becoming one of the most influential groups of the British folk revival. For many years they were the only group featuring the Northumbrian smallpipes in their performances, and are thus responsible for introducing many of today's pipers to this unique instrument. They have also introduced many of today's musicians to the distinctive traditional music in the North East, and have done so with a unique enthusiasm of performance. Performers such as The High Level Ranters brought Northumbrian folk to national and international audiences.

The band were featured twice, live in session, by BBC Radio 1's John Peel - first on 18 October 1972, recorded at the Playhouse Theatre, Northumberland Avenue in London and later, on 3 July 1974, recorded at the BBC Newcastle studio. The band continues to tour and may be booked through their official website.

== Band members ==
Between 1969 and 1979 the band consisted of Alistair Anderson, Tommy Gilfellon, Johnny Handle and Colin Ross. Since 1980 the line-up has been Jim Hall, Johnny Handle and Colin Ross.

At various times and for various recordings Forster Charlton, John Doonan, Pete Wood and Lou Killen have also been band members.

== Discography ==
=== High Level Ranters (1966-1979) ===
- Northumberland for Ever, 1968 (Topic 12TS186)
- The Lads of Northumbria, 1969 (Trailer LER 2007)
- Keep Your Feet Still Geordie Hinnie, 1970 (Trailer LER 2020)
- High Level, 1971 (Trailer LER 2030)
- A Mile to Ride, 1973 (Trailer LER 2037)
- The Bonny Pit Laddie, 1975 (Topic 2-12TS271/2) (With Harry Boardman and Dick Gaughan)
- Ranting Lads, 1976 (Topic 12TS297)
- English Sporting Ballads, 1976 (Broadside BRO 128) (with Martyn Wyndham-Read)
- Four in a Bar, 1979 (Topic 12TS388)

=== "New" High Level Ranters (1980-2004) ===
- The New High Level Ranters, 1982 (Topic 12TS425)
- Border Spirit, 1983 (Topic 12TS434)
- Gateshead Revisited, 1987 (Common Ground CGR 005)

=== Compilation albums with tracks from the High Level Ranters ===
- The Iron Muse, 1993 CD Compilation (Topic TSCD465)
- Three Score and Ten, 2009 Topic Records 70 year anniversary boxed set includes Aa’m Glad The Strike’s Done from The Bonny Pit Laddie as track sixteen on the sixth CD.
