= List of awards and nominations received by Brooks & Dunn =

Brooks & Dunn awards and nominations
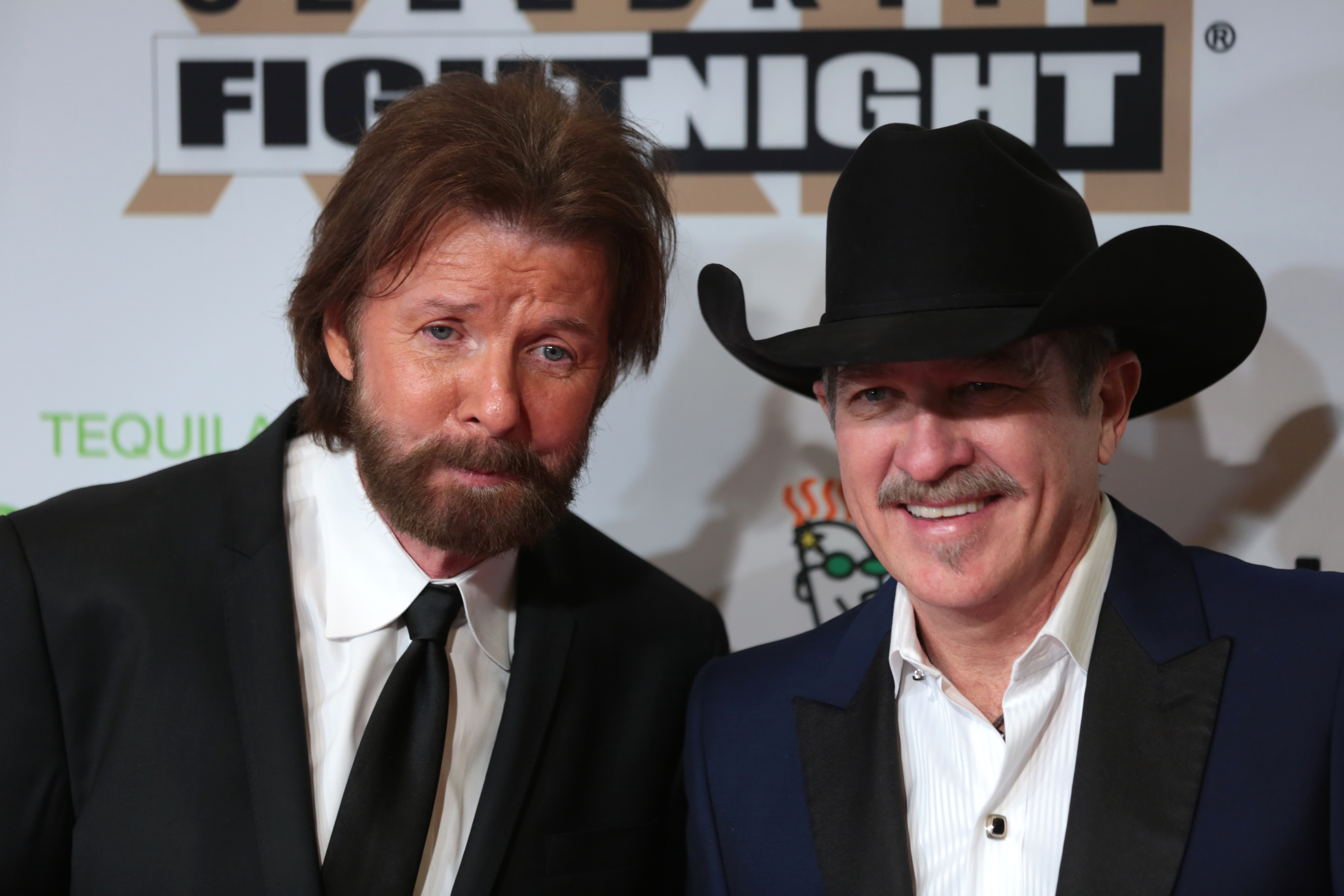
- Brooks & Dunn in March 2017
Awards and nominations
Award	Wins	Nominations
American Music Awards	5	20
CMT	1	8
Grammy	2	16
Academy of Country Music Awards	30	73
Country Music Association Awards	19	56

Totals (Note: Certain award groups do not simply award one winner. They acknowledge several different recipients, have runners-up, and have third place. Since this is a specific recognition and is different from losing an award, runner-up mentions are considered wins in this award tally. For simplification and to avoid errors, each award in this list has been presumed to have had a prior nomination.)
- Wins: 56
- Nominations: 172

Brooks & Dunn is an American country music duo consisting of Kix Brooks and Ronnie Dunn. Active from 1991 to 2011, the duo recorded ten albums for Arista Nashville. Brooks & Dunn won Vocal Duo of the Year from the Country Music Association every year from 1992 to 2006, except in 2000 (in which the honor went to Montgomery Gentry). They won the Academy of Country Music's Top Vocal Duo (previously known as the Vocal Duo of the Year Award) consecutively from 1991-1997, 2000-2007, and once more in 2009. They have also won two Grammy Awards, both for Grammy Award for Best Country Performance by a Duo or Group with Vocal. With over 50 awards, Brooks and Dunn are one of the most accredited country acts in history.

== Academy of Country Music Awards ==
The Academy of Country Music Awards are annual awards honoring the best in country music. Brooks & Dunn has won 30 awards from 73 nominations.

Year	Nominee/Work	Award	Result
1991	Themselves	Vocal Duo of the Year	Won
1991	Themselves	Top New Vocal Duo or Group of the Year	Won
1992	Themselves	Vocal Duo of the Year	Won
1992	Brand New Man	Album of the Year	Won
1992	"Boot Scootin’ Boogie"	Single Record of the Year	Won
1992	"Boot Scootin’ Boogie"	Song of the Year	Nominated
1993	Themselves	Vocal Duo of the Year	Won
1993	Hard Workin' Man	Album of the Year	Nominated
1993	Common Thread: The Songs of the Eagles (with various artists)	Album of the Year	Nominated
1994	Themselves	Top Vocal Duo	Won
1994	Themselves	Entertainer of the Year	Nominated
1995	Themselves	Entertainer of the Year	Won
1995	Themselves	Top Vocal Duo	Won
1995	"You're Gonna Miss Me When I'm Gone"	Song of the Year	Nominated
1995	Waitin' on Sundown	Album of the Year	Nominated
1995	You're Gonna Miss Me When I'm Gone	Single Record of the Year	Nominated
1996	Themselves	Entertainer of the Year	Won
1996	Themselves	Top Vocal Duo	Won
1996	"My Maria"	Song of the Year	Nominated
1996	Borderline	Album of the Year	Nominated
1996	My Maria	Single Record of the Year	Nominated
1996	"My Maria"	Video of the Year	Nominated
1997	Themselves	Vocal Duo or Group of the Year	Won
1997	Themselves	Entertainer of the Year	Nominated
1998	Themselves	Entertainer of the Year	Nominated
1998	Themselves	Top Vocal Duo or Group	Nominated
1998	"Husbands and Wives"	Song of the Year	Nominated
1998	"If You See Him/If You See Her" (with Reba McEntire)	Vocal Event of the Year	Nominated
1999	Themselves	Top Vocal Duo or Group	Nominated
2000	Themselves	Top Vocal Duo	Won
2000	Themselves	Entertainer of the Year	Nominated
2001	Themselves	Entertainer of the Year	Won
2001	"Only in America"	Video of the Year	Won
2001	Themselves	Top Vocal Duo	Won
2001	Steers & Stripes	Album of the Year	Nominated
2001	Ain't Nothing 'Bout You	Single Record of the Year	Nominated
2001	"Only in America"	Song of the Year	Nominated
2001	Themselves	Home Depot Humanitarian Award	Nominated
2002	Themselves	Top Vocal Duo	Won
2002	Themselves	Entertainer of the Year	Nominated
2002	Themselves	Home Depot Humanitarian Award	Nominated
2003	Themselves	Top Vocal Duo	Won
2003	Themselves	Entertainer of the Year	Nominated
2003	Red Dirt Road	Single Record of the Year	Nominated
2003	"Red Dirt Road"	Song of the Year	Nominated
2003	Red Dirt Road	Album of the Year	Nominated
2004	Themselves	Top Vocal Duo	Won
2004	Themselves	Entertainer of the Year	Nominated
2005	Themselves	Top Vocal Duo	Won
2005	"Believe"	Song of the Year	Won
2005	Themselves	Entertainer of the Year	Nominated
2005	Believe	Single Record of the Year	Nominated
2005	"Believe"	Video of the Year	Nominated
2005	Themselves	Triple Crown Award	Won
2006	Themselves	Top Vocal Duo	Won
2006	Themselves	Home Depot Humanitarian Award	Won
2006	"Building Bridges" (with Vince Gill and Sheryl Crow)	Vocal Event of the Year	Won
2006	Themselves	Entertainer of the Year	Nominated
2006	Hillbilly Deluxe	Album of the Year	Nominated
2006	"Hillbilly Deluxe"	Video of the Year	Nominated
2007	Themselves	Top Vocal Duo	Won
2008	Themselves	Top Vocal Duo	Nominated
2008	"Cowgirls Don't Cry" (with Reba McEntire)	Vocal Event of the Year	Nominated
2009	Themselves	Top Vocal Duo	Won
2009	"Honky Tonk Stomp" (with Billy Gibbons)	Vocal Event of the Year	Nominated
2014	Themselves	50th Anniversary Milestone Award	Won
2016	"Forever Country" (with Artists of Then, Now & Forever)	Video of the Year	Won
2018	Themselves	Cliffie Stone Icon Award	Won
2019	Themselves	Duo of the Year	Nominated
2020	Themselves	Duo of the Year	Nominated
2021	Themselves	Duo of the Year	Nominated
2022	Themselves	Duo of the Year	Nominated
2023	Themselves	Duo of the Year	Nominated
2024	Themselves	Duo of the Year	Nominated
2025	Themselves	Duo of the Year	Won
2026	Themselves	Duo of the Year	Won

== American Country Awards ==
The American Country Awards ran from 2010-2013, the awards show was fan-voted. Brooks & Dunn was nominated once.

Year	Nominee/Work	Award	Result
2010	Themselves	Touring Headline Package of the Year	Nominated

== American Country Countdown Awards ==
The American Country Countdown Awards are annual awards honoring country artists. Brooks & Dunn were honored with the Nash Icon Award recognizing their body of work and contribution to country music.

Year	Nominee/Work	Award	Result
2016	Themselves	Nash Icon Award	Won

== American Music Awards ==
The American Music Awards is an annual American music awards show, winners are voted upon by the general public. Brooks & Dunn has received twenty nominations, resulting in five awards.

Year	Nominee/Work	Award	Result
1993	Themselves	Favorite Country Band, Duo, or Group	Nominated
1993	Themselves	Favorite Country New Artist	Nominated
1994	Themselves	Favorite Country Band, Duo, or Group	Nominated
1994	Hard Workin' Man	Favorite Country Album	Nominated
1995	Themselves	Favorite Country Band, Duo, or Group	Nominated
1996	Themselves	Favorite Country Band, Duo, or Group	Nominated
1996	Waitin' on Sundown	Favorite Country Album	Nominated
1997	Themselves	Favorite Country Band, Duo, or Group	Won
1998	Themselves	Favorite Country Band, Duo, or Group	Nominated
1999	Themselves	Favorite Country Band, Duo, or Group	Nominated
2000	Themselves	Favorite Country Band, Duo, or Group	Won
2001	Themselves	Favorite Country Band, Duo, or Group	Nominated
2002	Themselves	Favorite Country Band, Duo, or Group	Won
2002	Steers & Stripes	Favorite Country Album	Nominated
2003	Themselves	Favorite Country Band, Duo, or Group	Nominated
2004	Themselves	Favorite Country Band, Duo, or Group	Won
2005	Themselves	Favorite Country Band, Duo, or Group	Won
2006	Themselves	Favorite Country Band, Duo, or Group	Nominated
2007	Themselves	Favorite Country Band, Duo, or Group	Nominated
2008	Themselves	Favorite Country Band, Duo, or Group	Nominated

== Billboard Music Awards ==
The Billboard Music Awards are annual awards based on album and digital songs sales, streaming, radio airplay, touring and social engagement. Brooks & Dunn has won three awards out of four nominations.

Year	Nominee/Work	Award	Result
1996	"My Maria"	Country Single of the Year	Won
2001	"Ain't Nothing 'Bout You"	Country Single of the Year	Won
2005	Themselves	Duo/Group Country Artist of the Year	Won
2006	Themselves	Duo/Group Country Artist of the Year	Nominated

== Blockbuster Entertainment Awards ==
The Blockbuster Entertainment Awards was an annual awards show held from 1995-2001. Brooks & Dunn received two nominations, winning once.

Year	Nominee/Work	Award	Result
1998	Greatest Hits Collection	Favorite Duo/Group - Country	Won
2000	Greatest Hits Collection	Favorite Duo/Group - Country	Nominated

== BMI Awards ==
The BMI Awards are annual awards honoring the best in songwriting in different genres. Brooks & Dunn received one award.

Year	Nominee/Work	Award	Result
2009	"Cowgirls Don't Cry" (with Reba McEntire)	President's Awards	Won

== CMT Flameworthy Video Music Awards ==
From 2002-2004 CMT held an annual awards show to showcase the best country music videos. Brooks & Dunn won one award.

Year	Nominee/Work	Award	Result
2002	"Only in America"	Group or Duo Video of the Year	Won

== CMT Music Awards ==
The CMT Music Awards is a fan-voted awards show for country music videos and television performances. Brooks & Dunn have one award from eight nominations.

Year	Nominee/Work	Award	Result
2006	"Believe"	Music Video of the Year	Nominated
2006	"Believe"	Group or Duo Video of the Year	Nominated
2006	"Believe"	Most Inspiring Video of the Year	Nominated
2007	"Building Bridges"	Duo Video of the Year	Nominated
2008	"Proud of the House We Built"	Duo Video of the Year	Nominated
2009	"Put a Girl in It"	Duo Video of the Year	Nominated
2009	"Cowgirls Don't Cry" (with Reba McEntire)	Collaborative Video of the Year	Nominated
2010	"Indian Summer"	Duo Video of the Year	Won

== Country Music Association Awards ==
The Country Music Association Awards are presented to country music artists and broadcasters to recognize outstanding achievement in the country music industry. Brooks & Dunn have won 21 awards from 56 nominations.

Year	Nominee/Work	Award	Result
1992	Themselves	Vocal Duo of the Year	Won
1992	Themselves	Horizon Award	Nominated
1992	Brand New Man	Album of the Year	Nominated
1993	Themselves	Vocal Duo of the Year	Won
1993	Themselves	Entertainer of the Year	Nominated
1993	Hard Workin' Man	Album of the Year	Nominated
1994	Themselves	Vocal Duo of the Year	Won
1994	Common Thread: The Songs of the Eagles (with various artists)	Album of the Year	Won
1994	Asleep at the Wheel: Tribute to the Music of Bob Wills and the Texas Playboys (with various artists)	Album of the Year	Nominated
1994	Themselves	Entertainer of the Year	Nominated
1995	Themselves	Vocal Duo of the Year	Won
1995	Themselves	Entertainer of the Year	Nominated
1996	Themselves	Entertainer of the Year	Won
1996	Themselves	Vocal Duo of the Year	Won
1996	Borderline	Album of the Year	Nominated
1996	"My Maria"	Music Video of the Year	Nominated
1996	"My Maria"	Single of the Year	Nominated
1997	Themselves	Vocal Duo of the Year	Won
1997	Themselves	Entertainer of the Year	Nominated
1998	Themselves	Vocal Duo of the Year	Won
1998	Themselves	Entertainer of the Year	Nominated
1998	"If You See Him/If You See Her" (with Reba McEntire)	Vocal Event of the Year	Nominated
1999	Themselves	Vocal Duo of the Year	Won
2000	Themselves	Vocal Duo of the Year	Nominated
2001	Themselves	Vocal Duo of the Year	Won
2001	Themselves	Entertainer of the Year	Nominated
2001	Steers and Stripes	Album of the Year	Nominated
2001	"Ain't Nothin' 'Bout You"	Single of the Year	Nominated
2002	Themselves	Vocal Duo of the Year	Won
2002	Themselves	Entertainer of the Year	Nominated
2003	Themselves	Vocal Duo of the Year	Won
2003	Themselves	Entertainer of the Year	Nominated
2003	"Red Dirt Road"	Music Video of the Year	Nominated
2004	Themselves	Vocal Duo of the Year	Won
2004	Themselves	Entertainer of the Year	Nominated
2004	Red Dirt Road	Album of the Year	Nominated
2005	Themselves	Vocal Duo of the Year	Won
2006	"Believe"	Single of the Year	Won
2006	"Believe"	Music Video of the Year	Won
2006	Themselves	Vocal Duo of the Year	Won
2006	Themselves	Entertainer of the Year	Nominated
2006	Hillbilly Deluxe	Album of the Year	Nominated
2006	"Building Bridges" (with Sheryl Crow and Vince Gill)	Musical Event of the Year	Nominated
2007	Themselves	Vocal Duo of the Year	Nominated
2008	Themselves	Vocal Duo of the Year	Nominated
2008	Cowboy Town	Album of the Year	Nominated
2009	Themselves	Vocal Duo of the Year	Nominated
2009	"Cowgirls Don't Cry" (with Reba McEntire)	Musical Event of the Year	Nominated
2010	Themselves	Vocal Duo of the Year	Nominated
2019	"Brand New Man" (with Luke Combs)	Musical Event of the Year	Nominated
2019	Themselves	Vocal Duo of the Year	Nominated
2020	Themselves	Vocal Duo of the Year	Nominated
2021	Themselves	Vocal Duo of the Year	Nominated
2022	Themselves	Vocal Duo of the Year	Nominated
2023	Themselves	Vocal Duo of the Year	Nominated
2024	Themselves	Vocal Duo of the Year	Won
2025	Themselves	Vocal Duo of the Year	Won
2026	Themselves	Vocal Duo of the Year	Pending
2026	Themselves	Willie Nelson Lifetime Achievement Award	Won

== Grammy Awards ==
The Grammys are presented annually by the National Academy of Recording Arts and Sciences of the United States for outstanding achievements in the music industry. Brooks & Dunn has been honored with two wins and sixteen nominations.

Year	Nominee/Work	Award	Result
1992	"Boot Scootin' Boogie"	Best Country Vocal Performance by a Duo or Group	Nominated
1993	"Hard Workin’ Man"	Best Country Performance by a Duo or Group with Vocals	Won
1995	"You're Gonna Miss Me When I'm Gone"	Best Country Vocal Performance by a Duo or Group	Nominated
1996	"My Maria"	Best Country Vocal Performance by a Duo or Group	Won
1996	Borderline	Best Country Album	Nominated
1998	"If You See Him/If You See Her" (with Reba McEntire)	Best Country Collaboration with Vocals	Nominated
2000	"You'll Always Be Loved By Me"	Best Country Vocal Performance by a Duo or Group	Nominated
2001	"Ain't Nothing 'Bout You"	Best Country Vocal Performance by a Duo or Group	Nominated
2003	"Red Dirt Road"	Best Country Vocal Performance by a Duo or Group	Nominated
2004	"You Can't Take The Honky Tonk Out Of The Girl"	Best Country Vocal Performance by a Duo or Group	Nominated
2005	"Play Something Country"	Best Country Vocal Performance by a Duo or Group	Nominated
2005	"Building Bridges" (with Sheryl Crow & Vince Gill)	Best Country Collaboration with Vocals	Nominated
2007	"Proud Of The House We Built"	Best Country Vocal Performance by a Duo or Group	Nominated
2008	"God Must Be Busy"	Best Country Vocal Performance by a Duo or Group	Nominated
2009	"Cowgirls Don't Cry"	Best Country Vocal Performance by a Duo or Group	Nominated
2016	"Brand New Man" (with Luke Combs)	Best Country Duo/Group Performance	Nominated

== Inspirational Country Music Awards ==
The Inspirational Country Music Association hold annual awards to honor artists who participate or promote the genre of Christian country music. Brooks & Dunn won two awards from four nominations.

Year	Nominee/Work	Award	Result
2006	"Believe"	Song of the Year	Won
2006	"Believe"	Video of the Year	Won
2008	Themselves	Mainstream Country Artist of the Year	Nominated
2008	"God Must Be Busy"	Video of the Year	Nominated

== People's Choice Awards ==
The People's Choice Awards are annual awards recognizing the people and the work of popular culture, voted on by the general public. Brooks & Dunn received one award.

Year	Nominee/Work	Award	Result
2005	Themselves	Favorite Country Group	Won

== Radio Music Awards ==
The Radio Music Awards was an annual American awards show that honored the year's most successful songs on mainstream radio. Brooks & Dunn were nominated once.

Year	Nominee/Work	Award	Result
2005	Themselves	Artist of the Year: Country Radio	Nominated

== TNN/Music City News Awards ==
The Nashville Network and the Music City News held an annual awards show from 1990 to 1999, winners were voted upon by general public. Brooks & Dunn won Vocal Duo of the Year seven times.

Year	Nominee/Work	Award	Result
1993	Themselves	Vocal Duo of the Year	Won
1994	Themselves	Vocal Duo of the Year	Won
1995	Themselves	Vocal Group or Duo of the Year	Won
1996	Themselves	Vocal Duo of the Year	Won
1997	Themselves	Vocal Duo of the Year	Won
1998	Themselves	Vocal Group or Duo of the Year	Won
1999	Themselves	Vocal Group or Duo of the Year	Won

== Other honors ==
- 2008 Hollywood Walk of Fame, Inducted
- 2019 Country Music Hall of Fame, Inducted
