= Tommy Breckons =

Tommy Breckons (1928–2009) lived all his life on his family's Foundry Farm, Bellingham, central Northumberland. He was a noted player of the Northumbrian smallpipes.

== Learning ==
Tommy learned at first from G.G. Armstrong, and subsequently taking further lessons for two years from Tom Clough after Armstrong gave up teaching through ill-health. He also learned the Highland pipes - it is rare to master both instruments, with their very different fingering and sound. He was perhaps the last piper to have known the playing of the Cloughs directly. He described Tom Clough's set of exercises, which he said were similar to G.G. Armstrong's. They consisted of scales and arpeggios - the pupil would have to start slowly, and increase speed till mistakes happened. Another group of exercises, based on variation sets, are all found in the four tunes Fenwick of Bywell, Jacky Layton, Felton Lonnen and Oh dear, what can the matter be. He also gave a description of Tom Clough's meticulous teaching technique: He made you break a tune down and play it bar by bar. If there was a bar bothering you, you played that bar until you got it right. Then you put the bars together, then put the measure together, and then eventually the tune together. Finally you could start at the beginning and go through it.

== Recollections of other pipers ==
Tommy was also a friend of Billy Pigg, first hearing him at a concert in Bellingham in 1948–9, and getting to know him well from about 1962. He felt that There were two really outstanding pipers that I've known, ... Billy Pigg and Tom Clough. He regretted that while Tom Clough was recorded at the peak of his ability, Billy Pigg was only recorded on poor equipment when his health was failing It's a great pity he wasn't recorded at his peak. Tommy reported Billy Pigg's account of how he had learned from sessions at Tom Clough's. When he lived at Blagdon, he used to bike down to Clough's. There were fourteen or fifteen pipers all living in that area, and they took turns to play at each other's houses, including Billy's. Billy told me that when he first went to one of these sessions there were fourteen pipers in the house, ..., and everyone was better than me! By God..., there were some good pipers. But all I had to dee was practice and get up alongside them. Billy Pigg's reel Tom of Bellingham is believed to be named after Tommy.

== Playing technique and style ==
Significantly, Tommy related that both Tom Clough and Billy Pigg played covering the holes with the pads, rather than the ends, of their fingers. He advocated playing tunes simply, with little ornamentation, and playing notes for full length, closing the hole only briefly before the next note. He also argued that for dance tunes, one should imagine playing for dancers, and for song tunes, one should imagine the words. He also set great store by rhythmic precision - his background in Highland piping gave good training for this. He played a set with a nominal G pitched around F sharp, with a characteristically bright tone.
