= Arthur J. Lamb =

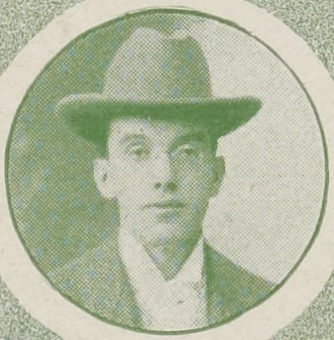

Background information
- Born: 12 August 1870; Somerset, England
- Died: 10 August 1928 (aged 57) Providence, Rhode Island, United States
- Genre: Oldtime
- Occupations: Composer, lyricist

Arthur J. Lamb (12 August 1870 – 10 August 1928) was a British lyricist best known for the 1897 song "Asleep in the Deep" and the 1900 song "A Bird in a Gilded Cage". He collaborated with many songwriters, including siblings Albert Von Tilzer and Harry Von Tilzer, Henry W. Petrie and Kerry Mills.

His fame faded and he died in poverty, his body saved from a potter's field burial by ASCAP, who paid for a proper burial for him.

== Selected works ==
- "Asleep in the Deep" (1897) m. Henry W. Petrie
- "Dreaming of Mother and Home" (1898)
- "At The Bottom of the Deep Blue Sea" (1899) m. Henry W. Petrie
- "A Bird in a Gilded Cage" (1900) m. Harry Von Tilzer
- "The Spider and the Fly" (1900) m. Harry Von Tilzer
- "When Wealth and Poverty Meet" (1900) m. Harry Von Tilzer
- "Out Where The Billows Roll High" (1901)
- "The Banquet in Misery Hall" (1902) m. Harry Von Tilzer
- "Jennie Lee" (1902) m. Harry Von Tilzer
- "The Mansion of Aching Hearts" (1902) m. Harry Von Tilzer
- "A Brand Plucked from the Burning" (1902) m. Kerry Mills
- "I Know She Waits for Me" (1902) m. Kerry Mills
- "Beneath the Palms of Paradise" (1903) m. Harry Von Tilzer
- "Like a Star That Falls From Heaven" (1903) m. Kerry Mills
- "When The Bell in the Lighthouse Rings Ding, Dong" (1905)
- "The Bird On Nellie's Hat" (1905)
- "Sunny Sue: A Coon Ditty" (1907) m. Florence McPherran
- "All She Gets from the Iceman is Ice" (1907)
- "You Splash Me and I'll Splash You" (1907)
- "Any Old Port in a Storm" (1908) m. Kerry Mills
- "If You Were Mine" (1908) m. Kerry Mills
- "You've Got the Wrong Number But the Right Girl" (1911) m. Kerry Mills
- "My Keepsake is a Heartache" (1915) m. Clarence M. Jones
- "Good Luck To The USA" (1917)
