= Industrial folk music =

Folk music genre

- Stylistic origins: Folk music; work songs
- Cultural origins: 1700s; Britain

Subgenres
- Blues ballads

Regional scenes
- Europe; United States

Industrial folk music, industrial folk song, industrial work song or working song is a subgenre of folk or traditional music that developed from the 18th century, particularly in Britain and North America, with songs dealing with the lives and experiences of industrial workers. The origins of industrial folk song are in the British Industrial Revolution of the eighteenth century as workers tended to take the forms of music with which they were familiar, including ballads and agricultural work songs, and adapt them to their new experiences and circumstances. They also developed in France and the US as these countries began to industrialise.

The genre declined in the twentieth century, but were popularised as part of the folk revival by A. L. Lloyd, George Korson, John Lomax, Pete Seeger, Alan Lomax and Archie Green. Because of their political content they have been adapted by rock musicians.

== Origins ==
Industrial folk song emerged in Britain, the first nation to industrialise, in the 18th century, as workers and their families moved from a predominately rural and agricultural society to an increasingly urban and industrial one. These workers tended to take the forms of music with which they were familiar, including ballads and agricultural work songs, and adapt them to their new experiences and circumstances. Unlike agricultural work songs, it was often unnecessary to use music to synchronise actions between workers, as the pace would be increasingly determined by water, steam, chemical and eventually electric power, and frequently impossible because of the noise of early industry. As a result, industrial folk songs tended to be descriptive of work, circumstances, or political in nature, making them amongst the earliest protest songs and were sung between work shifts or in leisure hours, rather than during work. This pattern can be seen in the first industry to fully develop, textile production, which was particularly important in Lancashire, with songs like 'Poverty knock' which described the relentless movement and noise of the loom. The same trends were soon evident in mining and eventually steel, shipbuilding, rail working and other industries. As other nations industrialised their folk song underwent a similar process of change, as can be seen for example in France, where Saint-Simon noted the rise of 'Chansons Industrielles' among clothworkers in the early 19th century, and in the USA where industrialisation expanded rapidly after the Civil War.

== Definitions and characteristics ==
A. L. Lloyd defined the industrial work song as 'the kind of vernacular songs made by workers themselves directly out of their own experiences, expressing their own interest and aspirations, and incidentally passed on among themselves by oral means...'. His definition did not include songs created by learned writers on behalf of the working class, but he was prepared to accept some popular and musical hall songs that had been adopted by the workers. His definition has been criticised, as it depends on a concept of a pure working class culture unaffected by outside class or media influences, which is at variance with what we know of the spread of ideas and new forms of media from the late 19th century.

Lloyd also pointed to various types of song, including chants of labour, love and erotic occupational songs and industrial protest songs, which included narratives of disasters (particularly among miners), laments for conditions, as well as overtly political strike ballads. He also noted the existence of songs about heroic and mythical figures of industrial work, like the coal miners the 'Big Hewer' or 'Big Isaac' Lewis. This tendency was even more marked in early American industrial songs, where representative heroes like Casey Jones and John Henry were eulogised in blues ballads from the 19th century.

== The folk revival ==
The first wave of folk song revival in Britain and America the later 19th century and early 20th century was largely unconcerned with recording industrial songs. It tended to focus on the rural and agricultural and has been criticised as being obsessed with a rural idyll. As a result, industrial songs tended to be seen as a threat to traditional forms of music, rather than a development from them. In the second wave of revival, which was much more influenced by progressive or labour politics and as a result tended to show a much greater interest in the lives of working people and their music. This movement was evident first in the USA where George Korson followed John Lomax's collection of the work songs of Cowboys with investigations of coal miner's songs, particularly from the Appalachians, from 1927. Despite reservations about these songs, whose authors were often known and so they did not fit into the mould of traditional music, after World War II folklorists largely accepted this music as folk song. Pete Seeger's Folkways LP American Industrial Ballads (1956) was an early survey of this kind of song. The American song collection of over 200 songs in Hard Hitting Songs For Hard Hit People by Woody Guthrie, Pete Seeger and Alan Lomax in the 1940s (not published till 1967), explored worker's song further. The work of labour historian Archie Green, which included the production of recordings of labour and work songs, provided a wider context for understanding industrial folk song within a wider field of 'labor lore'. Songs written by Seeger and Guthrie, were also important in continuing the tradition and moving it into progressive folk music. Among the most successful of these composed industrial songs was Merle Travis' Sixteen Tons, first recorded in 1946, but made probably the most commercially successful industrial song when it was a major hit for 'Tennessee' Ernie Ford in 1955.

In Britain the leading proponent of, and commentator on, industrial folk music was A. L. Lloyd. His Come All Ye Bold Miners: Ballads and Songs from the Coalfields, a collection of mining songs was published in 1952. Of his own recordings the most influential were his arrangement of various industrial songs on the LP The Iron Muse: a Panorama of Industrial Folk Song (1963). A. L. Lloyd wrote in the 1965 Encyclopædia Britannica a paragraph on 'Industrial Song', part his broader entry on 'Folk Music' and his Folk Song in England (1967) concluded with a chapter titled 'Industrial Folk Song', which popularised the term. Subsequently, David Harker criticised Lloyd for his romanticisation of industrial workers. The other major figure of the second British folk revival, Ewan MacColl also played a significant part in popularising British Industrial folk song, making Shuttle and Cage a 10" LP with Peggy Seeger for Topic Records in 1958 and alone an LP for Stinson in 1963 called British Industrial Folk Songs. From 1957 to 1964 probably the widest audience for British work songs was achieved through the Radio Ballads, of MacColl and Peggy Seeger, many of which focused on work, including rail workers, road building, fishing and coal mining. However, many of the songs in the Radio Ballads were written by MacColl himself in the style of the songs that he, Lloyd and others had collected e.g. 'Shoals of Herring'. In the British folk rock movement of the 1970s industrial folk music was less prominent than traditional ballads, but largely accepted as part of folk music, with songs like 'Blackleg Miner' being recorded beside medieval ballads by leading bands of the genre like Steeleye Span.

== Decline and survival ==
Industrial folk song overlapped with other forms of music from the late 19th century, such as Music hall and popular music and began to disappear as a genre from the mid-20th century as different forms of song provided alternatives and the decline of major industries began to undermine it. However, because of its political associations it has been revived, particularly in times of political and social upheaval such as the 1980s, when anarchist punk band Chumbawamba included several industrial work and protest songs on their English Rebel Songs 1381-1914 album (1988) and the tradition was taken up by folk artists like Billy Bragg. In the United States, arguably the most successful inheritor of the tradition is Bruce Springsteen, often focusing more on industrial decline in songs like "Youngstown" on his 1995 album The Ghost of Tom Joad. Songs from the tradition continue to be recorded, as in the Grammy nominated Music of Coal: Mining Songs from the Appalachian Coalfields (2007), a two CD compilation and booklet of mining songs.
