= Bill Leader =

English recording engineer (1929–2026)

- Born: 26 December 1929; New Jersey, U.S.
- Died: 31 March 2026 (aged 96)
- Occupations: Recording engineer Record Producer
- Years active: Late 1950s–2013
- Employer(s): Topic Records; Transatlantic Records

Bill Leader (26 December 1929 – 31 March 2026) was an English recording engineer and record producer. He is particularly associated with the British folk music revival of the 1960s and 1970s, producing records by Paddy Tunney, Davey Graham, Bert Jansch, John Renbourn, Frank Harte and many others.

== Life and career ==
Leader was born in New Jersey, United States on 26 December 1929, to British parents. His parents returned to the UK while he was still young and he was brought up in Dagenham, Mottingham and Shipley. Even as a child, he wanted to be a recording engineer and he moved back to London in 1955 to work in a film library at the Polish Embassy, with the intention of working in the film industry. He began working for Topic Records and particularly recorded some of the Irish folk musicians who were in London in the late 1950s, as well as releasing a Rambling Jack Elliott record for Topic. To supplement the meagre income from his recording work, he took a job in Collett's record shop (specialising in folk, blues and jazz records) in Oxford Street, London. Through his work in the shop, he met Nathan Joseph who had set up Transatlantic Records and, from 1962, began working with him, part-time, as a producer.

The early days of recording folk artists in England were characterised by low budgets and improvised technology. In the 1960s, Leader lived in Camden and, using a semi-professional Revox tape recorder, recorded a number of artists in his own flat, sound-proofing the room with blankets and egg boxes. John Renbourn described the early recordings of himself and Bert Jansch, in which Leader proceeded by "setting up the tape machine in the sink and having us play in the broom cupboard".

In 1969, together with his second wife, Helen, he set up two record labels: Leader and Trailer Records. The Leader label was intended for recordings like those made by Alan Lomax, with extensive academic liner notes. The Trailer label was focused on the revival scene. A recent compilation of Trailer tracks is Never The Same – Leave-Taking From the British Folk Revival 1970–1977, in which some biographical details are given.

Leader was in charge of the Audio Department at the University of Salford. https://www.theguardian.com/music/2026/apr/26/bill-leader-obituary

In 2009, the accompanying book to the Topic Records 70 year anniversary boxed set Three Score and Ten provides Leader's biography. The book lists classic albums, including some engineered or produced by Leader such as Her Mantle So Green (with Ewan MacColl), The Iron Muse and Frost And Fire (both with A.L. Lloyd), and Paddy In The Smoke.

Leader was honoured with a "Good Tradition" award, for his contributions to continuing the tradition of folk music, at the 2012 BBC Radio 2 Folk Awards at The Lowry theatre in Salford on 8 February 2012.

Leader died on 31 March 2026, at the age of 96.

== Discography ==
- Woody Guthrie's Blues (1955) – Rambling Jack Elliott
- Her Mantle So Green - Irish Street Songs And Fiddle Tunes (1965) – Margaret Barry & Michael Gorman. [Note: Recorded By – Bill Leader in 1955-1957 (tracks: A1, A3, A6, B1, B3 to B6), Ewan MacColl in 1965 (tracks: A2, A4, A5, B2)]
- John Gibbon's Disc (1957) – John Gibbon
- Peggy Seeger (1957) – Peggy Seeger
- Nancy Whiskey Sings (1957) – Nancy Whiskey
- 3/4 A.D. (1962) – Alexis Korner & Davey Graham
- The Iron Muse (A Panorama of Industrial Folk Songs) (1963) – compiled by A. L. Lloyd with Anne Briggs, Bob Davenport, Ray Fisher, Louis Killen, Matt McGinn and The Celebrated Working Man's Band
- Bert Jansch (1965) – Bert Jansch
- A Wild Bees Nest (1965) – Paddy Tunney
- Jack Orion (1966) – Bert Jansch
- The Irish Edge (1965) – Paddy Tunney
- The Watersons (1966) – The Watersons
- The Young Tradition (1966) – The Young Tradition
- Ireland Her Own (1965) – Paddy Tunney and Arthur Kearney, with Joe Tunney and Frank Kelly
- So Cheerfully Round (1967) – The Young Tradition
- Morning Stands On Tiptoe (1967) Dave and Toni Arthur
- Mason's Apron (1967) – The Dubliners
- Mainly Norfolk (1968) – Peter Bellamy
- Matt McGinn (1968) – Matt McGinn
- Paddy in the Smoke: Irish Dance Music from a London Pub (1968) - Various artists
- Humble Beginnings: The Complete Transatlantic Recordings, 1969–74 – Billy Connolly
- The Humblebums (1969) – The Humblebums
- Fair England’s Shore (1969) – Peter Bellamy
- The Lark In the Morning (1969) Dave and Toni Arthur with Barry Dransfield
- Young Hunting (1970) – Tony Rose
- Cruel Sister (1970) – Pentangle
- Hearken to the Witches Rune (1970) Dave and Toni Arthur
- New Humblebums (1970) – The Humblebums
- Mr. Fox (1970) – Mr. Fox
- Reflection (1971) – Pentangle
- He Came From the Mountains – Bob & Carole Pegg
- Rosemary Lane (1971) – Bert Jansch
- Tir Na Nóg (1971) – Tír na nÓg
- Tear and a Smile (1972) – Tír na nÓg
- Prosperous (1972) – Christy Moore
- A Lancashire Lad (1972) – Mike Harding
- Bright Phoebus (1972) – Mike and Lal Waterson
- No More Forever (1972) – Dick Gaughan
- The Boys of the Lough (1973) – The Boys of the Lough
- Swan Arcade (1973) – Swan Arcade
- Tell It Like It Was (1975) – Peter Bellamy
- The Barrack Room Ballads of Rudyard Kipling (1976) – Peter Bellamy
- Kist O'Gold (1977) – Dick Gaughan
- The Noah's Ark Trap (1977) – Nic Jones
- Gerry Rafferty (1978) – Gerry Rafferty
- From The Devil To A Stranger (1978) Nic Jones
- Oddfellows; The Oddfellows (2011)
- Shreds; Ian Reynolds (2012)
- That Was Then This Is Now (2013) – Hunter Muskett

=== Credited as engineer ===
- Jack Takes the Floor (1958) – Ramblin' Jack Elliott
- Chorus from the Gallows (1959) – Ewan MacColl
- Red Hot from Alex (1964) – Alexis Korner
- Bert and John (1966) – Bert Jansch & John Renbourn
- Another Monday (1967) – John Renbourn
- Sweet Primeroses (1967) – Shirley Collins
- Rags, Reels & Airs (1967) – Dave Swarbrick
- True Hearted Girl (1977) – The Watersons
- Her Mantle So Green – Margaret Barry & Michael Gorman

=== Other credits ===
- Across the Hills (1964) – Ian Campbell (credited as Supervisor)
- Ramblin' Jack Elliott Lost Topic Tapes: Cowes Harbour 1957 – Ramblin' Jack Elliott (credited as Assistant Engineer)
- Ramblin' Jack Elliott Lost Topic Tapes: Isle of Wight 1957 – Ramblin' Jack Elliott (credited as Assistant Engineer)

=== Leader/Trailer labels listing ===
A full listing of titles on the Leader and Trailer labels is in preparation on Folkopedia

== Bibliography ==
- Butler, Mike (2021) Sounding the Century: Bill Leader & Co.: Volume 1 – Glimpses of Far Off Things: 1855-1956 ISBN 978-1800460768
