= Harry Boardman =

English folk singer (1930––1987)

- Born: 1930; Failsworth, Lancashire, England
- Died: 1987 (aged 56–57)
- Genres: Folk
- Occupation: Musician
- Instruments: Anglo concertina and banjo

Harry Boardman (1930–1987) was an English folk singer who was born in Failsworth, Lancashire. He sang both unaccompanied and accompanying himself on the Anglo concertina or banjo. "Boardman has specialised in the lore, songs and dialect poems of his native Lancashire. A fine singer, his recorded and printed work has done much to preserve the otherwise ignored aspects of his local tradition."—Fred Woods.

He was active as a folk singer and collector of Lancashire folklore from the late 1950s, with some collaboration from his wife Lesley. In 1991 the Harry Boardman Memorial Trust was established to increase public awareness of traditional music and related arts, including the folk music of the British Isles and local traditions of North West England. Boardman appeared regularly, together with Dave Hillery and Terry Whelan, at the Wayfarer's Folk Club at various locations, including the Pack Horse Hotel on Bridge Street in Manchester from the late 1950s. He was a folk club organiser from 1954 until the year he died; the home of his club in the 1970s and 1980s was the Unicorn Hotel on Church Street in Manchester. His interest in the songs of working folk stemmed from his socialist beliefs.

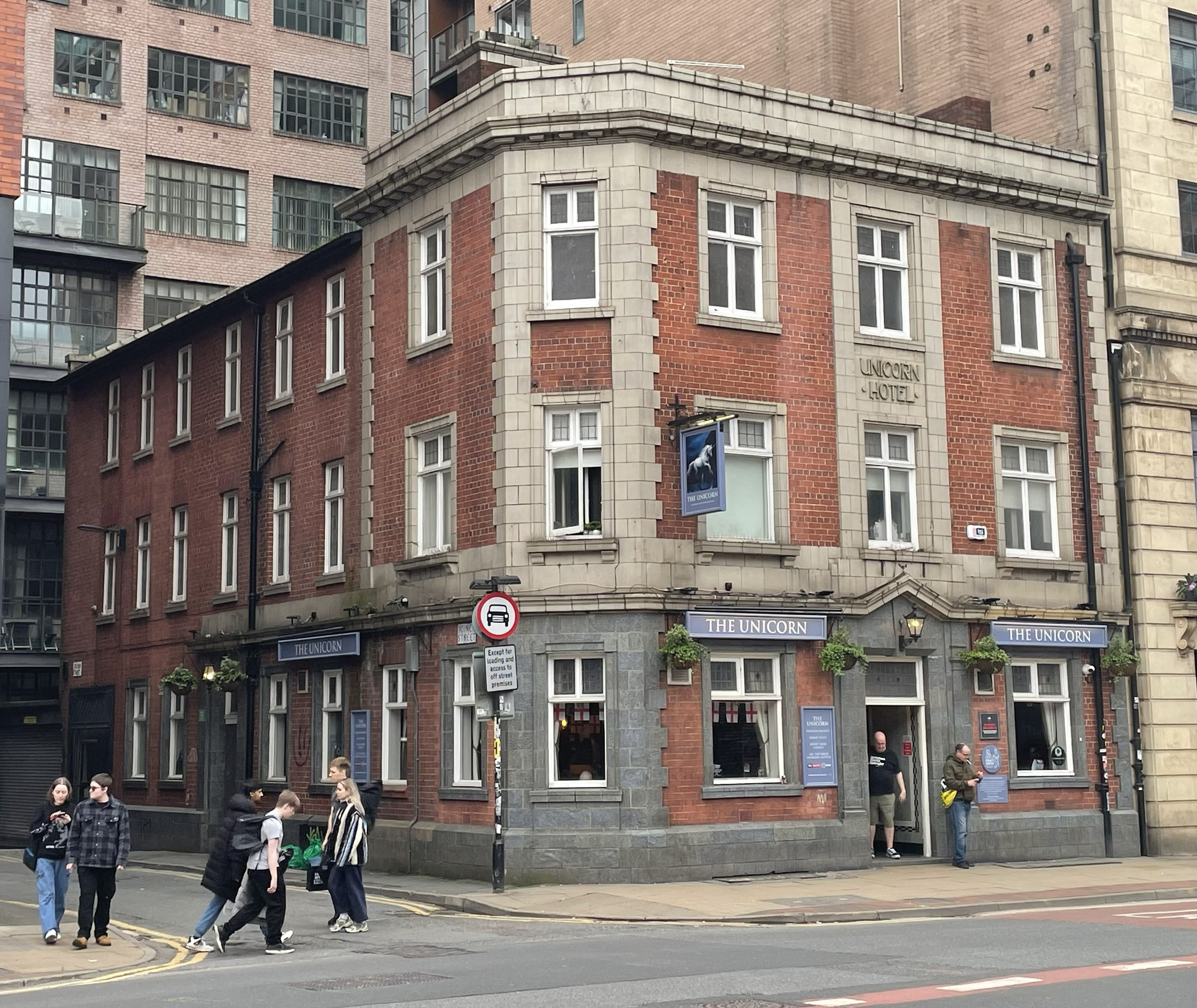
Unicorn Hotel, Church Street, Manchester

== Publications ==
- Folk Songs & Ballads of Lancashire; compiled and edited by Harry & Lesley Boardman. London & New York: Oak Publications, 1973 ISBN 0-86001-027-9
- Manchester Ballads: thirty-five facsimile street ballads; selected and edited by Harry Boardman & Roy Palmer. Manchester: City of Manchester Education Committee, 1983 ISBN 0904072029

== Discography ==
Boardman's recordings:

- A Lancashire Mon, Topic Records (1973)
- The Bonnie Pit Laddie, Topic Records (1975) (with The High Level Ranters and Dick Gaughan)
- Golden Stream, AK Records (1978)
- Personal Selection (1986)
- Personal Choice, Cock Robin Music (2008)

=== Compilations ===
- New Voices (with the Watersons & Maureen Craik), Topic Records (1965)
- Deep Lancashire (with the Oldham Tinkers et al.), Topic Records (1968; 1997)
- Owdham Edge (with the Oldham Tinkers et al.), Topic Records (1970)
- Trans Pennine (with Dave Hillery), Topic Records (1971)
- Steam Ballads (with Jon Raven et al.), Broadside (1977)
- The Iron Muse (with Louis Killen et al.), Topic Records (1993)

Only features on the CD version

- Three Score and Ten Topic Records (2009)

The Hand Loom Weaver's Lament from Deep Lancashire is track ten on the sixth CD.
