= Any Old Port in a Storm =

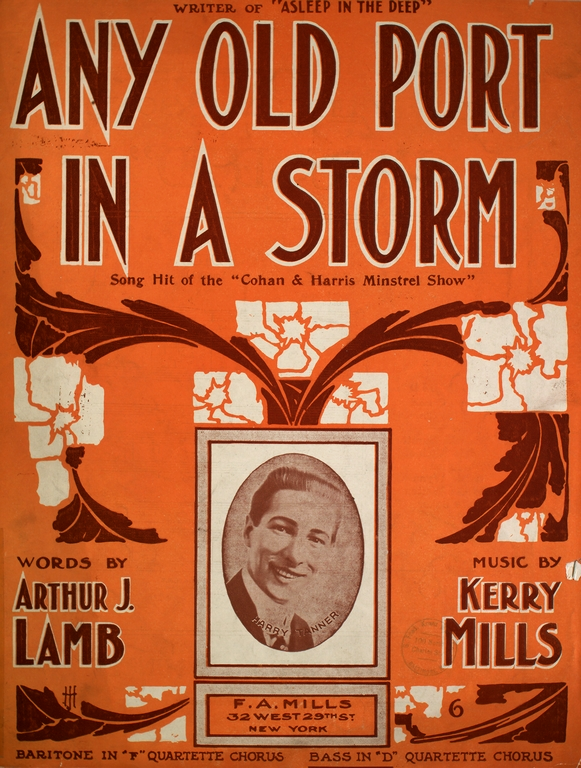
- Sheet music cover, 1908

Song
- Published: 1908
- Genre: Traditional pop
- Composer(s): Kerry Mills
- Lyricist(s): Arthur J. Lamb

"Any Old Port in a Storm" is a popular song composed by Kerry Mills with lyrics by Arthur J. Lamb. Published in 1908, it has been recorded many times. The lyrics as published:

Out on the billows the good ship tossed
But a brave little craft was she,
Tho' the thunder roared,
And the torrents pourd,
In the pit of the angry sea;
And the captain stood on the surf swept deck
And he looked o'er the seething foam,
He murmered "We're far from the harbor bar
And far from the lights of home.
But e'en as he gazed, he cried,
"There's land on the starboard side,
Ship ahoy!— Ship ahoy!"

(Chorus):
Any old port in a storm lads
Whatever that port may be,
And thanks be given our Father in Heav'n
Who watches o'er you and me,
Tho', we're far, far away from the land we seek
Where the heart of true love beats warm;
For the shelter there, is a haven fair;
Any old port in a storm,
Any old port in a storm.

Close to the vessel the lifeboat rocked
With its cargo of souls inside,
But the captain stood
On the sinking deck,
"There is no room for me: he cried;
"Do not wait my lads!" "Pull away!' he said,
And the life boat shot o'er the sea.
He murmered low, "Tis my time to go
Another port waits for me."
Then in the embrace of death,
He sang with his failing breath,
"Ship ahoy!— Ship ahoy!"

(Chorus)

== Bibliography ==
- Lamb, Arthur J. (w); Mills, Kerry (m). "Any Old Port In A Storm". New York: F.A. Mills (1908).
