= Adrian Schofield =

Adrian D Schofield is a player of the Northumbrian smallpipes, the traditional bagpipe of North East of England. In 1988, Schofield joined with pipers Pauline Cato and Colin Ross in forming the band Border Spirit.

Schofield's style of playing was initially heavily influenced by that of Border musician Billy Pigg (1902-1968). Schofield produced a biography of Pigg, The Border Minstrel (ISBN 0-902510-16-9) researched by Adrian D Schofield and edited by Julia Say, which included all of Pigg's known compositions, and some other tunes from his repertoire, and was published by the Northumbrian Pipers' Society in 1997. Later in his piping career, Schofield turned to favor the more close-fingered detached method of traditional pipers such as Tom Clough.

== Works ==
=== Discography ===
- 1987 - Hindley Steel (Common Ground, CGR001) (in Border Spirit)
- 1993 - Jane of Biddlestone (Common Ground, CGR 007) 1993.
- 1999 - Spirit of the Border: Northumbrian Traditional Music. (Nimbus Records, NI 5615)

=== Bibliography ===
- 1997 - The Border Minstrel (Northumbrian Pipers' Society, ISBN 0-902510-16-9)
