= Florence McPherran =

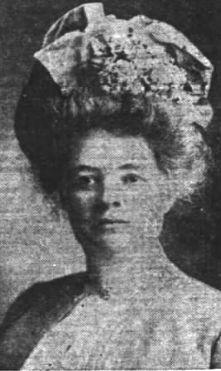
- Florence McPherran, from a 1903 newspaper.
- Born: Florence Kilbourne Crossman; February 1860; St. Johnsbury, Vermont
- Died: August 19, 1921 (aged 61); Pasadena, California
- Occupations: Composer, pianist
- Years active: 1900-1910

Florence Kilbourne McPherran (February 1860 – August 19, 1921) was an American pianist and composer of popular tunes, based in Chicago, Illinois.

== Music ==
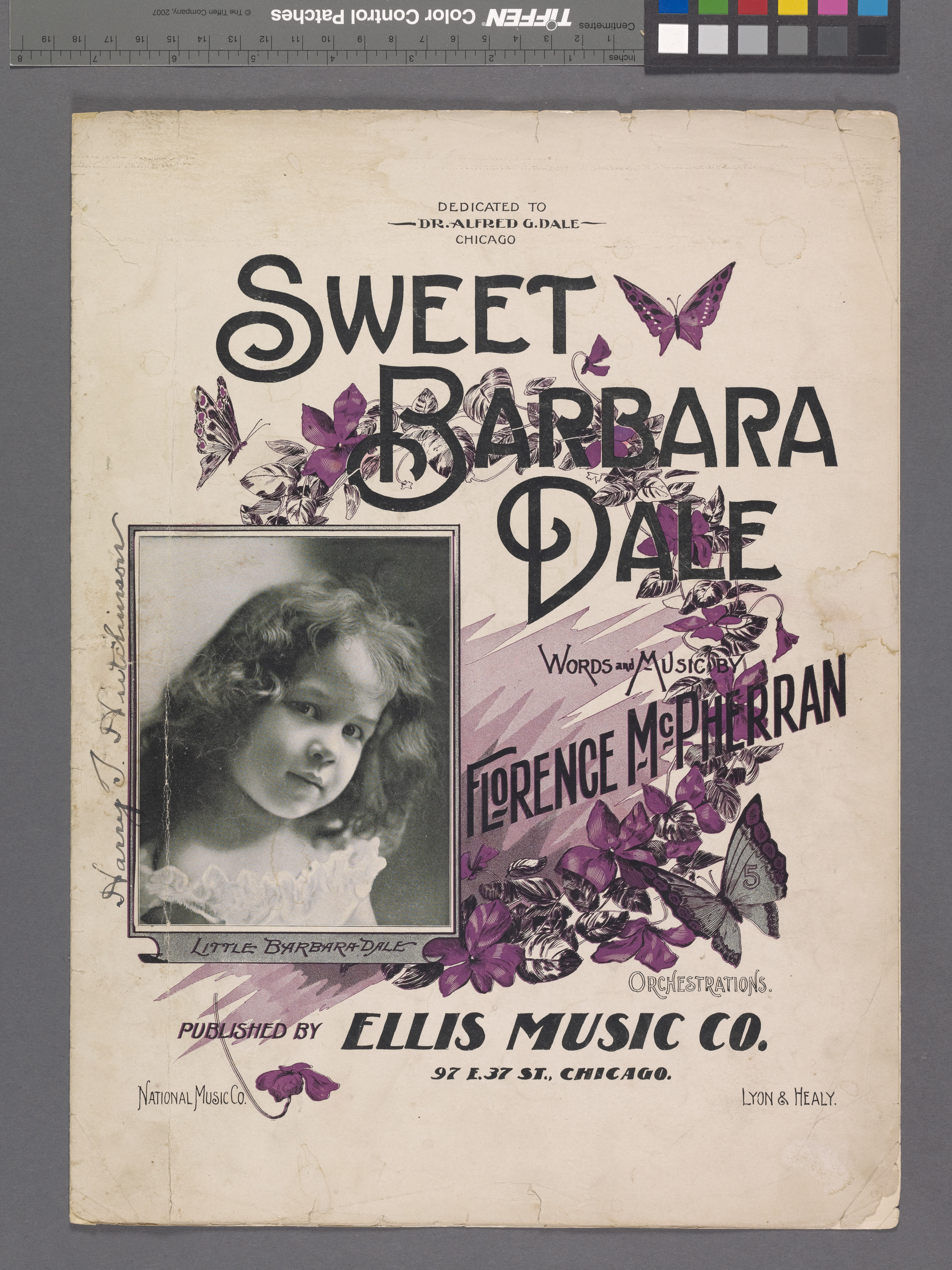
"Sweet Barbara Dale" (1900) (NYPL Hades-609037-1257199), words and music by Florence McPherran

By 1903, McPherran was well known in Chicago as a pianist and composer. Published works by McPherran included "The Spinning Song" (1900), "Sweet Barbara Dale" (1900), "I's Got No Use Foh Show Folks" (1901, lyrics by Richard Hanch), "Eugenia Waltzes", "Laughing Lucas: Characteristic March and Two-step" (1901), "The Sleeping Beauty and the Beast/I Only Know I Love You" (1902, lyrics by Gilbert Hollman), "I Wonder If 'Twas Very Wrong?" (1902, lyrics by Gilbert Hollman), "Cuddle Up, Huddle Up: Ethiopian Lullaby" (1903, lyrics by Richard Hanch), "My Heart is Yours" (1903, lyrics by Richard Hanch), "When Love's Dream was in Bloom" (1903, lyrics by W. L. Titus), "Under the Wire: March and Two-step" (1904), "One Thought of You", "The Tale of the Snowflake" (1905), "Nedra: Waltzes" (1906), "La Zurita: Intermezzo Two-Step" (1907), "Fi-Fi: Novelette Two-step" (1907), "Dottie Dimple March and Two-step" (1907), and "Sunny Sue: A Coon Ditty" (1907, lyrics by Arthur J. Lamb). Several of her tunes were available on piano rolls.

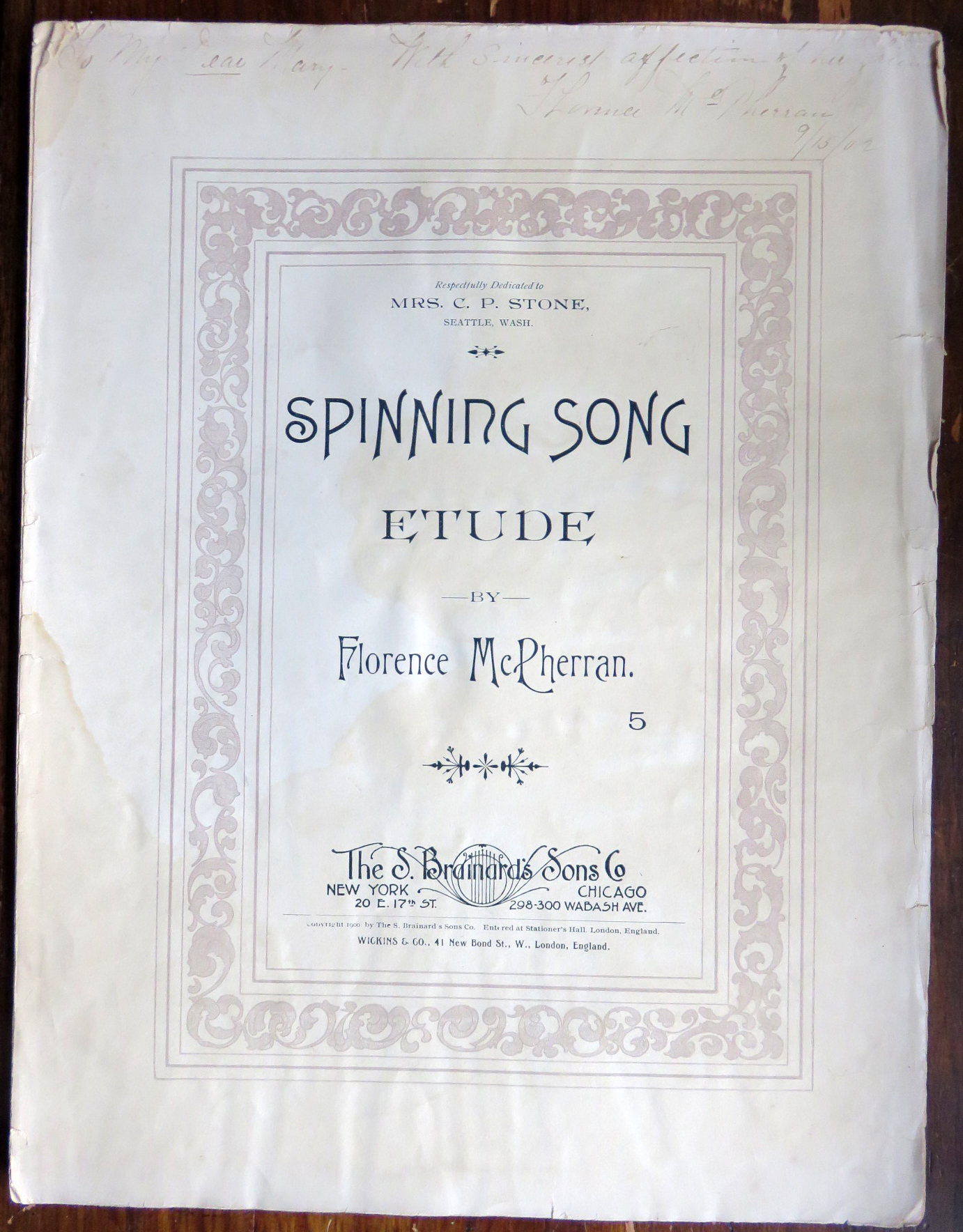
Sheet Music Entitled "Spinning Song" by Florence McPherran (1900)

== Personal life ==
Florence Klibourne Crossman was born in St. Johnsbury, Vermont, the daughter of I. Crossman and Mary J. Kilbourne Crossman. She was raised and educated in Chicago.

Florence Crossman married Canadian-born Chicago stock broker, Edward Hammond McPherran, in 1891. The McPherrans moved to Pasadena, California by 1906, and built a house there. She inherited another Pasadena home from her aunt, Elmira C. Stone, widow of Seattle mayor, in 1912. She was widowed in 1919 when Edward McPherran died. She died in 1921, in Pasadena.
