= Thurland Chattaway =

American composer

- Born: Thurland Chattaway; April 8, 1872; Springfield, Massachusetts. United States
- Died: November 12, 1947 (aged 75); Milford, Connecticut, United States
- Occupation: Composer

Thurland Chattaway (April 8, 1872 – November 12, 1947) was an American composer of popular music, active from approximately 1898 to 1912. He is best known for writing the words to the popular 1907 hit "Red Wing" with Kerry Mills. Other songs include "Little Black Me" and "Can't You Take It Back and Change It For a Boy".

== Biography ==
Chattaway was born in Springfield, Massachusetts and became a boy soprano before going to New York City in 1896, where he worked for a music magazine edited by Paul Dresser. He increasingly devoted his time to songwriting, writing "Mandy Lee" (1899), "When the Blue Sky Turns to Gold" (1901), "My Honey Lou" (1904), and "Red Wing" (1907).

He died in Milford, Connecticut, aged 75.
