= George Korson =

American historian

George Korson (August 8, 1899 – May 23, 1967) was a folklorist, journalist, and historian. He has been cited as a pioneer collector of industrial folklore, and according to Michael Taft of the Library of Congress, "may very well be considered the father of occupational folklore studies in the United States." In addition to writing and editing a number of influential books, he also issued his field recordings of coal miners on two LP records for the Library of Congress.

The first of six children, Korson was brought by his parents Joseph and Rose from Bobrynets, Ukraine to the United States in 1906 when he was seven years old. After a brief time in Brooklyn, New York, the family relocated to the coal-mining city of Wilkes-Barre, Pennsylvania, when George was thirteen years old. Involved with his high school newspaper, he landed a job after high school as a reporter for the Wilkes-Barre Record. He briefly attended Columbia University to pursue studies in English and history in 1921–1922, but was forced to return home by his family's financial difficulties.

Upon his return he joined the staff of the Pottsville Republican. Assigned to cover miners and their families in Schuylkill County, Pennsylvania, he began collecting songs and stories from them for special features and educated himself in folklore and folk song studies of the period and region. The collection was unprecedented because folklorists previously had concentrated mostly on rural Anglo-American balladry of mountaineers, cowboys, and lumbermen. His collection drew attention for showing emergent folklore of industrial life, labor movements, and immigrant traditions in a mixed-ethnic social context. In 1927, he issued his collections in book form as Songs and Ballads of the Anthracite Miner, followed by publications that included narrative and customary traditions of coal miners, such as Black Rock: Mining Folklore of the Pennsylvania Dutch (1960, winner of the Chicago Folklore Prize in that year), Coal Dust on the Fiddle: Songs and Stories of the Bituminous Industry (1943), and his essay on "coal miners' for Pennsylvania Songs and Legends (1949), which he edited. In 1936, he became director of the Pennsylvania Folk Festival, and he served three terms as president of the Pennsylvania Folklore Society.

Korson received a Guggenheim Fellowship in 1957 to work on Black Rock, and garnered more national recognition for his folklore work with induction in 1960 into the American Folklore Society's honorary circle of Fellows. During the 1950s, Korson worked for the UMWA and the Red Cross in Washington, D.C., and travelled to Pennsylvania to add to his field collections in song and story.

In 1965 he donated his collection of papers and recordings to the D. Leonard Corgan Library at King's College in Wilkes-Barre. In 2004, the American Folklife Center of the Library of Congress announced the transfer of the collection to the Library. His field trips into the coal region were undertaken despite his battles with heart disease for much of his later life. Korson died on May 23, 1967, in New Jersey, aged 67, after suffering his seventh heart attack.

In 2026, Korson was announced as a posthumous inductee into the Luzerne County Arts & Entertainment Hall of Fame.

== Books ==
Korson, George. 1927. Songs and Ballads of the Anthracite Miners. New York: Frederick H. Hitchcock, Grafton Press.

———. 1937. Pennsylvania Folk Songs and Ballads for School, Camp, and Playground. Lewisburg, PA: Pennsylvania Folk Festival.

———. 1938. Minstrels of the Mine Patch: Songs and Stories of the Anthracite Industry. Philadelphia: University of Pennsylvania Press; rpt. Hatboro, PA: Folklore Associates, 1964.

———. 1943. Coal Dust on the Fiddle: Songs and Stories of the Bituminous Industry. Philadelphia: University of Pennsylvania Press; rpt. Hatboro, PA: Folklore Associates, 1965.

———, ed. 1949. Pennsylvania Songs and Legends. Philadelphia: University of Pennsylvania Press; rpt. Baltimore: Johns Hopkins University Press, 1960.

———. 1960. Black Rock: Mining Folklore of the Pennsylvania Dutch. Baltimore: Johns Hopkins University Press.

== Recordings ==
Korson, George, ed. 1947. Songs and Ballads of the Anthracite Miners. Washington, DC: Library of Congress, Division of Music, Recording Laboratory, AFS L16.

———. 1965. Songs and Ballads of the Bituminous Miners. Washington, DC: Library of Congress, Division of Music, Recording Laboratory, AFS L60.
