= Forster Charlton =

English musician (1915–1989)

John Forster Charlton (1915–1989), was an English traditional musician from near Hexham, Northumberland, who later settled in Gateshead. He at first played fiddle, but later also took up the Northumbrian smallpipes. He was a major figure in the folk music revival during the 1950s and 1960s, and an active member of the Northumbrian Pipers' Society. He was a founder member of the High Level Ranters, playing fiddle and smallpipes on their first record, Northumberland for Ever, but he subsequently left the group. Later, he played in a country dance band, The Borderers.

He was very active in recording traditional musicians in the area, notably Billy Pigg, and he would take a portable tape recorder to sessions and festivals. Several of these recordings were used to compile the record Billy Pigg, the Border Minstrel, while many more may be heard on the FARNE archive. Besides Billy Pigg, musicians he recorded include Joe Hutton, Diana Blackett-Ord, Richard Flemming and George Atkinson, as well as some duet recordings of himself with Colin Caisley. He also made, but did not retain, a recording of Tom Clough, late in the latter's life.

He was also a pipemaker and is believed to have made the first concert-pitch Northumbrian smallpipe chanter, for Pigg. Billy Pigg on pipes, John Doonan on piccolo and Forster Charlton on fiddle, liked to play as a trio, but smallpipes were traditionally pitched rather lower than modern concert pitch. Correcting for this by using a very sharp reed in the smallpipes and pulling out the tuning slide of the piccolo caused intonation problems. However, it is not known whether Pigg ever used this chanter regularly.

He also had a great interest in other types of bagpipes. During the 1950s and 1960s, he invited prominent uilleann pipers, including the McPeakes, Seamus Ennis and Leo Rowsome, to Northumberland to play at concerts. Similarly, when the triennial International Bagpipe Festival at Strakonice in Southern Bohemia was founded, Josef Režný persuaded Charlton to come as a representative of the Northumbrian Pipers' Society. From 1968 until 1986, and later with other pipers, he would go to Strakonice. This connection led to some of Režný's arrangements for dudy of traditional Czech music, being adapted for smallpipes.

He was planning another trip to Strakonice in 1989, despite his poor health, but died before it took place. He was driving from his home in Gateshead to his brother's funeral in Lesbury, in northern Northumberland, when he had a fatal road accident.

He was a prolific composer of tunes in traditional style, notably "The Rowley Burn Hornpipe".

== Some compositions ==
- "Coquetdale Waltz"
- "Harry's Rant"
- "The Hills of Home" (slow march)
- "Jim Hall's Fancy"
- "Gateshead Stadium" (rant)
- "The Joy of Living" (hornpipe)
- "The North Star" (hornpipe)
- "Ovingham Goose Fair" (march)
- "The Rowley Burn Hornpipe"
