= Matt McGinn (Scottish songwriter) =

Scottish folksinger and songwriter (1928–1977)

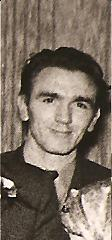
McGinn, c. 1954

Matthew McGinn (17 January 1928 – 5 January 1977) was a Scottish folk singer-songwriter, actor, author and poet. Born in Glasgow in 1928, McGinn was a prolific songwriter and is recognised as an influential figure in the British folk music revival of the late 1950s and early 1960s.

== Biography ==
Matt McGinn was born in Ross Street at the corner of the Gallowgate in Calton, in the East End of Glasgow, on 17 January 1928. Born the eighth child of a family of nine, his formal education ended when he entered an approved school at the age of 12. Despite this, McGinn was, by his early 20s, recognised as a highly political charismatic debater of left-wing politics. On his release from approved school he worked in the Hillington factory of GKN, spending his spare time at evening classes and reading. He gained a Trade Union scholarship to study economics and political science at Ruskin College in Oxford when he was 31. After graduating, he trained to become a teacher at Huddersfield Teachers' Training College and went on to work as a teacher in Lanarkshire for three years before becoming the organiser of the Gorbals Adventure Playground.

Matt McGinn received a degree from Ruskin College, Oxford, which focuses on providing education for working-class individuals, and awarded him a diploma in economics and political science.

McGinn joined the folk scene after winning a song contest with a song entitled "The Foreman O'Rourke". He met Pete Seeger in 1961 when Seeger was touring the British Isles. Seeger championed McGinn's music in the United States and arranged for him to be part of a concert performance at Carnegie Hall, where McGinn met a young Bob Dylan. His career in music began during the folk revival of the 1960s but, while others leaned towards what they perceived traditional music, McGinn carved his own niche as a humourist and playwright as well as a singer/songwriter. He was a prolific songwriter, drawing on his experiences of Glasgow life for much of his material. He was a communist, republican and trade unionist, and a member of the Communist Party of Great Britain. His performances in clubs and concert halls were hugely popular. McGinn's earliest recording was in 1962 when he was featured on the Folkways Records Revival in Britain, Vol. 1a collection compiled by Ewan MacColl. He was also featured, alongside Bob Dylan and Pete Seeger, on the Broadside Ballads Vol. 1 released in 1963. McGinn was also included in the 2000 compilation The Best of Broadside 1962–1988, which was nominated for a Grammy in the Best Historical Album category in 2001.

Matt McGinn embraced the "Folk Song Revival" of the 60s and brought to this his talent as a poet, his humour and his wealth of knowledge and experience of the ordinary folk of Glasgow and West of Scotland. It was never his ambition to be a singer/songwriter but considered tunes and melodies as a vehicle to express and propagate his beliefs and politics.

Perhaps a recent description of him as a people's historian is fitting. McGinn brought together his musical abilities, perception, humour, knowledge, politics and personal experience, to leave a history in words and music of the life and times of Scottish people, in particular Glasgow and the West.

McGinn also wrote songs for children, one of which, "Little Ticks of Time," was frequently used in the BBC children's programme Play School and its offshoots such as Hokey Cokey. The song was also featured in the 2011 Franco-German film Goodbye First Love (French: Un amour de jeunesse) directed by Mia Hansen-Løve. Well known recordings of McGinn include "Loch Lomond", ″The Rolling Hills of the Border″, ″I have seen the Highlands″, ″The Jeely Piece Song″ (written by another stalwart of Glasgow music, Adam McNaughtan), ″The Big Effen Bee″, ″Skinny Malinky Longlegs″, ″The Red Yo Yo″, ″Gallowgate Calypso″, ″The Ibrox Disaster″ and ″The Wee Kirkcudbright Centipede″.

McGinn's first novel about his time in approved school Fry the Little Fishes was first published in 1975 (ISBN 0714509922) 2nd edition re-issued 2013 (ISBN 978-1-873586-06-8)

There is a wealth of information about McGinn, as well as the words and music of some of his songs in the book McGinn of the Calton, collated by Janette McGinn, and originally published by Glasgow District Libraries in 1987 (ISBN 0-906169-15-1).

McGinn's songs are still performed by folk musicians in Scotland and America at tribute concerts. McGinn's songs have been recorded by Pete Seeger, The Weavers, Theodore Bikel, The Corries, Luke Kelly, The Chinese Man, The Ian Campbell Folk Group, Barry Dransfield & Rachel Unthank and the Winterset, among others.

In Jim Hosking's 2018 movie An Evening with Beverly Luff Linn, McGinn's songs "Little Ticks of Time" and "The Footba' Referee" are sung by Craig Robinson, performing alongside Matt Berry.

McGinn died on 5 January 1977 of smoke inhalation, aged 48 (12 days short of his 49th birthday), after falling asleep with a lit cigarette in his hand. The post mortem revealed that there was no trace of alcohol in McGinn's blood.

In January 2019 a blue plaque for McGinn was installed in the Calton district of Glasgow's East End.

== Discography ==
A partial list of musical recordings:

The Iron Muse(A Panorama of Industrial Folk Song) 1963 Topic

A thematic album which features Matt McGinn as one of the singers and a songwriter

Matt McGinn 1966 Transatlantic

Matt McGinn Again 1967 Transatlantic

"The Boys From Lisbon" (7-inch Single) 1968 Transatlantic

"I Have Seen The Highlands" & "I'll Be Coming Home To Glasgow" (7-inch Single) 1968 Transatlantic

Honesty Is Out of The Fashion 1968 Transatlantic

Little Ticks of Time 1969 Transatlantic

The Matt McGinn Sampler 1969 Transatlantic

Take Me Back to the Jungle 1971 RCA INTS

Tinny Can on My Tail 1972 RCA INTS

The Two Heided Man 1972 Emerald Gem

Magic Shadow Show (7-inch EP) 1973 Moonbeam

The Two Heided Man Strikes Again 1974 Emerald Gem

Screwtops Are Falling on My Head 1975 Pye

Ma Wee Auntie Sarah & Granda 1975 Pye

== Currently available CDs ==
- Revival in Britain Volume 1 (first side only, other side various artists – compiled by Ewan MacColl in 1962)
- The Best of Matt McGinn (comprising around 50% of McGinn's 1966–69 output on Transatlantic Records)
- The Best of Matt McGinn Volume Two (comprising McGinn's albums Take Me Back to the Jungle (1971) and Tinny Can on My Tail (1972) plus 1 track from the Magic Shadow Show EP). (Now deleted)
- The Return of the Two Heided Man (comprising most of the live albums The Two Heided Man (1973) and The Two Heided Man Strikes Again (1974))
- On The Road From Aldermaston: Complete Transatlantic Recordings (1966-1969) (2017)
