= Kerry Mills =

American composer (1869–1948)

- Born: Frederick Allen Mills; 1 February 1869; Philadelphia, Pennsylvania, United States
- Died: 5 December 1948 (aged 79); Hawthorne, California, United States
- Other name: F. A. Mills
- Occupations: Composer, music publisher

Kerry Mills (né Frederick Allen Mills; 1 February 1869 in Philadelphia – 5 December 1948 in Hawthorne, California), was an American ragtime composer and a publisher of popular music during the Tin Pan Alley era. His stylistically diverse music ranged from ragtime through cakewalk to marches. He was most prolific between 1895 and 1918.

== Career ==
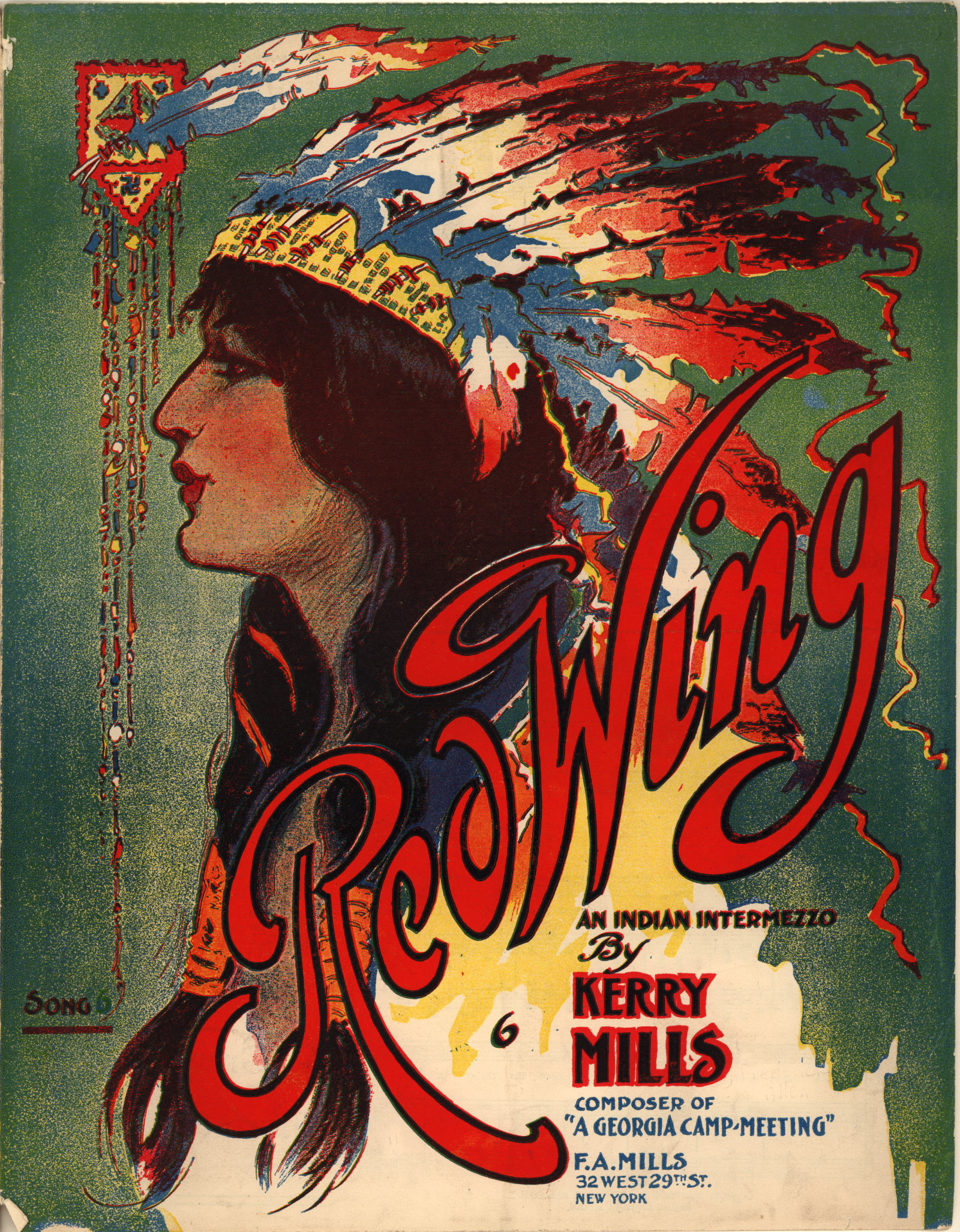
Red Wing 1907 sheet music

Mills trained as a violinist and was head of the violin department of the University of Michigan School of Music when he began composing. He moved to New York City in 1895 and started the music publishing firm F. A. Mills to publish his own work and that of others. The company went bankrupt in 1915 and was acquired by Maurice Richmond, who sold on many of the songs.

== Selected works ==
- "In the City of Sighs and Tears"
- "Just for the Sake of Society"
- "Let's All Go Up to Maud's"
- "The Longest Way 'Round Is the Sweetest Way Home"
- "Meet Me in St. Louis, Louis" (words by Andrew B. Sterling)
- 1895: "Rastus on Parade – Characteristic Two Step March for Piano"
- 1895: "Shandon Bells – Two Step March"
- 1896: "Happy Days in Dixie – Characteristic March"
- 1897: "At a Georgia Camp Meeting – A Characteristic March"
- 1899: "Whistling Rufus – Characteristic Two Step March, Polka & Cakewalk"
- 1899: "Impecunious Davis – A Characteristic March"
- 1900 or before: "Cake-Walk"
- 1900: "Kerry Mills Medley – Themes from Previous Cake Walk and Songs"
- 1902: "Harmony Moze – Characteristic Two Step"
- 1902: "A Brand Plucked from the Burning" (words by Alfred Bryan)
- 1902: "I Know She Waits for Me" (words by Alfred Bryan)
- 1903: "Valse Hélène"
- 1903: " 'Leven Forty-Five From The Hotel – Two Step March"
- 1903: "Me and Me Banjo – Characteristic Piece"
- 1903: "Petite causerie (A Quiet Chat)"
- 1903: "L'amour aux bois (Cupid's Bower)"
- 1903: "Valse Primrose (Les Primevères)"
- 1903: "Like a Star that Falls from Heaven" (words by Alfred Bryan)
- 1904: "We'll Be Together When the Clouds Roll By" (words by Alfred Bryan)
- 1906: "Old Heidelberg – Characteristic Two Step March"
- 1906: "While the Old Mill Wheel Is Turning" (words by Will D. Cobb)
- 1907: "Red Wing – An Indian Intermezzo" (words by Thurland Chattaway; the verse melody [but not the refrain] is from Schumann's "The Happy Farmer")
- 1908: "Kerry Mills Barn Dance"
- 1908: "Sun Bird – Intermezzo"
- 1908: "Hallie (A Little Romance)"
- 1908: "Sweet Sixteens – March"
- 1908: "Any Old Port in a Storm" (words by Arthur J. Lamb)
- 1908: "If You Were Mine" (words by Arthur J. Lamb)
- 1909: "Comical Eyes" (words by Bartley C. Costello)
- 1909: "Kerry Mills Rag Time Dance"
- 1909: "A Georgia Barn Dance"
- 1909: "The Scarf Dancer – A Novelty Two Step"
- 1909: "Lily of the Prairie – Two Step Intermezzo"
- 1909: "Sicilian Chimes – Reverie"
- 1909: "Kerry Mills Potpourri"
- 1909: "Don't Be an Old Maid, Molly"
- 1909: "Where Were You Last Night?" (words by Alfred Bryan)
- 1909: "A Georgia Barn Dance"
- 1910: "That Fascinating Ragtime Glide"
- 1910: "Valley Flower – Intermezzo"
- 1910: "Kerry Mills Palmetto Slide"
- 1910: "The Wyoming Prance – A Rag Time Two Step"
- 1910: "I've Lost My Nannie"
- 1911: "You've Got the Wrong Number, But You've Got the Right Girl" (words by Arthur J. Lamb)
- 1914: "Kerry Mills Turkey Trot"
- 1914: "Kerry Mills Fox Trot"
- 1918: "Snooky Hollow – Intermezzo"
- 1919: "Tokio – Fox Trot on Chorus from Geisha Girl"

== See also ==
- List of ragtime composers
