= Billy Pigg =

English piper (1902–1968)

Billy Pigg

Billy Pigg (1902 – 1968) was an English player of Northumbrian smallpipes. He was a vice-president and an influential member of the Northumbrian Pipers Society from 1930 until his death.

== Life and music ==
He was born at Dilston Park, near Corbridge, Northumberland, in January 1902 and died in November 1968. He learned the instrument from several pipers including Tom and Henry Clough as well as Richard Mowat, but, according to Tommy Breckons, Batey of Stannington was his main teacher. Tommy later quoted Billy's reminiscences of the informal sessions at the Cloughs' and others: When he lived at Blagdon, he used to bike down to Clough's. There were fourteen or fifteen pipers all living in that area, and they took turns to play at each other's houses, including Billy's. Billy told him that when he first went to one of these sessions there were fourteen pipers in the house, ..., and everyone was better than me! By God..., there were some good pipers. But all I had to dee was practice and get up alongside them. He learned by ear at this stage, and when he won a learners' competition in 1923, it was noted that he played the Barrington Hornpipe, but not quite as it is written. An early photograph of him from 1924, with a new set of pipes, is at the Woodhorn Museum website - he had won a Learners' Competition organised by William Cocks in this year, when he had been playing for three and a half years. The pipes in the photograph are the set made by Cocks, and offered as a trophy in the Competition. Billy went on to win these pipes outright in 1927. After he won the Spencer Cup at Bellingham Show in 1928, Cocks recorded that he was debarred from most contests, 'to give other pipers a chance'. At this time he must certainly have been playing in the traditional staccato style characteristic of the instrument, though in later years his style was much freer.

In 1930 he moved with his parents to a farm in Coquetdale, in the north of the county. He subsequently began playing with other musicians in this area, particularly John Armstrong and Annie Snaith, and later Archie Dagg – together the band were known as the Border Minstrels. In the 1950s he was noted for playing not only Northumbrian, but also Scottish and Irish tunes on the smallpipes. He also wrote many fine tunes for the instrument. A. D. Schofield and Julia Say produced a biography and tune book, The Border Minstrel, published by the Northumbrian Pipers' Society in 1997. This includes all his known compositions. These include the slow airs The Gypsy's Lullaby and Border Spirit, marches in 6/8 and 4/4 such as Bonny Woodside and The Old Drove Road, many hornpipes, including The Carrick Hornpipe and The Biddlestone Hornpipe, jigs such as Coffee Bridge and reels such as Cote Walls and Anne of Hindhope. One of his most spectacular pieces is Bill Charlton's Fancy, a 6/8 variation set. His version of the traditional tune, The Wild Hills of Wannies with his own variations, was entirely distinctive, and a good example of his Highland-influenced style.

During the 1950s Forster Charlton recorded his playing on many occasions; some of these can be heard on Radio FARNE. In 1958 Royce Wilson, an American working in Newcastle upon Tyne, acquired a tape recorder and made some recordings of him. Other recordings were made by the BBC and by the School of Scottish Studies. An album of selected recordings made by Forster Charlton was issued as Billy Pigg, the Border Minstrel on the Leader label in 1971, and re-released on CD in 2002. Through these recordings of Pigg's own compositions and his repertoire of traditional tunes, Pigg became influential throughout the world of bagpiping. Most players of the instrument will have several of Pigg's compositions in their repertoire.

Recently the Northumbrian Pipers' Society issued an expanded second edition of his music, the two volumes respectively covering his own compositions and his distinctive versions of other tunes. They also include a description of his playing style as well as transcriptions, some in great detail, of most of the surviving recordings.

=== Playing style ===
The distinguishing characteristic of Pigg's playing style is the use of complex open-fingered ornaments, in imitation of Irish and Highland piping. His father was a Highland piper, while Billy himself had great interest in Irish music. By contrast, most respected pipers before him would have stuck with an almost wholly staccato style. Tom Clough considered that any departure from this, a style where the chanter was closed and silent between any two notes, would be "a grievous error in smallpipe playing".

It is possible to compare his style with that of Tom Clough. The popular variation set for Northumbrian pipes Holey Ha'penny which is based on a simpler tune known elsewhere in the UK and Ireland as The Chorus Jig, was recorded by Pigg, and Tom Clough in the 1920s. The contrast between the two styles can easily be heard between these recordings.

Pigg employed a more open-fingered playing style, which differed from more traditional approaches and allowed for a broader range of musical expression. His tempi were often notably fast, and his performances were generally intended for listening rather than for dancing.

During the 1950s and 1960s, when his recordings were made, he experienced a period of declining health, which may have affected his playing. Despite this, his recordings from this period are noted for their intensity and distinctive character.

He has been hugely influential, and many pipers have sought to emulate his style, notably Adrian Schofield.

== Discography ==
- 1971 Billy Pigg, The Border Minstrel Leader
- 1974 Wild Hills O'Wannie, The Small Pipes of Northumbria Topic compilation with five tracks by Billy now available as a download

In 2009, "Skye Crofter's / The Swallow Tail" from Wild Hills O'Wannie, The Small Pipes of Northumbria, was included in Topic Records 70-year anniversary boxed set Three Score and Ten as track one on the seventh CD.
