= Ray Fisher (singer) =

Scottish folk singer

Ray Galbraith Fisher (26 November 1940 – 31 August 2011) was a Scottish folk singer. The Scotsman has called her "perhaps the best-known Scots folksinger of her generation", and The Guardian, "one of Britain's great interpreters of traditional song".

== Early life ==
Ray Galbraith Fisher was born on 26 November 1940 at Redlands Hospital, Glasgow, the second of six daughters and third of seven children of John Fisher, a police inspector, and his wife, Morag Fisher (born Marion Macdonald). Her father sang as a soloist in the City of Glasgow police choir, and her mother sang in Scots Gaelic.

She was educated at Hyndland Secondary School, as was her brother Archie, and it was where she met Hamish Imlach, followed by Jordanhill Teacher Training College.

== Career ==
Fisher began in the 1950s with a skiffle group alongside her brother Archie, before they became a folk duo, Ray and Archie Fisher. They were regulars at Norman Buchan's Glasgow Ballads Club, and it was through Buchan and his wife Janie, that Ray met Jeannie Robertson, who invited her to stay in Aberdeen, where she then spent six weeks learning about traditional Scottish folk songs.

Ray and Archie later formed a trio, The Wayfarers, with singer/fiddler Bobby Campbell, and the Fisher Family, with their parents, their younger sister Cilla, and later Cilla's husband Artie Trezise. Ray and Archie both also had solo careers.

She was a familiar face on television music programmes, and appeared on BBC's Jools' Annual Hootenanny and STV's Here and Now.

Fisher released three solo albums, The Bonny Birdie (1972), Willie's Lady (1982), and Traditional Songs of Scotland (1991).

== Personal life ==
On 3 September 1962, Fisher married Colin Ross (1934–2019), a schoolteacher, fiddler and Northumbrian piper, and they had three children: Andrew (born 1964), Duncan (born 1963) and Fiona (born 1966).

She died from cancer on 31 August 2011 in North Shields, Tyne and Wear, aged 70.

== Discography ==
Solo albums

- The Bonny Birdy, Trailer, 1972
- Willie's Lady, Folk-Legacy Records, 1982
- Traditional Songs Of Scotland, Saydisc, 1991

Further tracks appear on-

- The Iron Muse (A Panorama Of Industrial Folk Music), Topic Records, 1963
- On The Edge (A Radio Ballad), Argo, 1970
- Vesdun - 1er Festival De Musique Traditionnelle, Prodisc Strasbourg, 1973
- All Through The Year - A Calender In Music & Song, Hypertension Music, 1991
- Scottish Women, Greentrax, 2004

Recording as 'Ray and Archie Fisher'

Far Over The Forth (7" EP), Topic Records, 1961

Further tracks appear on-

- Edinburgh Folk Festival Vol 1, Decca, 1963
- Edinburgh Folk Festival Vol 2, Decca, 1964
- Folk Festival - Festival Folk, Waverley, 1964
- The Hoot'nanny Show - Vol. 1, Waverley, 1964
- The Hoot'nanny Show - Vol. 2, Waverley, 1964
- Edinburgh Students Charities Appeal, Private Press, 1965

With 'The Fisher Family'

- Traditional & New Songs From Scotland, Topic Records, 1966
