= Oldham Tinkers =

British group of singers, formed in 1965

The Oldham Tinkers are an English folk music band, formed in 1965 by John Howarth and brothers Larry and Gerry Kearns in a pub in Oldham, Greater Manchester, England. They sing in Lancashire vernacular with subjects ranging from childhood, music hall, to poetry and historical subjects, mainly about Oldham and surrounding parts of southern Lancashire.

== Members ==
Larry Kearns died in June 2016. but David Howard has taken his place for the performances they continue to give.

== Discography ==
Their work is published by Topic Records, initially with various other artists, Deep Lancashire (1968) and Owdham Edge (1970), but subsequently by themselves on:

- Oldham's Burning Sands (1971)
- Best o't Bunch (1974)
- For Old Time's Sake (1975)
- Sit Thee Down (1977)
- That Lancashire Band (1979)
- An Introduction to The Oldham Tinkers (2018)
- A Lancashire Grace (2021)

Their songs also contributed to the Topic Records anniversary compilations:

- Three Score & Ten (2009)
- Vision & Revision (2019)

Their song Peterloo about the eponymous massacre was also included on the Ozit Records CD:

- Chris Hewitt and the late John Peel Present Peterloo (2010)

They recorded various radio sessions for the BBC from 1969.
