= Here We Come A-wassailing =

Traditional English song

"Here We Come A-wassailing"
Performed by the U.S. Army Band Chorus.

"Here We Come A-wassailing" (or "Here We Come A-Caroling"), also known as "Here We Come A-Christmasing", "Wassail Song" and by many other names, is a traditional English Christmas carol and New Year song, typically sung whilst wassailing, or singing carols, wishing good health and exchanging gifts door to door. It is listed as number 209 in the Roud Folk Song Index. "Gower Wassail" and "Gloucestershire Wassail" are similar wassailing songs.

== History and context ==
The song dates from at least the mid 19th century, but is probably much older. The a- in "a-wassailing" is an archaic intensifying prefix; compare "A-Hunting We Will Go" and lyrics to "The Twelve Days of Christmas" (e.g., "Six geese a-laying").

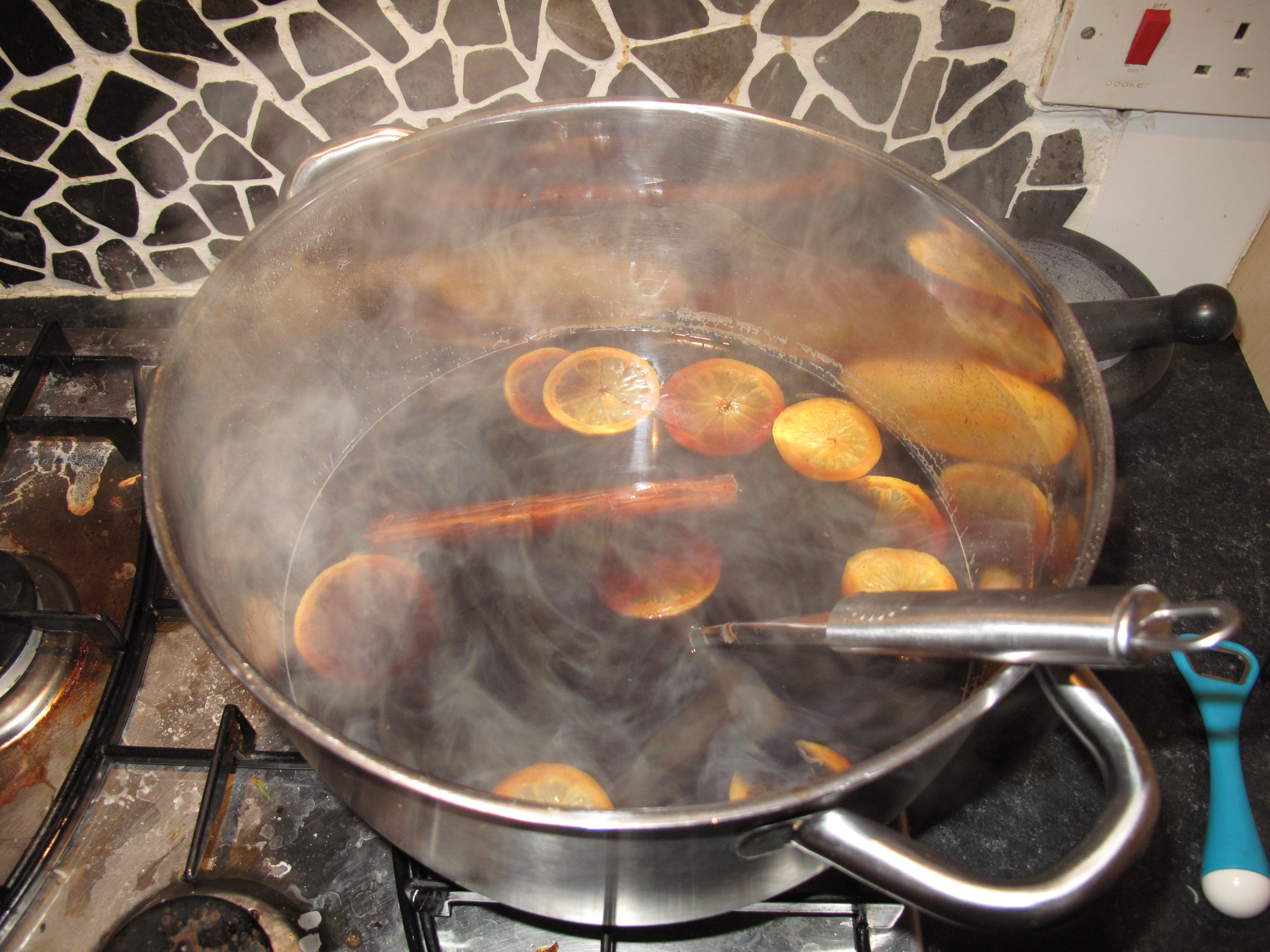
Wassail punch

According to Reader's Digest, "the Christmas spirit often made the rich a little more generous than usual, and bands of beggars and orphans used to dance their way through the snowy streets of England, offering to sing good cheer and to tell good fortune if the householder would give them a drink from his wassail bowl or a penny or a pork pie or, let them stand for a few minutes beside the warmth of his hearth. The wassail bowl itself was a hearty combination of hot ale or beer, apples, spices and mead, just alcoholic enough to warm tingling toes and fingers of the singers."

== Variants ==
In 1949, the Welsh folk singer Phil Tanner sang a minor-key variant called "Wassail Song" and generally known as "Gower Wassail", which was popularised by various folk revival groups.

A variant is "Here We Come A-Christmasing". It replaces the word wassail with Christmas.

There are also other variants (often, but not always, sung by Americans), wherein the first verse is sung "Here we come a-caroling" and it is titled so. Often in this version, the third verse (directly after the first refrain [see lyrics]) is removed, along with the refrain that follows it, but this depends on which version is being used. This version also often has the second line of the chorus "And a merry Christmas too" or "And to you glad tidings too", instead of "And to you your wassail too". There were other different satirical variants used on the 1987 Christmas special A Claymation Christmas Celebration. Another variant is entitled "We've Been a While-A-Wandering" and "Yorkshire Wassail Song".

== Traditional collected versions ==
Hundreds of versions of wassailing songs have been collected, including dozens of variants collected by Cecil Sharp from the 1900s to the 1920s, mostly in the south of England. Many of the traditional versions that have been collected and recorded are not of the "Here We Come A-wassailing" variant; the following examples are similar to the now famous version:

- Emily Bishop of Bromsberrow Heath, Gloucestershire (1952)
- Dorothy Davey of Hull, Yorkshire (1969), available on the British Library Sound Archive website.
- George Dunn of Quarry Bank, Staffordshire (1971), available online via the Vaughan Williams Memorial Library
- Frank Hinchliffe of Sheffield, Yorkshire (1976)

The song appears to have travelled to the United States with English settlers, where it has been found several times in the Appalachian region, and recorded twice:

- Edith Fitzpatrick James of Ashland, Kentucky (1934)
- Jean Ritchie of Viper, Kentucky (1949), available online as part of the Alan Lomax archive.

== Lyrics ==
As with most carols, there are several related versions of the words. One version is presented below, based on the text given in The New Oxford Book of Carols. The verses are sung in 6/8 time, while the chorus switches to common time.

1. Here we come a-wassailing
Among the leaves so green;
here we come a-wand'ring
so fair to be seen.

Refrain:
Love and joy come to you,
and to you your wassail too;
and God bless you and send you a happy New Year,
and God send you a happy New Year.

2. Our wassail cup is made
of the rosemary tree,
and so is your beer
of the best barley.
Refrain

3. We are not daily beggars
that beg from door to door;
but we are neighbours' children,
whom you have seen before.
Refrain

4. Call up the butler of this house,
put on his golden ring.
Let him bring us up a glass of beer,
and better we shall sing.
Refrain

5. We have got a little purse
of stretching leather skin;
we want a little of your money
to line it well within.
Refrain

6. Bring us out a table
and spread it with a cloth;
bring us out a mouldy cheese,
and some of your Christmas loaf.
Refrain

7. God bless the master of this house
likewise the mistress too,
and all the little children
that round the table go.
Refrain

8. Good master and good mistress,
while you're sitting by the fire,
pray think of us poor children
who are wandering in the mire.
Refrain
