= Wassail =

Hot mulled cider, ale or wine

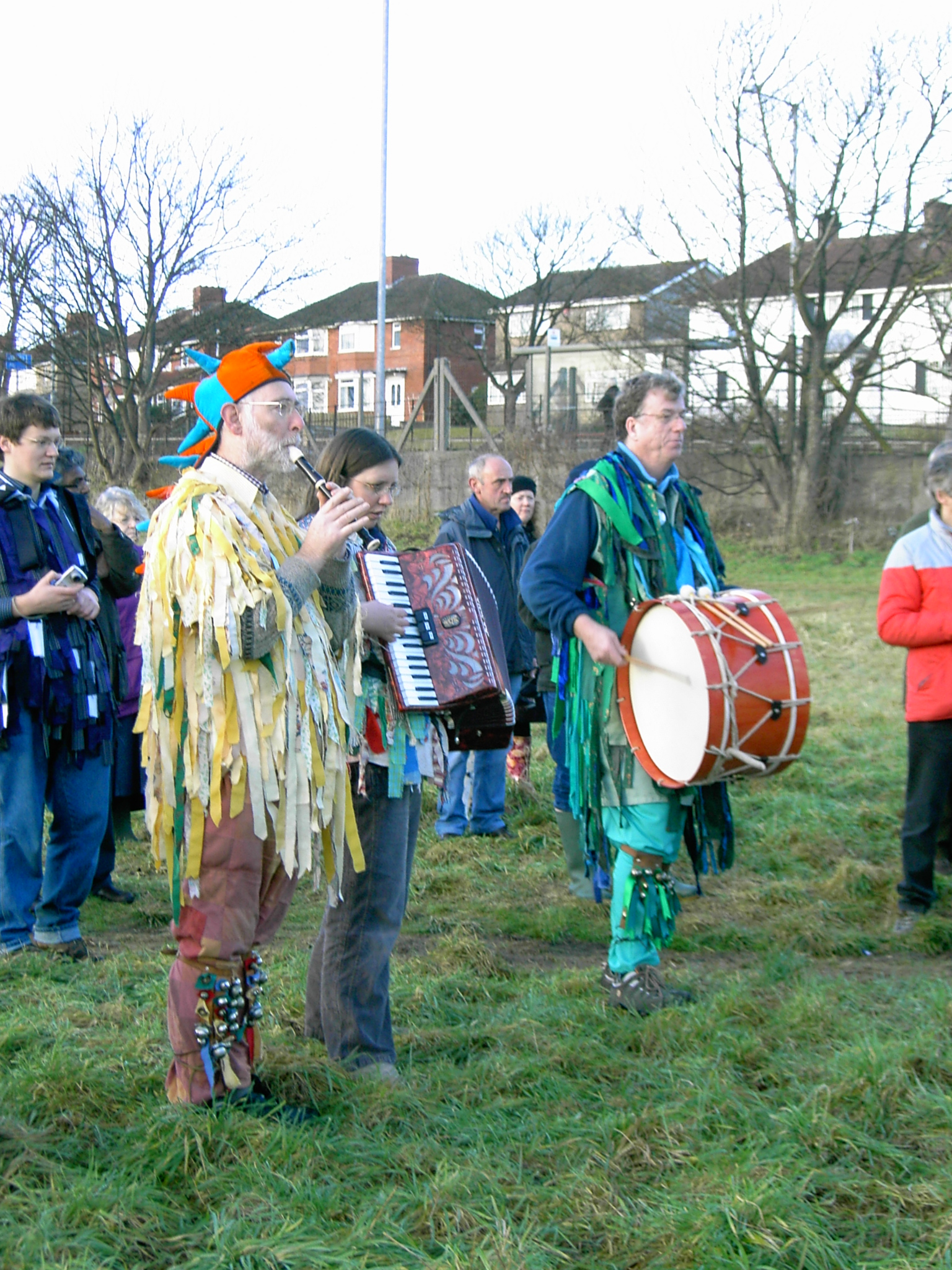
Wassailers in Shirehampton, Bristol

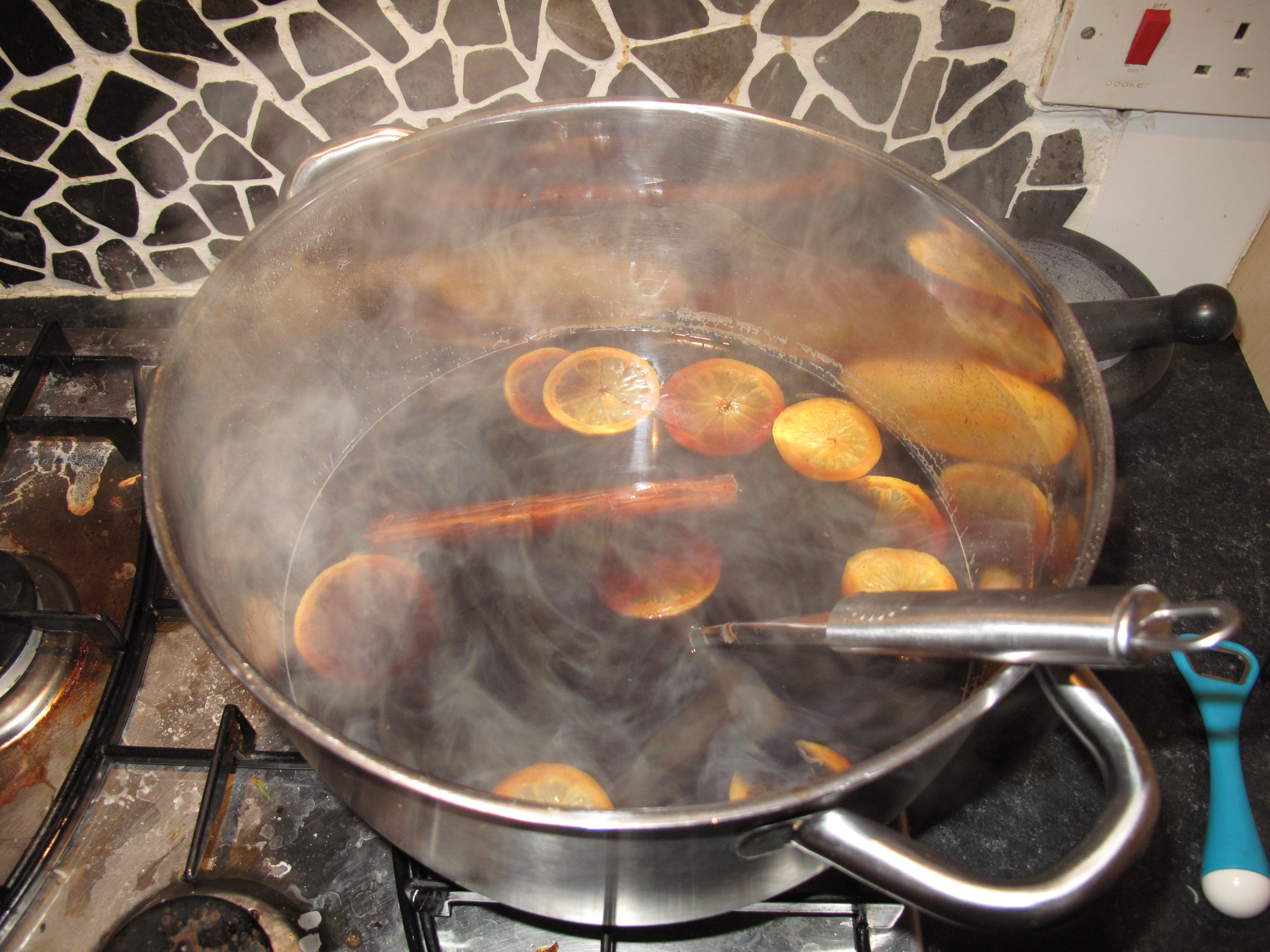
A pot of simmering wassail, infused with citrus fruit slices and cinnamon sticks

The tradition of wassailing (also spelled wasselling) falls into two distinct categories: the house-visiting wassail and the orchard-visiting wassail. The house-visiting wassail, which traditionally occurs on the twelfth day of Christmastide known as Twelfth Night or Epiphany Eve (5 January), is the practice of people going door-to-door, singing and offering a drink from the wassail bowl in exchange for gifts; this practice still exists, but has largely been displaced by carol singing. The orchard-visiting wassail is the custom of visiting orchards in cider-producing regions of England and singing to the trees to promote a good harvest for the coming year. Notable traditional wassailing songs include "Here We Come a-Wassailing", "Gloucestershire Wassail", and "Gower Wassail".

Wassail (/ˈwɒsəl/, /-eɪl/ WOSS-əl, -ayl) is also a beverage made from hot mulled cider, ale, or wine and spices, drunk traditionally as an integral part of wassailing.

== Etymology ==
According to the Oxford English Dictionary, the word "wassail" originated as a borrowing from the Old Norse salutation ves heill, corresponding to Old English hál wes þú or wes hál – literally meaning 'be in good health' or 'be fortunate'. It was initially used in the sense of 'hail' or 'farewell', without any drinking connotation. The English interjection "hail" is a cognate of the etymon of the second part of "wassail", and was probably influenced by the Old English phrase.

The expression later became part of the drinking formula "wassail ... drinkhail" which, the OED suggests, initially arose in England among the Anglo-Danes, and from there spread to the native population, being considered a specifically Anglo Saxon characteristic by the 12th century. The earliest record is of around 1140, in Geoffrey of Monmouth's telling of the Rowena story, which has wes heil ... drinc heil (or, in a variant reading, was heil). Later Middle English manuscripts have a variety of spellings, including wæs hæil, wæshail, wessail, washayl, washail, wesseyl, wassayl, wassaile, wassaylle, wessayle, whatsaile and whatsaill.

The second expression, "drinkhail", may derive either from Old Norse or Old English, again with a variety of spellings including drinkel, drincheheil, drechehel, drincheheil, drinceseil, drinqueheil, drinkeil and dringail.

The earliest example of the drinking phrases in a specifically English context comes from a manuscript of 1275, preserving a 12th-century text which has Old English: Þat freond sæiðe to freonde...Leofue freond wæs hail Þe oðer sæið Drinc hail. [That friend said to [the other] friend..., "beloved friend, wassail!"; the other said, "drinkhail!"]

By c. 1300, the sense had extended from a toast to the drink itself, especially to the spiced ale used in Twelfth-night and Christmas Eve celebrations. By 1598 it was being applied to the custom of drinking healths on those nights. Shakespeare's 1603 use of "Keep wassel" in Hamlet i. iv. 10 was the first record of the term's use in a more general sense of "carousal" or "revelling".

== Wassailing ==
"Here we come a-wassailing" performed by the U.S. Army Band

Here's to thee, old apple tree,
That blooms well, bears well.
Hats full, caps full,
Three bushel bags full,
An' all under one tree. Hurrah! Hurrah!

Here's to thee, old apple-tree,
Whence thou mayst bud, and whence thou mayst blow,
And whence thou mayst bear apples enow! [enough]
Hats-full! Caps-full!
Bushel, bushel sacks-full!
And my pockets full, too! Hurra!

In the cider-producing counties in the South West of England (primarily Cornwall, Devon, Somerset, Dorset, Gloucestershire, and Herefordshire) or South East England (Kent, Sussex, Essex, and Suffolk), as well as Jersey, wassailing refers to a traditional ceremony that involves singing and drinking to the health of trees on Twelfth Night in the hopes that they might better thrive. In the context of Christian Christmas celebrations, wassailing involves pronouncing a blessing on a tree so that it will bear fruit, often through the singing of a hymn. The purpose of wassailing is to awaken the cider apple trees and to scare away evil spirits to ensure a good harvest of fruit in the Autumn. The ceremonies of each wassail vary from village to village but they generally all have the same core elements. In Dartmoor today, the Ashburton and Moorland Mission Community gathers in the barn at Newcombe Farm to sing Wassailing songs and pray for God's blessing on the New Year.

A folktale from Somerset reflecting this custom tells of the Apple Tree Man, the spirit of the oldest apple tree in an orchard, and in whom the fertility of the orchard is thought to reside. In the tale a man offers his last mug of mulled cider to the trees in his orchard and is rewarded by the Apple Tree Man who reveals to him the location of buried gold.

=== Wassailing during Christmastide ===
Traditionally, the wassail is celebrated on the twelfth day of Christmastide, known as Twelfth Night or Epiphany Eve, being the day prior to the Epiphany. In the liturgical calendars of Western Christianity, including those of the Lutheran, Anglican and Roman Catholic denominations, Twelfth Night falls on 5 January. Some people still wassail on "Old Twelvey Night", 17 January, as it would have been before the introduction of the Gregorian Calendar in 1752.

In the Middle Ages, the wassail was a reciprocal exchange between the feudal lords and their peasants as a form of recipient-initiated charitable giving, to be distinguished from begging. This point is made in the song "Here We Come A-wassailing", when the wassailers inform the lord of the house that

we are not daily beggars that beg from door to door
But we are friendly neighbours whom you have seen before.

The lord of the manor would give food and drink to the peasants in exchange for their blessing and goodwill, i.e.

Love and joy come to you,
And to you your wassail too;
And God bless you and send you
a Happy New Year

This would be given in the form of the song being sung. Wassailing is the background practice against which an English carol such as "We Wish You a Merry Christmas" can be made sense of. The carol lies in the English tradition where wealthy people of the community gave Christmas treats to the carol singers on Christmas Eve such as 'figgy puddings'. In Dartmoor today, the Ashburton and Moorland Mission Community gathers in the barn at Newcombe Farm to sing Wassailing songs and pray for God’s blessing on the New Year.

Although wassailing is often described in innocuous and sometimes nostalgic terms—still practised in some parts of Scotland and Northern England on New Years Day as "first-footing"—the practice in England has not always been considered so innocent. Similar traditions have also been traced to Greece and the country of Georgia. Wassailing was associated with rowdy bands of young men who would enter the homes of wealthy neighbours and demand free food and drink (in a manner similar to the modern children's Halloween practice of trick-or-treating). If the householder refused, he was usually cursed, and occasionally his house was vandalized. The example of the exchange is seen in their demand for "figgy pudding" and "good cheer", i.e., the wassail beverage, without which the wassailers in the song will not leave; "We won't go until we get some, so bring some out here". Such complaints were also common in the early days of the United States, where the practice (and its negative connotations) had taken root by the early 1800s; it led to efforts from the American merchant class to promote a more sanitized Christmas.

=== The Orchard-visiting Wassail ===
In the cider-producing West of England (primarily the counties of Devon, Somerset, Dorset, Gloucestershire and Herefordshire) wassailing also refers to drinking (and singing) the health of trees in the hopes that they might better thrive. Wassailing is also a traditional event in Jersey, Channel Islands where cider (cidre) made up the bulk of the economy before the 20th century. The format is much the same as that in England but with terms and songs often in Jèrriais.

17th-century English lyric poet Robert Herrick writes in his poem "Another (To The Maids)" (also known by the first line as "Wassail The Trees"):

Wassail the trees, that they may bear
You many a plum and many a pear:
For more or less fruits they will bring,
As you do give them wassailing.

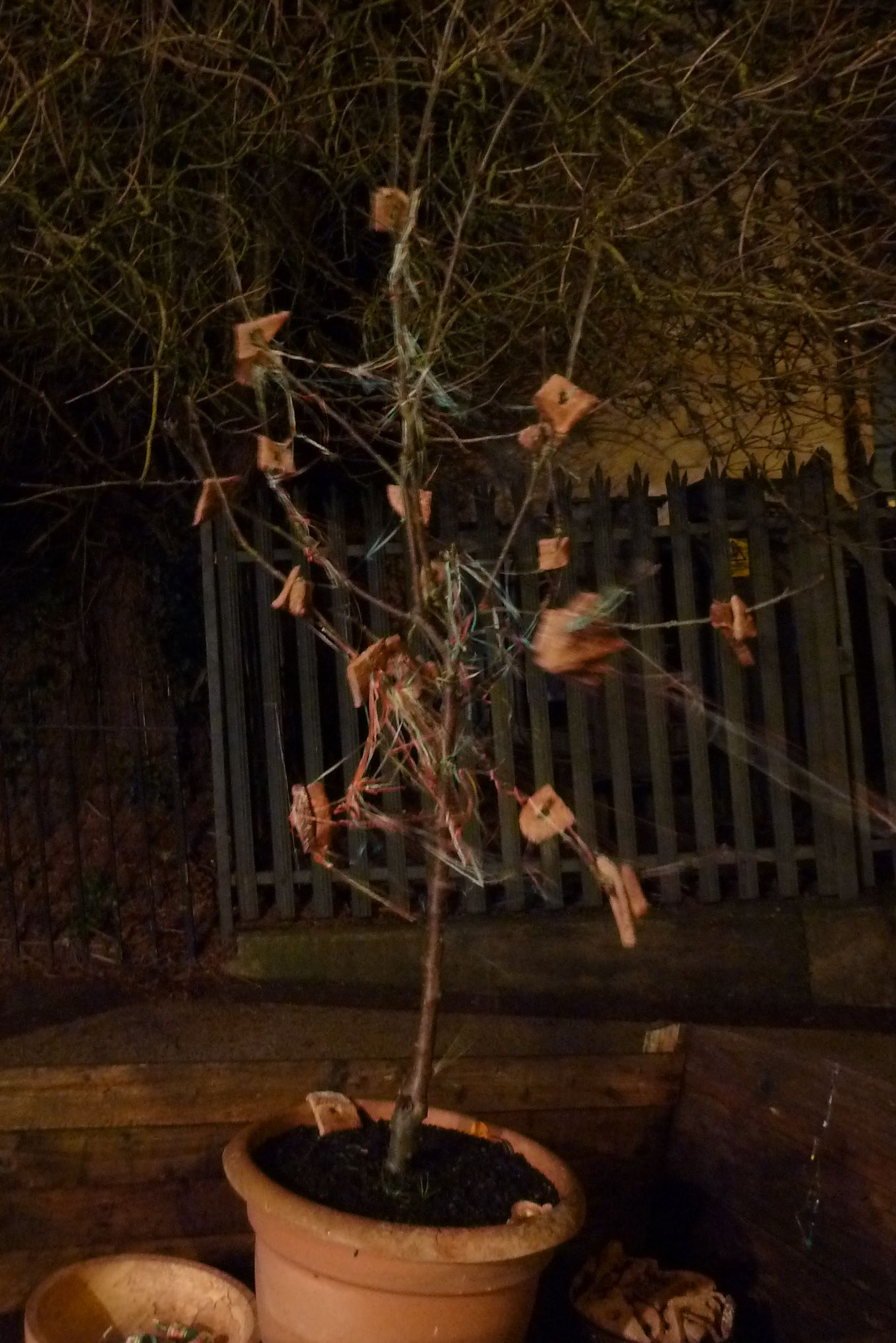
An apple sapling, hung with toast, placed in a handcart and pushed around the streets during the Chepstow Mari Lwyd, 2014

The purpose of wassailing is to awake the cider apple trees and to scare away evil spirits to ensure a good harvest of fruit in autumn. The ceremonies of each wassail vary from village to village but they generally all have the same core elements. While wassailing, a hymn is usually recited, such as:

Old apple tree, we wassail thee,
And hoping thou wilt bear:
For the Lord doth know where we shall be
Till apples come another year.
To bloom well, and to bear well,
So merry let us be:
Let every man take off his hat,
And shout to the old apple tree:
Old apple tree, we wassail thee,
And hoping thou wilt bear,
Hatfuls, capfuls and three bushel bagfulls
And a little heap under the stairs.

— Wassail Song,

This incantation is followed by noise-making from the assembled crowd until the gunsmen give a final volley through the branches. The crowd then moves onto the next orchard. In the context of Christian observance, wassailing involves pronouncing a blessing on a tree so that it will bear fruit, often through the singing of a hymn.

As the largest cider producing region of the country, the West Country hosts historic wassails annually, such as Whimple in Devon and Carhampton in Somerset, both on 17 January, or old Twelfth Night. Many new, commercial or "revival" wassails have also been introduced throughout the West Country, such as those in Stoke Gabriel and Sandford, Devon. Clevedon in North Somerset holds an annual wassailing event at the Clevedon Community Orchard, combining the traditional elements of the festival with the entertainment and music of the Bristol Morris Men.

Nineteenth-century wassailers of Somerset would sing the following lyrics after drinking the cider until they were "merry and gay":

Apple tree, apple tree, we all come to wassail thee,
Bear this year and next year to bloom and to blow,
Hat fulls, cap fulls, three cornered sack fills,
Hip, Hip, Hip, hurrah,
Holler biys, holler hurrah.

—

A folktale from Somerset reflecting this custom tells of the Apple Tree Man, the spirit of the oldest apple tree in an orchard, and in whom the fertility of the orchard is thought to reside. In the tale a man offers his last mug of mulled cider to the trees in his orchard and is rewarded by the Apple Tree Man who reveals to him the location of buried gold.

== Preparation of the beverage ==
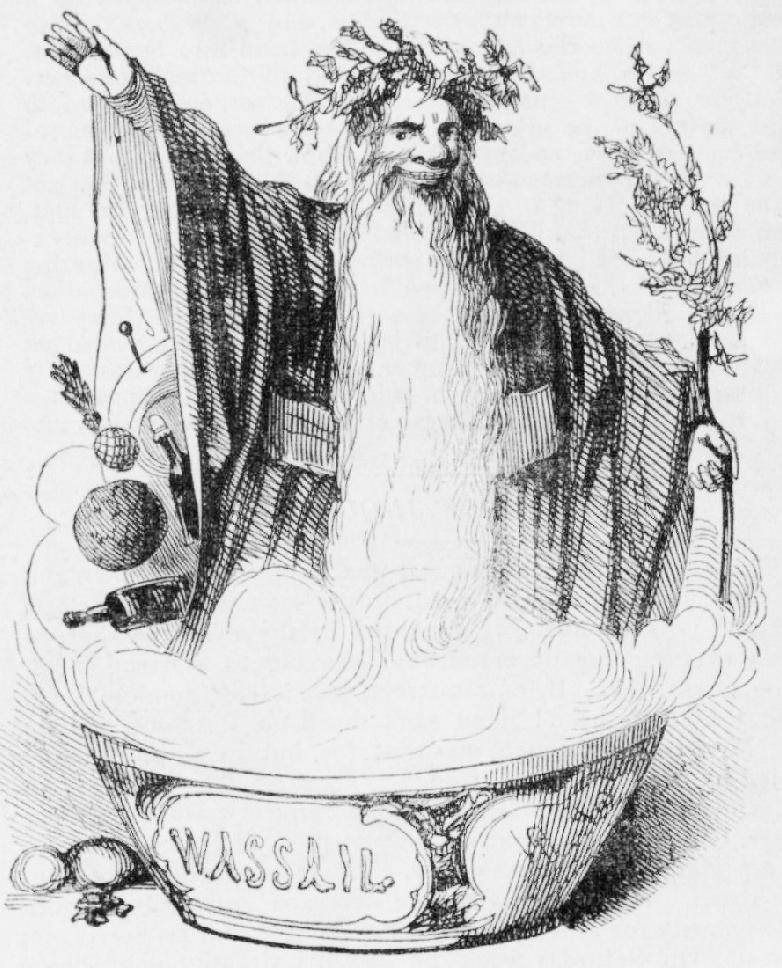
A Christmas Eve 1842 issue of the Illustrated London News, depicting Father Christmas in a wassail bowl

Wassail is a hot, mulled punch often associated with Christmastide, often drunk from a wassail bowl. The earliest versions were warmed mead into which roasted crab apples were dropped and burst to create a drink called 'lambswool' drunk on Lammas day, still known in Shakespeare's time. Later, the drink evolved to become a mulled cider made with sugar, cinnamon, ginger and nutmeg, topped with slices of toast as sops and drunk from a large communal bowl. Modern recipes begin with a base of wine, fruit juice or mulled ale, sometimes with brandy or sherry added. Apples or oranges are often added to the mix, and some recipes also call for beaten eggs to be tempered into the drink. Great bowls turned from wood, pottery or tin often had many handles for shared drinking and highly decorated lids; antique examples can still be found in traditional pubs. Hence the first stanza of the traditional carol Gloucestershire Wassail; variations of which were known to have been sung as far back as the 1700s, and possibly earlier:

Wassail! Wassail! All over the town,
Our toast it is white and our ale it is brown;
Our bowl it is made of the white maple tree;
With the wassailing bowl, we'll drink unto thee.

At Carhampton, near Minehead, the Apple Orchard Wassailing is held on Old Twelfth Night (17 January). The villagers form a circle around the largest apple tree, hang pieces of toast soaked in cider in the branches for the robins, who represent the 'good spirits' of the tree. A shotgun is fired overhead to scare away evil spirits, and the group sings the following being the (last verse):

Old Apple tree, old apple tree;
We've come to wassail thee;
To bear and to bow apples enow;
Hats full, caps full, three bushel bags full;
Barn floors full and a little heap under the stairs.

=== Lamb's wool ===
"Lamb's wool" or "lambswool" is an early variety of wassail, brewed from ale or mead, baked apples, sugar and various spices.

Next crowne the bowle full of
With gentle Lambs wooll [sic],
Adde sugar, nutmeg, and ginger,
With store of ale too,
And thus ye must doe,
To make the Wassaile a swinger.

— Richard Cook, Oxford Night Caps, 1835

British-Irish antiquarian Charles Vallancey proposed that the term "lambswool" is a corruption of the name of a pagan Irish festival, "Lamas Ubhal", during which a similar drink was had. Alternatively, the name may derive from the drink's similar appearance to the wool of lambs, from the froth created by the boiling apple pulp. Ale is occasionally replaced by ginger ale for children, especially around Halloween and New Year.

Lambswool is first recorded as the name of this drink in 1593 and may be referenced in lines spoken by Puck in A Midsummer Night's Dream.

== Wassail bowls ==
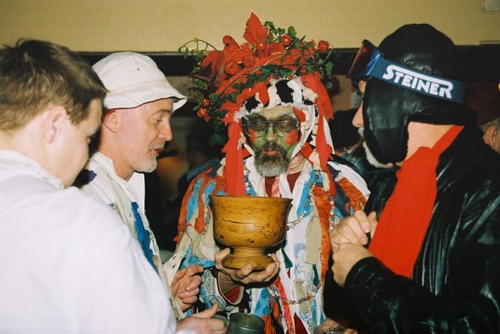
Sharing the wassail bowl

Wassail bowls, generally in the shape of goblets, have been preserved. The Worshipful Company of Grocers made a very elaborate one in the seventeenth century, decorated with silver. It is so large that it must have passed around as a "loving cup" so that many members of the guild could drink from it.

In the English Christmas carol "Gloucestershire Wassail", the singers tell that their "bowl is made of the white maple tree, with a wassailing bowl we'll drink to thee". As white maple does not grow natively in Europe, the lyric may be a reference to sycamore maple or field maple, both of which do, and both of which have white-looking wood. This is reinforced by an 1890s written account from a man describing the wassailing bowl of his friend from Gloucestershire:

The bowl was one of those wooden sycamore or maple ones used to hold boiled potatoes on a farm kitchen table.

Alternatively however, many formal publications from the 1800s list the lyric simply as saying "maplin tree", without mentioning "white". Additionally, the lyric appears to have varied significantly depending on location and other factors, calling into question how literal the term was and/or how varied the construction of wassail bowls was. For example, a 1913 publication by Ralph Vaughan Williams, who had recorded the lyric in 1909 by a wassailer in Herefordshire, recorded it as "green maple". Another version from Brockweir listed the bowl as being made from mulberry.

== Popular culture ==
=== Modern music ===
British folk rock band Steeleye Span opened their third album Ten Man Mop, or Mr. Reservoir Butler Rides Again (1971) with an extended, minor-key version of "Gower Wassail", Tim Hart singing the traditional verses and the others joining the chorus.

The British rock band Blur released a song titled "The Wassailing Song", with each member taking a verse. The release was limited to 500 7-inch pressings, given out at a concert in 1992. The version of "The Wassailing Song" performed by Blur was later adapted in a recording by The Grizzly Folk, who have stated that the arrangement bears a close resemblance to the "Gloucestershire Wassail".

In her song "Oh England My Lionheart", on the 1978 album Lionheart, Kate Bush sings, "Give me one wish, and I'd be wassailing in the orchard, my English rose."

The alternative rock band Half Man Half Biscuit from Tranmere, included a song named "Uffington Wassail" on their 2000 album Trouble over Bridgwater. With its references to the Israeli Eurovision contestant Dana International, the Sealed Knot English Civil War re-enactment society, and also to the skier Vreni Schneider, the meaning of the song's title in this context is a little obscure.

In 2013 Folk Rock musician Wojtek Godzisz created an arrangement of the traditional Gloucestershire Wassail words with original music for the Pentacle Drummers' first Annual Wassail festival (2013), called "Wassail".

For the Pentacle Drummers' second Wassail festival (2014), the pagan rock band Roxircle also wrote a Wassail song especially for the event called "Wassail (Give Thanks to the Earth)". The Pentacle Drummers encourage their headline acts to write a song centered around wassailing, a way to keep the tradition alive.

The English progressive rock band Big Big Train released an EP entitled "Wassail" in 2015, named for the title track.

Yorkshire-based folk singer Kate Rusby included the track "Cornish Wassail" on her 2015 album, The Frost Is All Over.

Australia-based band Spiral Dance included the track "Earth Wassail" on their 2002 album "Notes of Being", based on the Gower Wassail song.

=== Television ===
Wassail was mentioned in the television show Mystery Science Theater 3000. Crow T. Robot and Tom Servo ask Mike Nelson to provide some. When asked to explain further what exactly wassail is, they admit to having no idea. However, they offer a guess that it might be an "anti-inflammatory". Upon actually getting some, they describe it as "skunky", discovering it to be a 500-year-old batch.

It was mentioned and explained to Bing Crosby by Frank Sinatra in a special episode of the Frank Sinatra Show entitled "Happy Holidays with Bing and Frank" released 20 December 1957.

In 2004, the alternative Christmas message was presented by The Simpsons who close out with a cup of "traditional British wassail". When the director cuts, they spit it out in disgust, with Bart remarking that it tasted "like hurl".

Wassail was featured on the BBC Two special Oz and Hugh Drink to Christmas, aired in December 2009. Oz Clarke and Hugh Dennis sampled the drink and the wassailing party in Southwest England as part of their challenge to find Britain's best Christmas drinks.

During the episode "We Two Kings" on the NBC sitcom Frasier, the title character's brother Niles asks to borrow his wassail bowl; when Frasier's father Martin asks why they can't just use a punch bowl, Niles retorts, "Then it wouldn't be Wassail then would it?" In response, Martin looks up 'wassail' in the dictionary, defined as 'a Christmas punch'.

In the Good Eats holiday special episode "The Night Before Good Eats", Alton Brown is given a wassail recipe by Saint Nicholas which he then must make to appease a mob of angry carolers.

In Will Vinton's Claymation Christmas Celebration, which originally aired 21 December 1987, the main characters of the special Rex and Herb talk about the term "wassail" regarding a specific Christmas carol, which is comically mis-sung by varying groups that show up throughout the show.

== See also ==
- Apple Day
- Apple Wassail
- First-foot
- Here We Come A-wassailing
- Jasličkári
- Koliada
- Koledari
- List of hot beverages
- List of Christmas carols
- Mari Lwyd (a related tradition in Wales)
- Mummers' play
- Julebukking, Scandinavia
- Parranda
- Star singers
- Wish tree
- Yule goat
- Polaznik

== Bibliography ==
- Bladey, Conrad Jay (2002). Do the Wassail: A Short Guide to Wassail, Songs, Customs, Recipes and Traditions: How to Have a Fine Geegaw of a Wassail!, Hutman Productions, ISBN 0-9702386-7-3.
- Gayre, Robert (1948). Wassail! In Mazers of Mead: an account of mead, metheglin, sack and other ancient liquors, and of the mazer cups out of which they were drunk, with some comment upon the drinking customs of our forebears, Phillimore & Co. Ltd., London.
- Oxford English Dictionary
- Merriam-Webster Online Dictionary "Wassail."
- "Wassail Bowl". Birmingham Museums & Art Gallery. Archived from the original on 27 September 2007.
- "Reminiscences of Life" in the parish of Street, Somersetshire dated 1909 at pages 25–26 written by an "old inhabitant" William Pursey of Street 1836-1919. This is the art of wassail.
