= Cyril Gwynn =

British poet

Cyril Gwynn (1897–1988) was a British poet, from Gower, in the City and County of Swansea. He was known as the Bard of Gower, and became a household name in Gower before leaving for Australia. His poetry was spoken rather than written, and was in the English language, using the Gower dialect.

== Life ==
Arthur Cyril Gwynn, known as Cyril Gwynn, was born on 19 January 1897 in Briton Ferry, Carmarthenshire. His father was a Gower farmer called Arthur Gwynn, and his mother, Caroline, came from Briton Ferry, where her father worked as a ship's pilot. Cyril grew up in Gower on his grandfather's farm in Newton, and at a farm tenanted by his parents at Langland; he also spent time on his aunt's farm at Southgate. He went to school in Newton and Mumbles and it was at school that he began to make up rhymes. His first work dealt with the football team and the Oystermouth fishermen.

In 1906, when their Langland farm was sold to be developed for the Langland golf course, the Gwynn family took over a butcher's shop in Southend, and Cyril helped with deliveries; the shop failed and his parents lost everything.

The Gwynn family then moved to Llanrhidian and Newton, as farm workers, and then to Morriston, Swansea, where the older boys found jobs in government factories.

During the First World War, Cyril served on mine-sweepers.

In 1922 he joined the United States mercantile marine and was shipwrecked off the coast of Africa. He then worked on an oil tanker along the east coast of America, travelling as far south as Mexico. He married Winifred May Tucker of Parkmill in 1922, and they had seven children.

He attended a politics course at Ashridge College, Hertfordshire, and there he met Randolph Churchill and Lennox-Boyd, the unsuccessful Conservative Party candidate for Gower. He became Lennox-Boyd's political agent and considered a political career, but soon abandoned the idea. He was then offered a job at the Western Mail newspaper, but turned this down.

After moving nine times, he bought the 52 acres (210,000 m^{2}) Hills Farm, in Port Eynon in 1946. He had fulfilled his dream: owning his own farm.

However, in 1950 his wife was suffering from ill-health, so they moved to Three Crosses. It was at this time that Cyril Gwynne, who was now a household name in Gower, and who had lived in six Gower parishes, disappeared from the Gower scene:

“....this remarkable, self-effacing fellow, with his head in the clouds and his roots deep in the soil of Gower, seemed to have effaced himself completely and vanished from the scene. I heard he had gone abroad and, incredibly, never returned".

He had left Gower for Neath Abbey, where he worked as an engineer for 10 years.

At Hills Farm Winnie's health was deteriorating, and the doctor strongly advised a change from their isolated life on the farm. One of Cyril's daughters had emigrated to Australia, and urged her parents to visit for a holiday. In 1964, Cyril and Winnie went for a two-month holiday and stayed for good. They settled in Croydon, Victoria, where they found another close-knit farming community full of interest.

In 1975 Cyril and Winnie Gwynn returned to Gower for a three-month visit, and in 1979, after Winnie had died, Cyril paid another short visit to Gower, before deciding to move into a retirement village in Australia. By 1987, Cyril was in poor health but was looked after by his daughter Dilys, who took him shopping and to the library. Arthur Cyril Gwynn died on 7 January 1988.

== Poetry ==
According to Nigel Jenkins, among older Gower people:

“...it is the name of Cyril Gwynn, and not that of Dylan Thomas, Vernon Watkins or Harri Webb, that comes first to their lips in any talk of poetry. He was, in his day, a Gower celebrity, while remaining entirely unknown outside the area – a state of affairs to be regarded as quite proper, for any notion of Swansea or Cardiff 'recognition' would have struck Cyril as meaningless.'

However, he wrote with "no pretension to literary excellence or grammatical perfection." "Cyril Gwynn was the chronicler of a way of life and a pattern of social relationships that are now gone forever." At the height of his powers, he would go out two or three nights a week, to ploughing match dinners, weddings, wakes, Christmas parties, Court Leet and harvest suppers. He was considered the "Bard of Gower" and was, according to Nigel Jenkins:

“...as near as the Englishry of Wales have come to producing a traditional bard gwlad, that peculiarly Welsh brand of country or folk poet whose function it is to sing his native heath’s praises and to celebrate in verse its communal life".

Cyril could speak the Gower dialect, which was still strong when he was growing up, and it surfaces in his "yarns", although he did not use it in his conversation. His craft was an oral one, and his verses came to him without conscious effort. Most of his work deals with farming, the opening of a new road, the death of a respected member of the community, the arrival of a new vicar, and country craft skills. His working method was based on contemplation, rather than study. If he knew he was to be expected to "take a corner" at an event and recite, he would go to do some work alone in a field, ploughing, or working the horses, and by the end of the day the poem would be there, in his head. After this, he rarely altered a word. Afterwards, he would usually write the poem down, but not always.

The poems were usually based on experience and fact. J. Mansel Thomas noted that he:

"had a phenomenal memory, 'for everything except the price of beef', and I found that even after twelve years away [in Australia], he could still switch without hesitation to any one of a hundred or so of his poems, many with over a dozen verses – a gift that reminds one of another rural genius of Gower – Phil Tanner. He couldn’t recall, however, whether he had written them all down".

Cyril Gwynn's poetic form comprises a narrative folk ballad which relies on a strong rhyme to "clinch the last line’s ironic twist" which would often "bring the house down." However, the "language is simple and, with the exception of his conventional hymns to nature, eschews the 'poetic'" To quote J. Mansel Thomas:

"The sentiments may have been obvious, but the treatment was fresh and amusing, the style uniquely his, with a humour and native wit, often barbed but never lethal, an observation of human nature that was shrewd and true, and a gift for rhythm and rhyme that made it all sound so natural".

Although his house was always "full of books", he limited his reading in poetry so as not to fall too heavily under the influence of other poets, and so lose his spontaneity. He often satirises the verbal pomposities of academics, or the socially pretentious. His poem "Speech" uses a light-hearted approach to deal with the serious problem of using alien speech in a situation where local language will do.

== Vision ==
According to J. Mansel Thomas, Cyril Gwynn has:

“...a special niche in the history of Gower: his verses reflected the lives of the people of Gower before and during a period of fundamental changes..”

Nigel Jenkins writes that Cyril Gwynn's vision is informed by an awareness of the rapid technological and demographic change in a wider world. Gwynn's view is a conservationist one. The town, in this case Swansea, is a place of "noise and riot" where "belching stacks obscure the sky." In 'My Dream', Cyril identifies this as a threat to Gower; resulting in the despoliation of the countryside and the decimation of existing relationships. Life on Gower is harmonious and the threat, in this case one of class, comes from outside the peninsula:

'Twas here I met with Squire Bob,
I knew him by his voice,
Although instead of his bay cob
He drove a big Rolls-Royce'

The conflict in his verse is between Gower people and outsiders; the outsiders' use of pompous language supports their class position and identifies their type. The down-to-earth and apparently "backward" ways of the local people offers a counterpoint. The outsider threatens to undermine local control, but local wit and wisdom win through. The underlying theme is often of an Eden-like idyll under threat:

'The folks I met in Sandy Lane,
I did not know from Adam,
The very road itself was changed,
'Twas faced with tarmacadam.'

But the verse is balanced enough to see through the faults of the locals as well, Gower stinginess being a case in point. Gower people are seen as fallible, but honourable, and contending with nascent forces of globalisation.

== Influences and legacy ==
Cyril Gwynn had a profound influence on the poet Harri Webb, whose Gower family had close ties with the Gwynn family. Speaking of this influence, Harri Webb commented:

“..And he established in my mind an image of the poet as essentially social rather than a solitary character, one moreover, fortunate in his gifts, however humble, and under something of an obligation to spread them around for the pleasure of the people he belongs to, rather than to hoard them in the dark private cellars of introspection and incomprehension".

However, despite critical appreciation, Cyril Gwynn always had doubts about the quality of much of his work. When J. Mansel Thomas suggested to him the possibility of the Gower Society publishing a selected edition of his poems, in 1975:

"The question of his that clinched the matter was a typical one: 'Will my name be on the book?’ he asked, thinking more of his family’s satisfaction than his own".

John Beynon, a farmer, of Kimley Moor Farm, Rhossili was in the audience when Mansel Thomas read Cyril Gwynn's "yarns" at a roadshow in the late 1970s. Beynon went on to write his own yarns and to recite at the Gower Young Farmers Club, harvest suppers and sports club dinners. His yarns were set to his own contemporary verse narratives and were based on true stories, including stories from his grandfather.

Nigel Jenkins believes that the likelihood of the Anglicised areas of Wales providing enough of the conditions needed to seed a community-based poetry are far slimmer now, than in Cyril Gwynn's day. The difference between Cyril and his Welsh language counterparts lies in the lack of cultural context. Cyril Gwynn operated in isolation from the Welsh tradition, lacking the sense of a 'community of bards' that is the inheritance of the Welsh-speaking poet's in y fro Gymraeg, with its bardic contests, nosweithiau lawen and general interest in poetry. However, Cyril Gwynn did compete in the 1937 Gower Eisteddfod where he won first prize for an essay.

Cyril Gwynn's lack of pretension, and the lack of English-language, community-based poetry, in Wales has led to discussion about Cyril Gwynn's title:

"Perhaps 'bard of Gower' sounds a little precious. 'Rhymester' would be too niggardly, 'poet' too lofty, 'entertainer' too disparaging. 'Bard' does give the most just comment on his uncanny gifts and the part they have played in Gower life for nearly forty years".

In 2026, Cyril's great-grandson, Gareth Gwynn, wrote and performed a one-man show called Cyril about researching his family history to give a talk about Cyril Gwynn. It included readings of his poems and anecdotes from his life.

== List of published poems ==
By 1928 Cyril Gwynn had collected enough poems to publish, at his own expense, "Gower Yarns", a collection of 33 of his poems. One-third of these poems were selected by the Gower Society, in 1975, for publication in: "The Gower Yarns of Cyril Gwynn". The idea was suggested by J. Mansel Thomas when Cyril Gwynne made his return visit to Gower, in 1975, at the age of 80. Below is a list of poems from the Gower Society publication:

Contentment; The Widow's Reply; Heavy Cropping; Two of a Kind; The Jobbing Gardener's Complaint; The Kittle Hill Scheme (1927); A Modern Samual; When Mumbles was "The Mumbles"; A Smart Recruit; Ilston Quarry (1925); The Village Blacksmith; My Dream; A Bard's Dilemma; Versatility; To the Life-Saving Club; Partners; Impressions of Farming: 1) By a City Gent; 2) After hearing Kipling's 'If'; 3) By a Farmer; Pro Tem; Early Birds; Capital; Will the Mill; Reluctant Hero; Farewell and Welcome; Salvation; True to Type; Shades of John Peel (1939); Farming – Ancient and Modern; What's in a Name?; A Cosy Yarn; A Dark Horse; Dawn in a Gower Valley;

== Publications ==
- "Gower Yarns", published by Cyril Gwynn (1928)
- "The Gower Yarns of Cyril Gwynn" (1975. Gower Society)
