= English folk music (1900–1949) =

== Births and deaths ==
=== Births ===
- Stan Hugill (1906–1992)
- A.L. Lloyd (1908–1982)
- Copper Family (c. 1912 – 1915)
- Phoebe Smith (1913)
- Walter Pardon (1914–1996)
- Ewan MacColl (1915–1989)
- Fred Jordan (1922–2002)
- Shirley Collins (1935)
- Martin Carthy (1941)
- Dave Swarbrick (1941)
- Bert Jansch (1943)
- Peter Bellamy (1944–1991)
- Ralph McTell (1944)
- John Renbourn (1944)
- Ashley Hutchings (1945)
- June Tabor (1947)
- Maddy Prior (1947)
- Sandy Denny (1947–1978)
- Richard Thompson (1949)

== Collections of songs or music ==
- 1905: Songs of the West (2nd ed) by Sabine Baring-Gould (1834–1924)
- 1907: English Folk Song: Some Conclusions by Cecil Sharp (1859–1924)
- 1908: Traditional English Songs by Lucy Broadwood (1858–1929)
- 1913: The Morris Book by Cecil Sharp
- 1913: Sword Dances of Northern England by Cecil Sharp
- 1919: English Folk Songs From the Southern Appalachian by Cecil Sharp
- 1922: The Country Dance Book by Cecil Sharp
- 1923: Folk Songs of the Upper Thames by Alfred Williams
- 1924: The Dance by Cecil Sharp

== Early recordings ==
The dates of early commercial recordings, and the modern reissue albums on which they can be heard

- 1908: Scott Skinner (1843–1927) The Music of Scott Skinner
- 1908: Joseph Taylor (1832 – c. 1908) Unto Brigg Fair
- 1937: Phil Tanner (1862–1950) The Gower Nightingale
