= Gower dialect =

Dialect of English spoken in Wales

- Native to: United Kingdom
- Region: Gower Peninsula
- Language family: Indo-European: Germanic; West Germanic; Ingvaeonic; Anglic; English; British English; Welsh English; Gower dialect
- Writing system: Latin (English alphabet)

Language codes
- ISO 639-3: –
- Glottolog: None

The Gower dialect refers to the older vocabulary or slang of the Gower Peninsula on the south Wales coast. It was Normanised/Anglicised relatively early after the Norman conquest of England. Relatively cut off from the Welsh hinterland, but with coastal links across south Wales and the West Country, the region developed their distinct English dialect which endured to within living memory.

== History ==
The Gower Peninsula was geographically insulated from 'mainland' modern language influences until well into the twentieth century. A number of words and pronunciations were recorded during the nineteenth and twentieth centuries as distinct usages in Gower — many of which might once have been widespread but which had fallen out of use in the developing standard English.

Some Gower words seem to derive from the Welsh language (e.g. pentan), but many more of the words and usages are cognate with English country dialects including those of South Devon, Somerset and Wiltshire.

== Vocabulary ==
- Angletouch - a worm
- Back - iron plate, part of a dredge
- Beader/bidder - person appointed to summon guests to a Gower wedding
- Bellamine - unglazed brown earthenware pitcher (cf Bellarmine)
- Bett - prepared turf used for hedging
- Blonkers - sparks
- Bossey - a calf still running with its mother
- Bubback - scarecrow; dull person
- Bumbagus - the bittern (cf Welsh aderyn y bwn)
- Butt - a small cart
- Caffle - tangle
- Carthen - winnowing sheet
- Casn't - cannot
- Cassaddle - harness piece for a draught horse
- Cavey - humble
- Charnel - box-like space above the fireplace, often used for hanging bacon
- Clavvy/ Clevvy - large oak beam supporting the inner wall of a chimney
- Clever - fine (adj)
- Cliffage - tithe on quarried limestone, payable to the Lord of the Manor
- Cloam - earthenware
- Cratch - haystack
- Culm - small coal used in lime-burning
- Cust - could
- Cuzzening - coaxing
- Dab - a large stone used in playing duckstone
- Deal - a litter (of pigs)
- Dobbin - large mug
- Dowset - Gower dish, similar to 'whitepot' (below)
- Drangway - narrow lane or alleyway
- Drashel - a flail
- Dree - three
- Dreppance - three pence
- Drow - throw
- Dryth - dryness
- Dumbledarry - cockchafer
- Evil - a three pronged dung-fork
- Frawst / froist - a dainty meal (n); frightened/astonished (adj)
- Gake - yawn
- Galeeny - guinea-fowl
- Gambo - a cart; wagon
- Glaster - buttermilk in the churn
- Gloice - a sharp pang of pain
- Gurgins - coarse flour
- Gwain - going
- Hambrack/hamrach - a straw horse-collar (cf 'rach')
- Herring-gutted - lean, skinny
- Holmes - holly
- Inklemaker - busy person
- Ipson - the quantity that can be held in a pair of cupped hands
- Ite - yet
- Jalap - liniment; laxative tonic
- Jorum - large helping of tea or beer
- Keek - to peep
- Keelage - foreshore berthing fee due to the Lord of the Manor
- Keeve - large barrel or vat
- Kerning - ripening; turning sour
- Kersey - cloth woven from fine wool
- Kittlebegs / kittybags - gaiters
- Kyling - sea fishing
- Lake - small stream or brook
- Lancher / Lansher - greensward between holdings in a common field or 'viel'
- Leery - empty
- Lello - a fool; a carefree lad
- Makth - makes
- Mapsant - local saint's feast day celebrations (from Welsh mab - son; sant (holy)
- Mawn - large wicker basket for animal feed
- Melted - broken up, disintegrated
- Mort - pigfat; lard
- Mucka - a rickyard
- Neargar, fargar - nearer, farther
- Nestletrip / nesseltrip - smallest pig in a litter
- Nice - fastidious
- Nipparty / Noppit - perky
- Nummit / Nommit - a simple lunch, e.g. of bread and 'soul', as might be sent to harvesters in the field (? 'noon meat'?)
- Oakey - greased
- Oakwib - cockchafer
- Owlers - wool smugglers
- Pentan - hob (from Welsh pen - head or top, tan - fire)
- Pill - stream
- Pilmy - dusty
- Planche - to make a board floor (cf French plancher - a wooden floor)
- Purty - to turn sulky
- Quapp - to throb
- Quat - to press or flatten
- Raal - real
- Rach - the last sheaf of corn to be harvested (see also 'hamrach')
- Reremouse - the bat (animal)
- Resiant - resident, particularly a person resident in the area but not having a feudal tenancy
- Riff - short wooden stick for sharpening a scythe
- Rining - mooching; scrounging
- Rying - fishing
- Scrabble - to gather up objects hastily
- Shoat - a small wheaten loaf
- Shrid - to trim a hedge
- Slade - land sloping towards the sea
- Soul - cheese or butter, as eaten with bread
- Spleet - (1) a knitting needle (2) a quarryman's bar
- Starved - perished with cold
- Stiping - hobbling a sheep by tying its head to its foreleg with a band of straw
- Tacker - a youngster
- Tite - to overturn
- Towser - a rough apron
- Uddent - wouldn't
- Umman - woman
- Vair - a stoat or weasel
- Vather - father
- Vella - fellow
- Viel/Vile - a field. The name is still used to describe a commonly managed field at Rhossili on Gower, which is farmed in a mediaeval strip field arrangement
- Vitte - clever or smart
- Vorrit - forehead
- V'rall - for all
- Vurriner - foreigner
- Want - a mole (animal)
- Weest - dismal
- Whirret - a slap
- Whitepot - a Gower delicacy of flour, milk & currants baked (cf. Devon dialect whitepot, a sort of bread-and-butter pudding)
- Wimbling - winnowing
- Witches - moths
- Yau - ewe
- Zig - urine
- Zive - scythe
- Zongals/songals - corn gleanings
- Zul/sul - a plough
- Zz'thee knaw - do you know

== Use of the dialect in art ==
Cyril Gwynn was a Gower poet who used the Gower dialect in his poetry.

Phil Tanner was a Gower singer who used the Gower dialect in his songs, including the Gower Wassail.
