= The Grizzly Folk =

Music project

The Grizzly Folk is an ongoing musical project involving journalists Jon Wilks and Richard Lines, multi-instrumentalist Jon Nice, and a group of other musicians who come and go from recording to recordings. It was also the name of a traditional folk music project run by Jon Wilks – a blog on which he explored the traditional songs of the British Isles by interviewing key musicians from the contemporary folk scene.

== The Grizzly Folk (band) ==
The Grizzly Folk was formed in Fukuoka, Japan in 2008, when Jon Nice and Jon Wilks performed British sea shanties to Japanese audiences. As a duo, with the occasional help of other musicians (including Em Kuntze and Dai Evans), they recorded their first two EPs ('5-Weight', 2008; 'Electric Grizzle', 2009) which were ultimately released as a digital-only compilation album, 'Gurning at the Moon' (2013). These recordings were mainly of original songs, although occasionally they would feature traditional songs from the UK. The latter featured their recording of 'The Wassailing Song' (also known as the 'Gloucestershire Wassail'), which is perhaps their most recognized recording.

In 2015, they released their second full-length album, 'Lairy Through the Town', which incorporated the writing and singing talents of Richard Lines, as well as contributions from musicians Stephen Field, Richard Banks and Dave Borgeson.

== Grizzly Folk (blog) ==
In late 2016, Wilks set up a blog called 'Grizzly Folk', intending to explore traditional folk songs via their storylines (hence the tagline, 'Folk songs explored one story at a time'). His interest in traditional British folk music came via the discovery that his grandparents had met and courted at Cecil Sharp House.

Initially wary of trying to explain a genre he didn't fully understand, he decided to use his journalistic experience to interview a series of prominent folk singers, performers and scholars, hoping that by doing so he might be able to communicate their passion for the genre to his audience. Interviewees included Eliza Carthy, Jon Boden, Paul Sartin, Martin Simpson and many more.

By the end of 2017, he had interviewed and documented conversations with over 25 folk luminaries.

The project also saw Wilks explore some of the traditional songs that he discovered, nine of which ended up on an accompanying album, Songs From The Attic. A follow-up album, using the same concept but focusing on traditional, music hall and industrial folk songs from Birmingham, was released in 2018 under the title Midlife. Wilks completed an EP of songs in 2019 (The Trial of Bill Burn Under Martin's Act) before arranging and recording a final collection of Birmingham songs, the Up The Cut album, released in February 2021.

During the course of the project, Wilks also resurrected the Whitchurch Folk Club in the company of Paul Sartin. The club had been popular in the 1970s and 1980s, but had ultimately closed due to a lack of funding. The club relaunched on October 13, 2017, with a performance by the British folk band, Faustus.

The original "Grizzly Folk Blog" closed in November 2018, with its content moved to a new location. Many of the subjects covered and people interviewed have now featured on The Old Songs Podcast, which Wilks launched in January 2020.

In November 2021, the Grizzly Folk Blog was relaunched as Tradfolk.co.
