= Gloucestershire Wassail =

Traditional Christmas song

- by Traditional
- Other name: Wassail! Wassail! All Over the Town; The Wassailing Bowl; Wassail Song
- Genre: Christmas carol
- Text: Traditional
- Language: English
- Based on: Traditional English carol

The Gloucestershire Wassail, also known as "Wassail! Wassail! All Over the Town", "The Wassailing Bowl" and "Wassail Song" (Note: Not to be confused with Here We Come A-wassailing, which is sometimes referred to as "The Wassail Song") is an English Christmas carol from the county of Gloucestershire in England, dating back to at least the 18th century, but may be older.

The author of the lyrics and the composer of the music are unknown. The first known publication of the song's current version was in 1928 in the Oxford Book of Carols; however, earlier versions of the song had been published, including, but not limited to, publications in 1838, 1857, and 1868 by William Chappell, Robert Bell, and William Henry Husk respectively. Husk's 1868 publication contained a reference to it being sung by wassailers in the 1790s in Gloucestershire. "Gloucestershire Wassail" has a Roud Folk Song Index number of 209.

== History ==
The song was sung in parts of England during the days of wassailing. This historical setting and the nature of its lyrics make it similar to carols such as "Here We Come A-wassailing". The current most common version of the song was first published in 1928 in the Oxford Book of Carols by one of the book's three authors, Ralph Vaughan Williams. The tune was sung to him in August or July 1909 at the Swan Inn, an inn in Pembridge, Herefordshire, by an unknown old person from Gloucestershire.

Vaughan Williams published the tune and these lyrics in 1913. However, for the 1928 Oxford publication, he used different lyrics; the ones commonly sung today. These lyrics he largely got from renowned folk music revivalist Cecil J. Sharp, as well as some from nineteenth century printed sources. Sharp's collection of lyrics were published in his 1916 book English Folk Songs, Collected and Arranged with Pianoforte Accompaniment by Cecil J. Sharp. In the book, Sharp wrote:

The first six stanzas in the text are those that Mr. [William] Bayliss [of Buckland] gave me; they are printed without any alteration. The last three stanzas are from a variant sung to me by Mr. Isaac Bennett of Little Sodbury (Gloucestershire). The words are very similar to, but not identical with, those of "The Gloucestershire Wassailer's Song" quoted by [Robert] Bell (Ballads and Songs of the Peasantry of England, p. 183).

Through the years, there have been, and to a lesser extent still are, many different variations of the lyrics, chorus, and number of stanzas sung, depending on historical time period, geographic location, arrangement, and individual circumstance. The underlying tune used for the lyrics has also altered considerably, depending on similar factors. However the currently used version of the tune is documented to have existed at least several hundred years ago. The sheet music from Husk's 1868 book, which contains the farthest-back reference of it being sung (to the 1790s), resembles today's, and in the oldest known sheet music publication, from an 1813 piece in England's Times Telescope, the tune resembles today's.

Gower Wassail appears to be a related wassailing song.

== Recordings ==
The folklorist James Madison Carpenter made several audio recordings of the song in Gloucestershire in the early 1930s, which can be heard online via the Vaughan Williams Memorial Library website. Many other audio recordings were made of Gloucestershire residents singing wassailing songs in the second half of the twentieth century.

The American musical group Mannheim Steamroller did an instrumental cover of the song titled "Wassail, Wassail" on their 1984 album Christmas. American early music group Waverly Consort recorded and released the song on their 1994 album A Waverly Consort Christmas.

Blur recorded a version which was given away as a free 7" by a man dressed as Santa Claus at their Christmas gig at the Hibernian Club in Fulham, London on 15 December 1992. It was credited to 'Gold Frankincense and Blur'.

Canadian folk/world music singer/composer Loreena McKennitt released the song on her 2008 Christmas album A Midwinter Night's Dream.

Canadian folk trio Trilogy (Eileen McGann, Cathy Miller, and David K.) included the song on the 1996 recording of their touring production, "2000 Years of Christmas".

== Lyrics ==
Below are the ten present-day, most commonly heard stanzas of lyrics, as originally published in the Oxford Book of Carols. Note the first stanza is also the chorus; it is traditionally sung at the beginning of the song and after each stanza, or some variation thereof:

(Chorus)
1. Wassail! wassail! all over the town,
Our toast it is white and our ale it is brown;
Our bowl it is made of the white maple tree;
With the wassailing bowl, we'll drink to thee.

2. Here's to our horse, and to his right ear,
God send our master a happy new year:
A happy new year as e'er he did see,
With my wassailing bowl I drink to thee.

3. So here is to Cherry and to his right cheek
Pray God send our master a good piece of beef
And a good piece of beef that may we all see
With the wassailing bowl, we'll drink to thee.

4. Here's to our mare, and to her right eye,
God send our mistress a good Christmas pie;
A good Christmas pie as e'er I did see,
With my wassailing bowl I drink to thee. (Note: A commonly sung variation of the fourth stanza is: And here is to Dobbin and to his right eye, Pray God send our master a good Christmas pie, And a good Christmas pie that we may all see; With our wassailing bowl we'll drink to thee.)

5. So here is to Broad Mary and to her broad horn
May God send our master a good crop of corn
And a good crop of corn that may we all see
With the wassailing bowl, we'll drink to thee.

6. And here is to Fillpail (Note: According to William Henry Husk's 1868 book, the name of "Fillpail" (the cow), was sometimes replaced with the name of one of the wassailer's cows. Other names of the horse and mare, given in his version of the lyrics, were also similarly replaced.) and to her left ear
Pray God send our master a happy New Year
And a happy New Year as e'er he did see
With the wassailing bowl, we'll drink to thee.

7. Here's to our cow, and to her long tail,
God send our master us never may fail
Of a cup of good beer: I pray you draw near,
And our jolly wassail it's then you shall hear.

8. Come butler, come fill us a bowl of the best
Then we hope that your soul in heaven may rest
But if you do draw us a bowl of the small
Then down shall go butler, bowl and all.

9. Be here any maids? I suppose here be some;
Sure they will not let young men stand on the cold stone!
Sing hey O, maids! come trole back the pin,
And the fairest maid in the house let us all in.

10. Then here's to the maid in the lily white smock
Who tripped to the door and slipped back the lock
Who tripped to the door and pulled back the pin
For to let these jolly wassailers in. (Note: There are several other common slight variations to the traditional 10 Oxford stanzas shown above. Line three of the first stanza is sometimes sung "And the wassail bowl...". Line one of the seventh stanza is sometimes sung "And here is to Colly...". And so on and so forth.)

== Music ==
Source

== Notes and references ==
Notes
