= White maple =

White maple may refer to:

- Acer saccharinum, a North American tree also called silver maple
- Wood, especially the sapwood, from a number of Acer species, particularly:
  - Acer saccharum, also called the hard or sugar maple
