= Gower Wassail =

Welsh folk song

The Gower Wassail is a wassail song from Gower, Wales. Wassailing is a midwinter tradition wherein either orchards or households are blessed by guisers, which came to Wales through exposure to English custom. The song is printed in A.L. Lloyd's book Folk Song in England (1967), having been heard from Phil Tanner. Structurally, the song is in 6/8 time with bacchius trisyllables, a Balliol rhyme scheme, and the "ffal de radl" musical syllables characteristic of much of Welsh folk songs. Some of the lyrics closely resemble other popular wassailing songs, such as the "Gloucestershire Wassail".

== Lyrics ==
The majority of versions of the song begin with the same two stanzas, although pronouns (i.e. you, we, your, our, etc.) vary. Following the second verse and chorus, the number of stanzas and their order vary from version to version. The primary difference between the lyrics that appear here is that one version is a dialogue between the wassailers and the master and mistress they are appealing to for hospitality. The other version is sung from the wassailers’ perspective alone. All the known stanzas are included below.

Chorus A	Chorus B
Fol de dol fol de dol de dol Fol de dol de dol fol de dol de de Fol de da ro fol de da di Sing tu re lye do	Al dal di dal di dal Dal di dal di dal Dal di dal di dee Sing deero, sing daddy Sing too ral di do

Opening Stanzas
A-wassail, a-wassail throughout all the town
Our cup it is white and our ale it is brown
Our wassail is made of the good ale and cake (too)
Some nutmeg and ginger, the best you can bake (do)

Our wassail is made of the elderberry bough
And so my good neighbors we'll drink unto thou
Besides all on earth, you have apples in store
Pray let us come in for it's cold by the door

Dialogue Version	Standard Version
Carolers Now master and mistress let your company forbear To fill up our wassail with you cider and beer We want none of your pale beer, nor none of your small But a drop of your kilderkin, that's next to the wall Now master and mistress if you are within Pray send out your maid with her lily-white skin For to open the door without more delay For our time it is precious and we cannot stay Master & Mistress; You've brought your wassail, which is very well known But I can assure you we've as good of our own As for your jolly wassail, we care not one pin But its for your good company we'll let you come in Together; Here's a health to our Cooley and her croo'ed horn May God send her Master a good crop of corn Of barley and wheat and all sorts of grain May God send her Mistress a long life to reign Carolers; Now Master and Mistress, know you will give Unto our jolly wassail as long as you live And if we do live to another new year We'll call in again just to see who lives here	There's a master and a mistress sitting down by the fire While we poor wassail boys stand out in the mire Come you pretty maid with your silver headed pin Pray open the door and let us come in It's we poor wassail boys so weary and cold Please drop some small silver into our bowl And if we survive for another new year Perhaps we may call and see who does live here We know by the moon that we are not too soon And we know by the sky that we are not too high And we know by the stars that we are not too far And we know by the ground that we are within sound We hope that your apple trees prosper and bear So that we may have cider when we call next year And where you have one barrel we hope you'll have ten So that we may have cider when we call again

== Main references ==
- Mudcat Café:

== Versions ==
- Shirley Collins on Anthems in Eden
- Steeleye Span on the album Ten Man Mop, or Mr. Reservoir Butler Rides Again and on The Journey
- The Oh Hellos on the EP The Oh Hellos' Family Christmas Album: Volume II
