= Phil Tanner =

Welsh folk singer

- Born: Phillip Tanner; 16 February 1862; Llangennith, West Gower, Glamorgan, Wales
- Died: 19 February 1950 (aged 88) Eventide Home, Penmaen, South Gower
- Genres: Traditional folk, lilting, music hall
- Occupations: Singer, weaver, farm labourer, pub host, organiser of folk customs, raconteur
- Years active: ca.1880–1950

Phil Tanner (16 February 1862 – 19 February 1950) was a Welsh traditional singer. He was from Llangenith in the Gower Peninsula (South Wales).

== Songs and singing style ==
Tanner was an invaluable source of several once popular English language folk songs, such as the Child Ballads "Barbara Allen" and "Henry Martin", as well as the songs "Sweet Primroses" and "The Bonny Bunch of Roses", all of which were recorded in the 1930s and 40s. His performance of the local Gower wassailing song became known as "Gower Wassail" and was printed by A.L. Lloyd and covered by popular folk groups including Steeleye Span.

His songs were all in the English language, using the Gower dialect, since the Gower of his youth was still culturally distinct from the rest of Wales, and his style of singing is compared to that of English singers.

== Audience and broadcasts ==
Renowned locally as "the Gower Nightingale", he reached a national audience in his seventies with recordings for Columbia and the BBC and an appearance on the BBC radio programme In Town Tonight. Shortly before he died, he was featured in an article by John Ormond Thomas for Picture Post, and recorded once again by the BBC.

== Legacy ==
In 1976, he was remembered in a BBC Radio 4 tribute by the Welsh radio broadcaster Wynford Vaughan-Thomas recalling "the voice of the sanest, happiest, kindest eccentric I ever knew, the voice of Phil Tanner, the Gower Nightingale".

His recordings have been reissued several times, most notably on the CD The Gower Nightingale, which also includes the Wynford Vaughan-Thomas radio programme.

The editor of one reissue, the eminent folklorist Alan Lomax wrote: "When Phil died, England lost her best traditional singer".

Folk revival musicians were inspired by Tanner's songs, particularly "Gower Wassail".
