= Wish tree =

Tree used to make votive offerings

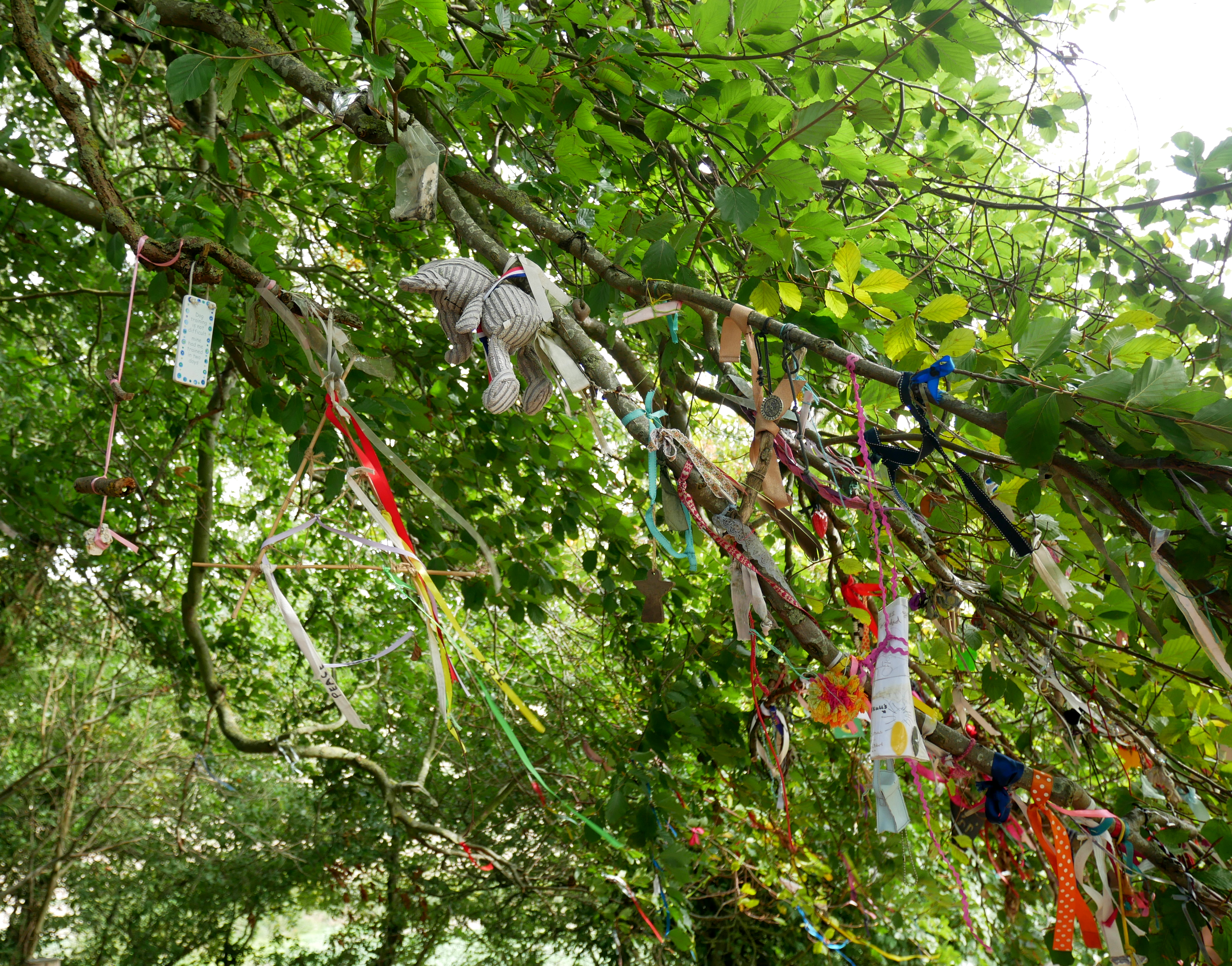
Wishes and offerings on the tree at Coldrum Long Barrow, England

A wish tree (or wishing tree) is a tree, usually distinguished by species, location or appearance, which is used as an object of wishes and offerings. Such trees are identified as possessing a special religious or spiritual value. Postulants make votive offerings in hopes of having a wish granted, or a prayer answered, from a nature spirit, saint or goddess, depending on the local tradition.

== Practices ==
=== Coin trees ===
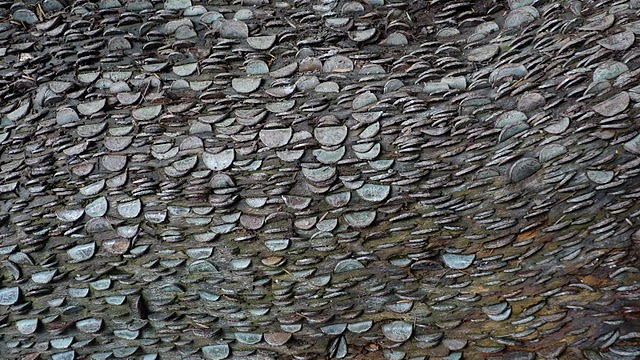
Coin tree at Aira Force, Cumbria

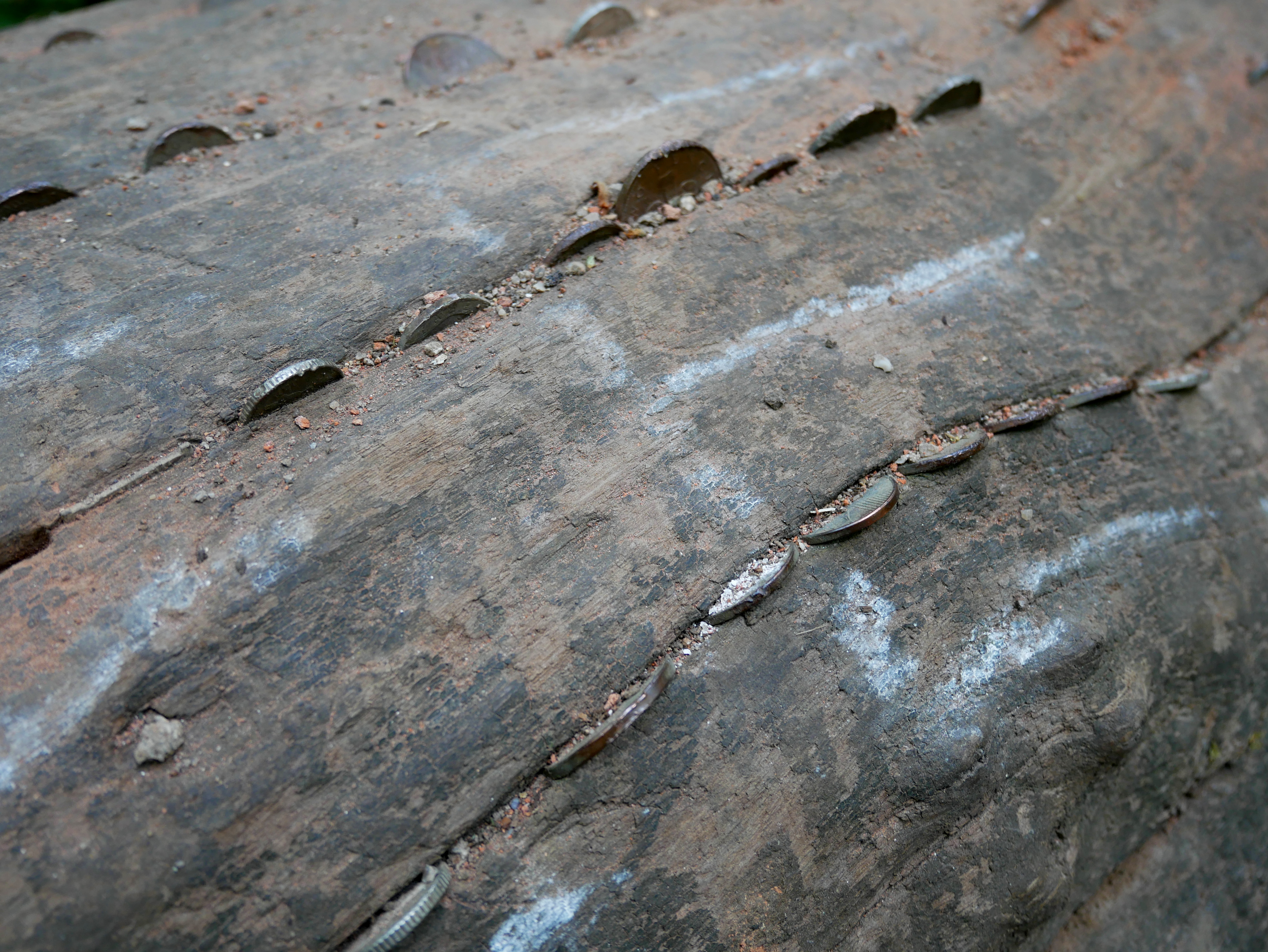
A comparatively sparsely decorated coin tree at High Elms Country Park, southeast London

One form of votive offering is the token offering of a coin. Coin trees (or money trees) are found in parts of Scotland, Northern England, and Wales. Folklorist Ceri Houlbrook observed actions at a coin tree in Aira Force, Cumbria, noting that a succession of at least twelve families passed by the site and decided to hammer coins into it using a piece of limestone lying around; she commented that this custom appeared to offer "little variation: it is imitative, formulaic, homogeneous". In 2019 the National Trust for Scotland said 'For many years people have hammered coins into tree stumps and trunks as some sort of votive offering to make a wish. On our woodland properties we could tolerate it as long as it was on a small-scale, but now it seems to have taken off as a ‘fashionable’ thing to do and is out of control.'

- The remains of one such tree can be found near Ardmaddy House in Argyll, Scotland, a hawthorn, which is a species traditionally linked with fertility. The trunk and branches are covered with hundreds of coins which have been driven through the bark and into the wood. The local tradition is that a wish will be granted for each of the coins so treated.
- On Isle Maree in Loch Maree, Gairloch, in the Highlands is an oak wish tree made famous by a visit in 1877 by Queen Victoria mentioned in her published diaries. The tree, and others surrounding it, are festooned with hammered-in coins. It is near the healing well of St. Maelrubha, to which votive offerings were made, including the sacrifice of bulls, which continued up to the 18th century, according to records.
- Near Mountrath, County Laois, is a shapeless old wish tree in the form of a sycamore tree called St. Fintan's Well. The original well was filled in, but the water re-appeared in the centre of the tree. Hundreds of Irish pennies have been beaten into the bark as good luck offerings.
- The High Force Waterfall has a coin wish tree in the grounds of the waterfall.
- A coin wish tree can be found in Colby Woodland Garden.
- A coin tree is near the Tarr Steps in Exmoor.
- A coin tree can be found in the grounds of Bolton Abbey.
- Ingleborough Nature Trail on the Clapham Beck in North Yorkshire has a yew as a coin tree.
- A coin tree can be found on the walk around Tarn Hows in the Lake District. The tree has been felled and is on the west side of the tarn on the West side of the path.
- A coin tree stump can be found in front of the Fairy Glen Falls on the Black Isle of Scotland.
- Many public houses, such as the Punch Bowl in Askham, near Penrith in Cumbria and the Old Hill Inn, Chapel-le-Dale, Yorkshire, have old beams with splits in them into which coins are forced for luck.

=== Clootie trees ===
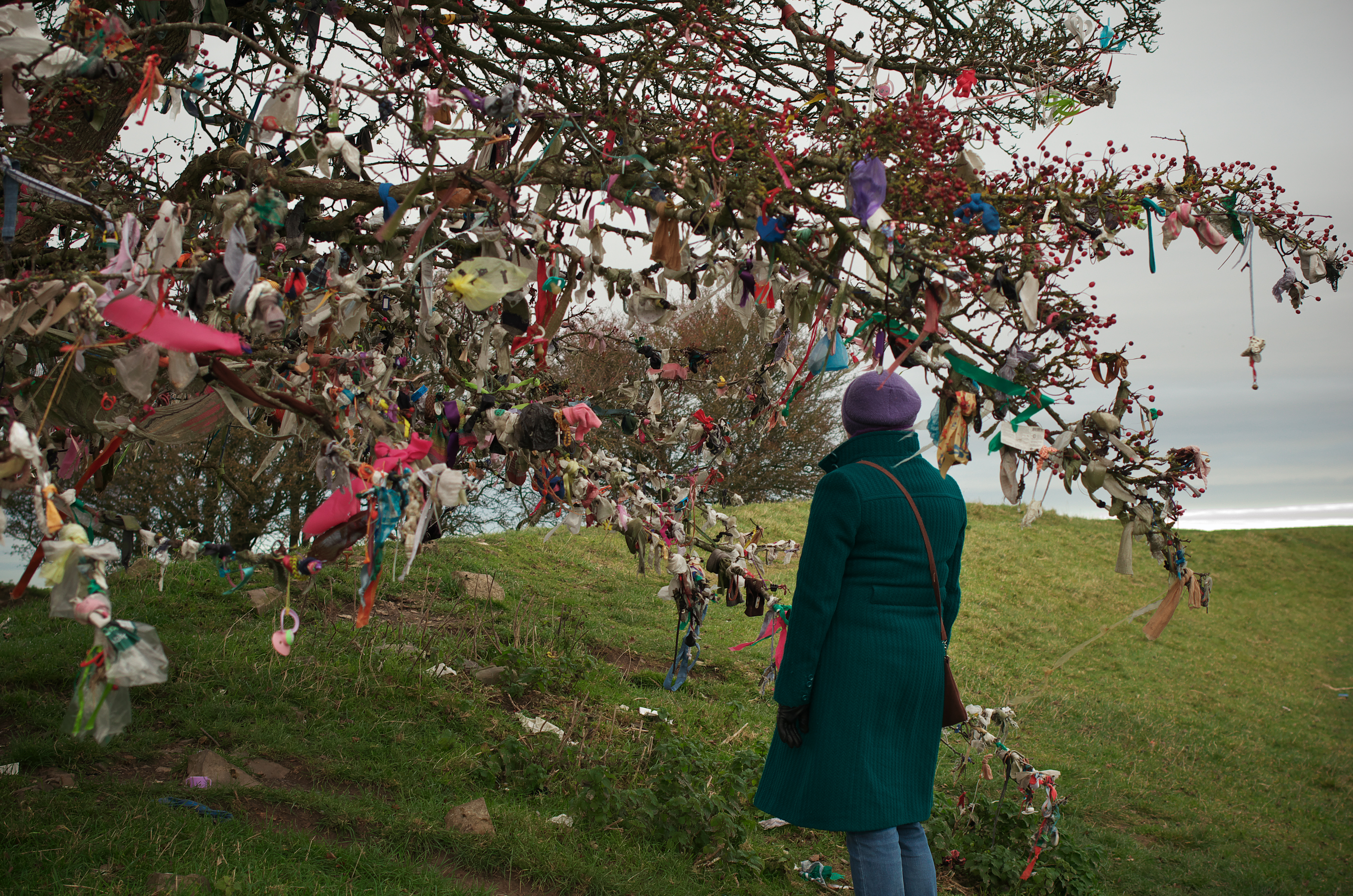
A clootie tree at the Hill of Tara, Ireland

Small strips of cloth, ribbons or prayer beads are tied to some trees as a healing ritual or to wish for good health. These should be material that can easily wither away. Such trees are known as "clootie trees" and are usually found growing beside holy wells (also called clootie wells) or at sacred sites. They are most common in Scotland, Ireland and Cornwall.

=== Apple tree wassail ===
The Apple Wassail is a traditional form of wassailing practiced in the West Country, England. Singing wassailers visit the cider orchards, where they recite an incantation, leave wassail-soaked toast in the tree branches, and pour cider over the roots. The purpose of the ceremony is to bless the apple trees and to ensure a good yield and good luck for the harvest.

=== Shoe trees ===
In a related cultural tradition found in many locations, including the United States, supplicants will toss or hurl shoes into trees that are locally designated as wellsprings of good fortune.

=== Nail trees ===
There are many nail trees (called "arbres à clous") in Belgium and other regions, and the practice is based on the ancient popular beliefs that a physical illness (one's evil spirit) could, through a ritual process, be extirpated from the body by driving a nail into these trees.

=== Other offerings ===
- The Lam Tsuen Wishing Trees are located in Hong Kong near the Tin Hau Temple in Lam Tsuen. Two banyan trees are frequented by tourists and the locals during the Lunar New Year. Previously, they burnt joss sticks, wrote their wishes on joss paper tied to an orange, and then threw them up to hang in these trees, believing that if the paper successfully hung onto one of the tree branches, their wishes would come true.
- The sacred well of Saint Tanew – or St Enoch – in Glasgow, Scotland, was much visited for cures and the old tree beside it was covered in small bits of tin-iron nailed to it by pilgrims. The offerings were shaped as eyes, feet, hands, ears, etc. depending on the cure hoped for. The saint was mother to Saint Mungo. In Glasgow's Hidden Garden at Pollokshields, and at the Kagyu Samye Ling Monastery in Scotland, trees have been planted onto which people can tie white labels, on which they have written their wishes. A number of wish trees have been set up to make a wish for the environment, such as at the Loch Lomond and the Trossachs National Park Centre at Balloch in Scotland. People make their wish for and pledge to help the environment and tie the wish label to the tree.
- The Christmas tree is often quoted as being a pagan symbol connected with tree worship, clearly linked with good luck achieved through offerings (decoration) to and veneration of special trees.

== Other cultural traditions ==
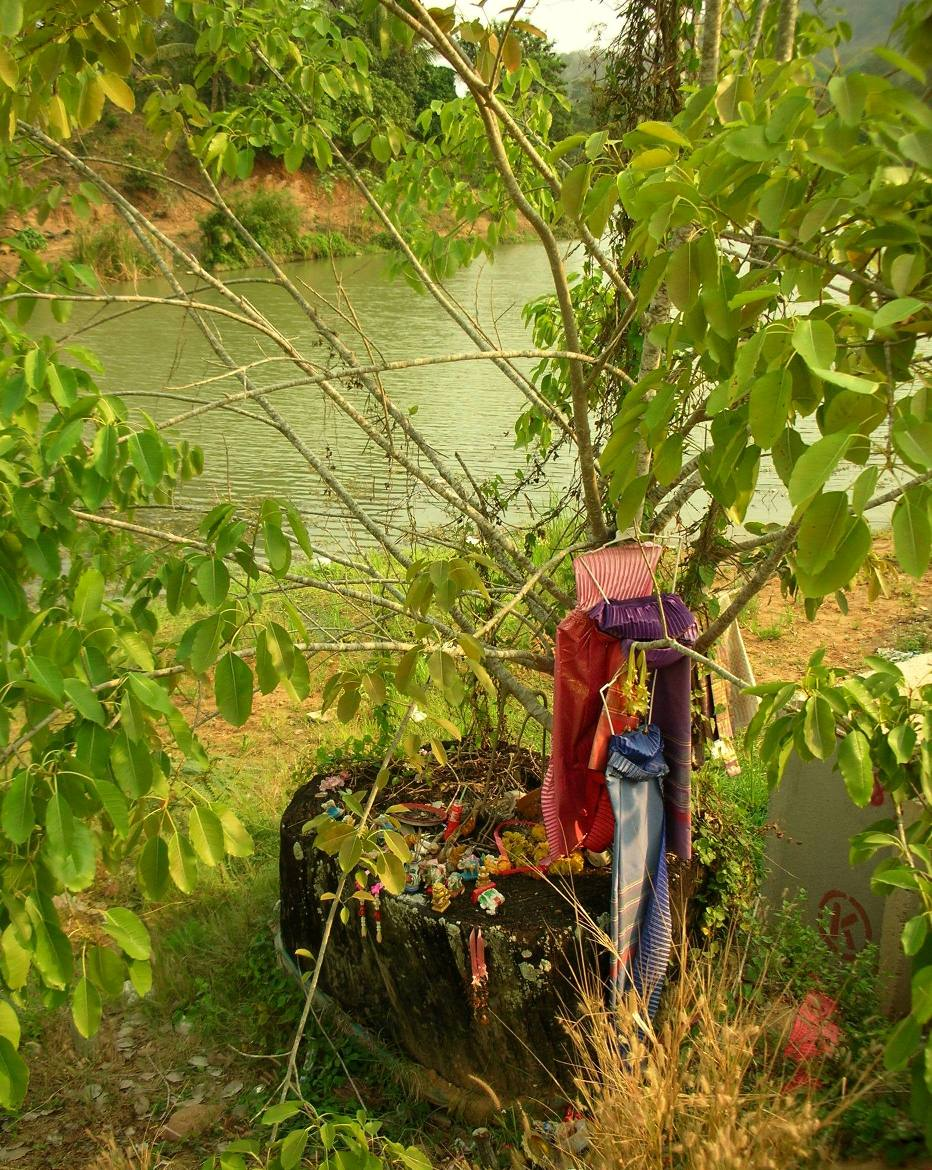
Hopea odorata tree (ตะเคียน) stump with offerings near a Nang Ta-khian shrine. Dan Sing Khon.

- In Hindu mythology, the banyan tree is also called kalpavriksha, meaning "wish- fulfilling tree", as it represents eternal life because of its seemingly ever-expanding branches. The coconut tree is also called a kalpavriksha because every single part of the tree is useful, from the tips of the fronds to the roots.
- Ashen tree, ashen tree, / Pray buy these warts of me was a rhyme one had to sing whilst sticking a pin first into one's warts and then into the tree.
- The Wishing Tree or Kissing Tree was made at Christmas or Yuletide before pine trees were introduced by Prince Albert in 1840. An evergreen bough was hung with apples, sweetmeats, and candles and decked with ribbons representing wishes.
- At the summit of the Fereneze Braes in Neilston, Renfrewshire, Scotland, there was an old hawthorn, well known locally as "The Kissing Tree". The story goes that if a young man could drive a nail fully into the thorn tree with a single blow, then he would be entitled to "ae fond kiss" on the spot from his sweetheart. Success in the task was considered proof of his suitability as a good suitor for the young lady. The original tree fell in around 1860, but in 1910, a replacement was said to exist. Driving a nail into the tree may link the custom with that of driving coins into trees as noted above.
- In parts of Yorkshire, a tree with two spreading branches which also formed a bower over the point of branching, was known as a Wish Tree by children who would climb onto the junction and make a wish.
- Charles Darwin encountered a tree in Argentina called Walleechu, which was regarded by the local inhabitants as a god. The tree was festooned with offerings such as cigars, food, water, cloth, etc., hung from the branches by bright strips of coloured thread.
- In Thai folklore there are certain spirits or fairies related to trees that are known generically as Nang Mai (นางไม้; "Lady of the Tree"), the most well-known being Nang Ta-khian. Legends in the Thai oral tradition say the spirit inhabits a Ta-khian tree and sometimes appears as a beautiful young woman wearing traditional Thai attire, usually in reddish or brownish colours, contrasting with Nang Tani who haunts a type of banana trees and is mostly represented in a green dress. Trees, logs, beams or keels of wooden boats where the spirit is deemed to reside are an object of pilgrimage and have lengths of colored silk tied as an offering. In present times Nang Ta-Khian is usually propitiated in order to be lucky in the lottery.
- Tanabata is a Japanese festival where wishes are written in strips of paper which are then tied to a shoot of bamboo.

== In art ==
=== Yoko Ono ===
Since the 1990s the wish tree has played a significant part in many of Yoko Ono's exhibitions. Ono's Wish Tree, installed in the Sculpture Garden of the Museum of Modern Art, New York in July 2010, has become very popular, with contributions from all over the world. Her Wish Tree for Washington, DC at the Hirshhorn Museum and Sculpture Garden was installed three years prior.

=== Mandali Mendrilla ===
Fashion Designer Mandali Mendrilla designed a runway collection inspired by Wish Trees called Wish Tree Dress that was presented on the catwalk of the Croatian Fashion Week in June 2015. Mandali also designed an interactive art installation called Mandala of Desires (Blue Lotus Wish Tree) made in peace silk and eco friendly textile ink, displayed at the China Art Museum in Shanghai in November 2015. Visitors were invited to place a wish on the sculpture dress, which will be taken to India and offered to a genuine living Wish Tree.

== Gallery ==
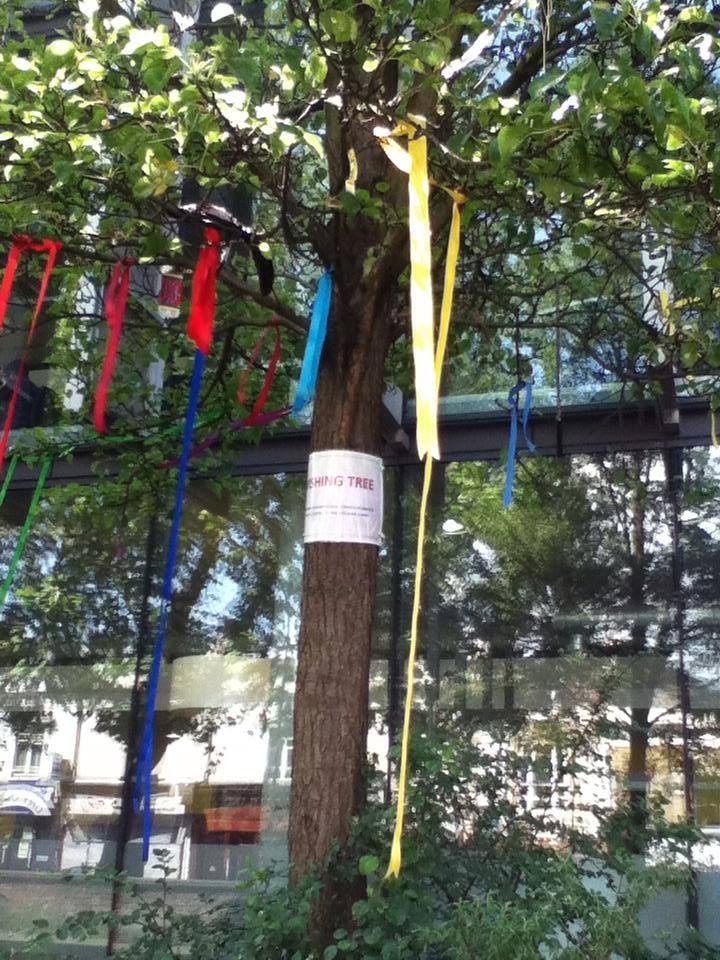
Wishing tree in New Cross, London

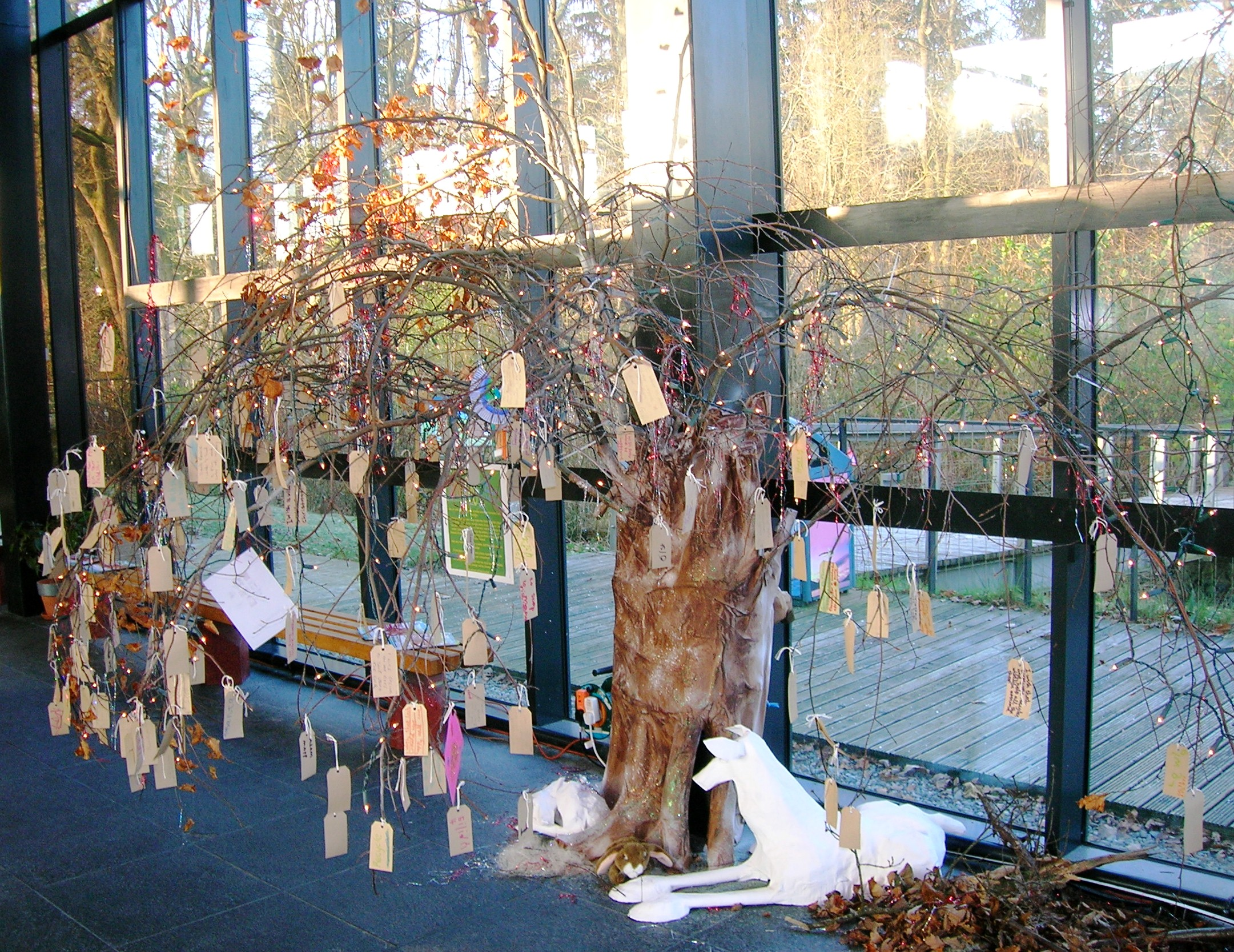
The Wish Tree in Balloch, Scotland

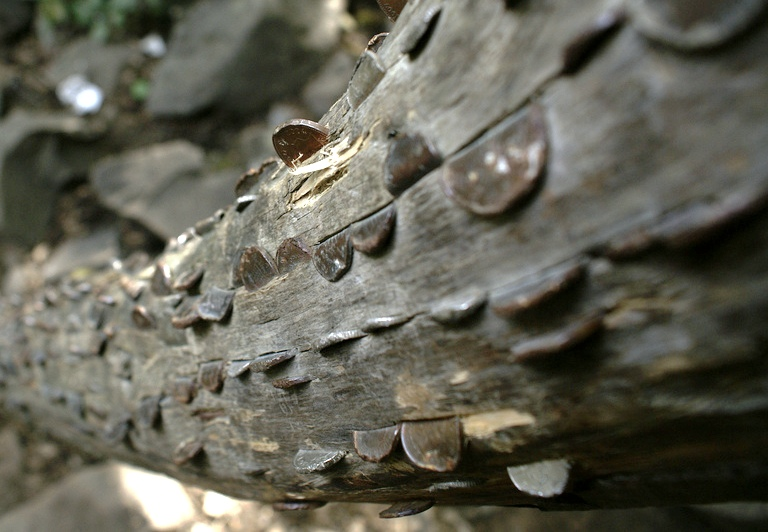
Wish tree with coins hammered into the trunk at High Force, in Teesdale, England

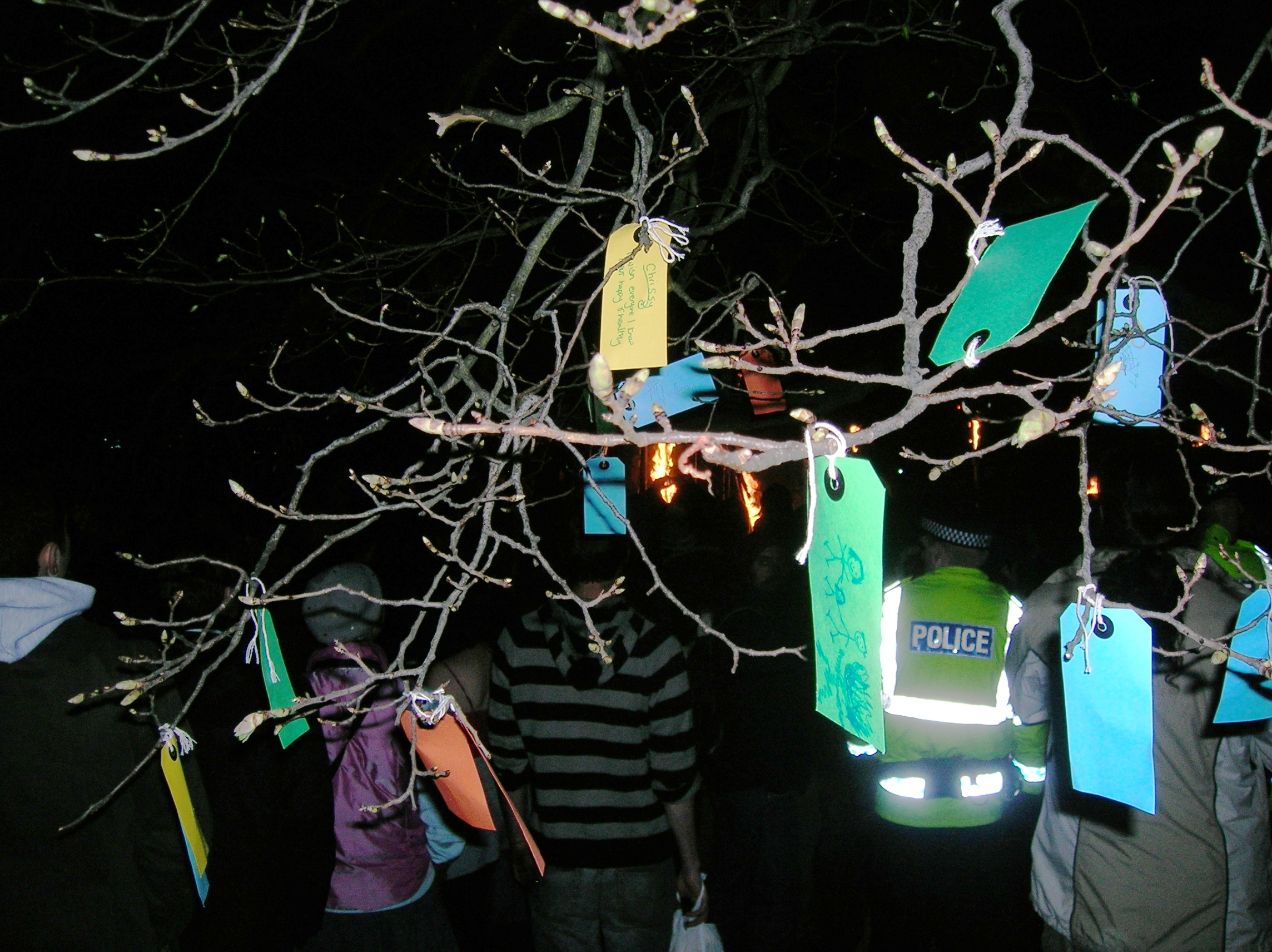
The Wish Tree on Calton Hill, Edinburgh viewed on Beltane Eve (30 April)

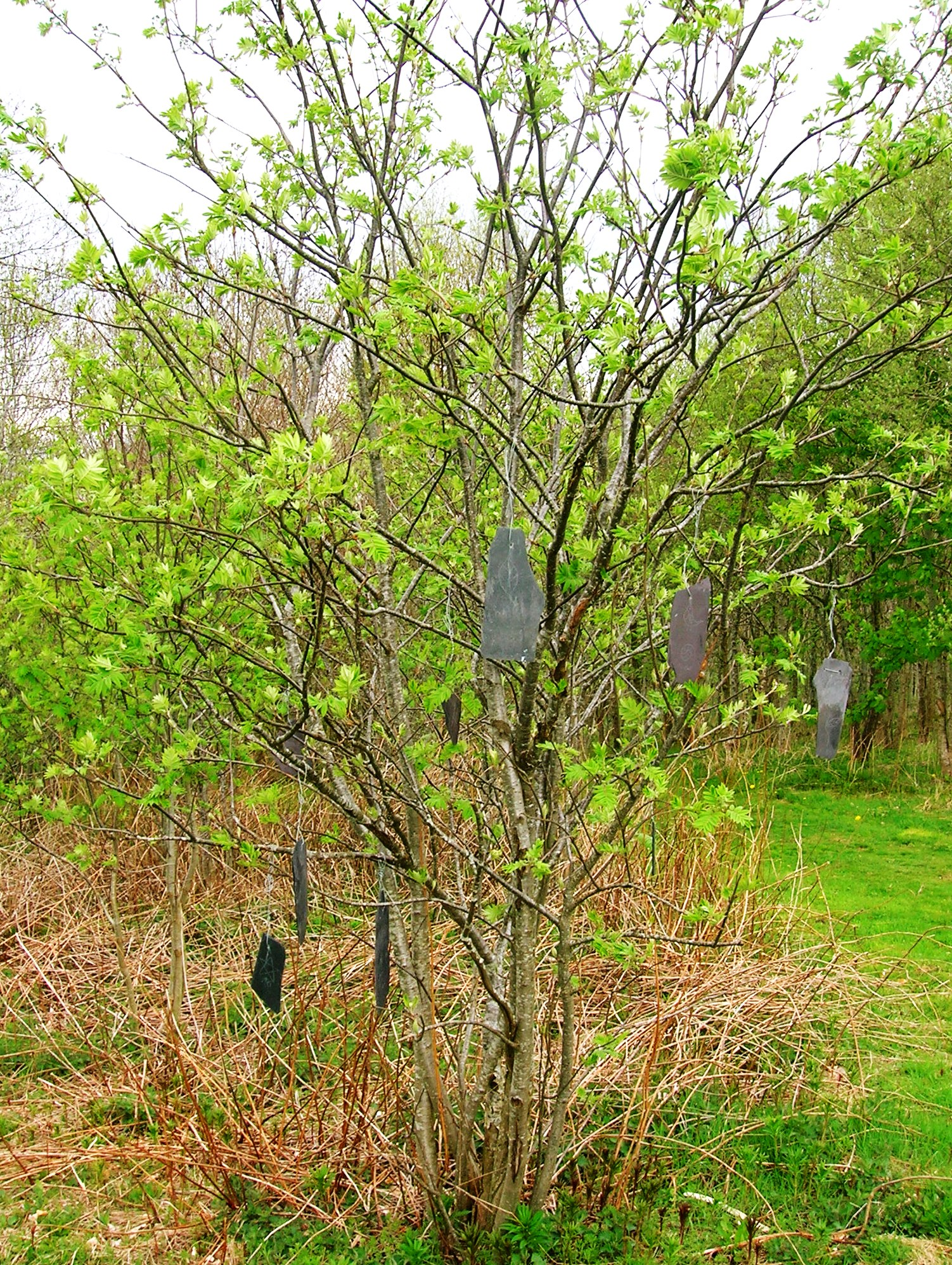
The rowan wish tree in Eglinton Country Park, Kilwinning, Scotland

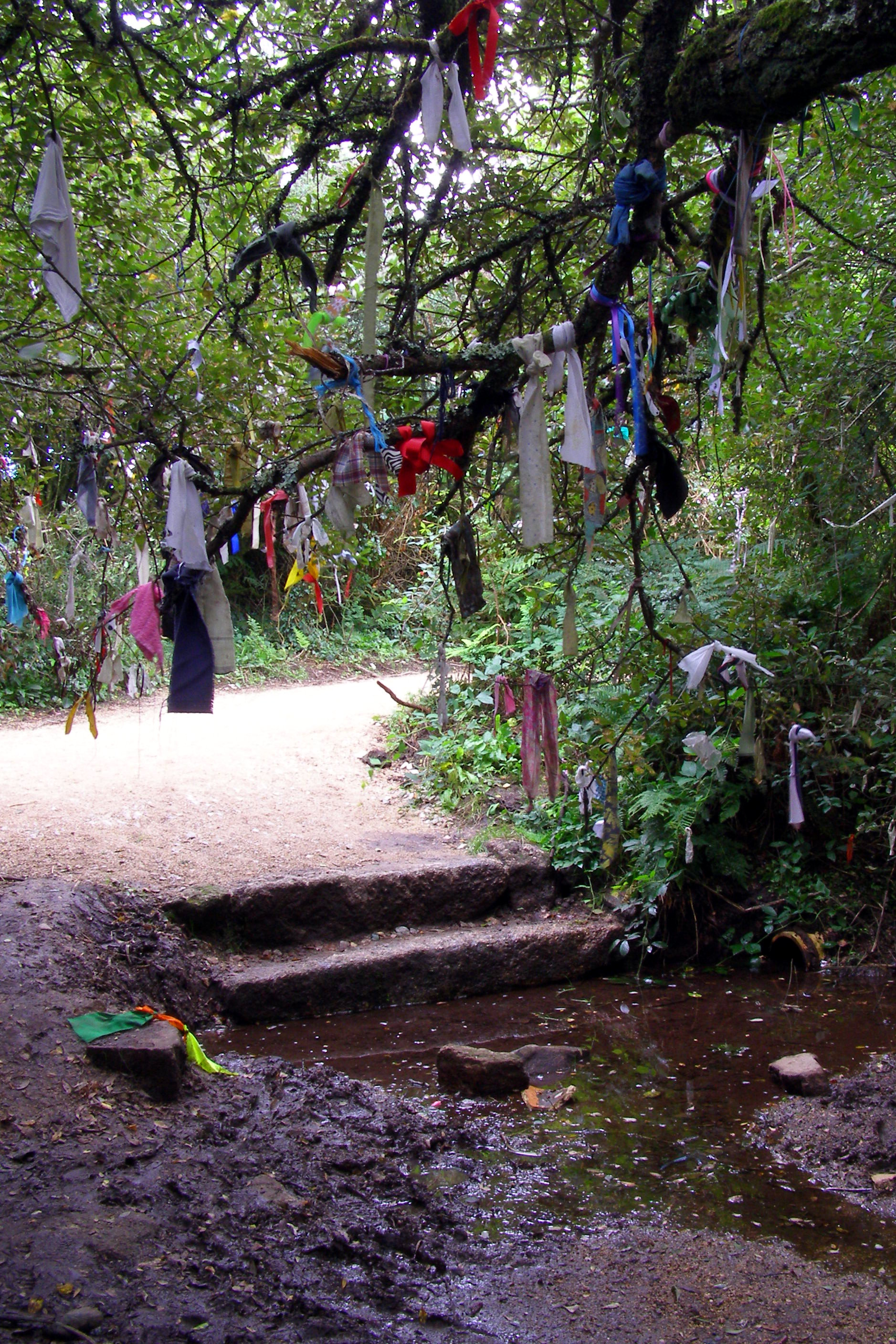
Wish Tree in Madron, Cornwall, England

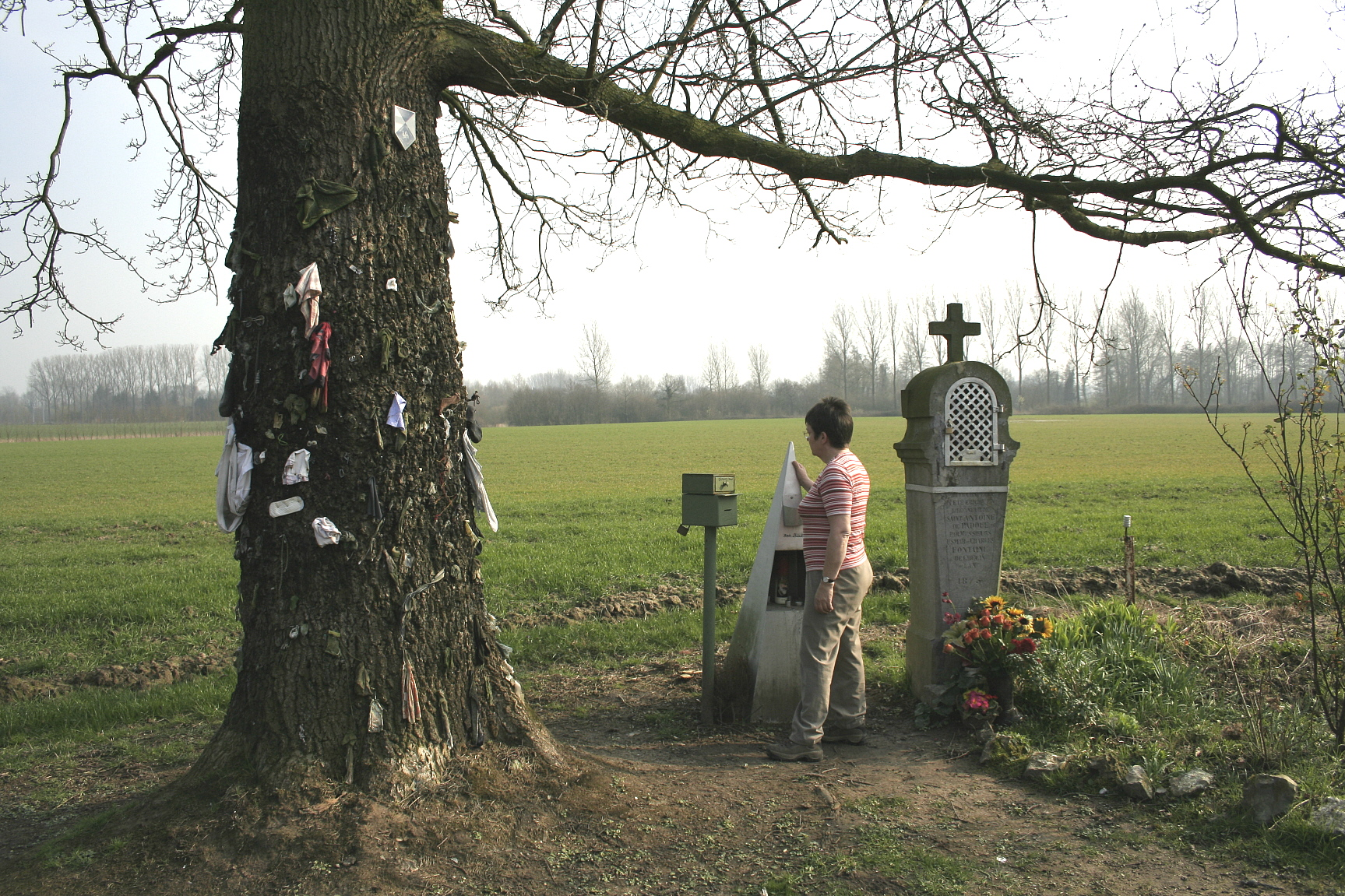
L'arbre à clous in Herchies Belgium

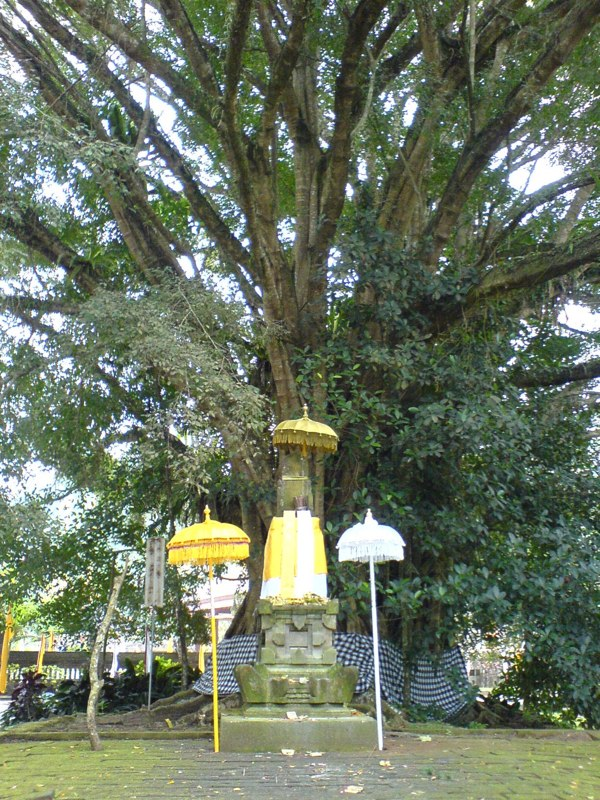
Holy tree near a Hindu temple, Tirta Empul, Bali, Indonesia

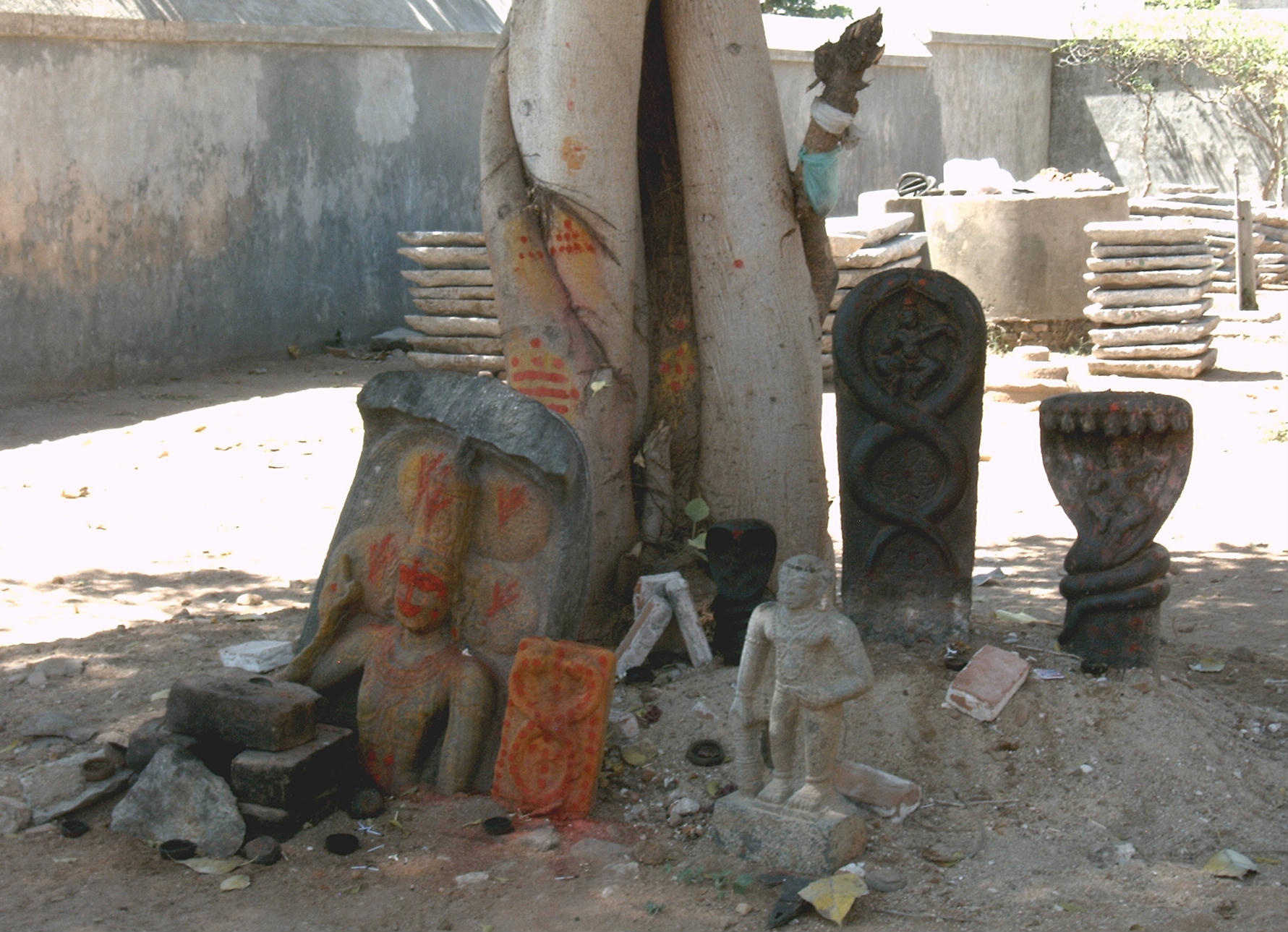
Holy tree, Tamil Nadu, India

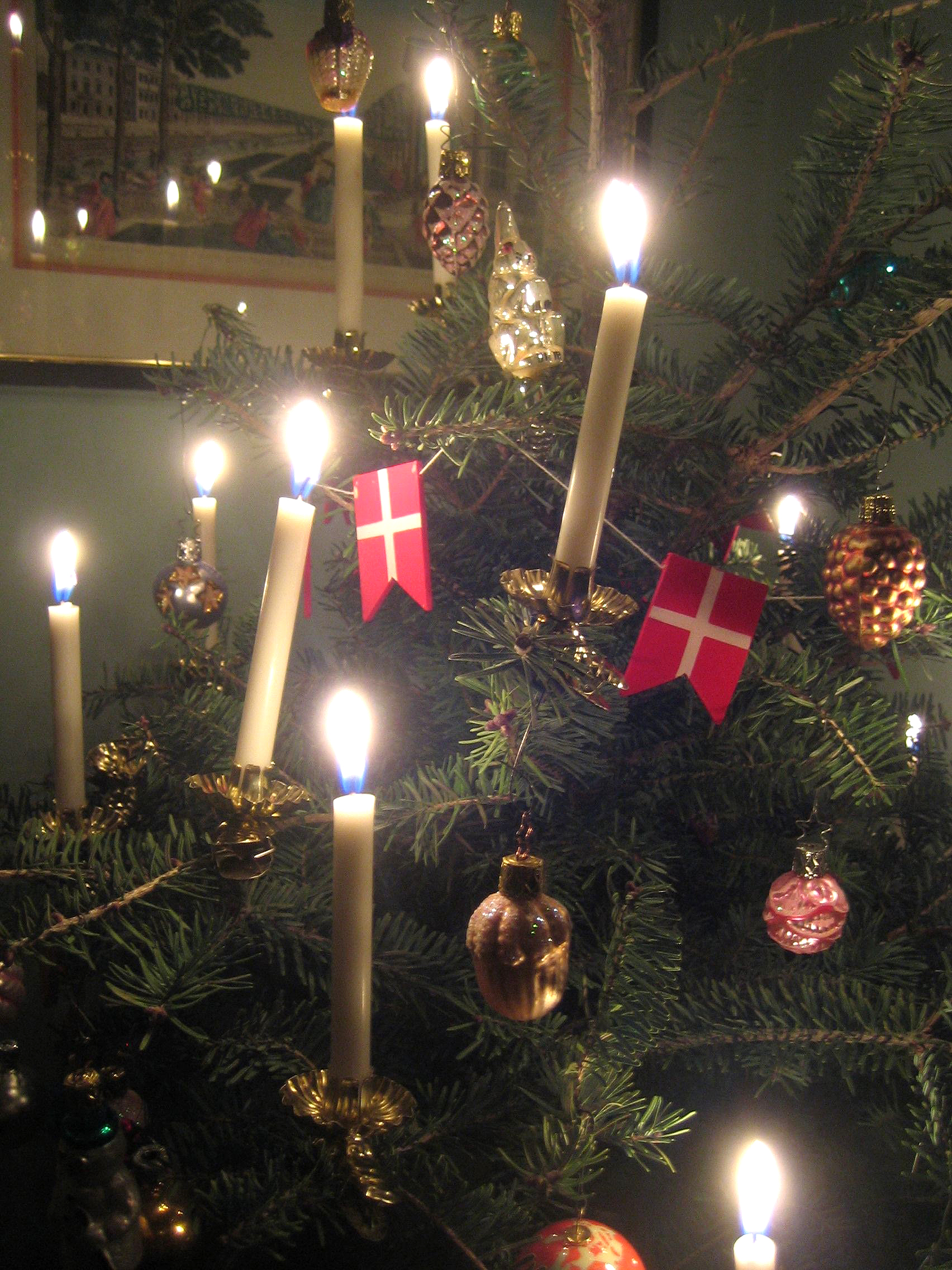
Christmas tree decorations, Denmark

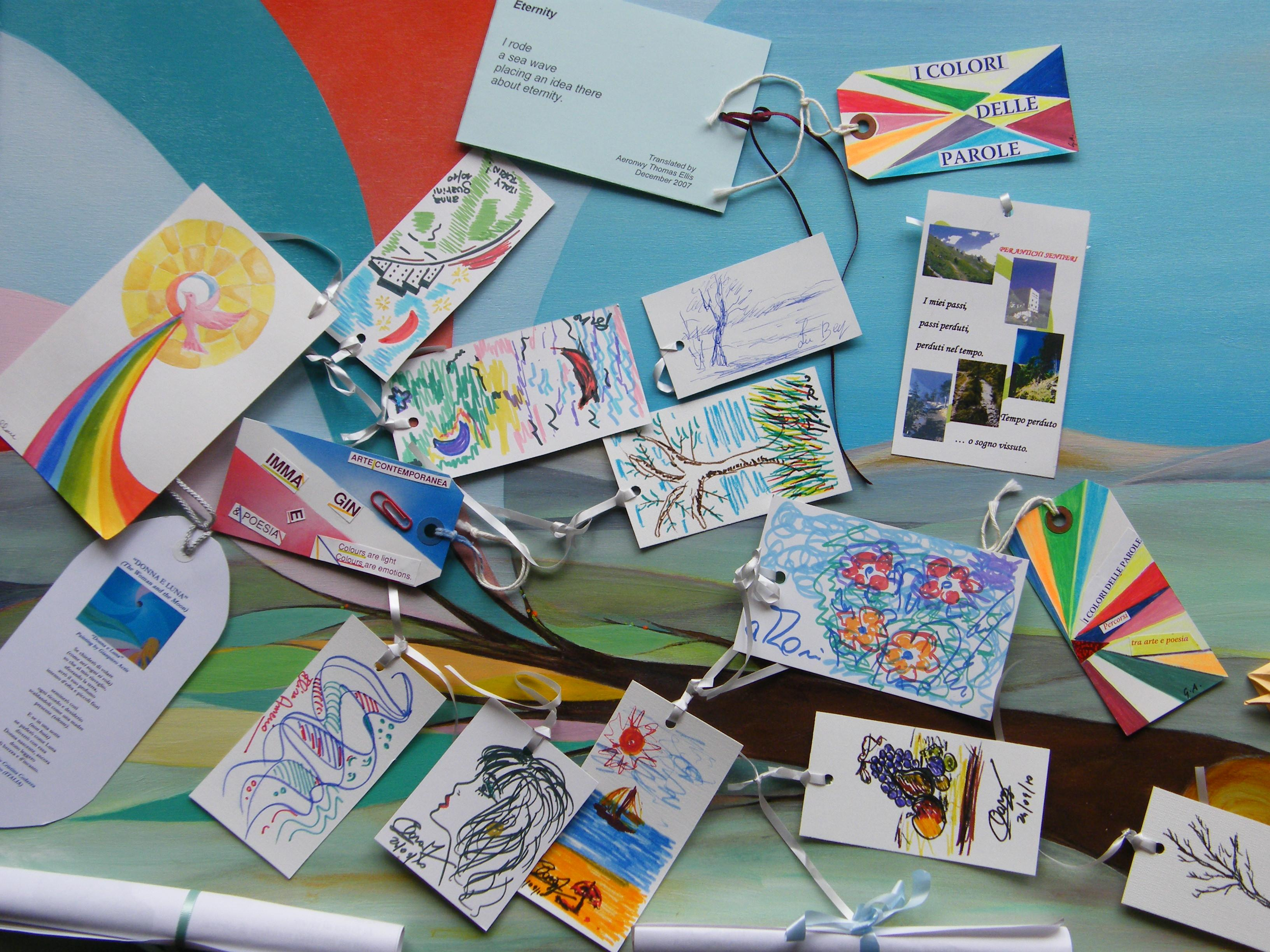
Cards and poems for Yoko Ono's Wish Tree in Washington, D.C., November 2010

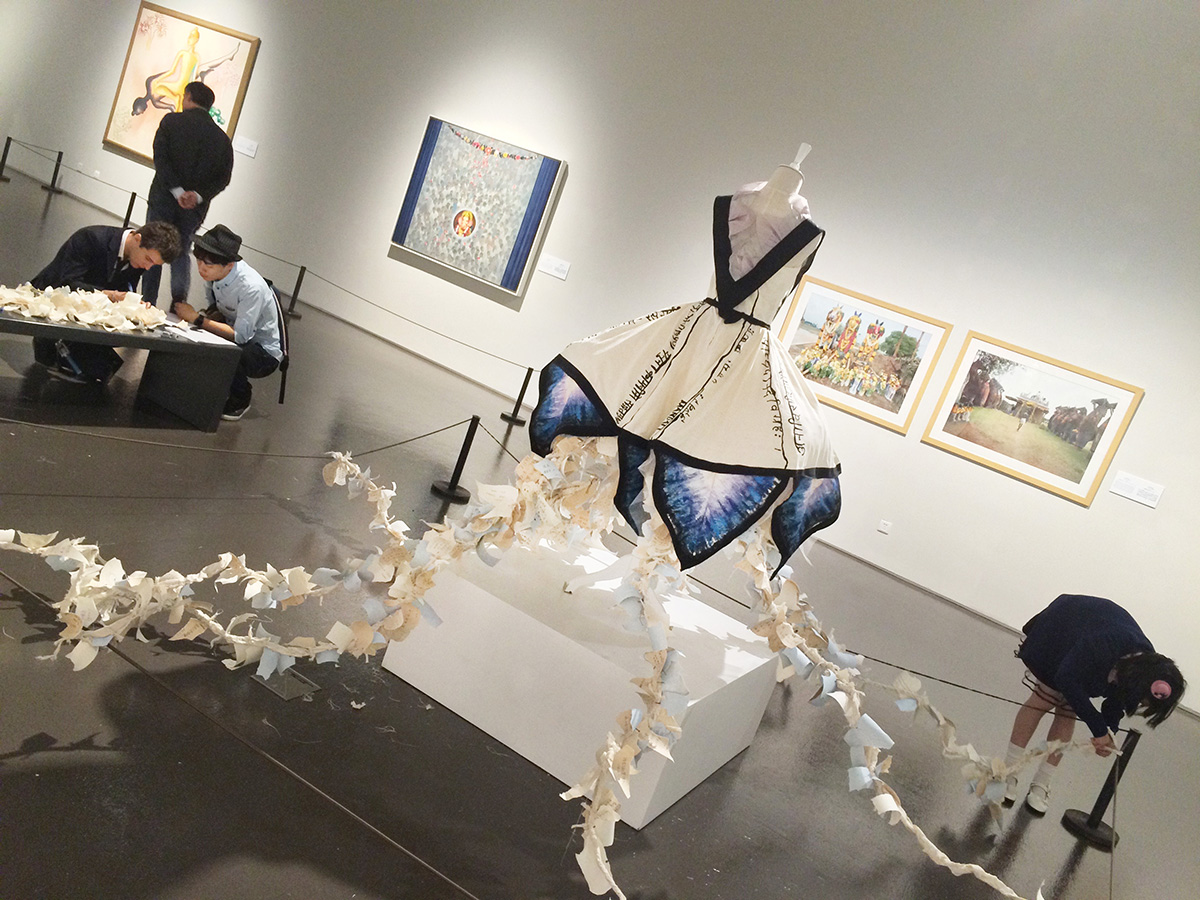
Mandali Mendrilla's interactive sculpture dress "Mandala of Desires" at the China Art Museum in Shanghai, November 2015.

== See also ==
- Sacred tree
- Apple Tree Man
- Lam Tsuen wishing trees
- Sacred grove
- Tanabata
- Touch Pieces
- Tree worship
- Shinboku
- Panty tree
