= Easter egg tree =

German tradition of decorating trees and bushes with Easter eggs

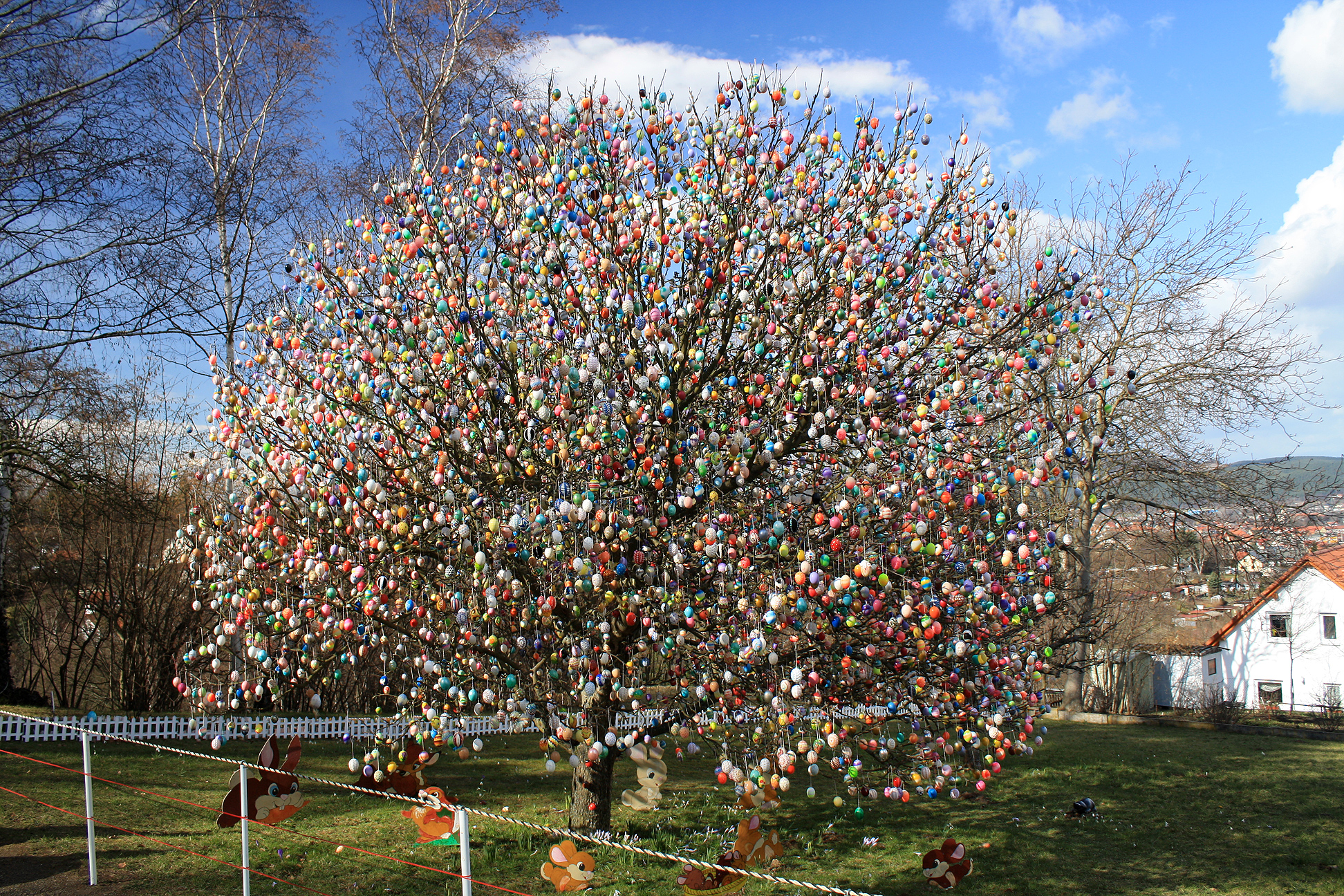
Saalfeld Easter egg tree with 9200 eggs, taken March 24, gfygfyttf

A German tradition of decorating trees and bushes with Easter eggs is known as the Ostereierbaum, or Easter egg tree. A notable example is the Saalfelder Ostereierbaum (Saalfeld Easter egg tree) in Saalfeld, Thuringia.

== History ==
The tradition in Germany to decorate the branches of trees and bushes with eggs for Easter is centuries old, originating in the Christian era. The egg is an ancient symbol of life all over the world. In Christianity, for the celebration of Eastertide, Easter eggs symbolize the empty tomb of Jesus, from which he was resurrected. Additionally, eggs carry a Trinitarian significance, with shell, yolk, and albumen being three parts of one egg. During Lent, the season of repentance that precedes Easter, eggs along with meat, lacticinia, and wine are foods that are traditionally abstained from, a practice that continues in Eastern Christianity and among certain Western Christian congregations that do the Daniel Fast. Eggs are hung on branches of outdoor trees and bushes and on cut branches inside. The custom is found mostly in Germany, Austria and German-speaking Switzerland, but also in other German-influenced places such as Ukraine, Poland, Czech Republic, Hungary, Moravia, and the Pennsylvania Dutch region of the United States. Egg trees are also sometimes decorated on May Day, Christmas, Whitsun, and the summer solstice. Other German Easter traditions include the dressing of public wells as Osterbrunnen, Osterhasen (Easter Hares) and Osterfeuer (Easter bonfires).

== Saalfelder Ostereierbaum ==
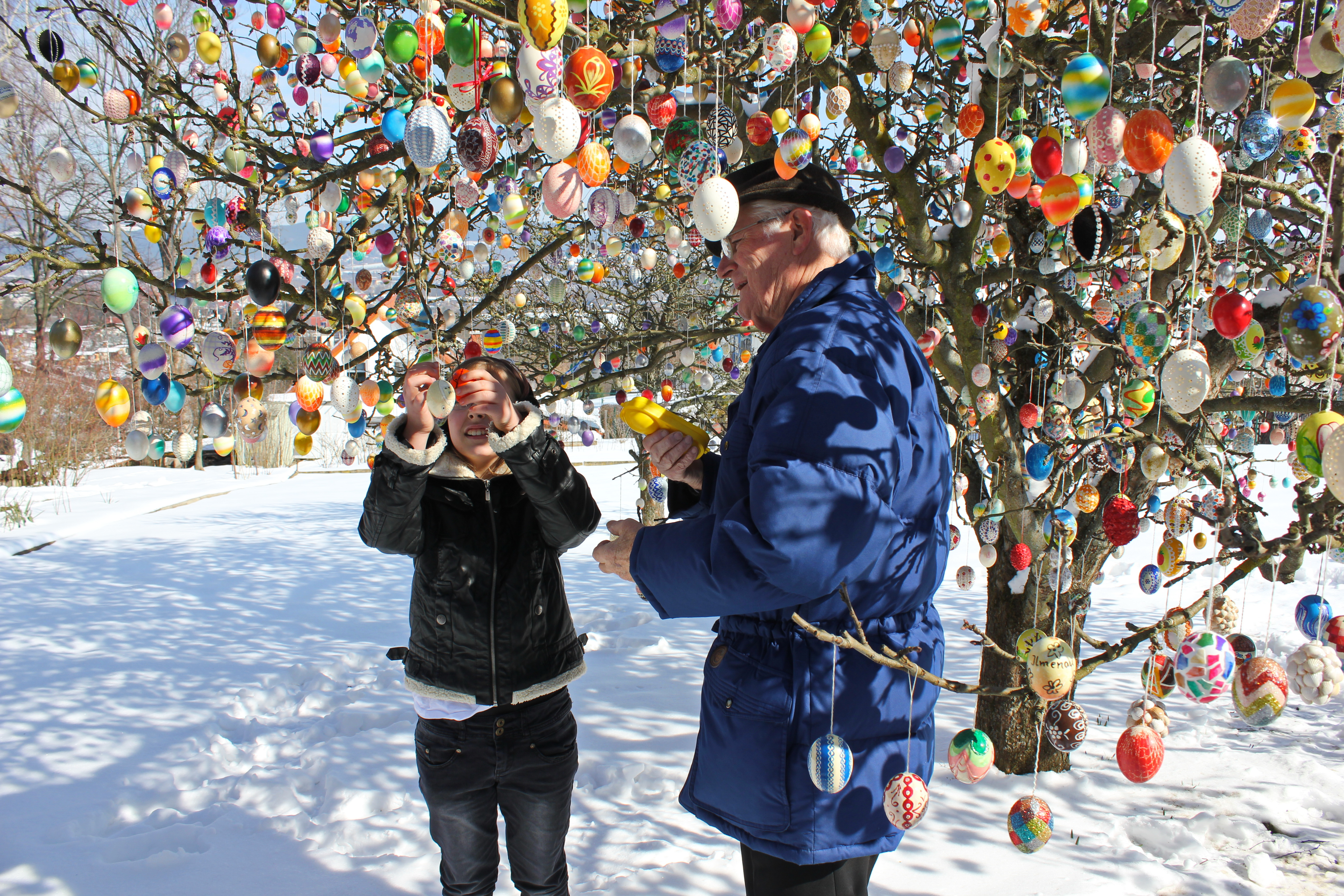
At the Saalfelder Ostereierbaum with Mr. Kraft in Saalfeld: was decorated from 1965 - 2015.

An exceptional example is Saalfelder Ostereierbaum, an apple tree in the garden of Volker Kraft in Saalfeld, Thuringia. Kraft and his family have been decorating the tree since 1965, starting with just 18 plastic eggs. This had been a childhood dream of Volker Kraft since he saw his first Easter "tree", a lilac bush which he passed on the way to school as a youth in 1945. By 1994 the Krafts had increased the number of eggs to about 350 pieces. As the tree grew, they needed more eggs for decorating. The Krafts blew out almost all the eggs used in their household during the year and reused the eggs each year.

Between 1994 and 2009, the family hung an annual average of 700 new Easter eggs on the tree, but due to losses by storm and vandalism, the net annual average increase was 590 eggs. In 2012 there were over 10,000 eggs on the Easter egg tree, and Kraft said that he would not try to hang more. The tree in Saalfeld does not hold the record for the most eggs on one tree. That honor belongs to the Rostock Zoo, which in April 2007 decorated a red oak with 79,596 blown and painted eggs, which earned it an entry in Guinness World Records.

In 1995, a ver.di training center was built in the immediate vicinity, bringing more visitors and national fame to the Kraft Easter egg tree. Beginning in 2003 newspapers from the Netherlands, Kuwait, Austria, Spain, Australia, Thailand, US, and South Africa began reporting on the Kraft Easter egg tree. Crowds of visitors have continuously come since then. The entrance is free, but for curiosity the visitors were counted in 2011 as about 8,000.

=== Decoration ===
Depending on the weather and the date of Easter, the family begins hanging eggs on the tree between late February and late March, roughly four weeks before Easter. In 2009 it took them nine days to decorate the tree; the task involved family members, especially Volker Kraft, his wife Christa, and daughter Gabriela Rumrich. They use ladders to reach the heights of the tree, and hang the eggs working from the inside near the trunk to outside of the tree branches, and from top to bottom. They remove the eggs before the leaves grow to prevent damage to the tree.

=== Design of the eggs ===
All eggs are mouth-blown. Some are sprayed with one or more multicolored patterns. Some eggs are painted with motifs found in the city, such as the city gates or the home-museum, but world-famous buildings are also used as motifs. Many eggs are covered in crochet and protected against further weathering. New themes are used every year. They perforate some eggs for decoration, and others are enhanced with clay for transformation to shapes such as frogs, turtles, hedgehogs, and hot air balloons.

Some visitors bring their own eggs and donate them to the tree, and eggs from foreign countries are represented. Especially precious eggs are shown in a protective display case.

=== Closure in 2015 and legacy ===
According to the official website, 2015 is the final year of the Saalfelder Ostereierbaum, as per the following announcement: "The garden will remain closed from 07.04.2015 forever."

As of early 2016, most of the eggs were given away to a local entity which plans to decorate a different tree in the Schlosspark in Saalfeld. However, the Kraft and Rumrich families won't be participating anymore.

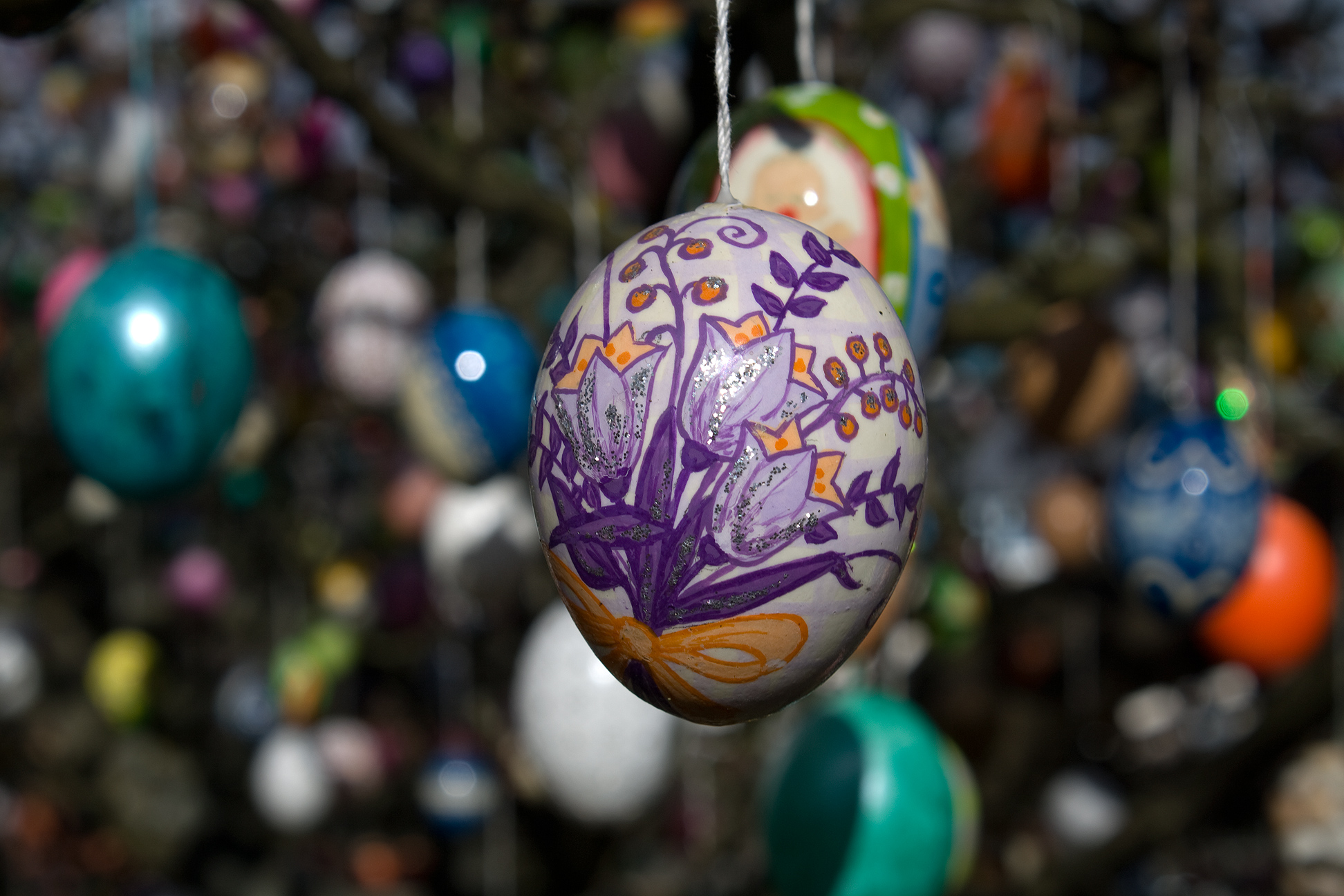
Egg with plant drawings

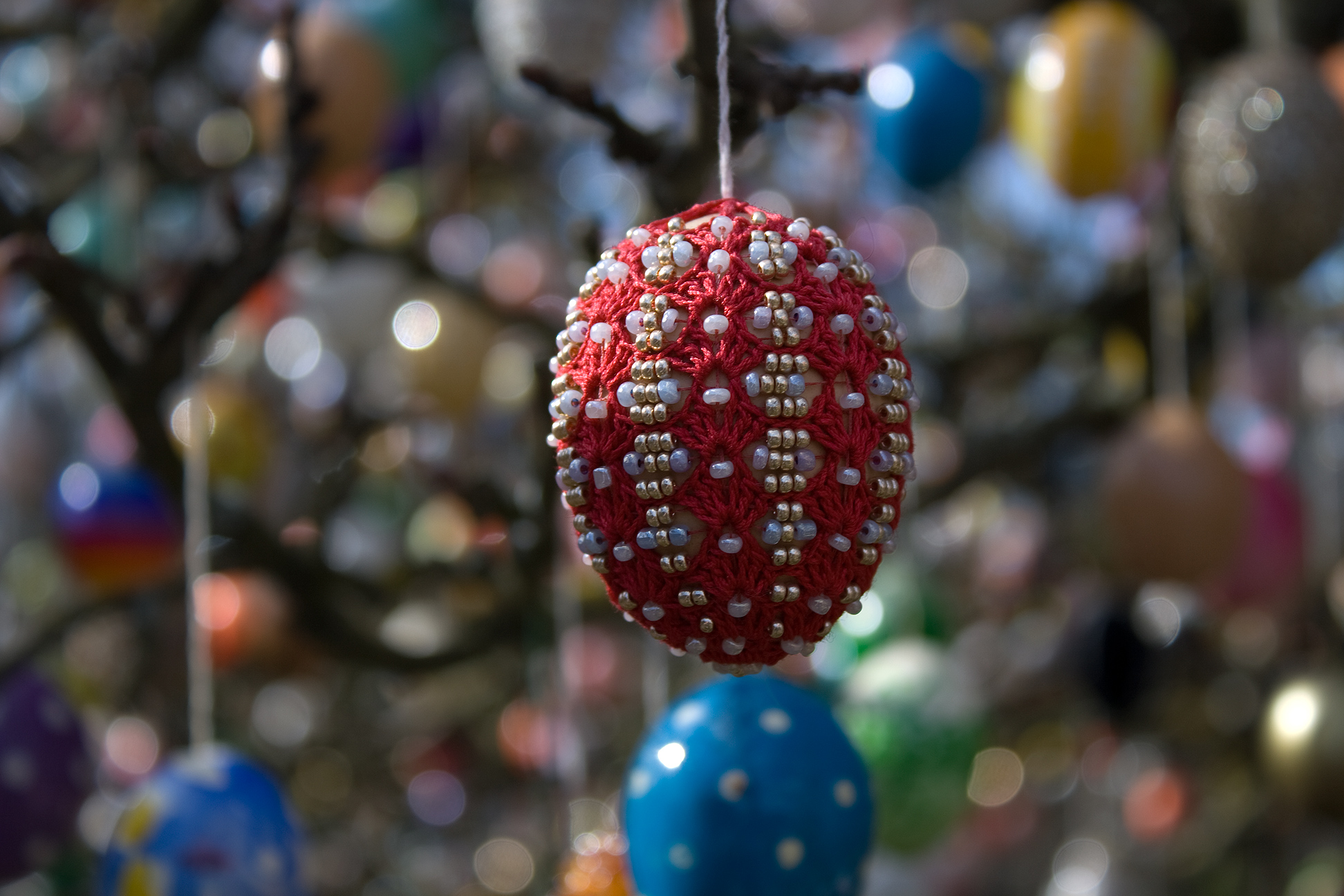
Crocheted egg

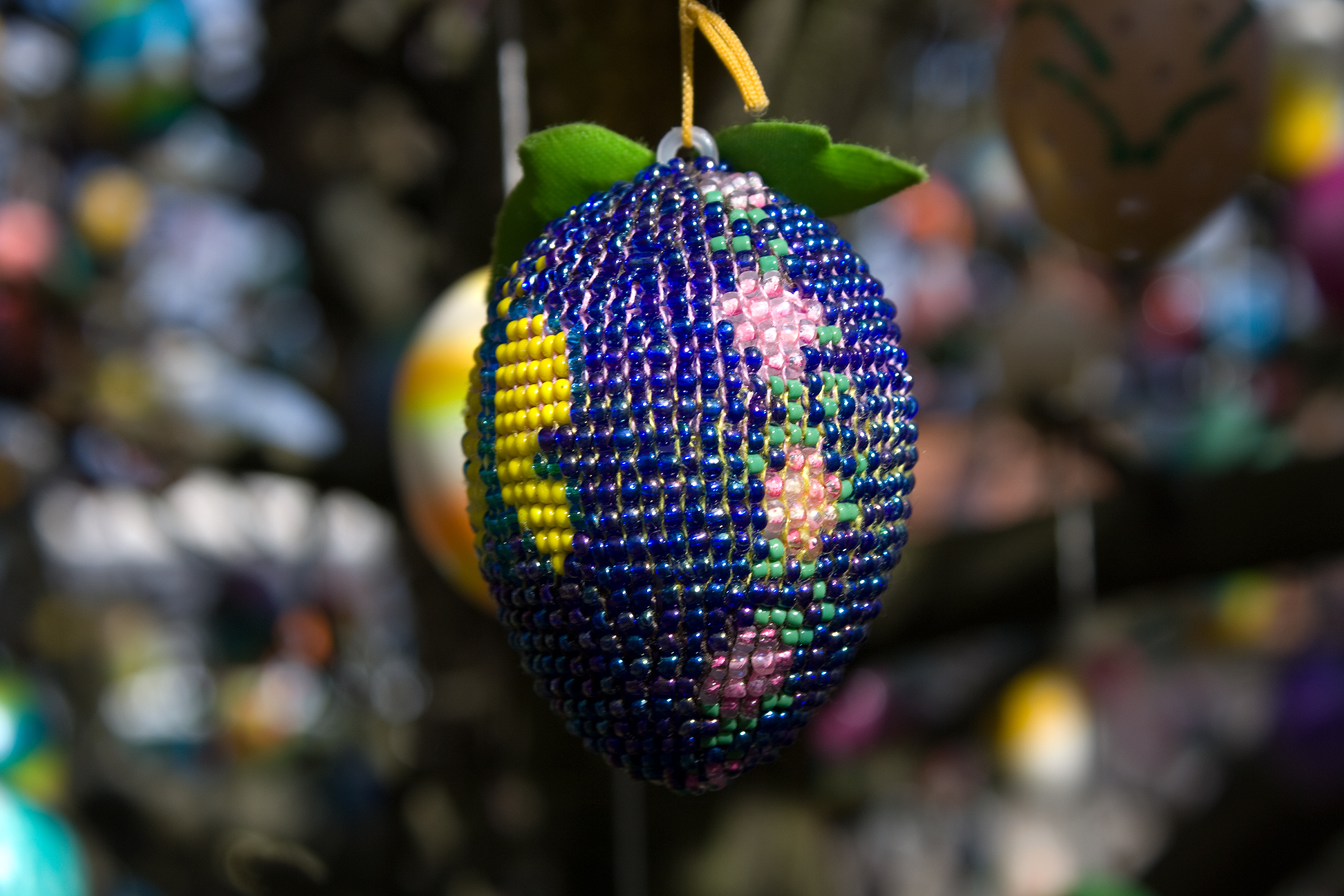
Pearl egg

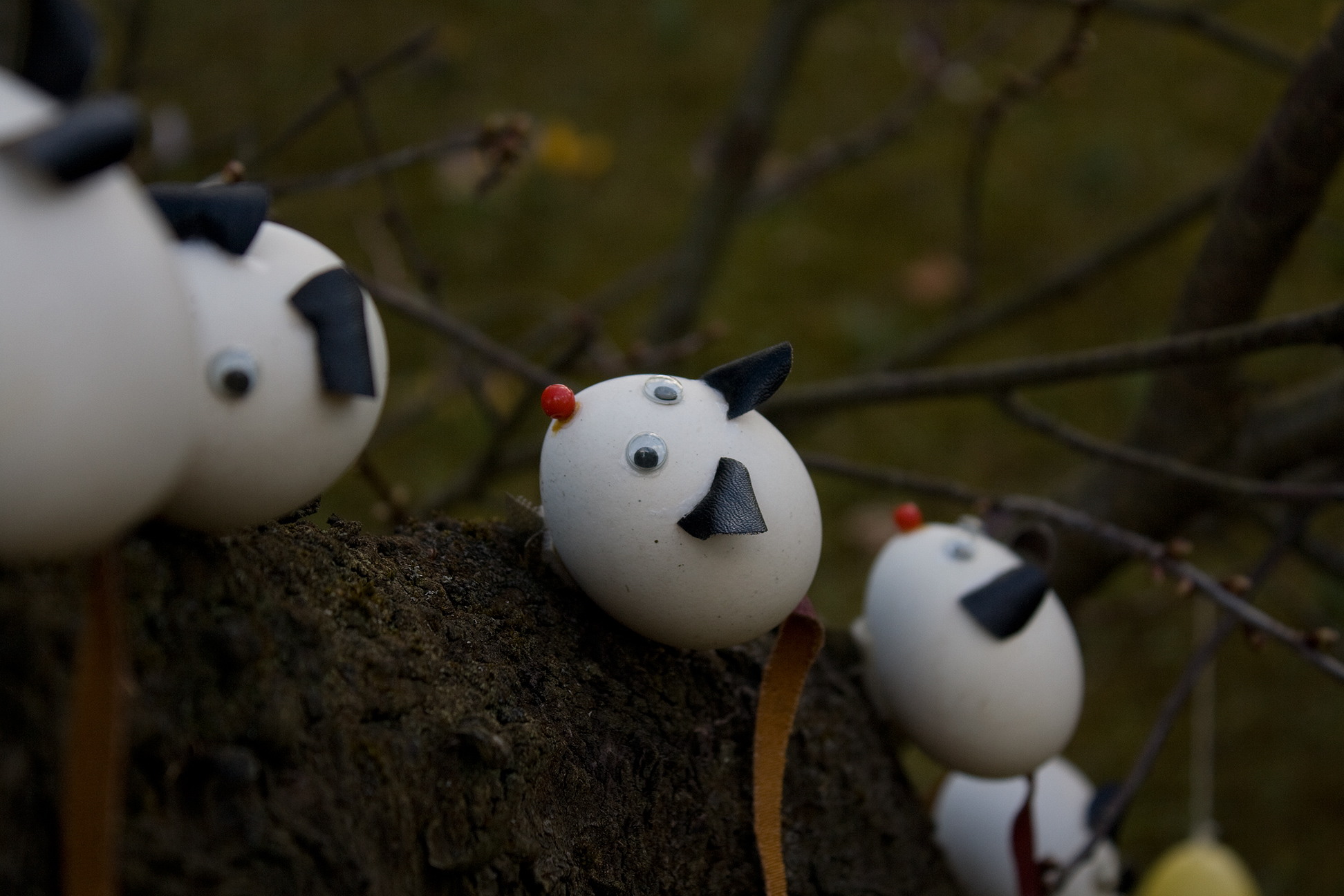
Egg-mice

== Other uses ==
There is also evidence of egg trees being used for purposes other than Easter commemoration.

By all odds the most striking barrier against witches is the so-called egg tree. Usually it is just a little dead bush with the branches closely trimmed, and literally covered with carefully blown egg shells. There are hundreds of egg shells on a really fine egg tree, which often requires years to perfect. It is set firmly in the ground near the cabin, a favorite place being under a big cedar in the front yard. Just how the egg tree is supposed to drive off witches I was never able to learn.

== See also ==
- Shoe tree
- Panty tree
- Christmas tree
