= Easter egg (disambiguation) =

An Easter egg is a decorated egg used to celebrate Easter and a symbol of renewal.

Easter egg, The Easter Egg, or Easter eggs may also refer to:

== Computing and media ==
- Easter egg (media), an intentional inside joke, hidden message, or secret feature in a work of media

== Lists of Easter eggs ==
- List of Google Easter eggs
- List of Easter eggs in Microsoft products
- List of Easter eggs in Tesla products

== Arts and entertainment ==
- Easter Eggs (film), a 2021 animated short film by Nicolas Keppens
- The Easter Egg, a 2010 children's picture book by Jan Brett
- "The Easter Egg", a short story by Saki from the 1911 collection The Chronicles of Clovis

== See also ==
- Egg (disambiguation)
- Easter Yeggs, a 1947 Looney Tunes animated short starring Bugs Bunny
- Easter egg tree, a German tradition of decorating trees with eggs
- Fabergé egg, a jeweled egg created by the House of Fabergé
- Egg decorating in Slavic culture, includes egg decorating in Pagan, Christian, and Ukrainian cultures
