= Vegetation deity =

Nature deity who embodies the growth cycle of plants

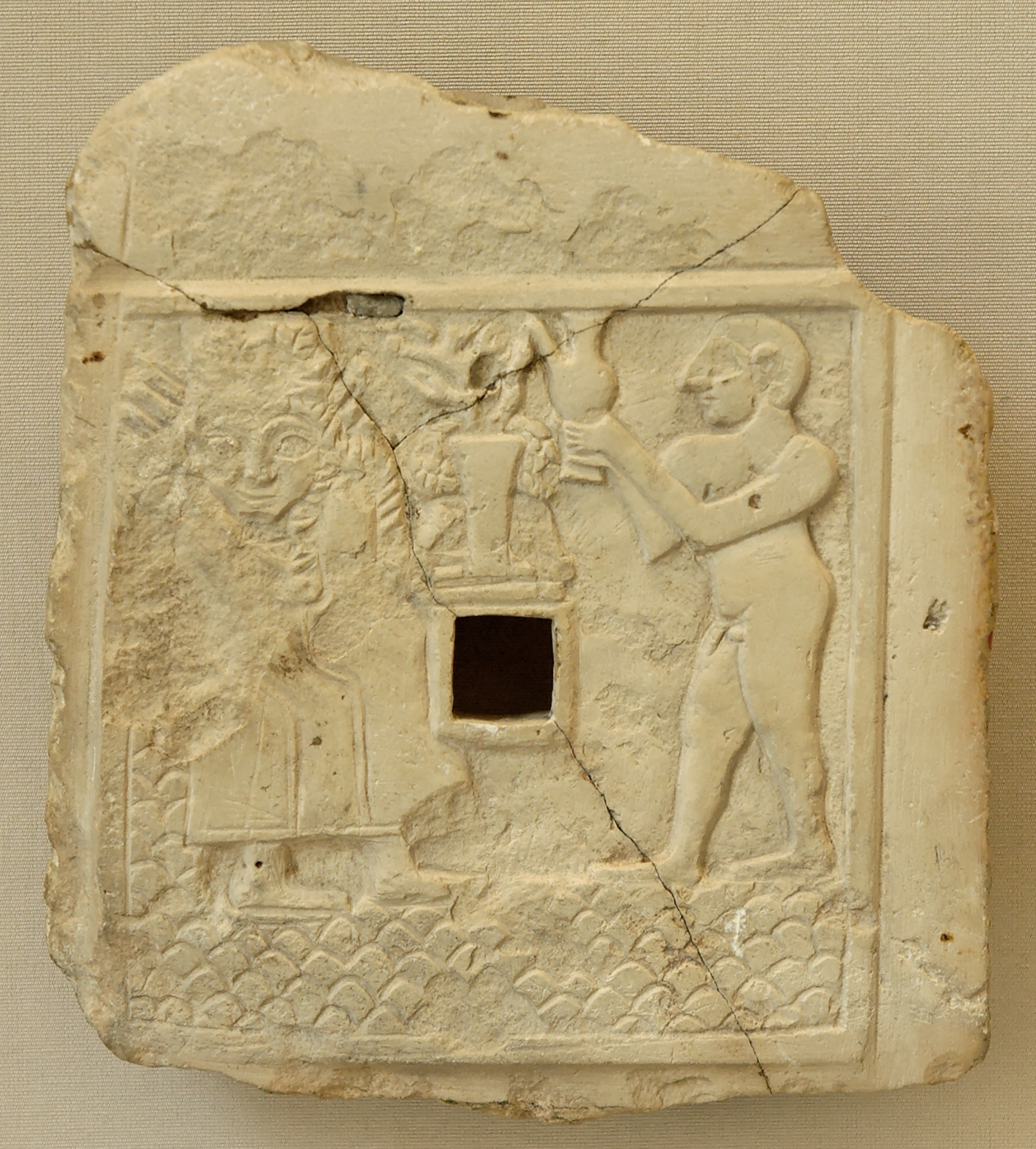
Relief of libation to a vegetation goddess (ca. 2500 BC) found in ancient Girsu, at the Louvre.

A vegetation deity is a nature deity whose disappearance and reappearance, or life, death and rebirth, embodies the growth cycle of plants. In nature worship, the deity can be a god or goddess with the ability to regenerate itself. A vegetation deity is often a fertility deity. The deity typically undergoes dismemberment (see sparagmos), scattering, and reintegration, as narrated in a myth or reenacted by a religious ritual. The cyclical pattern is given theological significance on themes such as immortality, resurrection, and reincarnation. Vegetation myths have structural resemblances to certain creation myths in which parts of a primordial being's body generate aspects of the cosmos, such as the Norse myth of Ymir.

In mythography of the 19th and early 20th century, as for example in The Golden Bough of J.G. Frazer, the figure is related to the "corn spirit", "corn" in this sense meaning grain in general. That triviality is giving the concept its tendency to turn into a meaningless generality, as Walter Friedrich Otto remarked of trying to use a "name as futile and yet pretentious as 'Vegetation deity'".

== Examples of vegetation myths ==
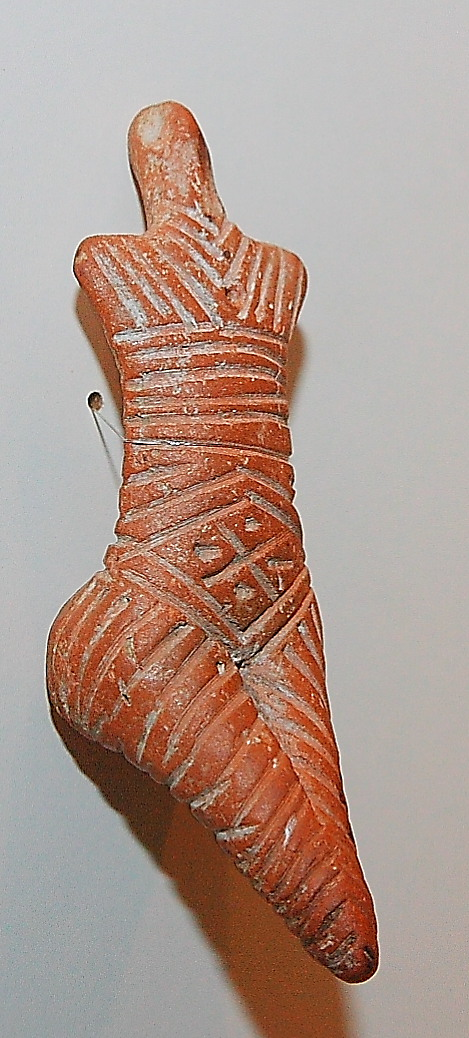
Cucuteni-Trypillian figurine with a sown field pattern

In the Mesopotamian tradition, during the journey of Inanna or Ishtar to the underworld, the earth becomes sterile, and neither humans nor animals are able to procreate. After confronting Ereshkigal, her sister and ruler of the underworld, Inanna is killed, but an emissary from the gods administers potions to restore her to life. She is allowed to return to the upper world only if someone else will take her place. Her husband, the vegetation god Dumuzi, agrees to spend half the year in the underworld, during which time vegetation dies off. His return brings regrowth.

In ancient Egyptian religion, the cultural achievements of Osiris among the peoples of the earth provokes the envy of his brother Set, who kills and dismembers him. Osiris's wife Isis makes a journey to gather his fourteen scattered body parts. In some versions, she buries each part where she finds it, causing the desert to put forth vegetation. In other versions, she reassembles his body and resurrects him, and he then becomes the ruler of the afterlife.

In European folklore, a woman's fertility has an influence on farming. Vegetation goddess figurines from the Cucuteni-Trypillian culture have a lozenge and dot pattern that represents a sown field and female fertility. The death of vegetation is also associated with the travel to the underworld of Ningishzida.

== List of vegetation deities ==
Other examples of vegetation deities include:

- Adonis (Greek)
- Attis (Greek)
- Baʿal (Canaanite)
- zh:百花仙子, Goddess of Flowers (Chinese)
- Blodeuwedd (Welsh)
- Ceres (Roman)
- Cronus (Greek)
- Demeter (Greek)
- Dionysus (Greek)
- Jarilo (Slavic)
- Modron (Welsh)
- Mother Nature (global)
- Ningishzida (Mesopotamian)
- Opora (Greek)
- Osiris (Egyptian)
- Pachamama (Incan)
- Persephone (Greek)
- Phouoibi (Meitei)
- Proserpina (Roman)
- Rauni (Finnish)
- Saturn (Roman)
- Tammuz (Mesopotamian)
- Xipe Totec (Aztec)
- Trà and Uất Lũy, Gods of Peach Blossom (Vietnamese)

== See also ==
- Apple Tree Man
- Dying god
- Earth mother
- Feldgeister, German corn spirits
- Greek primordial deities
- Green Man
- List of tree deities
- Myth and ritual
- Plant soul
- Puer aeternus
- Sky father
- Baal Cycle
