= Apple Wassail =

Form of wassailing

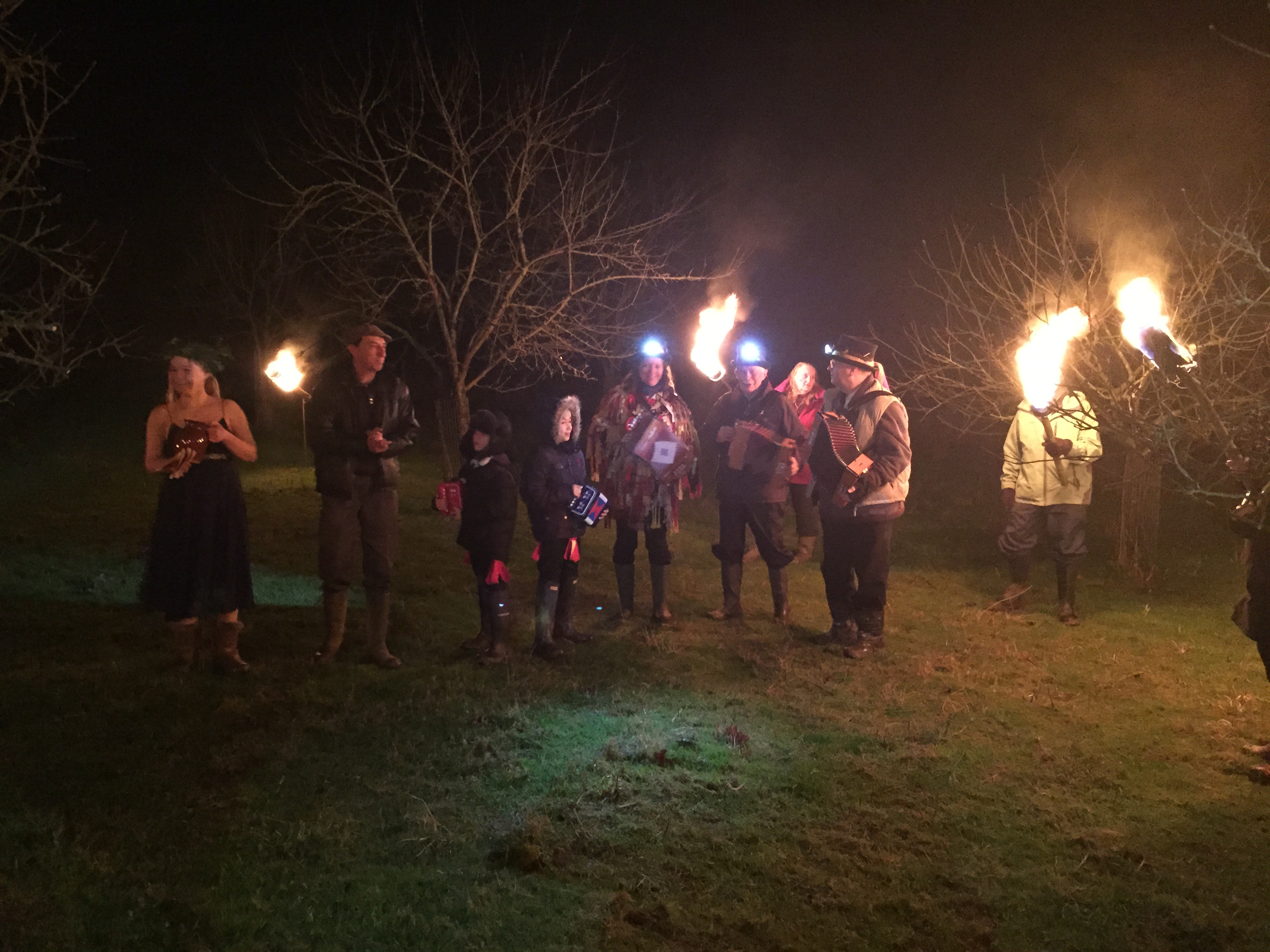
Apple wassail at Saltram House in Devon, England

The Apple Wassail or Orchard Wassail is a traditional form of wassailing practiced in the cider orchards of Southern England during the winter, on either Twelfth Night (5 or 6 January) or Old Twelfth Night ("Old Twelvey", 17 January). There are many well recorded instances of the Apple Wassail in the early modern period. The first recorded mention was at Fordwich, Kent, in 1585, by which time groups of young men would go between orchards performing the rite for a reward. Among the most famous wassail ceremonies are those in Whimple, Devon and Carhampton, Somerset, both on Old Twelfth Night, 17 January. The practice was sometimes referred to as "howling".

There are also many new revival wassails springing up all over the West Country and further afield, such as those in Stoke Gabriel and Sandford, Devon. Clevedon in north Somerset holds an annual Wassailing event in the Clevedon Community Orchard, combining the traditional elements of the festival with the entertainment and music of the Bristol Morris Men and their Horse. The Blackhand Cyder Society in the village of Denton, Norfolk has developed its own version with a local maiden performing the blessing.

== Etymology ==
The word 'Wassail' comes from the Old English phrase 'was hál', meaning 'be well'.

== Customs ==
On either Twelfth Night (5 or 6 January) or Old Twelfth Night ("Old Twelvey", 17 January), men would go with their wassail bowl into the orchard and go about the trees. Slices of bread or toast were laid at the roots and sometimes tied to branches. Cider was also poured over the tree roots, and sometimes over the toast. Then they would make lots of noise, singing, banging pots and pans together, and firing off guns, to scare away any malignant spirits in the orchard. Many festivities also include morris dancing. The ceremony is said to "bless" the trees to produce a good crop in the forthcoming season.

A folktale from Somerset reflecting this custom tells of the Apple Tree Man, the spirit of the oldest apple tree in an orchard, and in whom the fertility of the orchard is thought to reside. In the tale a man offers his last mug of mulled cider to the trees in his orchard and is rewarded by the Apple Tree Man who reveals to him the location of buried gold.

== Wassailing songs ==
There are many traditional songs associated with apple wassailing, but the “Apple Tree Wassail” (Roud 209) is probably the most famous. Prominent recordings include ones by The Watersons (1975), John Kirkpatrick (1995), Boiled in Lead (2008), Jon Boden (2016), The Dreadnoughts (2023), and Oli Steadman (2024).

== Traditional apple wassail rhymes ==
Here's to thee, old apple tree,
Whence thou mayst bud
And whence thou mayst blow!
And whence thou mayst bear apples enow!
Hats full! Caps full!
Bushel—bushel—sacks full,
And my pockets full too! Huzza!

— South Hams of Devon, 1871

Huzza, Huzza, in our good town
The bread shall be white, and the liquor be brown
So here my old fellow I drink to thee
And the very health of each other tree.
Well may ye blow, well may ye bear
Blossom and fruit both apple and pear.
So that every bough and every twig
May bend with a burden both fair and big
May ye bear us and yield us fruit such a stors
That the bags and chambers and house run o'er.

— Cornworthy, Devon, 1805

Stand fast root, bear well top
Pray the God send us a howling good crop.
Every twig, apples big.
Every bough, apples now.

— 19th century Sussex, Surrey

Apple-tree, apple-tree,
Bear good fruit,
Or down with your top
And up with your root.

— 19th century S. Hams.

Bud well, bear well
God send you fare well;
Every sprig and every spray
A bushel of apples next New Year Day.

— 19th century Worcestershire

Here we come a wassailing
Among the leaves so green,
Here we come a wandering
So fair to be seen.
Love and joy come to you,
And to you your wassail too,
And God bless you and send you a happy New Year.
And God send you a happy New Year.

— Somerset, 1871

Henry David Thoreau also describes the tradition in "Wild Apples."

== See also ==
- Apple Day
- Wassail
- Wassailing
- Wish Tree
