= Apple Day =

Annual celebration day in the UK

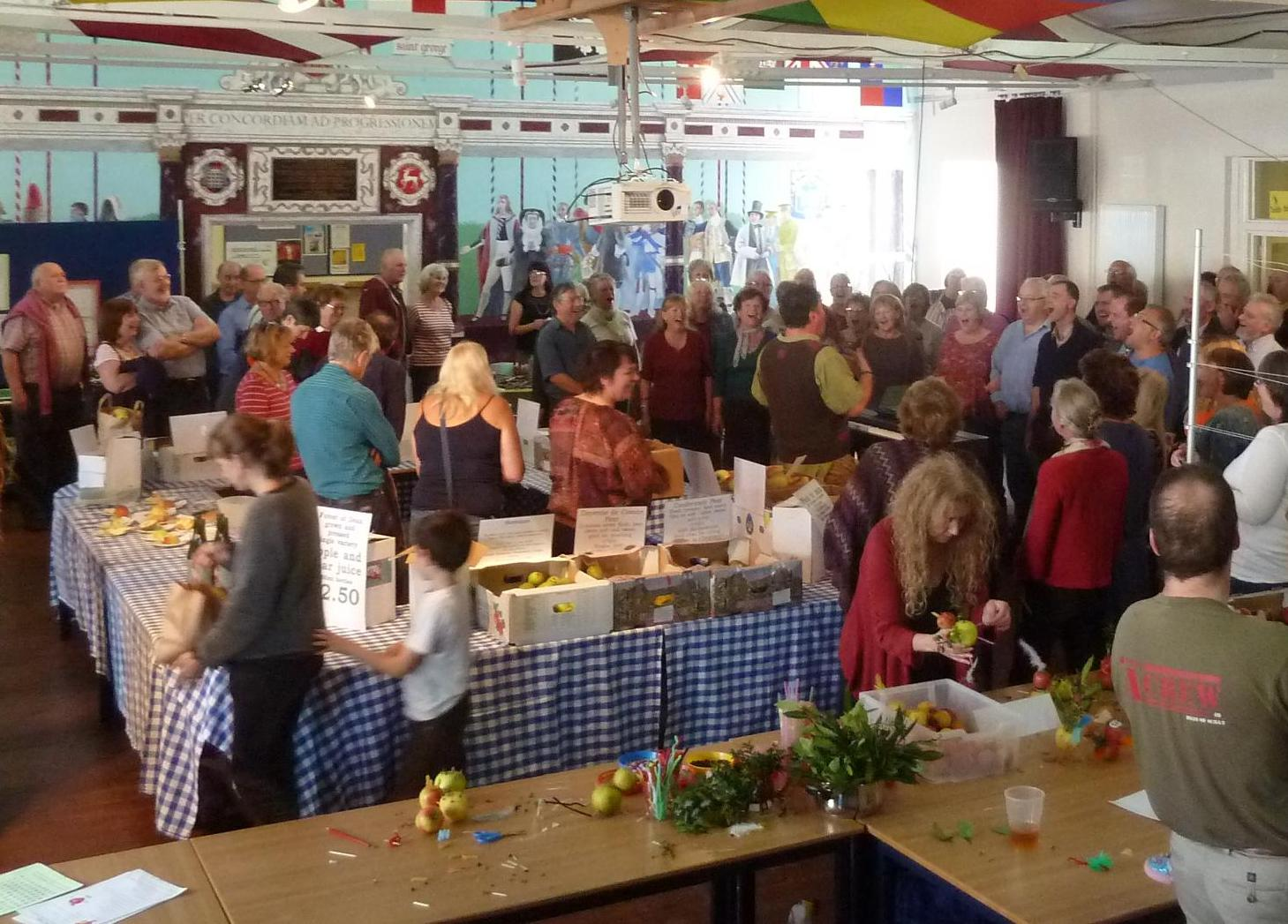
Chepstow Apple Day 2014, featuring obscure apple varieties for sale, apple carving, apple peeling contests and a singing club

Apple Day is an annual celebration of apples and orchards, held in October. It is celebrated mainly in the United Kingdom. It traditionally falls on 21 October, the date of the first such event in 1990, but events are held throughout the month. It is commonly a weekend event, usually taking place on the Saturday and Sunday closest to 30 October.

Apple Day events can be large or small, from apple games in a garden to large village fairs with cookery demonstrations, games, apple identification, juice and cider, gardening advice, and the sale of many hundreds of apple varieties.

== History ==
Apple Day was initiated by Common Ground on 21 October 1990 at an event in Covent Garden, London, and has been celebrated in each subsequent year. By 2000 the day was celebrated in more than 600 events around the United Kingdom. Common Ground describe the day as a way of celebrating and demonstrating that variety and richness matter to a locality and that it is possible to effect change in your place. Common Ground has used the apple as a symbol of the physical, cultural and genetic diversity we should not let slip away. In linking particular apples with their place of origin, they hope that orchards will be recognized and conserved for their contribution to local distinctiveness, including the rich diversity of wild life they support. Apple Day is celebrated in October because August to November are usually the main time of year for apples during the autumn season, especially in the Northern Hemisphere.

== Media ==
"Apple Day" is the title of a song by UK songwriter Phil Baggaley, formerly of songwriting duo Phil and John, and founder of Gold Records. The song was sung by the Christian gospel group Harbour Lights (no longer extant) on their 2006 album "Leaving Safe Anchorage". The song refers to Apple Day - and likens the converting of old bruised apples into cider to spiritual renewal and invites the listener to participate with the words "Meet me down at Apple Day, come and bring the fruit that's fallen, we'll turn it into something new .."

Apple Day is celebrated by the villagers in the radio soap-opera The Archers.

== See also ==
- Apple Wassail
- Festive ecology
- Oak Apple Day, a May Day celebration
- Wassail
- Wassailing
