= Apple Tree Man =

Spirit in English folklore

In English folklore, the Apple Tree Man is the name given to the spirit of the oldest apple tree in an orchard, and in whom the fertility of the orchard is thought to reside. Tales about the Apple Tree Man were collected by the folklorist Ruth Tongue in the cider-producing county of Somerset. In one story a man offers his last mug of mulled cider to the trees in his orchard on Christmas Eve (a reflection of the custom and ritual of apple wassailing). He is rewarded by the Apple Tree Man who reveals to him the location of buried gold, more than enough to pay his rent.

In another tale a farm cat was curious to explore some fields that people avoided working because they were haunted by ghosts and witches. She set out one day and got as far as the orchard when the Apple Tree Man cautioned her to go back home, because folks were coming to pour cider for his roots and shoot guns to drive away the witches. He persuaded her not to go wandering around at night until St. Tibb's Eve, and she never did because she did not know when St. Tibb's Eve was, nor did anyone else.

== See also ==
- Apple (symbolism)
- Green Man
- Vegetation deity
- Wish tree
