= Osterbrunnen =

German Easter tradition

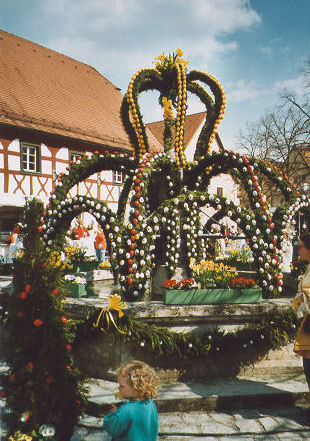
Osterbrunnen in Heiligenstadt

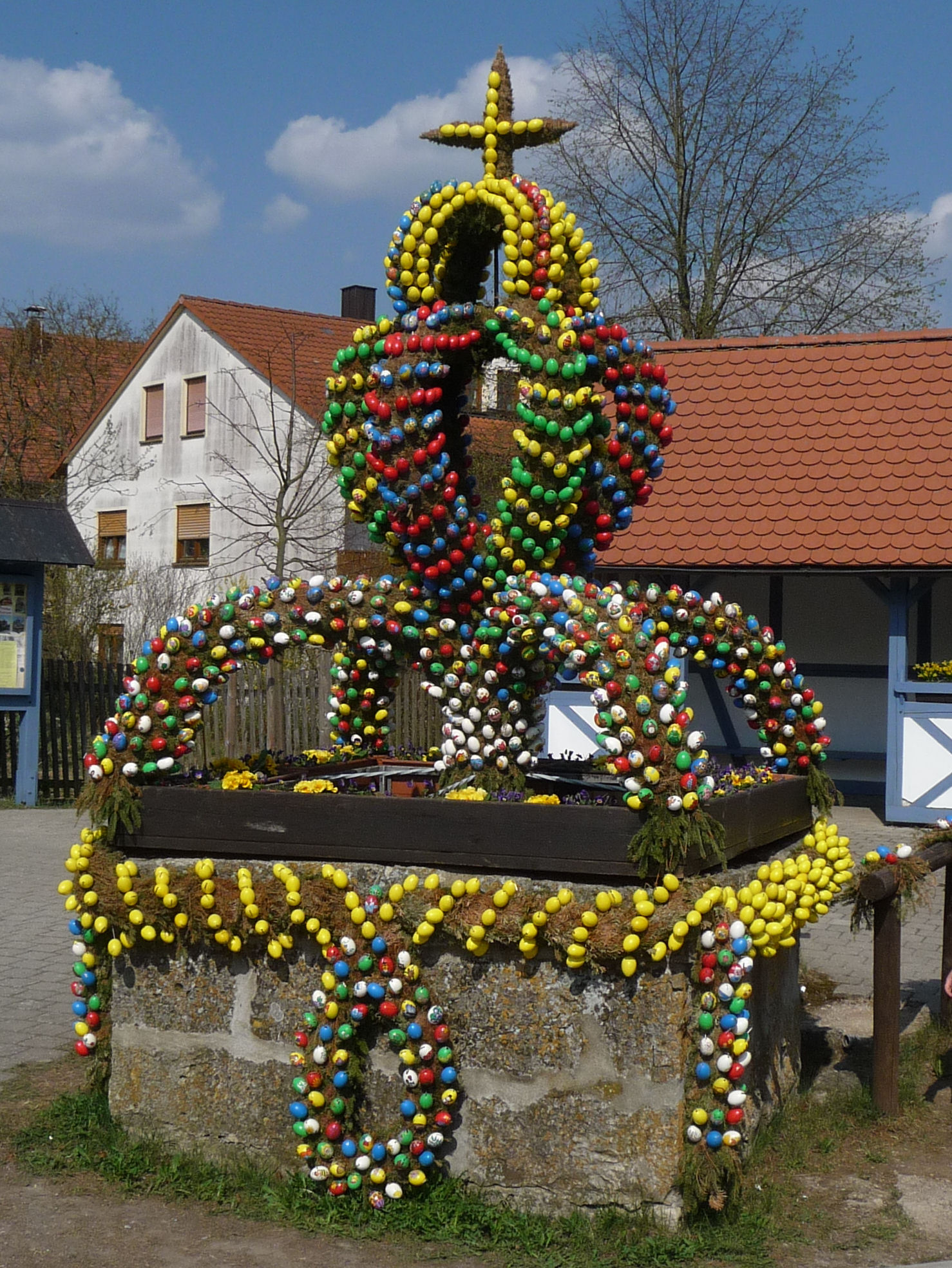
Osterbrunnen in Teuchatz

The Osterbrunnen (Easter Well or Easter Fountain) is a German tradition of decorating public wells or fountains with Easter eggs for Easter. It began in the early 20th century in the Franconian Switzerland region of Upper Franconia but has spread to other regions. The decoration is usually kept from Good Friday until two weeks after Easter.

== History ==
Decorating a well for Easter honours water, essential for life, and Easter, the feast of renewed life. In addition to eggs (now often artificial, to guard against vandalism), paper ribbons called "Pensala" and garlands of evergreens are woven around well-heads or formed into crowns over them. In several locations flowers are also used.

Franconian Switzerland (German: Fränkische Schweiz), so called for its rugged rock outcroppings, lies in the region of Upper Franconia in northern Bavaria. The tradition of Osterbrunnen began there in the early 20th century. The Osterbrunnen in Aufseß is said to have been first decorated around 1909; that in the village of Engelhardsberg has been dressed since 1913. After World War II, public wells became less important, reducing the amount of decoration. However, beginning in 1952, Dr. Kunstmann and his wife, of Nuremberg, worked to revive the tradition in Franconian Switzerland. During the 1980s the idea spread to other parts of Upper Franconia. The decorated wells became a tourist attraction; the wells in Heiligenstadt and Bieberbach are destinations for bus tours from cities such as Munich and Dresden. Heiligenstadt is visited by some 80 buses a day. The fountain in Bieberbach was listed in 2001 in the Guinness World Records for 11,108 hand-painted eggshells.

The tradition of the Osterbrunnen has also spread outside Franconia to Hesse and to the Steigerwald, to the valley of the Altmühl, to Saxony, to the Palatinate, to the Saarland and to Swabia.

== Possible origins ==
There was an old tradition throughout Germany of drawing water in silence at Easter for purification and medical treatment, which was sometimes referred to as Osterbrunnen. Wells were cleaned and decorated with garlands and sometimes eggs in May, a tradition which survived relatively late in the 19th century in Bacharach. Other dates for well decorating included Pentecost in southern Thuringia and Midsummer in Fulda; it took place at Easter in Bohemia. Nineteenth-century writers, particularly Karl Weinhold, suggested that these traditions of well cleaning and decorating were remnants of pre-Christian practices. In work first published in 1987, Claudia Schillinger has argued for a Wendish origin of the decoration of wells in Franconia.

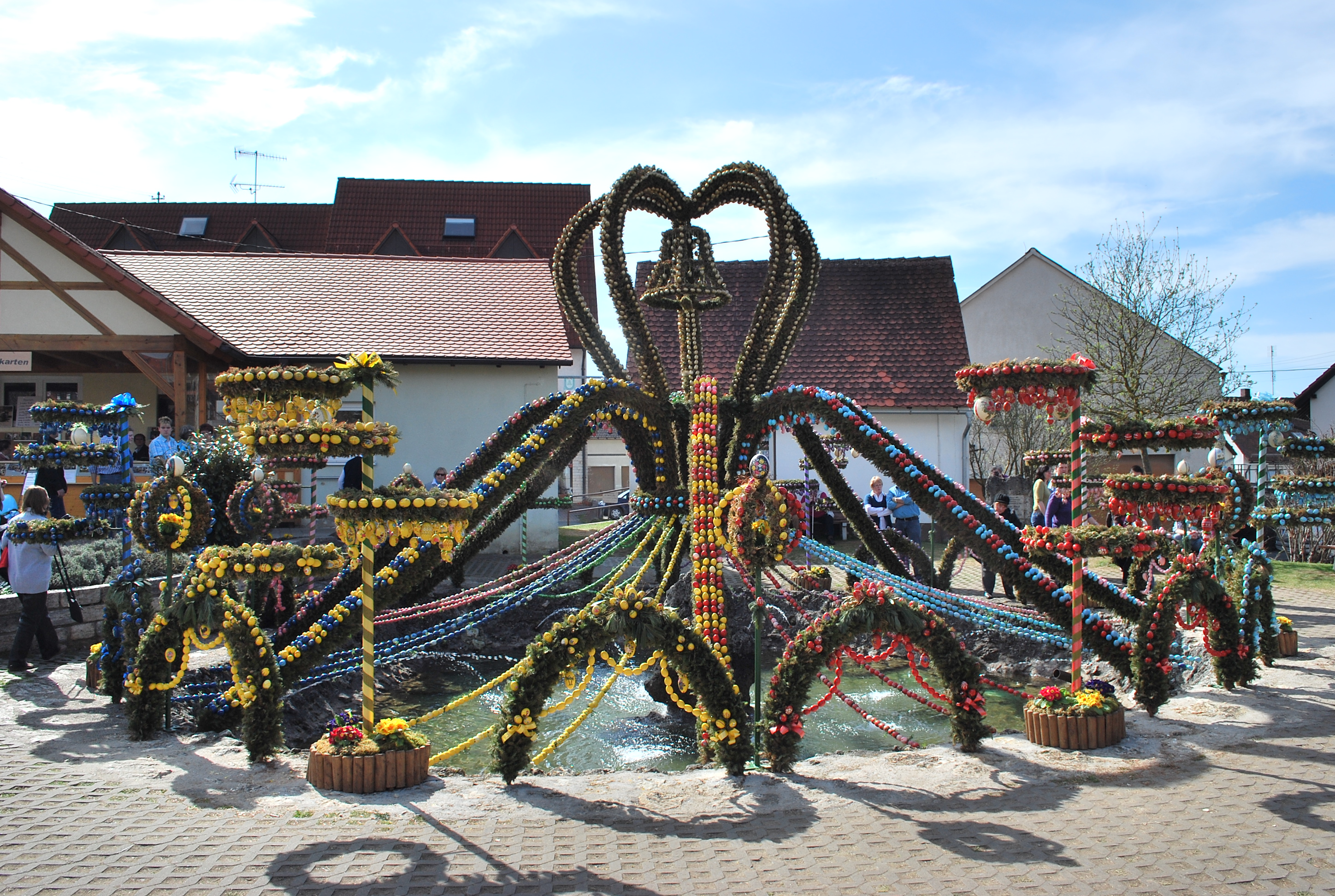
Osterbrunnen in Bieberbach (2010)

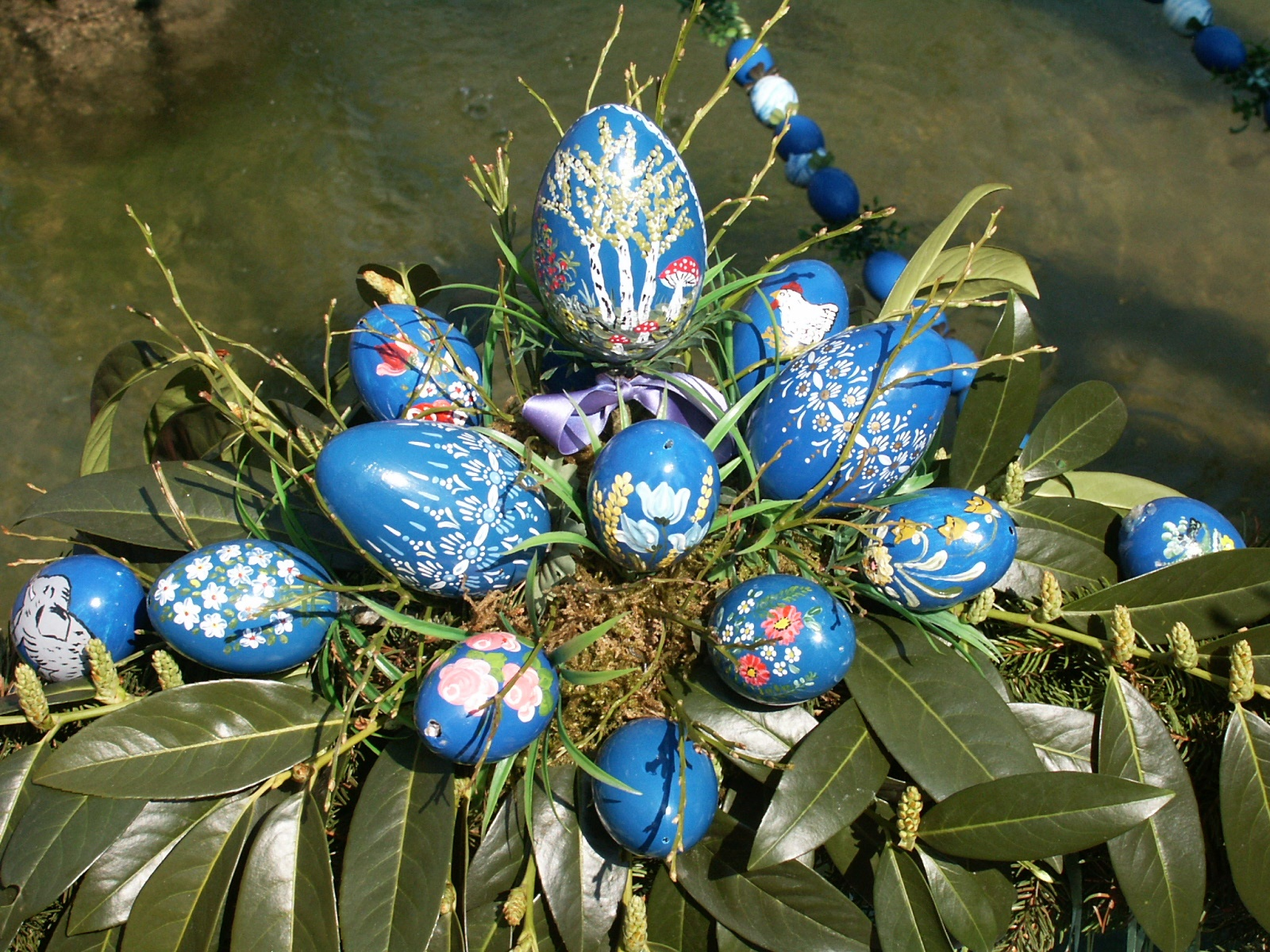
Painted eggs in Bieberbach (2004)

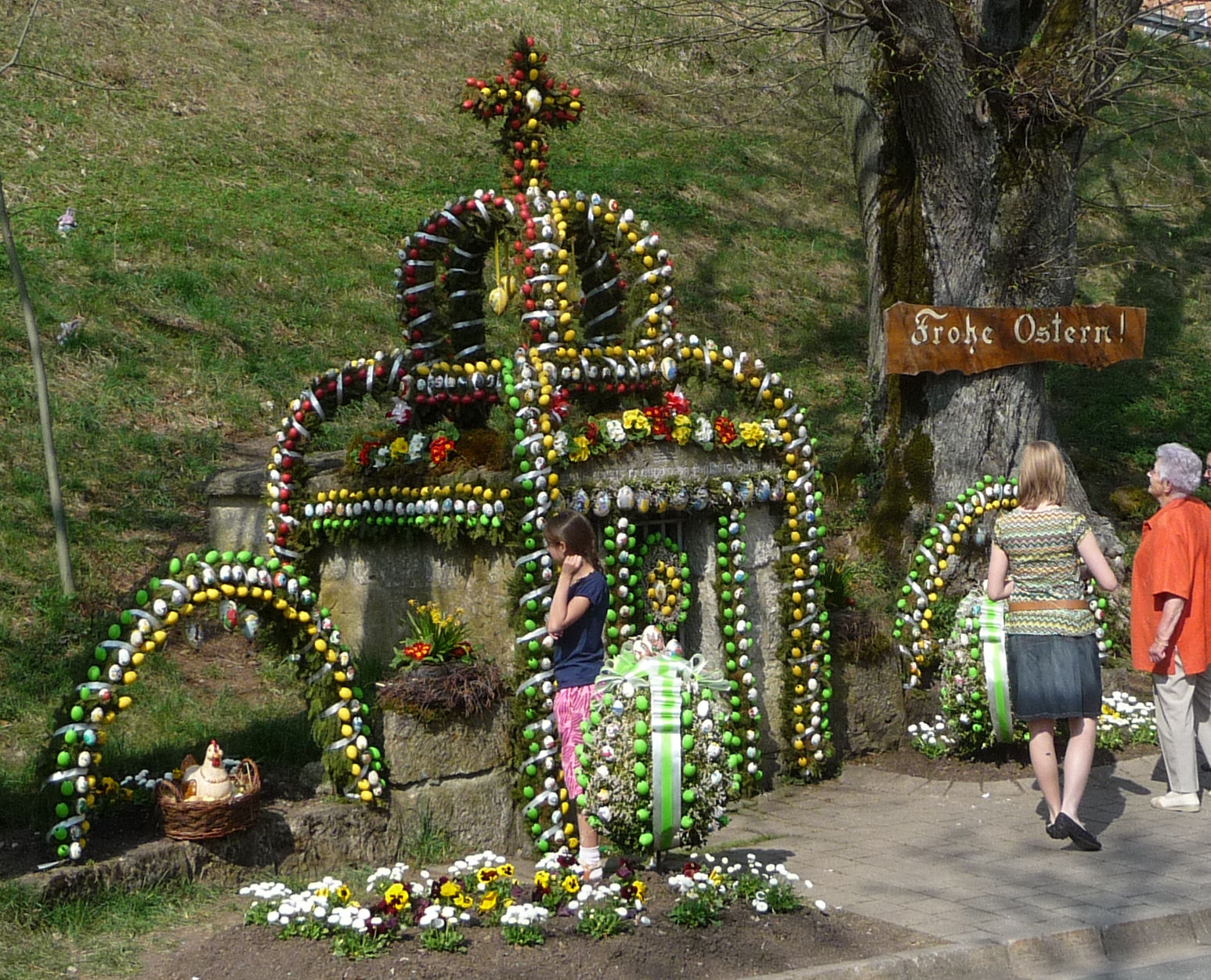
Osterbrunnen in Tiefenpölz (2009)

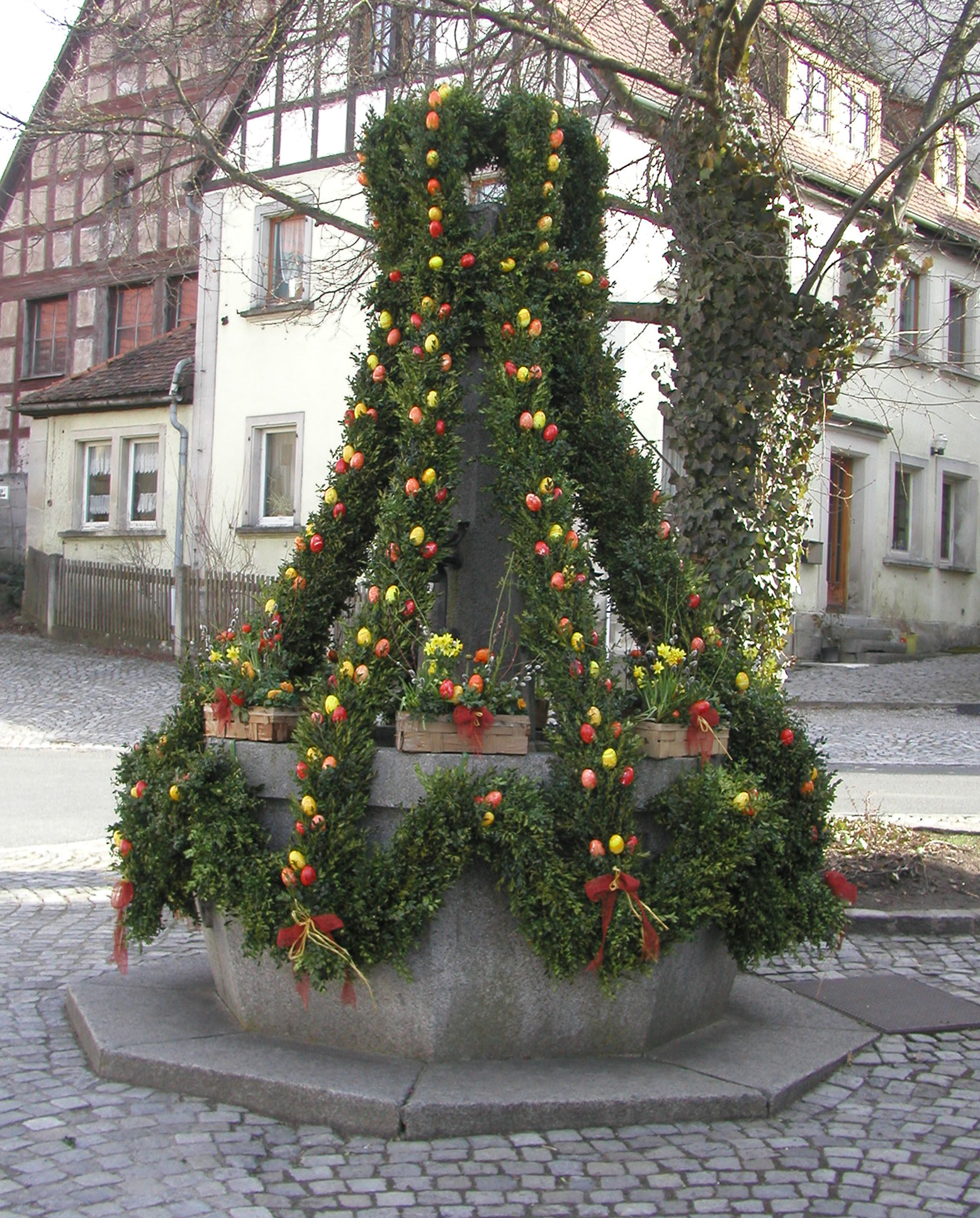
Osterbrunnen in Münchsteinach (2010)

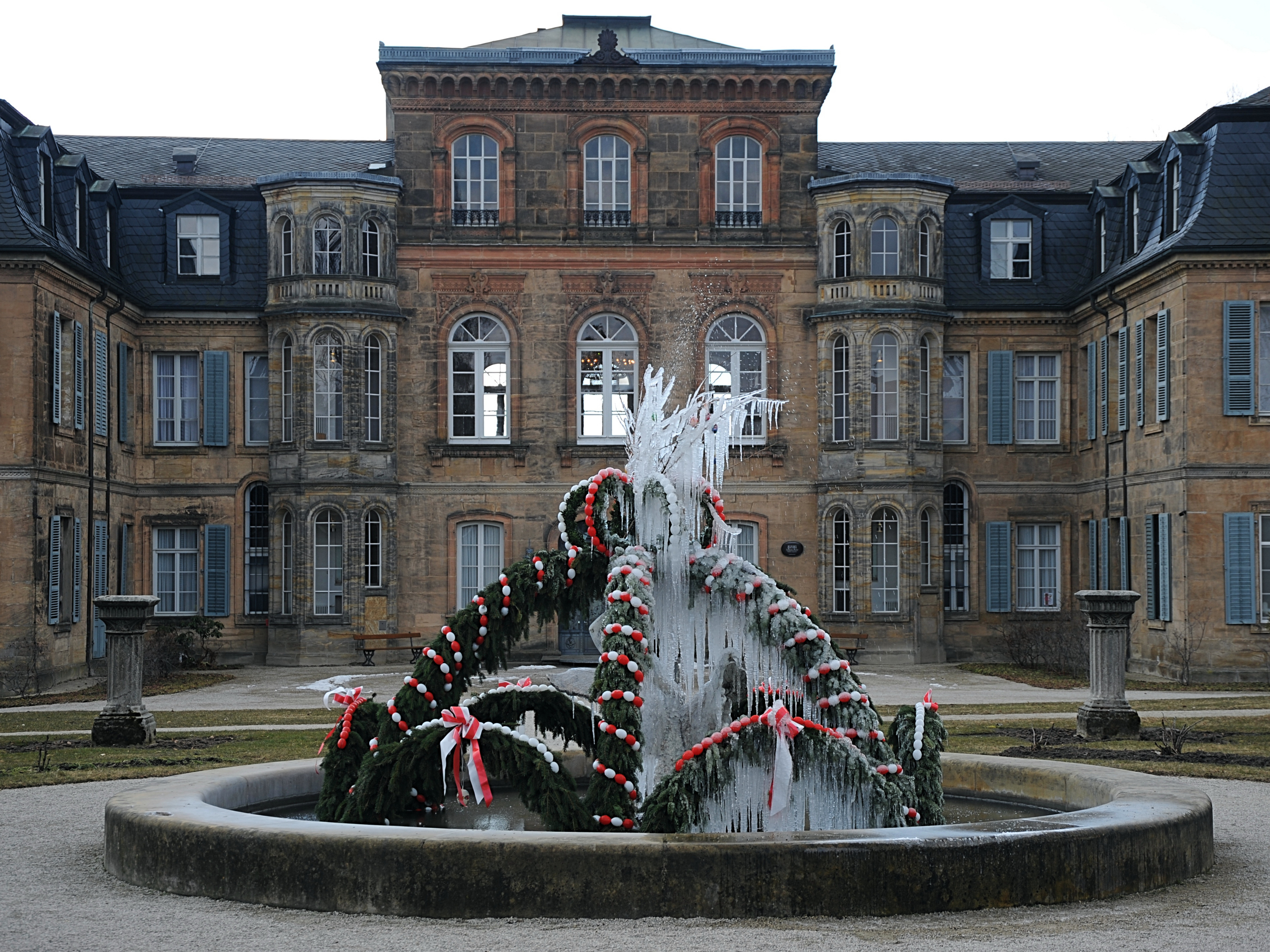
Easter Fountain in front of palace Fantaisie in Eckersdorf, district Bayreuth, Germany

== See also ==
- Well dressing
- Easter egg tree
