= Panty tree =

Tree adorned with women's underwear, commonly found below ski lifts

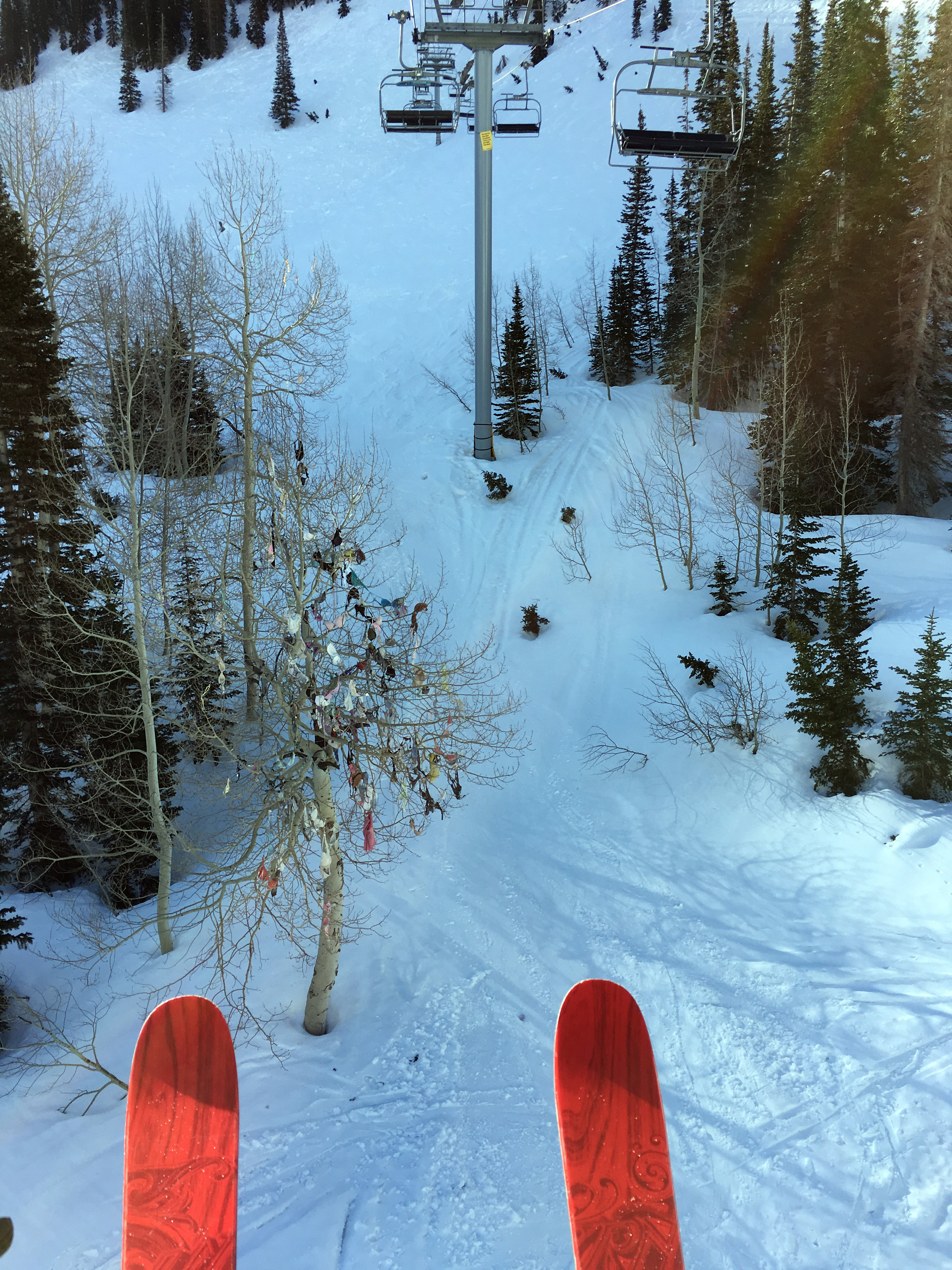
The panty/bra tree under the Gadzoom chairlift at Snowbird resort in Utah

A panty tree (or bra tree or bra/panty tree) is a tree underneath a ski lift decorated with bras, panties, and Mardi Gras beads cast off by skiers riding the chair lift.

== History ==
An experienced ski patroller in Aspen, Colorado, has claimed that the first panty tree was under the Bell Mountain ski lift at Aspen Mountain in the early 1980s. A discussion in 2006 in the letters pages of the Skiing Heritage journal said "it is believed" that the practice might have begun in the late 1950s. This panty tree was soon copied at nearby Vail Ski Resort and then numerous other ski areas across North America.

The first panty tree in Vail was found chopped down one morning in 1997, but skiers picked another tree to continue the tradition. This second tree was used in a 2005 liqueur company advertisement, which stated, "You just recognized a pair of panties in the Sun Down Bowl tree...The conversation is waiting." In 2010, this tree was also chopped down to make way for a new ski lift.

In 2012, a male grooming product company ran an advertising campaign on ski lifts across Canada that stated, "Please Feed the Bra Tree."

Several popular Canadian ski resorts have also ended up with bra trees, including Banff Sunshine Village, Lake Louise Ski Resort, and Camp Fortune, amongst many others.

== See also ==
- Panty raid
- Shoe tossing
- Shoe tree (decorated plant)
