= Shoe tree (decorated plant) =

Tree decorated with shoes

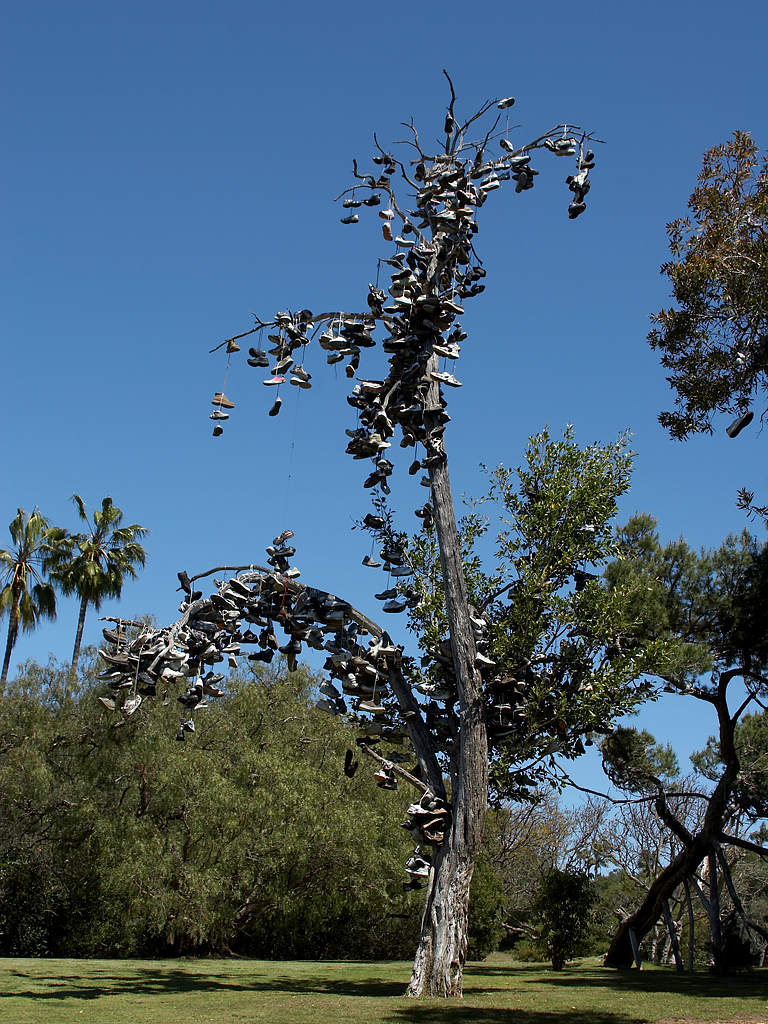
The Shoe Tree in Morley Field, San Diego. (Note: The Shoe Tree in Frisbee Playground, Morley Field, San Diego fell down (allegedly on January 7, 2008, confirmed the following day), caused by a long period of rain.)

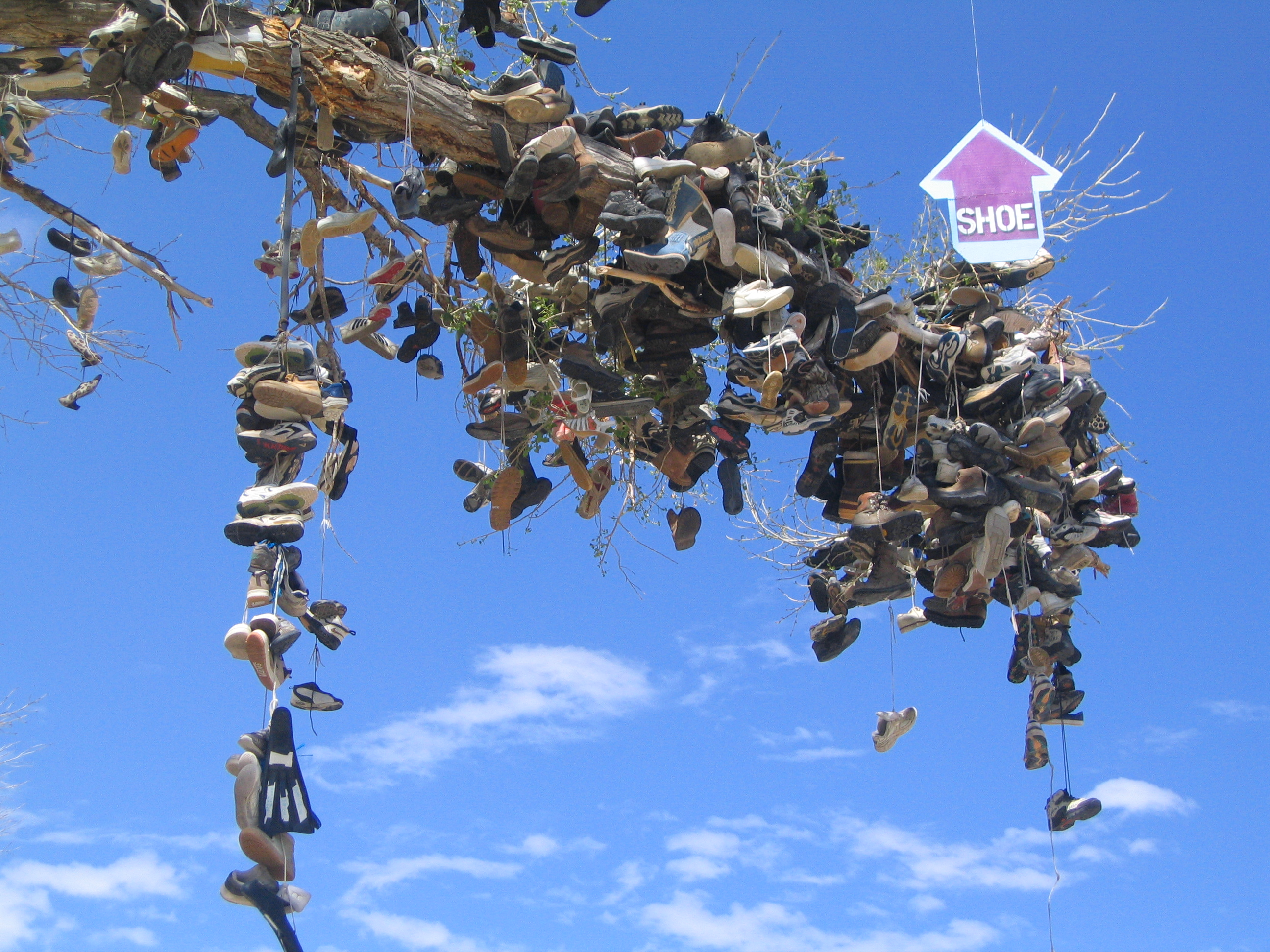
Branch of a shoe tree in Reno, Nevada

A shoe tree is a tree (or occasionally, a powerline pole or other wooden object) that has been festooned with old shoes, generally through the act of shoe tossing. Shoe trees are generally located alongside a major local thoroughfare, and may have a theme (such as high-heeled shoes). In 2017 there were at least forty-five such shoe trees in the United States.

The Mountain Crossings store on the Appalachian Trail, built in the 1930s, has a tree outside where hikers traditionally abandon their boots by hanging them up, after walking the trail.

== See also ==
- Panty tree
