= Parting stone =

A parting stone is a monument, usually of stone, to either:

1. Provide direction at a fork in the road—a parting of the way, or
2. Commemorate a final parting, as from a loved one.

== Directions ==
The 1744 Roxbury Parting Stone, fitted here with an iron stake from which a lantern could be hung

A directing parting stone shows where each leg of a road fork leads.

The earliest Massachusetts legislation pertaining to guide-posts was on February 28, 1795. In it, the selectmen were required to erect guide-posts at the corners and angles of all roads in their towns and districts, Before that time, some individuals had set up roadside stones marking the distance or direction to some important town.

Numerous such stones were set by Paul Dudley, Chief-Justice of Massachusetts, as they bear his name or initials. It was not uncommon for well-to-do eighteenth century men to place milestones by the roadside along main thoroughfares for the convenience of travelers.

One well known example of a Dudley stone is the Roxbury Parting Stone, known locally as simply the Parting Stone. It is located near the Norfolk House, at the corner of Centre and Roxbury Streets, on Eliot Square. On its front or easterly face is inscribed "The / Parting / Stone / 1744 / P Dudley", with the directions on the south and north faces of "to / Dedham / x Rhode / Island" and " to / Cambridge / Watertown" respectively.

== Memorials ==
A memorial parting stone may be erected, for example, at the departure point of a loved one's final journey. An example can be found in England's Lake District at Grisedale Tarn. Known as the Brothers Parting Stone, it marks the place at which William Wordsworth last saw his brother John. Hardwicke Rawnsley erected a stone in 1882 with the inscription:

Here did we stop; and here looked round
While each into himself descends,
For that last thought of parting Friends
That is not to be found.
Brother and friend, if verse of mine
Have power to make thy virtues known,
Here let a monumental Stone
Stand–sacred as a Shrine

== See also ==
- Boundary marker
- Ghost bike
- Roadside memorial
- Roxbury Parting Stone at WikiMedia Commons
