= Grisedale Tarn =

Lake in Cumbria, England

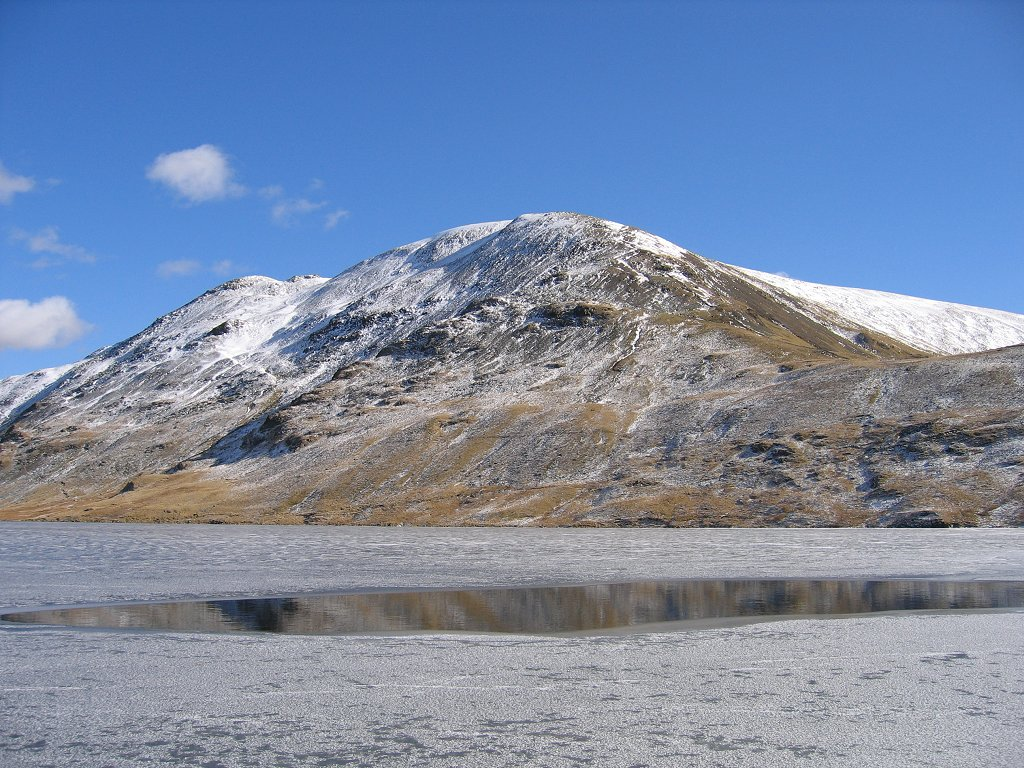
- Lake and St Sunday Crag

- Location in the Lake District National Park Location in Eden, Cumbria
- Location: Lake District, Cumbria
- Coordinates: 54°30′00″N 3°0′30″W
- Type: Tarn
- Basin countries: United Kingdom
- Surface area: 11 hectares (27 acres)

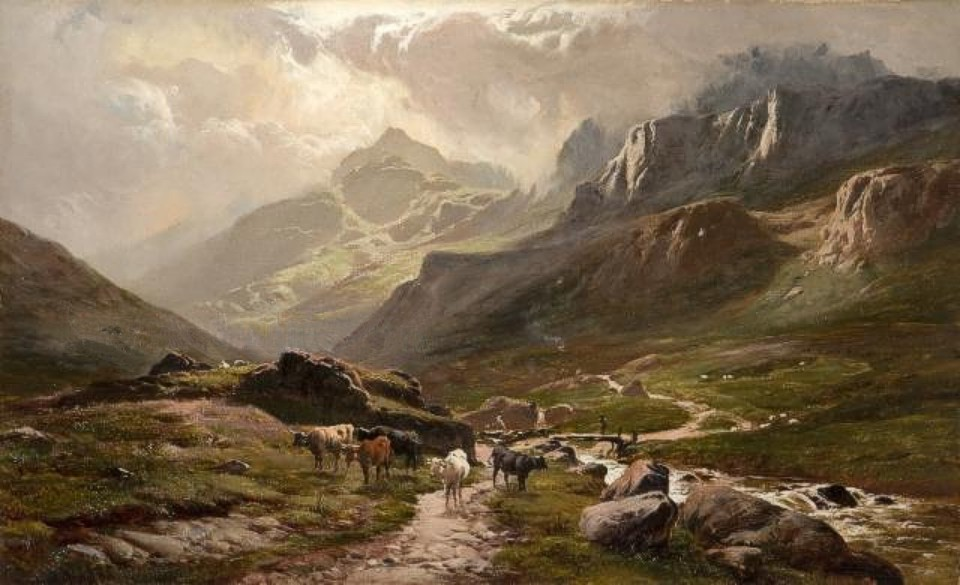
Grizedale (1883) by Sidney Richard Percy

Grisedale Tarn is a tarn in the Lake District of England between Fairfield and Dollywagon Pike.

It is the legendary resting place of the crown of the kingdom of Cumbria, after the crown was conveyed there in 945 by soldiers of the last king, Dunmail, after he was slain in battle with the combined forces of the English and Scottish kings.

Grisedale Tarn is 538 metres (1,765 ft) in altitude and has a maximum depth of around 33 metres (108 ft). It holds brown trout, perch and eels. The outflow is to Ullswater to the north-east, picking up all of the rainfall from the eastern face of Dollywagon Pike.

The Tarn is the subject of a poem by the Rev. Frederick William Faber printed in 1840.

== See also ==
- Grizedale
- Grizedale Forest
- Brothers Parting Stone
