= Milestone =

Numbered marker along a road or boundary

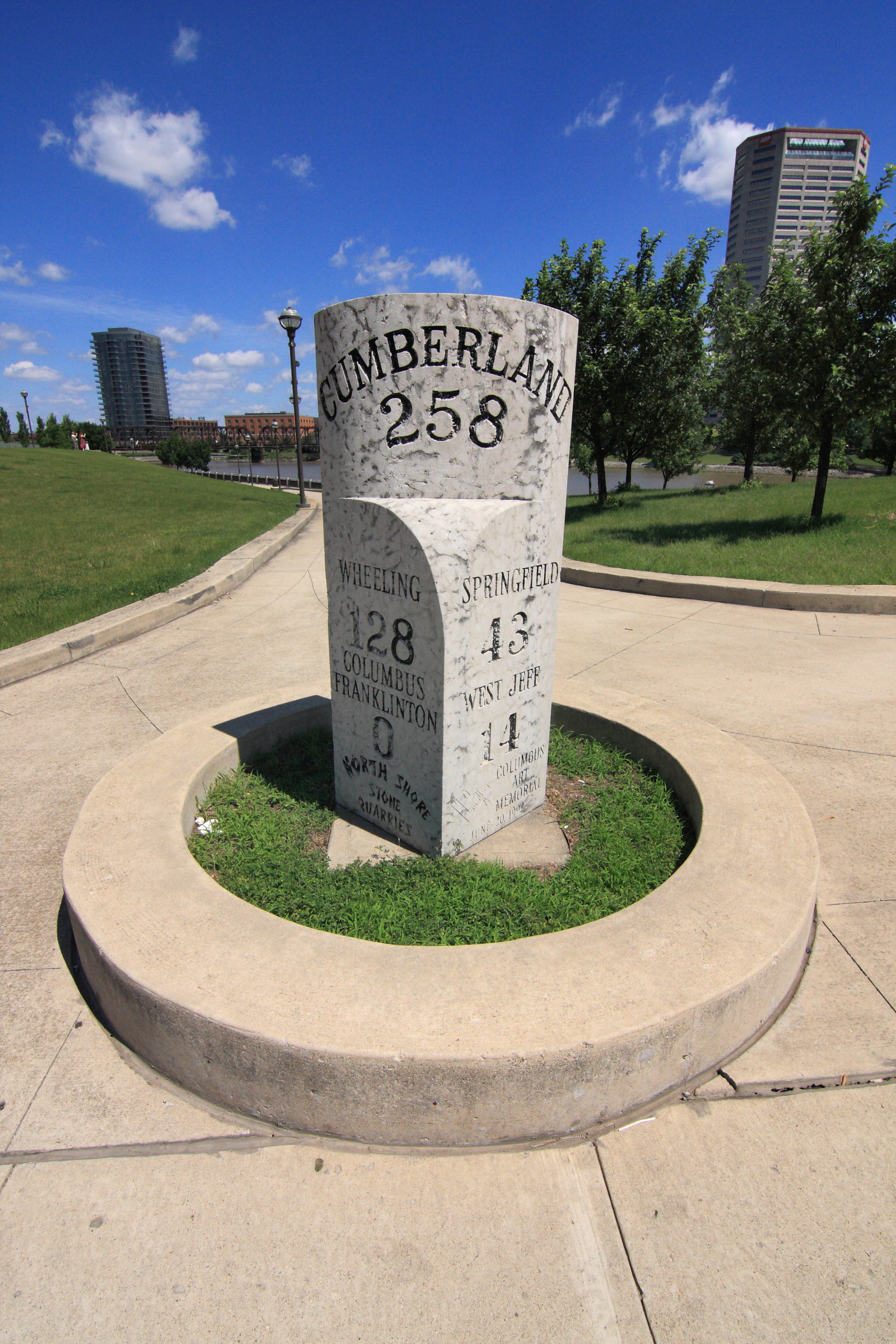
A mile marker on the U.S. National Road giving distances from many places

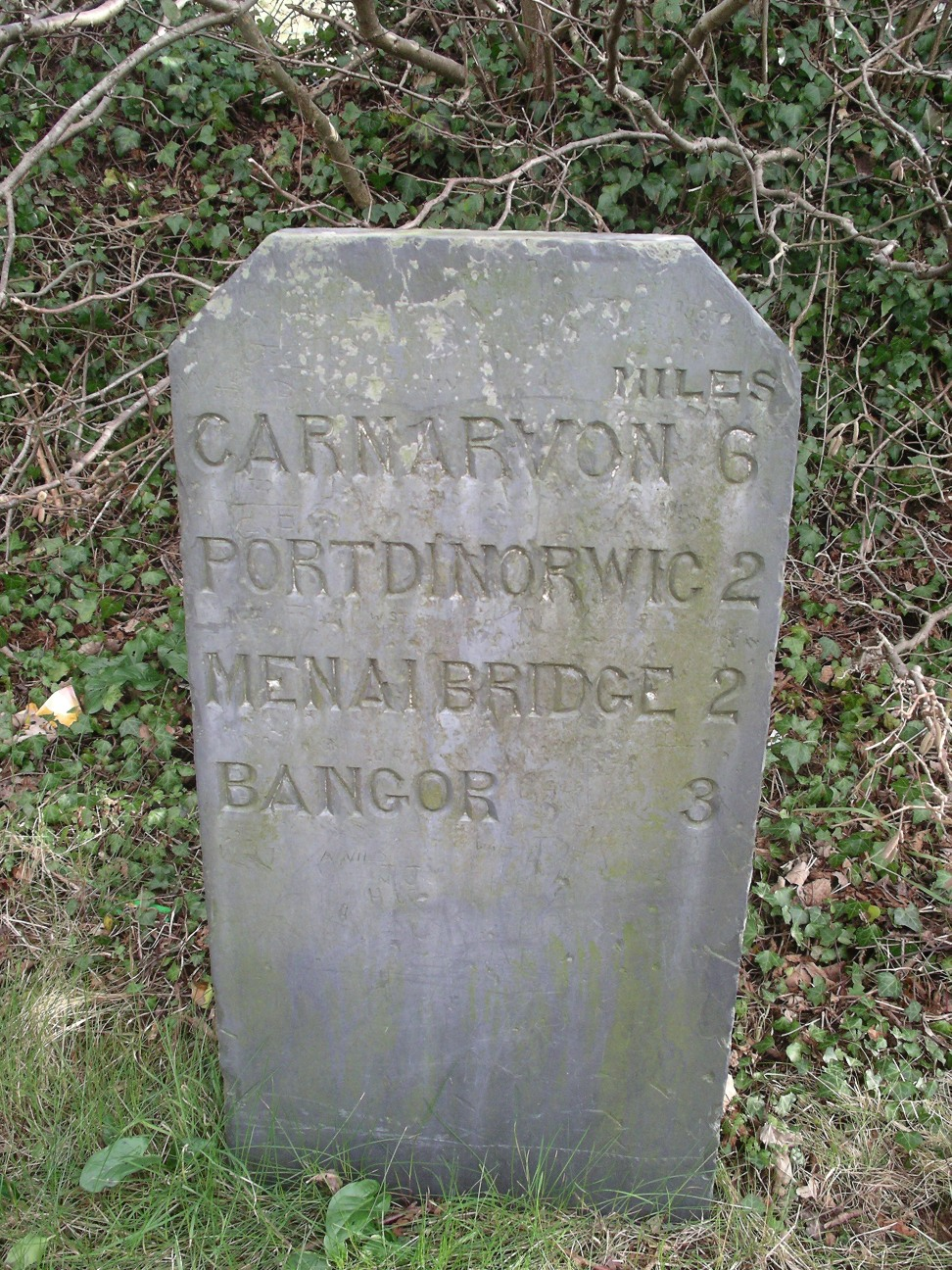
Slate milestone near Bangor, Wales

A milestone is a numbered marker placed on a route such as a road, railway line, canal or boundary. They can indicate the distance to towns, cities, and other places or landmarks like mileage signs; or they can give their position on the route relative to some datum location (a zero milepost). On roads they are typically located at the side or in a median or central reservation. They are alternatively known as mile markers (sometimes abbreviated MMs), mileposts or mile posts (sometimes abbreviated MPs). A "kilometric point" is a term used in metricated areas, where distances are commonly measured in kilometres instead of miles. "Distance marker" is a generic unit-agnostic term.

Milestones are installed to provide linear referencing points along the road. This can be used to reassure travellers that the proper path is being followed, and to indicate either distance travelled or the remaining distance to a destination. Such references are also used by maintenance engineers and emergency services to direct them to specific points where their presence is required. This term is sometimes used to denote a location on a road even if no physical sign is present. This is useful for accident reporting and other record keeping (e.g., "an accident occurred at the 13-mile mark" even if the road is only marked with a stone once every 10 miles). Distance markers are typically written only to integer values (sometimes with a single significant figures), often with the unit name or symbol before the number, as in "mile x" or "kilometre y", for example, "mile 317" or "kilometre 510". (Note: This is in contrast to the standard practice in technical and scientific fields, of having the unit symbol appearing after the numerical value, as in 317 mi or 510 km.)

== History ==
=== Roman Empire ===
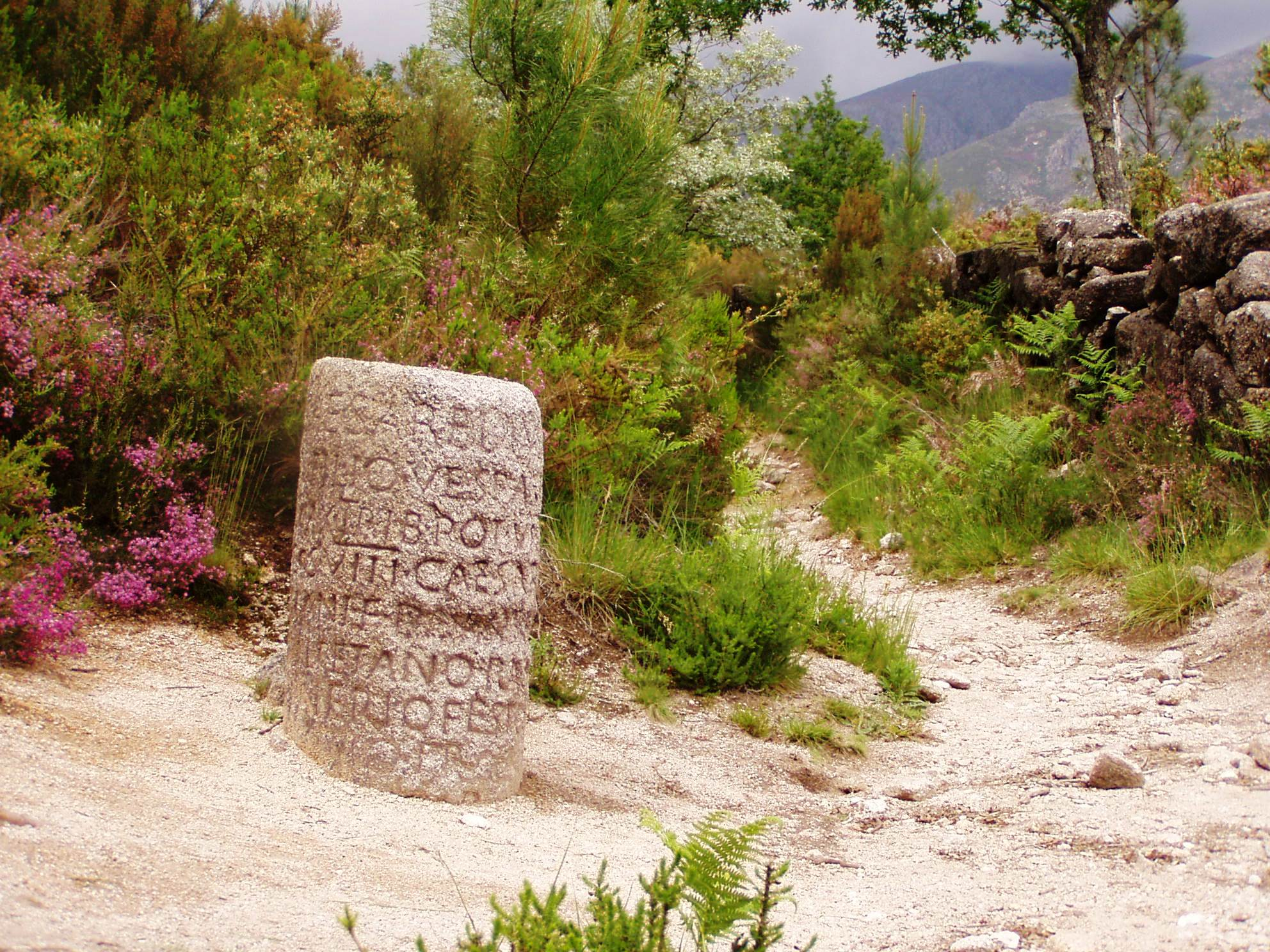
Roman milestone XXIX on Via Romana XVIII – the road linking the Iberian cities of Bracara Augusta and Asturica Augusta

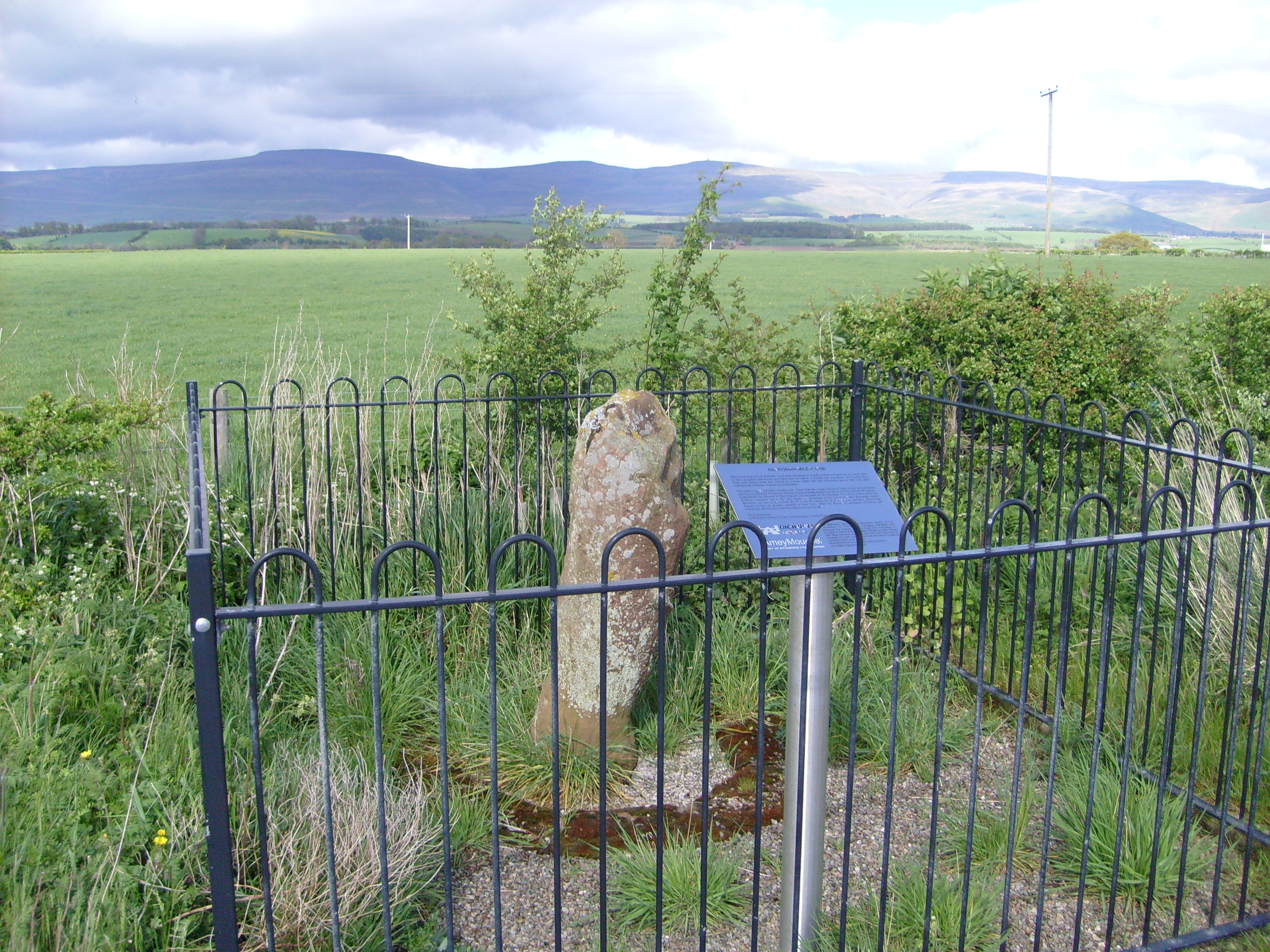
Roman milestone on the former A66 between Kirkby Thore and Temple Sowerby (no inscription)

Miliarium (Classical Latin: [miːllɪˈaːrɪ.ũː ˈau̯rɛ.ũː]) were originally stone obelisks – made from granite, marble, or whatever local stone was available – and later concrete posts. They were widely used by Roman Empire road builders and were an important part of any Roman road network: the distance travelled per day was only a few miles in some cases. Many Roman milestones only record the name of the reigning emperor without giving any placenames or distances. The first Roman milestones appeared on the Appian Way. At the centre of Rome, the "Golden Milestone" was erected to mark the presumed centre of the empire: this milestone has since been lost. The Golden Milestone inspired the Zero Milestone in Washington, D.C., intended as the point from which all road distances in the United States should be reckoned. Odometers were used to measure the Roman milestone spacing, most likely based on Ancient Greek technology.

=== Byzantine Empire ===
A mile-marker monument, the Milion, was erected in the early 4th century AD in Constantinople. It served as the starting point for measurement of distances for all the roads leading to the cities of the Byzantine Empire, and had the same function as the Milliarium Aureum of Ancient Rome. The Milion survived intact until at least the late 15th century. Its fragments were discovered again in the late 1960s. A fragment is re-erected as a pillar.

=== Islamic civilization ===
In Islamic civilisation, use of milestone began in the first Islamic century. The Umayyad caliph Abd al-Malik bin Marwan laid the milestones along the paths that travelers used, and some were found in the city of Faiq in the Syrian Golan, which is, Faiq, one of the main road stations throughout the Islamic ages. The function of these stones was to guide travelers and introduce them to long distances, as the separation between one and the other was one mile. Many of these stones were found in more than one location, one in the Islamic Archeology Museum in Istanbul and another in the Jerusalem Museum. A translation of the text written on the stone currently found in the Kasserine Museum in the Golan reads as follows:

In the name of God, the Most Gracious, the Most Merciful.

There is no god but God alone, and there is no partner for it. Muhammad is the Messenger of God. He ordered the making of these miles, Abdul Malik bin Marwan, Commander of the Faithful. At the hands of a consultant, the Lord of the Faithful.

In Sha'ban from the year eighty-five, from Damascus to this stone fifty-three miles.

=== Post-Medieval Europe ===
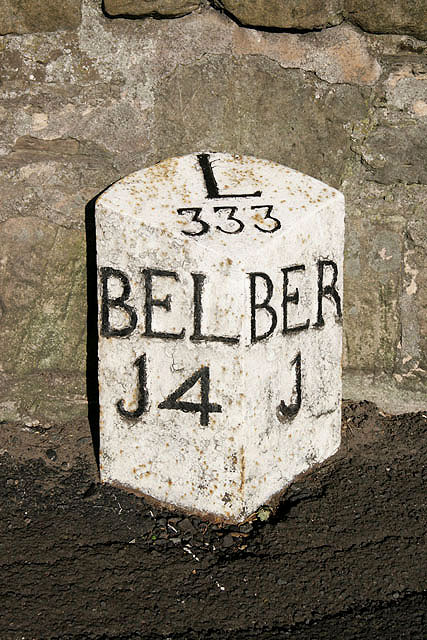
Milestone in Northumberland, indicating 1 mile to Berwick-upon-Tweed, 14 miles to Belford and 333 miles to London

In Europe, the distance measured typically starts at specified point within a city or town, as many roads were named for the towns at either end. For example, in London, United Kingdom, a plaque near the Eleanor cross at Charing Cross is the reference point from which distances from London to other towns and cities are measured. In the UK, milestones are especially associated with former turnpike roads.

The British built many milestones on the island of Malta. They consisted of large slabs of local hard rock and they were engraved with the distance to or from a particular location. Many of these were defaced in World War II to disorientate forces in a potential invasion. Despite this, a very small number of milestones still exist undefaced, and one of these is now in the Malta at War Museum.

=== India ===
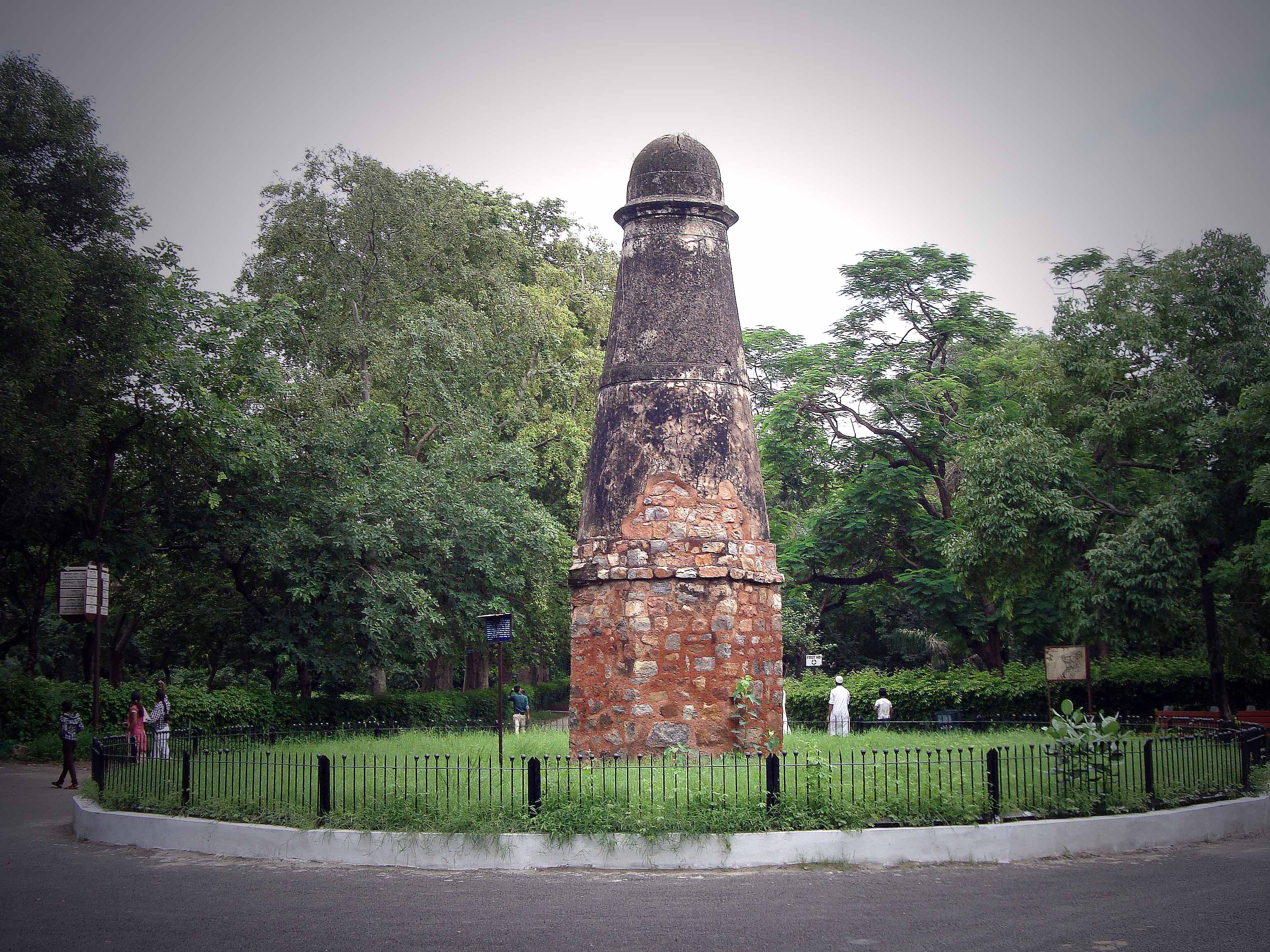
Kos Minar (Mughal Milestone), Delhi Zoo, New Delhi, India

The Kos Minars or Mile Pillars are medieval milestones that were made by the 16th-century Afghan Ruler Sher Shah Suri and later on by Mughal emperors. These Minars were erected by the Mughal Emperors on the main highways across the empire to mark the distance. The Kos Minar is a solid round pillar, around 30 feet (9.1 m) in height that stands on a masonry platform built with bricks and plastered over with lime. Though not architecturally very impressive, being milestones, they were an important part of communication and travel in a large empire.

Kos is an ancient Indian unit of distance. It can represent either a distance of approximately 1.8 kilometres (1.1 mi) or 3.2 kilometres (2.0 mi). Minar is a Persian word for tower. Abul Fazl recorded in Akbar Nama that in the year 1575 AD, Akbar issued an order that at every Kos on the way from Agra to Ajmer, a pillar or a minar should be erected for the comfort of the travelers.

== Modern highways ==
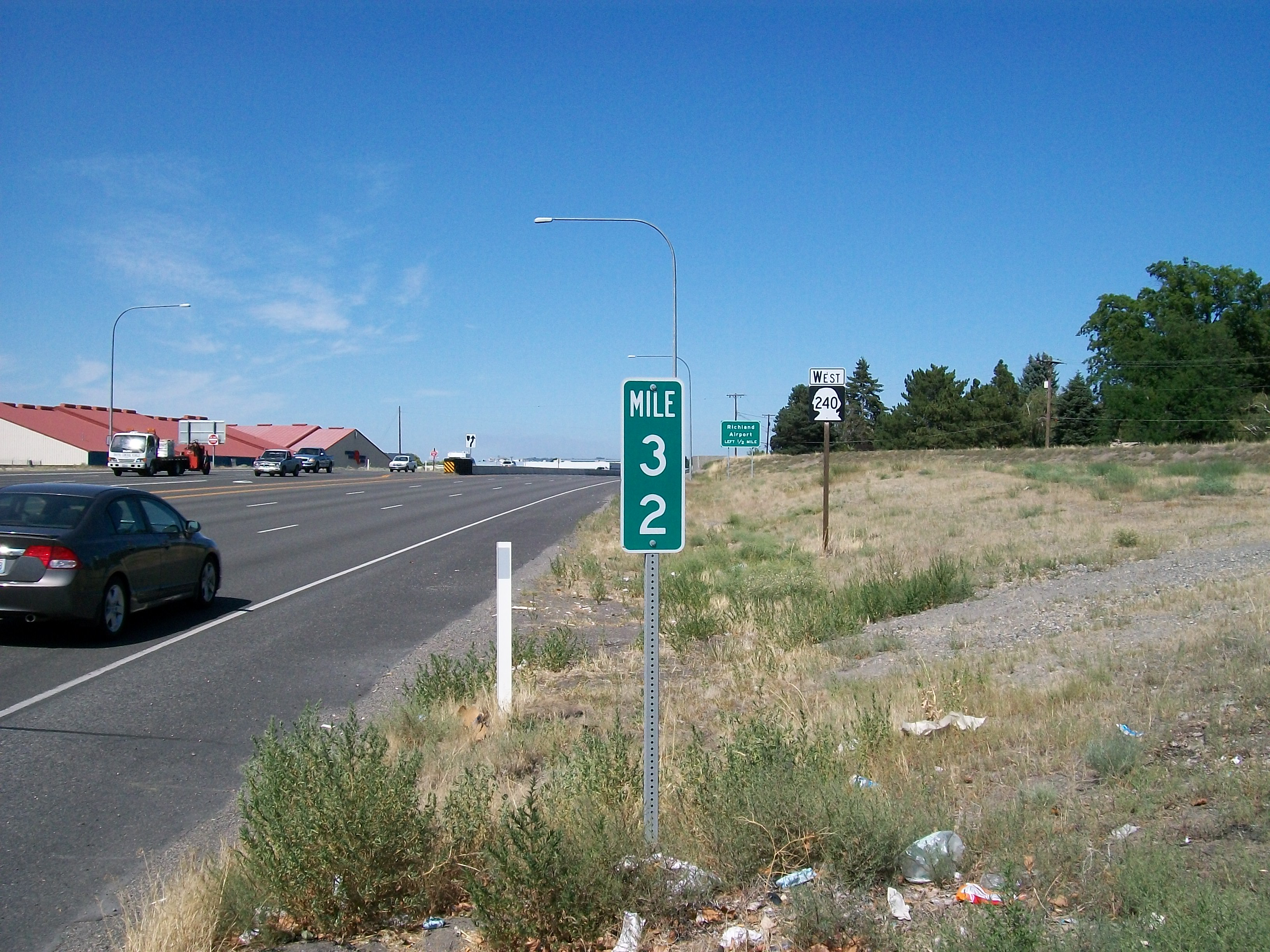
Typical mile marker used in the United States

The historical term milestone is still used today, even though the "stones" are typically metal highway location markers and in most countries use kilometres and metres rather than miles and yards. Also found today are more closely spaced signs containing fractional numbers, and signs along railways, beaches and canals.

== Railway mileposts ==
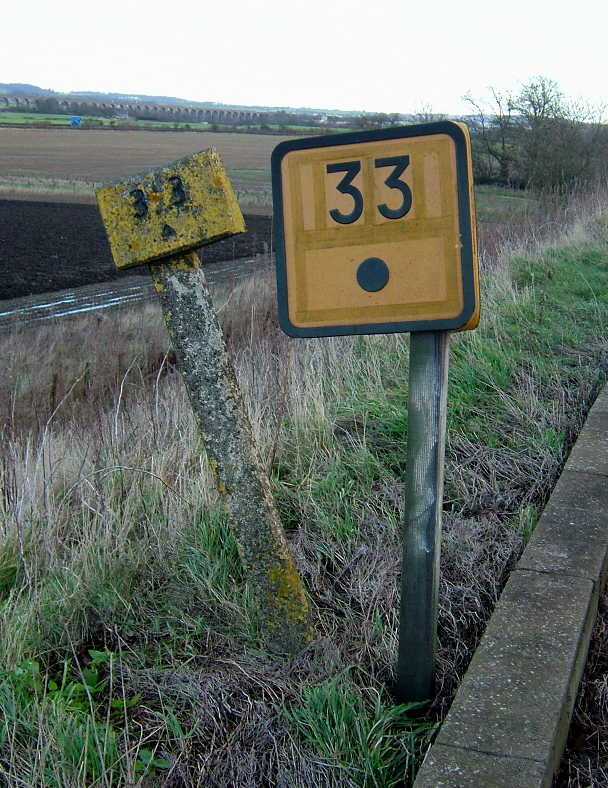
Old and new railway mileposts in the UK, indicating a distance of 33 1/4 miles (53.5 km) from the zero point

The Railways Clauses Consolidation Act 1845 compels UK railway companies to provide their passengers with a means of determining the distance travelled (fares were set by distance at this time). Section 94 states:

"The company shall cause the length of the railway to be measured, and milestones, posts, or other conspicuous objects to be set up and maintained along the whole line thereof, at the distance of one quarter of a mile from each other, with numbers or marks inscribed thereon denoting such distances."

Similar laws were passed in other countries. On the modern railway, these historical markers are still used as infrastructure reference points. At many points, the distances shown on the markers are based upon points no longer on the network – for example, distances measured via a closed line or from a junction which has subsequently been moved. Whole mileposts are usually supplemented by half and quarter posts. Structure signs often include the mileage to a fair degree of precision; in the UK, the chain (equal to 1/80 mile or 20 metres) is the usual accuracy. In the U.S. and Canada, miles are "decimalized", so that, for example, there may be a "milepost 4.83" to mark a junction, crossing, bridge or tunnel.

In metricated areas, the equivalent is the kilometric point.

== Boundaries ==
Surveyors place milestones to mark the boundaries between the jurisdictions separated by borders. A series of such boundary markers exists at one mile (1.6 km) intervals along the borders of the District of Columbia in the United States.

== Gallery ==
United Kingdom

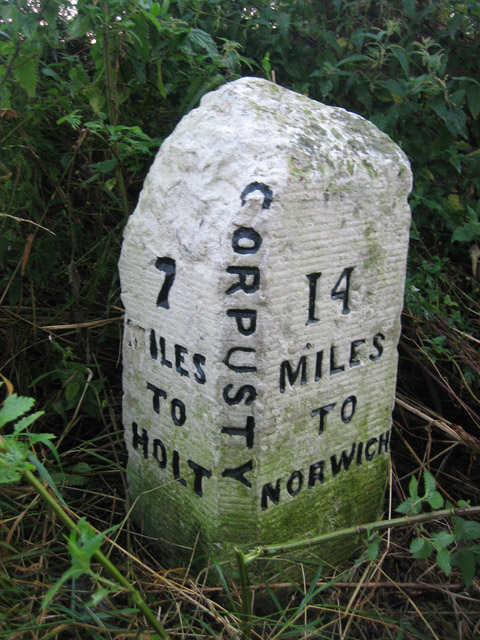
B1149 near Corpusty, Norfolk

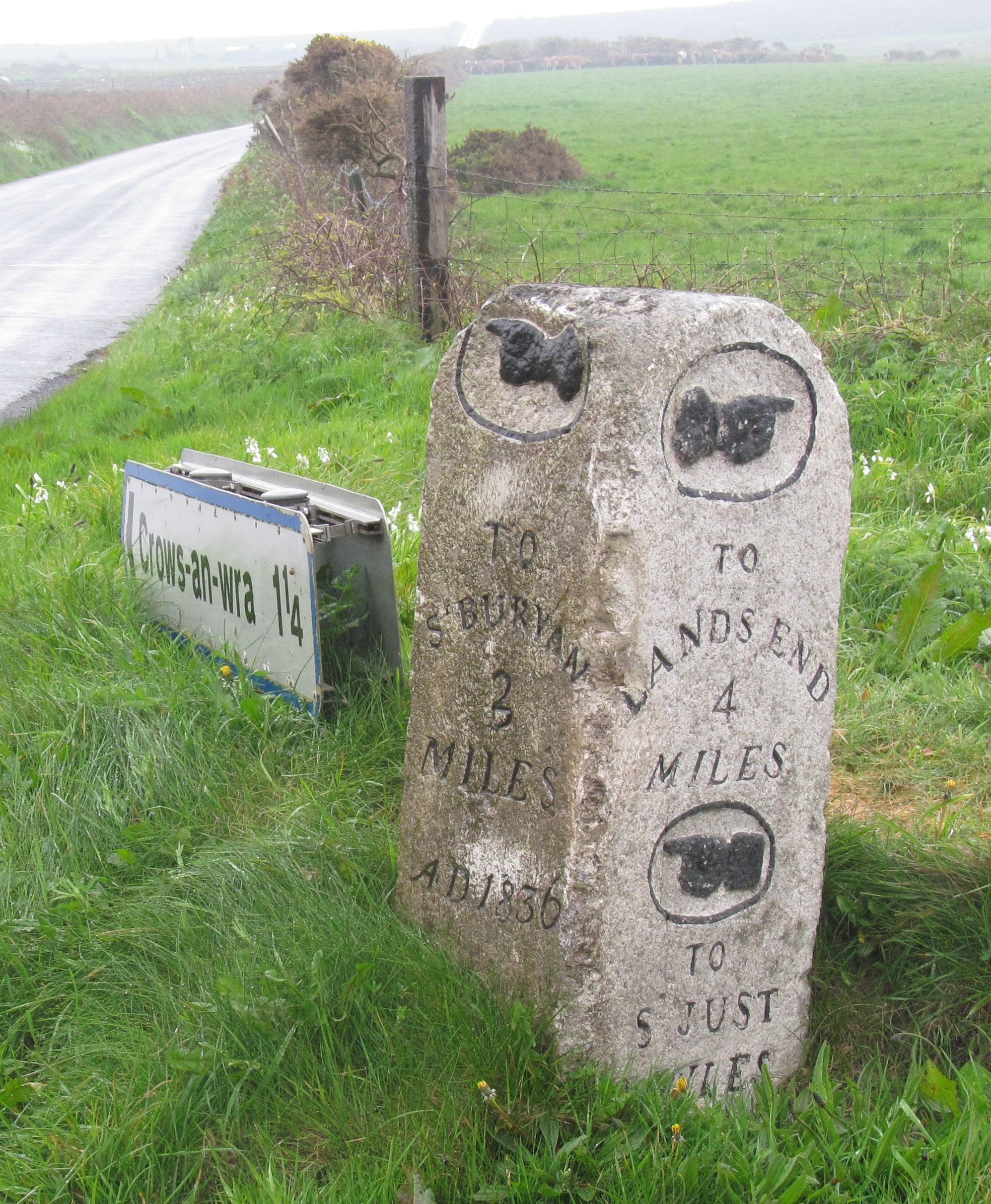
B3306 near Land's End Airport, marked "A.D. 1836"

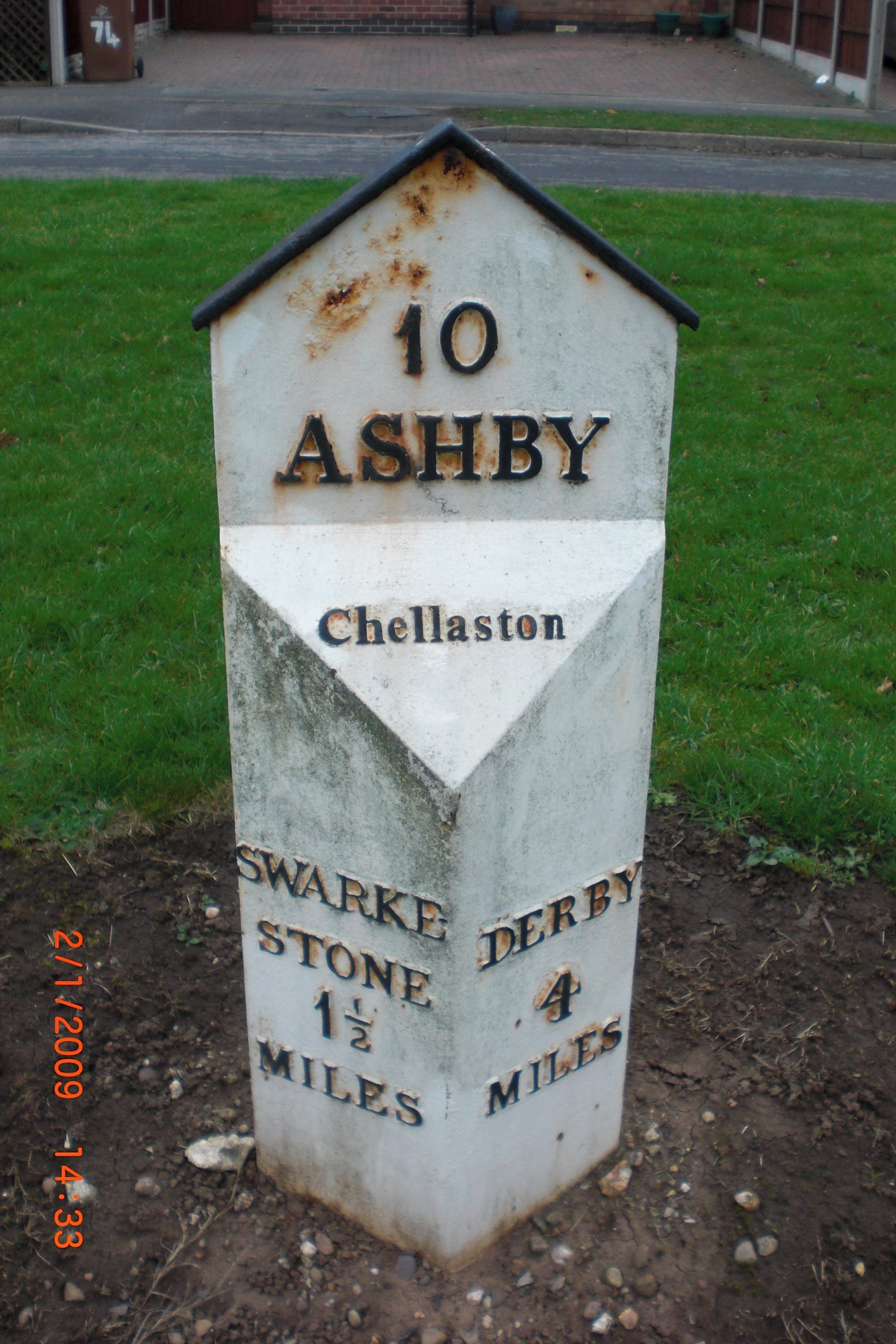
A514 in Chellaston, Derby

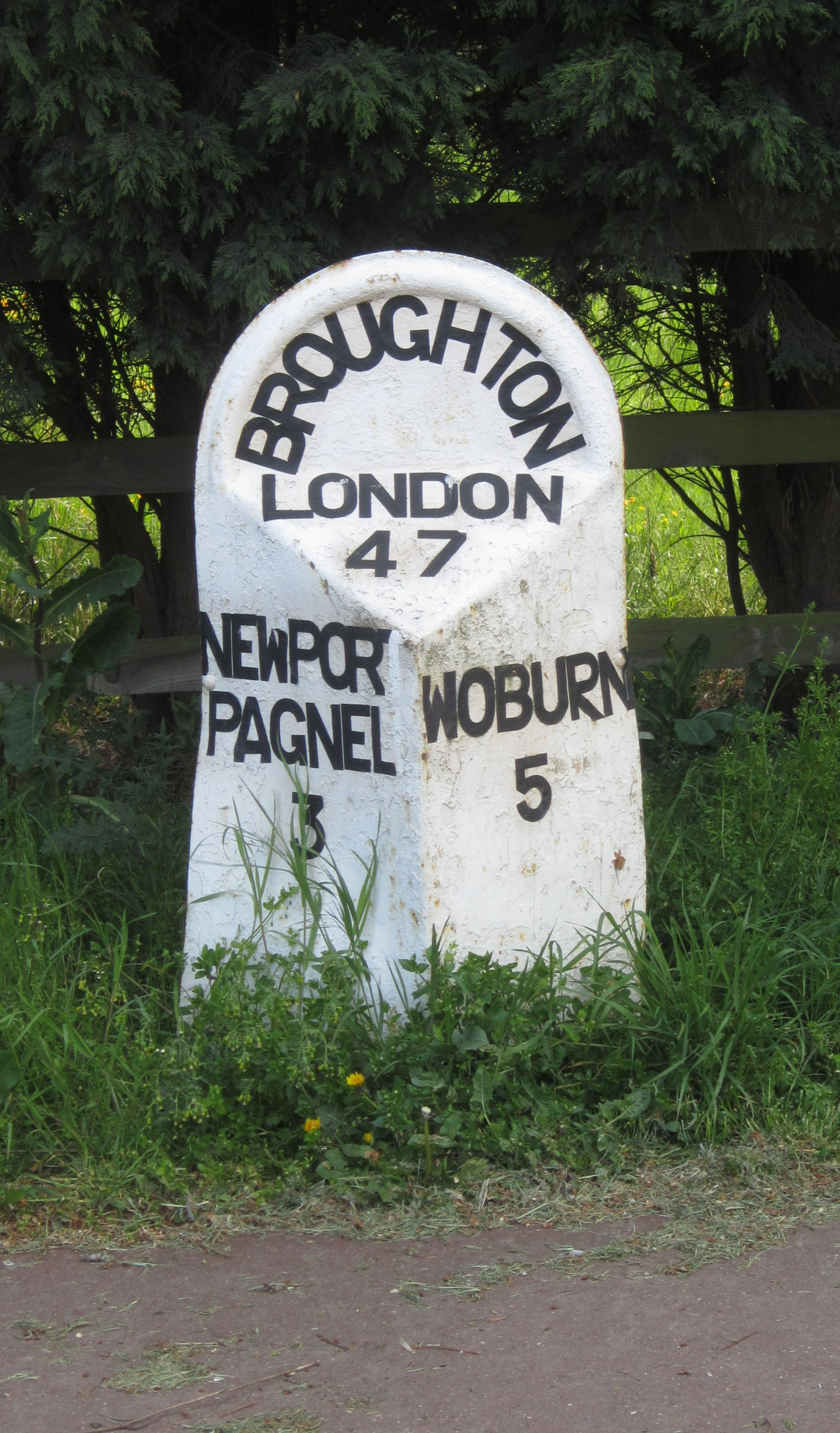
A5130 in Broughton, Milton Keynes

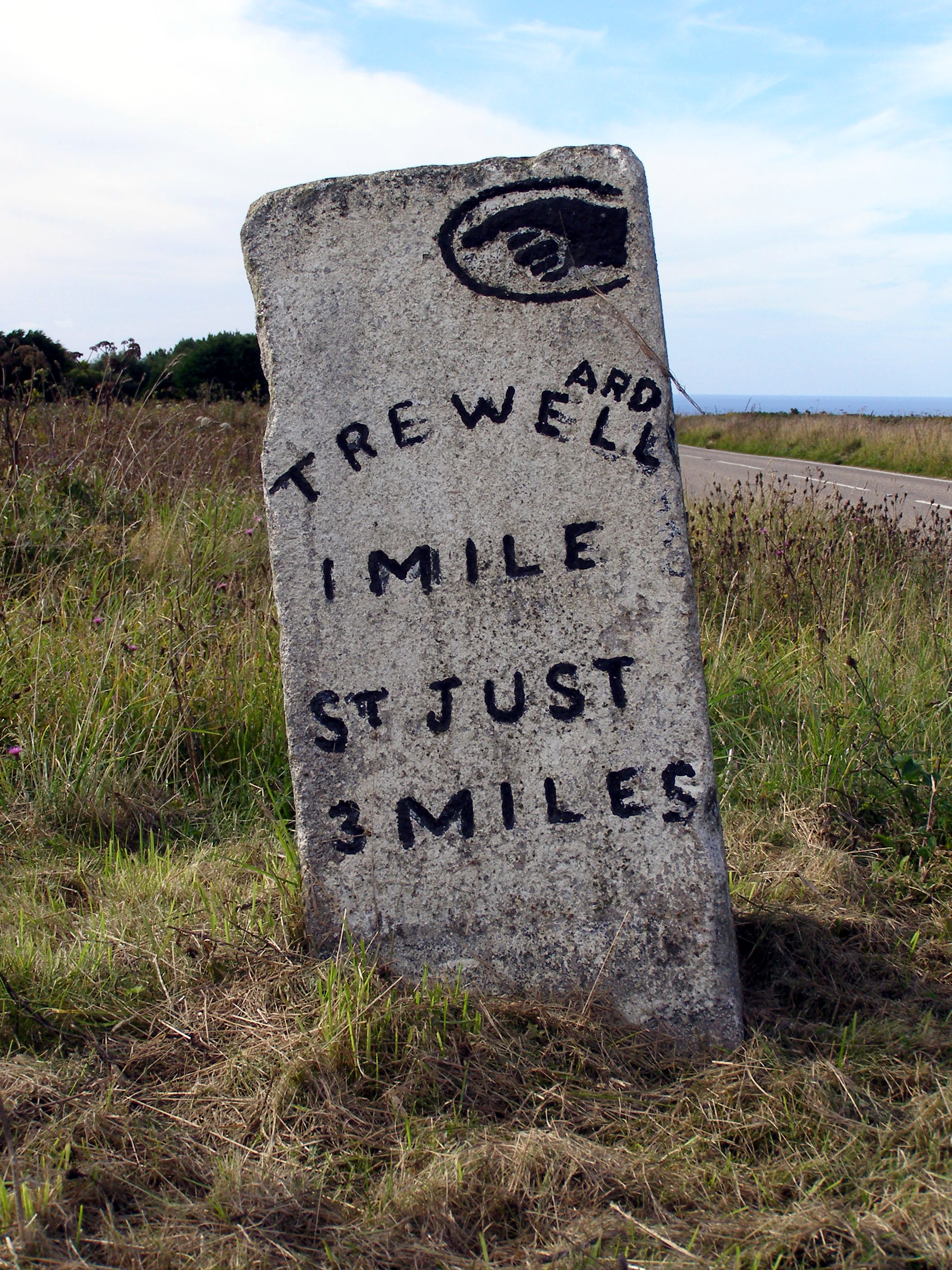
B3318 in Penwith, Cornwall

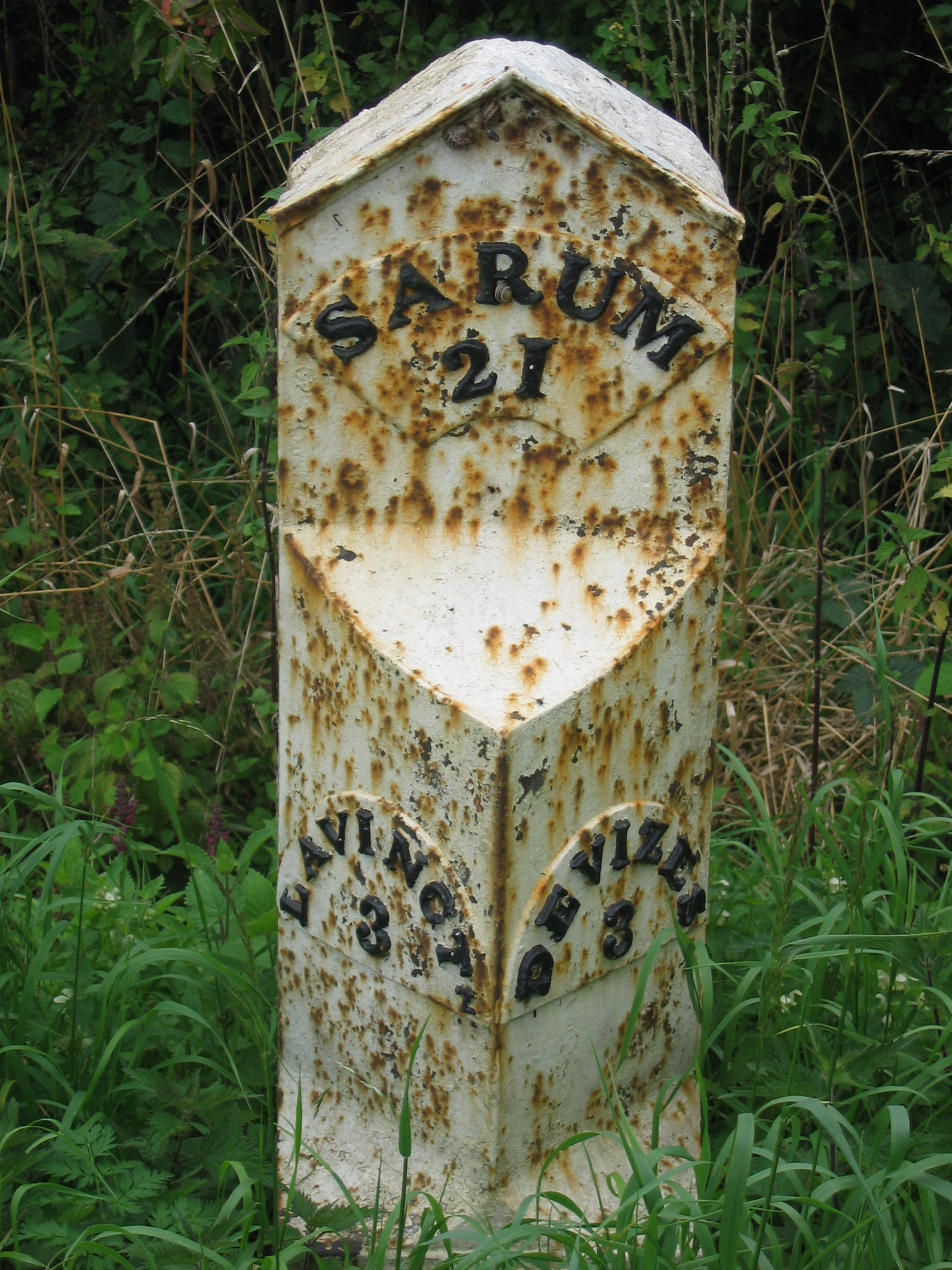
A360 near Potterne, Wiltshire

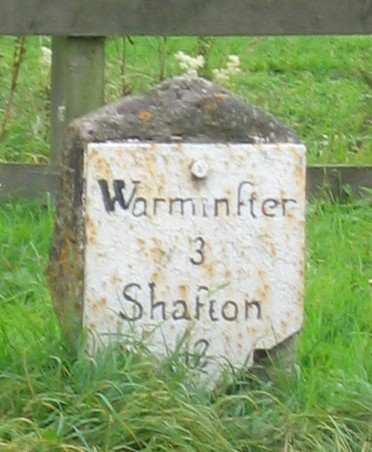
A350 in Longbridge Deverill, Wiltshire

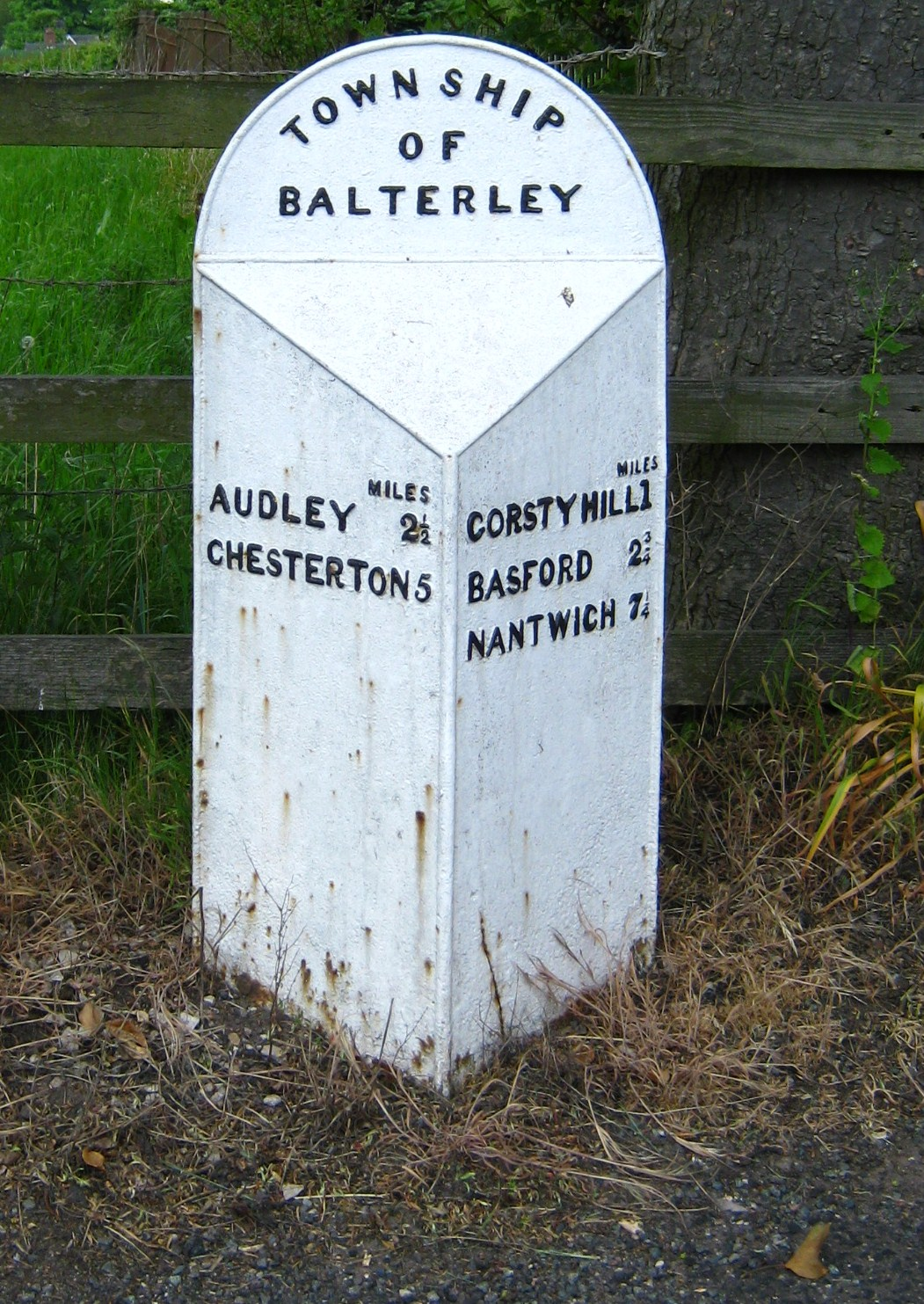
B5500 in Balterley, Staffordshire

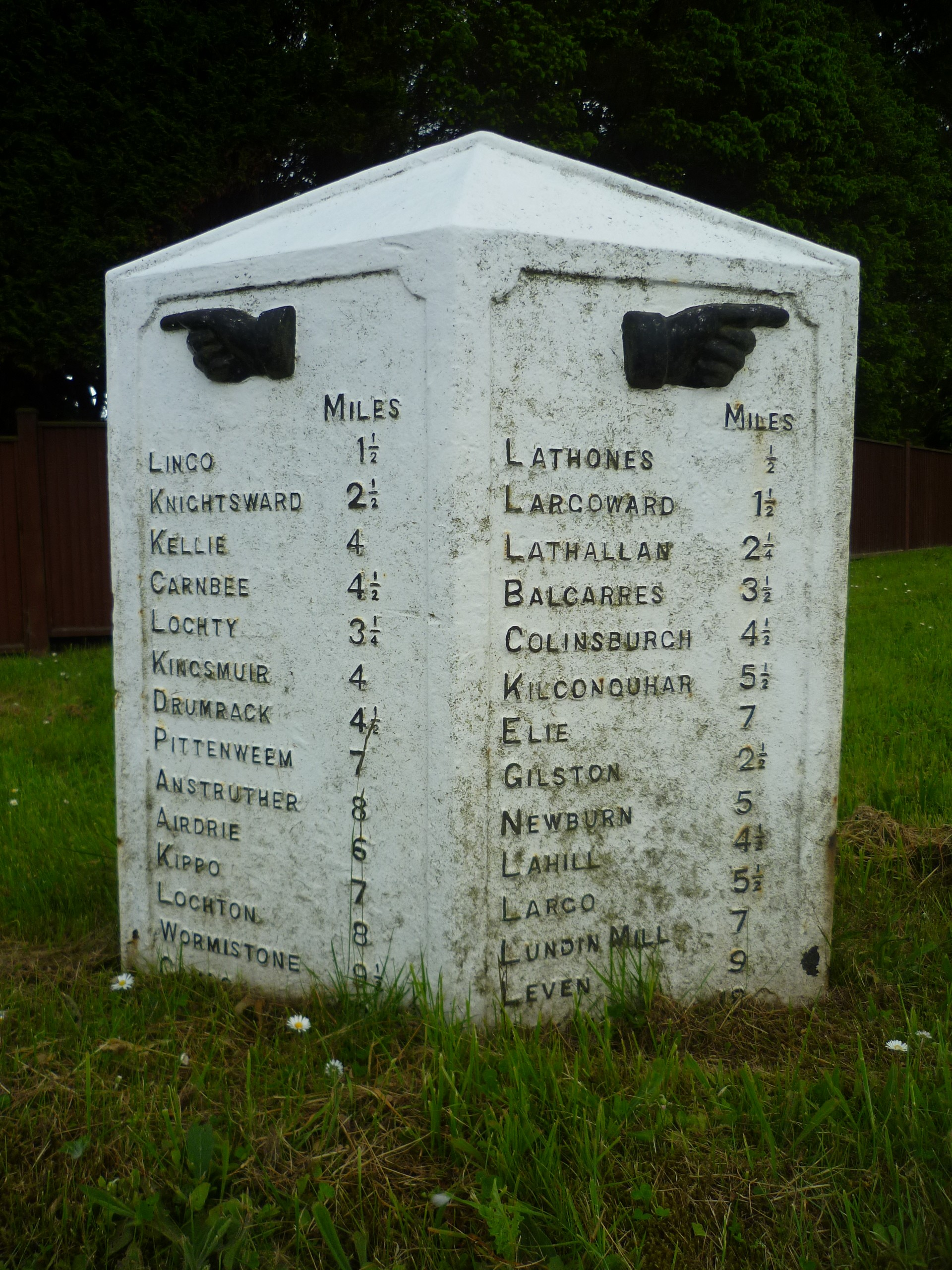
B940 near Lathones, Fife

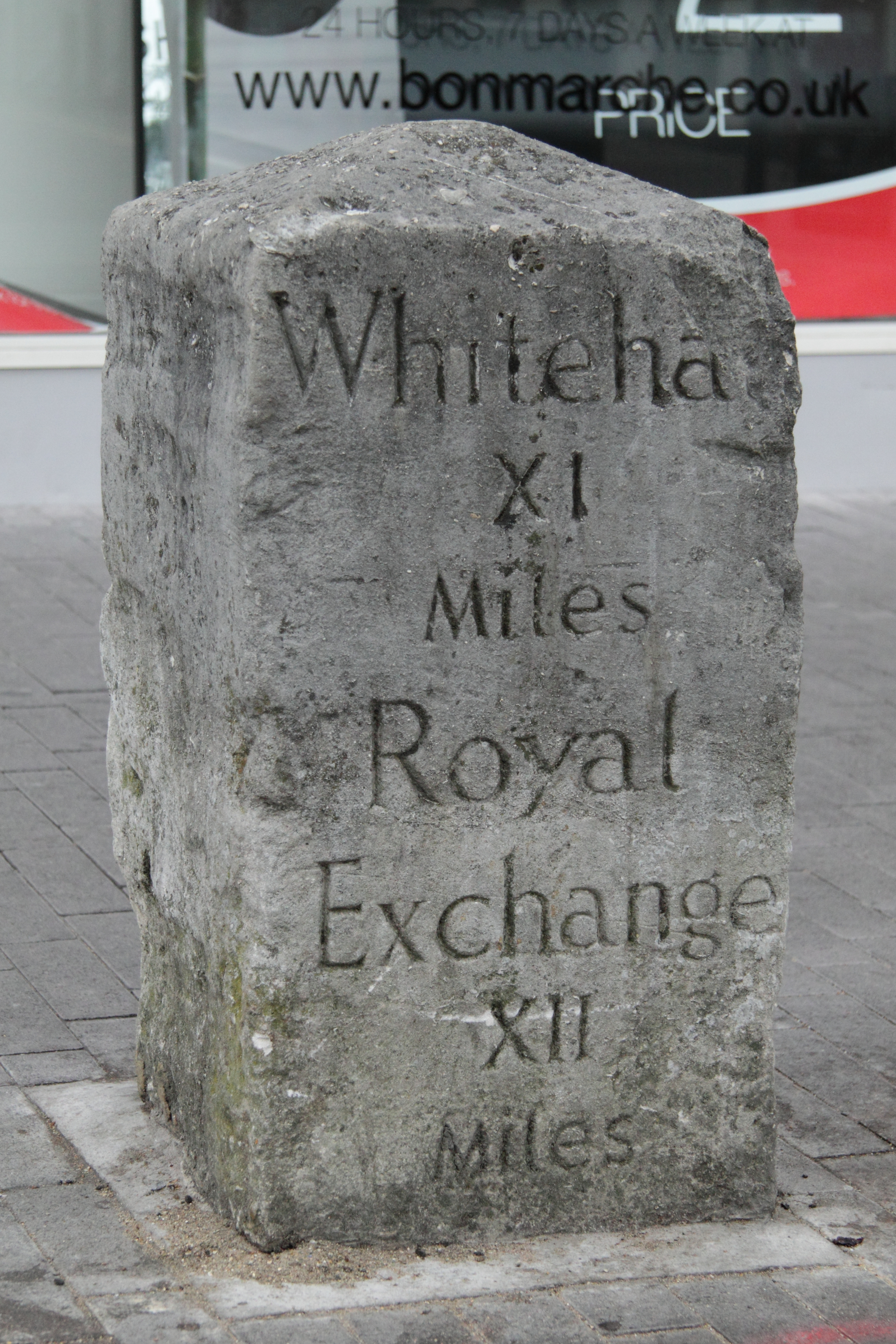
Sutton High Street, Sutton, London

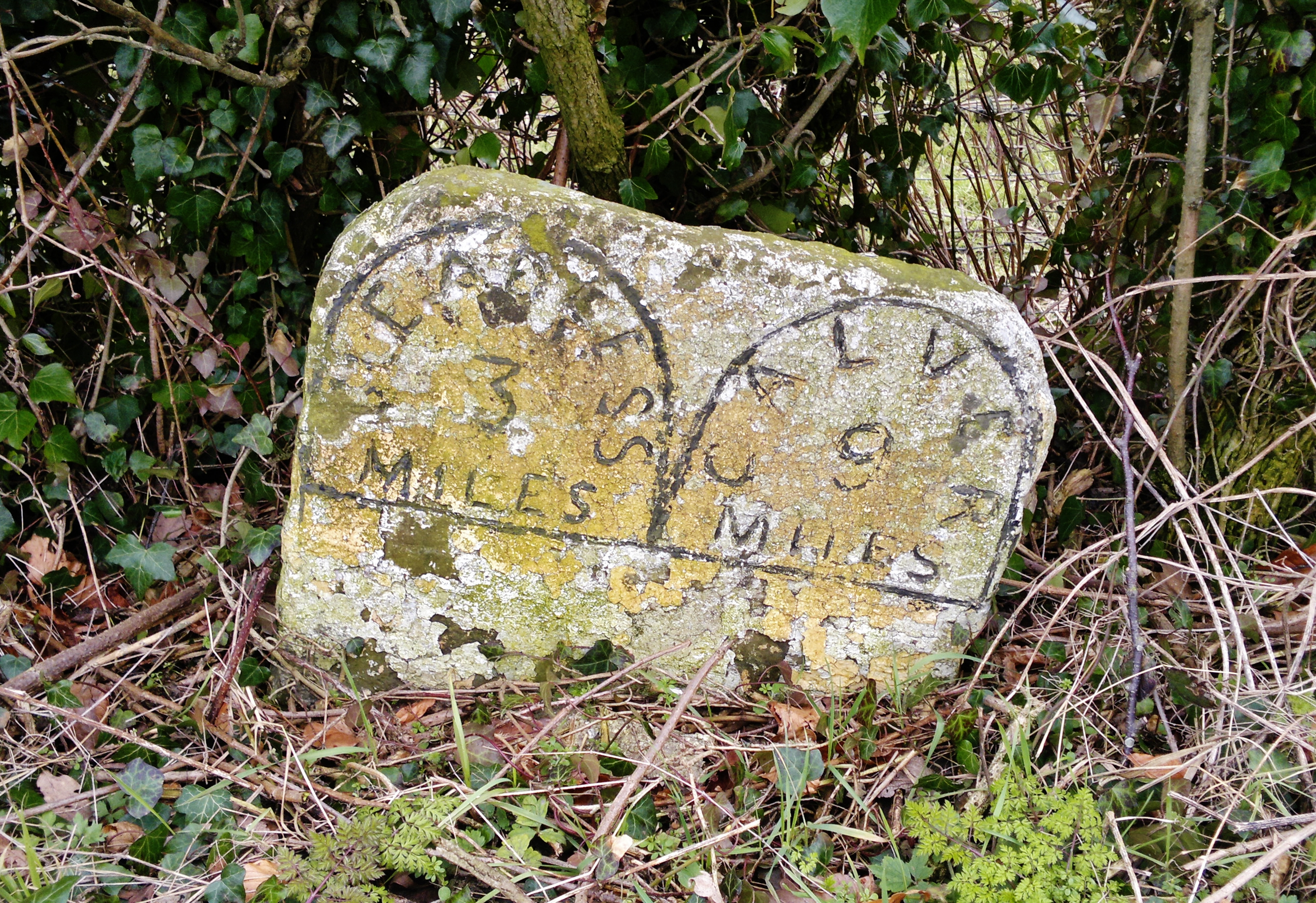
Rod Moor Road, Dronfield, Derbyshire

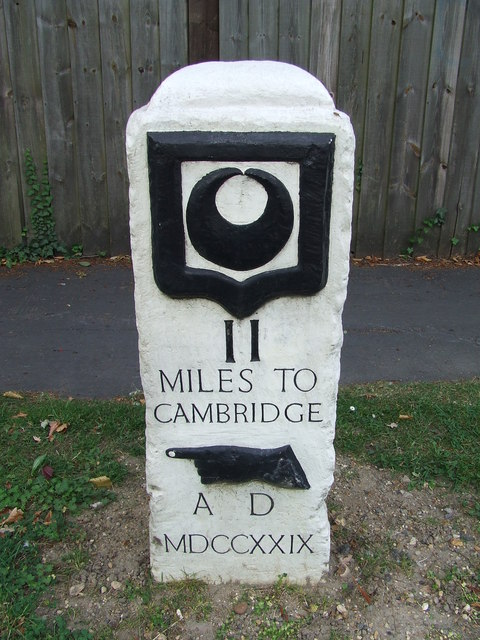
Milestone II of a set erected in 1728-1732 between Cambridge and Barkway by Dr Warren of Trinity Hall
Australia

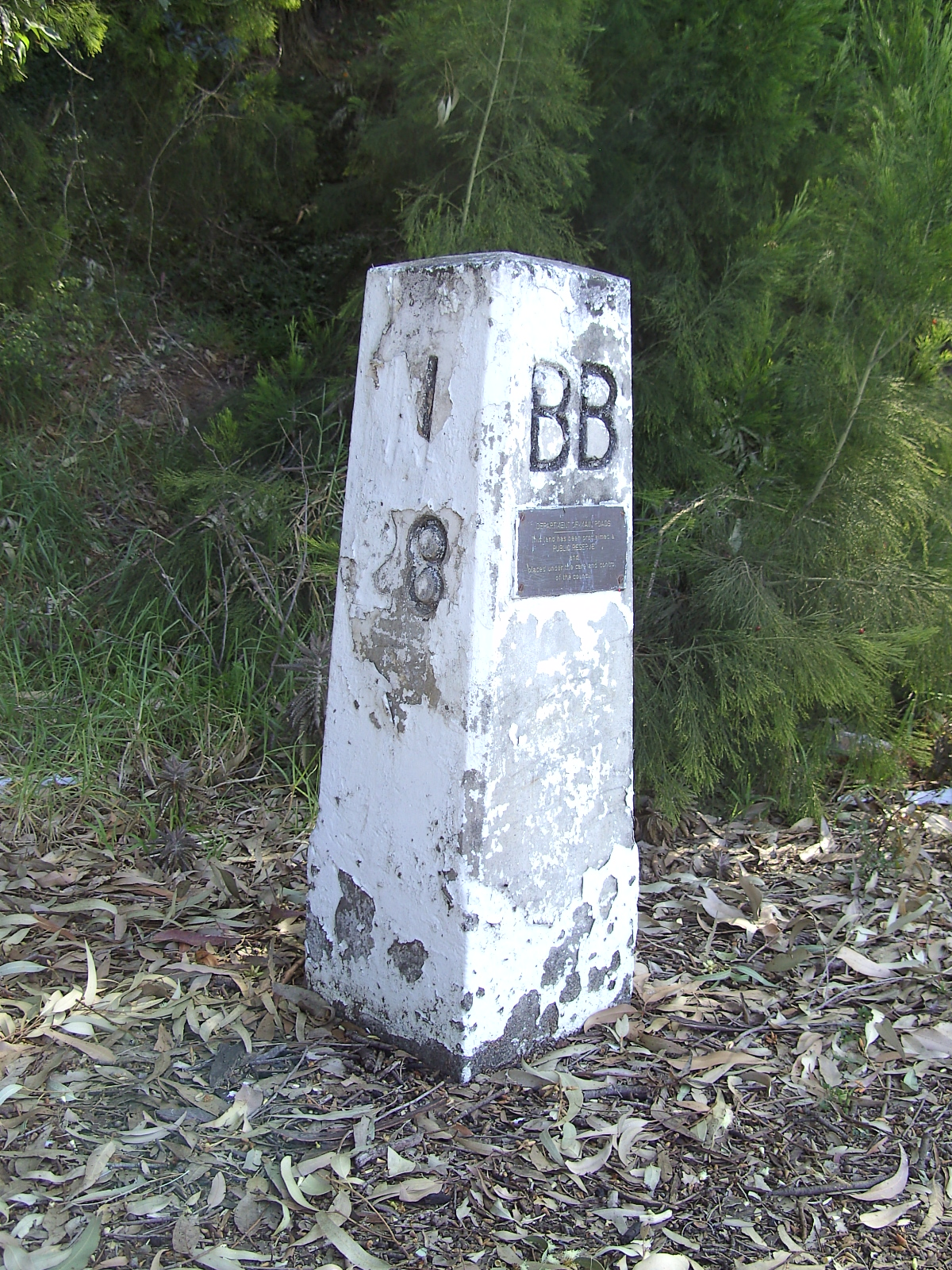
Milepost 18 from Batemans Bay, New South Wales
Denmark

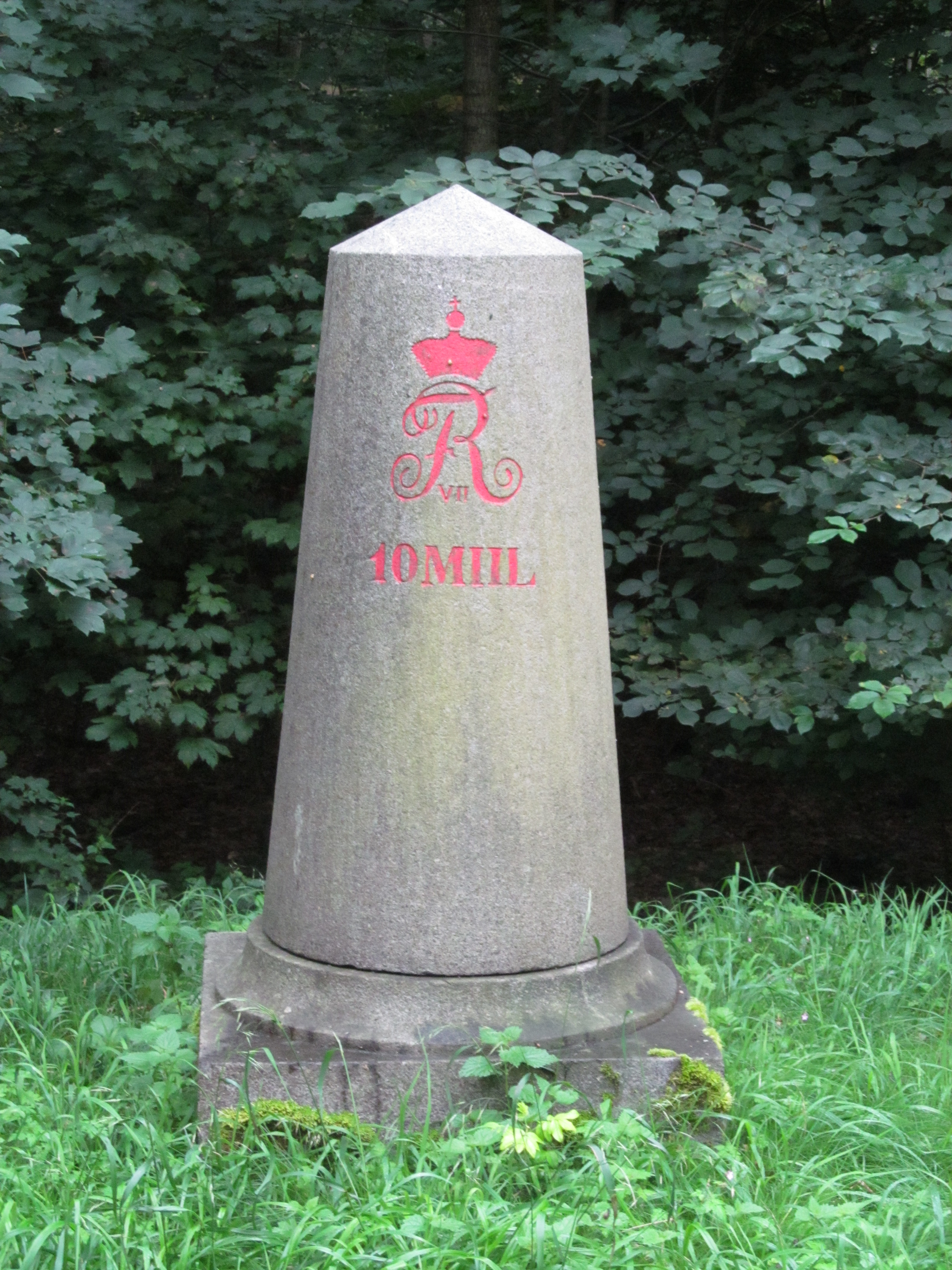
With royal cypher of Frederick VII in Skanderborg Dyrehave
Finland

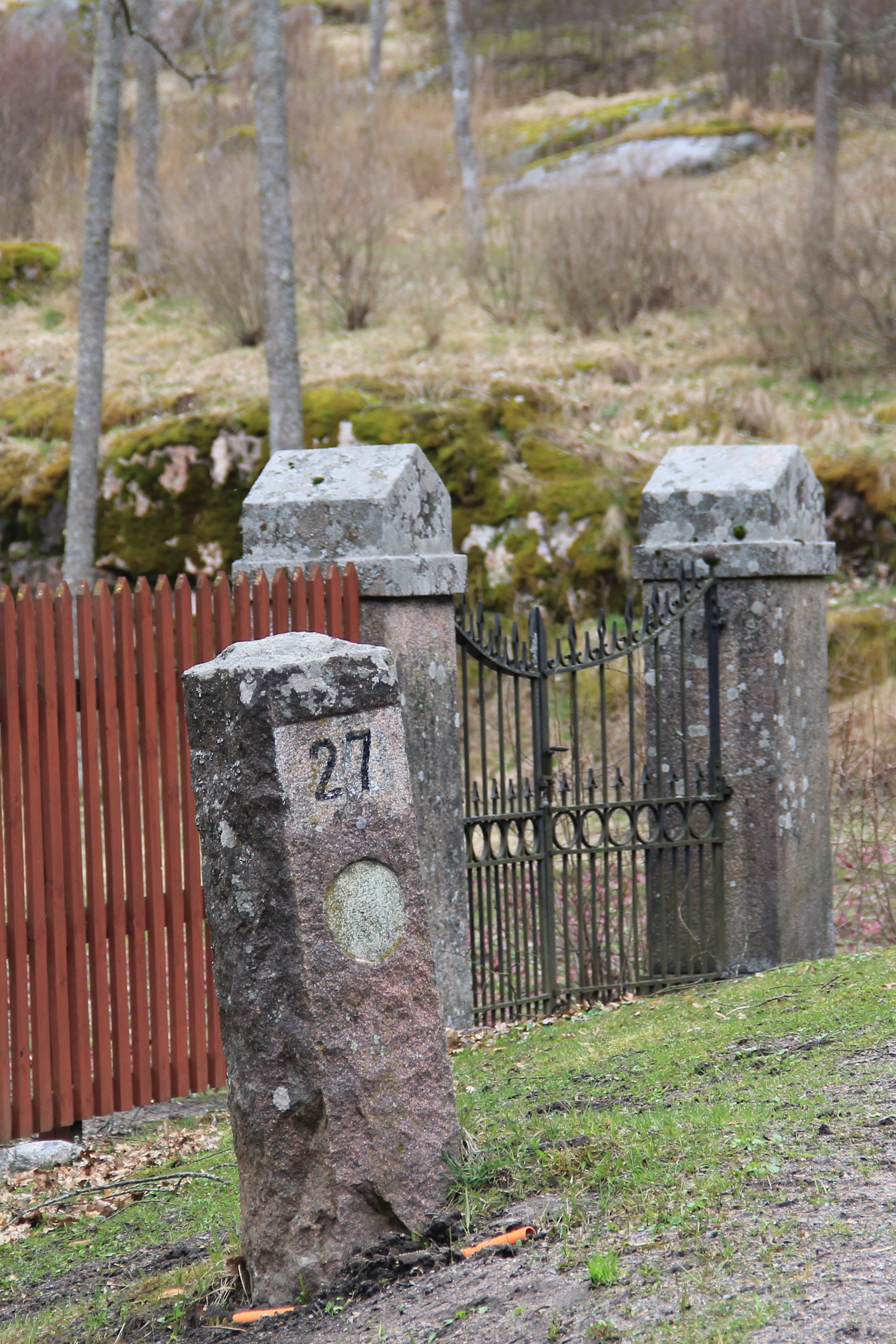
Fagervik museum road in Fagervik, Ingå

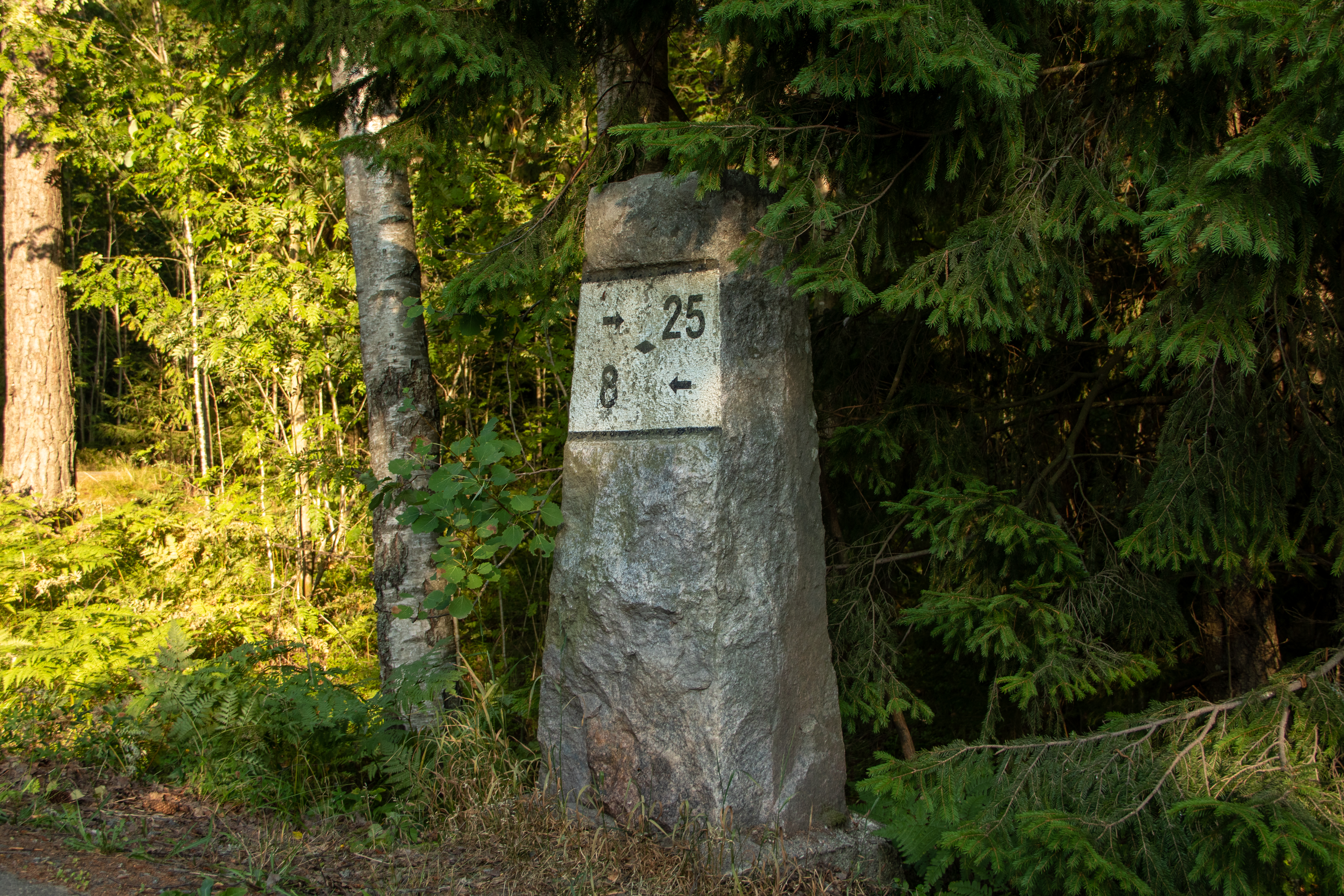
King's Road in Sipoo

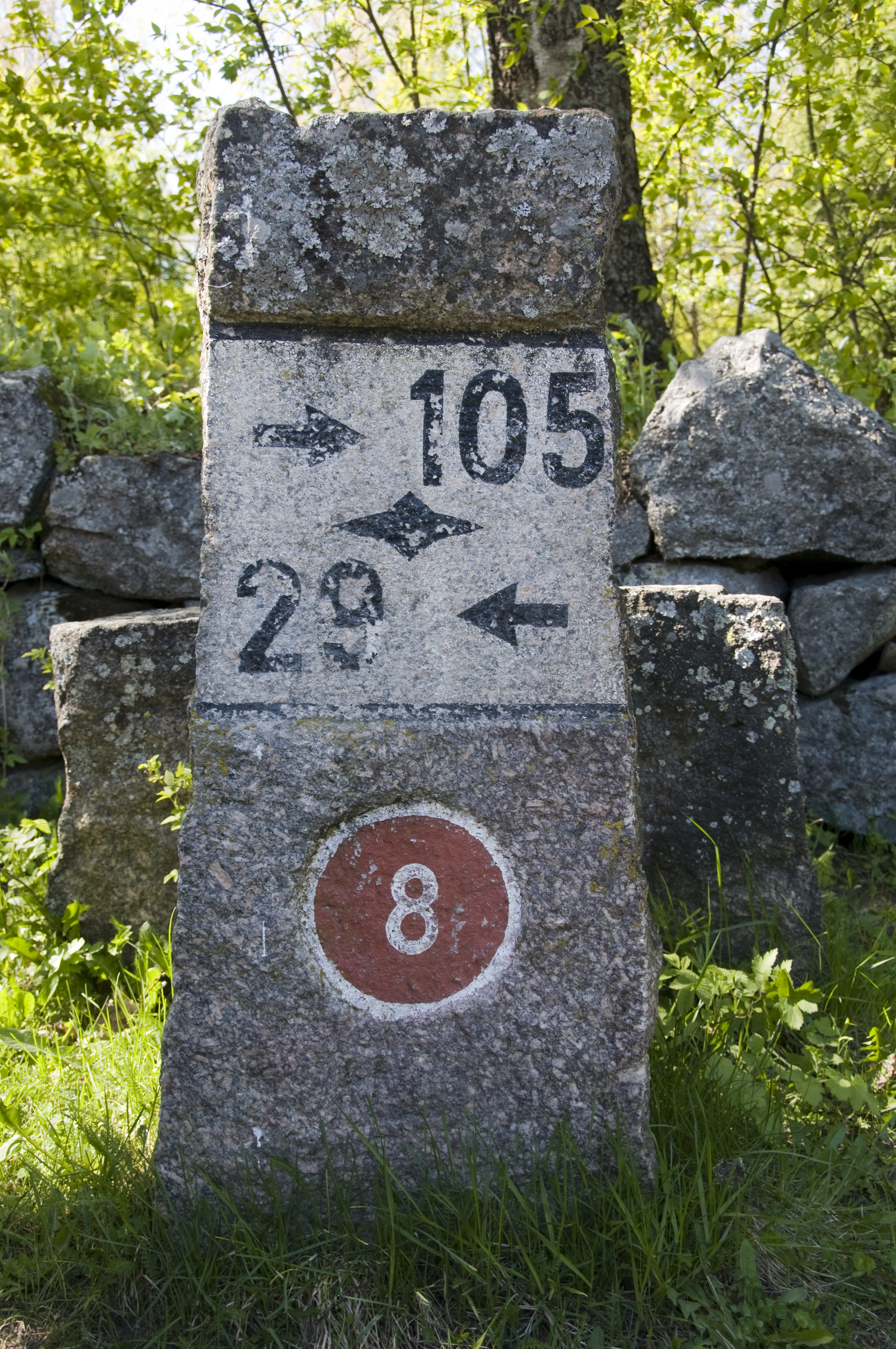
Jakobstad

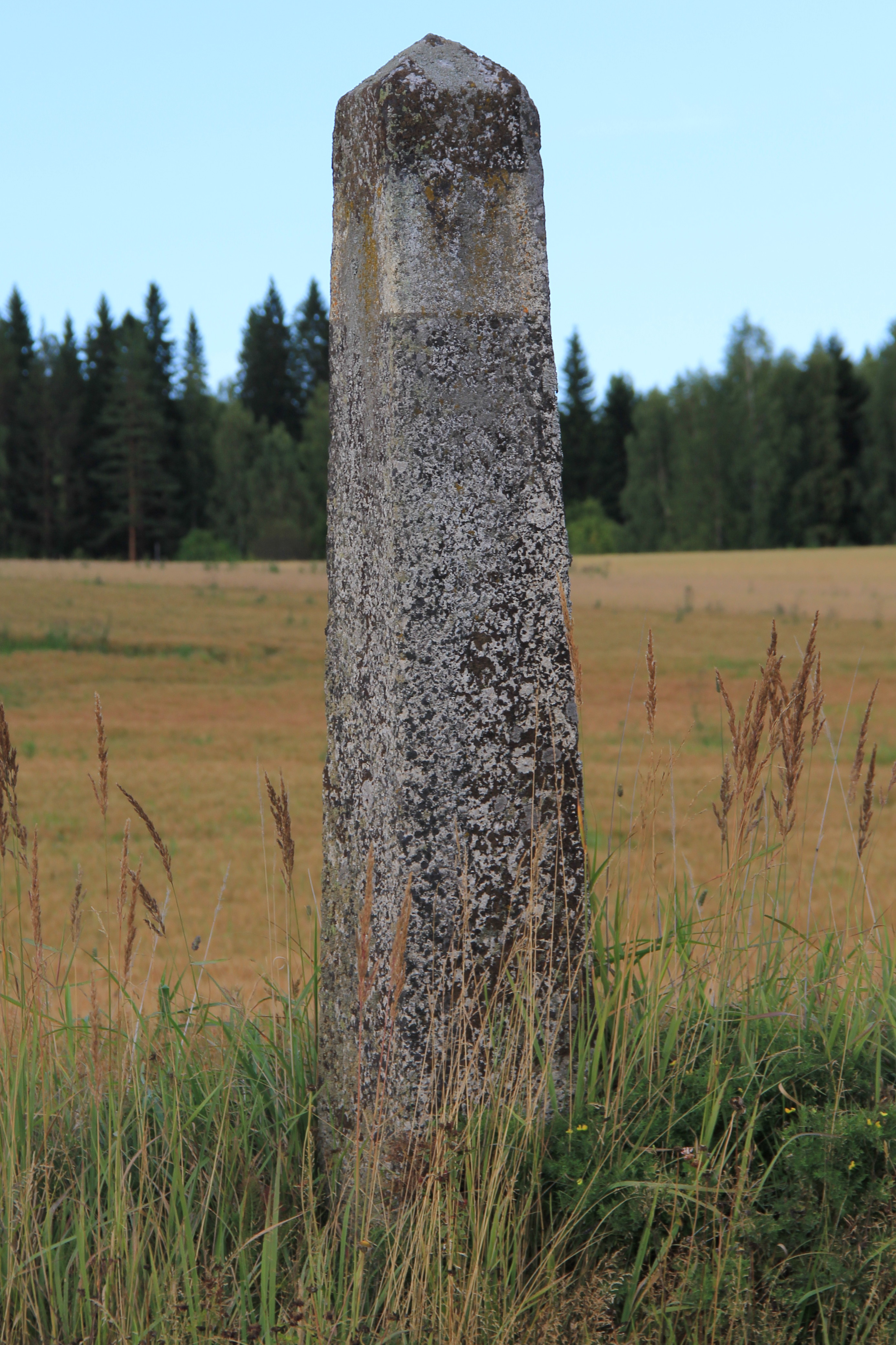
Äänekoski
India

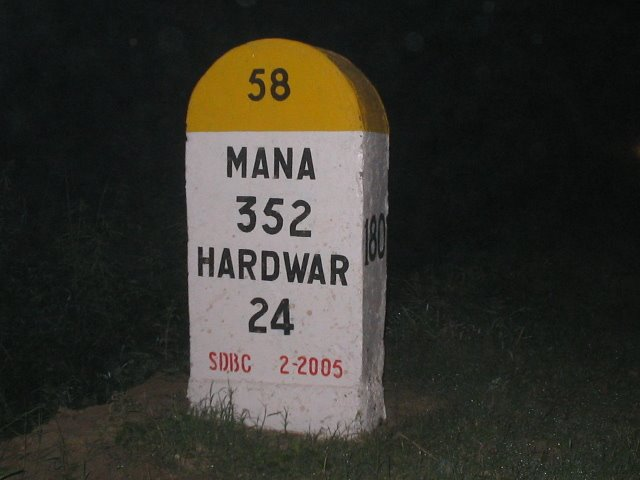
Near Haridwar

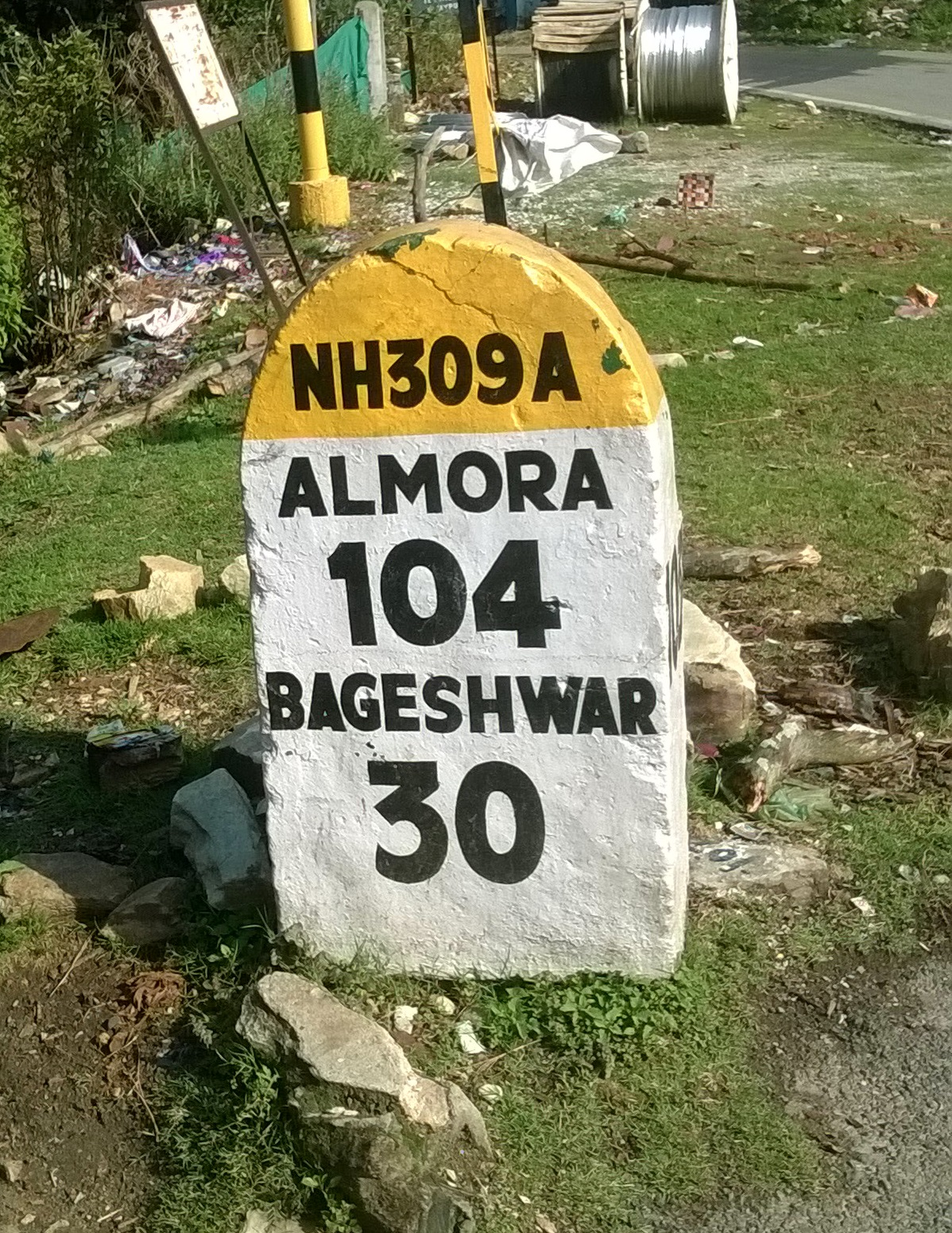
NH309A in Uttarakhand
Ireland

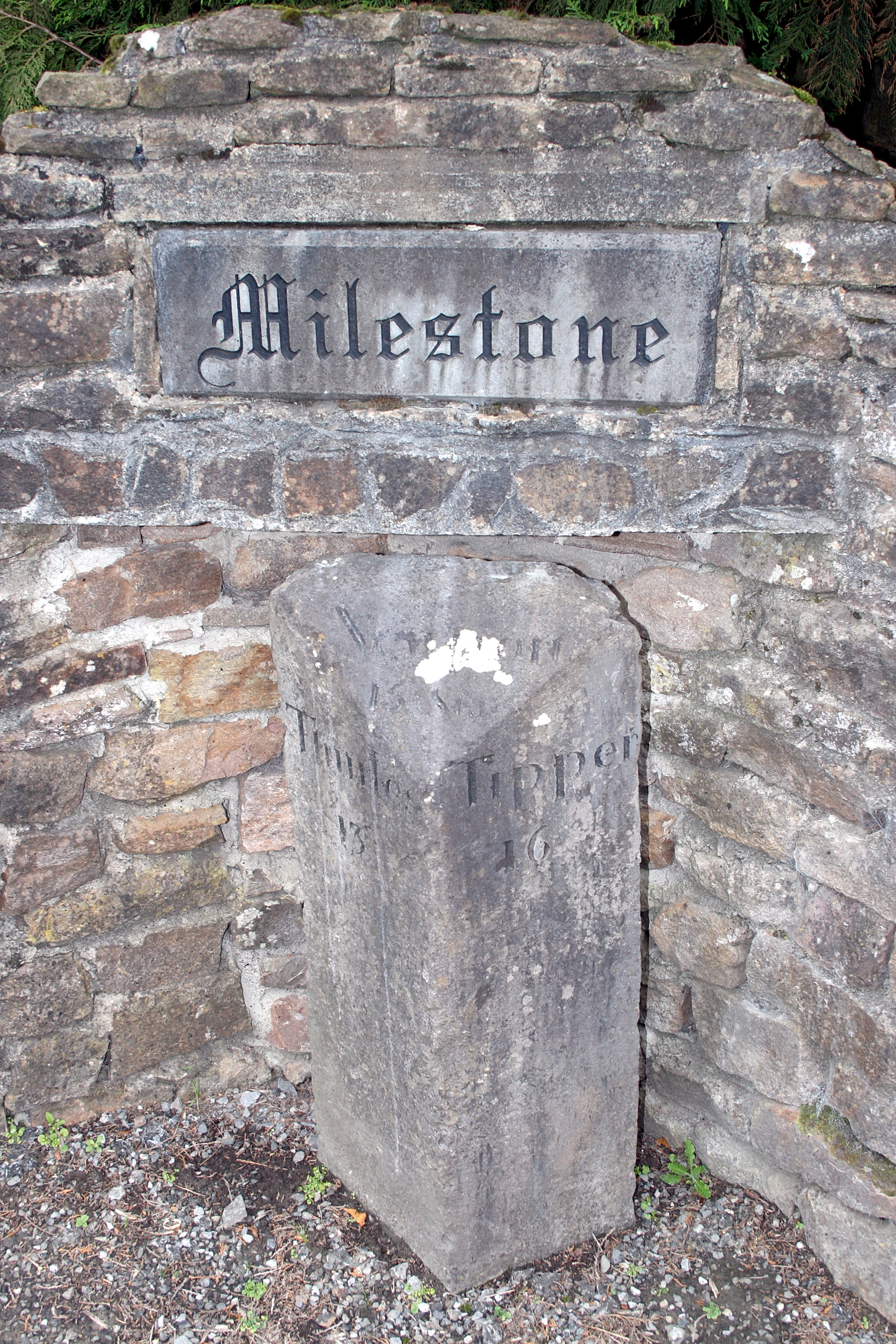
Milestone, County Tipperary

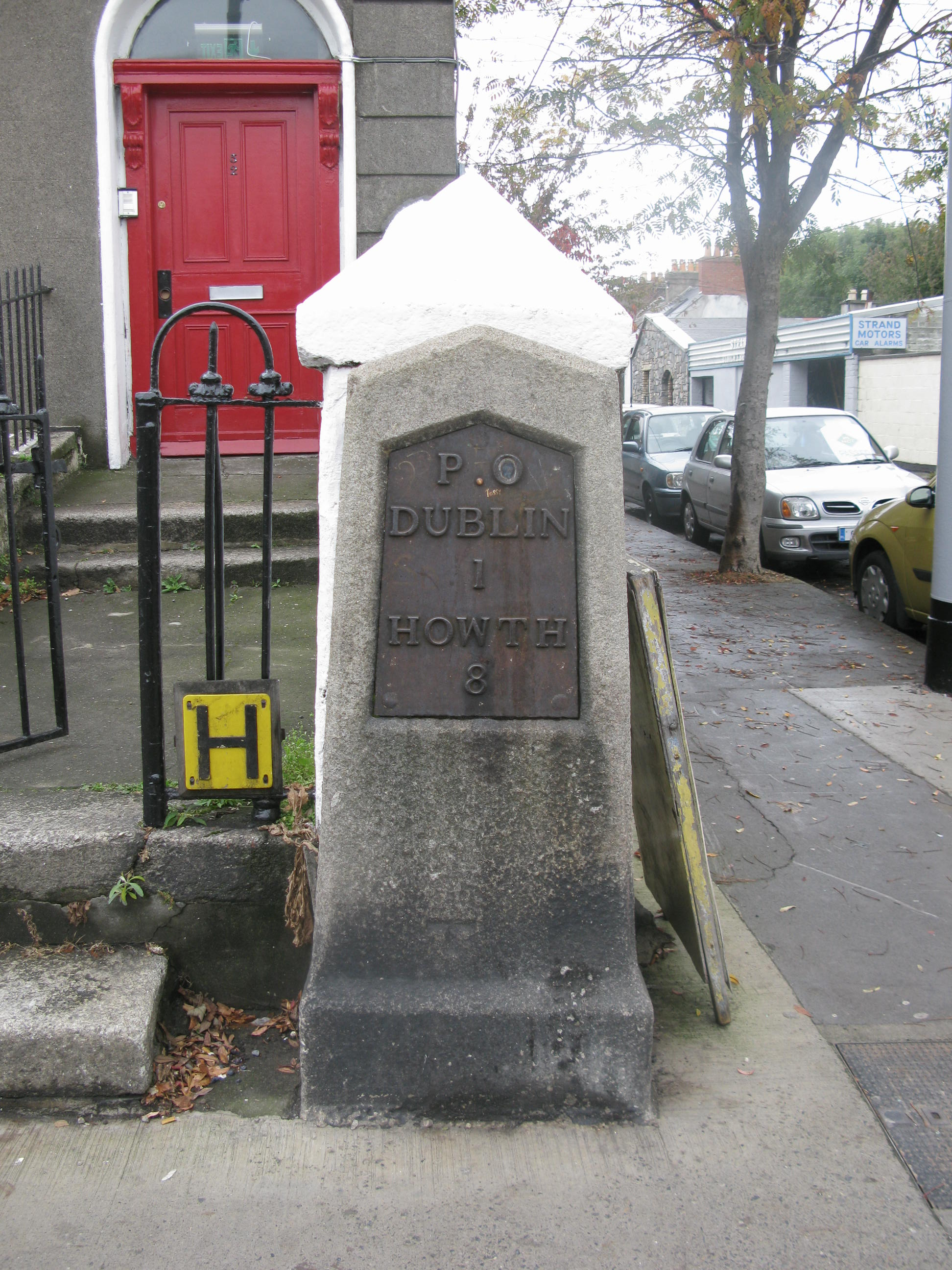
North Strand Dublin

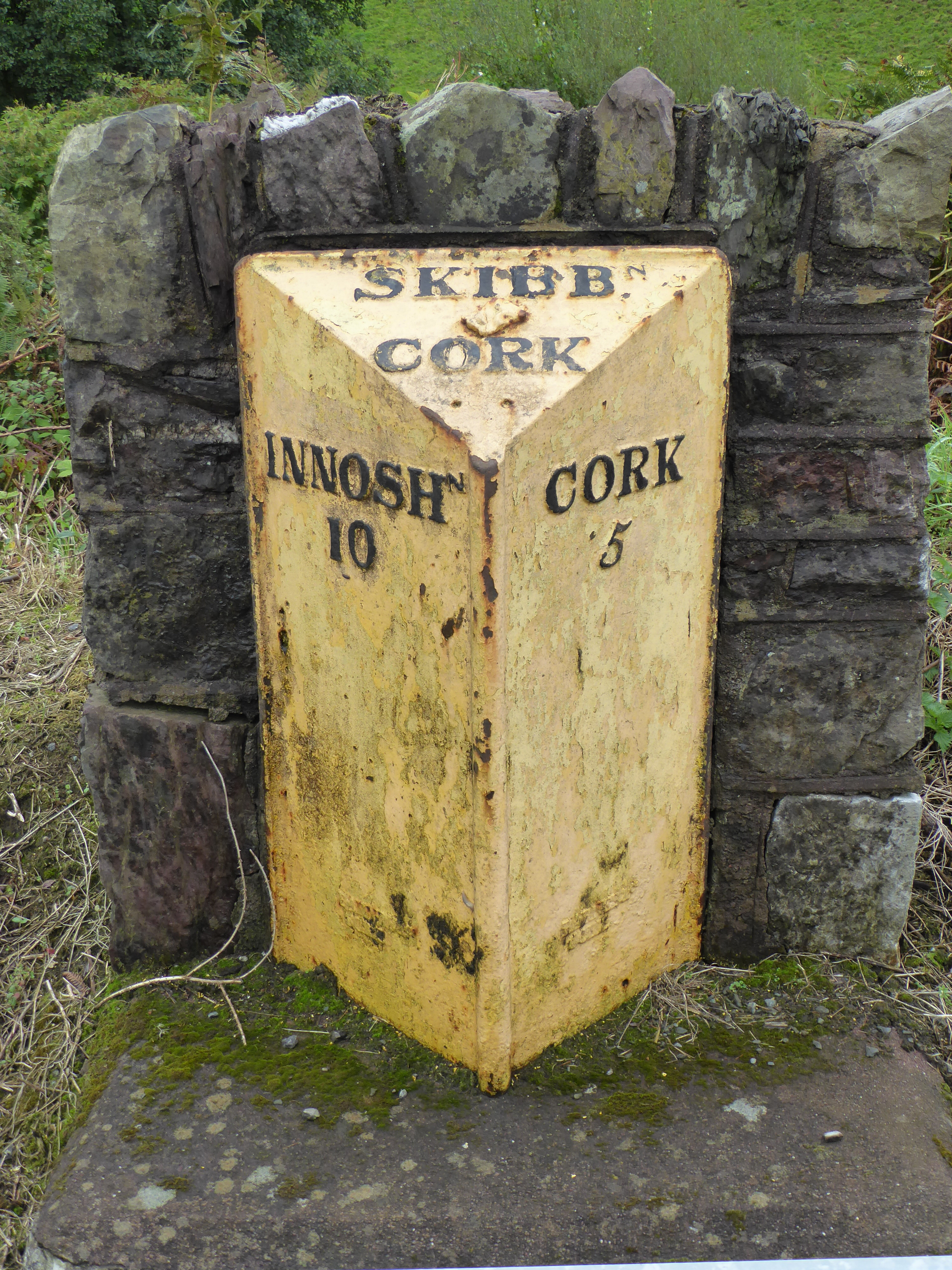
N71 in County Cork

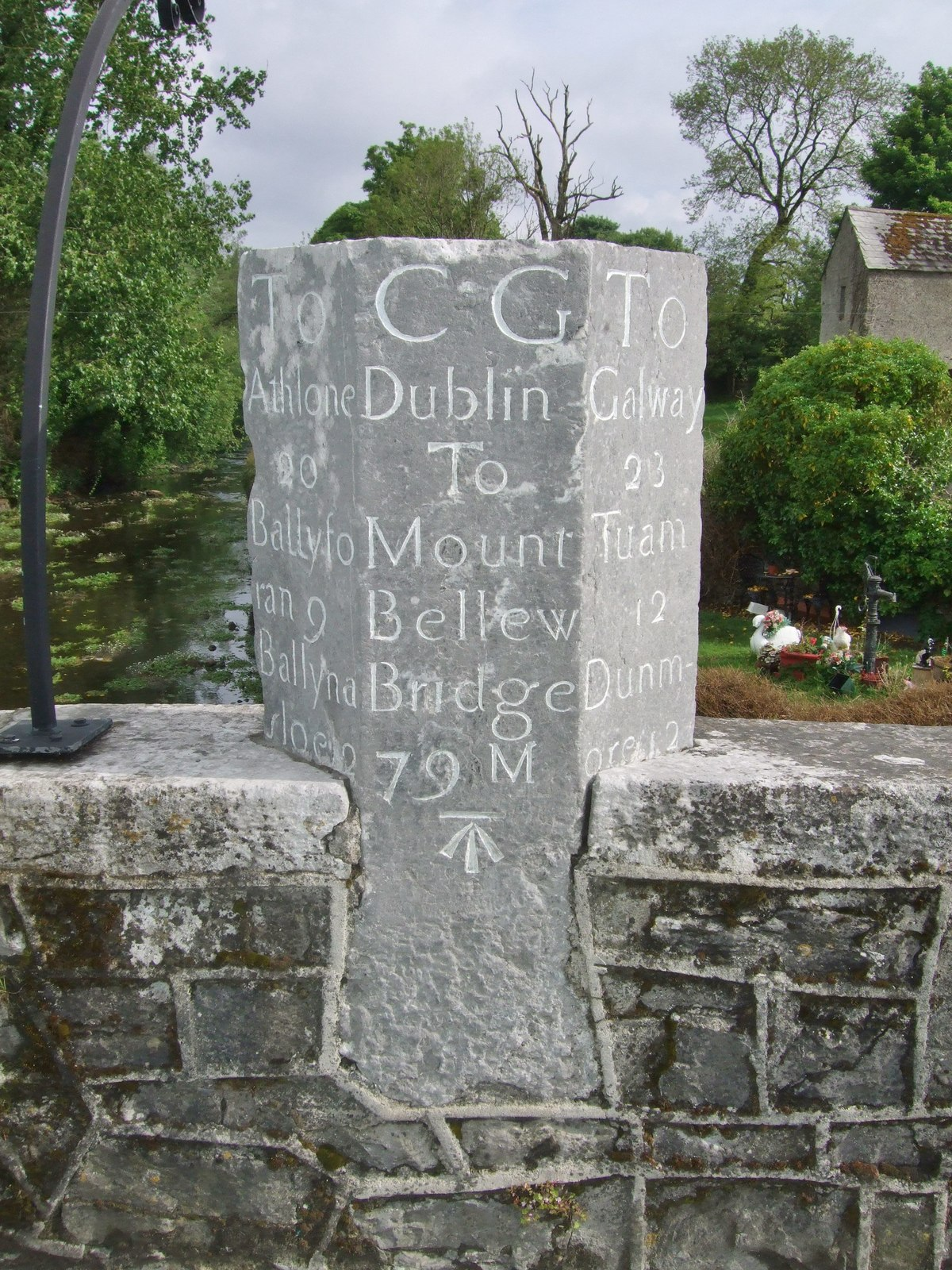
Mountbellew, County Galway
Malta

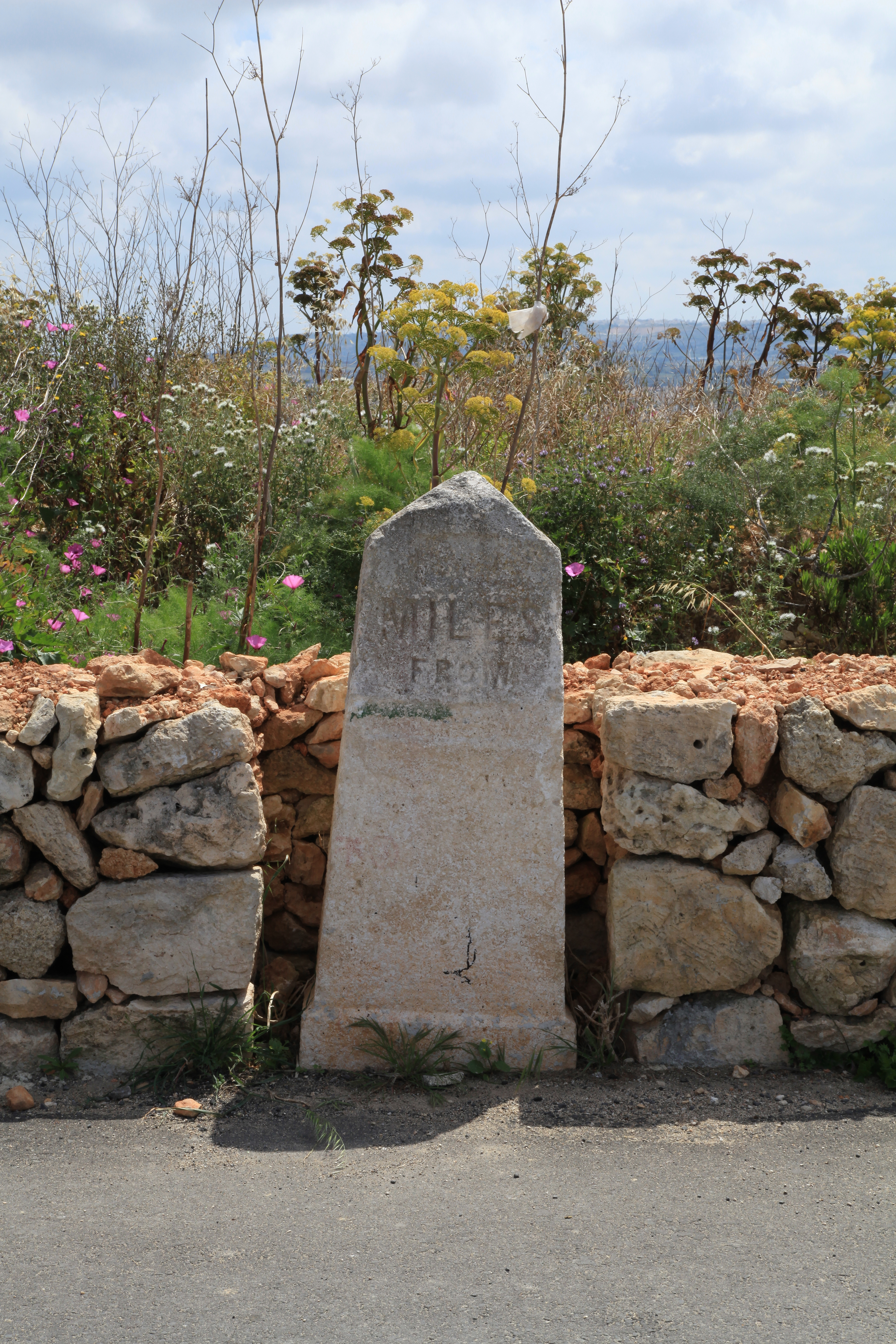
Mellieħa

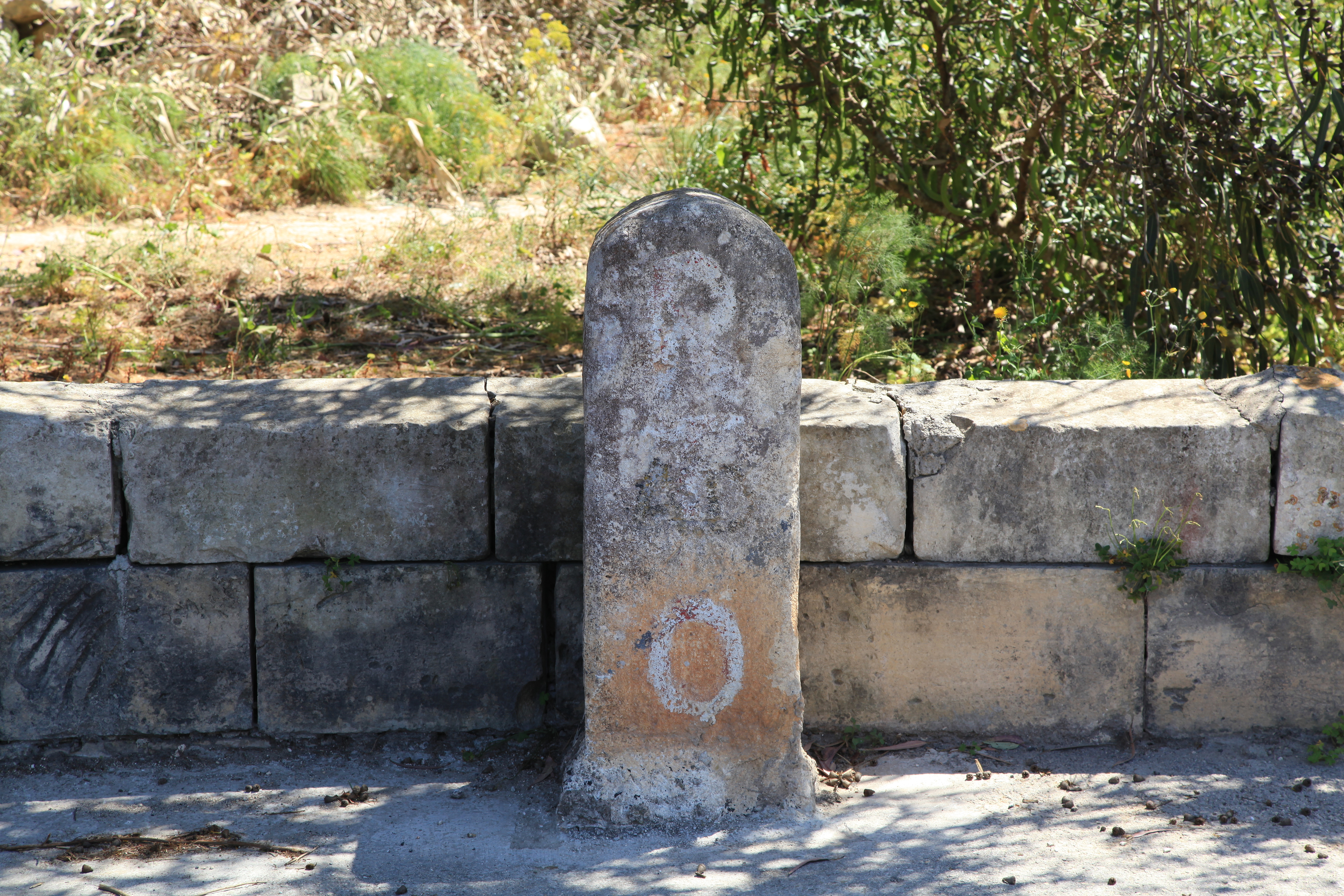
Swieqi
United States

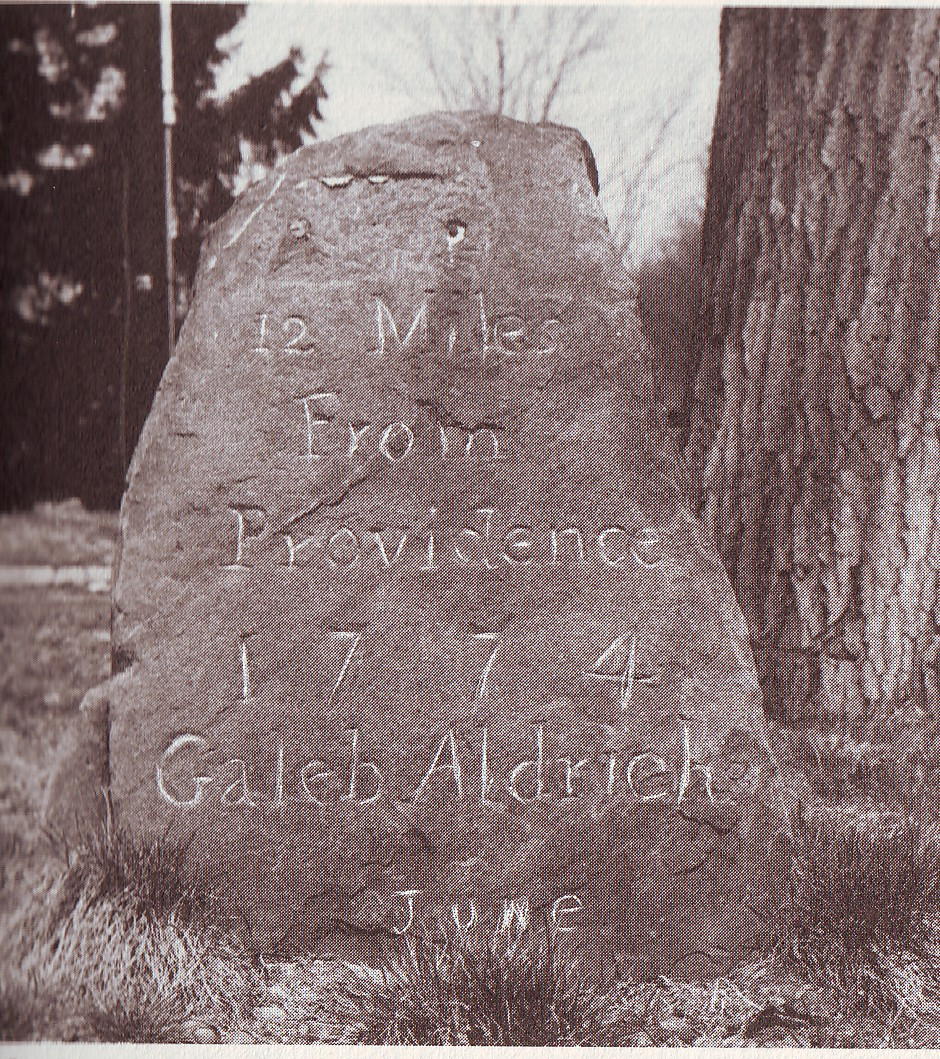
Great Road in Rhode Island

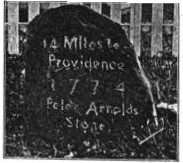
Great Road in Rhode Island

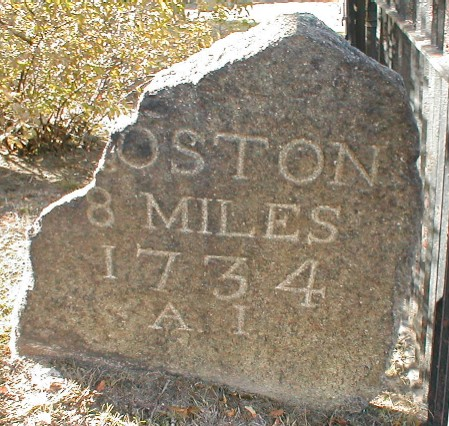
Upper Boston Post Road in Harvard Square, Massachusetts

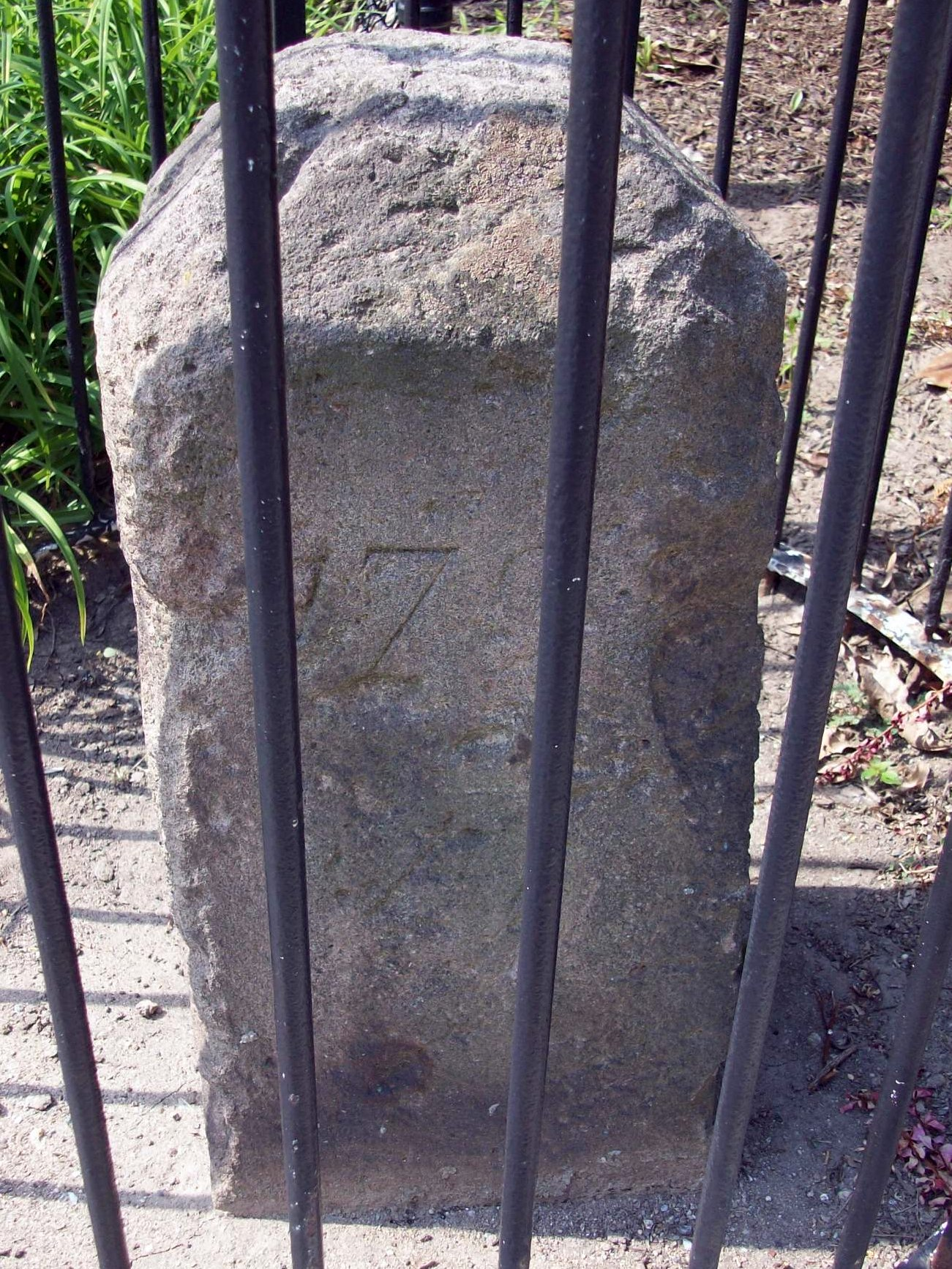
Boundary of the original District of Columbia

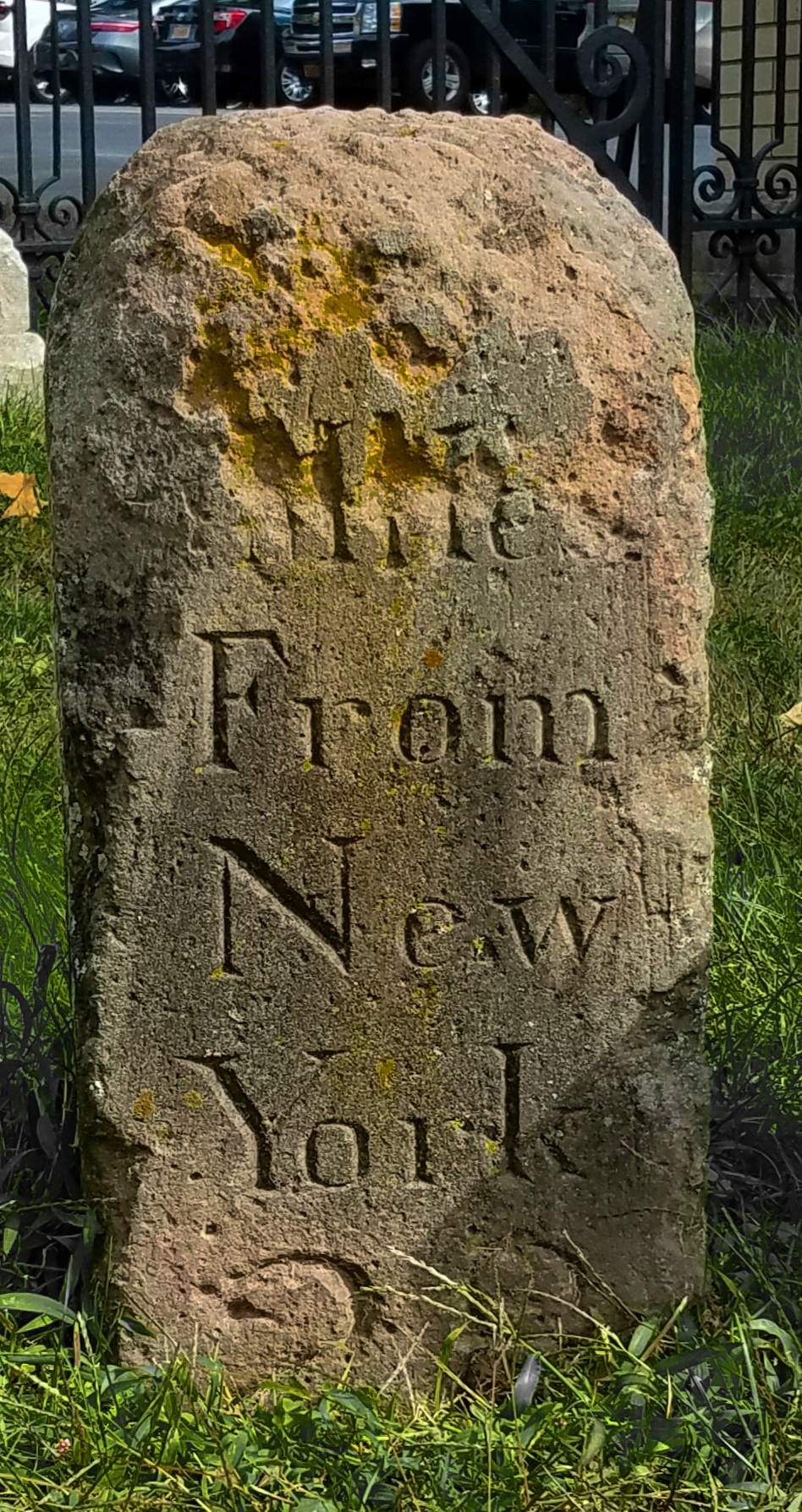
Albany Post Road (U.S. Route 9) in Sleepy Hollow, New York

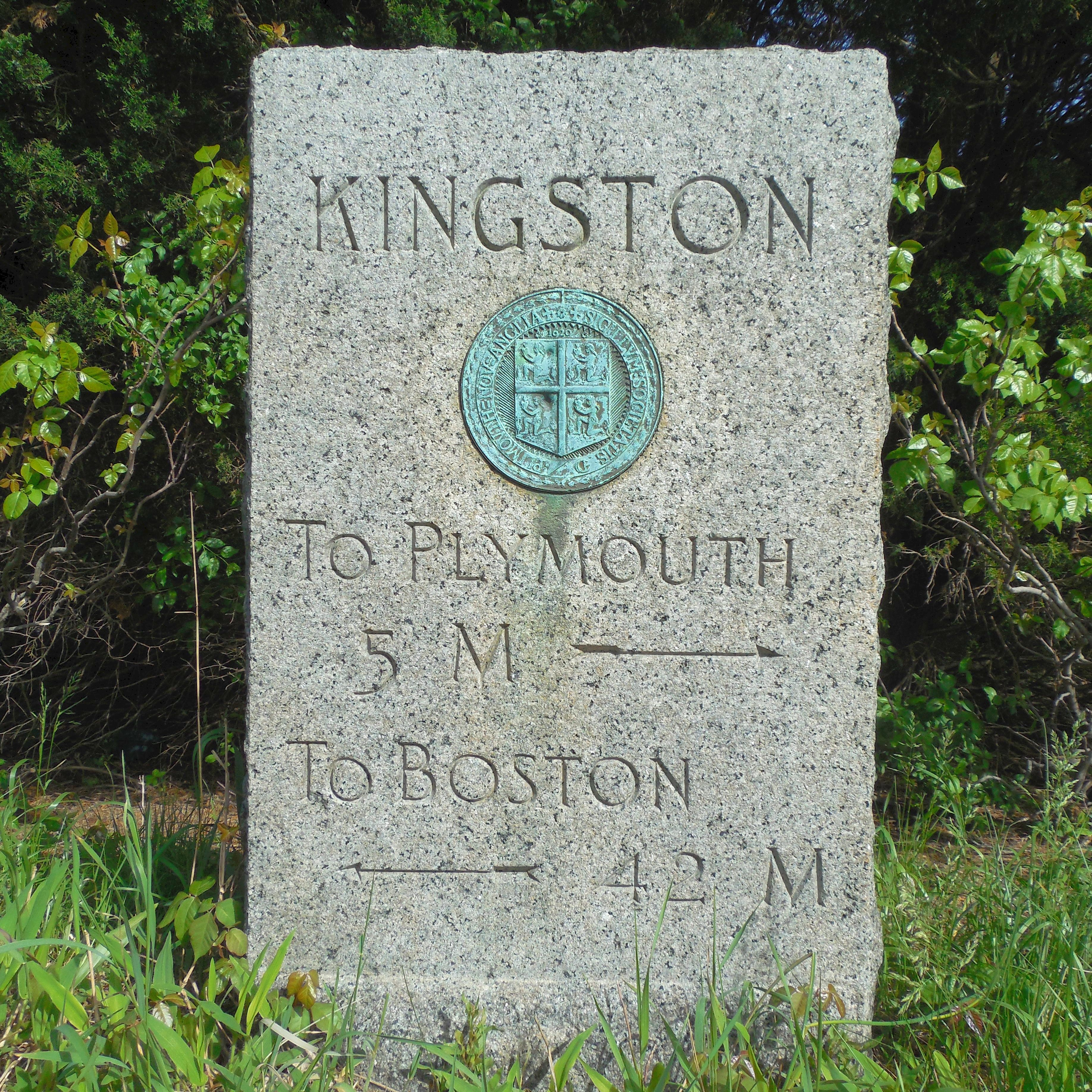
Kingston, Massachusetts, marking the 42nd parallel
Russia

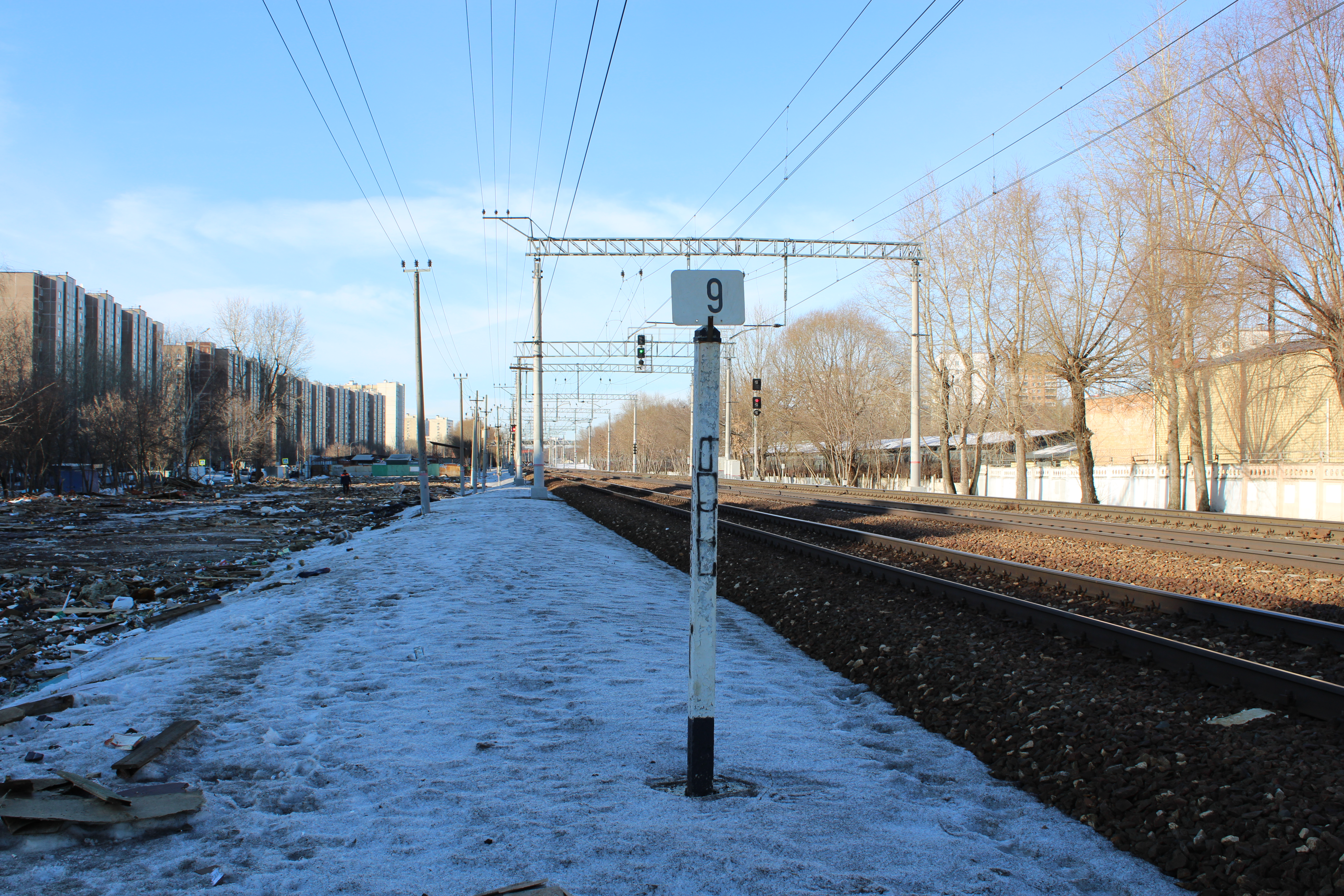
Savyolovskoye direction of Moscow Railway

== See also ==
- Boundary marker
- Exit number
- Ichirizuka
- Highway location marker
- Kilometre zero
- Milepost equation
- Parting stone
- Reassurance marker – a road sign with a route number, but no distance
- Survey marker
- Waymarking
