= Grizedale =

Hamlet in Cumbria, England

Coordinates: 54.342°N 3.022°W

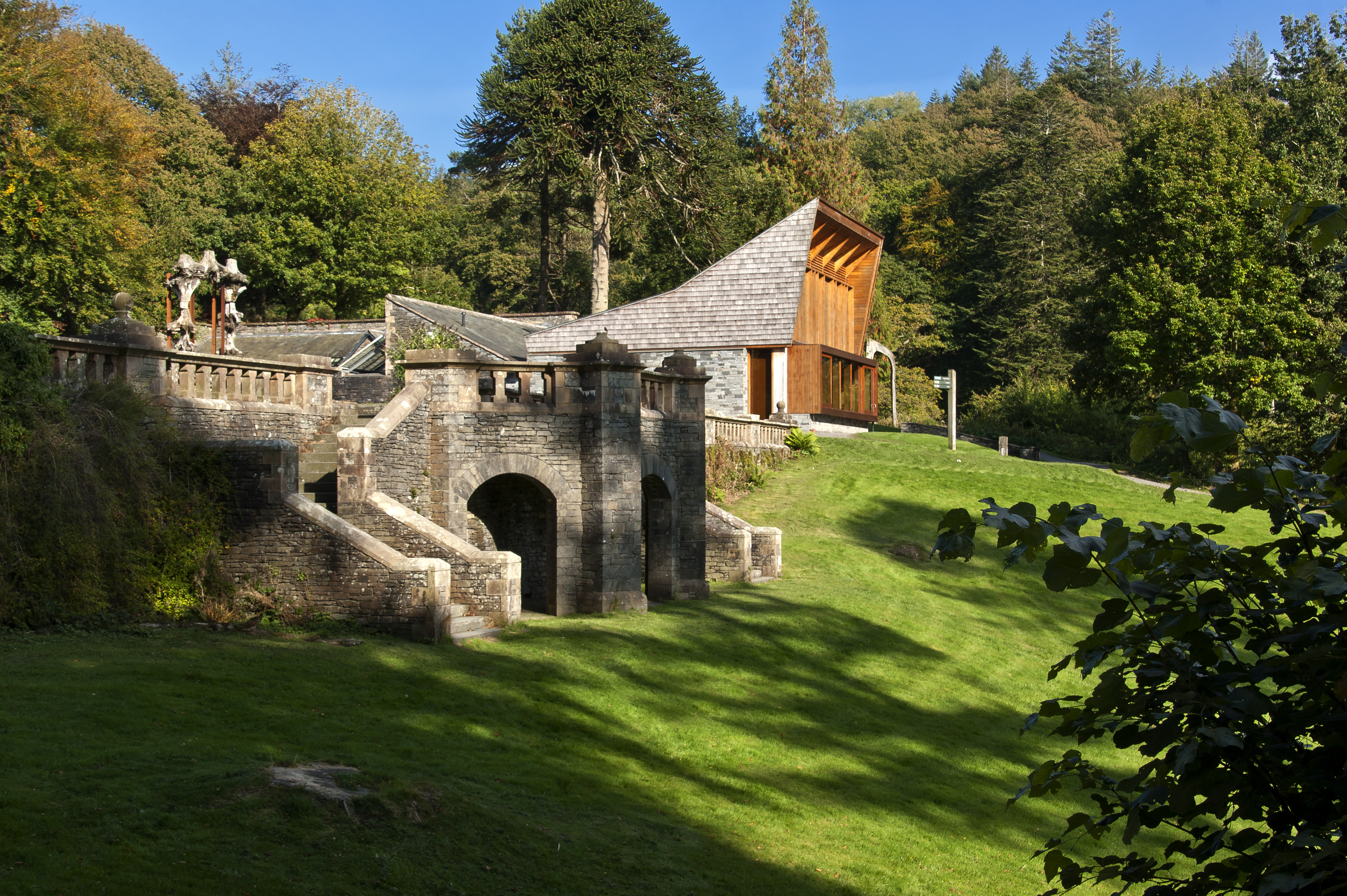
- The Yan, art gallery at Grizedale

- Location in South Lakeland Location within Cumbria
- OS grid reference: SD335945
- Civil parish: Satterthwaite
- Unitary authority: Westmorland and Furness
- Ceremonial county: Cumbria
- Region: North West
- Country: England
- Sovereign state: United Kingdom
- Post town: AMBLESIDE
- Postcode district: LA22
- Dialling code: 015394
- Police: Cumbria
- Fire: Cumbria
- Ambulance: North West
- UK Parliament: Westmorland and Lonsdale

Grizedale is a hamlet in the Lake District of North West England, in the middle of the Grizedale Forest, located north of Satterthwaite and south of Hawkshead. It is part of the civil parish of Satterthwaite. Historically, in the county of Lancashire, it now lies in the Westmorland and Furness district of Cumbria.

Attractions include extensive mountain bike trails and one of the Go Ape company's tree-top adventure courses. The forest is still notable for its sculptures. It used to be the home of Grizedale Arts, a contemporary arts residency and commissioning agency.

Grizedale is the location of the former Grizedale Hall – a forty-room mansion that was demolished in 1957. Before and after World War II, it was owned by the Forestry Commission. During the war, it was commandeered by the War Office and became officially known as No 1 POW Camp (Officers) Grizedale Hall, to hold German officer prisoners of war. As many of these were rescued survivors from sunken U-boats, it also became known as the "U-Boat Hotel". The fighter pilot Franz von Werra was initially held there, and also made one of the many escape attempts for which he is known. Another well-known prisoner was Otto Kretschmer, Germany's most successful U-boat captain until his capture.

An interactive woodland nature trail themed around the children's book Zog was installed at Grizedale in 2019.

== See also ==
- Grizedale College
- Grisedale Tarn
