= White bicycle =

White bicycle may refer to:

- Ghost bike or WhiteCycle, a bicycle roadside memorial
- Bicycle-sharing system § White bikes, aka free bikes
- Provo (movement) § The White Plans, one of the first bicycle-sharing systems
