= Shoe throwing =

Throwing shoes at targets, people or raised wires

Shoes may be thrown for various cultural reasons.

Footwear is used as a projectile in folk sports and cultural practices. Several sports and games are played around the world where participants throw shoes or boots at targets, or as far as possible. A pair of laced shoes may be thrown across raised cables, such as telephone wires and power lines, or onto tree branches to create "shoe trees". In such contexts it may be known as shoefiti.

== Throwing onto wires ==
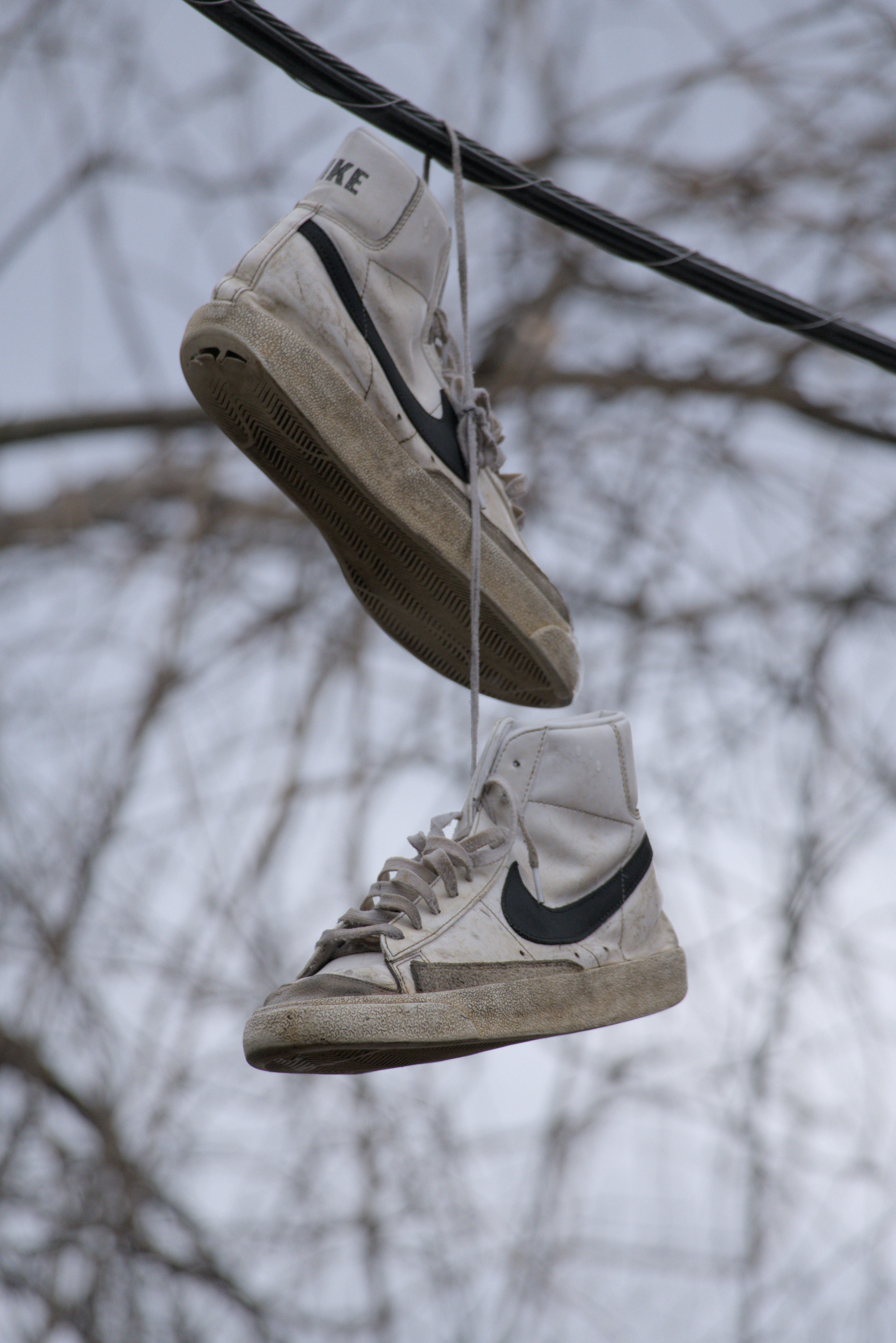
Nike shoes thrown over a telephone wire in Charlottesville, Virginia

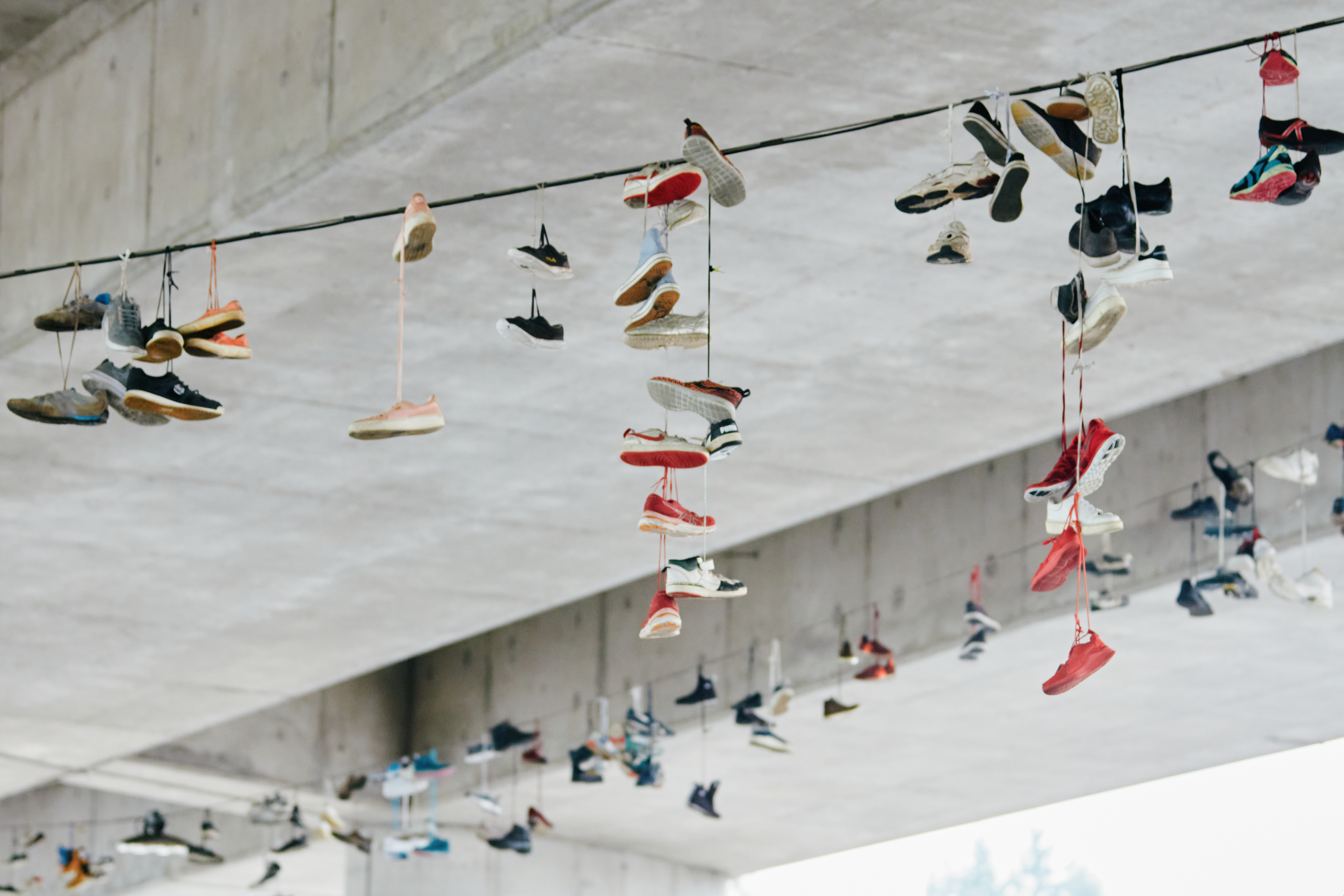
A large number of shoes on wires in Bern, Switzerland in 2026

Shoes are thrown onto wires in both rural and urban areas, and their perceived meaning varies from region to region. Often, the shoes are sneakers.

Some theories suggest the custom originated with members of the military, who are said to have thrown military boots, often painted orange or some other conspicuous color, at overhead wires as a part of a rite of passage after completing basic training or when leaving the service. In the 1997 film Wag the Dog, shoe tossing is an allegedly spontaneous tribute to Sgt. William Schumann, played by Woody Harrelson, who has purportedly been shot down behind enemy lines in Albania.

Shoe-tossing may be a form of bullying, where a bully steals a pair of shoes and tosses them where they are unlikely to be retrieved. Shoes are sometimes thrown into a tree to festoon it as a "shoe tree". Occasionally, a powerline pole or other wooden object may be decorated in the same way.

=== Gang messaging ===
Shoes on a telephone wire are popularly said to be linked to organized crime, signifying the location of gang turf, commemorating the death of a gang member or a non-gang member who lived in the area. The shoes are also rumored to mark a spot for drug deals or to indicate a nearby crack-house, in which case they can be called "crack tennies".

A 2003 newsletter from former Los Angeles, California, mayor James Hahn cited fears of many L.A. residents that "these shoes indicate sites at which drugs are sold or worse yet, gang turf," and that city and utility employees had launched a program to remove the shoes.

However, it is difficult to determine whether shoes were placed by gang members for gang-related purposes, and police officers in several jurisdictions believe it to be a myth. More conclusively, a 2015 study of shoe-tossing data in Chicago failed to establish a causal connection between drug dealing and shoefiti.

== Wedding customs ==
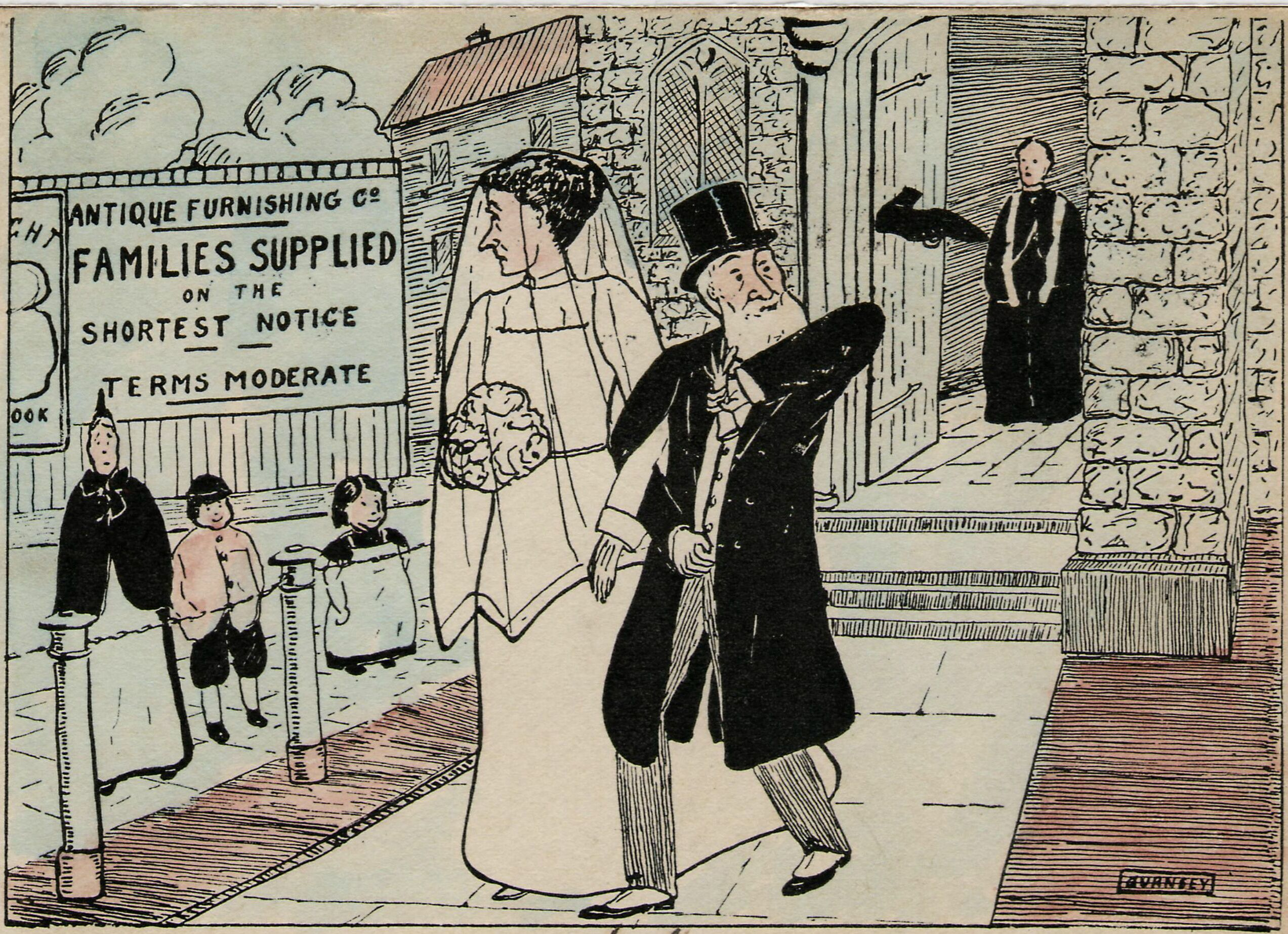
1905 British humorous postcard showing a shoe being thrown in a comically violent manner at a bridegroom

Shoe-throwing is a wedding superstition in several cultures. In Victorian England, people would pelt "a bride and bridegroom with old shoes when they start on their honeymoon." In Charles Dickens' novel David Copperfield (1850), the custom is recorded by the narrator following his marriage to Dora Spenlow:

When we were all in a bustle outside the door, I found that Mr. Peggotty was prepared with an old shoe, which was to be thrown after us for luck, and which he offered to Mrs. Gummidge for that purpose.

In 1887, an article in The New York Times observed that: "[The] custom of throwing one or more old shoes after the bride and groom either when they go to church to be married or when they start on their wedding journey, is so old that the memory of man stretches not back to its beginning."

Peter Ditchfield, writing in Old English Customs Extant at the Present Time (1896), expands: "We also throw old shoes after young married folk in order to express our wishes for their good fortune. Probably this was not the original meaning of the custom. The throwing of a shoe after a bride was a symbol of renunciation of dominion and authority over her by her father or guardian, and this receipt of the shoe by the bridegroom was an omen that the authority was transferred to him. In Kent the shoe is thrown by the principal bridesmaid, and the others run after it. It is supposed that she who gets it will be married first. It is then thrown amongst the men, and he who is hit will be first wedded."

== Protest ==
In many Arab cultures, showing the sole of one's shoe is considered insulting, as it is regarded as unclean for its contact with the ground. Attacking a person with a shoe can be seen as "adding insult to injury".

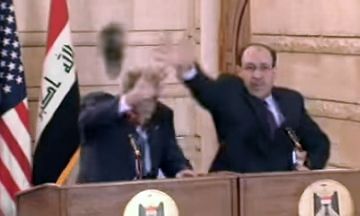
U.S. president George W. Bush ducking a thrown shoe while Iraq prime minister Nouri al-Maliki attempts to catch it.

In 2008, Iraqi journalist Muntadar al-Zaidi was arrested for throwing two shoes at United States President George W. Bush while the president was visiting Baghdad in protest against the American military invasion and subsequent occupation. Al-Zaidi shouted in Arabic: "This is a farewell kiss from the Iraqi people, dog! This is from the widows, the orphans and those killed in Iraq!" President Bush ducked and was not struck by the shoes.

Shoe throwing as an insult is not limited to the Arab world; other notable incidents have involved celebrities and world leaders including Steve McCarthy, David Beckham, Lily Allen, and Wen Jiabao.

== Sports and games ==
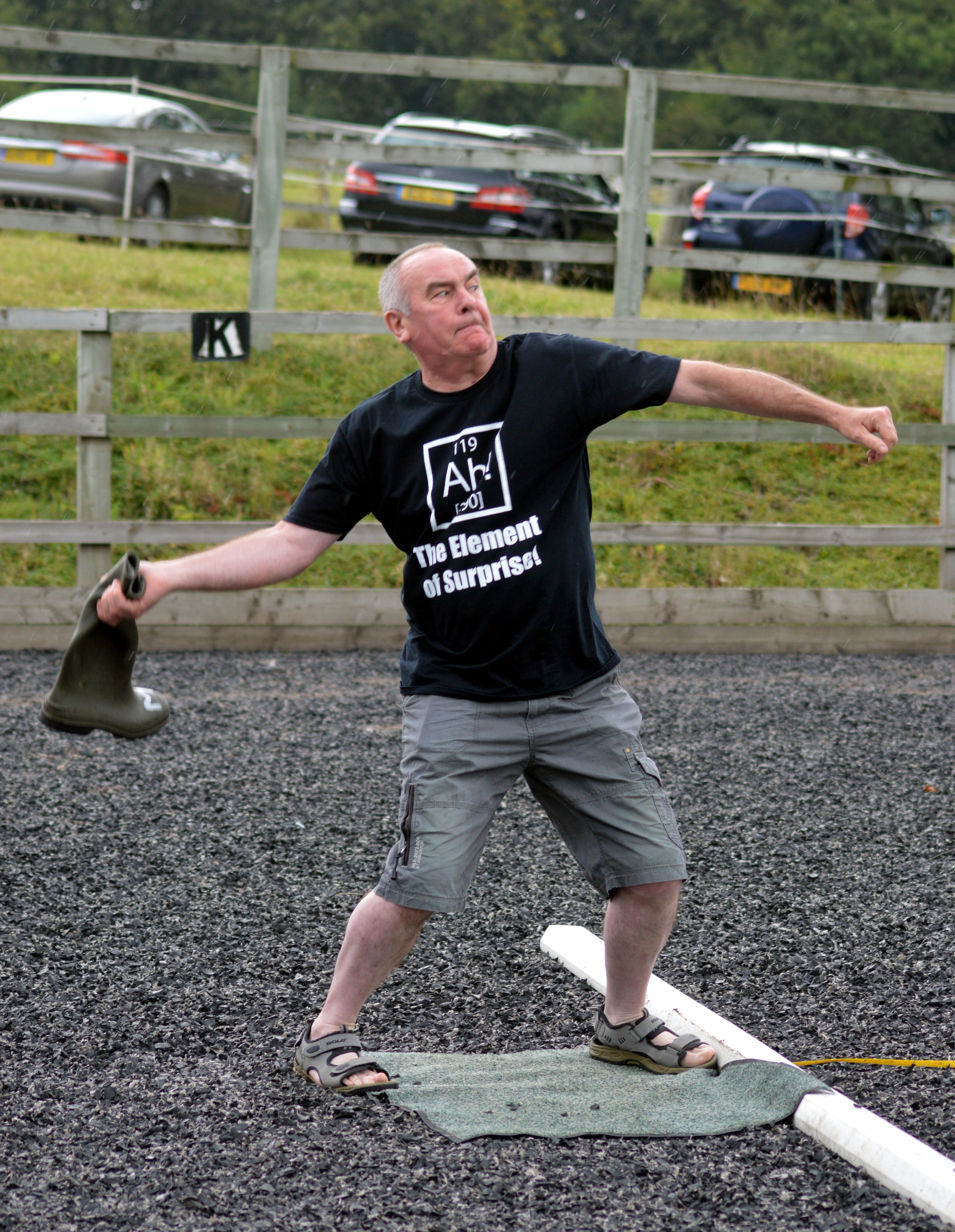
A competitor at a wellie wanging sporting event

Wellie wanging, also known as boot throwing or gumboot tossing, is a sport in which competitors are required to throw a Wellington boot as far as possible. The sport appears to have originated in the West Country of England in the 1970s, and rapidly became a popular activity at village fêtes and fundraising events across Britain.

Shoes have also been turned into objects for many other group activities and games that involve throwing, but which don't involve throwing shoes over a wire or branch. One physical education game has participants put into two groups. The two groups create two lines by sitting parallel to one another. The participants then take off their shoes and throw them into the middle of the playing area, which is in between the two groups. The game starts when the teacher or referee says so. The goal of the game is for the participants to stand up from their lines and run to the middle to find their shoe. Participants then have to put their shoes back on and sit back in the same order they were sitting. The first group to get everyone back to the line wins.

Another example of a shoe-based game is a smaller group activity that requires two pairs of shoes, two chairs, two plastic bottles, and two participants. The bottles are placed in the center of the gameplay area, and the chairs are positioned on opposite sides of the bottles, so that the game play area forms a line. The two participants start in the middle by the bottles, run to their chair, sit down, take their shoes off, and throw their shoes at the bottles. Whoever hits their bottle over first wins.

== See also ==
- Abandoned footwear – Shoes lost or discarded in public
- Bolas – Type of weighted throwing weapon used in South America
- Ghost shoes – Memorial to pedestrian traffic fatality
- List of shoe-throwing incidents
- Panty tree – Tree adorned with women's underwear, commonly found below ski lifts
