= Roadside memorial =

Marker that usually commemorates a site where a person died

Roadside memorial, Virginia, United States

A roadside memorial, also referred to as a descanso, is a marker that usually commemorates a site where a person died suddenly and unexpectedly, away from home. Unlike a grave site headstone, which marks where a body is laid, the memorial marks the last place on earth where a person was alive – although in the past travelers were, out of necessity, often buried where they fell.

Usually the memorial is created and maintained by family members or friends of the person who died. A common type of memorial is simply a bunch of flowers, real or plastic, taped to street furniture or a tree trunk. A handwritten message, personal mementos, etc. may be included. More sophisticated memorials may be a memorial cross, ghost bike, ghost shoes, or a plaque with an inscription, decorated with flowers or wreaths.

Roadside memorials tend to be clustered along the busiest roadways and often at intersections.

== Meaning and message ==
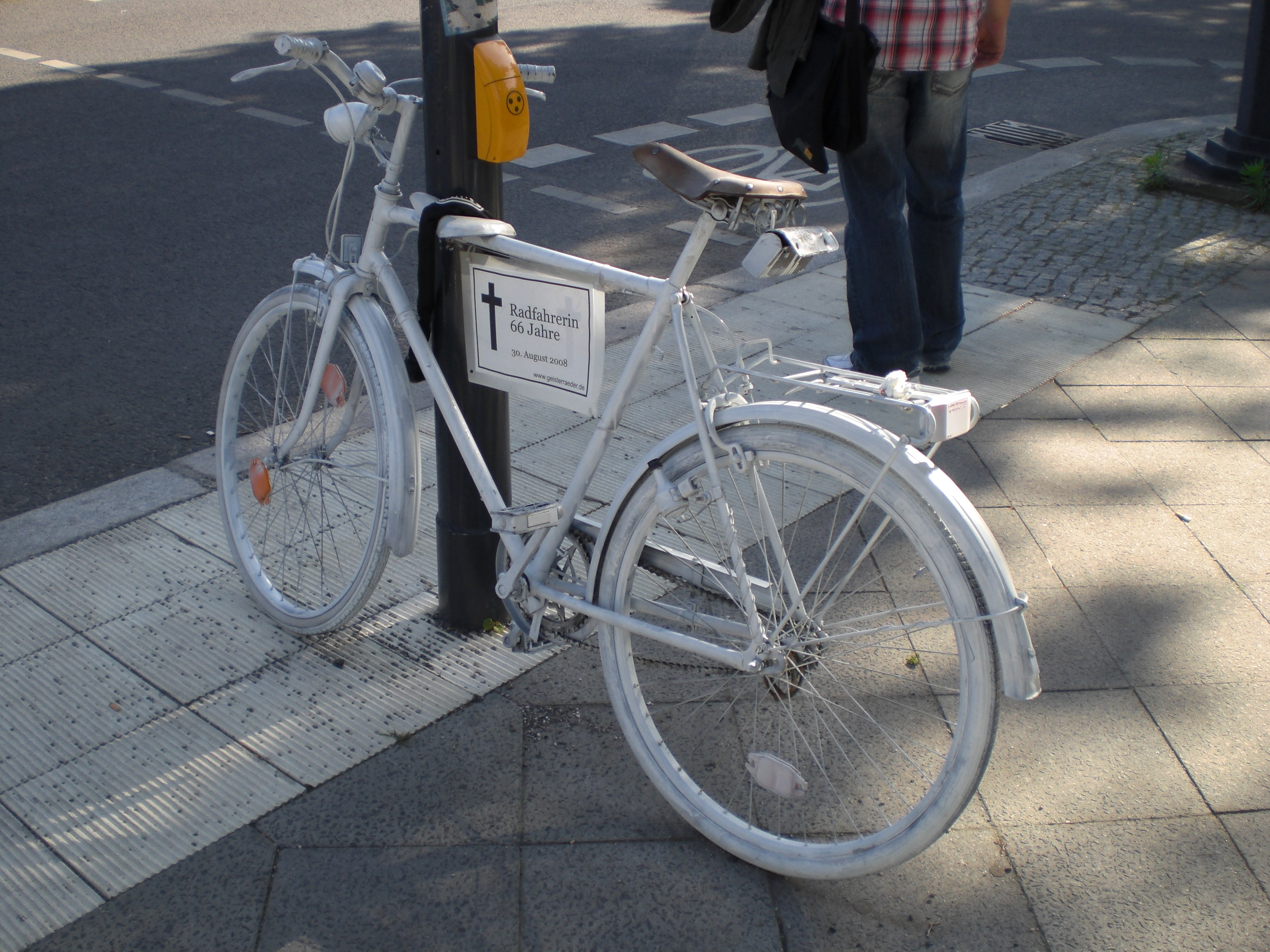
A ghost bike in Berlin.

Roadside memorials are a statement of grief and love from the loved ones of the accident victim or victims.

As well as their personal significance, these memorials also serve as a reminder and warning to other road users of the dangers of driving, and to encourage safer driving. In the 1940s and 1950s, the Arizona Highway Patrol began using white crosses to mark the site of fatal car accidents. This practice was continued by families of road-crash victims after it had been abandoned by the police. The ghost bike phenomenon, where an old bicycle is painted white and locked up at an accident site, serves the same purpose in relation to cycling casualties.

Historically, roadside memorials were personal memorials, but there is a modern trend toward public memorials of increasingly large size. It is not uncommon for many roadside memorials to lack proper maintenance as time passes.

The phenomenon of roadside memorials may be associated with another growing trend: spontaneous memorials, being grassroots acts of commemoration that appear soon after the a tragic or unexpected event, such as terrorist attacks, murders, and the death of celebrities. The death of Diana, Princess of Wales, for example, precipitated an avalanche of flowers and wreaths at the Pont de l'Alma road tunnel in Paris, the site of her death, and at Kensington Palace, her home in London.

While car-crash victims are rarely so well known, something of the same sort of impulse to make a public display of emotion at the site of a tragedy may be partly responsible for the growing popularity of roadside memorials. The broad phenomenon of creating improvised and temporary memorials after traumatic death (accidents, murder, disasters etc.) has become popular since the 1980s. Because of their non-institutionalized character they are generically coined as grassroots memorials.

== History and practice ==
Roadside memorials have been erected around the world for centuries. Their legality varies from country to country.

=== Australia ===
Accounts of roadside memorials in Australia exist as early as 1908, when, what was described as "a rough cross near Mount Compass" was erected near where Miss Mabel May May had been thrown from a horse, and subsequently died. The number of memorials erected in Australia since 1990 has increased considerably. In 2003, it was estimated that one in five road deaths were memorialized at the site of the crash.

=== Ukraine ===
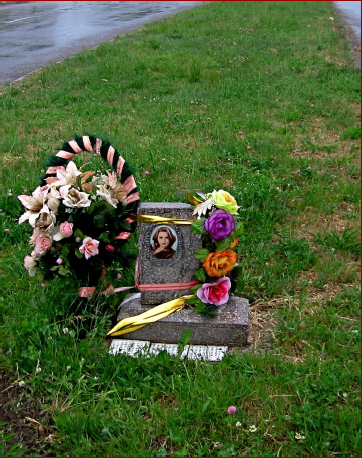
A roadside memorial in Ukraine

First mentions of roadside crosses in the Ukrainian territory date from the 11th century. Historically, they would be installed on the graves of suicide victims or murdered travellers, as there was a ban to bury these categories of people in a regular cemetery. According to the notes of Józef Ignacy Kraszewski, in 19th-century Volhynia such roadside burials served as locations of prayer, and every passerby would leave a twig on the site in memory of the deceased. In Sloboda Ukraine crosses with urns containing remains of people who were murdered or killed at war would be installed by the victims' relatives and located at road forks and on entrances to settlements.

In Ukrainian traditional culture, the roadside cross was seen as an element of protection of a particular area from natural disasters, fires, epidemics, wars and evil forces in general. Historically, many crosses were installed by locals during times of hardship, with the work having to start after sunset and end before dawn. In Volhynia, it was common to decorate roadside crosses with shirts worn by children who died in infancy; if a child recuperated from an illness, a special apron would be made as a sign of gratitude and also put on the cross. Soldiers going to war would tie bands on roadside crosses, promising to return alive. During epidemics, villagers would engage in nighttime processions, burying pieces of cloth under every cross they passed.

Ukrainian roadside crosses are traditionally decorated with rushnyks, pieces of cloth, bands and flowers, which serve as amulets against evil forces. In some cases, crucifixes, instruments of torture, and even ladders and silver coins are included in the decoration of the crosses, alluding to the Passions of Christ. The adornments are removed from the cross before Lent and put back on Palm Sunday. In absence of a church in the village, the roadside cross can take religious functions, serving as a place of Easter blessings and hosting participants of weddings and funeral ceremonies. Some roadside burials have become places of pilgrimage and are believed to possess healing properties.

In modern Ukraine it is common to place a roadside memorial on the site of a deadly car or motorcycle crash. It is usually a cross or a small monument with a wreath of flowers. There are also usually fresh flowers regularly placed by the cross if the relatives of the person who died live close enough to look after the memorial. Sometimes Ukrainian roadside memorials can be more elaborate, including a small granite or marble gravestone and/or a picture of the loved one.

=== Poland ===
Country roads, where most of the deadly accidents occur are often decorated with localised shrines, flowers, crosses and plaques in name of the person passed. Improvements in road safety causes decline of memorials' number.

=== United Kingdom ===
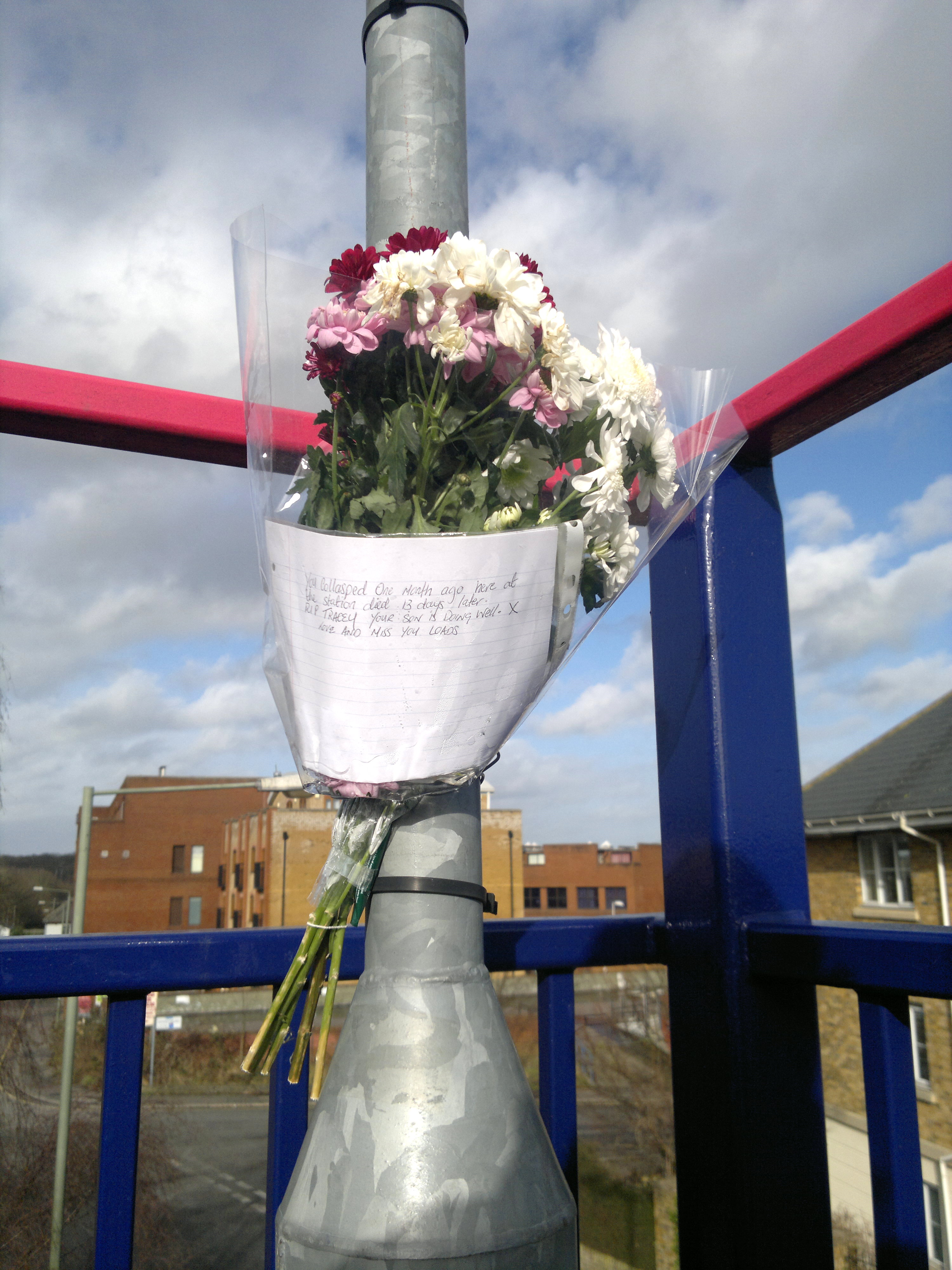
A tribute at a North London railway station. The message reads: "You collapsed one month ago here at the station died 13 days later. RIP Tracey your son is doing well. X Love and miss you loads"

In the United Kingdom, the practice of erecting roadside memorials has recently generated a media debate about the danger these memorials may pose to other road users and to people erecting them in unsafe places. This debate has been sparked by accounts of dangerous actions, such as when an adult crosses a main road with a child to place a tribute. Some jurisdictions already enforce local regulations, and police officials and local councilors have suggested that uniform rules be introduced across the country. For example, according to the BBC, in Merthyr Tydfil, memorials will only be allowed where it is deemed safe and appropriate, and they will be removed after three months.

=== United States ===
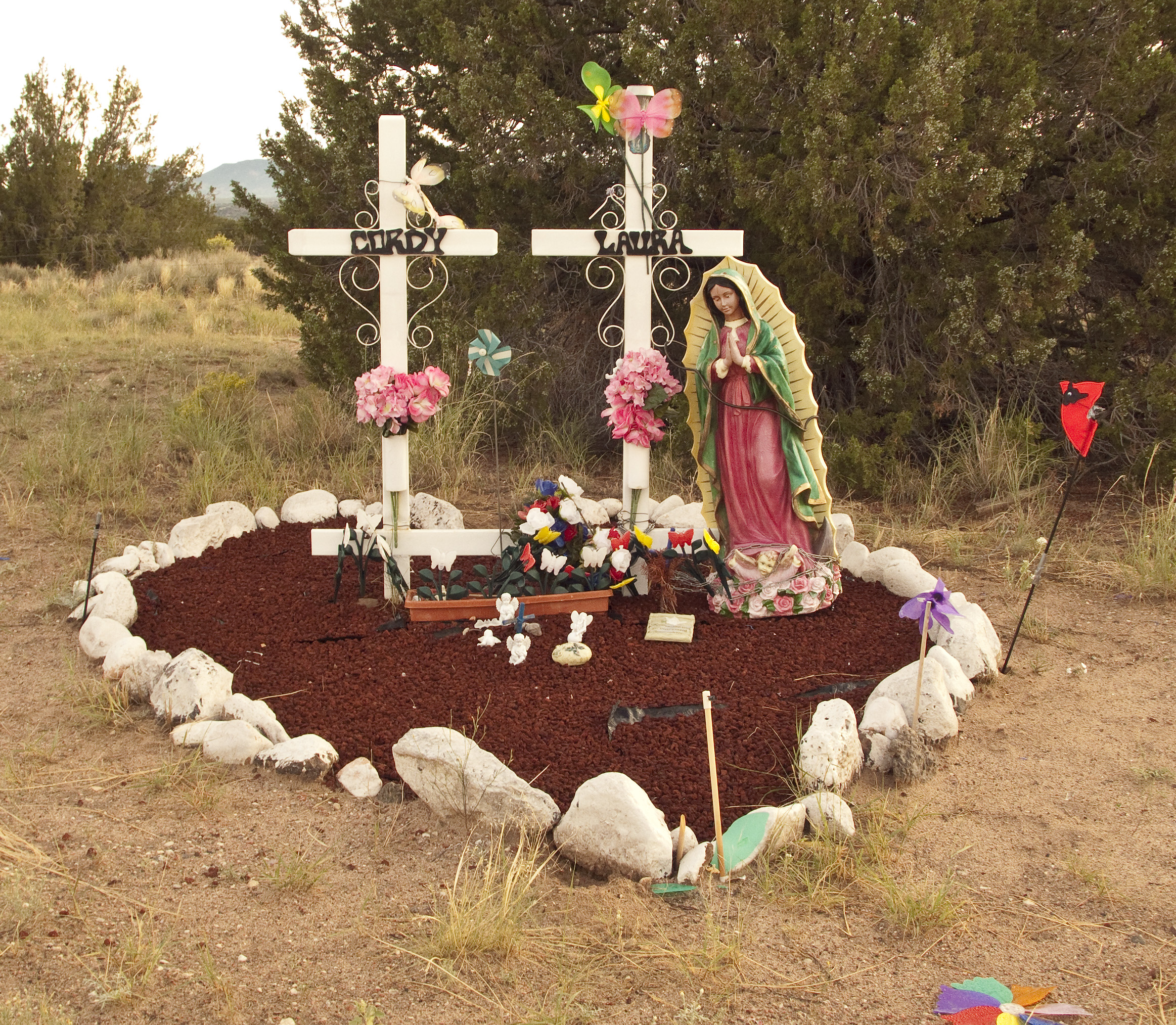
Descanso near Rio Rancho, New Mexico

The spread of spontaneous roadside memorials to mark the site of fatal traffic accidents in the United States is a relatively new phenomenon. There is a gravestone-style memorial in Ellington, Connecticut marking a child's death in 1812. A typical memorial includes a cross (usually wooden), flowers, hand-painted signs, and, in the case of a child's death, stuffed animals.

The origin of roadside crosses in the United States has its roots with the early Mexican settlers of the south-western United States, and are common in areas with large Hispanic populations. Formerly, in funerary processions where a group would proceed from a church to a graveyard carrying a coffin, the bearers would take a rest, or descanso in Spanish, and wherever they set the coffin down, a cross would be placed there in memory of the event. The modern practice of roadside shrines commemorate the last place a person was alive before receiving fatal injuries, even if they should actually die in a hospital after the crash.

In the southwestern United States, they are also common at historic parajes on old long distance trails, going back to the roots of the tradition, and also marked the graves of people who died while traveling. A descanso memorial may be decorated especially for the holidays, and for significant anniversaries in the person's life. A descanso memorial for a child may be decorated with special toys, even toy vignettes of family life, and votive candles may be placed there on special nights.

In the United States, the legal situation varies from state to state.

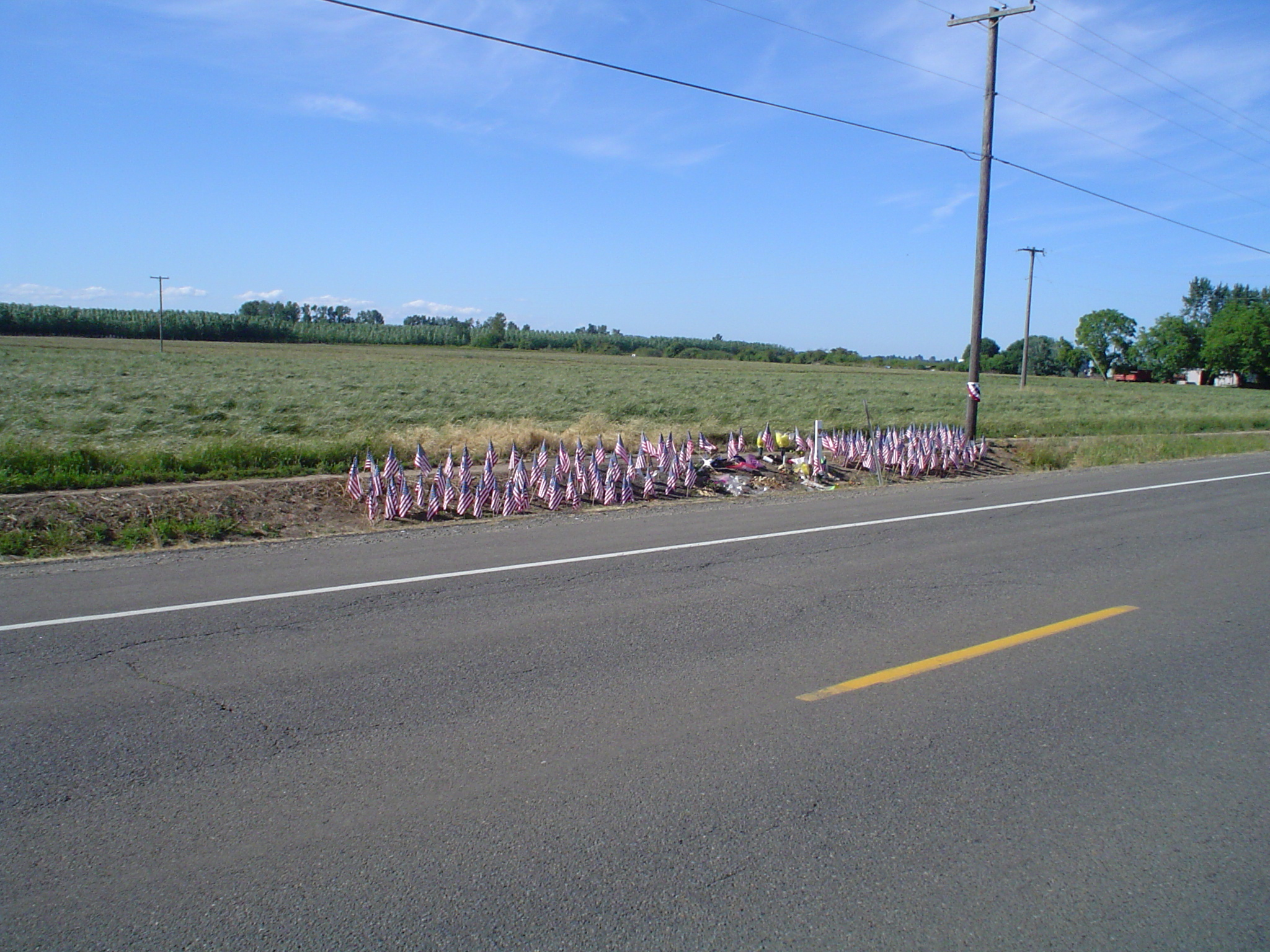
Roadside memorial to fallen police officer in Gervais, Oregon.

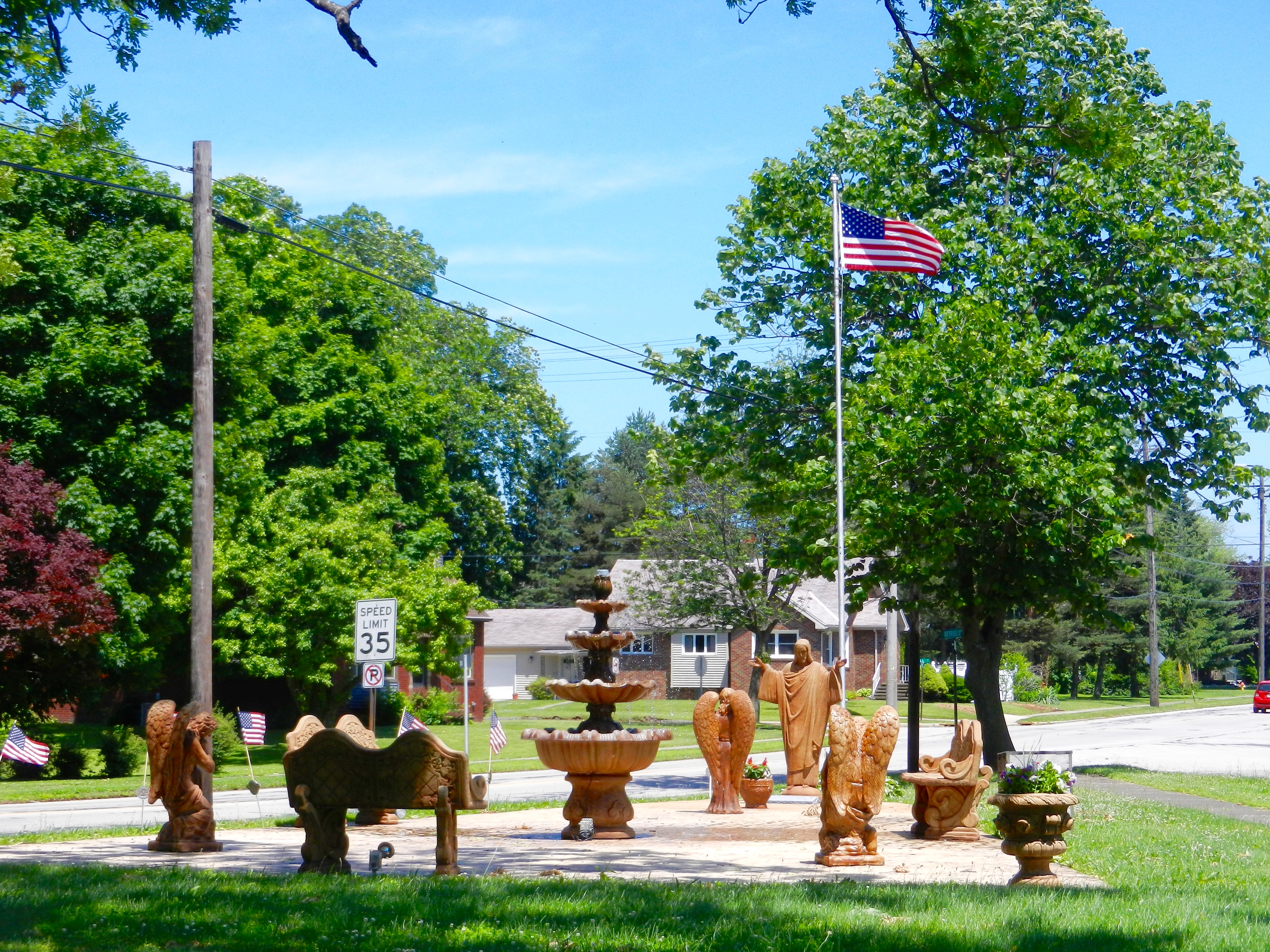
A roadside memorial fountain with a statue of Jesus and three angels in Conneaut, Ohio.

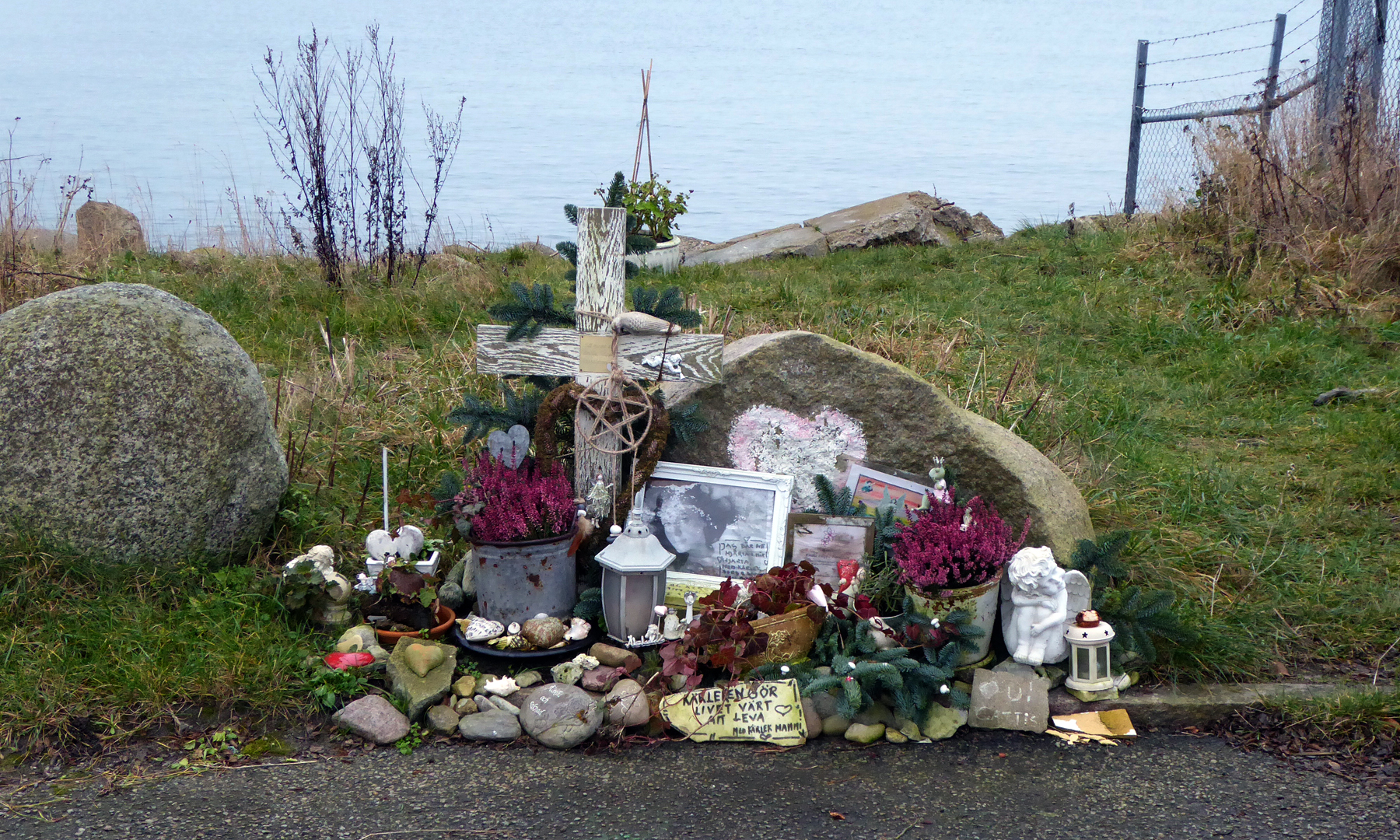
A memorial site for a young girl who took her life in the ocean in Ystad 2013. The site is still being visited and maintained in 2020.

In New Mexico, Department of Transportation crews undertaking new construction are not required to protect them, but usually either avoid altering them, or otherwise place them as close to where they originally were as possible once construction has been completed as a courtesy.

In California, Streets and Highways Code Section 101.10 directs the California Department of Transportation (Caltrans) to place and maintain memorial signs along state highways that read "Please Don't Drink and Drive" followed by "In Memory of {victim's name}." Caltrans places signs at the request of victims' relatives when there is a fatality as a result of an alcohol or drug-impaired driver. The signs are to remain in place for a period of seven years. The department shall charge the requesting party a fee to cover the department's cost in designing, constructing, placing, and maintaining that sign, and the department's costs in administering this section.

South Dakotan THINK Signs are used for a similar purpose in the state of South Dakota. These signs mark the site of a fatal road accident anywhere in the state. Approximately half of all signs are in place due to drunk driving. The signs read either "THINK!" or "WHY DIE?" and feature a prominent red X and a black and white backdrop.

In Colorado, the Department of Transportation issues temporary memorials for a minimum of two years, if the family or an agent representing the family request a memorial within 5 years following the accident. The signs can feature various messages based on the circumstances of the accident.

The states of Massachusetts, Kentucky, and Wisconsin ban such memorials.

In the state of Delaware, roadside memorials are illegal per the Clear Zone Act for safety reasons. As an alternative to roadside memorials, the Delaware Highway Memorial Garden located at the Smyrna Rest Area consists of a path with bricks bearing the names of people who died along roads in Delaware. Other states impose specific requirements for roadside memorials.

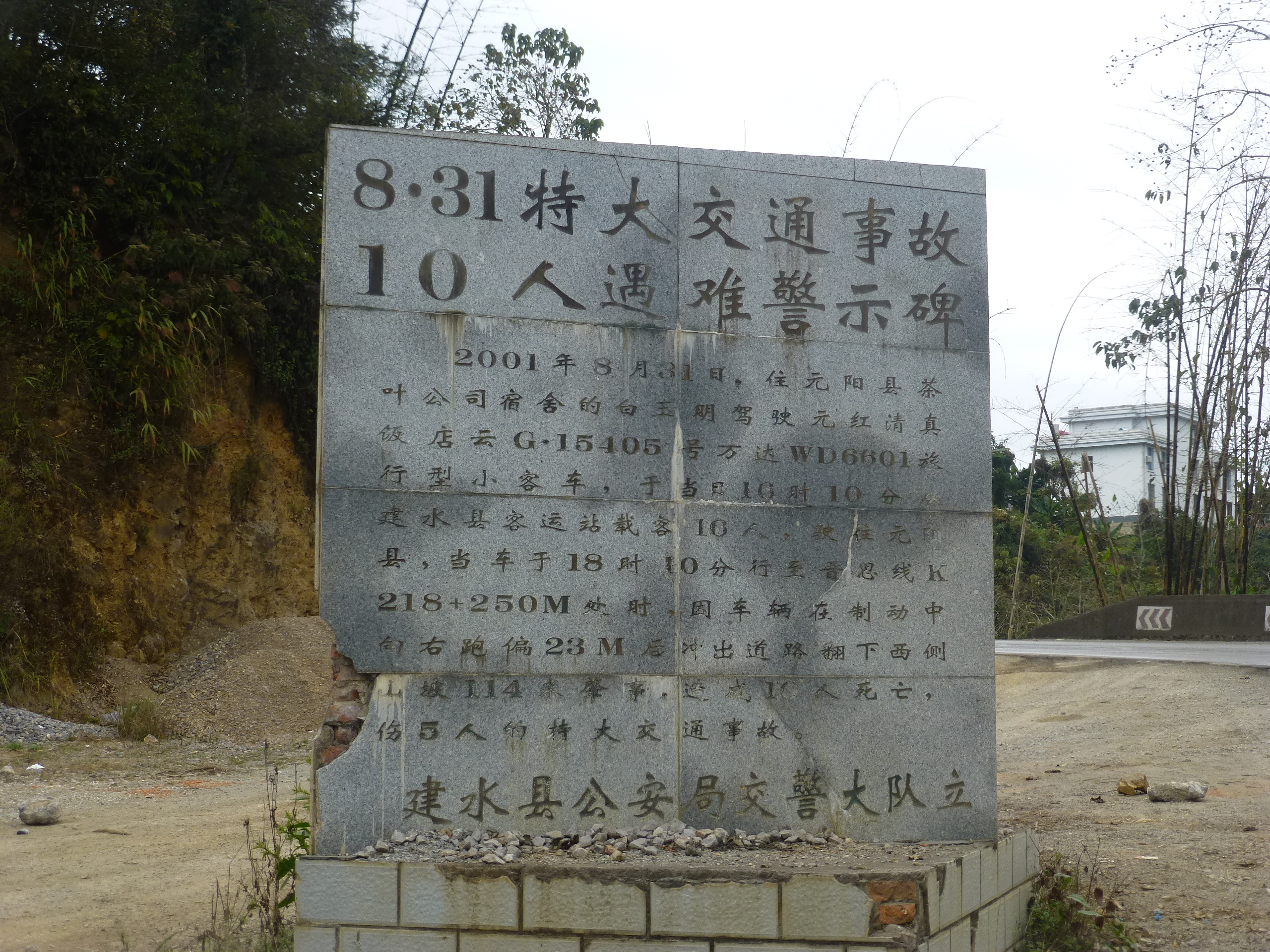
A small memorial erected by the Jianshui County Police Department in memory of 10 people who perished in a bus plunge off Yunnan Provincial Highway 214, as it descends toward the Red River Fault in a series of switchbacks

Using a Christian cross as a memorial along a public highway can be seen as an illegal endorsement of religion and has been challenged in a growing number of lawsuits by secular groups concerned about the separation of church and state. On 18 August 2010 the Tenth Circuit held that the State of Utah violated the Establishment Clause of the Constitution by constructing a series of 12-foot high Latin crosses along the roadside to memorialize fallen state troopers. In Lake Elsinore California, a personal roadside cross was removed following a complaint by the American Humanist Association.

In the state of Virginia, family-made temporary memorials of whatever shape and construction may be replaced by a state-issue memorial roadsign saying "DRIVE SAFELY IN MEMORY OF" with a name plate; such signs avoid the state-religious-endorsement controversy by only using a generic circle as an emblem.

== See also ==
- Parting stone
