= Abandoned footwear =

Shoes lost or discarded in public

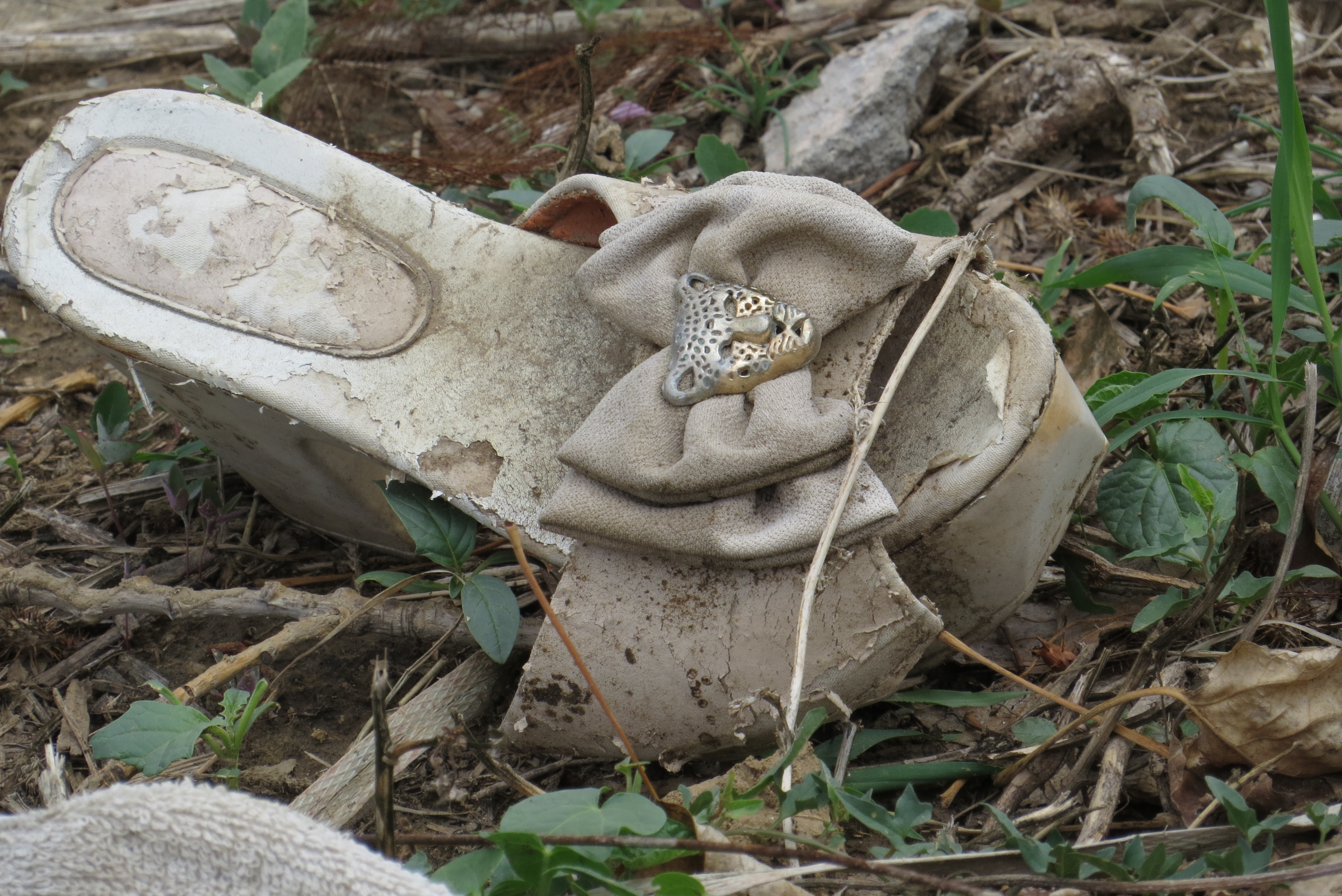
An abandoned high-heeled sandal near Beijing Capital International Airport

Abandoned footwear is regularly found intentionally placed or littered in inhabited areas. There are many hypotheses about why footwear are found more than other types of clothing or why footwear is noticed more than other types of clothing. Shoes are more sturdily constructed than most other types of clothing so they will last longer after being abandoned outdoors. Leather shoes, for instance, are estimated to last for 25–40 years outside. Some shoe abandonment is intentional, as in shoe tossing, in which shoes are tied together by their laces and thrown into trees, over power lines, or over fences. Other intentional shoe abandonment is for the purposes of a memorial, as in the case of ghost shoes.

== Artistic use ==
Abandoned footwear is a feature in a number of artistic works:

- Some artists derive insight and inspiration from abandoned footwear – a form of art known as objet trouvé.
- The lost slipper in the Cinderella folktale is a classic example of the literary device of the "lost object".
- A fisherman hauling up an old boot, rather than a fish, is a comic-strip cliché.
- The theme of abandoned footwear and their untold story is explored in detail in Julie Ann Shapiro's novel, Jen-Zen and the One Shoe Diaries. The titular character describes the phenomenon, “The forgotten shoes are everywhere: littering the side of the highway, floating in the tide, going upstream with the salmon, or occupying a field like a dead body, discarded and left to rot.”
- Van Gogh made multiple paintings of abandoned shoes and boots.

== As a memorial ==
After the Auschwitz concentration camp was liberated in 1945, large piles of "abandoned" shoes were found which in turn became a symbol of the loss and death. Shoes on the Danube Bank uses abandoned shoes to show the absence of the people shot into the river. It has also been used for indigenous children in Canada and children in Gaza.

== In sport ==
Leaving behind shoes or "hanging up the cleats" can be a symbol of retirement in sport. For example, as ESPN's Sherry Skalko describes about Rulon Gardner's last wrestling bout in Athens, Greece:

An emotional Rulon Gardner prepares to leave his shoes on the mat – a symbol of retirement.

After the referee raised Gardner's hand in victory – first to one side of the arena, then to the other – Gardner grabbed an American flag, wiped away tears and parked himself in the middle of Mat B like "a 33-year-old kid" and took off his size 13 shoes. First the right one, the one that contains the constant reminder of the snowmobiling accident that almost took his life two years ago, then the left.

Then the super heavyweight bronze medalist stood up, bowed his head at each side of the mat and walked off, leaving his shoes behind, a wrestler's signal that he had fought his final bout.

== As waste ==
Abandoned and discarded footwear are a major source of waste, especially with increased consumption and disposal as a result of fast fashion trends. Footwear is generally not biodegradable and as they are typically made of many different materials, they are hard to recycle. As a consequence, they are often disposed of by incineration.

== See also ==
- Shoe throwing – Various acts of throwing shoes at targets, people or raised wires
- Ghost shoes – Memorial to pedestrian traffic fatality
- Salish Sea human foot discoveries – Detached human feet found on the Canadian coast
