= Ghost shoes =

Memorial to pedestrian traffic fatality

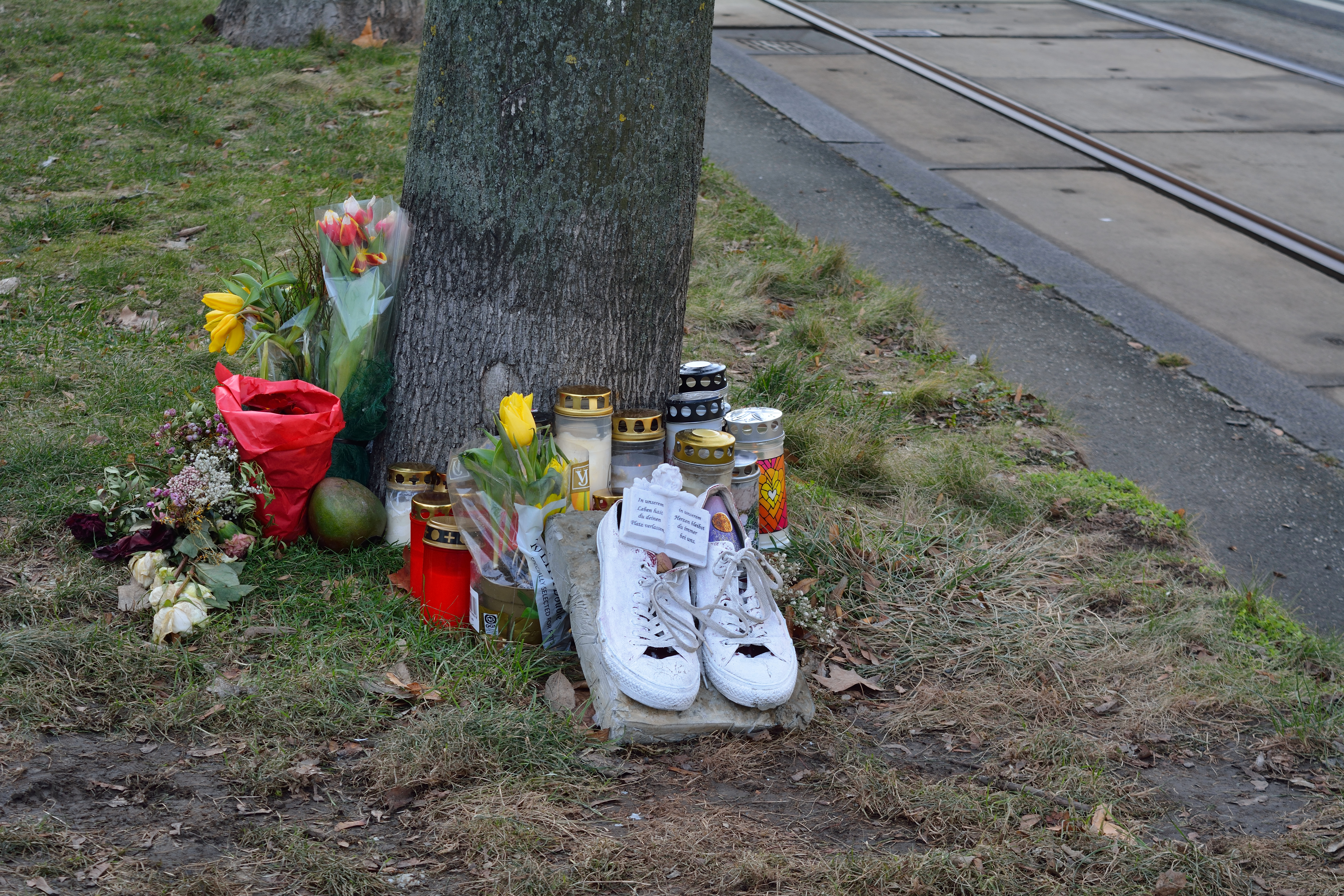
Ghost shoes in Vienna, Austria

Ghost shoes are a form of roadside memorial meant to commemorate a location where a pedestrian was killed in a traffic collision. They consist of a pair or multiple pairs of white shoes, often on a lamppost or telephone pole, and may also include flowers, and often include signs with the identity of the victim.

Ghost shoes first appeared in Montreal in 2016. Since then, several such memorials, some in groups, have been erected across the United States and Canada. Though there is no centralized organization overseeing either, ghost shoes are similar to ghost bikes, a form of memorial to cyclists killed in traffic collisions.

== Notable incidents ==
- 26 January 2016, Montreal, Canada – On 7 January 2016, Concepción Cortacans was struck while crossing an intersection by a SUV that ran a red light. Cortacans died of her injuries six days later. On 26 January 2016, a group of Cortacans' friends and family as well as traffic safety activists gathered at the location of the collision and hung a pair of white shoes from a lamppost. Montreal had a previous precedent of ghost bikes, but the memorial for Cortacans was the first recorded instance of the phenomenon being adapted for foot traffic fatalities.
- October 2017, Milwaukee, Wisconsin – In September 2017, a Wisconsin state program for pedestrian and cyclist safety advocacy called Share & Be Aware declared the upcoming October as an event called Walktober, in which demonstrations would be held and a pair of ghost shoes would be erected for each of the 17 pedestrians killed in Milwaukee in the year prior. The event in Milwaukee was the first instance of ghost shoes in the USA.
- 12 January 2020, Montgomery County, Maryland – On 12 January 2020, members of The Action Committee for Transit held a rally and erected a pair of ghost shoes on a telephone pole in memory of Rita Jo Sultan, an elderly woman who was killed in Silver Spring, Maryland, in December 2019. The memorial was held only days after Montgomery County's first pedestrian death of 2020, when Jose Renan Guillen, 75, was killed on 6 January 2020.
- 2 March 2020, Brooklyn, New York City – On 2 March 2020, a group of transportation activists lined up 22 pairs of white shoes in front of the YMCA branch frequented by New York City mayor Bill de Blasio, intended to represent the 23 pedestrians killed in New York City since 1 January 2020. The 23rd fatality occurred on the date of the demonstration, and a corresponding pair of shoes was not obtained in time.
- 15 November 2020, Toronto, Canada – A memorial including 35 ghost shoes was scheduled to be erected in Nathan Phillips Square for World Day of Remembrance for Road Traffic Victims. However, strong winds forced Jessica Spieker, the organizer of the memorial, to move the display indoors into her house.
- 23 May 2021, Montgomery County, Maryland – Two pairs of ghost shoes were hung on a telephone pole in Aspen Hill, Maryland, to commemorate Claire Grossman, who was killed in April 2021 while attempting to cross Georgia Avenue, and her late husband, Robert Grossman, who was also killed in a pedestrian death on the same stretch of Georgia Avenue years prior. Ghost shoes were also erected for Etsegenet Hurissa, who was killed on Georgia Avenue in 2011, and Victor Ramos, who was killed on Georgia Avenue in 2009.
- 29 January 2022, Nashville, Tennessee – On 29 January 2022, 37 pairs of ghost shoes and one ghost bike were erected in a memorial for the 38 pedestrian fatalities in Nashville in 2021. The memorial was erected on the median strip of Murfreesboro Pike, a road notorious for pedestrian fatalities in Nashville.
- May 2022, Jersey City, New Jersey – In May 2022, a pair of ghost shoes were hung to commemorate the death of Philip Delancy, who was killed near New Jersey Route 440 on 3 November 2021.
- 26 October 2022, Hartford, Connecticut – A local activist group called the Connecticut Urbanists hung a pair of ghost shoes at an intersection in West Hartford where Bob O'Neal, 61, was killed by a car on 3 June 2022.

== See also ==
- Shoes on powerlines
- Road traffic safety
- Abandoned footwear
