= Ride of Silence =

Annual bicycle ride in the US

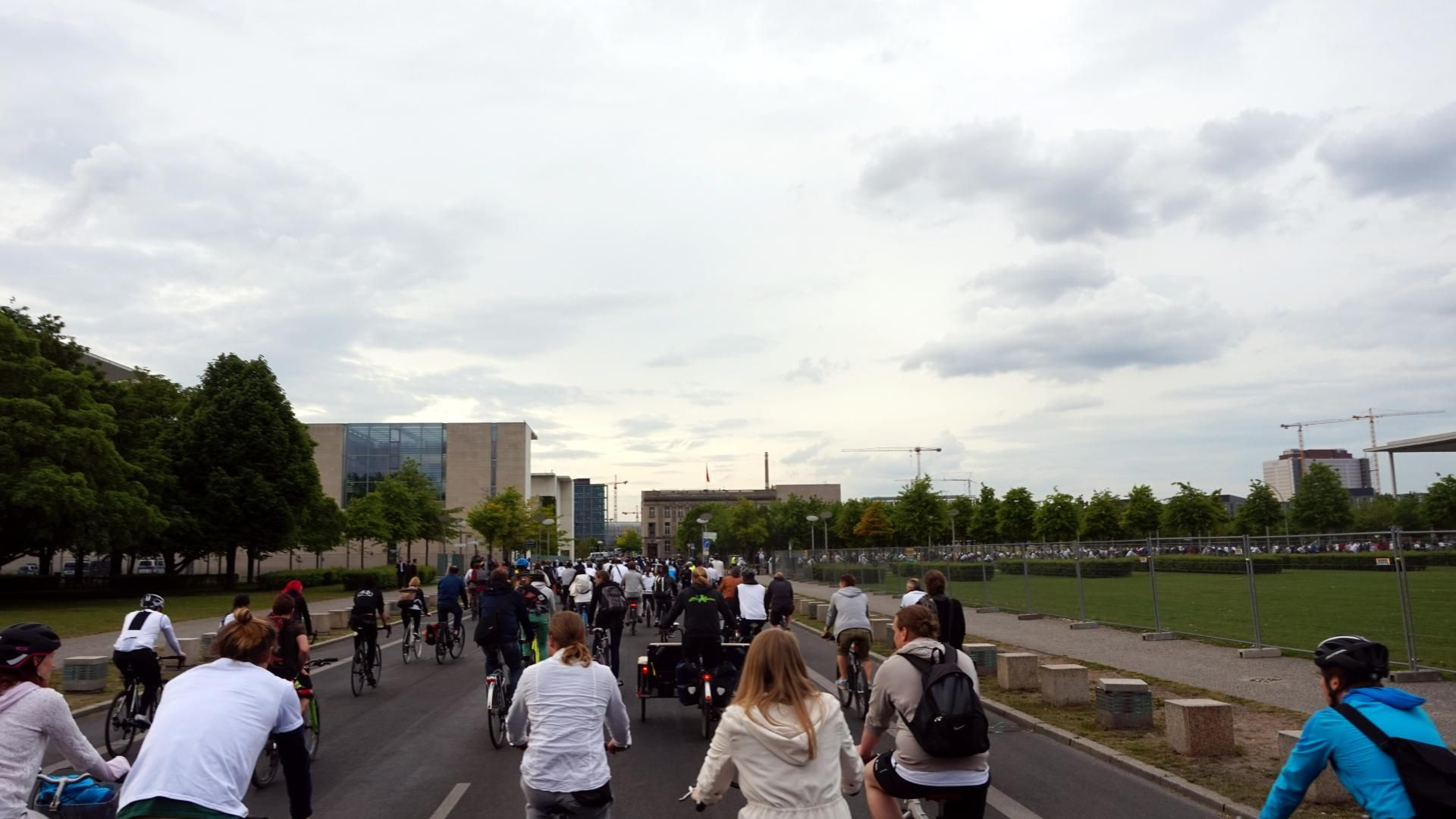
Ride of Silence, Berlin, 2015, as the cyclists pass the German Chancellery and Reichstag

The Ride of Silence is an annual multi-location, international bicycle ride to commemorate cyclists killed and support those injured while riding on public roads. It helps to raise awareness among motorists, the public and decision makers of the dangers cyclists face on the roads, especially from other traffic.

The first Ride of Silence was organized by Chris Phelan and held in Dallas, Texas, in 2003. Many participants found the experience to be very moving. Although it was conceived as a one-time event, it has been repeated every year since then. Cyclists in cities around the globe have joined this movement. It has grown each year, with around 400 locations participating, most in the United States, but typically on all seven continents, including Antarctica. In 2013, the tenth anniversary, Ride of Silence events were held in 26 countries.

The Ride of Silence is held on the evening of the third Wednesday in May. In the United States, the League of American Bicyclists promotes this event side by side with national Bike Month and Bike-to-Work Day, held on the third Friday in May.

== See also ==
- Ghost bike
- Critical Mass (cycling)
