= Wedding superstitions =

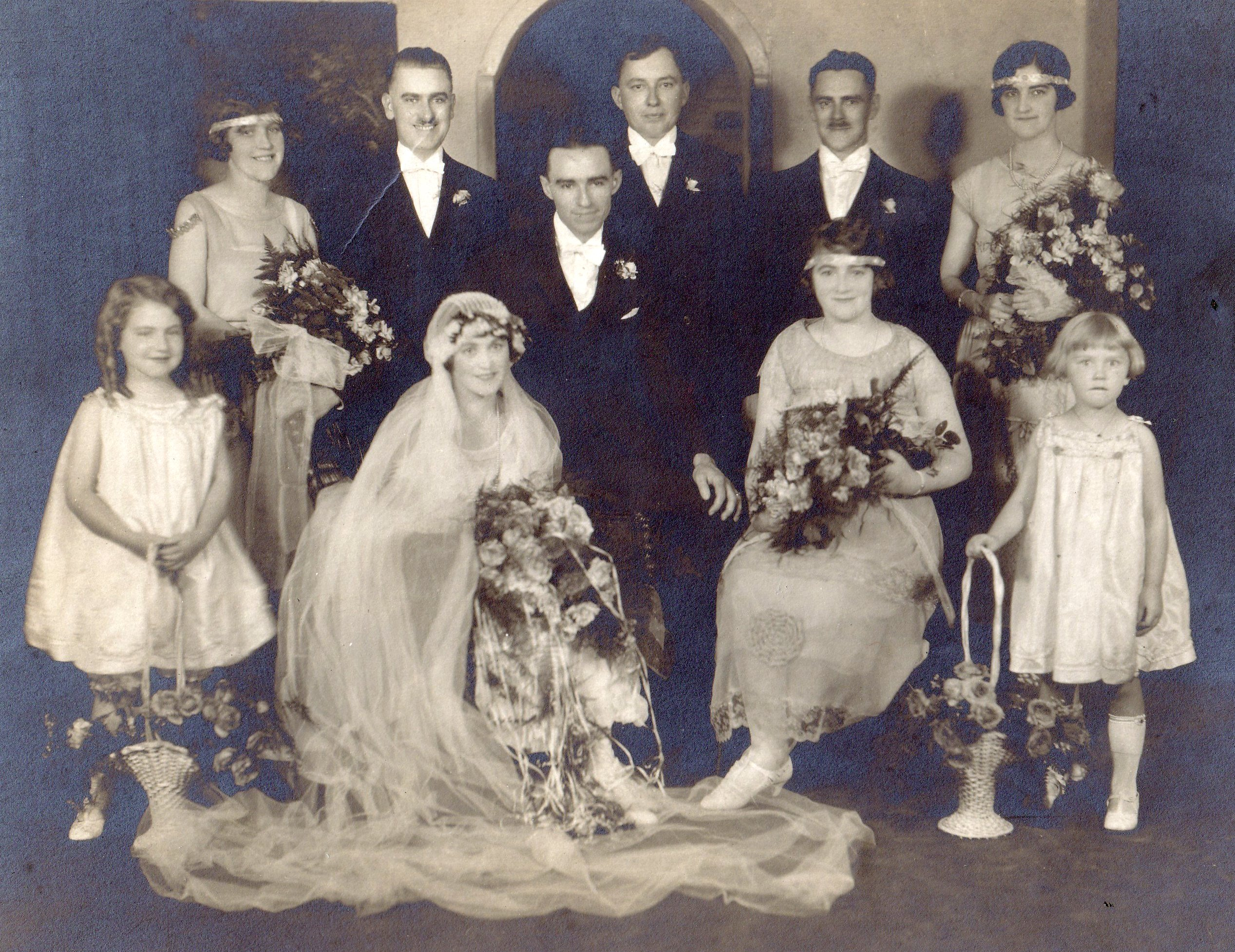
A wedding in Chicago, 1925.

A wedding is a celebratory ceremony where two people are brought together in matrimony. Wedding traditions and customs differ across cultures, countries, religions, and societies in terms of how a marriage should be celebrated, but are strongly symbolic, and often have roots in superstitions for what makes a lucky or unlucky marriage. Superstition is often linked to practices involving luck, fate or prophecy, and while many weddings are now more focused on celebratory traditions, many are still practiced, and numerous well-known wedding traditions have roots in superstitions from previous ages. A common example of a superstition involves no one seeing the bride in her wedding dress until the ceremony.

== By country/religion ==
=== Asian wedding superstitions ===
==== China ====
- In some provinces, the perfect wedding date is important for a successful marriage, and can be determined by slaughtering a chicken.

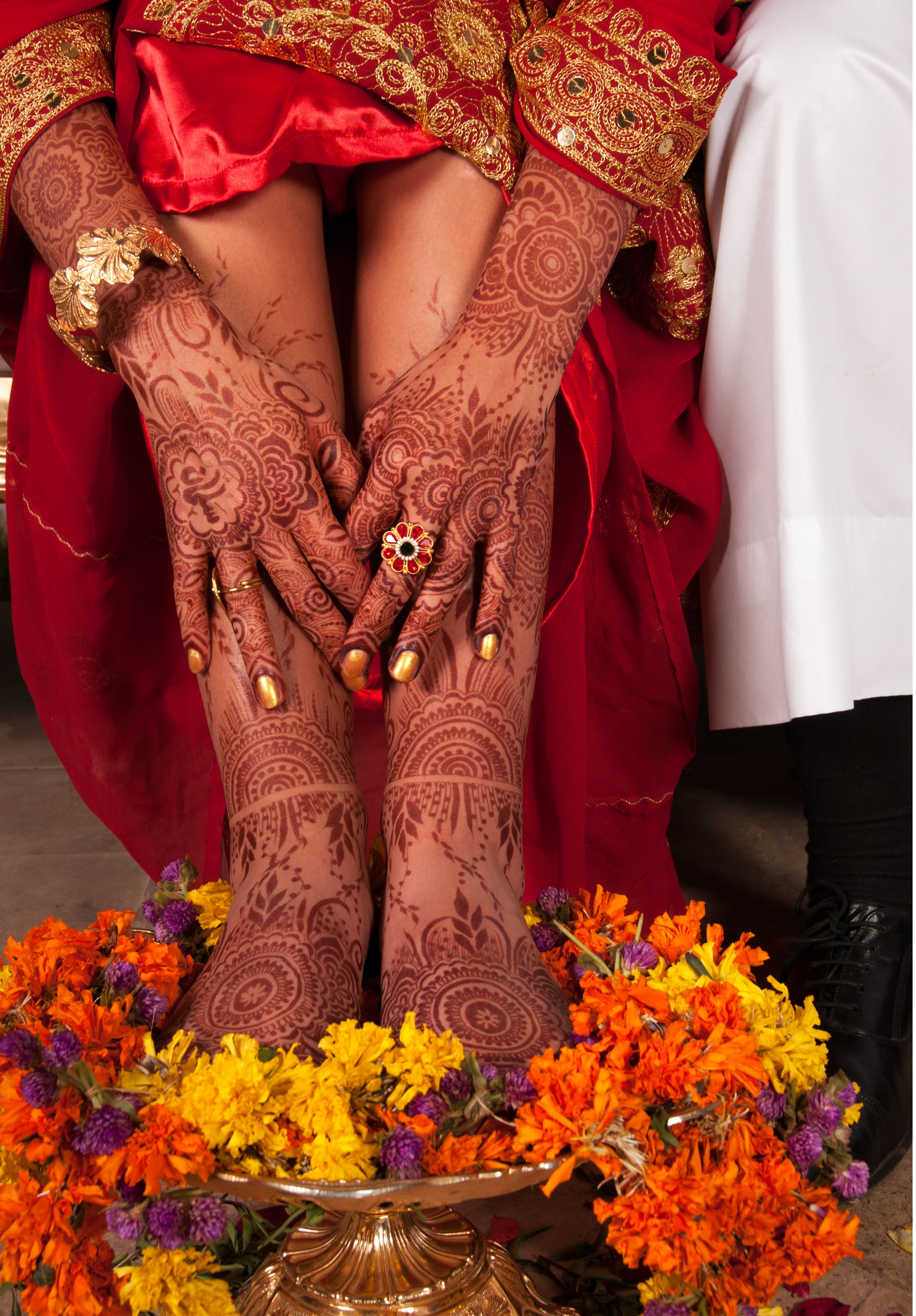
A bride with traditional henna on her hands and feet for her wedding day.

==== India ====
- Rain on one's wedding day is thought to bring wealth and fertility to the marriage.
- A superstitious wedding practice from northern India involves tying gold and red kaleerein (ornaments) from the bride's choora, before the bride moves her hands above the heads of the unmarried women. The superstition infers that the girl upon whose head the kaleerein fall will be the next to marry.
- If the wedding ceremony incorporates candles and these candles sputter, it can be considered a bad omen, as it suggests there are evil spirits lurking.

=== European wedding superstitions ===
==== England ====
===== Something old, something new, something borrowed, something blue =====
A bride's something borrowed, something blue, something old, and something new, as the superstition goes.

“Something old, something new” refers to the traditional rhyme originating in Victorian-era England stating that, for good luck and a happy marriage, a bride must have on her wedding day:

"Something old, something new / Something borrowed, something blue / And a sixpence in her shoe."

'Something old' symbolises the bride-to-be's past, her family and her values, and could be a piece of jewelry or a similar token. A bride's 'something new' might be a gift from the groom or her family, and represents a new chapter in the brides life full of good fortune and happiness. 'Something borrowed' might be a bridal accessory lent by a friend or family member who themselves is happily married, to ensure the bride's marriage is just as happy as theirs. 'Something blue' represents purity, faithfulness and modesty, projecting these values into the future marriage, and could come in the form of a blue ribbon or brooch. Lastly, a sixpence in the bride's shoe – or even sewn into her dress – promises lasting wealth for the couple.

===== Seeing the bride before the wedding =====
A very common wedding superstition to this day is that the groom mustn't see the bride before the wedding. This emerged from a time when arranged marriages were commonplace, and was practiced to ensure the groom would go through with the marriage regardless of the bride-to-be's identity or appearance. Although arranged marriages are no longer as common, most brides still prefer to keep their bridal-look a secret from the groom until the ceremony.

===== Good luck =====
According to English folklore:

- Wednesday is the luckiest day to marry and Saturday is the unluckiest. An auspicious rhyme from English folklore rules: "Monday for health, Tuesday for wealth, Wednesday best of all, Thursday for losses, Friday for crosses, Saturday for no luck at all."
- Sprinkling the bride with wheat or rice brings fruitfulness.
- Ensure a good future by throwing coins over the heads of the bride and groom.
- If a cat sneezes on the eve of the wedding, it's a sign of good luck.
- A groom should rub elbows with his groomsman for good luck.
- One can save crumbs from the wedding cake to ensure marriage in the future.
- It is good luck to throw shoes overhead the newly-weds.
- The fourth finger of the left hand is the ring-finger as it was believed an artery ran from it to the heart, ensuring love. Additionally, a pre-18th century England belief that the fourth finger was "the medicine finger", and from this arose a superstition that wedding rings have curative properties.
- Finding a spider on the wedding dress is said to be good luck, according to English folklore.

According to issue 1101 of the London Journal from 1905, wreaths, although lucky (see Italy), are "unbecoming", so orange blossoms should be substituted because, due to their association with the Crusaders returning from the Holy Land, they bring good luck and prosperity.

===== Bad luck =====
- Marrying in a church near an uncovered, open grave leads to bad luck.
- Marrying in green is bad luck.
- It is bad luck for the bride to look at herself in the mirror after she's dressed in her bridal wear, but can be counteracted by the addition of another accessory after this.
- Marrying someone whose surname begins with the same letter is thought to bring bad luck: "to change the name and not the letter / is to change for the worse and not the better."
- If you are a bridesmaid who stumbles walking to the altar, you will never be wed.
- A sapphire in a wedding ring will bring happiness to the marriage, while pearls, due to their tear-drop-like shape, will bring misfortune.
- According to an old wives' tale, if the younger of two sisters marries before the older, the older sister must dance barefoot at the wedding or she will never marry.
- Giving a couple a knife or a set of knives for their wedding gift is bad luck, as it signifies a broken relationship.
- According to an excerpt from issue 295 of Notes and Queries entitled 'Wedding Superstitions', if one walks from the Church with a man, they will never be wed: "as they have walked back from church together before they are married, they will never walk back from church together as man and wife."

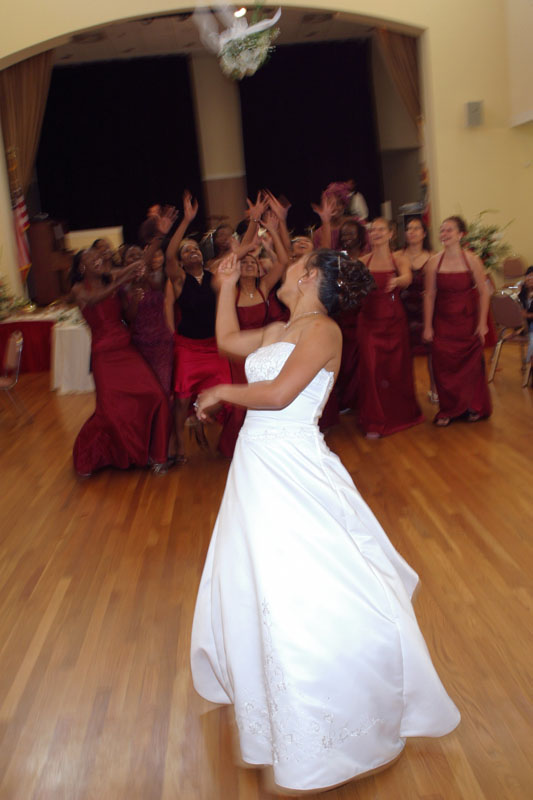
A bride tossing her bouquet into a crowd as per the superstition.

==== France ====
- The traditional wedding cake originated in France, but cake at weddings was common throughout Europe: in the Middle Ages, guests would bring and stack their cakes up, and a French wedding superstition suggests that if the bride and groom can kiss over the top of the cake(s) without them toppling, they will enjoy a lifetime of happiness together.

===== Catching the bouquet or garter =====
The well-known superstition that the person who catches the bouquet or garter thrown by the bride will be the next to marry is still a common ritual at weddings. The superstition dictates that the unmarried woman who catches the bouquet will be the next to get married. The garter toss is said to have originated in France, but has roots in medieval superstitions.

This originated in medieval Europe, based on the superstition that it was good luck to get a piece of the bride's wedding dress. Guests would thus gather after the ceremony and try to rip parts of the dress, sometimes seeing it torn apart. The tossing of the bouquet originated to distract the guests while the bride and groom made their getaway to their marriage chamber, upon which the groom would throw the bride's garter into the crowd of guests outside.

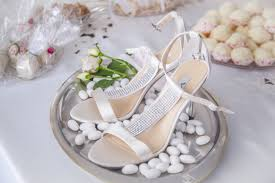
Sugar-coated almonds incorporated in a wedding photo shoot.

==== Greece ====
- A sugar cube upon the bride on her wedding day promises a sweet marriage.
- According to a Greek Orthodox bride speaking to Manhattan Bride Magazine, a popular superstition in Greece involves sugar-covered almonds, or koufeta, where the bride and groom hand them out to their guests in order to bring good luck to the marriage in four ways: the white of the sugar brings purity, the ovular shape represents fertility and promises babies, the hardness bring resilience to the marriage, and finally the sugar promises a sweet union.

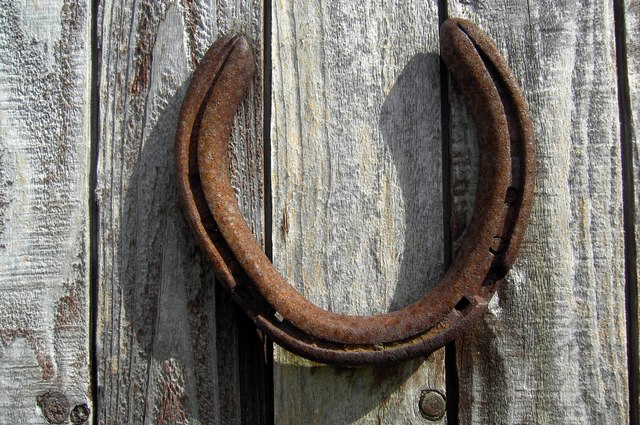
An upward-facing horseshoe is considered to bring good luck.

==== Ireland ====
- A traditional Irish superstition sees bells rung at weddings in order to keep evil spirits away and bring a happy, lucky marriage. Some brides will adorn their bouquets with bells or use them in their table centrepieces to follow the superstitious tradition.

==== Italy ====
- Like in several other countries and cultures, rain on the wedding day is considered a good luck omen.
- In Italy, newlyweds might smash glass at their wedding, as there is a superstition that however many pieces the glass breaks into signifies how many years the couple will be happily married.

Many wedding superstitions still engaged in today have origins in ancient Rome. For example:

- Juno is the ancient Roman goddess of marriage and childbirth, thus marrying in June is considered lucky.
- Garlands and wreaths were worn to protect from evil spirits, as it was thought they could not harm anyone that were inside a circle
- "Marry in the month of May, and you'll surely rue the day" is a superstitious rhyme discouraging brides to marry in May and have an unlucky marriage.

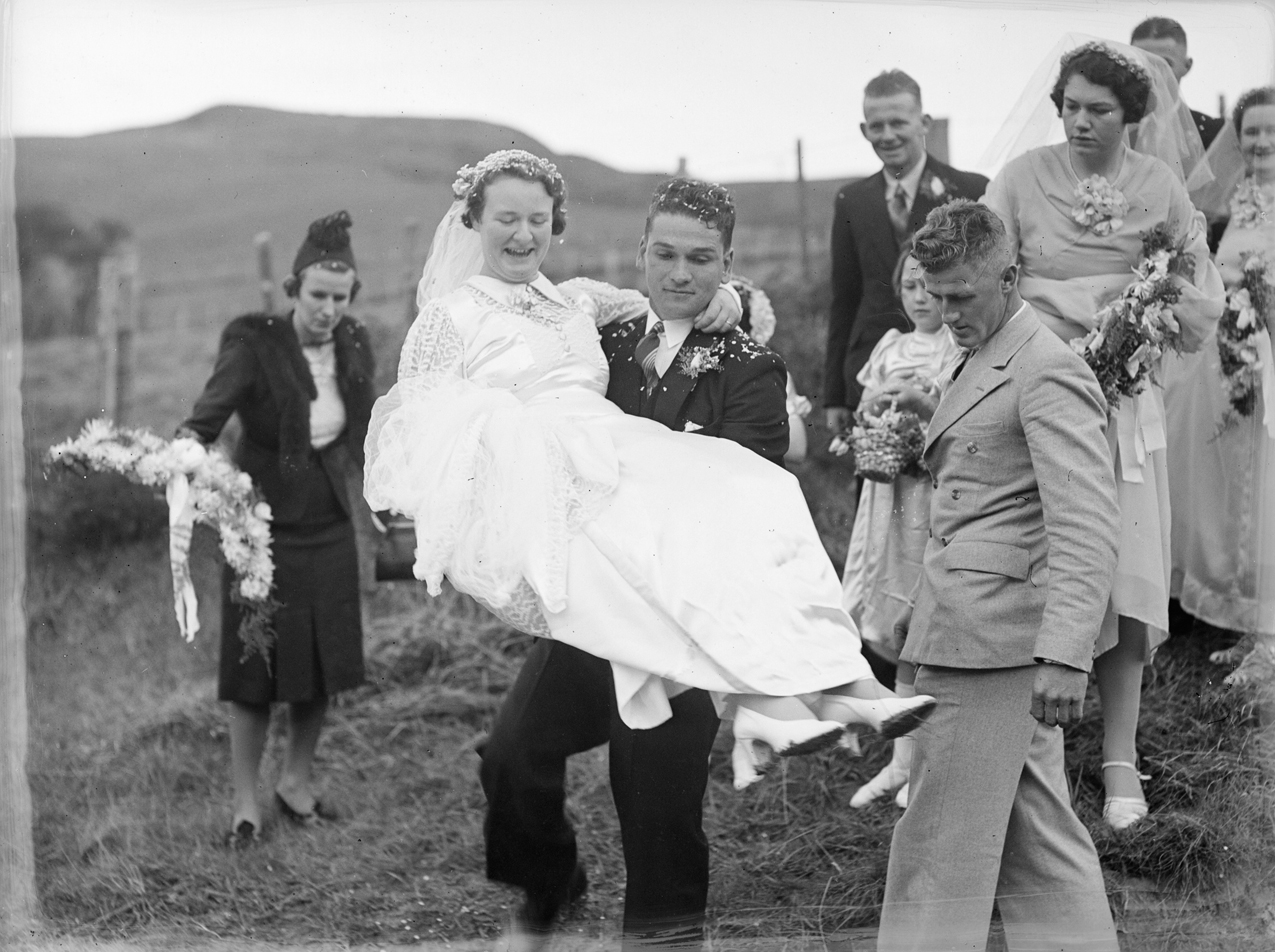
A groom carrying his bride.

Some superstitions, on the other hand, hold much less relevance in contemporary wedding customs. For example, ancient Romans studied pig intestines to predict the luckiest time to marry. However, below are examples of superstitions that originated in ancient Rome, but transcended the ancient era and continued as wedding superstitions in medieval Europe and the 18th and 19th centuries.

===== Carrying the bride over the threshold =====
This tradition originates from an ancient Roman superstition upheld in medieval Europe warning that evil spirits might curse a bride through the soles of her feet, so the groom must carry her to and through the doors of their new home to protect her, and their marriage, from misfortune.

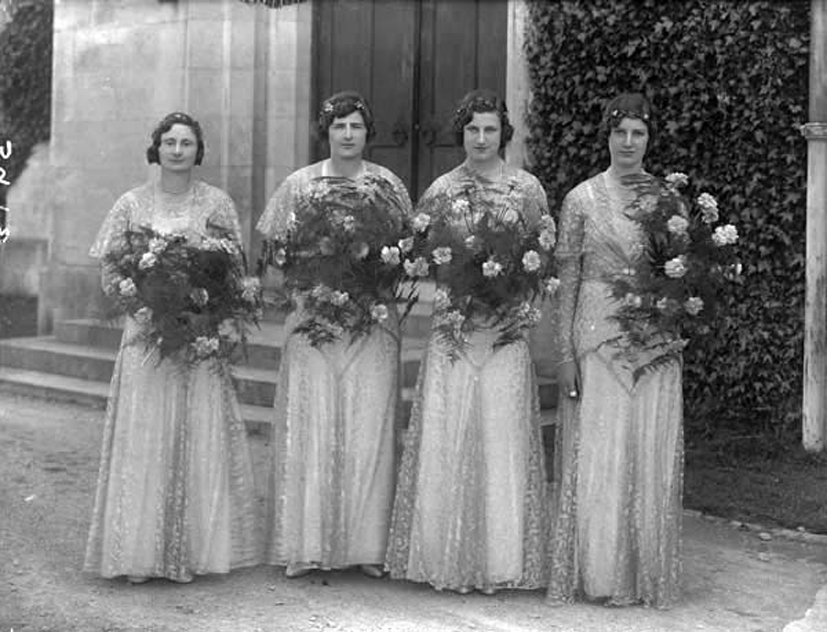
Bridesmaids holding bouquets in August, 1933.

===== Bridesmaids =====
Bridesmaids are commonplace in many weddings across the world, but while they are included as friends and family members for support, they were once there for superstitious reasons that date back to ancient Rome: Bridesmaids – wearing dresses and veils – were used as a line of defense to trick evil spirits and envious suitors as to protect the bride.

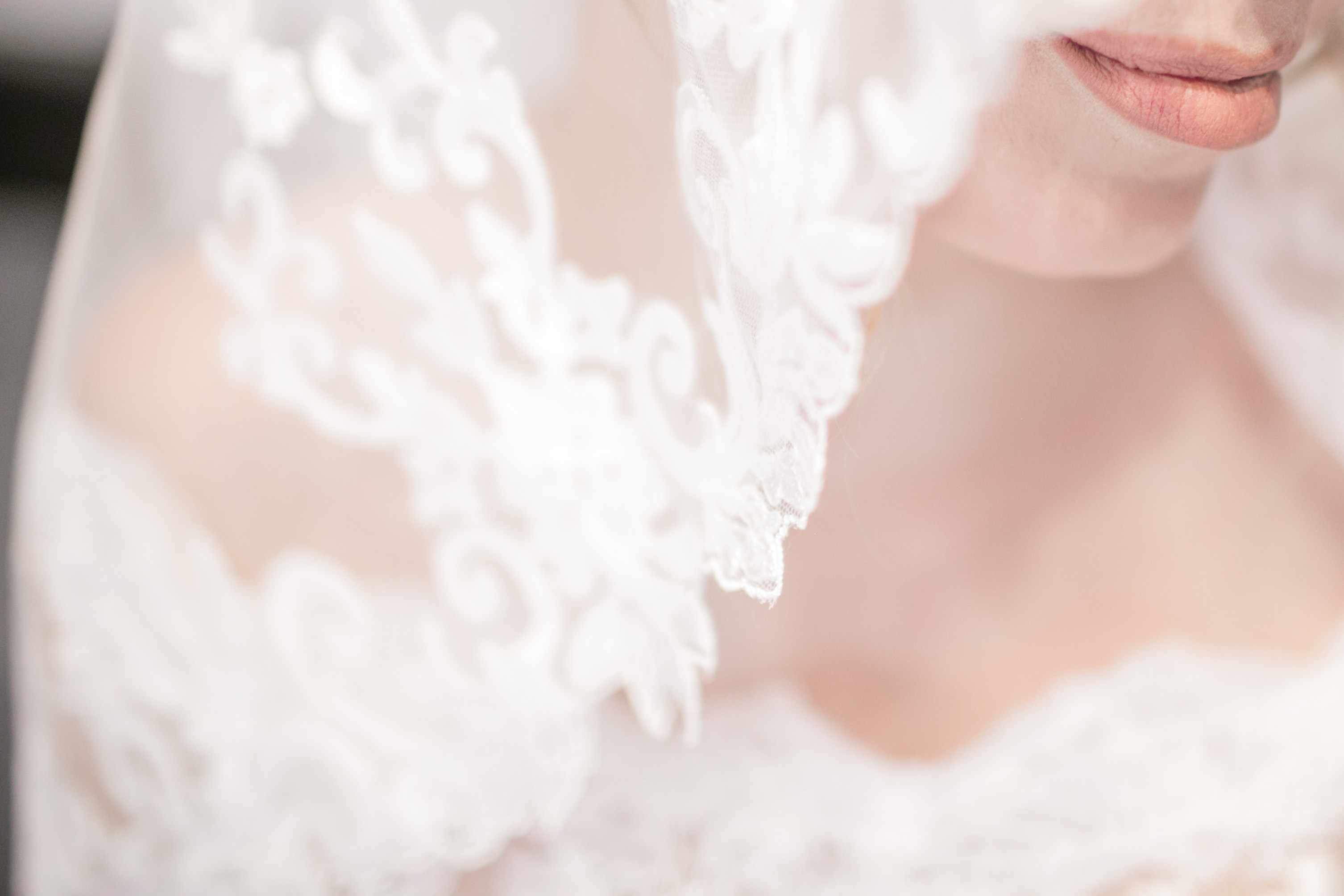
A wedding veil.

===== The wedding veil =====
The wedding veil is a staple item in most western wedding bridal wear, and is based on the superstition that a bride's face should be covered before she reaches the altar, in order to protect her and her future marriage from evil spirits. This superstition originated in ancient Greece and Rome, and the veil was often flame-coloured for extra protection.

==== Poland ====
- A Polish superstition suggests that brides be mindful of their bridal footwear: it warns that open-toed shoes will cause all their future wealth and prosperity to fly out. They can, however, make back this wealth when guests shower them with coins upon leaving the ceremony, which they must collect to ensure wealth in their marriage.

==== Sweden ====
- A Swedish bride might put a silver coin from her father in one shoe and a gold coin from her mother in the other to ensure she never has to do without.

=== African wedding superstitions ===
==== Egypt ====
- In Egypt, women pinch the bride before her wedding to bring her good luck.

=== North American wedding superstitions ===
==== Mexico ====
- As per a Mexican wedding superstition, brides in Mexico might sew colored ribbons into their dresses: yellow to bring the blessing of food, blue to bring wealth and prosperity and red to allow a passionate marriage.

==== Nicaragua ====
- Some Nicaraguan brides believe that pearls are "tears of the sea", and wearing them on the wedding day will bring sadness to the marriage. This superstition is common in Latin culture.

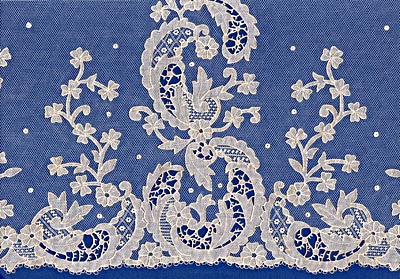
An example of carrickmacross lace, a form of lace that the Duchess of Cambridge incorporated into her wedding dress.
