= Ghost bike =

Memorial to cyclist

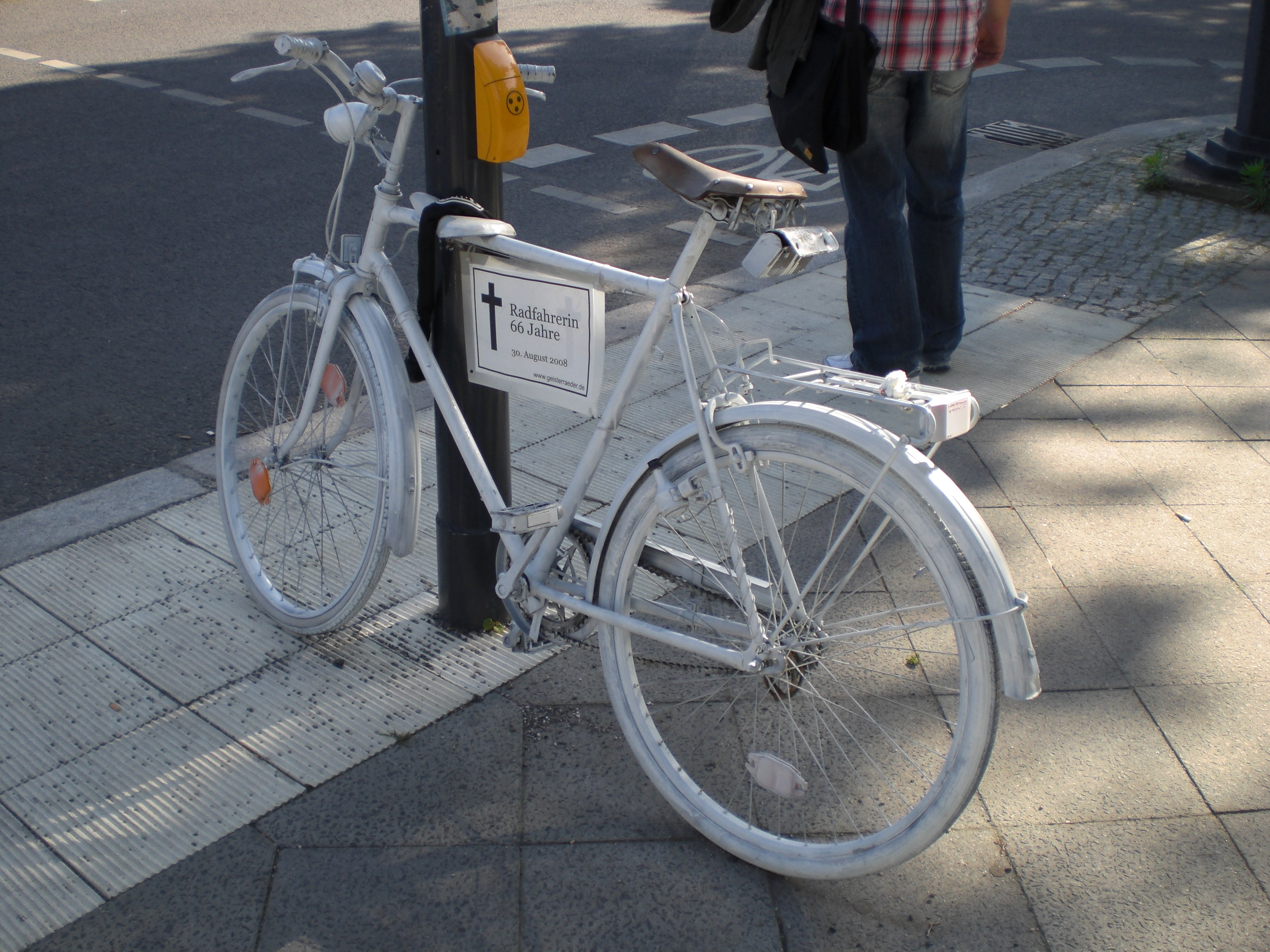
Ghost bike in Berlin, commemorating a cyclist killed in August 2008

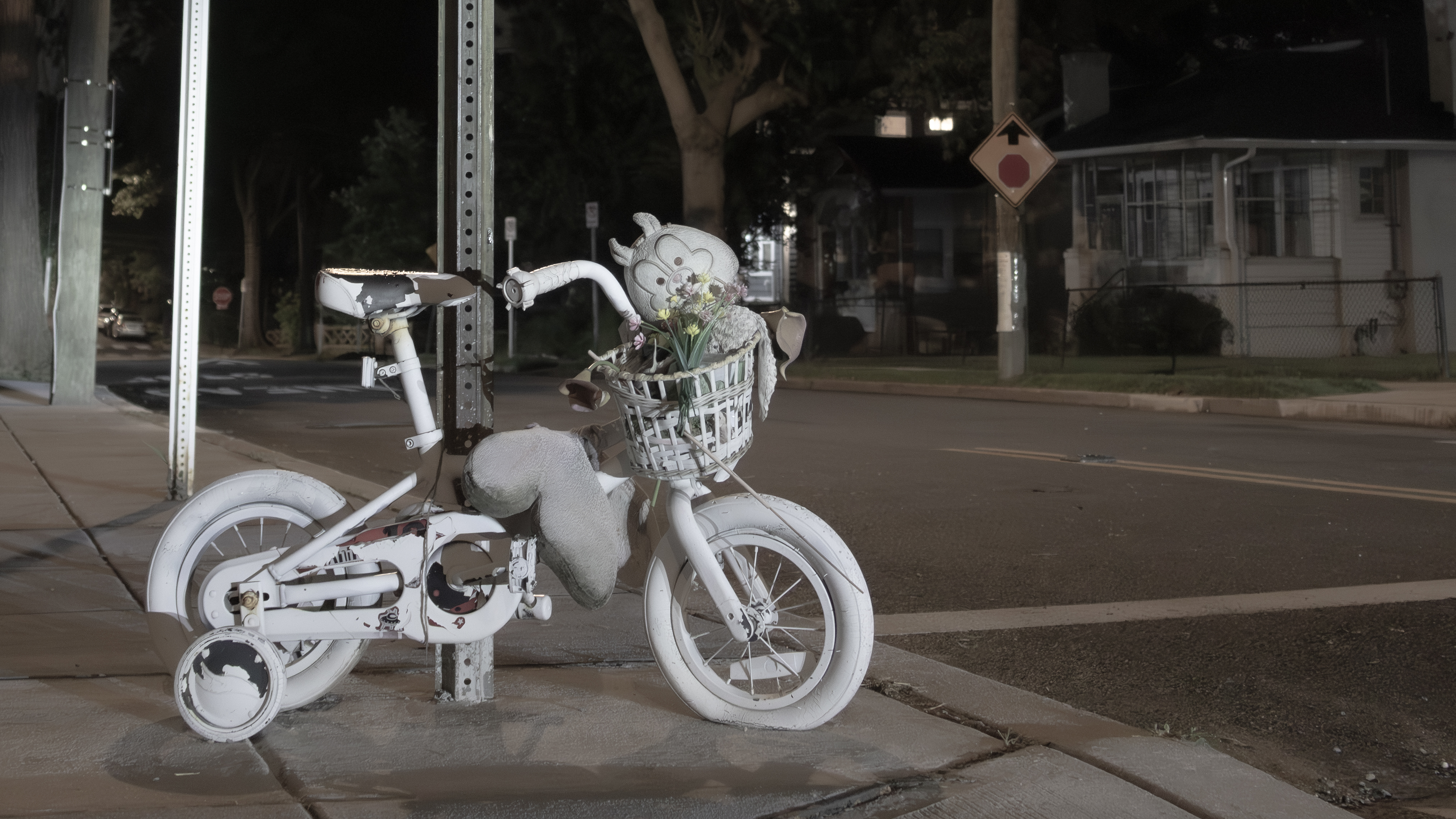
A child ghost bike in Washington DC, commemorating a child cyclist killed September 2021

A ghost bike is a bicycle roadside memorial, placed where a cyclist has been killed or severely injured, usually by the driver of a motor vehicle. Ghost bikes are painted entirely white and are commonly decorated with signs, flowers, or personal mementos left by the victim's family; parts are often removed to deter theft. They are created by local cyclists and volunteers to honor those who have died, and have appeared in cities around the world.

Ghost bikes are usually installed after dark, often in a solemn ceremony by fellow cyclists. The installation typically does not proceed until the victim's family has given approval, out of respect for them and the person who died.

People who create ghost bikes may also view the memorials as art.

== History ==
=== Earlier white bicycle projects ===
The idea of painting bikes white originated in Amsterdam in the 1960s as part of an anarchist project and tactical urbanism initiative called the White Bicycle Plan to liberate two-wheel transport. White bikes were free for anyone to use, and then to leave for others.

The ghost bike idea in the United States may have originated with a project by San Francisco artist Jo Slota, begun in April 2002. This was a purely artistic endeavor. Slota was intrigued by the abandoned bicycles that he found around the city, locked up but stripped of useful parts. He began painting them white, and posted photographs on his website, ghostbike.net.

=== Memorial bikes ===
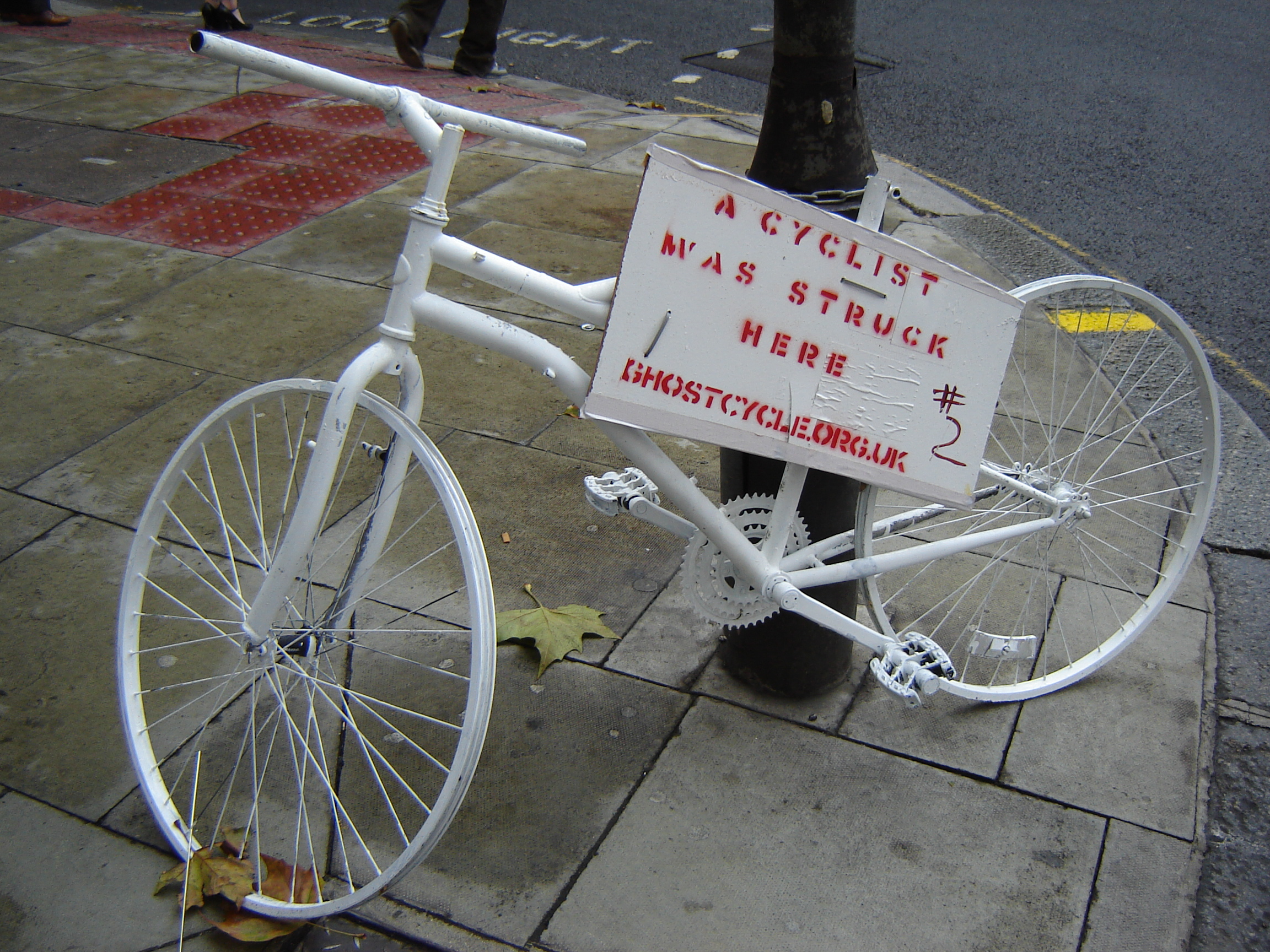
Ghost bike in Gray's Inn Road, London

A ghost bike memorial project was started in St. Louis, Missouri, in October 2003. After observing a motorist strike a bicyclist in a bike lane on Holly Hills Boulevard, Patrick Van Der Tuin placed a white-painted bicycle on the spot with a hand-painted sign reading "Cyclist Struck Here". Noticing the effect that this had on motorists in the area, Van Der Tuin then enlisted the help of friends to place 15 more "ghost bikes" in prominent spots in the St. Louis area where cyclists had recently been hit by automobiles. They used damaged bikes, in some cases deliberately damaged to create the desired mangled effect.

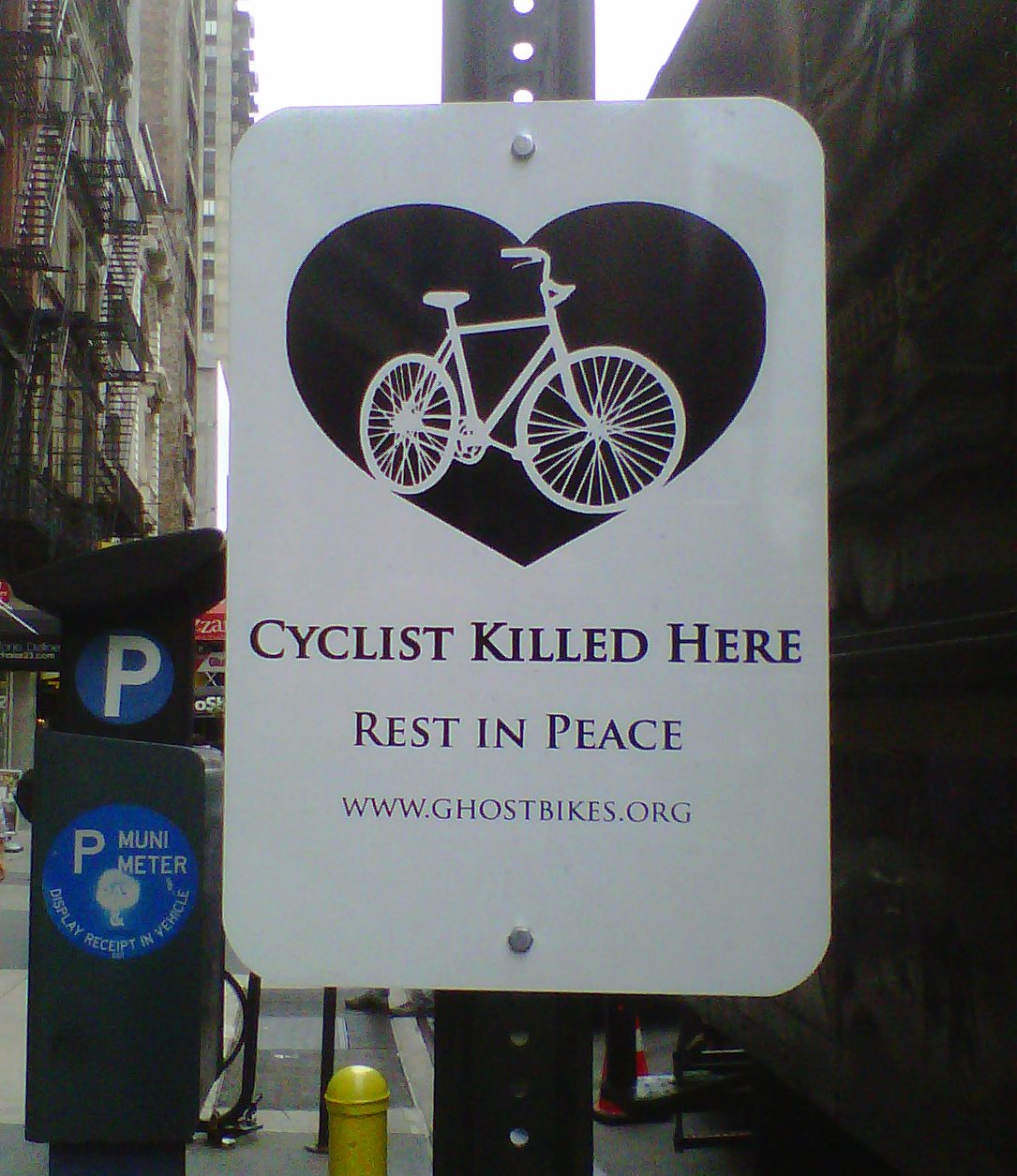
Ghost bike sign in New York City, 2013

Similar projects began in Pittsburgh in 2004, New York City in 2005, Seattle in 2005, Albuquerque in 2010, and Toronto in 2006. In August 2005, nearly 40 ghost bikes were placed throughout Seattle to draw awareness to locations of crashes, near-misses, and poor road conditions. A ghost bike in Dupont Circle, Washington, D.C., commemorating a rider killed by a garbage truck in 2008, remained for a full year. When it was removed by city employees, friends of the rider replaced it with 22 ghost bikes, one on every lamppost. London Ghostcycle was active in 2005 and 2006. There have been similar projects in dozens of other cities worldwide. A bike memorial project was started in Durham, North Carolina, in 2013 to commemorate the deaths of two prominent cyclists and bicycle-safety advocates.

In late 2013 and early 2014, the Houston Ghost Bike Group placed 47 ghost bikes to raise awareness during an especially deadly period of traffic collisions in Houston, many of them hit-and-runs. Later in 2014 the group was preparing 13 more bikes to bring the list of recent deaths up to date.

As of 2017 there were over 630 ghost bikes that have appeared in over 210 locations throughout the world. No single entity governs the installation of all ghost bikes, and they are sometimes removed by those who dislike the practice.

== Opposition ==
Although ghost bikes are put in place as memorials, there are those who do not agree with them or their messages. One objection is that setting them in or beside the road may impede road maintenance. However, as long as they do not obstruct the road or obscure street signs, the bicycles are not usually removed.

== Gallery ==
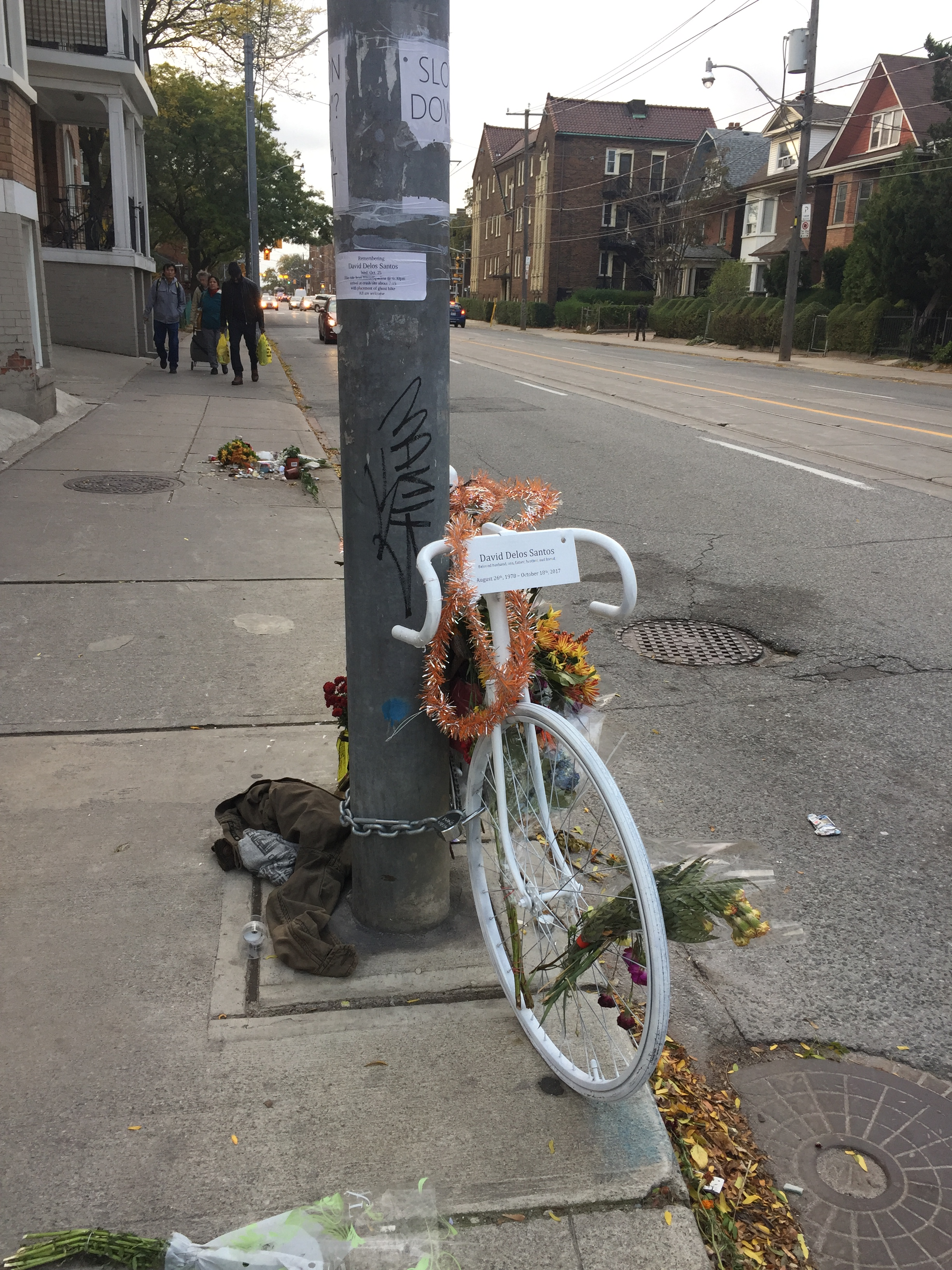
Ghost bike in Parkdale, Toronto, memorializing David Delos Santos, who was killed in 2017 by a truck driver

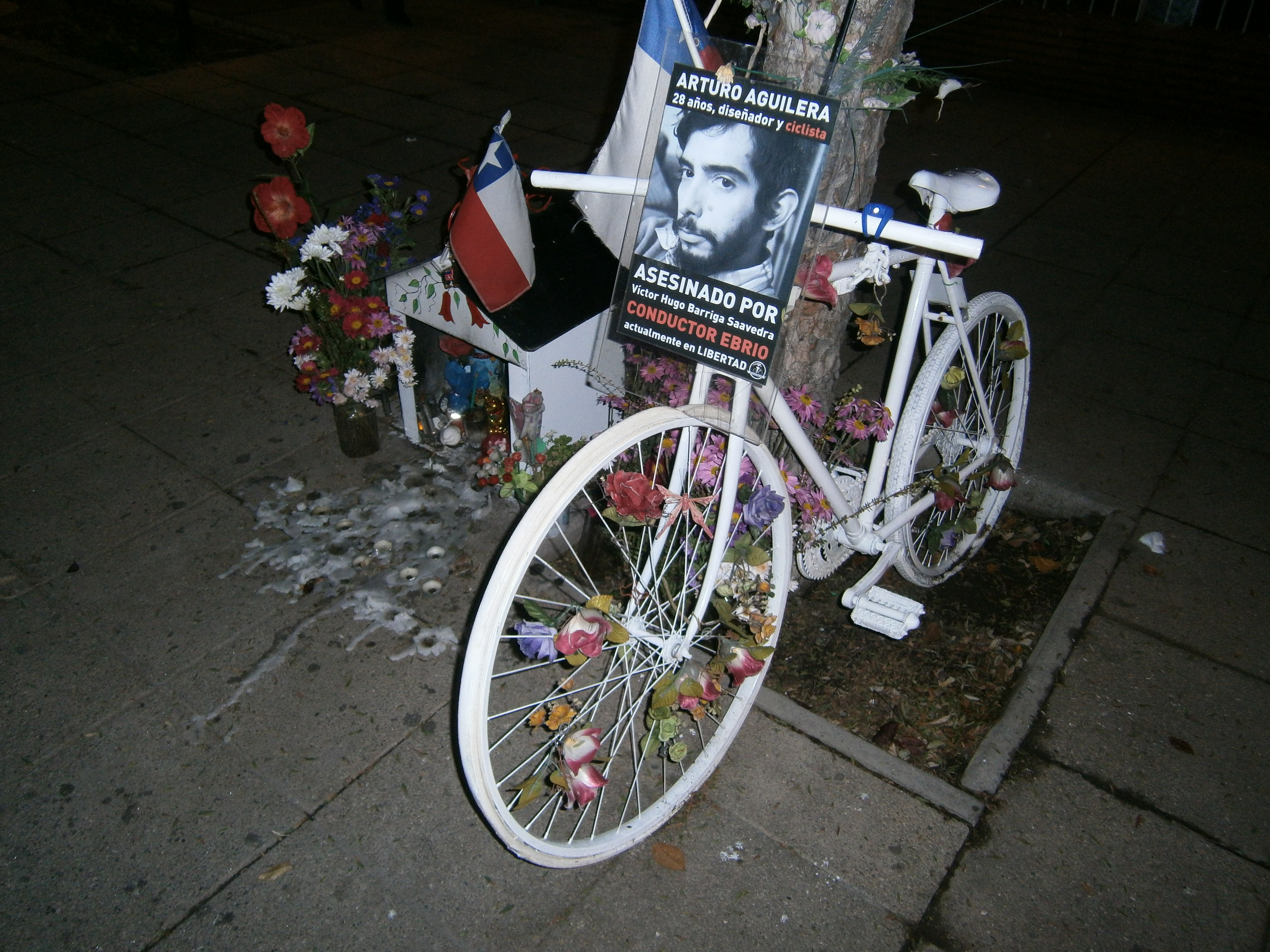
Ghost bike or "Bicianimita" in Santiago, Chile, with a traditional small house for the soul, commemorating Arturo Aguilera, killed 2012

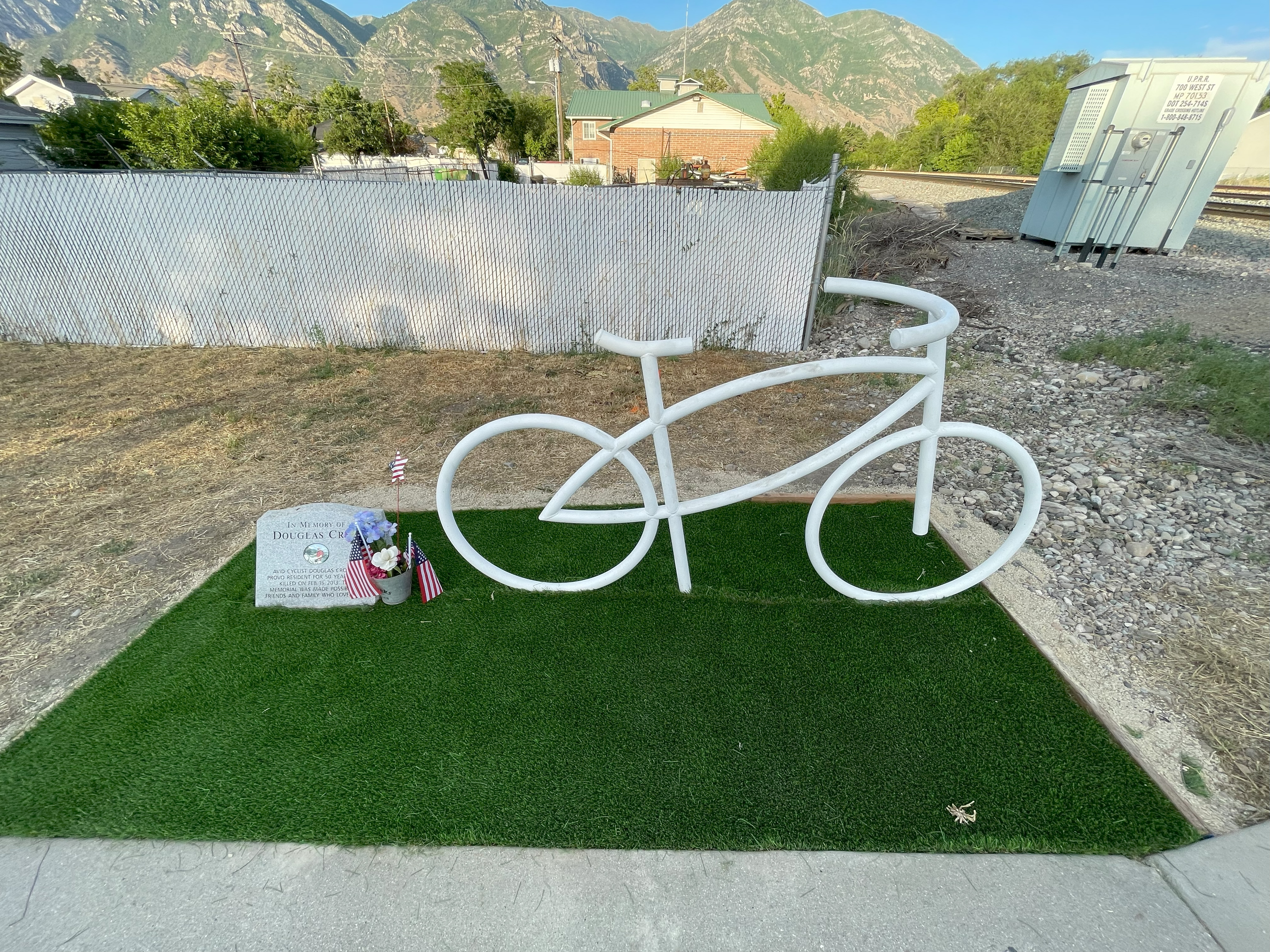
Ghost bike in Provo, Utah, USA, commemorating Douglas Crow, killed February 2013

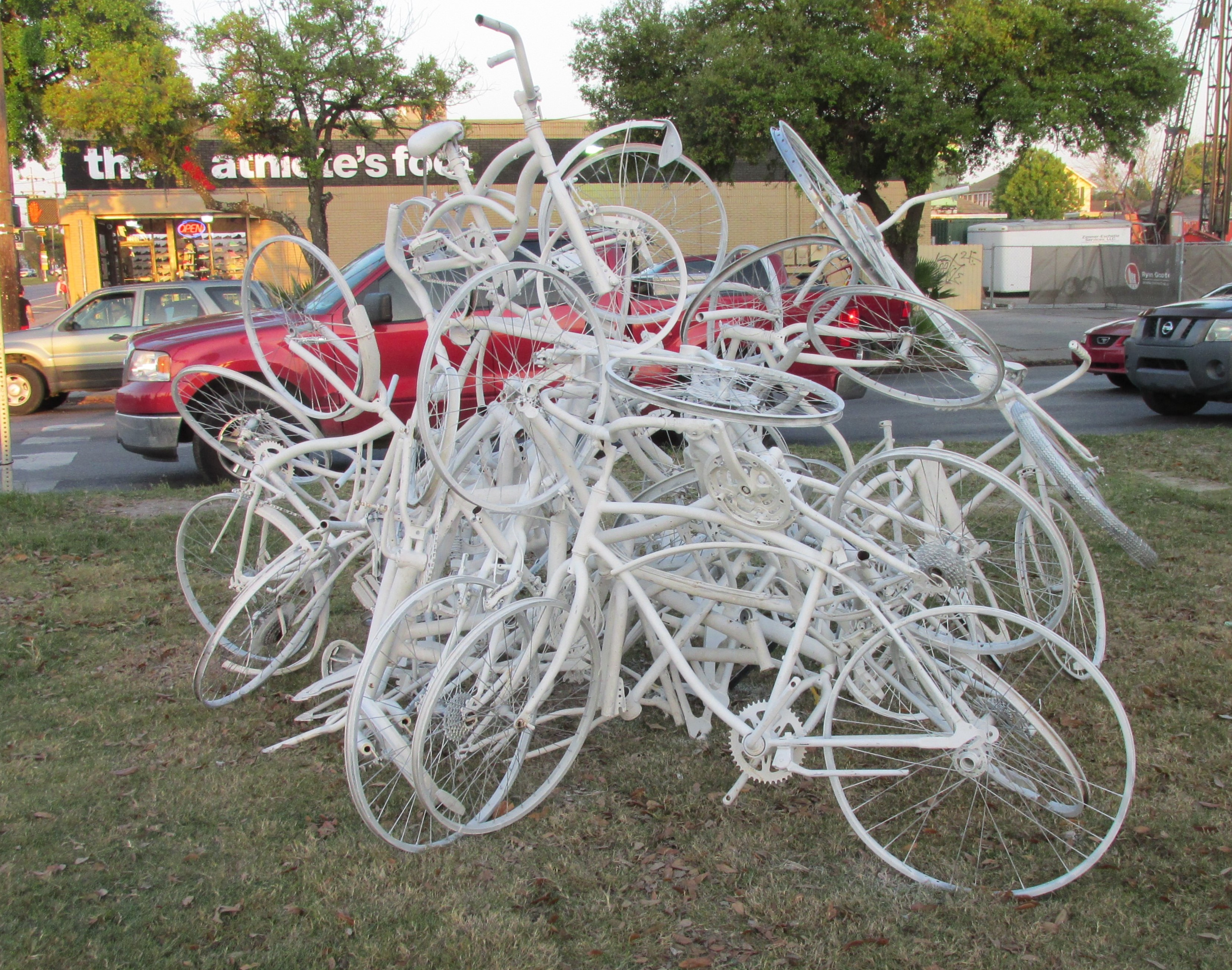
Ghost bike sculpture on Elysian Fields Avenue, New Orleans, 2017

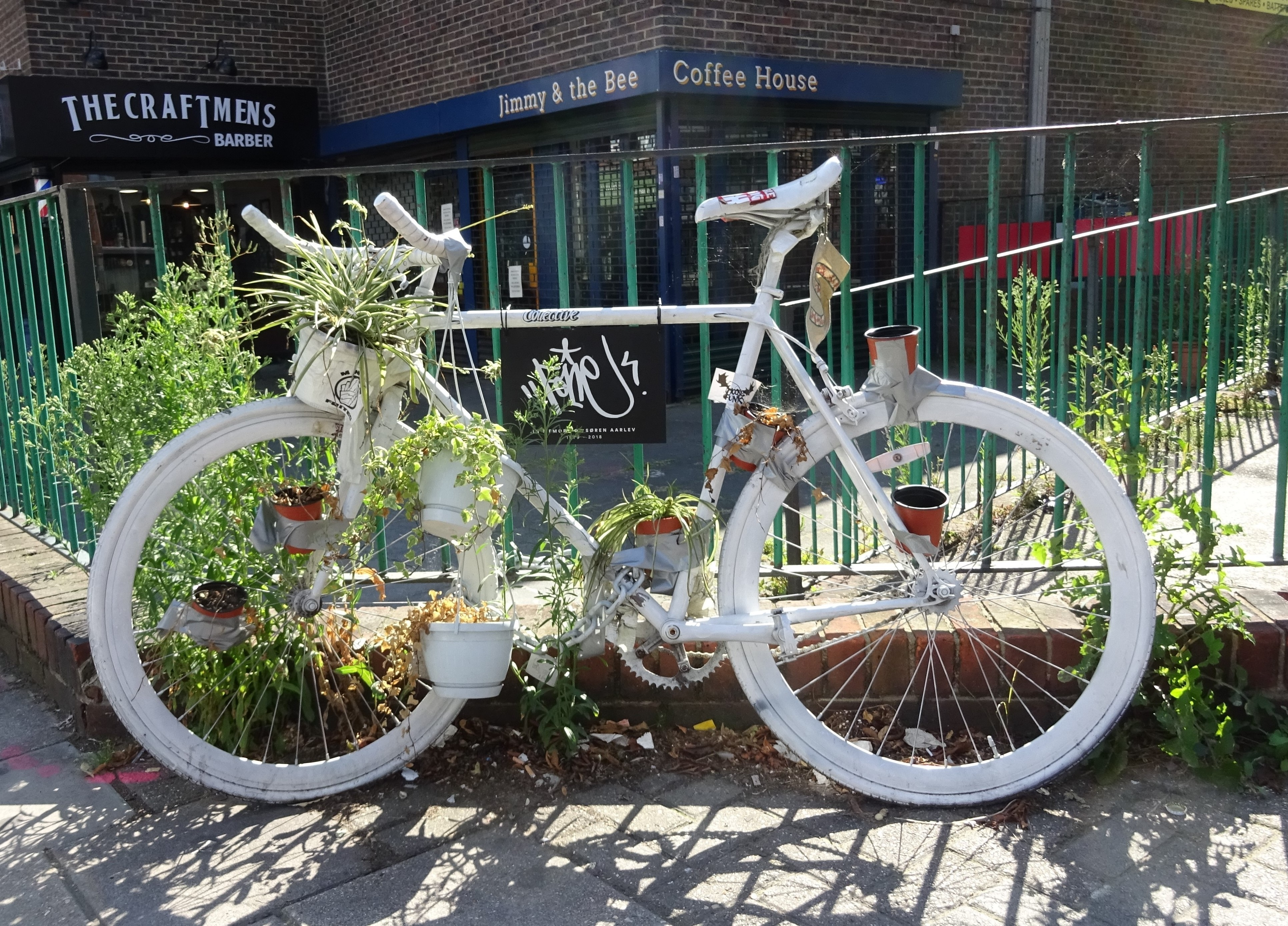
Ghost bike in Goswell Road, London, commemorating Søren Aarlev, killed July 2018

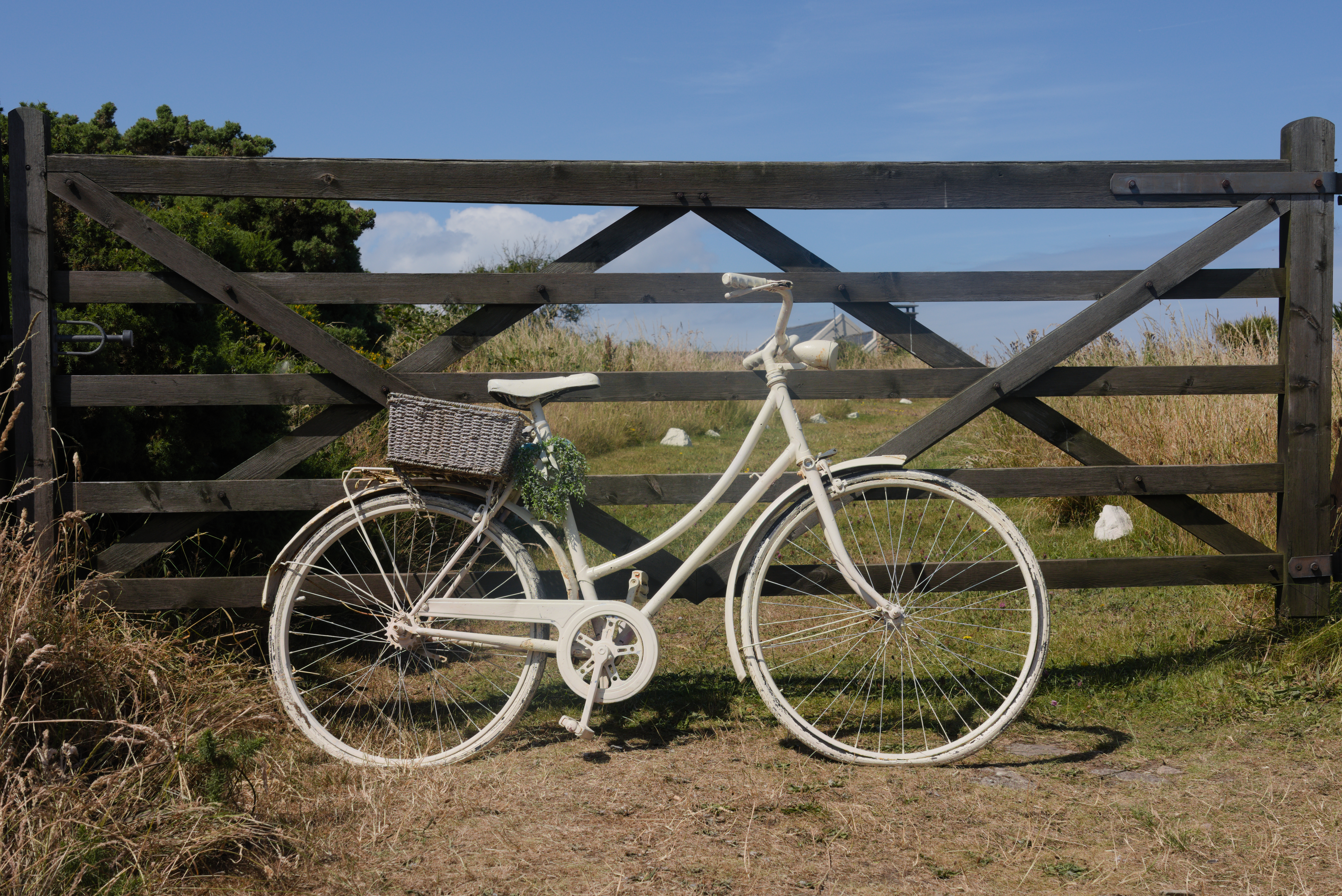
Ghost bike in Howth, Dublin, 2022

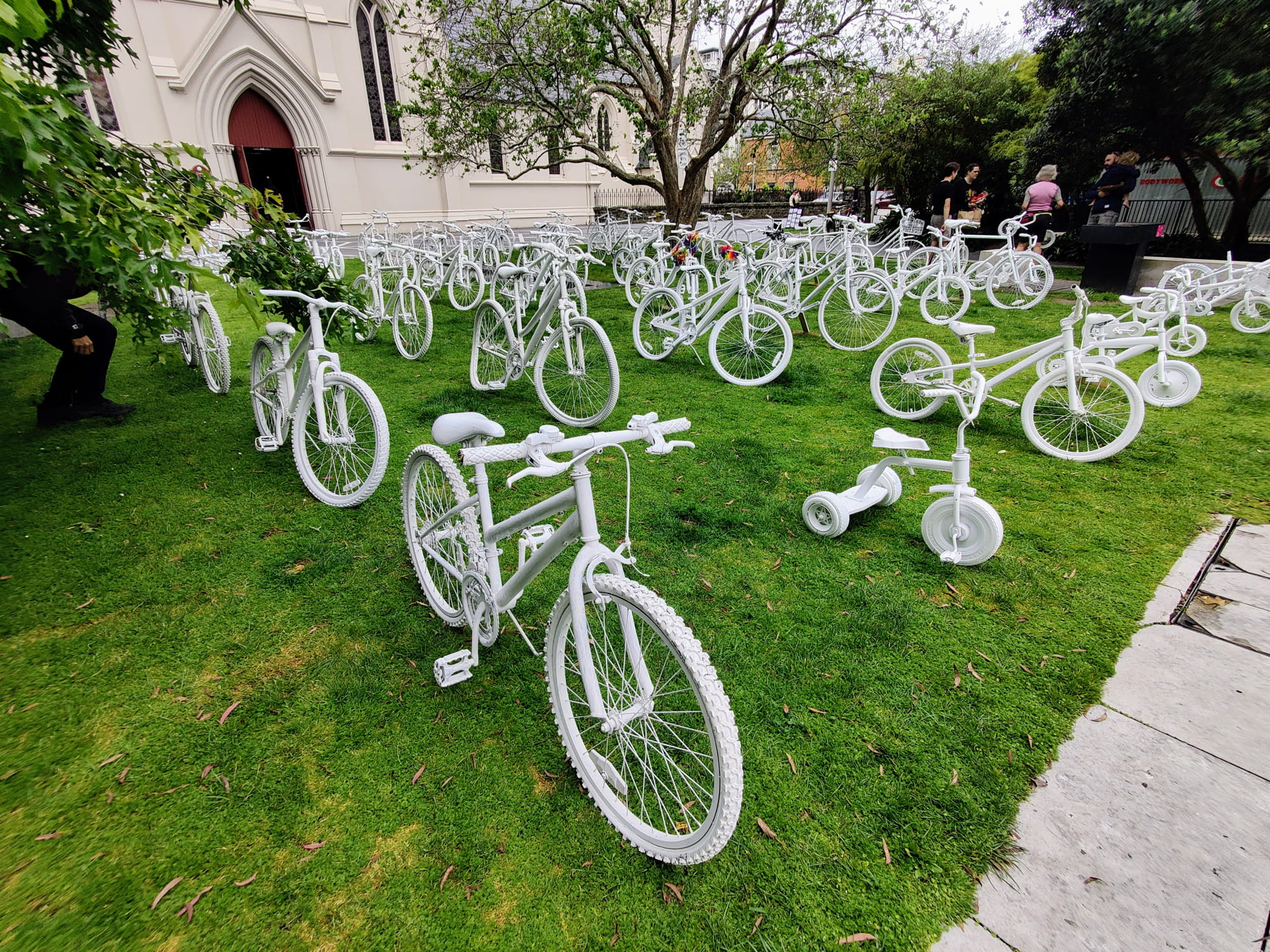
59 ghost bikes in Auckland: art installation by Bike Auckland marking World Day of Remembrance for Road Traffic Victims, 2024

== See also ==
- Ghost shoes
- Bicycle safety
- Ride of Silence
- Tactical urbanism
- Orphan bicycle, a bicycle abandoned in a public space
- Vehicular cycling
- Vision Zero, a multi-national road traffic safety project
