= A History of British Fishes =

1835–1836 book by William Yarrell

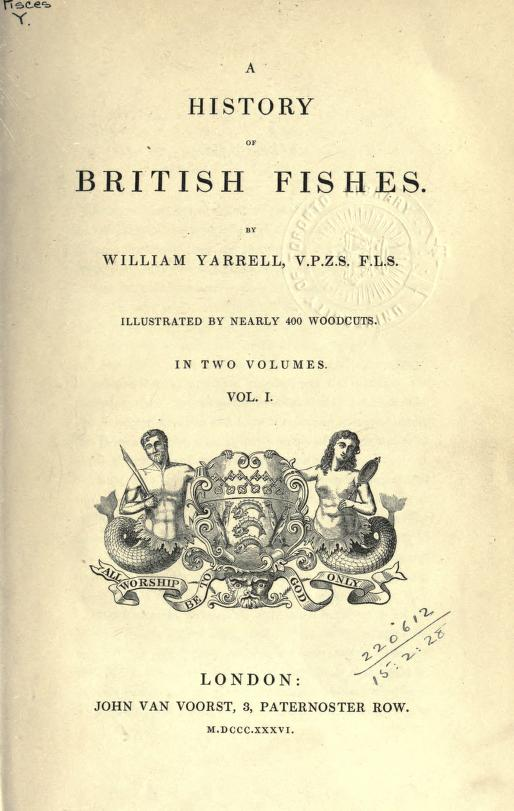
- Title-page of the first edition. It describes the author as VPZS (Vice-President of the Zoological Society) and an FLS (Fellow of the Linnean Society).
- Author: William Yarrell
- Illustrator: Alexander Fussell (drawing); John Thompson (engraving)
- Subject: Fish
- Publisher: John Van Voorst
- Publication date: 1836
- Publication place: England
- Pages: 2 vols (408, 472 pp.)

A History of British Fishes is a natural history book by William Yarrell, serialised in nineteen parts from 1835, and then published bound in two volumes in 1836. It is a handbook or field guide systematically describing every type of fish found in the British Isles, with an article for each species.

Yarrell was a London bookseller and newsagent with the time and income to indulge his interest in natural history. He was a prominent member of several natural history societies and knew most of the leading British naturalists of his day. He was able to draw on his own extensive library and collection of specimens, his wide network of like-minded naturalist friends, and his access to major libraries to garner material for his writings, the most important of which were A History of British Fishes and the 1843 A History of British Birds.

A History of British Fishes followed the example of Thomas Bewick's natural history books in its combination of up-to-date scientific data, accurate illustrations, detailed descriptions and varied anecdotes. The wood engraving illustrations were drawn by Alexander Fussell and engraved by John Thompson; three editions and their two supplements were published by John Van Voorst's company, based in Paternoster Row, London. Yarrell died in 1856, and the third edition was produced posthumously. The work was a commercial success and became the standard reference work for a generation of British ichthyologists. Yarrell's name is commemorated in eight species, three of which are fish, and in the lightfish genus Yarrella.

== Author ==
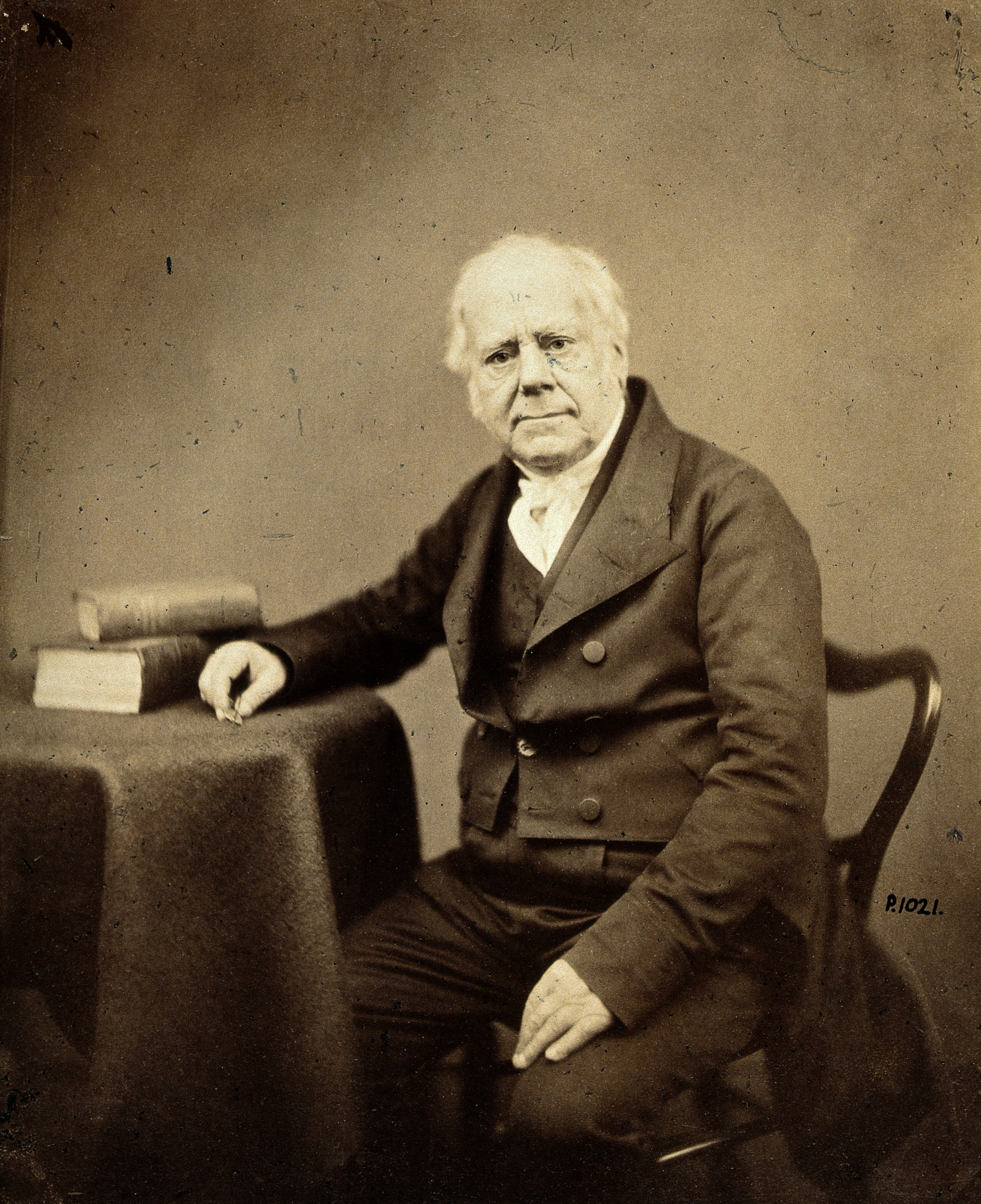
William Yarrell in 1855

William Yarrell (1784–1856) was the son of Francis Yarrell and his wife Sarah, née Blane. William's father and his cousin William Jones were partners as booksellers and newsagents in London. William joined the business in 1803 after leaving school, and inherited the company in 1850.

Yarrell had the free time and income to indulge his hobbies of shooting and fishing, and started to show an interest in rare birds, sending some specimens to the engraver and author Thomas Bewick. He became a keen student of natural history and collector of birds, fish, and other wildlife, and by 1825 he had a substantial collection. He was active in the London learned societies, and held senior posts in several for many years. He was treasurer of the Linnean Society from May 1849, until his death in 1856, vice president of the Zoological Society of London from 1839 to 1851, treasurer of the Royal Entomological Society from 1834 to 1852, and was also on the Council of the Medico-Botanical Society.

He knew many of the leading naturalists of his day, which helped him in the production of his books and articles, notably A History of British Fishes and his 1843 A History of British Birds.

== Background ==
=== Written sources ===
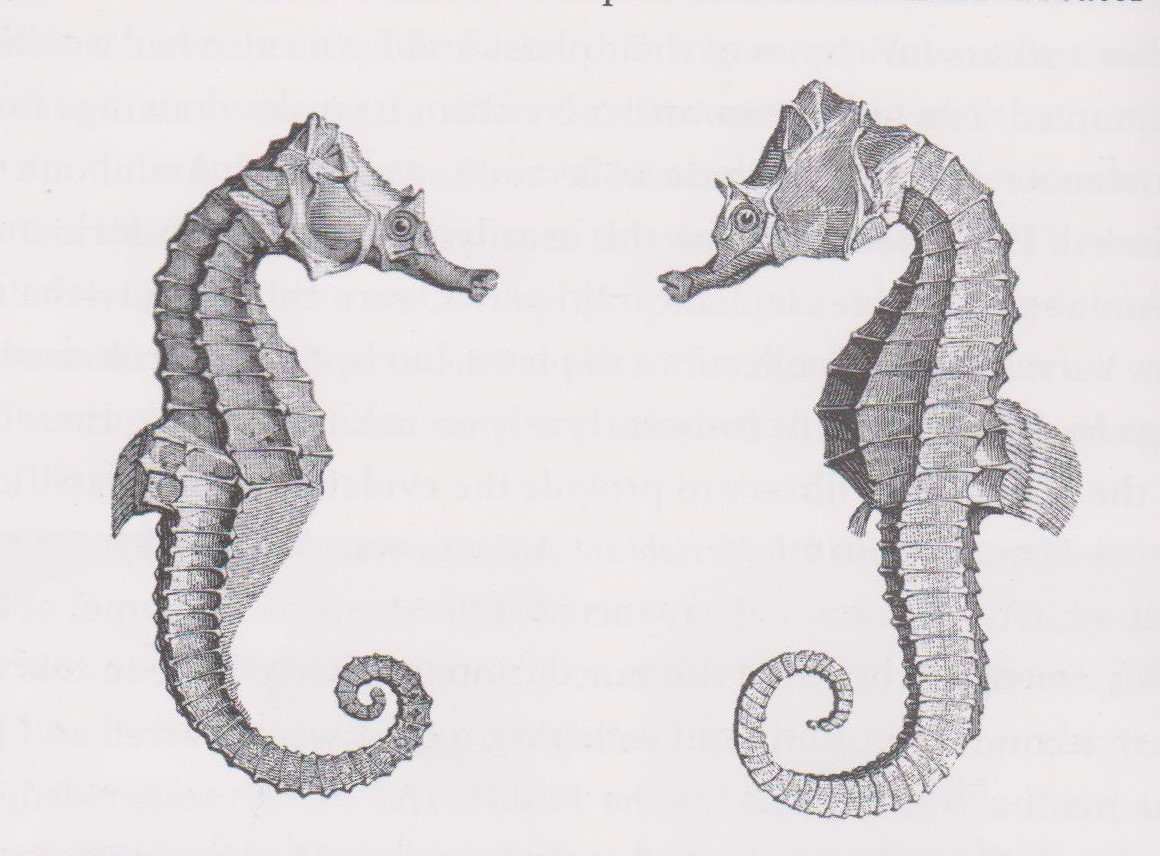
Yarrell established that male seahorses carry fertilised eggs in a pouch.

Interest in natural history was growing rapidly in the early nineteenth century, and several writers sought to provide definitive lists of species found in Britain, with descriptions and other pertinent information. When Yarrell came to tackle the fish, written sources were limited. Edward Donovan's The Natural History of British Fishes (1802–1808) was the only reasonably recent specialist book, although Thomas Pennant's British Zoology (1812) and Bewick's A Natural History of British Quadrupeds (1808) were among other publications that covered some British fish.

The most notable foreign sources were the Histoire naturelle des poissons (1828–1831) by Baron Georges Cuvier and Achille Valenciennes, which contained descriptions of five thousand species of fishes, and Marcus Elieser Bloch's beautifully illustrated twelve-volume Allgemeine Naturgeschichte der Fische (1782–1795). The French book was important because Cuvier and Valenciennes had grouped similar species together, providing a logical order to their book. Yarrell had membership of the libraries of the British Museum and the Linnaean Society, and his friends gave him access to college collections and their own private libraries and notebooks. Yarrell personally owned at least 2000 books, of which about 80 were concerned with fish or fishing. The posthumous sale of his books in 1856 raised £1100. (Note: £1,600,000 at 2025 rates; December 2025 prices calculated using Bank of England calculator for 1856)

=== Other resources ===
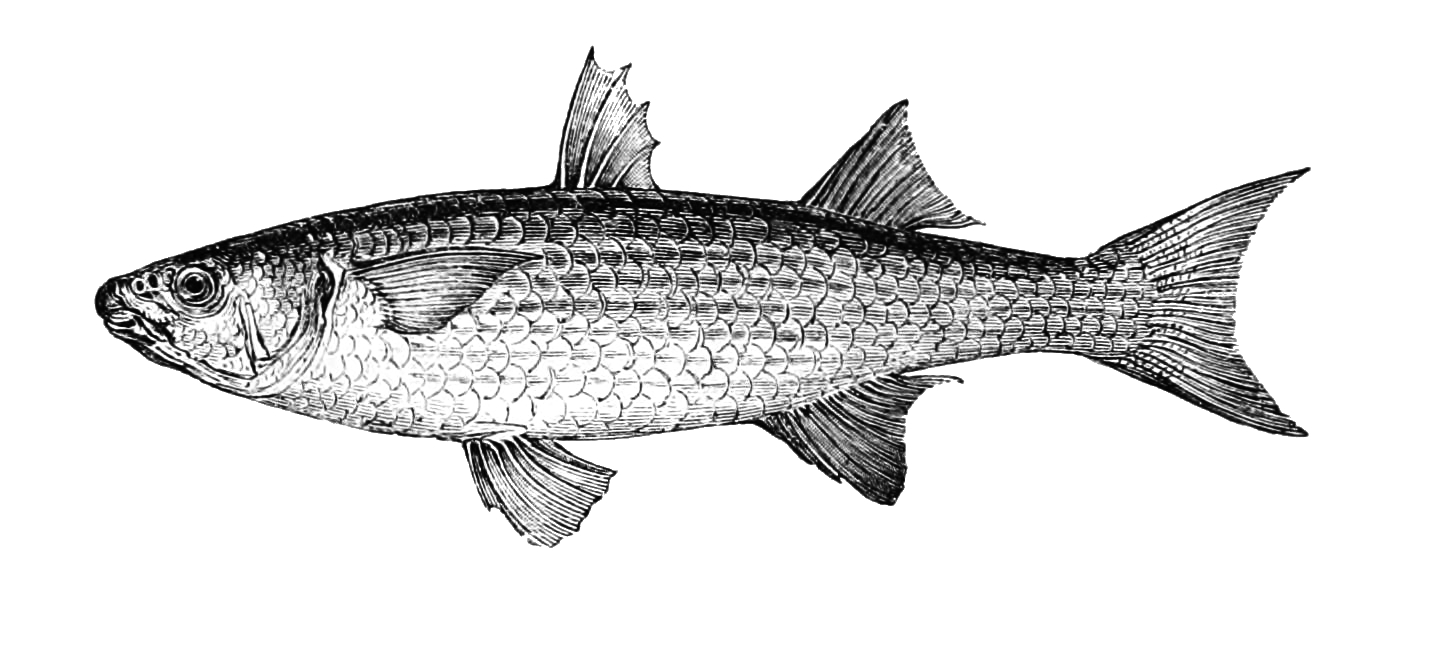
The drawing for the thicklip grey mullet was given to Yarrell by Edward Lear.

Yarrell was a keen fisherman, and his journeys to English south coast locations like Brighton, Weymouth and Hastings gave him direct access to fresh specimens. He also frequented fish vendors, particularly in London's important markets, and had a network of fisherman-naturalist contacts, eight of whom he named in the preface to his book, notably the Cornishman Jonathan Couch, (Note: Couch had a unique set of the Fishes, with blank sheets bound in between most pairs of the printed pages that he used for notes and annotations.) who provided him with many fish specimens from the southwest of England. Fellow members of the learned societies he belonged to also helped him with specimens. Yarrell had 220 species of fish as preserved specimens in his personal collection, now held in the Natural History Museum. Fish were mostly preserved in spirits of wine, a strong ethanol solution, although whisky was an alternative used in Scotland. (Note: Yarrell had seen Cuban specimens kept in rum, but cautioned against the use of gin, which was usually too dilute to be effective.)

As a London-based bookseller and an active member of London's learned societies, Yarrell had contact with many fellow naturalists who could help him with books, illustrations and notes, as well as specimens. He was a life-long friend of clergyman naturalist Leonard Jenyns, and a regular correspondent with the taxidermist John Gould, Sir William Jardine, the Earl of Derby, Edward Lear and Charles Darwin. Yarrell's knowledge of avian anatomy helped Lear develop his bird painting skills by teaching him that feather tracts follow the muscle contours, and he in return provided a drawing of a thicklip grey mullet for the fish book.

Yarrell made significant discoveries of his own, including showing that male seahorses and pipefish carried fertilised eggs in a pouch, and clarifying how many Salmo (salmon and trout) species occurred in Britain.

== Format ==
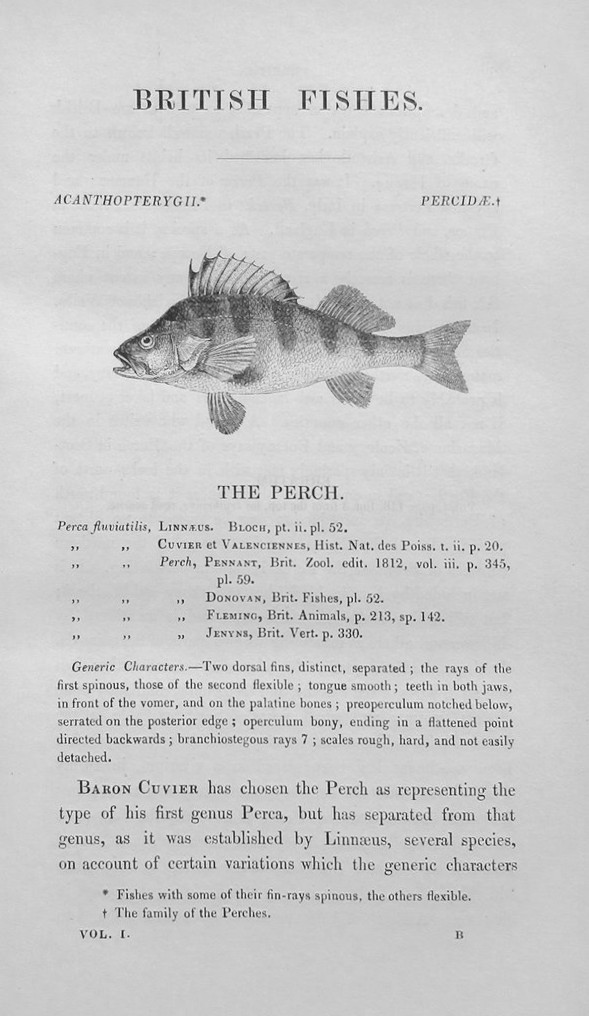
The perch, vol. 1, page 1

Yarrell was a great admirer of Thomas Bewick (he named a new wildfowl species "Bewick's swan" after the engraver). Bewick's A History of British Birds, published in two volumes in 1797 and in 1804, had brought him nationwide fame, and since Yarrell owned several editions of Bewick's books, he followed the older man's format for his own fish project. (Note: Although Bewick's Birds is specifically British, it is considered to be the forerunner of all modern field guides. Bewick had planned to write a book on British fishes, but neither he nor his son, Robert, completed the project.)

Volume 1 has a preface which also acknowledges the people who had helped Yarrell with his project, followed by an introduction discussing the general characteristics of fish (fifteen pages in the first edition) and an alphabetical index before the main species accounts start. There was no established taxonomic sequence for arranging fish, so where possible Yarrell followed Cuvier and Valenciennes, otherwise using anatomical resemblances in features including fins, teeth, and head bones to order his species.

Each entry started with a wood engraving of the species, followed by its scientific and English names and their synonyms, and a lead section "Generic characteristics" summarising the key anatomical features. The main text described the fish in more detail, noted when it was recorded as a British species, mentioned interesting anatomical characteristics, described its habits in terms of gregariousness and water depth, and recorded where it could be found in Britain and Europe. Yarrell also ate many of the fish he described so that he could comment on their palatability. A typical example is Yarrell's first entry, for the perch. As well as the expected detailed anatomical and geographical information, in the five-page text he notes:

In rivers, the Perch prefers the sides of the stream rather than the rapid parts of the current, and feeds indiscriminately upon insects, worms, and small fishes ... So remarkable is the Perch for its boldness and voracity, that in a few days ... Mr. Jesse tells us, they came freely and took worms from his fingers ... They are constantly exhibited in the markets of Catholic countries, and, if not sold, are taken back to the ponds from which they were removed in the morning, to be reproduced another day. The flesh of this fish is firm, white, of good flavour, and easy of digestion ... The Perch, though very common, is one of the most beautiful of our fresh-water fishes, and, when in good condition, its colours are brilliant and striking ...

== Production and publication ==
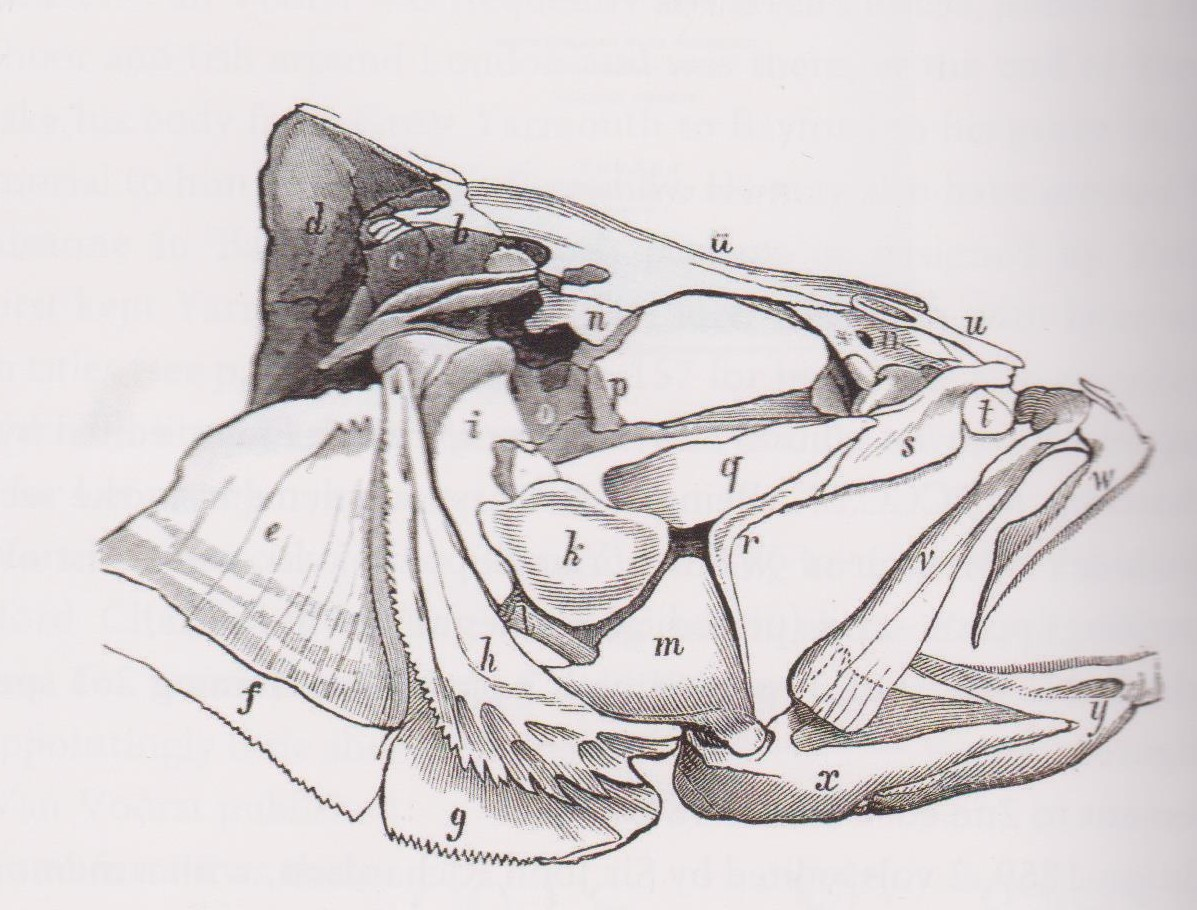
The bones of a perch head lettered for an identification key

Yarrell's illustrations were wood engravings made using the techniques pioneered by Bewick in which boxwood blocks were engraved on their ends using a burin, a tool with a V‑shaped tip. The new illustrations for the fish book were drawn onto the blocks by Alexander Fussell and cut by John Thompson, both of whom also worked on the later bird book. The most expensive part of producing illustrated books in the nineteenth century was the hand colouring of printed plates, mainly by young women. By using monochrome illustrations Yarrell could avoid this outlay and the associated costs of having the illustrations separate from the text and printed on a different grade of paper. The quality of the illustrations in Yarrell's books was very high, because he could afford to employ Thompson and his sons. Thompson senior was later to win a médaille d'or at the 1855 Paris Exhibition.

William Swainson suggested to Yarrell that he should produce separate offprints of the illustrations and have them coloured for separate sale as a profitable additional venture, but Yarrell refused. There were practical problems in that the wood engraving blocks were set in the same formes as the letterpress for the text, and, if separated, the extra printing demand would wear out the wooden blocks, especially without the protection of the surrounding raised metal type. Yarrell also objected on principle to the prints being sold separately. The book was originally published in 19 fascicules (parts), each priced at 2/6d (12.5p). (Note: £12.50 at 2025 values; December 2025 prices calculated using Bank of England calculator for 1836) The last part contained an index.

The publisher of Yarrell's books was John Van Voorst, whose business was in Paternoster Row, a street central to the London publishing trade. He began to specialise in natural history publications and was appointed official bookseller to the London Zoological Society in 1837. Van Voorst often visited Yarrell's house, and joined him to shoot and fish on estates and streams around London. He was a Fellow of the Linnean Society and a founding fellow of the Royal Microscopical Society, established in 1839.

=== Editions ===
Three editions and three supplements were published by Van Voorst.

- 1835–36 Two volumes originally published in 19 parts. 226 species described and figured, and 140 vignettes. Volume 1, 408 pp., volume 2, 472 pp.
- 1839 Supplement, 27 new species. Volume 1, 48 pp., volume 2, 78 pp.
- 1841 Second edition, two volumes containing 263 species and 500 figures. Volume 1, 464 pp., volume 2, 628 pp.
- 1859 Posthumous third edition, two volumes, edited by explorer and naturalist Sir John Richardson. In this edition, the text was preceded by a "Memoir of William Yarrell" and a list of his publications. Volume 1, 679 pp., volume 2, 673 pp.
- 1860 Second supplement to first edition, edited by Sir John Richardson, also being the first supplement to the second edition, 71 pp.

=== Other publications ===
Yarrell's many other ichthyological works included an 1839 three-page, 30.5 by 44 cm (12.0 by 17.3 in) oblong folio, On the Growth of the Salmon in Fresh Water, with drawings in the text and six life-sized coloured illustrations of the fish, chapter 8, "Marine Fishes", in William Henry Harvey's 1854 The Sea-Side Book, and an article on Eurasian dace in the Transactions of the Linnean Society of London.

== Reception ==
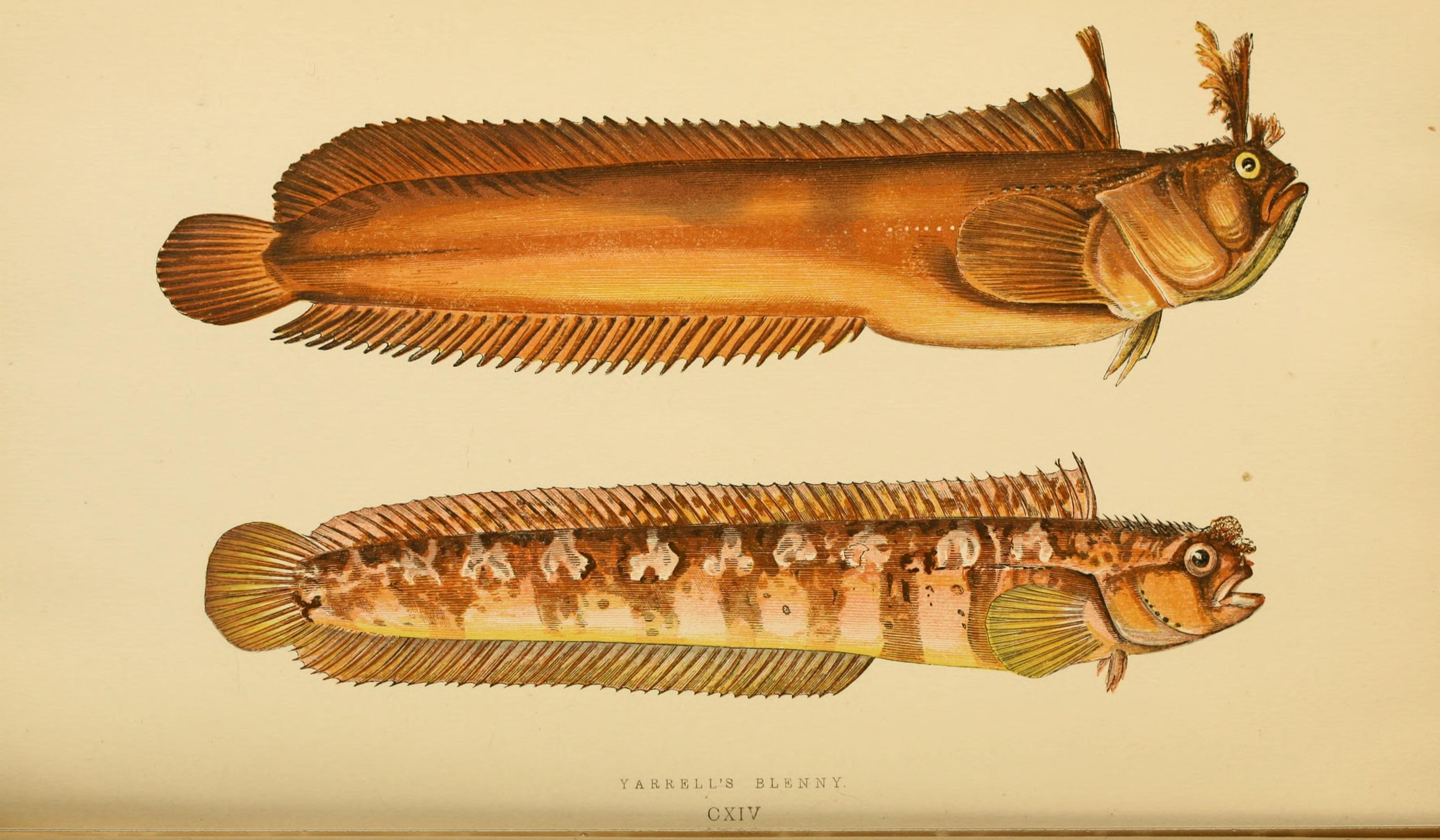
Yarrell's blenny from Jonathan Couch's A History of the Fishes of the British Islands

Publications writing contemporary positive reviews of A History of British Fishes included The Athenaeum, The Gentleman's Magazine, Leigh Hunt's London Journal, the London Medical Gazette and The Quarterly Review.

The Gentleman's Magazine said

... the task could not have been undertaken by one more competent for it. History and patient observations are enriched by a science of no ordinary kind ... We have little hesitation, therefore, in saying that the work before us is, perhaps, the most perfect of its kind which has been yet published. It is written in a style at once clear and satisfactory, and the illustrations are quite equal, if not superior, to those of Bewick's birds and quadrupeds. Indeed, we hardly thought it possible that fish could be so perfectly represented by engravings on wood ...

The Quarterly Review saw the book as of wider importance. Near the end of a 35-page review, it states

This book ought to be largely circulated, not only on account of its scientific merits – though these, as we have in part shown, are great and signal – but because it is popularly written throughout, and therefore likely to excite general attention to a subject which ought to be held as one of primary importance by all those gentlemen of education and property who happen to be more immediately connected with some of the most extensive, and which might be among the most useful and important, districts of this empire.

The passage continues with the promotion of sea fish as a means to relieve famine.

There was a generally appreciative reception from Yarrell's fellow naturalists. Prideaux John Selby, an ornithologist and natural history artist, wrote to Jardine after receiving the first part to say how impressed he was with the beautifully executed woodcuts and the quality of the printing, and later, when he had the complete set, said to the same recipient that it was a "very beautiful work", although a few of the fish could have been better illustrated. Jardine himself published an enthusiastic review in his Magazine of Botany and Zoology.

A History of British Fishes and the later A History of British Birds were both immediately commercially successful and became standard texts until the end of the nineteenth century. Van Voorst believed that Yarrell made around £4000 (Note: About £410,000 at 2025 rates; December 2025 prices calculated using Bank of England calculator over the period 1836–1856) from the two books.

Yarrell's name is commemorated in eight species, three of which are fish. These are Yarrell's blenny (Chirolophis ascanii), from the European North Atlantic coasts; the giant devil catfish, Bagarius yarrelli, from the rivers of the Indian subcontinent; and Laemonema yarrellii, a deep sea morid cod from Madeira and the Great Meteor Seamount of the North Atlantic. The lightfish genus Yarrella is also named for him.

== Cited texts ==
- Jackson, Christine E (2022). A Newsworthy Naturalist: The Life of William Yarrell. Oxford: John Beaufoy. ISBN 978-1913679-04-0.
- McGhie, Henry A (2017). Henry Dresser and Victorian Ornithology: Birds, Books and Business. Manchester: Manchester University Press. ISBN 978-1-78499-413-6.
- Peck, Robert McCracken (2021). The Natural History of Edward Lear. Princeton: Princeton University Press. ISBN 978-0-691-21723-9.
- Richter, Emil Heinrich (1914). Prints : a brief review of their technique and history. Boston: Houghton.
- Uglow, Jenny (2006). Nature's Engraver: A Life of Thomas Bewick. Croydon: Faber and Faber. ISBN 978-0-571-22375-6.
- Yarrell, William (1836). A History of British Fishes. Vol. 1 (First ed.). London: Van Voorst.
