= Howard Saunders =

British businessman and ornithologist (1835–1907)

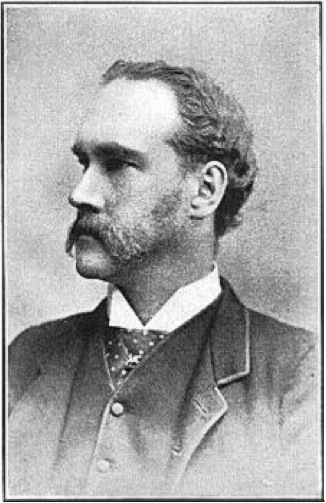
- Born: 16 September 1835; London
- Died: 20 October 1907 (aged 72)
- Known for: Gulls; Terns
- Scientific career
- Fields: Ornithology

Howard Saunders (16 September 1835 – 20 October 1907) was a British businessman, who later in life became a noted ornithologist, specialising in gulls and terns.

== Life and work ==
Saunders was born in London on 16 September 1835. He received his early education at Leatherhead and Rottingdean. He entered business as a merchant banker, which allowed him to travel widely. From 1855 to 1862 he travelled in Brazil and Chile.

After 1862 Saunders devoted himself to the study of the birds of Spain. He published several articles on the subject in The Ibis, having visited the Pyrenees in 1883 and 1884. He also published articles on the birds of Switzerland in 1891, and an account of The Distribution of Birds in France in 1893. He was the co-editor with P. L. Sclater for The Ibis in 1883–1886 and 1895–1900.

Saunders was an expert on gulls and terns. Among other duties, he wrote about the gull specimens from the Challenger expedition of 1872–1876.

Saunders served as secretary of the British Ornithologists' Union from 1901 to 1907, and first secretary and treasurer of the British Ornithologists' Club. He was also an active member of the Zoological, Linnean and Royal Geographical Societies.

== Ornithological publications ==
In 1869 his first article on the birds of Spain was published in The Ibis.

In 1872 he described a new species of green woodpecker, the Iberian green woodpecker, that inhibits the Iberian Peninsula. He called it Gecinus sharpii (now Picus sharpii), after the name of its discoverer, Richard Bowdler Sharpe (1847-1909).

In 1889 the first edition of the Illustrated Manual of British Birds was published. It was issued in twenty parts in 1888 and 1889. In The Zoologist of 1888 appeared a 'notice' about parts i-iv.

Ten years later a second edition appeared. The third edition was published twenty years after the death of Saunders and was revised and enlarged by William Eagle Clarke.

== Legacy ==
Two species of birds have been named after him:

- Saunders's gull
- Saunders's tern

== Bibliography ==
- Saunders, Howard (1869). "Ornithological Rambles in Spain". The Ibis. New Series, Vol. V: 170–186.
- —— (6 February 1872). "On a new Species of Green Woodpecker from Southern Europe". Proceedings of the Zoological Society of London: 153/4.
- —— (5 March 1872). "On the Occurrence of Falco barbarus and Cypselus pallidus on the Continent of Europe". Proceedings of the Zoological Society of London.
- —— (January 1876). "On the Sterninae, or Terns, with Descriptions of three new Species". Journal of Zoology. 44 (1): 638–672. doi:10.1111/j.1096-3642.1876.tb02598.x.; also published as
  —— (20 June 1876). "On the Sterninae, or Terns, with Descriptions of three new Species". Proceedings of the Zoological Society of London: 638–672.
- Third and fourth (1885) editions of Yarrell's A History of British Birds
- —— (1889). Illustrated Manual of British Birds. London: Gurney and Jackson. OCLC 4671598.
  - 1899: 2nd ed., revised and enlarged, "with 384 illustrations and 3 coloured maps"
  - 1927: 3rd ed.: "Manual of British Birds" by Howard Saunders; Third edition revised and enlarged by William Eagle Clarke, I.S.O., LL.D. London : Gurney and Jackson.
- ——; Salvin, Osbert (1896). Catalogue of the Gaviae and Tubinares in the collection of the British Museum. Gaviae (terns, gulls, and skuas). Catalogue of the birds in the British Museum (vol. 25). London: Trustees of the British Museum. OCLC 316592486.

== Sources ==
- "Howard Saunders". Oxford Dictionary of National Biography. 2004–2012.
- Mullens and Swann - A Bibliography of British Ornithology
- Ibis Jubilee Supplement
- Chapman, Abel (July 1908). "Howard Saunders" (PDF). British Birds. 1 (7): 197–202.
- Obituary
