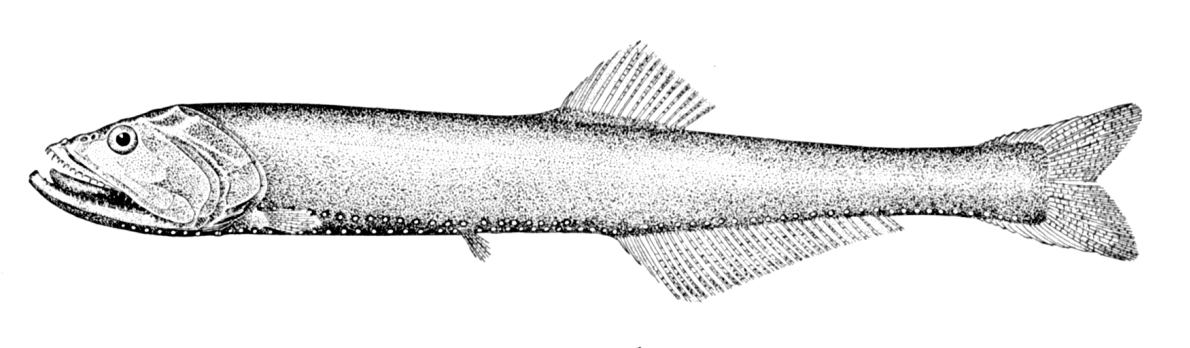
- Yarrella blackfordi

Scientific classification
- Domain: Eukaryota
- Kingdom: Animalia
- Phylum: Chordata
- Class: Actinopterygii
- Order: Stomiiformes
- Family: Phosichthyidae
- Genus: Yarrella; Goode & T. H. Bean, 1896

= Yarrella =

Genus of fishes

Yarrella is a genus of lightfishes. It was named for the English naturalist William Yarrell.

== Species ==
There are currently two recognized species in this genus:

- Yarrella argenteola (Garman, 1899)
- Yarrella blackfordi Goode & T. H. Bean, 1896
