= A History of British Birds (Yarrell book) =

Book by William Yarrell

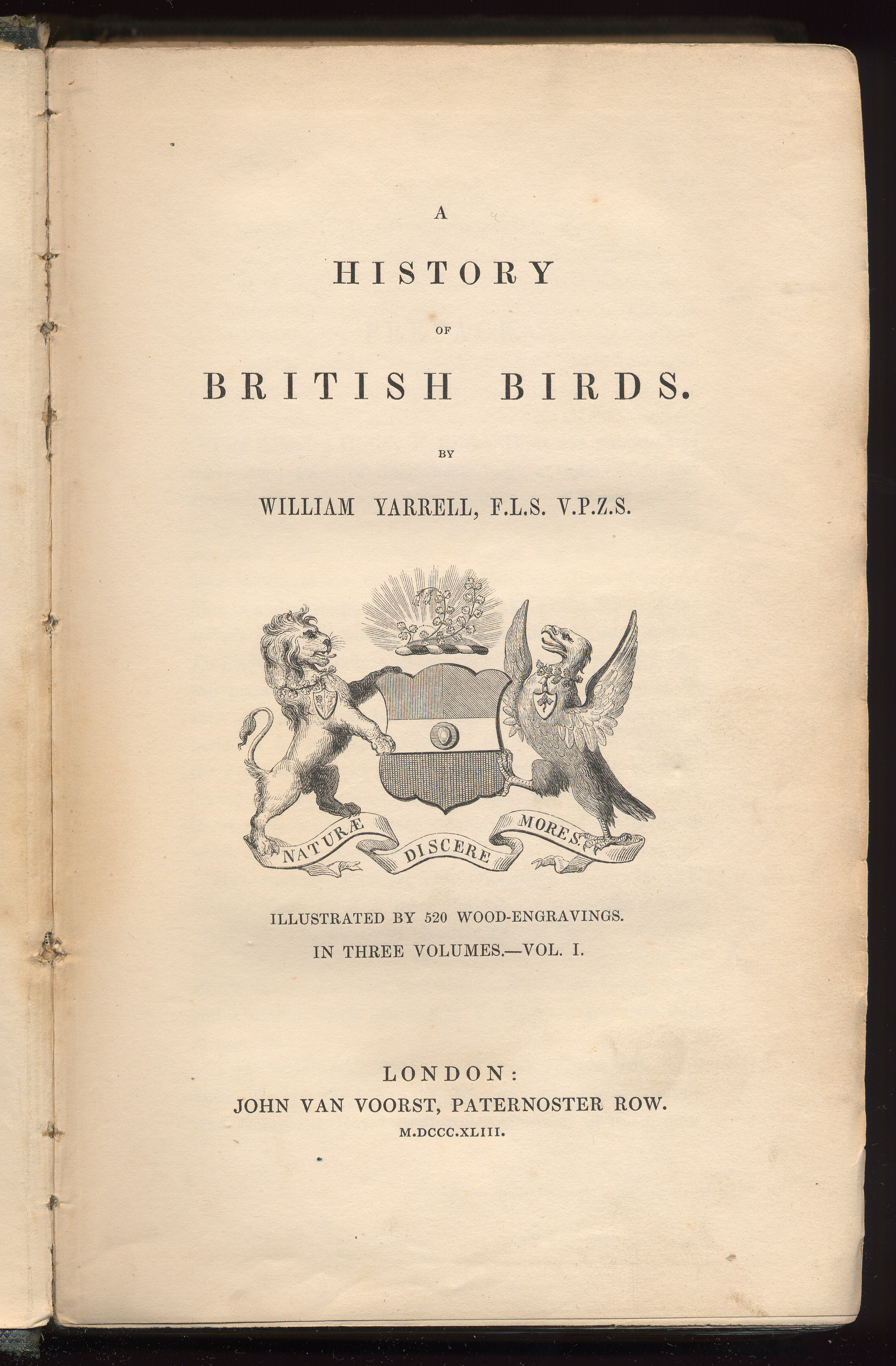
- Title-page of first edition
- Author: William Yarrell
- Illustrator: Alexander Fussell (drawing); John Thompson (engraving)
- Subject: Birds
- Genre: Natural history
- Publisher: John Van Voorst, Paternoster Row, London
- Publication date: 1843
- Publication place: England
- Pages: 3 vols (525, 669, 528 pp.)

William Yarrell's A History of British Birds was first published as a whole in three volumes in 1843, having been serialised, three sheets (=48 pages) every two months, over the previous six years. It is not a history of ornithology but a natural history, a handbook or field guide systematically describing every species of bird known to occur in Britain. A separate article of about six pages, containing an image, a description, and an account of worldwide distribution, together with reports of behaviour, is provided for each species.

It quickly became the standard reference work for a generation of British ornithologists, replacing Thomas Bewick's book of the same name through its increased scientific accuracy, but following Bewick in its mixture of scientific data, accurate illustrations, detailed descriptions and varied anecdotes, as well as in the use of small 'tail-piece' engravings at the ends of articles. This made the book attractive to the public as well as to specialists. Yarrell, a newsagent without university education, corresponded widely with eminent naturalists such as Thomas Pennant and Coenraad Jacob Temminck, and consulted the writings of scientists including Carl Linnaeus, to collect accurate information on the hundreds of species illustrated in the work.

The book is illustrated with over 500 drawings directly onto wood blocks, mostly by Alexander Fussell. These were then engraved by John Thompson. Publication was initially in 37 parts of three large folded sheets each; these were then collected and bound into volumes. Most of the copies were on octavo paper; some "large paper" format copies were printed in the larger royal octavo with just 50 copies in the very large imperial octavo format. Four editions were produced between 1843 and 1885.

== Author ==
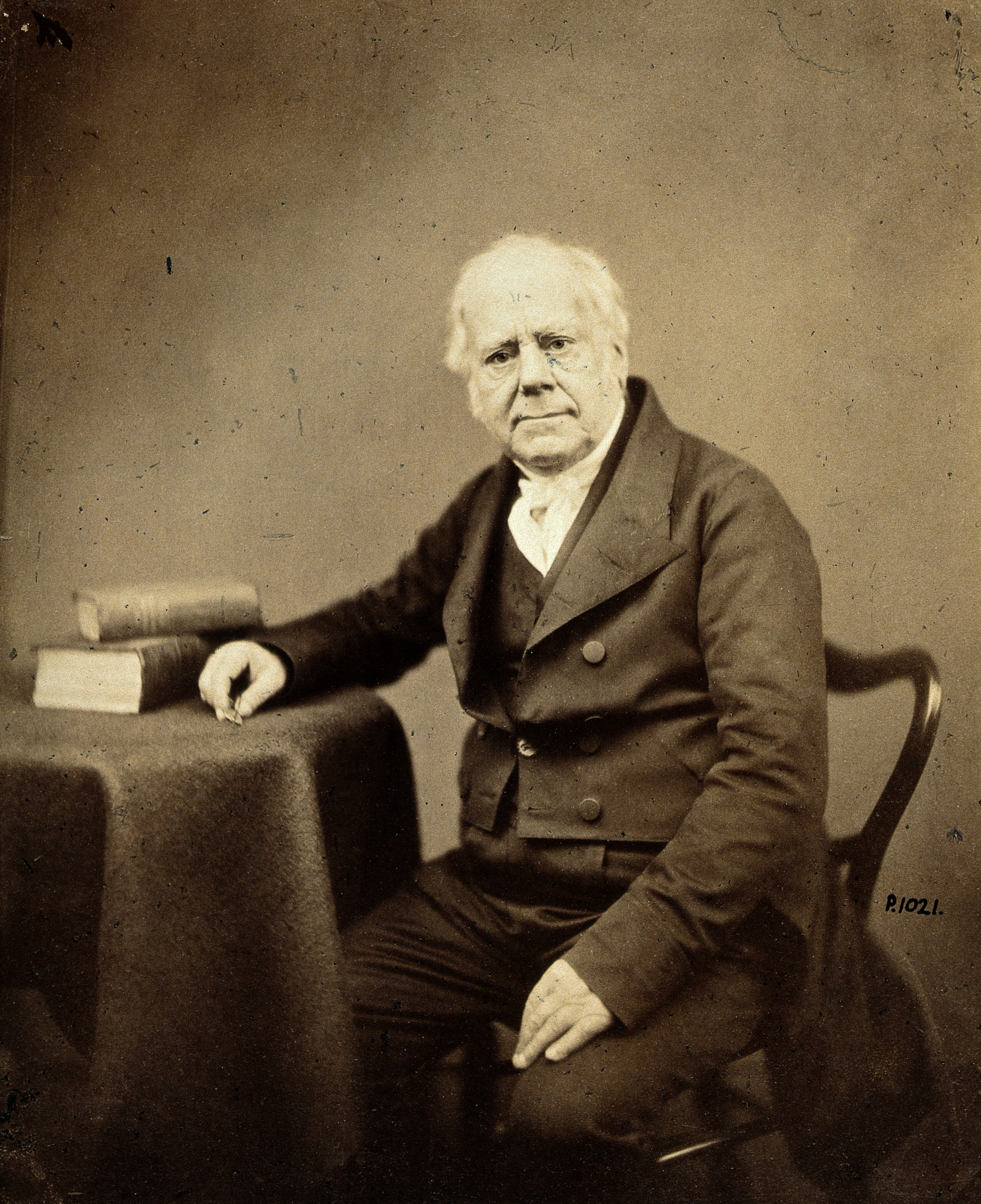
William Yarrell in 1855

William Yarrell (1784–1856) was the son of Francis Yarrell and his wife Sarah, née Blane. William's father and his cousin William Jones were partners as booksellers and newsagents in London. William joined the business in 1803 after leaving school, and inherited the company in 1850.

Yarrell had the free time and income to indulge his hobbies of shooting and fishing, and started to show an interest in rare birds, sending some specimens to the engraver and author Thomas Bewick. He became a keen student of natural history and collector of birds, fish, and other wildlife, and by 1825 he had a substantial collection. He was active in the London learned societies, and held senior posts in several for many years. He was treasurer of the Linnean Society from May 1849, until his death in 1856, vice president of the Zoological Society of London from 1839 to 1851, treasurer of the Royal Entomological Society from 1834 to 1852, and was also on the Council of the Medico-Botanical Society.

He knew many of the leading naturalists of his day, which helped him in the production of his books and articles, notably his 1836 A History of British Fishes and A History of British Birds.

== Approach ==
Yarrell was aware of earlier bird handbooks, especially Bewick's. A History of British Birds used the same title as Bewick's popular book (1797–1804). Its approach, however, was significantly different in the extensiveness of Yarrell's correspondence and in the increased emphasis on scientific accuracy made possible by the rapid advance in ornithological knowledge in the nineteenth century.

=== Correspondence and specimens ===
Yarrell corresponded widely, consulted existing handbooks of birds, and made use of his membership of the Zoological Society of London and the Linnean Society to find out about recent discoveries. He referenced the work of, amongst others, the ornithologists William Macgillivray, John James Audubon, George Montagu, Prideaux John Selby, Leonard Jenyns, John Gould, Temminck, Nicholas Aylward Vigors and Heinrich von Kittlitz. During the six years of writing, with the regular publication of three-sheet instalments of his Birds, many people across Britain and Europe sent him descriptions, observations and specimens for him to include, and the book is full of references to such contributions. Yarrell explicitly states in his Preface that

During these six years many occurrences of rare birds, and of some that were even new to Britain, became known to me, either by the communications of private friends and correspondents, or from the examination of the various periodical works which give publicity to such events. (Note: Yarrell, 1843. Preface, page v.)

In some cases, Yarrell's correspondents and reference books enable him to add an account of a bird's distribution around the world. For the ringed plover, for example, Sven Nilsson speaks for Sweden and the Baltic coast; Mr Hewitson for Norway; Carl Linnaeus for Lapland; a Mr Scoresby for Iceland and Greenland; the zoologist Thomas Pennant for Russia and Siberia; the archaeologist Charles Fellows (Note: Yarrell writes "Mr. Fellowes". Charles Fellows's A Journal written during an Excursion in Asia Minor was published in 1839.) for Asia Minor [Turkey], and Coenraad Jacob Temminck for Japan. (Note: Yarrell, 1843. Volume 2. pp. 402–403.) In the case of the wood sandpiper, Dr. Calvert sent a specimen from Malta; Selby and Dr. Andrew Smith, specimens from South Africa; others from India; Gould "mentions having seen skins" from "Chili and the Islands of the Pacific". (Note: Yarrell, 1843. Volume 2. p. 537.) Yarrell also describes his own observations, in this case with the words "It [the wood sandpiper] is far from being numerous in the localities where I met with it... Although I met with the young in a downy state, and partially feathered, I only obtained one nest with eggs." (Note: Yarrell, 1843. Volume 2. p. 536.)

=== Structure ===
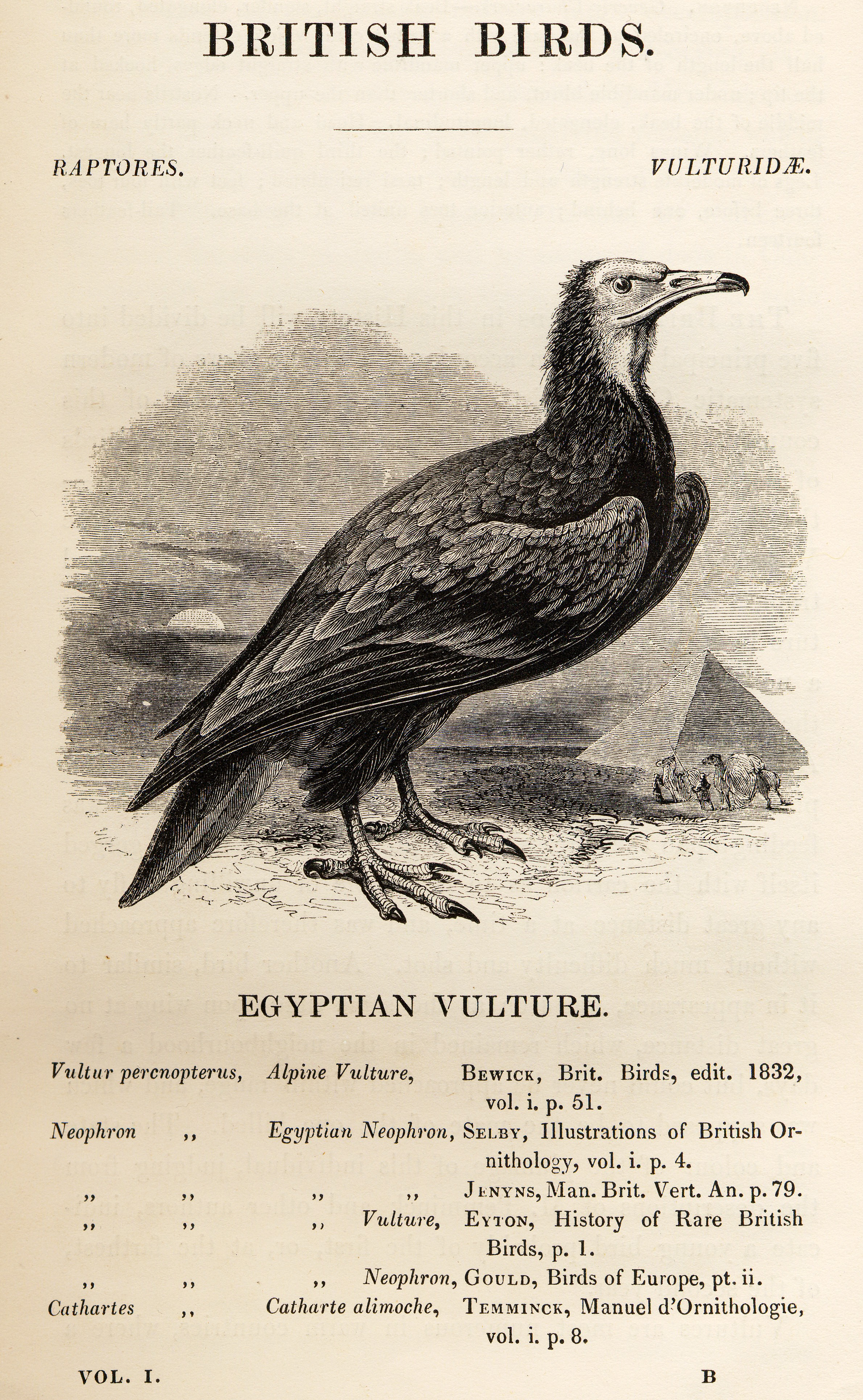
Egyptian vulture, complete with laden camels, pyramid and desert landscape, but also an accurate list of scientific names and authorities

Yarrell broadly follows the lead of Bewick in describing each species in a separate section, with essentially no introduction. The first bird, the Egyptian vulture, is preceded by nothing more than the Index (there is no table of contents) and the heading "British Birds", though there is an introductory paragraph on page 2, inside the Egyptian vulture article. Like Bewick, Yarrell's sections begin with a large wood engraving, depicting the species against a more or less realistic background: that of the Egyptian vulture shows a pyramid and a pair of laden camels. An immediate difference from Bewick is the list of Latin names that follows, with Vultur percnopterus (Bewick), Neophron percnopterus (Selby, Jenyns, Eyton, and Gould), and Cathartes percnopterus (Temminck). This care reflects both the rapidly advancing state of ornithology in the early nineteenth century, and Yarrell's more scientific approach.

The account of the first species of each genus, such as the vulture genus Neophron, includes a paragraph on "Generic Characters", describing the beak, legs, wings and any distinguishing features useful for identification. These features are often small, requiring examination or measurement of specimens in the hand, reflecting the fact, repeated many times in the book, that those interested in birds shot them to collect unusual specimens. The Egyptian vulture was recorded from a specimen in Somerset, England, "now in the possession of the Rev. A. Mathew, (Note: This appears to be the Rev. John Matthew, 30 December 1761 – 10 March 1837, Rector of Kilve with Stringston, Somerset from 1797 until his death.) of Kilve in Somersetshire, [which] was shot near that place in October 1825." The bird was one of a pair, but the other was too wary to be captured. (Note: Yarrell, 1843. p. 2.) Yarrell then proceeds to describe where the bird can be found, its behaviour and diet, and its detailed appearance. The Egyptian vulture takes up six pages, which is typical; the golden eagle gets eight pages, the hobby only four.

Also like Bewick, many articles end with a tail-piece, a small engraving, but here again Yarrell shows himself to be both more serious and less merely decorative than Bewick, with more information to impart. The Egyptian vulture article ends with a large and accurate engraving of another specimen, so the article shows both a young and an old bird, with clearly different plumage which is also described in the text.

=== Descriptions ===
As well as straightforward details of each bird, Yarrell adds many stories, chosen from his own experience, from his correspondents, or from often recently published accounts, to enliven the description of each species according to his taste.

For example, the "Fulmar Petrel" quotes John Macgillivray's article "in a recent number of the Edinburgh New Philosophical Journal", describing a visit to St Kilda in June 1840, for a page and a half. It begins:

This bird exists here in almost incredible numbers, and to the natives is by far the most important of the productions of the island ... [They] daily risk their lives in its pursuit. The Fulmar breeds on the face of the highest precipices, and only on such as are furnished with small grassy shelves, every spot on which, above a few inches in extent, is occupied with one or more of its nests ... The young birds were very clamorous on being handled, and vomited a quantity of clear oil ... which imparts to the whole bird, its nest and young, and even to the rock which it frequents, a peculiar and very disagreeable odour. Fulmar oil is among the most valuable productions of St Kilda. The best is obtained from the old bird. The Fulmar flies with great buoyancy and considerable rapidity, and when at sea is generally seen skimming along the surface of the waves at a slight elevation ...

— Yarrell, "The Fulmar Petrel". (Note: Yarrell, 1843. Volume 3, pp. 498–499, citing John Macgillivray)

Macgillivray is similarly relied upon for accounts of the pink-footed goose and the goosander as far as the Hebrides are concerned. (Note: Yarrell, 1843. Volume 3, pp 67, 293-294.)

As with Bewick, Yarrell is unsentimental about hunting. Landrails or corncrakes "are considered most delicate as articles of food, and in such high estimation, that two Landrails are said to be a present for a queen." But he constantly provides accurate stories that inform and entertain the reader:

Mr Jesse .. says:— A gentleman had a Corn Crake brought to him by his dog, to all appearance quite dead. As it lay on the ground, he turned it over with his foot, and was convinced it was dead. Standing by, however, in silence, he suddenly saw it open an eye. He then took it up; its head fell; its legs hung loose, and it appeared again quite dead. He then put it in his pocket, and before long he felt it all alive, and struggling to escape. He then took it out; it was as lifeless as before. Having laid it again upon the ground and retired to some distance, the bird in about five minutes warily raised its head, looked round, and decamped at full speed.

— Yarrell, "The Landrail". (Note: Yarrell, 1843. Volume 3, p. 9.)

== Observations ==
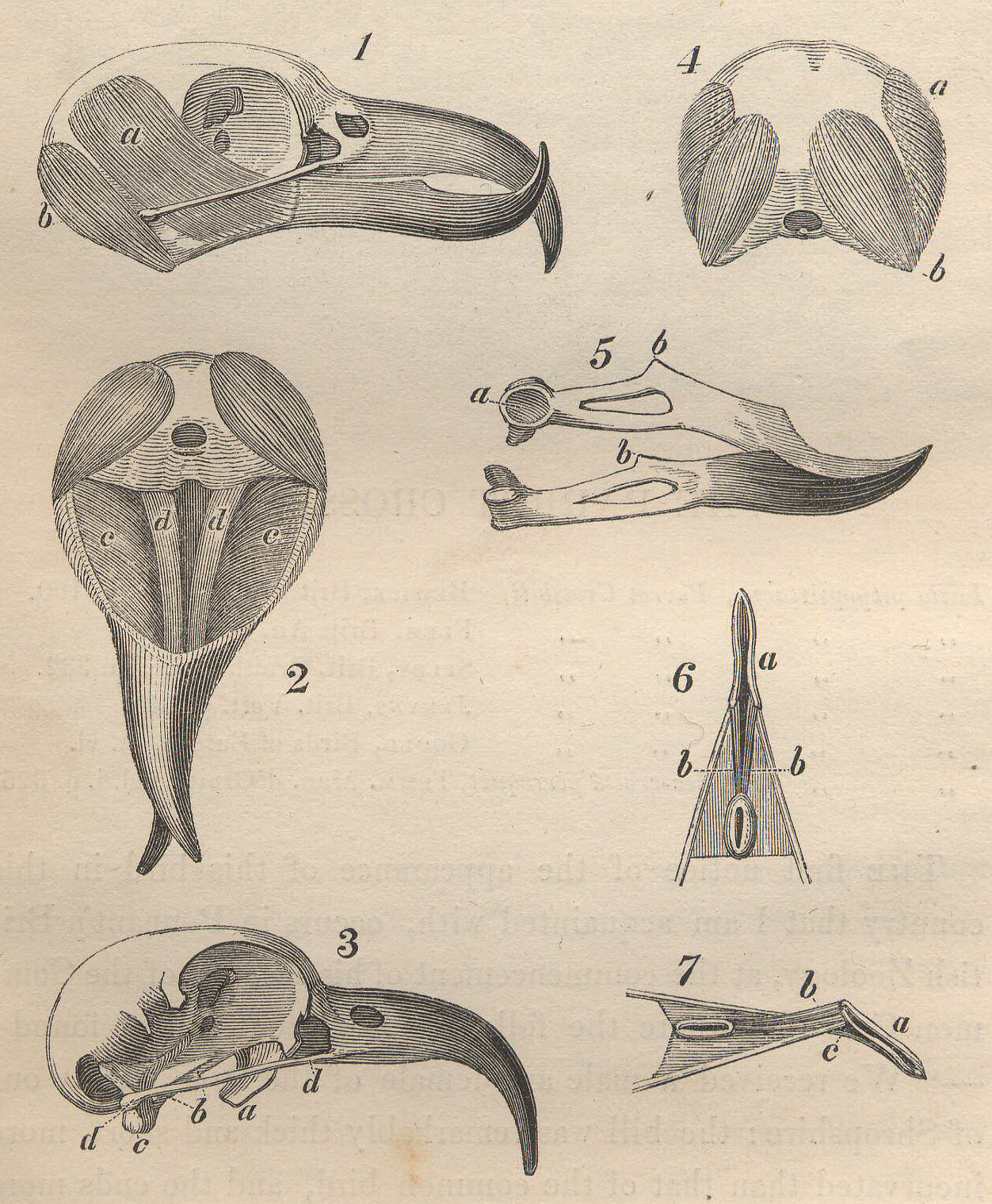
Figures of crossbill (Loxia curvirostra) skull and jaw anatomy

In addition to the work of collating descriptions and commissioning drawings and engravings, Yarrell also made his own scientific observations of certain topics, including the description of the trachea of several species, and a detailed account, occupying seven pages, of the skull, jaw, musculature, and feeding behaviour of the common crossbill, Loxia curvirostra. The article for the crossbill is one of the longest in the book, at 20 pages. Yarrell introduces his special interest in this bird's head as follows:

The peculiar formation and direction of the parts of the beak in the Crossbill, its anomalous appearance, as well as the particular and powerful manner in which it is exercised, had long excited in me a desire to examine the structure of an organ so curious, and the kindness of a friend supplied me with the means.

— Yarrell, "The Common Crossbill". (Note: Yarrell, 1843. Volume 2, p. 27.)

Yarrell at once goes on to explain that the crossbills are unique in making use of "any lateral motion of the mandibles, and it is my object here to describe the bony structure and muscles by which this peculiar and powerful action is obtained." He explains the anatomy and how the jaws are closed, and then how their unique side-to-side motion is achieved:

When the lateral motion is required, the great pyramidal muscle on the right side pulls the extremity of the lower jaw, to which it is attached backwards; the pterygoid muscle of the left side at the same time powerfully assisting by carrying that side of the lower jaw inwards.

— Yarrell, "The Common Crossbill". (Note: Yarrell, 1843. Volume 2, p. 30.)

He then quotes a Mr. Townson's account of how crossbills feed on pine cones, inserting their beaks between the scales and then forcing them sideways, opening the cone. Yarrell then immediately returns to anatomy, describing in detail (nearly a page) how the tongue is used to extract the seed from between the cone scales. Only then does he return to Mr. Townson, quoting him as saying "The degree of the lateral power is surprising, and they are fond of exercising it for amusement; they are, therefore, not a little mischievous. My pets would often come to my table whilst I was writing, and carry off my pencils ... and tear them to pieces in a minute." Yarrell then adds an observation of his own, and contradicts an opinion of a famous scientist: "Notwithstanding Buffon's assertion to the contrary, they can pick up and eat the smallest seeds ... so perfect and useful is this singular instrument." He goes on to criticise Buffon's description of the crossbill's beak as "an error and defect of Nature, and a useless deformity" as "an erroneous and hasty conclusion". Yarrell concludes by writing "I have never met with a more interesting, or more beautiful example, of the adaptation of means to an end, than is to be found in the beak, the tongue, and their muscles, in the Crossbill". (Note: Yarrell, 1843. Volume 2, pp. 30–32.)

== Illustrations ==
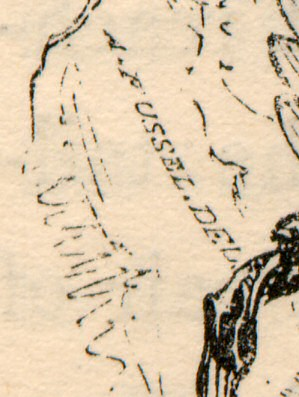
Alexander Fussell's signature on his drawing of the snowy owl

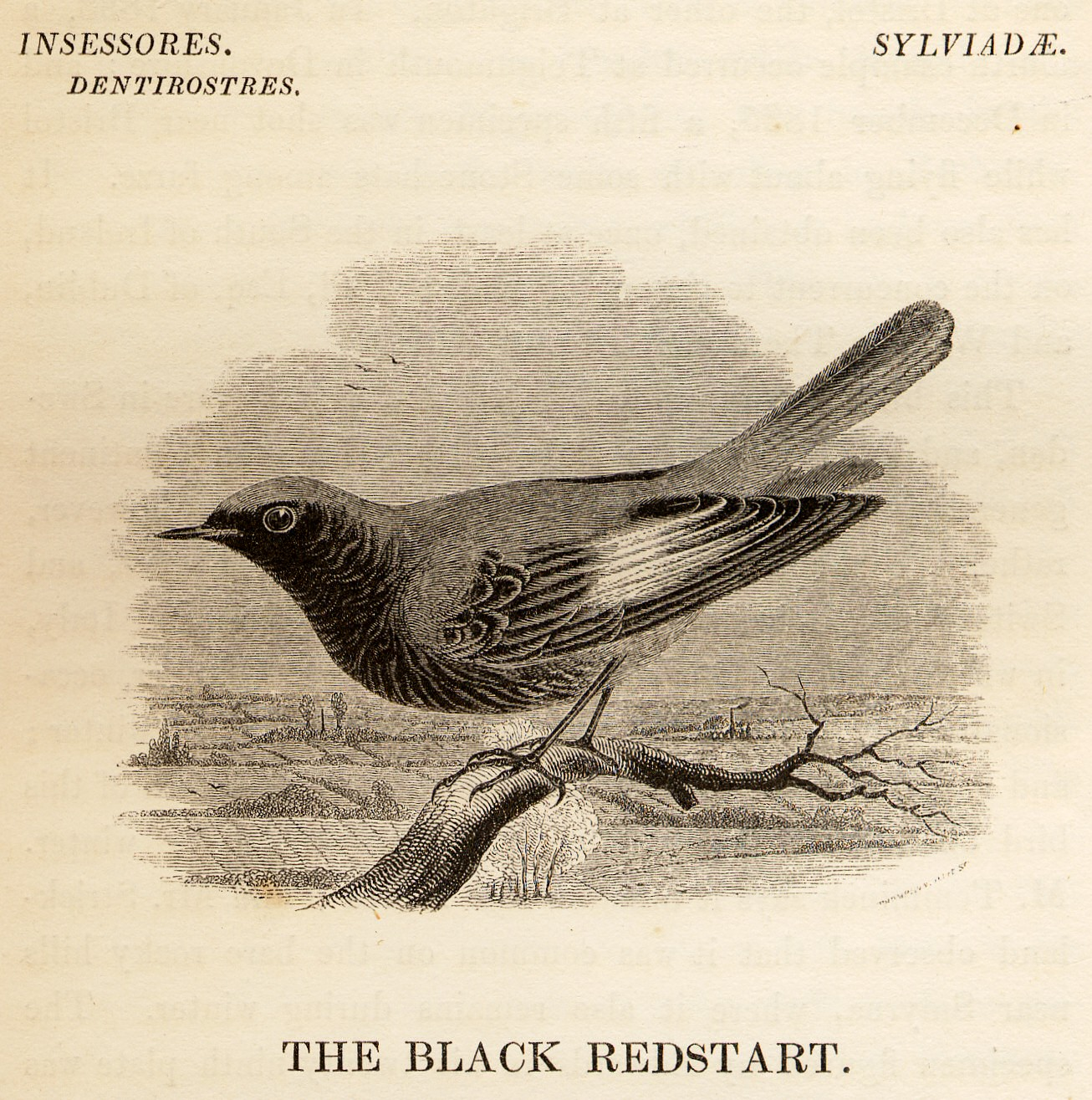
John Thompson's drawing and engraving of the black redstart

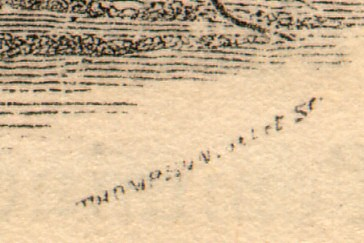
Rare signature "Thompson Del et Sc" on his work, the black redstart

Yarrell's illustrations were wood engravings made using the techniques pioneered by Bewick in which boxwood blocks were engraved on their ends using a burin, a tool with a V-shaped tip. The most expensive part of producing illustrated books in the nineteenth century was the hand colouring of printed plates, mainly by young women. By using monochrome illustrations Yarrell could avoid this outlay and the associated costs of having the illustrations separate from the text and printed on a different grade of paper.

Alexander Fussell created most of the drawings for the book. Yarrell thanks Fussell in his Preface for "nearly five hundred of the drawings on wood here employed", and John Thompson (1785–1866) and his sons (Note: Yarrell may well be referring here to John Thompson's elder son Charles Thurston Thompson, and his younger brother Charles Thompson, both of whom were skilled engravers. John's other son Richard does not appear to have been an engraver.) for the "very long series of engravings" of the drawings. He also thanks his printers, Messrs. Bentley, Wilson and Fley for their care and skill. The pen for the remaining drawings, if any (the title page asserts there are 520 in the book), is not stated. (Note: Yarrell, 1843. pp. v-xii) As well as the figures of birds, there are 59 tail-pieces (following Bewick, small woodcuts to fill in the spaces at ends of articles), of which some are whimsical, like Bewick's, but many illustrate anatomical details, especially breastbones and windpipes, and others, although decorative, realistically depict aspects of bird behaviour or human interaction with birds. For example, the tail-piece for the "Jack Snipe" shows a bittern among reeds, swallowing a frog, while that for the "Common Bittern" shows "a mode of shooting an Eagle from a pit".

Fussell's work began in 1837 and continued for six years. Many of the drawings were from skins or stuffed specimens, though every bird species is illustrated with a lifelike drawing of the bird standing (or rarely, flying or swimming) in a natural setting. Additional drawings depict nests, feathers, and details of bird anatomy including feet, breastbones, and windpipes. Simon Holloway suggests that Fussell and the engravers Charles Thompson and sons probably made all the illustrations for the first three editions of Yarrell's Birds. Only in the fourth, rewritten edition of 1871–85 were illustrations by other artists (Charles Whymper, J. G. Keulemans, Edward Neale) added. Some of the bird figures, such as "The Snowy Owl" and "Richard's Pipit" in Volume 1, are signed "A. FUSSEL DEL." (A. Fussel (Note: His name is variously spelt Fussell or Fussel in the literature. Yarrell named him Fussell in the preface.) drew this), but most are entirely unsigned. Some few, such as "The Black Redstart" and "The Common Cuckoo", are signed "THOMPSON DEL ET SC." (Thompson drew and cut this), so in these cases Fussell was not involved. (Note: "The Bee-Eater" is signed "J.T.DEL.ET.SC.")

The quality of the illustrations in Yarrell's books was very high, because he could afford to employ Thompson and his sons. Thompson senior was later to win a médaille d'or at the 1855 Paris Exhibition.

== Contents ==
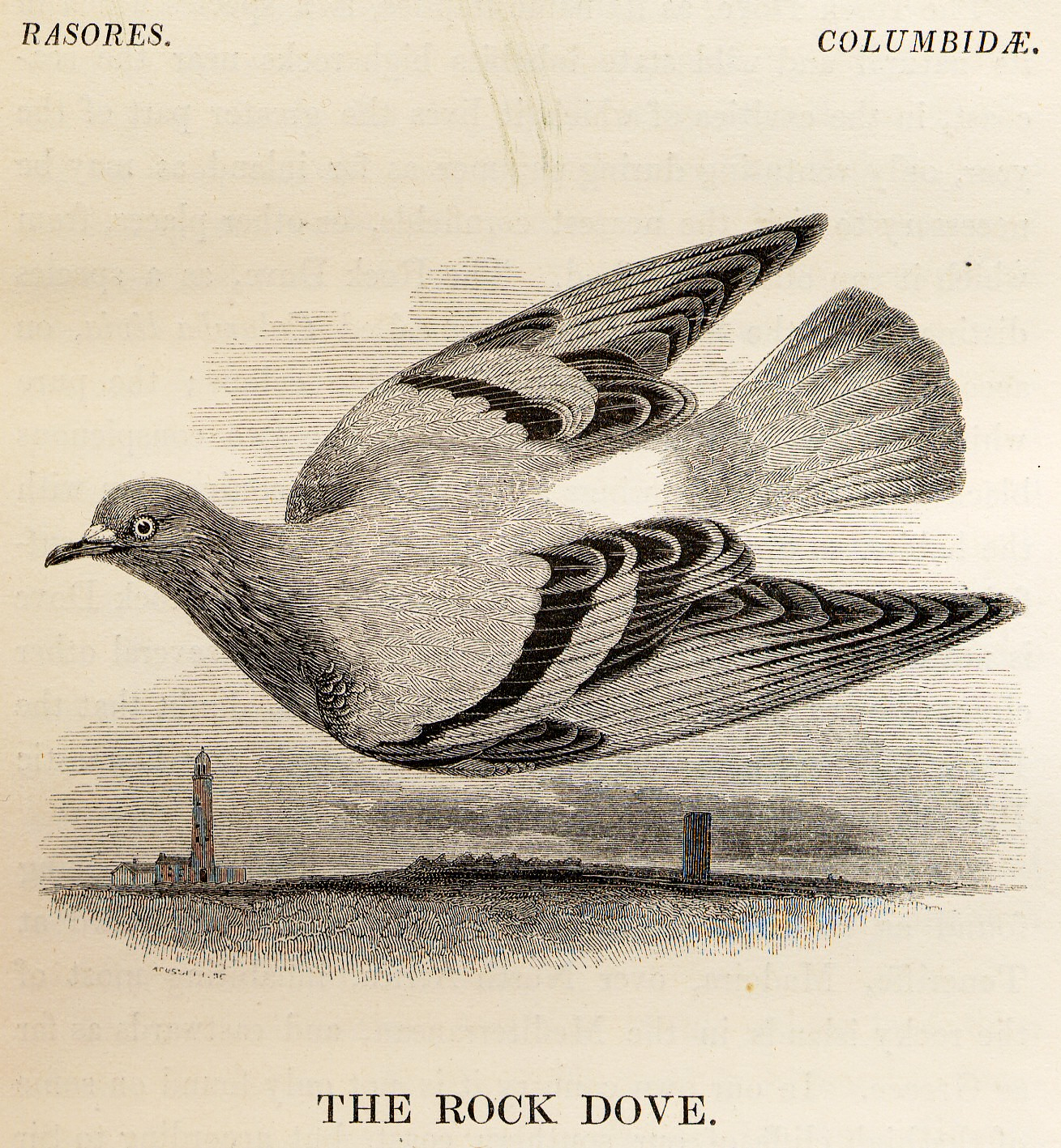
Rock dove, one of the few birds pictured as if in flight

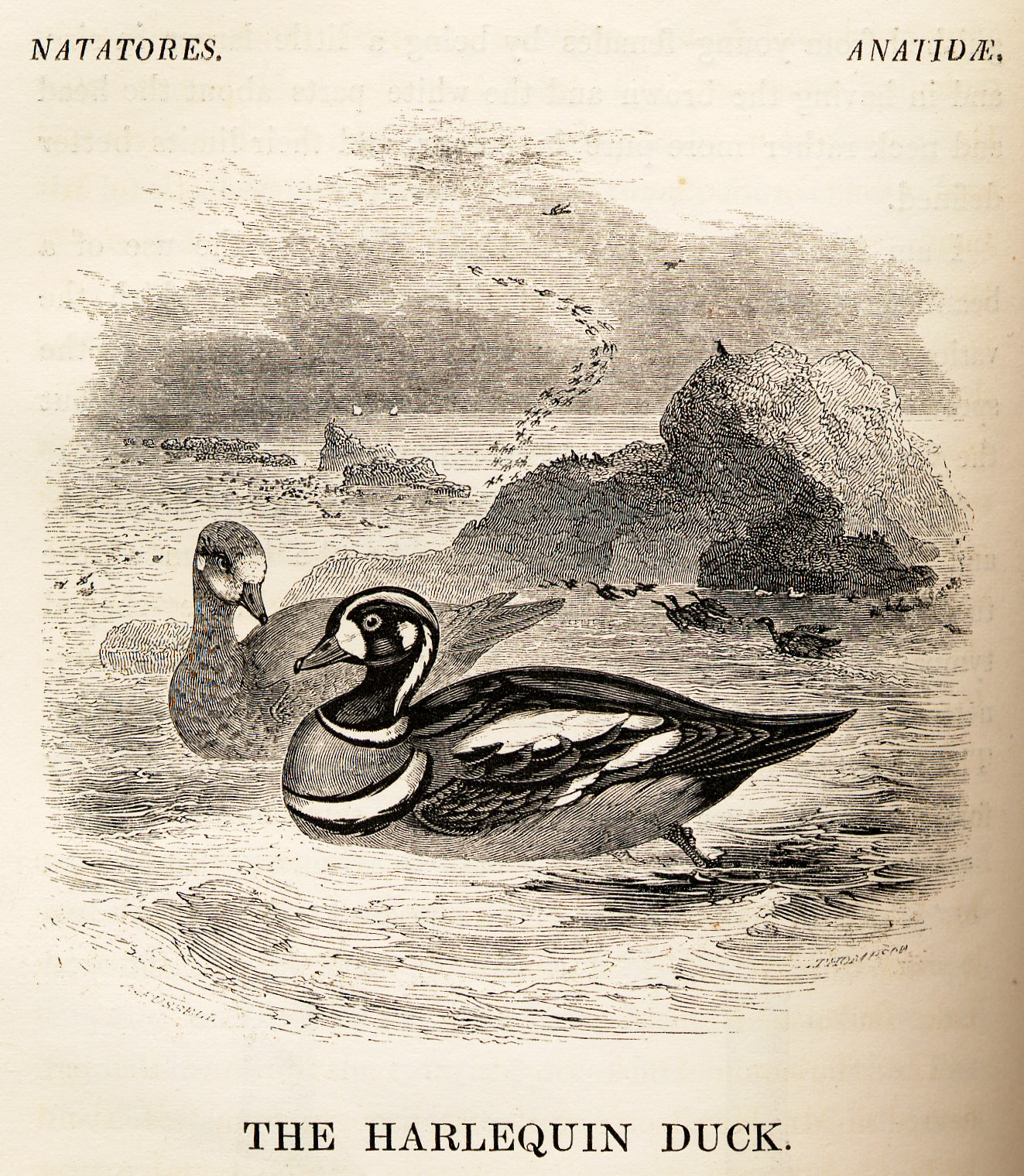
Harlequin duck, one of the few birds pictured swimming

The first edition was organised as follows into four "Orders" of birds. These do not correspond exactly with later taxonomy of the class.

=== Volume 1 ===
- Preface (pages v-xii)
- Index (pages xiii-xxxii)
- Raptores [Raptors] (Egyptian Vulture - Tengmalm's Owl)
- Insessores [Perchers] (Great Grey Shrike - Mountain Linnet, or Twite)

=== Volume 2 ===
- Insessores (continued, Bullfinch - Nightjar)
- Rasores (The Ring Dove, or Wood Pigeon - Little Bustard)
- Grallatores [Waders] (Cream-coloured Courser - Purple Sandpiper)

=== Volume 3 ===
- Grallatores (continued, Collared Pratincole - Red-necked Phalarope)
- Natatores [Swimmers] (Grey-legged Goose - Storm Petrel)

== Reception ==
Contemporaries enjoyed Yarrell's Birds, which sold well through various editions. In The Birds of Shakespeare (1871), James Edmund Harting notes that "an excellent dissertation on the organ of voice in the raven will be found in the second volume of Yarrell's 'British Birds'", and Harting refers to Yarrell when he needs ornithological facts.

Thomas R. Forbes, in his biographical paper on Yarrell, writes that "All [editions of Birds] are outstanding because of the author's clear, narrative style, accuracy, careful scholarship, and unassuming charm."

Simon Holloway, in his Historical Atlas of Breeding Birds in Britain and Ireland 1875–1900, writes that Yarrell's Birds was "far more thoroughly dealt with than in Bewick's work and, once again, was liberally illustrated with wood-engravings". He adds that the book was "also hugely influential in its day", being "reasonably cheap", and that it was the book that the future authors of "the county avifaunas were bought as children and remained their standard textbook", i.e. that Yarrell influenced a whole generation of ornithological authors in Britain. Holloway used Yarrell's figures to accompany the account of each species of bird in his Historical Atlas.

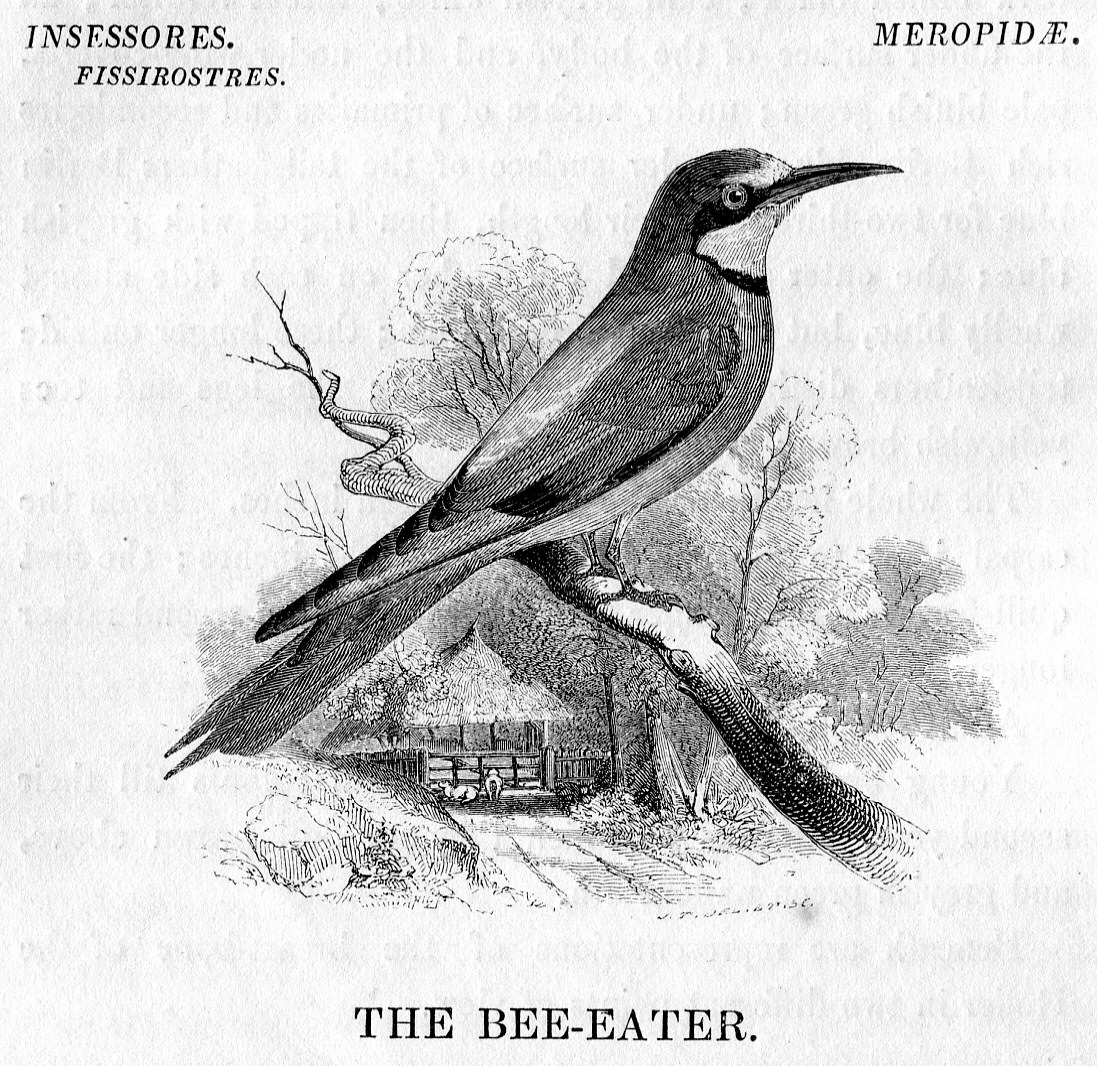
"The Bee-Eater", drawn and engraved by John Thompson. Yarrell's plates, unlike those of many other books, were never hand-coloured, so the European bee-eater's glowing coloration could be presented only in words.

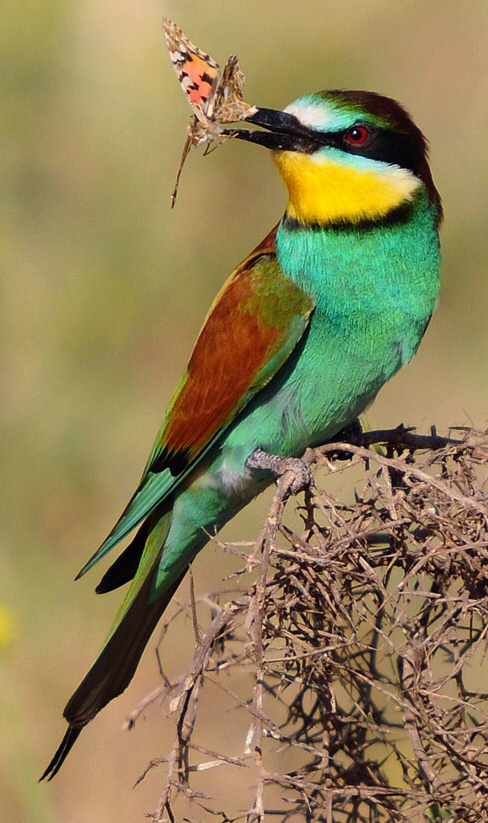
Yarrell described the bee-eater's colours with words like reddish brown, saffron yellow, greenish blue, bluish green, duck green and verdigris green. (Vol. II, page 204)

The Soffer Ornithology Collection at Amherst College observes that "Yarrell's History was the standard illustrated British bird book of the 19th century and one of the historically great ornithological works. In well chosen prose, Yarrell provides synonymy, generic characters, a description with measurements, local and general distribution and a life history including nidification and eggs and arrival and departure times for each species. The wood engraved text figures have never been surpassed using this technique in terms of accuracy and artistic merit." Soffer suggests that the "fourth edition is perhaps the best, embellished as it is by contributions from Alfred Newton and Howard Saunders".

In Ornithology in Scotland, Yarrell's Birds is described as "written by an Englishman and illustrated in a manner calculated to attract the non-scientific ornithologist right at the opening of the era of the great Victorian naturalists". It eclipsed the unfortunate MacGillivray, whose British Birds in contrast "never achieved real popularity", partly because it was illustrated strictly technically, and partly because it appeared at the same time as the first part of Yarrell's work.

The bookseller Isabelline Books argues that "Yarrell's History [of British Birds] probably contains the richest collection of colour descriptions in any bird book in the English language", with "various parts of the Bee-Eater described as verditer blue, saffron-yellow, chestnut, duck-green, verdigris-green, buff, greyish-brown and fawn colour. The Roller as berlin-blue, brownish-yellow, coppery-purple and light cinnamon. The Spotted Eagle as chocolate-brown, pale wood-brown and reddish liver-brown. The Golden Oriole had lead-colour toes, other parts oil-green, brocoli-brown and wine-yellow. The Cuneate-Tailed Gull was smoke-brown and pearl-grey, the Turnstone had ferruginus portions, the Little Auk was livid-brown and sooty-brown, while the American Bittern was leaden-brown. The variations in these terms seems to be inexhaustable. They can now be considered a curiousity [sic], somewhat romantic or just pure pedantry on the author's part. But it was a serious attempt to try to define quite subtle colourings."

== In culture ==
Yarrell's Birds was mentioned in a well-known letter to The Times in 1913, when a Fellow of the Royal Society, the naturalist and paleontologist Richard Lydekker, wrote on 6 February that he had heard a cuckoo, explaining that though contrary to Yarrell's statement that records of the bird calling as early as March "must be treated with suspicion, if not with incredulity", it was a definite fact. Six days later on 12 February 1913, Lydekker wrote again, confessing that "the note was uttered by a bricklayer's labourer". Letters about the first cuckoo became a tradition in the newspaper.

== Editions ==
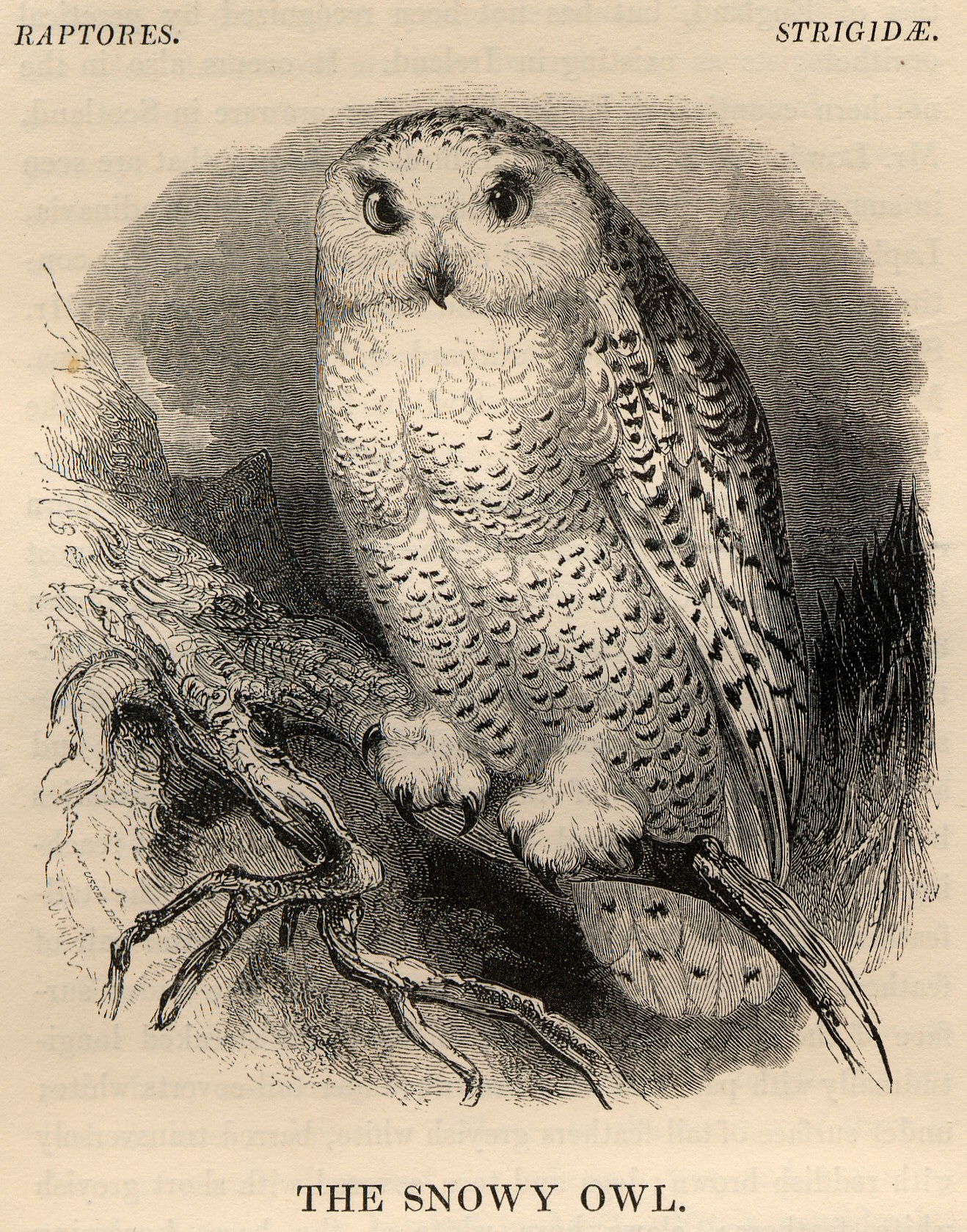
Wood engraving of snowy owl. Drawn by Alexander Fussell and engraved on to boxwood by John Thompson.

Birds was first published "in thirty-seven parts of three sheets each, at intervals of two months; the first Part was issued in July 1837, and the last in May 1843." (Note: The 3 volumes contain 1725 pages (not counting Preface and Index which cannot have been in the 37 parts). 27 species are listed in the Preface as having been added later, so at about 4 pages per species, deduct 108 leaving about 1617 pages issued in parts. These were issued on 3 x 37 sheets = 111 sheets in all. So there were at least 1617 ÷ 111 = 14.5 pages per sheet. Each printer's sheet must have contained 16 pages, 8 per side, with 8 of the pages printed upside-down, so that when folded they formed a booklet.) The sheets were then collected into three volumes, with the addition of "many occurrences of rare birds, and of some that were even new to Britain". The additional birds were listed and briefly described in the Preface, and "the new subjects have been engraved on single leaves, so paged, that the bookbinder may insert these separate leaves among the birds of the genus to which each respectively belongs."

The book came out in three different formats. The smallest is "octavo"; the two "large paper" formats are "royal octavo" and "imperial octavo". A supplement appeared in 1845; it was bound into the third volume of the rare "imperial octavo" edition of 1845, of which only 50 copies were printed.

The fourth edition was revised and extended by the ornithologists Alfred Newton and Howard Saunders, with some additional illustrations bringing the total number of engravings up to 564.

- First edition, 1843. 3 volumes. John Van Voorst, London. (with a supplement to the first edition, 1845).
- Second edition, 1845.
- Third edition, 1856.
- Fourth edition, 4 volumes. I, 1871–1874. II, 1876–1882. III, 1882–1884. IV, 1884–1885. Vol. I and II edited by Alfred Newton; Vol. III and IV edited by Howard Saunders.

== Tail-pieces ==
Yarrell's tail-pieces, small engravings fitted into spaces at the ends of articles, follow the tradition established by Bewick, but differ in rarely being whimsical. Many are secondary illustrations showing details of bird anatomy or features useful in identification.

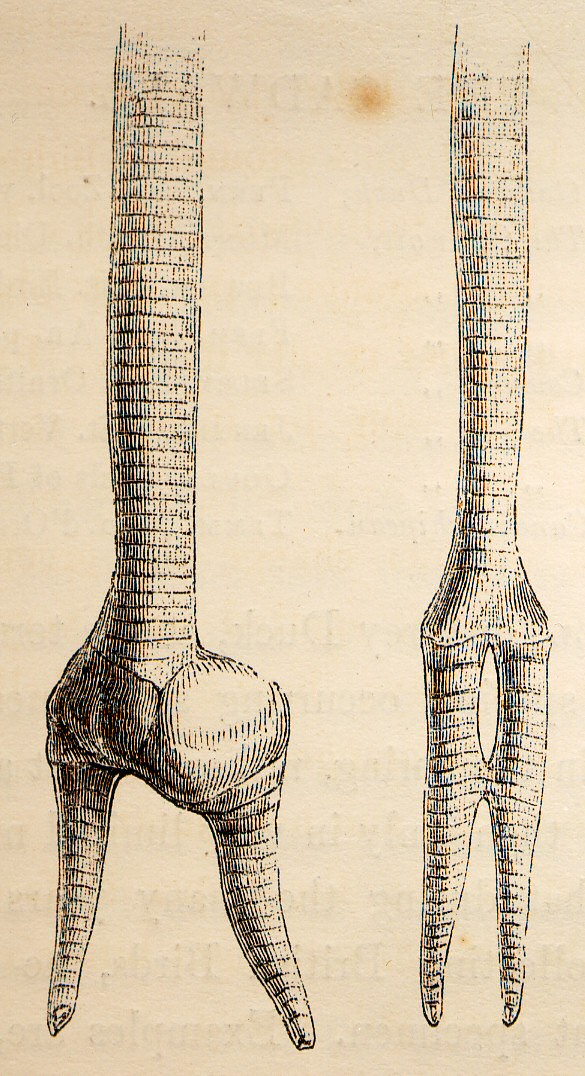
Tracheae and bronchial tubes of male and female shoveler ducks

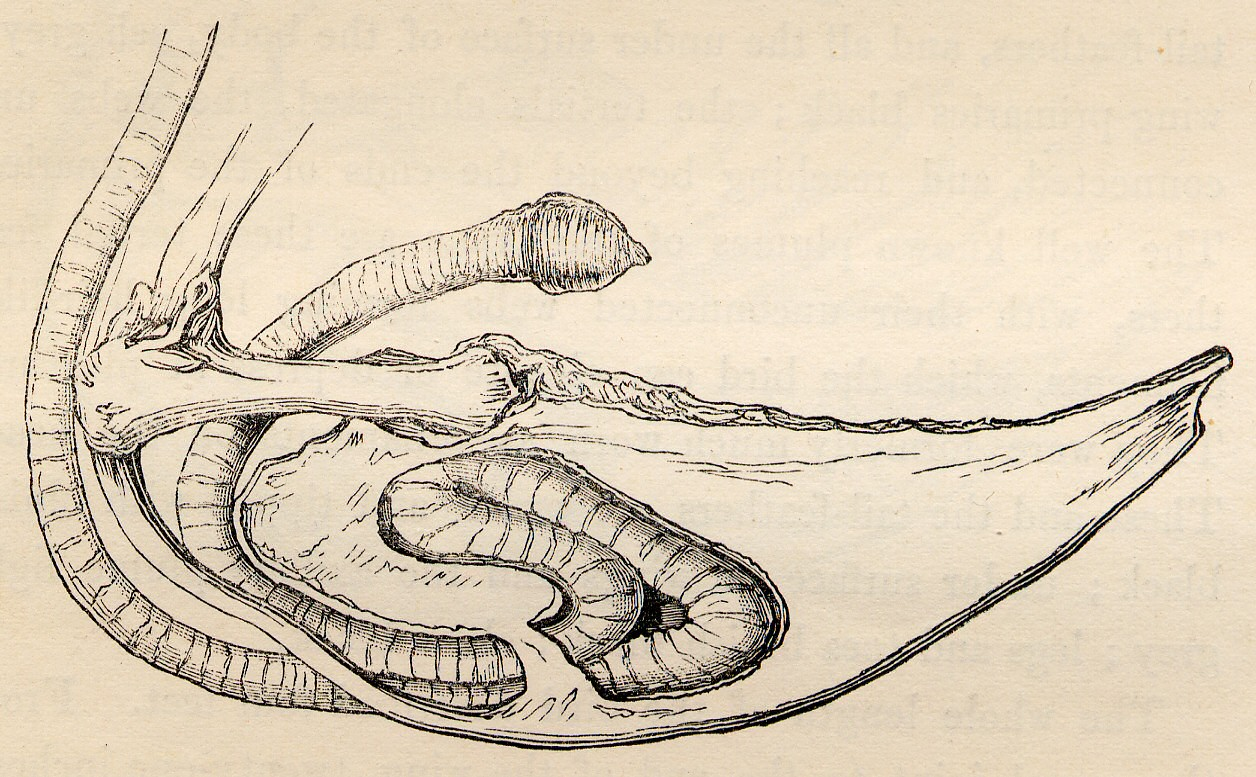
Sternum and trachea of a young male crane

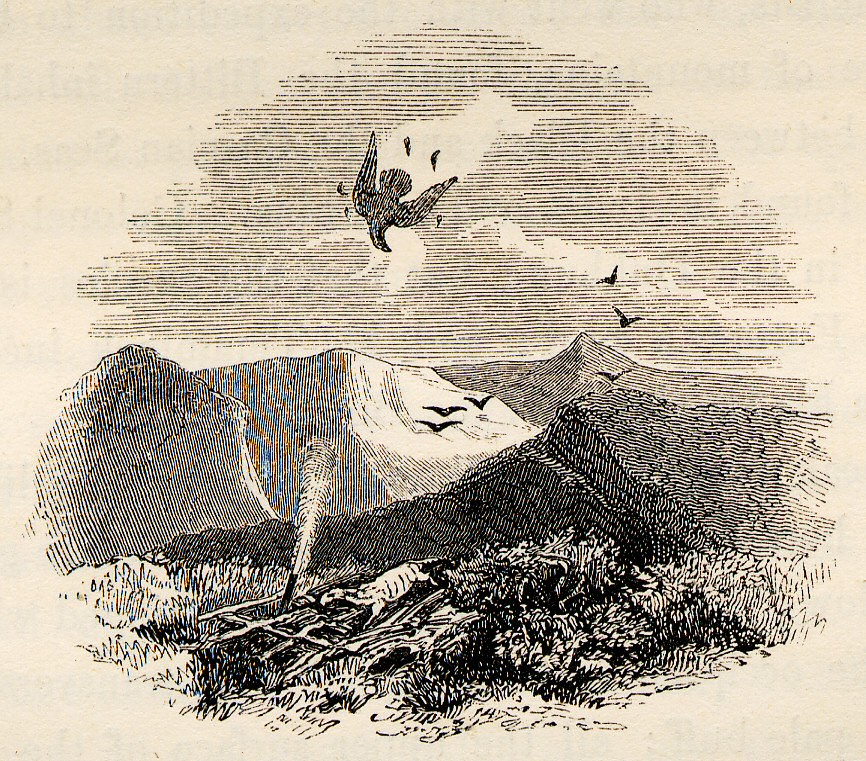
Tail-piece vignette showing "a mode of shooting an Eagle from a pit"

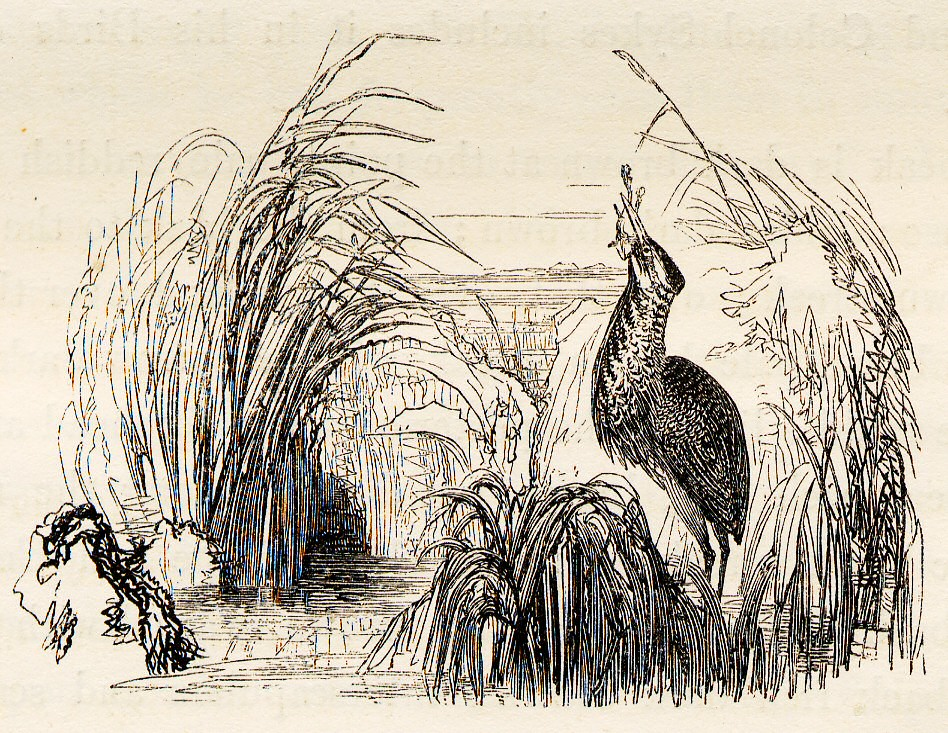
Tail-piece of bittern swallowing a frog

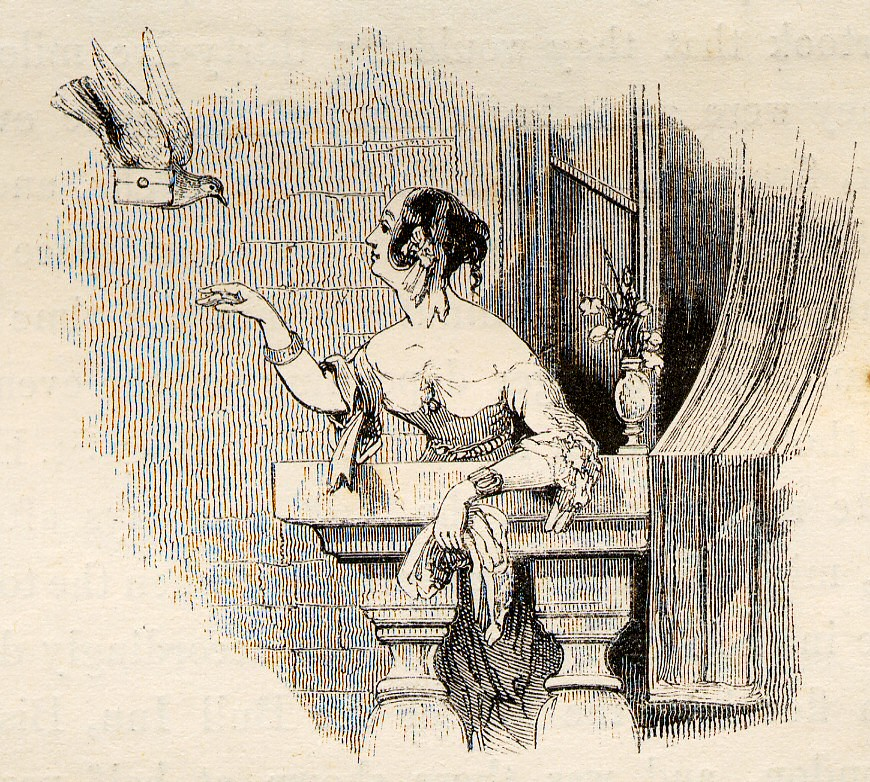
Whimsical tail-piece of a lady receiving her pigeon post

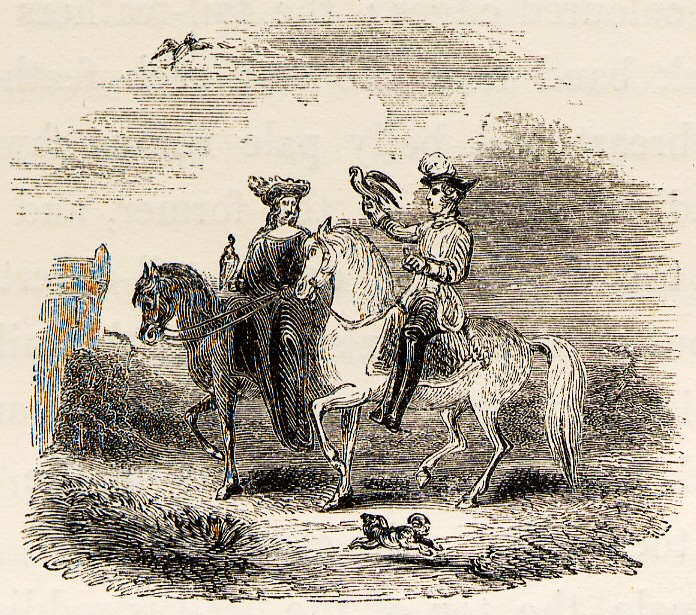
Whimsical tail-piece of mediaeval lady and gentleman on horseback with falcons

== See also ==
- A History of British Birds

== Cited texts ==
- Jackson, Christine E. (2022). A Newsworthy Naturalist: The Life of William Yarrell. Oxford: John Beaufoy. ISBN 978-1913679-04-0.
- McGhie, Henry A. (2017). Henry Dresser and Victorian Ornithology: Birds, Books and Business. Manchester: Manchester University Press. ISBN 978-1-78499-413-6.
