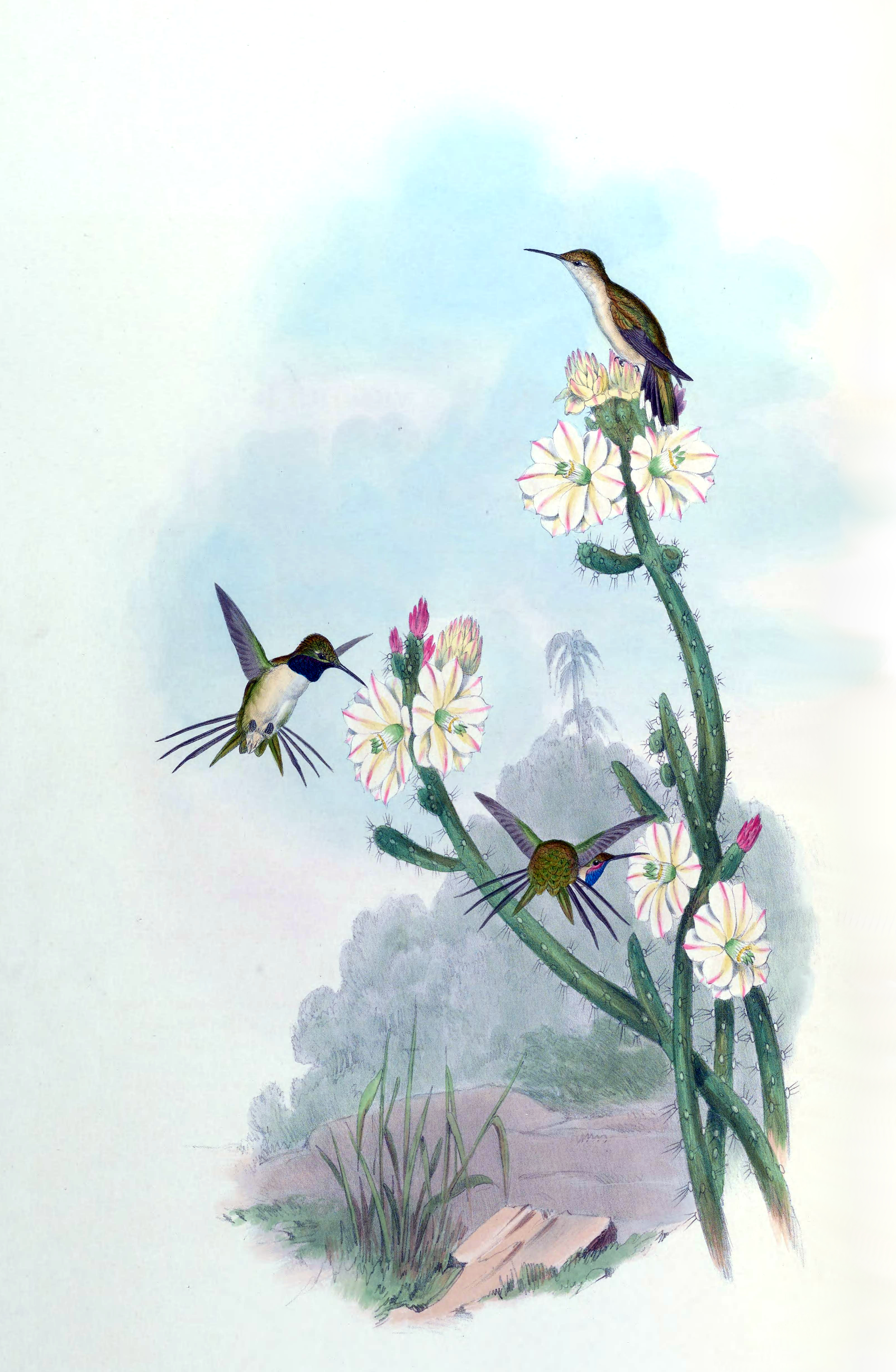

Conservation status
- Critically Endangered (IUCN 3.1)
- CITES Appendix II

Scientific classification
- Kingdom: Animalia
- Phylum: Chordata
- Class: Aves
- Order: Apodiformes
- Family: Trochilidae
- Tribe: Mellisugini
- Genus: Eulidia; Mulsant, 1877
- Species: E. yarrellii

Binomial name
- Eulidia yarrellii (Bourcier, 1847)

Synonyms
- Myrtis yarrellii

= Chilean woodstar =

Species of hummingbird

The Chilean woodstar (Eulidia yarrellii) is a Critically Endangered species of hummingbird in tribe Mellisugini of subfamily Trochilinae, the "bee hummingbirds". It is the only species placed in the genus Eulidia. It is endemic to Chile though there are unconfirmed reports from southern Peru. The species' name commemorates the English naturalist William Yarrell.

== Taxonomy and systematics ==
The Chilean woodstar has at times been placed in genus Myrtis with the purple-collared woodstar (M. fanny) but that treatment has little current (2022) support. The species is the only one in its genus and has no subspecies.

== Description ==
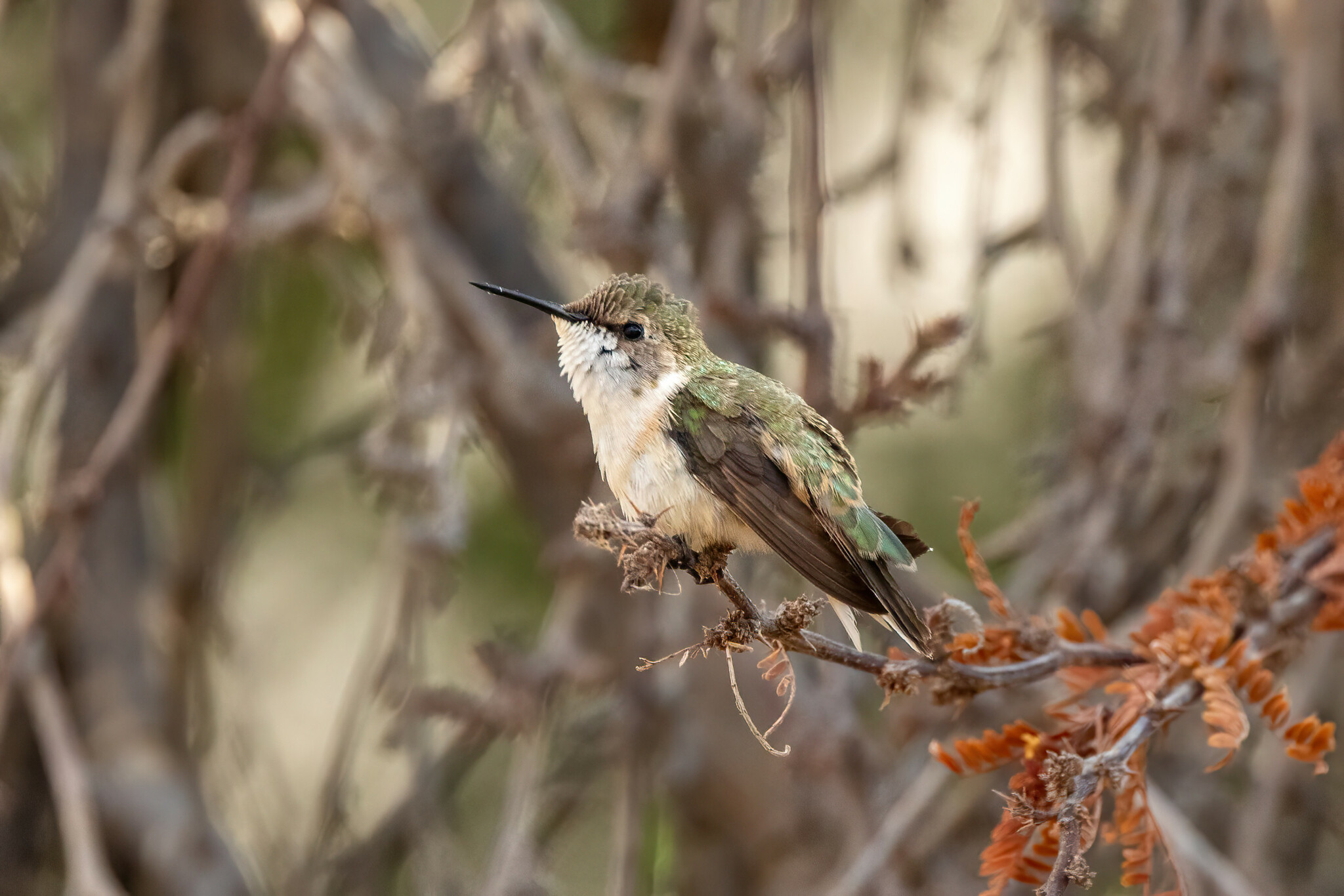
The Chilean woodstar in Chilean woods

The Chilean woodstar is 7.5 to 8.0 cm (3.0 to 3.1 in) long and weighs 2.3 to 2.6 g (0.081 to 0.092 oz). It is the smallest bird in Chile. Both sexes have a short black bill. The adult male is iridescent olive green above and white below. Its gorget is reddish-purple and blue, but often appears blackish. The central tail feathers are very short and green; the outer ones are longer, blackish brown, and curve inward. Females are also olive green above but are mostly very pale buff below, darkest on the belly and thighs. Their tail is short and slightly graduated with green central feathers; the outer ones are black with buff bases and wide white tips. Immature males are similar to the female, but have a mottled throat and may have elongated outer tail feathers.

The Peruvian sheartail (Thaumastura cora), which shares the Chilean woodstar's range and outnumbers it there, is very similar to the Chilean woodstar. However, the male sheartail has two elongated white feathers in its tail, while the female tends to have a whiter belly and a more buff throat than the woodstar. In contrast to the sheartail, the woodstar usually flies with its tail cocked and seldom pumps its tail.

== Distribution and habitat ==
The Chilean woodstar is now (2022) known only from the Lluta, Azapa, and Vitor valleys of far northern Chile's Arica and Parinacota Region. There is an historical record further south in Antofagasta Province. There are also undocumented sight records in Peru in the Tacna Region and possibly Moquegua Region; the South American Classification Committee of the American Ornithological Society considers the species "hypothetical" in that country.

The Chilean woodstar inhabits scrub, thickets, and gardens along river valleys of the arid Arica area. In elevation it generally ranges between 200 and 750 m (660 and 2,500 ft). It is most common below 400 m (1,300 ft) but there is a small population at around 1,800 m (5,900 ft) in the Vitor Valley and there are single records as high as 3,000 m (9,800 ft).

== Behavior ==
=== Movement ===
The Chilean woodstar is believed to be mostly sedentary. However, the records up to 3000 m suggest that they make elevational migrations, and further suggest that continuous vegetation along the river valleys is necessary for those movements.

=== Feeding ===
The Chilean woodstar feeds on nectar from a variety of native and introduced flowers, shubs, cacti, and trees. Native plants include Inga feulles, Geoffroea decorticans, and Schinus molle. Examples of introduced nectar sources are Lantana, Hibiscus and Citrus species. It tends to forage alone, but there are historical records of large numbers feeding at flowering trees. In addition to nectar, the woodstar feeds on small insects such as Hymenoptera, Homoptera and Coleoptera that it catches on the wing.

=== Breeding ===
There are Chilean woodstar nesting records from May, August, and September. Those and the dates that juveniles and incomplete nests have been recorded suggest that the species nests twice a year or perhaps at any time of year. Most of the documented nests have been in olive trees (Olea europaea) at heights around 2.3 m (7.5 ft) above the ground. A few have been found in native shrubs and ornamental trees. Nothing else is known about the species' breeding phenology.

=== Vocalization ===
The Chilean woodstar's call is a series of rasping "tsick" notes, quieter and "less musical" than the call of the Peruvian sheartail. The male has a high-pitched, buzzing "zrrrrrrr" display call.

== Status and conservation ==
The IUCN originally assessed the Chilean woodstar in 1988 as Threatened. It was progressively moved through classifications of greater peril until being declared Critically Endangered in 2014, where it remains. It has a greatly restricted area of occupancy of about 6,220 km^{2} (2,400 sq mi) and an estimated population of only 210 mature individuals or about 300 total. It was very common in the early 20th century and even by the 1980s more than 100 could be seen feeding in a single tree. The population has hugely declined since then, with estimates of 1500 individuals in 2003, 1200 in 2007, and 500 in 2012.

Habitat loss is the main threat to the Chilean woodstar, with only small patches of suitable native vegetation remaining due to increased conversion to agriculture. The effect of pesticides and competition with the Peruvian sheartail are possible threats, but this has not yet been proven. Hybridization with the much more numerous sheartail is another potential threat. A species recovery plan was approved in 2004 which included plans for monitoring the population, restoring natural vegetation, studying competition with the Peruvian sheartail, and the possibility of reintroducing the birds in areas of their former range.
