= Alexander Fussell =

English painter

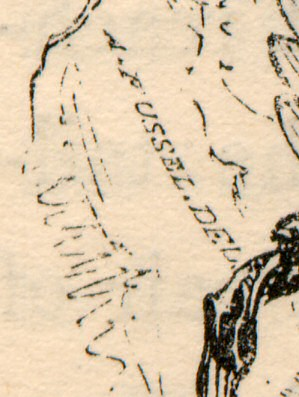
"A. Fussel" signature on drawing in William Yarrell's influential History of British Birds, 1843. (Enlarged detail, lower left of Snowy Owl)

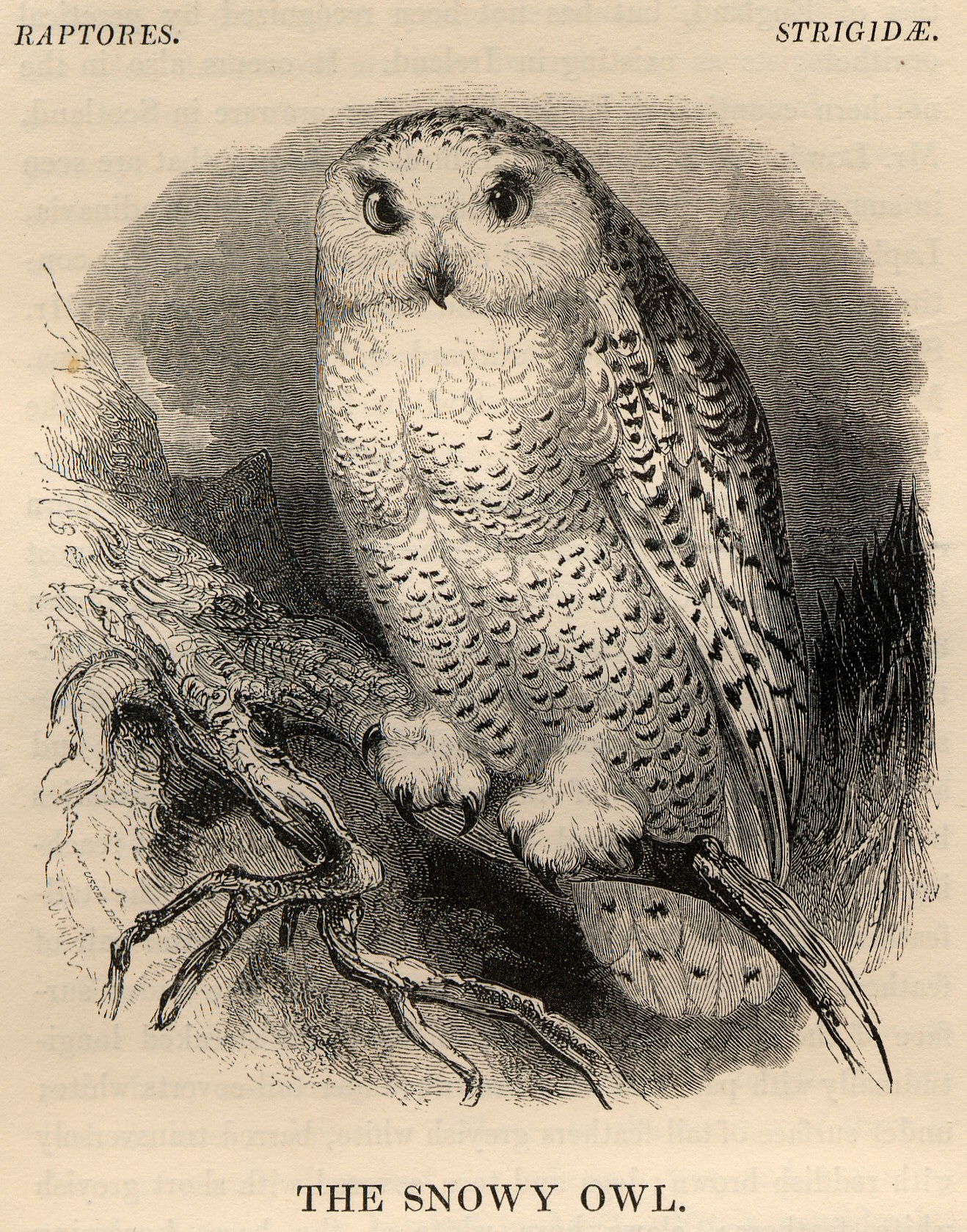
Snowy Owl: one of about 500 drawings by Fussell for Yarrell's Birds

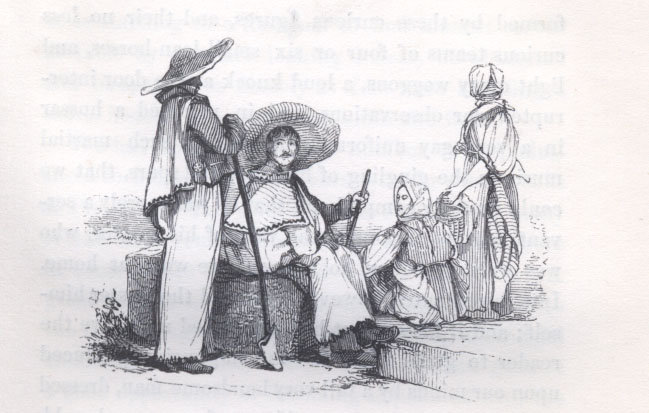
"Sclavack Peasants" from John Paget's Hungary and Transylvania, John Murray, London, 1839. Original drawing by Mr Hering. Transferred to wood by Alexander Fussel. Engraved by Orrin Smith.

Alexander Fussell or Fussel (c. 1814 – 1881) was an English artist and illustrator. He drew the bird illustrations for William Yarrell's 1843 History of British Birds.

== Life and career ==
Fussell painted in various media, including watercolour, gouache, and oil on canvas. His subjects included The prize calf, The park sweeper, Uncle Toby and the Widow Wadman, and The letter, after Thomas Faed.

Fussell undertook the large task of illustrating William Yarrell's 1843 History of British Birds. Yarrell states that Fussell drew "nearly five hundred" of the 520 wood-engravings mentioned on the book's title-page. The work began in 1837 and continued for six years, Yarrell publishing at the rate of one instalment, containing three sheets, every two months. Many of the drawings were from skins or stuffed specimens, though every bird species is illustrated with a lifelike drawing of the bird standing (or rarely, flying or swimming) in a natural setting. Additional drawings depict nests, feathers, and details of bird anatomy including feet, breastbones, and windpipes. The work was hugely influential.

According to The New York Times of 1888, Fussell contributed to the illustration of another famous book, Isaac Walton's Compleat Angler, the fourth edition published by John Major in London in 1844. Paintings of fish by Abraham Cooper and W. Smith were transferred manually to the woodblocks before cutting. Fussell did the drawings, which were then wood-engraved by John Jackson and Mason Jackson.

Fussell "transferred Mr. Hering's sketches to the wood" for John Paget's 1839 Hungary and Transylvania, a book with "numerous illustrations" (47 are listed) of buildings, landscapes, curiosities and peasants.

== Works ==
- Yarrell, William. History of British Birds (nearly 500 drawings), 1843.
- Uncle Toby and the widow Wadman, 1857. (illustrating a scene from Laurence Sterne's Tristram Shandy)
- Paget, John. Hungary and Transylvania; with remarks on their condition, social, political, and economical. John Murray, 1839.
