= William Yarrell =

English zoologist, writer and naturalist (1784–1867)

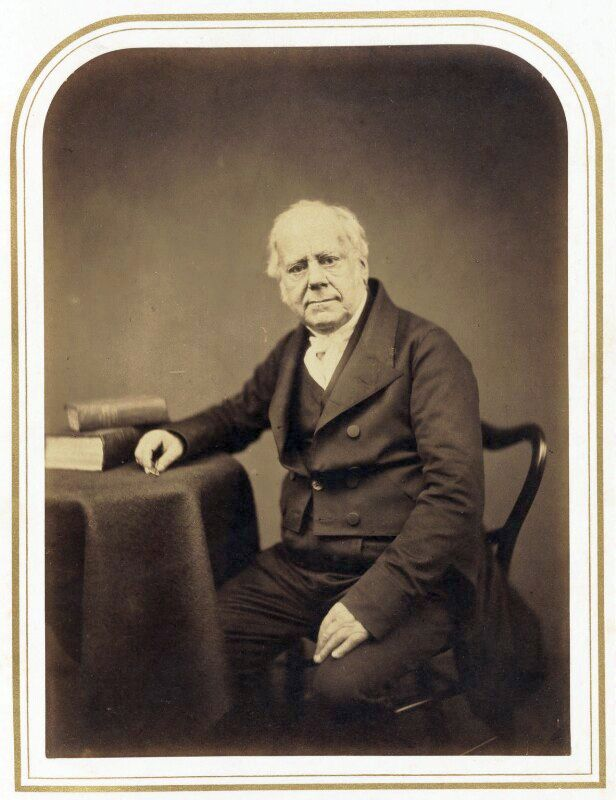
- William Yarrell by Maull & Polyblank, (albumen print arched top, 1855)
- Born: 3 June 1784; Westminster, London, England
- Died: 1 September 1856 (aged 72); Great Yarmouth, Norfolk, England
- Known for: A History of British Birds, 1843
- Scientific career
- Fields: Zoology, ornithology
- Author abbrev. (zoology): Yarrell

William Yarrell (3 June 1784 – 1 September 1856) was an English zoologist, prolific writer, bookseller and naturalist admired by his contemporaries for his precise scientific work.

Yarrell is best known as the author of A History of British Fishes (2 vols., 1836) and A History of British Birds featuring 564 original engravings (in 3 vols., first ed. 1843, second ed. 1845, third ed. 1856). The latter went into several editions and was the standard reference work for a generation of British ornithologists. He described Bewick's swan in 1830, distinguishing it from the larger whooper swan.

== Early life ==
Yarrell was born in Duke Street, St James's in London, to Francis Yarrell and his wife Sarah (née Blane). His father and uncle ran a newspaper agency and bookshop. He studied at Dr Nicholson's school in Ealing. His father died in 1794 and the Yarrells moved the short distance to Great Ryder Street, where William lived the rest of his life. In 1802 he became a clerk with the Herries, Farquhar and Co. bank. In 1803 he and his cousin, Edward Jones, joined his father's business. He sometimes left the business in Jones's care, going into the countryside to fish and shoot. He acquired the reputation of being the best shot and the best angler in London, soon becoming an expert naturalist. He sent many bird specimens to Thomas Bewick, who engraved them as woodcuts for his own book of British birds.

== Career ==
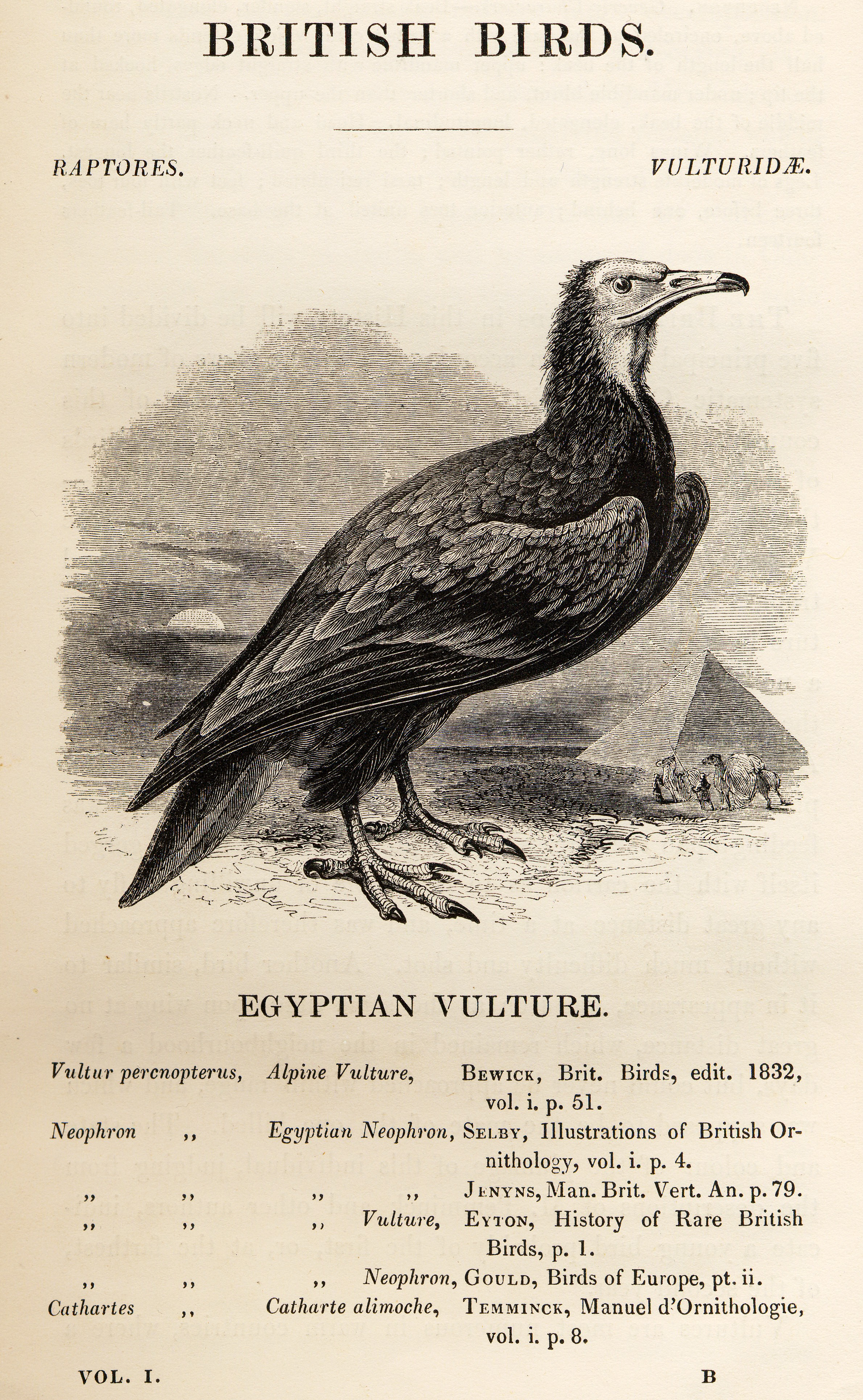
Egyptian vulture in Yarrell's A History of British Birds (1843)

He joined the Royal Institution in 1817. His first publication, at the age of 40, was "On the Occurrence of some Rare British Birds" (1825). This was published in the 2nd volume of the 'Zoological Journal' and he later became one of that journal's editors. He was elected a Fellow of the Linnean Society in 1825. He wrote in 1827 on the structure of the tracheae of birds and on plumage changes in pheasants. He corresponded and shared specimens with other naturalists including Thomas Bewick (from 1825), Sir William Jardine, Prideaux John Selby and Nicholas Aylward Vigors, as well as with the Cornish naturalist Jonathan Couch, who provided him with many specimens, especially of fish.

Yarrell was one of the original members of the Zoological Society of London. In 1833, he was a founder of what became the Royal Entomological Society of London. He was acknowledged by John James Audubon both as a "valued friend" and for the information and "precious specimens of birds and eggs, collected in the desolate regions of the extreme north." He served for many years as treasurer both of the Entomological Society and of the Linnean Society.

== Works ==
Yarrell's major works were A History of British Fishes (1836) and A History of British Birds (1843), the latter having the same title as the popular book by Thomas Bewick, published from 1797 to 1804, but with a different set of engravings.

British Birds was first published "in thirty-seven parts of three sheets each, at intervals of two months; the first Part was issued in July 1837 and the last in May 1843." The sheets were then collected into two volumes, with the addition of "many occurrences of rare birds and of some that were even new to Britain". The additional birds were listed and briefly described in the Preface and "the new subjects have been engraved on single leaves, so paged, that the bookbinder may insert these separate leaves among the birds of the genus to which each respectively belongs."

British Birds was illustrated with drawings by Alexander Fussell. Yarrell thanks him for "nearly five hundred of the drawings on wood here employed". The pen for the remaining drawings (the title-page asserts there are 520 in the book) is not stated. Yarrell also thanks John Thompson (1785–1866) and his sons for the "very long series of engravings" of the drawings, as well as his printers, Messrs. Bentley, Wilson and Fley.

At the time of its release, Yarrell's Birds was considered the best work on the subject both scientifically and artistically, as noted by Prof. Alfred Newton in his "Prospectus" to the 1871 edition, from which Yarrell's introduction was removed along with the names of contributing artists under Thompson's direction. Both Yarrell's books were so popular that their publisher John van Voorst stated that sales exceeded £4,000. Thomas R. Forbes, in his biographical paper on Yarrell, writes that "All [editions of Birds] are outstanding because of the author's clear, narrative style, accuracy, careful scholarship and unassuming charm."

Yarrell's last paper, "On the Influence of the Sexual Organ in Modifying External Character" (1856), described an experiment that disproved the belief that when a stag lacks a healthy testicle, it will fail to grow an antler on that side of the body.

== Legacy ==
Yarrell died during a trip to Great Yarmouth and a memorial was erected in St James's Church, Piccadilly. He was buried in the churchyard of St Mary's in Bayford, Hertfordshire, with his chosen epitaph "He was the survivor of twelve brothers and sisters, who, with their father and mother, are all placed close to this spot" together with William Wordsworth's lines "first and last, The earliest summon'd and the longest spared — Are here deposited."

Yarrell has a number of species named after him, including the birds yellow-faced siskin (Carduelis yarrellii) and Chilean woodstar (Eulidia yarrellii) and the fish Yarrell's blenny (Chirolophis ascanii). The British subspecies of the white wagtail, the pied wagtail (Motacilla alba yarrellii), was also named for him.

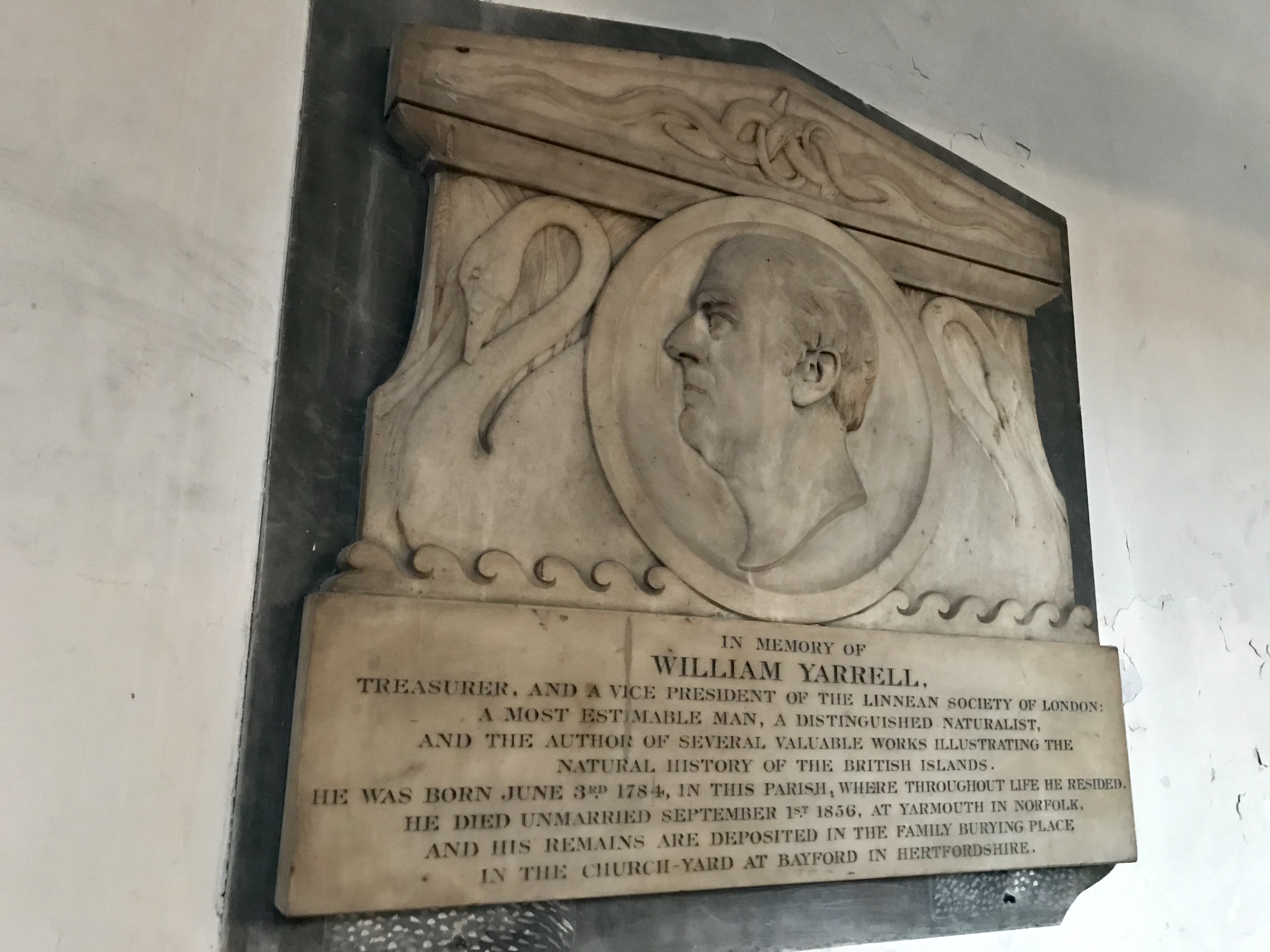
A memorial to William Yarrell in St James's Church, Piccadilly

More information on William Yarrell can be found in Christine Jackson's detailed biography: Jackson, Christine E. (2022) A Newsworthy Naturalist: The Life of William Yarrell. John Beaufoy Publishing. 228 pp. 12 plates. 60 b/w illustrations. ISBN 9781913679040

== Publications ==
- Observations on the Tracheae of Birds, with Descriptions and Representations of several not hitherto figured. — Linn. Trans. 1827, 15. 378.
- Description of a species of Tringa, killed in Cambridgeshire, new to England and Europe. — Linn. Trans. 16. 109.
- On the Organs of Voice in Birds. — Linn. Trans. 16. 305.
- On a new species of Wild Swan, taken in England, and hitherto confounded with the Hooper. — Linn. Trans. 16. 445.
- Description of the Organs of Voice in a new species of Wild Swan (Cygnus buccinator, Richards.). — Linn. Trans. 17.
- Descriptions of Three British Species of Freshwater Fishes, belonging to the genus Leuciscus of Klein. — Linn. Trans. 17. 5.
- On the Habits and Structure of the Great Bustard (Otis tarda of Linnaeus). — Linn. Trans. 21. 155.
- Notice of an Interwoven Mass of Filaments of Conferva fluviatilis of extraordinary size. — Proc. Linn. Soc. 1. 65.
- On the Influence of the Sexual Organ in modifying External Character. — Journ. Linn. Soc. 1857, 1. 76–82.
- On the Growth of the Salmon in Freshwater, with six coloured illustrations of the fish of the natural size. Oblong Folio. van Voorst, London, 1839.

Professional and academic associations
| Preceded by Edward Turner Bennett | Secretary of the Zoological Society of London; 1836–1838 | Succeeded by William Ogilby |
