= Charles Thompson (engraver) =

Charles Thompson (1791–1843) was a British wood-engraver, who made a career in France.

== Life ==
A younger brother of John Thompson, he was born in London. He was a pupil of John Bewick and Allen Robert Branston, and became a wood-engraver

In 1816 Thompson found work in Paris, where he executed illustrations to many publications. His work was admired, and in 1824 he was awarded a gold medal. He introduced into France the English method of carving the end of the wood, instead of in the direction of the grain, and using the graver instead of the knife. The atelier he opened in 1817 instructed numerous French students.

Thompson died at Bourg-la-Reine, near Paris, on 19 May 1843, and his widow was granted a pension by the French government.

== Works ==
Thompson produced illustration's for Samuel Weller Singer's 1817 edition of Torquato Tasso, in Edward Fairfax's translation; and for Singer's Shakespeare (1826). In the 1820s he shared a place in Peckham with his brother John, but became a French resident. In Paris he worked for Léon Curmer. He was involved in the 1835–6 edition of Molière.

== Notes ==
Attribution

This article incorporates text from a publication now in the public domain: Lee, Sidney, ed. (1898). "Thompson, John (1785-1866)". Dictionary of National Biography. Vol. 56. London: Smith, Elder & Co.
