= Isabel Agnes Cowper =

British photographer (1826–1911)

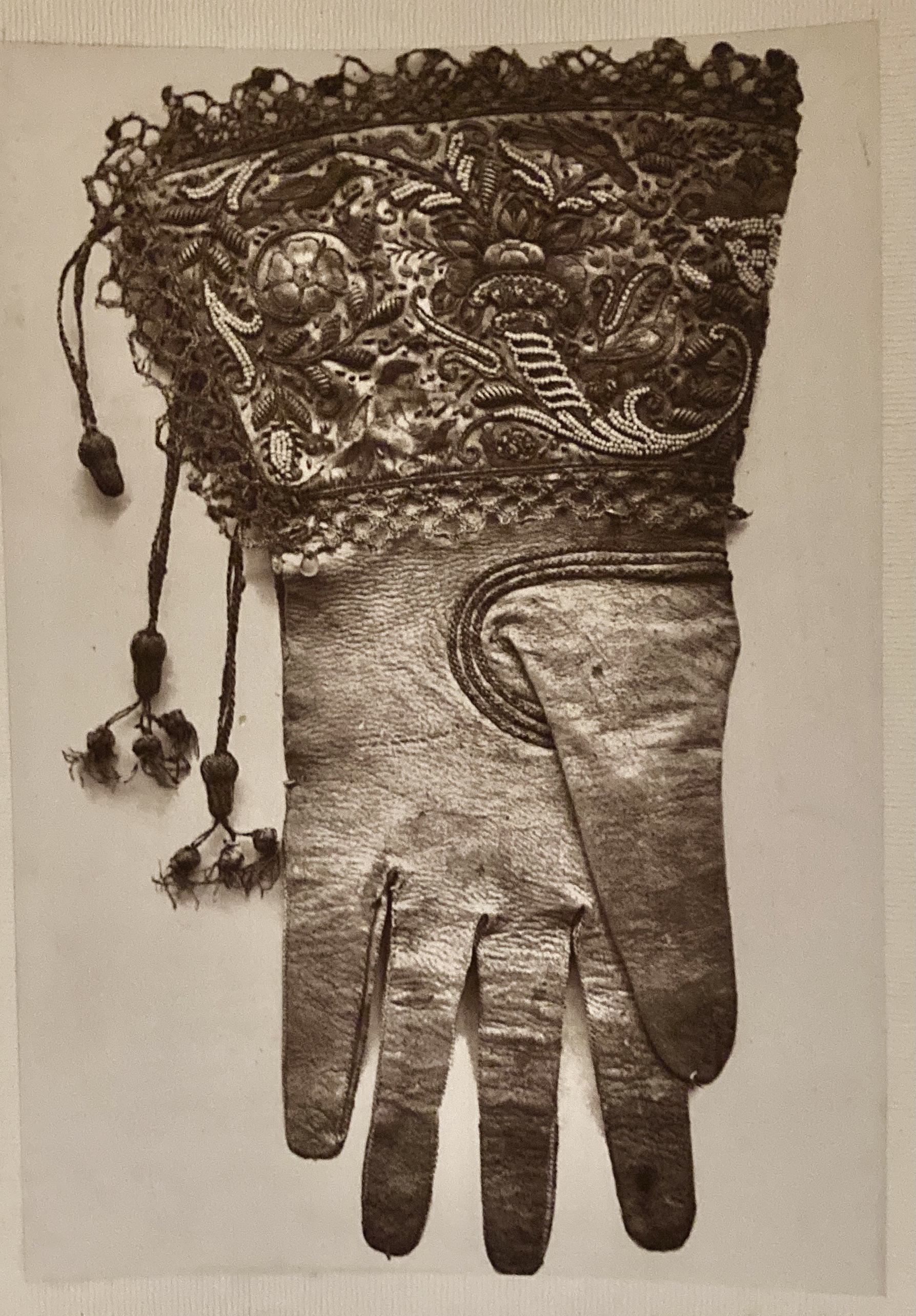
- Photograph by Isabel Agnes Cowper, c. 1884 (Note: 17th century Spanish Embroidered Glove, albumen print, ca. 1884, V&A no. 84715A)
- Born: 1826
- Died: 17 February 1911 (aged 84–85)
- Known for: Official Museum Photographer, South Kensington Museum (Victoria and Albert Museum, London)

Isabel Agnes Cowper (née Thompson; 7 July 1826 – 17 February 1911), a British wood-engraver and photographer, was the first female Official Museum Photographer at the South Kensington Museum (now the Victoria and Albert Museum) and possibly the first female Official Museum Photographer ever. From 1868, when Cowper assumed the role at the museum, to her retirement in 1891, Cowper made thousands of photographs documenting the museum and loan objects and the construction of the museum buildings. In her lifetime, Cowper's photographs were widely circulated as illustrations in South Kensington Museum publications and examples of her work are continually being discovered in libraries and archives around the world.

== Early life and education ==
Cowper was born in the borough of Kensington, London in 1826 to Harriott and John Thompson, an eminent wood-engraver and director of the wood-engraving class for 'ladies' at the Central School of Design. They resided at 1 Campden Hill Terrace (now Bedford Gardens) in Kensington, London. From an early age, Cowper and her four siblings: Charles Thurston Thompson, Richard Anthony Thompson, Eliza Thompson and Augusta Thompson, were recognised as accomplished wood-engravers, having apprenticed with their father.

In 1841, Henry Cole, the founding Director of the South Kensington Museum, and an advocate of wood-engraving as a suitable career for women, employed Cowper and her sisters to engrave the illustrations to his guides to Westminster Abbey and Hampton Court Palace.

Cowper made numerous wood engravings for a range of publications, including Cole's guidebooks, the 19th century English writer and art critic John Ruskin's fairytale, The King of the Golden River, written for twelve-year old Euphemia (Effie) Gray, and a collection of children's stories compiled by illustrator Richard Doyle. A selection of Cowper's wood-engravings are in the collection of the Victoria and Albert Museum.

== Marriage and family ==
On 30 March 1852 Isabel married Charles Cowper and moved to 4 Campden Hill Terrace in Kensington. Charles was a chemist with the glass manufacturing firm Messrs Chance Bros., makers of sheet and photographic glass, before setting up on his own as a patent agent, patenting various improvements in photography. On 22 March 1853 Isabel gave birth to a stillborn son. Isabel and Charles had two more sons and two daughters. When Charles died on 23 December 1860 Isabel was pregnant. Charles's estate, valued at over £4000, including shares in a company, passed to Isabel.

== Career at the South Kensington Museum ==
Little is known of Cowper's life between the time of her husband Charles's death in 1860 and 1868 when she took on the role of the South Kensington Museum's Official Museum Photographer. It is not known for sure where or with whom Cowper was tutored in photography, though it's likely that she gained her knowledge from both her brother and husband. Wherever she honed her skills, references recorded in Henry Cole's diary to 'Mrs. Cowper's' arrival in Paris in 1867 suggests that in widowhood, Cowper was working alongside her brother, Charles Thurston Thompson, in his role as the South Kensington Museum's first Official Museum Photographer.

When Thurston Thompson died after a long illness on 21 January 1868, Henry Cole was visited by Thompson's widow, Charlotte (his wife's sister), recommending Cowper for the role of Official Museum Photographer. On 10 February 1868 Cowper submitted an application for the job. By March later that year, the museum photography studio registers record positive prints and negatives delivered to the photographic studio by 'Mrs. Cowper'.

By 1871, Cowper's address is listed as 3, The Museum Residences, accommodation at the South Kensington Museum reserved for senior staff. She lived there with her four children (Sydney, Beatrice, Richard and Ada—the youngest, Charles Eaton Cowper having died in 1867), her two sisters, Eliza and Augusta, her brother Richard, who would eventually become the Assistant Director of the museum and two servants.

Upon assuming the role as Official Museum Photographer, Cowper oversaw the museum's photographic studio, including the production of thousands of collodion on glass negatives. To this day, many of her original glass negatives survive in the V&A Museum archive. Cowper's negatives were put to work in a variety of manner: they were used to print albumen positives; employed in photomechanical processes producing illustrations for the volumes published by the museum that were widely circulated to the regional art schools and galleries as well as to international museums and libraries; they were collected in the National Art Library for use by artists and scholars; they were sold to the public at a dedicated sales stall located onsite at the museum; they were used as models for the still life examinations that were part of the National Curriculum; and they were also made into lantern slides which were employed by museum experts as projected visual examples for instructional lectures. Cowper's original albumen prints are still being identified and catalogued today.

In addition to making photographs for the museum, during her tenure, Cowper was also asked to provide expert opinions on photographic matters, including the photographing of the Bayeaux Tapestry and the storage and insurance of the museum's substantial glass negative stores. Cowper also exhibited photographic works in the International Fairs of 1871, 1872,1873 and 1874 for which she was recognised in the art press. She was also cited in the contemporary art journals for her excellent skills photographing lace and textiles. She registered photographs with the national copyright office and also photographed Henry Cole's children. There is no evidence that she joined any professional organisations.

Cowper signed all her glass negatives. This was likely a way for her to track her work for payment. When first employed, Cowper was paid at a rate of 3 pence per square inch of glass negative made. As a woman, Cowper was denied a position within the civil service, among whose ranks most male members of the museum staff were employed. As such, throughout the 23 years that she worked at the museum, she was employed as an outside contractor and was paid on a per piece basis.

== Retirement and death ==
In 1891, with the retirement of her brother, Richard, the South Kensington Museum Assistant Director, Cowper submitted her retirement to then Museum Director, Captain Donnelly, effective from 31 December 1891. Cowper moved with her brother to the town of Sutton in Surrey. With the death of Richard in 1908, Cowper moved to Glasgow, Scotland, residing at 9 Derby Crescent, joining her married daughter, Beatrice Hedley. Cowper died on 17 February 1911 in Glasgow. She was 85 years old. She is buried alongside her parents, brothers and three of her children in Kensal Green Cemetery.
