= John Thompson (engraver) =

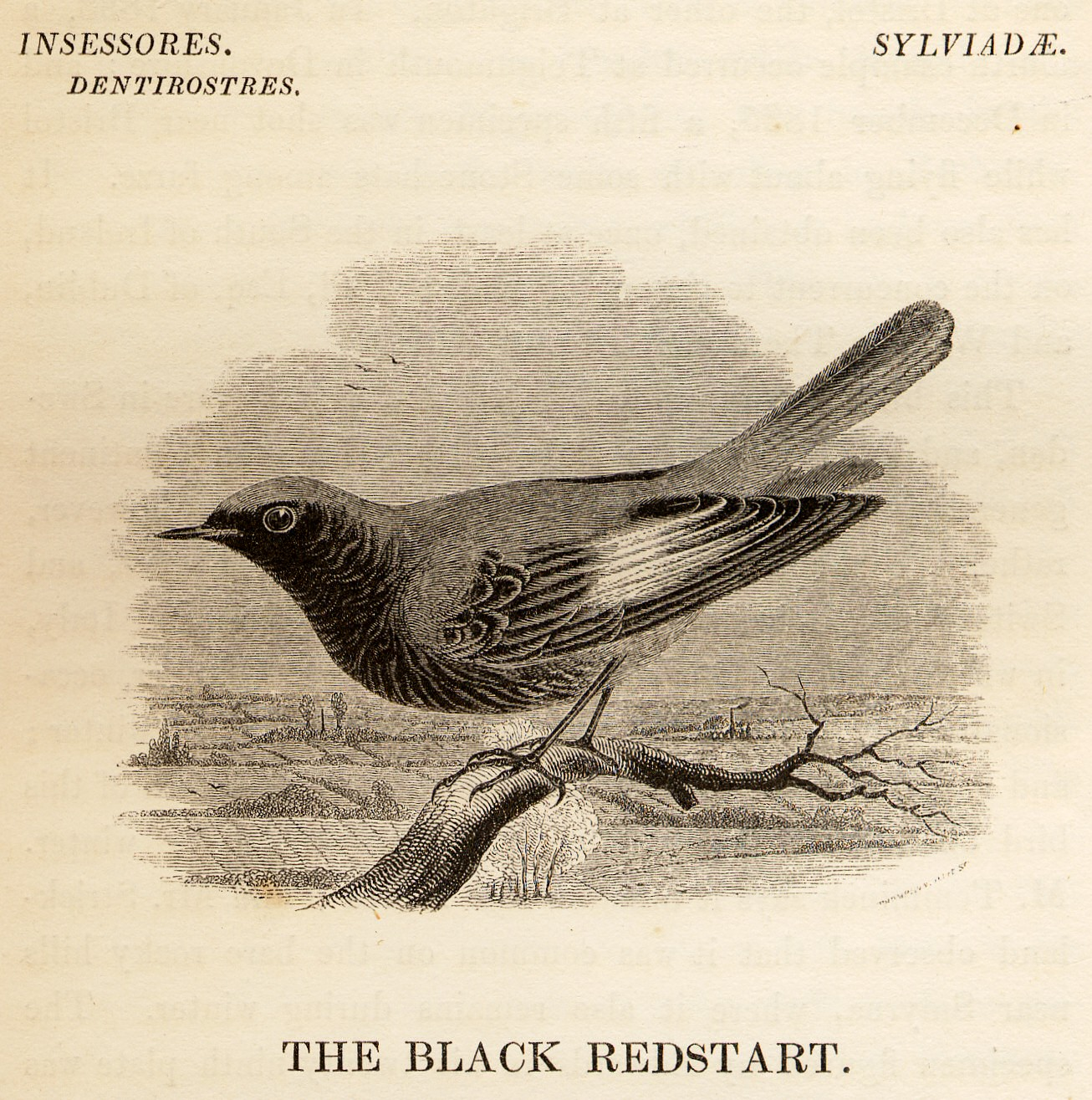
John Thompson's drawing and engraving of the black redstart in William Yarrell's 1843 History of British Birds.

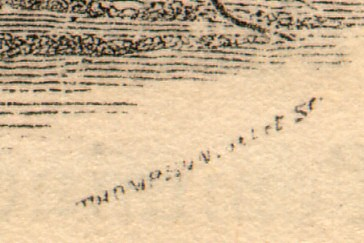
Rare signature "Thompson Del et Sc" (Thompson drew and carved this) at lower right of black redstart

John Thompson (25 May 1785 – 20 February 1866) was a British wood-engraver. He is best known for his contribution to William Yarrell's 1843 History of British Birds. He was described as the most distinguished wood-engraver of his time.

Thompson also engraved the design for the 1839 penny postage envelope, on a brass plate; and the design for the iconic figure of Britannia which appeared on British banknotes.

== Life and work ==
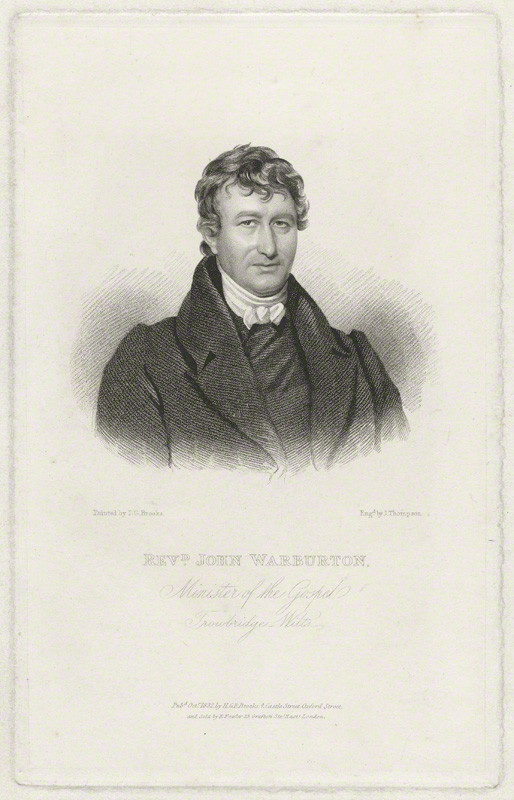
Stipple engraving of Revd. John Warburton of Trowbridge by John Thompson, 1832. Sold by E. Fowler.

Thompson was born in Manchester to a London merchant, Richard Thompson.

He trained under the wood-engraver Allen Robert Branston, and then collaborated with the artist John Thurston. He engraved around 900 of Thurston's designs from 1814 onwards including illustrations for Butler's Hudibras in 1918. He is described as Branston's "most celebrated pupil".

He illustrated many books, becoming in the words of Freeman Marius O'Donoghue in the Dictionary of National Biography "the most distinguished wood-engraver of his time", and "perhaps the ablest exponent that has ever lived of the style of wood engraving which aimed at rivalling the effect of copper". He is thanked by William Yarrell in the preface to History of British Birds for engraving the original drawings by Alexander Fussell, "nearly five hundred of the drawings on wood here employed", in what was a "very long series of engravings".

As well as wood-engravings for books, Thompson engraved the design for the penny postage envelope "in relief on brass" in 1839, and in 1852 he engraved on steel the figure of Britannia which appeared on British banknotes for the rest of the nineteenth century.

Thompson won the grand medal of honour for wood-engraving at the 1855 Paris exhibition.

== Family ==
His younger brother, Charles Thompson (1791–1843), was likewise an engraver. Charles studied under the Newcastle engraver John Bewick, the younger brother of Thomas Bewick; the latter produced the predecessor to Yarrell's handbook, also named History of British Birds (first published 1797–1804). Charles won a gold medal for his illustrations in Paris in 1824.

John Thompson's eldest son, Charles Thurston Thompson (1816–1868), followed his father into the wood-engraving profession. After assisting in organising the Great Exhibition of 1851 in London, he moved into photography and became the South Kensington Museum's official photographer.

His other son, Richard Anthony Thompson was an assistant director at the South Kensington Museum (until 1892).

Thompson's three daughters, Isabel Agnes Cowper, Eliza Thompson and Augusta Thompson, were also accomplished wood-engravers. Cowper followed her brother, Charles Thurston Thompson into photography, assuming his role as the South Kensington Museum's official photographer upon his death.
