= William Harvey (artist) =

English engraver and designer (1796–1866)

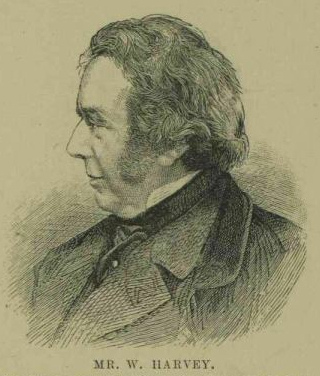
William Harvey, wood-engraving from Illustrated London News

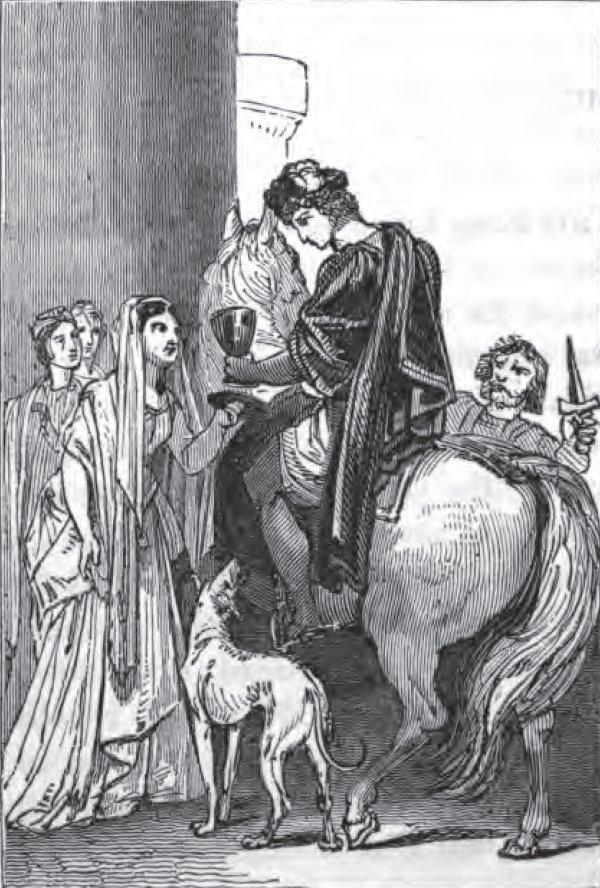
1835 woodcut by Harvey portraying the killing of King Edward the Martyr

William Harvey (13 July 1796 – 13 January 1866) was a British wood-engraver and illustrator.

Born at Newcastle upon Tyne, Harvey was the son of a bath-keeper. At the age of 14, he was apprenticed to Thomas Bewick, and became one of his favorite pupils. Bewick describes him as one "who both as an engraver & designer, stands preeminent" at his day (Memoir, p. 200). He engraved many woodblocks for Bewick's Aesop's Fables (1818).

Harvey moved to London in 1817, studying drawing with Benjamin Haydon, and anatomy with Charles Bell. In 1821, he made a wood-engraving after Haydon in imitation of engraving, the large block of the Assassination of L. S. Dentatus. This was probably the then most ambitious woodblock which had been cut in England.

Harvey switched to design, after the death of John Thurston, the then leading wood designer in London. One of his earliest works is his illustrations for Alexander Henderson's History of Ancient and Modern Wines in 1824.

His masterpieces are his illustrations to Northcote's Fables (1823–33) and to E. W. Lane's The Arabian Nights' Entertainments (1838–40).

Harvey died at Prospect Lodge, The Vineyard, Richmond and is buried in Richmond Old Burial Ground.

== Gallery ==
Illustrations to The Arabian Nights (1838–40, woodcuts)

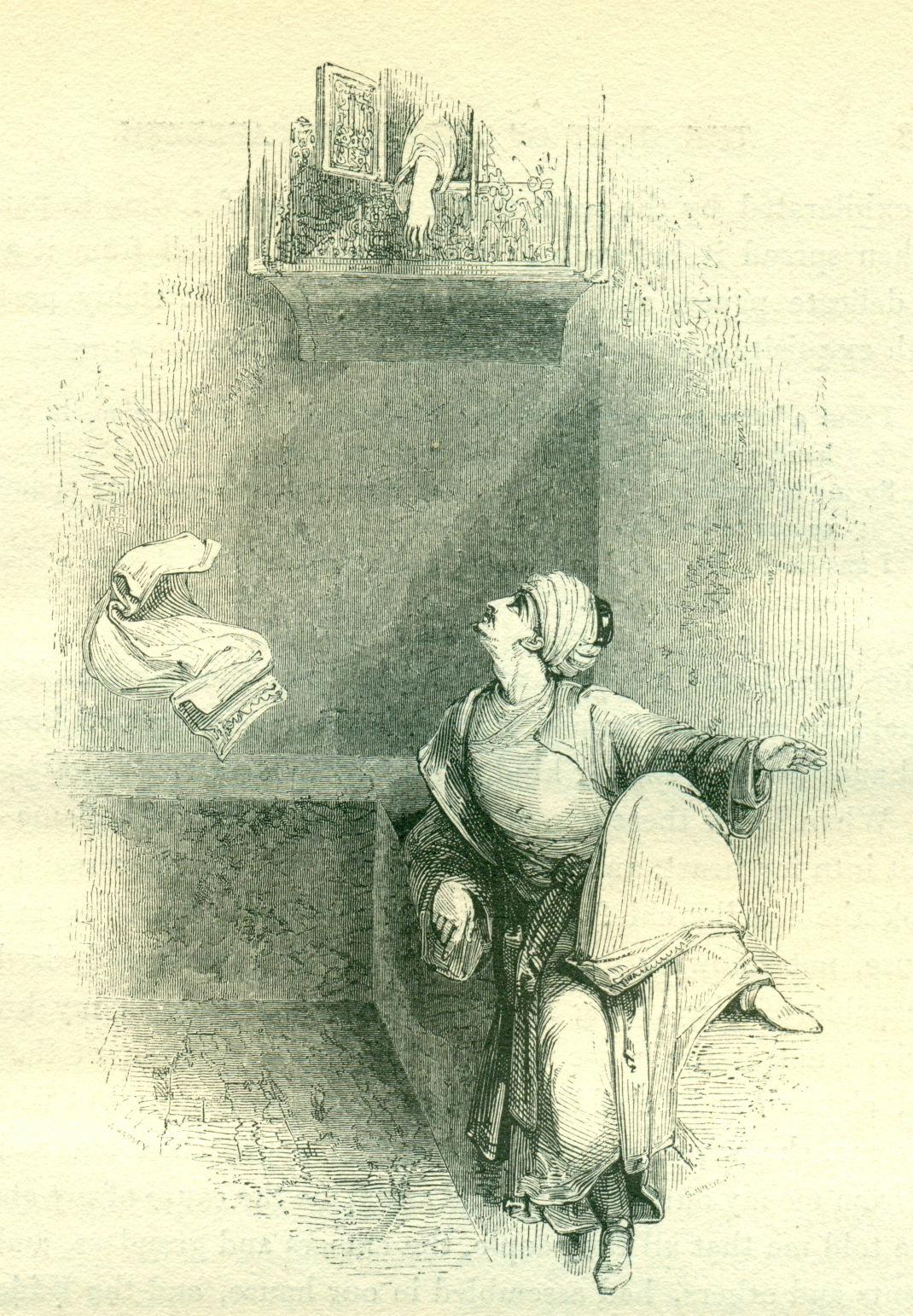
Illustration to The Story of Azeez and Azeezeh

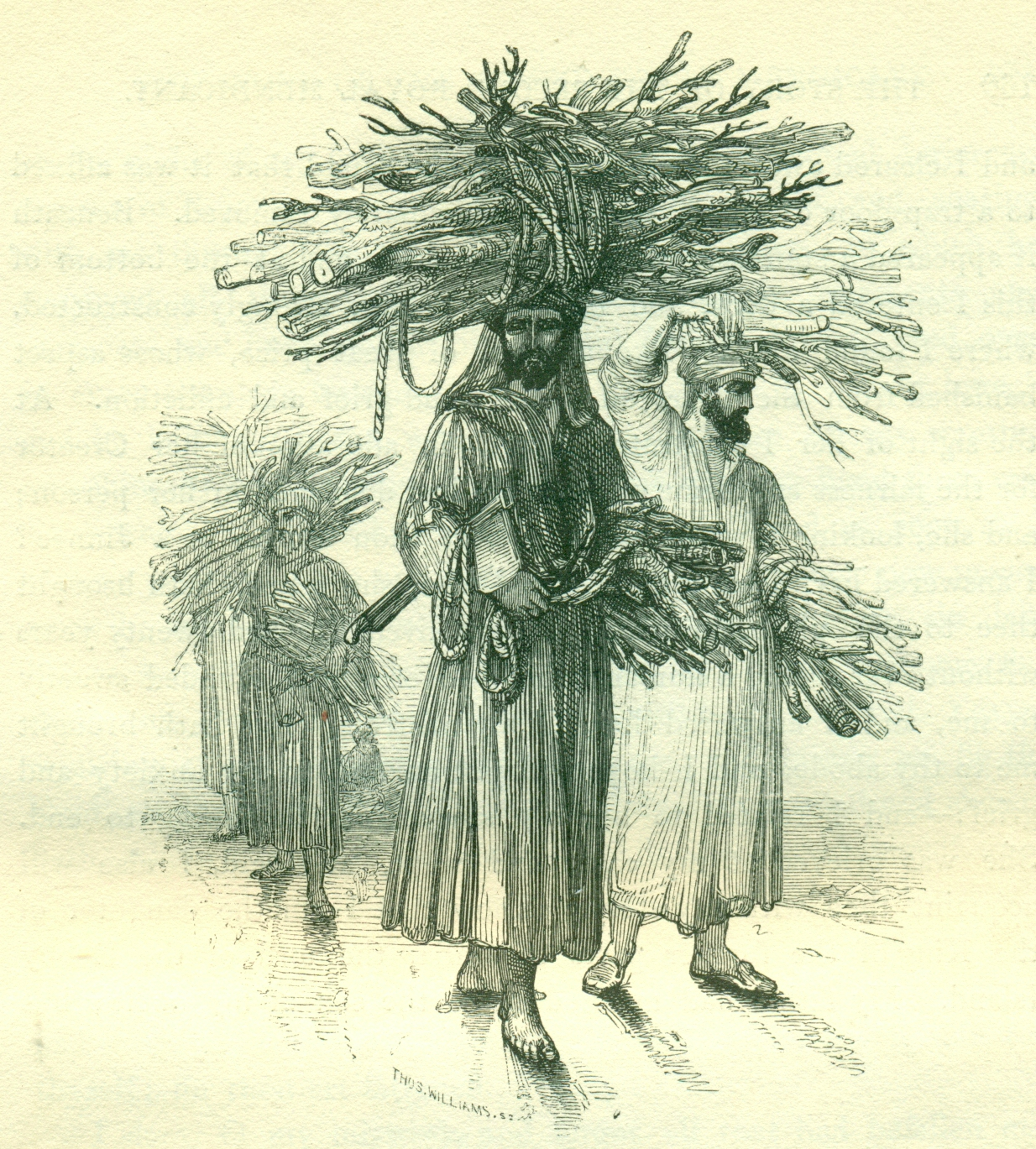
Illustration to The Story of the Two Royal Mendicants

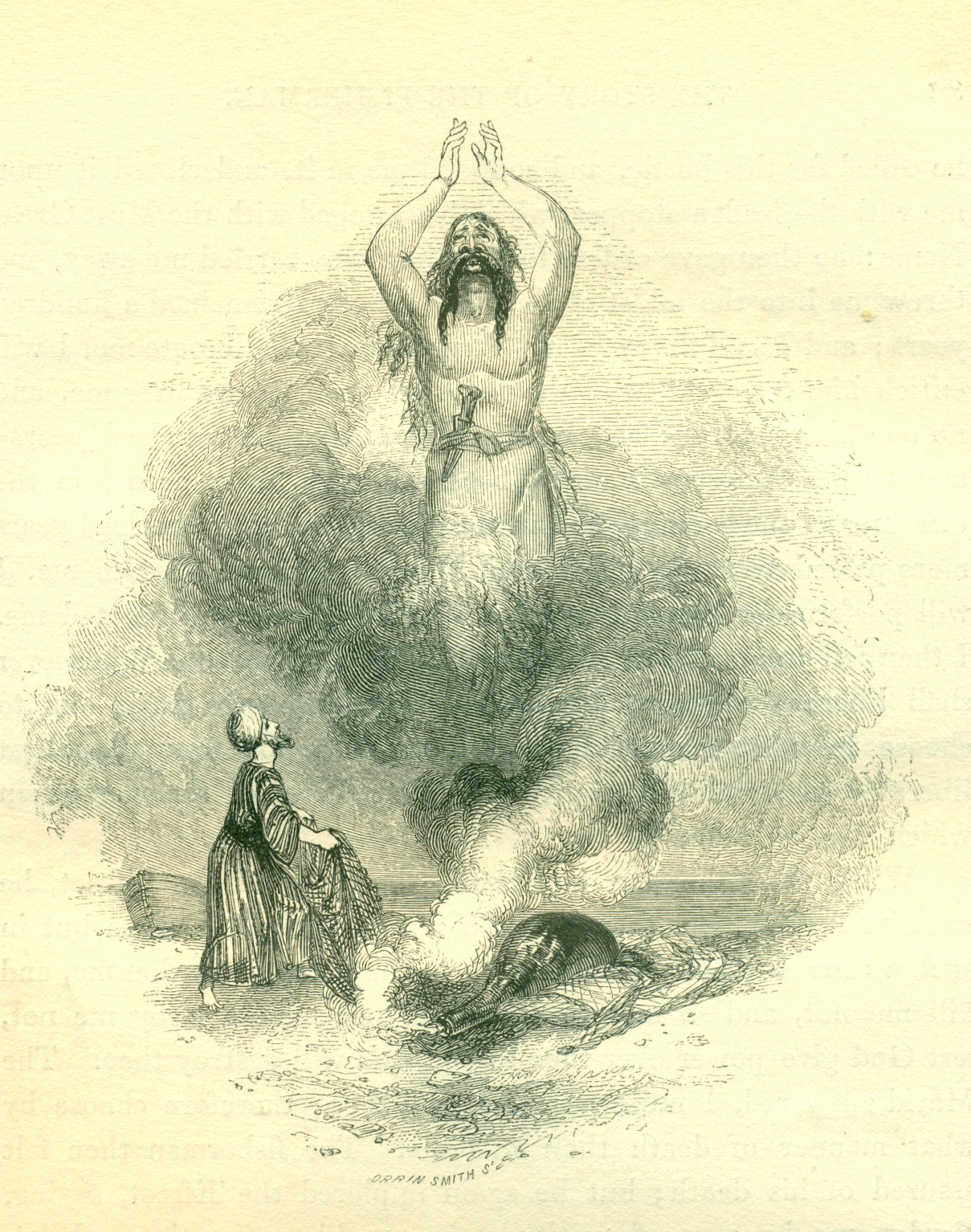
Illustration to The Story of the Fisherman

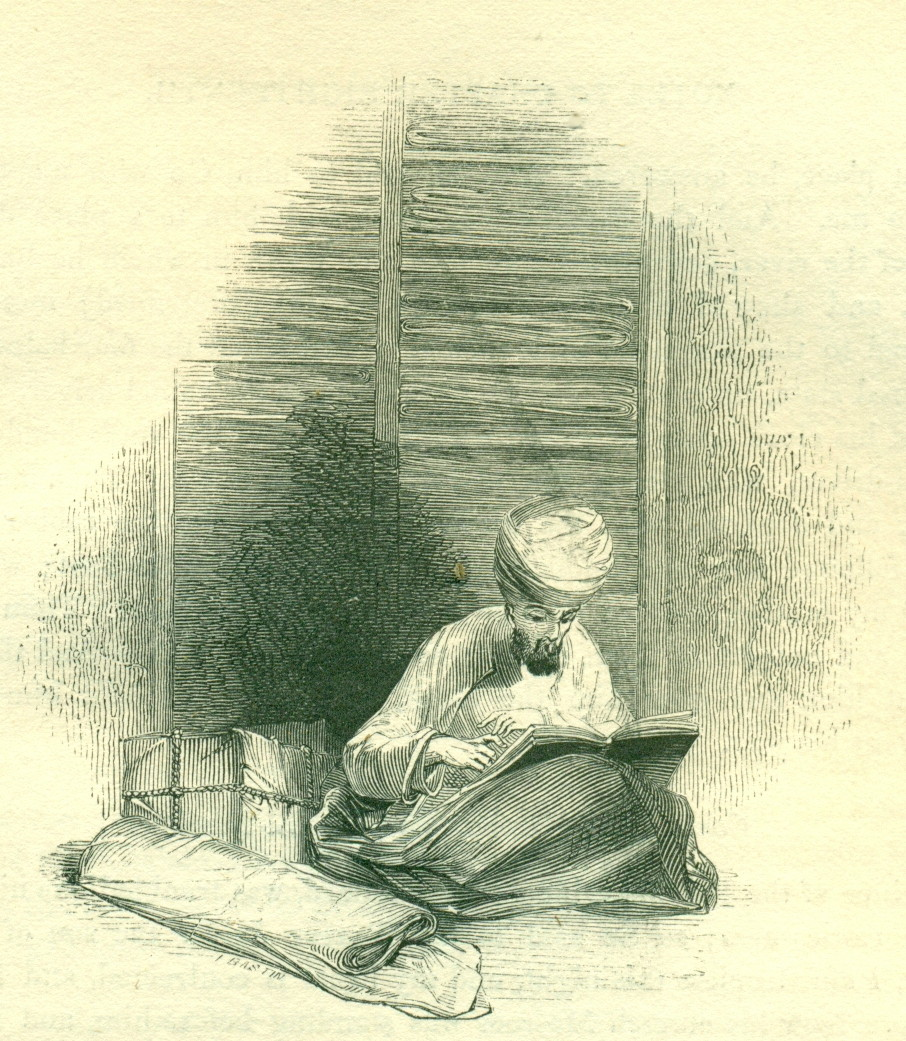
Illustration to The Story of uns El-Wojood

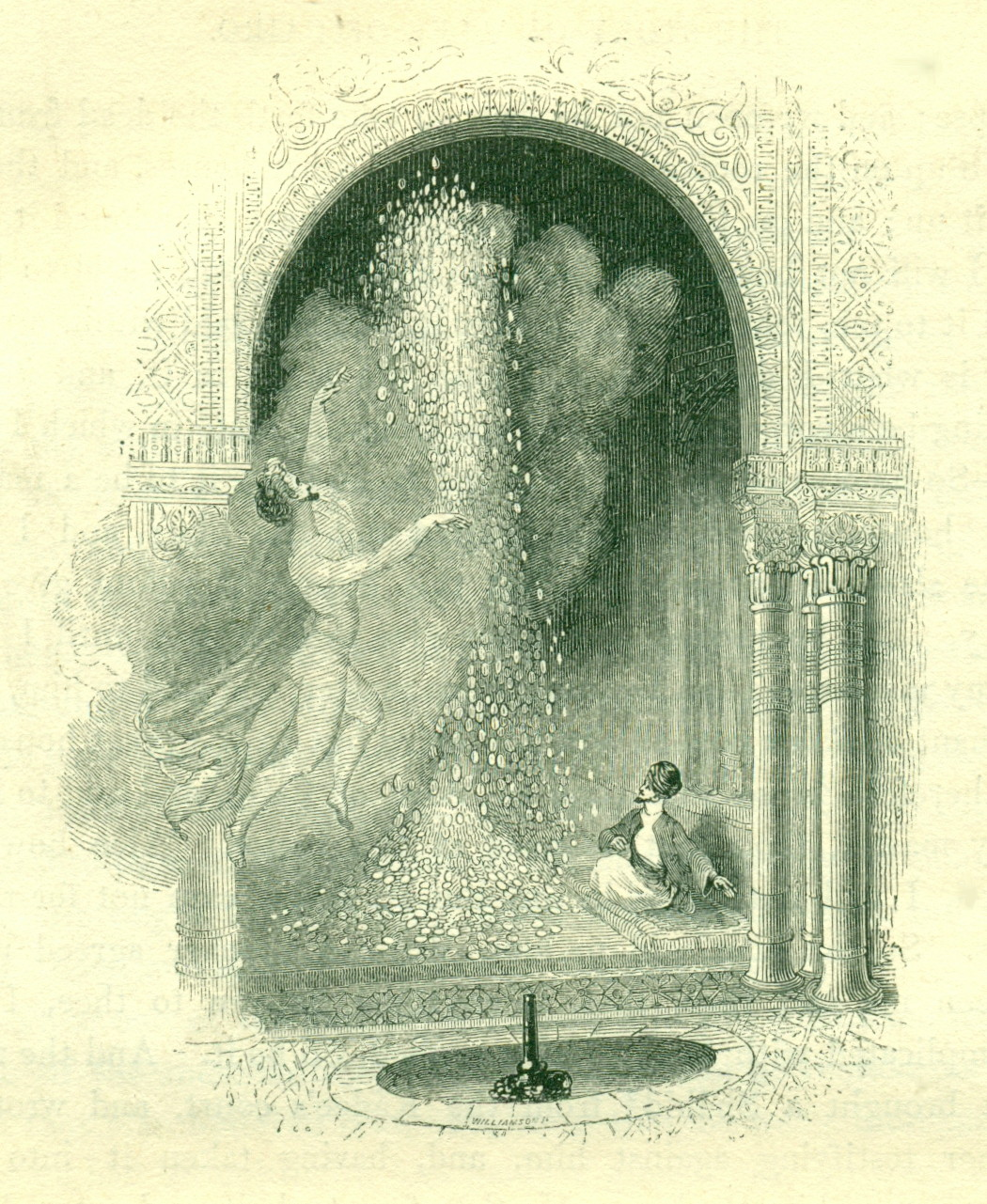
Illustration to The Story of Alee of Cairo

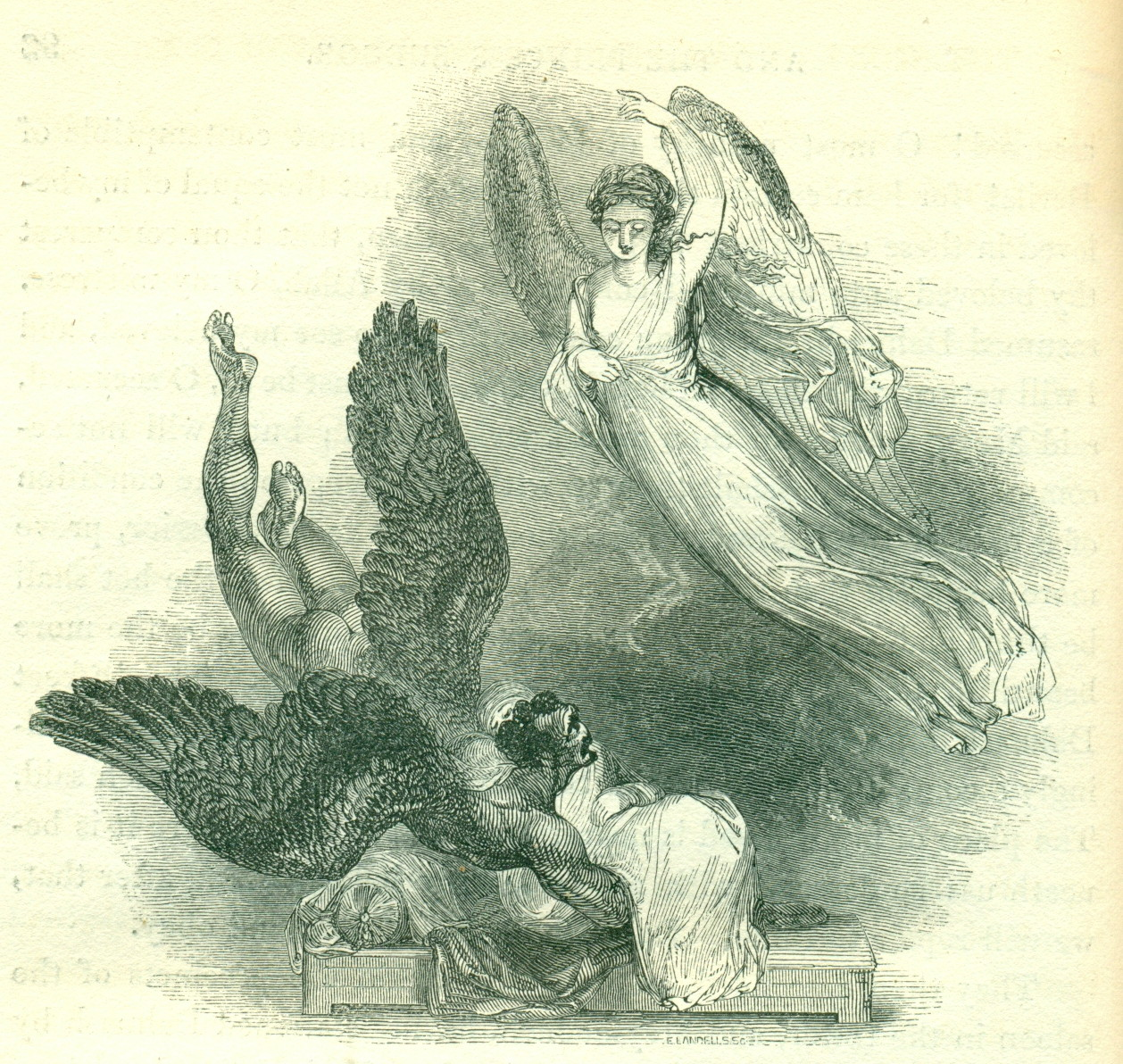
Illustration to The Story of the Prince Kamar ez-Zeman, and the Princess Budoor

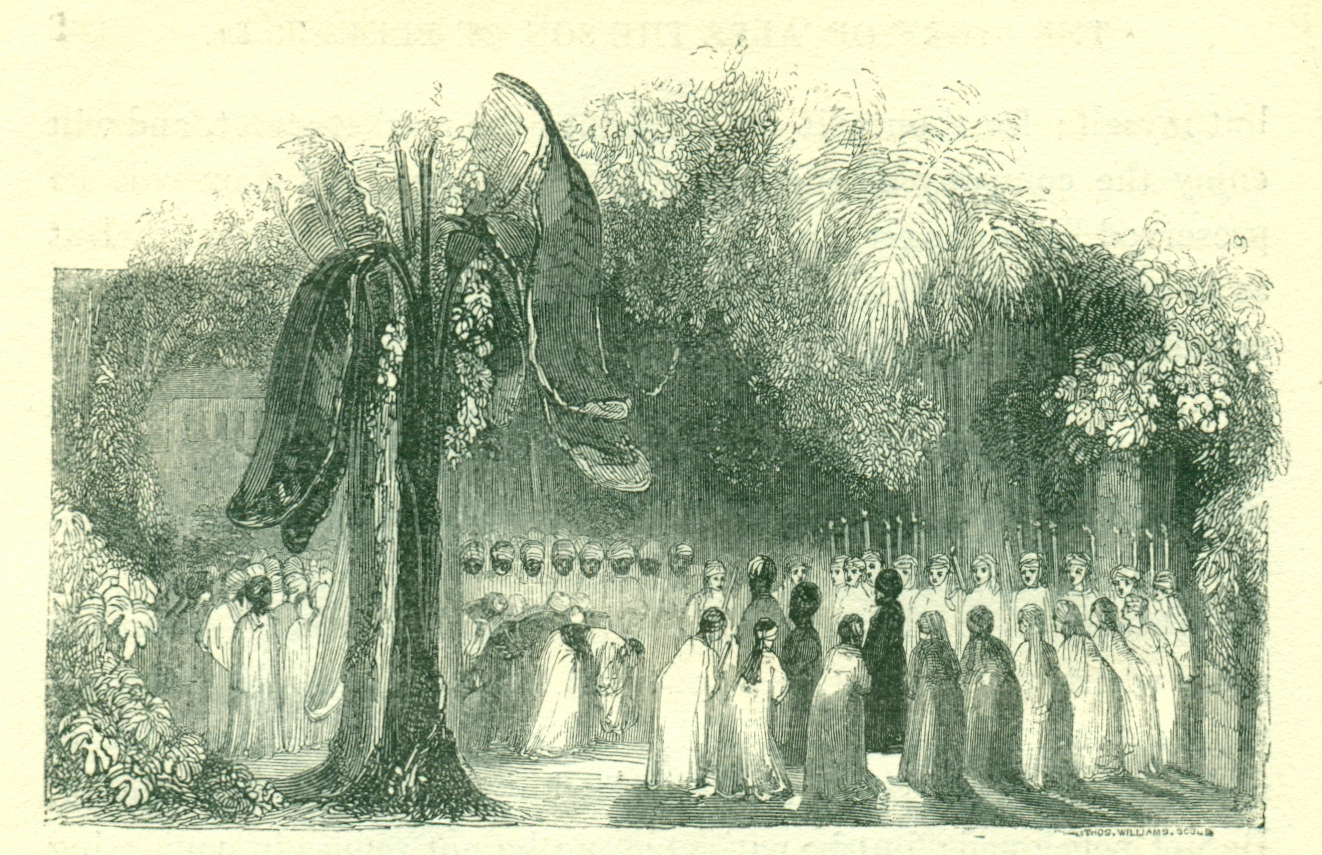
Illustration to The Story of Alee the son of Bekkar, and Shems en-Nahr

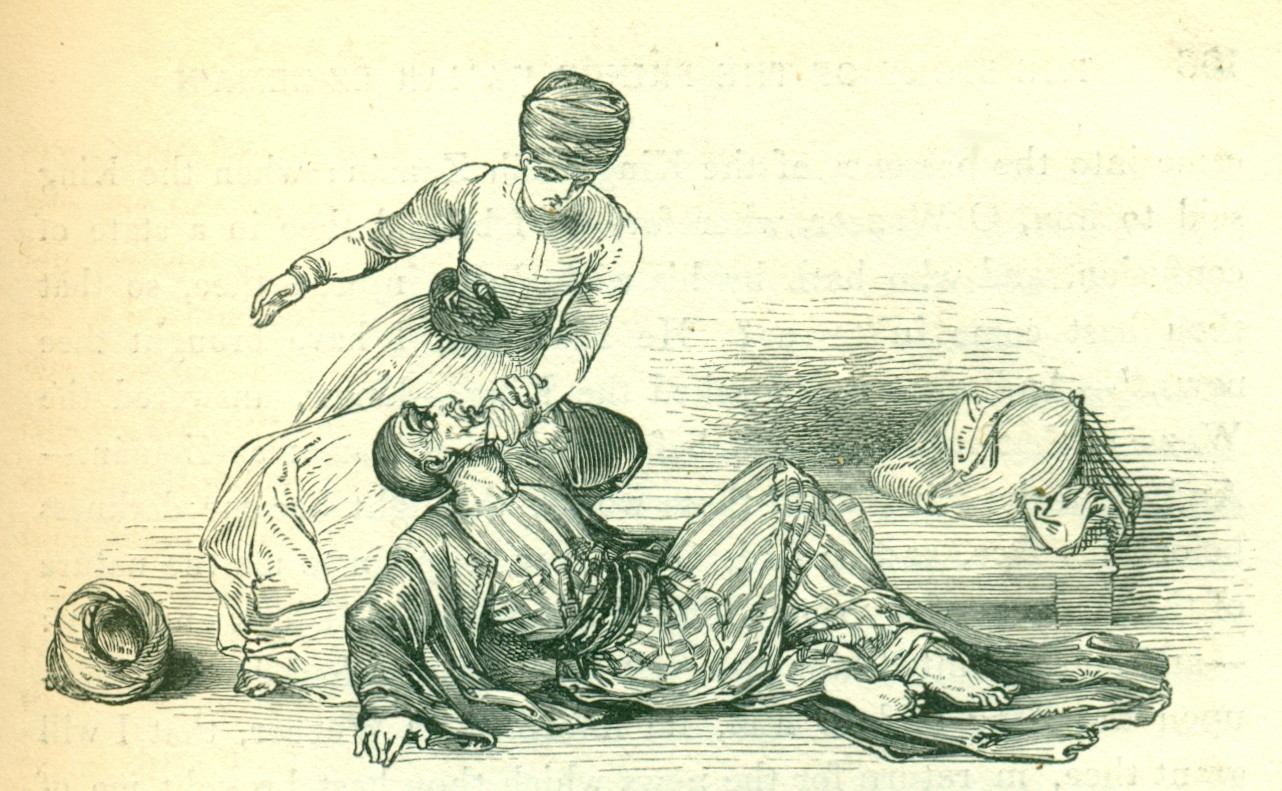
Illustration to The Story of the Prince Kamar ez-Zeman, and the Princess Budoor

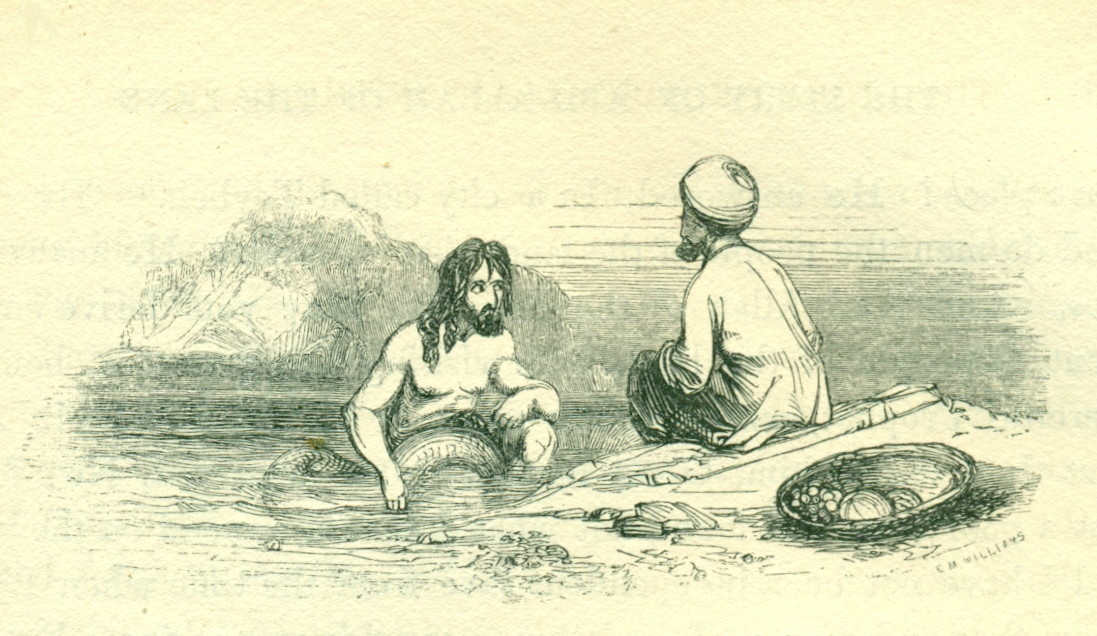
Illustration to The Story of Abd Allah of the Land and Abd Allah of the Sea

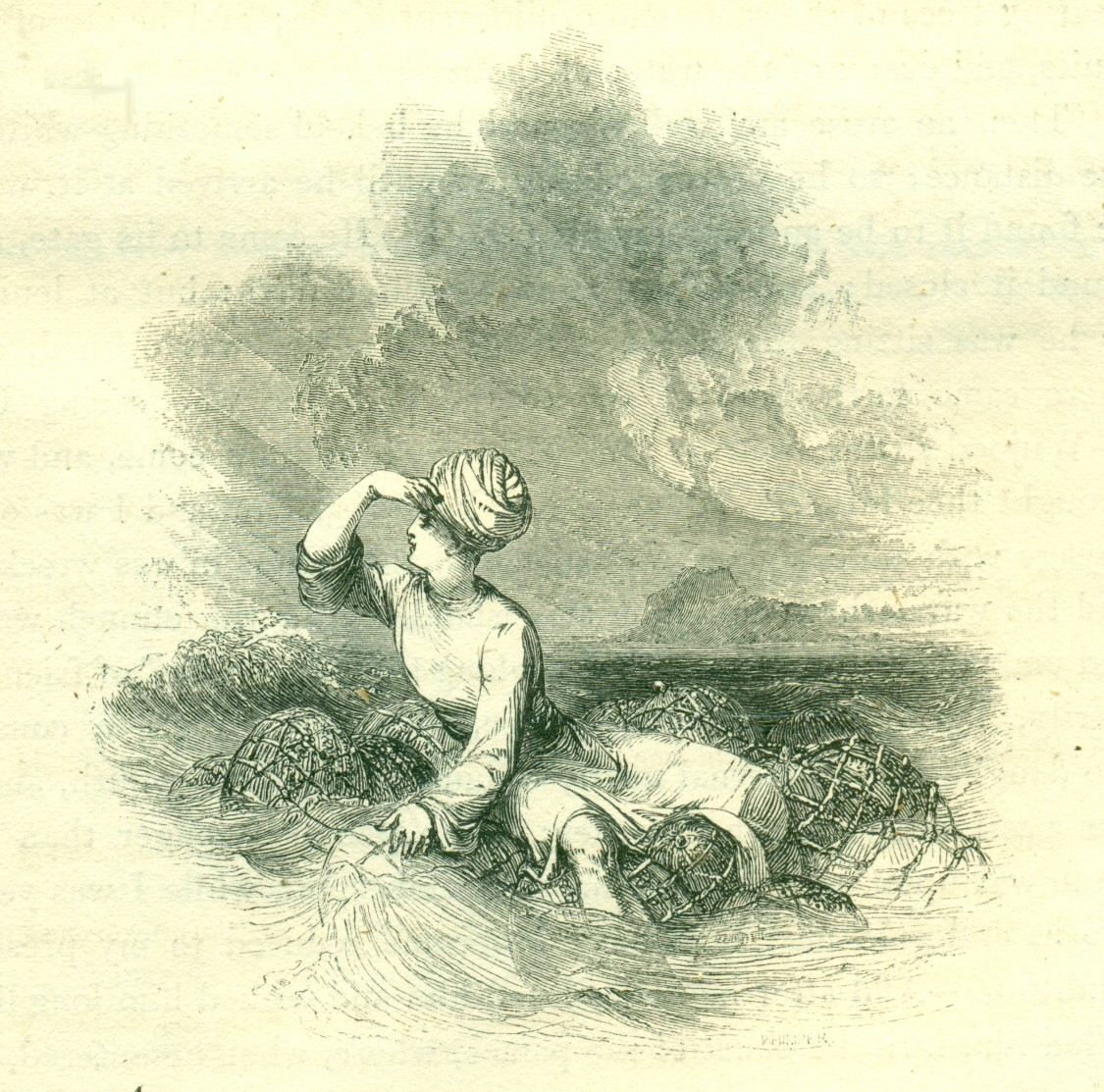
Illustration to The Story of ... El-Ward Fi-l-Akma'm

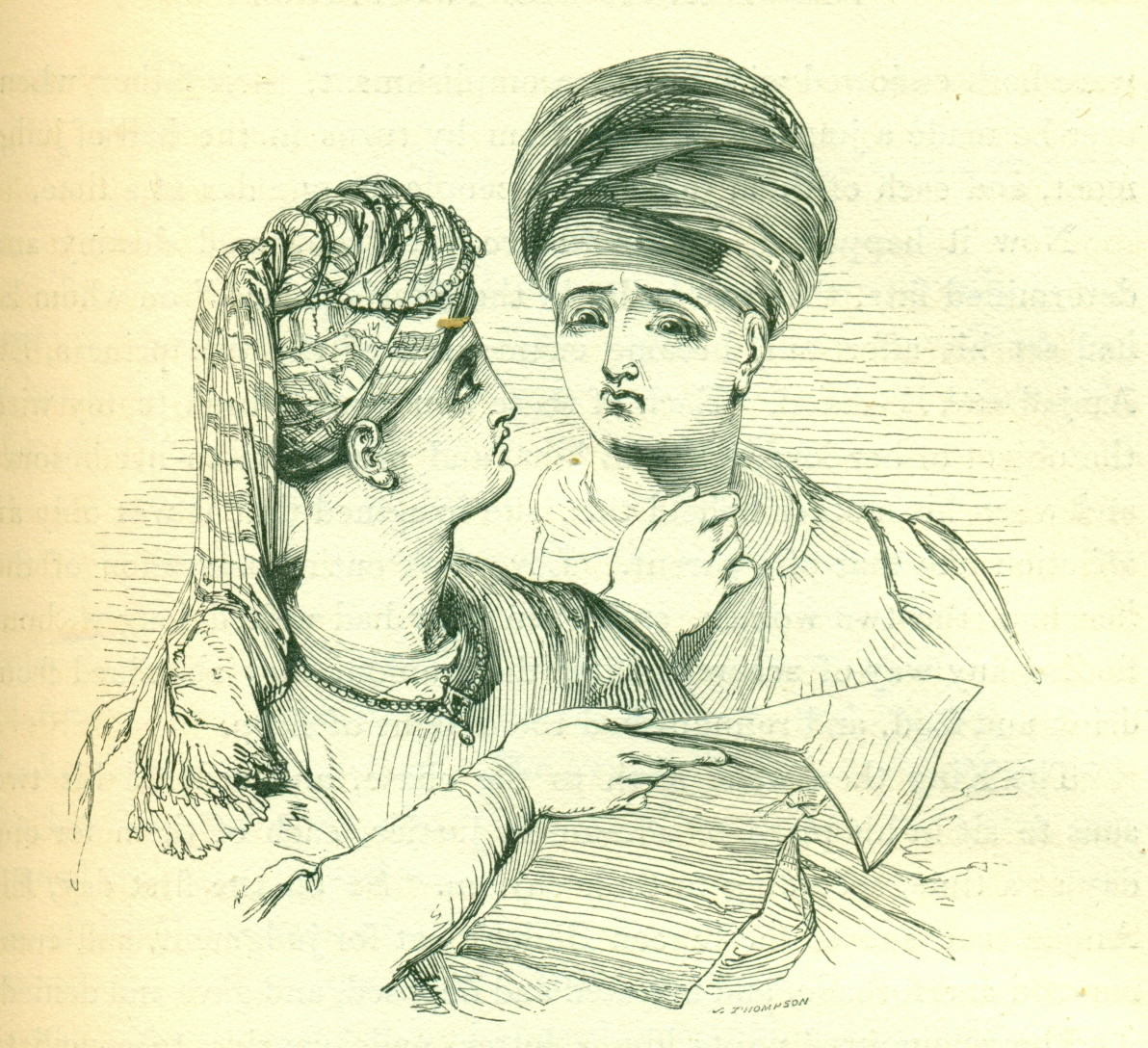
Illustration to The Story of the Two Princes El-Amjad and El-As'ad

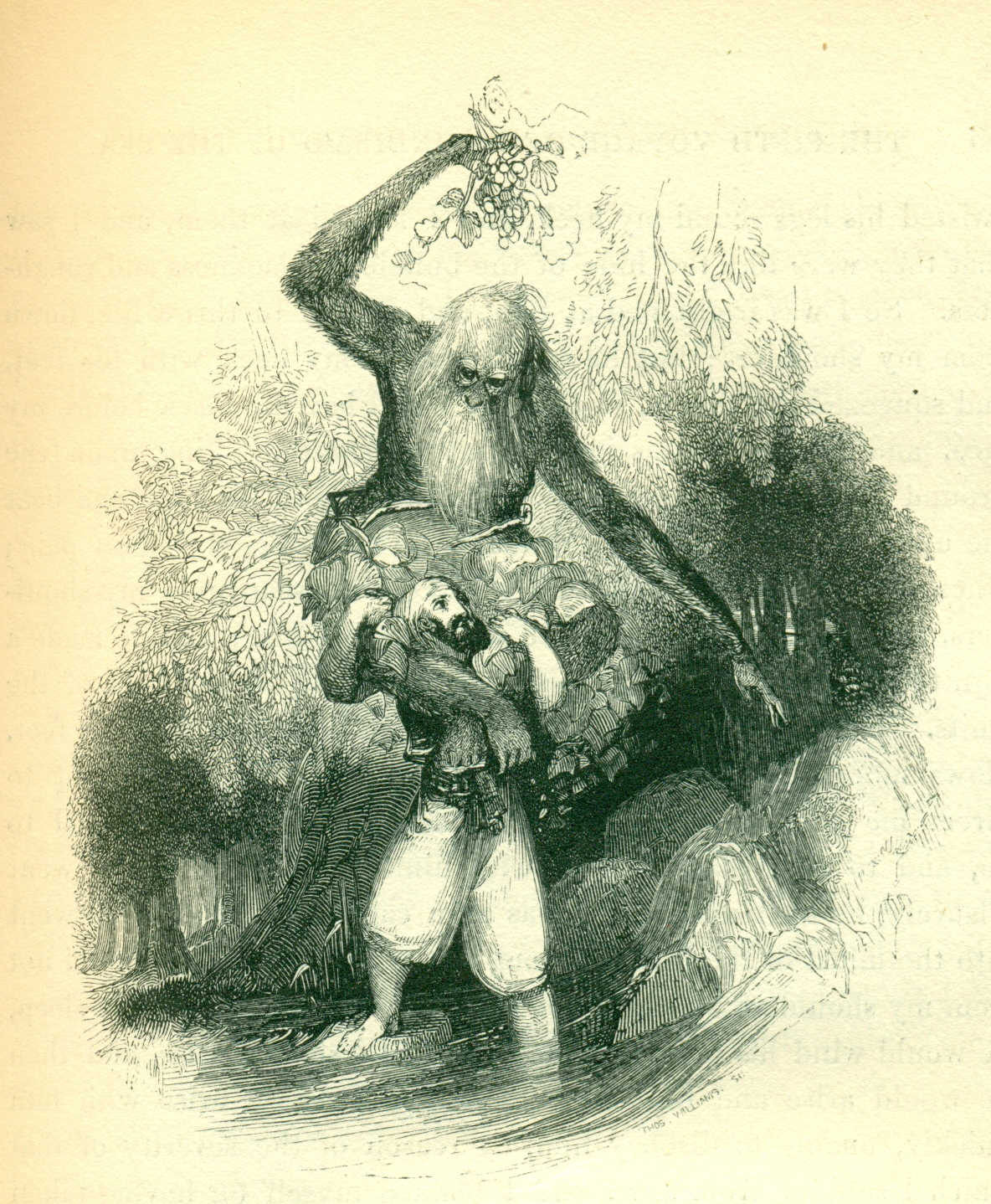
Illustration to The Fifth Voyage of Es-Sindbad of the Sea

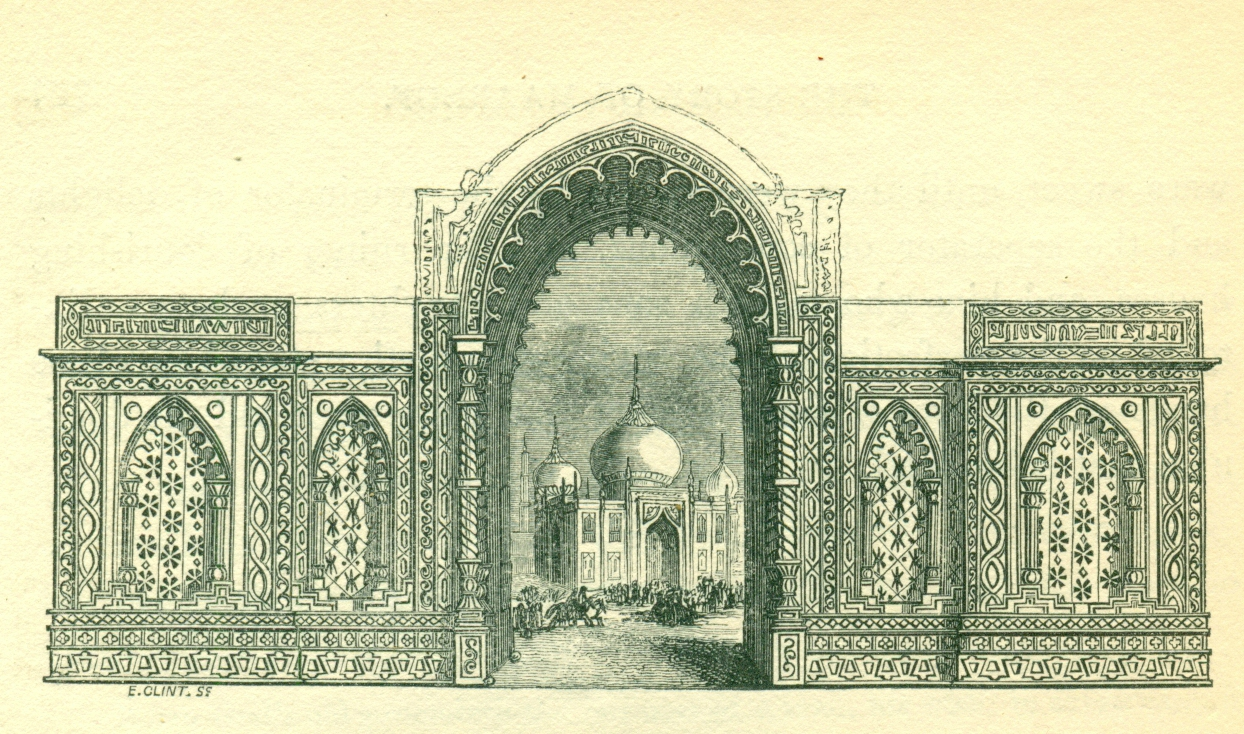
Illustration in notes to The Story of Maaroof

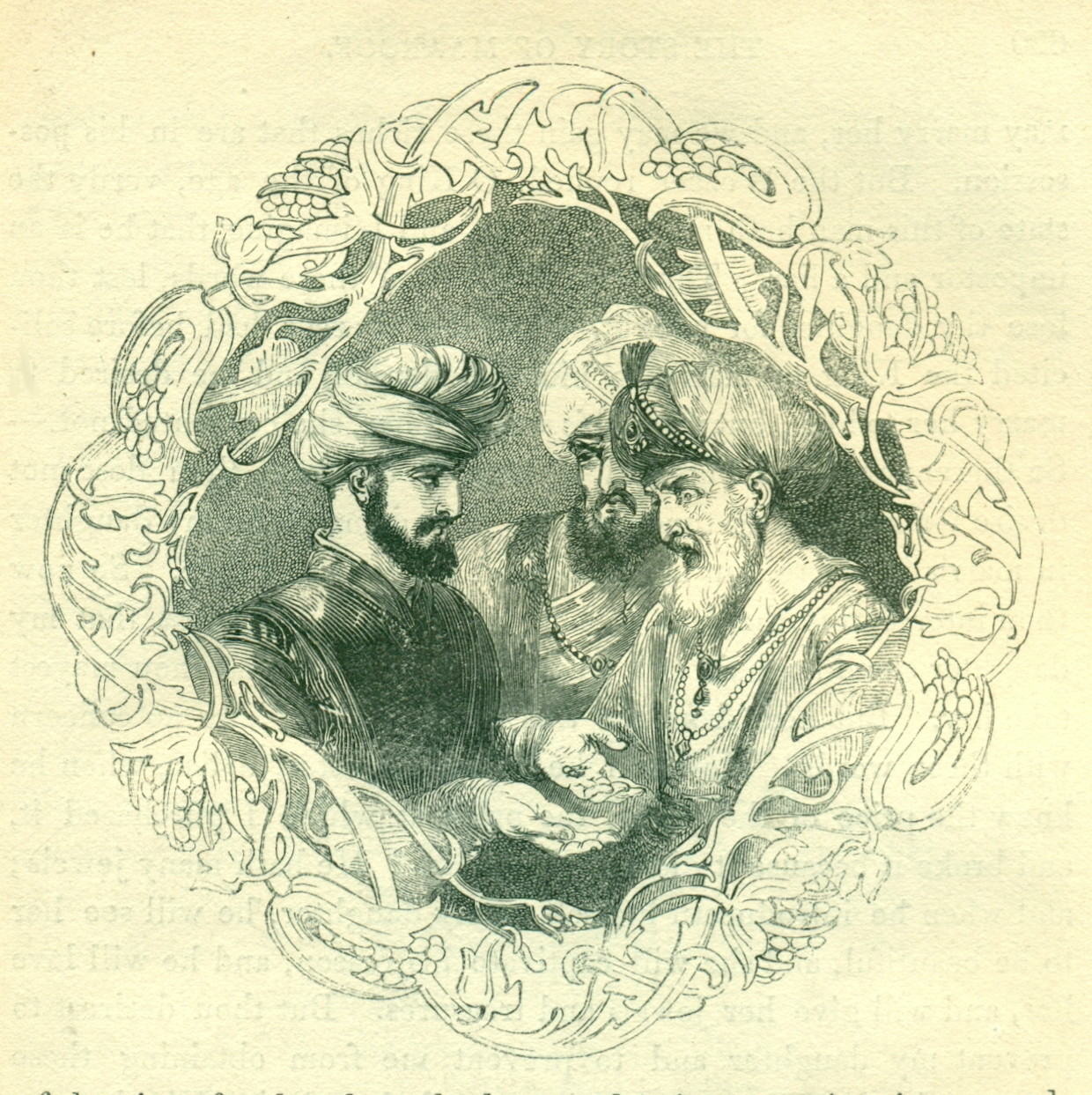
Illustration to The Story of Maaroof

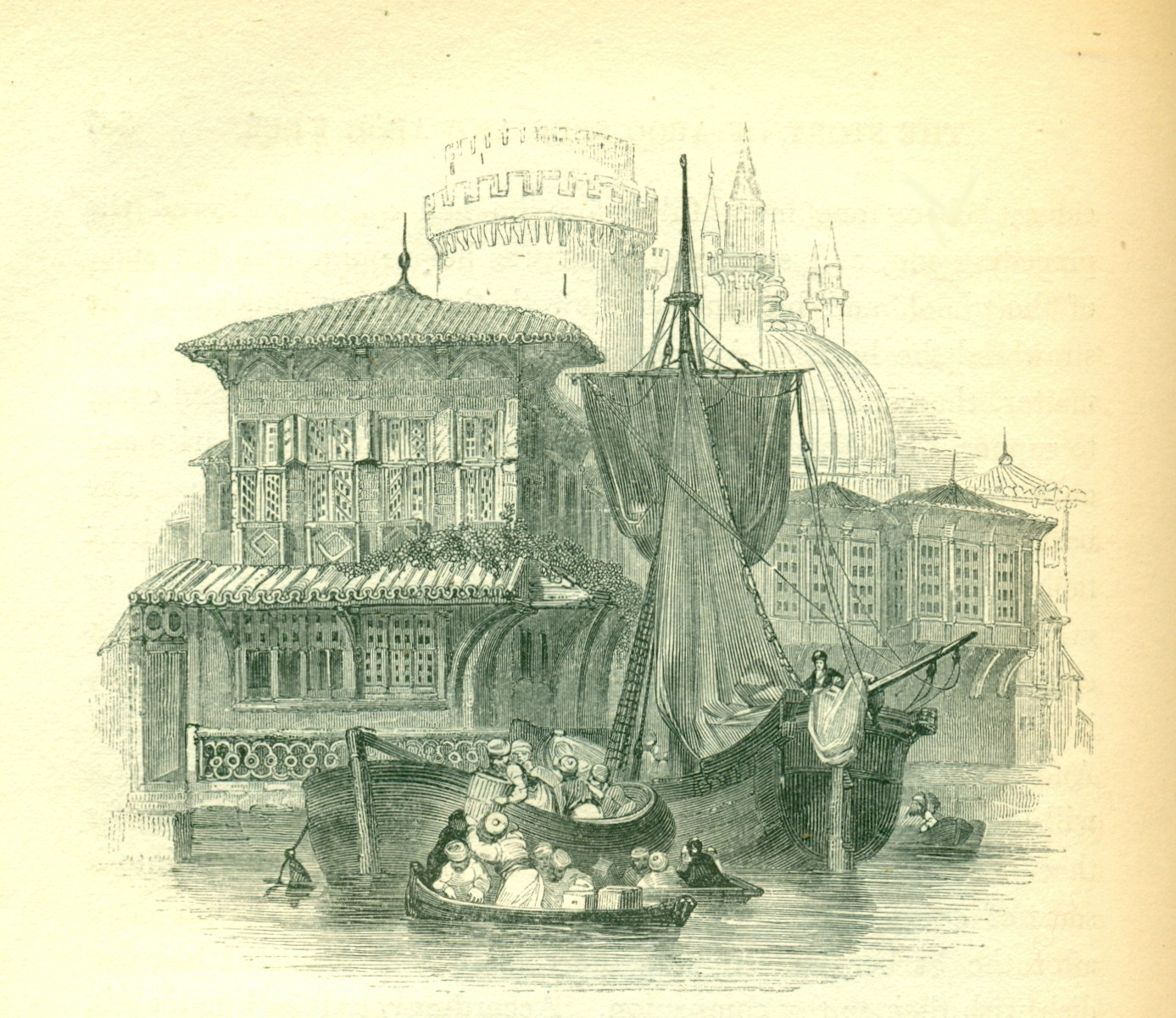
Illustration to The Story of Aboo Seer and Abipp (sp) Keer

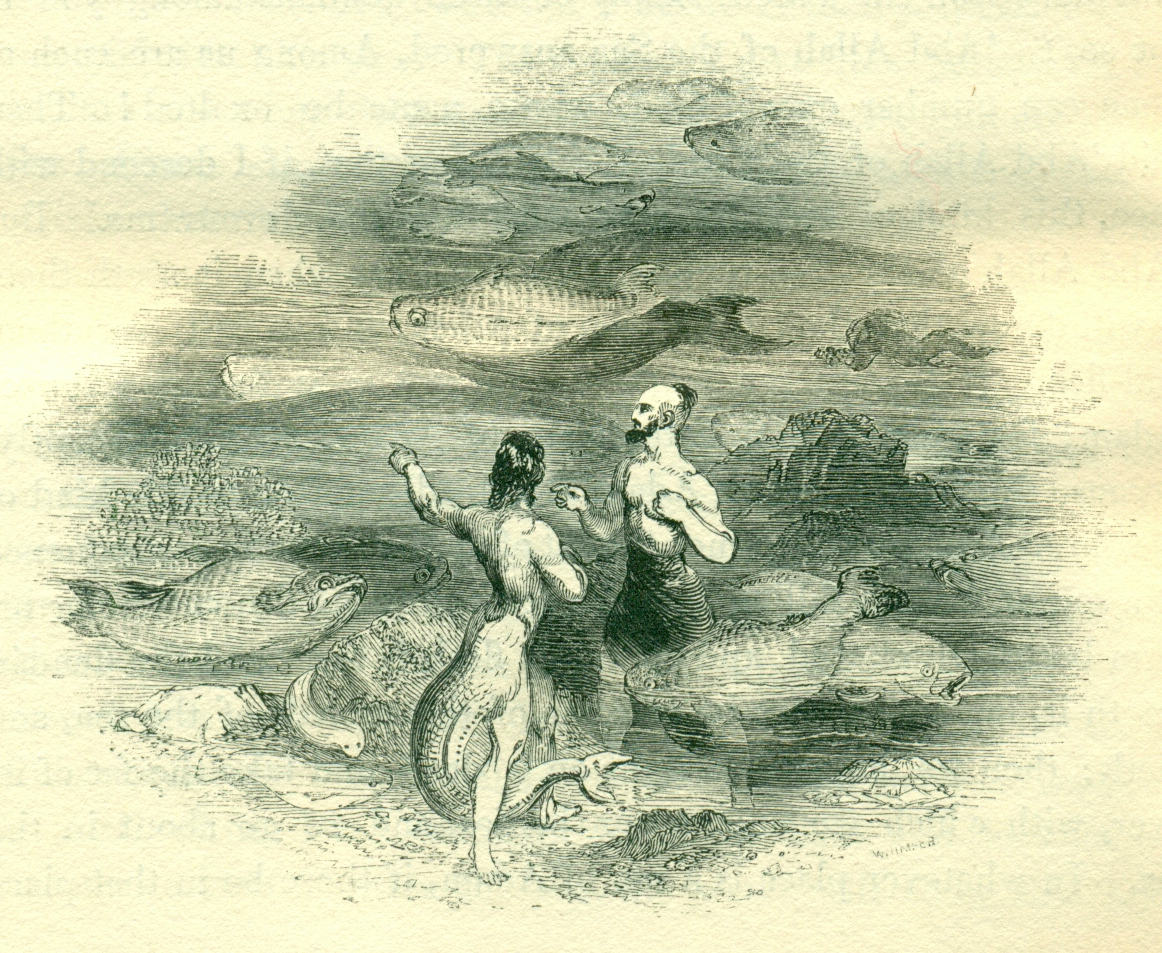
Illustration to The Story of Abd Allah of the Land ...

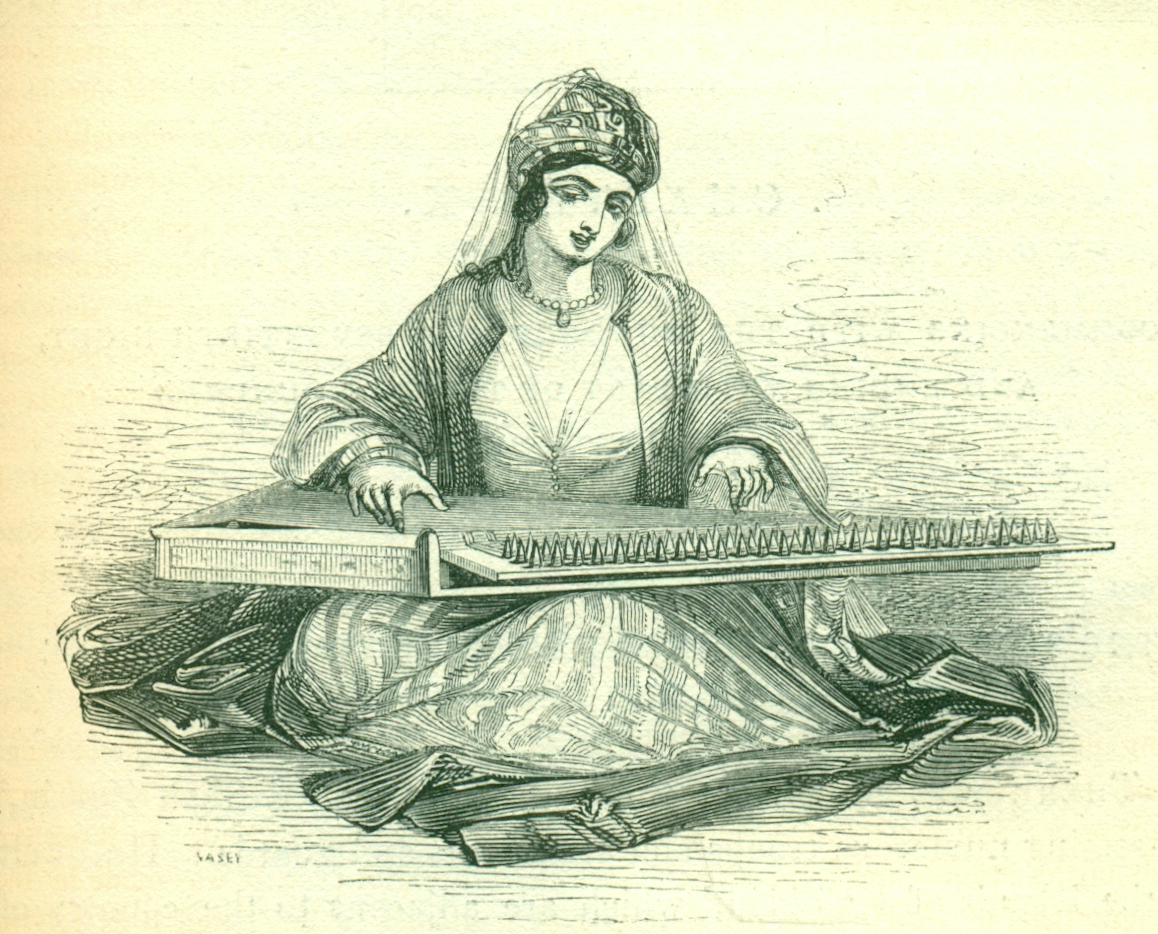
Illustration in notes to chapter IX

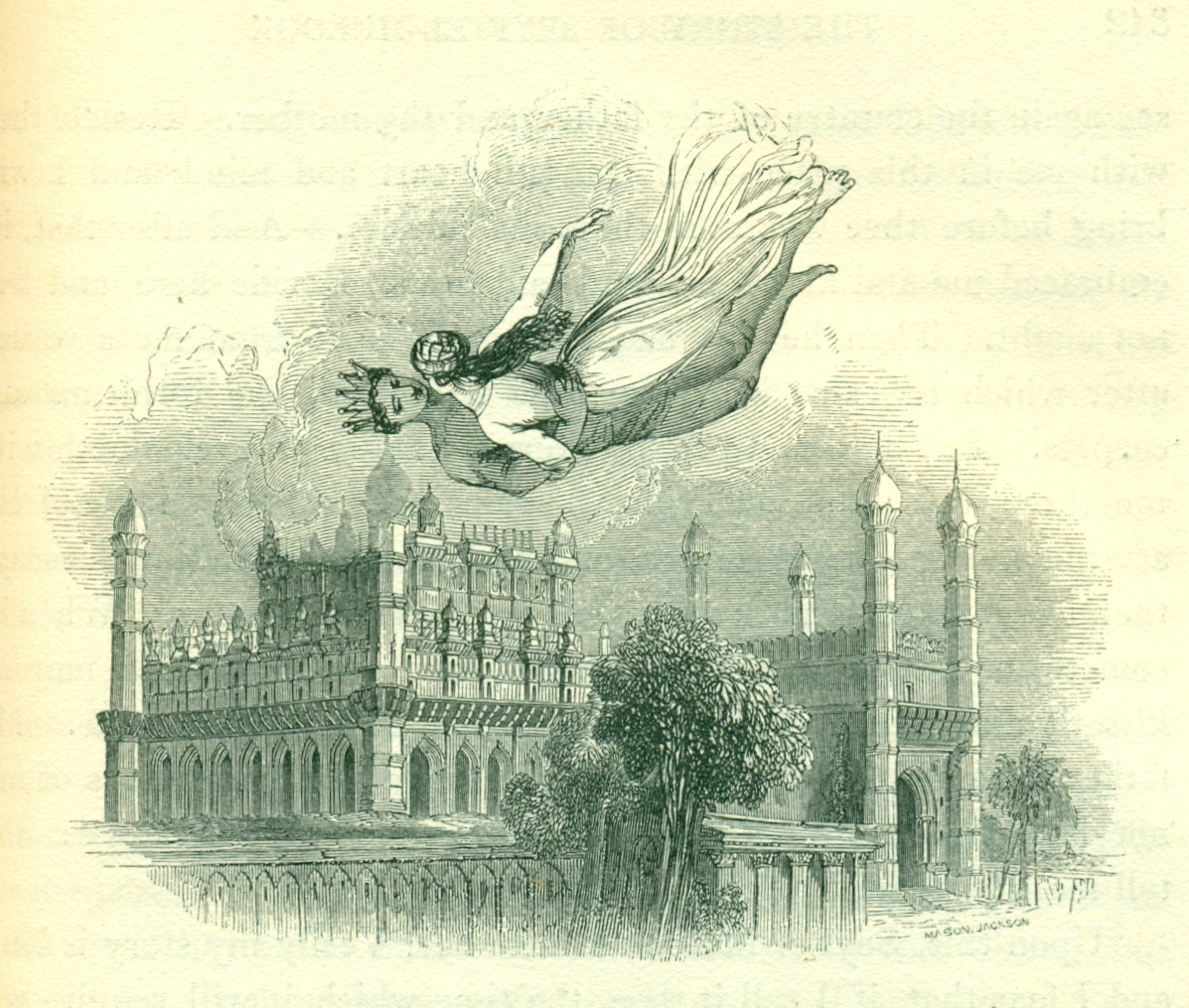
Illustration to The Story of Seyf El-Mulook and Bedeea El-Jemal

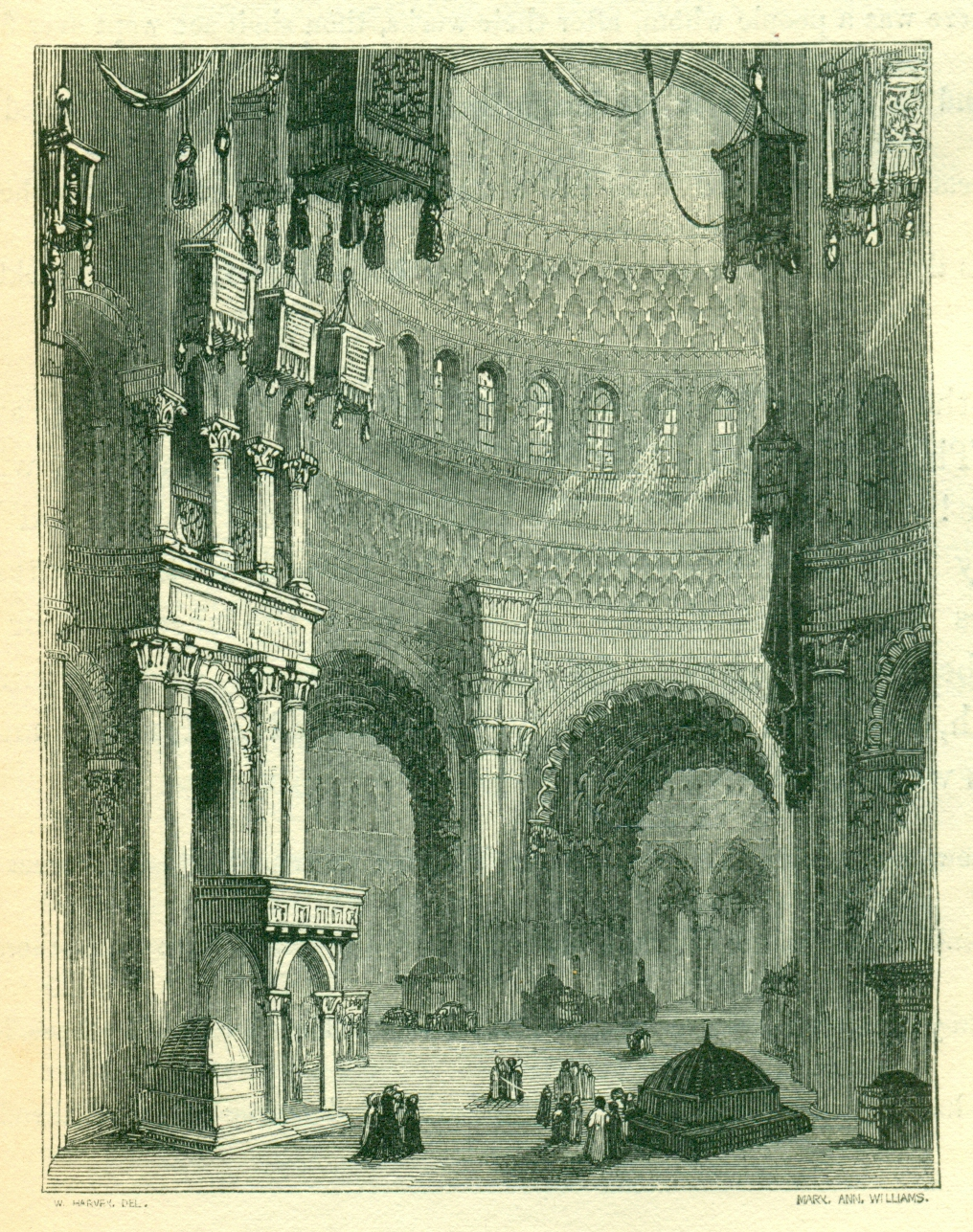
Illustration to The Story of the City of Brass

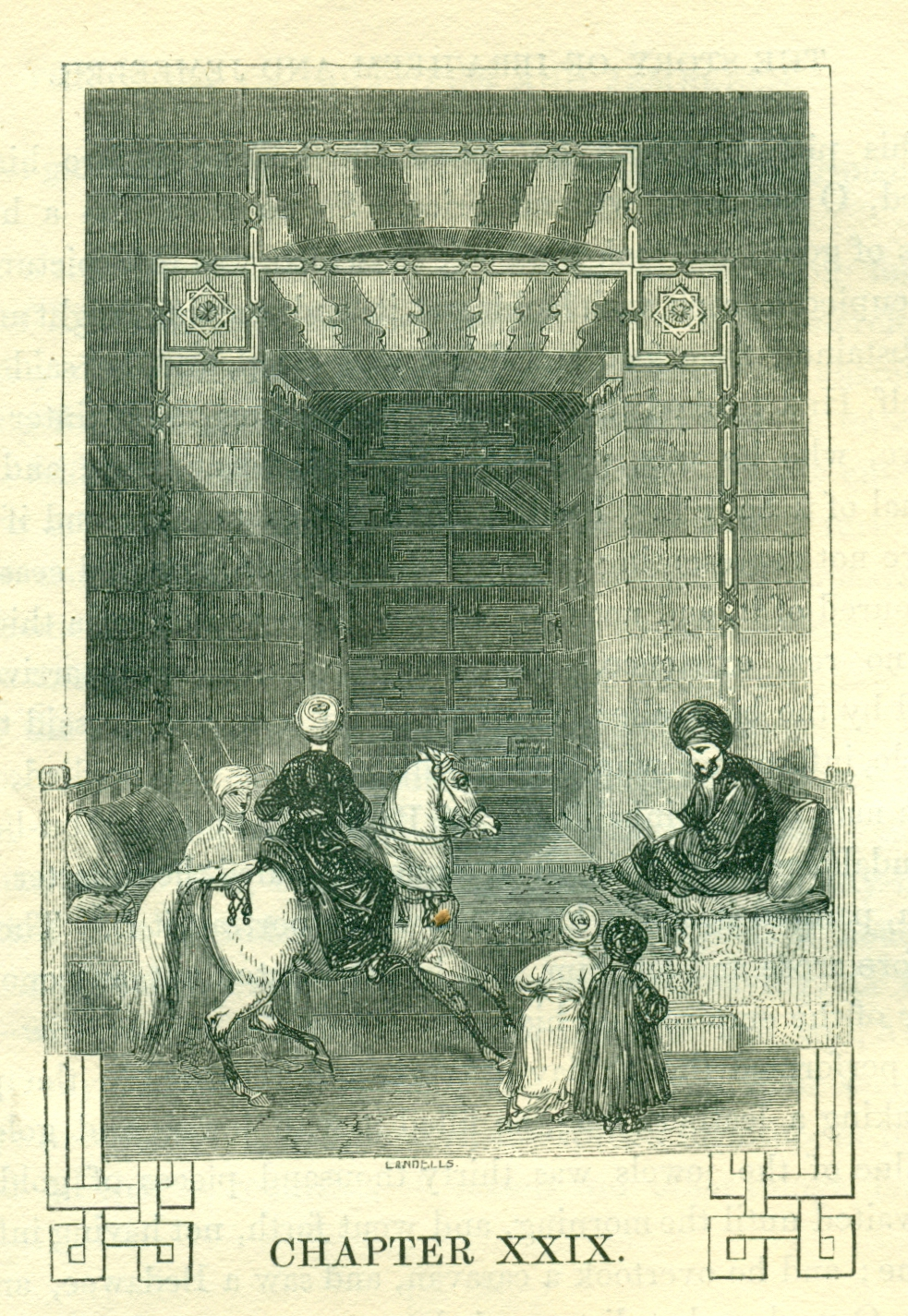
Illustration to The Story of Ibra'heem and Jemeeleh

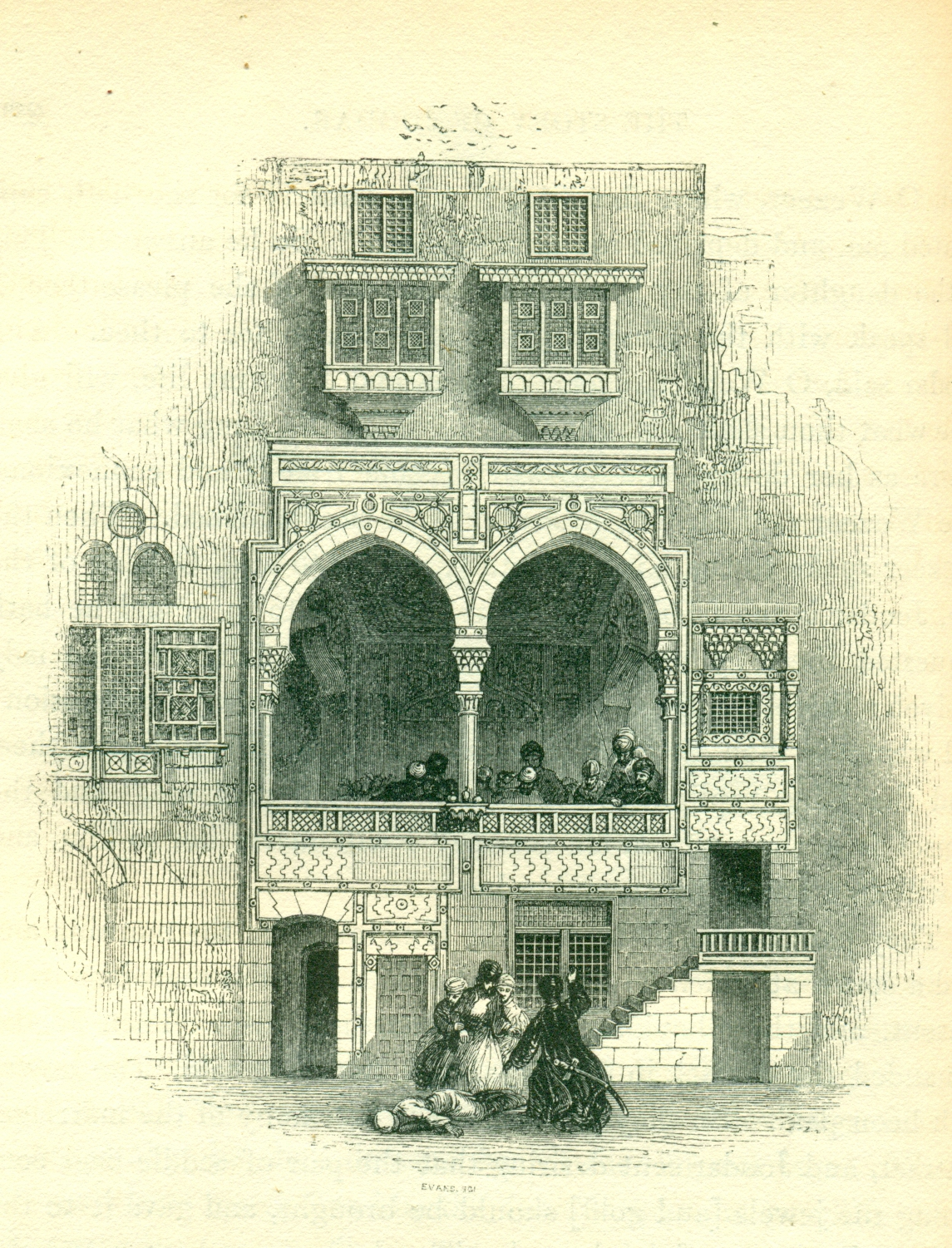
Illustration to The Story of Joodar

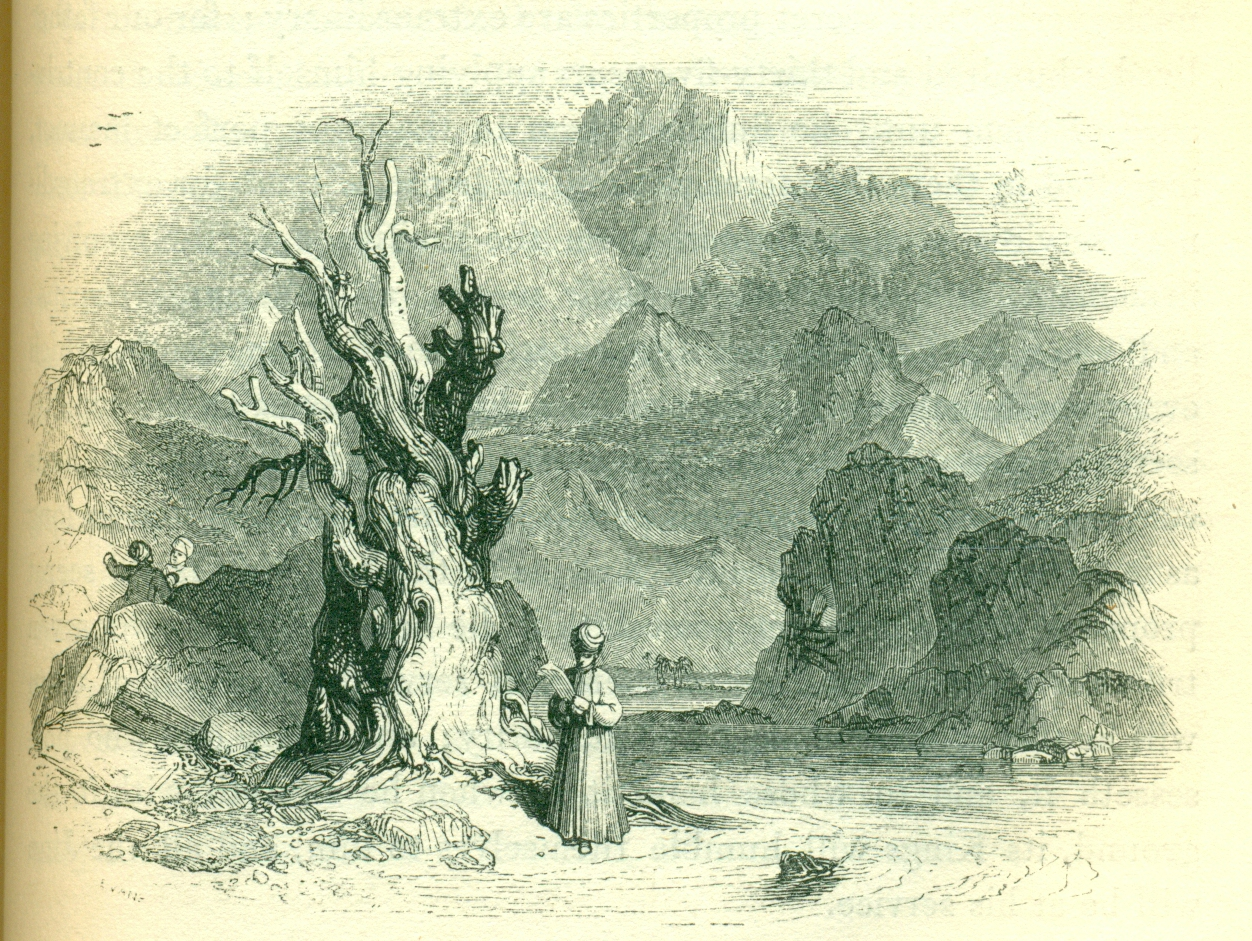
Illustration to The Story of Hasan of El-Basrah

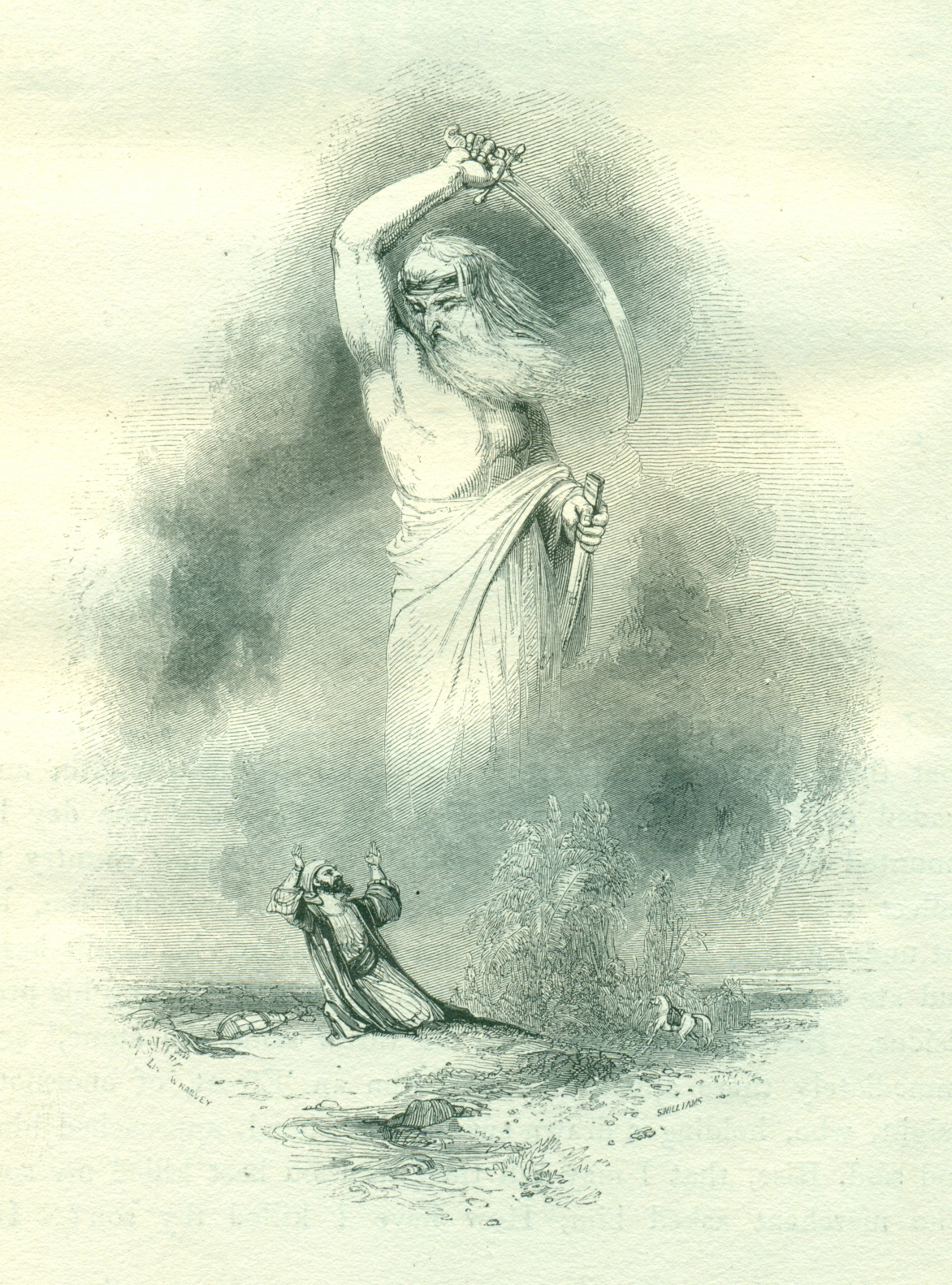
Illustration to The Story of the Merchant and the Jinnee

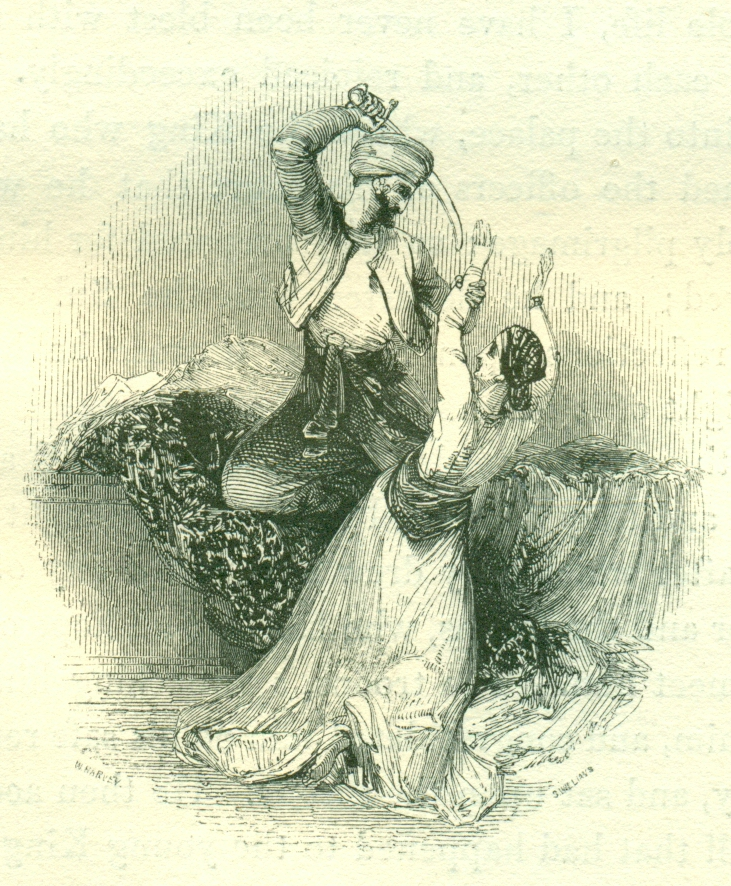
Illustration to The Story ... of the Black Islands

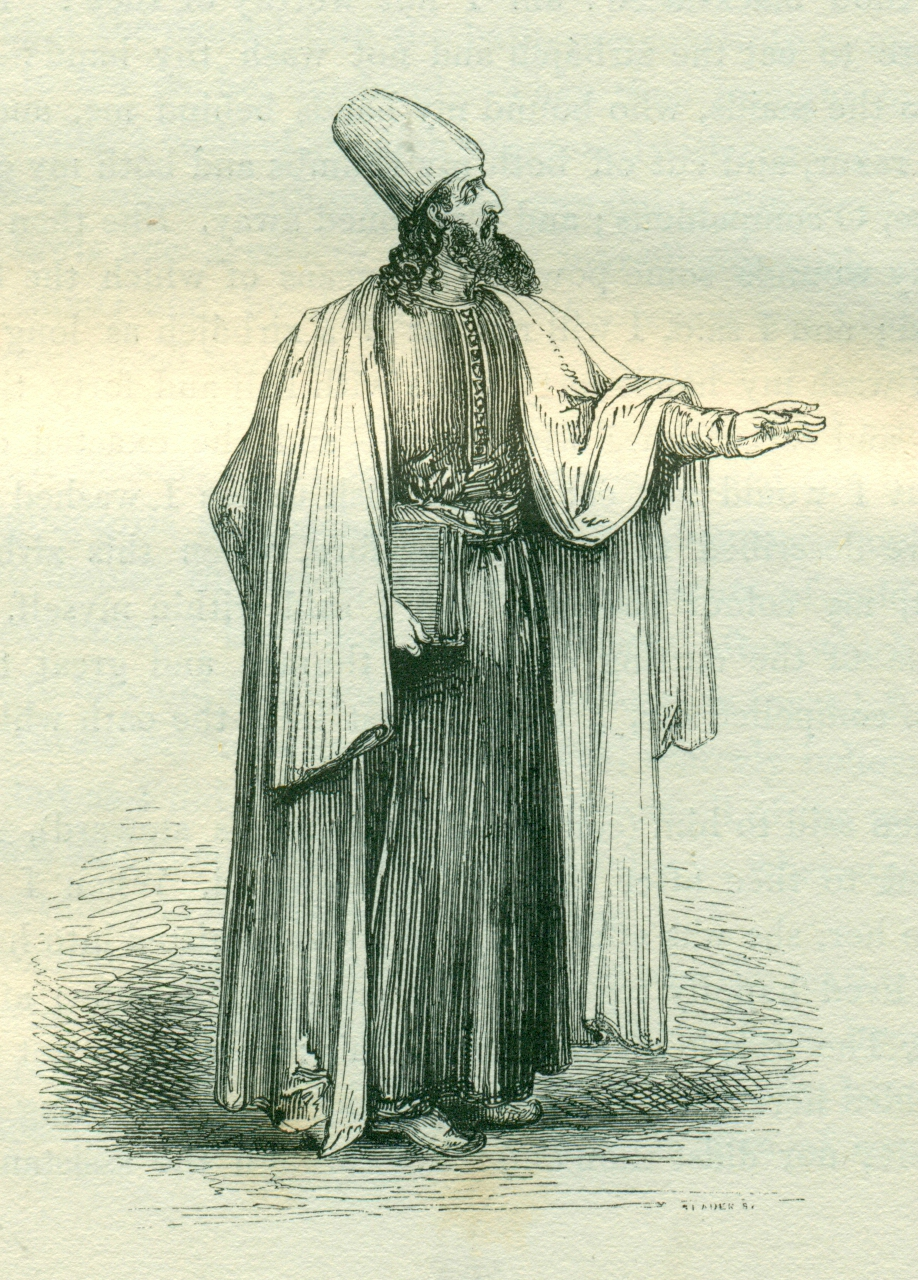
Illustration to The Story told by the Sulta'n's Steward

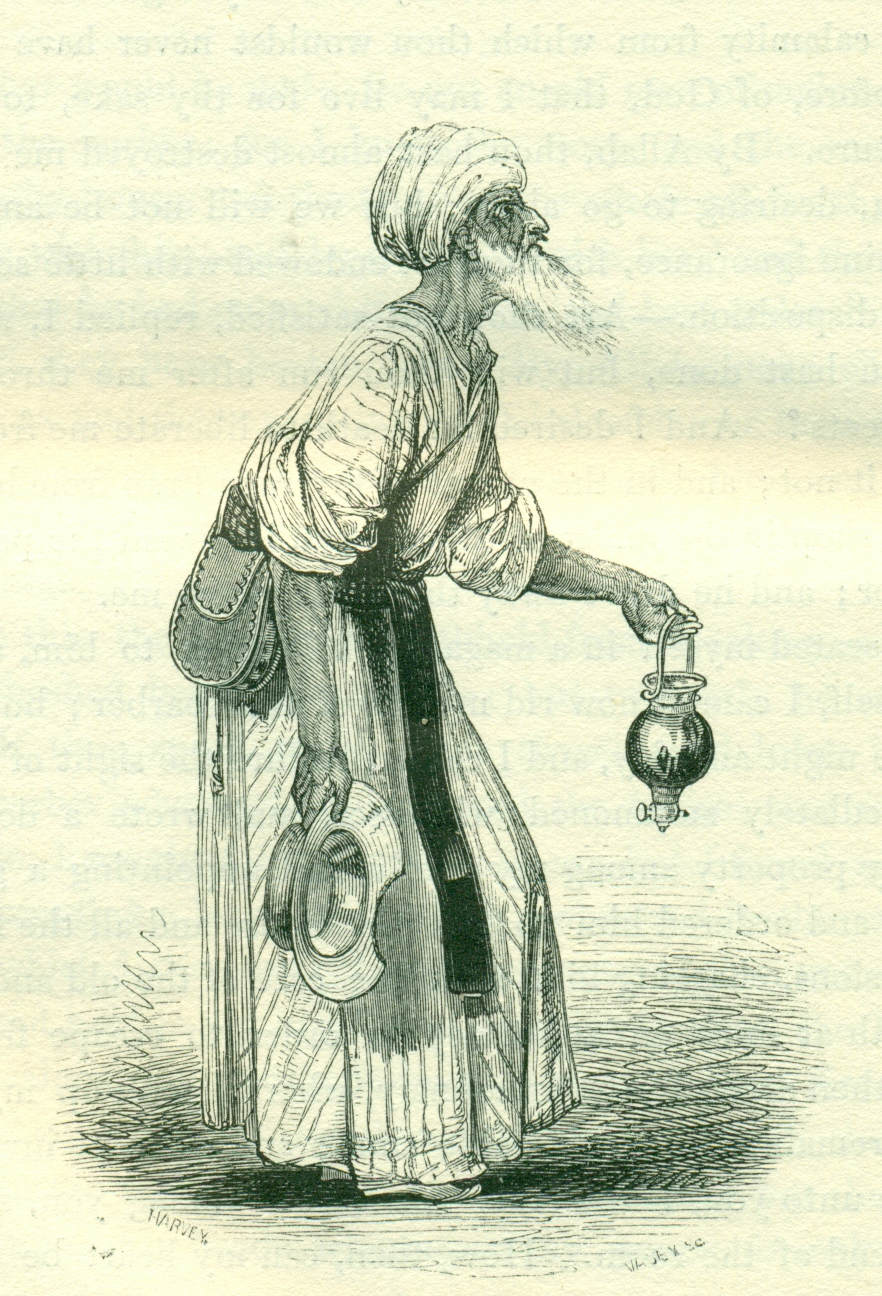
Illustration to The Story told by the Tailor
