= Allen Robert Branston =

English wood-engraver (1778–1827)

Allen Robert Branston (1778–1827) known more generally as Robert Branston, was a British wood-engraver.

== Life ==
Branston was the son of a general copper plate engraver and heraldic painter, born at Lynn, Norfolk in 1778. He was apprenticed to his father, and when in his nineteenth year settled at Bath, where he practised both as a painter and engraver. He came to London in 1799, and after a while devoted himself to wood-engraving, in which branch of the art of engraving he was self-taught. Branston died at Brompton in 1827. The engravers Robert Edward Branston and William Frederick Branston were his sons.

== Works ==
He was employed mainly on book illustration, after the designs of John Thurston and others. He soon became the head of his profession in London, where nothing equal to Thomas Bewick and his pupils had been produced before his arrival. With Bewick he was always in rivalry, yet, though he was no designer and some twenty-three years the junior of the Newcastle master, he may claim to be the founder of the 'London school' of wood-engraving, and to some extent to share with Bewick the credit of raising the character of his art in England. He specially excelled in engraving figures and interiors, but was less successful in outdoor scenes.

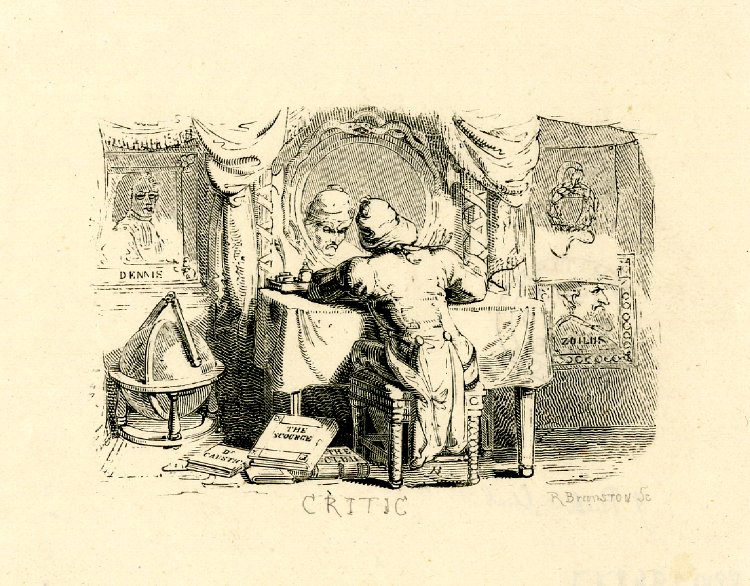
The Critic, 1817 book illustration by Branston.

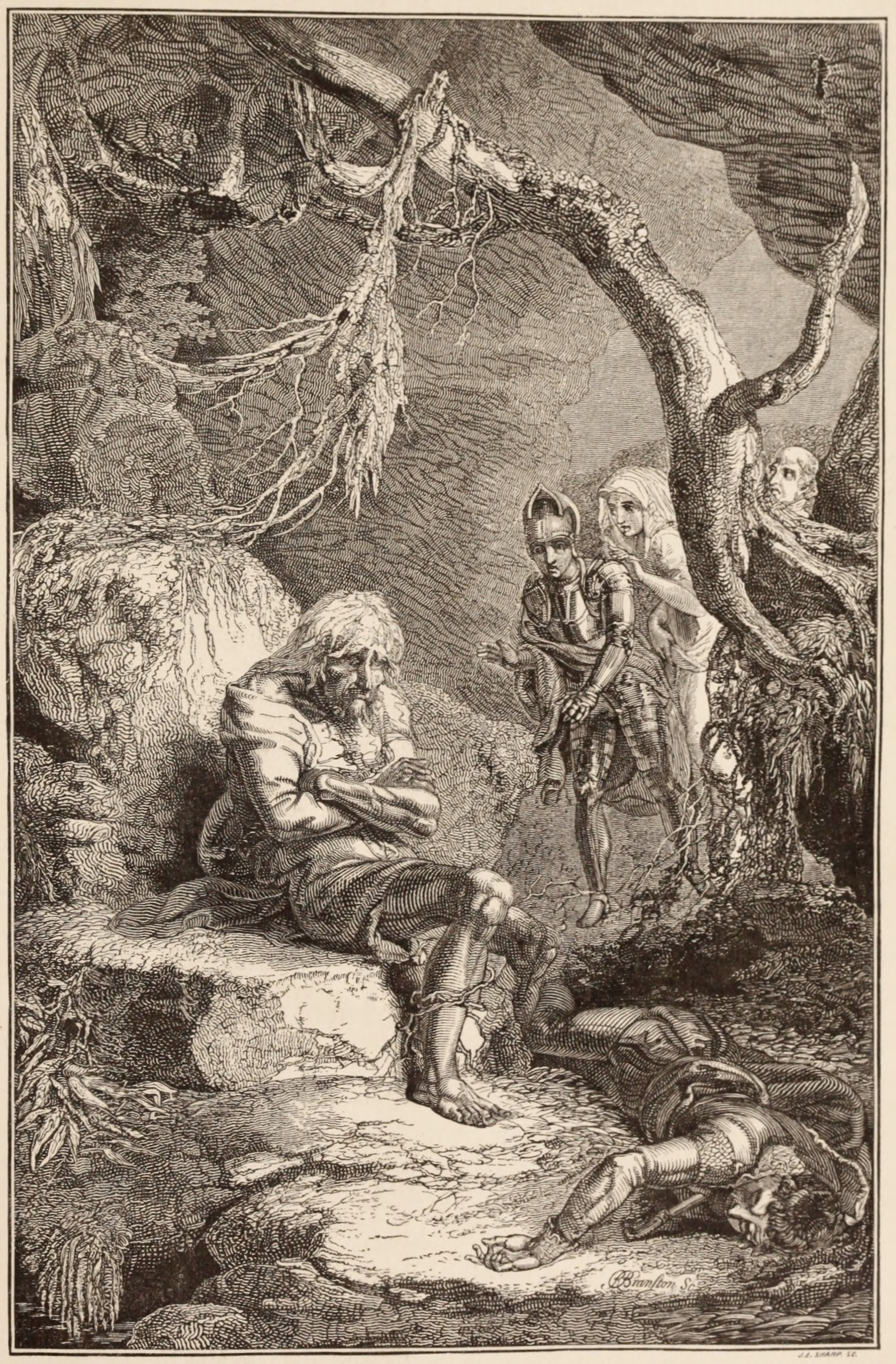
The Cave of Despair. by Branston

The 'Cave of Despair,' after Thurston, in William Savage's Practical Hints on Decorative Printing, 1822, is generally considered his best plate, and shows his skill both in 'white' and 'black' line. Amongst the works illustrated in whole or in part by him were edition of David Hume's The History of England published by Wallis and Scholey, 1804–10; Robert Bloomfield's Wild Flowers, 1806; and poems by George Marshall, 1812. He had many pupils, including John Thompson (1785–1866). The work of Branston and Thompson can be compared in the illustrations to James Puckle's The Club, 1817. Branston projected a volume of fables in rivalry with those of Bewick after designs by Thurston, but after a few of them were cut he abandoned the enterprise. He also engraved a few cuts of birds to show his superiority to the Newcastle engraver; but though beautifully cut, they were essentially inferior to Bewick's.
