= Annual International Exhibition =

Annual exhibition held in London

Coordinates: 51.4972°N 0.1765°W

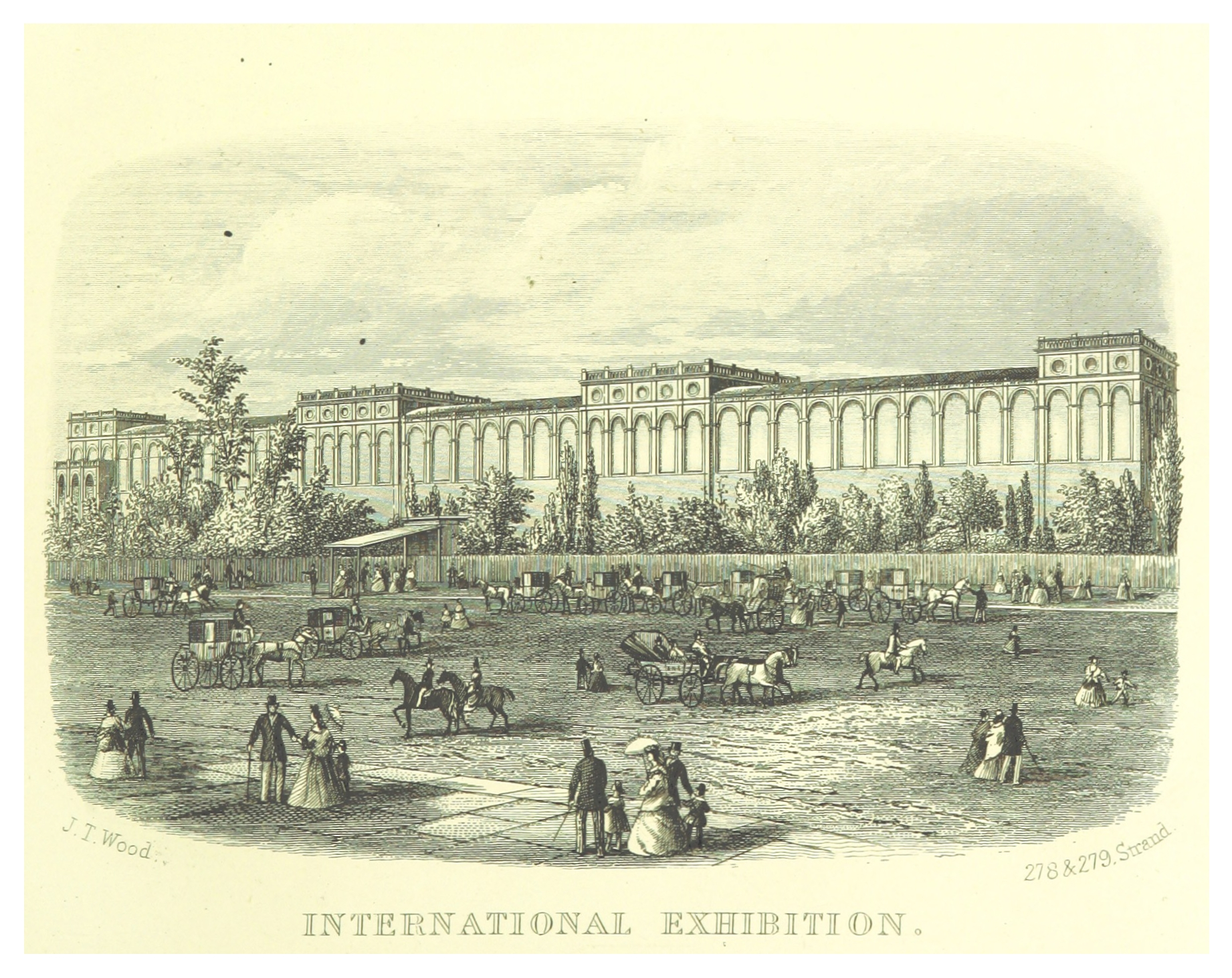
The International Exhibition building, 1872

The Annual International Exhibition was a yearly event held in South Kensington, London, United Kingdom between 1871 and 1874. It was preceded by the 1851 Great Exhibition of the Works of Industry of All Nations and the 1862 International Exhibition in London, as well as many international exhibitions that been held in various countries since 1851.

It was intended to be a series of 10 annual events. The first received over a million visitors and made a profit, but the subsequent three had fewer visitors and all made a loss.

Details of the 1873 Exhibition, officially described as the London Annual International Exhibition of all fine arts, industries, and inventions, are quoted in this source.

== Colonial exhibitions ==
Colonial contributions to the annual international exhibitions in London were primarily contained in the Queensland annex. For the colonies to contribute to the annual international exhibitions in London, there needed to be more space for them to be able to set up their exhibitions. This required the construction of a new building. This new building needed funds to be built and kept in top condition throughout the years. Hence every colony that participated in the exhibition within the Queensland Annex would be asked to donate funds based on the amount of their earnings. In the first year, only three colonies took part in the Queensland annex, these being New South Wales, South Australia, and Victoria. During the London exhibition in 1873, the colonial exhibitions were not primarily focused on presenting recent technological developments of the current year, which was typical of nations during annual exhibitions. Instead, the colonial exhibitions favored artworks that depicted how the colonies lived and/or were perceived to have lived and their popular exports. This section of the annual international exhibitions in London, which enabled colonies to participate in the exhibitions, continued running until the exhibition was no longer open. All of the colonies that held exhibitions in the Queensland annex after 1873 followed in the footsteps of the first three colonies presenting primarily artworks about daily life in the colonies and their popular exports.

== Indian exhibitions ==
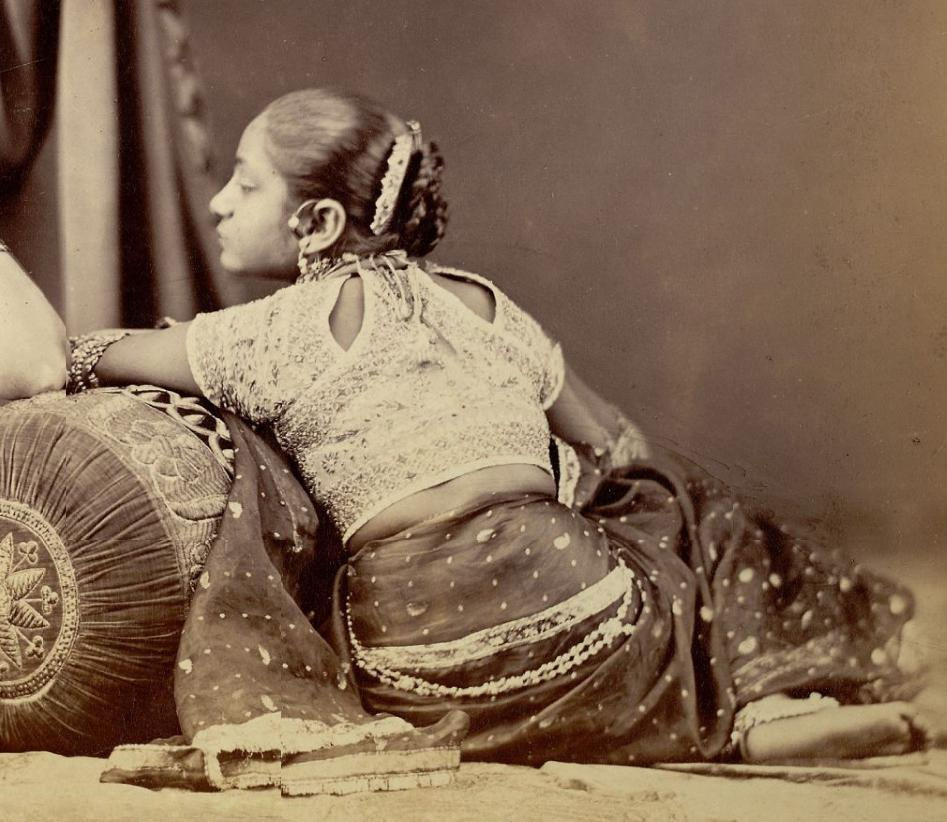
A model wearing jewelry from India at the 1872 exhibition

Unlike the colonies, India was present all four years that the annual international exhibition in London was active. However, unlike the colonies that depicted the general life of the colonies and kept a similar theme throughout the years, the exhibitions that represented India had a different theme/subject each year. In chronological order, these themes of the Indian portion of the exhibitions were woolens/pottery, jewelry, silks, and leather objects. The London Exhibition of 1871 was popular among the general public. In 1872 the exhibition had a theme of showing jewelry from India. The jewelry presented was not limited to certain classes of Indian society. Instead, the exhibition of 1872 showed pieces that were worn by both sexes from all economic classes. The third exhibition in 1873, was heavily focused on presenting Indian silks. The silks that were shown during the exhibition were both plain and embroidered. During the final year of the international annual exhibition in London, the primary theme of the Indian portion was leather-made objects. However, while each year of the annual exhibition had a theme, the exhibitions representing India were not limited to said themes. During every annual exhibition, there was a large amount of Indian artwork shown. These artworks included ornaments, miniatures, carvings, and embroideries made of inlaid wood, metalworks, ivory, and onyx. These exhibitions were presented in a location known as an Indian court.

The 1874 exhibition featured heavy use of the Royal Albert Hall. The Daily Telegraph noted that the "whole" of Gottlieb Wilhelm Leitner's collections were brought to the Hall for the exhibition. These items included "Graeco-Buddhist sculptures, Bactrian coins, and rare manuscripts".
