= John Thurston (artist) =

British printmaker and illustrator (1774–1822)

- Born: 1774; Scarborough, England
- Died: 1822 (aged 47–48); London, England
- Occupations: Printmaker, illustrator

John Thurston (1774–1822) was a British printmaker and illustrator.

Thurston began his artistic career as a copper plate engraver, working for James Heath. Then he took up book illustration, and soon totally devoted himself to it. Most of his illustrations were engraved on block, not plate; a writer in the Polytechnic Journal was later to describe him as "at that time the principal, and indeed almost only artist of any talent in London who made drawings on the block for wood engravers".

His illustrations include those for James Thomson's Seasons and William Somervile's Rural Sports, as well as Shakespeare's works. He was an occasional exhibitor at the Royal Academy from 1794 to 1812.

He died in London, in 1822.
