= List of Steeleye Span members =

Members of British folk rock band

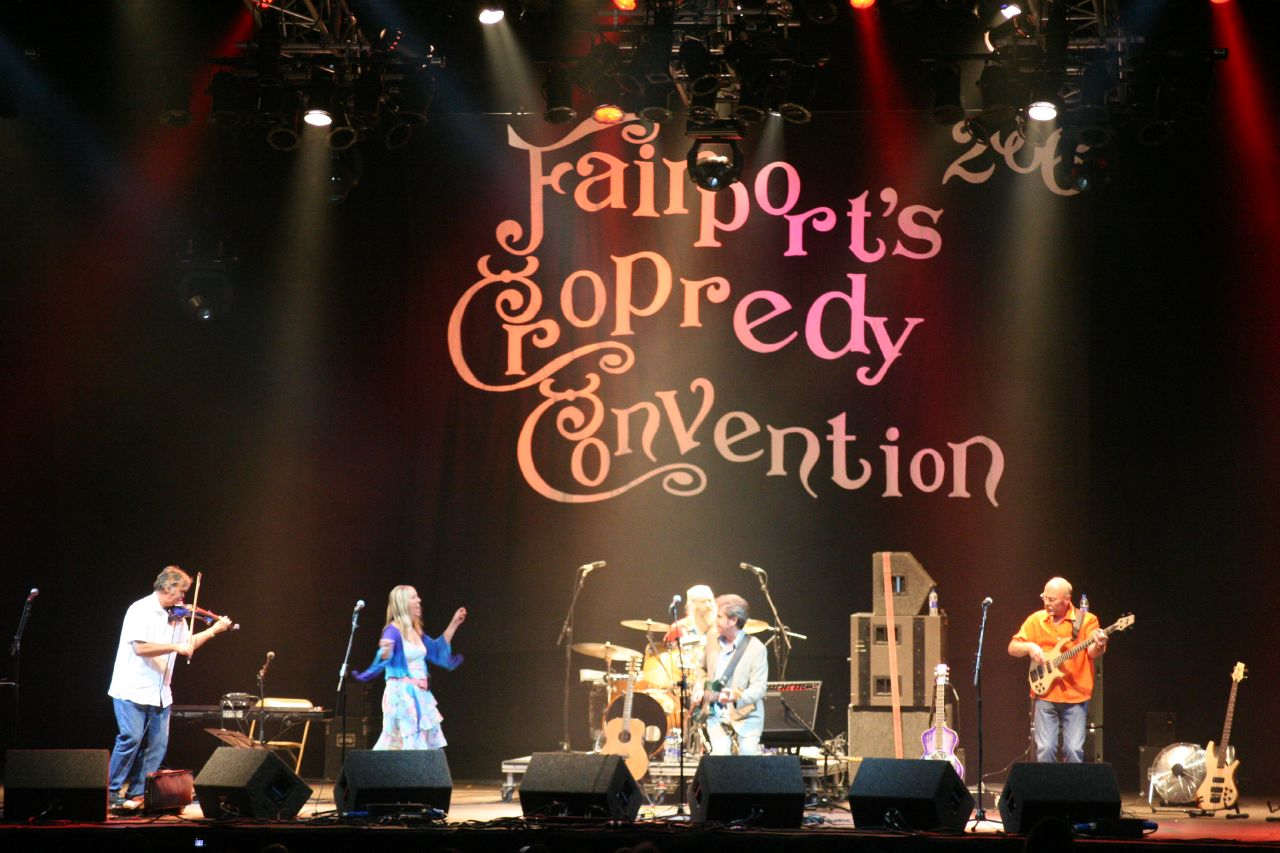
(left to right) Peter Knight, Maddy Prior, Liam Genockey, Ken Nicol and Rick Kemp.

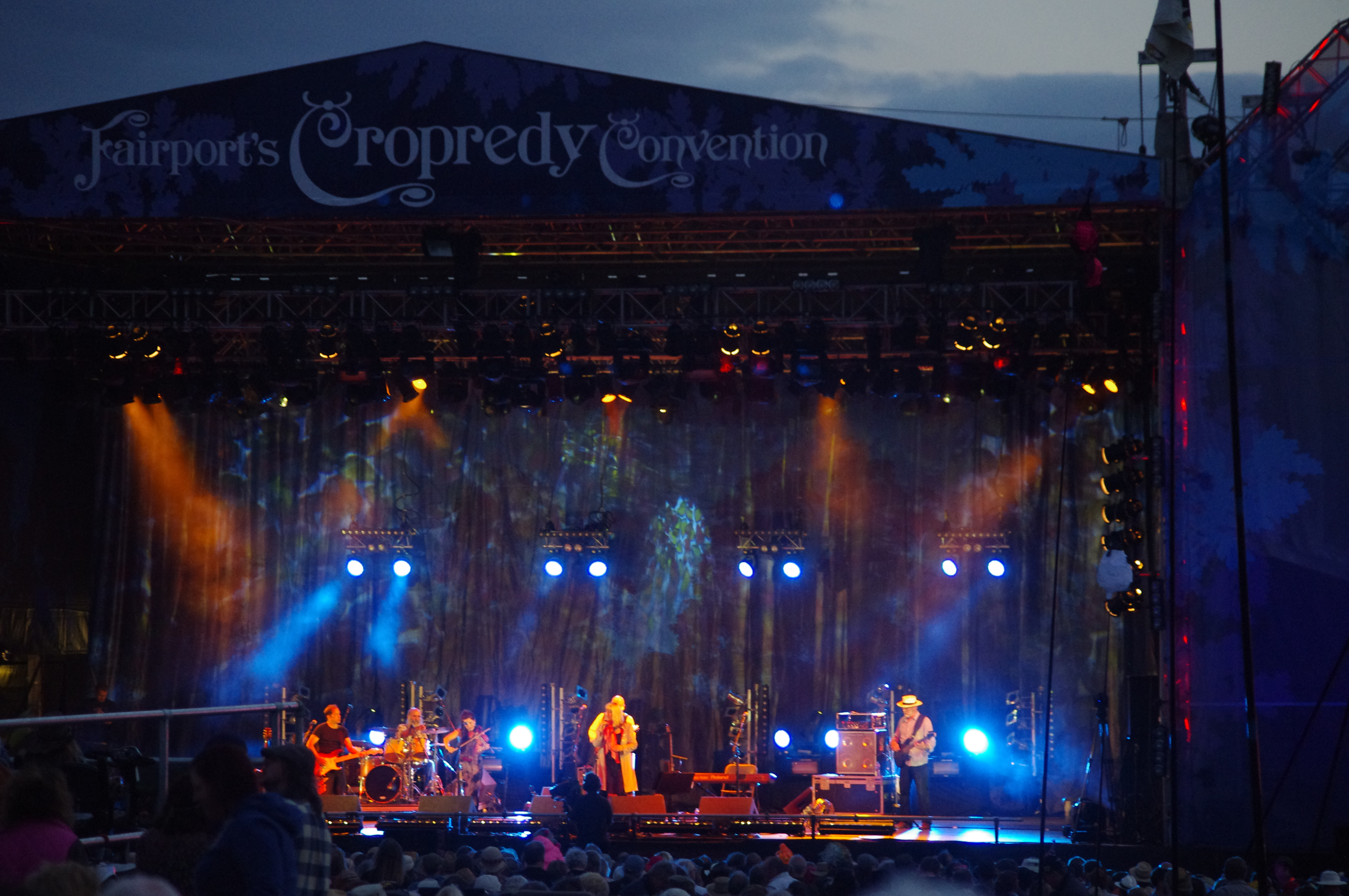
(left to right) Julian Litman, Liam Genockey, Jessie May Smart, Maddy Prior, Spud Sinclair (obscured) and Rick Kemp

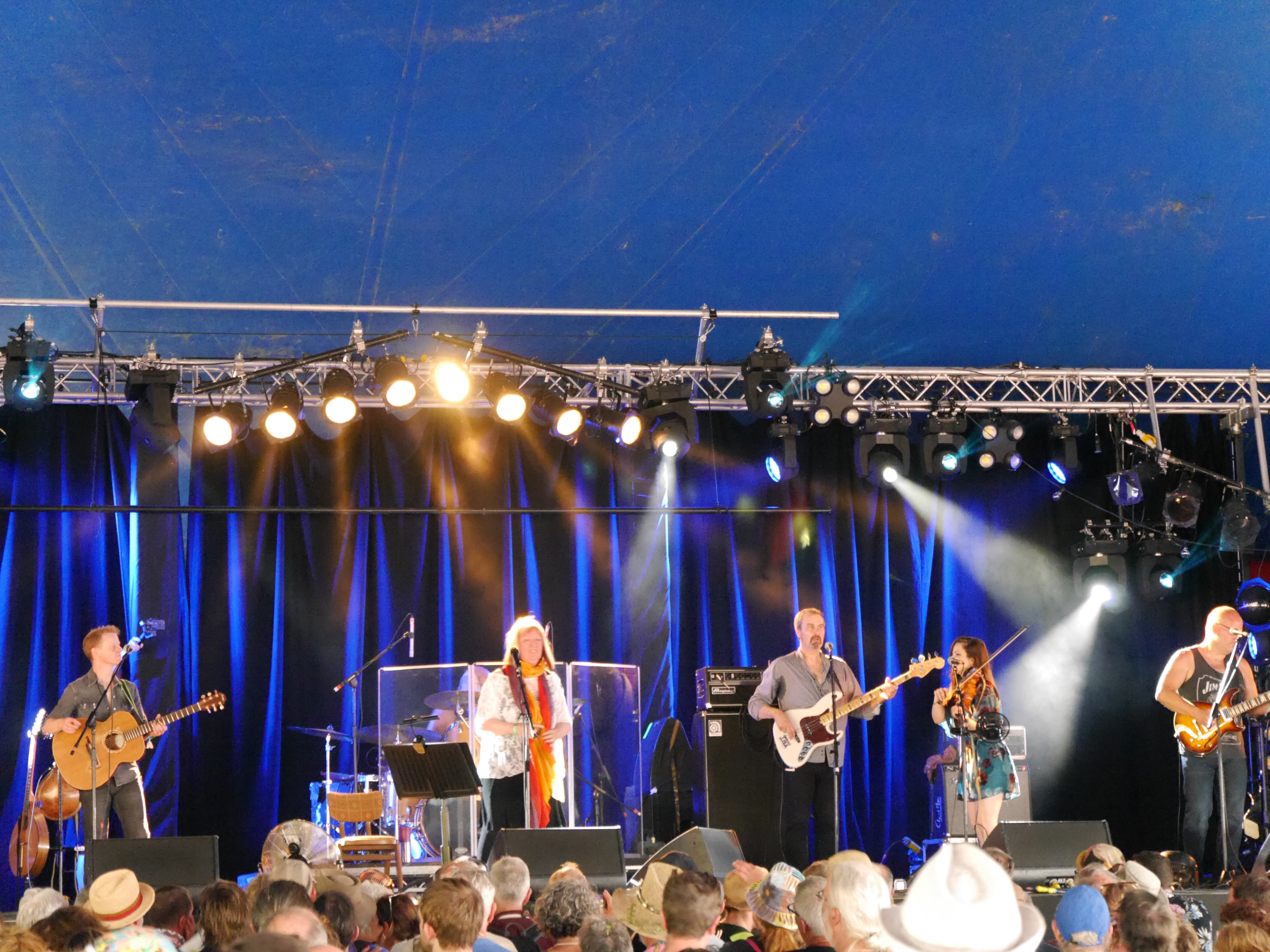
(left to right) Benji Kirkpatrick, Liam Genockey (obscured), Maddy Prior, Roger Carey, Jesse May Smart and Spud Sinclair, (Julian Littman not shown).

Three line-ups of Steeleye Span performing in 2006, 2016 and 2019.

Steeleye Span is a British folk rock band formed by bassist Ashley Hutchings after he left Fairport Convention in 1969, the original line-up also included duo Tim Hart (guitar, mandolin, vocals) and Maddy Prior (vocals) and husband and wife team Terry Woods (guitar, concertina, mandolin, vocals) and Gay Woods (vocals, bodhran, concertina, autoharp). The current line-up includes Prior, alongside drummer Liam Genockey (who first joined in 1989), multi-instrumentalist Julian Littman (since 2010), violinist Jessie May Smart (since 2014), guitarist Andrew "Spud" Sinclair (since 2015), bassist Roger Carey (since 2017) and second violinist Violeta Vicci (since 2019)

== History ==
Steeleye Span began in late 1969, when London-born bass player Ashley Hutchings left Fairport Convention, the band he had co-founded in 1967. Fairport had been involved in a road accident in 1969 in which the drummer, Martin Lamble, and guitarist Richard Thompson's girlfriend, Jeannie Franklyn, were killed and other band members injured. The survivors convalesced in a rented house near Winchester in Hampshire and worked on the album Liege & Lief. Despite the success of the album, Ashley Hutchings and the band's vocalist Sandy Denny left Fairport Convention.

Hutchings' new band was formed after he met established duo Tim Hart and Maddy Prior on the London folk club scene, and the initial line-up was completed by husband and wife team Terry Woods (formerly of Sweeney's Men, later of The Pogues) and Gay Woods. The name Steeleye Span comes from a character in the traditional song "Horkstow Grange." Martin Carthy gave Hart the idea to name the band after the song character. When the band discussed names, they decided to choose among the three suggestions "Middlemarch Wait", "Iyubidin's Wait", and "Steeleye Span". Although there were only five members in the band, six ballots appeared and "Steeleye Span" won. Only in 1978 did Hart confess that he had voted twice. The liner notes for their first album include thanks to Carthy for the name suggestion.

With two female singers, the original line-up was unusual for the time, and indeed, never performed live, as the Woodses departed the band shortly after the release of the group's debut album, Hark! The Village Wait (1970). While recording the album, the five members were all living in the same house, an arrangement that produced considerable tensions particularly between Hart and Prior on the one hand and the Woodses on the other. Terry Woods maintains that the members had agreed that if more than one person departed, the remaining members would select a new name, and he was upset that this did not happen when he and Gay Woods left the band. Gay and Terry were replaced by veteran folk musician Martin Carthy and fiddler Peter Knight in a longer-term line-up that toured small concert venues, recorded a number of BBC Radio Sessions, and recorded two albums – Please to See the King (1971) and Ten Man Mop, or Mr. Reservoir Butler Rides Again (1971). While the first album was traditionally performed – guitars, bass and with two guest drummers – Please to See the King was revolutionary in its hard electric sound and lack of drums.

In 1971, the then Steeleye Span line-up minus Maddy Prior contributed to two songs on Scottish folk musician Ray Fisher's album The Bonny Birdy; Martin Carthy and Ashley Hutchings were also involved in the selection and arrangement of some songs released on this album, whilst Ashley Hutchings wrote the sleeve notes. Furthermore, Martin Carthy and Peter Knight performed on four songs released on Roy Bailey's eponymous debut album in 1971.

Shortly after the release of their third album, the band brought in manager Jo Lustig, who brought a more commercial sound to their recordings. At that time, traditionalists Carthy and Hutchings left the band to pursue purely folk projects. Their replacements were electric guitarist Bob Johnson and bass player Rick Kemp, who brought strong rock and blues influences to the sound. Rick Kemp subsequently married Maddy Prior and they had two children before divorcing. Their daughter Rose Kemp and their son Alex (who performs as Kemp) both followed their parents into the music industry.

Lustig signed them to the Chrysalis record label, for a deal that was to last for ten albums.

With the release of their fourth album, Below the Salt, later in 1972, the revised line-up had settled on a distinctive electrified rock sound, although they continued to play mostly arrangements of very traditional material, including songs dating back a hundred years or more. Even on the more commercial Parcel of Rogues (1973), the band had no permanent drummer but, in 1973, rock drummer Nigel Pegrum, who had previously recorded with Gnidrolog, The Small Faces and an early incarnation of Uriah Heep, joined them, to harden up their sound (as well as occasionally playing flute and oboe). Also that year the single "Gaudete" from Below the Salt became a Christmas hit single, reaching number 14 in the UK Singles Chart.

Their sixth album (and sixth member Pegrum's first with the band) was entitled Now We Are Six. Produced by Jethro Tull's Ian Anderson, the album includes the epic track "Thomas the Rhymer", which has been a part of the live set ever since. Although successful, the album is controversial among some fans for the inclusion of nursery rhymes sung by "The St. Eeleye School Choir" (band members singing in the style of children), and the cover of "To Know Him Is to Love Him", featuring a guest appearance from David Bowie on saxophone.

The attempts at humour continued on Commoners Crown (1975), which included Peter Sellers playing electric ukulele on the final track, "New York Girls". Their seventh album also included the epic ballad "Long Lankin" and novelty instrumental "Bach Goes To Limerick". With their star now conspicuously ascendant, the band brought in producer Mike Batt to work on their eighth album, All Around My Hat, and their biggest success came with the release of the title track as a single – it reached number 5 in the UK Singles Chart in late 1975. The single was also released in other European countries and gave them a breakthrough in the Netherlands and Germany.

The follow-up album, Rocket Cottage (1976), also produced by Batt, proved to be a commercial flop, despite having much in common musically with its predecessor. The opening track, "London", was penned by Rick Kemp as a follow-up to "All Around My Hat", in response to a request from the record label that Kemp describes as "we'll have another one of those, please", and released as a single. The song failed to make the UK Chart, in complete contrast to "All Around My Hat", despite having much in common – a 12/8 time signature, upbeat tempo, solo verses and full harmony chorus. Rocket Cottage also included the experimental track "Fighting for Strangers" (with sparse vocals singing concurrently in a variety of keys) and, on the final track, excerpts of studio banter between the band members and a seemingly impromptu rendition of "Camptown Races", in which Prior gets the lyrics wrong.

At the time of their seventh album, Commoners Crown, the advent of punk saw the mainstream market turning away from folk rock almost overnight, heralding a downturn in commercial fortunes for the band. While they never regained the commercial success of All Around My Hat, Steeleye remained popular among British folk rock fans and generally respected within the music industry. It has been widely reported that Peter Knight and Bob Johnson left the band to work on another project together, The King of Elfland's Daughter.

Their departure left a significant hole in the band. For the 1977 album, Storm Force Ten, early member Martin Carthy rejoined on guitar. When he originally joined the band for their second album, Carthy had tried to persuade the others to bring John Kirkpatrick on board but the band had chosen Knight instead. This time, Carthy's suggestion was accepted and Kirkpatrick's accordion replaced Knight's fiddle, which gave the recording a very different texture from the Steeleye sound of previous years. This line-up also recorded their first album outside of the studio, Live at Last, before a "split" at the end of the decade that proved to be short-lived. Carthy and Kirkpatrick had only intended to play with the band for a few months and had no interest in a longer association.

The band were contractually obliged to record a final album for the Chrysalis label and, with Carthy and Kirkpatrick not wanting to rejoin the re-formed band, the door was open for Knight and Johnson to return, in 1980. The album Sails of Silver saw the band moving away from traditional material to a greater focus on self-penned songs, many with historical or pseudo-folk themes. Sails was not a commercial success, in part because Chrysalis chose not to promote the album aggressively but also because many fans felt uncomfortable with the band's new direction in its choice of material. The failure of the album left Hart unhappy enough that he decided to leave the band. He later gave up commercial music entirely, in favour of a reclusive life in the Canary Islands.

After Sails of Silver there were to be no new albums for several years, and Steeleye became a part-time touring band. The other members spent much of their time and energy working on their various other projects and the band went into a fitful hibernation. "Sails of Silver" was used as a theme song for the science fiction literary show "Hour of The Wolf", on NYC radio station WBAI 99.5FM since the 1980s. This introduced many younger US listeners to the band. After a quiet spell, the group's 12th studio album (and first without Tim Hart) Back in Line was released on the Flutterby label in 1986. With no "relaunch" as such, the band retained a low profile.

In 1989, two long-term members departed. One was bassist Rick Kemp, who needed to recover from a serious shoulder injury, exacerbated by playing bass on stage. His eventual replacement (after two tours, each with a different bassist) was Tim Harries, who was brought in less than two weeks before the band was scheduled to start a tour. A friend of Pegrum's, Harries was a self-taught rock bassist, as well as a classically trained pianist and double bassist. With Harries on board, Steeleye released Tempted and Tried (1989), an album that formed the basis for their live set for many years to come.

Not long after recording Tempted, drummer Nigel Pegrum emigrated to Australia for personal relationship reasons. He was replaced by eccentric drummer Liam Genockey (most recently of rock band Gillan), easily identified by his long, plaited beard. He and Knight were simultaneously members of "Moiré Music", a free-jazz band with a classical flavour, led by Trevor Watts.

In 1995 almost all the past and present members of the band reunited for a concert to celebrate the 25th Anniversary of the band (which was later released as The Journey). The only former members not present were founding members Terry Woods, Mark Williamson, and Chris Staines.

A by-product of this gig was founding vocalist Gay Woods rejoining the band full-time, partly because Prior was experiencing vocal problems and, for a while, Steeleye toured with two female singers and released the album Time 1996, their first new studio album in seven years.

There were doubts over the future of the band when Prior announced her departure in 1997, but Steeleye continued in a more productive vein than for many years, with Woods as lead singer, releasing Horkstow Grange (1998), and then Bedlam Born (2000). Fans of Steeleye's "rock" element felt that Horkstow Grange was too quiet and folk-oriented, while fans of the band's "folk" element complained that Bedlam Born was too rock-heavy. Woods received considerable criticism from fans, many of whom did not realise that she was one of the founding members and who compared her singing style unfavourably to Prior's. There was also disagreement among the band about what material to perform; Woods advocated performing old favourites such as "All Around My Hat" and "Alison Gross", while Johnson favoured a set that emphasised their newer material.

Liam Genockey had also left the band in 1997 and, on these albums, the drum kit was manned by Dave Mattacks, who was not an official member of the band.

Reported difficulties among band members saw a split during the recording of Bedlam Born. Woods reportedly was uncomfortable with the financial arrangements of the band, health problems forced Johnson into retirement, and drummer Dave Mattacks' period as an unofficial member came to an end. Rick Kemp resumed playing with the band as a guest replacing Bob Johnson for the Bedlam Born tour, with Harries switching to lead guitar. Woods then left after this tour.

For a while the band consisted of just Peter Knight and Tim Harries, plus various guest musicians, as they fulfilled live commitments. This was an uncertain time for the future of the band, and when Harries announced he was not keen to continue his role, even the willingness of Kemp to return to the line-up full-time was not enough to prevent an 18-month hiatus while Peter Knight and the band's manager, John Dagnell, considered whether it was worth continuing.

In 2002 Steeleye Span reformed with a "classic" line-up (including Prior), bringing an end to the uncertainty of the previous couple of years. Knight hosted a poll on his website, asking fans which Steeleye songs they most wanted to see the band rerecord. Armed with the results, Knight persuaded Prior and Genockey to rejoin, coaxed Johnson out of a health-induced retirement and, along with Kemp and Knight, they released Present—The Very Best of Steeleye Span (2002), a 2-disc set of new recordings of the songs.

Bob Johnson's health issues prevented him from playing live, shortly before the 2002 comeback tour, and he was replaced at the eleventh hour on guitar by Ken Nicol, formerly of the Albion Band. Nicol had been talking with Rick Kemp about forming a band, when Kemp invited him to play for the tour and this was to herald a significant return to form for the band. A revitalised lineup consisting of Prior, Kemp, Knight, Genockey and newcomer Ken Nicol released the album They Called Her Babylon early in 2004, to considerable acclaim. The band extensively toured the UK, Europe and Australia.

For their 40th anniversary tour, in 2009, Pete Zorn joined the line-up on bass, as Rick Kemp was unwell. Kemp and Zorn both toured with the band for the winter tour that year, with Zorn playing guitar, and Kemp announced that he would retire at the end of the tour – a decision he later reversed, as usual.

Live at a Distance, a live double CD and DVD set, was released in April 2009 by Park Records, and their new studio album entitled Cogs, Wheels & Lovers was released on 26 October 2009. Several tracks from this album featured in the sets of the autumn tour.

Founding member Tim Hart died on 24 December 2009, at his home in La Gomera on the Canary Islands, at the age of 61, after being diagnosed with inoperable lung cancer.

In June 2010 Ken Nicol announced that he was leaving Steeleye and the band reassembled for a Spring 2011 tour, with Julian Littman joining the line-up as guitarist, replacing Nicol. Multi-instrumentalist Pete Zorn also continued to play with the band, making them a six-piece for the first time in many years.

Peter Knight left Steeleye Span at the end of 2013. He was replaced by Jessie May Smart. The band continued to tour regularly and recorded four new tracks for the 2014 'Deluxe' re-release of the Wintersmith album.

In the summer of 2015 they toured North America, with a reduced line up consisting of Prior, Littman, Smart, Genockey and, for the first time, Maddy's son, Alex Kemp, on bass, replacing his father, Rick. An autumn/winter tour of the UK followed with Rick Kemp back in the line-up, along with Andrew 'Spud' Sinclair, replacing Pete Zorn. In April 2016 Pete Zorn was diagnosed with advanced lung and brain cancer. He died on 19 April. Andrew Sinclair joined the band permanently in 2016 and the line up toured in October 2016 and announced the release of a new studio album, Dodgy Bastards, in November. The album is a mixture of original compositions, traditional songs and original tunes put to traditional lyrics.

After completing the 'Dodgy Bastards' tour, Rick Kemp retired and has been replaced by Roger Carey, on bass. For the November/December 2017 tour the band was joined by multi-instrumentalist and ex-Bellowhead member Benji Kirkpatrick. Benji is son of former Steeleye Span member, John Kirkpatrick. This seven-piece line-up was the first in the band's history. 2019 was the band's 50th anniversary year and a new album was released to celebrate the anniversary: Est'd 1969. The band undertook two "50th Anniversary" tours in 2019, in Spring and Winter. The band played the 'Avalon Stage' at the Glastonbury Festival 2019, were a closing act at the Cornbury Music Festival 2019 and even made their debut in Russia at a folk festival called Chasti Sveta (Части света, Parts of the World), in Saint Petersburg. On 17 December they appeared at the Barbican Theatre, in London, with special guests and previous band members Peter Knight, Martin Carthy and John Kirkpatrick.

For the November/December 2021 tour, the first post Covid tour, Benji Kirkpatrick was absent due to 'Personal Reasons' and with Jessie May Smart stil on maternity leave, Violeta Vicci joined the band, on violin. This same line up toured in May 2022. Benji Kirkpatrick left the band officially in February 2022 due to other commitments and has not been replaced. Former guitarist Bob Johnson died at the age of 79 on 15 December 2023.

== Members ==
=== Current ===
Image	Name	Years active	Instruments	Release contributions
	Maddy Prior	1969–1978; 1980–1997; 2002–present	vocals; percussion; banjo	all releases except Horkstow Grange (1998) and Bedlam Born (2000)
	Liam Genockey	1989–1997; 2002–present	drums; percussion	all releases from Tonight's the Night...Live (1992) to present, except Horkstow Grange (1998) and Bedlam Born (2000)
	Julian Littman	2010–present	guitars; mandolin; keyboards; vocals	all releases from Wintersmith (2013) to present
	Jessie May Smart	2014–present	violin; vocals	Wintersmith (2014) deluxe version; Dodgy Bastards (2016); Est'd 1969 (2019)
	Andrew "Spud" Sinclair	2015–present	guitars; vocals	Dodgy Bastards (2016); Est'd 1969 (2019)
	Roger Carey	2017–present	bass; vocals	Est'd 1969 (2019)
	Violeta Vicci	2019–present	violin	none to date
	Athena Octavia	2023–present	violin; vocals	none to date

=== Former ===
Image	Name	Years active	Instruments	Release contributions
	Tim Hart	1969–1978; 1980–1982 (died 2009)	guitars; dulcimer; mandolin; banjo; keyboards; vocals	all releases from Hark! The Village Wait (1970) to Sails of Silver (1980); The Journey (1999)
	Ashley Hutchings	1969–1972	bass; vocals	Hark! The Village Wait (1970); Please to See the King (1971); Ten Man Mop, or Mr. Reservoir Butler Rides Again (1971); The Journey (1999)
	Gay Woods	1969–1970; 1995–2001	vocals; bodhran; concertina; autoharp	Hark! The Village Wait (1970); Time (1996); Sails of Silver (1980) 1998 bonus tracks; Horkstow Grange (1998); Bedlam Born (2000); The Journey (1999)
	Terry Woods	1969–1970	guitars; concertina; mandolin; banjo; vocals	Hark! The Village Wait (1970)
	Dave Mattacks	1969–1970 (session); 1997–2001 (as unofficial member)	drums; percussion	Hark! The Village Wait (1970); Horkstow Grange (1998); Bedlam Born (2000)
	Peter Knight	1971–1977; 1980–2013; 2023	violin; keyboards; guitars; mandolin; banjo; vocals; bass; recorder	all releases from Please to See the King (1971) to Wintersmith (2013), except Storm Force Ten (1977), Live at Last (1978) and Live at De Montfort Hall Leicester, 1977 (2019)
	Martin Carthy	1971–1972; 1977–1978	guitars; keyboards; banjo; vocals	Please to See the King (1971); Ten Man Mop, or Mr. Reservoir Butler Rides Again (1971); Storm Force Ten (1977); Live at Last (1978); Live at De Montfort Hall Leicester, 1977 (2019); The Journey (1999)
	Bob Johnson	1972–1977; 1980–2000; 2002 (died 2023)	guitars; vocals	all releases from Below the Salt (1972) to Present – The Very Best of Steeleye Span (2002), except Storm Force Ten (1977), Live at Last (1978) and Live at De Montfort Hall Leicester, 1977 (2019)
	Rick Kemp	1972–1978; 1980–1986; 1995; 2000–2016	bass; drums; vocals; guitar	all releases from Below the Salt (1972) to Back in Line (1986), and from Present – The Very Best of Steeleye Span (2002) to Dodgy Bastards (2016); The Journey (1999)
	Nigel Pegrum	1973–1978; 1980–1989	drums; percussion; flute; recorder; oboe	all releases from Now We Are Six (1974) to Tempted and Tried (1989)
	John Kirkpatrick	1977–1978	accordion; vocals	Storm Force Ten (1977); Live at Last (1978); Live at De Montfort Hall Leicester, 1977 (2019)
	Mark Williamson	1986	bass	none
	Chris Staines	1986–1987	bass	none
	Tim Harries	1988–2002	bass; piano; keyboards; guitars; vocals	all releases from Tempted and Tried (1989) to Bedlam Born (2000)
	Michael Gregory	1995	drums; percussion	The Journey (1999)
	Terl Bryant	2001–2002	drums; percussion	none
	Ken Nicol	2002–2010	guitars; vocals	They Called Her Babylon (2004); Winter (2004); Bloody Men (2006); Cogs, Wheels and Lovers (2009)
	Pete Zorn	2009–2015 (died 2016)	guitars; woodwind; vocals	Wintersmith (2013)
	Benji Kirkpatrick	2017–2022 (inactive 2019–2022)	bouzouki; banjo; mandolin; guitar; vocals	Est'd 1969 (2019)

== Lineups ==
Period	Members	Releases
1969–1970	Tim Hart – guitars, vocals; Maddy Prior – vocals; Terry Woods – guitars, concertina, vocals; Gay Woods – concertina, vocals; Ashley Hutchings – bass, vocals; With: Dave Mattacks – drums; Gerry Conway – drums	Hark! The Village Wait (1970)
1970–1972	Tim Hart – guitars, vocals; Maddy Prior – vocals; Ashley Hutchings – bass, vocals; Martin Carthy – guitars, keyboards, vocals; Peter Knight – strings, keyboards, guitars, vocals	Please to See the King (1971); Ten Man Mop, or Mr. Reservoir Butler Rides Again (1971)
1972–1973	Tim Hart – guitars, vocals; Maddy Prior – vocals; Peter Knight – strings, keyboards, guitars, vocals; Bob Johnson – guitars, vocals; Rick Kemp – bass, drums, vocals	Below the Salt (1972); Parcel of Rogues (1973)
1973–1977	Tim Hart – guitars, vocals; Maddy Prior – vocals; Peter Knight – strings, keyboards, guitars, vocals; Bob Johnson – guitars, vocals; Rick Kemp – bass, vocals; Nigel Pegrum – drums, percussion, flute	Now We Are Six (1974); Commoners Crown (1975); All Around My Hat (1975); Rocket Cottage (1976)
1977–1978	Tim Hart – guitars, vocals; Maddy Prior – vocals; Rick Kemp – bass, vocals; Nigel Pegrum – drums, percussion, flute; Martin Carthy – guitars, keyboards, vocals; John Kirkpatrick – accordion, vocals	Storm Force Ten (1977); Live at Last (1978); Live at De Montfort Hall Leicester, 1977 (2019)
1978–1980 on hiatus
1980–1982	Tim Hart – guitars, vocals; Maddy Prior – vocals; Rick Kemp – bass, vocals; Nigel Pegrum – drums, percussion, flute; Peter Knight – strings, keyboards, guitars, vocals; Bob Johnson – guitars, vocals	Sails of Silver (1980); On Tour (1983)
1982–1986	Maddy Prior – vocals; Rick Kemp – bass, vocals; Nigel Pegrum – drums, percussion, flute; Peter Knight – strings, keyboards, guitars, vocals; Bob Johnson – guitars, vocals	Back in Line (1986); The Collection: Steeleye Span in Concert (1994)
1986	Maddy Prior – vocals; Nigel Pegrum – drums, percussion, flute; Peter Knight – strings, keyboards, guitars, vocals; Bob Johnson – guitars, vocals; Mark Williamson – bass	
1986–1987	Maddy Prior – vocals; Nigel Pegrum – drums, percussion, flute; Peter Knight – strings, keyboards, guitars, vocals; Bob Johnson – guitars, vocals; Chris Staines – bass	
1988–1989	Maddy Prior – vocals; Nigel Pegrum – drums, percussion, flute; Peter Knight – strings, keyboards, guitars, vocals; Bob Johnson – guitars, vocals; Tim Harries – bass, piano, vocals	Tempted and Tried (1989)
1989–1994	Maddy Prior – vocals; Peter Knight – strings, keyboards, guitars, vocals; Bob Johnson – guitars, vocals; Tim Harries – bass, piano, vocals; Liam Genockey – drums, percussion	Tonight's the Night...Live (1992); The Collection: Steeleye Span in Concert (1994); Live in Nottingham (2002)
1995 (Reunion concert)	Maddy Prior – vocals; Peter Knight – strings, keyboards, guitars, vocals; Bob Johnson – guitars, vocals; Tim Harries – bass, piano, vocals; Liam Genockey – drums, percussion; Gay Woods – vocals; Ashley Hutchings – bass, vocals; Martin Carthy – guitars, keyboards, vocals; Rick Kemp – bass, vocals; Nigel Pegrum – drums, percussion, flute; John Kirkpatrick – accordion, vocals; Michael Gregory – drums, percussion; Tim Hart – guitars, vocals	The Journey (1999)
1994–1997	Maddy Prior – vocals; Peter Knight – strings, keyboards, guitars, vocals; Bob Johnson – guitars, keyboards, vocals; Tim Harries – bass, piano, vocals; Liam Genockey – drums, percussion; Gay Woods – vocals, bodhran	Time (1996); Sails of Silver (1980) 1998 bonus tracks
1997–2000	Peter Knight – strings, keyboards, guitars, vocals; Bob Johnson – guitars, vocals; Gay Woods – vocals; Tim Harries – bass, piano, keyboards, vocals, guitars; With: Dave Mattacks – drums, percussion	Horkstow Grange (1998); Bedlam Born (2000)
2000–2001	Peter Knight – strings, keyboards, guitars, vocals; Tim Harries – guitars, piano, vocals; Gay Woods – vocals; Rick Kemp – bass, vocals; With: Dave Mattacks – drums, percussion	
2001–2002	Peter Knight – strings, keyboards, guitars, vocals; Tim Harries – guitars, piano, vocals; Rick Kemp – bass, vocals; Terl Bryant – drums, percussion	
2002	Peter Knight – strings, keyboards, guitars, vocals; Rick Kemp – bass, vocals; Maddy Prior – vocals; Bob Johnson – guitars, vocals; Liam Genockey – drums, percussion	Present – The Very Best of Steeleye Span (2002)
2002–2009	Peter Knight – strings, keyboards, guitars, vocals; Rick Kemp – bass, vocals; Maddy Prior – vocals; Liam Genockey – drums, percussion; Ken Nicol – guitars, vocals	They Called Her Babylon (2004); Winter (2004); Bloody Men (2006); Folk Rock Pioneers in Concert (2006); Cogs, Wheels and Lovers (2009); Live at a Distance (2009)
2009–2010	Peter Knight – strings, keyboards, guitars, vocals; Rick Kemp – bass, vocals; Maddy Prior – vocals; Liam Genockey – drums, percussion; Ken Nicol – guitars, vocals; Pete Zorn – guitars, woodwind, vocals	
2010–2013	Peter Knight – strings, keyboards, guitars, vocals; Rick Kemp – bass, vocals; Maddy Prior – vocals; Liam Genockey – drums, percussion; Pete Zorn – guitars, woodwind, vocals; Julian Littman – guitars, keyboards, vocals	Now We Are Six Again (2012); Wintersmith (2013)
2014–2015	Rick Kemp – bass, vocals; Maddy Prior – vocals; Liam Genockey – drums, percussion; Pete Zorn – guitars, woodwind, vocals; Julian Littman – guitars, keyboards; Jessie May Smart – violin, vocals	Wintersmith (2014) deluxe version
2015–2016	Rick Kemp – bass, vocals; Maddy Prior – vocals; Liam Genockey – drums, percussion; Julian Littman – guitars, keyboards, vocals; Jessie May Smart – violin, vocals; Spud Sinclair – guitars, vocals	Dodgy Bastards (2016)
2017–2019	Maddy Prior – vocals; Liam Genockey – drums, percussion; Julian Littman – guitars, keyboards, vocals; Jessie May Smart – violin, vocals; Spud Sinclair – guitars, vocals; Roger Carey – bass, vocals; Benji Kirkpatrick – guitar, mandolin, bouzouki, banjo, vocals	Est'd 1969 (2019); 50th Anniversary Tour (2019); Hark! The Village Wait – Live (2021)
2019–present	Maddy Prior – vocals; Liam Genockey – drums, percussion; Julian Littman – guitars, keyboards, vocals; Spud Sinclair – guitars, vocals; Roger Carey – bass, vocals; Shared violinist role: Jessie May Smart – violin, vocals; Violeta Vicci – violin (initially covering for Smart on maternity leave); Athena Octavia – violin, vocals	
