= English folk music (2000–2009) =

Music genre

== Births and deaths ==
=== Deaths ===
- Fred Jordan (5 January 1922 – 30 July 2002)
- Cyril Tawney (1930–2005)

== Recordings ==
- 2000: The Wood and the Wire (Fairport Convention)
- 2000: Dazzling Stranger (Bert Jansch)
- 2000: Bedlam Born (Steeleye Span)
- 2001: Going and Staying (Brass Monkey)
- 2002: Anglicana (Eliza Carthy)
- 2002: XXXV (Fairport Convention)
- 2002: Present--The Very Best of Steeleye Span (Steeleye Span)
- 2003: Rhythm Of The Times (Fairport Convention)
- 2003: An echo of hooves (June Tabor)
- 2004: Flame of Fire (Brass Monkey)
- 2004: Waiting For Angels (Martin Carthy)
- 2004: Over the Next Hill (Fairport Convention)
- 2004: The Quiet Joys of Brotherhood (Fairport Convention)
- 2004: They Called Her Babylon (Steeleye Span)
- 2004: Winter (Steeleye Span)
- 2005: Journeyman's Grace (Fairport Convention)
- 2005: At The Wood's Heart (June Tabor)
- 2006: Off The Desk (Fairport Convention)
- 2006: Bloody Men (Steeleye Span)
- 2006: Holy Heathens and the Old Green Man (Waterson–Carthy)
- 2007: Sense of Occasion (Fairport Convention)
- 2007: Live at the BBC (Fairport Convention)
- 2007: The Bairns (Rachel Unthank and the Winterset)
- 2009: Poetry of the Deed (Frank Turner)

== See also ==
- Music of the United Kingdom (1990s-present)
