= Bedlam Born =

2000 album by Steeleye Span

Studio album by Steeleye Span
- Released: 24 October 2000
- Recorded: Warehouse Studios, Oxford
- Genre: British folk rock
- Length: 51:31
- Label: Park Records
- Producer: Steeleye Span

Steeleye Span chronology
Horkstow Grange (1998)	Bedlam Born (2000)	Present – The Very Best of Steeleye Span (2002)

Bedlam Born is the 16th studio album by British folk rock band Steeleye Span. It is the second of two albums made by a line-up consisting of Gay Woods, Bob Johnson, Peter Knight and Tim Harries, and only the second album on which Maddy Prior did not make an appearance. The title refers not to a bedlam, but to Christ's birth in Bethlehem (which is occasionally corrupted to 'Bedlam'). "There is a child in Bedlam born" is a line from "Stephen".

== Tracks and reception ==
Their previous album, Horkstow Grange was not well received by fans, many of whom complained that the album was too light on rock and too heavy on folk. For Bedlam Born the band emphasized the rock elements, producing tracks such as "Well Done Liar", "John of Ditchford", and "We Poor Laboring Men" that have a strong rock guitar line, driving bass, and comparatively heavy drumming, provided by the band's regular guest drummer Dave Mattacks. While Woods was the primary lead singer on Horkstow Grange, on this album she sings lead on only five songs, mostly quieter pieces that allowed her to demonstrate her high range. Two of these pieces, "Arbour" and "The White Cliffs of Dover" experiment with spoken-word sequences, something entirely new for the band. ("John of Ditchford", incidentally, is a fairly accurate retelling of an actual murder case that occurred in England in the early 14th century.)

According to Woods, two tracks, "I See His Blood Upon the Rose" and "Stephen", attracted considerable complaint from fans. Both pieces are explicitly Christian, with "Stephen" being about a stable boy in Bethlehem at the time of the Massacre of the Innocents. Fans objected that the band had always stuck to secular music and felt uncomfortable about the religious sentiments of these two tracks. This complaint is to some extent unjustified since, although the majority of the band's repertoire is secular, the band has in fact performed a number of explicitly Christian pieces over the course of its history. Its second-highest charting song, "Gaudete" is a Latin chant celebrating Christ's birth. "Harvest Home", off Sails of Silver is a 19th-century Anglican hymn. Although Steeleye Span didn't get around to recording "Lyke-Wake Dirge" until 2002, this medieval song about purgatory was the introduction of their first American tour, while "Lanercost" from Back in Line uses the Kyrie Eleison as its chorus. In 2004, the band would release Winter, an album of Christmas songs, about half of which were traditional Christian pieces.

Professional ratings
Review scores
Source	Rating
Allmusic	link

Like the previous album, reactions to Bedlam were mixed. Many complained that the album was too rock-heavy, while others lamented Prior's continued absence. On the other hand, some celebrated the album as a return to the sound the band had during the mid-1970s.

== Aftermath ==
The recording of this album was reportedly tumultuous, with Woods eventually quitting the band again, reportedly over money issues, and Harries also departing after the release of the album. Johnson, who had been the band's main guitarist for most of the band's history, chose to retire because of health trouble. This left a need for a lead guitarist for the band's tour, and Rick Kemp, who had been a member in the band's commercially successful middle period, returned and eventually rejoined the band on a full-time basis. During the tour, Kemp and Harries alternated playing lead guitar and bass.

== Track listing ==
1. "Well Done Liar!" (Traditional; arranged by Bob Johnson) – 4.35
2. "Who Told the Butcher?" (Peter Knight) – 2.58
3. "John of Ditchford" (Tim Harries) – 3.43
4. "I See His Blood Upon the Rose" (Joseph Plunkett, Gay Woods, Harries) – 4.58
5. "Black Swan" (Harries) – 1.50
6. "The Beggar" (Traditional; arranged by Bob Johnson) – 3.00
7. "Poor old Soldier" (Knight) – 2.20
8. "Arbour" (Harries, Woods) – 1.26
9. "There was a Wealthy Merchant" (Traditional; arranged by Harries) – 4.58
10. "Beyond the Dreaming Place" (Knight, Woods) – 3.04
11. "We Poor Labouring Men" (Traditional; arranged by Steeleye Span) – 5.05
12. "The Connemara Cradle Song" (Traditional, Delia Murphy) – 5.38
13. "Stephen" (Harries) – 4.25
14. "The White Cliffs of Dover" (Burton, Kent; arranged by Woods) – 3.06

== Personnel ==
Steeleye Span

- Gay Woods - vocals, bodhrán
- Bob Johnson - vocals, electric guitar, acoustic guitar
- Peter Knight - vocals, keyboards, violin
- Tim Harries - bass guitar, electric guitar, keyboards, vocals

Unofficial member

- Dave Mattacks - drums, percussion
