= Sails of Silver =

Studio album by Steeleye Span
- Released: 1980 (US: 1981)
- Studios: Sawmills Studios, Golant, Cornwall
- Genre: British folk rock
- Length: 37:30
- Label: Chrysalis
- Producer: Gus Dudgeon

Steeleye Span chronology
Live at Last (1978)	Sails of Silver (1980)	Back in Line (1986)

Professional ratings
Review scores
Source	Rating
Allmusic	3/5 stars

Sails of Silver is the eleventh studio album by British folk rock band Steeleye Span. It was released in 1980 by Chrysalis Records. The album was produced two years after the band's ostensible break-up. At the request of Chrysalis Records Peter Knight and Bob Johnson both returned, replacing their own replacements Martin Carthy and John Kirkpatrick, who departed after the release of Live at Last. Despite being produced by Elton John's producer Gus Dudgeon, Sails of Silver was a commercial failure, and this proved a final straw for Tim Hart, who departed the band, leaving Maddy Prior as the band's sole remaining founding member.

Although the band now sported the same line-up that had brought it to the height of its success, Sails of Silver has often been seen as embodying a different spirit from their classic albums of the 1970s. Prior to Sails of Silver, the band had always performed songs written by other people, predominantly traditional songs, but also a few 20th century pieces, such as the two Brecht songs on Storm Force Ten. But on this album they included several songs they had written themselves, including "Let Her Go Down" and "Senior Service". This was the beginning of a trend that continues down to the present. Every album they have released since Sails has had at least one song written by band members, and Back in Line and Bloody Men were predominantly the band's material.

Maddy Prior has said that, although she likes the album and finds it accessible, the band was in her words "lost" and not particularly confident of the material it had put together. Fans found the album jarring, although they were pleased that the band was touring again, and the band's shows always included their earlier material.

== Track listing ==
No.	Title	Writer(s)	Lead vocals	Length
1.	"Sails of Silver"	Tim Hart	Maddy Prior	3:27
2.	"My Love"	Hart	Hart, Prior	2:54
3.	"Barnet Fair"	Rick Kemp	Prior	4:34
4.	"Senior Service"	Prior, Kemp	Prior	3:30
5.	"Gone to America"	Peter Knight	Prior	4:20
6.	"Where Are They Now?"	Kemp	Prior	4:10
7.	"Let Her Go Down"	Knight	Knight	3:36
8.	"Longbone"	Bob Johnson	Johnson	3:57
9.	"Marigold/Harvest Home"	Knight, Prior	Prior	3:05
10.	"Tell Me Why"	Trad. arr. Prior, Hart, Johnson, Kemp, Knight, Pegrum	Prior	3:54

=== Reissue ===
When the album was reissued in 1998, three bonus tracks were included:

1. "Thomas the Rhymer" (Live 1997)
2. "My Johnny was a Shoemaker" (Live 1996)
3. "The Lark in the Morning" (Live 1996)

== Personnel ==
Steeleye Span

- Maddy Prior - vocals
- Tim Hart - vocals, guitar
- Bob Johnson - vocals, guitar
- Rick Kemp - vocals, bass guitar
- Peter Knight - vocals, violin, keyboards
- Nigel Pegrum - drums, percussion, woodwind

The final two tracks were recorded when Steeleye Span were supporting Status Quo on tour. The line-up for the final three tracks is as follows:

- Maddy Prior - vocals
- Gay Woods - vocals
- Peter Knight - vocals, violin
- Bob Johnson - vocals, guitar, keyboards
- Tim Harries - vocals, bass guitar
- Liam Genockey - drums, percussion
