= Horkstow Grange =

1998 studio album by Steeleye Span

Studio album by Steeleye Span
- Released: 1998
- Recorded: 1998
- Genre: British folk rock
- Label: Park Records
- Producer: Steeleye Span

Steeleye Span chronology
Time (1996)	Horkstow Grange (1998)	Bedlam Born (2000)

Professional ratings
Review scores
Source	Rating
Allmusic	link

Horkstow Grange is an album by British folk rock band Steeleye Span. Released in 1998, it is the band's 15th album, and the first album the band recorded without founding member Maddy Prior. The album has a very strong folk flavour, with rather less rock elements than on previous albums.

Gay Woods provides most of the lead vocals, although the other three members of the band all do the lead singing on at least one song each. Liam Genockey, who had played drums on the band's previous two albums also departed, so most of the songs employ minimal or no percussion, although Woods plays tambourine or bodhran on several songs, and former Fairport Convention drummer Dave Mattacks plays a drum kit on three songs.

The album has much in common with Ten Man Mop, or Mr. Reservoir Butler Rides Again. The tunes tend to be simpler and the performances more subdued, and in some ways the album is a return to the sound the band had on its first three albums. The album also has a strong Irish influence, with songs such as "The Old Turf Fire", "Erin", "The Bonny Irish Boy", and "The Parting Glass" all being of Irish origin. Woods' vocal style is distinctly different from Prior's, being more earthy and often more 'in character'. Unusually, the album has no instrumental pieces. Peter Knight summed up the album with the comment that "Horkstow Grange was very much the sound of four musicians marking their territory and coming out with something different to what's gone before."

Perhaps because of the many differences between this album and Steeleye's core sound, this album was not well received, with many fans suggesting that it was somehow not Steeleye Span without Maddy Prior. Much of the criticism from fans focused on Woods, perhaps because her singing is so prominent on the album and because she had become the band's frontwoman.

The album's highlight is probably "The Parting Glass". Its minimal instrumentation allows Woods to demonstrate the strength of her voice. Other highlights include "The Old Turf Fire" and "I Wish That I Never Was Married", both also sung by Woods. "One True Love" is also the first Steeleye Span song to feature Tim Harries on lead vocals.

The album's title refers to a traditional English song, first collected by Percy Grainger, one of the early proponents of collecting traditional music. The song is about a quarrel between John Steeleye Span and one of his servants. The song was the inspiration for the band's name, but they only got around to recording the song 28 years after first forming.

The track "Australia" is dedicated to Nigel Pegrum, the band's former drummer, who moved to Australia.

== Track listing ==
All tracks are Traditional; except where noted.

1. "The Old Turf Fire" (Johnny Patterson)
2. "The Tricks of London"
3. "Horkstow Grange"
4. "Lord Randall"
5. "Erin"
6. "Queen Mary/Hunsden House"
7. "Bonny Birdy"
8. "Bonny Irish Boy"
9. "I Wish That I Never Was Wed"
10. "Australia"
11. "One True Love"
12. "The Parting Glass"

== Personnel ==
Steeleye Span

- Gay Woods - vocals, bodhran, tambourine
- Bob Johnson - vocals, electric guitar, acoustic guitar, flamenco guitar
- Peter Knight - vocals, violin, electric violin, piano, viola, percussion
- Tim Harries - vocals, bass, keyboards, piano

Unofficial member

- Dave Mattacks - drums
