= Nicol & Marsh =

English soft rock duo

- Origin: England
- Genres: Soft rock
- Years active: 1974–1978
- Labels: Epic, Polydor
- Past members: Ken Nicol; Peter Marsh

Nicol & Marsh were an English soft rock duo which consisted of Ken Nicol and Peter Marsh.

== Career ==
Nicol & Marsh released two albums and several singles. Their debut album was 1974's Nicol and Marsh's Easy Street. After the duo joined forces with Richard James Burgess, the trio became known as Easy Street. As the trio Easy Street, they released two albums, Easy Street in 1976 and Under the Glass in 1977.

After Easy Street's 1977 album Under the Glass, Nicol & Marsh released one last album in 1978, the eponymous Nicol & Marsh, to which their partnership dissolved; an interview with Nicol implied that Marsh was moving in a different direction, saying: "...what happened is what happens to a lot of people, and you start to try other things, writing with other people and we were making too much of a departure from what was working originally. So then the album would seem too diverse; one track would appear very different to another because, say, Pete would have written it with the drummer."

Both Nicol and Marsh went on to have successful solo careers as singer-songwriters, guitarists and producers, releasing solo material as well as becoming members of other bands and working with other artists. Among the bands Nicol was a member of are the Ashley Hutchings Dance Band, the Albion Band and Steeleye Span. Marsh was a member of the new wave bands Twist and Blanket of Secrecy.

== Discography ==
=== Albums ===
- Nicol & Marsh's Easy Street (1974), Epic
- Nicol & Marsh (1978), Polydor

=== Singles ===
- "I've Been Praying" (1974), Epic
- "Midnight Cat" (1974), Epic
- "Sinking Down" (1974), Epic
- "Hurt by Love" (1978), Polydor
- "Streets of the Angels" (1978), Polydor
