= Bloody Men =

Studio album by Steeleye Span
- Released: 2006
- Recorded: 2006
- Genre: British folk rock
- Length: 62:52
- Label: Park Records

Steeleye Span chronology
Winter (2004)	Bloody Men (2006)	Cogs, Wheels & Lovers (2009)

Professional ratings
Review scores
Source	Rating
Allmusic	4/5 stars

Bloody Men is the 20th studio album by British folk rock band Steeleye Span.

This album represents a continuation of the band's recent surge of activity. In 2002, the band was in a state of near collapse, since three members of its line-up at the time, Tim Harries, Gay Woods, and Bob Johnson, had all departed, leaving long-time member Peter Knight and recently returned member Rick Kemp as the only remaining members. That same year, Knight persuaded former members Maddy Prior and Liam Genockey to return and coaxed Johnson out of retirement to record the album Present--The Very Best of Steeleye Span. Ken Nicol came on board to replace Johnson, and the band has been relatively active since then, releasing two albums, They Called Her Babylon and Winter, in 2004, and Bloody Men late in 2006, as well as touring extensively.

During its heyday in the 1970s, Steeleye almost exclusively recorded their arrangements of traditional songs, with occasional forays into versions of 20th century songs by other artists such as Buddy Holly and Bertolt Brecht. But starting in the early 1980s, the band's albums have increasingly focused on a mixture of traditional songs and their own compositions, and 'Bloody Men' continues that trend, albeit with a new twist. The album consists of 2 CDs, the first a mixture of traditional and original pieces. The second CD is the 5-song "Ned Ludd" cycle, written mostly by Kemp, about the 19th century Luddite movement. The band has never attempted a multi-song cycle like this before.

The album opens with the bawdy "Bonny Black Hare", on which Prior sings in a gravelly voice and Knight plays his violin rather like an electric guitar, a successful experiment that goes unrepeated on the album. Other highlights include a hard-rock cover of "Cold Haily Windy Night", which the band first offered on Please to See the King, the brisk "The 3 Sisters" and the cheerful "Lord Elgin". The notes for "Lord Elgin" say that "this song is not what it seems on the face of it," indicating that it is a riddle-song. A probable solution is at the bottom of the page. The song "Whummil Bore" is about a servant looking through a whummil bore (a hole bored with a gimlet-like tool) and watching a lady getting dressed. The instrumental "First House in Connaught" is a cover of a track from Tempted and Tried, the first time the band has ever covered one of its own instrumental pieces.

The Ned Ludd cycle begins with a song about the enclosure movement in Early Modern England, effectively a pastoral ode to pre-industrial England, and then moves on to the plight of the workers who have been displaced by industrialization. The third song is an appeal to the mythical Ned Ludd to destroy the machines and lead the workers in a rebellion. The fourth and fifth songs deal with the Peterloo Massacre of 1819, in which the British cavalry charged into a peaceful crowd of protesters supporting a repeal of the Corn Laws. Neither the Enclosure Movement nor the Corn Laws were directly related to the Luddite Movement, but in the cycle these serve to explore the wider problems of common workers.

== Personnel ==
Steeleye Span

- Maddy Prior - vocals
- Peter Knight - violin, vocals
- Rick Kemp - bass, vocals
- Ken Nicol - guitar, vocals
- Liam Genockey - drums, percussion

== Track listing ==
Disc 1

1. "Bonny Black Hare" - 4:40
2. "The Story of the Scullion King" - 4:43
3. "The Dreamer & the Widow" - 4:49
4. "Lord Elgin" - 4:06
5. "The 3 Sisters" - 4:16
6. "The 1st House in Connaught" - 3:39
7. "Cold Haily Windy Night" - 4:40
8. "Whummil Bore" (Child ballad 27) - 4:13
9. "Demon of the Well" - 5:58
10. "Lord Gregory" (Child ballad 76) - 5:41

Disc 2

1. "Ned Ludd Part 1 (Inclosure)" - 2:48
2. "Ned Ludd Part 2 (Rural Retreat)" - 4:11
3. "Ned Ludd Part 3 (Ned Ludd)" - 3:20
4. "Ned Ludd Part 4 (Prelude to Peterloo)" - 2:56
5. "Ned Ludd Part 5 (Peterloo the Day)" - 2:52
