= Child Owlet =

Traditional song

"Child Owlet" (Roud 3883, Child 291) is a traditional murder ballad. It was performed by English folk rock band Steeleye Span on their 2004 album They Called Her Babylon and by Kathryn Roberts and Sean Lakeman on their 2015 album Tomorrow Will Follow Today.

== Synopsis ==
Lady Erskine tries to seduce her husband's nephew, Child Owlet, but he refuses. She stabs herself and tells her husband that he had tried to seduce her. He puts Child Owlet to death by having him torn apart by wild horses.

== See also ==
- List of the Child Ballads
