= Tonight's the Night =

Tonight's the Night or other variations may refer to:

== Films ==
- Tonight's the Night (1932 film), a 1932 British film starring Leslie Fuller
- Tonight's the Night, American title of the 1954 film Happy Ever After, a British comedy starring David Niven
- Tonight's the Night, a 1987 TV movie directed by Bobby Roth

== Musicals ==
- To-Night's the Night (musical), a 1914 musical comedy
- Tonight's the Night (2003 musical), written by Ben Elton, featuring the music of Rod Stewart

== Albums ==
- Tonight's the Night (The Shirelles album), 1961
- Tonight's the Night (Neil Young album), 1975
- Tonight's the Night...Live, Steeleye Span album, 1992

== Songs ==
- "Tonight's the Night", a song from Rock 'n' Roll Stage Show (1956) by Bill Haley & His Comets
- "Tonight's the Night" (The Shirelles song), 1960
- "Tonight Is the Night", a song recorded by Betty Wright in 1974
- "Tonight's the Night" (Neil Young song), 1975, title song from Tonight's the Night
- "Tonight's the Night (Gonna Be Alright)", a 1976 song by Rod Stewart, covered by Janet Jackson
- "To-night's the Night", a 1977 song by Brotherhood of Man from the album Images
- "Tonight's The Night (Good Time)", a 1979 single by Kleeer, from the album I Love to Dance
- "Tonight's the Night", a 1980 song by Raydio, from the album Two Places at the Same Time
- "Tonight's the Night", a song by Steeleye Span from Tonight's the Night...Live, released in 1992
- "Tonight's da Night", a single by Redman released in 1993
- "Tonight's the Night" (Blackstreet song), 1995
- "Tonight is the Night", a 1995 song by Le Click
- "Tonight's the Night! (You Are Miss USA)", an opening number at Miss USA 1995 pageant
- "Tonite's tha Night", a 1995 song by Kris Kross from their third album
- "Tonight's the Night", a 2003 song by Pink from her album Try This
- "Tonight's the Night" (Little Birdy song), 2004
- "Tonight's the Night", a 2006 song by Gina G
- "Tonight Is the Night" (Outasight song), recorded by Outasight in 2011
- "Tonight's the Night" (Romeo song), 2012
- "Tonight is the Night" (McFly song), 2020

== Television ==
- Tonight's the Night (TV series), a 2009 BBC series
- "Tonight's the Night" (Gotham), an episode of Gotham
- "Tonight's the Night", an episode of Grounded for Life
- "Tonight's the Night", an episode of Popular
