= Easy Street (band) =

English soft rock band

- Origin: England
- Genres: Soft rock
- Years active: 1974–1978
- Labels: Polydor, Capricorn
- Past members: Ken Nicol; Peter Marsh; Richard James Burgess

Easy Street were an English soft rock band which consisted of Ken Nicol, Peter Marsh and Richard James Burgess.

== History ==
Marsh had a long-standing musical partnership with his then brother-in-law, Ken Nicol, during the 1970s. They first signed to CBS in 1973, and were known as the duo Nicol & Marsh. In 1975, after the addition of Richard James Burgess, they became known as Easy Street, named after the duo's 1974 album Nicol & Marsh's Easy Street. As the trio Easy Street, they released two albums, the eponymous Easy Street in 1976 and Under the Glass in 1977.

The single "I've Been Lovin' You" reached No. 81 on the U.S. Billboard Hot 100 during the first week of August 1976.

Easy Street toured in Europe and the US and were the 1976 runners-up of the UK TV show New Faces. The collaboration between Marsh and Nicol ended after the release of the duo's final album, 1978's Nicol & Marsh. An interview with Nicol implied that Marsh was moving in a different direction, specifically appearing to refer to a growing collaboration between Marsh and Burgess.

== After Easy Street ==
Ken Nicol settled in the U.S. in 1979 and performed as a solo artist, and later as lead singer and co-writer for the band Versailles. He returned to England in 1988 and continued as a solo performer. He later joined the bands the Ashley Hutchings Dance Band, the Albion Band and Steeleye Span. Nicol has released a number of solo albums since 1988, with his latest album, Things in 2015.

Peter Marsh has worked as a singer, songwriter and record producer. He was a member of the new wave bands Twist and Blanket of Secrecy, and has worked with such artists as Vangelis, Manfred Mann's Earth Band, Godley & Creme, Nick Lowe and Carlene Carter. Marsh released the solo albums Stop the Clock (2013) and Back to the Beginning (2017).

Richard James Burgess has been a singer, songwriter, drummer, engineer and producer since the mid-1970s, most notably as a member of the band Landscape. He produced new wave band Spandau Ballet's first two albums and first seven singles. He has worked with many other artists during his 50-year music career. As well as a musician, Burgess is also an author, manager and marketer.

== Discography ==
=== Albums ===
- Easy Street (1976) Polydor/Capricorn
- Under the Glass (1977), Polydor/Capricorn

=== Compilation albums ===
- Easy Street/Under the Glass (reissue) (2009), Renaissance Records

=== Singles ===
- "I've Been Lovin' You" (1976) - U.S. #81
- "Feels Like Heaven" (1976)
- "Shadows on the Wall" (1976)
- "Flying" (1977)
- "Love at Breakfast" (1977)
