= Dodgy Bastards =

Studio album by Steeleye Span
- Released: 2016
- Recorded: 2016
- Genre: British folk rock
- Length: 71:54
- Label: Park Records

Steeleye Span chronology
| Wintersmith (2013) | Dodgy Bastards (2016) | Est'd 1969 (2019) |

Dodgy Bastards is the twenty-third studio album by British folk rock band Steeleye Span. It was released in November 2016, and features several arrangements of the Child Ballads.

This was the first Steeleye Span album released following the departure of fiddle player Peter Knight, and the final album to feature bassist Rick Kemp.

== Personnel ==
Steeleye Span

- Maddy Prior – vocals
- Jessie May Smart – violin, vocals
- Rick Kemp – bass, vocals
- Julian Littman – guitars, mandolin, keyboards, vocals
- Spud Sinclair – guitars, vocals
- Liam Genockey – drums, percussion

== Track listing ==
| No. | Title | Length |
|---|---|---|
| 1. | "Cruel Brother" | 7:51 |
| 2. | "All Things Are Quite Silent" | 4:16 |
| 3. | "Johnnie Armstrong" | 7:10 |
| 4. | "Boys Of Bedlam" | 5:22 |
| 5. | "Brown Robyn's Confession" | 5:46 |
| 6. | "Two Sisters" | 5:52 |
| 7. | "Cromwell's Skull" | 8:31 |
| 8. | "Dodgy Bastards" | 3:03 |
| 9. | "Gulliver Gentle And Rosemary" | 4:44 |
| 10. | "The Gardener" | 5:07 |
| 11. | "Bad Bones" | 4:11 |
| 12. | "The Lofty Tall Ship / Shallow Brown" | 10:01 |
| Total length: | | 71:54 |
