= Tempted and Tried =

Studio album by Steeleye Span
- Released: 18 September 1989
- Genre: British folk rock
- Length: 43:21
- Label: (United Kingdom) Chrysalis (United States) Shanachie
- Producer: John Etchells, Bob Johnson, Peter Knight

Steeleye Span chronology
Back in Line (1986)	Tempted and Tried (1989)	Tonight's the Night...Live (1992)

Professional ratings
Review scores
Source	Rating
Allmusic	4/5 stars

Tempted and Tried is the 13th studio album by British folk rock band Steeleye Span. The album was recorded after a three-year hiatus after the release of Back in Line. After releasing ten albums in fairly rapid succession during the 1970s, the band entered something of a creative dry spell, with 'Tempted' being only their 3rd album in 10 years. The album cover proclaims the album a "20th Anniversary Celebration", and the band was clearly eager to commemorate their anniversary, since strictly speaking the band had only been rehearsing in 1969, and didn't record until 1970.

Long-time bassist Rick Kemp had left the band a few years earlier, due to a repetitive-motion shoulder injury that left him unable to play bass without pain. On tours, the band had rotated a variety of bassists in to replace him, but it was decided that in advance of the new album and a tour that the band needed a permanent bassist. Nigel Pegrum turned to a friend of his, Tim Harries, a self-taught bassist and classically trained pianist, who agreed to join.

Harries brought the band some much-needed young blood, and Tempted and Tried proved a return to the band's 70s approach. Their previous two albums had relied heavily on songs written by the band and relatively little on traditional songs. But Tempted and Tried features mostly traditional songs arranged by the band, with only three new songs, all written by Peter Knight, and one of these, "Seagull", about the old game of Shove-penny, has a strong traditional feel to it. The only piece that feels strongly non-traditional is "Following Me", a song about a woman being stalked by a stranger who terrifies her. Highlights of the album include the vigorous "Jack Hall", the traditional ballad "The Two Butchers" and "The Fox", a short piece celebrating the cunning of a fox being hunted. In general, the album has a bright, confident feel to it, particularly "Padstow", which features a marvelous five-part harmony bridge.

The album's title presumably refers to the fact that the band has become well-seasoned by 20 years of performing; it seems to be a line from the hymn "Farther Along". The cover features the head of a fox, in reference to the song. The album is dedicated to all those who supported the band over the previous 20 years.

Shortly after the album was released, Pegrum chose to emigrate to Australia for relationship reasons, and the band brought in Liam Genockey to replace him as the drummer. Consequently, although Genocky does not appear on the album, he was the drummer for the band's 20th Anniversary Tour and appeared on the video of the tour.

The album was well-received, particularly in comparison to its two predecessors, although few consider it up to the high standards of the band's heyday. However, perhaps because of the infusion of new blood and perhaps because of the excitement of the anniversary, the album marks the beginning of a slow resurgence for the band. Over the next several years, the band members recommitted themselves to playing together and began exploring traditional material in new ways. Their real revival would still be a few years off, however. "Following Me/ The Two Butchers" was released as a single on "Dover Records". However, it had a serial number "FLUT 4" which showed that it had originally been on the Flutterby label.

== Track listing ==
US Track listing (Shanachie):

1. "Jack Hall" (Bob Johnson, Traditional) – 3:57
2. "Two Butchers" (Johnson, Traditional) – 4:49
3. "Padstow" (Traditional) – 3:03
4. "Reels: The First House in Connaught/Sailor's Bonnet" – 2:48
5. "Betsy Bell and Mary Gray" (Child 201) – 4:59
6. "Shaking of the Sheets" (Johnson, Traditional) – 4:11
7. "Searching for Lambs" – 4:12
8. "Seagull" (Peter Knight) – 4:32
9. "The Cruel Mother" – 5:36
10. "Following Me" (Knight) – 3:38
11. "The Fox" (Knight) – 3:02

UK track listing (Chrysalis):

1. "Padstow" (Traditional) – 3:03
2. "The Fox" (Knight) – 3:02
3. "Two Butchers" (Johnson, Traditional) – 4:49
4. "Following Me" (Knight) – 3:38
5. "Seagull" (Peter Knight) – 4:32
6. "The Cruel Mother" – 5:36
7. "Jack Hall" (Bob Johnson, Traditional) – 3:57
8. "Searching for Lambs" – 4:12
9. "Shaking of the Sheets" (Johnson, Traditional) – 4:11
10. "Reels: The First House in Connaught/Sailor's Bonnet" – 2:48
11. "Betsy Bell and Mary Gray" (Child 201) – 4:59

== Personnel ==
Steeleye Span

- Maddy Prior - vocals
- Bob Johnson - vocals, guitar
- Tim Harries - vocals, bass guitar, piano
- Peter Knight - vocals, violin, mandolin
- Nigel Pegrum - drums, percussion

Guest musician

- Martin Ditcham - percussion
