= Back in Line =

1986 album by Steeleye Span

Studio album by Steeleye Span
- Released: 1986
- Recorded: 1986
- Genre: British folk rock
- Length: 44:00
- Label: Shanachie
- Producer: John Acock

Steeleye Span chronology
Sails of Silver (1980)	Back in Line (1986)	Tempted and Tried (1989)

Professional ratings
Review scores
Source	Rating
Allmusic	2.5/5 stars

Back in Line is the twelfth studio album by British folk rock band Steeleye Span. The album was released in 1986, after a hiatus of almost 6 years. It is their first album without founding member Tim Hart, who quit the music business entirely. It is also the last album they recorded with Maddy Prior's husband, Rick Kemp, until They Called Her Babylon; Kemp suffered a shoulder injury that forced him to stop playing for a long time.

Like the previous album, Sails of Silver, this album was not well received by fans, and reviews tend to see the album as being slickly packaged but erratic in quality. Jon Herman of the Boston Phoenix wrote that both the album and the band's 20 June 1987 performance at the Berklee Performance Center "confirmed their status as a has-been quintet still stabbing at artiness."

A single was released from this album - "Somewhere in London/ Lanercost". This suggests that "Somewhere in London" was recorded on the same sessions as the album. When Park Records re-released the album in 1991, this lost track appeared at the end, together with two live tracks - "Spotted Cow" (the first track on '’Below the Salt'’) and "One Misty Moisty Morning" (the first track on Parcel of Rogues).

The album's highlights include the energetic funk version of "Blackleg Miner", a similarly funky "White Man", which features as complicated a vocal arrangement as Steeleye has ever offered, and "Isabel", a strong piece sung by Prior, about the Countess of Buchan who helped crown Robert the Bruce. In general, the pieces have a strong rock feel.

== Song Highlights ==
Like Sails of Silver, Back in Line contains many songs written by the band. All of the songs on the album are placed in an historical context. "Isabel", "Lanercost" and "Take My Heart" all deal with the Scottish Wars of Independence and Robert the Bruce. "White Man" is a critique of European colonialism, and "Peace on the Border" concern the 18th century rebellions and deportations. "Scarecrow" was about the Battle of Cropredy Bridge, a Royalist victory during the English Civil War.

=== Isabel ===
The band claims "Isabel" is about Isabella MacDuff, Countess of Buchan, whom they allege was a paramour of Robert the Bruce. She did crown him King of Scotland in 1306. After he was defeated at the Battle of Methven in June 1306, she was captured by the English and imprisoned in an outdoor cage at Berwick-upon-Tweed for four years. The song is a fictionalized first person perspective of her time on public display.

=== Lady Diamond ===
"Lady Diamond" is a version of a Child ballad 269, a version of which also appeared on The Tannahill Weavers' album Passage (1984). Nigel Pegrum and Rick Kemp helped produce several of the Tannahill's albums.

=== A Canon by Telemann ===
This selection enables Peter Knight to show off his classical training by performing both violin parts. A canon is essentially a melody played by two or more instruments in a follow-the-leader or looping technique.

=== Blackleg Miner ===
"Blackleg Miner" is a Northumbrian song from the 1844 miners' strike, which the band first recorded for Hark! The Village Wait (1970). This version is re-orchestrated with a much funkier feel than their first recording, and also puts greater stress on the line that threatens death against blacklegs. Their 1970 version had become an anthem for the striking miners during the strike of 1984-5, but it has also been controversial for inciting violence against strikebreakers. It was recorded directly to audio cassette at the Theatre Royal, Nottingham, in November 1985, with the strike having ended in March of that year.

=== Lanercost ===
Lanercost refers to a north Cumbrian village and priory of the same name from which King Edward I attempted to subdue the Scotts. Each of the four verses begins by describing the actions of the canons (priests) at the priory - fishing; praying; working in the scriptorium and finally carrying the King's coffin. The rest of each verse then discusses Edward and his actions - lying in bed "cursing fate" (as he is too ill to fight); delighting at his capture and execution of the Bruce's brothers; leaving to ride north and then dying before his work can be finished. The chorus is centered around a repetition of the Kyrie eleison, presumably suggesting that this would have been sung by the canons themselves.

=== Take My Heart ===
The band asserts, "Before Robert the Bruce died, he asked his close friend and comrade Sir James Douglas to take his heart to be buried next to the Sepulchre in the Holy Land."

== Track listing ==
No.	Title	Writer(s)	Personnel notes	Length
1.	"Edward"	Bob Johnson	* Bob Johnson lead vocal: Vince Cross DX7	6:20
2.	"Isabel"		* Maddy Prior lead vocal: Peter Knight piano	5:22
3.	"Lady Diamond"	Bob Johnson	* Bob Johnson lead vocal on verses: Maddy Prior lead vocal on chorus	4:41
4.	"Cannon by Telemann"	Georg Philipp Telemann	* Instrumental: Peter Knight all instruments (violins)	1:44
5.	"Peace on the Border"	Rick Kemp	* Rick Kemp lead vocals, bass, guitar: Vince Cross DX7	4:23
6.	"Blackleg Miner"	Traditional	* Maddy Prior lead vocals	4:06
7.	"White Man"	Peter Knight	* Peter Knight lead vocals, percussion, violin, bass guitar, piano	4:39
8.	"Lanercost"	Maddy Prior, Rick Kemp	* Maddy Prior lead vocals: Rick Kemp bass, guitar, vocals; Vince Cross DX7	4:32
9.	"Scarecrow" (The Battle of Cropredy Bridge)	Bob Johnson	* Bob Johnson lead vocals, guitar: Vince Cross DX7	4:13
10.	"Take My Heart"	Rick Kemp	* Maddy Prior lead vocals: Rick Kemp bass, guitar, vocals	3:58

== Personnel ==
Steeleye Span

- Bob Johnson – vocals, guitar
- Rick Kemp – vocals, bass guitar
- Peter Knight – vocals, violin, piano
- Nigel Pegrum – drums
- Maddy Prior – vocals

Guest musician

- Vince Cross – DX7
