= Ken Nicol (musician) =

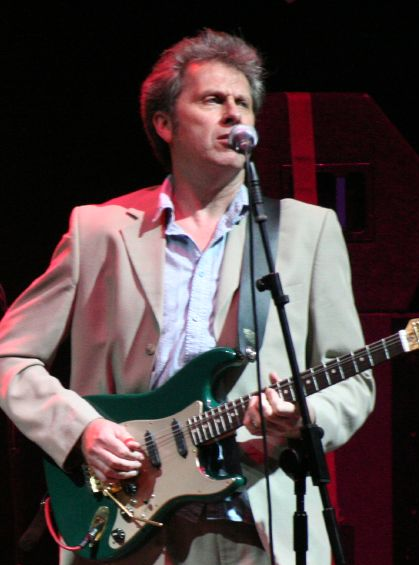
- Liam Genockey (left) and Nicol at Fairport's Cropredy Convention 2006

Background information
- Born: Kenneth Stephen Nicol; 27 May 1951 (age 75); Preston, Lancashire, England
- Genres: Rock; folk; British folk rock
- Occupations: Singer; songwriter; record producer
- Instruments: Vocals; guitar; ukulele; banjo
- Years active: 1974–present
- Website: www.kennicol.co.uk

Kenneth Stephen Nicol (born 27 May 1951) is an English guitar player, vocalist and songwriter. He was a member of The Albion Band for many years, and for eight years (2002–2010) played in British folk rock band Steeleye Span.

== Early years ==
Nicol was born in 1951 in Preston, Lancashire. He grew up in Deepdale, close to Preston North End's football ground, but was educated from the age of eleven at Penwortham Secondary Modern. Nicol did not like school, experiencing the discipline as brutal. He did not flourish academically, in spite of his intelligence, but made good friendships. His musical abilities were not recognised by the school. He received his first guitar at the age of twelve, but did not start playing seriously until the age of fifteen. Aged 17, he began performing on the regional folk club circuits, and at the age of twenty moved to London.

== Breakthrough ==
Nicol formed the band Nicol & Marsh with his then brother-in-law Peter Marsh in 1974, and it was not long before they landed their first major record contract with CBS. Together with Richard James Burgess, the band became Easy Street. They went on to produce a total of four albums on the CBS/Epic and Polydor labels; the last album, titled Nicol and Marsh, being recorded in Los Angeles. Working there prompted Nicol to make his home in the United States, moving there in 1979. He performed as a solo artist, and later as lead singer and co-writer for the band Versailles.

Nicol's career floundered during what turned out to be a turbulent and unsettling period in America. As a result of this he decided to return to England in 1988, and went back to work on the club circuit as a solo performer, releasing the albums Tidings (1990), Living in a Spanish Town (1993) and 2 Frets from the Blues (1995).

== Later years ==
In the 1990s Nicol joined the Ashley Hutchings Dance Band. He later joined The Albion Band as lead guitarist and singer, writing much of the band's material, though also co-writing with Ashley Hutchings. The Albion Band produced four albums during Nicol's time in the band: Happy Accident, Before Us Stands Yesterday, The Christmas Album and Road Movies.

In December 2002, Nicol joined the folk-rock band Steeleye Span on their UK Reunion Tour. In 2004, Steeleye Span released two albums: They Called Her Babylon and Winter. This was also the year of Steeleye Span's 35th Anniversary World Tour which took the band to Australia, New Zealand, Denmark, and to theatres and festivals throughout the UK. They released the album Bloody Men in 2006, and in October 2009 the album Cogs, Wheels and Lovers.

In 2010, he left Steeleye Span. He continues to write, tour and record as a solo artist, releasing the albums Thirteen Reasons in 2005 and Initial Variations in 2008. He appears in duos with comedian/musician Phil Cool, and with Albion Band/Steeleye Span founder Ashley Hutchings. In November and December 2010, he performed as "special guest guitarist" with Lancashire folk group the Houghton Weavers. Nicol also co-hosts a folk and roots music podcast, FolkCast.

In 2017–2018 Nicol formed a trio with former Steeleye Span bass player Rick Kemp and 10cc drummer Paul Burgess.

== Discography ==
Nicol & Marsh / Easy Street

- Nicol & Marsh's Easy Street (LP) (1974)
- "I've Been Praying" (single) (1974)
- "Midnight Cat" (single) (1974)
- "Sinking Down" (single) (1975)
- Easy Street (LP) (1976)
- "I've Been Loving You" (single) (1976)
- "Feels Like Heaven" (single) (1976)
- Under the Glass (LP) (1977)
- "Flying" (single) (1977)
- Nicol and Marsh (LP) (1978)
- "Hurt by Love" (single) (1978)
- "Streets of the Angels" (single) (1978)

Ken Nicol solo

- Ken Nicol (cassette) (1988)
- Little Children's Blues (cassette) (1988)
- Holywood This, Hollywood That (cassette) (1989)
- Tidings (1990)
- Across the Spectrum (live) (1991)
- Living in a Spanish Town (CD) (1993)
- 2 Frets from the Blues (CD) (1995)
- Clean Feet, No Shoes (CD) (1998)
- The Bridge (CD) (2001)
- Thirteen Reasons (CD) (2005)
- Live in Florence (CD) (2006)
- Tidings (CD) (2006)
- Ken Nicol (CD) (2007)
- Little Children's Blues (CD) (2007)
- Initial Variations CD (2008)
- Historic Events and Other Subjects CD (2012)
- Things CD (2015)

Ken Nicol and John St Ryan

- "Last Night in Paris" (single) (1994)

Ken Nicol and Chris While

- Shadows on the Wall (1995)

The Albion Band

- Happy Accident (1998)
- Before Us Stands Yesterday (1999)
- Christmas Album (1999)
- Road Movies (2001)
- An Evening with the Albion Band (2002)

Steeleye Span

- They Called Her Babylon (2004)
- Winter (2004)
- The Official Bootleg (2005)
- Bloody Men (2006)
- Cogs Wheels and Lovers (2009)

Ken Nicol & Phil Cool

- Nicol & Cool (2008)

Ken Nicol & Ashley Hutchings

- Copper, Russet and Gold (2010)

=== Session recordings ===
- 24 Carrots (Al Stewart) (1980)
- Shot in the Dark (1980)
- Road Dreams (Kevin Brown) (1983)
- Some Love (Les Barker) (1992)
- Look at Me Now (Chris While) (1992)
- Spun from a Silken Web (Ron Lister) (1994)
- Blue Moon on the Rise (Chris While & Julie Matthews) (1995)
- Such Is Life (Julie Matthews) (1995)
- Nice Work (Clare Teal) (1996)
- A Batter Pudding for John Keats (Ashley Hutchings) (1996)
- The Guv'nor Vol 4 (various artists) (1996)
- The HTD Summer Folk Selection (various artists) (1996)
- Piecework (Chris while and Julie Matthews) (1997)
- Folk Aerobics (Ashley Hutchings) (1997)
- Kate Howden and Paul Jones (Kate Howden and Paul Jones) (1999)
- Ridgeriders (The Ridgeriders) (1999)
- Pete (Pete Abbott) (2000)
- Pendle Moon (Phil Brown) (2000)
- Stages (Chris While and Julie Matthews) (2000)
- Classic Folk No. 1 (various artists) (2000)
- Along the Downs (various artists) (2000)
- Silver Waters (Kate Howden and Paul Jones (2001)
- Street Cries (Ashley Hutchings) (2001)
- Grandson of Morris On (Ashley Hutchings) (2002)
- Against the Wall (Pete Abbott) (2002)
- Human Nature (Ashley Hutchings) (2003)
- Great Grandson of Morris On (Ashley Hutchings & various artists) 2004
- The Magic of Morris (various artists) (2005)
- Midwinter (various artists) (2006)
- Manic Morning Music (Ernesto de Pascale) (2007)
