= Cogs, Wheels & Lovers =

2009 studio album by Steeleye Span

Studio album by Steeleye Span
- Released: October 2009
- Recorded: 2009
- Genre: British folk rock
- Label: Park Records
- Producer: Steeleye Span with Mark Ellis and Tony Poole

Steeleye Span chronology
Bloody Men (2006)	Cogs, Wheels & Lovers (2009)	Wintersmith (2013)

Cogs, Wheels & Lovers is the twenty-first studio album by British folk rock band Steeleye Span. It was released on 26 October 2009. It is the band's fourth studio album to feature the line-up of Maddy Prior, Peter Knight, Rick Kemp, Ken Nicol and Liam Genockey.

The songs on the album are entirely traditional pieces. As such, this album marks a return to the band's early pattern of recording modern arrangements of traditional songs, and marks a departure of its tendency, demonstrated since the early 1980s, of doing both traditional songs and songs they wrote themselves.

Cogs, Wheels and Lovers was the last album to feature guitarist Ken Nicol.

== Personnel ==
Steeleye Span

- Maddy Prior - vocals
- Peter Knight - violin, vocals
- Rick Kemp - bass, vocals
- Ken Nicol - guitar, vocals
- Liam Genockey - drums, percussion

== Track listing ==
1. "Gallant Frigate Amphitrite"
2. "Locks and Bolts"
3. "Creeping Jane"
4. "Just as the Tide"
5. "Ranzo"
6. "The Machiner's Song"
7. "Our Captain Cried"
8. "Two Constant Lovers"
9. "Madam will you Walk"
10. "The Unquiet Grave"
11. "Thornaby Woods", followed by the 'hidden track', "The Great Silkie of Sule Skerry"
