= Est'd 1969 =

Studio album by Steeleye Span
- Released: 28 June 2019
- Studio: Broadoak Studios, Bexhill-on-Sea; Stones Barn, Cumbria; King Edward Studios, London; Draycott Studios, London; Hassage Studios, Somerset; Park Media Studio
- Length: 51:19
- Label: Park Records

Steeleye Span chronology
Dodgy Bastards (2016)	Est'd 1969 (2019)	Conflict (2025)

Est'd 1969 is the twenty-fourth studio album by Steeleye Span, released on 28 June 2019.

== Track listing ==
1. "Harvest" (Steeleye Span) – 7:29
2. "Old Matron" (Steeleye Span) – 5:00
3. "The January Man" (Dave Goulder) – 4:47
4. "The Boy and the Mantle (Three Tests of Chastity)" (Traditional) – 6:29
5. "Mackerel of the Sea" (Traditional) – 6:39
6. "Cruel Ship’s Carpenter" (Traditional) – 6:23
7. "Domestic" (Traditional) – 6:28
8. "Roadways" (music: Steeleye Span; lyrics: John Masefield) – 5:02
9. "Reclaimed" (Rose Kemp) – 3:12

== Personnel ==
Steeleye Span

- Maddy Prior – vocals
- Liam Genockey – drums, percussion
- Julian Littman – guitar, mandolin, keyboards, vocals
- Jessica May Smart – violin, vocals
- Andrew "Spud" Sinclair – guitar, vocals
- Benji Kirkpatrick – bouzouki, guitar, mandolin, banjo, vocals
- Roger Carey – bass, vocals

Additional personnel

- Ian Anderson – flute on "Old Matron"
- Sophie Yates – harpsichord on "The Boy and the Mantle"
