= Wintersmith (album) =

Studio album by Steeleye Span
- Released: 28 October 2013
- Recorded: 2013
- Genre: British folk rock, progressive rock
- Label: Park Records
- Producer: Chris Tsangarides

Steeleye Span chronology
Cogs, Wheels and Lovers (2009)	Wintersmith (2013)	Dodgy Bastards (2016)

Wintersmith is the twenty-second studio album by British folk rock band Steeleye Span. It was released in October 2013. It features the line-up of Maddy Prior, Peter Knight, Rick Kemp, Julian Littman, Pete Zorn and Liam Genockey. Guest musicians are Terry Pratchett (voice), Kathryn Tickell (Northumbrian pipes), Bob Johnson (vocals), and John Spiers (melodeon).

The songs on the album were inspired principally by Wintersmith and other Discworld books featuring Tiffany Aching. There is a spoken contribution by the author, Terry Pratchett.

A double CD Deluxe Edition was released in October 2014: the second disc featured a mixture of new tracks, live performances and demos.

== Personnel ==
Steeleye Span

- Maddy Prior – vocals
- Peter Knight – violin, vocals (except CD2, tracks 1–4)
- Jessie May Smart – violin on "deluxe version" CD2, tracks 1 to 4
- Rick Kemp – bass, vocals
- Julian Littman – guitar, piano, vocals
- Pete Zorn – acoustic guitar, saxophone, vocals
- Liam Genockey – drums, percussion

with:

- John Spiers – melodeon
- Kathryn Tickell – Northumbrian pipes
- Bob Johnson – vocals
- Terry Pratchett – voice (spoken word)

== Tracks ==
All tracks on the standard edition and the deluxe edition are written by Steeleye Span and Terry Pratchett. The primary credited writer (or writers) is noted below.

=== 2013 Standard Edition ===
No.	Title	Writer(s)	Lead vocals	Length
1.	"Overture"	Bob Johnson/Peter Knight	Prior
2.	"The Dark Morris Song"	Julian Littman	Prior
3.	"Wintersmith"	Rick Kemp	Kemp
4.	"You"	Littman	Littman
5.	"The Good Witch"	Maddy Prior	Prior, Terry Pratchett (spoken word)
6.	"Band of Teachers"	Prior	Prior
7.	"The Wee Free Men"	Johnson	Johnson, Prior
8.	"Hiver"	Prior	Prior
9.	"Fire and Ice"	Kemp	Kemp
10.	"The Making of a Man"	Knight	Knight
11.	"Crown of Ice"	Kemp	Kemp
12.	"First Dance"	Kemp	Prior
13.	"The Dark Morris Tune"	Knight	Instrumental
14.	"The Summer Lady"	Littman	Littman
15.	"Ancient Eyes"	Johnson	Prior
16.	"We Shall Wear Midnight"	Knight	Knight

=== 2014 Deluxe Edition ===
Tracks - Deluxe Edition Disc 2:

1. "To Be Human"
2. "Be Careful What You Wish for"
3. "Granny Aching"
4. "Just One Heart"
5. "You" (live)
6. "Ancient Eyes" (live)
7. "The Dark Morris Tune" (live)
8. "The Dark Morris Song" (live)
9. "The Making of a Man" (live)
10. "Crown of Ice" (live)
11. "Summer Lady" (live)
12. "We Shall Wear Midnight" (live)
13. "Ancient Eyes" (demo)
14. "The Wee Free Men" (demo)

== Chart performance ==
Wintersmith debuted at No. 77 on the UK Albums Chart.

== Critical reception ==
The album received very positive reviews and has been described as "a marriage between the written word and music that is devastatingly superb."

Folk Radio UK hailed the release as "a concept album it has that feel of being made for a stage production".
