= Time (Steeleye Span album) =

Studio album by Steeleye Span
- Released: 1996
- Recorded: 1996
- Genre: British folk rock
- Label: Park Records (UK), Shanachie (US)
- Producer: Steeleye Span

Steeleye Span chronology
Tonight's the Night...Live (1995)	Time (1996)	Horkstow Grange (1998)

Professional ratings
Review scores
Source	Rating
Allmusic	3/5 stars

Time is the fourteenth studio album by Steeleye Span. The album was released in 1996, after a seven-year hiatus, and was their first on the Park Records label. The impetus for the album was a 25th anniversary reunion tour the year before, during which most of the former members of the band performed together. Maddy Prior was experiencing voice problems so she spoke to Gay Woods, a founding member who had left the band after the first album, to rejoin. Woods initially resisted this move, since she had not performed publicly for some time, but Prior eventually prevailed and Woods returned to the band. The result was only the second Steeleye Span album to feature two female singers, which was used on the ironic "Old Maid in the Garrett" and to a lesser extent on "The Prickly Bush" and "The Cutty Wren". Both Prior and Woods provide lead vocals on different songs. Prior's voice troubles are reflected in her musical choices on this album; she generally sings less powerfully and in a lower range. Woods also introduced a few Irish elements to the bands' repertoire, including the "Old Maid in the Garrett/Tam Lin reel" and her bodhrán. This album was to be Prior's last album with Steeleye Span until 2002's Present.

In some ways, the album represents a revival of Steeleye Span. After a sixteen-year period in which the band released only three albums, the band entered a more productive phase that continues to the present; producing an album once every two years, including two in 2004.

The song "Corbies" is a remake of "Twa Corbies", which appears on Hark! The Village Wait. The theme of "The Cutty Wren" had also been explored before, in the song "The King" on Please to See the King, as well in "Hunting the Wren" on Live at Last. In this version, the band experimented with a complex scheme of vocal and instrumental placement, which is best appreciated with headphones. Overall, this version is much darker than "The King" and somewhat menacing.

The album's sound is rather fuller and more lush than their earlier albums, thanks in part to the addition of Harries' keyboards on several songs, most notably "Corbies" and "The Elf Knight".

== Track listing ==
1. "The Prickly Bush"
2. "Old Maid in the Garrett/Tam Lin reel"
3. "Harvest of the Moon"
4. "Underneath Her Apron"
5. "The Cutty Wren"
6. "Go from My Window"
7. "The Elf Knight"
8. "The Water is Wide"
9. "You Will Burn"
10. "Corbies"
11. "The Song Will Remain"

== Personnel ==
Steeleye Span

- Maddy Prior - vocals
- Gay Woods - vocals, bodhrán
- Bob Johnson - vocals, electric guitar
- Peter Knight - vocals, violin
- Tim Harries - bass, keyboards, vocals
- Liam Genockey - drums, percussion
