= Tonight's the Night...Live =

Live album by Steeleye Span
- Released: September 1992
- Recorded: 1991
- Genre: British folk rock
- Label: Sanachie
- Producer: Peter Knight, John Etchells

Steeleye Span chronology
Tempted and Tried (1989)	Tonight's the Night...Live (1992)	Time (1996)

Tonight's the Night...Live is the second live album by British folk rock band Steeleye Span.

During the 1980s, Steeleye released only three albums. By 1991, the band was revitalized through the arrival of bassist Tim Harries and drummer Liam Genockey. Harries was younger than the other band members, and new blood returned the band to full-time activity. Steeleye found a fresh perspective on old material, as is evident on Tonight's the Night...Live, which balances the band's rock and folk roots.

The album includes new arrangements of several songs from earlier albums, some of them different from the earlier versions: "Cam Ye O'er Frae France" from Parcel of Rogues, "All Around My Hat" from All Around My Hat (preferred by some to the original), "Fighting for Strangers" from Rocket Cottage, "White Man" from Back in Line, and "Padstow" from Tempted and Tried. "The Weaver and the Factory Maid" (from Parcel of Rogues) is effective. With a thrumming bass line, clicking percussion and repetitive violin and guitar lines, the song conveys the sense of a factory full of power looms.

The other half of the album is new pieces. The most experimental is "Tam Lin", Fairport Convention's signature tune. To find a new approach to the song, Knight traced the Tam Lin story to Bulgarian folklore, combining three Bulgarian folk songs for Prior to sing. More upbeat are "Tonight's the Night" and "The Gentleman Soldier". "Ten Long Years" is a nod to the band's a cappella pieces.

== Track listing ==
1. "Tonight's the Night" 3:34
2. "Ca the Ewes" 4:44
3. "Gentleman Soldier" 3:32
4. "Tam Lin" 10:46
5. "Padstow" 3:25
6. "Fighting for Strangers" 5:31
7. "White Man" 4:45
8. "The Weaver" 6:04
9. "Ten Long Years" 2:19
10. "Dawn of the Day" 5:25
11. "Cam Ye" 6:12
12. "All Around My Hat" 4:19

== Personnel ==
Steeleye Span

- Maddy Prior - vocals
- Peter Knight - violin, vocals
- Bob Johnson - guitar, vocals
- Tim Harries - bass, vocals
- Liam Genockey - drums
