= Benji Kirkpatrick =

English folk singer and musician

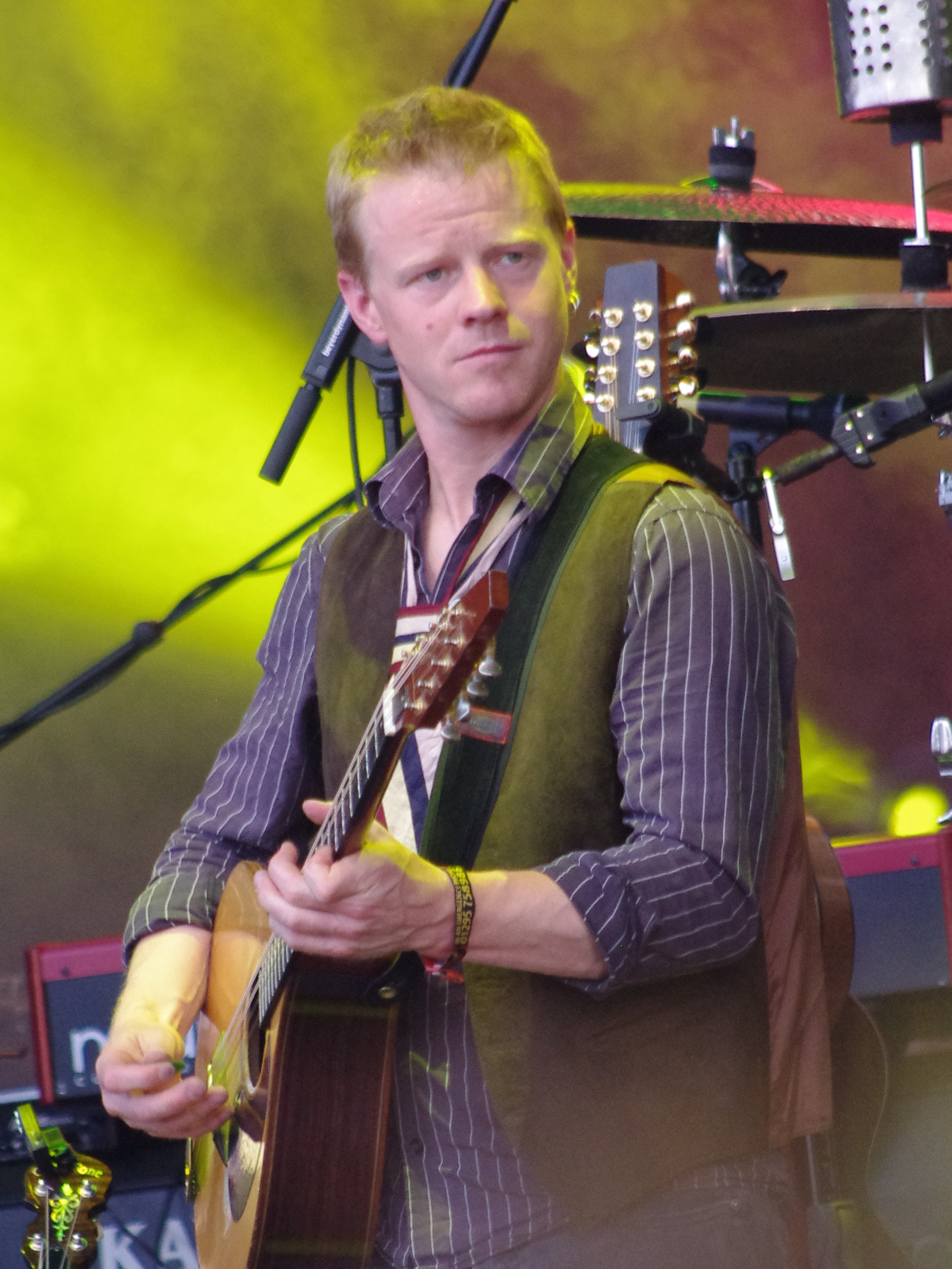
Kirkpatrick performing with Bellowhead in 2012

Benji Kirkpatrick (born 1976) is an English folk singer and musician, who plays guitar, bouzouki, mandolin and tenor banjo. A son of folk musicians John Kirkpatrick and Sue Harris, he was brought up in Shropshire. Previously a member of Bellowhead, Faustus and Steeleye Span, he now performs as a solo artist and also as a member of the Seth Lakeman band. He lives in Leamington Spa, Warwickshire.

Kirkpatrick's album of acoustic covers of Jimi Hendrix songs was released in 2015.

== Discography ==
=== EPs ===
- People, EDJ Records – EDJ014, 2007

=== Albums ===
- Dance in the Shadow, WildGoose Studios – WGS291CD, 1998
- Half a Fruit Pie, Fellside Recordings – FECD181, 2004
- Boomerang, Navigator Records – NAVIGATOR 2, 2007
- Hendrix Songs, EDJ Records – EDJ020, 2015
- Gold Has Worn Away, Westpark, 2019
- In Phase, Hedgerow Recordings (UK), Westpark (EU), 2023
