= Winter (Steeleye Span album) =

Music album by Steeleye Span

Studio album by Steeleye Span
- Released: 2004
- Studio: Warehouse Studios, Oxford
- Genre: British folk rock Christmas music
- Length: 59:02
- Label: Park Records
- Producer: Steeleye Span

Steeleye Span chronology
They Called Her Babylon (2004)	Winter (2004)	Bloody Men (2006)

Winter is the 19th studio album by British folk rock band Steeleye Span. It is the second album made by a line-up consisting of Maddy Prior, Peter Knight, Rick Kemp, Liam Genockey and Ken Nicol. This is their first Christmas album. Most of the songs on the album are traditional folk songs, but it also includes three new pieces expressing neo-pagan views on the Winter season. It also includes a negro spiritual, "Blow Your Trumpet Gabriel", the first time the band had drawn from that particular musical genre.

It was described by Record Collector as "Christmas carols alongside more Pagan material."

== Personnel ==
Steeleye Span

- Maddy Prior - vocals
- Peter Knight - backing vocals, violin, viola, electric piano
- Rick Kemp - bass guitar
- Liam Genockey - drums
- Ken Nicol - guitar, vocals

== Track listing ==
1. "The First Nowell" - 4:23
2. "Down in Yon Forest" - 3:44
3. "Unconquered Sun" (Ken Nicol) - 5:22
4. "Chanticleer" (William Austin) - 4:17
5. "Bright Morning Star" - 3:15
6. "Winter" (Peter Knight) - 4:13
7. "See, Amid the Winter's Snow" (words - Edward Caswall, music - Sir John Goss) - 5:47
8. "Mistletoe Bough" (Ken Nicol) - 5:35
9. "Sing We the Virgin Mary" - 3:41
10. "Today in Bethlehem" - 3:40
11. "Blow Your Trumpet Gabriel" - 2:54
12. "Hark! The Herald Angels Sing" (words - Charles Wesley) - 4:29
13. "Good King Wenceslas" (words - John Mason Neale) - 3:36
14. "In the Bleak Midwinter" (words - Christina Rossetti, music - Gustav Holst) - 4:06
