= Cornbury Music Festival =

Music festival in Oxfordshire, England

Cornbury Festival
- Frequency: Annually
- Locations: Cornbury Park, Oxfordshire, England; Great Tew Park, Oxfordshire, England
- Inaugurated: 2004
- Attendance: c. 20,000
- Website: cornburyfestival.com

Cornbury Music Festival is an annual music festival that takes place in Great Tew Park in Oxfordshire, England.

== History ==
Cornbury Festival was founded by music promoter Hugh Phillimore.

It was originally set up on Robin Cayzer, 3rd Baron Rotherwick’s Oxfordshire estate, Cornbury Park, and has been given the nickname “Poshstock” in national press. The festival moved to Great Tew Park in 2011.

The 2017 edition of the festival was originally announced as the last, but this decision was subsequently reversed.

== Recent Headliners ==
- 2022: Bryan Adams, James Blunt, Ronan Keating
- 2019: The Specials, Keane, The Beach Boys
- 2018: Squeeze, Alanis Morissette, UB40
- 2017: Bryan Adams, the Pretenders, Jools Holland, Kaiser Chiefs
- 2012: James Morrison, Elvis Costello, Jools Holland
- 2011: Ray Davies
- 2010: Noisettes, Candi Staton, Dr John, David Gray, Seth Lakeman, Jackson Browne
- 2009: The Pretenders
- 2007: The Proclaimers, Suzanne Vega, Hothouse Flowers, Echo & the Bunnymen
- 2006: Robert Plant

== Notable attendees ==
David Cameron attended the festival with his wife Samantha in both 2008 and 2012. Mark Carney attended in 2012.
