= They Called Her Babylon =

Studio album by Steeleye Span
- Released: 2004
- Recorded: 2004
- Genre: British folk rock
- Label: Park
- Producer: Steeleye Span

Steeleye Span chronology
Present--The Very Best of Steeleye Span (2002)	They Called Her Babylon (2004)	Winter (2004)

Professional ratings
Review scores
Source	Rating
Allmusic	3.5/5 stars

They Called Her Babylon is an album by British folk rock band Steeleye Span. The title track deals with the Siege of Lathom House in 1644, during the English Civil War, during which Charlotte Stanley, Countess of Derby, held out for four months against Parliamentarian efforts to take the house.

The album, the band's 18th studio album, was released in 2004. The album is perhaps most noteworthy for the return of Maddy Prior, the band's most central member, who had departed the band in 1996. Returning with Prior was her husband, Rick Kemp, who had not performed with the band since its 12th album, although both Prior and Kemp had performed on Present--The Very Best of Steeleye Span, an album that re-recorded versions of songs from earlier albums. Gay Woods, who had replaced Prior for two albums, departed at the same time. New to the band with this album was guitarist Ken Nicol, while drummer Liam Genockey, who had played on Time, returned. Longtime violinist Peter Knight rounded out the group.

Highlights of the album include 'Van Diemen's Land', a song about poaching and deportation to what would eventually be called Tasmania; 'Heir of Linne', a classic ballad of riches lost and regained, and 'Child Owlet', another traditional ballad whose gruesomeness is underlined by Prior's powerful vocals. The album also contains the band's shortest song ever, a 40-second version of 'Bede's Death Song', an early medieval poem attributed to the 8th century monk.

In the original version of 'Van Diemen's Land', the narrator is a man, but Prior reworked the lyrics to make the narrator a woman

The album received very mixed reviews. Some critics saw it as a return to form after several less-satisfying albums, and attributed the band's revival to Prior's return. Others saw the album as representing a continuing decline of the band, attributing it to the aging of the band's core members, and noting that Prior's voice, while still strong and effective on songs like 'Van Dieman's Land' and 'Child Owlet', does not seem to have its top range any more.

== Personnel ==
Steeleye Span

- Maddy Prior - vocals
- Rick Kemp - vocals, bass
- Peter Knight - vocals, violin, Octave violin, keyboards
- Ken Nicol - vocals, guitar
- Liam Genockey - drums

== Track listing ==
1. "Van Diemen's Land", the historic name for Tasmania
2. "Samain" named for the Samhain festival
3. "Heir of Linne"
4. "Bride's Farewell"
5. "They Called Her Babylon"
6. "Mantle of Green"
7. "Bede's Death Song"
8. "Diversus and Lazarus"
9. "Si Begh Si Mohr"
10. "Child Owlet"
11. "What's the Life of a Man?"
