= Present – The Very Best of Steeleye Span =

Present--The Very Best of Steeleye Span

Studio album by Steeleye Span
- Released: 2002
- Recorded: 2002
- Genre: British folk rock
- Label: Park
- Producer: Steeleye Span/Steve Watkins

Steeleye Span chronology
Bedlam Born (2000)	Present--The Very Best of Steeleye Span (2002)	They Called Her Babylon (2004)

Present – The Very Best of Steeleye Span is the 17th studio album by Steeleye Span, released in 2002. The album contains new recordings of previously released songs.

== Personnel ==
- Maddy Prior - vocals
- Rick Kemp - bass, vocals, guitar
- Peter Knight - organ, mandolin, octave violin, violin, electric violin, vocals, piano
- Bob Johnson - acoustic guitar, electric guitar, vocals
- Liam Genockey - drums, cymbals

== Track listing ==
Disc 1:

1. "Sir James the Rose"
2. "Hard Times of Old England"
3. "Cam Ye O'er Frae France"
4. "Thomas the Rhymer"
5. "Lyke-Wake Dirge"
6. "Black Jack Davey"
7. "Two Magicians"
8. "Blackleg Miner"
9. "All Around My Hat"

Disc 2:

1. "When I Was On Horseback"
2. "John Barleycorn"
3. "Long Lankin" (Roud 6, Child 93)
4. "One Misty Moisty Morning"
5. "Let Her Go Down"
6. "Gaudete"
7. "The Weaver and the Factory Maid"
8. "Drink Down the Moon"
9. "King Henry"
10. "Rosebud in June (hidden track)"
