= Steeleye Span =

English folk rock band, formed 1969

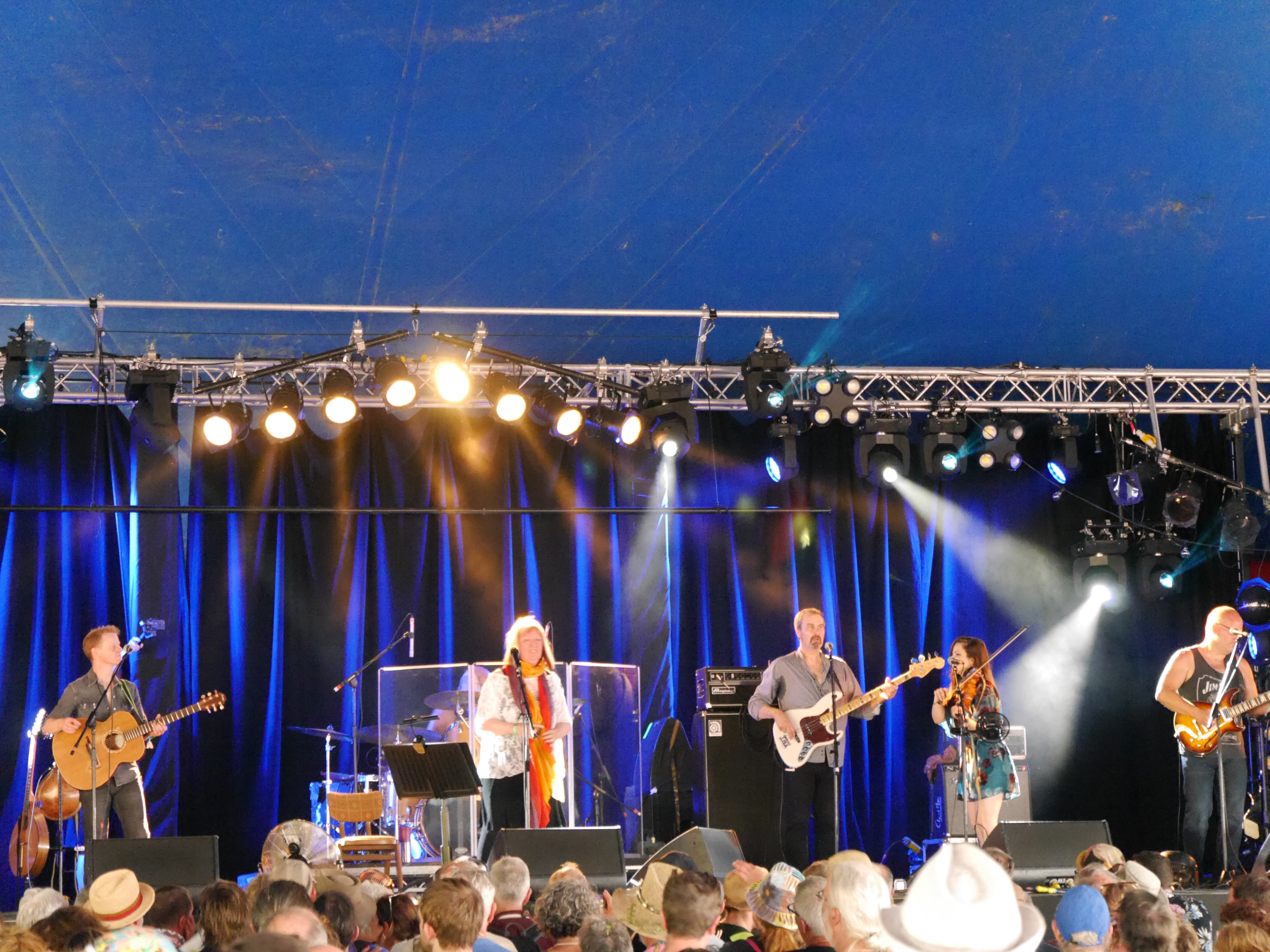
- At the Glastonbury Festival, 2019

Background information
- Origin: London, England
- Genre: British folk rock
- Years active: 1969–1978, 1980–present
- Labels: Park; Shanachie; Chrysalis; Flutterby; Mooncrest; B&C
- Spinoffs: The Woods Band; The Carnival Band; Silly Sisters
- Spinoff of: Fairport Convention
- Members: Maddy Prior; Andrew Sinclair; Roger Carey; Liam Genockey; Julian Littman; Athena Octavia; Jessie May Smart; Violeta Vicci
- Past members: Peter Knight; Pete Zorn; Tim Hart; Rick Kemp; Ashley Hutchings; Terry Woods; Gay Woods; Martin Carthy; Bob Johnson; Nigel Pegrum; John Kirkpatrick; Mark Williamson; Chris Staines; Tim Harries; Michael Gregory; Terl Bryant; Ken Nicol; Benji Kirkpatrick
- Website: steeleyespan.org.uk

Steeleye Span are a British folk rock band formed in 1969 in England by Fairport Convention bass player Ashley Hutchings and established London folk club duo Tim Hart and Maddy Prior. The band were part of the 1970s British folk revival, and were commercially successful in that period, with four Top 40 albums and two hit singles: "Gaudete" and "All Around My Hat".

Steeleye Span have seen many personnel changes, with Maddy Prior being the only remaining original member of the band. Their musical repertoire consists of mostly traditional songs with one or two instrumental tracks of jigs and/or reels added; the traditional songs often include some of the Child Ballads. In their later albums there has been an increased tendency to include music written by the band members, but they have never moved completely away from traditional music, which draws upon pan-British traditions.

== History ==
=== Early years ===
Steeleye Span began in late 1969, when London-born bass player Ashley Hutchings left Fairport Convention, the band he had co-founded in 1967. Fairport had been involved in a road accident in 1969 in which the drummer, Martin Lamble, and guitarist Richard Thompson's girlfriend, Jeannie Franklyn, were killed and other band members injured. The survivors convalesced in a rented house near Winchester in Hampshire and worked on the album Liege & Lief. Despite the success of that album, Hutchings and the band's vocalist Sandy Denny left Fairport Convention.

In part, Hutchings departed because he wanted to pursue a different, more traditional, direction than the other members of Fairport did at that time. Fairport's co-founder, guitarist Simon Nicol, stated: "Whatever the upfront reasons about musical differences and wanting to concentrate on traditional material, I think the accident was the underlying reason why Ashley felt he couldn't continue with us."

Hutchings's new band was formed after he met established duo Tim Hart and Maddy Prior on the London folk club scene, and the initial line-up was completed by husband-and-wife team Terry Woods (formerly of Sweeney's Men, later of The Pogues) and Gay Woods. The name Steeleye Span comes from a character in the traditional song "Horkstow Grange" (which they did not actually record until they released an album by that name in 1998). The song gives an account of a fight between John "Steeleye" Span and John Bowlin, neither of whom is proven to have been a real person. Martin Carthy gave Hart the idea to name the band after the song character. When the band discussed names, they decided to choose among three suggestions: "Middlemarch Wait", "Iyubidin's Wait", and "Steeleye Span". Although there were only five members in the band, six ballots appeared and "Steeleye Span" won. Only in 1978 did Hart confess that he had voted twice. The liner notes for their first album include thanks to Carthy for the name suggestion.

With two female singers, the original line-up was unusual for the time, and indeed, never performed live, as the Woodses departed the band shortly after the release of the group's debut album, Hark! The Village Wait (1970). While recording the album, the five members were all living in the same house, an arrangement that produced considerable tensions particularly between Hart and Prior on the one hand and the Woodses on the other. Terry Woods maintains that the members had agreed that if more than one person departed, the remaining members would select a new name, and he was upset that this did not happen when he and Gay Woods left the band. The Woodses were replaced by veteran folk musician Martin Carthy and fiddler Peter Knight in a longer-term line-up that toured small concert venues, recorded a number of BBC Radio Sessions, and recorded two albums – Please to See the King and Ten Man Mop, or Mr. Reservoir Butler Rides Again (both 1971). While the first album was traditionally performed – guitars, bass and with two guest drummers – Please to See the King was revolutionary in its hard electric sound and lack of drums.

In 1971, the then Steeleye Span line-up minus Maddy Prior contributed to two songs on Scottish folk musician Ray Fisher's album The Bonny Birdy; Martin Carthy and Ashley Hutchings were also involved in the selection and arrangement of some songs released on this album, and Hutchings wrote the sleeve notes. Furthermore, Martin Carthy and Peter Knight performed on four songs released on Roy Bailey's eponymous debut album in 1971.

=== A new direction ===
Shortly after the release of their third album, the band brought in manager Jo Lustig, who brought a more commercial sound to their recordings. At that time, traditionalists Carthy and Hutchings left the band to pursue purely folk projects. Their replacements were electric guitarist Bob Johnson and bass player Rick Kemp, who brought strong rock and blues influences to the sound. Rick Kemp subsequently married Maddy Prior and they had two children before eventually divorcing. Their daughter Rose Kemp and their son Alex (who performs as Kemp) both followed their parents into the music industry.

Lustig signed them to the Chrysalis record label, for a deal that was to last for ten albums.

In August 1972, the band, with the line up of Maddy Prior, Tim Hart, Bob Johnson, Peter Knight and Rick Kemp, provided the music for the Royal Lyceum Theatre Company's production of Keith Dewhurst's dramatic adaptation of Robert Louis Stevenson's novel Kidnapped during the Edinburgh International Festival.

With the release of their fourth album, Below the Salt, in September 1972, the revised line-up had settled on a distinctive electrified rock sound, although they continued to play mostly arrangements of very traditional material, including songs dating back a hundred years or more. Even on the more commercial Parcel of Rogues (1973), the band had no permanent drummer; however, in 1973, rock drummer Nigel Pegrum, who had previously recorded with Gnidrolog, The Small Faces and Uriah Heep, joined them, to harden up their sound (as well as occasionally playing flute and oboe).

Also that year the single "Gaudete" from Below the Salt became a Christmas hit single, reaching number 14 in the UK Singles Chart, although, being an a cappella piece, taken from the late renaissance song collection Piae Cantiones from Finland and sung entirely in Latin, this can neither be considered representative of the band's music, nor of the album from which it was taken. This proved to be their commercial breakthrough and saw them performing on Top of the Pops for the first time. They often include it as a concert encore. Their popularity was also helped by the fact that they often performed as an opening act for fellow Chrysalis artists Jethro Tull. The Canadian single had "Royal Forester" as the b-side, and that song reached #10 on the RPM AC charts.

Their sixth album (and sixth member Pegrum's first with the band) was entitled Now We Are Six. Produced by Jethro Tull's Ian Anderson, the album includes the epic track "Thomas the Rhymer", which has been a part of the live set ever since. Although successful, the album is controversial among some fans for the inclusion of nursery rhymes sung by "The St. Eeleye School Choir" (band members singing in the style of children), and the cover of "To Know Him Is to Love Him", featuring a guest appearance from David Bowie on saxophone.

The attempts at humour continued on Commoners Crown (1975), which included Peter Sellers playing electric ukulele on the final track, "New York Girls". Their seventh album also included the epic ballad "Long Lankin" and novelty instrumental "Bach Goes To Limerick".

=== Mike Batt era ===
With their star now conspicuously ascendant, the band brought in producer Mike Batt to work on their eighth album, All Around My Hat, and their biggest success came with the release of the title track as a single – it reached number 5 in the UK Singles Chart in late 1975. The single was also released in other European countries and gave them a breakthrough in the Netherlands and Germany. Other well-known tracks on the album included "Black Jack Davy" (sampled by rappers Goldie Lookin Chain on their track "The Maggot") and the rocky "Hard Times of Old England". While All Around My Hat was the height of the band's commercial success, the good times were not to last long. Despite touring almost every year since 1975, they have not had another hit single, nor any success in the album chart, since the late 1970s.

The follow-up album, Rocket Cottage (1976), also produced by Batt, proved to be a commercial flop, despite having much in common musically with its predecessor. The opening track, "London", was penned by Rick Kemp as a follow-up to "All Around My Hat", in response to a request from the record label that Kemp describes as "we'll have another one of those, please", and released as a single. The song failed to make the UK Chart, in complete contrast to "All Around My Hat", despite having much in common – a 12/8 time signature, upbeat tempo, solo verses and full harmony chorus. Rocket Cottage also included the experimental track "Fighting for Strangers" (with sparse vocals singing concurrently in a variety of keys) and, on the final track, excerpts of studio banter between the band members and a seemingly impromptu rendition of "Camptown Races", in which Prior gets the lyrics wrong.

At the time of their seventh album, Commoners Crown, the advent of punk saw the mainstream market turning away from folk rock almost overnight, heralding a downturn in commercial fortunes for the band. As thanks to their committed fans, Steeleye Span showered attendees of a November 1976 concert in London with £8,500 in pound notes (then equivalent to US$13,600). According to Maddy Prior, the idea for the stunt came from manager Tony Secunda.

Contemporary press reports indicated that it took some time for the crowd to even realise what was happening. Thanks to their connection with Mike Batt, band members appeared in Womble costumes on Top of the Pops, performing the Wombles hit "Superwomble".

=== Late 1970s and early 1980s ===
While they never regained the commercial success of All Around My Hat, Steeleye remained popular among British folk rock fans and generally respected within the music industry. It has been widely reported that Peter Knight and Bob Johnson left the band to work on another project together, The King of Elfland's Daughter. The actual situation was more complex. Chrysalis Records agreed to allow Knight and Johnson to work on "King" only as a way to persuade the duo to continue working with Steeleye. Since the record company had no interest in "King" for its own sake, it made no effort to market the album. Chrysalis' ploy failed and Knight and Johnson quit.

Their departure left a significant hole in the band. For the 1977 album, Storm Force Ten, early member Martin Carthy rejoined on guitar. When he originally joined the band for their second album, Carthy had tried to persuade the others to bring John Kirkpatrick on board but the band had chosen Knight instead. This time, Carthy's suggestion was accepted and Kirkpatrick's accordion replaced Knight's fiddle, which gave the recording a very different texture from the Steeleye sound of previous years. Kirkpatrick's one-man morris dances quickly became one of the highlights of the band's show. This line-up also recorded their first album outside of the studio, Live at Last, before a "split" at the end of the decade that proved to be short-lived. Carthy and Kirkpatrick had only intended to play with the band for a few months and had no interest in a longer association.

During 1977 and some time thereafter, Nigel Pegrum and Rick Kemp created a "porno punk" band called The Pork Dukes, using pseudonyms. The Pork Dukes released several albums and singles over the years.

The band were contractually obliged to record a final album for the Chrysalis label and, with Carthy and Kirkpatrick not wanting to rejoin the re-formed band, the door was open for Knight and Johnson to return, in 1980. The album Sails of Silver saw the band moving away from traditional material to a greater focus on self-penned songs, many with historical or pseudo-folk themes. Sails was not a commercial success, in part because Chrysalis chose not to promote the album aggressively but also because many fans felt uncomfortable with the band's new direction in its choice of material. The failure of the album left Hart unhappy enough that he decided to leave the band. He later gave up commercial music entirely, in favour of a reclusive life in the Canary Islands.

After Sails of Silver there were to be no new albums for several years, and Steeleye became a part-time touring band. The other members spent much of their time and energy working on their various other projects and the band went into a fitful hibernation. "Sails of Silver" was used as a theme song for the science fiction literary show "Hour of The Wolf", on NYC radio station WBAI 99.5FM since the 1980s. This introduced many younger US listeners to the band.

In 1981, Isla St Clair presented a series of four television programmes, called "The Song and The Story", about the history of some folk songs, which won the Prix Jeunesse. St Clair sang the songs, and The Maddy Prior Band did the backing instrumentals.

=== Wilderness years ===
For much of the 1980s, the members of the band tended to focus on outside projects of various sorts. Johnson opened a restaurant and then studied for a degree in psychology at the University of Hertfordshire. Pegrum ran a music studio. Prior and Kemp devoted much energy to their own band — The Maddy Prior Band; see Maddy Prior (solo albums), recording four albums, and also had children together. The result was that the band's output dropped sharply, producing only three albums over the space of ten years (including a concert album), although the band continued touring.

After a quiet spell, the group's 12th studio album (and first without Tim Hart) Back in Line was released on the Flutterby label in 1986. With no "relaunch" as such, the band retained a low profile, although they covered "Blackleg Miner" (a composition to support an 1844 strike revised many times by folk artists in the 20th century) to show solidarity with striking miners. Some argued this became a political anthem for the NUM during the miners' strike of 1984–5 and was used to intimidate working miners. Steeleye Span continued to perform the song live and included a different version on their 1986 release Back in Line, which some claim puts greater stress on the line that threatens death against blacklegs.

In 1989, two long-term members departed. One was bassist Rick Kemp, who needed to recover from a serious shoulder injury, exacerbated by playing bass on stage. His eventual replacement (after two tours, each with a different bassist) was Tim Harries, who was brought in less than two weeks before the band was scheduled to start a tour. A friend of Pegrum's, Harries was a self-taught rock bassist, as well as a classically trained pianist and double bassist. With Harries on board, Steeleye released Tempted and Tried (1989), an album that formed the basis for their live set for many years to come.

Not long after recording Tempted, drummer Nigel Pegrum left the group to emigrate to Australia for personal relationship reasons. He was replaced by eccentric drummer Liam Genockey (most recently of rock band Gillan), easily identified by his long, plaited beard. He and Knight were simultaneously members of "Moiré Music", a free-jazz band with a classical flavour, led by Trevor Watts. Unlike Pegrum, who employed a traditional rock drumming style, Genockey favoured a more varied drumming style, influenced by both Irish and African drumming, in which he hit, brushed, and rubbed the various surfaces of his drums and cymbals, creating a more varied range of sounds. Consequently, when the band embarked on their 20th Anniversary Tour, they did so with a totally new rhythm section.

Both Harries and Genockey were interested in experimenting with the band's sound, and they helped re-energise the other members' interest in Steeleye. The band began reworking some of their earlier material, seeking new approaches to traditional favourites. For example, Johnson experimented with an arrangement of "Tam Lin", that involved a heavy Bulgarian influence, inspired by Eastern European versions of the Tam Lin legend. In 1992 the band released Tonight's the Night...Live, which demonstrates some of this new energy and direction. The band continued to tour the UK every year, and frequently toured overseas as well.

=== Maddy 'leaves the bus' ===
"Steeleye Span is like a bus. It goes along, and people get on and get off it. Sometimes the bus goes along the route you want to go, and sometimes it turns off, so you get off."

— Maddy Prior

In 1995, almost all the past and present members of the band reunited for a concert to celebrate the 25th Anniversary of the band (which was later released as The Journey). The only former members not present were founding members Terry Woods, Mark Williamson, and Chris Staines.

A by-product of this gig was founding vocalist Gay Woods rejoining the band full-time, partly because Prior was experiencing vocal problems and, for a while, Steeleye toured with two female singers and released the album Time in 1996, their first new studio album in seven years.

There were doubts over the future of the band when Prior announced her departure in 1997, but Steeleye continued in a more productive vein than for many years, with Woods as lead singer, releasing Horkstow Grange (1998), and then Bedlam Born (2000). Fans of Steeleye's "rock" element felt that Horkstow Grange was too quiet and folk-oriented, while fans of the band's "folk" element complained that Bedlam Born was too rock-heavy. Woods received considerable criticism from fans, many of whom did not realise that she was one of the founding members and who compared her singing style unfavourably to Prior's. There was also disagreement among the band about what material to perform; Woods advocated performing old favourites such as "All Around My Hat" and "Alison Gross", while Johnson favoured a set that emphasised their newer material.

Liam Genockey had also left the band in 1997 and, on these albums, the drum kit was manned by Dave Mattacks, who was not an official member of the band.

=== Breakup and comeback ===
Reported difficulties among band members saw a split during the recording of Bedlam Born. Woods reportedly was uncomfortable with the financial arrangements of the band, health problems forced Johnson into retirement, and drummer Dave Mattacks' period as an unofficial member came to an end. Rick Kemp resumed playing with the band as a guest replacing Bob Johnson for the Bedlam Born tour, with Harries switching to lead guitar. Woods then left after this tour.

For a while the band consisted of just Peter Knight and Tim Harries, plus various guest musicians, as they fulfilled live commitments. This was an uncertain time for the future of the band, and when Harries announced he was not keen to continue his role, even the willingness of Kemp to return to the line-up full-time was not enough to prevent an 18-month hiatus while Peter Knight and the band's manager, John Dagnell, considered whether it was worth continuing.

In 2002, Steeleye Span reformed with a "classic" line-up (including Prior), bringing an end to the uncertainty of the previous couple of years. Knight hosted a poll on his website, asking fans which Steeleye songs they most wanted to see the band rerecord. Armed with the results, Knight persuaded Prior and Genockey to rejoin, coaxed Johnson out of a health-induced retirement and, along with Kemp and Knight, they released Present—The Very Best of Steeleye Span (2002), a 2-disc set of new recordings of the songs.

Bob Johnson's health issues prevented him from playing live, shortly before the 2002 comeback tour, and he was replaced at the eleventh hour on guitar by Ken Nicol, formerly of the Albion Band. Nicol had been talking with Rick Kemp about forming a band, when Kemp invited him to play for the tour and this was to herald a significant return to form for the band.

=== Ken Nicol years ===
Steeleye Span, Spanfest, 2008

A revitalised lineup consisting of Prior, Kemp, Knight, Genockey and newcomer Ken Nicol released the album They Called Her Babylon early in 2004, to considerable acclaim. The band extensively toured the UK, Europe and Australia, and their relatively prolific output continued with the release of the Christmas album Winter later the same year, as the band ended a busy year of touring with a gala performance in London's Palladium theatre. In 2005, Steeleye Span were awarded the Good Tradition Award at the BBC Radio 2 Folk Awards, while the 2005 book, Electric Folk by Britta Sweers devotes much space to the band.

With a new sense of purpose and a stable line-up, the band carried out a UK tour in April and May 2006, followed by dates in Europe and an appearance at the 2006 Cropredy Festival, where they were the headline act on the opening night. The set started with "Bonny Black Hare" and finished with "All Around My Hat", with backing vocals from the Cropredy Crowd. The tour was supported by a live album and DVD of their 2004 tour.

In November 2006, Steeleye released their studio album Bloody Men. Their Autumn/Winter tour started on 24 November 2006 in Basingstoke and ran until just before Christmas. They headlined at their namesake festival, Spanfest 2007 at Kentwell Hall, Suffolk from 27 to 29 July 2007, and returned for Spanfest 2008. As Kentwell Hall declined to hold the festival again, it was held at Stanford Hall in Leicestershire. A UK tour took place between 17 April and 16 May 2008.

For their 40th anniversary tour, in 2009, Pete Zorn joined the line-up on bass, as Rick Kemp was unwell. Kemp and Zorn both toured with the band for the winter tour that year, with Zorn playing guitar, and Kemp announced that he would retire at the end of the tour – a decision he later reversed, as usual.

Live at a Distance, a live double CD and DVD set, was released in April 2009 by Park Records, and their new studio album entitled Cogs, Wheels & Lovers was released on 26 October 2009. Several tracks from this album featured in the sets of the autumn tour.

Founding member Tim Hart died on 24 December 2009, at his home in La Gomera on the Canary Islands, at the age of 61, after being diagnosed with inoperable lung cancer.

=== Now We Are Six Again / Wintersmith ===
In June 2010, Ken Nicol announced that he was leaving Steeleye and the band reassembled for a Spring 2011 tour, with Julian Littman joining the line-up as guitarist, replacing Nicol. Multi-instrumentalist Pete Zorn also continued to play with the band, making them a six-piece for the first time in many years.

In 2011, they released Now We Are Six again, a live double album based on their set at the time, which included full performances of all the songs on their 1974 Now We Are Six album.

In October 2013, the band released their 22nd studio album, Wintersmith, containing original songs based on the writings of Terry Pratchett. This was followed by a winter tour of the UK. This album marked a return to form and media attention as the album reached number 77 in the UK Albums Chart, had tracks played on BBC Radio 2 and led to various radio and TV interviews for Terry Pratchett and Maddy Prior as they promoted the album.

Following Pratchett's death, in March 2015, the band made an appearance at the memorial service for him, in April 2016, at Barbican Centre, London.

=== Peter Knight leaves / Dodgy Bastards album ===
Peter Knight left Steeleye Span at the end of 2013. He was replaced by Jessie May Smart. The band continued to tour regularly and recorded four new tracks for the 2014 'Deluxe' re-release of the Wintersmith album.

In the summer of 2015, they toured North America, with a reduced line up consisting of Prior, Littman, Smart, Genockey and, for the first time, Maddy's son, Alex Kemp, on bass, replacing his father, Rick. An autumn/winter tour of the UK followed with Rick Kemp back in the line-up, along with Andrew 'Spud' Sinclair, replacing Pete Zorn.

In April 2016, Pete Zorn was diagnosed with advanced lung and brain cancer. He died on 19 April.

Andrew Sinclair joined the band permanently in 2016 and the line up toured in October 2016 and announced the release of a new studio album, Dodgy Bastards, in November. The album is a mixture of original compositions, traditional songs and original tunes put to traditional lyrics.

=== Present day / 50th anniversary ===
After completing the 'Dodgy Bastards' tour, Rick Kemp retired and has been replaced by Roger Carey, on bass. For the November/December 2017 tour, the band was joined by multi-instrumentalist and ex-Bellowhead member Benji Kirkpatrick. Benji is son of former Steeleye Span member, John Kirkpatrick. This seven-piece line-up was the first in the band's history. 2019 was the band's 50th anniversary year and a new album was released to celebrate the anniversary: Est'd 1969. The band undertook two "50th Anniversary" tours in 2019, in Spring and Winter. The band played the 'Avalon Stage' at the Glastonbury Festival 2019, were a closing act at the Cornbury Music Festival 2019 and even made their debut in Russia at a folk festival called Chasti Sveta (Части света, Parts of the World), in Saint Petersburg. On 17 December, they appeared at the Barbican Theatre, in London, with special guests and previous band members Peter Knight, Martin Carthy and John Kirkpatrick.

For the November/December 2021 tour, the first post-Covid tour, Benji Kirkpatrick was absent due to 'personal reasons' and with Jessie May Smart still on maternity leave, Violeta Vicci joined the band, on violin. This same line up toured in May and October 2022. Benji Kirkpatrick left the band officially in February 2022 due to other commitments and has not been replaced. Former guitarist Bob Johnson died on 15 December 2023 at the age of 79.

Steeleye Span continued celebrating 50 years since the release of their classic Folk Rock albums by touring throughout November and December 2023, including a concert at the Cadogan Hall in London on 18 December 2023. 2024 was the 55th anniversary of the band and there were further tours in May and October, both supported by a new album The Green Man Collection and featuring new violinist Athena Octavia. It contains six newly recorded tracks in addition to songs from their last two studio albums. It features a new version of 'Hard Times of Old England' with a guest appearance of Francis Rossi from Status Quo on guitar and vocals.

In 2025, Steeleye Span toured twice in the UK and released the new studio album Conflict. They continue to tour and promote the new album during 2026 and have tours planned for 2027.

In 2026, Steeleye Span with Maddy Prior can be heard with their song "Twa Corbies" over the closing credits of Amazon Prime's "Young Sherlock"; Season 1, Episode 2.

== Examples of collaborations ==
Prior sang backing vocals on the title track of Jethro Tull's 1976 album Too Old To Rock and Roll, Too Young To Die, the song "Salamander's Rag-Time" from the same session and their 1978 single "A Stitch In Time". Later, members of Jethro Tull backed Prior on her album Woman in the Wings. Ray Fisher's rare 1972 album Bonny Birdy includes one track with the High Level Ranters, one with Steeleye Span, and one with Martin Carthy.

Until the 1990s, Steeleye often toured as part of a double bill, either supporting Status Quo, or featuring support from artists such as Rock Salt & Nails and The Rankin Family. When Steeleye Span supported Status Quo on tour, in 1996, the latter had just issued their version of "All Around My Hat" as a single. "The video was filmed at Christmas," Prior recalled. "We'd supported them, and I found myself down in the mosh pit. Francis saw me and told the audience, 'Oh look, there's a Maddy lookalike down there… Fuck me, it is Maddy!' I was hoyed over the barrier [to the stage], to join them for the encore. It was all very jolly." Status Quo's single is credited to "Status Quo with Maddy Prior from Steeleye Span" and reached number 47 in the charts.

== Members ==
Current members

- Maddy Prior – vocals, percussion, banjo (1969–1978, 1980–1997, 2002–present)
- Liam Genockey – drums, percussion (1989–1997, 2002–present)
- Julian Littman – guitars, mandolin, keyboards, vocals (2010–present)
- Jessie May Smart – violin, vocals (2014–present)
- Andrew "Spud" Sinclair – guitars, vocals (2015–present)
- Roger Carey – bass, vocals (2017–present)
- Violeta Vicci – violin (2019–present)
- Athena Octavia - violin, vocals (2023-present)

== Discography ==
=== Studio albums ===
- Hark! The Village Wait (1970)
- Please to See the King (1971)
- Ten Man Mop, or Mr. Reservoir Butler Rides Again (1971)
- Below the Salt (1972)
- Parcel of Rogues (1973)
- Now We Are Six (1974)
- Commoners Crown (1975)
- All Around My Hat (1975)
- Rocket Cottage (1976)
- Storm Force Ten (1977)
- Sails of Silver (1980)
- Back in Line (1986)
- Tempted and Tried (1989)
- Time (1996)
- Horkstow Grange (1998)
- Bedlam Born (2000)
- Present – The Very Best of Steeleye Span (2002)
- They Called Her Babylon (2004)
- Winter (2004)
- Bloody Men (2006)
- Cogs, Wheels & Lovers (2009)
- Wintersmith (2013)
- Dodgy Bastards (2016)
- Est'd 1969 (2019)
- Conflict (2025)

=== Unreleased material ===
In 1995, Steeleye recorded "The Golden Vanity" for the Time album, but the song did not appear on it. It was released on the anthology The Best of British Folk Rock. Similarly they recorded "General Taylor" for Ten Man Mop, but that album did not feature it. The song surfaced on the compilation album Individually and Collectively instead. It was also included on another compilation, The Lark in The Morning (2006), as well as re-issues of Ten Man Mop. "Bonny Moorhen" was recorded at the time of the Parcel of Rogues sessions. It is included on the compilation album Original Masters, and packaged as part of A Parcel of Steeleye Span. The song "Somewhere in London", recorded for Back in Line (1986), was released instead as the B-side of a single, but was added to that album's track listing when it was reissued in 1991. "Staring Robin", a song about a man described by Tim Harries as an "Elizabethan psycho", was recorded during the Bedlam Born (2000) sessions, but was left off the final album, for it was deemed by Park Records to be too disturbing.

The track "The Holly and the Ivy" was released as the B-side of the "Gaudete" single and did not appear on any album. It was later released on the Steeleye Span: A rare collection oddities compilation. Several Steeleye songs have never been recorded for a studio album and have only been made available in their live versions, including several tracks on Live at Last and Tonight's the night... Live.

== Sources ==
- Roberts, David (2006). British Hit Singles & Albums (19th ed.). London: Guinness World Records Limited. ISBN 1-904994-10-5.
- Van der Kiste, John (2019). All Around My Hat: The Steeleye Span Story. Stroud: Fonthill Media. ISBN 978-1781557457.
