= Liam Genockey =

Irish musician (born 1948)

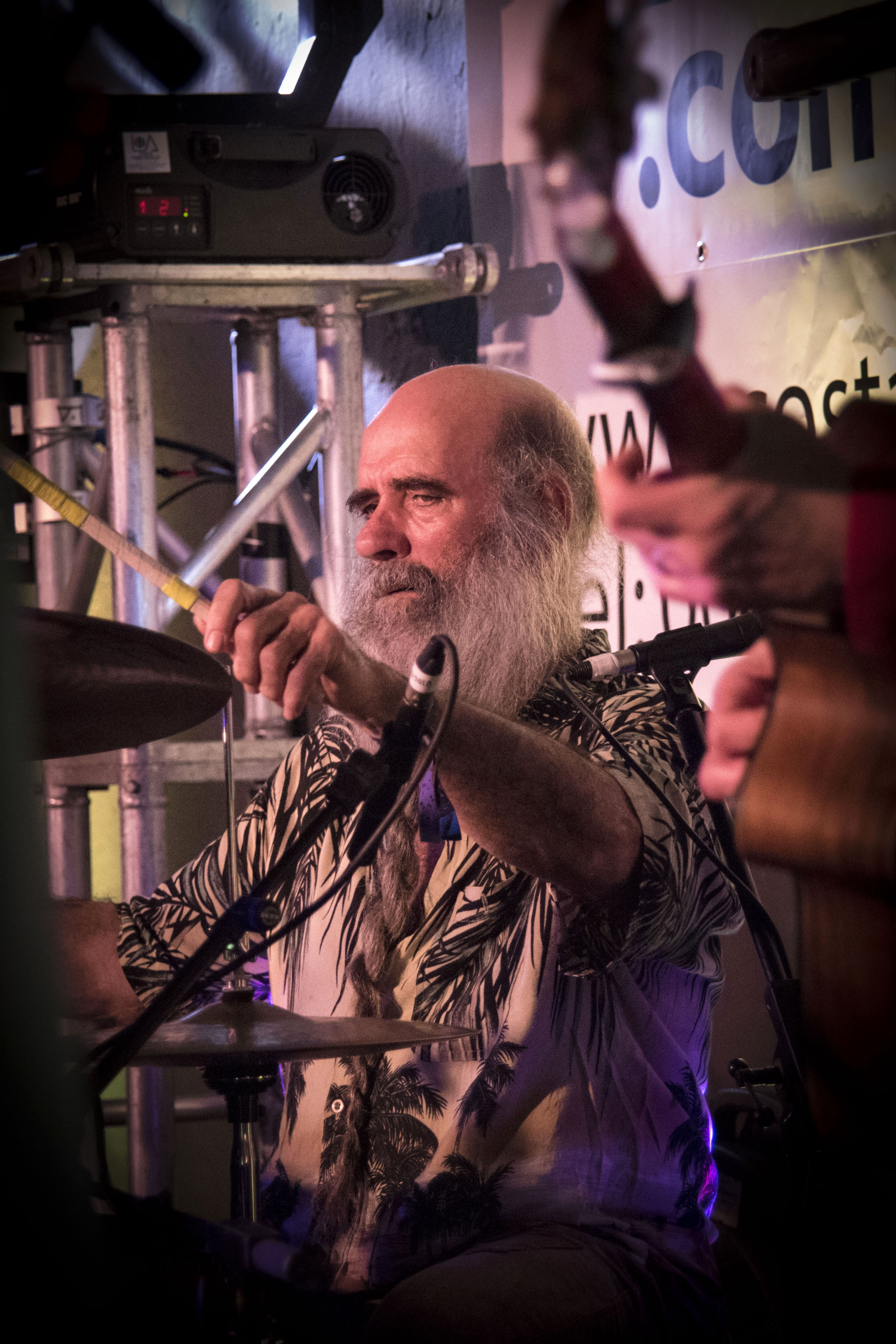
- Genockey 2015.

Background information
- Born: 12 August 1948 (age 78); Dublin, Ireland
- Genres: Afro-rock; progressive rock; free jazz; jazz fusion; folk rock; hard rock
- Instruments: Drums; percussion
- Years active: 1965–present
- Label: Various

Liam Genockey (born 12 August 1948) is an Irish musician, who is the drummer with British folk rock band Steeleye Span.

== Biography ==
Genockey was born in Dublin, Ireland. During the 1960s he lived in Plymouth, Devon, U.K, playing in local semi-pro groups and then, in the early 1970s, playing with Torbay-based rock band Adolphus Rebirth. He was one of the founding members of the early-1970s jazz-fusion and afro-prog band Zzebra, later moving on with fellow band-member John McCoy to join Gillan.

He then participated in Amalgam, formed in 1976 by Trevor Watts. Watts' work covers the spectrum of free jazz, electronic, jazz-rock, space jazz and folk-rock. Watts later founded 10-piece Moiré Music Ensemble which included Genockey again, along with Peter Knight, an early member of Steeleye Span.

Genockey joined Steeleye Span in 1989 and recorded two studio albums Tempted and Tried and Time, with them, as well as two live albums Tonight's the Night...Live and The Collection in Concert. Between 1997 and 2001, however, he was not in the band. He returned in 2001 to record Present – The Very Best of Steeleye Span, and has remained with the band since, though he also remains Paul Brady's drummer for both live and studio performances.

In January 2003, he was involved in the BBC Four broadcast of Free Will and Testament, a programme featuring performance footage of Robert Wyatt.

Liam is easily identified by his long, plaited beard. He currently lives in Hastings in East Sussex.

== Discography ==
With Julie Felix

- "Lightning" (1973)

With John Martyn

- Sunday's Child (1974)

With Zzebra (1974–1975)

- "Zzebra"/"Panic"
- "Take It Or Leave It"/"Lost World"

With Trevor Watts String Ensemble

- Cynosure (1978)

With Trevor Watts' Amalgam

- Another Time (1976)
- Closer To You (1979)

With Trevor Watts

- Over The Rainbow (1979)

With Mike Heron

- Mike Heron (1979)

With Gillan

- The Japanese Album (1978)
- Mr. Universe (1979) (features only one track with Genockey which is also on the above album)
- The Gillan Tapes Vol. 1 (1997) (features an unreleased track with Genockey, Because You Lied)

With Gerry Rafferty

- Night Owl (1979)
- Snakes and Ladders (1980)
- Sleepwalking (1982)
- Rest in Blue (2021)

With Kevin Ayers

- That's What You Get Babe (1980)

With Bonnie Tyler

- Goodbye to the Island (1981)

With Bashung

- Pizza (1981)

With Cornelius Cardew

- Cornelius Cardew Memorial Concert (1985)

With Linda Thompson

- One Clear Moment (1985)
- "Insult to Injury" and ""I'm A Dreamer" on Dreams Fly Away (1996)

With Trevor Watts' Moire Music

- With One Voice (1988)

With Lol Coxhill

- "Et Les Motards Mon Cher Watson" (1989) (on the anthology Bandes Originales Du Journal De Spirou)

With Buick 6

- Cypress Grove (1990)
- Juice Machine (1995)
- Live at the Telegraph (2007)

With Maddy Prior

- Memento: The Best of Maddy Prior (1995)

With Paul Brady

- Nobody Knows: The Best of Paul Brady (1999)
- Oh What a World (2001)
- The Paul Brady Songbook (2002)
- Hooba Dooba (2010)

With Steeleye Span

- Tonight's the Night...Live (1991)
- Time (1996)
- Present – The Very Best of Steeleye Span (2002)
- They Called Her Babylon (2004)
- Winter (2004)
- Folk Rock Pioneers Steeleye Span in Concert (2006)
- Bloody Men (2006)
- Cogs, Wheels and Lovers (2009)
- Wintersmith (2013) – UK No. 77
- Dodgy Bastards (2016)
- Est'd 1969 (2019)

With Annie Whitehead

- This is2... Rude (1994)
- Naked (1997)
- Home (2000)
- Gathering (2000)

With Robert Wyatt tribute album (various artists)

- Soupsongs Live (2002)

With Science Fiction anthology (various artists)

- Space 1999 (2004)

With Moke

- Superdrag (1999)

With Pete Kirtley and Paul McCartney

- Little Children (2000) (charity single)

With Elton Dean

- Moorsong (2001)

With Tom McRae

- All Maps Welcome (2005)

With Mandyleigh Storm

- Fire & Snow (2008)
