= Nigel Pegrum =

British musician (born 1949)

- Born: 22 January 1949 (age 77)
- Genres: Rock; folk
- Occupations: Musician; producer
- Instruments: Drums; percussion; flute; recorder; oboe
- Years active: 1960s–present
- Formerly of: Spice; Gnidrolog; Steeleye Span

Nigel John Pegrum (born 22 January 1949) is a music producer and former drummer. He has played with Spice, Gnidrolog, and Steeleye Span, and also co-founded the label Plant Life Records with Rick Kemp.

== Biography ==
Nigel Pegrum played drums with an early line-up of the Small Faces, then with Lee Grant And The Capitols before joining Spice, who subsequently changed their name to Uriah Heep and replaced him with a drummer who had a heavier style of playing. He then joined the art-rock/prog-rock band Gnidrolog. He joined Steeleye Span in June 1973, when the folk group finally decided to add a permanent drummer into the band. In Steeleye Span, Pegrum, in addition to playing the drums, also used his skills as a oboe and flute player.

In 1979, Pegrum joined up with Steeleye Span bassist Rick Kemp to create Plant Life Records. Pegrum was producer of over 30 albums on the label, which closed down in 1984. He worked as a freelance producer before emigrating to Australia with his family in 1991, where he works with Australian Sun Records. As of 2007, he was living in Cairns, Queensland.
