= Rick Kemp =

English folk-rock bass player, guitarist and vocalist (born 1941)

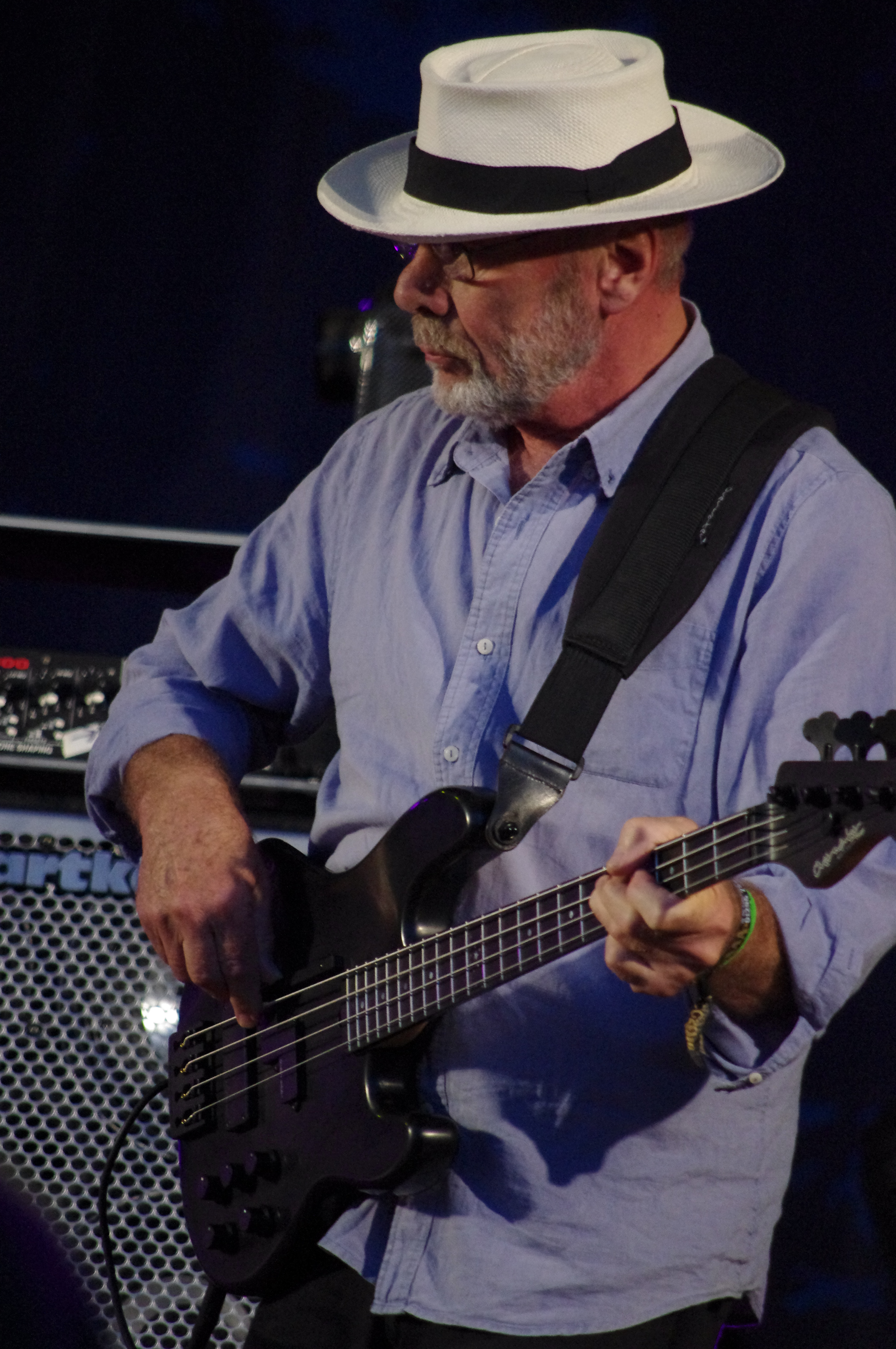
- Kemp in 2016

Background information
- Born: Frederick Stanley Kemp; 15 November 1941 (age 84)
- Origin: Little Hanford, Dorset
- Genres: Rock; blues; British folk rock
- Occupations: Musician, songwriter, record producer
- Instruments: Bass; guitar; vocals; drums
- Years active: 1960s–present
- Formerly of: King Crimson, Steeleye Span
- Spouse: Maddy Prior

Frederick Stanley 'Rick' Kemp (born 15 November 1941) is a retired English bass player, guitarist, songwriter, vocalist and record producer, best known for his work with the British folk rock band Steeleye Span.

== Biography ==
In 1971 Kemp auditioned for King Crimson, and got the gig shortly before the band recorded their album Islands. However, he turned down the opportunity to join them permanently, and reportedly departed the band after just a week (other sources say six weeks), with his role as bassist being filled by singer Boz Burrell.

Kemp joined Steeleye Span in 1972 alongside Bob Johnson, as a bassist and occasional drummer. He also played on solo albums by former Steeleye Span member Tim Hart in the 1970s and 1980s. In 1979 Kemp co-founded the record label Plant Life with Steeleye Span drummer Nigel Pegrum. The label was discontinued in 1984. Kemp left Steeleye Span in 1986 due a shoulder injury. In 1980, he held his first exhibition in Highgate, North London.

Kemp has played bass on a number of Maddy Prior records, and was a member of the Maddy Prior Band in the 1980s. The 1990 album Happy Families was officially credited to "Maddy Prior and Rick Kemp". He has released five solo albums: Escape (1996), Spies (1998), Codes (2004), Fanfare (2009) and Perfect Blue (2018). In 2018, he was working with former Steeleye Span member Ken Nicol and former 10cc drummer Paul Burgess for a few gigs.

From 1997 to around 2009, Kemp was the producer for the ceilidh dance band, Whapweasel. He also occasionally played guitar (as opposed to bass) with them. In 2007 again with Morter and Donahue he formed The Gathering (later Gathering Britannia) alongside Kristina Donahue, Ray Jackson and Clive Bunker. They released one album The Bridge Between (2011)

Kemp returned to Steeleye Span in 2000, before he retired from the band in 2016. He now does occasional gigs.

== Personal life ==
Frederick Stanley Kemp was born in Little Hanford, Dorset, UK. In 1986, he received a Bachelor's degree in Fine Arts.

He was the husband of Steeleye Span lead vocalist Maddy Prior, but they have since divorced. He is also the father of the musician Rose Kemp and hip-hop artist 'Kemp' whose first name is Alex.
