= Ray Cooper (singer-songwriter) =

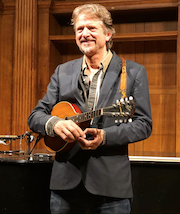
- Cooper performing at the South Hill Park Arts Centre, Bracknell, November 2018

Background information
- Born: Brian Raymond Cooper; 22 September 1954 (age 71); Redhill, England
- Genres: Folk; Folk rock; Punk; New wave
- Occupations: Musician, singer-songwriter
- Instruments: Vocals; Guitar; Bass Guitar; Cello; Mandolin; Harmonica; Piano; Mbira; Harmonium; Organ; Kantele; Percussion
- Years active: 1974–present
- Label: Westpark
- Formerly of: Oysterband
- Website: raycooper.org

Ray Cooper, also known as Chopper, is a British singer-songwriter and multi-instrumentalist living in Sweden.

== Initial musical collaborations and session work ==
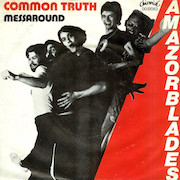
Single Common Truth by Amazorblades

Cooper's first professional band (1975–1978) was Amazorblades together with Rob Keyloch (engineer/producer/remixer) and Ben Mandelson. They were a punk/jazz outfit who toured extensively and recorded the single "Common Truth" in 1977 for Chiswick Records.

Between 1981 and 1982 Cooper played with the London-based band OK Jive, who signed to CBS in 1981. In 1983, he played bass guitar and bugle with The Mighty Clouds of Dust on their single release Flowers on the Wall / Champion (The Wonder Horse) / Mr.Custer.

In 1983, Cooper joined the World Music group 3 Mustaphas 3 where he played cello and sang under the name of Oussack Mustapha, alias The Nightingale of Szegerely. He recorded two albums with them for Globe Style Records. They also recorded a single with Agnes Bernelle produced by Phil Chevron and Elvis Costello. Cooper left the group in 1986. He performed in a reunion of six group members at the 30th Anniversary concert for fRoots magazine at the Roundhouse in London on 22 January 2010.

== Member of Oysterband ==
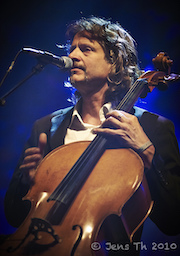
Ray Cooper performing with Oysterband in 2010

Cooper was a member of Oysterband between 1989 and 2013.

== Discography ==
=== With Amazorblades ===
- Common Truth (Single) 1977

=== With Yachts ===
- Without Radar (1980)

=== With OK Jive ===
- To You 1982 (Single produced by Rob Keyloch)
- On Route 1982 (Single produced by Joe Jackson)

=== The Mighty Clouds of Dust ===
- "Flowers on the Wall" / "Champion (The Wonder Horse)" / "Mr.Custer" 1983 (Single produced by Phil Chevron)

=== With 3 Mustaphas 3 ===
- Bam! Mustaphas Play Stereo, 1985
- From the Balkans to Your Heart: The Radio Years, 1986

=== With Oysterband ===
As Oyster Band

- Ride (1989)
- Freedom and Rain (1990) (collaboration with June Tabor)

As Oysterband

- Deserters (1992)
- Holy Bandits (1993)
- Trawler (1994)
- The Shouting End of Life (1995)
- Deep Dark Ocean (1997)
- Here I Stand (1999)
- Rise Above (2002)
- 25 (2003)
- Meet You There (2007)
- The Oxford Girl and Other Stories (2008)
- Ragged Kingdom (2011) (collaboration with June Tabor)

Live albums

- Little Rock to Leipzig (1990) (partially live)
- Alive and Shouting (1996)
- Alive and Acoustic (1998)
- 25th Anniversary Concert (2004) DVD
- Northern Light (2006)

Compilation albums

- The Rough Guide to World Music (1994) (contributing the track "When I'm Up I Can't Get Down")
- The Rough Guide to English Roots Music (1998) (contributing the track "Sail on By")
- Pearls from the Oysters (1998) (taking tracks from Step Outside, Wide Blue Yonder, Ride and Little Rock to Leipzig)
- This House Will Stand (The Best of Oysterband 1998–2015) (2016), double album containing alternate versions and demos

=== Solo ===
- Tales of Love War and Death by Hanging (2010) CD
- Palace of Tears (2014) CD
- Between The Golden Age & The Promised Land (2018) CD and LP
- Land of Heroes (2021) CD and LP

== Other published material ==
- Ray Cooper Songs (2015) songbook

== Awards ==
- 2003 Good Tradition Award, BBC Radio 2 Folk Awards (with Oysterband)
- 2005 Best Group, Oysterband Big Session, BBC Radio 2 Folk Awards
- 2009 Best group, Spiral Earth Award (with Oysterband)
- 2012 Best album, Spiral Earth Award (with June Tabor & Oysterband)
- 2012 Best Traditional Track, BBC Radio 2 Folk Awards (with June Tabor & Oysterband)
- 2012 Best Album, BBC Radio 2 Folk Awards (with June Tabor & Oysterband)
- 2012 Best Group, BBC Radio 2 Folk Awards (with June Tabor & Oysterband)
