= Dives and Lazarus (ballad) =

Traditional song

Dives and Lazarus is a traditional English folk song listed as Child ballad 56 and number 477 in the Roud Folk Song Index. It is considered a Christmas carol and based on the parable of the rich man and Lazarus (also called "Dives and Lazarus" and found in Luke 16:19–16:31). The song traditionally used a variety of tunes, but one particular tune, published by Lucy Broadwood in 1893 and used in other traditional songs, inspired many notable works and appeared in several pieces composed by Ralph Vaughan Williams.

== History ==
Francis James Child collected two variants in The English and Scottish Popular Ballads. Lucy Broadwood noted in 1893 that the song had a strong presence in Worcestershire and was sung in Warwickshire into the early nineteenth century, suggesting that it had become virtually extinct by the turn of the nineteenth century. Cecil Sharp nevertheless collected a handful of versions in the 1910s and 20s in Herefordshire and Shropshire, using different tunes. The only known authentic audio recording of the song is Peter Kennedy's 1952 recording of Emily Bishop of Bromsberrow Heath, Gloucestershire, which can be heard online via the British Library Sound Archive. Textual references suggest that the ballad, in some form, may date back at least to the 1550s, though the form known today seems to date from the early 19th century.

== Synopsis ==
The rich man Dives or Diverus makes a feast. The poor man Lazarus comes to Dives' door and repeatedly begs 'brother Dives' to give him something to eat and drink. Dives answers that he is not the brother of Lazarus, denies Lazarus food and drink, and sends his servants to whip him and his dogs to bite him. However, the servants are unable to whip Lazarus, and the dogs "lick his sores away" instead of biting him.

As both men die, angels carry Lazarus to heaven, and serpents drag Dives to hell. In one version Dives asks Lazarus (who is apparently unable to help him) for a drop of water, and complains about his eternal punishment.

As it fell out upon a day,
Rich Dives he made a feast,
And he invited all his friends,
And gentry of the best.

Then Lazarus laid him down and down,
And down at Dives' door:
"Some meat, some drink, brother Dives,
Bestow upon the poor."

The story contains some miraculous elements, and has its emphasis slightly changed from the more traditionally Jewish to a more popularly Western Christian view of the afterlife.

As in other popular renderings of the parable, Dives (Latin for rich or splendid) was considered as a proper name, and the name even was changed to Diverus in variant B.

== Tune ==
The beginning few bars of the ballad

In Popular Music of the Olden Time (1855), William Chappell gives the following information about the melody:

This is the tune of many songs. If the reader should meet any half-a-dozen men perambulating the streets of London together, and singing, the probabilities are great that they sing to this tune. Sometimes the men are dressed like sailors; at other times they look like workmen out of employment. I recollect hearing the tune at Kilburn, full forty years ago [c. 1815], and have, with tolerable annual regularity, ever since. I regret never having stopped to hear the words.

Traditional folk songs which have been known to use the "Dives and Lazarus" tune include the English songs "The Two Brothers", "The Unquiet Grave" (Child 78), "The Thresher" (Roud 19) and "The Murder of Maria Marten" (Roud 215), as well as a Welsh song from Gwynedd called "Baledwyr Nefyn" and the Irish ballad "Star of the County Down."

=== Association with "Dives and Lazarus" ===
Lucy Broadwood wrote that the musicologist Alfred James Hipkins had known the tune for years and called it "Lazarus", but did not know the lyrics. An elderly woman in Westminster, London, in 1892 reportedly recognised the tune Hipkins knew as belonging to a song about the Lazarus parable. Broadwood matched a typical version of the lyrics to "Dives and Lazarus" with this tune attested by Hipkins and the lady from Westminster, stating that "they suit it so well that there is a great probability of their having at one time been associated together". Broadwood then published the Hipkins tune with those lyrics in English Country Songs (1893) under the name "Lazarus". Her notes and transcription of the tune can be seen on the Vaughan Williams Memorial Library. Peter Kennedy's 1952 recording of Emily Bishop of Bromsberrow Heath, Gloucestershire (available via the British Library Sound Archive) uses a similar text and tune, suggesting that Broadwood was correct in matching Afred Hipkins' tune with the old text.

=== Ralph Vaughan Williams ===
Ralph Vaughan Williams first used the tune in his arrangement of the hymn tune "Kingsfold" (1906), to which two sets of words are commonly sung: "O sing a song of Bethlehem", and "I heard the voice of Jesus". The first verse of the ballad, "As it fell out upon a day", is sung in Vaughan Williams's score for The Dim Little Island. Vaughan Williams claimed to have found the tune himself in the village of Kingsfold, near Horsham in West Sussex.

He quoted the tune in his popular English Folk Song Suite (1923) and later used it as the basis of his Five Variants of Dives and Lazarus (1939).

=== Modern uses ===
The tune is used in numerous other non-traditional musical works in various regions:

The tune was famously used in the Irish song "Star of the County Down", probably written in the early twentieth century, with its melody taken from a version of the Irish folk song "My Love Nell". It was also used for the song "Crooked Jack" written by Dominic Behan, the American song "The Fighting 69th", and the song "The Year Turns Round Again" featured in War Horse, with words by John Tams. Loreena McKennitt set The Seven Joys of Mary to the tune on her album A Midwinter Night's Dream.

The tune has been used various times for different hymns, including the Quaker hymn "When Jesus Walked Upon This Earth" in the Quaker songbook Worship in Song: A Friends Hymnal, the Lutheran hymn "Come, Join the Dance of Trinity", and the Church of Jesus Christ of Latter-Day Saints hymn "If You Could Hie to Kolob" (hymn number 284) written by the early member of The Church of Jesus Christ of Latter-Day Saints, W. W. Phelps. The tune was also used for the song "My God, I Love You", by Christian pop group, Glad in their 1996 album The A Cappella Project III.

== Recordings ==
- The Young Tradition (sung by Royston Wood) on the album The Young Tradition (1965)
- June Tabor on her collaboration with Oysterband, Freedom and Rain (1990)
- Martin Simpson on the album The Bramble Briar (2001) and with Wu Man on the album Music For The Motherless Child (1996)
- The Electrics on their album Reel, Folk'n'Rock'n'Roll (2001)
- Nic Jones on the live albums Unearthed (2001) and Game Set Match (2006)
- Nick Hart on the album Nick Hart Sings 10 English Folk Songs (2022), including video depicting a feast

== Renderings ==
Variant A was published as item 109 in "Dives and Lazarus". The Oxford Book of Ballads, 1910. Bartleby.
