= Courchesne =

Surname list

Courchesne is the surname of the following people

- Eric Courchesne, American researcher in autism
- Luc Courchesne (born in 1952), Canadian artist and academic
- Michelle Courchesne (born in 1953), Canadian politician in Quebec

== See also ==
- Courchene
