= Down by Blackwaterside =

Traditional folk songs

"Down by Blackwaterside" (also known as "Blackwaterside", "Blackwater Side" and "Black Waterside"; see Roud 312, Laws O1 and Roud 564, Laws P18, Henry H811) is a traditional folk song, provenance and author unknown, although it is likely to have originated near the River Blackwater, Northern Ireland. Peter Kennedy suggests that the lyrics originated in England, later picking up the best known tune in Ireland. Versions with a different tune have been collected in the English West Country. There is a Blackwater River in South East England.

== Synopsis ==
The song tells the story of a woman who has her heart broken "down by Blackwaterside" when a suitor breaks his promise of marriage, which he made to trick her into having sex with him. Her suitor mocks her for believing that he would marry her and tells her to go back to her father. He tells her she has only herself to blame for having sex before marriage. She realises he will never return and berates herself for believing his lies.

== Roud 564 Variant ==
The Roud 564 variant of the song was popularised by a BBC Archive recording of an Irish Traveller, Mary Doran, recorded by Peter Kennedy and Sean O'Boyle on either 24 July or 1 August 1952. During the same recording sessions her husband Paddy Doran and Winnie Ryan also performed versions of the song.

Mary Doran's version (or possibly Winnie Ryan's—see below) was popularised, either directly (from the Kennedy recording) or via the intermediary services of the singer A. L. Lloyd, by the singer Isla Cameron, who recorded a version in 1962. The younger singer Anne Briggs has also been stated to have obtained the song via Lloyd, although in the case of Briggs' own, 1971 recorded version (with notes by Lloyd) her version is merely stated to be "the one popularised from a BBC Archive recording of an Irish traveller, Mary Doran" and from opinions expressed elsewhere it seems most likely that she learned it from Cameron's recording or public performances (in the same discussion it is suggested that the version from Winnie Ryan of Belfast, not Mary Doran, was the likely source of the variant as subsequently popularised in the revival, and that Lloyd made an error in his liner note). Briggs in turn taught it to singer/guitarist Bert Jansch. Early in 1965, Briggs and Jansch were performing regularly together in folk clubs and spent most of the daytime at a friend's flat, collaborating on new songs and the development of complex guitar accompaniments for traditional songs. Briggs has noted that "Everybody up to that point was accompanying traditional songs in a very... three-chord way.... It was why I always sang unaccompanied... but seeing Bert's freedom from chords, I suddenly realised—this chord stuff, you don't need it". "Blackwaterside" was one of the first songs that they worked on. Briggs belatedly recorded the song on her eponymous 1971 album (by which time she was playing a guitar accompaniment), though Jansch had recorded it (as "Blackwaterside") in 1966 on his album Jack Orion. It is not known when Jansch started singing the song in the folk clubs, but certainly before the recording of Jack Orion. The story of Jansch learning the tune from Briggs is retold in Ralph McTell's "A Kiss in the Rain."

== Recordings ==
The Irish traditional singer Paddy Tunney recorded versions of both songs. A well as the traditional singers, the two songs have been covered by numerous artists including Isla Cameron, Anne Briggs, Bert Jansch, Sandy Denny, Show of Hands, Oysterband, the Clancy Brothers and Tommy Makem, particularly during the UK's second folk music revival in the 1960s.

A number of the artists in the recordings listed below have issued the same version on multiple albums. Only the first one of each version appears below.

Year	Album	Artist	Variant	Notes
1962	The Jupiter Book of Ballads: Spoken and Sung by Isla Cameron, Jill Balcon, Pauline Letts, John Laurie, etc.	Isla Cameron	Roud 564	
1966	The Irish Edge	Paddy Tunney	Roud 564	named "Blackwater Side"
1966	Jack Orion	Bert Jansch	Roud 564	
1967	In Concert	The Clancy Brothers and Tommy Makem		named "Blackwater's Side"
1969	Led Zeppelin	Led Zeppelin	Roud 564	Instrumental, named "Black Mountain Side"
1971	Anne Briggs	Anne Briggs	Roud 564	
1971	The North Star Grassman and the Ravens	Sandy Denny		
1975	Jean Redpath	Jean Redpath		
1977	A Maid in Bedlam	John Renbourn Group		Named "Black Waterside"
1991	Home Fire	Ron Kavana		
1996	Blackwater	Altan		
1998	Folk Music	Show of Hands		Combined with "The Train"
1998	The Voice of the People Vol. 10	Paddy Tunney	Roud 312	Recorded in 1965 as "Blackwaterside"
1998	A Folk Song a Day 1: July 2010	Jon Boden		
2002	Rise Above	Oysterband		
2011	Black Water Side	Cara Luft		
2017	Wanderer	Cara Dillon	Henry H811	Recorded in 2017
2018	Hand Rolled Halo	The Eastern Swell	Roud 564	Recorded in 2018
2019	Bonny Light Horseman	Bonny Light Horseman		Recorded as "Blackwaterside"
2023	"Blackwaterside" (single)	Joshua Lee Turner		Recorded as "Blackwaterside"

== Comparisons with "Black Mountain Side" ==
Led Zeppelin's song "Black Mountain Side" is similar sounding to "Blackwaterside". Singer-songwriter Al Stewart claims to have taught the folk song to Zeppelin's guitarist Jimmy Page. Stewart, who had arrived in London in early 1965, followed Jansch's gigs closely and learnt what he thought was Jansch's version of "Blackwaterside". However, he mistakenly believed that Jansch was using the DADGAD tuning on his guitar, whereas he was in fact using 'drop-D' tuning. At the time, Stewart was recording his own debut album and had engaged Page as a session musician. According to Stewart's account, it was he who taught Page "Blackwaterside" in DADGAD during a tea-break. This may even have been Page's first acquaintance with DADGAD.

In spite of this difference, Jansch's record company sought legal advice in consultation with two eminent musicologists and John Mummery QC, a copyright barrister in the United Kingdom, following the release of the Led Zeppelin album, on which "Black Mountain Side" appears. Ultimately, however, no legal action was ever taken against Led Zeppelin, although it was likely that Page had borrowed from Jansch's piece, because it could not be proved that the recording in itself constituted Jansch's own copyright, as the basic melody was traditional. Nevertheless, Jansch said that Page "ripped me off, didn't he? Or let's just say he learned from me."
