= Jonathan Mitchell (writer) =

American writer and blogger

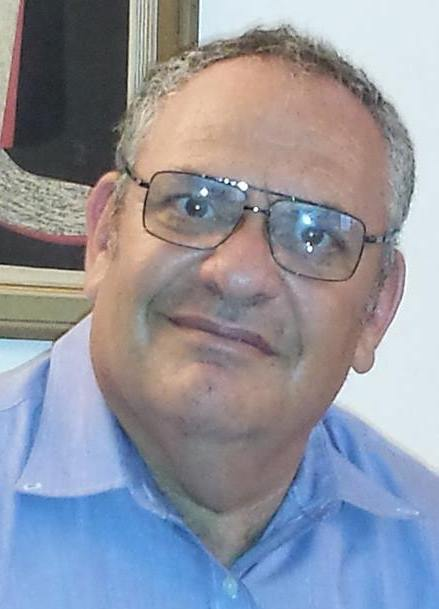
- Mitchell in 2015
- Born: September 7, 1955 (age 71); Los Angeles, California, US
- Education: Psychology (BS)
- Alma mater: UCLA
- Relatives: Melanie Mitchell (sister)
- Writing career
- Years active: 2003-present (writer)
- Website: jonathans-stories.com

Jonathan Mitchell (born September 7, 1955) is an American author and autistic blogger who writes about autism including the neuroscience of the disorder and neurodiversity movement. His novel The Mu Rhythm Bluff is about a 49-year-old autistic man who undergoes transcranial magnetic stimulation.

== Biography ==
Mitchell was born in 1955 and at the age of 12, he was diagnosed with autism. He attended psychoanalytic therapy as a child. He also attended mainstream and special education schools facing expulsion and being bullied. Mitchell has been employed in data entry jobs, but was fired many times for his behavior, which he implicitly blames on his autism. After retiring at 51 years old, he attempted to get SSDI but was not successful. He lives in Los Angeles and is supported by his parents.

Mitchell has volunteered in scientific research for autism and has served as an experimental subject to Eric Courchesne.

Mitchell claims that having autism has prevented him from having a girlfriend or making a living.

== Advocacy ==
Mitchell has been described by Newsweek as an extremely controversial voice in the autism blogosphere for wanting a cure and discussing the need to consider the longer-term effects of autism. Mitchell has been criticized by other autism/autistic bloggers for his pro-cure stance. In 2015, during a Newsweek profiling, the journalist was urged by Mitchell's critics to not write about him. In a 2015 commentary in the Huffington Post, immunologist and autism community supporter Neil Greenspan mentioned that Mitchell would be very unlikely to demand that others seek autism treatment, should it become widely available.

Responding to Mitchell's commentary on neurodiversity in the magazine The Spectator, Nick Cohen agreed with his statement that many neurodiversity advocates can hold down careers and provide for families, and cannot speak on behalf of those that are more severely impacted, yet said nothing about Mitchell's own attempt to do so. Jonathan Rose, a history professor at Drew University, agreed with this commentary (that neurodiversity is over-represented in the media and at the Interagency Autism Coordinating Committee), since profoundly autistic individuals have difficulty advocating for themselves. By contrast, author Jessie Hewitson described many of the difficulties associated with autism as challenges, but that his autism is "not an affliction".

== Interests ==
Mitchell has written the novel The Mu Rhythm Bluff, which is about a 49-year-old man who undergoes transcranial magnetic stimulation to treat his autism. Regarding the novel, neurobiology professor Manuel Casanova wrote that he was impressed with Mitchell's scientific knowledge. Mitchell has been working on another novel titled The School of Hard Knocks, which is about an abusive special education school. He has also written twenty-five short stories. Mitchell's writing has been compared by the novelist Lawrence Osborne to the work of David Miedzianik, a UK-based autistic poet and writer.

Mitchell served as a subject for an MRI study conducted by autism researcher Eric Courchesne. He has been exchanging emails with neurologist Marco Iacoboni with questions about mirror neurons since 2010. Mitchell has also followed Casanova's work, which focuses on abnormalities within the brain's minicolumns.
