= The Oxford Girl and Other Stories =

Compilation album by Oysterband
- Released: 2008
- Genre: British folk rock

Oysterband chronology
Meet You There (2007)	The Oxford Girl and Other Stories (2008)	Ragged Kingdom (2011)

The Oxford Girl and Other Stories is a 2008 acoustic compilation album by British folk rock band Oysterband.

== Track listing ==
1. The Early Days of a Better Nation (Ian Telfer / John Jones) 4'08"
2. When I'm Up I Can't Get Down (Ian Telfer / Alan Prosser / John Jones) 3'37"
3. By Northern Light (Ian Telfer / John Jones / Alan Prosser / Chopper) 4'23"
4. Blood-Red Roses (Alan Prosser / Ian Telfer) 2'36"
5. The Soul's Electric (Chopper / John Jones / Lee Partis / Alan Prosser / Ian Telfer) 2'47"
6. The Oxford Girl (John Jones / Ian Telfer) 4'05"
7. Little Brother (John Jones / Alan Prosser / Ian Telfer) 3'30"
8. What Wondrous Love Is This? (Trad Arr The Sacred Harp Publishing Co.) 2'08"
9. Angels Of The River (John Jones / Ian Telfer) 4'29"
10. After Rain (John Jones / Alan Prosser / Ian Telfer / Strings Intro – Alan Prosser) 4'08"
11. Shouting About Jerusalem (Chopper / John Jones / Lee Partis / Alan Prosser / Ian Telfer) 3'12"
12. The Lakes of Cool Flynn (Trad Arr John Jones / Alan Prosser / Chopper) 3'36"
13. The False Knight On The Road (Trad Arr John Jones / Alan Prosser / Chopper) 3'59"
14. Put Out The Lights (Ian Telfer / Alan Prosser) 5'06"
