= Step Outside =

Studio album by The Oyster Band
- Released: 1986
- Recorded: 1986
- Genre: British folk rock
- Length: 40:36
- Label: Cooking Vinyl
- Producer: Clive Gregson

The Oyster Band chronology
Liberty Hall (1985)	Step Outside (1986)	Wide Blue Yonder (1987)

Step Outside is a 1986 album by British folk rock band The Oyster Band. The album was the first release of Cooking Vinyl records. The album was chosen as one of the 50 best of the year in Q Magazine.

== Track listing ==
1. "Hal-an-Tow" (Trad.) - 4:22
2. "Flatlands" (Ian Telfer) - 5:42
3. "Another Quiet Night in England" (John L. Jones, Telfer) - 4:21
4. "Ashes to Ashes" (Telfer, Ian Kearney, Alan Prosser) - 3:43
5. "Molly Bond" (Trad.) - 4:29
6. "Bully in the Alley" (Telfer, Jones) - 4:57
7. "The Day that the Ship Goes Down" (Telfer, Jones) - 4:28
8. "Gaol Song" (Trad.) - 3:40
9. "The Old Dance" (Telfer) - 4:21
10. "Bold Riley" (Trad.) - 4:16
