= David Miedzianik =

British writer

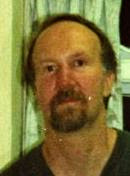
- Miedzianik in 1996
- Born: David Christopher Miedzianik; 24 July 1956 (age 70); Rotherham, West Riding of Yorkshire, England
- Citizenship: United Kingdom
- Writing career
- Language: English
- Years active: 1970s–2004
- Notable work: My Autobiography

David Christopher Miedzianik (/ˈmɛdʒənɪk/, /mɪˈdʒæn-/, born 24 July 1956) is an English autistic poet and writer. His writings portray the more difficult aspects of autism. Additionally, most of his poems focus on social difficulties that he experiences. He is unemployed, but writes about how he wants to work and find love. Miedzianik writes about specific examples pertaining to those desires. Miedzianik's works have been extensively analyzed by noted autism researchers, who describe his writing as thoughtful, sophisticated, and displaying an unusually strong awareness of his social difficulties.

== History ==
David Christopher Miedzianik was born on 24 July 1956 to a Russian father and English mother. He writes about his paternal grandfather having known Grigori Rasputin. His parents separated when Miedzianik was three years old - his father relocated to London and lived there for the next ten years until his death in 1969 due to a diabetic coma. In 1970, he was diagnosed with autism after being admitted to Middlewood Hospital, but did not start attending special education classes until two years later. In the late 1970s, he began writing for Jigsaw, the official magazine of Middlewood Hospital. This, he states, influenced him to write poetry, as did his wanting to become a musician when he was a teenager. During the late 1970s and early 1980s, Miedzianik often attended concerts by local Sheffield groups and befriended several members of those groups.

In 1985, he wrote his autobiography, My Autobiography, which was published in December 1986 through the University of Nottingham. Professor Elizabeth Newson in the foreword claimed that his autobiography was the second autism autobiography of all time to be published, with Emergence: Labeled Autistic by Temple Grandin being the first one. Because he cannot hold down a career, he has stated in his autobiography that "Living is more or less a constant bore". A long-form poem, I Hope Some Lass Will Want Me After Reading All This, followed in 1987. He also started publishing his poems in several autism newsletters in the UK and US. In 1990, an excerpt of his long-form poem was published in an issue of The Advocate, the Autism Society of America's newsletter.

By the early 1990s, he had gotten local media attention for his writings, leading to an interview on Against All Odds, a local Sheffield TV programme, and a US release of his autobiography, including the long-form poem as an appendix. He would release two poetry anthologies, Taking the Load off My Mind (1993) and Now All I've Got Left is Myself (1997). 1997 also saw him contributing to Sarah Croskin's paper Autism: a life history approach. He continued publishing poetry to the Internet until roughly 2004.

== Analysis ==
Miedzianik's works have been extensively analyzed by noted autism researchers, who describe his writing as thoughtful, sophisticated, and displaying an unusually strong awareness of his social difficulties. Miedzianik has been described as roaming from subject to subject, but usually introduces material to the reader with a proper explanation. Other topics he writes about besides his loneliness and datelessness are his unusual behavior. Francesca Happé has described Miedzianik's writing as the "least autistic" from the authors that he was compared to including Temple Grandin, as he demonstrated the greatest awareness of his limitations and how others perceived him. Peter Hobson has described him as one of the most thoughtful and linguistically gifted autistic writers. Hobson has described Miedzianik's writings about his solitude as repetitive and disjointed, and also notes his awareness of his own solitude. Uta Frith has described him as articulate and literate, and notes his use of highly sophisticated language.

Professor Newson of the University of Nottingham noted that despite his difficulty with holding down a job, he manages to be involved in a wide variety of activities. Newson also claimed that his writing ability was so strong, only minor edits were needed for My Autobiography.

He was noted for portraying autism through an autistic person's perspective. In his poem "The Mega-Chip Men" from 1997, he mocks the idea that autistics cannot think for themselves, comparing them to computers that can think independently. He also implies that they can work relentlessly. In another poem "Miracles Don't Happen", he talks about how he claims that his own country won't accept him.

Miedzianik has been described as having a negative self-image and reduced self-esteem, based on his upbringing. He claimed that his friend Nigel was more well-adjusted than him, and he went to a special hospital school for a while and was given several medications. The novelist Lawrence Osborne in his book American Normal: The Hidden World of Asperger Syndrome compared Miedzianik to the autistic author Jonathan Mitchell in the respect that his writings portray the more difficult aspects of autism.

== Works dedicated to Miedzianik ==
The British songwriter Ray Hearne once wrote a song about Miedzianik's life in 1989, titled "Song for David". Additionally, the British metal band Solitary wrote a song named "Twisted" in 1998, which was released on their album Nothing Changes and dedicated to Miedzianik. The band stated "'Twisted' was written for and inspired by David Miedzianik by his and others continued fight against autism." Jez Lowe and The Bad Pennies wrote a song about his experiences titled "A Lass to Want Me". "Song for David" and "A Lass to Want Me" were both featured on A Season of Changes: The Autistic Awareness Album, a music album about autistic experiences released in 1997 to fundraise for autism services in Doncaster.

Oysterband also wrote a song, "Little Brother", in response to ads Miedzianik would leave in magazines asking for songs, based on the severely-autistic teenage son of an acquaintance of the band. The track was released on their 1997 album Deep Dark Ocean.

== Autobiography ==
My Autobiography
- Author: David Miedzianik
- Language: English
- Genre: Autobiographical novel
- Publisher: University of Nottingham Childhood Developmental Research Unit
- Publication date: December 1986
- Publication place: United Kingdom
- Pages: 120
- OCLC: 17774417

My Autobiography is the debut and only prose novel by David Miedzianik. Published in December 1986 by the University of Nottingham, the book chronicles Miedzianik's life from birth until 1985, when the book was written.

According to Professor Elizabeth Newson, who wrote the foreword, Miedzianik's writing ability was so strong that only minor edits were required before publication. She also attributed the novel's genesis to a study on autistic people conducted in 1978 by the university, for which Miedzianik's mother was interviewed, and a follow-up in which Miedzianik himself was interviewed. Peter Hobson has described his writing style in this novel as thoughtful and linguistically gifted. He has described Miedzianik's writings about his solitude as repetitive and disjointed, and also notes his awareness of solitude. Francesca Happé has described Miedzianik's autobiography as possessing the "least autistic" writing from the authors that he was compared to including Temple Grandin, as he demonstrated the greatest awareness in his novel of his limitations and how others perceived him.

== Bibliography ==
- My Autobiography (1986, Nottingham University Childhood Developmental Unit; US release 1993, Autism Society of North Carolina)
- I Hope Some Lass Will Want Me After Reading All This (1987, Nottingham University Childhood Developmental Unit)
- Taking the Load off My Mind (1993, Nottingham University Childhood Developmental Unit)
- Now All I've Got Left is Myself (1997, Early Years Diagnostic Centre, Ravenshead)
- Autism: a life history approach (1997, Journal of Learning Disabilities for Nursing, Health and Social Care; with Sarah Croskin)
