= The Shouting End of Life =

Studio album by Oysterband
- Released: 1995
- Recorded: 1995
- Genre: British folk rock, folk punk
- Length: 42:12
- Label: Cooking Vinyl
- Producer: Pat Collier

Oysterband chronology
Holy Bandits (1993)	The Shouting End of Life (1995)	Deep Dark Ocean (1997)

The Shouting End of Life is an album by the British folk rock group Oysterband, released in 1995. The album was vehemently political, and showed a much harder, punkier side than previous albums.

The album peaked at No. 96 on the UK Albums Chart.

== Critical reception ==
Professional ratings
Review scores
Source	Rating
AllMusic	4/5 stars
Alternative Press	4/5 stars
Rock Hard	9.0/10

The Toronto Star lamented "the passing of the more subtle side of Oysterband, which allowed fiddle, winds and cello and youthful enthusiasm to color new light into the traditional."

AllMusic wrote that "though British folk has been a major influence on the Oyster Band, much of this CD finds them favoring a Celtic-influenced exuberance."

== Track listing ==
1. "We'll be There" (Telfer, Jones, Prosser) - 3:22
2. "Blood-Red Roses" (Telfer, Prosser) - 4:06
3. "Jam Tomorrow" (Telfer, Jones, Prosser) - 4:10
4. "By Northern Light" (Telfer, Jones, Prosser, Chopper) - 3:47
5. "The Shouting End of Life" (Telfer, Jones, Prosser) - 3:26
6. "Long Dark Street" (Telfer, Jones, Prosser) - 3:48
7. "Our Lady of the Bottles" (Telfer, Jones, Prosser) - 3:07
8. "Everywhere I Go" (Telfer, Jones, Prosser) - 3:48
9. "Put Out the Lights" (Telfer, Prosser) - 3:34
10. "Voices" (Telfer, Jones, Prosser, Chopper) - 4:42
11. "Don't Slit Your Wrists for Me" (Telfer, Jones, Prosser) - 3:46
12. "The World Turned Upside Down" (Leon Rosselson) - 3:03
