= Wide Blue Yonder =

Wide Blue Yonder may refer to:

- Wide Blue Yonder (album), a 1987 album by Oysterband
- Wide Blue Yonder (film), a 2010 Norwegian-British black comedy drama film
