= Ray Cooper (disambiguation) =

Ray Cooper is an English musician.

Ray Cooper may also refer to:

- Ray Cooper (fighter)
- Ray Cooper (singer-songwriter)
- Ray Cooper III, American mixed martial artist
