= Meet You There =

Meet You There may refer to:

- "Meet You There" (song), a song by Busted from A Present for Everyone
- Meet You There (album), a 2007 album by Oysterband
- "Meet You There", a song by Simple Plan from No Pads, No Helmets...Just Balls
- "Meet You There", a song by 5 Seconds of Summer from Youngblood
