= Middlewood Hospital =

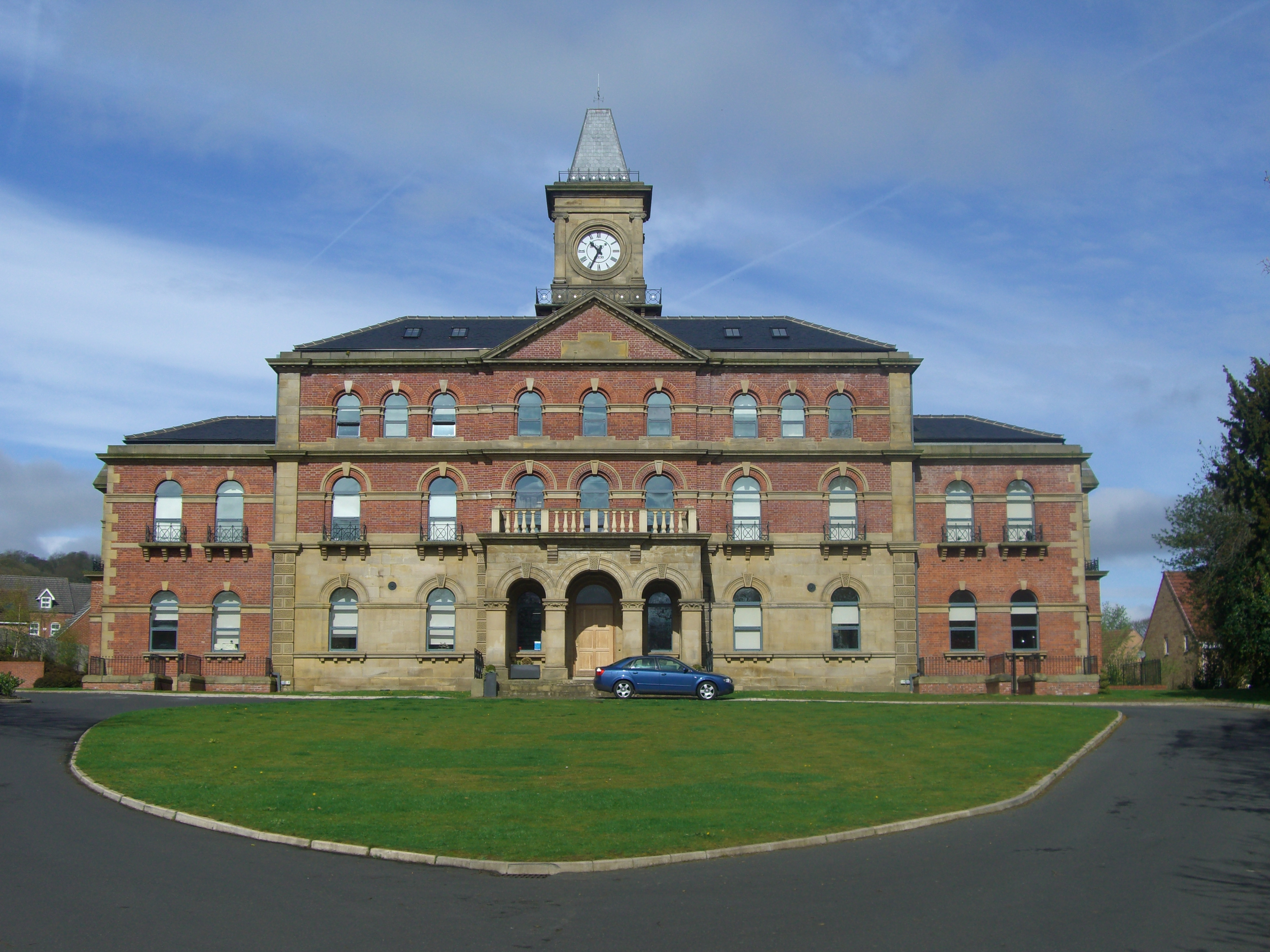
- The main admin building for the hospital, known as the clock tower has been converted into 38 apartments.

- Location in South Yorkshire

Geography
- Location: Middlewood, South Yorkshire, England
- Coordinates: 53.418305°N 1.520287°W

Organisation
- Care system: NHS
- Type: Mental health

History
- Founded: 1872
- Closed: 1996

Links
- Lists: Hospitals in England

Middlewood Hospital is a former psychiatric hospital situated between the suburbs of Middlewood and Wadsley in the City of Sheffield, South Yorkshire, England. It was also known as the South Yorkshire Asylum (1872–1888), the West Riding Asylum, Wadsley (1889–1929) and Wadsley Mental Hospital (1930–1948). It was one of four hospitals that made up The West Riding General Asylums Committee. It closed in 1996 and is now a private housing development called Wadsley Park Village.

== History ==
=== Construction and expansion ===
In 1866 the West Riding County Asylum at Wakefield had 1,130 beds and was suffering from overcrowding, having trebled in size in the previous 25 years. It was decided by the Hospital Committee to assign a subcommittee to find a suitable site for a second asylum. The site committee which was chaired by Lord Wharncliffe (later to become the Earl of Wharncliffe) reported that the only suitable site was at Wadsley Park, 3.5 miles north west of the centre of Sheffield, this was an area of open farmland which had previously been part of the Wharncliffe Estate.

Work on levelling the land on the sloping site took place in 1868 and building commenced on the construction of the Sheffield Asylum in the summer of 1869 with the architectural plans being mainly drawn up by Bernard Hartley, the West Riding surveyor from 1868 to 1884. The initial plan was for the hospital to have 400 beds, this was quickly upgraded to 630 by the Home Secretary and then again to 750 in the final plans. The asylum was declared open on 21 August 1872 with the official opening ceremony taking place on 7 September of that year. The construction of the hospital church was completed in 1875 at a cost of £6,000. In 1893 a nurses' home was built on site.

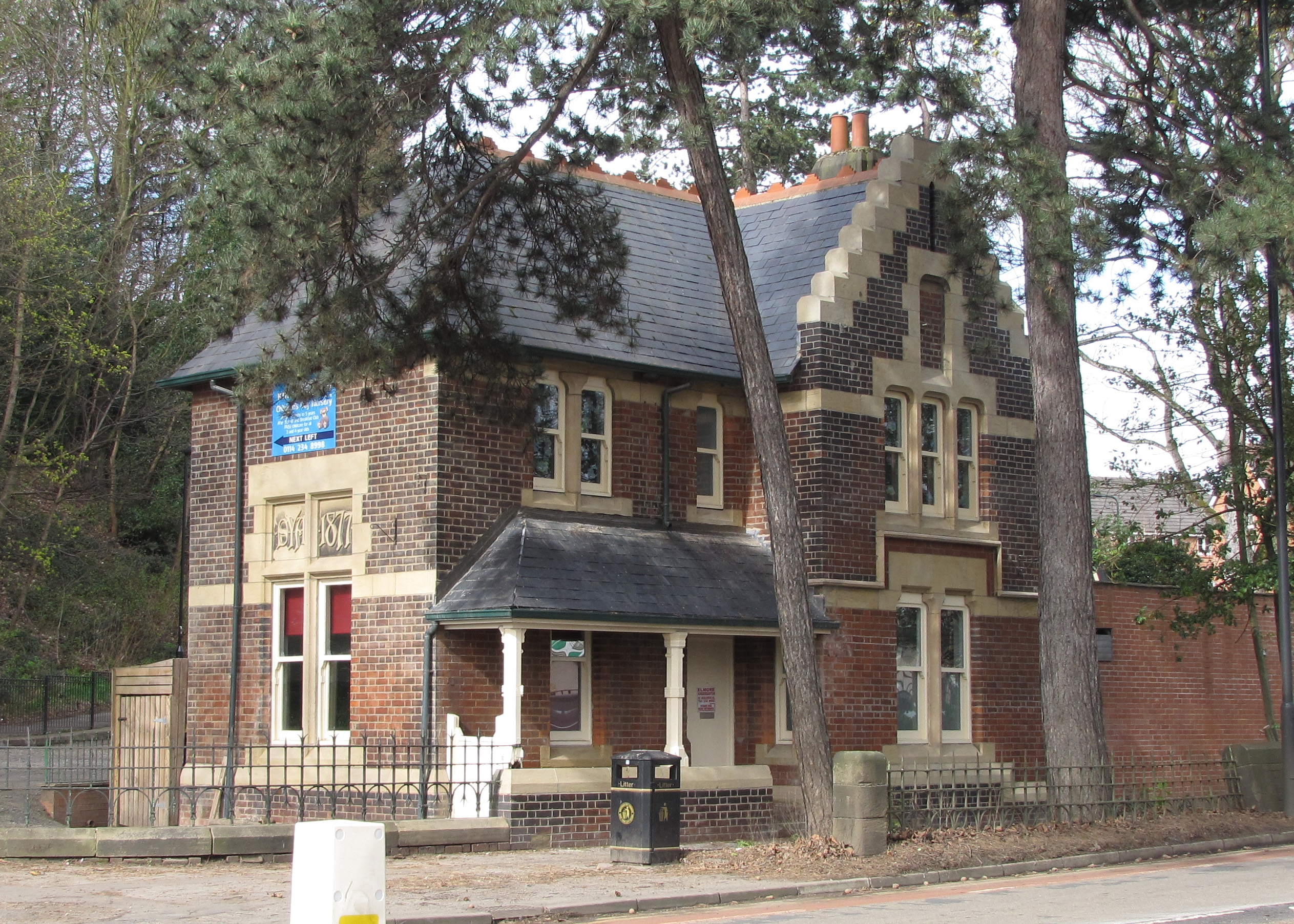
The Lodge on Middlewood Road is now part of a nursery

During the First World War the hospital became the Wharncliffe War Hospital with all mental patients sent to other hospitals across the north of England in March 1915 and 1,500 beds then being made available to the War Office for the treatment of sick and wounded soldiers. King George V toured the War Hospital in September 1915 during a visit to Sheffield. The War Hospital closed in July 1920 having dealt with an estimated 37,000 casualties since the start of the war.

The hospital was once more utilised for emergency use during the Second World War, with one third of its accommodation being designated The Wharncliffe Emergency Hospital and made available to treat military casualties. This continued as a small general medical unit after the war called 'Wharncliffe Hospital', providing medical and surgical facilities until the mid-1970s. Post-war developments saw the hospital integrated into the National Health Service (NHS) and renamed Middlewood Hospital. It continued to be the designated mental health accommodation for South Yorkshire with over 2,000 beds.

=== Run down and closure ===
By the 1970s it became clear that future psychiatric treatment would be based on general hospital units, day care facilities and other services provided by local authorities, and by 1984 the hospital’s management team were planning the running down of the hospital. In 1986 the number of patients at Middlewood had reduced to 600 as a community oriented service was developed in conjunction with the NHS and Sheffield City Council. The implementation of the National Health Service and Community Care Act 1990 reinforced the provision of community based mental health care by the NHS and the local authority and Middlewood Hospital was listed for closure within five years. It finally closed in 1996.

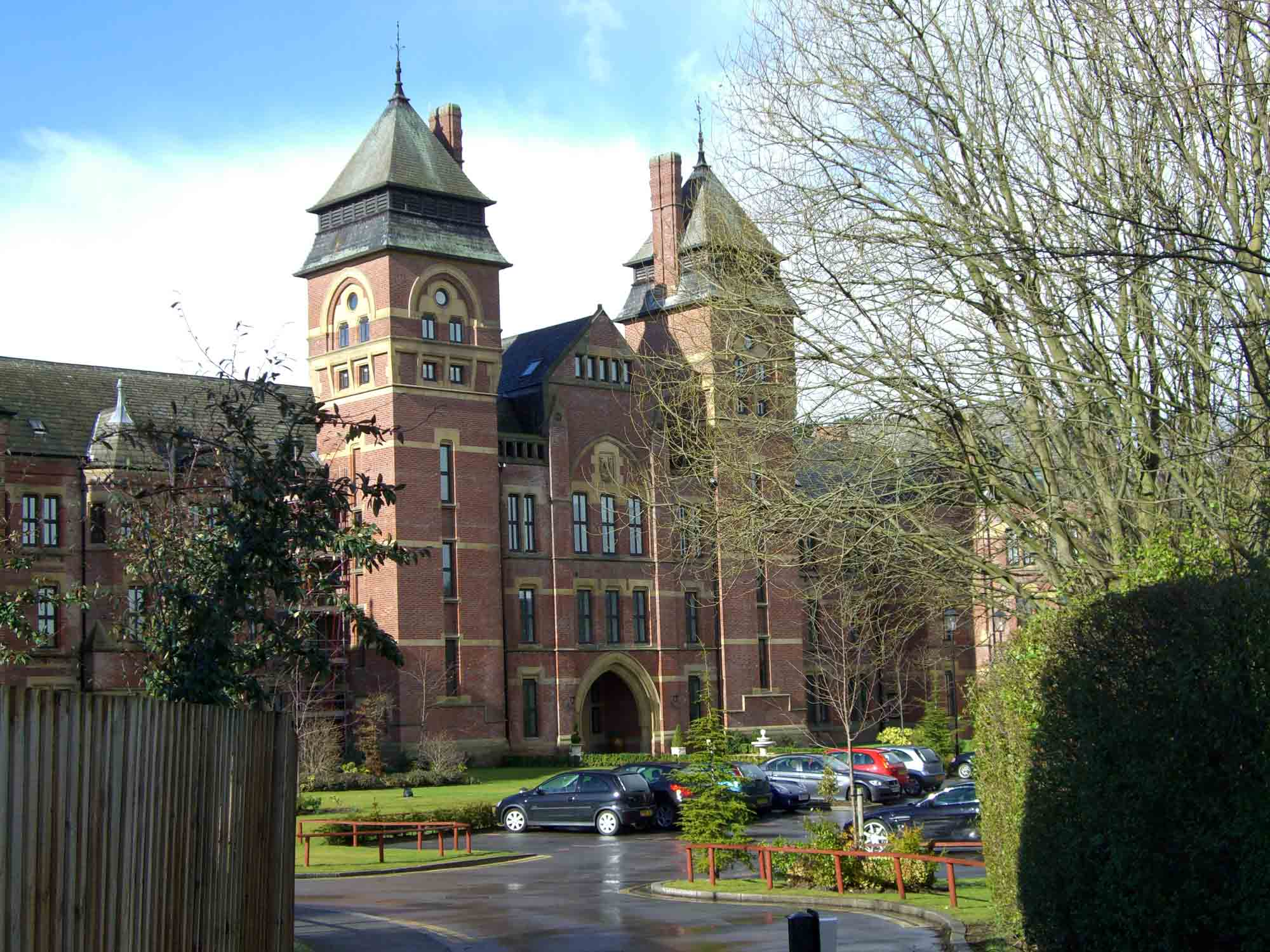
The Kingwood ward has been converted into 85 apartments.

=== Redevelopment ===
After its closure, the land of the former Middlewood Hospital was purchased for residential development by Bloor Homes. It was sold off to various other developers such as Redrow, Barratt, Harron Homes, Wimpey and PJ Livesey although Bloor’s were the major house builder for the new Wadsley Park estate which was constructed on the site of the old hospital. The Wadsley Park village consists of a mixture of houses and apartments of various sizes. Some of the old hospital structures were designated as listed buildings, the main admin block (the clock tower), Kingswood ward, the church and the porters lodge were all grade II listed and could not be demolished with the rest of the hospital.

The administration building and clock tower were converted into 38 luxury apartments by Urbani after permission to demolish the building was denied and the building is now known as Middlewood Lodge. The Kingswood ward has been converted into 85 apartments by developers PJ Livesey and is known as Kingswood Hall. The porter's lodge on Middlewood Road has been refurbished and is now a nursery. The hospital church has been derelict for many years, it held its last service on 6 November 1996 to mark the closure of the hospital. In March 2012 plans were submitted by architectural design consultancy Coda Studios to converted the Victorian church into a mixture of town houses and apartments. The scheme also contained proposals for a selection of partially underground eco-friendly bungalows beneath the building. The planning application was formally refused by Sheffield City Council in July 2020 on the grounds it would have a negative impact on the Listed Building and the Conservation Area surrounding it.

=== Wadsley Fossil Forest ===
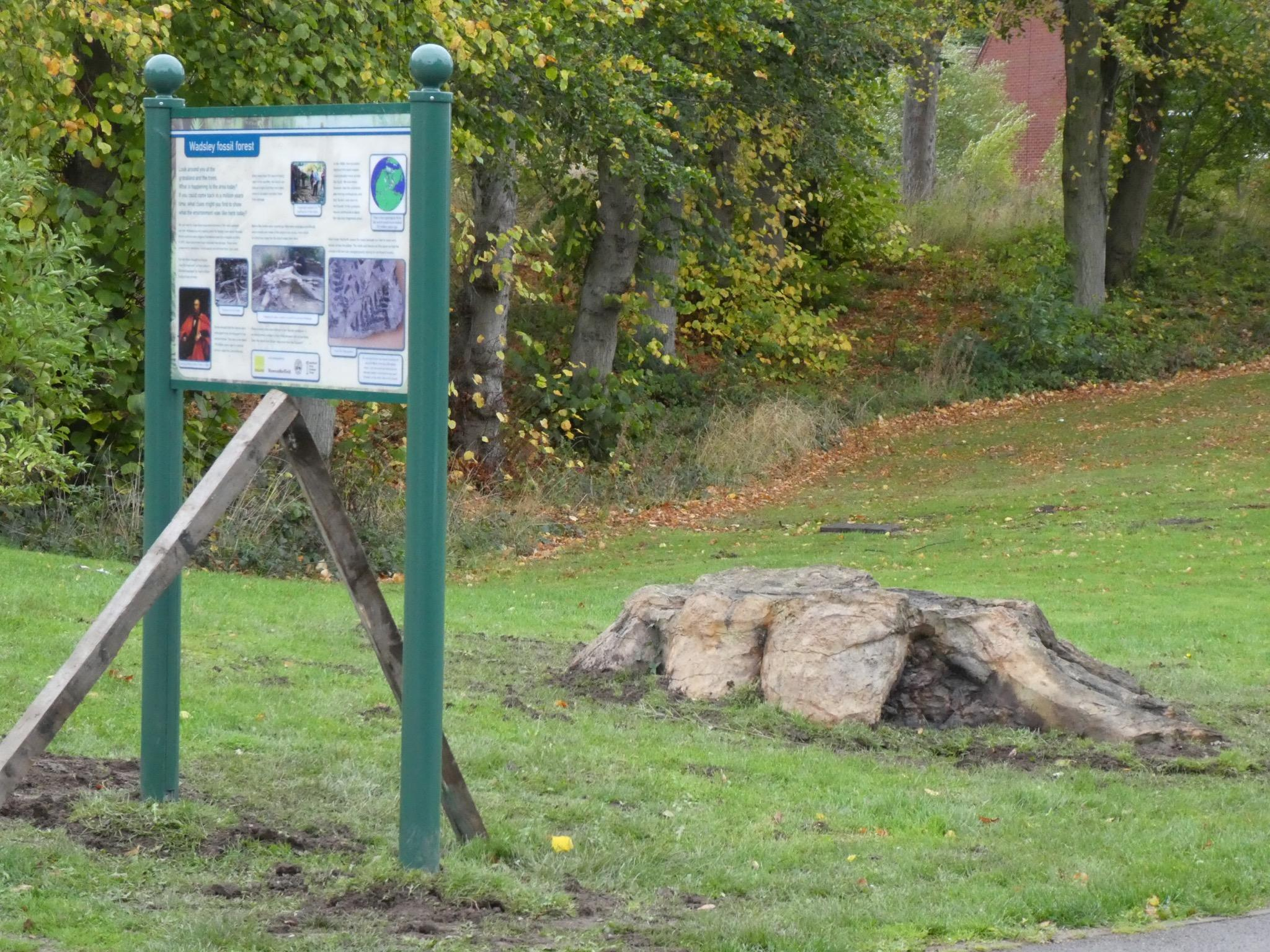
Wadsley Fossil Forest Interpretation Board and replica cast of a fossil tree stump

In the autumn of 1873, about a year after the South Yorkshire Lunatic Asylum opened, workers excavating the hillside to create level access ground at the back of the asylum, uncovered the remains of a group of large fossilised tree stumps, complete with roots and preserved in hard sandstone. The stumps display long roots on one side and short on the other, which scientists at the time considered an indication of the ancient wind direction. The discovery was judged so significant that in 1875, under the direction of the eminent Sheffield scientist Henry Clifton Sorby, two sheds with large windows were built to protect the biggest stumps from the weather and allow visitors to view the fossils. Over time the sheds and the fossil stumps fell into disrepair so that by the time of the closure of the hospital the fossil stumps had weathered into mounds of earth and exposed to loss of material by souvenir hunters.

Wadsley Fossil Forest contains what is considered to be the best preserved example in the British Isles of trees which were part of the extensive coal forming swamp forests growing about 310 million years ago during the Westphalian stage of the Carboniferous Period. Such preserved stumps provide a useful insight into the growth-habit of arborescent clubmosses and into the community structure of the forest. They also clarify details of how the trees were killed and how they became entombed in the sediment. The site is thus of considerable palaeobotanical interest.

When the site of Middlewood Hospital was redeveloped as Wadsley Park Village, the fossil tree stumps were saved from the bulldozer as they have a special preservation order to protect them (Site of Special Scientific Interest status). Following a scientific study project at the time of house construction they are now buried under open space adjacent to Middlewood Drive.

With support from Natural England, Museums Sheffield, The Geologists' Association and Sheffield Area Geology Trust, a double-sided information board and a replica cast of one of the stumps was placed at the site in October 2018.

=== Records ===
The records of Middlewood Hospital (1872 – 1996) are held at Sheffield Archives. These include patient admission registers dating back to 1872 which list the names of the many thousands of people who passed through the asylum, detailing ages, occupations and 'causes of insanity'. The names of all patients admitted to Middlewood Hospital between 1872 and 1910 have been transcribed and can be searched using indexes.

== Notable patients ==
- Poet David Miedzianik spent time at the hospital in the late 1970s while being treated for autism, which was the catalyst for his interest in poetry.

== See also ==
- List of hospitals in England
