= Wide Blue Yonder (album) =

Studio album by Oysterband
- Released: 1987
- Genre: British folk rock
- Length: 56:02
- Label: Cooking Vinyl
- Producer: Clive Gregson

Oysterband chronology
| Step Outside (1986) | Wide Blue Yonder (1987) | Ride (1989) |

Wide Blue Yonder is a 1987 album by British folk rock band Oysterband. As well as traditional material it features covers of "Between the Wars" by Billy Bragg and "The Rose of England" by Nick Lowe. The album is produced by Clive Gregson.

== Track listing ==
1. "The Generals are Born Again" (Telfer, Prosser) - 4:08
2. "The Early Days of a Better Nation" (Telfer, Jones) - 3:18
3. "Pigsty Billy" (Telfer, Jones, Prosser) - 3:32
4. "The Oxford Girl" (Jones, Telfer) - 4:09
5. "The Rose of England" (Nick Lowe) - 3:19
6. "Hal-An-Tow" (Trad.) - 4:22
7. "Flatlands" (Telfer) - 5:41
8. "The Lost and Found" (Telfer, Prosser) - 4:27
9. "Another Quiet Night in England" (Jones, Telfer) - 4:08
10. "Coal Creek Mine" (Green Bailey) - 3:16
11. "Between the Wars" (Billy Bragg) - 3:19
12. "The Lakes of Cool Flynn" (Trad.) - 4:15
13. "Following in Fathers Footsteps" (Telfer, Prosser, Jones) - 4:03
14. "A Careless Life" (Telfer, Prosser) - 3:46
