= Isla Cameron =

Scottish actress and singer (1927–1980)

- Isla Cameron, detail from front cover of her 1966 XTRA album

Background information
- Born: 5 March 1927; Blairgowrie, Perthshire, Scotland
- Died: 3 April 1980 (aged 53) Islington, London, England
- Genre: Folk
- Occupations: Actress, singer
- Years active: 1945–1974

Isla Cameron (5 March 1927 – 3 April 1980) was a Scottish-born, English-raised actress and singer. AllMusic noted that "Cameron was one of a quartet of key figures in England's postwar folk song revival – and to give a measure of her importance, the other three were Ewan MacColl, A. L. Lloyd, and Alan Lomax". She was a respected and popular folk music performer through the 1950s and early 60s as well as appearing in several films; she focused almost exclusively on her acting career from 1966 onwards. Cameron provided the singing voice for actress Julie Christie's part in the hit 1967 film version of Thomas Hardy's Far From the Madding Crowd, but changed career direction and became a film researcher in the early 1970s before her early death in a domestic accident in 1980. One of the traditional songs in her repertoire, "Blackwaterside", recorded by Cameron in 1962, was subsequently popularised by notable "next generation" U.K. folk music performers Anne Briggs, Bert Jansch and Sandy Denny.

== Early life and experience ==
Isla Cameron was born in Blairgowrie, Scotland, but spent her childhood and teens in Newcastle upon Tyne. Growing up on Tyneside, she learned some traditional children's songs and rhymes but always considered herself a revivalist rather than a traditional singer, selecting a range of songs to sing from wherever she found them to her liking. In around 1945 Joan Littlewood, who had co-founded the Theatre Workshop with husband Ewan MacColl, was performing with the Workshop in Newcastle and, impressed by the "absolutely pure voice" of Cameron, then in her late teens, invited her to join as lead singer-narrator for a production of a MacColl-authored ballad opera entitled "Johnny Noble", since the person previously in this role was leaving to get married. Cameron joined, and went on to perform with the Workshop for four years, including tours with different productions in England, Germany, Sweden, and Czechoslovakia.

== Singing career ==
MacColl encouraged Cameron to pursue a singing career, one result of which was the issuing of a 78 rpm recording on His Master's Voice in c. 1951, featuring Cameron singing an unaccompanied rendition of "The Fair Flower of Northumberland", noted in her obituary as "a daring innovation in those days". Additional unaccompanied performances released at that time comprise "The Turtle Dove" backed with "Lay The Bent to the Bonnie Broom", and "Died for Love" plus "The Queen's Maries" backed with "Queen Jane". She also appeared on tracks of her own on two joint Topic 78 releases in 1951 with MacColl, singing "Cannily, Cannily" on one release, and "The Firman [Fireman]'s Not For Me" on the other. Cameron was also featured frequently on MacColl's radio series "Ballads and Blues". In 1951, the American folklorist Alan Lomax visited Britain to compile 2 volumes in a monumental Columbia LP series entitled "A World Library of Folk and Primitive Music", Cameron contributed three songs, "My Bonny Lad", "Brigg Fair" and "Died For Love" to Volume 3 of the series, released in 1955, and a fourth, "O Can Ye Sew Cushions?", to Volume 6, released the same year, which dealt with the music of Scotland. Lomax's recordings that include Cameron, both released and unreleased, are presently held in the Alan Lomax Archive at the Library of Congress.

Peter Kennedy produced a series of Sunday morning BBC Radio programs in 1953 and 1954, called As I Roved Out. Two of these were later issued on the Folktrax label, with Cameron singing three folk songs, Seamus Ennis playing uilleann pipes and tin whistle, Ewan MacColl singing some songs and Ron and Bob Copper also singing. In 1956, she appeared in another radio program, Ballads and Blues: Sea Music. Also in 1956, Cameron released a solo album of British folk songs, Through Bushes and Briars, on the U.S. Tradition label run by Patrick Clancy of The Clancy Brothers. She appeared on the 1958 album Folksong Jubilee with Rory & Alex McEwen singing on 7 tracks (2 of them solo), and with Ewan MacColl on the 1958 Riverside (U.S.) album English and Scottish Love Songs, performing on 8 tracks accompanied by the American performer Ralph Rinzler on banjo and guitar; a number of the same tracks (with some additional ones from the same session) were shared with a 1958 Topic (U.K.) album entitled Still I Love Him.

Meanwhile, in 1957, a U.K. film company, Data Film Productions, had filmed Ewan MacColl, assisted by Cameron and others, singing a number of songs about coal mining for the National Coal Board, illustrating them with "little proto-pop-promos featuring local people in the relevant regions as their casts" (it is not clear how many feature Cameron). Under the name "Songs of the Coalfields", these were released as six separate stories in episodes of "Mining Review" (a monthly newsreel "magazine" for the coal industry and mining communities) and later (1964) combined as a single 16mm film, available in the British Film Institute archive. She also participated in the recording of three of Ewan MacColl & Peggy Seeger's "Radio Ballads", entitled The Ballad of John Axon (1959), Song of a Road (1959) and The Big Hewer (1961), later released on LP in 1965 and 1967 although Song of a Road was not issued until 1999.

In 1960, "The Singers Club" opened in The Princess Louise public house in Holborn, London. It was run by MacColl and his new wife, Peggy Seeger. Cameron became a resident at this folk club and continued to have a high profile as a singer, while at the same time, her film career was also taking off. With fellow Tyneside artist Louis Killen, Cameron released a 1961 album entitled The Waters of Tyne: Northumbrian Songs and Ballads, and in 1962, an album with Tony Britton entitled Songs of Love, Lust and Loose Living. Also in 1962, Cameron contributed 6 songs to a Folkways (U.S.) release entitled The Jupiter Book of Ballads, performing "Lord Randall", "The Dowie Dens of Yarrow", "Mary Hamilton" (with John Laurie), "Blackwaterside", "High Barbaree", and "The House of the Rising Sun". That same year, her own full-length album was released in the U.S. on Prestige International, entitled The Best of Isla Cameron, with guitar, banjo and autoharp accompaniment provided by Peggy Seeger. The following year Peter Kennedy recorded her singing with accompaniment by Jack Armstrong on Northumbrian pipes, for an album Northumbrian Minstrelsy (shared with Bob Davenport and the Rakes) on which she performed 6 songs. In 1963–1964, she was regularly featured in Rory McEwen's Blues and Folk music programme on ABC regional television entitled "Hullabaloo". In 1965, Cameron was one of several performers who took part in "Hallelujah!", a Sunday evening TV series devised by Sydney Carter and featuring Carter himself, Cameron, Nadia Cattouse, the Johnny Scott Trio and Martin Carthy; an album featuring selections from the series was issued on Fontana in 1966, featuring Cameron on lead vocal on six selections and joining with the remaining cast on two more.

In 1966 she released another full-length album, entitled simply Isla Cameron, on XTRA records, this time accompanied by Martin Carthy on guitar on 6 of the 12 tracks, the others being performed unaccompanied. On this record she sang songs by Bob Dylan and Bertold Brecht, in addition to traditional numbers. By this time, Cameron, now in her late-30s, was an established and well regarded performer on the U.K. folk music scene, one of her featured songs "Blackwaterside" being influential on the emerging next generation of younger performers such as Anne Briggs, Bert Jansch and Sandy Denny, all of whom subsequently recorded versions of it. (Note: Although Briggs' (and thence, Jansch's) version of the song is sometimes stated as being supplied by A. L. Lloyd (and Briggs herself stated this later, in the sleeve notes to a reissued version), consensus is that it likely originates from Cameron's 1962 recording. The wider influence of Cameron's body of work and in-concert appearances has, however, been little addressed by subsequent researchers.) However following the release of her 1966 self-titled album, Cameron decided to concentrate more on her acting career, and also film roles.

== Acting career ==
In 1959, Cameron appeared, uncredited, in the film Room at the Top. Her most memorable cinematic moment was in 1961 in the spooky thriller The Innocents, where she imitated a child's voice and sang "Oh, Willow Waly". The composer Georges Auric incorporated her singing into the orchestral soundtrack. Another horror film, Nightmare, followed in 1964. She acted in the 1967 version of Far From the Madding Crowd but her contribution was left on the cutting room floor. However, her voice appeared on the soundtrack album, singing "Bushes and Briars" (Julie Christie mimed in the film) and "The Bold Grenadier". Trevor Lucas, later to become the husband of Sandy Denny also sang on the album, and Dave Swarbrick played on some of the tunes. Her most prominent acting role was as the stern librarian Miss McKenzie in the 1969 version of The Prime of Miss Jean Brodie, where she could use her Scottish accent to advantage.

== Later life and death ==
In 1971, a boyfriend of Cameron's was killed in a car crash and she retreated for some time to live in Yorkshire. In 1972 she returned to London and started to work as a film researcher, moving into a flat in Pimlico and virtually retiring from singing. She died in her home on 3 April 1980, having apparently choked to death while eating. An obituary in a 1981 issue of Folk Music Journal stated that she "died after mis-swallowing some food."

== Discography ==
=== Solo 78 releases ===
- 1951?: "The Fair Flower of Northumberland"/?? HMV [untraced, possibly erroneous citation in published work]
- 1951: "The Turtle Dove"/"Lay The Bent to the Bonnie Broom" HMV (10") B.10110
- 1951: "Died for Love" plus "The Queen's Maries"/"Queen Jane" HMV (10") B.10111

=== 78 releases with Ewan MacColl ===
- 1951: "Cannily, Cannily" (Isla Cameron) / "Poor Paddy Works on the Railway" (Ewan MacColl) / Topic TRC 50
- 1951: "Moses on the Mail" (Ewan MacColl) / "The Firman [Fireman]'s Not For Me" (Isla Cameron) Topic TRC 51

(Isla Cameron's 2 tracks were later included in Topic's first LP release, "Ewan MacColl with Isla Cameron & The Topic Singers")

=== Solo albums ===
- 1956: Through Bushes and Briars and Other Songs of the British Isles Tradition TLP 1001
- 1962: The Best of Isla Cameron Prestige International INT 13042
- 1964: Lost Love (EP, 5 tracks) Transatlantic TRA EP 109 (tracks come from the 1962 LP "Songs of Love, Lust and Loose Living" with Tony Britton (TRA 105))
- 1966: Isla Cameron Transatlantic XTRA 1040

=== Peggy Seeger, Isla Cameron and Guy Carawan ===
- 1957: Peggy Seeger presents Origins of Skiffle (EP, four tracks) Pye Jazz NJE 1043

=== Rory and Alex McEwen and Isla Cameron ===
- 1958: Folksong Jubilee HMV CLP 1220

=== Ewan MacColl and Isla Cameron ===
- 1958: English and Scottish Love Songs Riverside RLP 12-656
- 1958: (as Isla Cameron and Ewan MacColl): Still I Love Him Topic Records 10T50 (many tracks duplicated with the above album, some with altered titles)
- 1957/1964: Songs of the Coalfields Data Film Productions (6 short films, re-released as single combined version in 1964)

=== Various artists (1960) ===
- Various artists, 1960: Field Trip – England Folkways FW08871. Isla Cameron sings "Johnny Todd" (with Ewan MacColl) and "Bushes and Briars". The notes say "Collected by Jean Ritchie & George Pickow".

=== Isla Cameron and Louis Killen ===
- 1961: The Waters of Tyne Prestige International INT 13059

=== Isla Cameron and Tony Britton ===
- 1962: Songs of Love, Lust and Loose Living Transatlantic TRA 105; also issued as Transatlantic XTRA 1042, 1966

=== Various artists (Isla Cameron, Jill Balcon, Pauline Letts, John Laurie plus others ===
- 1962: The Jupiter Book of Ballads Folkways FL 9890

=== Isla Cameron, Bob Davenport, Jack Armstrong & The Rakes ===
- 1964: Northumbrian Minstrelsy Concert Hall AM 2339

=== With Ewan MacColl and others ===
- Various artists, 1956: Ballads & Blues – Sea Music Folktrax Cassette CASS-0376 (singers are Cy Grant, A.L. Lloyd, Isla Cameron, Ewan McColl) – a radio recording of MacColl's Ballads and Blues series 1953 episode "The Singing Sailormen", RPL radio, produced by Denis Mitchell. Cameron sings "Lowlands (Away)" and "My Bonny Lad".
- Ewan MacColl & Peggy Seeger, 1965: The Ballad of John Axon Argo RG 474 (singers are Ewan MacColl, A.L. Lloyd, Isla Cameron, Fitzroy Coleman, Stan Kelly, Dick Loveless, Charles Mayo, Colin Dunn & Dominic Behan) (originally broadcast 1959)
- Ewan MacColl & Peggy Seeger, 1967: The Big Hewer Argo RG 538 (singers are Isla Cameron, Ian Campbell, Joe Higgins, Louis Killen, A.L. Lloyd, Ewan MacColl) (originally broadcast 1961)
- Ewan MacColl & Peggy Seeger, 1999: Song of a Road Topic TSCD802 (singers are Isla Cameron, John Clarence, Séamus Ennis, Louis Killen, A.L. Lloyd, Ewan MacColl, Jimmy Macgregor, Francis McPeake, Isabel Sutherland, Cyril Tawney, William V. Thomas) (originally broadcast 1959)

=== With Sydney Carter, Martin Carthy, and others ===
- Isla Cameron, Sydney Carter, Martin Carthy and Nadia Cattouse with the Johnny Scott Trio, 1966: Songs from ABC Television's "Hallelujah" Fontana TL5356. Isla Cameron sings "Two Brothers", Bertolt Brecht's "Wife of the Soldier", Tom Paxton's "Goodman, Schwerner And Chaney", "Gift to be Simple", "Whistle Daughter Whistle", "Johnny Has Gone for a Soldier", and joins the entire cast on "Shalom" and "Last Night I Had The Strangest Dream".

In 2009, "The Firman [Fireman]'s Not For Me" from the second Topic 78 release was included in Topic Records 70 year anniversary boxed set Three Score and Ten as track fifteen on the fourth CD.

=== Film soundtracks ===
- 1961 (?1962): Isla Cameron and The Raymonde Singers: Just A Wearyin' For You / O Willow Waly (Theme from "The Innocents") (7" single)
- 1967: Richard Rodney Bennett: Far from the Madding Crowd Original Motion Picture Soundtrack MGM C-8053/CS-8053 (Isla Cameron sings "Bushes and Briars" and "The Bold Grenadier")

=== Anthologies ===
- 1956: Ewan MacColl with Isla Cameron & The Topic Singers Topic TRL1 (includes Isla Cameron's 2 early Topic 78 tracks)
- 1964: Folk Songs: Topic Sampler 1
- 1967: The Best of Scottish Folk Music
- 1968: 100 Folk Songs and New Songs
- 2000: The Best of Scottish Folk
