= Freedom and Rain =

Studio album by Oysterband and June Tabor
- Released: 10 September 1990
- Studios: The Yard, Southall, England
- Genre: British folk rock
- Length: 39:00
- Label: Cooking Vinyl
- Producer: Oysterband

Oysterband chronology
| Little Rock to Leipzig (1990) | Freedom and Rain (1990) | Deserters (1992) |

June Tabor chronology
| Some Other Time (1989) | Freedom and Rain (1990) | Angel Tiger (1992) |

Freedom and Rain is a 1990 album by British folk rock band Oysterband and singer June Tabor. The album features a mixture of traditional material and contemporary covers including "Lullaby of London" by Shane MacGowan, "All Tomorrow's Parties" by Lou Reed, "Valentine's Day Is Over" by Billy Bragg and "Night Comes In" by Richard Thompson. It was produced by Oysterband.

Oysterband and Tabor would reunite for the 2011 album Ragged Kingdom.

== Critical reception ==
Professional ratings
Review scores
| Source | Rating |
|---|---|
| AllMusic | 4/5 stars |
| MusicHound Folk: The Essential Album Guide | 4/5 stars |
| Select | 3/5 |

The Edmonton Journal said that "Tabor's solemn magnificence commands the usual reverence, while the Oysters bump and grind in typical cavalier fashion.". AllMusic's Richie Unterberger wrote, "Tabor teams up with one of Britain's leading folk-rock outfits, the Oyster Band, with fairly successful results, although it won't be the favorite of June's most traditionally-minded fans."

== Track listing ==
1. "Mississippi" (Si Kahn) - 3:18
2. "Lullaby of London" (Shane MacGowan) - 2:45
3. "Night Comes In" (Richard Thompson) - 4:54
4. "Valentine's Day Is Over" (Billy Bragg) - 3:26
5. "All Tomorrow's Parties" (Lou Reed) - 3:47
6. "Dives and Lazarus" (Trad.) - 4:18
7. "Dark Eyed Sailor" (Trad.) - 4:15
8. "Pain or Paradise" (John Tams) - 3:13
9. "Susie Clelland" (Trad.) - 5:16
10. "Finisterre" (Ian Telfer) - 3:45
