= Rise Above (Oysterband album) =

Studio album by Oysterband
- Released: 2002
- Recorded: 2002
- Genre: Folk rock
- Length: 38:26
- Label: Running Man
- Producer: Alan Scott

Oysterband chronology
| Here I Stand (1999) | Rise Above (2002) | 25 (2003) |

Professional ratings
Review scores
| Source | Rating |
|---|---|
| Allmusic | 4/5 stars |

Rise Above is an album by British folk music group Oysterband, released in 2002.

== Track listing ==
All songs by Chopper, Jones, Partis, Prosser, and Telfer, unless otherwise indicated.

1. "The Soul's Electric" – 3:42
2. "Uncommercial Song" – 3:40
3. "If You Can't be Good" – 3:45
4. "Everybody's Leaving Home" – 4:27
5. "My Mouth" – 4:14
6. "Shouting about Jerusalem" – 3:30
7. "Blackwaterside" (Trad.) – 3:41
8. "Rise Above" – 3:42
9. "Wayfaring" – 4:30
10. "Bright Morning Star" (Trad.) – 3:15

== Credits ==
- John Jones – vocals, melodeon
- Alan Prosser – guitars, guitar Synthesizer, bouzouki, mandolin, vocals
- Chopper – cello, bass instruments, kantele
- Lee Partis – drums, vocals
- Ian Telfer – fiddle, concertina
- Nuela Friedman – accordion
- Rowan Godel – vocals
- Benji Kirkpatrick – bouzouki, guitar
- James O'Grady – uilleann pipes, whistles
- Matt Savage – keyboards
