= Silly Sisters (album) =

Studio album by Maddy Prior & June Tabor
- Released: 1976
- Genre: Folk rock
- Length: 41:52
- Label: Chrysalis
- Producer: Maddy Prior, Robin Black

Maddy Prior & June Tabor chronology
Silly Sisters (1976)	No More to the Dance (1988)

Maddy Prior chronology
Silly Sisters (1976)	Woman in the Wings (1978)

Professional ratings
Review scores
Source	Rating
AllMusic	5/5 stars

Silly Sisters is a 1976 album by English folk singers Maddy Prior and June Tabor, their first collaborative effort as a duo. The pair later adopted the Silly Sisters name for subsequent projects. The songs cover a wide range of subjects – work, religion, sexual relations, humour, tragedy and the absurd.

Among the session musicians are Martin Carthy, Nic Jones and Andy Irvine who have each recorded solo albums. Johnny Moynihan has recorded with Anne Briggs, Planxty and Sweeney's Men. Danny Thompson has recorded with Pentangle, Ralph McTell, Richard Thompson, Nick Drake and John Martyn, among others.

== Track listing ==
1. "Doffin' Mistress" (Traditional)
  "Doffin' Mistress" was first recorded by Anne Briggs in 1963 on The Iron Muse, and possibly originates in the cotton mills of Ulster. Her version was an influence on both June Tabor and Maddy Prior in their decisions to become singers.
2. "Burning of Auchindoon" (Traditional)
  Child Ballad 183. Based on events in 1592, it concerns a feud between the Huntly family and the Earl of Moray. The ruins of Auchindoun Castle still exist.
3. "Lass of Loch Royal" (Traditional)
  Child Ballad 76. Also known as "Lord Gregory". Words published by Herd 1776, and in the Scots Musical Museum in 1787. Recorded by Elizabeth Cronin in 1951 and the Everly Brothers in 1959.
4. "The Seven Joys of Mary" (Traditional)
  The earliest version of this song is from the fourteenth century ("Joyes Fyve"). Also collected by Cecil Sharp in 1918 from Mrs Nichols.
5. "My Husband's Got No Courage In Him" (Traditional)
  A tragic but bawdy song that was first recorded by Jeannie Robertson.
6. "Singing The Travels" (Traditional)
  Collected from the Symondsbury Mummers. A dispute between a husbandman (a self-employed farmer) and a serving man. Maddy and June sang the same song again on the live album "Ballads and Candles" in 2000, with an extra verse.
7. "Silver Whistle" (Traditional)
  A Jacobite song from Flora MacNeil, translated from Gaelic. Music by Johnny Moynihan.
8. "The Grey Funnel Line" (Cyril Tawney)
  A description of the daily life of a sailor in the Royal Navy (often nicknamed "The grey funnel line" from the battleship grey of its livery), written by Cyril Tawney based on his own life. This recording was used in the opening title sequence in the film Sirens starring Hugh Grant.
9. "Geordie" (Traditional)
  Child Ballad 209. A song about Scottish clan loyalty in the Hay family.
10. "The Seven Wonders" (Traditional)
  A Welsh song collected from Jill King. A sequence of ever-more improbable events.
11. "Four Loom Weaver" (Traditional)
  A song about unemployment in the nineteenth century, possibly dating from 1819-20. First recorded by Ewan MacColl in 1951.
12. "The Game Of Cards" (Traditional)
  Also known as "The Game of All Fours". Noted by Cecil Sharp in 1908. Another erotic song, this time using the language of playing cards to serve as innuendo to another sort of game.
13. "Dame Durden" (Traditional)
  "Alright, chaps. Food!" says Martin Carthy at the start of the song, calling the musicians together. A Copper Family song which is a variation on the "Widdicombe Fair" theme.

== Personnel ==
- Maddy Prior – vocals
- June Tabor – vocals
- Martin Carthy – guitar, drum
- Nic Jones – fiddle
- Tony Hall – melodeon
- Andy Irvine – mandolin
- Johnny Moynihan – bouzouki, tin whistle
- Gabriel McKeon – uilleann pipes
- Danny Thompson – bass
- John Gillaspie – bassoon, bombarde, sopranino saxophone
- Brian Golbey – five-string fiddle
- Louis Jardin – percussion
- Mick Rock – photography
