= Silly Sisters =

English folk music duo

The Silly Sisters is an English folk music duo, formed in 1976 by Maddy Prior and June Tabor. Both of their albums were well-received by reviewers.

== History ==
Prior and Tabor met at Oxford in the 1960s. At first, they performed together under their own names. They released their first album, Silly Sisters, in 1976, and later took this name as the name of their duo. They toured together in the 1980s, and released a subsequent album No More to the Dance in 1988, on the Shanachie Records label. "The Silly Sisters was conceived as a one-off project," Tabor explained in 1990. "We said, let's see if we can still sing together, and we could." A Chicago Tribune review of this second album called it "nearly flawless", "elegantly understated" and "brazenly witty".

In 2009 the song Hedger and Ditcher from No More to the Dance was included in the Topic Records 70th anniversary boxed set Three Score and Ten, as track 17 on the seventh CD.

== Discography ==
- 1976: Silly Sisters (as "Maddy Prior & June Tabor")
- 1988: No More to the Dance
