= A Cut Above =

Studio album by June Tabor
- Released: 1980
- Label: Topic: 12TS410 (UK); Green Linnet: GLCD 3072 (US)

June Tabor chronology
Ashes and Diamonds (1977)	A Cut Above (1980)	Abyssinians (1983)

Professional ratings
Review scores
Source	Rating
Allmusic	4.5/5 stars

A Cut Above is a folk album by June Tabor and Martin Simpson released in 1980 on Topic Records, catalogue number 12TS410. The album was re-released on CD in UK on Topic Records in 1989 and was released on Green Linnet in the US in 1992.

The album was produced by Paul Brown and engineered by John Acock at Millstream Studios, Cheltenham and includes a number of traditional songs, as well songs by Roger Watson, Richard Thompson, Peter Bond and Bill Caddick.

== Reception ==
AllMusic reviewer Rick Anderson awarded the album 4.5 stars. In 2008 the BBC's Mike Harding said: "When you get two wonderful musicians together the end result is not always the sum of the parts ... In this case they obviously pushed each other on to greater things because the end result is magnificent.

== Track listing ==
1. "Admiral Benbow" (Roud 3141) – 2:41
2. "Davy Lowston" (Traditional) – 4:50
3. "Flash Company" (Roud 954) – 2:42
4. "Number Two Top Seam" (Roger Watson) – 3:11
5. "Strange Affair" (Richard Thompson) – 5:50
6. "Heather Down the Moor" (Roud 375; G/D 5:962; Henry H177) – 2:48
7. "Joe Peel" (Peter Bond) – 3:38
8. "Le Roi Renaud" (Traditional) – 6:35
9. "Riding Down to Portsmouth" – (Roud 1534) 1:07
10. "Unicorns" (Bill Caddick) – 5:09

== Personnel ==
- June Tabor – vocals
- Martin Simpson – guitars
- Ric Sanders – violin
- Dave Bristow – piano, synthesiser
- Jon Davie – bass
- The Prunettes: Louisa Livingstone, Dik Cadbury, Martin Simpson, Ric Sanders, Dave Bristow, Paul Brown
