= Ride (Oysterband album) =

Studio album by Oysterband
- Released: 1989
- Genre: British folk rock
- Length: 48:00
- Label: Cooking Vinyl
- Producer: Dave Young

Oysterband chronology
| Wide Blue Yonder (1987) | Ride (1989) | Little Rock to Leipzig (1990) |

Ride is a 1989 album by British folk rock band Oysterband. The album features a cover of the New Order song "Love Vigilantes".

== Critical reception ==
Professional ratings
Review scores
| Source | Rating |
|---|---|
| AllMusic | 3/5 stars |
| New Musical Express | 7/10 |

Martin Aston, reviewer of British music newspaper Music Week, called Oysterband "best band in Folk Roots last three polls" but complained that they lost a half of their roots here while making sound more modern.

== Track listing ==
=== LP ===
==== Side 1 ====
1. "New York Girls" (Traditional) - 3:02
2. "Gamblers (We Do Not Do That Anymore)" (Ian Telfer / Alan Prosser)- 4:24
3. "Take Me Down" (Telfer / Prosser / John Jones) - 3:50
4. "Cheekbone City" (Telfer / Prosser) - 5:03
5. "Love Vigilantes" (Stephen Morris / Peter Hook / Bernard Sumner / Gillian Gilbert) - 3:58

==== Side 2 ====
1. "Too Late Now" (Telfer / Prosser / Jones / Kearey) - 4:05
2. "Polish Plain" (Telfer / Prosser) - 3:54
3. "Heaven to Calcutta" (Telfer / Prosser / Jones) - 4:06
4. "Tincans" (Telfer / Jones) - 3:30
5. "This Year, Next Year" (Telfer) - 4:31

=== CD version ===
1. "New York Girls" - 3:02
2. "Gamblers (We Do Not Do That Anymore)" - 4:24
3. "Polish Plain" - 3:54
4. "Too Late Now" - 4:05
5. "Tincans" - 3:30
6. "Heaven to Calcutta" - 4:06
7. "This Year, Next Year" - 4:31
8. "My Dog (Knows Where the Bones Are Hid)" (Telfer / Prosser / Jones) - 3:07
9. "The Sins of the Family" (Telfer / Jones) - 4:24
10. "Take Me Down" - 3:50
11. "Cheekbone City" - 5:03
12. "Love Vigilantes" - 3:58

== Personnel ==
- John Jones - Vocals, Melodeon
- Ian Telfer - Fiddle, Alto Saxophone, Organ
- Alan Prosser - Guitars, Vocals, Bones
- Russell Lax - Drums
- Chopper - Bass Guitar, Electric Cello, Vocals

== Issues ==
=== LP ===
- Cooking Vinyl Records COOK 020 (Great Britain)
- Polydor 422 838 400-1 (USA)
- Mercury 838 400-1 (West Germany)

=== CD ===
- Cooking Vinyl Records COOKCD 020 (Great Britain)
- Polydor 422 838 400-2 (USA)
