= Deep Dark Ocean =

Studio album by Oysterband
- Released: 1997
- Genre: Celtic rock, British folk rock
- Length: 42:56
- Label: Cooking Vinyl

Oysterband chronology
The Shouting End of Life (1995)	Deep Dark Ocean (1997)	Here I Stand (1999)

Professional ratings
Review scores
Source	Rating
AllMusic	3/5 stars

Deep Dark Ocean is a 1997 album by British folk rock band Oysterband.

== Track listing ==
1. "Sail On By" (John Jones, Alan Prosser, Ian Telfer) - 3:33
2. "Little Brother" (Jones, Prosser, Telfer) - 3:12
3. "Only When You Call" (Jones, Prosser, Telfer) - 3:34
4. "Native Son" (Jones, Prosser, Telfer) - 4:40
5. "Not Like Jordan" (Prosser, Telfer) - 3:57
6. "North Star" (Ray "Chopper" Cooper, Prosser) - 1:30
7. "Milford Haven" (Jones, Prosser, Telfer) - 3:45
8. "The Story" (Prosser, Telfer) - 4:23
9. "Be My Luck" (Prosser, Telfer) - 2:48
10. "No Reason to Cry" (Jones, Prosser, Telfer) - 4:48
11. "Drunkard's Waltz" (Rev Hammer) - 3:14 / "Native Son (Welsh language version)" (Jones, Prosser, Telfer) - 1:28 (hidden track)

"Little Brother" was written in response to ads David Miedzianik, a poet from Sheffield, would post in magazines requesting songs to be written about autism, a condition from which he suffers, and is about an autistic relative of one of the band members.
