= Courchene =

Surname list

Courchene is a French surname. Notable people with the surname include:

- Ken Courchene, First Nation chief in Canada
- Tom Courchene (born 1940), Canadian economist and professor
- Chris Courchene First Nation Motivational Speaker

== See also ==
- Courchesne
