= Little Rock to Leipzig =

Studio album by Oysterband
- Released: 12 March 1990
- Recorded: January 1989–January 1990
- Genre: Celtic rock, folk rock, alternative rock
- Length: 41:37
- Label: Cooking Vinyl
- Producer: Oysterband, Dave Young (tracks 4–5)

Oysterband chronology
Ride (1989)	Little Rock to Leipzig (1990)	Freedom and Rain (1990)

Little Rock to Leipzig is a 1990 album by British folk-rock band Oysterband. The album is a mixture of live and studio recordings, also a mixture of traditional songs, original recordings and covers of contemporary songs including "I Fought the Law" by Sonny Curtis and "Gonna Do What I Have to Do" by Phil Ochs.

== Track listing ==
1. "Jail Song Two" (Ian Telfer/John Jones/Alan Prosser) - 4:03
2. "The Oxford Girl" (Jones/Telfer) - 4:21
3. "Gonna Do what I Have to Do" (Phil Ochs) - 3:15
4. "Too Late Now" (Telfer/Prosser/Jones/Ian Kearey) - 2:17
5. "Galopede" (Trad.) - 3:00
6. "Red Barn Stomp" (Oysterband) - 4:33
7. "I Fought the Law" (Sonny Curtis) - 3:54
8. "Coal not Dole" (Kay Sutcliffe) - 2:03
9. "New York Girls" (Trad.) - 5:04
10. "Johnny Mickey Barry's/Salmon Tails Down the Water" (Trad.) - 5:16
