= Holy Bandits =

Studio album by Oysterband
- Released: 1993
- Genre: British folk rock
- Length: 42:12
- Label: Cooking Vinyl
- Producer: Al Scott

Oysterband chronology
| Deserters (1992) | Holy Bandits (1993) | Trawler (1994) |

Holy Bandits is a 1993 album by British folk rock band Oysterband. The album features the original version of the song "When I'm Up (I Can't Get Down)", which became a top ten hit in Canada for the folk group Great Big Sea in 1997.

== Track listing ==
1. "When I'm Up, I Can't Get Down" (Telfer, Prosser, Jones) - 3:30
2. "The Road to Santiago" (Telfer, Prosser, Jones) - 3:29
3. "I Look for You" (Telfer, Prosser, Jones) - 4:04
4. "Gone West" (Telfer, Prosser, Jones) - 4:03
5. "We Shall Come Home" (Telfer) - 4:18
6. "Cry Cry" (Telfer, Prosser, Jones) - 3:34
7. "Here's to You" (Telfer, Prosser, Jones) - 3:15
8. "Moving On" (Telfer, Prosser, Jones) - 3:45
9. "Rambling Irishman" (Trad.) - 5:03
10. "A Fire Is Burning" (Telfer, Prosser, Jones) - 3:18
11. "Blood Wedding" (Telfer, Prosser, Jones) - 4:04
