= Meet You There (album) =

Studio album by Oysterband
- Released: 23 April 2007
- Recorded: 2006, Titley Village Hall, Herefordshire
- Genre: British folk rock
- Label: Westpark

Oysterband chronology
25 (2003)	Meet You There (2007)	The Oxford Girl and Other Stories (2008)

Professional ratings
Review scores
Source	Rating
AllMusic	link

Meet You There is an album by British folk rock group Oysterband, released in April 2007.

== Track listing ==
1. "Over the Water"
2. "Here Comes the Flood"
3. "Where the World Divides"
4. "Walking Down the Road with You"
5. "Bury Me Standing"
6. "Everything Must Go"
7. "Control"
8. "The Boy's Still Running"
9. "Someone Somewhere"
10. "Just One Life"
11. "Dancing as Fast as I Can"
