= Deserters (album) =

Studio album by Oysterband
- Released: 1992
- Recorded: 1991
- Genre: folk music
- Length: 48:23
- Label: Cooking Vinyl
- Producer: John Ravenhall

Oysterband chronology
| Freedom and Rain (1990) | Deserters (1992) | Holy Bandits (1993) |

Professional ratings
Review scores
| Source | Rating |
|---|---|
| Allmusic | 4/5 stars |

Deserters is an album by British folk music group Oysterband, released in 1992.

== Track listing ==
1. "All That Way for This" (Telfer, Jones) - 4:19
2. "The Deserter" (Telfer, Prosser, Jones) - 5:08
3. "Angels of the River" (Telfer, Jones) - 5:08
4. "We Could Leave Right Now" (Telfer, Prosser) - 3:22
5. "Elena's Shoes" (Burgess, Telfer, Prosser, Jones) - 4:56
6. "Granite Years" (Telfer, Jones) - 4:20
7. "Diamond for a Dime" (Telfer, Prosser, Jones) - 4:07
8. "Never Left" (Prosser, Jones) - 3:46
9. "Ship Sets Sail" (Telfer, Jones) - 3:26
10. "Fiddle or a Gun" (Telfer, Jones) - 4:09
11. "Bells of Rhymney" (Davies, Seeger) - 3:38
