= Eric Courchesne =

Autism researcher

- Education: University of California, Berkeley (BA, 1970); University of California, San Diego (PhD, 1975)
- Known for: Research on brain growth and cerebellar abnormalities in autism
- Awards: San Diego Health Hero Award
- Scientific career
- Fields: Neuroscience, autism research
- Institutions: University of California, San Diego

Eric Courchesne is an autism researcher and Professor of Neurosciences in University of California, San Diego School of Medicine and Director of the UCSD Autism Center located in La Jolla, California.

== Biography ==
Courchesne is a graduate of the University of California, where he obtained his BA in Zoology from UC Berkeley in 1970 and his PhD from UC San Diego in Neurosciences in 1975. He completed two post-doctoral appointments at Stanford University in the Departments of Psychiatry and Psychology. Courchesne contracted polio at age 3 and was initially unable to stand or walk. He has said in interviews contracting polio got him interested in neuroscience. Despite his contraction of polio, he went on to excel in gymnastics and was nominated for the Nissin Award in gymnastics, presented with the Jake Gimble Award for Scholastic and Athletic Achievement, and the National Collegiate Athletic Association (NCAA) Scholarship in the Neurosciences. He currently lives in San Diego, California with his wife, also an autism researcher, Karen Pierce, PhD, and their family. Scientifically, Courchesne’s contribution has led to over 180 publications on the topic of autism and has been included in national and international news coverage. He has received several awards such as the San Diego Health Hero Award. His research is supported by multiple organizations including the National Institute of Health, Autism Speaks, and the Simons Foundation.

== Scientific contributions ==
Courchesne made his initial major contribution to autism research in 1988 when he published one of the first neuroimaging studies of autism in the New England Journal of Medicine, demonstrating that autism involves developmental brain defects in the cerebellum and is definitively a neural biological disorder of early development and not a psychological disorder. A decade later Dr. Courchesne demonstrated that autism is also a disorder of brain growth. His 2001 Neurology paper on this topic is a landmark structural MRI paper and was republished on its 10th anniversary by Neurology because of its major impact on many subsequent studies aimed at understanding the anatomical developmental bases of autism. Courchesne’s body of research has led to the theory that autism is a disorder with a unique brain growth trajectory that includes early brain overgrowth during the toddler years, arrest of brain growth during childhood and possible degeneration during adulthood.

In 2011, Courchesne and his colleagues discovered a 67% excess of neurons in prefrontal cortex in young males with autism and demonstrated that this excess co-occurs with excess postmortem brain weight. This finding, published in JAMA, not only helped to explain why most of all autistic 2- to 16-year-old postmortem male brains exceed normal average, but that prenatal mechanisms regulating the number of neurons may be implicated in the etiology of autism. This study thus cast doubt on the idea that autism is caused by postnatal events such as vaccines.

== Impact on society ==
Courchesne began in the field of autism over 30 years ago, at a time when autism was poorly understood and awareness was low at the community level. Courchesne’s major findings of cerebellar abnormalities and dysregulation of brain growth have been replicated by many independent research groups and form the foundation of many theories and research studies on autism.

He continues to give lectures and keynote addresses at a variety of scientific conferences worldwide such as the International Meeting for Autism Research (IMFAR) and the Asia Pacific Autism Conference. He donates his time to the San Diego autism community and serves on the board of directors of the National Foundation for Autism Research (NFAR), an organization which supports local programs designed to improve the quality of life for individuals with autism and their families.

== Publications ==
- Courchesne E, Yeung-Courchesne R, Press GA, Hesselink JR, Jernigan TL. Hypoplasia of cerebellar vermal lobules VI and VII in autism. New England Journal of Medicine. 1988;318(21):1349-1354.
- Courchesne E, Karns C, Davis HR, et al. Unusual brain growth patterns in early life in patients with autistic disorder: An MRI study. Neurology. 2001;57:245-254.
- Courchesne E, Campbell K, Solso S. Brain growth across the life span in autism: age-specific changes in anatomical pathology. * Courchesne E, Campbell K, Solso S. Brain growth across the life span in autism: age-specific changes in anatomical pathology. * Courchesne E, Mouton PR, Calhoun ME, et al. Neuron number and size in prefrontal cortex of children with autism. JAMA. Nov 9 2011;306(18):2001-2010.
- Courchesne E, Webb SJ, Schumann CM. From toddlers to adults: The changing landscape of the brain in autism. In: Amaral DG, Dawson G, Geschwind DH, eds. Autism Spectrum Disorders. USA: Oxford University Press; 2011.
- Courchesne E, Pierce K, Schumann CM, et al. Mapping early brain development in autism. Neuron. Oct 25 2007;56(2):399-413.
- Courchesne E, Pierce K. Why the frontal cortex in autism might be talking only to itself: local over-connectivity but long-distance disconnection. Curr Opin Neurobiol. Apr 2005;15(2):225-230.
- Courchesne E, Pierce K. Brain overgrowth in autism during a critical time in development: implications for frontal pyramidal neuron and interneuron development and connectivity. Int J Dev Neurosci. Apr-May 2005;23(2-3):153-170.
- Courchesne E, Carper R, Akshoomoff N. Evidence of brain overgrowth in the first year of life in autism. Journal of the American Medical Association. 2003;290(3):337-344.
- Anagnostou E, Taylor MJ. Review of neuroimaging in autism spectrum disorders: what have we learned and where we go from here. Mol Autism. 2011;2(1):4.
- Chomiak T, Hu B. Alterations of neocortical development and maturation in autism: Insight from valproic acid exposure and animal models of autism. Neurotoxicol Teratol. Mar-Apr 2013;36:57-66.
- Flood ZC, Engel DL, Simon CC, et al. Brain growth trajectories in mouse strains with central and peripheral serotonin differences: relevance to autism models. Neuroscience. May 17, 2012;210:286-295.
- Hazlett HC, Poe MD, Gerig G, et al. Early brain overgrowth in autism associated with an increase in cortical surface area before age 2 years. Arch Gen Psychiatry. May 2011;68(5):467-476.
- Hazlett HC, Poe MD, Lightbody AA, et al. Trajectories of early brain volume development in fragile X syndrome and autism. J Am Acad Child Adolesc Psychiatry. Sep 2012;51(9):921-933.
- Wallace GL, Dankner N, Kenworthy L, Giedd JN, Martin A. Age-related temporal and parietal cortical thinning in autism spectrum disorders. Brain. Dec 2010;133(Pt 12):3745-3754.
- Klein S, Sharifi-Hannauer P, Martinez-Agosto JA. Macrocephaly as a clinical indicator of genetic subtypes in autism. Autism Res. Feb 2013;6(1):51-56.
- O'Roak BJ, Vives L, Fu W, et al. Multiplex targeted sequencing identifies recurrently mutated genes in autism spectrum disorders. Science. Dec 21 2012;338(6114):1619-1622.
- Wolff JJ, Gu H, Gerig G, et al. Differences in White Matter Fiber Tract Development Present From 6 to 24 Months in Infants With Autism. American Journal of Psychiatry. 20120224 2012;169(6):589-600.
- Chawarska K, Campbell D, Chen L, Shic F, Klin A, Chang J. Early generalized overgrowth in boys with autism. Arch Gen Psychiatry. Oct 2011;68(10):1021-1031.
- Stanfield AC, McIntosh AM, Spencer MD, Philip R, Gaur S, Lawrie SM. Towards a neuroanatomy of autism: a systematic review and meta-analysis of structural magnetic resonance imaging studies. Eur Psychiatry. Jun 2008;23(4):289-299.
- Vaccarino FM, Grigorenko EL, Smith KM, Stevens HE. Regulation of cerebral cortical size and neuron number by fibroblast growth factors: implications for autism. J Autism Dev Disord. Mar 2009;39(3):511-520.
- Stigler KA, McDonald BC, Anand A, Saykin AJ, McDougle CJ. Structural and functional magnetic resonance imaging of autism spectrum disorders. Brain Res. Mar 22 2011;1380:146-161.
- Lainhart JE, Lange N. Increased neuron number and head size in autism. JAMA. Nov 9 2011;306(18):2031-2032.
- Fatemi SH, Aldinger KA, Ashwood P, et al. Consensus paper: pathological role of the cerebellum in autism. Cerebellum. Sep 2012;11(3):777-807.
