= June Tabor =

British singer (born 1947)

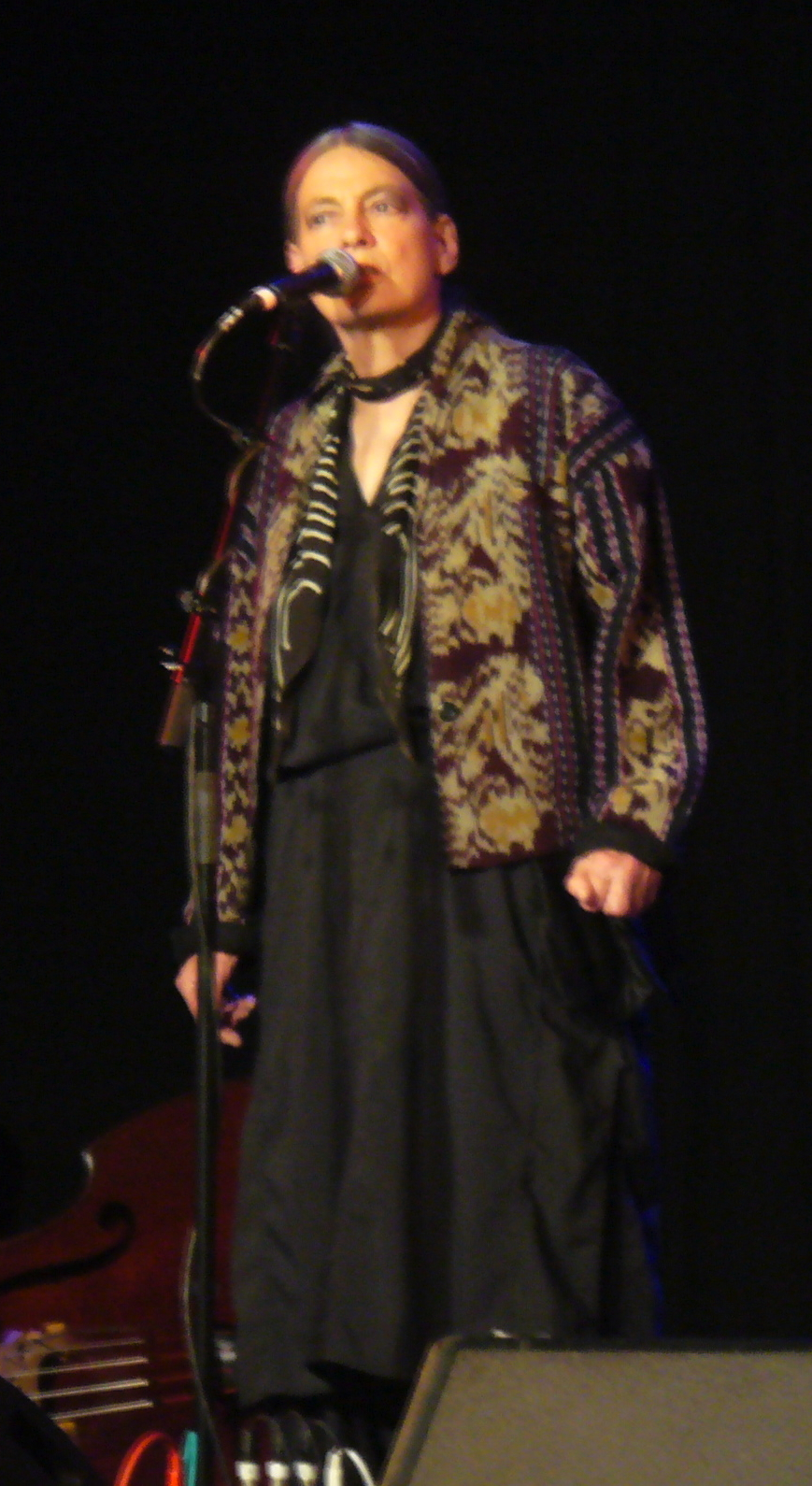
- Tabor performing at Sidmouth Folk Week in 2010

Background information
- Born: 31 December 1947 (age 78)
- Origin: Warwick, England
- Genre: English Folk
- Occupation: Singer
- Years active: 1972–present
- Labels: Topic; Rykodisc; Westpark
- Website: JuneTabor.co.uk

June Tabor (born 31 December 1947 in Warwick, England) is an English folk singer known for her solo work and her collaborations with Maddy Prior and with Oysterband.

== Early life ==
Tabor was born and grew up in Warwick, England. As a young woman of 18, she was inspired to sing by hearing Anne Briggs' EP The Hazards of Love in 1965.

"I went and locked myself in the bathroom for a fortnight and drove my mother mad. I learned the songs on that EP note for note, twiddle for twiddle. That's how I started singing. If I hadn't heard her I'd have probably done something entirely different."

Discussing in a 2008 interview how she developed her characteristic style, she said,

"I have no musical education whatsoever...I just learned the songs and copied the phrasing by playing those records ad nauseam, trying out both [Anne Briggs and Belle Stewart] singers' styles. Then I tried putting the two together, and missing a few bits out – and that's approximately what I've been doing ever since. It's also why I don't do singing workshops, because that's about as much as I can tell anyone."

Her earliest public performances were in the mid 1960s at the Heart of England Folk Club, in the Fox and Vivian pub in Leamington Spa.

She attended St Hugh's College, Oxford University and appeared on University Challenge in 1968, as captain of the college team. She joined the Heritage Society at Oxford University and sang with a group called Mistral.

After she performed at Sidmouth Folk Festival, she was booked in folk clubs and contributed to various recordings. One of her earliest was in 1972 on an anthology called Stagfolk Live. She is also featured on Rosie Hardman's Firebird (1972) and The First Folk Review Record (1974). At the time she was singing purely traditional, unaccompanied material.

In 1976 Tabor collaborated with Maddy Prior on the Silly Sisters album and tour, with a full band that included Nic Jones. It provided the launching pad that same year (1976) for her first album in her own right, Airs and Graces. She later joined again with Prior, this time using the name Silly Sisters for their duo.

Starting in 1977, Martin Simpson joined Tabor in the recording studio for three albums before he moved to the United States in 1987. (Since his return, Simpson has been a guest artist on albums released in the 2000s. After Simpson's departure, Tabor started working closely with pianist Huw Warren.

After working for decades as a singer, Tabor stopped performing professionally for a time. She made some guest appearances with Fairport Convention during this period. She also worked as a librarian. With her husband David Taylor (they have since divorced), she ran a restaurant called "Passepartout" in Penrith, Cumbria. In the 1990s she returned to music professionally.

== Solo work ==
In 1983, Tabor had sung the title song for the BBC TV series Spyship.

In 1990, Tabor recorded an album with the folk-rock band The Oyster Band titled Freedom and Rain. She went on tour with the Oyster Band, and the Rykodisc label published a limited-run promotional live album the following year. Many of her current fans first discovered her through this tour and album with the Oyster Band. In 1992, Elvis Costello wrote "All This Useless Beauty" specifically for Tabor, and she recorded it for the album Angel Tiger. Costello did not record it himself until 1996, on his album of the same name.

In 1997 she appeared in Ken Russell's television film, In Search of English Folk Song, which was broadcast on Channel 4.

Tim Winton, author of the novel Dirt Music (2001), which was shortlisted for the Booker Prize, made a selection of music to express the themes of the novel. The CD Dirt Music (2001) includes "He Fades Away" by Tabor, a tale of the slow death of a miner. (Tabor originally included this song on her 1994 CD Against the Streams.)

In 2002 Tabor performed at the "Passchendale Peace Concert" in Flanders, appearing with Coope Boyes and Simpson. On 30 June 2006 BBC Radio 3 broadcast "Night Waves" to commemorate the anniversary of the Battle of the Somme. It was broadcast live, with Tabor singing World War I-era songs. There was also a discussion with Michael Morpurgo and Kate Adie.

Tabor has also performed jazz and art song, generally with a sparse and sombre tone to it. Her 2003 album An Echo of Hooves marked a return to the traditional ballad form after she concentrated on other styles for several years. It was highly acclaimed. AllMusic described it as, "A stunning jewel in a remarkable career, and one of the best things Tabor's ever released." She next released Always (2005), a boxed set of four CDs that span her career and contain rare recordings.

== Collaborations and recent developments ==
Her collaboration with Martin Simpson on their 1980 album "A Cut Above" was widely praised. The BBC's Mike Harding said: "When you get two wonderful musicians together the end result is not always the sum of the parts ... In this case they obviously pushed each other on to greater things because the end result is magnificent."

On 24 October 2003 Tabor appeared on Later... with Jools Holland (BBC TV), singing "Hughie Graeme". This was later issued as part of a compilation DVD from the series.

Folk Britannia was the name of a concert at the Barbican centre, and a related TV mini-series (February 2006, repeated in October). She sang "Fair Margaret and Sweet William" at the Barbican, under the heading "Daughters of Albion". Tabor contributed one song to Ashley Hutchings' project Street Cries (2001) and one to a collection of folk musicians singing songs by the Beatles – Rubber Folk (2006). She chose to sing Lennon's "In My Life" a cappella.

Tabor is often experimental but avoids modernism. For example, she frequently sings traditional songs with a piano accompaniment. On the album Singing The Storm (1996), she sings to the accompaniment of Savourna Stevenson's harp, and Danny Thompson's bass. In May 2004 she performed as part of "The Big Session" and sang an adaptation of "Love Will Tear Us Apart" as a duet with John Jones of Oysterband. In 1992, The Wire voted Tabor's "Queen Among the Heather" as one of the "Top 50 Rhythms of all Time".

Tabor has also performed comic work with Les Barker's The Mrs Ackroyd Band. So far Tabor has performed on three of their albums, the 1990 Oranges and Lemmings (singing "The Trains of Waterloo", a parody of the folk song "The Plains of Waterloo" in a duet with Martin Carthy), the 1994 Gnus and Roses (singing "The January June", a send-up of her perceived sombre character), and the 2003 Yelp! (singing "There's a Hole in my Bodhran", to the tune of "There's a Hole in my Bucket"). She sang two songs on Beat The Retreat, a tribute to Richard Thompson.

Topic Records issued a 70-year anniversary boxed set Three Score and Ten; in the accompanying book it lists Tabor's Aqaba as one of their classic albums. Three tracks from it are included in the compilation. "A Place Called England"' from A Quiet Eye is track eight on the second CD, and two songs appear on the seventh CD: "While Gamekeepers Lie Sleeping" from Airs & Graces is track two, and "Hedger and Ditcher" from the Silly Sisters album No More To The Dance is track seventeen.

== Awards ==
- In 2004 she was named Folk Singer of the Year at the BBC Radio 2 Folk Awards.
- In 2011 Ragged Kingdom was named "Album of the Year" in the fRoots critics poll.
- In 2012 Folk Singer of the Year at the BBC Radio 2 Folk Awards.

== Discography ==
=== With Maddy Prior ===
- Silly Sisters (1976)
- No More to the Dance (1988) (as The Silly Sisters)

=== Solo albums ===
- Airs and Graces (1976) (including "And the Band Played Waltzing Matilda" and "Reynardine")
- Ashes and Diamonds (1977) (including "No Man's Land")
- A Cut Above (1980), credited jointly with Martin Simpson
- Abyssinians (1983)
- The Peel Sessions (1986) – recorded January 1977
- Aqaba (1988)
- Some Other Time (1989)
- Angel Tiger (1992)
- Against the Streams (1994)
- Singing the Storm (1996) – with Savourna Stevenson and Danny Thompson
- Aleyn (1997)
- On Air (1998)
- Reflections (1999) 3-CD box set. Contains June's first three solo albums: Airs & Graces, Ashes & Diamonds, A Cut Above
- A Quiet Eye (1999)
- Rosa Mundi (2001)
- An Echo of Hooves (2003)
- At the Wood's Heart (2005)
- Apples (2007)
- Ashore (2011)

=== Collaborations with Oysterband ===
- Freedom and Rain (1990)
- June Tabor and the Oyster Band Tour '91 Sampler (1991) – eight-song promotional disc.
- Ragged Kingdom (Westpark Music, 2011)
- Fire & Fleet, A Tour Memento (2019) - only available at gigs and the website.

=== Collaborations with Iain Ballamy and Huw Warren ===
- Quercus (ECM Records, 2013)
- Nightfall (ECM Records, 2017)

=== Collaboration with Flowers and Frolics ===
- Bees on Horseback (1977)

=== Collaboration with Fairport Convention ===
- In Real Time (1987) (video release of that year's Cropredy Festival, not the similarly titled album).
- The Third Leg (1990)

=== Collaborations with the Mrs Ackroyd Band ===
- The Stones of Callanish (1989)
- Oranges and Lemmings (1990)
- Some Love (1992)
- Gnus and Roses (1994)
- The Wings of Butterflies (1999)
- Airs of the Dog (2001)
- Yelp! (2003)
- Guide Cats for the Blind (2004)

=== With Savourna Stevenson and Danny Thompson ===
- Singing the Storm (1996)

=== With Peter Bellamy and others ===
- The Transports (1977) (June sings the role of The Mother)

=== Collections ===
- Anthology (1993)
- The Definitive Collection (2003)
- Always (2005) 4-CD box set and booklet – retrospective, with many rarities (67 tracks in total).
- An Introduction to June Tabor (2018)
