= Here I Stand (Oysterband album) =

Studio album by Oysterband
- Released: 3 August 1999
- Recorded: 1999
- Genre: Celtic rock, folk rock, indie rock, alternative rock
- Length: 58:50
- Label: Running Man

Oysterband chronology
Deep Dark Ocean (1997)	Here I Stand (1999)	Granite Years (2000)

Here I Stand is a 1999 album by British folk-rock band Oysterband. It is their 17th studio album.

Released on 3 August 1999, the album's much praised lyrics deal with topics such as globalisation, political, and philosophical insights. The album guest features Canadian folk rock band Great Big Sea and British punk pop band Chumbawamba.

== History ==
Here I Stand, co-produced with Alaric Neville, released during the last summer of the 20th Century, created another landmark with the formation of their own label Running Man. Sales proved the Oysters' following were not fazed by the album's "provocative (read "risky") mix of austerity, improvisation, tradition and outright pop; which proved surprisingly radio-friendly and promises well for the label's future."

== Reception ==
Professional ratings
Review scores
Source	Rating
Allmusic	4.5/5 stars

The reception for the album was very positive. FAME said of the album "with the opening chords of On the Edge it is clear these guys are fresh and unique. Their anthemic sing-along against the corporatisation of the world won't leave your head. In fact, there are aspects of this album that make it the strongest I have heard in a quite some time. Merging traditional folk music topics and instrumentation, with modern rock sensibilities, Oysterband creates a lively album that the listener can't help but dance to.

"This Is the Voice" was released as a single in the UK and "On the Edge" was released as a single in Germany.

== Track listing ==
1. "On the Edge" (John Jones, Alan Prosser) - 4:25
2. "This Is the Voice" (Chopper, Jones, Prosser, Ian Telfer) - 4:55
3. "In Your Eyes" (Chopper, Jones, Alaric Neville, Lee Partis, Prosser, Telfer) - 4:16
4. "Street of Dreams" (Jones, Prosser, Telfer) - 4:45
5. "Ways of Holding On" (Chopper, Jones, Neville, Partis, Prosser, Telfer) - 5:08
6. "A Time of Her Own" (Neville, Prosser, Jones) - 2:49
7. "After Rain" (Jones, Prosser, Telfer) - 4:21
8. "I Know It's Mine" (Chopper, Jones, Prosser, Telfer) - 4:06
9. "Someone You Might Have Been" (Chopper, Jones, Partis, Prosser, Telfer) - 4:08
10. "Kantele" (Chopper, Prosser) - 0:53
11. "She's Moved On" (Jones, Telfer) - 3:29
12. "And As for You" (Jones, Prosser, Telfer) - 3:39
13. "Cello Drop" (Gustav Holst, Chopper, Partis, Prosser) - 2:24
14. "Jump Through the Fire" (Jones, Prosser, Telfer) - 3:40
15. "This Town" (Chopper, Prosser, Telfer) - 3:51
16. "A Last Glass" (Chopper, Prosser, Telfer) - 2:01
