= Ragged Kingdom =

Studio album by June Tabor and Oysterband
- Released: 19 September 2011
- Recorded: 2011
- Genres: Folk, folk rock
- Length: 46:07
- Label: Topic (UK/Europe)

Professional ratings
Review scores
Source	Rating
AllMusic	4/5 stars
The Guardian	5/5 stars

Ragged Kingdom is a 2011 album by June Tabor and Oysterband. Tabor and Oysterband had collaborated previously on the 1990 album Freedom and Rain. The majority of the tracks are interpretations of traditional folk songs but also includes covers of Joy Division's "Love Will Tear Us Apart", Bob Dylan's "Seven Curses" PJ Harvey's "That Was My Veil" and the Dan Penn & Chips Moman soul standard "Dark End of the Street".

The album was warmly received with Robin Denselow of The Guardian giving it a 5 star review. The album went on to top fRoots magazine year end poll as best album of 2011.

== Track listing ==
1. Bonny Bunch of Roses
2. That Was My Veil
3. Son David
4. Love Will Tear Us Apart
5. (When I Was No but) Sweet Sixteen
6. Judas (Was a Red-headed Man)
7. If My Love Loves Me
8. Hills of Shiloh
9. Fountains Flowing
10. The Leaves of Life
11. Seven Curses
12. Dark End of the Street

== Personnel ==
- June Tabor - vocals
- John Jones - melodeon, vocals
- Alan Prosser - fiddle, guitar, kantele, vocals
- Ray Cooper - cello, bass guitar, harmonium, mandolin, vocals
- Al Scott - bass guitar, mandola
- Ian Telfer - fiddle
- Dil Davies - drums

== Charts ==
Chart performance for Ragged Kingdom
Chart (2011)	Peak position
UK Albums (Official Charts)	59
UK Independent Albums (Official Charts)	9
