= Oysterband =

British folk rock band

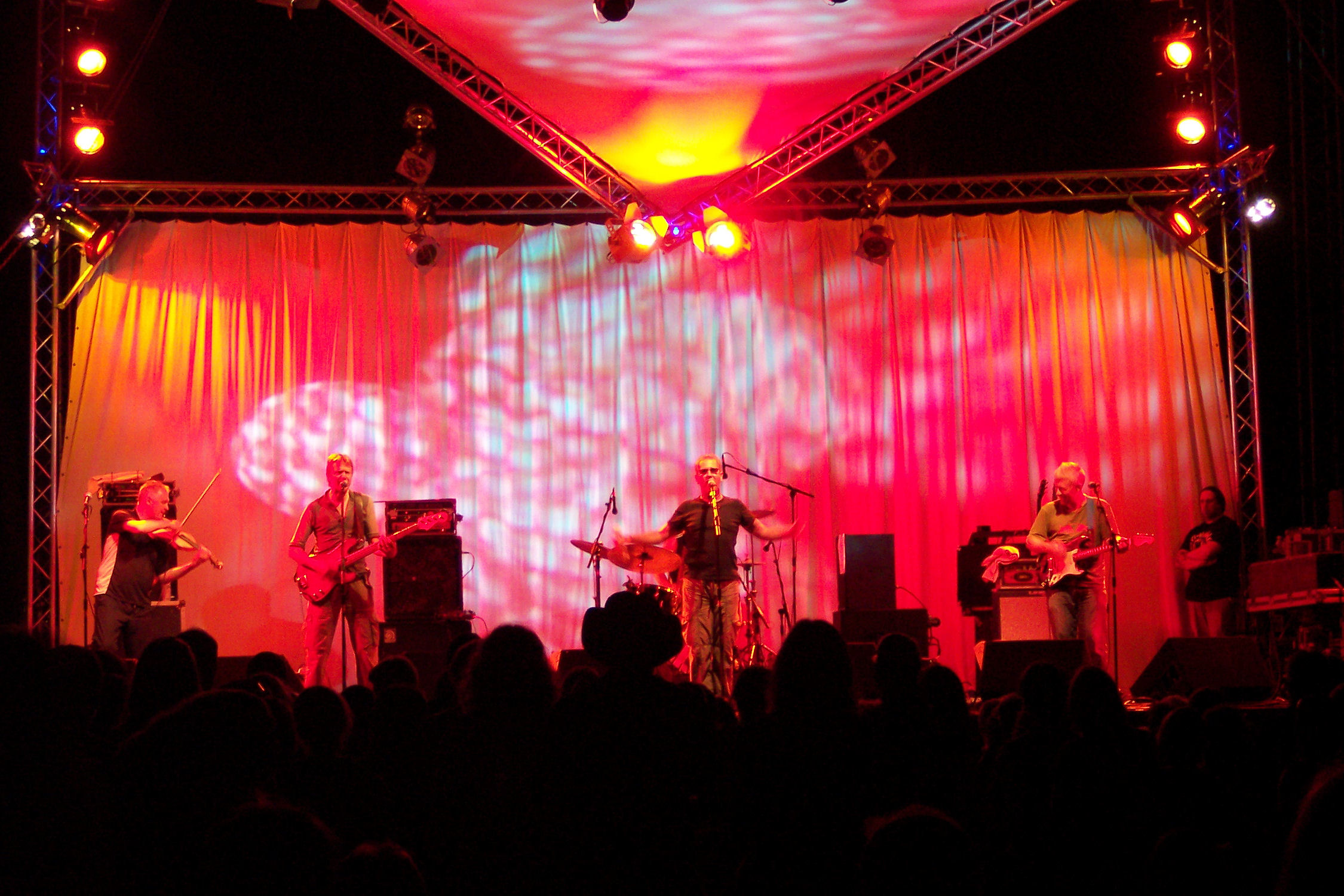
- Oysterband headlining the 2006 Wickham Festival

Background information
- Origin: Kent, England
- Genres: British folk rock, folk punk
- Years active: 1976–present
- Members: Alan Prosser; Ian Telfer; John Jones; Sean Randle; Al Scott; Adrian Oxaal
- Past members: Will Ward; Cathy Lesurf; Chris Taylor; Ian Kearey; Chris Wood; Russell Lax; Lee Partis; Ray Cooper AKA Chopper; Dilwyn Davies; Pete Flood
- Website: www.oysterband.co.uk

Oysterband (originally The Oyster Band) are a British folk rock and folk punk band formed in Canterbury around 1976. The band retired as a touring act in 2025 with final festival shows at Shrewsbury and Tønder.

== History ==
=== Early history ===
The band formed in parallel to Fiddler's Dram, and under the name "Oyster Ceilidh Band" played purely as a dance band at first. The name Oyster comes from the group's early association with the coastal town of Whitstable, Kent, known for the quality of its oysters. Their first album, released under the Oyster Ceilidh Band name, was Jack's Alive (1980) on the Dingles record label. Subsequent albums, as "Oyster Band" (sometimes "The Oyster Band") were released on the band's own Pukka Music label: English Rock 'n' Roll: The Early Years 1800–1850 and Lie Back and Think of England, followed by 20 Golden Tie-Slackeners and Liberty Hall.

The line-up of the band changed over these albums. The first recorded line-up was:

- Cathy Lesurf – vocals;
- John Jones – melodeon, vocals;
- Alan Prosser – guitars, violin;
- Chris Taylor – guitar, bouzouki, harmonica, one-row melodeon, mandola;
- Ian Telfer – violin, English concertina, saxophone;
- Chris Wood – bass guitar;
- Will Ward – bassoon, recorders, crumhorn, keyboards

When Chris Wood left the band to go travelling in Canada, he was replaced on bass guitar by returning founder member Ian Kearey. Cathy Lesurf subsequently left to join Ashley Hutchings' Albion Band, and Will Ward also departed so that by the time they recorded Lie Back and Think of England, the personnel had settled down to John Jones, Ian Kearey, Alan Prosser, Chris Taylor and Ian Telfer. For the album Step Outside they added Russell Lax on drums. Step Outside mixed self-penned songs, often with a political theme, with reworkings of traditional standards such as "Hal-an-Tow".

=== Later history ===
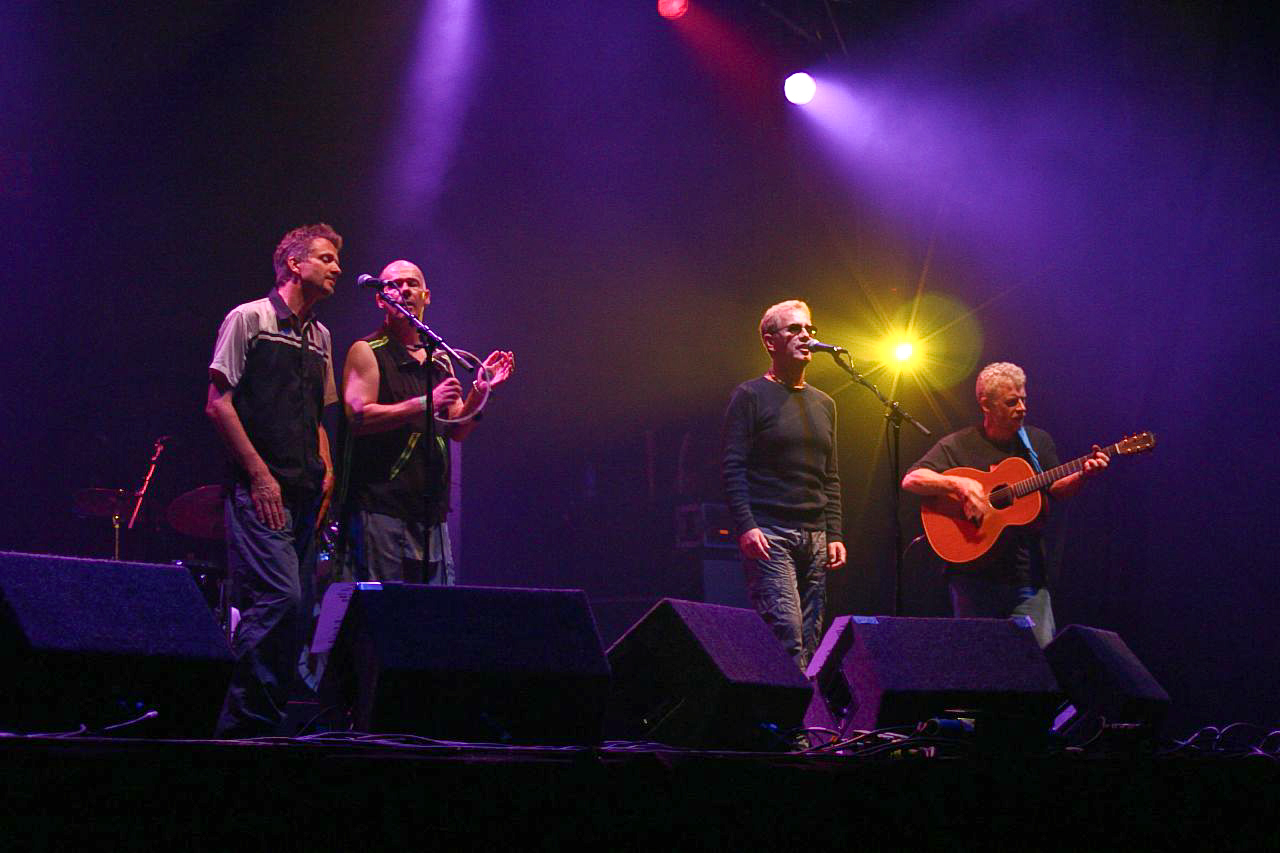
Oysterband, Cropredy Festival, Oxfordshire, 12 August 2004

After the 1987 release Wide Blue Yonder Kearey left the band to be replaced by Chopper (real name Ray Cooper). Subsequent albums included Ride, Little Rock to Leipzig and the June Tabor collaboration Freedom and Rain. Following this the band changed its name to Oysterband. Drummer Lee Partis (who for several years was billed only by his forename) replaced Russell Lax for 1992's Deserters before Holy Bandits in 1993 propelled the band to the forefront of a booming folk rock scene alongside bands such as The Levellers.

In the 1990s, the band adopted a more overtly political stance, recording the harder The Shouting End of Life and collaborating with Chumbawamba to record "Farewell to the Crown", released as the B-side of the "Tubthumping" single. But recent releases Deep Dark Ocean, Here I Stand, Rise Above and Meet You There have seen the band return to a softer, more melodic sound, while recent tours under the banner The Big Session have seen the band offer exposure to several young, emerging folk musicians like Dan Donnelly, The Handsome Family, as well as veterans such as June Tabor. James O'Grady (Uilleann pipes, fiddle, flute, vocals) regularly appeared on the Oysters' albums and tours in the last few years.

John Jones, James O'Grady and Ian Telfer provided vocals and instrumentation on Chumbawamba's album A Singsong and a Scrap, and Oysterband provided vocals for the song "Hull or Hell" on The Boy Bands Have Won.

In 2007, long-standing drummer Lee Partis took a break to concentrate on his work as a psychotherapist, counselling in prisons. In August 2008, he confirmed he would be leaving the band permanently. The band then appointed Dilwyn Davies as replacement drummer.

Following a 30th anniversary concert in December 2008 the band took a six-month sabbatical, during which John Jones and Chopper both made solo albums.

The band returned to the studio in 2011, teaming up once again with June Tabor and releasing Ragged Kingdom in September at a sell-out concert at London's Queen Elizabeth Hall. For at least some dates on the Ragged Kingdom tour, they were also joined on bass and guitar by Al Scott, who produced the album. On 8 February 2012, June Tabor and Oysterband won Best Traditional Song, Best Album and Best Group at the BBC Radio 2 Folk Awards for Ragged Kingdom, with Tabor also winning Folk Singer of the Year.

Ray Cooper announced in December 2012 that he would leave the band at the end of the Ragged Kingdom tour in February 2013, to pursue a solo career. Adrian Oxaal, formerly of rock band James, replaced him on a few gigs late in 2012, and took over in 2013, although it was unclear whether he would become a full-time member of Oysterband. The band also featured Al Scott on bass at some gigs and he became a permanent member. Pete Flood, formerly of Bellowhead replaced Davies on drums before Sean Randle took over the sticks.

On 5 February 2024, John Jones, Alan Prosser and Ian Telfer announced on Facebook that Oysterband will be retiring as a touring band, they had a 'long, long goodbye’ tour across the UK and Europe with the last gigs and festivals in 2025.

=== Current line-up ===
- John Jones – melodeon, lead vocals
- Alan Prosser – guitars, vocals
- Ian Telfer – violin, keyboard, vocals
- Sean Randle – drums, percussion, vocals
- Al Scott – bass guitar, mandolin, vocals
- Adrian Oxaal – cello, electric guitar, bass guitar, vocals

== Discography ==
=== Studio albums ===
As Oyster Ceilidh Band

- Jack's Alive – 1980

As Oyster Band

- English Rock 'n' Roll: The Early Years 1800–1850 – 1982
- Lie Back and Think of England (Pukka Records YOP 04, 1983)
- 20 Golden Tie-Slackeners – 1984
- Liberty Hall (Pukka Records YOP 07, 1985)
- Step Outside – 1986
- Wide Blue Yonder – 1987
- Ride (Cooking Vinyl COOK 020, 1989)
- Love Vigilantes – 1989 (10 inch EP on pink vinyl, cover is a 6-fold poster)
- Little Rock to Leipzig - 1990
- Freedom and Rain – 1990 (collaboration with June Tabor)

As Oysterband

- Deserters – 1992
- Holy Bandits – 1993
- Trawler – 1994
- The Shouting End of Life – 1995
- Deep Dark Ocean – 1997
- Here I Stand – 1999
- Rise Above – 2002
- 25 – 2003
- Meet You There – 2007
- The Oxford Girl and Other Stories – 2008
- Ragged Kingdom (Topic Records, 2011; vinyl issue on Stamford Audio STAMP 1008) (collaboration with June Tabor, credited to June Tabor & Oysterband)
- Diamonds on the Water – 2014
- Read the Sky - 2022

=== Live albums ===
- Little Rock to Leipzig – 1990 (partially live)
- Alive and Shouting – 1996
- Alive and Acoustic – 1998
- 25th Anniversary Concert – DVD – 2004
- Northern Light – 2006
- Fire and Fleet – 2019 (collaboration with June Tabor, partially live)

=== Compilation albums ===
- The Rough Guide to World Music – 1994 (contributing the track "When I'm Up I Can't Get Down")
- The Rough Guide to English Roots Music – 1998 (contributing the track "Sail on By")
- Pearls from the Oysters – 1998 (taking tracks from Step Outside, Wide Blue Yonder, Ride and Little Rock to Leipzig)
- Granite Years (The Best of Oysterband 1986–1997) – 2000, double album
- This House Will Stand (The Best Of Oysterband 1998–2015) – 2016, double album with "The Work Of My Own Two Hands" plus alternate versions and demos
