= British folk rock =

Form of folk rock pioneered in England

- Stylistic origins: Rock music; folk music; contemporary folk; folk rock
- Cultural origins: 1960s, United Kingdom

Subgenres
- Medieval folk rock

Fusion genres
- Celtic rock; folk punk; folk metal

British folk rock is a form of folk rock which developed in the United Kingdom from the mid 1960s, and was at its most significant in the 1970s. Though the merging of folk and rock music came from several sources, it is widely regarded that the success of "The House of the Rising Sun" by British band the Animals in 1964 was a catalyst, prompting Bob Dylan to "go electric", in which, like the Animals, he brought folk and rock music together, from which other musicians followed. In the same year, the Beatles began incorporating overt folk influences into their music, most noticeably on their Beatles for Sale album. The Beatles and other British Invasion bands, in turn, influenced the American band the Byrds, who released their recording of Dylan's "Mr. Tambourine Man" in April 1965, setting off the mid-1960s American folk rock movement. A number of British groups, usually those associated with the British folk revival, moved into folk rock in the mid-1960s, including the Strawbs, Pentangle, and Fairport Convention.

British folk rock was taken up and developed in the surrounding Celtic cultures of Brittany, Ireland, Scotland, Wales and the Isle of Man, to produce Celtic rock and its derivatives, and has been influential in countries with close cultural connections to Britain. It gave rise to the genre of folk punk. By the 1980s the genre was in steep decline in popularity, but survived and revived in significance, partly merging with the rock music and folk music cultures from which it originated. Some commentators have found a distinction in some British folk rock, where the musicians are playing traditional folk music with electric instruments rather than merging rock and folk music, and they distinguish this form of playing by calling it "electric folk".

== History ==
=== Origins ===
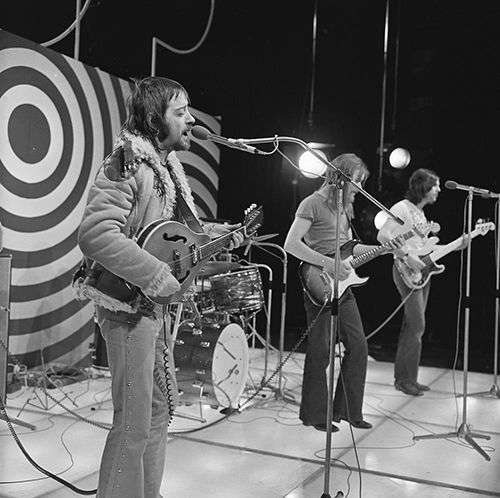
Fairport Convention in a Dutch television show in 1972

Though the merging of folk and rock music came from several sources, it is widely regarded that the success of "The House of the Rising Sun" by British band the Animals in 1964 was a catalyst, prompting Bob Dylan to go electric. In the same year, the Beatles began incorporating overt folk influences into their music, most noticeably on the song "I'm a Loser" from their Beatles for Sale album. The Beatles and other British Invasion bands, in turn, influenced the Californian band the Byrds, who began playing folk-influenced material and Bob Dylan compositions with rock instrumentation. The Byrds' recording of Dylan's "Mr. Tambourine Man" was released in April 1965 and reached #1 on the U.S. and UK singles charts, setting off the mid-1960s folk rock movement. The Beatles' late 1965 album, Rubber Soul, contained a number of songs influenced by the American folk rock boom, such as "Nowhere Man" and "If I Needed Someone". During this period, a number of electric bands began to play rock versions of folk songs and folk musicians used electric musical instruments to play their own songs, including Dylan at the Newport Folk Festival in the summer of 1965.

Folk rock became an important genre among emerging English bands, particularly those in the London club scene towards the end of the 1960s. The skiffle movement, to which many English musicians, including the Beatles, owed their origins as performers, meant that they were already familiar with American folk music As they emulated the guitar and drum based format that had crystallised as the norm for rock music, these groups often turned to American folk and folk rock as the focus of their sound and inspiration. Among these groups from 1967 were Fairport Convention, who had enjoyed some modest mainstream success with three albums of material that was largely American in origin or style, before a radical change of direction in 1969 with their album Liege & Lief, which came out of the encounter between American inspired folk rock and the products of the English folk revival.

The first English folk music revival had seen a huge effort to record and archive traditional English music by figures such as Cecil Sharp and Vaughan Williams in the late 19th and early 20th centuries. The second revival in the period after the Second World War, built on this work and followed a similar movement in America, to which it was connected by individuals like Alan Lomax, who had fled to England in the era of McCarthyism. Like the American revival, it was often overtly left wing in its politics, but, led by such figures as Ewan MacColl and A. L. Lloyd from the early 1950s, it also attempted to produce a distinctively English music that was an alternative to the American dominance of popular culture, which was, as they saw it, displacing the traditional music of an increasingly urbanised and industrialised working class. Most important among their responses were the foundation of folk clubs in major towns, starting with London where MacColl began the Ballads and Blues Club in 1953. These clubs were usually urban in location, but the songs sung in them often hearkened back to a rural pre-industrial past. In many ways this was the adoption of abandoned popular music by the middle classes. By the mid-1960s there were probably over 300 folk clubs in Britain, providing an important circuit for acts that performed traditional songs and tunes acoustically, where they could sustain a living by playing to a small but committed audience. This meant that there were, by the later 1960s, a group of performers with musical skill and knowledge of a wide variety of traditional songs and tunes.

A number of groups who were part of the folk revival experimented with electrification in the mid-1960s. These included the unrecorded efforts of Sweeney's Men from Ireland, the jazz folk group Pentangle, who moved from purely acoustic instrumentation to introducing electric guitar on their later albums, Eclection, who released one album in 1968, and the Strawbs who developed from a bluegrass band into a "progressive Byrds" band by 1967. However, none provided a sustained or much emulated effort in this direction. Also products of the folk club circuit were Sandy Denny who joined Fairport Convention as a singer in 1968 and Dave Swarbrick, a fiddle player and session musician who reacted positively to the electric music he encountered while working with Fairport in 1969. The result was an extended interpretation of the song "A Sailor's Life", which was released on their album Unhalfbricking. This encounter sparked the interest of Ashley Hutchings who began research in the English Folk Dance and Song Society's library; the result was the band's seminal Liege & Lief (1969) which combined traditional songs and tunes with some written by members of the band in a similar style, all played on a combination of electric instruments including Swarbrick's amplified fiddle, setting the template for British folk rock.

=== Heyday 1969–76 ===
The rapid expansion of British folk rock that followed in the wake of Liege & Lief in the 1970s came mainly from three sources. First were existing folk performers who now 'electrified', including Mr. Fox, formed around the acoustic duo Bob and Carole Pegg, and Pentangle, who having previously recorded largely without electrification, produced a fourth album of entirely traditional material, Cruel Sister, in 1970, performed very much in the British folk rock mould. Similarly, Swarbrick's former playing partner, Martin Carthy, joined Steeleye Span in 1971 to the astonishment of many in the folk music world. Five Hand Reel, a band formed out of the remnants of Spencer's Feat, proved to be one of the more successful and influential folk rock bands. Releasing four albums with Topic/RCA records, they were popular in Europe, where they gave most of their performances. Unlike the 'English' genre of folk tunes prevalent in the other popular bands, Five Hand Reel performed Scots and Irish songs and won Melody Maker's "Folk Album of the Year" in 1975.

Second were groupings created directly by the members or former members of Fairport Convention, which can be seen as the nexus from which a family of organisations or performers emerged. Sandy Denny's short-lived group Fotheringay was one of these and Steeleye Span was another, the latter formed as a traditionally focussed, but essentially electric outfit, by Ashley Hutchings after his departure from Fairport in late 1969. He left Steeleye Span after three albums and eventually formed the Albion Country Band, later the Albion Band, which broke up in 2002. The Albion Band in turn spawned one of the most musically talented British folk rock groups of the 1980s Home Service, whose third album Alright Jack (1985) is often seen as representing another artistic highpoint for the genre.

A much smaller group of English bands were formed in emulation of existing folk rock bands. Most often the model seems to have been Steeleye Span, as it was for the Cambridge group Spriguns of Tolgus, the Northumbrian band Hedgehog Pie and the Oyster Band, who started as the unpromising Fiddler's Dram in 1978. Fiddler's Dram were often dismissed as "one hit wonders" for their single "Day Trip to Bangor", which peaked at no 3 in the UK and for their clear status as "Steeleye Span soundalikes". What was remarkable is that they proved to have a singer-songwriter of genuine talent in Cathy Lesurf, and after she had left for the Albion Band in 1980 the remaining members regrouped as the Oyster Band (latterly Oysterband), an increasingly heavy and politically aware folk rock unit who produced some of the best work in the genre in the 1980s and 1990s, merging into the developing folk punk and independent scenes.

=== Decline and survival 1977–85 ===
For a time electric folk threatened to break through to the mainstream, peaking in the early-to-mid-1970s when Steeleye Span had a Christmas Top 20 hit single ("Gaudete") in 1973 and another Top 5 hit in 1975 ("All Around My Hat"). The album of the same name was their most commercially successful, reaching no. 5 in the UK album chart in the same year. By comparison Fairport Convention released few singles and made very little impact on the British charts, although their albums sold well in the early 1970s. Liege & Lief reached no. 17 in 1969 and a later album, Angel Delight made the Top 10 in 1971. Most of their career, from that point until they initially disbanded in 1979, was one of declining profile and sales.

The same was generally true of other electric folk outfits. The late 1970s and early 1980s were a time to either abandon the genre or fight a losing struggle for survival. The reason is often said to be the rise of punk rock, which reached a peak in 1977. It changed the ethos of popular music, overturning certainties about musicianship and songwriting and had no greater target than the old fashioned folk musicians of the preceding generation. All popular music trends have a generational problem as their audiences grow and might not be replaced, but for folk rock the discontinuity was very acute. One result was a further hybridisation with the development of folk punk among younger acts in the later 1970s, some of which, like the Pogues and The Levellers, achieved some mainstream success. The early 1980s were the nadir of electric folk, when, in contrast to the mid-1970s only the Albion Band (with the associated Home Service) and the Oysterband remained as major exponents of the genre and this was perhaps their least productive period, although in part, at least, this was due to lack of major record company interest in the genre. Folk-rock has never been a major revenue earner for record companies, even in its 1970s heyday. As a consequence of this lack of interest the three Home Service albums released between 1984 and 1986 came out on three different independent labels (Jigsaw, Coda and Making Waves), which further dented their commercial prospects.

=== Resurgence 1985–present ===
In the later 1980s, things began to look much more positive for the genre. Despite formally disbanding in 1979, Fairport Convention staged what were initially called "reunion" concerts annually from 1980, which eventually evolved into the Cropredy Festival ("Fairport's Cropredy Convention") which remains (in 2022) a mainstay of the U.K. summer festival calendar and regularly attracts up to 20,000 attendees, by no means all of whom are Fairport Convention fans. When the band reformed in 1985 they were able to embark on increasingly lengthy and successful tours and produce a series of highly regarded albums. The reason for this recording revival was partly because they abandoned the mainstream record business, instead focusing on growing their own audience and producing records independently on their own labels (Woodworm and Matty Grooves), ironically a development which the punk and post-punk era had helped to accelerate.

The Albion Band survived initially by becoming involved in theatre productions and, from 1993, by downsizing to a smaller acoustic outfit that could play the still extensive network of folk clubs and other smaller venues. This move was also significant in indicating the way in which electric folk personnel had become assimilated into the folk revival. Almost all the members of Fairport Convention have toured the folk club circuit solo or in smaller units and the line up at Cropredy includes as many acoustic acts as electric.

In 1980, Steeleye Span's Sails of Silver took a decisive move away from traditional songs. It was a commercial failure and their last album for six years as they became a part-time touring band. However, in 1986 they produced Back in Line and since then, despite several line-up changes, they have continued to perform and have recorded eight more albums.

Some bands like Stone Angel and Jack the Lad, who had disbanded in the 1970s, had reformed and resumed a recording or touring career.

=== Impact on English rock music ===
Hard rock and progressive rock bands such as Led Zeppelin and Jethro Tull incorporated elements of folk music in their music, though they are not considered part of the folk rock movement. Led Zeppelin had shared a stage with Fairport Convention at the Bath Festival of Blues and Progressive Music in 1970. Robert Plant and Jimmy Page's interest in the genre was first evident in the recording of "Gallows Pole" a traditional ballad on Led Zeppelin III (1970), which stands out among their usual output of blues orientated rock. At this time they also wrote the ballad "Poor Tom" which would surface on Coda (1982). It is more subtly manifested in their most famous album Led Zeppelin IV (1971), which contained elements of both American folk rock and English electric folk on 'Stairway to Heaven' and most obviously on 'The Battle of Evermore', on which Sandy Denny had the distinction of being the only person ever to be invited to do guest vocals on a Led Zeppelin album. These influences would also appear on later albums, but reduced as the band returned to a hard rock sound from Presence (1976) onwards.

As Led Zeppelin moved away from electric folk, another long term survivor of the British blues movement, Jethro Tull, began to move towards it. Ian Anderson had produced Steeleye Span's album Now We Are Six in 1974 and first demonstrated a clear interest in more traditional sounds on Minstrel in the Gallery (1975), but it was in 1977 with the release of Songs from the Wood (1977) that Anderson took the band into electric folk territory. All the songs on the album focused on rural life and, in addition to the normal electronic instruments and flute of the band, used mandolin, lute and a pipe organ. Two tracks, 'Hunting Girl' and particularly 'Velvet Green' followed the form of erotic folk ballads, much suited to Anderson's song writing interests. Two more albums followed in a similar vein: Heavy Horses (1978) and Stormwatch (1979) to form a loose folk rock trilogy, before Anderson moved into more electronic territory at the beginning of the 1980s. Ironically it was at this point that Dave Pegg of Fairport Convention would be the first of several members of that band to join Jethro Tull.

=== Electric and progressive folk ===
Progressive folk developed in Britain in the mid-1960s partly as an attempt to elevate the artistic quality of the folk genre, but also as a response to diverse influences, often combining acoustic folk instruments with jazz, blues and world music. As a result, it was already established in Britain, albeit a difficult to define and varied subgenre, before the advent of electric folk at the end of the 1960s. It can be seen as including performers such as Donovan, the Incredible String Band, Pentangle, Strawbs, Nick Drake, Roy Harper, John Martyn and the original Tyrannosaurus Rex. Some of this, particularly the Incredible String Band, has been seen as developing into the further subgenre of psych or psychedelic folk.

The advent of electric folk had profound effects on this developing strand of the folk genre. First, many existing acts, having avoided the American model of folk rock electrification from about 1965 now adopted it, most obviously Pentangle, Strawbs and acoustic duo Tyrannosaurus Rex which became the electric combo T-Rex. It also pushed progressive folk towards more traditional material. Acoustic performers Dando Shaft and Amazing Blondel, both beginning about this time, are examples of this trend.

Examples of bands that remained firmly on the border between progressive folk and progressive rock are the short lived Comus and, more successfully, Renaissance, who combined folk and rock with elements of classical music.

While progressive folk as a genre continued into the late 1960s, it was overshadowed by electric folk and progressive rock, arguably, later to emerge in a new form.

== Derivatives ==
=== Medieval folk rock ===
From about 1970 a number of performers inspired by electric folk, particularly in England, Germany and Brittany, adopted medieval and renaissance music as a basis for their music, in contrast to the early modern and 19th century ballada that dominated the output of Fairport Convention. This followed the trend explored by Steeleye Span, and exemplified by their 1972 album Below the Salt. Acts in this area included Gryphon, Gentle Giant and Third Ear Band. In Germany Ougenweide, originally formed in 1970 as an acoustic folk group, opted to draw exclusively on High German medieval music when they electrified, setting the agenda for future German electric folk. In Brittany, as part of the Celtic rock movement, medieval music was focused on by bands like Ripaille from 1977 and Saga de Ragnar Lodbrock from 1979. However, by the end of the 1970s almost all of these performers had either disbanded or moved, like Gentle Giant and Gryphon, into the developing area of progressive rock. One remaining but notable exponent of medieval folk rock is Ritchie Blackmore with Blackmore's Night.

=== Celtic rock ===
Initially Celtic rock replicated electric folk, but naturally replaced the element of English traditional music with its own folk music. It was rapidly evident in all areas of the Celtic nations and regions surrounding England, as Ireland, Scotland, Isle of Man, Wales, Cornwall, and Brittany all saw the adoption and adaptation of the electric folk model. Through at least the first half of the 1970s, as Celtic rock held close to folk roots, with its repertoire drawing heavily on traditional Celtic fiddle and harp tunes and even traditional vocal styles, but making use of rock band levels of amplification and percussion it can be considered part of the electric folk movement. However, as it developed into new derivatives and hybrids, including Celtic punk, Celtic metal, and other sorts of Celtic fusion, the initial electric folk pattern began to dissipate.

=== Folk punk ===
In the mid-1980s a new rebirth of English folk began, this time fusing folk forms with energy and political aggression derived from punk rock. Leaders included The Men They Couldn't Hang, Oysterband, Billy Bragg and The Pogues. Folk dance music also became popular in the 1980s, with the English Country Blues Band and Tiger Moth. The decade later saw the use of reggae with English folk music by the band Edward II & the Red Hot Polkas, especially on their seminal Let's Polkasteady from 1987.

=== Folk metal ===
In a process strikingly similar to the origins of electric folk in the 1960s, the English thrash metal band Skyclad added violins from a session musician on several tracks for their 1990 début album The Wayward Sons of Mother Earth. When this was well received they adopted a full-time fiddle player and moved towards a signature folk and jig style leading them to be credited as the pioneers of folk metal. This directly inspired the Dublin-based band Cruachan to use traditional Irish music in creating the Celtic metal subgenre. Attempts have been made elsewhere to replicate this process with examples ranging from the Middle Eastern folk music of Orphaned Land, the Baltic folk music of Skyforger and the Scandinavian folk music of Korpiklaani. In Germany this trend is more closely associated with the neo-medieval music known as medieval metal.

== Festivals ==
Fairport's Cropredy Convention (previously Cropredy Festival) has been held every year since 1980 near Cropredy, a village five miles north of Banbury, Oxfordshire and attracts up to 20,000 fans. It remains one of the key events in the UK folk festival calendar.

After holding a successful open-air concert at Kentwell Hall, Suffolk in 2005, Steeleye Span decided to hold their own annual festival, known as Spanfest.

Other, more traditional, folk festivals (Shrewsbury, Towersey, Cambridge and Sidmouth, to name but four) now routinely host performances by exponents of the folk-rock genre.

== Electric folk ==
When English bands of the late 1960s and early 1970s defined themselves as 'electric folk' they were making a distinction with the already existing 'folk rock'. Folk rock was (to them) what they had already been producing: American or American style singer-songwriter material played on rock instruments, as undertaken by Bob Dylan and the Byrds from 1965. They drew the distinction because they were focusing on indigenous (in this case English) songs and tunes. This is not to say that all the proponents of electric folk totally abandoned American material, or that it would not be represented in their own compositions, but their work would be characterised by the use of traditional English songs and tunes and the creation of new songs in that style, using the format and instruments of a rock band with the occasional addition of more traditional instruments.

The result of this hybridisation was an exchange of specific features drawn from traditional music and rock music. These have been defined as including:

Traditional music:

- Lyrics
- Tunes (including ornamentation)
- The drone (cf. bagpipes), but usually on a guitar or bass
- Use of some acoustic instruments
- Use of traditional rhythms; for example, an eight-beat rhythm of 3+3+2 with the stress on the first, fourth, and seventh beats, as in Led Zeppelin's "The Battle of Evermore", while not unusual precludes the standard rock backbeat.
- Blending of multiple songs in the traditional music style: often a short instrumental piece is inserted as an instrumental in a longer lyrical piece (i.e. a piece with vocals), both in traditional music and Electric folk

Rock music:

- Rhythm (specifically the backbeat)
- The hook
- Ostinati (plural of ostinato), a melodic and/or rhythmic figure that is persistently repeated throughout a piece or a section of a piece
- Use of some electric instrument
- The tempo of some songs may be altered well beyond the traditional boundaries
- Key changes may be added

Not all of these features are found in every song. For example, electric folk groups, while predominantly using traditional material as their source for lyrics and tunes, occasionally write their own (much as traditional musicians do).

== See also ==
- Electric folk artists
- Category:British folk rock groups
