= A Tapestry of Carols =

Studio album by Maddy Prior
- Released: 1987
- Recorded: 1987
- Genre: Folk; Christmas carols
- Length: 51:05

A Tapestry of Carols is an album by Maddy Prior. It is a collection of ancient carols from across Europe, played by The Carnival Band on replicas of medieval instruments. It was recorded at The Quaker Meeting House, Frenchay, near Bristol and released in 1987.

== Personnel ==
- Maddy Prior – vocals
- Bill Badley – baroque guitar, guitar, gittern, banjo, mandolin, mandocello, cittern, vocals
- Andrew Davis – double bass
- Charles Fullbrook – tabors, basel trommel, glockenspiel, bells, wood blocks, triangle, cymbals, vocals
- Giles Lewin – violin, recorders, vocals
- Andrew Watts – Flemish bagpipes, bassoon, curtal, clarinet, recorders, shawm, vocals
- Arrangements by Andrew Watts
- "Angels From The Realms Of Glory" arranged by Andrew Watts and Giles Lewin.

== Track listing ==
1. "The Sans Day Carol" (Traditional Cornish)
2. "In Dulci Jubilo" (German 14th century)
3. "God Rest Ye Merry Gentlemen" (Traditional English)
4. "It Came Upon The Midnight Clear" (Tune traditional English, words EH Sears)
5. "The Holly and the Ivy" (Traditional English)
6. "The Coventry Carol" (English 16th century)
7. "Ding Dong Merrily on High" (Tune traditional French 16th century, words GR Woodward)
8. "The Angel Gabriel" (Tune traditional Basque, words S Baring-Gould)
9. "Angels from the Realms of Glory" (Tune traditional French, words J Montgomery)
10. "Infant Holy" (Traditional Polish)
11. "A Virgin Most Pure" (Traditional English)
12. "Unto Us a Boy Is Born" (German Medieval)
13. "Rejoice and Be Merry" (Traditional English)
14. "Joseph Dearest" (German 16th century)
15. "Personent Hodie" (German 14th century)
16. "On Christmas Night" (Sussex Carol) (Traditional English)
