= The World Turned Upside Down (disambiguation) =

"The World Turned Upside Down" is an English ballad.

The World Turned Upside Down may also refer to:

- The World Turned Upside Down (anthology), a 2005 anthology of science fiction and fantasy short stories edited by David Drake, Eric Flint and Jim Baen
- The World Turned Upside Down (sculpture), a 2019 sculpture by Mark Wallinger
- The World Turned Upside Down, a 1972 book by the historian Christopher Hill
- The World Turned Upside Down, a 2021 book by journalist and historian Yang Jisheng
- "The World Turned Upside Down", a song by Coldplay released as the B-side to their 2005 single "Fix You"
- "The World Turned Upside Down", a 1975 song by Leon Rosselson, later covered by Billy Bragg and Chumbawamba
- "Yorktown (The World Turned Upside Down)", a song from the musical Hamilton (2015)

== See also ==
- "The Day the World Turned Upside Down", a 2012 story by Thomas Olde Heuvelt
- "Diggers' Song", a 1975 song by Leon Rosselson sometimes equated with the English ballad
