= Personent hodie =

Latin Christmas carol

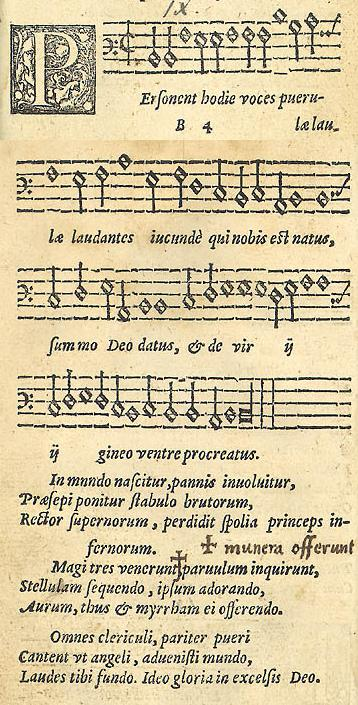
- From the 1582 edition of Piae Cantiones

Song
- Language: Latin
- English title: On this day earth shall ring
- Published: 1582
- Genre: Christmas carol

"Personent hodie" is a Christmas carol originally published in the 1582 Finnish song book Piae Cantiones, a volume of 74 Medieval songs with Latin texts collected by Jacobus Finno (Jaakko Suomalainen), a Swedish Lutheran cleric, and published by T.P. Rutha. The song book had its origins in the libraries of cathedral song schools, whose repertory had strong links with medieval Prague, where clerical students from Finland and Sweden had studied for generations. A melody found in a 1360 manuscript from the nearby Bavarian city of Moosburg in Germany is highly similar, and it is from this manuscript that the song is usually dated.

== Textual origins ==
The Latin text is probably a musical parody of an earlier 12th century song beginning "intonent hodie voces ecclesie", written in honour of Saint Nicholas, the patron saint of Russia, sailors and children – to whom he traditionally brings gifts on his feast day, 6 December. Hugh Keyte and Andrew Parrott note that two of the verses have an unusual double repeat ("Submersum, -sum, -sum puerum"; "Reddens vir-, vir-, vir-ginibus"). In "intonent hodie", these were used to illustrate the three boys and three girls saved by St Nicholas from drowning and prostitution, respectively. The text was probably re-written for the Feast of the Holy Innocents (28 December) when choristers and their "boy bishop" traditionally displaced the senior clergy from the choir stalls. The carol is still often associated with Holy Innocents' Day.

Songs from Piae Cantiones continued to be performed in Finland until the 19th century. The book became well known in Britain after a rare copy of Piae Cantiones owned by Peter of Nyland was given as a gift to the British Minister in Stockholm. He subsequently gave it to John Mason Neale in 1852, and it was from this copy that Neale, in collaboration with Thomas Helmore published songs in two collections in 1853 and 1854 respectively.

== Translations ==
The most common English translation of the text is by "James M. Joseph", a pseudonym of the composer Jane M. Joseph (1894–1929). She translates the title as "On this day earth shall ring", although there are several other English translations. Other versions include Elizabeth Poston's 1965 "Boys' Carol", which translates the first line of the text as "Let the boys' cheerful noise/Sing today none but joys" and John Mason Neale's "Let the Song be Begun", which uses the melody but not the text of the carol. Aidan Oliver's non-verse translation renders the text as "Today let the voices of children resound in joyful praise of Him who is born for us." The tune was also used for the hymn "Long Ago, Prophets Knew".

== Arrangements ==
The carol became more prominent in England after being arranged for unison voices and orchestra in 1916 by Gustav Holst (1874–1934), where in its organ reduction it is often used as a processional hymn in church and cathedral services. Holst's version often forms part of the Festival of Nine Lessons and Carols, and was last featured in the service broadcast by BBC2 from King's College Chapel, Cambridge in 2011 following the sixth lesson. This arrangement is sometimes referred to as "Theodoric" in reference to the composer's middle name (Theodore) and, in this setting, is the tune used for Percy Dearmer's hymn God is love, his the care.

In addition to Holst's version, there is a harmonised choral arrangement by Hugh Keyte and Andrew Parrott in the New Oxford Book of Carols, an arrangement by Antony Pitts in the Naxos Book of Carols and two arrangements by John Rutter; one for choir and full orchestra which emulates percussive medieval instrumentation, and another in his anthology Dancing Day for female or boys voices with harp or piano accompaniment. The Retrover Ensemble's performance for Naxos Records pairs the piece with Gaudete, another carol from Piae Cantiones.

A popular arrangement of the carol was written by Dr. Lara Hoggard as a Festival Procession that has been performed with full orchestra and organ and features a brass introduction and a climatic "Gloria in excelsis Deo".

Several recorded versions are arranged in a more folk-oriented style: for example, a performance by Maddy Prior and The Carnival Band on their 1987 album A Tapestry of Carols, which utilises period instruments. The female a cappella quartet Anonymous 4 have also recorded the song with its original "Intonent hodie" text on their CD Legends of St. Nicholas.

The contemporary English cross-disciplinary music ensemble North Sea Radio Orchestra have recorded a small-ensemble instrumental version of the piece arranged for two violins, cello, clarinet, bassoon, oboe, piano, vibraphone, chamber organ and guitar. This appears on their 2008 album Birds.

Jazz musician Wayne Shorter recorded his arrangement of the melody under the name 12th Century Carol on his 2003 album Alegria.

Robert Cummings, writing in the AllMusic guide, states that the "melody is glorious and ebullient in its lively, triumphant manner. It largely consists of bright, resolute three-note phrases whose overall structure gradually rises, then descends."

Bass guitarist/composer Chris Squire recorded his arrangement on the 2007 album Chris Squire's Swiss Choir accompanied by guitarist Steve Hackett and the English Baroque Choir.

== Text ==
Latin text of "Personent hodie" (1582)	Literal translation	English translation by Jane M. Joseph (1894–1929)	Latin text of "Intonent hodie" (c. 1360)
Personent hodie voces puerulae, laudantes iucunde qui nobis est natus, summo Deo datus, et de vir, vir, vir et de vir, vir et de virgineo ventre procreatus.	Let resound today the voices of children, joyfully praising Him who is born to us, given by most high God, and conceived in a virginal womb.	On this day earth shall ring with the song children sing to the Lord, Christ our King, born on earth to save us; him the Father gave us. Refrain; Id-e-o-o-o, id-e-o-o-o, Id-e-o gloria in excelsis Deo!	Intonent hodie Voces ecclesiae, Dies laetitiae Refulsit in mundo, Ergo laetabundo Corde jubilemus Et ore jucundo.
In mundo nascitur, pannis involvitur praesepi ponitur stabulo brutorum, rector supernorum. Perdidit, dit, dit, perdidit, dit perdidit spolia princeps infernorum.	He was born into the world, wrapped in swaddling clothes, and laid in a manger in a stable for animals, the master of the heavens. The prince of Hell has lost his spoils.	His the doom, ours the mirth; when he came down to earth, Bethlehem saw his birth; ox and ass beside him from the cold would hide him. Refrain	Sanctus hic inclitus, Domino subditus, In cunis positus Ubera vitabat, Corpus macerabat, Et ter in sabbato Puer jejunabat.
Magi tres venerunt, munera offerunt, parvulum inquirunt, stellulam sequendo, ipsum adorando, aurum, thus, thus, thus, aurum thus, thus aurum, thus, et myrrham ei offerendo.	Three Magi came, they were bearing gifts, and sought the little one, following a star, to worship him, and offer him gold, frankincense, and myrrh.	God's bright star, o'er his head, Wise Men three to him led; kneel they low by his bed, lay their gifts before him, praise him and adore him. Refrain	Parenti misero Submerso puero Mari pestifero Dedit, quod petivit, Preces exaudivit, Submersum puerum Patris custodivit.
Omnes clericuli, pariter pueri, cantent ut angeli: advenisti mundo, laudes tibi fundo. Ideo, o, o, ideo, o ideo gloria in excelsis Deo.	Let all the junior clerics and also the boys sing like angels: "You have come to the world, I pour out praises to you. Therefore, glory to God in the highest!"	On this day angels sing; with their song earth shall ring, praising Christ, heaven's King, born on earth to save us; peace and love he gave us. Refrain	Tribus virginibus Victu carentibus Reddidit honorem, Subtraxit errorem, Reddens virginibus Virgineum florem.

In several versions, such as the Holst arrangement, the third verse has "parvulum inquirunt, Bethlehem adeunt" in place of "munera offerunt, parvulum inquirunt."

== See also ==
- List of Christmas carols
