= To Be a Pilgrim =

English Christian hymn written by John Bunyan

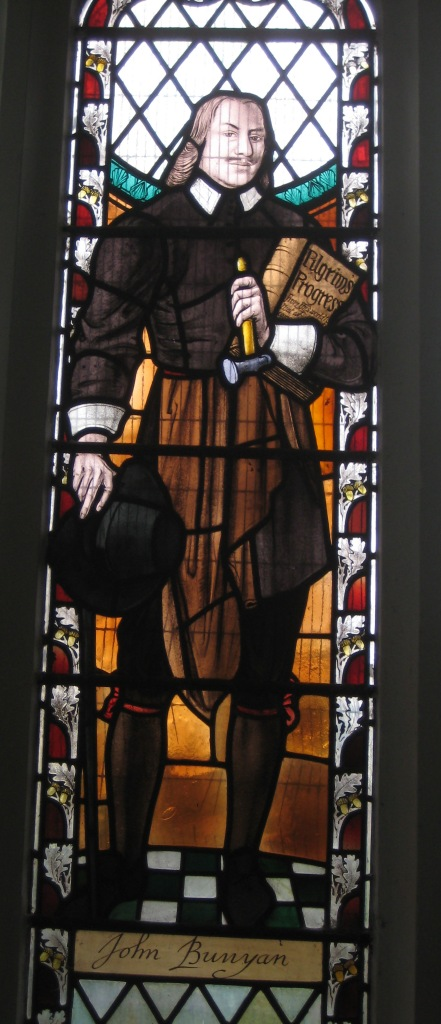
- John Bunyan
- Genre: Hymn
- Written: 1684
- Text: John Bunyan
- Based on: Hebrews 11:13
- Meter: 6.5.6.5.6.6.6.5
- Melody: "St. Dunstans" by Winfred Douglas, "Moab" by John Roberts, "Monk's Gate" by Ralph Vaughan Williams

"To Be a Pilgrim", also known as "He Who Would Valiant Be", or "He Who Would True Valour See" is an English Christian hymn using words of John Bunyan in The Pilgrim's Progress, first appearing in Part 2 of The Pilgrim's Progress, written in 1684. An alternative variation of the words was produced by Percy Dearmer in 1906.

The hymn has been set to various melodies; notably Monk's Gate, St Dunstan's and Moab. The hymn treats life as a pilgrimage, in which the individual should patiently endure life's many setbacks, and keep the faith by striving for a more godly life.

== Melody ==
In 1906 the British composer Ralph Vaughan Williams set the words to a melody taken from the traditional song "Our Captain Cried All Hands" which he collected in the hamlet of Monk's Gate in West Sussex – hence the name of "Monks Gate" by which the melody is referred to in hymn books.

The hymn is also been sung to the melody "Moab" (John Roberts, 1870) and "St Dunstans" (Charles W. Douglas, 1917).

== Textual variants ==
The original words were adapted for the English Hymnal in 1906.

John Bunyan's Original Version	1906 The English Hymnal Version
1. Who would true valour see,	1. He who would valiant be
Let him come hither;	′Gainst all disaster,
One here will constant be,	Let him in constancy
Come wind, come weather	Follow the Master.
There's no discouragement	There's no discouragement
Shall make him once relent	Shall make him once relent
His first avowed intent	His first avowed intent
To be a pilgrim.	To be a pilgrim.
2. Whoso beset him round	2. Who so beset him round
With dismal stories,	With dismal stories,
Do but themselves confound;	Do but themselves confound——
His strength the more is.	His strength the more is.
No lion can him fright,	No foes shall stay his might,
He'll with a giant fight,	Though he with giants fight:
But he will have a right	He will make good his right
To be a pilgrim.	To be a pilgrim.
3. Hobgoblin, nor foul fiend[,]	3. Since, Lord, thou dost defend
Can daunt his spirit;	Us with thy Spirit,
He knows he at the end	We know we at the end
Shall life inherit.	Shall life inherit.
Then fancies fly away,	Then fancies flee away!
He'll fear not what men say,	I'll fear not what men say,
He'll labour night and day	I'll labour night and day
To be a pilgrim.	To be a pilgrim.

== Reception and usage ==
For a time, Bunyan's original version was not commonly sung in churches, perhaps because of the references to "hobgoblin" and "foul fiend." However, one commentator has said: "Bunyan's burly song strikes a new and welcome note in our Hymnal. The quaint sincerity of the words stirs us out of our easygoing dull Christianity to the thrill of great adventure." Recent hymn books have tended to return to the original, for example, the Church of England's Common Praise and the Church of Scotland's Church Hymnary 4th Edition (Hymns of Glory, Songs of Praise).

The hymn's refrain "to be a pilgrim" has entered the language and has been used in the title of a number of books dealing with pilgrimage in a literal or spiritual sense.

=== School hymn ===
- UK: Royal Grammar School, Guildford, Reed's School, Newcastle Grammar School, Derby Grammar School, Westcliff High School for Girls, Dartford Grammar School, Cardinal Vaughan Memorial School, Reigate Grammar School, former Pilgrim School, Bedford, Caistor Grammar School, Lord Wandsworth College, Haberdashers' Aske's Boys' School, The Ladies’ College, Norwich High School for Girls GDST, Saint Felix School, North London Collegiate School, Woodberry Down Comprehensive School, Taunton prep school, Queen Elizabeth's Academy.
- Canada: St. Clement's School (Toronto), Elmwood School (Ottawa) and Ashbury College
- Nigeria: Hope Waddell Training Institution
- US: Saint Sebastian's School
- Australia: The Cathedral School of St Anne and St James, Townsville
- South Africa: Victoria Girls' High School. Grahamstown

=== Films, TV and radio ===
- Sung in Season 1, Episode 5 of Keeping Up Appearances
- Opening scene of the 1962 film Term of Trial
- Lindsay Anderson's 1968 film "if....", characterising the traditional religious education of an English public school of the time
- 1986 film Clockwise starring John Cleese
- Richard Attenborough's 1977 World War II film, A Bridge Too Far
- Doctor Who episodes
  - "Human Nature" and "The Family of Blood", 2007
  - Last episodes of Season 3, foreshadowing the Tenth Doctor's meeting with the Master
- Radio play by Rachel Joyce, broadcast as the BBC Radio 4 afternoon play. It won the Tinniswood Award in 2007 for best original drama.
- In the TV version of The Midwich Cuckoos, it's the school song for the Blackout Children.

=== Miscellaneous ===
"To be a Pilgrim" has been adopted by the British Special Air Service as their battle hymn. (Note: See also Special Air Service § Memorial and The Golden Road to Samarkand by James Elroy Flecker)

- State funeral of former British prime minister Winston Churchill on January 30, 1965.
- Funeral of former British prime minister Margaret Thatcher on April 17, 2013, in the English Hymnal version. It was one of her favourite hymns.
- Thanksgiving Service 2022 of Prince Philip, Duke of Edinburgh, in Westminster Abbey, 29 March 2022. The hymn was played as the Queen took her seat in the Abbey.
- Selected by Tony Benn as one of his choices on BBC Radio 4's Desert Island Discs in January 1989.
- An episode of the Australian soap opera Neighbours in 2019.
- The Frankenstein Chronicles, Season 1, Episode 5, circa minute 41

== Notable recordings ==
- Maddy Prior and The Carnival Band – album Sing Lustily And With Good Courage.
- Lesley Duncan and Joyce Everson in 1973 on the GM Label in England.
