= The Blazing World (book) =

2023 book by Jonathan Healey

The Blazing World: A New History of Revolutionary England 1603–1689
- Author: Jonathan Healey
- Subject: History of England 1603-1689
- Published: 2023
- Publisher: Knopf
- Media type: book
- Pages: 512

The Blazing World: A New History of Revolutionary England, 1603–1689, is a work of narrative history by Jonathan Healey. It examines 17th century England until 1689, culminating in The Glorious Revolution.

== Background ==
Healey is a social historian of early-modern England. He is Associate Professor in Social History at Kellogg College, Oxford. The title of the work makes reference to The Blazing World, a 1666 work of prose fiction by the English writer Margaret Cavendish, the Duchess of Newcastle.

== Reception ==
The Blazing World was positively received. In the LA Review of Books, though, Ed Simon opined that Christopher Hill's The World Turned Upside Down remained the "pertinent" work on the subject. Writing in the New York Times, David Cressy praised the way in which Healey gave vitality to the world and historical figures of the period. He wrote that Healey did not aim to advance a new interpretation, but that the work is "rich with anecdotes and explanations" and "refreshing for its energetic writing". He also felt it was "well-founded in recent historical scholarship".

In the Times Literary Supplement, Michael Braddick writes of the difficulty of containing the variety of subjects in the period, including figures such as Isaac Newton, and Healey's forced inclusion of information on neighbouring countries such as Scotland. In The Wall Street Journal, Stephen Brumwell writes that Healey is "convincing" in arguing that the period was "truly revolutionary". Brumwell comments on Healey's "humorous prose" and "clear-sighted narrative" including "original analysis" of "far-reaching changes".
