= James Nelthorpe =

James Nelthorpe may refer to:

- James Nelthorpe (MP for Tiverton)
- James Nelthorpe (Parliamentarian), MP for Beverley
- James Tuder Nelthorpe, English local magistrate and landowner
