= Hang Up Sorrow and Care =

Studio album by Maddy Prior and The Carnival Band
- Released: 1995
- Label: Park Records

Hang Up Sorrow and Care is an album by Maddy Prior and the Carnival Band. Released in 1995, it is a loose concept album, with renditions of songs that were written hundreds of years ago.

== Critical reception ==
Professional ratings
Review scores
Source	Rating
AllMusic	4/5 stars
The Indianapolis Star	3/4 stars

Stereo Review stated: "Ballads and dances to the heart and the bottle are expertly played in a trad setting that features such instruments as lute, recorder, hoboy, curtal, kazoo, and 'ye great dooble bass'." The St. Louis Post-Dispatch deemed Hang Up Sorrow and Care "the most inspired drinking album of the digital era."

AllMusic wrote that "Maddy Prior and the Carnival Band have made a real party album, of witty, upbeat traditional songs from the British Isles."

== Track listing ==
1. Prodigal's Resolution (Anon 18th century)
2. 5 Playford Tunes (from Playford's "English Dancing Master")
3. The World is Turned Upside Down (Anon 17th century)
4. Jovial Beggar (Anon 17th century)
5. Leathern Bottle (Anon 17th century)
6. Iantha (Anon English 18th century)
7. An Thou were my ain Thing (Anon Scottish 18th century)
8. Oh that I had but a Fine Man (Pelham Humphry)
9. Now O Now I needs must part (John Dowland)
10. Man is for the Woman made (Henry Purcell)
11. A Northern Catche/The Little Barleycorne (John Hilton/Trad)
12. Granny's Delight/My Lady Foster's Delight (Anon 18th century)
13. A Round of Three Country Dances in One (Thomas Ravenscroft)
14. Youth's the Season Made for Joys (Words: John Gay/Tune: anon)
15. In The Days of my Youth (Words: John Gay/Tune: anon)
16. Never weatherbeaten sail (Thomas Campion)
17. Old Simon the King (Anon)

== Personnel ==
- Maddy Prior - vocals
- William Badley - baroque guitar, lute, acoustic guitar, electric guitar, banjo mandolin, vocals
- Andrew Davis - Double Bass
- Giles Lewin - violin, recorders, hoboy, mandolin, vocals
- Andrew Watts - Flemish bagpipes, shalman, curtals, recorders, melodica, kazoo, vocals
- Rafaello Mizraki - drums, percussion, cello, Hammond organ, vocals
- Arrangements by Andrew Watts
