= An Evening of Carols and Capers =

Studio album by Maddy Prior and the Carnival Band
- Released: 2005
- Genre: British folk rock
- Label: Park

An Evening of Carols and Capers is an album by Maddy Prior with The Carnival Band.

This double album is effectively an audio version of the DVD of the same name, though the tracks vary slightly. It is a collection of live recordings from concerts in Oxford and Salisbury. The dates are not given. The songs originated from the studio albums Carols and Capers, Gold, Frankincense & Myrrh and A Tapestry of Carols. To break up the proceedings there are some instrumentals. The "Tinker Polka" derives from a vintage 1930 recording of a Texas Czech band. The song "Balthazar" has an African rhythm, and "Melima" sounds Arabic. "M Charpentier's Christmas Stomp" (CD1) is the same as "M Charpentier's Christmas Swing" (CD2) except that the latter is jazzy. Running time CD1: 37m 57s. CD2: 41m 14s. The package is dated 2005 but it wasn't released until December 2006. The liner notes contain the words to all the songs.

== Track listing ==
CD 1

1. Masters in this Hall (Words: William Morris; Music: French Traditional)
2. The Sans Day Carol (Cornish Traditional)
3. God Rest You Merry Gentlemen (Traditional)
4. This Endris Night (Anon 16th century)
5. M Charpentier's Christmas Stomp (instrumental) (1. French Trad 2. M Charpentier)
6. Let an Anthem of Praise (Words: Caleb Ashworth; Music: Traditional)
7. The Oxen (Prior/ Lewin/ Watts/ Mizraki/ Banks/ Davis/ Badley)
8. Balthazar (Prior/ Lewin/ Watts/ Mizraki/ Banks/ Davis/ Badley)
9. Round of the Animals (Prior/ Mizraki)
10. Melima (Prior/ Lewin/ Watts/ Mizraki/ Banks/ Davis/ Badley)

CD 2

1. It Came Upon the Midnight Clear (Tune: Traditional, Words by EH Sears (18th century))
2. On Christmas Night (Sussex Carol) (Traditional)
3. Watts' Cradle Song (Words: Isaac Watts; tune: US early 19th century)
4. Vals Musette (instrumental) (Andre Verchuren Traditional)
5. Entre Le Boeuf (sung in French) (Traditional)
6. M Charpentier's Christmas Swing (instrumental) (1. French Traditional 2. M Charpentier)
7. Dratenik (Tinker Polka) (instrumental) (Bacova's Ceska Kapela)
8. The Carnal and the Crane (Child 55) (Traditional)
9. Ding Dong Merrily on High (Tune: French Trad; words GR Woodward)
10. Angels from the Realms of Glory (Words: Montgomery; Music: French Traditional)
11. Hark, Hark (sung a cappella) (Words: J Stephenson; Tune: Traditional)
12. While Shepherds Watched (Words: Nahum Tate/ Nicholas Brady; Tune: Traditional)

== Personnel ==
- Maddy Prior - vocals
- Andrew Watts - Shawmes, curtal, clarinet, recorders, Brueghel bagpipes, vocals
- Giles Lewin - Shawm, fiddle, recorders, medieval bagpipes, tin whistle, mandolin, vocals
- Andrew "Jub" Davis - Bass
- Steve Banks - Drums, percussion, bells, fiddle, vocals
- William "Steno" Badley - baroque guitar, lute, acoustic guitar, electric guitar, banjo mandolin, vocals
- Rafaello Mizraki - Acoustic and electric guitars, lute, mandolin, vocals
