= Sing Lustily and with Good Courage =

1990 album by Maddy Prior and the Carnival Band

Studio album by Maddy Prior and the Carnival Band
- Released: 1990
- Recorded: March 1990
- Studio: Valley Recordings
- Genre: Gallery music
- Label: Saydisc
- Producers: David Wilkins, Gef Lucena

Sing Lustily And With Good Courage is an album by Maddy Prior and the Carnival Band. It was recorded at Valley Recordings in March 1990 and released as a CD on the Saydisc label.

This is a collection of "Gallery Songs" from the 18th and early 19th centuries. Gallery songs were popular hymns which were purged from hymnals in the late nineteenth centuries. The best known precedent for recording such an album is The Watersons' "Sound, Sound Your Instruments of Joy" (1977).

== Track listing ==
1. Who would true valour see (John Bunyan – music; trad)
2. Rejoice ye shining worlds (Isaac Watts – music from Harmonia Sacra)
3. O Thou who camest from above (Charles Wesley – music; Samuel Stanley)
4. Lo! He comes with clouds descending (Charles Wesley – music; anon)
5. How firm a foundation (Richard Keen – music; trad)
6. O for a thousand tongues to sing (Charles Wesley – music; Thomas Jarman)
7. As pants the hart (Nahum Tate – music; Hugh Wilson)
8. The God of Abraham Praise (Thomas Oliver – music; anon)
9. Instrumentals: The Twenty-Ninth of May or The Jovial Beggars / Monkland (anon)
10. Light of the World (Charles Wesley – music; anon)
11. All hail the pow'r of Jesus' name (Edward Perronet & John Rippon – music; James Ellor)
12. Lord, in the morning (Isaac Watts – music; anon)
13. Away with our sorrow and care (Charles Wesley – music; Thomas Arne)
14. Christ the Lord is ris'n today (Charles Wesley – music; anon
15. O Worship the King (Robert Grant – music; William Croft)
16. And can it be? (Charles Wesley – music; Thomas Campbell)

== Personnel ==
- Maddy Prior – Singer
- Bill Badley – Lute, guitar, steel-string guitar, Mandolin, mandocello, banjo, vocals
- Charles Fullbrook – Tabors, Side drum, Bass drum, cymbals, wood blocks, cowbell, vocals
- Andrew "Jub" Davis – Double bass
- Giles Lewin – Violin, recorder, vocals
- Andy Watts – Curtal, Basson, clarinet, recorder, vocals
- Gary Wilson – drums, Percussion
