= Sans Day Carol =

Cornish Christmas carol

The "Sans Day Carol", also known as "St. Day Carol", "The Holly Bears a Berry" and "The Holly Tree" is a traditional Cornish carol named after the Cornish village of St Day, where it was found around the turn of the twentieth century. Some sources give it as a Christmas carol, while other sources give it as a carol for the period between Passiontide and Easter. The song, which is listed as no. 35 in the Oxford Book of Carols, is very closely related to the more famous carol "The Holly and the Ivy". According to the Roud Folk Song Index, the "Sans Day Carol" and "The Holly and the Ivy" are variants of the same song (Roud 514).

== Origin ==
The carol and its melody were first collected and transcribed by Gilbert Hunter Doble from the singing of W.D. Watson of Penzance, Cornwall, the Borough of Penzance's Head Gardener. Watson had learned the song in the early 1900s from a man aged around fifty or sixty years named Thomas Beard, a villager in St Day in the parish of Gwennap, Cornwall. In the early 1930s, the American folklorist James Madison Carpenter recorded W.D. Watson singing the song on wax cylinder; the recording can be heard online via the Vaughan Williams Memorial Library.

W.D. Watson translated the song into Cornish, which he thought had been the original language of the song, and added a fourth verse. After learning the song from W.D. Watson in English, Doble arranged the carol, altering it slightly, and publishing it in 1929. The fourth verse published by Doble is a translation of the "Ma gron war'n gelln" verse written by Watson.

== Text ==
The most common and earliest used text for this carol is as follows:

1. Now the holly bears a berry as white as the milk,
And Mary bore Jesus, who was wrapped up in silk:

Chorus: And Mary bore Jesus Christ our Saviour for to be,
And the first tree in the greenwood, it was the holly.
Holly! Holly!
And the first tree in the greenwood, it was the holly!

2. Now the holly bears a berry as green as the grass,
And Mary bore Jesus, who died on the cross:

Chorus

3. Now the holly bears a berry as black as the coal,
And Mary bore Jesus, who died for us all:

Chorus

4. Now the holly bears a berry, as blood is it red,
Then trust we our Saviour, who rose from the dead:

Chorus

== "When the Angel Came to Mary" ==
British hymnodist Michael Perry composed the text "When the Angel Came to Mary" which is also sung to the Sans Day Carol.

== Recorded versions ==
- 1930s - William Watson singing the carol he translated in an early 1930s recording (from 8.06)
- 1965 - The Watersons - Frost and Fire: A Calendar of Ceremonial Folk Songs
- 1969 - The Clancy Brothers - The Clancy Brothers Christmas
- 1976 - Philip Ledger and the King's College Choir - Carols for Christmas Eve
- 1988 - Rita MacNeil - Now the Bells Ring
- 1991 - The Chieftains - The Bells of Dublin
- 1993 - John Rutter and the Cambridge Singers - Christmas Day in the Morning
- 1998 - David Hill and the Choir of Winchester Cathedral - O Come Let Us Adore Him: Christmas Carols from Winchester Cathedral
- 1996 - Sue White - Best of Cornish Folksongs, Vols I & II
- 2004 - Cherish the Ladies - On Christmas Night
- 2006 - Maddy Prior - An Evening of Carols and Capers
- 2007 - Chris Squire - Chris Squire's Swiss Choir
- 2008 - Nidarosdomens Guttekor (Nidaros Cathedral Boys' Choir) - I Wish
- 2009 - Belshazzar's Feast (Paul Sartin and Paul Hutchinson)- "Frost Bites"
- 2011 - Sandy Denny, Patsy and Alex Campbell - 19 Rupert St (recorded 1967)
- 2011 - Kate Rusby - While Mortals Sleep
- 2020 - Burd Ellen - Says the Never Beyond
- 2024 - Janice Burns & John Doran - Sans Day Carol

== See also ==
- List of Christmas carols
