= Fred Pratt Green =

British Methodist minister and hymnodist (1903–2000)

- Born: Fred Pratt Green; 2 September 1903; Roby, Lancashire, England
- Died: 22 October 2000 (aged 97)
- Occupations: Minister, hymnodist

The Reverend Fred Pratt Green MBE (2 September 1903 – 22 October 2000) was a British Methodist minister and hymnodist.

Born in Roby, Lancashire, England, he began his ministry in the Filey circuit. He was ordained as a Methodist minister in 1928 and served circuits in the north and south of England until 1969. During his career as a minister he wrote numerous plays and hymns. It was not until he retired, however, that he began writing prolifically.

His hymns reflect his rejection of fundamentalism and show his concern with social issues. They include many that were written to supply obvious liturgical needs of the modern church, speaking to topics or appropriate for events for which there were few traditional hymns available. Green also wrote poetry: his poem The Old Couple was included by Philip Larkin in 'The Oxford Book of Twentieth-Century English Verse' (1973). He died on 22 October 2000. His obituary in The Times of 24 October 2000 quoted him as saying of hymn singing, "It’s such a dangerous activity … you get this glow which you can mistake for religious experience".

His hymns appear in hymn books of various denominations, but most notably in Singing the Faith, the hymn book of the Methodist Church of Great Britain, and the United Methodist Hymnal used in the United States. Hymnal indexes vary in alphabetizing him under 'G' or 'P'.

As well as writing his own hymns, Green produced translations, notably translating one of Dietrich Bonhoeffer's late poems as the hymn, "By gracious powers so wonderfully sheltered".

The Pratt Green Trust was set up from the royalties from his hymns. His scrapbooks and hymnbook collections are now held in the Pratt Green Collection at Durham University.

The collection of related materials at the Pitts Theology Library at Emory University, Atlanta, consists of 51 scrapbooks maintained by Fred Pratt Green from approximately 1971 until he ceased writing hymns in 1988. Green compiled an index to his scrapbooks which includes an index to the first line of each hymn, references to pieces in Hymns and Ballads by Fred Pratt Green, color-coded references to published works and translations, and information on how a hymn was used. The scrapbooks contain drafts of hymns, photographs, correspondence, bulletins and programs from services that used his hymns, announcements, newspaper and journal clippings, and handwritten notations by Green describing when a hymn was written and reprinted and why and for whom the piece was written.

== List of hymns (partial) ==
- A Carol for Easter Eve
- A Carol for Mothering Sunday
- An upper room did our Lord prepare
- Christ is the world's light
- For the Fruits of his Creation
- God in his love for us lent us this planet
- God is here! As we his people meet to offer praise and prayer
- How Blest Are They Who Trust in Christ
- How clear is our vocation, Lord
- In that Land which we call Holy
- It is God who holds the nations in the hollow of his hand
- Let Us Praise Creation's Lord
- Long ago prophets knew Christ would come, born a Jew
- Lord Let Us Listen When You Speak
- Lord we have come at your own invitation
- Now Praise the Hidden Love of God
- O Christ, the Healer
- Of All the Spirit's Gifts to Me
- Rejoice in God's Saints
- Seek the Lord
- The church of Christ, in every age
- There is a Love
- This joyful Eastertide, what need is there (not to be confused with This joyful Eastertide by George Ratcliffe Woodward)
- This Is The Threefold Truth
- To Mock Your Reign, O Dearest Lord
- What Adam's disobedience cost
- When in Our Music God Is Glorified
- When Jesus Came to Jordan
- When Our Confidence Is Shaken
- When the Church of Jesus
- Whom Shall I Send?
- You Dear Lord Resplendent Within Our Darkness
- Yours Be the Glory

== Publications ==
- The Hymns of Fred Pratt Green, Braley The Expository Times.2003; 114: 409-412
- The Hymns and Ballads of Fred Pratt Green. Stainer & Bell
- Later Hymns and Ballads and Fifty Poems. Stainer & Bell/Hope
- The Old Couple. Poems. Stockport, Peterloo Poets, 1976
- The Last Lap. A Sequence of Verse on the Theme of Old Age. London, Stainer & Bell Ltd and Carol Stream, Hope Publishing Company, 1991.

== Sources ==
- Pitts Theology Library
