= Maplehurst, West Sussex =

Hamlet in West Sussex, England

Coordinates: 51.00853°N 0.3062°W

Maplehurst
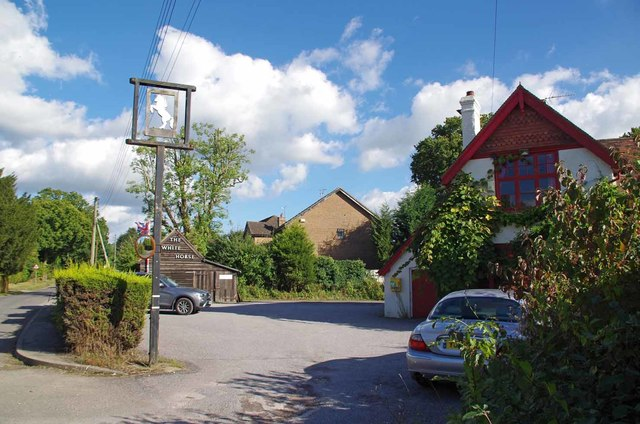
- The White Horse, Maplehurst

- Location within West Sussex
- OS grid reference: TQ189246
- Civil parish: Nuthurst
- District: Horsham
- Shire county: West Sussex
- Region: South East
- Country: England
- Sovereign state: United Kingdom
- Police: Sussex
- Fire: West Sussex
- Ambulance: South East Coast
- UK Parliament: Horsham

Maplehurst is a hamlet in the civil parish of Nuthurst, and the Horsham District of West Sussex, England. The hamlet is on the Copsale to Nuthurst road, 3.8 miles (6.2 km) south from the town of Horsham. There is one pub, The White Horse, on Park Lane just off Nuthurst Road.
