= Monk's Gate =

Hamlet in West Sussex, England

Coordinates: 51.03519°N 0.28579°W

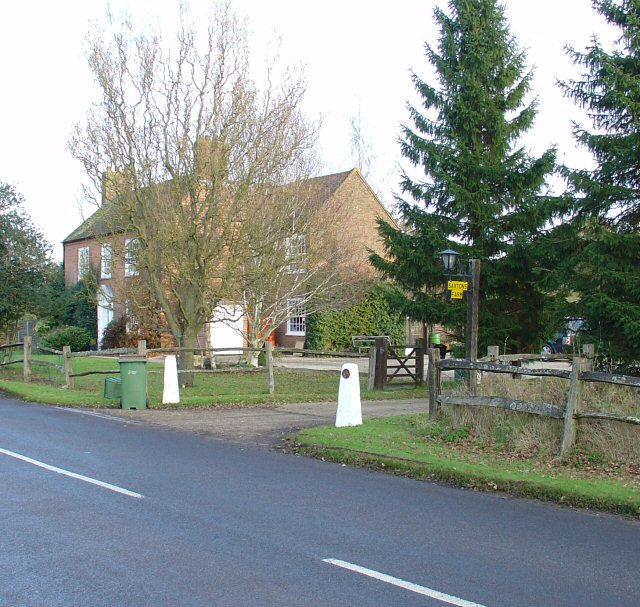
- Saxtons Farm, Monks Gate

- Location within West Sussex
- OS grid reference: TQ202276
- Civil parish: Nuthurst
- District: Horsham
- Shire county: West Sussex
- Region: South East
- Country: England
- Sovereign state: United Kingdom
- Police: Sussex
- Fire: West Sussex
- Ambulance: South East Coast
- UK Parliament: Horsham

Monk's Gate is a hamlet in the civil parish of Nuthurst, in the Horsham District of West Sussex, England. It lies on the A281 road 3 miles (5 km) southeast from Horsham. Its name arose because it was the site of one of the gates into St Leonard's Forest.

== Hymn tune ==
Although it is a tiny settlement, its name is well known around the world as a popular hymn tune in 6.5.6.5. 6 6 6 5 meter, used for the hymn To be a pilgrim by John Bunyan.

When Ralph Vaughan Williams was commissioned at the start of the 20th century to edit a new hymnal as an alternative to Hymns Ancient and Modern, he set the hymn, in an adaptation by Percy Dearmer, to his own adaptation of the tune of an English folk song Valiant or Welcome Sailor which he had collected from Mrs Harriet Verrall of Monk's Gate. Mrs Verrall was also the source of a widely used tune for the carol "On Christmas night all Christians sing", with her version thereafter being called the Sussex Carol.
