= Long Ago, Prophets Knew =

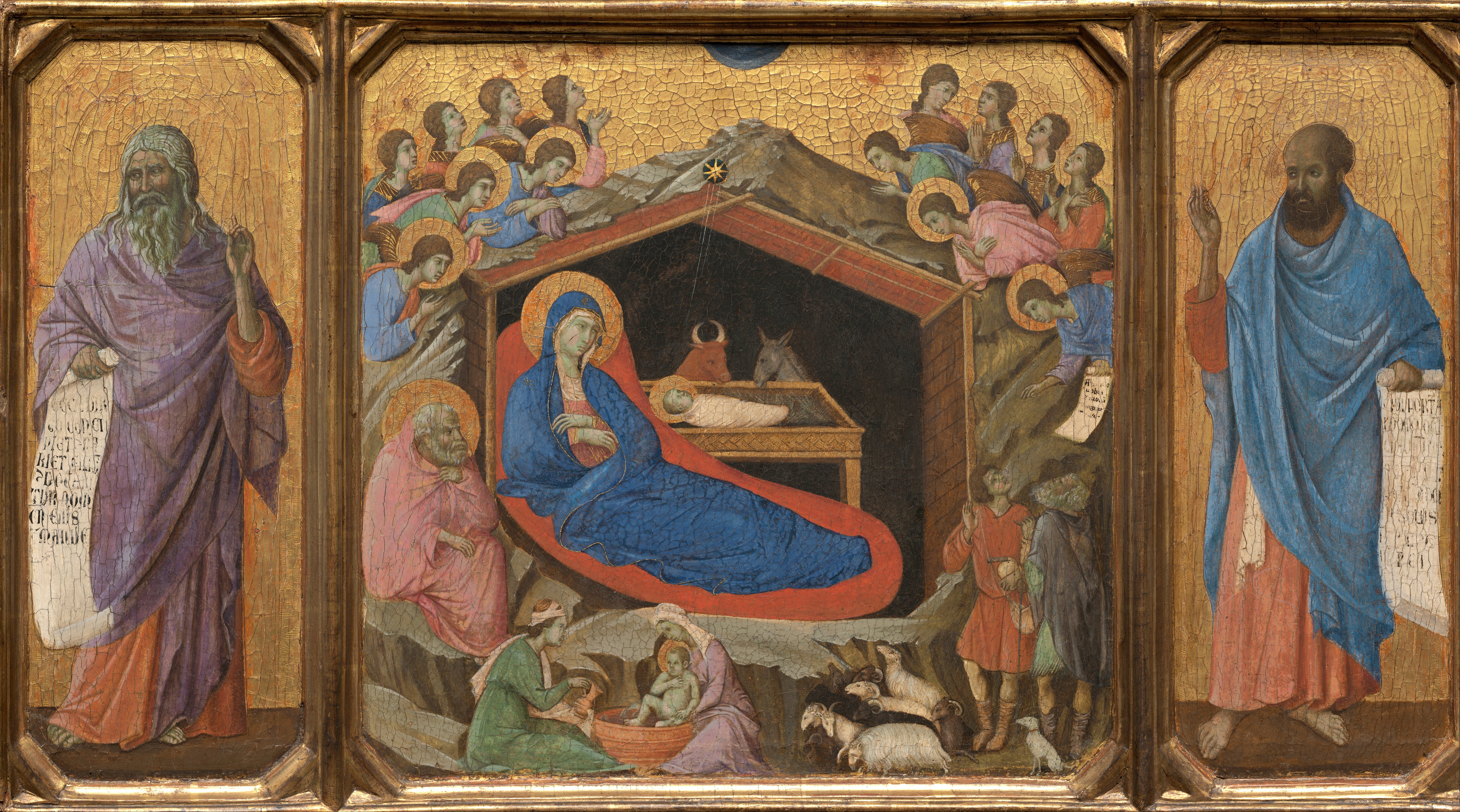
- The Nativity with the Prophets Isaiah and Ezekiel by Duccio

Hymn
- Published: 1970
- Composers: Traditional, adapted by Gustav Holst
- Lyricist: Fred Pratt Green

"Long Ago, Prophets Knew", also called "Long Ago, Prophets Knew, Christ would come born a Jew", is an English Christian Advent carol written by Reverend Fred Pratt Green in 1970.

== Textual history ==
"Long Ago, Prophets Knew" was written by Methodist minister Fred Pratt Green in 1970 at the behest of John Wilson. It was self-published in his "26 Hymns" a year later. The carol gained popularity within the Church of England when it was published within the More Hymns for Today hymnal in 1980 and Hymns Ancient and Modern – New Standard" in 1983. In 1986, when The New English Hymnal was being compiled with hymns appropriate for Eucharist services being prioritised, "Long Ago, Prophets Knew" was included at the behest of the former Archdeacon of Hackney, George Timms, in order to fill required spaces in the hymnal for feast days and promote newer hymns. "Long Ago, Prophets Knew" was one of around 50 hymns written after 1950 to be included in the collection of 506 hymns. Though the carol was written for Advent, it has also been used as a Christmas carol. Baptists use the carol in connection with Bible readings from 2 Samuel:7 and Romans 16:17-25. Methodists use the carol on the Fourth Sunday in Advent.

== Tune ==
Green set it to the tune of "Personent hodie". While the carol was written for organ with a 66.666 metre, an additional alternate accompanying supplement for thirteen handbells was also written to tie into the chorus of "ring bells, ring, ring, ring!" The carol was an example of a modern hymn that utilised an older style of including a repetitive monosyllable in the chorus.
