= The World Turned Upside Down =

Song

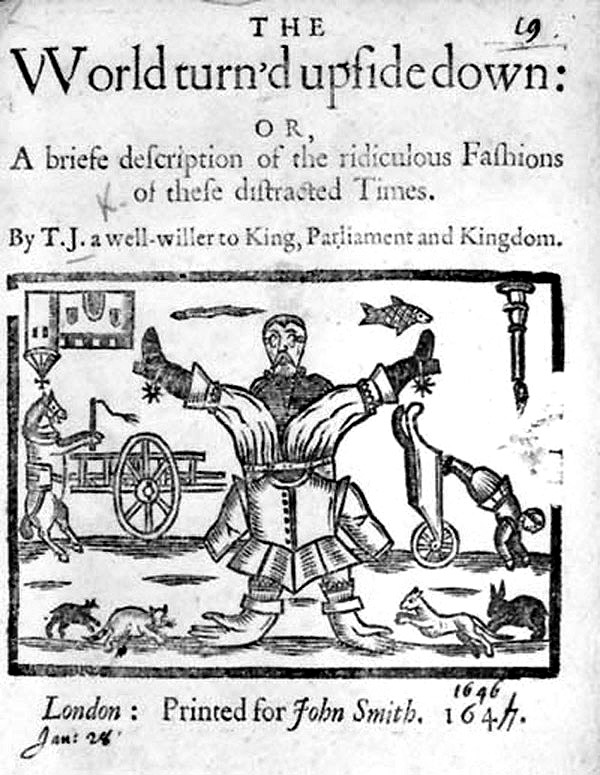
1646 publication of the ballad with a woodcut frontispiece.

"The World Turned Upside Down" is an English ballad. It was first published on a broadside in the middle of the 1640s as a protest against the policies of Parliament relating to the celebration of Christmas.

Parliament believed the holiday should be a solemn occasion, and outlawed traditional English Christmas celebrations, which were seen as too closely associated with Catholicism. There are several versions of the lyrics. It is sung to the tune of another ballad, "When the king enjoys his own again".

Its origin is in the Scripture: "But the other Jews which believed not, moved with envy, took unto them certain lewd fellows of the baser sort, and gathered a company, and set all the city on an uproar, and assaulted the house of Jason, and sought to bring them out to the people. (6) And when they found them not, they drew Jason and certain brethren unto the rulers of the city, crying, 'These that have turned the world upside down are come hither also; Whom Jason hath received: and these all do contrary to the decrees of Caesar, saying that there is another king, one Jesus'." Acts 17:5–7

== Yorktown ==
According to American legend, the British Army band under Lord Cornwallis played this tune when they surrendered after the Siege of Yorktown (1781). Customarily, the British Army would have played an American or French tune in tribute to the victors, but General Washington refused them the honours of war and insisted that they play "a British or German march." Although American history textbooks continue to propagate the legend, the story is almost certain to have been apocryphal as it first appears in the historical record a century after the surrender.

== Lyrics ==
The following is the text found in the Thomason Tracts (669. f. 10 (47)), dated 8 April 1646.

"The World Turned Upside Down" (to the tune of "When the King enjoys his own again"):

Listen to me and you shall hear, news hath not been this thousand year:
Since Herod, Caesar, and many more, you never heard the like before.
Holy-dayes are despis'd, new fashions are devis'd.
Old Christmas is kickt out of Town.
Yet let's be content, and the times lament, you see the world turn'd upside down.

The wise men did rejoyce to see our Savior Christs Nativity:
The Angels did good tidings bring, the Sheepheards did rejoyce and sing.
Let all honest men, take example by them.
Why should we from good Laws be bound?
Yet let's be content, and the times lament, you see the world turn'd upside down.

Command is given, we must obey, and quite forget old Christmas day:
Kill a thousand men, or a Town regain, we will give thanks and praise amain.
The wine pot shall clinke, we will feast and drinke.
And then strange motions will abound.
Yet let's be content, and the times lament, you see the world turn'd upside down.

Our Lords and Knights, and Gentry too, doe mean old fashions to forgoe:
They set a porter at the gate, that none must enter in thereat.
They count it a sin, when poor people come in.
Hospitality it selfe is drown'd.
Yet let's be content, and the times lament, you see the world turn'd upside down.

The serving men doe sit and whine, and thinke it long ere dinner time:
The Butler's still out of the way, or else my Lady keeps the key,
The poor old cook, in the larder doth look,
Where is no goodnesse to be found,
Yet let's be content, and the times lament, you see the world turn'd upside down.

To conclude, I'le tell you news that's right, Christmas was kil'd at Naseby fight:
Charity was slain at that same time, Jack Tell troth too, a friend of mine,
Likewise then did die, rost beef and shred pie,
Pig, Goose and Capon no quarter found.
Yet let's be content, and the times lament, you see the world turn'd upside down.

== Recordings ==
This song was recorded by Maddy Prior with The Carnival Band on their album Hang Up Sorrow and Care.

== Cultural references ==
A different song with the same title was written by Leon Rosselson, and made popular by Billy Bragg.

Another song also called "The World Turned Upside Down" is sung by Chumbawamba on their album English Rebel Songs 1381-1984.

The song is referenced in the novel Burr by Gore Vidal.

This song is referenced in the 2015 Broadway musical Hamilton in the song "Yorktown (The World Turned Upside Down)".

In 1972, the Marxist historian Christopher Hill published The World Turned Upside Down: Radical Ideas During the English Revolution ISBN 0-85117-025-0. In a review of this book for the publisher Routledge historians Harman Bhogal and Liam Haydon wrote:

Traditional interpretations of the English Civil War concentrated heavily on a top-down analysis of the doings of king and parliament. Hill looked at "history from below",... It forced a generation of historians to re-evaluate the things they thought they knew about a key pivot point in British history – and went on to influence the generations that came after them.

In 2019 a sculpture by Mark Wallinger titled "The World Turned Upside Down" was unveiled on the campus of the London School of Economics. It is a political globe with the south pole on top. It is 4 metres (13 ft) in diameter and displays the nations and borders of the United Nations.

The song is repeatedly referred to in Robertson Davies' novel Murther and Walking Spirits as being popular among loyalists during the American revolution.

== See also ==
- English Civil War
