= Copsale =

Hamlet in West Sussex, England

Coordinates: 51.01151°N 0.33156°W

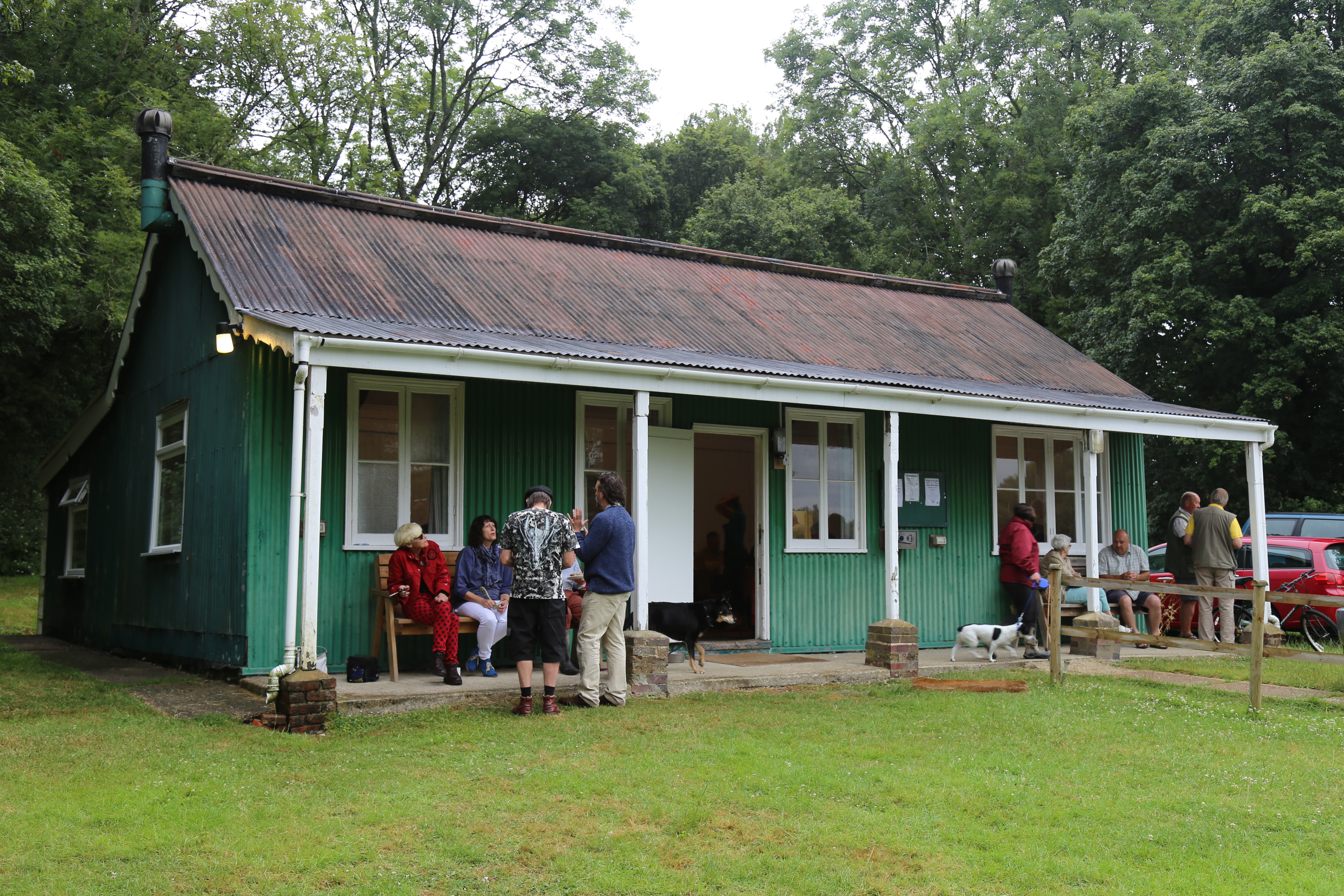
- Copsale Hall

- Location within West Sussex
- OS grid reference: TQ171248
- Civil parish: Nuthurst
- District: Horsham
- Shire county: West Sussex
- Region: South East
- Country: England
- Sovereign state: United Kingdom
- Police: Sussex
- Fire: West Sussex
- Ambulance: South East Coast
- UK Parliament: Horsham

Copsale is a hamlet in the civil parish of Nuthurst, and the Horsham District of West Sussex, England. It lies on the Southwater to Maplehurst road 3.5 miles (6 km) south of Horsham.
