= Nuthurst =

Village and parish in West Sussex, England

Coordinates: 51.02263°N 0.30076°W

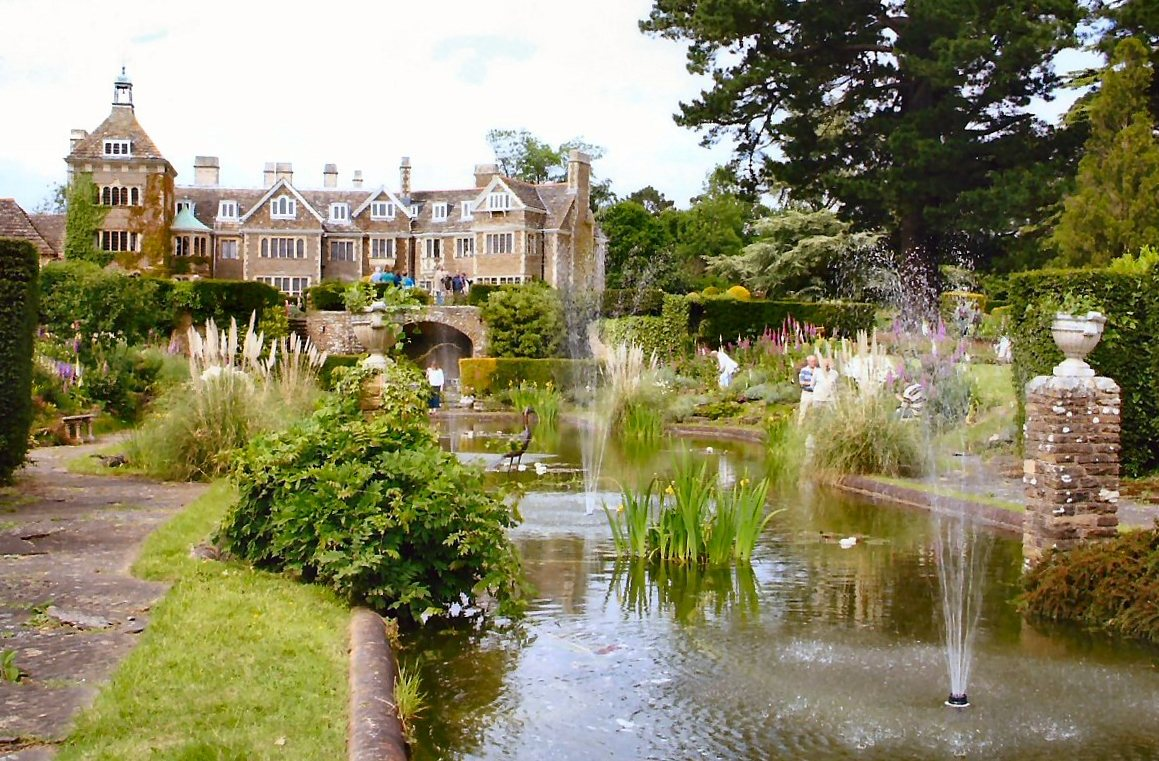
- Sedgwick Park

- Location within West Sussex
- Area: 16.97 km^{2} (6.55 sq mi)
- Population: 1,711 2001 Census; 1,777 (civil parish 2011)
  - Density: 101/km^{2} (260/sq mi)
- OS grid reference: TQ192261
  - London: 34 miles (55 km) NNE
- Civil parish: Nuthurst
- District: Horsham
- Shire county: West Sussex
- Region: South East
- Country: England
- Sovereign state: United Kingdom
- Post town: HORSHAM
- Postcode district: RH13
- Dialling code: 01403
- Police: Sussex
- Fire: West Sussex
- Ambulance: South East Coast
- UK Parliament: Horsham

Nuthurst is a village and civil parish in the Horsham district of West Sussex, England. The north of the parish borders Horsham town, with Nuthurst village 3 miles (5 km) south from the border. Within the parish is the estate and largely 19th-century country house of Sedgwick Park.

== History ==
Nuthurst does not appear in the Domesday Book of 1086. According to A Dictionary of British Place Names, the place is recorded in 1228 as 'Nothurst', meaning "wooded hill where nut-trees grow", from the Old English hnutu + hyrst.

Nuthurst manor, and later parish, since before the Norman Conquest of England has been part of the Singlegross Hundred of the Rape of Bramber.

In 1855 the parish was of 3,460 acres (14 km^{2}). The 1841 population was listed as 768; the 1851 population as 727. Nuthurst occupations in 1855 included 21 farmers, one of whom was a grocer at Mannings Heath, a charcoal burner, a carpenter, a blacksmith, a shoemaker, a baker, a shopkeeper who held the post office, two wheelwrights, one of whom operated at Mannings Heath, and the publicans of The Black Horse Inn at Nuthurst village, who was also one of the 21 farmers, and The Dun Horse Inn at Mannings Heath. Also recorded was a miller of Nuthurst Mill. The benefice of Nuthurst ecclesiastical parish was a rectory in gift of the Bishop of Chichester. The local magistrate was James Tuder Nelthorpe. The parish in 1851 was of 3,260 acres (13 km^{2}), with traders in including 20 farmers, one who ran The Black Horse and one at Mannings Heath, a miller, two blacksmiths in the same family, a charcoal burner, a grocer, and a shopkeeper who also ran the post office. The publican at The Dun Horse was also a butcher.

Nuthurst Mill, alternatively Bircham Mill, or Birchen Bridge Mill was a watermill for corn on the River Arun at the north of the parish and the border with Horsham, just west from today's A281 Brighton Road which runs over the mill's dam. Before 1715 the mill had operated an iron forge, using power from the large lake of the dammed Arun as its mill pond. The iron forge was recorded in the 16th and 17th centuries, as was a parish iron-ore digger in 1588; Sedgwick manor had at that time gained a lease from The Crown to dig for iron ore on its land. From about 1715 Nuthurst Mill became a watermill for corn, still working in 1937 although not waterpowered. The mill became derelict soon after 1937, and its remains were standing until at least 1956, after which they were demolished. A second parish watermill in Copsale is shown on an 1840s OS map; demolished before 1981 after ceasing to operate by 1896.

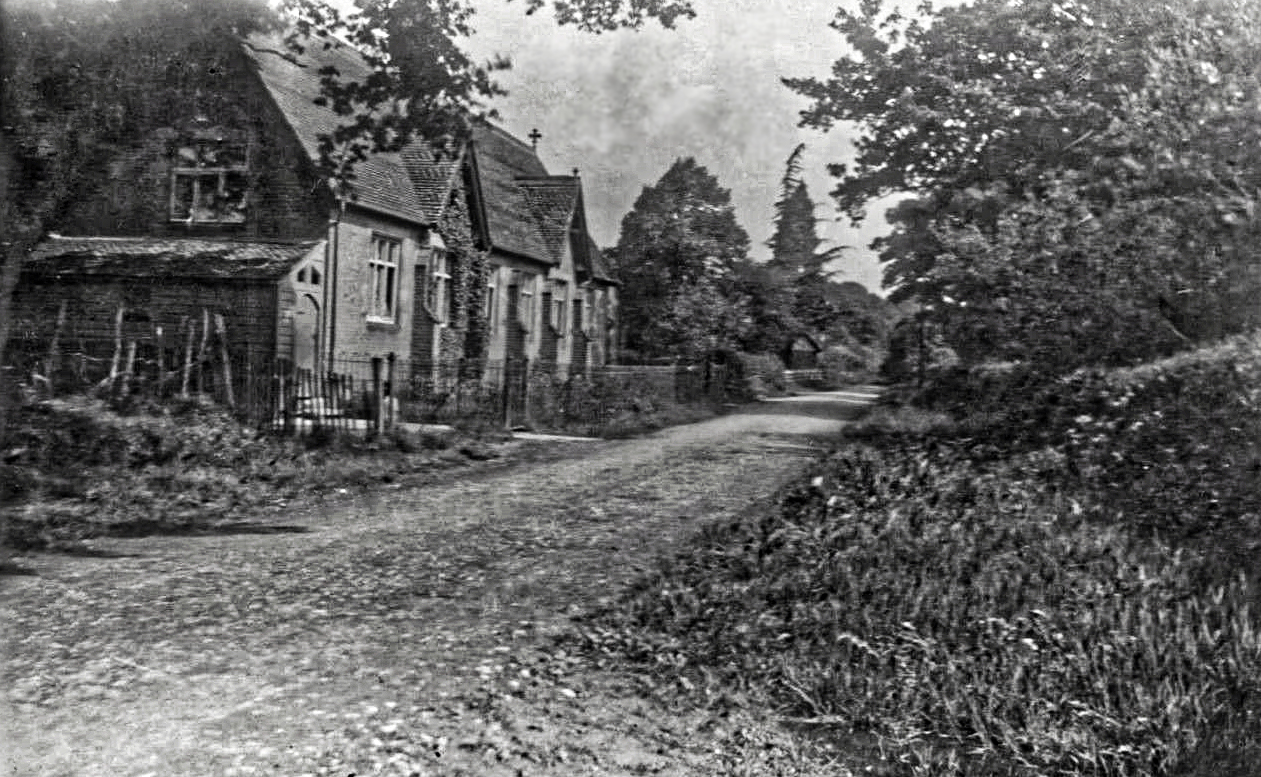
Nuthurst School in the 19th century

By 1861, in parish land that had reduced by 200 acres to 3,260 acres (13 km^{2}), the population was 767. Nuthurst parish poor law provision was then under the Horsham Union, formed in 1835 to concentrate the poor relief of ten Horsham district parishes.

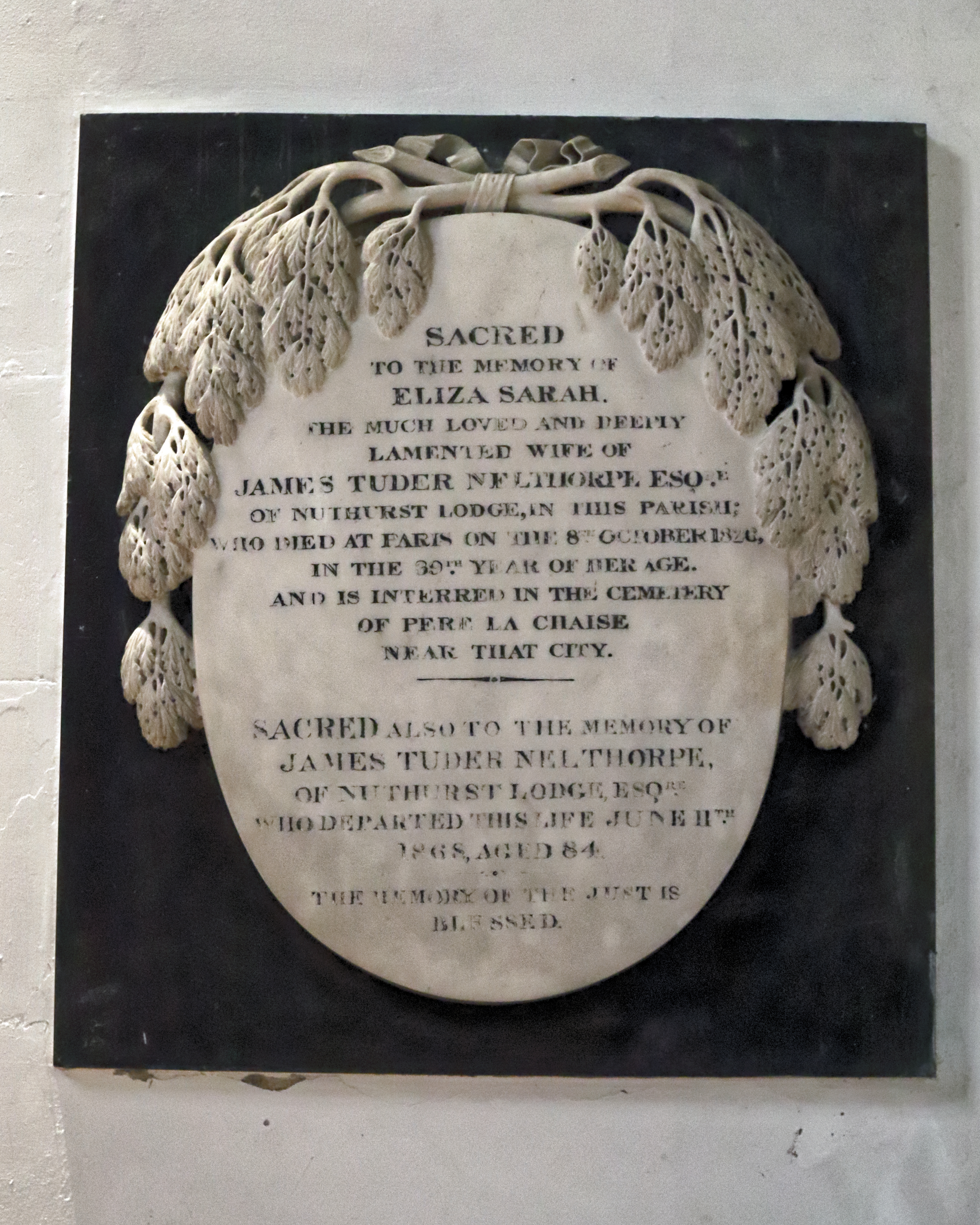
Memorial to Nelthorpe and his wife in St Andrew’s Church

Occupations in the parish had by 1866 included 22 farmers, one of whom was a grocer, a blacksmith, two wheelwrights, a baker & shopkeeper, a boot & shoemaker, a land steward, a land & timber valuer, and the publicans of the Black Horse and Dun Horse inns. St Andrew's parish church was enlarged in 1856 at a cost of £2,400, finance provided by the rector, parish inhabitants including James Tuder Nelthorpe of Nuthurst Lodge, and £100 from the Society for Promoting the Building and Enlargement of Churches and Chapels. A rectory was built in 1859. There was a National School for boys and girls associated with the church. The parish registers date to 1535.

In 1878 parish land was described as soil of partly clay areas and partly sand, on which was grown chiefly wheat, oats, peas and roots. Population by 1871 had reduced to 699, with occupations including 19 farmers, one of whom was a blacksmith at Mannings Heath, and one a grocer, three shopkeepers, a carpenter, a bootmaker, a wheelwright at Mannings Heath, the miller at Bircham Bridge, two farm bailiffs, and four beer retailers, one of whom was a shopkeeper. The Black Horse and Dun Horse inns had been joined by The White Horse Inn at Maplehurst, there now being three parish pubs and publicans.

The ecclesiastical benefice was now in the gift of the Bishop of London. In 1869 a Wesleyan chapel had been built on Mannings Heath common, and by 1878 there was a chapel of ease at Copsale, brick built with a nave and bell turret. Nuthurst Lodge, previously the home of James Tuder Nelthorpe, was owned by Robert Henderson of Sedgwick Park, but unoccupied. The Lord of the manor was Robert Henry Hurst, the former MP for Horsham. Robert Henderson and Sir Walter Wyndham Burrell, 5th Baronet were two of the four chief landowners in the parish.

By 1890 parish area had increased by 340 acres to 3,601 acres (15 km^{2}), An 1881 population of 811 was an increase of 142 over 1871. This population included a reduced number of 14 farmers, one also an assistant overseer, and one a grocer, two farm bailiffs, two wheelwrights, a boot maker, a wood dealer, four shopkeepers, one of whom was also a carpenter, the Birchen Bridge miller, a plumber at Mannings Heath, three beer retailers, the publicans of The Black Horse, White Horse and Dun Horse inns, the latter at Mannings Heath also a wheelwright and blacksmith who provided accommodation for cyclists. There was general shoeing and jobbing smith and edge tool maker at Maplehurst and Lower Beeding.

In 1890 the ecclesiastical parish was in the rural deanery of Storrington and the archdeaconry and Diocese of Chichester. The parish priest, Rev. John Ommaney McCarogher, was a prebendary of Bury in Chichester Cathedral, and the chaplain to Charles Henry Gordon-Lennox, 6th Duke of Richmond. His benefice was in the gift of the then Bishop of London, Frederick Temple. St Andrew's Church contained sitting for 400, which included three faculty pews – seating reserved for church officials. The Copsale Chapel of Ease is recorded as of 115 sittings. Joining the 1869 Wesleyan chapel at Mannings Heath common was a further chapel, Mission church of the Good Shepherd, erected in 1881 with seating for 100. A further parish National School for boys and girls was built at Mannings Heath in 1863. Swallowfield (house) in the parish was the residence of Norman MacLeod of MacLeod. Sir Charles Raymond Burrell, 6th Baronet was one of the five chief landowners.

At the turn of the 20th century, parish land was of 3,489 acres (14 km^{2}) and 21 acres (0.1 km^{2}) of water. Land use remained the same, with the 1891 population being 853 in the civil, and 814 in the ecclesiastical parish. In 1877 the settlement of Little Broadwater, with seven houses and 39 people, had been annexed from the civil parish of Southwater.

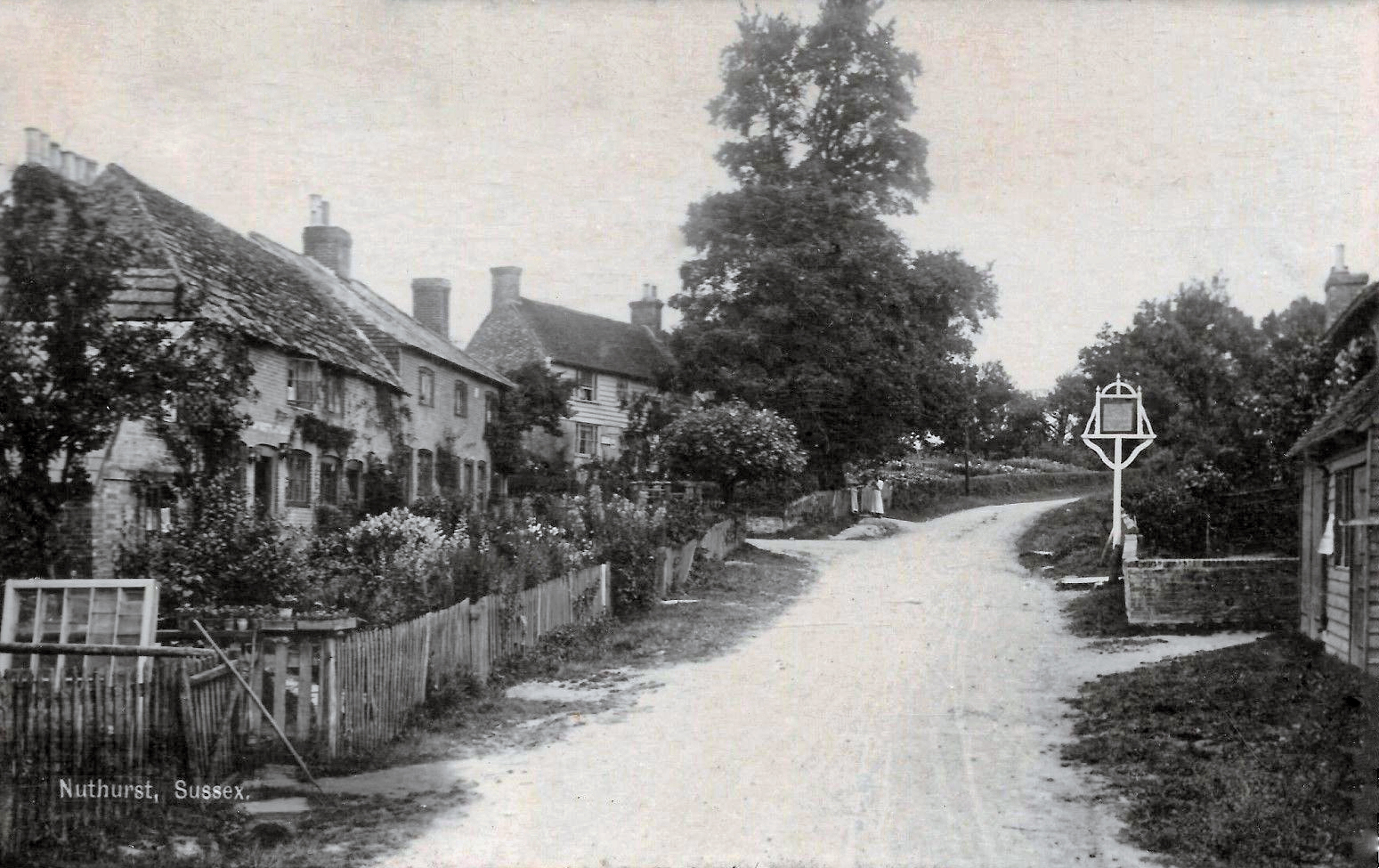
Nuthurst village in the early 20th century

In 1899, Nuthurst occupations included a jobbing gardener, a boot maker, and two farm bailiffs. There were 16 farmers, one of whom was a stud owner, one an assistant overseer, and one being a poultry and dairy farmer at Monks Gate. There was a builder at Monks Gate. At Maplehurst was a combined grocer, baker, tea and provision merchant & meat salesman, and a combined general shoemaker and jobbing smith. At Copsale were three beer retailers, one of whom was a grocer. The Birchen Bridge miller was still operating. In Mannings Heath was a stone merchant at The Quarry, an earthenware dealer who ran the Post Office, a gamekeeper, a gardener, a grocer & plumber, and two wheelwrights, one of whom was also a blacksmith. Publicans were still at the White, Black and Dun Horse inns. Robert Henry Hurst of Horsham Park was still Lord of Manor, and Sir Charles Raymond Burrell, 6th Baronet of Knepp Castle, then in Shipley, was one of seven chief landowners of the parish.

St Andrew's Church in Nuthurst village was enlarged in 1898, during which a Norman window was discovered in the north wall of the chancel. The benefice of the ecclesiastical parish was again in the gift of the Bishop of London, at this time being Mandell Creighton. A new house for the parish curate was built at Mannings Heath in 1894. Joining the Mission church of the Good Shepherd and Wesleyan chapel at Mannings Heath was a Congregational chapel. Copsale Chapel of Ease, dedicated to the Holy Trinity, remained. The National School in Nuthurst was enlarged to take 160 children in 1894; Mannings Heath National School was enlarged to take 100 children in 1874.

Nuthurst land area and use in 1915 remained as 15 years earlier, although 1911 population had reduced from that in 1901: by 96 (to 757) in the civil, and 83 (to 731) in the ecclesiastical parish.

Fourteen farms, one still being a stud farm, remained from 1899; there were three farm bailiffs. Still operating was a miller at Birchen Bridge, as were publicans at the White, Black and Dun Horse inns. A bootmaker ran the Post Office. A plumber was still in Mannings Heath, as was a builder at Monks Gate, but only one beer retailer remained in Copsale. There was a blacksmith, a wheelwright and a grocer at Maplehurst. A further grocer, and one of two parish carpenters, traded at Mannings Heath. A shopkeeper was trading at Monks Gate. Arthur Reginald Hurst had become Lord of Manor, and Sir Merrik Raymond Burrell 7th baronet was one of four parish chief landowners.

St Andrew's Church was again restored in 1907 by A.H. Skipworth and John Samuel Alder, when a new organ was added by Bishop & Son, all at a cost of £1,400. The Chapel of Ease at Copsale was restored in 1915 at a cost of £400. A new Parish Hall was built at Mannings Heath in 1901.

== Geography and demography ==
Nuthurst parish is approximately 35 miles (60 km) south from London, and 25 miles (40 km) north-east from the county town of Chichester. The parish is towards the north and at the east of the Horsham district of West Sussex.

Parish land area is 4,191 acres (1,697 hectares). Apart from six nucleated settlements and dispersed residential properties, the parish is entirely rural and agricultural, delineated by farms and woods. Settlements are the parish village of Nuthurst, approximately at the centre, Mannings Heath, a dormitory for Horsham and the largest parish village at the north-east, and the hamlets of Monk's Gate between Nuthurst village and Mannings Heath, Copsale and Maplehurst at the south, and Sedgwick, a hamlet attached to Sedgwick Park to the west. The only major road in the parish is the Horsham to Brighton A281 that runs through Mannings Heath.

Adjacent parishes are Horsham (town) at the north, Colgate at the north-east, Lower Beeding at the east, Cowfold at the south-east, West Grinstead at the south, Shipley at the south-west, and Southwater at the west. The River Arun forms the northern border between Nuthurst and Horsham.

In the 2001 census 1,711 people lived in 702 households, of whom 875 were economically active. At the 2011 Census the population had increased slightly to 1,777.

== Community ==
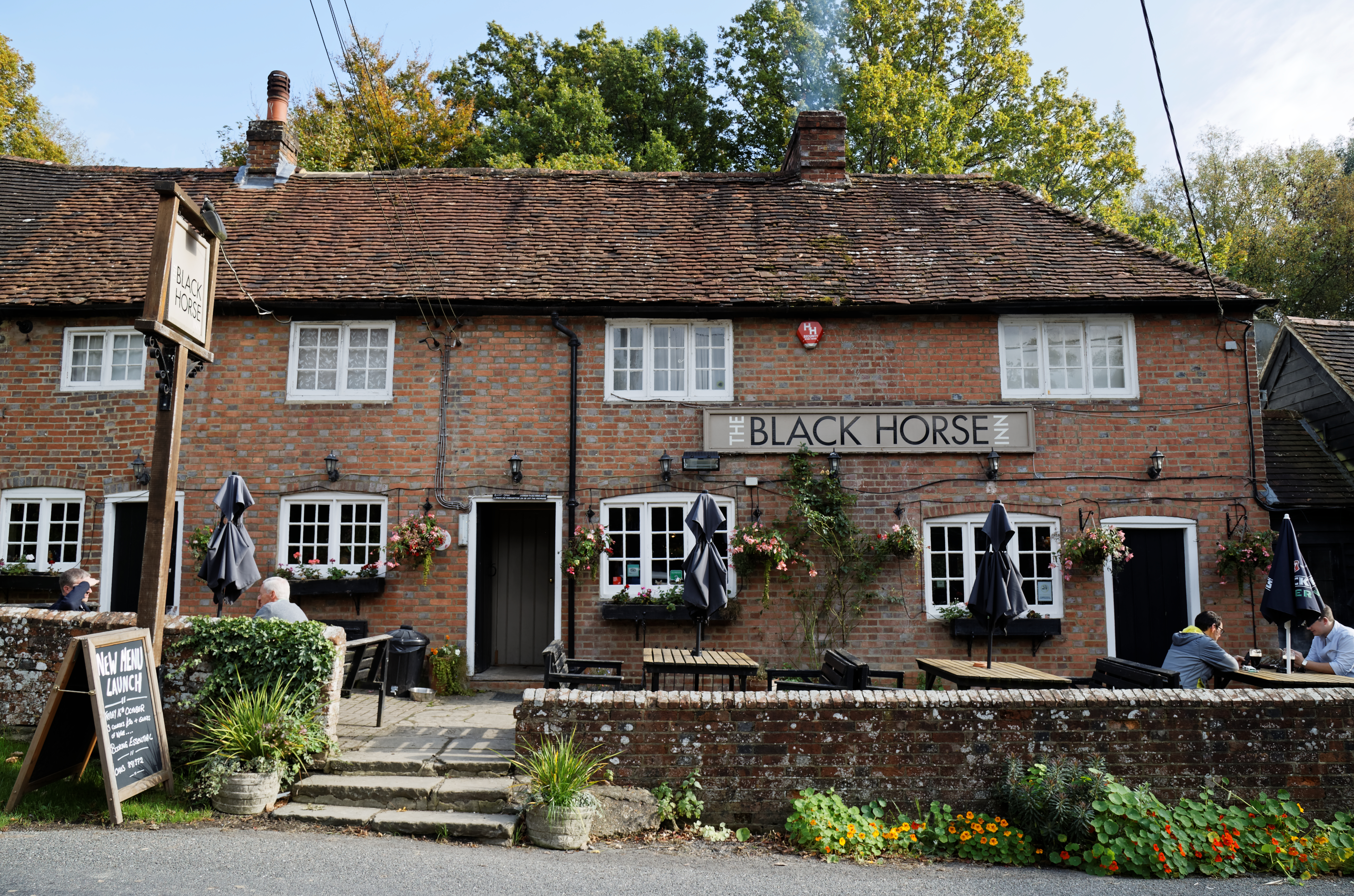
Black Horse Inn, Nuthurst village

Nuthurst parish governance is through a parish council.

The parish has two public houses, the Black Horse Inn at Nuthurst village, and the White Horse Inn at Maplehurst – the Dun Horse Inn at Mannings Heath is now closed. A village store & delicatessen, and a garage services company is at Mannings Heath. There are two churches: the Church of England parish church of St Andrew's with its nearby associated St Andrew's C of E–aided school in Nuthurst village, and the Church of the Good Shepherd in Mannings Heath. There are two village halls, one at Copsale and one at Mannings Heath. The parish cricket team, Nuthurst CC, play at Mannings Heath common. Mannings Heath Golf Club & Wine Estate is headquartered within the north-east of the parish, with its course largely in the parish of Colgate.

A Nuthurst landmark is Sedgwick Park, approximately 2 miles (3 km) south from Horsham, a largely 19th-century house but with one wing possibly dating from 1608. In the grounds are the fragmentary remains of the medieval Sedgwick Castle, surrounded by a now mostly dry moat.
