= The World Turned Upside Down (sculpture) =

Sculpture by Mark Wallinger, on Sheffield Street, London

Coordinates: 51.5144°N 0.1174°W

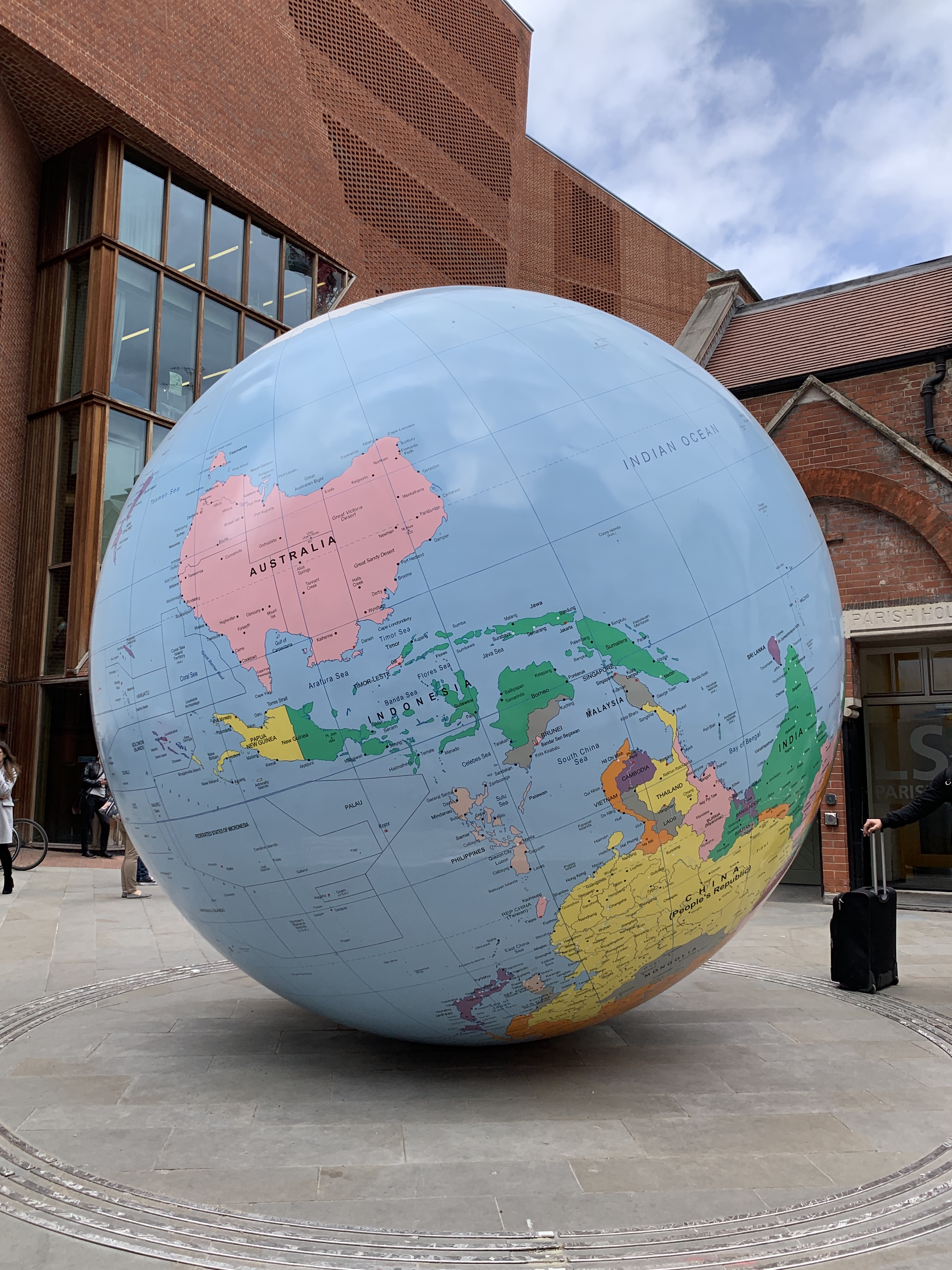
The World Turned Upside Down

The World Turned Upside Down is a sculpture by the Turner Prize-winning artist Mark Wallinger, on Sheffield Street, London, within the campus of the London School of Economics. The name World Turned Upside Down comes from a 17th-century English ballad. The sculpture, measuring 13 feet (4 m) in diameter, features a globe resting on its North Pole and was unveiled in March 2019. It reportedly cost over £200,000, which was funded by alumni donations.

== Disputed content ==
The artwork attracted controversy for showing the island of Taiwan as a sovereign entity, rather than as part of the People’s Republic of China. After dueling protests by students from both the PRC and ROC and reactions by third party observers (which included the President of Taiwan, Taiwanese Ministry of Foreign Affairs and the co-chairs of the British-Taiwanese All-Party Parliamentary Group in the House of Commons) the university decided later that year (2019) that it would retain the original design which chromatically displayed the PRC and ROC as different entities but with the addition of an asterisk beside the name of Taiwan and a corresponding placard that clarified the institution's position regarding the controversy.

A group of students repeatedly vandalised the globe for its omission of the state of Palestine, a non-member observer state in the United Nations. The globe features Jerusalem marked as the capital of Israel, instead of the internationally recognised capital of Tel-Aviv (including by the UK).

== Gallery ==
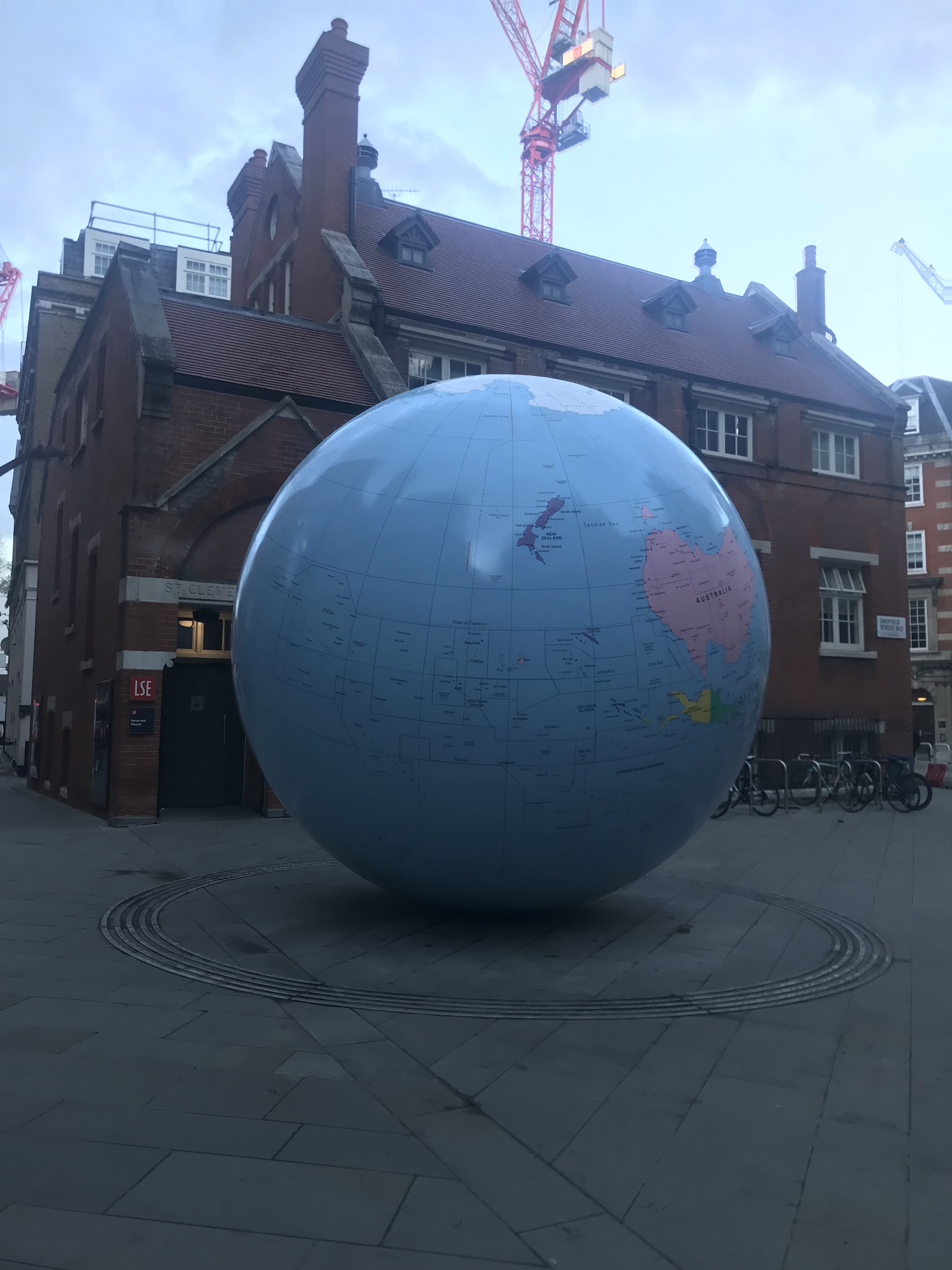
The World Turned Upside Down from a different angle

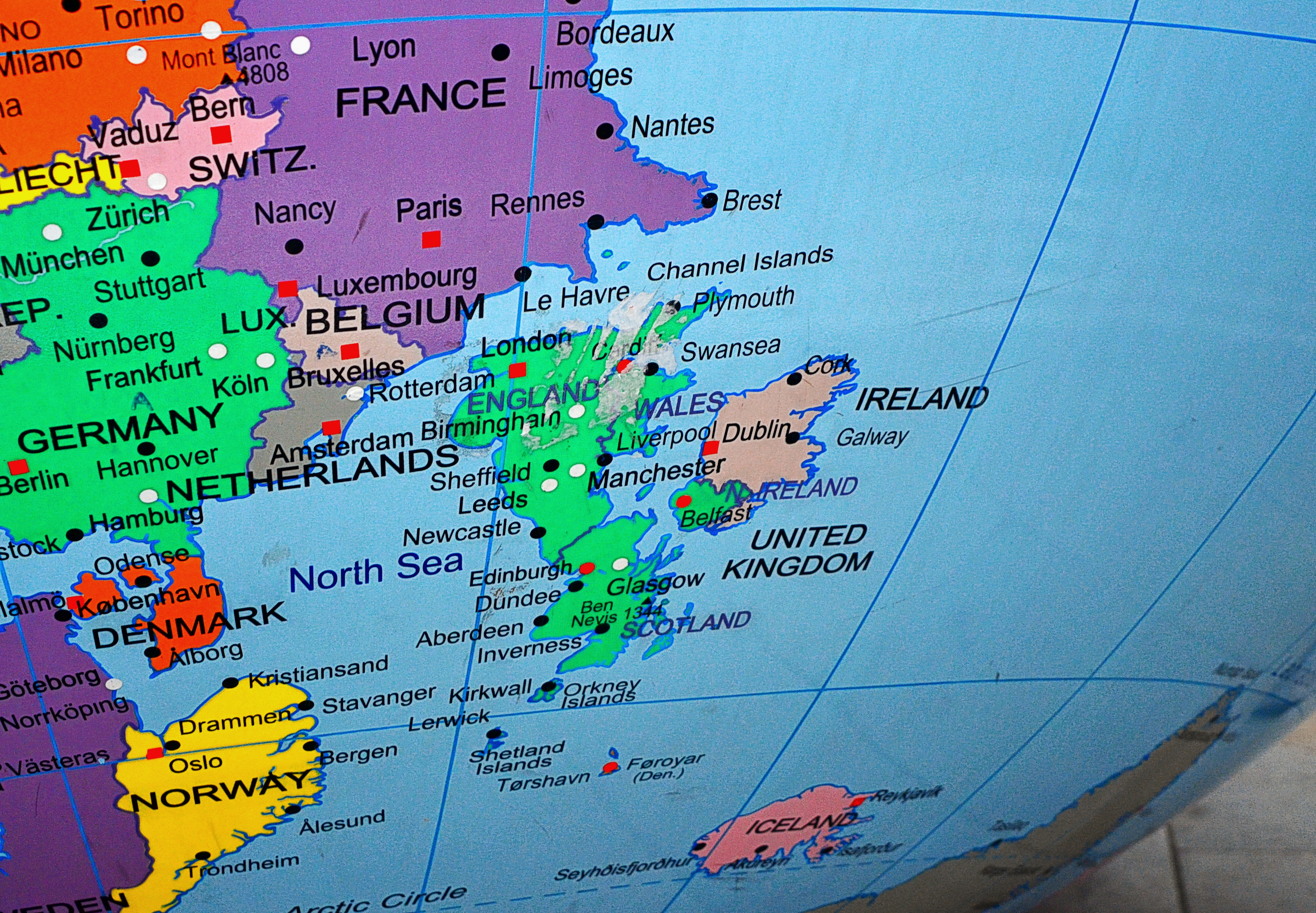
Detail of the sculpture, showing northwestern Europe and the British Isles

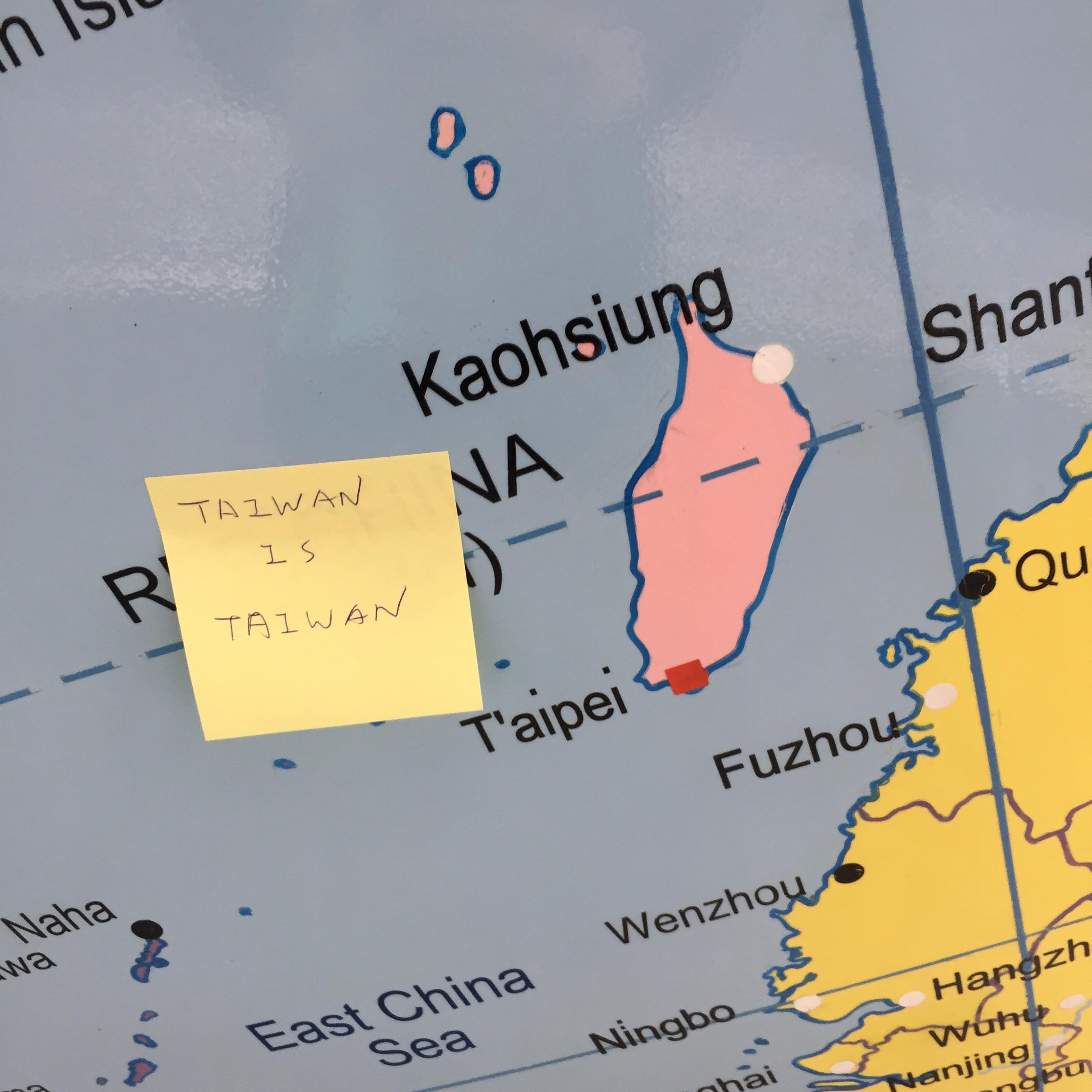
"Taiwan is Taiwan"

== See also ==
- Political status of Taiwan
- Sino-Indian border dispute
- Tibetan sovereignty debate
- Israeli–Palestinian conflict
