= Yorktown (The World Turned Upside Down) =

Song in the musical "Hamilton"

Song by original Broadway cast of Hamilton

from the album Hamilton
- Released: 2015
- Genre: Hip hop; show tune
- Length: 4:02
- Songwriter: Lin-Manuel Miranda

Audio
- "Yorktown (The World Turned Upside Down)" on YouTube

"Yorktown (The World Turned Upside Down)" is the twentieth song from Act 1 of the musical Hamilton, based on the life of Alexander Hamilton, which premiered on Broadway in 2015. Lin-Manuel Miranda wrote both the music and lyrics to the song. It recounts the story of the Battle of Yorktown.

== Synopsis ==
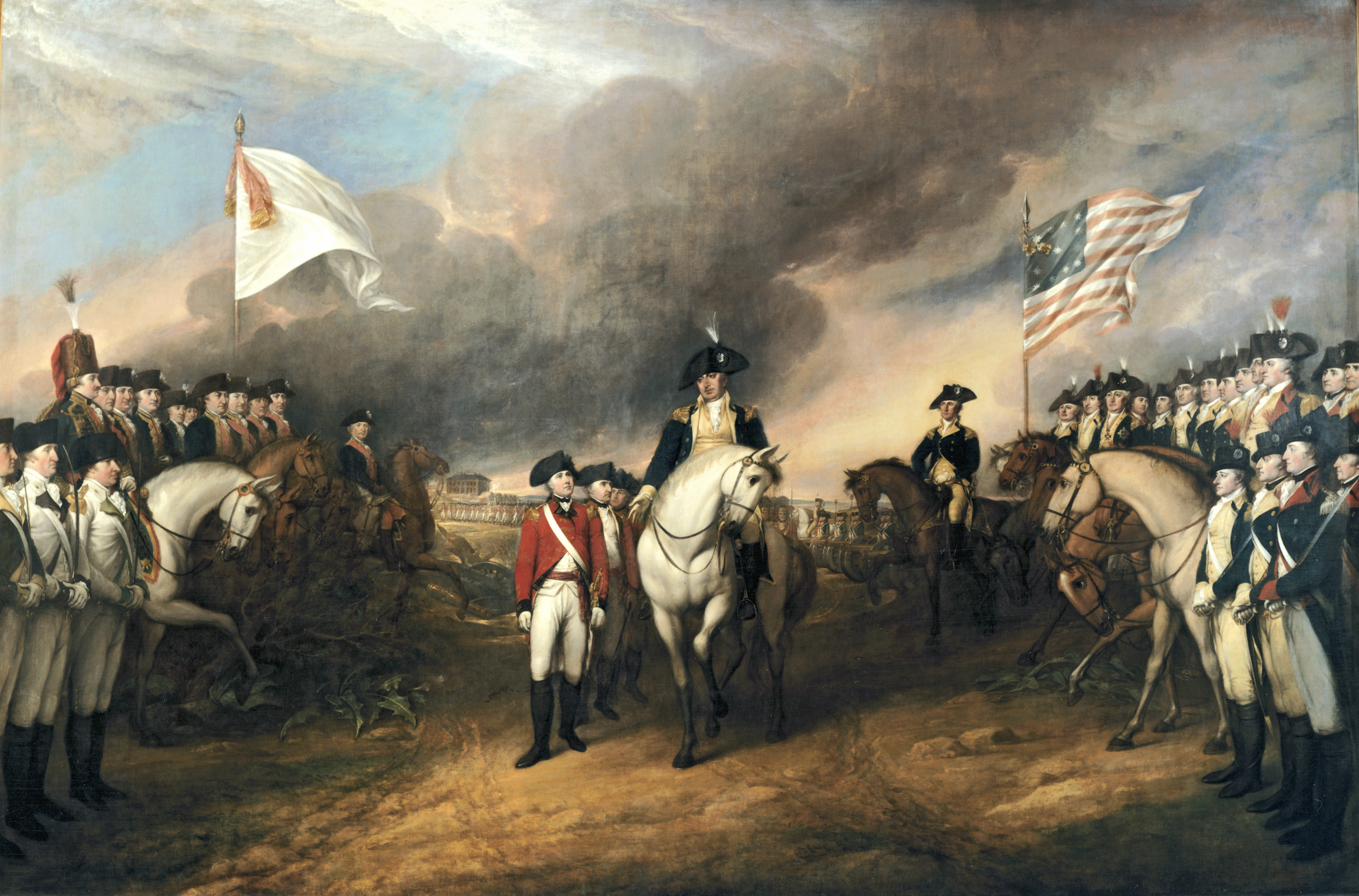
The Surrender of Lord Cornwallis, an 1820 painting by John Trumbull depicting the surrender of the British to French forces.

The song begins with Alexander Hamilton, having been promoted to a command position in the Continental Army by George Washington, meeting with his friend Marquis de Lafayette and discussing their plans after the impending conclusion of the war. It is revealed that Hamilton's friend Hercules Mulligan was spying on the British forces to give information to the American forces. Hamilton also remarks on his wife and her pregnancy with their first child, and how John Laurens went to South Carolina in an effort to form a black battalion of soldiers. The Continental Forces then proceed to begin fighting, with Hamilton ordering his three battalions to remove the bullets from their firearms before their assault on British Redoubts 9 and 10. The Americans, assisted by the French, succeed in the battle, with their opponents waving a white flag. Hamilton then describes the British retreat, saying that he heard "the drinking song they were singing."

== Analysis ==
The song takes its title from an English ballad, which according to legend was performed by the British army band on the orders of Lord Cornwallis during their retreat. Whether or not this is historically accurate is not known, as it was incorporated into the story a century after the siege.

Much of the song, particularly towards its beginning, functions as a reprise of "My Shot", as Hamilton remarks on how potential death lies ahead. The song contains a hint of "Lose Yourself" by Eminem, as well as a lyrical reference to A Tribe Called Quest's track "Jazz (We've Got)," one of many callbacks in the musical to hip-hop and rap.

== Critical reception ==
The Young Folks ranked the song 27th best in the musical.

Elizabeth Logan, writing for Huffington Post, stated that the song was a "rollicking remix", while Vibe.com said that the song gave the audience the opportunity to "hear the perseverance of the soldiers in the war".

== Performances ==
The original Broadway cast, having been introduced by Barack and Michelle Obama, performed the song, as well as its immediate predecessor, at the 70th Tony Awards prior to winning eleven awards. However, following the 2016 Orlando nightclub shooting, they did not use muskets out of respect.

== Certifications ==
| Region | Certification | Certified units/sales |
|---|---|---|
| United Kingdom (BPI) | Silver | 200,000^{‡} |
| United States (RIAA) | Platinum | 1,000,000^{‡} |
^{‡} Sales+streaming figures based on certification alone.

== "Immigrants (We Get the Job Done)" ==
"Immigrants (We Get the Job Done)"

Song by K'naan, Snow tha Product, Riz MC, and Residente

from the album The Hamilton Mixtape
- Released: 2016
- Genre: Hip hop
- Length: 4:41

Music video
- "Immigrants (We Get The Job Done)" on YouTube

A rap song inspired by and sampling from "Yorktown" was recorded for The Hamilton Mixtape. The song took inspiration from the line shared between Hamilton and Lafayette—"Immigrants—we get the job done". It was performed by K'naan, Snow tha Product, Riz MC (Riz Ahmed) and Residente. Miranda selected those performers as they represent all corners of the world, in line with the song's message. It also incorporates Washington's line from the original—"Not yet", which Miranda said meant that America has yet to achieve full freedom as a society.

Slate.com considered the new take on the song to be the best on the mixtape.

A music video was released in June 2017. The song was nominated for "Best Fight Against the System" at the 2017 MTV Video Music Awards and shared the win with the other five nominees.

The song peaked at number 22 on the Rap Digital Song Sales chart.
