= Dufay Collective =

The Dufay Collective is an early-music ensemble from the United Kingdom, specializing in Medieval and Renaissance music. Founded in 1987, it was named after the Renaissance composer Guillaume Dufay. The group is directed by William Lyons. Group size and personnel varies according to the needs of the project.

== Members List ==
When the ensemble started, it was:

- Paul Bevan (b 8 December 1962) – slide trumpet, recoder, pipe and tabor, percussion
- Giles Lewin (b 31 December 1956) – vielle, rebec, gittern, shawm, pipe and tabor
- William Lyons (b 13 May 1964) – flute, recorder, bagpipes, shawm, pipe and tabor
- Raphael Mizraki (b 19 May 1962) – lutes, rebec, percussion
- Susanna Pell (b 24 September 1964) – vielle, percussion
- Peter Skuce (b October 1959) – harp, organ, percussion

Other members of the ensemble have included:

- Jacob Heringman – lute
- Vivien Ellis – vocals
- Rebecca Austen-Brown
- Jon Banks

Notable guest performers have included:

- Catherine King
- John Potter
- Richard Campbell
- David Miller

== CD Discography ==
- A L'Estampida: medieval dance music (1991) - described by the BBC as "influential".
- A Dance in the Garden of Mirth: medieval instrumental music (1994)
- Miri It Is: songs and instrumental music from medieval England (1995)
- Johnny, Cock thy Beaver: popular music-making in 17th century England (1996)
- On the Banks of the Seine: music of the trouvères (1997)
- Miracles: 13th century Spanish songs in Praise of the Virgin Mary (1997)
- Cancionero - Music for the Spanish Court 1470-1520 (2002) - Grammy nominated in the 'Best Small Ensemble Performance' category.
- Music for Alfonso the Wise (2005)
- A L'Estampida - 15¾th Anniversary Edition (2005)
- The Play of Daniel (2008)
- To Drive The Cold Winter Away (2012)
- I Have Set My Hert So Hy (2015)

The group has also collaborated for several movie soundtracks, including those of Hamlet, The Affair of the Necklace, A Knight's Tale, and Harry Potter and the Prisoner of Azkaban.
