= James Tuder Nelthorpe =

English magistrate

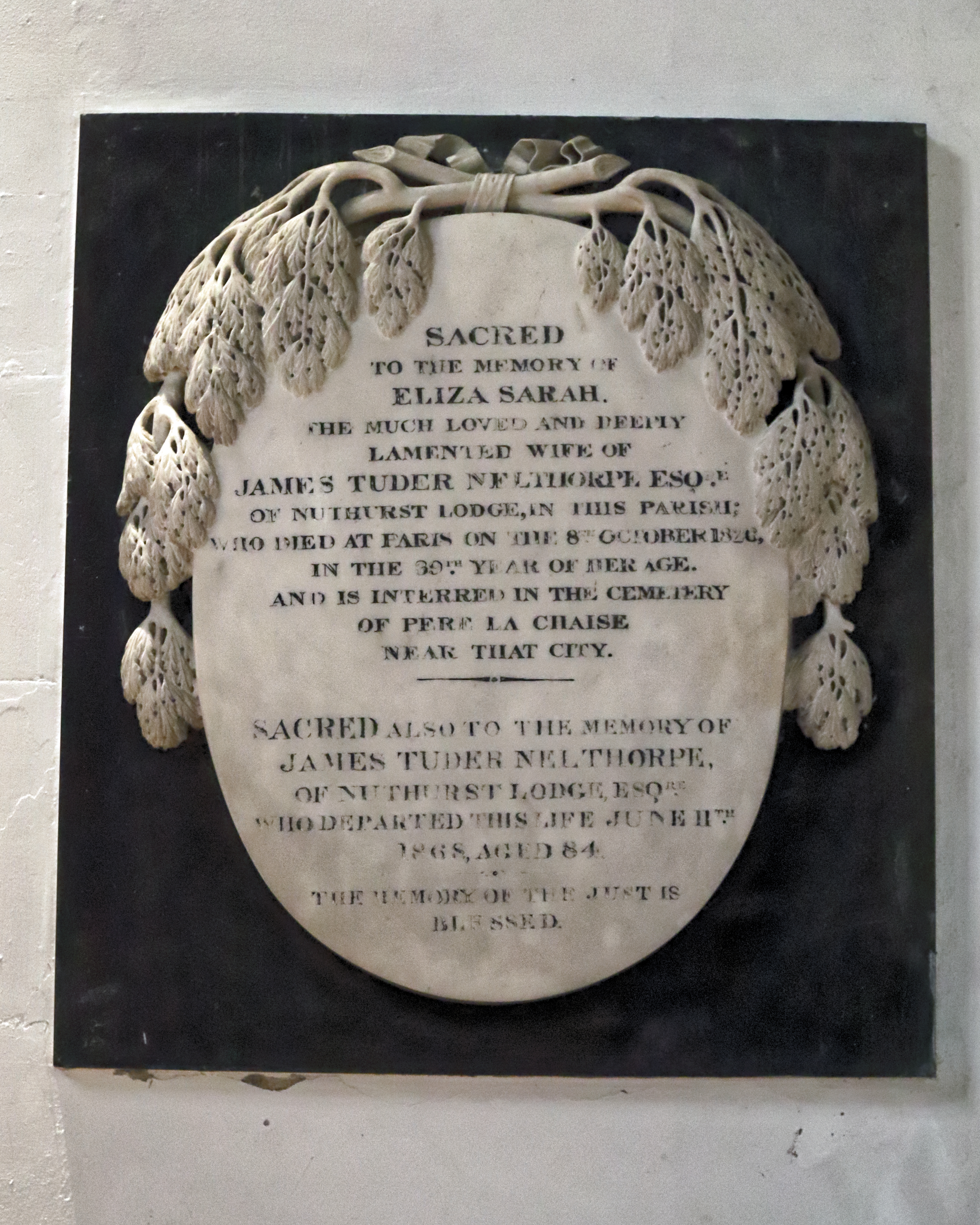
Memorial to Nelthorpe and his wife in the parish church in Nuthurst

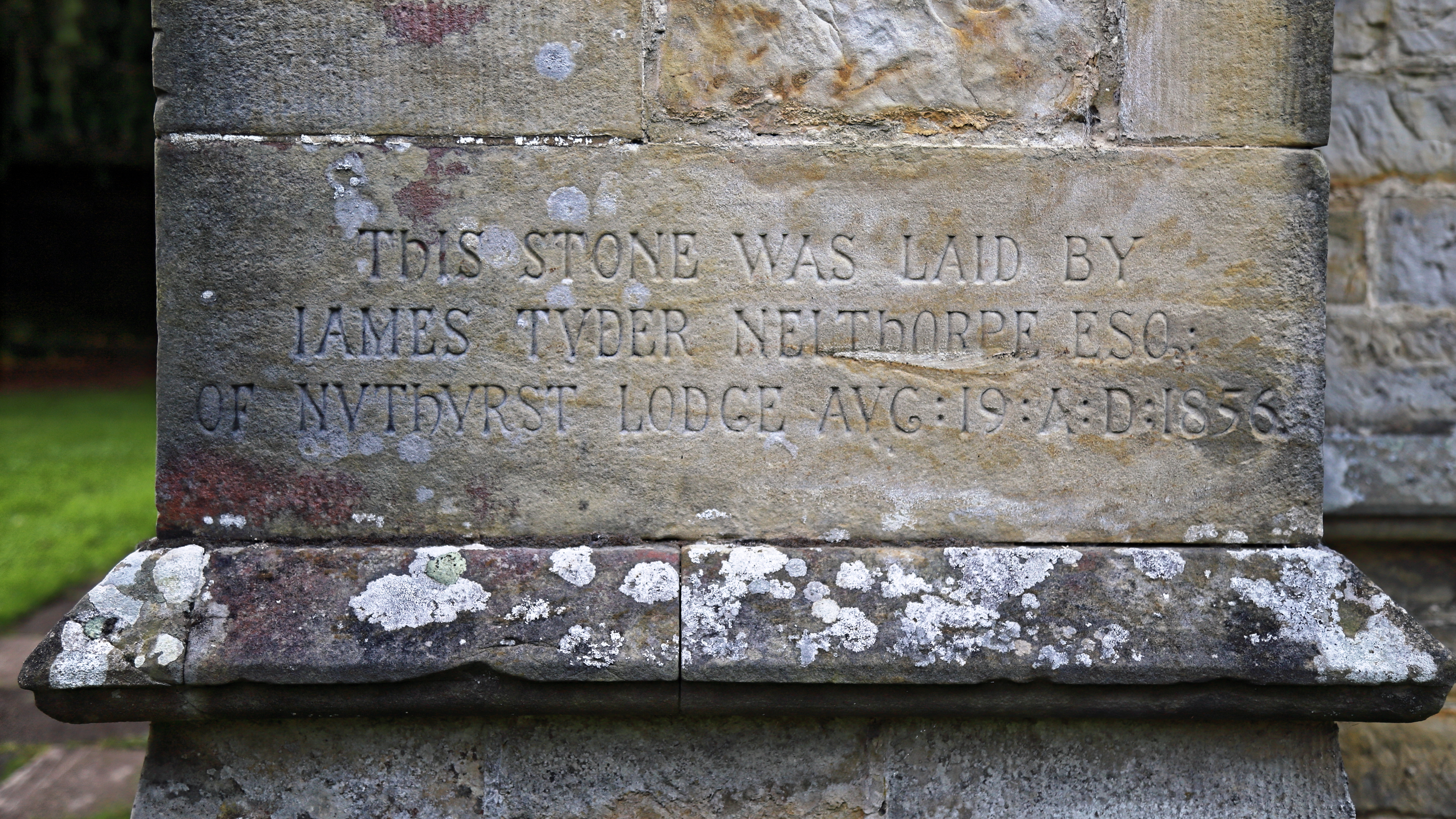
Foundation stone of an extension to the parish church which Nelthorpe helped fund

James Tuder or Tudor Nelthorpe (c.1784 - 11 June 1868) was an English local magistrate and landowner, principally active as a Justice of the Peace in Nuthurst, West Sussex.

Born James Cowne, he took on the surnames Tudor/Tuder and Nelthorpe on inheriting the estate of Sedgwick manor in Little Broadwater from his aunt Elizabeth Nelthorpe. By the 1840s he held almost 900 acres in total in his estates in Nuthurst and Little Broadwater. As of the 1841 census he was living at Nuthurst Lodge with the family of Richard Mayne, then Commissioner of the Metropolitan Police, who later served as one of the executors to Nelthorpe's will.
