= Sussex Carol =

Song

The "Sussex Carol" is a Christmas carol popular in Britain, sometimes referred to by its first line "On Christmas night all Christians sing". Its words were first published by Luke Wadding, a late 17th-century poet and bishop of the Catholic Church in Ireland, in a work called Small Garland of Pious and Godly Songs (1684). It is unclear whether Wadding wrote the song or was recording an earlier composition.

Both the text and the tune to which it is now sung were discovered and written down by Cecil Sharp in Buckland, Gloucestershire, and Ralph Vaughan Williams, who heard it being sung by a Harriet Verrall of Monk's Gate, near Horsham, Sussex (hence "Sussex Carol"). The tune to which it is generally sung today is the one Vaughan Williams took down from Mrs. Verrall and published in 1919.

An earlier version using a different tune and a variation on the first line, "On Christmas night true Christians sing", was published as early as 1878 in Henry Ramsden Bramley and John Stainer's Christmas Carols New and Old. The carol has been arranged by a number of composers. Vaughan Williams' setting is found in his Eight Traditional English Carols. Several years earlier, Vaughan Williams had included the carol in his Fantasia on Christmas Carols, first performed at the 1912 Three Choirs Festival at Hereford Cathedral. Erik Routley's arrangement in the 1961 University Carol Book adds a modal inflection to the setting. The carol often appears at the King's College "Festival of Nine Lessons and Carols", where it is performed in arrangements by either David Willcocks or Philip Ledger, both former directors of music at the chapel. Willcocks's arrangement appears in the first OUP Carols for Choirs.

== Text ==
Instrumental arrangement on synthesisers

A number of variations on the text exist, although all feature the repetition of the first two stanzas. Below is a comparison between the text collected by Cecil Sharp in Gloucestershire, that of Ralph Vaughan Williams in Sussex (the version used in his Fantasia and both the David Willcocks and Philip Ledger arrangements). The version printed by Bramley and Stainer in 1878 is closer to the earliest known version by Luke Wadding from 1684, but it is clear that the original does not fit the modern tune.

Version collected by Cecil Sharp

On Christmas night all Christians sing
To hear what news those angels bring;
News of great joy, news of great mirth,
News of our Saviour King's own birth.

Then why should men on earth be so sad
Since our Redeemer made us glad,
When from sin He set us free
All for to gain our liberty.

Now sin depart, behold His grace,
Everlasting life comes in its place,
And soon we shall its terror see
And poor and rich must conquered be.

Then out of darkness we see light,
Which makes all angels to sing this night
Glory to God and peace to men
Both now and evermore. Amen.

Version collected by Ralph Vaughan Williams

On Christmas night all Christians sing
To hear the news the angels bring.
News of great joy, news of great mirth,
News of our merciful King's birth.

Then why should men on earth be so sad,
Since our Redeemer made us glad,
When from our sin he set us free,
All for to gain our liberty?

When sin departs before His grace,
Then life and health come in its place.
Angels and men with joy may sing
All for to see the new-born King.

All out of darkness we have light,
Which made the angels sing this night:
"Glory to God and peace to men,
Now and for evermore, Amen!"

Version in Christmas Carols New and Old (ca.1870)

On Christmas night true Christians sing
To hear what news the angel bring
News of great joy, cause of great mirth
Good tidings of the Saviour's birth

Angels with joy sing in the air,
No music may with theirs compare;
While prisoners in their chains rejoice
To hear the echoes of that voice.

So how on earth can men be sad,
When Jesus comes to make us glad;
From sin and hell to set us free,
And buy for us our liberty?

Let sin depart, while we His grace,
And glory see in Jesus' face;
For so shall we sure comforts find
When thus this day we bear in mind.

And from the darkness we have light,
Which makes the Angels sing this night:
"Glory to God, His peace to men,
Both now and evermore." Amen.

Version in A Smale Garland (1684)

On Christmas night all Christians sing
To heare what news the Angels bring
News of great Ioy cause of great mirth
News of our mercifull King his birth
The King of Kings of Earth and heaven
The King of Angels and of men
Angels and men with Ioy may sing
To see their new born King.

Angels with Ioy sing in the Ayre
To him who can their ruins repaire
And prissoners in the Limbs rejoyce
To heare the Ecchos of their voice
And how on Earth can man be sad
The Redeemer is come to make them glad
From sin and hell to set them free
And buy their libertie.

Then sin depart behould here's grace
And death here's life come in thy place
Hell now thou mayst thy terror see
Thy power great must Conquer'd be
And for thy darkness we have light
Which makes th Angels sing this night
Glory to God and peace to men
For ever more Amen.

== See also ==
- Music of Sussex
- List of Christmas carols
