= The Carnival Band (folk group) =

English early music group

The Carnival Band is an English early music group. Their broad repertoire focuses on popular music from the 16th and 17th centuries, and traditional music from around the world. Presentation is informal and humorous, and in the spirit of medieval and renaissance Carnival. The band was founded by Andy Watts (principal bassoon in the Orchestra of the Age of Enlightenment) and Giles Lewin (Dufay Collective) while they were members of the Medieval Players touring theatre company in the 1980s. They have had a long association with Maddy Prior.

== History ==
The band was founded in 1983 by Andy Watts and Giles Lewin, together with Bill Badley, after Watts had been the musical director of an open-air Medieval Players production of Rabelais' Gargantua. The show featured actors, giant carnival characters, puppets, acrobatics, juggling and 16th-century music. The three founding members were musicians with the Medieval Players. Together with percussionist Charles Fullbrook the band made their debut on the towpath of the Leeds-Liverpool canal at the Burnley Canalside Festival in 1984. Andrew 'Jub' Davis joined the band for a New Years' concert in 1985 and, according to the band's website "this date marks the band's real birthday."

Although Bill Bradley and Raph Mizraki left in 1999, they both continue to make occasional guest appearances with the band.

Maddy Prior's collaboration with the band began near the start of their existence in 1984 for a BBC radio programme of Christmas carols. Since then, Maddy has featured on most Carnival Band albums. They have co-written material. For example, they wrote and toured a song cycle based on the life of Worcester-born heroine Hannah Snell. Maddy toured with them again in 2007 for their "Music for Tavern and Chapel" tour.

Other performers have appeared on their CDs. For example, Rose Kemp sang on Carols at Christmas and Terry Jones appeared on Ringing the Changes.

== Lineups ==
1983–1984	1984	1985–1990
Andy Watts – woodwinds; Giles Lewin – fiddle; Bill Badley – guitar	Andy Watts – woodwinds; Giles Lewin – fiddle; Bill Badley – guitar; Charles Fullbrook – percussion	Andy Watts – woodwinds; Giles Lewin – fiddle; Bill Badley – guitar; Charles Fullbrook – percussion; Andrew 'Jub' Davis – double bass
1990–1999	1999–2002	2002–present
Andy Watts – woodwinds; Giles Lewin – fiddle, occasional woodwind; Bill Badley – guitars; Raph Mizraki – percussion; Andrew 'Jub' Davis – double bass	Andy Watts – woodwinds; Giles Lewin – fiddle, occasional woodwind; Steve Banks – percussion; Andrew 'Jub' Davis – double bass	Andy Watts – woodwinds; Giles Lewin – fiddle, occasional woodwind; Steno Vitale – guitars; Steve Banks – percussion; Andrew 'Jub' Davis – double bass

== Discography ==
- Hoi Polloi (Park 1999 PRKCD51)
- Live – Jump for Joy (1994)
- My Heart Doth Dance (Park 2007)
- Choral History: Radio Ballards (2008)
- Around the World (2010)
- Capriol's Christmas (2018)

=== with Maddy Prior ===
- A Tapestry of Carols (Saydisc 1986 CD-SDL 366)
- Sing Lustily And With Good Courage (Saydisc 1990 CD-SDL 383)
- Carols and Capers (Park Records 1991 PRKCD9)
- Hang Up Sorrow and Care (1995)
- Carols at Christmas (Park Records 1996 PRKCD45)
- Gold Frankincense and Myrrh (Park Records 2001 PRKCD59)
- An Evening of Carols and Capers (Park Records 2005 DVD PRKDVD87, CD PRKCD86)
- Paradise Found (Park Records 2007 PRKCD94)
- Ringing the Changes (Park Records 2007 PRKCD98)
- Vaughan Williams Carols Songs & Hymns (Park Records 2010 PRKCD111)
- A Christmas Caper: The Best of Maddy Prior & the Carnival Band (Park Records 2012 PRKCD124)

== Instruments played by the band ==
- Sing Lustily
  - Bill Badley: Lute, guitar (19th century original), steel-string guitar, mandolin, mandocello, banjo, vocals
  - Charles Fullbrook: Tabors, side drum, bass drum, cymbals, wood blocks, cowbell, vocals
  - Jub Davis: Double bass
  - Giles Lewin: Violin, recorder (2, 13), vocals
  - Andy Watts: Curtal, bassoon (19th century original), clarinet in C, recorder (2, 7, 14), vocals
- Hang Up Sorrow And Care
  - William Badley (acoustic & electric guitars, baroque guitar, lute, banjo, mandolin, vocals)
  - Giles Lewin (mandolin, violin, recorder, hoboy, vocals)
  - Andrew Watts (Flemish bagpipes, shalmes, curtal, recorder, melodica, kazoo, vocals)
  - Jub Davis (double bass, vocals)
  - Rafaello Mizraki (drums, percussion, cello, Hammond organ, vocals)

== See also ==
- Red Priest
