= Giles Lewin =

British violinist and bagpiper

Giles Lewin is a British violinist and bagpiper. Currently a member of The Carnival Band, he was also a founding member of the folk band, Bellowhead.

== Biography ==
He was born in Essex in 1960 or slightly earlier. At age nine, he sang the female lead in Mozart's "Bastien et Bastienne". At Cambridge University he acquired a love of Irish traditional music. His admiration for William Lawes led him to join a group called The Medieval Players (1981–1987). In 1983 they performed Rabelais's "Gargantua" with actors, puppets and acrobats. Their version of medieval music was gutsy, compared to most early music consorts of the time. In 1987 he became a founder member of the Dufay Collective. He was also a member of the group "Afterhours" (1989–1995).

In 1989 Lewin spent several months in Cairo to study Arabic violin under Ashraf al Sarki. Lewin is a vocalist and plays fiddle, vielle, rebec, gittern, shawms, recorder, mandolin, pipe and tabor. His most remarkable skills are as a player of the Arabic violin and as a player of the single-drone medieval bagpipes. He is an occasional member of the Egyptian group Maqaam.

The Carnival Band evolved out of The Medieval Players. The combination of Giles Lewin, Andy Watts, Bill Badley and Jub dates from 1985. They have recorded as a backing band for Maddy Prior. Lewin joined up with Vivien Ellis, another member of the Dufay Collective and the Carnival Band to become the duo Alva in 1997, specialising in the music of the troubadours. The songs on "The Bells of Paradise" were first performed at the 2003 York Early Music Festival. Alva also performed at St John's, Smith Square in 2001 as part of a live performance for BBC's "Late Junction". Ellis has been a member of Sinfonye since 1989, and is a member of The Broadside Band. She is involved with jazz, singing with Keith Tippett. Marguerite Hutchison, a member of Magpie Lane, also occasionally performs with Lewin as a duo.

In 2004 Lewin became a founder member of Bellowhead and left in 2008, he was replaced by Sam Sweeney.

In 2008 he accompanied Maddy Prior at the BBC Electric Proms.

Lewin is currently based in Oxford.

=== Solo release ===
In 2008 Lewin released a solo album The Armchair Orienteer (PRKCD103), including a mix of traditional folk tunes and some original tracks. Folkworld said of the album "the most impressing thing is Giles' versability in quite a lot and quite different styles".

== Discography ==
Dufay Collective (with Giles Lewin)

- - A L'Estampida: medieval dance music (1991)
- - A Dance in the Garden of Mirth: medieval instrumental music (1994)
- - Miri It Is: songs and instrumental music from medieval England (1995)

Dufay Collective (with Giles Lewin and Vivien Ellis)

- - Johnny, Cock thy Beaver: popular music-making in 17th century England (1996)
- - On the Banks of the Seine: music of the trouveres (1997)
- - Miracles: 13th century Spanish songs in Praise of the Virgin Mary (1997)
- - Cancionero - Music for the Spanish Court 1470-1520 (2002)
- - Music for Alfonzo the Wise (2005)
- - A L'Estampida - 15¾th Anniversary Edition (2005)

Afterhours

- - Hung Up and Dry (1992)
- - Up to Here (1994)

Maddy Prior and The Carnival Band

- - Carols and Capers (1991)
- - Hang Up Sorrow And Care (1995)
- - Ringing the Changes (2007)

Alva (Giles Lewin and Vivien Ellis)

- - Love Burns in Me (2002)
- - The Bells of Paradise (2004)

Giles Lewin, David Miller, London Camerata et al.

- - Shakespeare's Musicke (1993)

Philip Pickett, New London Consort, Nigel Eaton, Giles Lewin et al.

- - Tielman Susato - Danserye 1551 (1993)

Invocation (Julia Gooding, Timothy Roberts, Giles Lewin et al.)

- - Thomas Moore's Irish Melodies (1995)

Ian Giles, John Spiers, Jon Boden, Giles Lewin

- - An English Folk Christmas (2006)

Giles Lewin

- - The Armchair Orienteer (2008)
- - Time's Chariot (2016)

Maddy Prior with Hannah James & Giles Lewin

- - Three For Joy (2012)
- - Shortwinger (2017)

== See also ==
- British violinists
