= Maddy Prior =

English folk rock singer (born 1947)

Maddy Prior MBE
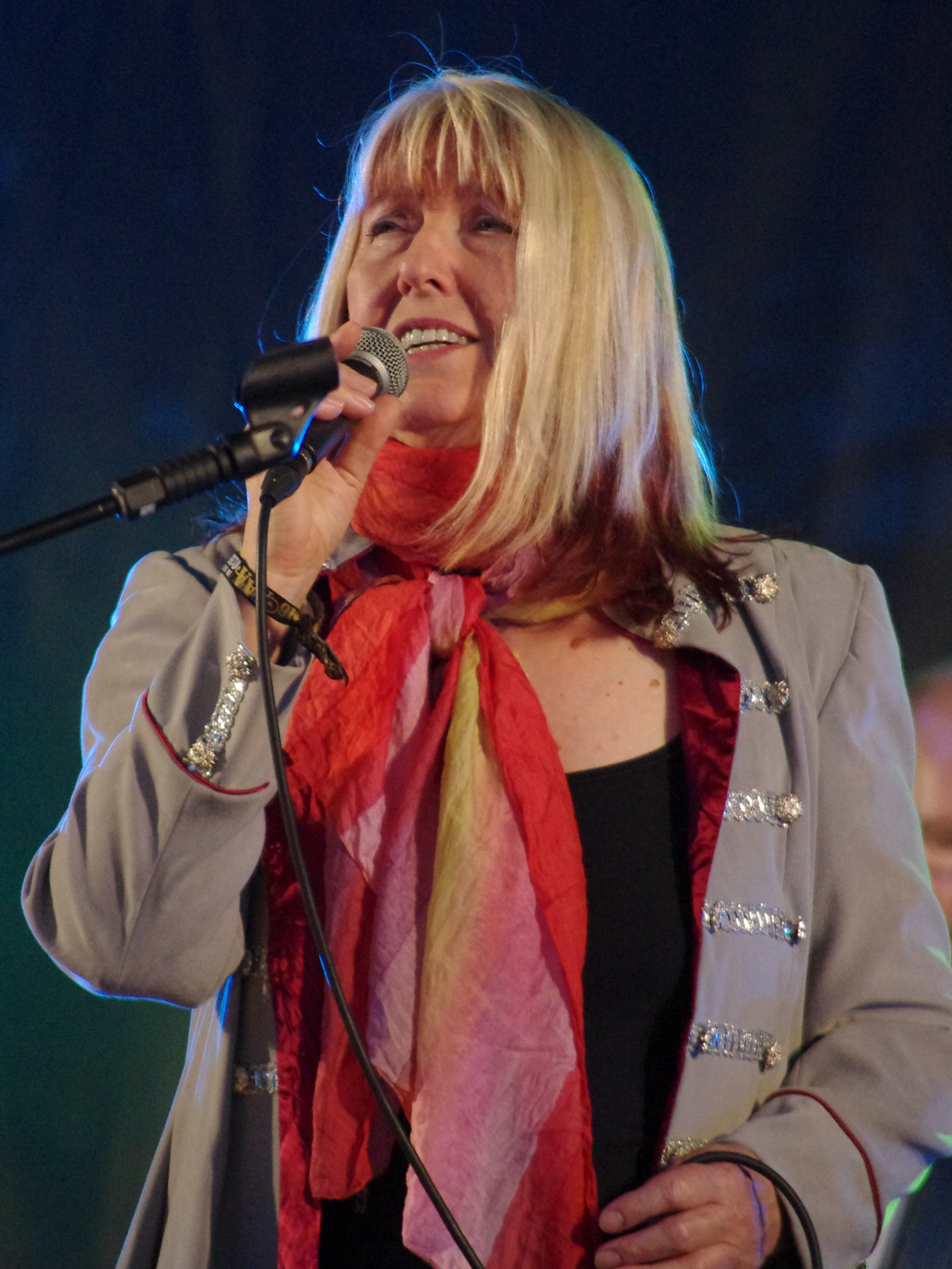
- Prior at Fairport's Cropredy Convention in 2016.

Background information
- Born: Madeleine Edith Prior; 14 August 1947 (age 79)
- Origin: Blackpool, Lancashire, England
- Genres: British folk rock; folk
- Occupations: Singer; dancer
- Instruments: Vocals; percussion; banjo
- Years active: 1967–present
- Label: Park
- Website: maddyprior.co.uk

Madeleine Edith Prior (born 14 August 1947) is an English folk rock singer, best known as the lead vocalist of Steeleye Span. She was born in Blackpool and moved to St Albans in her teens. Her father, Allan Prior, was co-creator of the police drama Z-Cars. She was married to Steeleye bass guitarist Rick Kemp, and their daughter, Rose Kemp, is also a singer. Their son, Alex Kemp, is also a guitarist and has deputised for his father playing bass guitar for Steeleye Span.

She was part of the singing duo 'Mac & Maddy', with Mac MacLeod. She then performed with Tim Hart and recorded two albums with him, before they helped to found the group Steeleye Span, in 1969. She left Steeleye Span in 1997, but returned in 2002, and has toured with them since. With June Tabor she was the singing duo Silly Sisters. She toured with the Carnival Band, in 2007, and with Giles Lewin and Hannah James, in 2012 and 2013. She has released singles and albums as a solo artist, with these bands and in several collaborations. She runs an Arts Centre called Stones Barn, in Bewcastle, in Cumbria, which offers residential courses.

== Early life ==
Born in Blackpool, Prior moved in her teens to St Albans, where she befriended the young Donovan Leitch and Mac MacLeod in The Cock pub. She later formed a duo with MacLeod called 'Mac & Maddy'. She became a roadie for visiting American musicians, including Reverend Gary Davis. They gave her useful advice about singing English folk songs instead of American songs. Her father, Allan Prior, was co-creator of the police drama Z-Cars, and wrote Stookie, a 6-part series for television, about a boy with his arm in a sling. Maddy sang the title song, which was released as a single in 1985. It reappeared on the Steeleye Span album A Rare Collection 1972 – 1996.

== Singing career ==
After a brief stint with Mac MacLeod in 'Mac & Maddy' (another act formed at The Cock pub), by 1966 she began performing with Tim Hart, another St Albans resident, and together they recorded two albums before becoming founding members of Steeleye Span in 1969. They were the backbone of the group until the early 1980s when ill-health forced Hart into semi-retirement. Prior plays the tambourine, spoons and ukulele, and always gives a sprightly performance of her individual dances. In 1974 Ralph McTell wrote "Maddy Dances" in her honour, included on his album Easy.

Prior married bassist Rick Kemp, though they have since divorced. The singer Rose Kemp is their daughter.

Prior has recorded session work, albums of her own songs and eclectic styles from medieval (with The Carnival Band), through British folk rock — Steeleye Span and Maddy Prior appeared on television with a regular BBC 4 programme Electric Folk — prog-rock and traditional songs, including session work on Mike Oldfield's Incantations. She left Steeleye Span in 1997 but returned in 2002. The 1999 album The Journey was recorded in 1995, when Maddy was still in the band, but not released until four years later. She was also one half of the duo Silly Sisters, which helped to boost June Tabor's career.

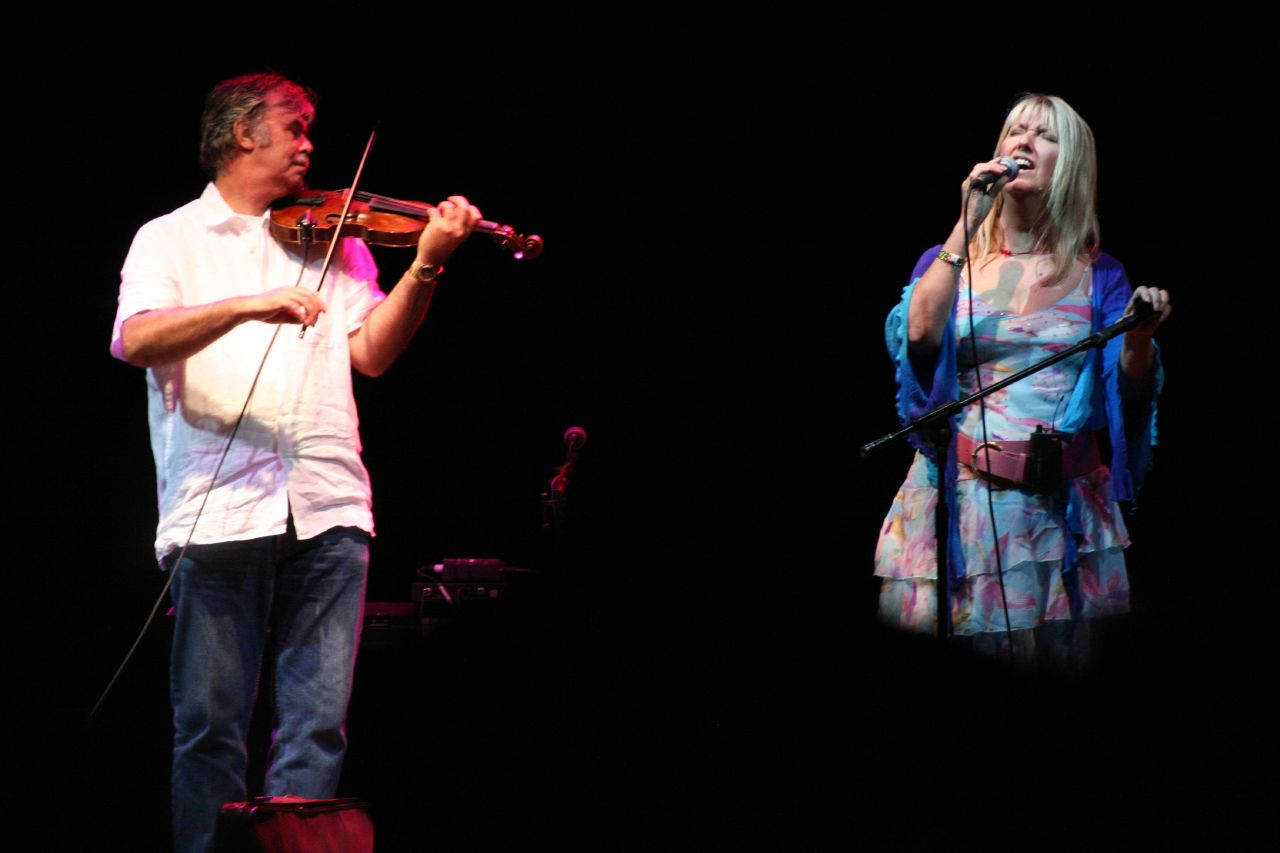
Peter Knight and Prior performing with Steeleye Span in 2006.

Since 2003 Prior has run and hosted an Arts Centre called Stones Barn in Cumbria. Working with fellow singers and performers like Abbie Lathe and daughter Rose Kemp, Prior has offered residential courses focusing on singing, meditation, cookery and performance. Other events, hosted by other teachers, include classical Indian dances, painting and drumming. Prior campaigns on behalf of the charity Cancer Research UK.

== Recent tours and albums ==
Maddy Prior took to the road with The Carnival Band in May 2007 for their "Music for Tavern and Chapel" tour. They celebrated the 300th anniversary of one of the key influences on their work, Charles Wesley. She made a guest appearance with The Levellers at the Solfest Festival in Cumbria in August 2007. On recent solo albums Troy Donockley has been a co-producer.

In December 2007 the Carnival Band album Ringing The Changes was issued. It is a collection of songs written by the band. In 2008 Maddy Prior appeared at the BBC's "Electric Proms". Steeleye Span toured the Eastern US, Australia and the UK beginning in 2009.

With Giles Lewin and Hannah James, Prior completed two successful UK tours, in the spring and autumn of 2012, with a third, in autumn 2013.

In November and December 2013 Prior toured with Steeleye Span, on the Wintersmith Tour, following the release in October of their album Wintersmith, a collaborative project based on the novel of the same name by Terry Pratchett.

A short tour with The Carnival Band in November and December, featuring carols and seasonal music, has become an annual fixture for Prior since 1984. The 2024 tour (the 40th annual tour) was the final tour.

== Awards ==
In 2001 Maddy Prior was awarded the MBE for services to folk music. In 2014 she received an Honorary Fellowship from the University of Cumbria.

== Discography ==
=== With Steeleye Span ===
Prior was on all the Steeleye Span albums from Hark! The Village Wait (1970) to Time (1996). She then returned for Present – The Very Best of Steeleye Span (2002) and subsequent albums.

=== Solo albums ===
- Woman in the Wings (1978)
- Changing Winds (1978)
- Hooked on Winning (1982)
- Going for Glory (1983)
- Happy Families (as 'Maddy Prior and Rick Kemp') (1990)
- Year (1993)
- Memento (best of) (1995)
- Flesh and Blood (1997)
- Ravenchild (1999)
- Ballads and Candles (2000)
- Arthur the King (2001)
- Bib and Tuck (2002) — as 'Maddy Prior and the Girls' with Abbie Lathe and Rose Kemp
- Lionhearts (2003)
- Under the Covers (2005) — as 'Maddy + Girls' with Abbie Lathe and Claudia Gibson
- The Quest (2007) (CD + DVD)
- Seven for Old England (2008)

=== Compilation ===
- Collections 1995 – 2005 (2005)

=== Tim Hart and Maddy Prior ===
- Folk Songs of Olde England vol 1 (1968)
- Folk Songs of Olde England vol 2 (1968)
- Summer Solstice (1971)

=== Maddy Prior and June Tabor ===
- Silly Sisters (1976)
- No More To The Dance (1988)

=== Maddy Prior, John Kirkpatrick and Sydney Carter ===
- Lovely in the Dances (1981)

=== Maddy Prior and The Carnival Band ===
- A Tapestry of Carols (1987)
- Sing Lustily and with Good Courage (1990)
- Carols and Capers (1991)
- Hang Up Sorrow and Care (1995)
- Carols at Christmas (1996)
- Gold Frankincense and Myrrh (2001)
- An Evening of Carols and Capers (2005)
- Paradise Found (2007)
- Ringing the Changes (2007)
- Vaughan Williams Carols Songs & Hymns (2010)
- A Christmas Caper: The Best of Maddy Prior & the Carnival Band (2012)

=== Maddy Prior and Martin Carthy ===
- Beat the Retreat (1994) Maddy Prior and Martin Carthy perform two songs, "Farewell, Farewell", and "The Great Valerio" on this Richard Thompson tribute album.

=== Maddy Prior, Giles Lewin and Hannah James ===
- 3 for Joy (2012)
- Shortwinger (2017)

=== Maddy Prior singles ===
- "Rollercoaster" / "I Told You So" (1978)
- "Baggy Pants" / "Woman in the Wings" (1978)
- "Just the Two of Us" / "Acappella Stella" (1979)
- "Wake up England" / "Paradise" (1980)
- "The King" / "Ringing Down the Years" (1980) (with Dave Cousins/Strawbs)
- "To Face" / "Half Listening" (1982)
- "Deep in the Darkest Night" / "Western Movies" (1983)
- "Stookie" / "Incidental Music From "Stookie"" (1985)
- "Happy Families" / "Who's Sorry Now?" (1990)
- "I Saw Three Ships" / "Quem Pastores" / "Monsieur Charpentier's Christmas Swing" (1991) (with the Carnival Band)
- "I Saw Three Ships (Dance Doctor's Christmas Re-Mix)" / "The Boar's Head" / "Poor Little Jesus" (1992)
- "All Around My Hat" (1996) (with Status Quo), No 47
- "Forgiveness" (2000) (with Jennifer Cutting All-Stars)
- "Gaudete" / "Greenwood Side" / "Gaudete (extended mix)" (2001) (with Keltic Fusion; Maddy's voice is sampled)
- "Stuff" (2007) (with the Carnival Band and Terry Jones)
- "Secret Garden" (2007) Excalibur II - The Celtic Ring, produced and composed by Alan Simon

=== DVDs ===
- Ballads and Candles (2004)
- An Evening of Carols and Capers (2005)
- Looking For a Grail Legend (2007) (documentary)

=== As a session or guest singer ===
She appeared on these albums:

- Shirley Collins: No Roses (1971)
- Martin Carthy: Shearwater (1972)
- Jack the Lad: It's Jack the Lad (1974)
- Ralph McTell: Streets... (1975), No 13
- Jethro Tull: Too Old to Rock 'n' Roll: Too Young to Die! (1976), No 25
- Wizz Jones: Magical Flight (1977)
- Mandalaband: The Eye of Wendor: Prophecies (1978) on the track Like the Wind
- Mike Oldfield: Incantations (1978), No 14
- Mike Oldfield: Exposed (1979) No 16 - live album, re-released in 2005 on DVD-Video
- Tim Hart and Friends: My Very Favourite Nursery Rhymes (1981)
- Tim Hart and Friends: The Drunken Sailor and other Kids Favourites (1983)
- Swan Arcade: Diving for Pearls (1986)
- Frankie Armstrong: Till The Grass O'Ergrew The Corn (1996)
- Status Quo: "Don't Stop" (1996), No 2
- Rev Hammer's Freeborn John: The Story of John Lilburne-The Leader of the Levellers (1997)
- Ayuo: Nova Carmina (1986) (Maddy Prior sings two songs from the Carmina Burana)
- Strawbs: Blue Angel (2003)
- Jennifer Cutting: Ocean: Songs for the Night Sea Journey (2005)
- Rev Hammer – Freeborn John Live (2007)

=== Television ===
- BBC Wildlife on One: Shadow of the Hare 12 April 1993
