= A Parcel of Steeleye Span =

A Parcel of Steeleye Span: Their First Five Chrysalis Albums 1972–1975

Box set by Steeleye Span
- Released: 2009
- Recorded: 1972–1975
- Genre: British folk rock
- Label: EMI

Steeleye Span chronology
A Parcel of Steeleye Span: Their First Five Chrysalis Albums 1972–1975 (2009)	Another Parcel of Steeleye Span: Their Second Five Chrysalis Albums 1976–1989 (2010)

A Parcel of Steeleye Span, full title A Parcel of Steeleye Span: Their First Five Chrysalis Albums 1972–1975, is a 2009 remastered box set of Steeleye Span's first five Chrysalis albums: Below the Salt, Parcel of Rogues, Now We Are Six, Commoners Crown, All Around My Hat.

It was rated 4.5 stars by AllMusic.

== Track listing ==
All tracks are "2009 Digital Remasters" unless stated otherwise.

All songs are Traditional, arr. Hart, Johnson, Kemp, Knight, Pegrum, Prior, except where noted.

Disc 1:

1. Spotted Cow 3:08
2. Rosebud in June 3:43
3. Jigs (Medley) 3:13
4. Sheepcrook and Black Dog 4:45
5. Royal Forester 4:36
6. King Henry 7:12
7. Gaudete 2:27
8. John Barleycorn 4:50
9. Saucy Sailor 5:52
10. Gaudete (Single Version) 2:27
11. The Holly and the Ivy 2:25
12. One Misty Moisty Morning 3:32
13. Alison Gross 5:30
14. The Bold Poachers 4:18
15. The Ups and Downs 2:46
16. Robbery with Violins 1:46
- Tracks 1–9 from Below the Salt
- Tracks 12–16 from Parcel of Rogues
- All songs: Traditional, arr. Hart, Johnson, Kemp, Knight, Prior

Disc 2:

1. The Wee Wee Man (Trad; Hart, Johnson, Kemp, Knight, Prior) 4:00
2. The Weaver and the Factory Maid (Trad; Hart, Johnson, Kemp, Knight, Prior) 5:23
3. Rogues in a Nation (Robert Burns) 4:35
4. Cam Ye O'er Frae France (Trad; Hart, Johnson, Kemp, Knight, Prior) 2:49
5. Hares on the Mountain (Trad; Hart, Johnson, Kemp, Knight, Prior) 4:35
6. Bonny Moorhen 4:18
7. Seven Hundred Elves 5:19
8. Drink Down The Moon 6:29
9. Now We Are Six 2:23
10. Thomas the Rhymer 6:44
11. The Mooncoin Jig 3:57
12. Edwin 4:46
13. Long-a-Growing 4:05
14. Two Magicians 4:29
15. Twinkle, Twinkle Little Star (Jane Taylor) 1:32
16. To Know Him is to Love Him (Phil Spector) 2:45
17. The Wife Of Ushers Well (Live At The Rainbow) 4:44
- Tracks 1–5 from Parcel of Rogues
- Tracks 7–16 from Now We Are Six

Disc 3:

1. Little Sir Hugh 4:45
2. Bach Goes to Limerick (Hart, Johnson, Kemp, Knight, Pegrum, Prior) 3:41
3. Long Lankin 8:42
4. Dogs and Ferrets 2:45
5. Galtee Farmer 3:47
6. Demon Lover 5:54
7. Elf Call 3:56
8. Weary Cutters 2:03
9. New York Girls 3:16
10. Black Jack Davy 4:19
11. Hard Times of Old England 5:15
12. Cadgwith Anthem 2:48
13. Sum Waves 4:04
14. The Wife of Ushers Well 4:36
15. Gamble Gold (Robin Hood) 3:44
16. All Around My Hat 4:11
17. Dance with Me 3:56
18. Batchelors Hall 5:47
- Tracks 1–9 from Commoners Crown
- Tracks 10–18 from All Around My Hat
