= Steeleye Span discography =

- Studio albums: 25
- EPs: 2
- Live albums: 14
- Compilation albums: 18
- Singles: 26
- Video albums: 8
- Box sets: 4

This is the discography of British folk rock band Steeleye Span.

== Albums ==
=== Studio ===
Title	Album details	Peak chart positions			
Title	Album details	UK	NL	SWE	US
Hark! The Village Wait	Released: June 1970; Label: RCA Victor; Formats: LP, 8-track	45	—	—	—
Please to See the King	Released: March 1971; Label: B&C; Formats: LP, MC	—	—	—	—
Ten Man Mop, or Mr. Reservoir Butler Rides Again	Released: December 1971; Label: Pegasus; Formats: LP, MC, 8-track	—	—	—	—
Below the Salt	Released: September 1972; Label: Chrysalis; Formats: LP, MC, 8-track	43	—	—	—
Parcel of Rogues	Released: April 1973; Label: Chrysalis; Formats: LP, MC, 8-track	26	—	—	—
Now We Are Six	Released: March 1974; Label: Chrysalis; Formats: LP, MC, 8-track	13	—	—	—
Commoners Crown	Released: January 1975; Label: Chrysalis; Formats: LP, MC, 8-track	21	—	—	—
All Around My Hat	Released: October 1975; Label: Chrysalis; Formats: LP, MC, 8-track	7	13	10	143
Rocket Cottage	Released: September 1976; Label: Chrysalis; Formats: LP, MC, 8-track	41	—	—	205
Storm Force Ten	Released: November 1977; Label: Chrysalis; Formats: LP, MC, 8-track	—	—	—	191
Sails of Silver	Released: November 1980; Label: Chrysalis; Formats: LP, MC	—	—	—	—
Back in Line	Released: April 1986; Label: Flutterby, Shanachie; Formats: CD, LP, MC	—	—	—	—
Tempted and Tried	Released: 18 September 1989; Label: Chrysalis, Shanachie; Formats: CD, LP, MC	—	—	—	—
Time	Released: March 1996; Label: Park, Shanachie; Formats: CD, MC	100	—	—	—
Horkstow Grange	Released: September 1998; Label: Park; Formats: CD, MC	—	—	—	—
Bedlam Born	Released: 24 September 2000; Label: Park; Formats: CD	—	—	—	—
Present – The Very Best of Steeleye Span	Released: November 2002; Label: Park; Formats: 2xCD; Album of re-recordings	—	—	—	—
They Called Her Babylon	Released: March 2004; Label: Park; Formats: CD	—	—	—	—
Winter	Released: November 2004; Label: Park; Formats: CD	—	—	—	—
Bloody Men	Released: 4 December 2006; Label: Park; Formats: 2xCD	—	—	—	—
Cogs, Wheels and Lovers	Released: 26 October 2009; Label: Park; Formats: CD	—	—	—	—
Wintersmith	Released: 28 October 2013; Label: Park; Formats: CD, digital download	77	—	—	—
Dodgy Bastards	Released: 18 November 2016; Label: Park; Formats: CD, digital download	—	—	—	—
Est'd 1969	Released: 28 June 2019; Label: Park; Formats: CD, digital download	—	—	—	—
Conflict	Released: 23 May 2025; Label: Park; Formats: CD, digital download	—	—	—	—

"—" denotes releases that did not chart or were not released in that territory.

=== Live ===
Title	Album details
Live at Last!	Released: September 1978; Label: Chrysalis; Formats: LP, MC, 8-track
On Tour	Released: 1983; Label: Chrysalis; Formats: LP
Tonight's the Night...Live	Released: September 1992; Label: Shanachie; Formats: CD, MC; Australia-only release
The Collection: Steeleye Span in Concert	Released: November 1994; Label: Park; Formats: CD
The Journey	Released: November 1999; Label: Park; Formats: 2xCD
Live in Nottingham	Released: 2002; Label: Classic Rock; Formats: CD
Folk Rock Pioneers in Concert	Released: May 2006; Label: Park; Formats: 2xCD
Live at a Distance	Released: 14 August 2009; Label: Park; Formats: 2xCD+DVD
Now We Are Six Again	Released: 3 February 2012; Label: Park; Formats: 2xCD
Live at De Montfort Hall Leicester, 1977	Released: October 2019; Label: Park; Formats: CD, LP
50th Anniversary Tour	Released: 2019; Label: Park; Formats: 2xCD+2xDVD
Hark! The Village Wait – Live	Released: 17 October 2021; Label: Park; Formats: CD
Live at the Rainbow Theatre 1974 (released as disc 11 of 12-CD box-set Good Times of Old England: Steeleye Span 1972—1983)	Released: 2022; Label: Chrysalis / Warner Music Group; Formats: CD
Live at the Berklee Performance Centre 1976 (released as disc 12 of 12-CD box-set Good Times of Old England: Steeleye Span 1972—1983)	Released: 2022; Label: Chrysalis / Warner Music Group; Formats: CD

=== Compilation ===
Title	Album details
Individually... & Collectively	Released: 1973; Label: Charisma; Formats: LP, MC
Almanack	Released: September 1973; Label: Charisma; Formats: LP, MC, 8-track
Original Masters	Released: May 1977; Label: Chrysalis; Formats: 2xLP, MC
Steeleye Span	Released: June 1980; Label: Pickwick; Formats: LP, MC
Recollections	Released: 1981; Label: Chrysalis; Formats: LP; Australia and New Zealand-only release
The Best of Steeleye Span	Released: March 1984; Label: Chrysalis; Formats: CD, LP, MC
Portfolio	Released: 3 October 1988; Label: Chrysalis, Shanachie; Formats: CD, 2xLP, 2xMC
The Early Years	Released: March 1989; Label: Connoisseur Collection; Formats: CD, 2xLP, MC
The Collection	Released: June 1991; Label: Connoisseur Collection; Formats: CD, MC
Spanning the Years	Released: February 1995; Label: Chrysalis; Formats: 2xCD
A Stack of Steeleye Span	Released: September 1996; Label: Emporio; Formats: CD, MC
The King – The Best of Steeleye Span	Released: September 1996; Label: Mooncrest; Formats: CD
A Rare Collection 1972–1996	Released: July 1998; Label: Raven; Formats: CD; Australia-only release
The Hills of Greenmore – An Anthology	Released: November 1998; Label: Recall 2 cd; Formats: 2xCD
The Best of Steeleye Span	Released: 26 August 2002; Label: EMI Gold; Formats: CD
The Lark in the Morning – The Early Years	Released: August 2003; Label: Castle Music; Formats: 2xCD
Catch Up – The Essential Steeleye Span	Released: 11 December 2015; Label: Park; Formats: 2xCD, digital download
The Green Man Collection	Released: November 30 2023; Label: Park; Formats: CD, digital download

== Box sets ==
Title	Album details
A Parcel of Steeleye Span – Their First Five Chrysalis Albums 1972–1975	Released: 12 October 2009; Label: EMI; Formats: 3xCD
Another Parcel of Steeleye Span	Released: 2 August 2010; Label: EMI; Formats: 3xCD
Original Album Series	Released: 24 November 2014; Label: Chrysalis/Warner Music Group; Formats: 5xCD
All Things Are Quite Silent – Complete Recordings 1970–71	Released: 26 November 2019; Label: Cherry Tree; Formats: 3xCD
Good Times of Old England: Steeleye Span 1972-1983	Released: 2022; Label: Chrysalis/Warner Music Group; Formats: 12xCD

== Home video ==
Title	Album details
A 20th Anniversary Celebration	Released: 1991; Label: Shanachie; Formats: VHS; US-only release
25 Live	Released: April 1995; Label: Wienerworld Presentation; Formats: VHS
Time	Released: 1996; Label: Park; Formats: VHS
Classic Rock Legends	Released: 1996; Label: Park; Formats: DVD
The 35th Anniversary World Tour 2004	Released: 11 February 2002; Label: Classic Rock Legends; Formats: DVD
Live at a Distance	Released: 14 August 2009; Label: Park; Formats: DVD (with 2xCD)
The Wintersmith Tour	Released: 28 November 2014; Label: Park; Formats: DVD; Germany-only release
50th Anniversary Tour	Released: 2019; Label: Park; Formats: 2xDVD (with 2xCD)

== EPs ==
Title	Album details
Jigs and Reels	Released: September 1972; Label: Peg
Special 4 Track E.P.	Released: November 1982; Label: Chrysalis

== Singles ==
Title	Year	Peak chart positions					Album
Title	Year	UK	AUS	BE (FLA)	IRE	NL	Album
"Rave On"	1971	—	—	—	—	—	Non-album single
"John Barleycorn"	1972	—	—	—	—	—	Below the Salt
"Gaudete"	1972	14	—	—	—	—	Below the Salt
"Thomas the Rhymer"	1974	—	—	—	—	—	Now We Are Six
"To Know Him Is to Love Him" (Australia and New Zealand-only release)	1974	—	—	—	—	—	Now We Are Six
"New York Girls"	1975	—	—	—	—	—	Commoners Crown
"All Around My Hat"	1975	5	76	20	3	11	All Around My Hat
"Hard Times of Old England"	1976	—	—	—	—	—	All Around My Hat
"London"	1976	—	—	—	—	—	Rocket Cottage
"Fighting for Strangers"	1976	54 (Note: Chart position is from the UK "Breakers List".)	—	—	—	—	Rocket Cottage
"Elf Calf" (Australia-only release)	1977	—	—	—	—	—	Original Masters
"The Boar's Head Carol"	1977	—	—	—	—	—	Non-album single
"Rag Doll"	1978	—	—	—	—	—	Live at Last!
"Montrose" (Australia-only release)	1978	—	—	—	—	—	Live at Last!
"Sails of Silver"	1980	—	—	—	—	—	Sails of Silver
"Gone to America"	1981	—	—	—	—	—	Sails of Silver
"Hunting the Wren" (Australia-only release)	1982	—	—	—	—	—	Recollections
"Somewhere in London"	1985	—	—	—	—	—	Non-album single
"Padstow"	1989	—	—	—	—	—	Tempted and Tried
"Following Me"	1989	—	—	—	—	—	Tempted and Tried
"The Fox"	1990	—	—	—	—	—	Tempted and Tried
"Lord Elgin"	2007	—	—	—	—	—	Bloody Men
"Granny Aching"	2014	—	—	—	—	—	Wintersmith
"To Be Human"	2014	—	—	—	—	—	Wintersmith
"Somewhere Along the Road"	2015	—	—	—	—	—	Catch Up – The Essential Steeleye Span
"Over the Hills and Far Away"	2025	—	—	—	—	—	Conflict
"—" denotes releases that did not chart or were not released in that territory.
