= Portfolio =

Portfolio may refer to:

== Objects ==
- Portfolio (briefcase), a type of briefcase

== Collections ==
- Portfolio (finance), a collection of assets held by an institution or a private individual
- Artist's portfolio, a sample of an artist's work or a case used to display artwork, photographs etc.
- Career portfolio, an organized presentation of an individual's education, work samples, and skills
- Electronic portfolio, a collection of electronic documents
- IT portfolio, in IT portfolio management, the portfolio of large classes of items of enterprise Information Technology
- Patent portfolio, a collection of patents owned by a single entity
- Project portfolio, in project portfolio management, the portfolio of projects in an organization
- Ministry (government department), the post and responsibilities of a head of a government department

== Computing ==
- Atari Portfolio, a palmtop computer
- Extensis Portfolio, a digital asset manager
- PDF portfolio

== Media ==
=== Music ===
- Portfolio (Grace Jones album), 1977
- Portfolio (Yolandita Monge album), 1990
- Portfolio, an album by Steeleye Span, 1988

=== Periodicals and publishing ===
- The Portfolio (1870–1893), a British fine arts magazine
- Portfolio Magazine (1979–1983), an American fine arts magazine
- Portfolio.com, website for business magazine Condé Nast Portfolio (2007–2009), standalone website after magazine ceased (2009–2016)
- Portfolio: An Intercontinental Quarterly (1945–1947), a cross-disciplinary literary journal
- Portfolio (1949), a graphic design magazine by Alexey Brodovitch
- Portfolio (1959–1964), a quarterly companion magazine to the publication ARTnews
- Portfolio (publisher), an American imprint of Penguin Group

== People ==
- Almerindo Portfolio (1878–1966), businessman and New York City Treasurer

== See also ==
- B.C.G. Analysis
- Minister without portfolio
- Port Folio (disambiguation)
- Portfolio company
- Portfolio investment
- Portfolio management (disambiguation)
