= All Around My Hat =

All Around My Hat may refer to:

- "All Around My Hat" (song)
- All Around My Hat (album), a 1975 album by Steeleye Span
