= Master of Fine Arts =

Graduate-level university degree

A Master of Fine Arts (MFA or M.F.A.) is a graduate degree in fine arts, including visual arts, creative writing, graphic design, photography, filmmaking, dance, theatre, other performing arts and in some cases, theatre management or arts administration. It is a graduate degree that typically requires two to three years of postgraduate study after a bachelor's degree, though the term of study varies by country or university. Coursework is primarily of an applied or performing nature, with the program often culminating in a thesis exhibition or performance. The first university to admit students to the degree of Master of Fine Arts was the University of Iowa in 1940.

== Requirements ==
A candidate for an MFA typically holds a bachelor's degree prior to admission, but many institutions do not require that the candidate's undergraduate major conform with their proposed path of study in the MFA program. Admissions requirements often consist of a sample portfolio of artworks or a performance audition.

== Comparison with related degrees ==
The Master of Fine Arts differs from the Master of Arts in that the MFA, while still an academic program, centers on professional artistic practice in the particular field, whereas programs leading to the MA usually center on the scholarly, academic, or critical study of the field. Additionally, in the United States, an MFA is typically recognized as a terminal degree for practitioners of visual art, design, dance, photography, theatre, film/video, new media, and creative writing—meaning that it is considered the highest degree in its field, qualifying an individual to become a professor at the university level in these disciplines.

== See also ==
- Bachelor of Fine Arts
- Doctor of Fine Arts
- National Association of Schools of Art and Design
