= Toni Arthur =

British singer and theatre director

- Born: Antoinette Alice Priscilla Wilson; 27 December 1940 (age 85); Oxford, United Kingdom
- Other name: Toni Arthur-Hay
- Occupations: Theatre director; Folk singer; Television presenter
- Television: Play School; Play Away
- Spouses: Dave Arthur (m. 1963–1993); Malcolm Hay (m. 1996–2023); (his death)

Toni Arthur-Hay (born Antoinette Alice Priscilla Wilson; 27 December 1940) is an English theatre director, former folk singer and television presenter.

== Early life and education ==
Arthur was born in Oxford, England. At the age of nine, she won a scholarship to the Royal Academy of Music, and gave a concert at the Wigmore Hall in the same year. She was educated at Mary Datchelor Girls School in Camberwell and the Royal Academy of Music.

In 1959, Toni Arthur went to University College Hospital to become a nurse, and then went on to start a degree in psychology at University College London.

== Career ==
=== Television ===
Arthur was one of the presenters of the children's programmes Play School and Play Away with Brian Cant, Jeremy Irons and Lionel Morton. She also presented Woman's Hour and TV-am's breakfast show.

=== Music ===
After releasing their first single, the traditional songs "The Cuckoo" / "A Rich and Rambling Boy", under the name The Strollers on Fontana Records (TF 598) in July 1965, Toni released several folk music albums in the late 1960s and early 1970s with her then-husband, Dave Arthur. These included Morning Stands on Tiptoe (1967), The Lark in the Morning (1969) and Hearken to the Witches Rune (1971). With her husband, she recalls travelling the world, singing in folk clubs.

Hearken to the Witches Rune was released on the red Trailer label in the UK in 1971. The tracklist is as follows: "Alison Gross", "Tam Lin", "A Fairy Tale", "The Fairy Child", "Broomfield Hill", "The Standing Stones", "The Cruel Mother", and "Alice Brand". All are traditional songs. Some copies of this album came with a 'Magic in Ballads' booklet.

It was while Arthur was performing in a folk club, she has said, that a BBC producer approached her about auditioning for a children's BBC programme called Play School. She gained the job, even though she says she was wearing "an incredibly short skirt."

Arthur also appeared on a BBC album that was a spin off from the BBC children's programme Play Away in 1977. Ready Steady Go – Play Away was full of songs in the Music Hall style. She appeared as a solo artist on tracks such as "Doctor Foster Tours The World", "Running, Stretching, Racing", "Why Does The Winkle Always Turn to the Right?" and "Night Express North Bound". She also performed many ensemble songs with Brian Cant.

=== Books ===
Arthur has written several plays and books, including All The Year Round – A Compendium of Games, Customs and Stories, which was a children's book of crafts for celebrating the seasons. This was published by Puffin Books on 27 August 1981, ISBN 0140313206.

=== Theatre ===
In 2003, Arthur directed A Very Naughty Boy by Adrian Poynton, based on the life of Graham Chapman. It won a first prize at the Edinburgh Festival Fringe.

== Personal life ==
Arthur married the singer and storyteller Dave Arthur in 1963, and they had two children Jonathan and Tim. They separated in 1977.

Her younger son Tim was formerly editor-in-chief and CEO of Time Out and is currently a radio presenter on BBC Radio London.

In 2000, Toni Arthur appeared on a programme called Mystic Challenge, and spoke about her relationship with Buddhism. "I started reading about Buddhism, and found that that philosophy of knowing yourself before you know others, suited me, and I have been a Buddhist ever since."
