= Hearken to the Witches Rune =

Studio album by Dave and Toni Arthur

Studio album by Dave and Toni Arthur
- Released: 1970 or 1971
- Recorded: 1970
- Genre: Folk music
- Length: 37:47
- Language: English
- Label: Trailer Records
- Producer: Bill Leader

Hearken to the Witches Rune is a studio album by the English folk music duo Dave and Toni Arthur, recorded in 1970 and released by Trailer Records. It features English folk music with a focus on uncanny and magical elements. Ahead of making the album, the Arthurs held discussions with the Wiccan leader Alex Sanders and were invited to Wiccan coven meetings. The title comes from Doreen Valiente's poem "The Witches' Chant". The album has not been rereleased and has developed a cult following.

== Background ==
Dave and Toni Arthur were an English husband-and-wife folk music duo who recorded albums in the late 1960s and early 1970s. They married in 1963, released their first 7" record in 1965 and their first album in 1967. Their musical approach was minimalist and they gradually came to focus on obscure songs with uncanny, magical and potentially pagan elements. They did extensive research by interviewing farmers and folklorists. When they made Hearken to the Witches Rune, they were interested in witchcraft and contacted the Wiccan leader Alex Sanders in London. They discussed magic and witchcraft with Sanders, were invited to Wiccan coven meetings and studied the ritual books of contemporary witches. They wanted to see if there were connections between contemporary occult practices and the magical content in traditional ballads. They concluded that Wicca was not based on folk tradition but came up with ways to combine the two. Dave later stressed that the interest was from an academic viewpoint and that he is non-religious. Toni is a Buddhist.

== Recording ==
Hearken to the Witches Rune was produced by Bill Leader in 1970. It was recorded in Leader's bedroom in Camden Town, London, on a Revox A77 reel-to-reel audio tape recorder.

== Music and lyrics ==
"Alison Gross" includes a bodhrán, an Irish frame drum. At the time, it was a rare song to perform. "Tam Lin" is a Scottish ballad which can be traced to the 16th century. It is about a man who wants to be free from an Elfin Queen and enlists help from a woman, Fair Margaret, leading to a power struggle that involves Tam Lin being transformed into a wolf and an adder. The version on Hearken to the Witches Rune is an amalgamation of several sources, including the lyrics collected by Francis James Child in the 19th century and a melody uncovered by Hamish Henderson. It is sung without accompaniment. "A Fairy Tale" features the Irish fiddler Kevin Burke, who performs a medley of three Irish jig and reel tunes. The instrumental music functions as illustration to a fairy tale narrated by Dave Arthur. "The Fairy Child" is based on a 19th-century poem by Samuel Lover and tells the story of a mother whose child has been abducted by fairies. It features Packie Byrne on whistle.

"Broomfield Hill" tells the story of a maiden who uses magic to protect her virginity from a knight and was a well-known folk song. The recording features Nic Jones on fiddle. "The Standing Stones" is a ballad performed in the version of John and Ethel Findlater, a couple from Orkney. The Arthurs thought the way the Findlaters interpreted it was perfect and made no changes to it. It was one of the album's most obscure song selections. "The Cruel Mother" tells the story of a young mother who kills her secret baby with a penknife and buries it, after which the dead child appears on a church porch and curses her. The song has been collected in many versions from all over Britain. "Alice Brand" is about a runaway couple in conflict with an Elfin King. Like "Broomfield Hill", it features Jones on fiddle.

== Release ==
Darksome night and shining Moon
Hell's dark mistress Heaven’s Queen
Harken to the Witches' Rune
Diana, Lilith, Melusine!

Darksome Night and shining Moon
East South West then North
Hearken to the Witches Rune
Here I come to call thee forth

— The opening of "The Witches' Chant" by Doreen Valiente, original version followed by the version on the album cover

Hearken to the Witches Rune was released by Leader's label Trailer Records. The release year is uncertain: the album sleeve says "First released 1970" but the vinyl names 1971 as the copyright year, and neither Dave, Toni nor Leader remembered when it was released when asked in 2021. The cover art features Dave and Toni Arthur in red robes against a dark background. The photograph was taken in the Leader family garden and was lit using Leader's car lights. The album title is taken from "The Witches' Chant", a poem by the Wiccan Doreen Valiente. The chant was not recorded for the album but a version of it, adapted by Sanders, is printed on the back cover. The album includes a four-page booklet titled "Magic in Ballads". Hearken to the Witches Rune has not been released in any other format. The rights were bought by Dave Bulmer of Celtic Music along with the rest of Trailer Record's catalogue in the early 1980s.

== Reception ==
Roy Palmer reviewed Hearken to the Witches Rune in the journal English Dance & Song in 1971. Palmer wrote: "There are many good things here, of which the title, the most pretentious I have seen for a long time, is not one." He described the Arthurs' singing style as "clear, clean and musical" and complimented how they vary between solo and duo and between harmonies and unison singing. He said the accompaniments are varied but the tone and mood lack in variation. Overall, he said the album is "very worthwhile", although "Tam Lin" uses "illegitimate dynamic variations" and "The Fairy Child" suffers from overuse of slides.

Colin Larkin's Encyclopedia of Popular Music (2006) says Hearken to the Witches Rune is the most notable of Dave and Toni Arthur's albums, and that their interest in paganism and witchcraft gets a "sinister edge" from Toni's vocal range. Writing in 2011, the music journalist Rob Young called the album "one of English folk's great lost recordings", due to its unavailability. He contrasted the sunny mood of the artists' 1967 debut album with the nocturnal aesthetics of Hearken to the Witches Rune, describing the latter album's raw interpretations of supernatural ballads as imaginary versions of what they would be like as parts of magic rituals. He paralleled Wicca's "patchwork invention" and untrustworthy claims of authenticity with folk music, writing that their elements of transmission and adaptation do not make them invalid as modern religion and music. In 2015, the magazine Uncut selected Hearken to the Witches Rune as one of the "greatest lost albums", writing that the album's ballads appear "as though performed skyclad in a forest clearing", and called "The Cruel Mother" the "most chilling version ever recorded".

Hearken to the Witches Rune developed a cult following among listeners interested in folklore and occultism. Its unavailability in other formats than vinyl has contributed to its lore. According to the religious studies scholar Christopher Partridge, it is significant that "The Witches' Chant" and the phrase "hearken to the witches rune" appear on the cover but not on any album track. Partridge says this communicates that the album is meant as something beyond entertainment and turns it into a "sacred artifact".

== Track listing ==
Side one
No.	Title	Length
1.	"Alison Gross"	2:44
2.	"Tam Lin"	4:22
3.	"A Fairy Tale"	7:14
4.	"The Fairy Child"	4:26

Side two
No.	Title	Length
1.	"Broomfield Hill"	4:07
2.	"The Standing Stones"	3:52
3.	"The Cruel Mother"	6:38
4.	"Alice Brand"	4:24
Total length:		37:47

== See also ==
- Alexandrian Wicca
- Neopagan music
