= Down by the Greenwood Side (opera) =

- dramatic pastoral by Harrison Birtwistle
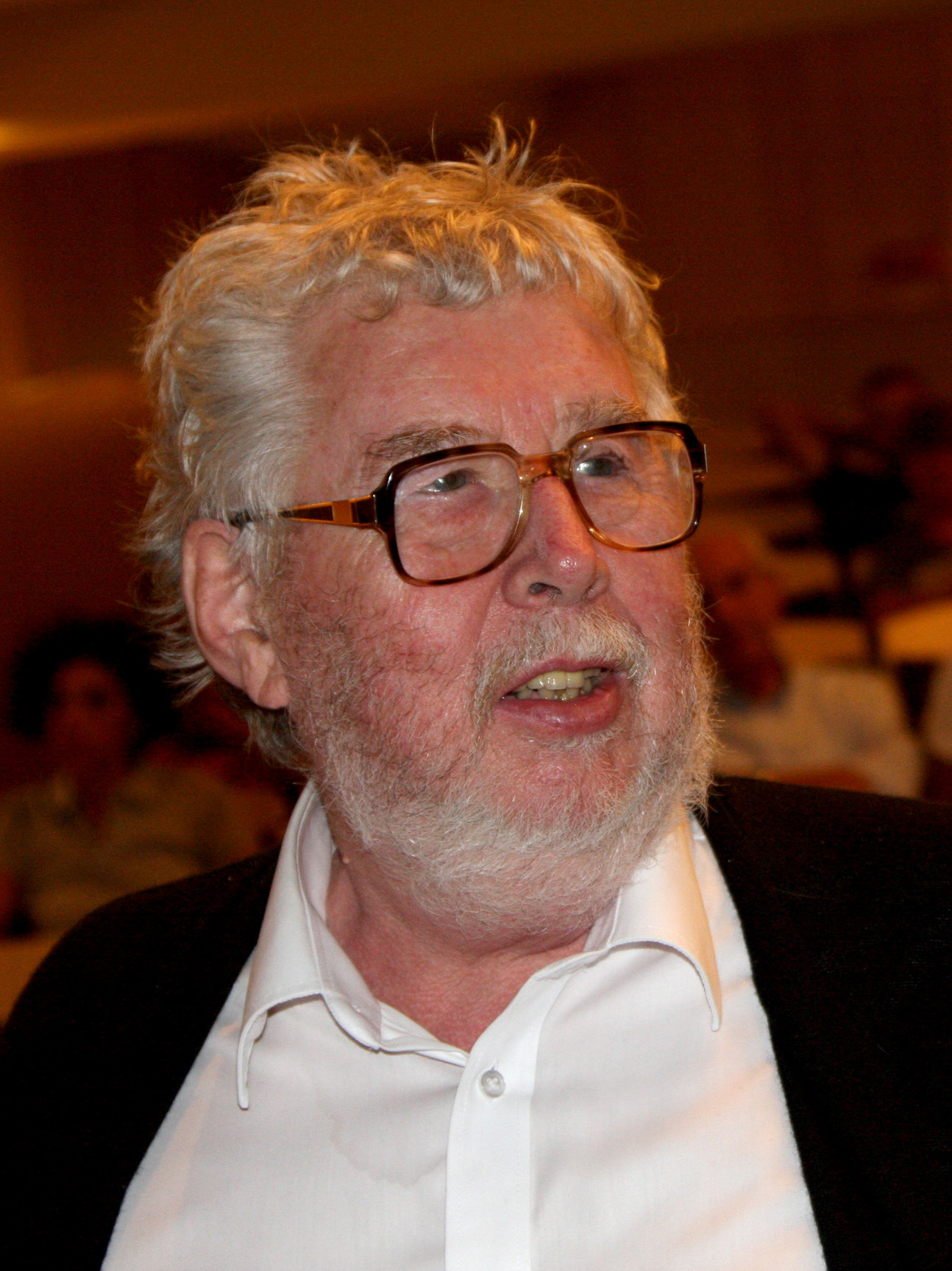
- The composer in 2008
- Librettist: Michael Nyman
- Language: English
- Based on: "The Cruel Mother"
- Premiere: 8 May 1969; Festival Pavilion, Brighton

Down by the Greenwood Side is a "dramatic pastoral" composed by Harrison Birtwistle to a text by Michael Nyman. It was first performed on 8 May 1969 at the Festival Pavilion, West Pier, Brighton. The New York Philharmonic staged the opera as part of their New Horizons music festival in 1984 with conductor Larry Newland leading singers Susan Belling, Bruce Vernon Bradley, Richard Levine, John Lankston and James Billings.

The text comes from two sources: a popular ballad called "The Cruel Mother", and passages from various mummers plays, the folk plays of the English countryside. The soprano, Mrs. Green, sings the ballad while the actors and mime perform the play. The two ingredients never meet; both are completely self-contained, involved only in themselves. But near the end, in the final tableau, there is a slight acknowledgement of each other's worlds when the presenter of the mummers' play, Father Christmas, completes the story Mrs. Green has been telling, and Mrs. Green momentarily enters the mummers’ acting area.
