= Electronic portfolio =

Collection of electronic evidence assembled and managed by a user

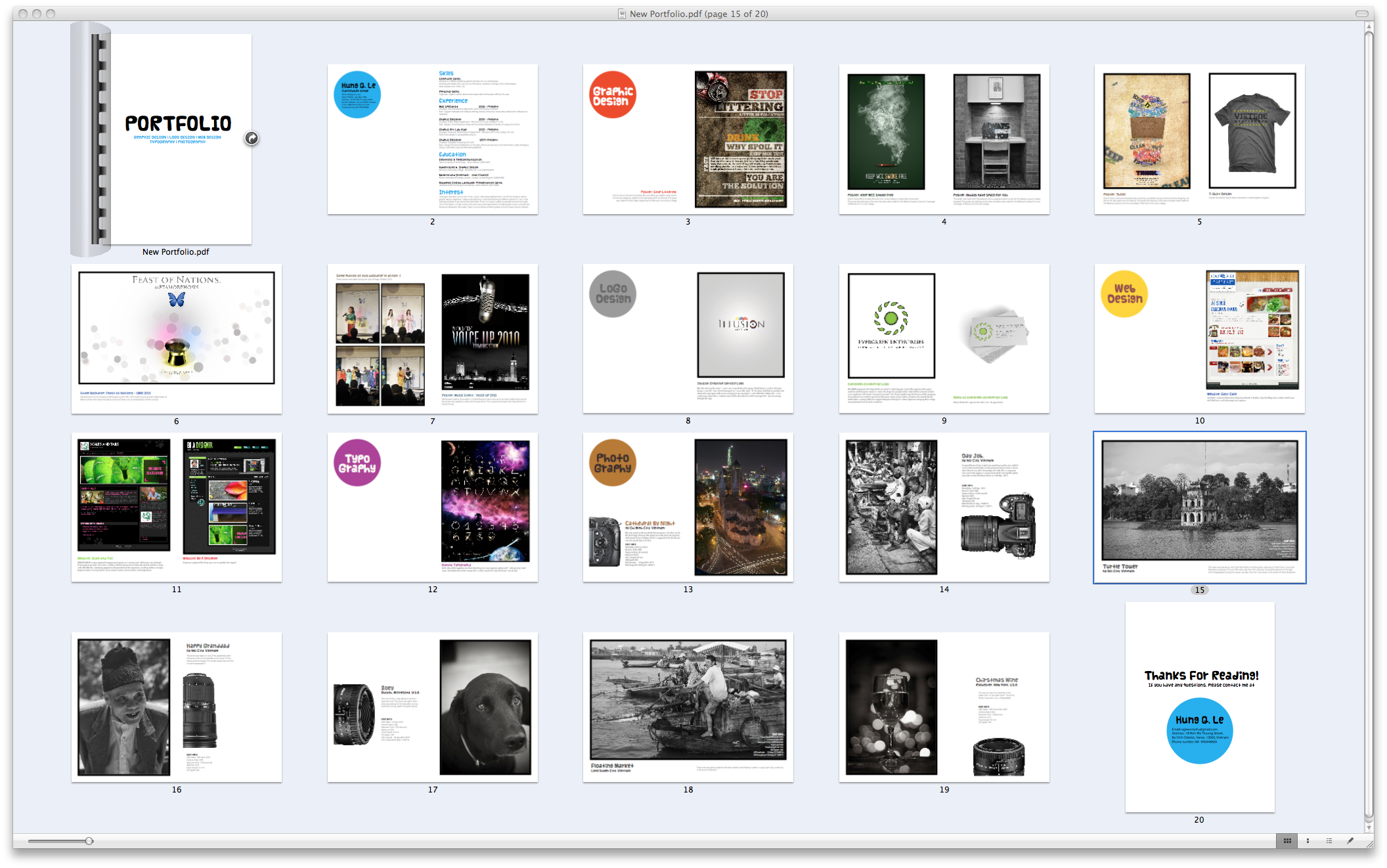
Electronic portfolio (PDF portfolio)

In education, an electronic portfolio (also known as a digital portfolio, online portfolio, e-portfolio, e-folio, or eFolio) is a collection of electronic evidence assembled and managed by a computer user, usually but not exclusively on the World Wide Web.

Such electronic evidence may include input text, electronic files, images, multimedia, blog entries, and hyperlinks. E-portfolios are both demonstrations of the user's abilities and platforms for self-expression. If they are online, users can maintain them dynamically over time.

One can regard an e-portfolio as a type of learning record that provides evidence of achievement. A learning record is closely related to the student's learning plan, a tool that an individual, team, community of interest, organization, et cetera use to manage learning. To the extent that a personalized learning environment captures and displays a learning record, it may also operate as an electronic portfolio.

An e-portfolio, like a traditional career portfolio, can facilitate a student's reflection on the student's own learning, leading to more awareness of learning strategies and needs.

== Types ==
There are three main types of e-portfolios, although they may be referred to using different terms:

- developmental (e.g., working)
- assessment
- showcase

A developmental e-portfolio can show the advancement of skill over a period of time rubrics. The main purpose is to provide an avenue for communication between student and instructor. An assessment portfolio will demonstrate skill and competence in a particular domain or area. A showcase portfolio highlights stellar work in a specific area, it is typically shown to potential employers to gain employment. When it is used for job application it is sometimes called career portfolio. Most e-portfolios are a mix of the three main types to create a hybrid portfolio.

== Usage ==
Electronic portfolios have been used in:

- Schools (see also Technology integration)
- Higher education
- Continuing professional development
- Job applications and professional advertisements
- Therapy groups
- Assessment
- Accreditation
- Recognition of prior learning (RPL)

=== In education ===
In education, the electronic portfolio is a collection of a student's work that can advance learning by providing a way for them to organize, archive, and display work. The electronic format allows a professor to evaluate student portfolios as an alternative to paper-based portfolios because they provide the opportunity to review, communicate, and give feedback in an asynchronous manner. In addition, students are able to reflect on their work, which makes the experience of creating the e-portfolio meaningful. A student e-portfolio may be shared with a prospective employer or used to record the achievement of program or course specific learning outcomes.

The uses of e-portfolios are most common in the courses with departments of education. Most preservice teachers are asked to compile an e-portfolio to demonstrate competencies needed to gain teaching certification or licensure. Student e-portfolios have been used in other disciplines such as communications, math, business, nursing, engineering and architecture. In education e-portfolios have six major functions:

- Document skills and learning;
- Record and track development within a program;
- Plan educational programs;
- Evaluate and monitor performance;
- Evaluate a course;
- Find a job

A teaching e-portfolio is used to showcase career accomplishments. Different sorts of files can be added here which the marking and other work is easier for the student as well as tutor.

E-portfolios also help to foster an independent and autonomous way of thinking, according to Strivens. This is in large part because people must focus on their collective work, think about how it will be portrayed, and what the work says about them as an individual. The individual is then in charge of their learning and the choice of where to demonstrate their proficiency. People are also forced to reflect on what they have learned and how they plan to build and improve in the future. This helps people to become better critical thinkers and helps them to develop their writing and multimedia skills. Today, many students are using multimedia such as Facebook, X (Twitter), and texting—all informal settings. The electronic portfolio, on the other hand, is a more formal setting where students must apply both their knowledge of how the web works and the message they want to convey. In this sense, students' use and comfort with the web at times can be a hindrance if they are not taught to use electronic portfolios in the correct fashion, suggests Lane. Many universities and schools are currently working to make sure that students are gaining practice and experience with electronic portfolios so that they are able to use them to the best of their ability. For example, in places like Michigan students can earn the MCOATT (Michigan Certificate of Outstanding Achievement in Teaching Technology) for submitting an electronic portfolio which demonstrates evidence of technology being used in the classroom. This consortium is an organization aimed to make Michigan one of the leaders in integrating technology into the training of young professionals.

Beyond institutional settings, general-purpose drag-and-drop website building platforms like Behance, Wix, Webflow, Figma, Format, and portfoliobox have become widely adopted tools for creating e-portfolios.

In professional and creative fields, e-portfolios are used to present work, services, or projects to employers, clients, or collaborators. These portfolios typically combine multimedia and text to showcase skills, experience, and completed work in a format that can be updated over time. Research on e-portfolios suggests their value in supporting professional identity, reflection, and communication with diverse audiences. Unlike simple digital files, e-portfolios allow users to contextualize their work by explaining its significance within their professional development. Platforms such as Dribbble, Mobbin, and Awwwards are commonly used by creative professionals to display portfolios and increase visibility of their work.

== See also ==
- Career portfolio – Personal record of work achievements
- Artist's portfolio – Collection of the best works by the artist
- Inter/National Coalition for Electronic Portfolio Research (INCEPR) – Non-profit organization
