= The Brown Girl =

Traditional song

The Brown Girl (Roud 180, Child 295) is an English-language folk song. The folk song originates from the Appalachian region however some versions have been documented in other places on the East Coast of the United States such as South Carolina.

== Synopsis ==
The Folk Song has many variations, some names of the folk tune include "Pretty Sally", "Sweet Sally", "Queen Sally", "The Brown Girl", "A Sailor From Dover", "The Rich Irish Lady", "Sally and Billy", "The Bold Sailor", and "The Fair Damsel From London"

The Brown Girl

The brown-skinned girl received a letter from her lover, telling her that he was rejecting her for a more beautiful woman. Then she received another, saying he was dying and summoning her. She told him she was delighted at his dying.

The Rich Irish Lady/Pretty Sally

This version follows a rich young woman, usually called Sally, who has fallen ill with a disease and her doctor, a poor man, sometimes referred to as Billy, has fallen in love with her. The woman rejects him however when she becomes sick again, the doctor refuses to assist and she dies, however her final wish is to gain forgiveness from the doctor whom she rejected years ago. She give him three gold rings and tells him to wear them while he dances on her grave.

== Recordings ==
- Frankie Armstrong, Lovely on the Water (1972)
- Steeleye Span, Rocket Cottage (1976)
- Martin Carthy and Dave Swarbick, Skin and Bone (1992)
- John Langstaff, At The Foot of Yonders Mountain (2002)
- Angeline Morrison, The Brown Girl and Other Folk Songs (2022)

== See also ==
- List of the Child Ballads
