= Port Folio =

Port Folio may refer to:

- The Port Folio, a 19th-century American literary magazine
- Port Folio Weekly, an American online newspaper established 1983

== See also ==
- Portfolio (disambiguation)
