= The Spotted Cow =

Traditional English folk song

Song
- Genre: English folk
- Songwriter: Traditional

"Spotted Cow" (Roud 956) is a traditional English folk song.

The following was written by A. L. Lloyd on the album sleeve notes of Peter Bellamy's The Fox Jumps Over the Parson's Gate:

This innocent idyllic tone and the bits of literary phrase—“cot”, “swain” and such—suggest that this song wasn't made by a country labourer but by an educated amateur writing “in the folk manner”. And so on examination it proves to be. It was written for the London pleasure gardens, appearing on a Vauxhall Gardens song-sheet in the 1740s and again at Ranelagh Gardens in the 1760s (with the locale fashionably moved to Scotland so that it concerns a swain named Jamie on the banks of the Tweed). It reappeared as a Regency parlour ballad in Fairburne's . It dropped out of fashionable use by the mid-nineteenth century, but country-folk retained their affection for it right up to the present, and it has turned up in Devon and Somerset, in Oxfordshire and Yorkshire, and of course in Norfolk, where Peter Bellamy found it in the repertoire of Harry Cox.

== Field recordings ==
- Edgar Hylton of Brigg, Lincolnshire, was recorded singing the song by Percy Grainger in 1906, and the recording is available online.
- Norfolk farmworker Harry Cox sang the song to Peter Kennedy in 1953, and on film in 1962. Harry Cox's version is the version on which the popular recordings are based.
- Frank Hinchliffe of Sheffield, South Yorkshire, sang The Spotted Cow 1976 to Mike Yates and Ruairidh and Alvina Greig. This recording was included a year later on his Topic album of traditional songs from South Yorkshire.

== Other recordings ==
- Peter Bellamy sang The Spotted Cow on his third solo LP, The Fox Jumps Over the Parson's Gate, accompanying himself on Anglo concertina.
- Steeleye Span recorded it in 1972 for their third album, Below the Salt, in what is by far the most popular rendition.
