= Inter/National Coalition for Electronic Portfolio Research =

Non-profit organization

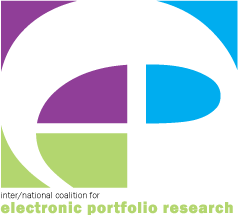

The Inter/National Coalition for Electronic Portfolio Research (INCEPR) is a non-profit organization, based in the United States but with international partners and operations, dedicated to conducting research on the impact of eportfolios on student learning and educational outcomes.

== Shape of the coalition ==
=== Overview ===
The INCEPR conducts eportfolio research through a series of staggered and overlapping cohorts serving three-year terms. Each cohort is formed, through an application process, by select faculty, staff, and administrators from approximately ten colleges or universities either in the US or abroad. Each cohort has its own research agenda, and each member institution proposes an appropriate study, provides updates on their progress, and reports findings to the other members of the cohort throughout the term. There have been six Cohorts thus far.

=== Focused agendas ===
Four of the six INCEPR cohorts have had research agendas that were focused in a particular area. Cohort I and Cohort II focused on reflection in eportfolios, Cohort III focused on integrative learning and student/academic affairs, Cohort IV focused on the relationship between personal development plans and eportfolios, and Cohort VI focused on assessment.

Steven J. Corbett, a member of Cohort I with the University of Washington, reported on his team's findings for Inside Higher Ed:

In short, our findings suggest: most students take to writing with technology quite well, and those who do not usually benefit from the practice and explicit instruction; instructors and administrators sometimes need just as much help learning about technological choices and options (let alone teaching them) as students; and online writing environments do not magically produce better student writing — or better teaching practices — but can allow for practice with different composing and teaching skills, which can lead to better writing, teaching, and administering depending on the form (for example awareness of audio, visual, and design considerations).

=== Partners ===
The coalition works with partner organizations, including the Center for Recording Achievement and the Higher Education Academy in the UK. The third cohort was sponsored by NASPA: Student Affairs Administrators in Higher Education.

The coalition is listed among the "Relevant Organizations" to electronic portfolio research by the National Council of Teachers of English.

== History ==
The INCEPR was founded in 2003 by Barbara Cambridge and Kathleen Blake Yancey. Since 2009 Barbara Cambridge, Darren Cambridge, and Kathi Yancey have been co-directors of the coalition.

=== Cohorts ===
The following is a list of cohorts, their years of operation, and their member institutions.

==== Cohort I (2003-2006) ====
- Alverno College
- Bowling Green State University
- Indiana University-Purdue University Indianapolis (IUPUI)
- LaGuardia Community College
- Northern Illinois University
- Portland State University
- Stanford University
- University of Washington
- Virginia Tech

==== Cohort II (2004-2009) ====
- Clemson University
- Kapiʻolani Community College
- George Mason University
- Thomas College
- Ohio State University
- University of Georgia
- University of Illinois
- University of Nebraska Omaha
- Washington State University

==== Cohort III (2006-2009) ====
- Arizona State University Polytechnic
- California State University System
- Florida State University
- Framingham State University
- George Mason University
- Minnesota State Colleges and Universities
- Penn State University
- Seton Hall University
- Sheffield Hallam University
- University of San Diego
- University of Waterloo
- University of Wolverhampton

==== Cohort IV (2007-2010) ====
- University of Bradford
- University of Cumbria
- University of Groningen
- London Metropolitan University
- University of Manchester Medical School
- University of Michigan
- University of Northumbria
- University of Nottingham
- Queen Margaret University College
- University of Wolverhampton

==== Cohort V (2008-2011) ====
- Kapiʻolani Community College
- University of Akron
- University of Cincinnati
- University of Denver
- University of Oregon
- Virginia State University
- Virginia Tech

==== Cohort VI (2010-2013) ====
- Bowling Green State University
- Curtin University of Technology (Australia)
- Goshen College
- Indiana University Purdue University Indianapolis
- Lamar University
- Northeastern University
- Portland State University
- University of Georgia
- University of Michigan
- University of Mississippi
- Virginia Military Institute
- Westminster College
