= Our Goodman =

Song

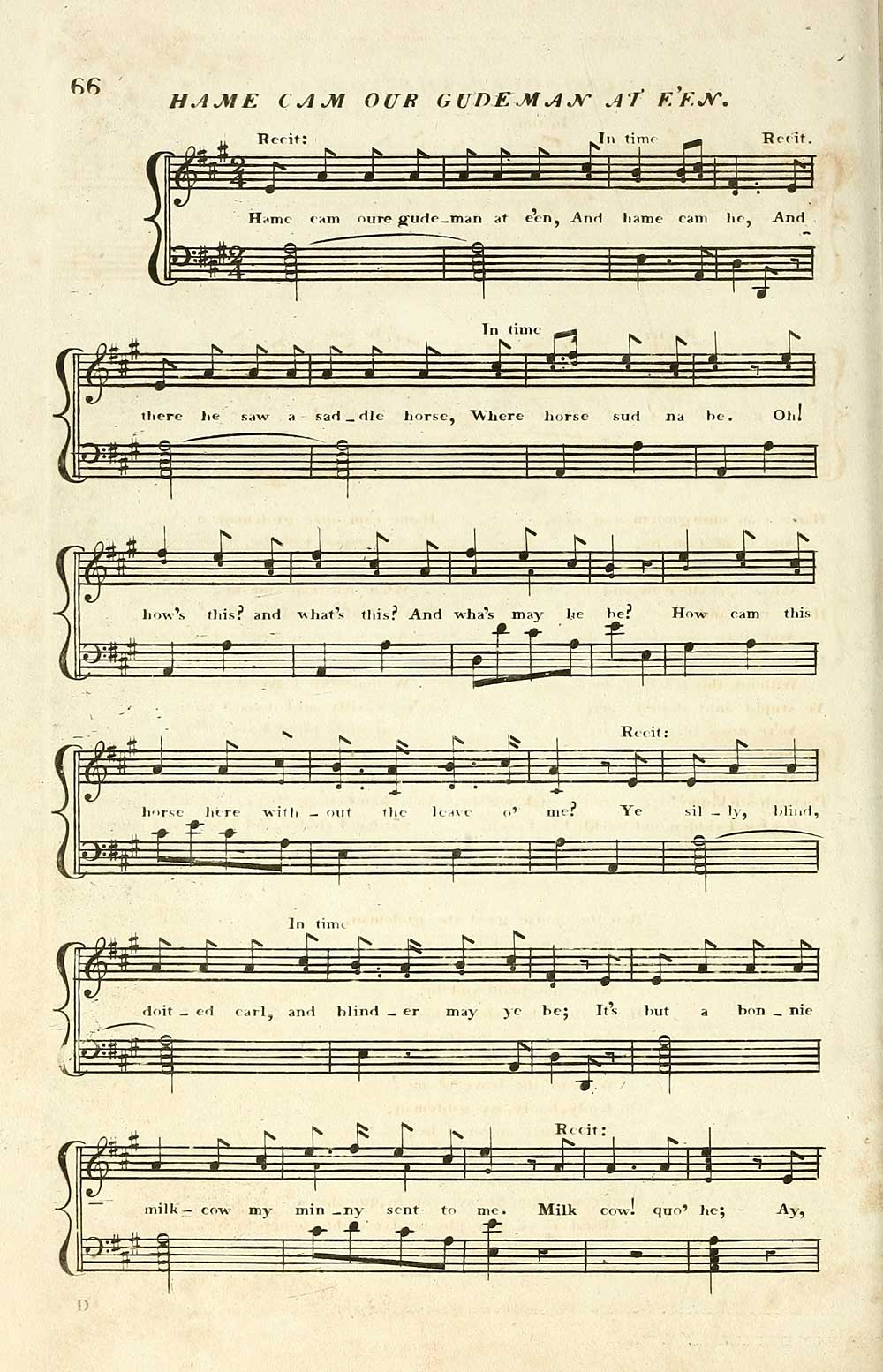
- "Hame Cam Our Gudeman at E'en", from The Scotish Minstrel (1823)

Song
- Published: 18th century (earliest known)
- Genre: Broadside ballad, folksong
- Songwriter: Unknown

"Our Goodman" (Child 274, Roud 114) is a Scottish and English humorous folk song. It describes the efforts of an unfaithful wife to explain away the evidence of her infidelity. A version of the song, "Seven Drunken Nights", was a hit record for The Dubliners in the 1960s.

== History and content ==
The song appeared in David Herd's 1776 compilation Ancient and Modern Scottish Songs. In it a husband (goodman) comes home to find a strange horse there. When he asks his wife what the horse is doing there she calls him stupid and blind, and says that it is a milk cow her mother sent her. The man retorts that in all his travels he never saw a saddle on a cow.

Our goodman came hame at e'en,
And hame came he:
And there he saw a saddle horse,
Where nae horse should be.

O how came this horse here?
How can this be
How came this horse here,
Without the leave o' me?

A horse! quo' she:
Ay, a horse, quo' he.
Ye auld blind dotard carl,
Blind mat ye be
'Tis naething but a bonny milk cow,
My minny sent to me.

A bonny milk cow! quo' he;
Ay, a milk cow, quo' she.
Far hae I ridden,
And meikle hae I seen,
But a saddle on a cow's back
Saw I never nane.

On subsequent evenings he comes home to find other strange items, such as boots, a sword and a coat, for which his wife gives him equally far-fetched explanations. Finally, he goes to bed, where he finds a "sturdy man", who his wife tells him is a new milkmaid her mother sent her, to which he replies that "long-bearded maidens I saw never nane."

Another version appeared in R. A. Smith's 1823 collection, The Scotish Minstrel, as "Hame Cam Our Gudeman at E'en" ("Home came the husband at evening"). The early verses of this are much the same as in the Herd version, but in the final verse the husband finds a highland plaid, which reveals the stranger to be a refugee from the Jacobite Wars:

Blind as ye may jibe me, I've sight enough to see,
Ye're hidin tories in the house
Without the leave o' me.

Francis James Child, in The English And Scottish Popular Ballads (1882), noted the version published by Herd (which he called A), and a different version (B) called "The Merry Cuckold and the Kind Wife", which was published as a broadside in London. In this version the cuckold, named as "Old Wichet", comes home to find, not one, but three horses, swords, boots etc.:

O I went into the stable,
and there for to see,
And there I saw three horses stand,
by one, by two, and by three.

O I calld to my loving wife,
and 'Anon, kind sir!' quoth she:
'O what do these three horses here,
without the leave of me?'

Child's B version was translated into German by Friedrich Ludwig Wilhelm Meyer in 1789, and later spread to Scandinavia and Hungary. Child gives the first lines as:

Ich ging in meinem Stall, da sah Ich, ei! ei!
An Krippen standen Pferde, eins, zwei, drei.
(I went to my stable, there I saw, ay! ay!
At cribs were standing horses, one, two, three.)

Another, quite different version, called "Marion", was popular in France and Italy.

The Roud Folk Song Index has over 400 versions of the song, with titles such as "Merry Cuckold", "Old Witchet", "Three Nights Drunk" and "Seven Nights Drunk". Steve Roud and Julia Bishop described it as "an immensely widespread song, probably known all over the English-speaking world, with the wording varying considerably but the structure and basic story remaining the same." Bertrand Harris Bronson listed 58 versions for which tunes exist; he found considerable variety in the tunes, which he divided into eight groups. John E. Housman observed that "There is much of Chaucer's indomitable gaiety in this ballad. The questions of the jealous husband and the evasions of his wife are treated here in a humorous vein".

A version of the song called "Seven Drunken Nights" was a hit single for Irish folk group The Dubliners in 1967, reaching No. 7 on the UK Singles Chart.

A Danish version of the song featured in the historical drama series 1864, where it was sung by soldiers before a battle. It followed Child's B version ("Three Guards' horses stood in a row / And one and two and three").

A Russian version, called "The Drunk Cowboy", was recorded in 2003 by Alexander Tkachev. It consists of five parts, at the end of each the wife tells the cowboy to go to sleep. The days include a horse (cow, saddled) a hat (chamberpot, from straw), pants (rags, with a zipper), a stranger's head (cabbage with a moustache), and, finally, a baby which doesn't look like the cowboy's (a log, but one which pees).

== Recordings ==
Album/Single	Performer	Year	Variant	Notes
Earl Johnson Vol. 1 1927	Earl Johnson	1927	Three Nights Experience	Document DOCD-8005
Anthology of American Folk Music Vol 1. Ballads	Coley Jones	1929	Drunkards Special	Wife's logic fails to explain strange bedfellow to drunkard
Complete Recordings	Blind Lemon Jefferson	1929	Cat Man Blues	JSP Record JSP7706. Contains one verse and chorus
Serenade The Mountains: Early Old Time Music On Record	Gid Tanner & Riley Puckett	1934	Three Nights Drunk	JSP Records JSP7780
Deep River of Song: Black Texicans	Percy Ridge	1943	Western Cowboy	Rounder CD 1821
Blind Boy Fuller Remastered 1935–1938	Blind Boy Fuller	1936	Cat Man Blues	JSP Records JSP7735. Contains one verse and chorus
Cajun Rare & Authentic, Disc D, 1935 – 1939	Jolly Boys of Lafayette	1937	Old Man Crip (Nights 1 & 5)	JSP Records JSP77115D
1947–1948	Tom Archia	1948	Cabbage Head Part 1 and Cabbage Head Part 2	
The Folk Songs of Britain, Child Ballads Vol 2	Harry Cox, Mary Connors, Colm Keane	1953; 1952; 1951	Our Goodman	Caedmon TC 1146 / Topic 12T 161; Track composed of three fragments from different field recordings Colm Keane's version is in Irish Gaelic
78 record	Douglas Kennedy	1954	Hame Cam Oor Guidman at 'Een	HMV B 10836
Blood, Booze 'N' Bones	Ed McCurdy	1956	Four Nights Drunk	Elektra – EKL-108
Down and Out Blues	Sonny Boy Williamson	1959	Wake Up Baby	Checker LP-1437
Morrissey and the Russian Sailor and Other Irish Songs (EP)	Joe Heaney	1960	The Good Man	Collector Records (UK) JEI 5
Traditional Music of Beech Mountain 1	Hattie Presnell	1961	Five Nights Drunk	Folk-Legacy FSA 22
The English and Scottish Popular Ballads: Vol. 1 – Child Ballads	Ewan MacColl	1961	Oud Goodman (Our Gudeman, Child 274)	Folkways Records FG 3509
Sing Out!	The Limeliters	1962	Pretty Far Out	Modernized American version, Cadillac is a freezer with fins
Folk Balladeer	John Jacob Niles	1965	Our Goodman or Old Cuckold	Compilation LP later reissued as My Precarious Life in the Public Domain.
Single	The Dubliners	1967	Seven Drunken Nights	Major Minor MM506.
Jack Elliott of Birtley, The songs and stories of a Durham miner	Jack Elliott	1969	The Blind Fool	Recorded in a club. Jack is persuaded by the audience to sing the final verse.
Ten Man Mop, or Mr. Reservoir Butler Rides Again	Steeleye Span	1971	Four Nights Drunk	Pegasus PEG 9
House Party New Orleans Style	Professor Longhair	1971	Cabbage Head	Composer: Henry Roeland Byrd/Mac Rebennack
The Voice of the People Vol 13	George Spicer	1972	Coming Home Late	
Digital Library of Appalachia	Jenes Cottrell	1973	Four Nights Drunk	Recorded at the Mountain Heritage Festival in Carter County, Kentucky.
Mrs 'Ardin's Kid	Mike Harding	1975	The Drunken Tackler	Updated with a Lancashire theme
Daft Ditties	Alex Beaton	1987	Seven Drunken Nights	
Goin' Back to New Orleans	Dr. John	1992	Cabbage Head	
Irish Beer Drinking Favorites	The Kilkenny Brothers	1998	Seven Drunken Nights	.
Digital Library of Appalachia	Sheila K. Adams	1998	Four Nights Drunk	Recorded at the Berea College Celebration of Traditional Music 10-22-98.
Murder, Misery and Then Goodnight	Kristin Hersh	1998	Three Nights Drunk	
Going Up the Missouri: Songs & Dance Tunes from Old Fort Osage	Jim Krause	1999	Cabbagehead	.
The Dickel Brothers Vol 1.	Dickel Brothers	1999	Three Nights Experience	EMPTY 376
Debasement Tapes	Tom Smith	1999	Seven Drunken Nights In Space	Science Fiction filk version
Морщина времени	Alexander Tkachev	2003	Пьяный ковбой (The Drunk Cowboy)	Russian version
Underneath The Stars	Kate Rusby	2003	The Goodman	.
The Continuing Tradition, Vol 1: Ballads, A Folk-Legacy Sampler	Max Hunter	2004	Five Nights Drunk	Folk-Legacy CD75 –
The Birds Upon the Tree and other traditional songs and tunes	Alice Francombe	2004	The Old Drunken Man	Musical Traditions Records MTCD333
