= Cam Ye o'er frae France =

Scots Jacobite folk song

"Cam Ye O'er Frae France?"
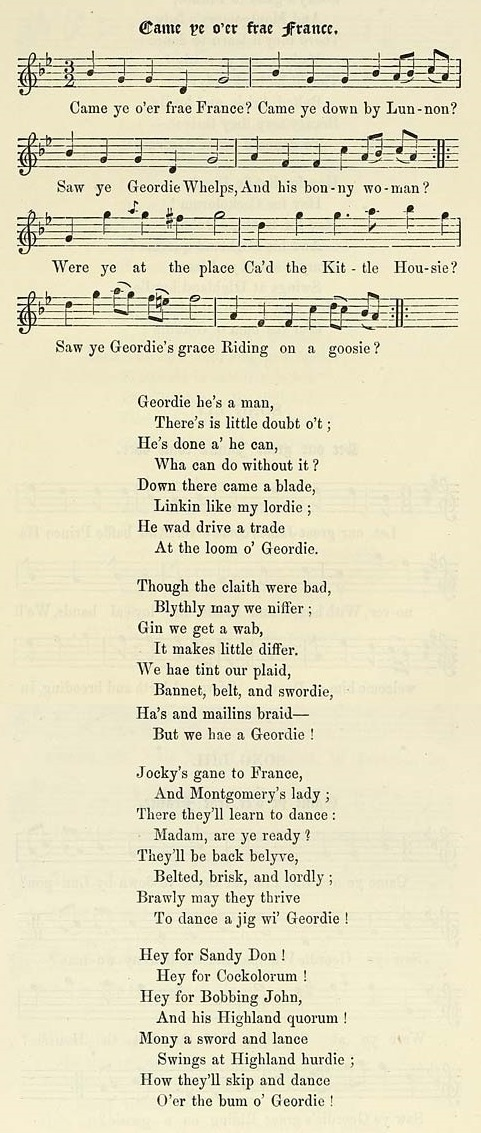

Song
- Language: Scots
- English title: Came You Over From France?
- Written: 18th century
- Songwriter: Traditional

Cam Ye o'er frae France? (Roud 5814) is a Scots folk song from the time of the Jacobite rebellions of the 18th century. It satirises the marital problems of the Hanoverian George I.

== Background ==
After the death of Queen Anne the British crown passed on to George, the Elector of Hanover. In his entourage George I brought with him a number of German courtiers, including his mistress Melusine von der Schulenburg, whom he later created the Duchess of Kendal (known as the Goose) and his half-sister Sophia von Kielmansegg (commonly referred to as the Sow). George I's wife Sophia Dorothea of Celle remained in Hanover, imprisoned at Ahlden House after her affair with Philip Christoph von Königsmarck – the blade in the song. Another historic personality in the song is John Erskine, Earl of Mar (Bobbing John) who recruited in the Scottish Highlands for the Jacobite cause. The nickname Geordie Whelps is a reference to the House of Welf, the original line of the House of Hanover.

== Lyrics ==
Cam ye o'er frae (Note: Cam ye o'er frae: came you over from) France? Cam ye down by Lunnon? (Note: Lunnon: London)
Saw ye Geordie Whelps (Note: Geordie Whelps: diminutive of George I. Whelp an ill-bred child. Guelph: a political faction to which the House of Hanover belonged.) and his bonny woman?
Were ye at the place called the Kittle Housie? (Note: kittle housie: tickle house (brothel))
Saw ye Geordie's grace riding on a goosie? (Note: goosie: diminutive of goose; nickname for the King's mistress Melusine von der Schulenburg, Duchess of Kendal)

Geordie, he's a man there is little doubt o't;
He's done a' he can, wha can do without it?
Down there came a blade linkin' like my lordie;
He wad drive a trade at the loom o' Geordie.

Though the claith were bad, blythly may we niffer;
Gin we get a wab, it makes little differ.
We hae tint our plaid, bannet, belt and swordie,
Ha's and mailins braid—but we hae a Geordie!

Jocky's gane to France and Montgomery's lady;
There they'll learn to dance: Madam, are ye ready?
They'll be back belyve belted, brisk and lordly;
Brawly may they thrive to dance a jig wi' Geordie!

Hey for Sandy Don! Hey for Cockolorum!
Hey for Bobbing John and his Highland Quorum!
Mony a sword and lance swings at Highland hurdie;
How they'll skip and dance o'er the bum o' Geordie!

(Repeat first verse)

=== Glossary ===
a, a' = adj all
bannet = n bonnet
belive (belyve) = quickly, soon, immediately
blade = a person of weak, soft constitution from rapid overgrowth; Count Philip Christoph von Königsmarck of Sweden
blithe = adj festive; glad; happy; joyful. n gladly, happily.
Bobbing John = John Erskine, Earl of Mar. So called because he switched sides 6 times before his death.
braid = broad
braw = adj fine; handsome; splendid; admirable; well-dressed; worthy
brawly = well
ca = v call
claith = cloth
cloth = George Augustus
cockalorum = a young cock, or little man with a high opinion of himself. Alexander Gordon, Marquis of Huntly
differ = n difference; dissent. v dissent.
Don = diminutive of Gordon (the last syllable).
drive a trade = metaphor for fornication - Count Philip Christoph von Königsmarck of Sweden's alleged affair with Princess Sophia Dorothea of Celle
gane = gone
gin = by the time, if, whether
goosie = Jacobite nickname for Melusine von der Schulenburg, Duchess of Kendal, mistress of King George I
ha = n hall; house; mansion.
ha's and mailins = houses and farmlands
hae = v have; take; credit (believe/think)
Highland hurdie = a Highland soldier
Highland quorum = either the hunting party on 27 August 1715 or the planning meeting on 3 September 1715
hurdie = buttock
Jocky = a Scotsman. James III
link = n skip; v walk smartly; to make love
linkin = tripping along
loom = a loom; a metaphor for female sexual organs
loom of Geordie = George I's former wife, Princess Sophia Dorothea of Celle
lordie = George I
mailing = a leased smallholding, a farm
mailings braid = broad farmlands
Montgomery = Sidney, Earl of Godolphin
Montgomery's lady = Queen Mary Beatrice of Modena, wife of James II and mother of James III
mony = adj many
niffer = haggle or exchange; to exchange, to barter with objects hidden in the fists
o'er = over; excessively; too
plaid = James III
Sandy = diminutive of Alexander.
Sandy Don = Major-General Alexander Gordon of Auchintoul
thrive = success
tint = lost; lost (past participle of tine = to lose)
to dance = to raise funds, to raise troops and prepare to fight. Compare the song To Auchindown, which has the lines: "We joined the dance, and kissed the lance, / And swore us foes to strangers."
to dance a jig with Geordie = To fight with George I.
wab = web (or length) of cloth); a length of woven cloth from one loom
wad = n pledge, security; wager, bet; forfeit. adj wedded. v pledge; wager, bet; wed.
wha = pron who

== Modern recordings ==
- Ewan MacColl and Peggy Seeger, Songs of Two Rebellions: The Jacobite Wars of 1715 and 1745 in Scotland. Smithsonian Folkways, 1960.
- The Corries, Bonnet Belt and Sword, 1967
- Steeleye Span, Parcel of Rogues, 1973
- Alastair McDonald, Bonnie Prince Charlie, 2003
