= Career portfolio =

Personal record of work achievements

Career portfolios help document education, work samples and skills. People use career portfolios to apply for jobs, apply to college or training programs. They are more in-depth than a resume, which is used to summarize the above in one or two pages. Career portfolios serve as proof of one's skills, abilities, and potential in the future. Career portfolios are becoming common in high schools, college, and workforce development.

Career portfolios help with a job or acceptance into higher education institutes. A career portfolio should be personal and contain critical information. Items that should be included include (but are not limited to) personal information, evaluations, sample work, a business portrait, and awards and acknowledgments. Career portfolios are often kept in a simple three-ring binder or online as an electronic portfolio and updated often. A career portfolio is used as a marketing tool in selling oneself for personal advancement. In some industries, employers or admission offices commonly request a career portfolio, so it is a wise idea to have an updated one on hand.

== Online portfolio ==
In the 21st century web technology has filtered its way into portfolios especially in the digital workplace job market. While traditional C.V. style portfolios still dominate the portfolio world it is common to back it up with a website containing personal statements, contact details, and experience.

More and more job seekers are building personally branded websites to validate and distinguish their skills, accomplishments, and experiences. Social websites such as LinkedIn and Twitter have become popular, as have services from websites that offer to host portfolios for clients. These web services provide users the tools to include all forms of digital media on their websites, including documents, images, videos, and audio files.

Resume reels and demo tapes are a type of portfolio. They are used by many in the arts such as musicians, actors, artists, and even journalists.

Creative Professionals also use portfolio-oriented websites as a means of presenting their work in a more professional and elegant manner.

== Industries ==
A typical type of portfolio is used by artists. An artist's portfolio consists of artwork that the artist can take to job interviews, conferences, galleries, and other networking opportunities to showcase his or her work and give others an idea of what type of genre the artist works in. Art Portfolios, sometimes called "artfolios", can be a variety of sizes, and usually consist of approximately ten to twenty photographs of the artist's best works. Some artists create multiple portfolios to showcase different styles and to apply for different types of jobs. For instance, one portfolio may be mainly for doing technical illustrations and another may be for surreal painting or sculpture.

Models and actors often use electronic portfolios to showcase their careers with a digital display of their photos, biographies, and skills. Talent portfolios can also include video.

Animators typically use demo reels, also known as "demo tapes", in place of or in addition to portfolios to demonstrate their skills to potential employers. Demo tapes have historically been short VHS tapes, but most are now DVDs. Demo reels are normally less than two minutes in length and showcase some of the animator's best works.

Another type of industry that can use portfolios as a developmental tool is schools at various levels. Teachers can use these portfolios as an asset to themselves and to their students. Students typically can use portfolios as a tool to select the types of work that they would like to include, reflect on the course work to make connections between the units learned, and help them learn critical thinking skills that are developed during the reflecting and selecting processes. For teachers, however, they are able to put controls on their student's portfolios to help the students throughout the portfolio process. Once the portfolios are completed by each student, the educators of the particular subject are able to look through each portfolio and find any areas that are commonly struggled on by the students. Once this common trouble area in a unit is found, the teacher can now figure out a new way/ adjust the assignments or teaching strategies that were used to educate the students on that particular subject area.

== Types of Portfolios ==
The three major types of portfolios are working portfolios, display portfolios, and assessment portfolios. Although the types are distinct in theory, they tend to overlap in practice. Consequently, a district's program may include several different types of portfolios, serving several different purposes.

== See also ==
- Elgg, an open source social networking platform primarily designed to be a Personal Learning Environment (PLE) and an Eportfolio tool.
