= Storm Force Ten =

Studio album by Steeleye Span
- Released: November 1977
- Recorded: September 1977
- Studio: Phonogram Studios, Hilversum, Netherlands
- Genre: British folk rock
- Length: 41:55
- Label: Chrysalis
- Producer: Steeleye Span, Mike Thompson

Steeleye Span chronology
Rocket Cottage (1976)	Storm Force Ten (1977)	Live at Last (1978)

Professional ratings
Review scores
Source	Rating
Allmusic	4/5 stars
Q	4/5 stars

Storm Force Ten is the tenth studio album by British folk rock band Steeleye Span, released in 1977 by Chrysalis Records. Until their 2013 album Wintersmith, released 36 years after Storm Force Ten, this album was the band's last production to reach the charts, topping out at 191 on Billboard's Pop charts. After Rocket Cottage, Bob Johnson and Peter Knight left the band. As there was still a contractual obligation, they invited Martin Carthy back again. Back in 1971 when Martin Carthy had joined he had recommended John Kirkpatrick but they decided on fiddler Peter Knight instead. This time they accepted his recommendation and Kirkpatrick's fiery accordion playing replaced Knight's fiddle.

John Tobler writes on the 1996 reissue of Storm Force Ten:

Steeleye's ninth original LP, Rocket Cottage was released in late 1976, and appeared only weeks before 'Anarchy in the UK', the debut single by The Sex Pistols, which may have contributed to the less than spectacular chart showing of the Steeleye LP. It was again produced by Mike Batt, but when the follow up to a Top 10 album fails to reach the Top 40, something is amiss.

The title may refer to the fact that Storm Force Ten is their tenth album or it may be a reference to tensions the band was experiencing after producing 10 albums in just 7 years and performing almost continuously during that period. Mike Batt pressured the band to record Rocket Cottage in only one week. The band nominally broke up after the album was released. Shortly after the album was released vocalist Maddy Prior released her first solo album, Woman in the Wings.

== Backgound ==
The band had occasionally sung quite long songs - "Long Lankin" on "Commoner's Crown", "The Victory" here, and "Montrose" (over 15 minutes) on their next (live) album. Arguably "The Victory" is the best of their long tracks because of the masterful variations in tempo, instrumentation and choice of voices. The biggest surprise was the inclusion of two Brecht songs. Martin Carthy had sung "Wife of the Soldier" on Byker Hill, using Brecht's words, but the music of Johnny Scott instead of the original music by Kurt Weill. The same arrangement is used here. PJ Harvey later recorded it, as did the Oysterband and Marianne Faithfull. "Pirate Jenny" (The Black Freighter) had been recorded by Judy Collins in the 1960s and it was later to be sung by Barbara Dickson. Maddy gives these two Brecht songs an appropriate flavour of cynicism. According to Hugh Fielder in the pop paper Sounds in 1977, there is an uncredited musician here - Mike Batt playing synthesizer.

The album is unusual in that it is the only Steeleye studio album that does not use a fiddle at all. Instead John Kirkpatrick plays accordion, giving the whole album a very distinct sound from the rest of the band's output. No other Steeleye studio album features an accordion, although Hark! The Village Wait features an English concertina on several songs.

The album cover is by the English commercial artist Adrian Chesterman, who was also responsible for creating album art for, amongst others, Motörhead for their 1979 Bomber album and Chris Rea for his 1989 The Road to Hell album.

== Reception ==
Q (May 2007, p. 135): "It was Steeleye Span who carried the British folk rock banner into the '70s, with Martin Carthy's guitar (plus honking accordions and the clear, high voice of Maddy Prior, the band's one constant through endless line-up changes) ringing out on this overlooked album. A shame they should make their most daring music just as punk torched the landscape."

== Personnel ==
Steeleye Span

- Maddy Prior – vocals
- Tim Hart – vocals, guitar
- Martin Carthy – vocals, guitar
- Rick Kemp – bass guitar, vocals
- John Kirkpatrick – vocals, accordion
- Nigel Pegrum – drums

== Track listing ==
1. "Awake, Awake" (Traditional) – 5:07
  A love song derived from the Song of Solomon.
2. "Sweep, Chimney Sweep" (Traditional) – 4:44
  This is from the Copper family, here sung a capella. (Roud 1217)
3. "The Wife of The Soldier" (Bertolt Brecht, Scott) – 2:40
  An anti-war song, a sentiment also on "Fighting for Strangers" on the band's previous album, Rocket Cottage.
4. "The Victory" (Traditional) – 8:37
  First published by John Ashton (in Modern Street Ballads) in 1888. According to Roy Palmer this is a re-writing of a ballad about General Wolfe.
5. "The Black Freighter" (Bertolt Brecht, Kurt Weill) – 5:59
  A barmaid in "The Threepenny Opera" has a fantasy about cutting rich men down to size. The song is also known as "Pirate Jenny".
6. "Some Rival" (Traditional) – 3:23
  This love song is possibly as old as 1656. Maddy sings it with a gentle acoustic guitar accompaniment. It is also known as "Some Tyrant" and "A Rival Heart" (Roud 587).
7. "Treadmill Song" (Traditional) – 6:11
  Treadmills were used in English prisons from 1779 to 1902. This was first written down in 1906 in Somerset. Also known at "The Gaol Song" or "Durham Gaol". (Roud 1077)
8. "Seventeen Come Sunday" (Traditional) – 5:09
  An early version of this song is by Robert Burns (1792). A tale of very young love. (Roud 277)
