= Allison Gross =

Traditional song

"Allison Gross" (Roud 3212, Child 35), also known as "Alison Cross", is a traditional folk ballad. It tells the story of "the ugliest witch in the north country" who tries to persuade a man to become her lover and then punishes him by a transformation.

== Synopsis ==
Allison Gross, a hideous witch, tries to bribe the narrator to be her lover. She combed his hair, first. When a scarlet mantle, a silk shirt with pearls, and a golden cup all fail, she blows on a horn three times, making an oath to make him regret it; she then strikes him with a silver wand, turning him into a wyrm (dragon) bound to a tree. His sister Maisry comes to him to comb his hair. One day the Seelie Court comes by, and a queen strokes him three times, turning him back into his proper form.

== Motifs ==
The horn motif is not clear. In "The Laily Worm and the Machrel of the Sea", the witch uses it after the transformation to summon her victim, but nothing appears to stem from it here.

The thwarted supernatural lover – nereid, fairy, elf, or troll – taking this form of revenge is a common motif; the tales are generally a variant on Beauty and the Beast, where the victim must live in that form until finding another love, as beautiful as the thwarted lover.

The transformation back being performed by the Queen of the Fairies, however, is a unique motif.

This ballad was one of 25 traditional works included in Ballads Weird and Wonderful (1912) and illustrated by the sculptor Vernon Hill.

== Written sources and recordings ==
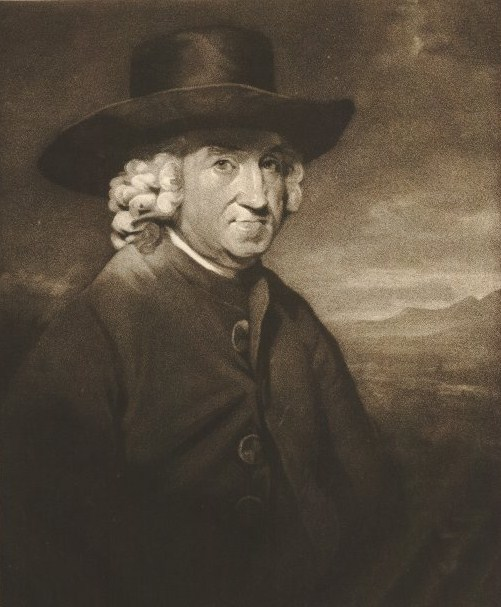
William Tytler

The ballad was provided by Mrs. Brown (née Anne or Anna Gordon) of Aberdeen, Scotland, recorded by her nephew, Robert Eden Scott, in 1783 (or "shortly before"), and in the same year it was sent by her father, prof. Thomas Gordon, to William Tytler with other 14 recorded songs (so-called Tytler-Brown MS). For "Allison Gross", no other source has been found. The ballad was first published by Robert Jamieson in his Popular Ballads in 1806. The Scottish traditional singer Lizzie Higgins sang a version in 1977 which can be heard via the Vaughan Williams Memorial Library website, but unlike most of her songs, it was probably derived from print rather than from her family tradition.

The first sung folk revival recording of Alison Gross was by Dave and Toni Arthur on their 1970 album Hearken to the Witches Rune (Trailer LEA 2017), three years before Steeleye Span recorded their British folk rock version on their Parcel of Rogues album. The music Steeleye composed for it was substantially more rock-influenced than most of their more folk music-influenced recordings, and they included a chorus that was not in Child's collection. The Steeleye Span version concludes with its narrator, having rebuffed the advances of Allison Gross numerous times, transformed into "an ugly worm". However, other recordings include the several additional verses chronicle his life after this, including his transformation to his proper form by the queen on Halloween. Also known as "Alison Cross", it was recorded by Elspeth Cowie and Malinky. The Norwegian folk-rock band Folque produced the song in Norwegian in 1974 on their self-titled album. The Czech folk band Asonance recorded this song in Czech in the year 2000. A spoken word version of the ballad was recorded by John Laurie in 1962 on the Folkways album The Jupiter Book of Ballads (Folkways Records FL9890). Hannah Rarity recorded her version of "Alison Cross" on her album Neath the Gloaming Star.

Oli Steadman included it on his song collection "365 Days Of Folk".

== See also ==
- List of the Child Ballads
