= Asonance =

Czech folk band

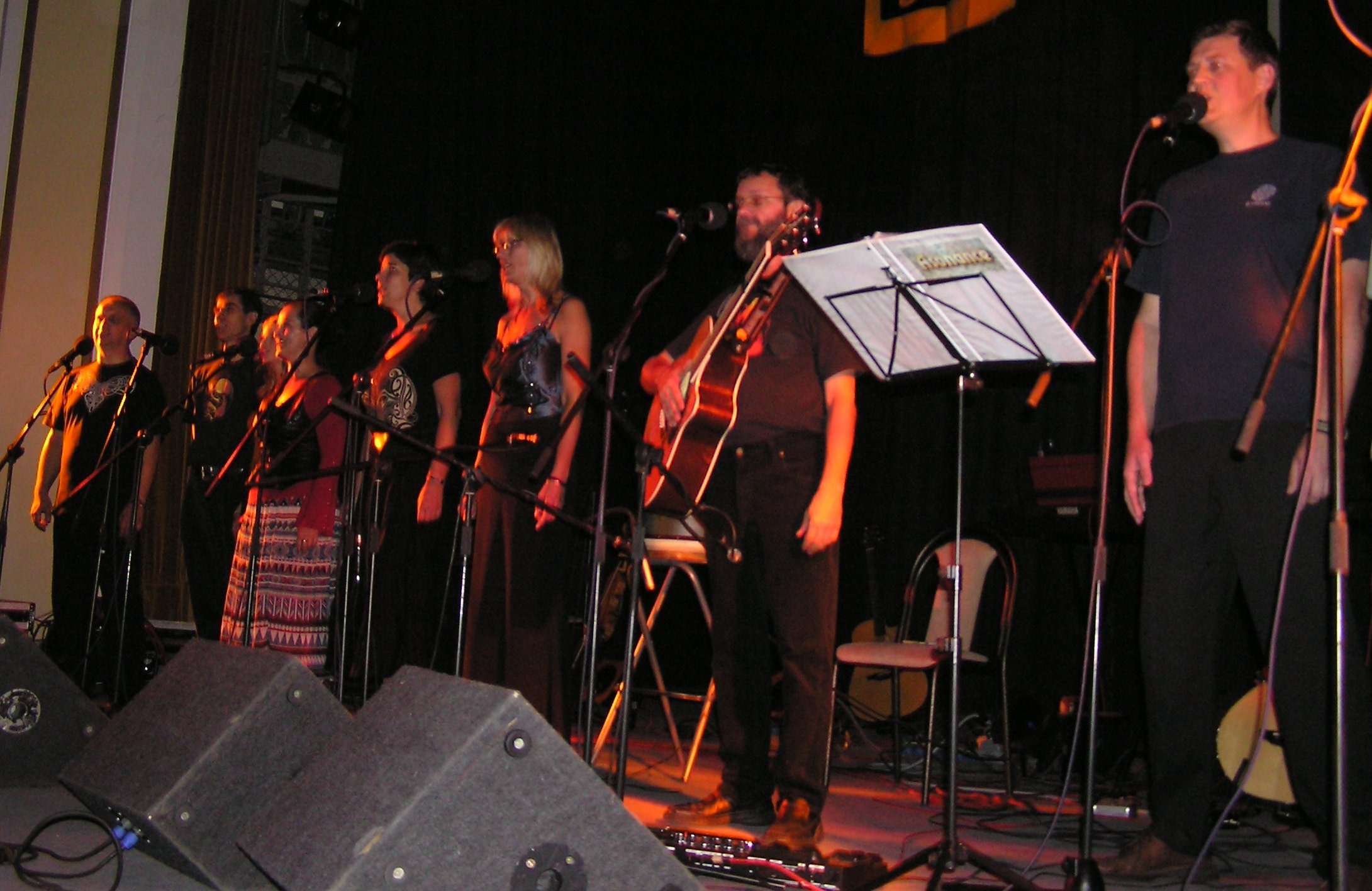
- Asonance in 2006

Background information
- Origin: Prague, Czechoslovakia
- Genres: Folk; Celtic music
- Years active: 1976–present
- Members: Jan Lašťovička; Blanka Lašťovičková; Jan Ráb; Roman Slaboch; Luboš Pick; Mirko Rokyta; Petr Bohuslav; Klára McMahon; Daniela Vránová; Jan Gajdoš Doležal
- Website: asonance.cz

Asonance is a Czech folk band established in 1976. They mainly play Scottish and Irish folk songs.

== History ==
Asonance was founded at Jan Neruda Grammar School in Prague, Czechoslovakia, in late 1976. Early members of the group include Jan and Pavel Lašťovička (the former is the last remaining founding member), Milan Štěrba, and František Korecký. The band primarily plays Scottish and Irish folk and country songs.

In 1977, Eva Fibingerová-Schneiderová and Denisa Vondráčková joined the band as vocalists, and Denisa also played guitar. Eva left the band a year later and was replaced by Blanka Štejfová (later Lašťovičková).

In 1980, Petr Vacek joined the vocal section of the band, and departed in 1984. He was replaced a year later by Roman Slaboch. 1990 saw Vacek rejoining the band. Other musicians who played with the group during this period include Renata Bělorová, Yveta Kasalická, Veronika Glyknerová, Alena Chvátalová, and Vendula Hugová, together with her husband, Jan Hugo. In 1982, Jan Ráb joined on violin.

Second violinist Jiří Nohel entered the group a few years later, and the twin violins became a trademark of the band. In 1985, Marta Fiklíková (later Nollová) joined, as well as Hana Horká. The band also added a double bass, bass guitar, and keyboards. Significantly for Asonance, future frontman Luboš Pick joined in the mid-1980s, and keyboardist Mirko Rokyta was added to the project in 1989.

Asonance replaced their lead singer with Petr Bohuslav, and drummer Aleš Zimolka also played with the band until his death in 2012. He was replaced by David Růžička. The band also enlisted whistle player and vocalist Klára Lašťovičková (later Fanta), as well as additional whistle players Anna Rábová and Anežka Kufová (later Trnková).

Longtime vocalist Hana Horká died on 16 January 2022 of complications from COVID-19, after deliberately exposing herself to the virus in order to get a health pass, instead of getting vaccinated.

== Band members ==
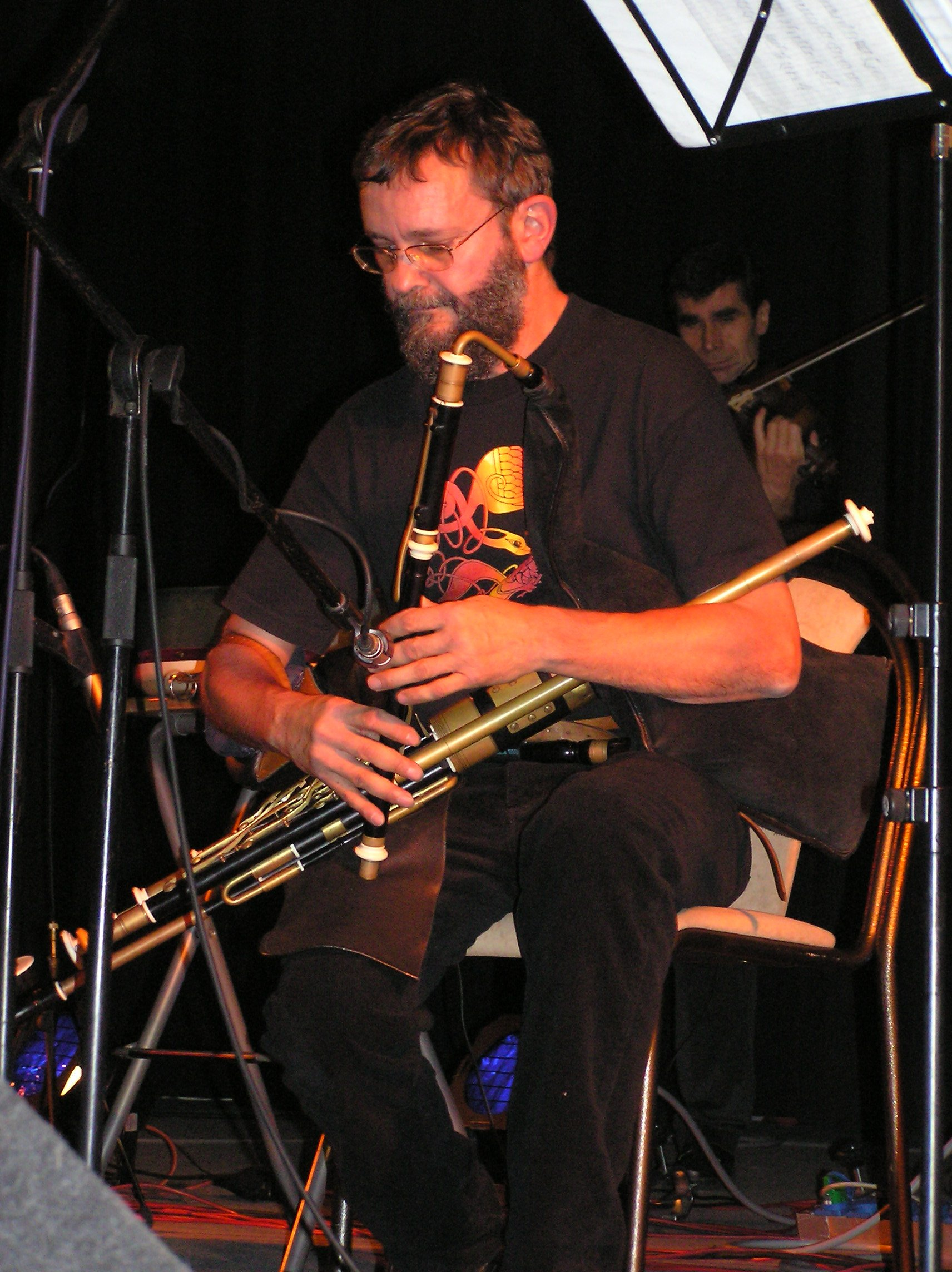
Jan Lašťovička performing with Asonance in 2006

Current

- Jan Lašťovička – uilleann pipes, bouzouki, guitar, vocals (1976–present)
- Blanka Lašťovičková – vocals, bodhrán, percussion (1978–present)
- Jan Ráb – violin (1982–present)
- Roman Slaboch – vocals (1984–present)
- Luboš Pick – bass guitar, guitar, bouzouki, vocals (1987–present)
- Mirko Rokyta – keyboards (1989–present)
- Petr Bohuslav – vocals (2002–present)
- Klára Fanta – whistle, flute, vocals (2005–present)
- Daniela Vránová – flute, whistle (2016–present)
- Jan Gajdoš Doležal – drums (2016–present)

Past

- František Korecký – (1976, 1979–1994)
- Milan Štěrba – (1976–1990, 1993–2002)
- Pavel Lašťovička – (1976–1986)
- Denisa Vondráčková – (1977–2011)
- Eva Schneiderová – (1977–1980)
- Petr Vacek – (1980–1984, 1993–1999)
- Renata Bělorová – (1981)
- Yveta Kasalická – (1983–1984)
- Jan Hugo – (1983–1985)
- Vendula Hugová – (1984–1985)
- Veronika Glyknerová – (1985)
- Alena Chvátalová – (1985–1986)
- Hana Horká – (1985–2022)
- Jiří Nohel – (1986–1990)
- Marta Nollová – (1986–2005)
- Bohouš Sýkora – (1997–2006)
- Aleš Zimolka – (2004–2012)
- Anna Rábová – (2006–2011)
- Anežka Trnková – (2011–2017)
- David Růžička – (2012–2016)

== Selected discography ==
Year	Original name	International name
1992	Dva havrani	The Two Ravens
1994	Duše mé lásky	My Lover's Soul
1995	Asonance 1 & 2	Asonance 1 & 2
1996	Čarodějnice z Amesbury	Susannah Martin
1997	Má pravá láska	As I Roved Out
1998	Asonance Live	Asonance Live
2000	Alison Gross	Alison Gross
2003	Vzdálené ostrovy	Na Hu O Ho
2006	Jestřáb	Coisich a Ruin
2008	30 Let Na Pódiu – DVD	30 Years Onstage
2010	Království keltů	Canan Nan Gaidheal
2014	Tesař z Nazareta	O Nach Eisdeadh
2018	Koncert v divadle Hybernia – DVD	Concert at Hybernia Theatre
2019	Návrat Krále	The Return of the King
2024	Malcolm	Malcolm
