= Technology integration =

Use of technology to aid education

Technology integration is the use of technology in classrooms to support student learning, as well as for school management. Technology integration includes practises such as virtual classrooms, gamified learning, and use of the internet to research and collaborate. The use of technology integration increased after the COVID-19 pandemic.

Studies have shown that technology integration is not always positive. Taking notes using a laptop instead of handwriting has been found to decrease the learning ability of students.
