= Harry Cox =

British singer

- Born: 27 March 1885; Barton Turf, Norfolk
- Died: 6 May 1971 (aged 86); Catfield, Norfolk
- Occupations: Farmworker, folk singer

Harry Fred Cox (27 March 1885 – 6 May 1971), was a Norfolk farmworker and one of the most important singers of traditional English music of the twentieth century, on account of his large repertoire and fine singing style.

His music inspired folk revival musicians including Shirley Collins, The Dubliners and Steeleye Span.

== Life ==
Harry Cox was born in Barton Turf in 1885, the seventh of thirteen children born to Robert Cox (1837–1928), a seaman, and Sarah Cox (née Nobbs) (1850–1944). His father and his paternal grandfather, also called Robert Cox (1807–1891), were noted singers in the local area. His family moved to the Potter Heigham / Catfield area in the 1890s.

He served in the Royal Navy in the First World War, worked at various farms in the local area and sang in pubs in Sutton, Potter Heigham and Ludham.

In 1927 at the age of 42, Cox married Elsie Amis, who died in 1951.

The English composer E.J. Moeran visited Harry Cox in 1921, incorporating some of his songs into his works. Some of the songs collected by Moeran were included in the Folk-Song Journal (1923). In 1934, Moeran arranged for Cox to be recorded by Decca Records in London.

In the 1950s and 60s, Peter Kennedy, the Lomax family and other folk song collectors recorded his songs and he occasionally made TV and radio appearances, gaining notoriety among folk music enthusiasts. In 1964 he was featured with fellow Norfolk singer Sam Larner in a TV film by Philip Donnellan, The Singer and the Song; this was released as an LP in 1966.

He died in 6 May 1971 at the age of 86. He was buried on 10 May in St Nicholas churchyard, Potter Heigham (his grave is unmarked as of August 2026).

== Repertoire and singing style ==
He had a huge repertoire of around 150 songs, which he learnt from his father, mother, grandfather, and others. Since his father was a seaman, his repertoire included lots of sea songs as well as local songs and ancient ballads. He claimed the song "Betsy the Servant Maid" (Roud 559) could be traced back two centuries (to c.1750) in his own family.

He also knew versions of the Child Ballads "The Outlandish Knight" "Georgie", "Bold Archer", "Blackhearted Gypsies" and "Our Goodman".

The Oxford Dictionary of National Biography concludes:

He is admired for the breadth and variety of his repertory, some 140 items ranging from rough bawdry to high balladry, but above all for his technique, based, according to the BBC producer Francis Dillon, on 'a carefully placed decoration, a beautifully judged phrasing, an exact control of highly complex rhythm and a singing tone which requires no accompaniment'.

Sarah Lifton, in The Listener's Guide to Folk Music (1983; p. 13), writes:

Cox's singing style was very straightforward and at first may seem colorless when compared with the vibrant style of, say Sam Larner, but its subtleties require repeated listenings to appreciate. Perseverance is rewarded, however, for Cox employed many of the traditional singer's devices effectively, if quietly, and produced many moving performances.

== Other musical activities ==
Cox also played the fiddle, melodeon and tin whistle, participated in traditional step dancing and made dancing dolls.

== Legacy ==
Harry Cox was amongst the most important traditional singers to have been discovered by folk song collectors in the twentieth century, along with others who include fellow Norfolk residents Sam Larner and Walter Pardon.

He had a significant impact on the 1960s folk revival, fascinating folk song enthusiasts. Many folk revival songs were based on Harry Cox's traditional versions, including Steeleye Span's "The Spotted Cow" on Below the Salt (1972) and The Dubliners' international hit single "The Black Velvet Band" (1967).

Harry Cox had a version of "She was a Rum One" (Roud 17938) with lyrics that bear a strong resemblance to the famous American folk song "The House of the Rising Sun"; it begins "If you go to Lowestoft, and ask for The Rising Sun, There you'll find two old whores and my old woman is one", providing important evidence that the song originated in England.

Shirley Collins met Harry Cox as a teenager in the 1950s. She later said the following:

A year or so later I listened to all of Peter Kennedy’s recordings of Harry, and the more I heard, the more convinced I was of his absolute greatness, how melodious and graceful was his singing and how perfectly paced. But he was never dull. He could make you smile with The Maid of Australia or move you with Polly Vaughan and his Death of Nelson is one of the most touchingly mournful songs I ever heard and does that great hero honour. Harry convinced you with every song that he sang. He was modest in his demeanour in spite of all the praise that was so rightly heaped on him, but he had learned and sung the songs, not to impress, but because he loved and valued them, and that was conveyed in his performances. Harry Cox had a rare grace and a genuine sweetness in both his person and his singing. I met him once and treasured it all my life.

He was awarded the gold badge of the English Folk Dance and Song Society in 1970.

== Discography ==
Solo albums

- Folk Songs – England (1956)
- Harry Cox – English Folk Singer (1965)
- Harry Cox Sings English Love Songs (1965)
- The Barley Straw (1975)
- Traditional English Love Songs (1977)

Compilations.

- Seventeen Come Sunday (1975)
- What Will Become of England? (2000)
- The Bonny Labouring Boy: Traditional Songs and Tunes From a Norfolk Farm Worker (Topic Records 2000)

Anthologies.

- Folk Songs of Britain (1961) reissued as Folk Songs of England, Ireland, Scotland and Wales

Vol 2 Songs of Seduction four songs

- Hidden English – Topic Records CD, TSCD600 (one song)
- The Voice of the People (1988)

Vol 1 Come Let Us Buy the Licence (one song)
Vol 2 My Ship Shall Sail the Ocean (one song)
Vol 12 We've Received Orders to Sail (three songs)
Vol 17 It Fell on a Day, a Bonny Summer Day (two songs)

- The Voice of the People Second Series (2012)

Good People, Take Warning (two songs)

- The Rough Guide to English Roots Music (1998, World Music Network)

(*) One track only

The Bonny Labouring Boy from the album of the same name is track thirteen on the first CD of the Topic Records 70 year anniversary boxed set Three Score and Ten.

== Other source ==
- Michael Grosvenor Myer, "A Visit to Harry Cox", Folk Review magazine, February 1973

== Bibliography ==
- Roy Palmer (2004). "Cox, Harry Fred (1885–1971)". Oxford Dictionary of National Biography (1 ed.). Oxford University Press. doi:10.1093/ref:odnb/57087.
