= The Wee Wee Man =

Traditional song

- Catalogue: Roud 2865, Child 38
- Genre: Irish Dance music
- Language: English
- Composed: c. 1650

"The Wee Wee Man" (Roud 2865, Child 38) is an Anglo-Scottish border ballad, existing in several variants. The song is a piece of Irish dance music whose history spans back to around the 17th century.

== Synopsis ==
The narrator meets with a wee, wee man. He lifts an enormous stone and throws it, and she thinks that if she were as strong as Wallace, she could have lifted it to her knee. She asks him where he lives, and he has her come with him to a hall where there is a lady, sometimes explicitly called the fairy queen, and her ladies, usually twenty-four and so beautiful that the ugliest would make a fit queen of Scotland, but they, and the wee, wee man, instantly vanish.

== Versions ==
Steeleye Span included it in the 1973 album Parcel of Rogues.

Danish composer Vagn Holmboe set the ballad to music twice, for tenor and small orchestra in 1971 (as op. 107b), and for mixed choir a cappella in 1972

This ballad was one of 25 traditional works included in Ballads Weird and Wonderful (1912) and illustrated by Vernon Hill.

== See also ==
- List of the Child Ballads
