= Commoners Crown =

Studio album by Steeleye Span
- Released: January 1975
- Recorded: September and October 1974
- Studio: Morgan, London
- Genre: British folk rock
- Length: 38:39
- Label: Chrysalis
- Producer: Steeleye Span, Robin Black

Steeleye Span chronology
Now We Are Six (1974)	Commoners Crown (1975)	All Around My Hat (1975)

Professional ratings
Review scores
Source	Rating
Allmusic	link

Commoners Crown is the seventh studio album by British folk rock band Steeleye Span, released in 1975 by Chrysalis Records. It was their second album with the band's most commercially successful line-up. The album reached number 21 in the UK album charts.

The album's title refers to a sculpture produced by Shirtsleeves Studio, which appears on the cover of the album. The sculpture is composed of hundreds of tiny human figures assembled to form a crown. The tiny figures also decorate the liner notes.

The album's cover can be seen in Stanley Kubrick's 'The Shining' approximately 1 hour, 10 minutes, 14 seconds in, at the beginning of the scene where Dick Hallorann (Scatman Crothers) is in bed watching TV.

== Description ==
By this point, the band had evolved into a full-fledged rock sound, comparable to Jethro Tull during its folk rock phase. Ian Anderson had produced their previous album Now We Are Six, and working with Steeleye Span had a major impact on Anderson's songwriting. Several of the tracks feature strong rock drumming and heavy guitar riffs, but the material remains almost entirely traditional folk music, with the exception of 'Bach Goes to Limerick', an attempt to interweave a classical Bach violin piece with a traditional Irish fiddle piece. Some fans were alienated by the band's new direction.

The lead track, "Little Sir Hugh" is based on a medieval song about Little Saint Hugh of Lincoln, a 13th-century boy supposedly murdered by Jews. The original song's lyrics are sharply and purposely anti-Semitic, but the band elided that content in their version.

The album is seen by fans as a highlight of the era for the band.

=== "New York Girls" ===
The band continued the whimsical streak demonstrated on Now We Are Six by inviting comedian and actor Peter Sellers to play the ukulele on the closing track, 'New York Girls'. The band decided that it wanted a ukulele on the song, but no one in the band knew anyone who played the instrument. Finally someone remarked that Sellers was known to play it competently, and they decided to approach him to appear on the song, even though none of them knew him at all. To their surprise, he agreed, and the song became one of only two recordings he made with a rock band. The other was 'After the Fox', recorded with The Hollies in 1966 for the film of the same title.

There was some difficulty tuning Sellers' Martin ukulele. So the engineers slowed the tape until he fit in properly. Eventually, Sellers started amusing himself by doing some voices from The Goon Show. The band had been sheepish about asking the comedian to do his famous voices and were delighted when he started improvising with them. The October 24, 1974 issue of Melody Maker features the band with Sellers striking a guitar god pose with his ukulele. On the original vinyl release, the song ended with Sellers saying "I say, are you a matelot? Careful what you say, sir – we're on board ship here." Subsequent CD releases omitted the quip, until 2009 when the 3-disc EMI box set A Parcel of Steeleye Span reinstated it.

The song is also unusual in that all the male band members (except Nigel Pegrum) take lead vocals on two verses each (Rick Kemp singing verses 1 and 5, Tim Hart 2 and 6, Peter Knight 3 and 7 and Bob Johnson 4 and 8). Maddy Prior sings the chorus. "New York Girls" was included in a 1993 box set of Peter Sellers' recordings.

== Track listing ==
1. "Little Sir Hugh" (Traditional) – 4:44
2. "Bach Goes To Limerick" (Hart, Johnson, Kemp, Knight, Pegrum, Prior) – 3:41
3. "Long Lankin" (Traditional) – 8:40
4. "Dogs and Ferrets" (Traditional) – 2:43
5. "Galtee Farmer" (Traditional) – 3:47
6. "Demon Lover" (Traditional) – 5:54
7. "Elf Call" (Traditional) – 3:54
8. "Weary Cutters" (Traditional) – 2:04
9. "New York Girls" (Traditional) – 3:12

== Personnel ==
Steeleye Span

- Maddy Prior - vocals
- Tim Hart - vocals, guitar, appalachian dulcimer
- Bob Johnson - vocals, guitar
- Rick Kemp - bass guitar, drums
- Peter Knight - violin
- Nigel Pegrum - drums, flute

Guest musician

- Peter Sellers - ukulele on "New York Girls"

== Certifications ==
Certifications for Commoners Crown
Region	Certification	Certified units/sales
United Kingdom (BPI)	Silver	60,000^{^}
^{^} Shipments figures based on certification alone.
