= Rocket Cottage =

Studio album by Steeleye Span
- Released: September 1976
- Recorded: June 1976
- Studio: Frans Peters Studio, Hilversum, Netherlands
- Genre: British folk rock; progressive rock
- Length: 43:07
- Label: Chrysalis
- Producer: Mike Batt

Steeleye Span chronology
All Around My Hat (1975)	Rocket Cottage (1976)	Storm Force Ten (1977)

Professional ratings
Review scores
Source	Rating
Allmusic	4.5/5 stars

Rocket Cottage is the ninth studio album by British folk rock band Steeleye Span. It was released in 1976 by Chrysalis Records. Produced by Mike Batt, it was hoped that the album would cement the band's popular and commercial success, building on their breakthrough into the UK Top 10 with their previous album All Around My Hat and its title track, which reached #5 on the UK singles chart. By the time it was released, the sudden explosion of the British punk scene saw audience tastes in the UK rapidly shift away from formerly popular genres like folk rock and progressive rock, and groups that previously been critical favourites, like Steeleye Span and Yes, soon found themselves being derided as "dinosaurs". Rocket Cottage did not reach the Top 40, and it was the last album recorded by the mid-seventies lineup of the group, with Peter Knight and Bob Johnson both subsequently leaving the group.

The album is perhaps the band's most rock-influenced album, with very prominent guitars and a strong rhythm section. Some fans consider this one of the band's best efforts, pointing to strong tracks like "London", "Fighting for Strangers", "Sir James the Rose", and "Orfeo/Nathan's Reel", the first three of which became classics of the band and fan favorites. Others, however, find the album erratic, complaining that the band's rhythm section tends to overwhelm the vocals, particularly on "Orfeo", "The Twelve Witches", and (to a lesser extent) "The Brown Girl". Oddly for an instrumental piece, "Nathan's Reel" simply fades out. The most peculiar decision was the inclusion of an unrehearsed version of "Camptown Races"; years later Maddy Prior remarked, "I can't think what we were thinking of with that."

Peter Knight has said that the band was being pressured to write and adapt music for the commercial market, which led to considerable dissatisfaction among the band members. Both he and Bob Johnson were seriously considering leaving the band, particularly because they wanted to work on a musical version of The King of Elfland's Daughter, Chrysalis Records agreed to allow them to record that album if they agreed to record 'Rocket'. Lacking any interest in the album that Knight and Johnson produced, Chrysalis made little effort to promote the album, and Knight and Johnson chose to depart the band after 'Rocket' was released.

== Track listing ==
All music is composed by Tim Hart, Bob Johnson, Rick Kemp, Peter Knight, Nigel Pegrum, Maddy Prior.

No.	Title	Length
1.	"London"	4:10
2.	"The Bosnian Hornpipes" (Traditional)	0:57
3.	"Orfeo/Nathans Reel"	5:57
4.	"The Twelve Witches" (Traditional)	4:30
5.	"The Brown Girl"	5:03
6.	"Fighting For Strangers" (Traditional)	4:22
7.	"Sligo Maiid" (Traditional)	3:42
8.	"Sir James The Rose" (Traditional)	6:11
9.	"The Drunkard" (Traditional. prefaced by Camptown Racetrack)	7:54
Total length:		42:50

== Personnel ==
Steeleye Span

- Maddy Prior – vocals
- Tim Hart – vocals, guitar
- Bob Johnson – vocals, guitar
- Rick Kemp – bass guitar, vocals
- Peter Knight – violin, mandolin
- Nigel Pegrum – drums
