= The Cruel Mother =

Traditional song

"The Cruel Mother" (a.k.a. "The Greenwood Side" or "Greenwood Sidey") (Roud 9, Child 20) is a murder ballad most likely originating in Scotland, or England that has since become popular throughout the wider English-speaking world.

According to Roud and Bishop

Widely collected in Britain and Ireland, and in North America, 'The Cruel Mother' has clearly struck a chord with singers over a number of generations. We will never know quite why, of course, but in performance the combination of the matter-of-fact handling of a difficult subject and the repeated rhythmic refrain often creates a stark and hypnotic tale, which is extremely effective.

== Synopsis ==
A woman gives birth to one or two illegitimate children (usually sons) in the woods, kills them, and buries them. On her return trip home, she sees a child, or children, playing, and says that if they were hers, she would dress them in various fine garments and otherwise take care of them. The children tell her that when they were hers, she would not dress them so but murdered them. Frequently they say she will be damned for it.

Some variants open with the account that she has fallen in love with her father's clerk.

== Variants ==
This ballad exists in a number of variants, in some of which there are verses where the dead children tell the mother she will suffer a number of penances each lasting seven years, e.g. "Seven years to ring a bell / And seven years porter in hell". Those verses properly belong in "The Maid and the Palmer" (Child ballad 21). Variants of "The Cruel Mother" include "Carlisle Hall", "The Rose o Malinde", "Fine Flowers in the Valley", "The Minister's Daughter of New York", and "The Lady From Lee", among others. "Fine Flowers of the Valley" is a Scottish variant. Weela Weela Walya is an Irish schoolyard version. A closely related German ballad exists in many variants: a child comes to a woman's wedding to announce himself her child and that she had murdered three children, the woman says the Devil can carry her off if it is true, and the Devil appears to do so.

Ballad scholar Hyder Rollins listed a broadside print dated 1638, and a fairly complete version was published in London in broadside ballad format as "The Duke's Daughter's Cruelty: Or the Wonderful Apparition of two Infants whom she Murther'd and Buried in a Forrest, for to hide her Shame" sometime between 1684 and 1695.

This ballad was one of 25 traditional works included in Ballads Weird and Wonderful (1912) and illustrated by Vernon Hill.

== Recordings ==
Album/Single	Performer	Year	Variant	Notes
False True Lovers	Shirley Collins	1959	The Cruel Mother	
Dear Companion: Bonnie Dobson	Bonnie Dobson	1960	The Cruel Mother	
The Folk Songs of Britain, Vol. IV: The Child Ballads 1	Thomas Moran	1961	The Cruel Mother	Recorded 1954. Although the refrain of this version is that of "The Cruel Mother", the actual verses belong to a different song, Child Ballad no. 21, "The Maid and the Palmer" (aka "The Well Below The Valley")
Four Strong Winds	Ian & Sylvia	1964	The Greenwood Side	
The Judy Collins Concert	Judy Collins	1964	The Cruel Mother	
The Long Harvest, Vol. 1	Ewan MacColl and Peggy Seeger	1967	see note	Album contains three versions of The Cruel Mother, one variant called "Down By the Greenwood Sidey-O", and another called "The Lady From Lee".
Ballads	Hedy West	1967	The Cruel Mother	
Joan	Joan Baez	1967	The Greenwood Side	
A Beacon from Mars	Kaleidoscope	1968	The Greenwood Sidee	
The Sweet Primroses	Shirley Collins	1970	The Cruel Mother	
Landfall	Martin Carthy	1972	The Cruel Mother	
The Voice of the People Vol. 3	Lizzie Higgins	1988	The Cruel Mother	Recorded 1975
Tempted and tried	Steeleye Span	1989	The Cruel Mother	
Duše mé lásky	Asonance	1994	Krutá matka	Czech translation
Legacy	Old Blind Dogs	1995	The Greenwood Side	The track is titled "The Rose and the Lindsey O'."
Ye Shine Whar Ye Stan!	Jock Duncan	1996	The Cruel Mother	
Live at Newport	Ian & Sylvia	1996	The Greenwood Side	Recorded live at the Newport Folk Festival, 1963.
Flesh and Blood	Maddy Prior	1997	The Cruel Mother	
Songs Of Experience	Cindy Mangsen	1998	The Cruel Mother	
Jolly Rogues Together	Simply English	1999	The Cruel Mother	
Shantalla	Shantalla	2000	Fine flowers in the valley	
Greenwood Side	Lothlorien	2000	Greenwood Side	
A Day Like Today	Emily Smith	2002	The Cruel Mother	
No Earthly Man	Alasdair Roberts	2005	The Cruel Mother	
Wolverley Summer of Love 2007	Stuart Estel	2007	The Cruel Mother	
To The Ground	Kerfuffle	2006	Down By The Greenwood Side	
In The Shadow of Mountains	Bella Hardy	2009	Cruel Mother	Miss Hardy omits 'The' from the title but it is nonetheless a variant of the folk song.
Lady Diamond	Bryony Griffith & Will Hampson	2011	The Lady of York	From the singing of Jim Eldon.
Born to wonder EP	Louise Jordan	2011	The Cruel Mother	
Here's to those we could not save	The Imaginary Suitcase	2012	Fine flowers in the valley	
Old Light: Songs from my Childhood & Other Gone Worlds	Rayna Gellert	2012	Cruel Mother	
Outsiders	Chris Foster	2013	The Cruel Mother	
Revival	Bellowhead	2014	Greenwood Side	
Fiona Hunter	Fiona Hunter	2014	The Cruel Mother	
Twice Told Tales	10,000 Maniacs	2015	Greenwood Sidey	
Anna & Elizabeth	Anna & Elizabeth	2015	Greenwood Sidey	
Murmurs	Nancy Kerr, Martin Simpson and Andy Cutting	2015	Cruel Mother	
Shirley Inspired	Graham Coxon	2015	The Cruel Mother	
The Essential Gretchen Peters	Gretchen Peters	2016	The Cruel Mother	Recorded 2011 and a bonus track on Blackbirds
Here in the Deep	Dave Heumann	2016	Greenwood Side	
CYRM	ØXN	2023	Cruel Mother	

Cruel Morher || Edan Archer || 2016 || Cruel Mother ||

== See also ==
- List of the Child Ballads
- Down by the Greenwood Side (opera)
