= Parcel of Rogues (album) =

Studio album by Steeleye Span
- Released: April 1973
- Recorded: January–February 1973
- Studio: Sound Techniques, London
- Genre: Folk rock, hard rock
- Length: 39:14
- Label: Chrysalis
- Producer: Steeleye Span, Jerry Boys

Steeleye Span chronology
Below the Salt (1972)	Parcel of Rogues (1973)	Now We Are Six (1974)

Professional ratings
Review scores
Source	Rating
Allmusic	4.5/5 stars

Parcel of Rogues is the fifth studio album by English folk rock group Steeleye Span. It was released in 1973 by Chrysalis Records. The album was their most successful album thus far, breaking into the Top 30.

The album grew out of a theatrical project the band undertook, a version of Robert Louis Stevenson's 1886 novel Kidnapped, staged in Edinburgh. The book and play were set against the backdrop of the Scottish Jacobite movement, and in the course of developing the play, the band came across a considerable amount of 18th-century Scottish poetry that they mined for the album.

If the album has a theme, it is change and the tension between old and new. "The Weaver and the Factory Maid" is about the tension of early industrialisation, with a young man celebrating the factory because there are plenty of women for him to pursue, while an old man denounces the factory because of its economic effects. There is a very sharp contrast between the sweet acoustically-driven "The Ups and Downs" followed immediately by the funky distorted loud guitar in "Robbery with Violins". "Cam Ye O'er Frae France" explores this tension in a different way, both in its lyric denouncement of political changes and in the contrast between the poem's traditional Scots language and its sharp electronic guitars. "Alison Gross" is about a literal change, as an evil witch transforms a man who rejects her into a worm.

"Robbery with Violins" is better known as "The Bank of Ireland" (in O'Neill's book). A version of this tune was played in the film Titanic. "The Ups and Downs" is also known as "The Maid of Tottenham". The satirical "Cam Ye O'er Frae France" refers to King George I and the Jacobite rising of 1715.

Hogg's Jacobite Relics included Cam Ye O'er Frae France and "Rogues in a Nation", the lyrics of which, later attributed to Robert Burns, denounce the negotiators of the 1707 Act of Union that united the Parliaments of Scotland and England, The title of the album derives from a line in the song "Rogues in a Nation", here sung a cappella.

The sleeve shows a milkmaid on decorated tiles, possibly alluding to the recording venue: "Sound Techniques" studio, a former dairy, which still has a statue of a cow on the wall.

The album uses more overdubbing than any previous album by Steeleye Span. On "Hares on the Mountain" there are two channels for Peter Knight's mandolins, two for recorders and one for him playing harmonium. On "The Weaver and the Factory Maid" Maddy Prior is heard on three channels, counterpointing herself.

The album saw the band re-introduce the use of drums, driven in part by Rick Kemp's background in rock. After the album was released, the band undertook a US tour, opening for Jethro Tull. Owing to this, the band decided to add a full-time drummer in the person of Nigel Pegrum. The drums took the band further in the direction of rock, as demonstrated by "The Wee Wee Man" and "Cam Ye O'er Frae France".

== Track listing ==
All songs Traditional, except where noted.

Side one
No.	Title	Vocals	Length
1.	"One Misty Moisty Morning"	Maddy Prior	3:30
2.	"Alison Gross"	Bob Johnson	5:29
3.	"The Bold Poachers"	Tim Hart	4:18
4.	"The Ups And Downs"	Bob Johnson with Maddy Prior and Tim Hart	2:45
5.	"Robbery With Violins"	Instrumental	1:47

Side two
No.	Title	Lyrics	Vocals	Length
6.	"The Wee, Wee Man"		Bob Johnson	4:01
7.	"The Weaver And The Factory Maid"		Maddy Prior	5:21
8.	"Rogues in a Nation"	Robert Burns	Maddy Prior, Tim Hart, Rick Kemp and Bob Johnson	4:34
9.	"Cam Ye O'er Frae France"		Maddy Prior	2:49
10.	"Hares on The Mountain"		Bob Johnson	4:33

== Personnel ==
Steeleye Span

- Maddy Prior - vocals
- Tim Hart - vocals, guitar, Appalachian dulcimer
- Bob Johnson - vocals, guitar
- Rick Kemp - bass guitar, drums
- Peter Knight - violin, viola, mandolin, piano, recorder, harmonium

== Certifications ==
Certifications for Parcel of Roguess
Region	Certification	Certified units/sales
United Kingdom (BPI)	Gold	100,000^{^}
^{^} Shipments figures based on certification alone.
