= Now We Are Six (album) =

Studio album by Steeleye Span
- Released: March 1974
- Recorded: December 1973 – January 1974
- Studios: Morgan, London
- Genres: British folk rock; progressive folk
- Length: 42:35
- Label: Chrysalis
- Producer: Ian Anderson

Steeleye Span chronology
| Parcel of Rogues (1973) | Now We Are Six (1974) | Commoners Crown (1975) |

Professional ratings
Review scores
| Source | Rating |
|---|---|
| Allmusic | 4/5 stars |

Now We Are Six is the sixth studio album by British folk rock band Steeleye Span. Its title (borrowed from Winnie-the-Pooh author A. A. Milne's collection of poems for children) refers to both its sequence among their albums, and the band's size, in light of the addition of drummer Nigel Pegrum. The album was released in 1974 through Chrysalis Records. It reached number 13 in the UK albums chart.

Although two session drummers had been employed on the group's debut, subsequent albums had seen little use of percussion. However, after Parcel of Rogues there was a conscious decision to add a full-time drummer to bolster the band's rock-oriented sound. Pegrum also contributed flute and oboe parts.

== Production ==
Now We Are Six was produced by Jethro Tull's Ian Anderson, although he admitted that his part in the making of the album was minimal except for a little supervision and the invitation of David Bowie to play the saxophone.

== Critical response ==
The album received mixed reviews from critics. It was hailed as a finely crafted set of traditional songs given clever arrangements, and the track "Thomas the Rhymer", which was released as a single, was seen by many as the quintessential Steeleye track. Another highlight is "The Mooncoin Jig", which is a showcase for Peter Knight's abilities on mandolin and banjo; the track is a mix of folk and rock.

The main criticisms of the album seemed largely to concern the inclusion of three tracks. The title track is a set of riddles sung by the band with only a piano accompaniment, and "Twinkle Twinkle Little Star" is the familiar children's song, given the same treatment. Credited as the "St. Eleye Primary School Junior Choir", the band sang these songs imitating children.

The final track raised comment among critics – a version of Phil Spector's "To Know Him Is To Love Him" which features, as a guest, David Bowie on alto saxophone. The inclusion of a rock 'n' roll standard baffled many listeners who had come to expect Steeleye Span's interpretations of traditional fare; what is generally not known, however, is that the track does represent an aspect of Steeleye Span's live show at that time (1974). They were known for doing a rock and roll encore during this period, influenced by the band Sha Na Na with whom they had performed. After ending their regular set, they would leave the stage and emerge a few minutes later, almost entirely unrecognizable, in '50s-styled rock and roll costumes, and play such numbers as "Long Tall Sally", "Da Doo Ron Ron", and the aforementioned "To Know Him Is To Love Him".

== "Thomas the Rhymer" ==
Two versions of "Thomas the Rhymer" were recorded. The song, also known as "True Thomas", was released as a single running 3:14, and as a longer LP version running 6:44. This version, which alternates loud and soft sections, was released on the original version of the Chrysalis UK LP Now We Are Six. When the album was issued in the United States, however, it included the short version, apparently on the assumption that the shorter version would be more radio-friendly and more appealing to American audiences. Most reissues of this album contain the short version of "Thomas the Rhymer" with the exception of the BGO CD reissue. Present--The Very Best of Steeleye Span, which was composed of new versions of the band's older material, includes a longer version of the song, running 6:38.

== 2011: Now We Are Six – live ==
For Steeleye Span's spring 2011 tour, the first half set consisted of them playing the album in its entirety, some 37 years after it was first released.

== Track listing ==
All songs traditional, except where noted. The track sequence varies a lot between different album editions.

1. "Seven Hundred Elves" (English translation of a Danish ballad, "Eline af Villenskov")
2. "Drink Down the Moon" (first half is Roud Folk Song Index #290, second half is #1506 and #5407)
3. "Now We Are Six" (Roud Folk Song Index #20174)
4. "Thomas the Rhymer" (Roud Folk Song Index #219, Child Ballads #37)
5. "The Mooncoin Jig"
6. "Edwin" (Roud Folk Song Index #182)
7. "Long-a-Growing" (Roud Folk Song Index #31)
8. "Two Magicians" (Roud Folk Song Index #1350, Child Ballad #44)
9. "Twinkle Twinkle Little Star"
10. "To Know Him Is to Love Him" (Phil Spector)

=== Shanachie CD release order ===
1. "Thomas the Rhymer" (short version)
2. "Drink Down the Moon"
3. "Two Magicians"
4. "Now We Are Six"
5. "Seven Hundred Elves"
6. "Long a Growing"
7. "The Mooncoin Jig"
8. "Edwin"
9. "Twinkle Twinkle Little Star"
10. "To Know Him Is to Love Him"

=== Australian 1974 order ===
A side:

1. "Thomas the Rhymer" (short version)
2. "Two Magicians"
3. "Edwin"
4. "Twinkle Twinkle Little Star"
5. "700 Elves"

B side:

1. "The Mooncoin Jig"
2. "Drink Down The Moon"
3. "Now We Are Six" (listed as 4th on album sleeve, but actually 3rd when the record is played)
4. "Long-a-Growing" (listed as 3rd on album sleeve, but actually 4th when the record is played)
5. "To Know Him Is to Love Him"

== Personnel ==
Steeleye Span

- Maddy Prior – vocals
- Tim Hart – vocals, electric guitar, acoustic guitar, electric dulcimer, banjo
- Peter Knight – vocals, violin, mandolin, tenor banjo, acoustic guitar, piano
- Bob Johnson – vocals, electric guitar, acoustic guitar, synthesizer
- Rick Kemp – vocals, bass guitar, acoustic guitar
- Nigel Pegrum – drums, tambourine, oboe, recorder, flute, synthesizer

Guest musician

- David Bowie – alto saxophone on "To Know Him Is to Love Him"
- Willie Tanner – bagpipes on "Thomas the Rhymer"

Production

- Ian Anderson – producer
