= Below the Salt (Steeleye Span album) =

1972 Steeleye Span album

Below The Salt

Studio album by Steeleye Span
- Released: September 1972
- Recorded: May – June 1972
- Studio: Sound Techniques, London
- Genre: British folk rock; folk
- Length: 39:42
- Label: Chrysalis
- Producer: Steeleye Span; Jerry Boys

Steeleye Span chronology
Ten Man Mop, or Mr. Reservoir Butler Rides Again (1971)	Below The Salt (1972)	Parcel of Rogues (1973)

Professional ratings
Review scores
Source	Rating
Allmusic	link

Below the Salt is the fourth studio album by Steeleye Span and their first after they joined the Chrysalis label. The album takes medieval influence and combines it with the band's British folk rock style. The lineup on the album includes Bob Johnson and Rick Kemp making their debuts in the band. By this point, Ashley Hutchings had left the band, leaving Tim Hart and Maddy Prior as the only remaining founding members.

The album was recorded in May and June 1972 at Sound Techniques studios in Chelsea, London. Tracks were mainly chosen by Hart and Prior, but it was Johnson who suggested the band add their Christmas hit "Gaudete". They self-produced the album because they could not yet find a replacement after Sandy Roberton departed.

"Gaudete" became the band's first hit, reaching number 14 on the UK charts. To give the impression of the choristers approaching and then moving away, the song was given a long fade-in and -out on the album. The single release, however, featured no fade.

The album reached number 43 in the UK album charts.

It was issued on CD by Shanachie Records in 1988 (79039).

== Track listing ==
All songs on the album are Traditional, adapted by Steeleye Span; sources as identified by Tim Hart in the album liner notes

1. "Spotted Cow" collected from Harry Cox of Norfolk — 3:09
2. "Rosebud in June" from the Journals of The Folk-Song Society collected from William King by Cecil Sharp in Somerset, 1904 — 3:42
3. "Jigs: The Bride's Favourite/Tansey's Fancy" — 3:13
4. "Sheep-crook and Black Dog" collected by Ewan McColl [sic] from Queen Caroline Hughes, a Roma then living in Dorset — 4:44
5. "Royal Forester" from the singing of John Strachan, first appeared in Halfway to Paradiddle (1293), an elementary drum tutor by Anchovy Ram — 4:35
6. "King Henry" #32 from The English and Scottish Popular Ballads edited by Francis James Child — 7:10
7. "Gaudete" (from Piae Cantiones, 1582) — 2:26
8. "John Barleycorn" collected by Fred Hamer from Billy Bartle in Bedfordshire, dedicated to Margaret Hamer — 4:49
9. "Saucy Sailor" from the Journals of the Folk-Song Society collected by George Butterworth in Sussex, 1907 — 5:53

== Personnel ==
Steeleye Span

- Maddy Prior - vocals
- Tim Hart - vocals, Appalachian dulcimer, guitar
- Peter Knight - violin, viola, mandolin, banjo, piano, vocals
- Rick Kemp - bass, drums, vocals
- Bob Johnson - guitar, vocals
