= New York Girls =

Sea shanty

"New York Girls", also known as "Can't You Dance the Polka," is a traditional sea shanty. It has a Roud Folk Song Index number of 486. It was collected by W. B. Whall in the 1860s. It was printed in 1910 in "Ships, Sea Songs and Shanties". An earlier book "Sailors' Songs or Chanties", first edition 1887, by Davis and Tozer contains a version, but does not specify when it was collected.

== Lyrics ==
The lyrics have many variations, but almost all versions contain this chorus, sung after each verse:

And away, you Santee
My dear Annie
Oh, you New York girls
Can't you dance the polka?

A less common alternate chorus is:

And away, you Johnny
My dear honey
Oh, you New York girls
You love us for our money

The lyrics are often a cautionary tale of a sailor being tricked by a pretty girl who spends all of his money and in some cases robs him. This is summed up in these verses found in some versions:

So come all you bully sailormen, take warning when ashore
Or else you'll meet some charming girl who's nothing but a whore
Your hard-earned cash will disappear, your rig and boots as well
For Yankee girls are tougher than the other side of Hell

== Recordings ==
The song has been recorded by many artists. Among them are:

- Bob Roberts, in a BBC Archive recording by Peter Douglas Kennedy (1950s)
- Alan Mills, Songs of the Sea (1957)
- The Kingston Trio, ...from the Hungry i (1959)
- Ian Campbell Folk Group, New Impressions (1967)
- Steeleye Span with Peter Sellers, Commoners Crown (1975)
- Gordon Jones and Bob Thomas, Children in Need (1987)
- Oysterband, Ride (1989)
- Cyril Tawney, Sailor's Delight (1990)
- 97th Regimental String Band, Brass Mounted Army: Civil war Era Songs, Vol. VII (1999)
- Roberts and Barrand, Across the Western Ocean (2000)
- Gaelic Storm, Tree (2001).
- Finbar Furey, Gangs of New York: Music from the Miramax Motion Picture (2004)
- Steve Tilston, Of Many Hands (2005)
- Bellowhead, Hedonism (2010)
- Scythian, Jump at the Sun (2014)

== In popular culture ==
- The song is featured in the 2002 film Gangs of New York.
- The song is featured in the 2014 video game Assassin's Creed Rogue.
- The song is featured in the 2018 film Fisherman's Friends.
