= Artist's portfolio =

Collection of the best works by the artist

The Artist's Study Portfolio by Niklas Robert Leffler in the Gothenburg Museum of Art

An artist's portfolio (sometimes referred to as a lookbook) is an edited collection of an artist's best artwork intended to showcase their style or method of work. A portfolio is used by artists to show employers their versatility by showing different samples of current work. Typically, the work reflects an artist's best work or a depth in one specific area of work.

Historically, portfolios were printed out and placed into a book (the folio). With the increased use of the internet and email, however, there are now websites that host online portfolios that are available to a wider audience.

== Photography ==
A photography portfolio can focus on a single subject. It can be a collection of photographs taken with a certain type of camera, in one geographic area, of one person or a group of people, only black & white or sepia photos, a special event, etc.

Many photographers use portfolios to show their best work when looking for jobs in the photography industry. For example, wedding photographers may put together a book of their best wedding photos to show to engaged couples who are looking for a wedding photographer. Photojournalists may take a collection of their best freelance work with them when looking for a job.

== Artist design book ==
An artist design book is a collection of photographs meant to show off a model, photographer, style, or clothing line. Sometimes they are made to compile the looks of other people such as a celebrity, politician or socialite. This is an especially popular term with fashion bloggers.

Artist design books, or ADBs, in their online form, can be described as "fashion diaries" because bloggers are constantly updating them on a daily or weekly basis.

It is common for stores or clothing designers to use an ADB to show off products.

== Web design ==
A web designer portfolio depicts web projects made by the designer. This portfolio is usually made as a website and it shows a front end part of the websites made by the web designer as well as the entire web project made from web designer's website wireframe. Such Webdesign Portfolios are even useful for Graphic Designers.
