= All Around My Hat (album) =

1975 album by Steeleye Span

Studio album by Steeleye Span
- Released: October 1975
- Recorded: July 1975
- Studios: Air, London
- Genre: British folk rock
- Length: 38:33
- Label: Chrysalis
- Producer: Mike Batt

Steeleye Span chronology
Commoners Crown (1975)	All Around My Hat (1975)	Rocket Cottage (1976)

Professional ratings
Review scores
Source	Rating
Allmusic	3/5 stars

All Around My Hat is a 1975 album by Steeleye Span, their eighth and highest-charting; it reached number 7 on the UK Albums Chart, and stayed on the chart for six months. It was produced by Mike Batt, who also produced their follow-up album Rocket Cottage. It briefly made the band a household name in the UK. In the United States it became the band's first album to chart, reaching number 143.

The title track was edited to just over three minutes long for single release (omitting the final verse) and became their highest-charting single, reaching No. 5 on the UK Singles Chart, with "Black Jack Davy" as its B-side.

In 1976 an edited version of a second track from the album, "Hard Times of Old England", was issued as a single, but did not chart.

The song "Dance with Me" is a version of a Scandinavian ballad, "Herr Olof och Älvorna".

The album cover and back was designed by John O'Connor, a friend of the band's guitarist Tim Hart, using an anamorphic projection that distorted the facial features of the band members but which looks correct when viewed from the side through special pinholes in the lyric sheet.

== Versions ==
The record label Mobile Fidelity Sound Labs reissued this LP in 1980 in a half-speed-mastered, Japan-pressed, limited-edition audiophile vinyl edition, as catalog number MFSL 1-027.

== Track listing ==
All tracks Traditional, arranged by Hart/Prior/Knight/Johnson/Kemp.

No.	Title	Length
1.	"Black Jack Davey"	4:19
2.	"Hard Times of Old England"	5:15
3.	"Cadgwith Anthem"	2:48
4.	"Sum Waves"	4:04
5.	"The Wife of Ushers Well"	4:36
6.	"Gamble Gold (Robin Hood)"	3:44
7.	"All Around My Hat"	4:11
8.	"Dance with Me"	3:55
9.	"Batchelors Hall"	5:47
Total length:		38:43

== Personnel ==
Steeleye Span

- Maddy Prior - vocals
- Tim Hart - guitar, vocals, dulcimer
- Bob Johnson - guitar, vocals
- Rick Kemp - bass guitar, vocals
- Peter Knight - violin, vocals, mandolin
- Nigel Pegrum - drums, flute

== Certifications ==
Certifications for All Around My Hat
Region	Certification	Certified units/sales
United Kingdom (BPI)	Gold	100,000^{^}
^{^} Shipments figures based on certification alone.

== Cover version ==
In 1996, one of the group's lead vocalists, Maddy Prior, contributed guest vocals to a Status Quo recording of the song "All Around My Hat", and when that band toured England that year with Steeleye Span as support, she joined them on stage to sing it as an encore. Released as a single, it reached No. 47.
