= All Around My Hat (song) =

Song
- Language: English
- Written: 19th century
- Songwriter: Traditional

The song "All Around my Hat" (Roud 567 and 22518, Laws P31) is of nineteenth-century English origin. In an early version, dating from the 1820s, a Cockney costermonger vowed to be true to his fiancée, who had been sentenced to seven years' transportation to Australia for theft and to mourn his loss of her by wearing green willow sprigs in his hatband for "a twelve-month and a day", the willow being a traditional symbol of mourning. The song was made famous by Steeleye Span, whose rendition may have been based on a more traditional version sung by John Langstaff, in 1975.

== Synopsis ==
A young man is forced to leave his lover, usually to go to sea. On his return he finds her on the point of being married to another man. In some versions he goes into mourning, with the green willow as a symbol of his unhappiness (willow is considered to be a weeping tree). In other versions he reminds her of her broken promise, and she dies mysteriously. In some versions he simply contemplates his lover left behind, without actually returning to find her being married. In other versions, the young man is a street hawker who is mourning his separation from his lover who has been transported to Australia for theft.

== Traditional versions ==
The song is found across most English speaking countries. Dozens of nineteenth century broadside versions of the song have been collected. The famous tune associated with the song is associated with Roud 22518 rather than Roud 567.

A version sung by a Mr. Verrall of Horsham, Sussex, England, was notated by the composer and folklorist George Butterworth in 1909, and the melody of this version can be heard via the Vaughan Williams Memorial Library. Ralph Vaughan Williams notated a version sung by a Mr. Harris of Little Burstead, Essex, in 1904, and another by Ellen Powell in Herefordshire the same year, the original manuscripts of which are also publicly available.

=== Field recordings ===
Several authentic recordings have been made of the song, mostly in North America.

The song seemed to have thrived in traditional communities in Nova Scotia, Canada, well into the twentieth century, where several versions were recorded by the folklorist Helen Creighton:

- Mrs. R. W. Duncan of Dartmouth, Nova Scotia, 1943
- Nina Bartley Finn of Dartmouth, Nova Scotia, 1943
- Neil O'Brien of Pictou, Nova Scotia, 1953, available on YouTube as part of the Helen Creighton collection album.
- Sandy Stoddard of Ship Harbor, Nova Scotia, 1953
- Ned McKay of Little Harbor, Nova Scotia, 1954

A handful of field recordings were also made in the United States.

- Jessie Anthony of Winchester, Massachusetts, recorded by Helen Hartness Flanders, 1946.
- The Ritchie sisters of Viper, Kentucky, recorded by Mary Elizabeth Barnicle, 1946.

== Commentary ==
The song has typical archetypal elements of the separated lovers, the interrupted wedding, and the inconsolable rejected lover. In the "Yellow Ribbon" variants, the adornment is a reminder of lost love, similar to Ireland's "The Black Velvet Band".

=== A traditional version and variant texts ===
A traditional version (sometimes known as "I will wear the Green Willow") in common use in the 1950s and 1960s was:

My love she was fair and my love she was kind too
And many were the happy hours, between my love and me
I never could refuse her, whatever she'd a mind to
And now she's far away, far o'er the stormy sea.

All 'round my hat I will wear a [or: the] green willow
All 'round my hat for a twelve month and a day
If anybody asks me the reason why I wear it
It's all because my true love is far, far away.

Will my love be true and will my love be faithful?
Or will she find another swain to court her where she's gone?
The men will all run after her, so pretty and so graceful
And leave me here lamenting, lamenting all alone.

All 'round my hat I will wear a green willow
All 'round my hat for a twelve month and a day
If anybody asks me the reason why I wear it
It's all because my true love is far, far away.

A variation of this had the following verse stanza:

My love she was fair, and my love she was kind
And cruel the judge and jury that sentenced her away
For thieving was a thing that she never was inclined to
They sent my love across the sea ten thousand miles away.

A version popularized by Steeleye Span used the traditional chorus (shown above) and these verse stanzas (from Farewell He):

Fare thee well cold winter and fare thee well cold frost
Nothing have I gained but my own true love I've lost
I'll sing and I'll be merry when occasion I do see
He's a false deluding young man, let him go, farewell he.

The other night he brought me a fine diamond ring
But he thought to have deprived me of a far better thing
But I being careful like lovers ought to be
He's a false deluding young man, let him go, farewell he

Here's a half a pound of reason, and a quarter pound of sense
A small sprig of thyme and as much of prudence
You mix them all together and you will plainly see
He's a false deluding young man, let him go, farewell he.

=== Textual variants ===
Sabine Baring-Gould printed a version in "A Garland of Country Song" in 1895. This version is very close to the best-known version, by Steeleye Span. This is probably a more recent variant of the nineteenth-century song.

- cf. "The Green Willow" ("All around my hat" lyrics)

=== Songs that refer to All Around My Hat (song) ===
Jasper Carrott sang a parody, "It's my bloody ribbon and it's my bloody hat", at the Cambridge Folk Festival in 1976. The parody song was later covered by The Bad Shepherds and played regularly in their live concerts.

=== Motifs ===
Motifs of the song include separated lovers, a broken token, and death for love, common themes in tragic love songs.

=== Television and stage references ===
In the 'Watching TV' episode of British television sitcom Men Behaving Badly, Gary and Dorothy repeatedly end up singing the Steeleye Span version of the song while trying to remember the theme tune to Starsky and Hutch. Paul Whitehouse also sings the first lines of the song in an episode of The Fast Show, changing a key word in each line with "arse".

It features prominently in the plot of the episode "The Prisoner" in "The Adventures of Robin Hood (TV series)". It is claimed to be a favorite song of the 12th century crusading King Richard The Lionheart and is constantly sung by the king's courier who has been secretly imprisoned in Prince John's dungeon. The tune is so charismatic that a prison guard sings it while drinking at a tavern and is overhead by Robin Hood, thus alerting Robin of the courier's fate.

In Episode 6 of the Russian science fiction serial Better than Us, a young woman idly sings this song to herself while waiting for Safronov to appear.

The song is referred to in the 1964 play Philadelphia, Here I Come! by Brian Friel.

== Commercial recordings ==
Album/Single	Performer	Year	Variant	Notes
It's Shirley!	Shirley Abicair	1958	Green Willow	
The Voice of the People volume 6	Eddie Butcher	1955	Another Man's Wedding	
Sings American and English Folk Songs and Ballads	John Langstaff	1959	All Around My Hat	Listed on the label as "All 'Round My Hat" and sourced from S. Baring-Gould's anthology. (Tradition Records, TLP 1009)
Now Is the Time for Fishing	Sam Larner	1959–1960	Green Broom	In this version, a Cockney costermonger vowed to be true to his fiancée, who had been sentenced to seven years transportation to Australia for theft, and to mourn his loss by wearing green willow sprigs in his hatband for "a twelve-month and a day", in a traditional symbol of mourning.
"Maritime Folk Songs" (anthology by Helen Creighton)	Neil O'Brien	1962	All Around My Hat	American version.
"Mainly Norfolk"	Peter Bellamy	1968	All Around My Hat.	
From the Beggar's Mantle	Barbara Dickson	1972	The Orange and the Blue	This is a Scottish version. A couple vow loyalty to each other before the man goes to sea. He returns just as his "inconstant lover" is about to be married to someone else. He points out her treachery, and she dies mysteriously before the night of the honeymoon. He goes into mourning, wearing the willow for twelve months, followed by a coat of orange and blue.
All Around My Hat	Steeleye Span	1975	All Around My Hat/Farewell He	This British folk rock group took it to number 5 on the charts, with the original version interpolated with lyrics from another early 19th century song, "Farewell He". This turned the song into a conversation, with the original words of constancy alternating with a sermon to young girls on the inconstancy of young men. This is the only Steeleye Span song later covered by a mainstream band (Status Quo, below).
All Around My Hat	José Hoebee	1986	All Around My Hat	José Hoebee (of Dutch girl group Luv') recorded a cover version of the song inspired by Steeleye Span's rendering.
Don't Stop	Status Quo	1996	All Around My Hat	Status Quo invited Maddy Prior (of Steeleye Span) to sing harmony.
Hat Trick (album)	The Mollys	1997	All Around My Hat	Songwriter Nancy McCallion and lead vocalist Catherine Zavala of the American group The Mollys revised the song in a humorous vein. The female protagonist pledges to be true to her departed lover "for a twelve-month and a day", and then speculates as to which of several men she may choose to replace him, if he does not return in time.
Three Quarter Ale	Three Quarter Ale	2003	All Around My Hat/Farewell He	Three Quarter Ale invited Lindsay Smith to sing the final verse on it.
Different Tongues	Brian Peters	2003	All Around My Hat	

=== Musical variants ===
- "She Wore a Yellow Ribbon"

=== Other songs with the same tune ===
- "The Death of Brush"
- "The Jolly Miller"
- "The Death of Brugh"
- "Unter meinem Hut" by the GDR Band Oktoberklub
