= Gift (Eliza Carthy & Norma Waterson album) =

Studio album by Eliza Carthy and Norma Waterson
- Released: July 13, 2010
- Genre: Folk
- Length: 54:32
- Language: English
- Label: Topic Records
- Producer: Eliza Carthy; Oliver Knight

Professional ratings
Review scores
Source	Rating
The Daily Telegraph	5/5 stars
The Financial Times	4/5 stars
The Guardian	5/5 stars

Gift is the first joint album released by mother-and-daughter English folk music duo Eliza Carthy and Norma Waterson. It was the winner of the Best Album category of the 2011 BBC Radio 2 Folk Awards, where its opening track "Poor Wayfaring Stranger" also won Best Traditional Track.

== Reception ==
The album received positive reviews. In a five-starred review for The Guardian, Robin Denselow described it as "both bravely straightforward and powerfully emotional" and "impressive, even by their standards".

Writing for Bright Young Folk, Liz Osman said that Gift "is a simple non-showy album, and feels like a labour of love between mother and daughter. That warmth of purpose comes through in the delivery of every track, as well as the sleeve notes and album artwork. The calibre of each song, the arrangements and performance make Gift a wonderful collaborative album from two of the country’s best singers".

== Track listing ==
No.	Title	Length
1.	"Poor Wayfaring Stranger"	6:30
2.	"Pretty Grey Hawk"	3:23
3.	"Boston Burglar"	5:25
4.	"The Nightingale / For Kate"	5:58
5.	"Bonaparte's Lament"	3:21
6.	"The Rose and the Lily"	6:18
7.	"Bunch of Thyme"	5:52
8.	"Ukulele Lady / (If Paradise Is) Half as Nice"	4:53
9.	"Psalm of Life"	6:09
10.	"Prairie Lullaby"	3:48
11.	"Shallow Brown"	2:55
Total length:		54:32

== Personnel ==
- Eliza Carthy – vocals (tracks 1, 2, 4–11), fiddle (tracks 2, 4–7, 9), bells (track 4), octave violin (track 4), organetta (tracks 4, 9), mandolin (track 5), piano (tracks 6, 9), viola (track 7)
- Norma Waterson – vocals (tracks 1–3, 5–9, 11), triangle (track 5)
- Anne Waterson – vocals
- Marry Waterson – vocals
- Mike Waterson – vocals
- Aidan Curran – guitar, mandolin
- Danny Thompson – double bass
- Martin Simpson – banjo
- Martin Carthy – guitar, vocals
- Chris Parkinson – melodeon
- Oliver Knight – cello, electric guitar, vocals
- Saul Rose – melodeon
- Roger Williams – trombone
