= The Waterson Family: A Mighty River of Song =

A Mighty River of Song

Music Concert by The Waterson Family
- Date: 12 May 2007
- Venue: Royal Albert Hall, London
- Performers: The Waterson Family; Brass Monkey; The Goathland Plough Stots
- Website: http://www.watersoncarthy.com/

A Mighty River of Song was a unique concert performance by various members of the Waterson family on 12 May 2007 at the Royal Albert Hall in the South Kensington area of London, England.

The concert was intended to celebrate the fortieth anniversary of the original Watersons playing the same venue shortly prior to disbanding in the late 1960s. Performers at the concert included various former members of 'The Watersons', current and former members of Waterson–Carthy and a number of other Waterson family members. The concert also included a short performance by Brass Monkey which was intended to re-launch the band after the death of their founder member Howard Evans in 2006. Eliza Carthy also accompanied the traditional Yorkshire long sword team the Goathland Plough Stots in the performance of two dances. During the course of the evening Eliza Carthy was presented with the prestigious Gold Badge of the English Folk Dance and Song Society.

The concert was promoted by the Derbyshire based arts consultants and event organisers Mrs Casey Music.

== Performers ==
The Waterson Family:

- Davoc Brady
- Eleanor Waterson
- Rachel Straw
- Anne Waterson
- Tim Van Eyken
- Martin Carthy
- Norma Waterson
- Mike Waterson
- Maria Gilhooley
- Eliza Carthy
- Saul Rose
- Oliver Knight

Brass Monkey:

- Martin Carthy
- John Kirkpatrick
- Roger Williams
- Martin Brinsford

The Goathland Plough Stots:

- Characters: Keith Thompson, Malcolm Worley & Les Atkinson
- Dancers: Jack Atkinson, David Atkinson, Daniel Atkinson, Allan Davies, Ian Davies & John Atkinson
- Musicians: Eliza Carthy, Steve Peirson, Andrew Smith & Sally Atkinson
- Plough Boys: Elliot Mayes, Kyle Skelton, Alexander & Mikey Simmonds
