= Early Days (The Watersons album) =

Compilation album by The Watersons
- Released: 1994
- Genre: Folk
- Length: 77:32
- Producer: Bill Leader

Professional ratings
Review scores
| Source | Rating |
|---|---|
| Allmusic | 3/5 stars |

Early Days is a compilation album of recordings by The Watersons, released in 1994.

These recordings come from New Voices (an anthology) (1965), The Watersons (1966) and A Yorkshire Garland (1966). There is a guitar on tracks 8, 10 and 11. Although it seems totally unremarkable now, at the time these recordings were made, The Watersons looked radical. Their appearance on stage was totally blue-collar and without any kind of showmanship. "Rap Her to Bank" is a previously unreleased track recorded in 1966.

== Track listing ==
All songs Traditional; except where indicated

1. "Boston Harbour"
2. "Greenland Whale Fisheries"
3. "Three Score and Ten"
4. "The Broom of Cowdenknowes"
5. "King Arthur's Servants"
6. "Rap Her to Bank"
7. "Dido, Bendigo"
8. "The North Country Maid"
9. "Brave Woolfe"
10. "The Jolly Waggoners"
11. "I Am a Rover"
12. "Fathom the Bowl"
13. "The Thirty-Foot Trailer" (Ewan MacColl)
14. "The Holmfrith Anthem"
15. "Twanky-Dillo"
16. "The White Hare of Howden"
17. "All For Me Grog"
18. "The Poacher's Fate"
19. "The Tour of the Dales"
20. "Willy Went to Westerdale"
21. "L'Anson's Racehorse"
22. "The Ploughboy"
23. "The White Cockade"
24. "Ye Noble Spectators"
25. "Stow Brow"
26. "The Wanton Wife of Canongate"
27. "The Whitby Lad"

== Personnel ==
- Norma Waterson - vocals
- Mike Waterson - vocals
- Elaine Waterson - vocals
- John Harrison - vocals
