= Because It's There =

Studio album by Martin Carthy
- Released: 1979
- Recorded: 1979
- Studio: Riverside Studios, London
- Genre: Folk
- Length: 41:47
- Label: Topic
- Producer: Ashley Hutchings

Martin Carthy chronology
Crown of Horn (1976)	Because It's There (1979)	Out of the Cut (1982)

Professional ratings
Review scores
Source	Rating
Allmusic	3/5 stars

Because It's There is an album by Martin Carthy, released in 1979. It was re-issued by Topic Records on CD in 1995.

== Track listing ==
All songs "Traditional; arranged by Martin Carthy" unless noted otherwise. The Roud number refers to the Roud index of folk songs number and the Child number is from the Child Ballad numbering.

1. "Nothing Rhymed" (Gilbert O'Sullivan) – 2:10
2. "May Song" (Roud 305) – 2:49
3. "Swaggering Boney" (instrumental) – 2:46
4. "Lord Randall" (Roud 10, Child 12) – 4:16
5. "Long John, Old John and Jackie North" (Roud 3100, Child 251) – 6:05
6. "Jolly Tinker" (Roud 863)– 3:01
7. "Lovely Joan" (Roud 592)– 3:14
8. "Three Cripples" (Roud 2422)– 3:06
9. "Siege of Delhi" (instrumental) – 4:18
10. "Nothing Rhymed" (reprise) (Gilbert O'Sullivan) – 1:18
11. "Death of Young Andrew" (Roud 6740, Child 48) – 8:37

== Personnel ==
- Martin Carthy – vocals, acoustic guitar, mandolin (6), electric guitar (7)
- John Kirkpatrick – accordion (1,7,8,10), concertina (2,6)
- Howard Evans – trumpet (6,7)
- Bruce Rowland – percussion (2,9)
- uncredited – Jew's harp (6)

Technical

- Ashley Hutchings – production
- Jerry Boys - engineer
- Keith Morris - photography
- Kirkpatrick and Evans appeared on Carthy's Out of the Cut released in 1984, only to follow as two fifths of the band Brass Monkey.
