= Laurence Price =

British 17C balladeer and pamphleteer

Laurence Price (fl. 1624–1667?) was a writer of ballads and pamphlets in England. His close links to the publishing trade over a period of nearly forty years make it likely that he lived in London for most, if not all, of his life. He was strongly influenced by the works of Nicholas Breton and Thomas Deloney, turning to them for inspiration at various points in his career.

Price may have performed and sold his ballads himself, which is suggested by Price's close relationship with stationer Francis Grove, a prolific producer of cheap print in the 1640s and 1650s, who is known to have employed ballad singers (Bridewell court book 9, p. 645, 1 March 1654.).

In the 1650s, with his former friends and acquaintances John Lookes, Martin Parker, and John Taylor all silenced by death, Price was quoted as "among the most popular and prolific writers of the decade." This was reflected in the accolade of being frequently named as an author in the Stationers’ registers. In 1656 Price was named as one of the ‘glorious three’ popular writers, alongside Humphrey Crouch and Samuel Smithson. In 1660, the Price and Grove partnership welcomed the restoration of the monarchy with one of the most enduring political ballads of the century, Win at First, Lose at Last.

Price wrote across a range of genres, from bawdy song (in his earlier years), to moral exhortation, horror stories, merry tales, and shortened versions of literary classics. Price demonstrated strong storytelling ability, evident in his Witch of the Woodlands (1655) and his re-telling of The Famous History of Valentine and Orson. His uncluttered style was particularly accessible, not only to his seventeenth-century readers, who included women and children—notably the young and newly enthusiastic Anthony Wood—but also to the audiences of later ages.

Many of his ballads were continually reprinted over a century or more, including A Warning for All Lewd Livers (1633), A Warning for Married Women Being an Example of Mrs. Jane Reynolds (1657), Flora's Farewell (1656), and Win at First (1660). The enduring quality of Price's songs is marked by the numerous titles captured by Francis James Childs via a nineteenth-century oral tradition, which are still performed and enjoyed today. For example, a more melodramatic version of Price's The Famous Flower of Serving Men (1656) was recorded in 1972 by folk singer Martin Carthy.

Price was unswervingly loyal first to the Church of England and second to an unequivocally protestant monarchy. During the interregnum, he attacked the rise of sects, especially Quakers, and bitterly lamented the decline of the church. In his final years, Price concentrated on writing godly pamphlets and sermons, such as The Ready Way to Salvation (1665), which not only appeared regularly in London publishers’ book lists but were frequently reprinted in colonial America and remained popular for more than a century.

A 1986 article in Sociological Review, using the 1896 Dictionary of National Biography entry as a starting point, found Price to be the then-unidentified "L.P.", author of several well-known broadsheet ballads including "A Warning for Married Women ". The author quotes Hyder Edward Rollins as describing Price as "almost the last of the distinguished line of ballad-writers that began in 1559 with William Elderton (or in 1512 with John Skelton)"
