= The Friar in the Well =

Traditional song

The Friar in the Well (Roud 116, Child 276) is a traditional English-language folk song.

== Synopsis ==
A friar tries to seduce a maiden. She cites fear of hell for refusing. He says he could whistle her out. She hangs a cloth in front of the well and invites him home, with directions to bring money. Then, she declares that her father is coming and tells him to hide behind the cloth. He falls in. When he pleads for help, she tells him that if he can get her out of hell, he can whistle himself out of the well. Sometimes she reminds him that St. Francis never taught his friars to seduce maidens. Eventually she helps him out, refuses to return his money, and sends him home, dripping wet. The story spreads, and she is commended for her cleverness.

== Recordings ==
Martin Carthy recorded a version on his album Out of the Cut and played it with Brass Monkey at Barnsley Acoustic Roots Festival in 2012.
