= Norma Waterson (album) =

Studio album by Norma Waterson
- Released: 1996
- Studios: Ocean Way Studio 2, Los Angeles
- Genre: Folk
- Length: 45:03
- Label: Hannibal
- Producer: John Chelew

Norma Waterson chronology
Norma Waterson (1996)	The Very Thought of You (1999)

Professional ratings
Review scores
Source	Rating
AllMusic	4/5 stars
Encyclopedia of Popular Music	5/5 stars

Norma Waterson is the debut solo studio album by Norma Waterson. The album was nominated for the 1996 Mercury Music Prize.

== Track listing ==
Norma Waterson track listing
No.	Title	Writer(s)	Length
1.	"Black Muddy River"	Jerry Garcia, Robert Hunter	4:19
2.	"St Swithins Day"	Billy Bragg	2:55
3.	"God Loves a Drunk"	Richard Thompson	4:40
4.	"The Birds Will Still Be Singing"	Elvis Costello	2:56
5.	"There Ain't No Sweet Man That's Worth the Salt of My Tears"	Fred Fisher	2:53
6.	"Rags and Old Iron"	Oscar Brown, Jr	4:17
7.	"Pleasure and Pain"	Ben Harper	6:03
8.	"Hard Times Heart"	Norma Waterson	3:18
9.	"There Is a Fountain in Christ's Blood"	Traditional	3:47
10.	"Ana Dixie"	Lal Waterson	3:41
11.	"Outside the Wall"	John B. Spencer, Graeme Taylor	6:15

== Personnel ==
=== Musicians ===
- Norma Waterson – vocals
- Martin Carthy – acoustic guitar
- Eliza Carthy – fiddle, backing vocals
- Richard Thompson – electric guitar, acoustic guitar
- Danny Thompson – double bass
- Roger Swallow – drums
- Benmont Tench – keyboards (2)

=== Technical ===
- John Chelew – producer
- Larry Hirsch – engineer
- Joe Boyd – production consultant
- Tim Young – mastering
