= Swan Arcade =

British folk music vocal group

- Origin: Bradford, Yorkshire
- Genres: Folk Music; British folk revival A cappella
- Years active: 1971–1978, 1981–1991
- Labels: Trailer Records, Fellside Records
- Past members: Dave Brady; Heather Brady; Jim Boyes; Royston Wood; Brian Miller; Kevin Hingston; Jack French; Chris Taylor
- Website: www.swanarcade.com

Swan Arcade were a British folk music vocal group formed in 1971. "A leading light of the British folk revival" they sang a wide variety of songs, especially traditional folk music, but with occasional forays into blues, pop and rock and roll, mostly performed a cappella. Swan Arcade also performed with The Watersons as the Boggle Hole Chorale, and The Watersons and Martin Carthy as Blue Murder. They finally disbanded in 1991, but one of their members, Jim Boyes, still performs as part of Coope Boyes and Simpson.

== Formation ==
The group was formed in Bradford, Yorkshire, in 1971 by Dave Brady (b Dave Christopher Bradley, 12 August 1943 at Ilkley, Yorkshire) his wife, Heather Brady (née Johnston b Heather Margaret Johnston, 13 June 1943 at Dagenham) and bass vocalist Jim Boyes (b 14 November 1945 at Bridlington, Yorkshire) Despite having lost an arm in a motorcycle accident, Dave Brady also played concertina by holding it between his knees, and also played synthesiser and bass. Heather Brady played dulcimer and cello, whilst Boyes occasionally played guitar. The trio were well-matched vocalists, and the band became known for its close harmony, a cappella singing, and the use of a wide variety of influences, including blues, pop and rock and roll. They performed songs such as "Paperback Writer" and "Lola" as well as traditional folk music and both old and new protest songs such as "The Battle of Sowerby Bridge", "Shipbuilding" and "Coal Not Dole" which they performed at several benefit concerts during the UK miners' strike (1984–1985). Dave Brady was known for his wild eyes, shaggy beard and aggressive style, often shouting "Sing, yer buggers, sing!" at the audience, so that "the staider confines of the English Folk Dance and Song Society recoiled at the raucousness of it all". The band took its name from Swan Arcade, Bradford, a Victorian shopping arcade which had controversially been demolished.

Their first album Swan Arcade was recorded in 1972 and issued in 1973, but sold poorly despite good reviews. Boyes left and was replaced by Royston Wood from The Young Tradition, a renowned bass-baritone singer and English concertina player. This line up recorded for BBC 'Folk on Two' on January 24 1973 as well as a Peel Session on 13 February 1973, but did not record a studio album.

In August 1973, Wood was replaced by Brian Miller (ex-Laggan and Great Fife Road Show), and the second Peel Session was recorded on 25 March 1974. The line up was then expanded into an electric line-up to include bassist Kevin Hingston, guitarist Jack French and drummer Chris Taylor but Miller left to form a duo with Charlie Sloane, before their final Peel Session on 23 September 1974. The 'electric Swan Arcade' disbanded in early 1975 and in August 1975 reverted to a trio, again with Boyes, and recorded their second album Matchless in 1976. Their music was particularly popular in continental Europe, where they regularly toured, and Matchless stayed in the Belgian Folk Chart for three years. All three band members sang on We are like the Ocean by Barry Melton before Swan Arcade split in 1978.

== Reformation ==
Later in 1978, the Bradys sang on First Light by Richard and Linda Thompson - Richard Thompson had been very vocal about his admiration for Swan Arcade's rendition of his song "The Great Valerio" - and then formed a band called Ragman's Trumpet. They became political activists, campaigning for the Labour Party, and against nuclear power, while running a hotel in Seascale adjacent to the Sellafield nuclear power station. Swan Arcade still played occasional reunion concerts, particularly in Europe, until 1983 when they officially reformed and released Together Forever, again to good reviews and poor sales. They continued to play folk festivals and in 1986 appeared with The Watersons as the Boggle Hole Chorale. In 1987 they played with The Watersons and Martin Carthy as Blue Murder and this "supergroup" appeared at festivals throughout Britain and in Belgium in 1987 and 1988. No studio recordings were made by this line up of Blue Murder, but a live demo was recorded and one live track appears on The Carthy Chronicles (Free Reed FRQCD-60).

Swan Arcade released their sixth and final album Full Circle in 1990, and the band dissolved – for good this time – the following year.

== Subsequent careers ==
The Bradys did not perform at later Blue Murder concerts, although Dave Brady later sang with Mr. McFall's Chamber, an offshoot of the Scottish Chamber Orchestra, for whom he was transport manager. Dave Brady died of emphysema in London on 29 May 2006.

Heather Brady became a Labour Councillor and Mayor of Carlisle, Cumbria.

Boyes later appeared on albums by Lal Waterson and Oliver Knight, Bill Jones, Ashley Hutchings and Bob Davenport. He released his own album Out of the Blue in 1996; and since 1993 has been part of Coope Boyes and Simpson with whom he has also appeared with Blue Murder and Chumbawamba.

Royston Wood died on April 10 1990 from injuries sustained in an accident in New York State.

== Discography ==
- Swan Arcade (1973)
- Matchless (1976)
- Together Forever (1983)
- Diving for Pearls (1987)
- Nothing Blue (1988, cassette only)
- Full Circle (1990)

Compilations

- Round Again (2001) Compilation of Together Forever and Diving for Pearls
