= Blue Murder (folk group) =

UK musical ensemble

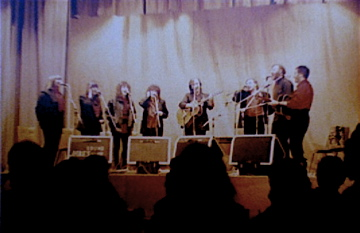
- Blue Murder live at Montgomery Hall, Wath-upon-Dearne, 1987

Background information
- Origin: England
- Genres: English Folk music A cappella Country; Gospel
- Years active: 1987–1988, 1994, 2000–present
- Label: Topic
- Members: Norma Waterson; Jim Boyes; Martin Carthy; Barry Coope; Lester Simpson; Maria Gilhooley
- Past members: Heather Brady; Dave Brady; Lal Waterson; Rachel Waterson; Eliza Carthy; Mike Waterson
- Website: Blue Murder

Blue Murder is an occasional English folk supergroup, consisting at various times of various members of Swan Arcade, Coope Boyes and Simpson, Waterson–Carthy and The Watersons.
