= Lisa Knapp =

British folk musician

Lisa Knapp (born 1974 in Balham) is an English folk singer, songwriter, fiddle player and multi-instrumentalist. Her singing voice has been described as "crystal clear" and reminiscent of Anne Briggs or Jeannie Robertson. Two of her three albums have received five-starred reviews in the British national press.

== Early life ==
Lisa Knapp was born in 1974 in Balham in South London and raised in Tooting, also in South London.

== Albums ==
Her debut album, Wild and Undaunted, released in 2007, was Mojo 's Folk Album of the Year. It includes a cover version of Lal Waterson's song "Black Horse".

Colin Irwin gave her 2013 album Hidden Seam, which included contributions by Martin Carthy and Kathryn Williams, five stars in a review for The Observer. The lyrics of the album's opening track, "Shipping Song", derive from BBC Radio 4's Shipping Forecast. Another song from the album, "Two Ravens", took the award for Best Original Song at the BBC Radio 2 Folk Awards in 2014.

Till April is Dead – A Garland Of May, Knapp's 2017 concept album about the month of May, "twists tradition... mixing in interviews about May Day rituals and samples of birdsong, buzzing flies and cuckoo clocks". It received a five-starred review in The Guardian from Jude Rogers who described it as "overflowing with warmth, light and waywardness". "Knapp’s voice throughout", she said, "is a revelation, both pure and wild, springing free". Writing in The Observer, Neil Spencer gave four stars to Till April is Dead – A Garland for May, which he described as completing "a trio of extraordinary albums". Thomas Blake, for Folk Radio UK, said that the album "seeks to understand old songs and traditions in modern and often highly original ways. It is a real step forward from a genuinely groundbreaking artist".

== Personal life ==
Knapp is married to musician Gerry Diver, who co-produces her albums.

== Discography ==
=== Albums ===
- Wild and Undaunted (2007), Ear to the Ground Music ETTGCD 001
- Hidden Seam (2013), Navigator Records NAVIGATOR 084
- Till April is Dead – A Garland Of May (2017), Ear to the Ground Music ETTGM 003CD
- Hinterland (with Gerry Diver) (2025), Ear to the Ground Music BODQTSR7S6

=== EPs ===
- Hunt the Hare – A Branch Of May (2012), Ear to the Ground Music

== Other musical contributions ==
Knapp sang "The Blacksmith" and "Bonnie at Morn" on Gerry Diver's album, Diversions (2002) and also performed on two of the tracks on David Rotheray's 2013 album Answer Ballads. She also sang "A Promise That I Keep" for the theme song for the Wolfblood series 1–3. In addition, she sings the traditional song "The Rowan Tree" on the soundtrack of the film Living (2022) starring Bill Nighy, used in the final credits. She is also a member of the trio Hack-Poets Guild; their album Blackletter Garland was named one of the ten best folk albums of 2023 by Jude Rogers of The Guardian.
