= Geordie (ballad) =

Ballad

"Geordie" is an English language folk song concerning the trial of the eponymous hero whose lover pleads for his life. It is listed as Child ballad 209 and Number 90 in the Roud Folk Song Index. The ballad was traditionally sung across the English speaking world, particularly in England, Scotland and North America, and was performed with many different melodies and lyrics. In recent times, popular versions have been performed and recorded by numerous artists and groups in different languages, mostly inspired by Joan Baez's recording from her 1962 album Joan Baez in Concert, based on a traditional version from Somerset, England.

== Synopsis ==
There are two distinct and for the most part separate variants of this song, one deriving from 17th-century English broadsides and sung by traditional singers in England, Ireland and North America, the other printed in one 18th and some 19th century ballad collections and collected from Scottish singers and some North American singers.

Steve Roud and Julia Bishop, in the New Penguin Book of English Folk Songs, comment that in Scottish versions Geordie tends to be released, while in English ones his lady "has come too late" and he is executed.

=== Scottish variant ===
A man is killed in battle and Geordie is going to be executed. When his lady hears of this she calls for horses to ride with her household to the court in Edinburgh, sometimes by way of Queensferry, where sometimes she has her horse swim the Firth of Forth. Sometimes she distributes gold to poor people as she goes. Arriving in the town, she sees her husband being brought to the headsman's block. She begs the king for Geordie's life, offering estates and her children in return, but the king orders the hangman to make haste. Sometimes there is discussion about Geordie's fate between lords. Sometimes men of the Gordon clan show readiness to fight. An old man suggests the king accept money for Geordie's release, and a large and sufficient sum is gathered from the crowd. He is released and the couple say complimentary things.

=== English variant ===
A narrator coming (usually) over London Bridge (but sometimes elsewhere) hears a young woman lamenting for Geordie. She says he will be hung in style because he was of royal blood and loved a good woman. She calls for horses to ride to London (or somewhere else). She pleads that Geordie's crimes weren't serious, in that he only stole some of the king's deer and sold them (in Bohenny, Davy, Kilkenny and so on), and says she would give up a variable number of children to save his life. In some versions there is discussion between lawyers. The judge sometimes says that she's too late and always that he cannot pardon Geordie. Sometimes Geordie has time to say goodbye to his friends and his wife. Sometimes one or the other wishes he or she were on "yonder Hill" with weapons to "Fight for the life of Geordie". Often we hear again that his execution will be luxurious.

== History ==
=== Early printed versions ===
==== England ====
A London broadside from between 1601 and 1640 is the earliest version of the ballad, telling the story of the robber George Stoole of Northumberland, who was executed in 1610. The ballad is accompanied by the following text:

'A lamentable new ditty, made upon the death of a worthy gentleman, named George Stoole: dwelling sometime on Gate-side Moore, and sometime at Newcastle in Northumberland: with his penitent end. To a delicate Scottish tune'

It is different in many ways to newer versions of the ballad, but its rhythm and rhyming scheme are familiar, as well some of the text

"I never stole no oxe nor cow

Nor never murdered any

But fifty horse I did receive

Of a merchant's man of Gory."

"For which I am condemnd to dye,

Though guiltlesse I stand dying;

Deare gracious God, my soule receive!

For now my life is flying."

The man of death a part did act

Which grieves mee tell the story;

God comfort all are comfortlesse,

And did[e] so well as Georgie!

After each verse, there is a refrain:

Heigh-ho, heigh-ho, my bonny love,

Heigh-ho, heigh-ho, my bonny!

Heigh-ho, heigh-ho, my owne deare love,

And God be with my Georgie!

Another London broadside entitled "The Life and Death of George of Oxford", printed in 1683, uses the familiar opening lines

As I went over London Bridge all in a misty morning, There did I see one weep and mourn, lamenting for her Georgy,

The English variant was published by many broadside publishers in the nineteenth century.

==== Scotland ====
Robert Burns contributed a Scots version of the Scottish variant to Scots Musical Museum, published in Volume 4 in 1792; This became Child's Version A. The first verses go as follows:

There was a battle in the north,

And nobles there was many,

And they hae killd Sir Charlie Hay,

And they laid the wyte on Geordie.

O he has written a lang letter,

He sent it to his lady:

'Ye maun cum up to Enbrugh town,

To see what word's o Geordie.'

When first she lookd the letter on,

She was baith red and rosy;

But she had na read a word but twa

Till she wallowt like a lily.

'Gar get to me my gude grey steed,

My menyie a' gae wi me,

For I shall neither eat nor drink

Till Enbrugh town shall see me.'

=== Field recordings ===
The earliest recording is a 1907 performance by Joseph Taylor, collected on wax cylinder by the musicologist Percy Grainger in that year. It was digitised by the British Library and made available online in 2018. Louisa "Louie" Hooper (1860–1946) of Langport, Somerset, England (sister of the folk singer Lucy White) sang a version in 1942 which Joan Baez based her popular version on. A version recorded by Keith Summers of the Nottinghamshire singer Alec Bloomfield singing "Young George Oxbury" in the British Library Sound Archive'. The traditional singer Harry Cox sang a complete version to Mervyn Plunkett c.1959 which is available on the Vaughan Williams Memorial Library website. The British folk singer Bob Buckle recorded it in 1975. This is now available on Amazon music.

Alan Lomax recorded Kentucky singer Jean Ritchie singing a version of this song in 1949 in New York.

A version in the "Carroll Mackenzie Collection", "Clare County Library" recorded from Mrs. Casey contains this verse:

My Georgie never killed a man,
No, nor neither robbed a lady.
He stole a pair of the King’s pretty maids,
And he gave them to Lord Taily.

There are three versions, all called "Georgie", in the "Max Hunter Folk Song Collection" at Missouri State University: from Rhonnda Hayes of Irving, Texas; Joan O'Bryant of Wichita, Kansas and Charles Strayer Jr. of Sarcoxie, Missouri; in all these versions, either "the oldest lawyer at the bar" or "Georgie's own lawyer", says that he is condemned by his own confession, an interesting local variant.

=== Folk-song collections ===
The Roud Folk Song Index lists about 129 distinct versions – 40 from England, 27 from Scotland, 2 from Ireland, 52 from the United States and 8 from Canada.

== Popular versions ==
=== Louisa "Louie" Hooper and Joan Baez ===
Joan Baez released one of the first popular versions of the song on her first live album in 1962, which took the tune from the traditional 1942 recording of Louisa "Louie" Hooper (1860–1946) of Langport, Somerset, England. It is possible that the tune came to Baez via Paul Clayton, who recorded a cover of Hooper's version of the song in 1957 on the album British Broadside Ballads in Popular Tradition. Hooper's recording was only a fragment and Clayton sang only what had been performed by Hooper, so Baez used lyrics from elsewhere to complete the song. The version sung by Baez, Clayton and Hooper makes it clear that Geordie's crime was poaching the King's deer, and that he shall be hanged with a "golden chain". The first verse about "London Bridge" was added by Baez but taken from traditional versions. Baez's version appeared to have stabilized the schema of the song in later recordings by other artists.

Sandy Denny, the British folk rock band Trees, Anaïs Mitchell / Jefferson Hamer, and Emilie Autumn all recorded or performed this version of the song, presumably inspired by Joan Baez. A version by Martin Carthy appears on his 1976 album Crown of Horn.

The ballad became popular in Italy thanks to Fabrizio De André who translated the Baez recording into Italian, and this version was later reinterpreted by the folk band Mercanti di Liquore, Angelo Branduardi and the DJ Gabry Ponte.

Danish band Gasolin recorded an adaptation in 1971m heavily inspired by Baez' rendition. "London Bridge" was translated into "Langebro" – the title of the track. The setting shifts from London to 20th-century Copenhagen, although the overall sombre mood of the song remains intact.

The Catalan musicians Roger Mas and Núria Graham performed the song in Catalan as "Jordi" on the album Parnàs (2018).

Famous French singer Claude François recorded a French version in 1965 for his album N°4.

Gabry Ponte released an italo dance version in 2002.

=== Other versions ===
Different versions of the song have also been recorded by famous named such as Shirley Collins, Silly Sisters (Maddie Prior and June Tabor), John Jacob Niles, Doc Watson, and Ewan MacColl.

Julie Felix recorded a version in 1966 which bears a resemblance to Jean Ritchie's traditional recording (1949).

A. L. Lloyd sang a version based on one Cecil Sharp collected from Emma Overd of Langport, Somerset; this version is very similar to the one sung by Louisa "Louie" Hooper, also of Langport, and popularised by Joan Baez.

Being a well-documented song and publicised by English Folk Dance and Song Society, The Broadside Ballads Project, and Mainly Norfolk, the song was recorded by Jon Boden and Oli Steadman for inclusion in their respective lists of daily folk songs "A Folk Song a Day" and "365 Days Of Folk".

Galley Beggar also recorded the song, setting some traditional lyrics to original music.

== Geography ==
In terms of geography, there are four versions. The Scottish variants mention Geordie being rescued from the scaffold in Edinburgh. This may refer to George Gordon, 4th Earl of Huntly. One English version mentions Newcastle. This may refer to George Stools, executed in 1610. There are some versions that mention the town "Boheny", but this has never been satisfactorily located. There is a hamlet called Bohenie near Roybridge. Another English version has the execution taking place in London, and the culprit is the Earl of Oxford. The story of the Earl of Oxford was printed in the 17th-century. The last version is the Danish version taking place in Copenhagen, performed by Gasolin. The Danish title is Langebro.

== Discussion ==
The relationship between the two main variants of this ballad are uncertain.

"The propriety of the inclusion of Georgie in this recorded series of Child ballads is largely dependent upon the acceptance or rejection of various claims of prior existence of several different ballad strains. The ballads in question are a traditional Scottish ballad, the earliest known version dating from the end of the 18th century, and two English broadsides, both of which date from the 17th century. Child (and most later scholars) believed that the Scottish ballad must have existed prior to the broadsides and that the broadside scriveners borrowed from the Scottish ballad. As evidence, Child indicated that the broadsides are merely "goodnights", while the Scottish texts are full narratives, with a beginning, middle and end. Ebsworth, however, was of the opinion that the broadsides were the earlier form, and that the Scottish ballad was an adaption from these.

Most texts collected since Child (including the version sung here by A.L. Lloyd) are obviously derived from 19th century broadside printings of the early English broadsides in question. Indeed, aside from some few texts from Scotland, all of the many recently reported texts are at least partly derived from the English broadsides."

A L Lloyd commented:

"As with many of our best ballads, this one is familiar both in England and in Scotland. In the latter, the main character usually appears as a nobleman sometimes identified as George Gordon, a sixteenth century Earl of Huntly, whereas in England he is usually a common outlaw thought by some to be George Stoole, a Northumbrian robber executed in 1610. In fact, there are not good grounds for presuming that this is a historical ballad at all; it may well be simply a romantic fiction that was already delighting singers and audiences well before the day of the robber Stoole or the dissident Earl of Huntly. Perhaps the story really belongs to the period when the Middle Ages were drawing to a close and the greenwoods were full of outlaws, some high-born, but mostly otherwise, all of them on the run from oppressive feudal authority."

== See also ==
- "The Laird O Logie'" features another woman pleading for her lover's life.
- "The Maid Freed from the Gallows" depicts the condemned pleading for a stay of execution while the ransom may yet arrive.
