= The False Lover Won Back =

Scottish ballad

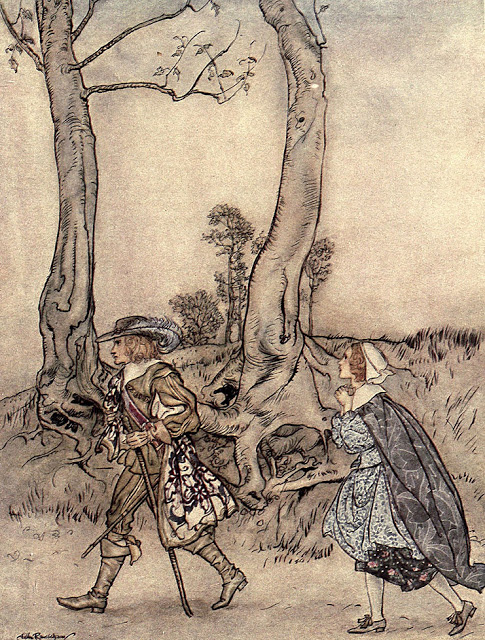
An illustration by Arthur Rackham of "The False Lover Won Back" in Some British Ballads (1919).

"The False Lover Won Back" is a Scottish ballad, cataloged as Child Ballad 218 (Roud 201).

== Origins ==
Francis James Child cataloged the song as Child Ballad 218, recovering two texts representing it. It is also cataloged as Roud 201. The song spread in some form from its origins in Scotland through England as far as the United States, although it is among the lesser-known ballads.

The song has similarities to and may share an origin with other ballads, such as Child Waters. It has sometimes also been called "Young John" or "The Fause Lover."

== Synopsis ==
In the ballad, a woman pursues her lover, who is leaving her for another who is more beautiful. He begs her to forsake him, plying her with gifts, but eventually buys her a wedding gown or a wedding ring and agrees to marry her.

According to Walter Morris Hart, the ballad is somewhat unusual for its depicting a situation in which "it is the maiden who does the wooing."

== Legacy ==
Ewan MacColl and Peggy Seeger performed the song on their 1956 album Classic Scots Ballads. The song was also included as a bonus track on a reissue of Martin Carthy's 1972 album Shearwater.
