= Crown of Horn =

Studio album by Martin Carthy
- Released: 1976
- Recorded: 1976
- Studio: Old Sawmills Studio, Cornwall
- Genre: Folk
- Length: 42:29
- Label: Topic
- Producer: Ashley Hutchings

Martin Carthy chronology
Sweet Wivelsfield (1974)	Crown of Horn (1976)	Because It's There (1979)

Professional ratings
Review scores
Source	Rating
Allmusic	3/5 stars

Crown of Horn is an album by Martin Carthy, released in 1976. It was re-issued by Topic Records on CD in 1995.

The album is remarkable for featuring intricate Moog synthesizer arrangements by Tony Cox on three songs. Tony Cox had previously made a name for himself as a producer and session musician for several progressive rock and folk rock bands, such as Caravan, Camel, Yes and Trees. In 1974 Tony Cox founded the Old Sawmill Studio in which not only Crown of Horn, but also producer Ashley Hutchings' folk dance record "Kickin' Up The Sawdust" and parts of Fairport Convention's Gottle O'Geer album were produced in 1976.

== Track listing ==
All songs are Traditional unless noted otherwise and were arranged by Martin Carthy.

The references after the titles below are from the three major numbering schemes for traditional folk songs, the Roud Folk Song Index, Child Ballad Numbers and the Laws Numbers.

1. "The Bedmaking" (Roud 1631) – 3:16
2. "Locks and Bolts" (Roud 406; Laws M13) – 3:17
3. "King Knapperty" (Roud 32; Child 33) – 3:36
4. "Geordie" (Roud 90; Child 209) – 3:42
5. "Willie's Lady" (Roud 220; Child 6) – 7:23
6. "Virginny" – 2:19
7. "The Worcestershire Wedding" (Roud 1694) – 3:12
8. "Bonny Lass of Anglesey" (Roud 3931; Child 220) – 5:41
9. "William Taylor The Poacher" (Roud 851) – 3:12
10. "Old Tom of Oxford" (instrumental) – 1:47
11. "Palaces of Gold" (Leon Rosselson) – 4:59

== Personnel ==
- Martin Carthy – vocals, acoustic guitar
- Tony Cox – Moog synthesizer (5,8,11)

Technical

- Ashley Hutchings – production
- Jerry Boys – engineer
- Keith Morris – cover photography
