= Coope Boyes and Simpson =

English vocal folk trio

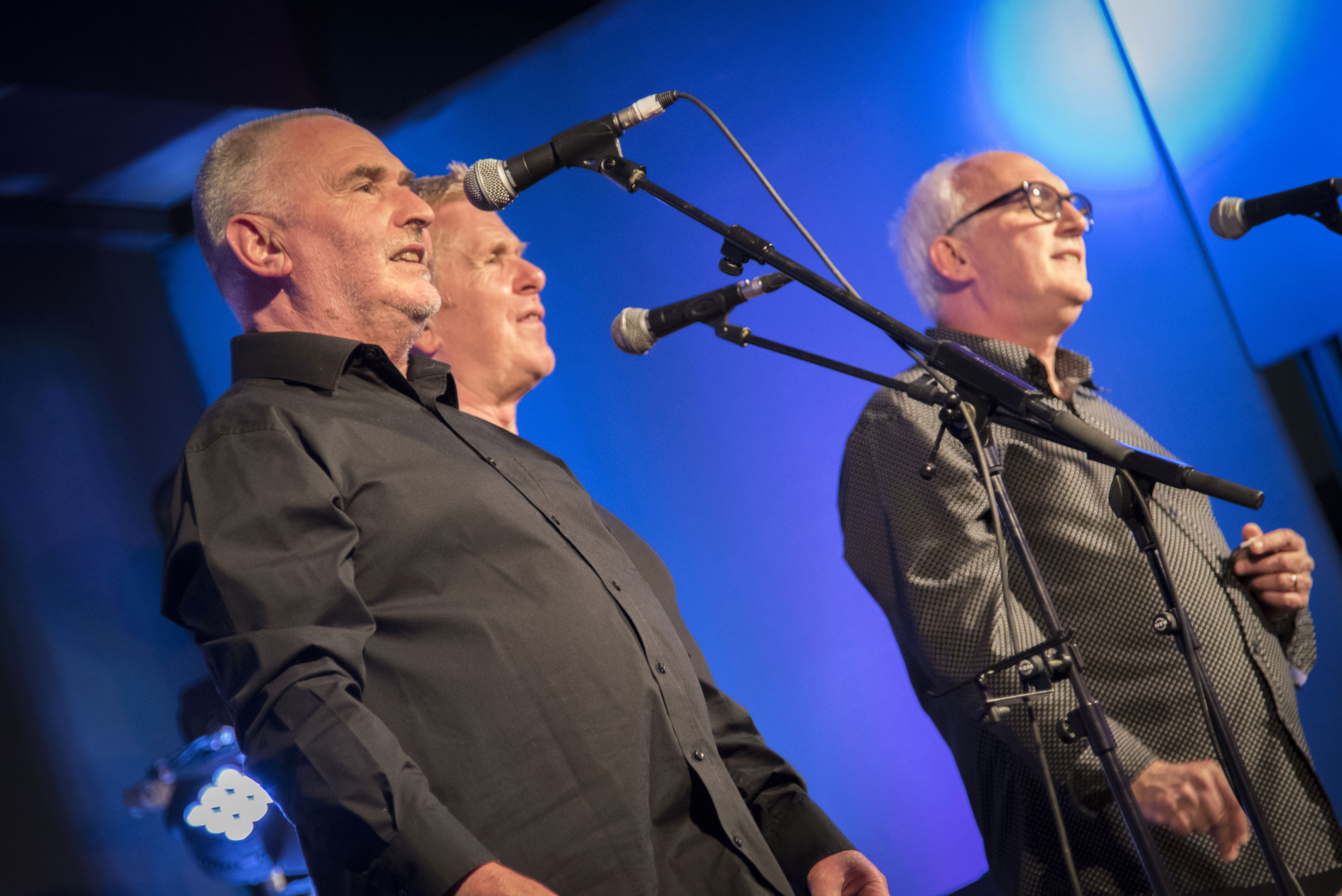
- Coope Boyes and Simpson performing at Costa del Folk, Benalmádena in 2015

Background information
- Genres: A cappella
- Years active: 1990-2017
- Label: No Masters
- Past members: Barry Coope Jim Boyes Lester Simpson

Coope Boyes and Simpson was an English vocal folk trio, formed around 1990. Their sound was rich and often had unusual vocal harmonies.

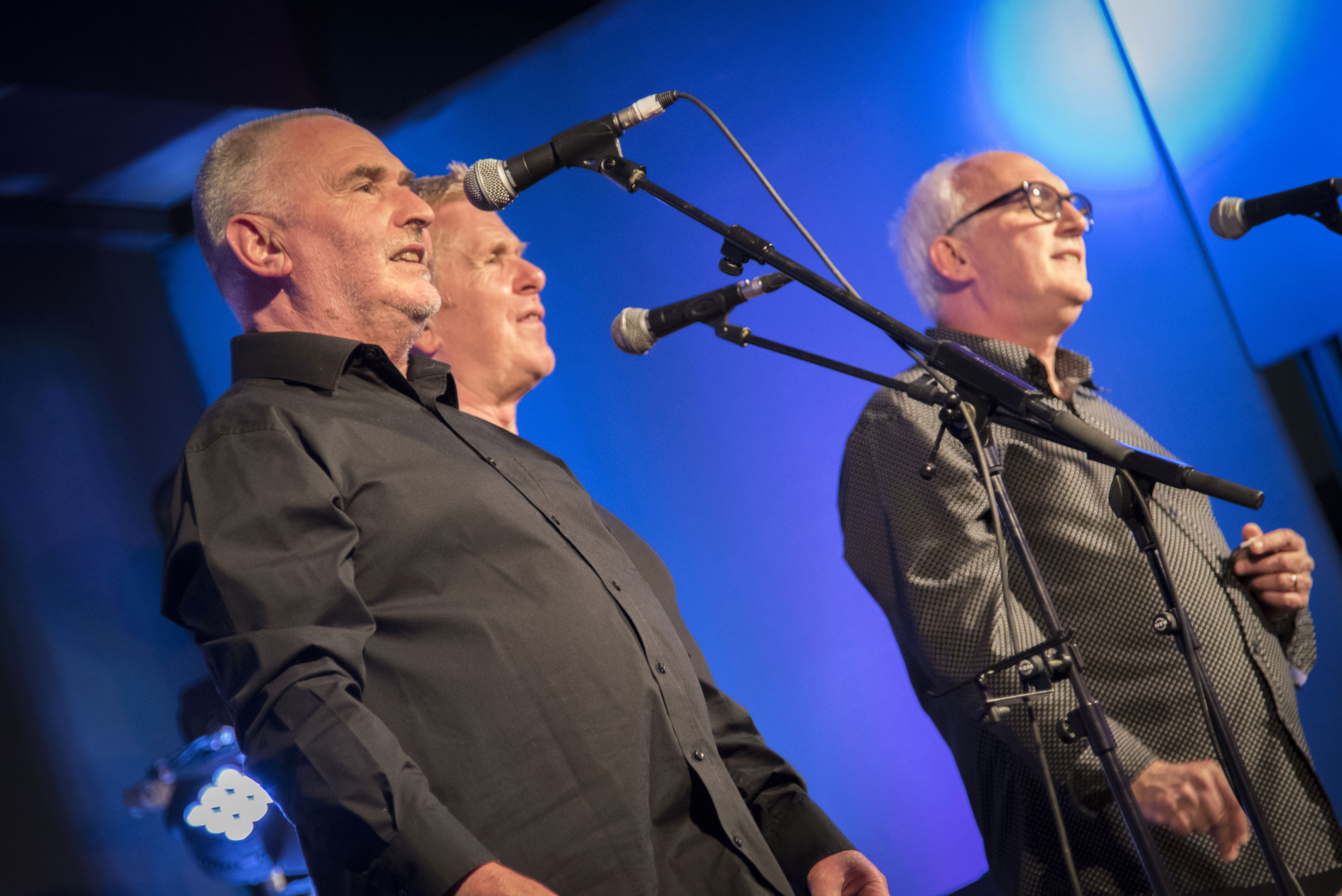
Coope Boyes and Simpson performing at Costa del Folk, Benalmádena in 2015

The group comprised singers Barry Coope, Jim Boyes (formerly of Swan Arcade) and Lester Simpson, and almost all of their music was sung entirely a cappella, although they occasionally used accordion, guitar and drums very sparingly on recordings.

They performed a mixture of both traditional folk songs (though often creatively arranged), hymns and carols, and their own original compositions. Most of their albums have been released on the No Masters label—the No Masters Co-operative is a recording and publishing company run by songwriters, singers and musicians based in the North of England.

Much of their music was political in nature, but they also performed sacred music, and released two albums consisting of Christmas carols and hymns, which receive extensive airplay on Classic FM around Christmas time from DJ Natalie Wheen.

In addition to the three vocalists, the nature of the line up was somewhat fluid, with additional singers joining in as required. Their Christmas recordings are sometimes accredited to 'Voices at the Door', while the trio was also part of the occasional supergroup Blue Murder along with members of Waterson–Carthy and The Watersons. In December 2014 two members of the trio, Coope and Simpson toured with Jo Freya and Fi Fraser with a show of Christmas songs. Together they produced the album "Hark Hark" on No Masters Cooperative Ltd.

In 2014 they issued In Flanders Fields on No Masters, a 2-CD album as "a homage to the music and song of World War I, having been involved with the In Flanders Fields Museum since 1993". The album includes recordings of wartime songs and their own compositions.

They also contributed tracks to 'original' compilation albums—e.g. new recordings to which different artists contribute songs, and frequently work with spoken word and performance artists as part of experimental collaborations.

Since 2005 they frequently collaborated with label mates Chumbawamba, contributing vocals on their albums A Singsong and a Scrap, Get On With It! Live and The Boy Bands Have Won.

In 2016 it was announced that they would be making their final tour in 2017. The trio gave its last performance in October that year, as part of the 2017 Derby Folk Festival.

Barry Coope died after a short illness on 6 November 2021.

== Discography ==
Albums

- Funny Old World (1993)
- We're Here Because We're Here (1995) (with Willem Vermandere and Norbert Detaeye) (live)
- Falling Slowly (1996)
- Passchendaele Suite (1996) (with Panta Rhei)
- Hindsight (1998)
- A Garland of Carols (1998)
- Christmas Truce / Kerstbestand (1999) (with Wak Maar Proper)
- Where You Belong (1999)
- What We Sing Is What We Are (compilation) (1999)
- Twenty-four Seven (2003)
- Fire and Sleet and Candlelight (2003) (with Jo Freya, Fi Fraser and Georgina Boyes)
- Triple Echo (2005)
- Private Peaceful: The Concert (2006) (with Michael Morpurgo) (live)
- Voices at the Door: Midwinter Songs and Carols (2006) (with Jo Freya, Fi Fraser and Georgina Boyes)
- as if... (2010)
- On Angel Wings (with Michael Morpurgo) (2012)
- Hark Hark: (Coope & Simpson with Jo Freya, Fi Fraser) Released: 1 December 2014, No Masters Cooperative Ltd
- In Flanders Fields Released: 4 August 2014, No Masters
- CODA Released: 2016, No Masters

Contributing artist

- The Rough Guide to One Voice: Vocal Music from Around the World (1997, World Music Network)
- The Rough Guide to English Roots Music (1998, World Music Network)
- No One Stands Alone (as part of Blue Murder) 2003 Topic
