= Bright Phoebus =

Studio album by Lal and Mike Waterson
- Released: September 1972
- Recorded: May 1972
- Genre: Folk music, singer-songwriter
- Length: 36:39
- Label: Trailer Records
- Producer: Bill Leader

The Watersons chronology
A Yorkshire Garland (1966)	Bright Phoebus (1972)	For Pence and Spicy Ale (1975)

Bright Phoebus, fully titled Bright Phoebus: Songs by Lal & Mike Waterson, is a folk rock album by Lal and Mike Waterson. It was recorded in May 1972 with musical assistance from various well-known members of the British folk rock scene. The album failed to make an impact on its original release, but it was subsequently championed by many musicians, including Billy Bragg, Arcade Fire, Richard Hawley and Jarvis Cocker. For years the album was difficult to obtain. In 2017, a re-release of Bright Phoebus was announced and shortly thereafter pulled from the market for legal reasons.

== Preface ==
Between 1965 and 1968 The Watersons, a four-piece family vocal group from Yorkshire, had made a name for themselves as an influential force in the British folk revival, singing old traditional folk songs and releasing their debut album Frost and Fire: A Calendar of Ritual and Magical Songs in 1965 to good critical acclaim. The album was produced by Tony Engle and was named "Melody Maker Album of the Year". As several years of folk club touring took a toll on the musicians, the group members decided to take up regular jobs in 1968. Mike Waterson subsequently worked as a painter, Norma Waterson as a disc jockey on the Caribbean British Overseas Territory island of Montserrat, while Lal Waterson became a mother of two children and lived "with her extended family in a folk commune on the Yorkshire Moors".

The realisation of Bright Phoebus was propelled by Martin Carthy's fondness of Lal Waterson's songs, which he happened to overhear in 1971 in the early stages of his relationship with Lal Waterson's sister Norma. (Notably, Martin Carthy and Norma Waterson, who perform "Red Wine & Promises" together on the finished album, became engaged to one another during the recording sessions.) Consequently, Lal Waterson demoed a couple of her songs the very same year. Mike Waterson too contributed some of his songs to these preliminary sessions. Of this repertoire, versions of Lal's "Never the Same", "To Make You Stay" and "Red Wine and Promises", Mike's "Shady Lady" and their collaboration "The Scarecrow" survived as demo recordings. Most of them are performed solo by Lal Waterson on vocals and acoustic guitar, with occasional vocal harmonies or guitar parts by Mike Waterson. These recordings, plus other previously unissued songs of Lal's, were released on the CD/book combination Teach Me to Be a Summer's Morning in 2013 which illustrates both Lal Waterson's graphic, lyrical and musical art.

The 1998 Lal Waterson obituary in The Daily Telegraph claims that Lal Waterson's Bright Phoebus songs had previously been conceived as poems which were only set to music later. Both Mike and Lal Waterson's songs seem to have arisen from everyday life; for instance, allegedly, the song "Bright Phoebus" occurred to Mike Waterson while standing on his ladder painting.

== Recording ==
The definitive album sessions took place in May 1972, once again under the direction of producer and folk Bill Leader. The recording process took one week and was characterised by guitarist Martin Carthy as "loose and very anarchic, but with an iron discipline running through the whole thing". For instance, a postman – who might be Graham Gordon, who is credited in the liner notes – happened to deliver a package during the recording of "Magical Man" and was invited to join in with the chorus.

== Material and reception ==
Professional ratings
Aggregate scores
Source	Rating
Metacritic	90/100 (reissue)
Review scores
Source	Rating
AllMusic	5/5 stars
Clash	10/10
Exclaim!	9/10
The Guardian	5/5 stars
The Line of Best Fit	8.5/10
Louder Than War	9/10
Pitchfork	8.5/10
PopMatters	9/10
Record Collector	5/5 stars
Uncut	9/10

Seven of twelve songs are accompanied by acoustic guitars and occasional embellishments on cello, oboe and bass guitar; most of these songs feature intricate dual acoustic guitar arrangements by ex-Fairport Convention guitarist Richard Thompson and ex-Steeleye Span guitarist Martin Carthy. The remaining five songs are carried by the rhythm section of Ashley Hutchings' Morris On band, consisting of Ashley Hutchings on electric bass guitar, Richard Thompson on electric guitar and Dave Mattacks on drums.

Critical reception of Bright Phoebus at that time was sparse and often negative. Technical and financial issues on the side of the record label resulted in a small edition of only 1000 functioning LP copies. Reactions by the folk scene ranged from astonishment to relative dismissal (for instance by Ewan MacColl), especially given that the Waterson family was known for 'authentic' delivery of traditional folk songs rather than for contemporary, sometimes pop-inspired songwriting. Positive response came from fellow folk revival musicians such as Anne Briggs and June Tabor.

In the 1998 Guardian obituary of Lal Waterson Colin Irwin analyses that at the time of release "Lal's complex, brooding tales particularly confused the diehards." He characterises her songs as "exceptionally durable" and highlights "The Scarecrow" as a stand-out track, comparing the imagery of this song with the works of Swedish film director Ingmar Bergman. Other authors describe "The Scarecrow" as "an achingly haunting ballad," with implications of child sacrifice, and a song "laced with pagan horror.“ In his September 1998 The Independent obituary for Lal Waterson Karl Dallas too stresses the remarkability of "The Scarecrow"; additionally, he notices the "devastating picture of industrial poverty in "Never the Same" as well as the "drunken reminiscence of 'Red Wine and Promises.'"

In his 2011 book Electric Eden, Rob Young describes Bright Phoebus as "a curious response to the new directions in folk-rock that were taking place at the time." Young compares the album's alternating "shades and sunny intervals" with the unpredictability of English weather – a balancing act resolved by the "triumphant sun" of the title track, which refers to phoebus - a different name of the ancient Greek solar god Apollo. On the musical side he finds elements of chamber music ("The Scarecrow," "Winifer Odd"), musique concrète ("Rubber Band") and country rock ("The Magical Man") in the songs on the album.

The AllMusic review by James Christopher Monger commends the accompanying ensemble for its song-serving and of-a-piece playing; he describes the title track as "a pagan campfire singalong that manages to both intrigue and inspire while simultaneously ripping your heart out for no apparent reason," a sentiment which according to Monger applies to the whole album.

== Release history ==
Apart from a very basic, limited CD reissue in 1985 and CD-R reissue of dubious legal status (the legal status of this release was upheld as being genuine and legal following the 2017 Court Case) in 2000, the album had never received a proper re-release despite considerable interest of both the Watersons and folk music listeners to see the album reissued. Reasons for this included copyright issues and unavailability of the master tapes.

The original Trailer Records LP is a much sought-after rarity which is sold at high prices.

Four of the original twelve Bright Phoebus recordings appear on the following three compilation CDs: "Magical Man" on the 1996 Castle Music triple CD New Electric Muse: The Story of Folk into Rock; "Never the Same" and "To Make You Stay" on the 2005 Honest Jon's CD Never The Same – Leave-Taking from the British Folk Revival 1970–1977; and "Rubber Band" on the 2006 Castle Music double CD The Fairport Companion – Loose Chippings from the Fairport Convention Family Tree.

In 2002, various folk musicians re-interpreted the Bright Phoebus songs, plus other material from Lal and Mike Waterson's catalogue, and released these recordings on Topic Records as Shining Bright – The Songs of Lal & Mike Waterson.

=== 2017 re-release ===
A re-release of Bright Phoebus was announced in May 2017 with a complete set of remasters by David Suff and Marry Waterson, and sleeve notes by Pete Paphides. The album was re-released in a variety of packages by Domino Records on 4 August. The double CD version of Bright Phoebus comprises one disc of the re-mastered original album, and one disc of hitherto unreleased demos for the album. In August 2017, the re-release of Bright Phoebus entered the UK Official Albums charts at number 21.

The "lovingly remastered" Domino release attracted uniformly positive reviews.

=== 2017 re-release court case ===
The Domino Recording Company was found to be guilty of copyright infringement in relation to the 2017 re-issue of Bright Phoebus and Celtic Music's claims to the rights in the album were upheld by the UK High Court, based on the fact that they purchased the Leader and Trailer labels in 1990.

By 2024 the album had arrived on popular streaming sites Spotify and Tidal. It is unclear whether the family will receive any income from this source.

== Track listing ==
Credits are specified in 2–3 rows for better overview: vocalists – rhythm section – additional instruments (where applicable). Composing credits appear in small font.

Side A:

1. Rubber Band (2:57), Mike Waterson
  - Mike Waterson – lead and chorus vocals; Lal Waterson, Norma Waterson, Tim Hart, Maddy Prior – chorus vocals
  - Richard Thompson – rhythm guitar; Ashley Hutchings – bass guitar; Dave Mattacks – drums; Tim Hart – tambourine
  - Sammy Rimmington – clarinet; Dennis Field – cornet; Keith Nicholls – trombone; Richard Gold – rubber band; Bill Leader – jew's harp
2. The Scarecrow (3:49), Lal & Mike Waterson
  - Mike Waterson – vocals
  - Richard Thompson – acoustic guitar (left channel); Martin Carthy – acoustic guitar (right channel)
3. Fine Horseman (3:31), Lal Waterson
  - Lal Waterson – vocals
  - Richard Thompson – acoustic guitar (left channel); Martin Carthy – acoustic guitar (right channel)
  - Sue Harris – oboe; Clare Deniz – cello
4. Winifer Odd (2:43), Lal Waterson
  - Lal Waterson – vocals
  - Richard Thompson – acoustic guitar (left channel); Martin Carthy – acoustic guitar (right channel)
5. Danny Rose (2:42), Mike Waterson
  - Mike Waterson – vocals
  - Richard Thompson – lead guitar; Martin Carthy – acoustic guitar; Ashley Hutchings – bass guitar; Dave Mattacks – drums
6. Child Among the Weeds (3:40), Lal Waterson, Chris Collins
  - Lal Waterson – vocals; Bob Davenport – vocals (bridge)
  - Richard Thompson – acoustic guitar (left channel); Martin Carthy – acoustic guitar (right channel)

Side B:

1. Magical Man (2:47), Lal & Mike Waterson, Chris Collins
  - Mike Waterson – lead and chorus vocals; Lal Waterson, Norma Waterson, Tim Hart, Maddy Prior, Martin Carthy, Bernie Vickers (briefly a member of the Watersons in early 1972, prior to Bright Phoebus), Graham Gordon – chorus vocals
  - Richard Thompson – lead guitar; Martin Carthy – acoustic guitar; Ashley Hutchings – bass guitar; Dave Mattacks – drums
2. Never the Same (2:55), Lal Waterson
  - Lal Waterson – vocals
  - Richard Thompson – acoustic guitar (left channel); Martin Carthy – acoustic guitar (right channel)
  - Clare Deniz – cello
3. To Make You Stay (2:12), Lal Waterson
  - Lal Waterson – vocals
  - Richard Thompson – acoustic guitar (left channel); Martin Carthy – acoustic guitar (right channel); Ashley Hutchings – bass guitar
4. Shady Lady (3:18), Mike Waterson
  - Mike Waterson, Lal Waterson, Norma Waterson, Tim Hart, Maddy Prior, Martin Carthy – chorus vocals
  - Richard Thompson – lead guitar; Martin Carthy – acoustic guitar; Ashley Hutchings – bass guitar; Dave Mattacks – drums
5. Red Wine & Promises (3:04), Lal Waterson
  - Norma Waterson – vocals
  - Martin Carthy – acoustic guitar
6. Bright Phoebus (2:54), Mike Waterson
  - Mike Waterson – lead and chorus vocals; Lal Waterson – lead and chorus vocals; Norma Waterson, Tim Hart, Maddy Prior, Martin Carthy – chorus vocals
  - Richard Thompson – lead guitar; Mike Waterson – acoustic guitar; Martin Carthy – acoustic guitar; Ashley Hutchings – bass guitar; Dave Mattacks – drums

== Promotion ==
"Rubber Band" was released as a single on Transatlantic Records with "Red Wine and Promises" on the B-side.

In his September 1998 The Independent obituary for Lal Waterson Karl Dallas claims that a Top of the Pops performance of "Rubber Band" was in discussion, but ultimately called off.

== Interpretations by other artists (selection) ==
Rubber Band: performed live by Fairport Convention during their 1979 tour (first released in 1980 as a single with "The Bonny Black Hare" on the B-side)

The Scarecrow: June Tabor on Abyssinians, 1983; Dick Gaughan on Shining Bright: The Songs of Lal & Mike Waterson, 2002

Fine Horseman: Anne Briggs on The Time Has Come, 1971; Promise and the Monster, Swedish folk group, on Feed the Fire, 2016

Danny Rose: Billy Bragg & The Blokes on Shining Bright: The Songs of Lal & Mike Waterson, 2002

Bright Phoebus: Emily Barker & the Red Clay Halo on Despite The Snow, 2008

To Make You Stay: Offa Rex on The Queen of Hearts, 2017

Child Among the Weeds: Lady Maisery on Tender, 2022

Red Wine & Promises has been covered by Tony Capstick, June Tabor, Grace Notes, Richard Thompson, Victoria Williams and The Unthanks.
