= Sweet Wivelsfield =

Studio album by Martin Carthy
- Released: 1974
- Recorded: 1974
- Studio: Sound Techniques, London
- Genre: Folk
- Length: 42:09
- Label: Topic
- Producer: Ashley Hutchings

Martin Carthy chronology
Shearwater (1972)	Sweet Wivelsfield (1974)	Crown of Horn (1976)

Professional ratings
Review scores
Source	Rating
Allmusic	3/5 stars

Sweet Wivelsfield is an album by Martin Carthy, released in 1974. It was re-issued by Topic Records on LP in 1981 and on CD in 1996.

It is the first of a trilogy of Martin Carthy albums which were produced by Fairport Convention founder and former Steeleye Span bandmate Ashley Hutchings. Both had played on an electric version of the song "Skewbald" on Steeleye Span's 1971 album Ten Man Mop, or Mr. Reservoir Butler Rides Again.

== Track listing ==
All songs are Traditional and were arranged by Martin Carthy

1. "Shepherd O Shepherd" – 3:23
2. "Billy Boy" – 2:52
3. "Three Jolly Sneaksmen" – 4:15
4. "Trimdon Grange" – 6:25
5. "All of a Row" – 2:38
6. "Skewbald" – 3:39
7. "Mary Neal" – 3:59
8. "King Henry" – 6:21
9. "John Barleycorn" – 2:21
10. "The Cottage in the Wood" – 6:13

== Personnel ==
- Martin Carthy – vocals, acoustic guitar (1-6,8,10)

Technical

- Ashley Hutchings – production
- Jerry Boys - engineer
- Keith Morris - photography
- Keith Davis - cover illustration
