= The Famous Flower of Serving-Men =

Traditional song

The Famous Flower of Serving-Men or The Lady Turned Serving-Man (Child 106, Roud 199) is a traditional English language folk song and murder ballad. Child considered it as closely related to the ballad "The Lament of the Border Widow" or "The Border Widow's Lament".

"Unusually, it is possible to give a precise date and authorship to this ballad. It was written by the prolific balladeer, Laurence Price, and published in July 1656, under the title of The famous Flower of Serving-Men. Or, The Lady turn'd Serving-Man. It lasted in the mouths of ordinary people for three hundred years: what a tribute to the work of any writer, leave alone the obscure Laurence Price. Oral tradition, however, has made changes. The original has twenty-eight verses and a fairy-tale ending: "And then for fear of further strife, / he took Sweet William to be his Wife: / The like before was never seen, / A Serving-man to be a Queen". – Roy Palmer, A Book of British Ballads

== Synopsis ==
A woman's husband and child are killed by agents of her mother (or, sometimes, stepmother). The woman buries them, disguises herself as a man, and goes to the king's court to become his servant. She serves him well enough to become his chamberlain.

In most variants, the king goes hunting and follows a mysterious white hind through the forest to a clearing. The spirit of the woman's dead husband appears as a bird and laments his love's misfortune. The king returns and kisses his chamberlain, still dressed as a man, to the shock of the assembled court. The king then generally marries the woman and has her mother/stepmother executed.

In some versions the bird does not appear; instead the king overhears the woman herself lamenting her fate.

In The Border Widow's Lament, a woman laments, in very similar verses, the murder of her husband by the king; she buries him and declares she will never love another. Joseph Haydn arranged a version of this song in the 1790s, (Hob. XXXIa:232).

== Field recordings ==
- Martha Reid, of Blairgowrie, Perthshire, Scotland, was recorded by Maurice Fleming in 1955.
- Caroline Hughes of Blandford, Dorset sang the song to Peter Kennedy in 1968.
- Mary Delaney sang a variant entitled My Brother Built for Me a Bancy Bower to Jim Carroll and Pat Mackenzie in Co. Tipperary somewhere between 1973 and 1985.

== Martin Carthy ==
Martin Carthy's version is the most notable recording. For his 1972 album Shearwater, he took the fragments and reworked the ballad, drawing on lines from other ballads. He set the piece to a tune used by Hedy West for the "Maid of Colchester." The song was featured twice on the BBC Radio 1 John Peel show – first on 6 August 1973 and again on 22 April 1975. In 2005 Carthy won the award for Best Traditional Track for "Famous Flower of Serving Men" at the BBC Radio 2 Folk Awards.

Below are the first few verses of Laurence Price's 1656 lyrics, with Martin Carthy's adapted lyrics at right:

My mother show'd me a deadly spight;
She sent three thieves at darksome night;
They put my servants all to flight,
They rob'd my bower, and they slew my knight.

They could not do me much more harm,
But they slew my baby on my arm;
They left me nothing to wrap it in
But the bloody, bloody sheet that it lay in.

They left me nothing to make a grave
But the bloody sword that slew my babe;
All alone the grave I made,
And all alone salt tears I shed.

All alone the bell I rung,
And all alone sweet psalms I sung;
I leant my head against a block,
And there I cut my lovely locks.

I cut my locks, and chang'd my name
From Fair Eleanore to Sweet William.
Went to court to serve my king
As the famous flower of serving men.

My mother did me deadly spite,
For she sent thieves in the dark of night.
Put my servants all to flight,
They robbed my bower, they slew my knight.

They couldn't do to me no harm,
So they slew my baby in my arm;
Left me naught to wrap him in
But the bloody sheet that he lay in.

They left me naught to dig his grave,
But the bloody sword that slew my babe;
All alone the grave I made,
And all alone the tears I shed.

And all alone the bell I rang,
And all alone the psalm I sang.
I leaned my head all against a block
And there I cut my lovely locks.

I cut my locks and I changed my name
From Fair Eleanor to Sweet William,
Went to court to serve my king
As the famous flower of serving men.
