= Landfall (Martin Carthy album) =

Album by Martin Carthy

Studio album by Martin Carthy
- Released: 1971
- Recorded: 1971
- Genre: Folk
- Length: 57:43
- Label: Philips
- Producer: Terry Brown

Martin Carthy chronology
Prince Heathen (1969)	Landfall (1971)	Shearwater (1972)

Professional ratings
Review scores
Source	Rating
Allmusic	4/5 stars

Landfall is an album by Martin Carthy, released in 1971.

Carthy made this album in the year he left Steeleye Span. The song "Cold Haily Windy Night" is a re-recording of the same song on Steeleye's album Please to See the King. In contrast to the richly resonating sound on that album, here everything is stripped down without any reverb. Later he would record it again with The Imagined Village, returning to a complex rhythm once more. Steeleye Span made some attempt to convey regional accent. Here every song is sung with the southern English accent that is natural to him. "The Cruel Mother" is sung without accompaniment.

The Polygram Records subsidiary Gama Records Ltd licensed the album to Topic Records who issued it in 1977.

The original issue on Philips had "Landfall" as one word. The cover of the reissue on Topic Records had "Land" followed by "Martin Carthy" on the next line, followed by "Fall" on the next line, almost implying that "Land Fall" is two words. The spine had the title as a single word and all discographies treat it as one word. Dave Goulder's song "January Man" is his best known song. Martin Carthy played on Goulder's album Requiem For Steam in 1971.

Landfall was re-issued by Topic on CD in 1996.

== Track listing ==
All songs Traditional unless otherwise noted.

1. "Here's Adieu To All Judges and Juries" – 2:54
2. "Brown Adam" – 6:24
3. "O'er the Hills" (Roud 8460) – 5:51
4. "Cruel Mother" (Roud 9, Child 20) – 6:10
5. "Cold Haily Windy Night" – 4:30
6. "His Name is Andrew" (David Ackles) – 5:19
7. "The Bold Poachers" – 4:59
8. "Dust to Dust" (John Kirkpatrick) – 3:46
9. "The Broomfield Hill" – 4:40
10. "January Man" (Dave Goulder) – 3:15

== Personnel ==
- Martin Carthy – vocals, guitar

Technical

- David Voyde - recording engineer
- Tony Russell - sleeve
