= Out of the Cut =

Studio album by Martin Carthy
- Released: 1982
- Recorded: 1982
- Studio: Gateway Studios, London
- Genre: Folk
- Length: 44:30
- Label: Topic
- Producer: Martin Carthy, Jerry Boys

Martin Carthy chronology
Because It's There (1979)	Out of the Cut (1982)	Right of Passage (1988)

Professional ratings
Review scores
Source	Rating
Allmusic	5/5 stars

Out of the Cut is an album by Martin Carthy, released in 1982. It was re-issued by Topic Records on CD in 1994.

== Track listing ==
All songs are traditional and were arranged by Martin Carthy. The Roud number refers to the Roud index of folk songs number and the Child number is from the Child Ballad numbering.

1. "The Devil and the Feathery Wife" (Roud 12551) – 5:01
2. "Reynard the Fox" (Roud 1868) – 4:32
3. "The Song of the Lower Classes" (Ernest Charles Jones) – 4:48
4. "Rufford Park Poachers" (Roud 1759) – 5:08
5. "Molly Oxford" (Instrumental) – 2:22
6. "Rigs of the Time" (Roud 876) – 2:56
7. "I Sowed Some Seeds" (Roud 914) – 3:10
8. "The Friar in the Well" (Roud 116; Child 276) – 3:49
9. "Jack Rowland" – 8:46
10. "Old Horse" (Child 513) – 3:53

== Personnel ==
- Martin Carthy – vocals, acoustic guitar (1,2,4-7,9), mandolin (8,10), co-production
- John Kirkpatrick – accordion (1), concertina (7,8,10)
- Howard Evans – trumpet (7,8), flugelhorn (10)
- Richard Thompson – electric guitar (10)

Technical

- Jerry Boys – co-production, engineering
- Keith Morris – cover photography
