= Shearwater (album) =

Studio album by Martin Carthy
- Released: 1972
- Recorded: 1972
- Genre: Folk
- Label: Pegasus, Mooncrest, Castle Music
- Producer: Terry Brown

Martin Carthy chronology
| Landfall (1971) | Shearwater (1972) | Sweet Wivelsfield (1974) |

Professional ratings
Review scores
| Source | Rating |
|---|---|
| Allmusic | 4.5/5 stars |

Shearwater is an album by Martin Carthy, released in 1972 on the Pegasus label as PEG12. It was re-released on vinyl in 1973/74 by Mooncrest as CREST25. The album was re-issued on CD in 1995, by Mooncrest, as CRESTCD 008 and then again, in March 2005 by Castle Music, as CMQCD1096.

== Track listing ==
All songs Traditional; arranged by Martin Carthy

1. "I Was a Young Man" (Roud 1572) – 2:46
2. "Banks of Green Willow" (Roud 172; Child 24) – 4:31
3. "Handsome Polly-O" (Roud 545) – 2:31
4. "Outlandish Knight" (Roud 21; Child 4) – 5:25
5. "He Called for a Candle" (Roud 269, Laws K43)– 2:49
6. "John Blunt" (Roud 115; Child 275) – 3:25
7. "Lord Randall" (Roud 10; Child 12) – 4:34
8. "William Taylor" (Roud 158; Laws N11) – 3:42
9. "Famous Flower of Serving Men" (Roud 199; Child 106) – 9:23
10. "Betsy Bell and Mary Gray" (Roud 237; Child 201) – 1:33

== Additional tracks on the 2005 Castle CD ==
The Castle CD reissue has three bonus tracks from the BBC Radio 1 John Peel session recorded on 22 May 1972 at the Playhouse Theatre, Northumberland Avenue, London, broadcast on 30 May 1972:

1. "The False Lover Won Back" (Roud 201; Child 218) - 4.12
2. "King Henry" (Roud 3867; Child 32) - 5.42
3. "Trimdon Grange" (Roud 3189) - 4.06

== Personnel ==
- Martin Carthy – vocals, guitar, dulcimer
- Maddy Prior – vocals on "Betsy Bell and Mary Gray"
- uncredited – drone on "William Taylor"

Technical

- Terry Brown - producer (for September Productions Ltd)
- Jerry Boys - engineer
- David Berney Wade - art direction, design
