= The Jolly Waggoner =

Traditional song

The Jolly Waggoner (Roud # 1088) is an English folk-song.

== Synopsis ==
A waggoner looks back on his life. His parents had disapproved of his choice of profession, but has no regrets. He can be cold and wet, but he simply stops at the next inn and sits with the landlord, drinking. In the summer he hears the birds sing. In the autumn he has lots of work and the money rolls in.

== Lyrics ==
There are many different versions of the song. These lyrics are those provided by Robert Bell in his 1857 Ancient Poems, Ballads and Songs of the Peasantry of England:

When first I went a-waggoning, a-waggoning did go,
I filled my parents’ hearts full of sorrow, grief, and woe.
And many are the hardships that I have since gone through.

And sing wo, my lads, sing wo!
Drive on my lads, I-ho!
And who wouldn’t lead the life of a jolly waggoner?

It is a cold and stormy night, and I’m wet to the skin,
I will bear it with contentment till I get unto the inn.
And then I’ll get a drinking with the landlord and his kin.
And sing, &c.

Now summer it is coming,—what pleasure we shall see;
The small birds are a-singing on every green tree,
The blackbirds and the thrushes are a-whistling merrilie.
And sing, &c.

Now Michaelmas is coming,—what pleasure we shall find;
It will make the gold to fly, my boys, like chaff before the wind;
And every lad shall take his lass, so loving and so kind.
And sing, &c.

== Collected examples ==
The distribution of the song appears to be confined to Southern England, though an early broadsheet version comes from Dublin.

Robert Bell claimed The song dated back to at least the 1750s, and observed that it was especially popular in South West England. He suggested that it related to "the days of transition, when the waggon displaced the packhorse."

Ralph Vaughan Williams collected it from Edward Rose, landlord of the Bridge public house at Acle, Norfolk on Tuesday 14 April 1908.

Alfred Williams collected it from David Sawyer of Ogbourne, Wiltshire.

Sabine Baring-Gould and Cecil Sharp also collected it.

=== Standard references ===
- Roud 1088

==== Broadsides ====
J. F. Nugent and Co (Dublin) (1860–1899)

==== Other printed versions ====
- Ancient Poems, Ballads and Songs of the Peasantry of England ed by Robert Bell (1857)
- Frank Kidson found it in Yorkshire
- "A Garland of Country Songs" by S Baring Gould and H Fleetwood Shepherd (probably collected between 1888 and 1917)

(Sabing Baring-Gould noted it from James Oliver of Launceton)

- Alfred Williams "Folk songs of the Upper Thames" song dated c 1914-16
- "Twice 44 Sociable Songs" by Geoffrey Shaw (1928)
- "The Oxford Song Book" vol 2 (1963)
- Everyman's Book of English Country Songs ed by Roy Palmer. (1979)

=== Recordings ===
Album/Single	Performer	Year	Variant	Notes
"Travelling For a Living"	The Watersons	1965	"The Jolly Waggoners"	Live version. Broadcast on TV in 1966. Issued as a DVD ("Mighty River of Song") in 2004.
"The Watersons"	The Watersons	1966	.	.
"A Shropshire Lad"	Fred Jordan	1952	"Jolly Waggoner"	.
"Lark in the Morning"	The Freemen	1971	.	.
"Dorset Style"	The Yetties	1978	.	.
"A World Without Horses"	Walter Pardon	1970s	.	.
"Johnny's Private Army"	Johnny Collins	1975	.	.
"By Numbers"	Woodbine Lizzie	1979	.	.
"Pint Pot and Plough"	Mike Ballantyne	1992	.	Canadian singer [Now on CD; see: www.mikeballantyne.ca]
"Brian Kelly In Memoriam"	Brian Kelly	c 2001	.	.
"Fields to the Stones"	The Spain Brothers	c 2003	.	.
"By Chance It Was"	Mike Bosworth with John Kirkpatrick	2004	.	.
"The Makem and Spain Brothers"	The Makem and Spain Brothers	2005	.	.

There are some pubs called "Jolly Waggoner", for example

- - Ardley, Hertfordshire
- - Hounslow, Middlesex
