= Brass Monkey (band) =

- Origin: England
- Genres: English Folk music
- Years active: 1982–1987, 1998–present
- Label: Topic
- Members: John Kirkpatrick; Martin Carthy; Roger Williams; Martin Brinsford; Paul Archibald; Shane Brennan
- Past members: Howard Evans; Richard Cheetham

Brass Monkey are an English folk band from the 1980s, who reunited in the late 1990s. They were innovative in their use of a brass section which was atypical for English folk music.

The band originally consisted of Martin Carthy (vocals, guitar, mandolin), John Kirkpatrick (vocals, accordion, concertina), Howard Evans (trumpet), Roger Williams (trombone), Martin Brinsford (harmonica, percussion, saxophone).

Carthy was a well established musician at their formation, having been a member of Steeleye Span and The Watersons, as well as leading a successful solo career. Kirkpatrick had also played with Steeleye Span for a time, and worked with Carthy in the Albion Country Band. The two formed an occasional trio with Evans after all three appeared on Carthy's albums Because It's There (1979) and Out of the Cut (1982). Brass Monkey was formed with the addition of Williams and Brinsford after initially being billed as The Martin Carthy Band.

In 1984, after recording their first album, Williams was replaced by Richard Cheetham (born 29 January 1957, in Ashton-under-Lyne, Lancashire). The band recorded the two albums Brass Monkey (1983) and See How it Runs (1986). Both primarily consisted of traditional songs and tunes and were later re-issued on a single CD under the title The Complete Brass Monkey (1993). They also guested on Loudon Wainwright III's 1986 album More Love Songs. Unable to reconcile the schedules of its various members, the band reluctantly broke up in 1987.

In 1997, the group reunited for a tour, and soon recorded a third album, Sound and Rumour. This was followed by Going and Staying in 2001 on which both Williams and Cheetham appeared and Flame of Fire in 2004, which reverted to the original line-up.

Despite Evans' death, in 2006 the band decided to continue, initially with a four-piece line-up who debuted with a short set at a Watersons family show at the Royal Albert Hall on 12 May 2007 before a short UK tour later in the same year and sporadic live shows during 2008. Later in 2008, the band recruited Paul Archibald as their new trumpet player and debuted their new lineup at the Electric Theatre in Guildford on 15 March 2009. This line-up released a new CD Head of Steam on 20 April 2009.

== Discography ==
All released on Topic Records unless otherwise noted.

- Brass Monkey (1983)
- See How It Runs (1986)
- The Complete Brass Monkey (1993) (compilation of the first two albums)
- Sound and Rumour (1999)
- Going and Staying (2001)
- Flame of Fire (2004)
- The Definitive Collection (2005, Highpoint) (compilation)
- Head of Steam (2009)
- Brass Monkey The Best of Live – 30th Anniversary Celebration (2013, Park)
