= Norma Waterson =

English folk singer and songwriter (1939–2022)

Norma Waterson MBE
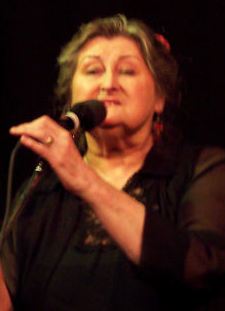
- Waterson at a Waterson:Carthy performance in Cranleigh, Surrey, in 2006

Background information
- Born: Norma Christine Waterson; 15 August 1939; Hull, East Riding of Yorkshire, England
- Died: 30 January 2022 (aged 82) Scarborough, North Yorkshire, England
- Genre: Folk
- Occupations: Singer, songwriter, record producer
- Labels: Hannibal Records, Topic Records
- Formerly of: The Watersons; Blue Murder
- Spouse: Martin Carthy (m. 1972)
- Children: Eliza Carthy
- Relatives: Mike Waterson (brother); Lal Waterson (sister)

"We Poor Labouring Men"
from the 1999 album Broken Ground by Waterson:Carthy

Norma Christine Waterson MBE (15 August 1939 – 30 January 2022) was an English singer and songwriter, best known as one of the original members of The Watersons, a celebrated English traditional folk group. Other members of the group included her brother Mike Waterson and sister Lal Waterson, a cousin John Harrison and, in later incarnations of the group, her husband Martin Carthy.

Waterson was known as the "matriarch of the royal family of British folk music".

== Early life ==
Norma Christine Waterson was born in Hull, in the East Riding of Yorkshire, on 15 August 1939. Her parents died when she was young and she was raised, with her brother Mike and sister Lal, by their maternal grandmother, Eliza Ward, of Irish Gypsy descent. Waterson later recalled that her grandmother was "a lovely singer and knew a lot of parlour ballads and musical songs she had learned from her childhood, and we all used to sing them." Other members of the family, including her father and two uncles, were musical, playing the cornet, the banjo, the guitar and the organ.

== The Watersons ==
The band began in the early 1960s with the members being Norma, brother Mike, and sister Elaine (known as Lal), with their cousin John Harrison. They started as a skiffle band but moved on to playing more traditional material. Their first recordings date from 1965; the Topic Records sampler New Voices and their first album, Frost and Fire. Frost and Fire was awarded the Melody Maker Album of the Year. The albums The Watersons and A Yorkshire Garland came out in 1966 but the group disbanded in 1968. Norma moved to the island of Montserrat, working as a DJ for Radio Antilles.

The group reformed in 1972, with John Harrison briefly replaced by Bernie Vickers, performing on the Alan Plater TV Play for Today, "The Land of Green Ginger", set and filmed in Hull, and appearing in a scene filmed in the Bluebell Folk Club. Vickers was replaced the same year by Waterson's husband, Martin Carthy. This line-up recorded For Pence and Spicy Ale (1975), Sound, Sound Your Instruments of Joy (1977), and Green Fields (1981).

In the mid-1980s, Mike Waterson's daughter Rachel Waterson replaced Lal, due to the latter's illness, remaining with the group on Lal's return. Regular performing included a session for the BBC Andy Kershaw show in 1986. In 1987, the group collaborated with Swan Arcade to form Blue Murder, who performed and recorded sporadically with various line-ups. Subsequent line-ups fluctuated, featuring Waterson's daughter Eliza Carthy, Anne Waterson, Jill Pidd and Maria Gilhooley at various times, but recording only occasionally.

Lal Waterson died in 1998 and, by the early 1990s, Carthy, Waterson and their daughter Eliza had formed the group Waterson:Carthy. They stopped singing live on a regular basis, but occasionally reconvened, as "The Waterson Family", for special events. These have included "A Mighty River of Song" at the Royal Albert Hall on 12 May 2007, the BBC Radio 2 Electric Proms concert, "Once in a Blue Moon: A Tribute to Lal Waterson", at Cecil Sharp House in London on 25 October 2007 and "A Tribute to Bert," a concert celebrating the life and work of Albert Lancaster Lloyd, at Cecil Sharp House on 15 November 2008. During the summer of 2009, "The Waterson Family" performed at a number of festivals and large concerts throughout England and Ireland.

== Later career ==
Norma's solo debut album Norma Waterson was produced by John Chelew and released by Hannibal Records in 1996, and proved popular, receiving a nomination for the Mercury Music Prize. It included songs with her daughter Eliza, husband Martin Carthy and other members of The Watersons, as well as Danny Thompson (Pentangle), Richard Thompson (Fairport Convention) and Roger Swallow (the Albion Band). In 1999, the follow-up The Very Thought of You was released by Hannibal Records and once again featured Richard Thompson, Danny Thompson, Eliza Carthy and husband Martin Carthy.

In 2001 she released her first solo traditional folk album, Bright Shiny Morning, on Topic Records. She appeared on a variety of collective recordings, notably Peter Bellamy's The Transports. In 2008 Waterson made a guest appearance alongside brother Mike on Scottish musician James Yorkston's album When the Haar Rolls In, singing her sister Lal's song, "Midnight Feast".

In 2009 Topic Records released a 70-year anniversary boxed set Three Score and Ten. This included two Watersons albums and one Waterson:Carthy album; Frost and Fire, For Pence and Spicy Ale and Waterson:Carthy. The tracks that Norma performs on are Hal-An-Tow (track 11 on the second CD), Three Score and Ten (track 17), We Poor Labouring Men with Waterson:Carthy (track 21 on the sixth CD) and, with Blue Murder, "No One Stands Alone" (track 22 of the seventh CD).

In 2010 Waterson released an album of collaborations with her daughter Eliza entitled Gift. BBC reviewer Laura Barton wrote: "The gift in question here, one gathers, is a handing of talent from generation to generation; Norma Waterson and Eliza Carthy are, after all, the sublimely gifted mother and daughter who make up part of British folk's great dynasty." Commenting on the final song, "Shallow Brown", the reviewer noted: "Backed variously by other family members, including Eliza's father Martin Carthy on guitar as well as her cousin Oliver Knight on electric guitar, vocals and cello, there is a real sense of congregation and rootedness about this song, and indeed this record as a whole. Long may the dynasty flourish."

In 2016 Waterson received the Lifetime Achievement Award at the BBC Radio 2 Folk Awards alongside Joan Armatrading.

Waterson was known as the "matriarch of the royal family of British folk music". She continued to sing well in her 70s, and was described as "a hard-working, prolific artist who refused to stop recording or touring." Her final album, released in 2018, was Anchor, the second recorded with Eliza. It includes Waterson singing lead on a dramatic, jazz-edged treatment of the Tom Waits song "Strange Weather" and on a version of Nick Lowe's "The Beast in Me".

== Personal life and death ==
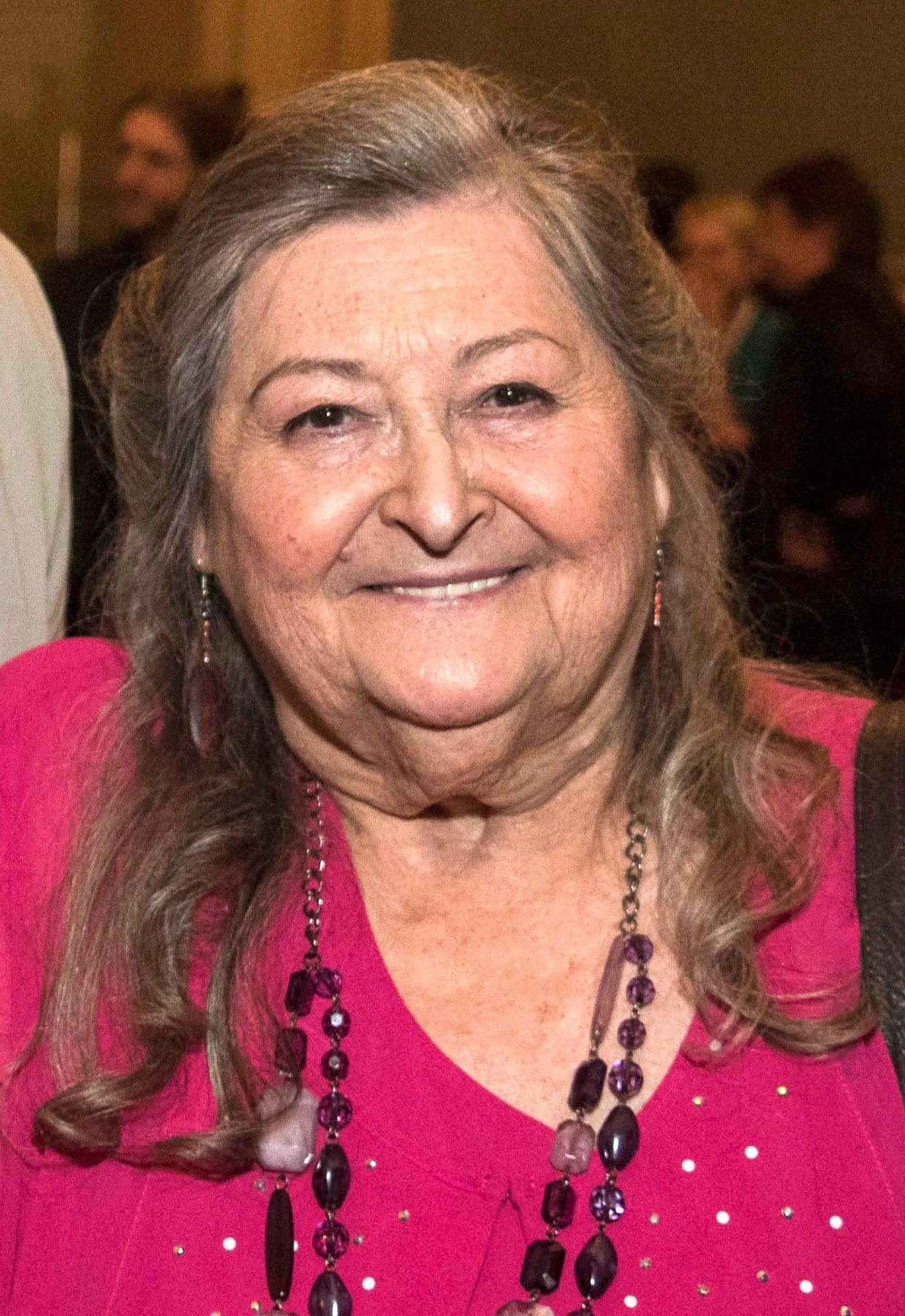
Waterson in 2016

Waterson married Martin Carthy in 1972. Their daughter Eliza Carthy was born in 1975. They also have another daughter named Lucy Carthy.

She was awarded the MBE (Member of the Order of the British Empire) in the Queen's 2003 New Year Honours, for her services to folk music.

Waterson died at Scarborough Hospital on 30 January 2022, at the age of 82. She had been suffering from pneumonia.

== Selected discography ==
=== With The Watersons ===
(all on Topic Records unless shown otherwise)

- Frost and Fire (1965)
- The Watersons (1966)
- A Yorkshire Garland (1966)
- For Pence and Spicy Ale (1975)
- A True Hearted Girl (1977) (Lal & Norma Waterson with Maria Waterson)
- Sound, Sound Your Instruments of Joy (1977)
- Green Fields (1981)
- Early Days (1994)
- Mighty River of Song (2004)
- A Yorkshire Christmas (Witchwood Collection, 2005)

=== With Waterson:Carthy ===
(all on Topic Records)

- Waterson:Carthy (1994)
- Common Tongue (1996)
- Broken Ground (1999)
- A Dark Light (2002)
- Fishes And Fine Yellow Sand (2004)
- Holy Heathens and the Old Green Man (2006)

=== Solo discography ===
- Norma Waterson (Hannibal Records, 1996)
- The Very Thought of You (Hannibal Records, 1999)
- Bright Shiny Morning (Topic Records, 2001)
- Gift (Topic Records, 2010) with Eliza Carthy
- Anchor (Topic Records, 2018) with Eliza Carthy and the Gift Band
