= Francis Grove =

Francis Groves (1623–1661) was a seventeenth century publisher based at Snow Hill, London.

He is recorded by Plomer as:

GROVE (FRANCIS), bookseller in London, (1) On Snow Hill, at the sign of the Windmill, neere vnto St. Sepulchre's Church, 1629; (2) Upper end of Snow Hill neere the Sarazen's Head, without Newgate, 1640. 1623–61. Took up his freedom June 30th, 1623. [Arber, iii. 685.] Dealt chiefly in ballads and the lighter literature of the period. The above addresses are taken from (1) R. Tarlton's Newes out of Purgatory, 1630, (2) Pleasant history of Cawood the Rook, 1640.

— Plomer's Dictionary of the booksellers and printers who were at work in England, Scotland and Ireland from 1641 to 1667 p.87

== Publications ==
- T. J. (1640), A discourse, betvveene Vpright the shoomaker and Master Pattent, the smith, London: Printed by B. Alsop, and T. F[awcet] for Francis Groves dwelling on Snow-Hill neare the Sarazens Head, OL 18477497M
- Edward Calver (1641), Passion and discretion, in youth and age .. (Passion and discretion, in youth and age ... ed.), London: Printed by T. & R. Cotes, for Francis Grove ..., OL 15018610M illustrated by Peter Stent.
- Thomas Brewer (1658), A knot of fooles (A knot of fooles ed.), Printed at London: for Francis Grove, and are to be sold at his shop on Snow hil near the Sarazens head without New-gate, OL 16858629M
