= Lester Simpson =

Lester Simpson is an English folk singer and former radio presenter on BBC Local Radio in Derbyshire, Nottinghamshire and Leicestershire. He featured in the now defunct three-piece folk group Coope, Boyes and Simpson. Barry Coope died in 2021, as did his co presenter on Folkwaves, Mick Peat.

The Belper Folk Club was a favourite with Lester in the early to mid 1970s. As a "floor singer" at this venue, he learned skills which he later developed with his fellows in Coope, Boyes and Simpson.

Lester has now semi retired and is happily leading 4 choirs in Derbyshire and Staffordshire.
