= Lang Johnny More =

Traditional song

Lang Johnny More is a traditional ballad and folk song, also known as Lang Johnnie More, Lang Johnnie Muir or other variants. It is Child ballad number 251 (Roud 3100).

== Synopsis ==
The song concerns a member of a clan of Scottish giants, one of whom, the Johnnie of the title, goes to visit London and falls in love with the king's daughter. The king subdues Johnnie by giving him drops of laudanum and imprisoning him. However Johnnie manages to send a small boy as a messenger back to his relatives in Scotland and two of them come down to London to set Johnnie free. One of them succeeds in bypassing the city gates by punching a hole in the wall and after this feat they are able to find and free their relative unopposed. Their heroic visage and dire threats of retribution convince the king to allow Johnnie to marry his daughter and all of them then go back to Scotland.

== Versions ==
- Battlefield Band recorded this song as Lang Johnnie Moir which has been collected on the album At the Front.
