= Marry Waterson =

British singer

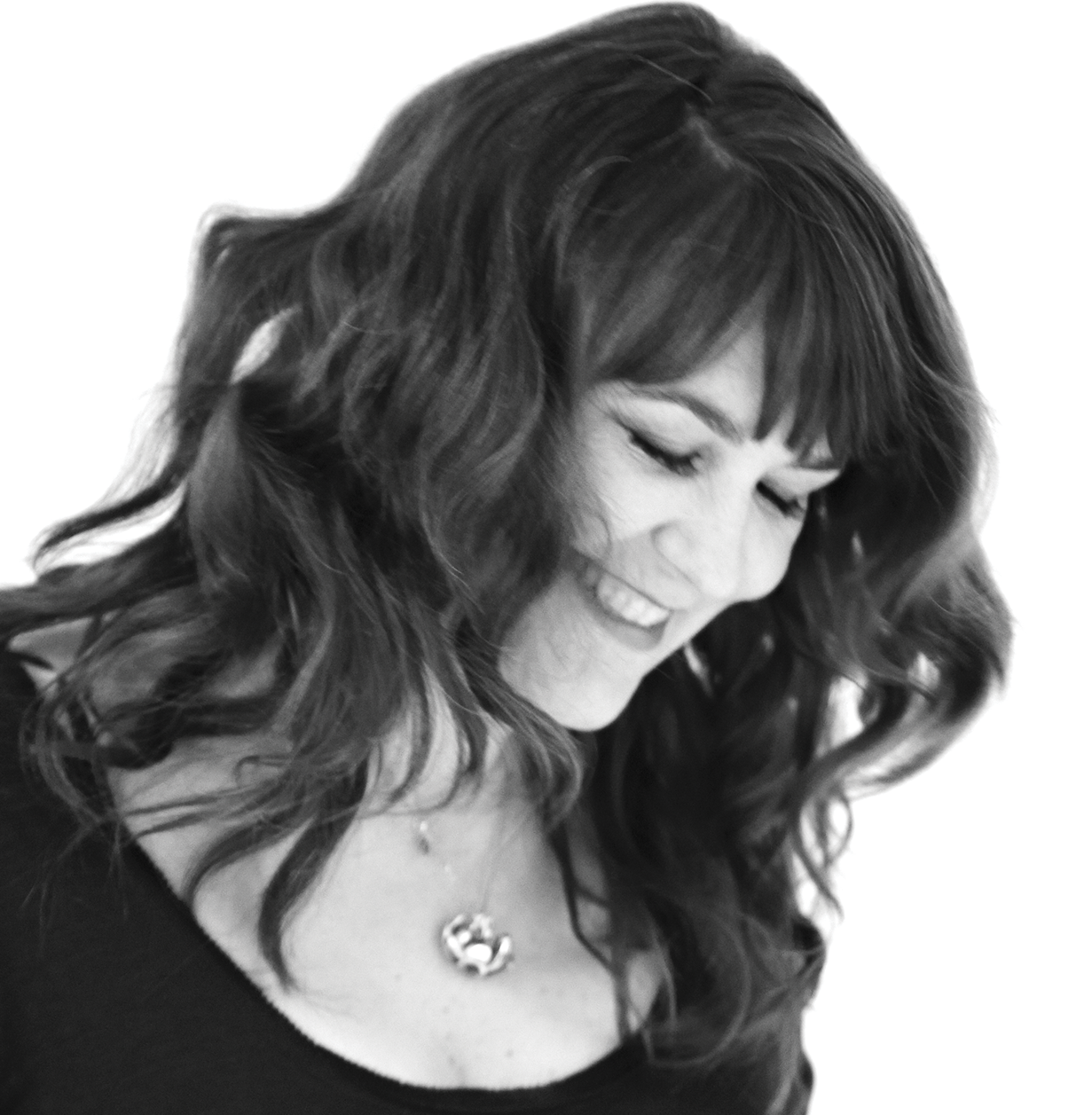
- Waterson in 2010

Background information
- Born: Maria Knight; Hull, East Riding of Yorkshire, England
- Genres: Folk
- Occupations: Musician, songwriter, music video animator
- Instrument: Vocalist
- Years active: 2010–present
- Labels: One Little Independent Records; Topic Records
- Formerly of: The Watersons; Blue Murder
- Website: marrywaterson.com

Maria Gilhooley (née Knight), who records under the name Marry Waterson, is a singer, songwriter and visual artist. A member of the Waterson-Knight-Carthy family musical dynasty, Waterson is described as having "thrived on communal music making while developing highly original and distinctly English performance styles of [her] own."

== Early life and Waterson family ==
Waterson is the daughter of Lal Waterson and George Knight and was born in the city of Hull, East Riding of Yorkshire. She made her recording debut as a guest on the album A True Hearted Girl by Lal and Norma Waterson in 1977. In 1988 she formed an occasional singing partnership with her mother Lal, aunt Norma and cousin Eliza Carthy under the name The Waterdaughters. She has since been a guest performer on numerous Watersons and Waterson–Carthy recordings and has often performed live with her family at festivals and special performances.

== Later musical career ==
On 12 May 2007, Waterson appeared with the Waterson family at a special concert at the Royal Albert Hall entitled A Mighty River of Song, and on 25 October 2007, she appeared at the BBC Radio 2 Electric Proms concert Once in a Blue Moon: A Tribute to Lal Waterson at Cecil Sharp House in London.

In 2007, Waterson replaced Eliza Carthy in Blue Murder, and made her concert debut with that group on 23 November at the Met Theatre in Bury, Greater Manchester.

In January 2010, Waterson performed at the Sydney Opera House in a line-up of rock, punk, pop and folk musicians under the musical direction of Hal Willner as part of his Rogue's Gallery project.

After signing to One Little Indian Records, in 2011 Waterson released the album The Days That Shaped Me, co-written with her brother Oliver Knight. The album was nominated for a Radio 2 Folk Award. During that year she both recorded and toured with her brother, billed as Marry Waterson & Oliver Knight. A second album by the siblings, Hidden, was released in 2012.

In October 2013, Waterson curated a tour with The Barbican bringing Bright Phoebus, by Lal and Mike Waterson, to the stage for the first time. She performed with a cast which included Jarvis Cocker and Richard Hawley amongst others. Also in 2013, Waterson designed and produced Teach Me to Be a Summer's Morning, a book and CD celebrating the works of Lal Waterson, released on the Fledg'ling Records imprint.

In 2015, Waterson released a third album, this time collaborating with guitarist David A. Jaycock, entitles Two Wolves. This album, produced by Neill MacColl, featured performances by Kate St John and Kami Thompson, one song for which Waterson shared writing credit with her late mother Lal Waterson, and another which incorporated a recording of her late uncle Mike Waterson.

== Reception ==
One review of The Days That shaped Me, Waterson's first album with Oliver Knight, noted that the brother and sister "have thrived on communal music making while developing highly original and distinctly English performance styles of their own." A review in The Independent called the album's songs "unadorned, sometimes courtly, always hard to read." Robin Denselow, in reviewing Hidden for The Guardian, described Waterson's singing as "no-nonsense, sometimes deadpan, but effectively varied" and stated that the album "sounds better each time you play it." Later reviewing Two Wolves for the website Freaky party, Denselow said that Waterson's "singing is plaintive and quietly powerful, and the songs are slow but varied".

== Other artistic pursuits ==
Waterson currently lives in Robin Hood's Bay, where she animates music videos, producing stage loops for Marc Almond. She has also worked as a graphic designer. Previously she developed a successful practice as a sculptor, working largely in sandstone. Her work has been exhibited at numerous locations in Yorkshire and the northeast of England, and she has completed several commissions.

== Discography ==
=== With Oliver Knight ===
- Marry Waterson & Oliver Knight: The Days That Shaped Me (2011)
- Marry Waterson & Oliver Knight: Hidden (2012)

=== With David Jaycock ===
- Marry Waterson & David A Jaycock: Two Wolves (2015)
- Marry Waterson & David A Jaycock: Death Had Quicker Wings Than Love (2017)

=== With Emily Barker ===
- Marry Waterson and Emily Barker: A Window to Other Ways (2019)

=== With Hack-Poets Guild (Lisa Knapp and Nathaniel Mann) ===
- Hack-Poets Guild: Blackletter Garland (2023)

=== With Adrian Crowley ===
- Marry Waterson and Adrian Crowley: Cuckoo Storm (2024)

=== Collaborations and guest appearances ===
- Lal & Norma Waterson: A True Hearted Girl (1977)
- Mike Waterson: Mike Waterson (1977)
- Lal Waterson & Oliver Knight: Once in a Blue Moon (1996)
- Lal Waterson & Oliver Knight: Bed of Roses (1998)
- Oliver Knight: Mysterious Day (2002)
- The Watersons: A Mighty River of Song (2004)
- Various artists: Evolving Tradition 4 (2004)
- Various artists: Rubber Folk: A Folk Tribute to the Beatles (2006)
- James Yorkston: When The Haar Rolls In (2008)
- Kathryn Williams: The Quickening (2009)
- Topic Records (70th anniversary boxed set): Three Score & Ten (2009)
- Eliza Carthy & Norma Waterson: Gift (2010)
- James Yorkston: I was A Cat From A Book (2011)
- Various artists: BBC Folk Awards (2012)
- Lisa Knapp: Hidden Seam (2013)
- (Lush) Fresh Handmade Sound: Hard Days Night Treatment (2014)
- A tribute to Ewan MacColl: Joy of Living (2015)

=== DVDs ===
- The Waterson Family: Live At Hull Truck (2011)
- James Yorkston: I Was A Cat From A Book, album & DVD (2011)
