= The Bonny Lass of Anglesey =

Traditional song

The Bonny Lass of Anglesey (Roud 3931, Child 220) is a traditional English-language folk song. Francis James Child classified it among the "historical" ballads.

== Synopsis ==
Fifteen English lords come to the king "To dance and win the victory." He gets the bonny lass to dance with them, offering her lands and either the fairest knight (of her choice), or the bravest, in his court. She wins. The fifteenth lord laid aside his sword but still had to admit defeat—in one variant, for exhaustion.

== Adaptions ==
Delia Sherman reworked this ballad in her short story "The Fiddler of Bayou Teche".
