= Howard Evans (trumpeter) =

Howard Evans (29 February 1944 – 17 March 2006) was a British trumpeter.

He was born in Chard, Somerset.

Having played in the band of the Welsh Guards and the London Symphony Orchestra, Evans moved into theatre work. He was a member of the line-up of the Albion Band which played for 'Larkrise' at the National Theatre. As a result of this, he was recruited as a member of the newly formed Home Service. Along with John Kirkpatrick, Evans played on Martin Carthy's albums Because It's There (1979) and Out of the Cut (1982) and toured with Carthy and Kirkpatrick sporadically during 1982 and 1983 in a line-up which, with the addition of Martin Brinsford and Roger Williams, later became Brass Monkey.

In 1965 he married Jacqueline Allen and they had one son and two daughters.

Howard Evans died of cancer on 17 March 2006.
