= Mike Waterson =

English folk singer and songwriter (1941–2011)

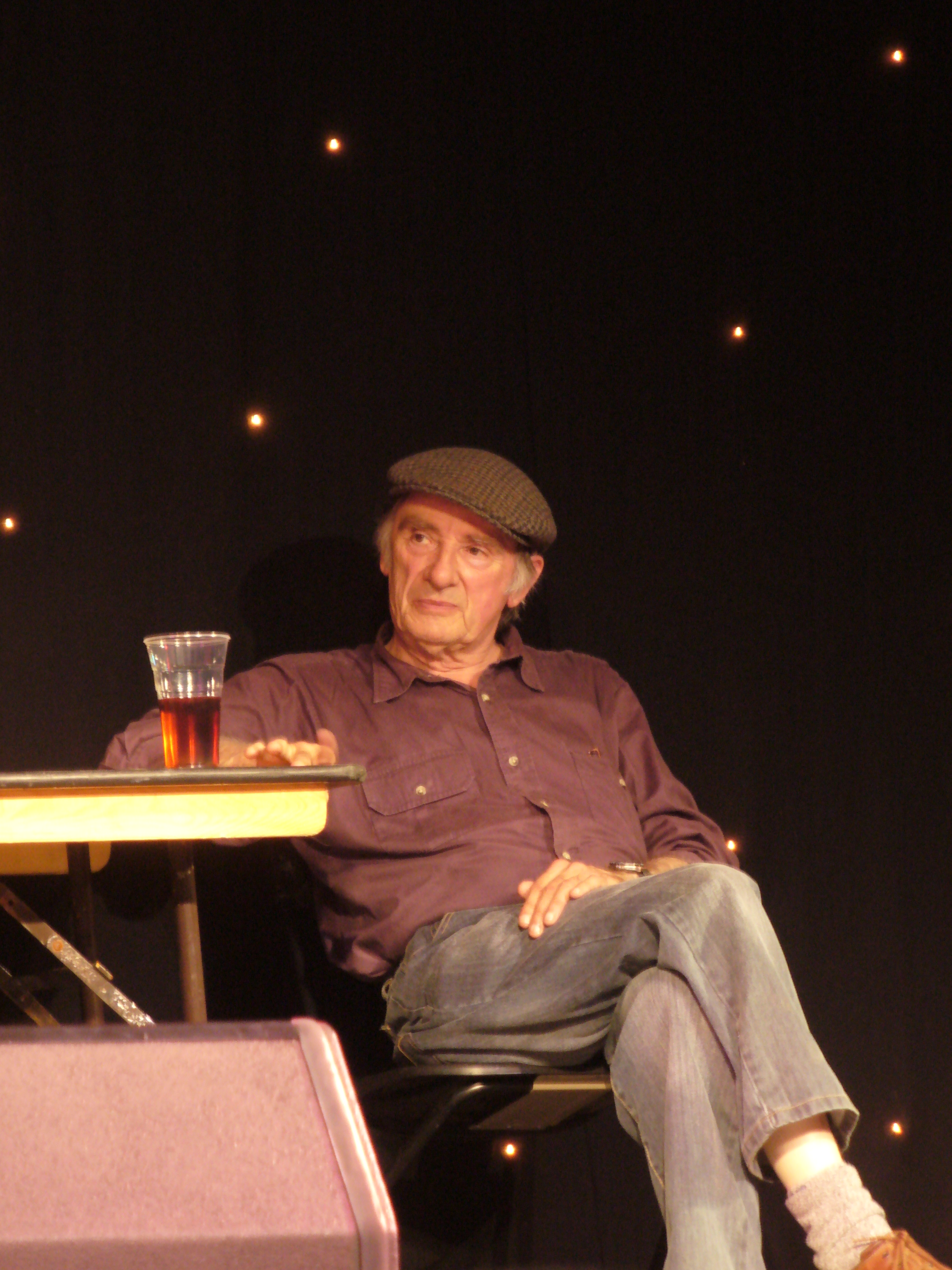
- Waterson at the 2009 Sidmouth Folk Week

Background information
- Born: Michael Waterson; 17 January 1941
- Died: 22 June 2011 (aged 70)
- Genres: Folk
- Occupations: English folk singer, songwriter
- Labels: Topic Records, Trailer Records, Pegasus Records, Witchwood Collection

Michael Waterson (17 January 1941 – 22 June 2011) was an English folk singer and songwriter.

== Biography ==
Waterson was born in Hull, East Riding of Yorkshire, England. After being orphaned at an early age, he was brought up there, with his sisters Norma and Lal, by their maternal grandmother, Eliza Ward, who ran a second-hand shop during the Second World War, and who was of Irish Gypsy descent. He is best known as a member of the Watersons, with his sisters Lal Waterson and Norma Waterson and originally with their cousin John Harrison and later with his brother-in-law Martin Carthy. In the 1968–1972 interval between the two incarnations of the Watersons, he and his sister Lal recorded the album Bright Phoebus. He and Lal were also part of the original Albion Country Band on the album No Roses with Shirley Collins.

He also released a solo album, simply called Mike Waterson, in 1977. "Tamlyn" from the album is track eight on the first CD of the Topic Records 70-year anniversary boxed set Three Score and Ten.

He was a member of Blue Murder. Waterson also appeared in the original recording of Peter Bellamy's The Transports. In 2008, Waterson made a guest appearance alongside Norma Waterson on Scottish musician James Yorkston's album When the Haar Rolls In, singing his sister Lal Waterson's song, "Midnight Feast".

He had three daughters, one son, and five grandchildren. His daughter Rachel sang with the Watersons group in the late '80s, and his wife and two daughters sang with others of the family in the concert The Waterson Family: A Mighty River of Song.

He died on 22 June 2011, aged 70, in Scarborough, North Yorkshire.

== Discography ==
Solo

- Mike Waterson (Topic, 1977)

With Lal Waterson

- Bright Phoebus (Trailer, 1972)

With The Albion Country Band

- No Roses (with Shirley Collins) (Pegasus, 1971)

With The Watersons

- Frost and Fire (Topic, 1965)
- The Watersons (Topic, 1966)
- A Yorkshire Garland (Topic, 1966)
- For Pence and Spicy Ale (Topic, 1975)
- Sound, Sound Your Instruments of Joy (Topic, 1977)
- Green Fields (Topic, 1981)
- Early Days (Topic, 1994)
- Mighty River of Song (Topic, 2004)
- A Yorkshire Christmas (Witchwood Collection, 2005)
