= Oliver Knight =

British singer-songwriter

Oliver Knight (born 1969) is a British singer-songwriter and sound engineer. He is son to folk singer-songwriter Lal Waterson and George Knight. He is brother and stage partner to folk musician Marry Waterson.

== Early life ==
Oliver Knight was born in Kingston upon Hull, East Riding of Yorkshire, England. Son to George and Elaine Knight (Lal Waterson) with one sister Maria Knight (Marry Waterson), he and his family lived in Park Avenue, Hull until 1976 and then moved to St. Ives Farm, Robin Hood's Bay.

He attended Bricknall Ave in Hull, then Fylingthorpe C of E, Eskdale and then Whitby. Knight then went to Scarborough Technical College to study Art & Design for one year.

== Collaboration with Lal Waterson ==
After buying a four-track machine, Knight started experimenting with recording music, leaving home temporarily and playing in various blues and rock cover bands, but moving back to his parents' house in 1993. His mother had been asked to provide a track for a sampler CD for the musicians' co-op No Masters, to highlight the songwriting talent they had in their organisation. "Mum and I had played songs together in the past and we were always saying to each other, "What do you think to this track or that", but it wasn't until she asked me to play guitar for her on Midnight Feast that we clicked." Knight developed a writing partnership with his mother and eventually they collaboratively recorded the studio album Once in a Blue Moon released in 1996 to much acclaim, with a vinyl reissue in 2009. Lal Waterson died in 1998, just before their second album, A Bed Of Roses, was finished. The material was fully recorded already, and it was released posthumously.

== Live Sound ==
In 1994, Knight decided to branch out as a live sound engineer and his first job was with a band called The Whisky Priests.

== Panda Sound ==
The song "Midnight Feast" was recorded at a studio in North Dalton called Panda Sound (P.A. North Dalton Associates), owned and run by Ray Williams. Knight was instantly taken by the recording process and becoming a sound engineer, and although still working as a gardener, whenever Williams had a session in he would invite Knight to help him and teach him all he could.

Around 1995, Ray Williams decided to sell the studio to Oliver. Relocating the studio to Robin Hood's Bay, Knight soon gained a good reputation for studio work and live sound, working in other studios and touring in America, Canada and Europe. In 1996, Knight left his gardening job and became a full-time self-employed sound engineer. Over the course of working at Panda Sound, Knight has recorded over 120 albums. Knight tour-managed and was live sound engineer for Kate & Anna McGarrigle.

== Marry Waterson ==
In 2002, Knight released his solo album Mysterious Day with various guest vocalists.

In 2006, he was involved with the band Van Eyken. He recorded and co-produced their album Stiffs Lovers Holymen Thieves, from which the track "Barleycorn" won Best Traditional Track in the BBC Radio 2 Folk Awards in 2007.

In 2007, The Waterson Family were asked to create a show to be performed at The Royal Albert Hall and later that year Knight, along with James Yorkston, coordinated the show A Tribute To Lal Waterson for the BBC Electric Proms.

These two shows marked the start of Waterson-Knight working together, leading to their album The Days That Shaped Me in 2011. Their second album Hidden was released in September 2012.

== Personal life ==
Knight is married to Helen, with a child Mae. Knight and his family moved out of Robin Hood's Bay and now live in the neighbouring village of Fylingthorpe.

In 2008, Knight decided to take a break from live sound and tour managing, took a condensed course and became an electrician. "My dad has been an electrician for 25 years so we now work together and I fit the music side of things in between.”

== Discography ==
- Once in a Blue Moon (1996) (with Lal Waterson)
- A Bed of Roses (1998) (with Lal Waterson)
- Mysterious Day (2002)
- The Days That Shaped Me (2011) (with Marry Waterson)
- Hidden (2012) (with Marry Waterson)
