= The Watersons =

English traditional folk singers from Hull

- Late line-up of The Watersons featuring (left to right) Norma, Martin Carthy, Rachel, Mike and Lal Waterson. Live at the Rockingham Arms, Wentworth, South Yorkshire, 16 October 1987

Background information
- Origin: Hull, East Riding of Yorkshire, England
- Genre: Folk
- Past members: Norma Waterson; Mike Waterson; Lal Waterson; Bernie Vickers; John Harrison; Martin Carthy; Rachel Waterson

The Watersons were an English folk group from Hull, Yorkshire. They performed mainly traditional songs with little or no accompaniment. Their distinctive sound came from their closely woven harmonies. They have been called the "most famous family in English folk music".

== Style ==
Their style is a unique blend of originality and tradition. The Watersons never learned to read music. They began by singing hunting songs, hymns and carols with their grandmother, ones that she probably sang with her parents. One family member would sing the melody, and the rest would join in, choosing a harmony note if the melody was out of their range.

Their style can be compared to the Copper Family of Sussex, a dynasty of traditional singers who sing in harmony, which was extremely unusual in traditional English music.

== Career ==
The band's original members were Norma, Mike, and Elaine known as Lal Waterson, with their cousin John Harrison from Kingston High School. They had a skiffle band in the early 1960s but moved on to playing more traditional material. They were briefly known as "the Folksons".

Their first album was Frost and Fire 1965, followed by The Watersons and A Yorkshire Garland in 1966. The Watersons split up in 1968, when Norma went to work as a disc jockey on a radio station on Montserrat.

The group reformed in 1972, with John Harrison briefly replaced by Bernie Vickers. In that year they performed and arranged the music for the Alan Plater TV Play for Today, "The Land of Green Ginger", set and filmed in Hull, and appeared in a scene filmed in the Bluebell Folk Club.

Vickers was replaced the same year by Norma's husband, Martin Carthy. This line-up recorded For Pence and Spicy Ale (1975), Sound, Sound Your Instruments of Joy (1977), and Green Fields (1981).

Later line-ups featured Mike Waterson's daughter Rachel Waterson, who briefly replaced Lal during a leave of absence caused by ill health in the mid-1980s, then continued to sing with the group on Lal's return. This five-piece line up performed regularly during the late 1980s and recorded a session for the BBC Andy Kershaw show in August 1986. In 1987, the group collaborated with Swan Arcade to form Blue Murder, who have performed and recorded sporadically with various line-ups to the present day. Subsequent Watersons line-ups fluctuated, featuring Eliza Carthy, Anne Waterson, Jill Pidd and Maria Gilhooley at various times, but recording only occasionally.

Lal Waterson died in 1998 and, by the early 1990s, Carthy, Norma Waterson and their daughter Eliza Carthy had formed the group Waterson–Carthy. The Watersons gradually ceased to sing live on a regular basis, but the family occasionally reconvened for special events and festival appearances, where they are usually billed as "The Waterson Family". These have included 'A Mighty River of Song' at the Royal Albert Hall on 12 May 2007, the BBC Electric Proms concert, 'Once in a Blue Moon: A Tribute to Lal Waterson', at Cecil Sharp House in London on 25 October 2007 and 'A Tribute to Bert,' a concert celebrating the life and work of Albert Lancaster Lloyd, at Cecil Sharp House on 15 November 2008. During the summer of 2009, "The Waterson Family" performed at a number of festivals and large concerts throughout England and Ireland.

Mike Waterson died on 22 June 2011, aged 70, at Scarborough, North Yorkshire.

Norma Waterson died on 30 January 2022, at the age of 82.

== Commendations ==
The accompanying book to the Topic Records 70 year anniversary boxed set Three Score and Ten lists two of their albums as classic albums. The first is Frost and Fire with Hal-an-Tow as the eleventh track on the second CD and the second is For Pence and Spicy Ale. The title track of the boxed set is taken from the various artists album New Voices and is the seventeenth track on the sixth CD.

== Discography ==
- Various Artists: New Voices: An Album of First Recordings by Harry Boardman, Maureen Craik, The Waterson Family (1965)
  The five Watersons tracks included on this album later formed part of the Early Days CD (1994)
- The Watersons: Frost and Fire: A Calendar of Ceremonial Folk Songs (1965)
  Reissued on CD with additional tracks from Sound, Sound Your Instruments of Joy in 1990. Original album reissued on CD with remastered audio in 2007.
- The Watersons: The Watersons (1966)
  All tracks included on this album later formed part of the Early Days CD (1994)
- The Watersons: A Yorkshire Garland (1966)
  Ten of the original fourteen tracks later formed part of the Early Days CD (1994)
- Lal & Mike Waterson: Bright Phoebus: Songs by Lal & Mike Waterson (1972)
  Briefly reissued on CD in 2000. Remastered & reissued with a bonus disc of demos in 2017 by Domino Recording Company Ltd.
- The Watersons: For Pence and Spicy Ale (1975)
  Reissued on CD with additional tracks from A True Hearted Girl and Mike Waterson in 1993. Original album reissued on CD with remastered audio in 2008.
- Lal & Norma Waterson with Maria Waterson: A True Hearted Girl (1977)
  Reissued on CD in 1999 with additional tracks
- Mike Waterson: Mike Waterson (1977)
  Reissued on CD in 1999 with additional tracks
- The Watersons: Sound, Sound Your Instruments of Joy (1977)
  Seven of the original fourteen tracks were included on the CD reissue of Frost and Fire in 1990. Original album reissued on CD with remastered audio in 2007.
- The Watersons: Green Fields (1981)
  Reissued on CD with additional tracks from A True Hearted Girl and Mike Waterson in 1998
- The Watersons: Travelling for a Living (circa 1994)
  Belated release of the 1965 BBC documentary on video. Later released on DVD as part of the Mighty River of Song box set (2004)
- The Watersons: Early Days (1994)
  Tracks from New Voices (1965), The Watersons (1966) and A Yorkshire Garland (1967) plus one previously unreleased track
- The Watersons: The Definitive Collection (2003)
  19-track compilation
- The Watersons: Mighty River of Song (2004)
  86-track, four CD, one DVD box set spanning over 40 years of Watersons and related recordings
- The Watersons: A Yorkshire Christmas (2005)
  The Watersons and friends/guests recorded live in December 1980
