= Lal Waterson =

English folk singer and songwriter (1943–1998)

- Born: Elaine Waterson; 15 February 1943; Hull, East Riding of Yorkshire, England
- Died: 4 September 1998 (aged 55)
- Genres: Folk
- Occupations: Musician, songwriter
- Instrument: Vocalist
- Years active: 1950s–1998
- Label: Topic
- Formerly of: The Watersons; Blue Murder

Elaine "Lal" Waterson (15 February 1943 – 4 September 1998) was an English folk singer and songwriter. She sang with, among others, the Watersons, the Waterdaughters and Blue Murder. She was born in Hull, East Riding of Yorkshire. In 1998, she died suddenly in Robin Hood's Bay, of cancer diagnosed only ten days before. Radio Times stated "Lal Waterson's voice was stark but captivating, her songs lyrically ambitious and melodically powerful."

Lal Waterson was the sister of Norma Waterson and Mike Waterson, the aunt of Eliza Carthy and the sister-in-law of Martin Carthy. She was married to George Knight and had two children, Oliver Knight and Maria Gilhooley, with both of whom she recorded albums.

== Biography ==
Lal, Norma, and Mike Waterson were orphans and brought up by their grandmother who was of part gypsy descent. Always very close, they began singing together, with cousin John Harrison, in the 1950s, with Lal 'singing unexpected harmonies.' Having opened their own folk club in a pub in the fishing port of Hull where they grew up, by the mid-1960s they had developed their own unaccompanied style singing harmony style re-workings of traditional English songs. In 1968, they stopped touring and became geographically separate for the first time – Norma went to Montserrat, and Lal to Leeds where her husband George lived, while Mike stayed in Hull. Both Mike and Lal were writing songs and when Lal returned to Hull they began working together. When Martin Carthy heard Lal's songs, he found them extraordinary. At this time Carthy was in the folk-rock band Steeleye Span and he told the bass player Ashley Hutchings about Lal and Mike's songs and together they arranged to have them recorded, not unaccompanied, but with a backing band that included Carthy, Hutchings and Richard Thompson. Bright Phoebus was released in 1972 and "caused a quiet sensation".

Her songs sometimes echoed traditional material but also involved a variety of other influences – 'some veered towards jazz and ragtime, others like Winifer Odd had a quirky charm worthy of the Beatles, but with bleak lyrics added. Another favourite Fine Horseman, made use of unexpected chords and structures.' Lyrics were as important to her as the music. The writer she admired most was the 19th century French poet Arthur Rimbaud.

In 1976, all three Waterson siblings moved to Kirk Moor on the edge of the North York Moors and re-formed the group, with Martin Carthy taking over for John Harrison. In the 1980s, Lal and George, and Norma and Martin, moved to Robin Hood's Bay, where the sea and landscape of the area often became the inspiration for Lal's songs. She left the Watersons in 1990 for health reasons, staying at Robin Hood's Bay, still writing and painting, and recorded her songs at home with her son Oliver Knight, who was a producer, guitarist, and songwriter. When Once in a Blue Moon was released however, she refused to sing the songs live – perhaps the result of a bad experience while singing with the Watersons. According to Martin Carthy: "She was a perfectionist.. she never sang solo after she forgot something on stage.. she couldn't bear the idea of it going wrong."

Whilst recording Bed of Roses with Oliver Knight, Lal died of cancer; the album was released posthumously.

Migrating Bird: The Songs of Lal Waterson (2007) is a tribute album, with contributions from James Yorkston, Alasdair Roberts, Willard Grant Conspiracy, Vashti Bunyan, Victoria Williams and others. Jo Freya's album Lal (2007) is another tribute to her.

Her songs have been covered by a series of singers including June Tabor, Billy Bragg, the Fatima Mansions, Lady Maisery, the Unthanks, and Boiled in Lead. Rachel Unthank said: "Her lyrics are so descriptive and evocative... the melodies twist and turn in ways I wouldn't expect, and yet each line seems to melt into each other."

Bright Phoebus, released in 1972 by Lal and Mike Waterson, was reissued in 2017 by Domino. The reissue included previously unheard home demo recordings, and was remastered from the original tapes.

== Discography ==
- Lal and Mike Waterson – Bright Phoebus (1972)
- Lal and Norma Waterson – A True Hearted Girl (1977)
- Lal Waterson & Oliver Knight – Once in a Blue Moon (1996)
- Lal Waterson & Oliver Knight – A Bed of Roses (1999)
