= Martin Carthy =

English singer and guitarist (born 1941)

Martin Carthy MBE
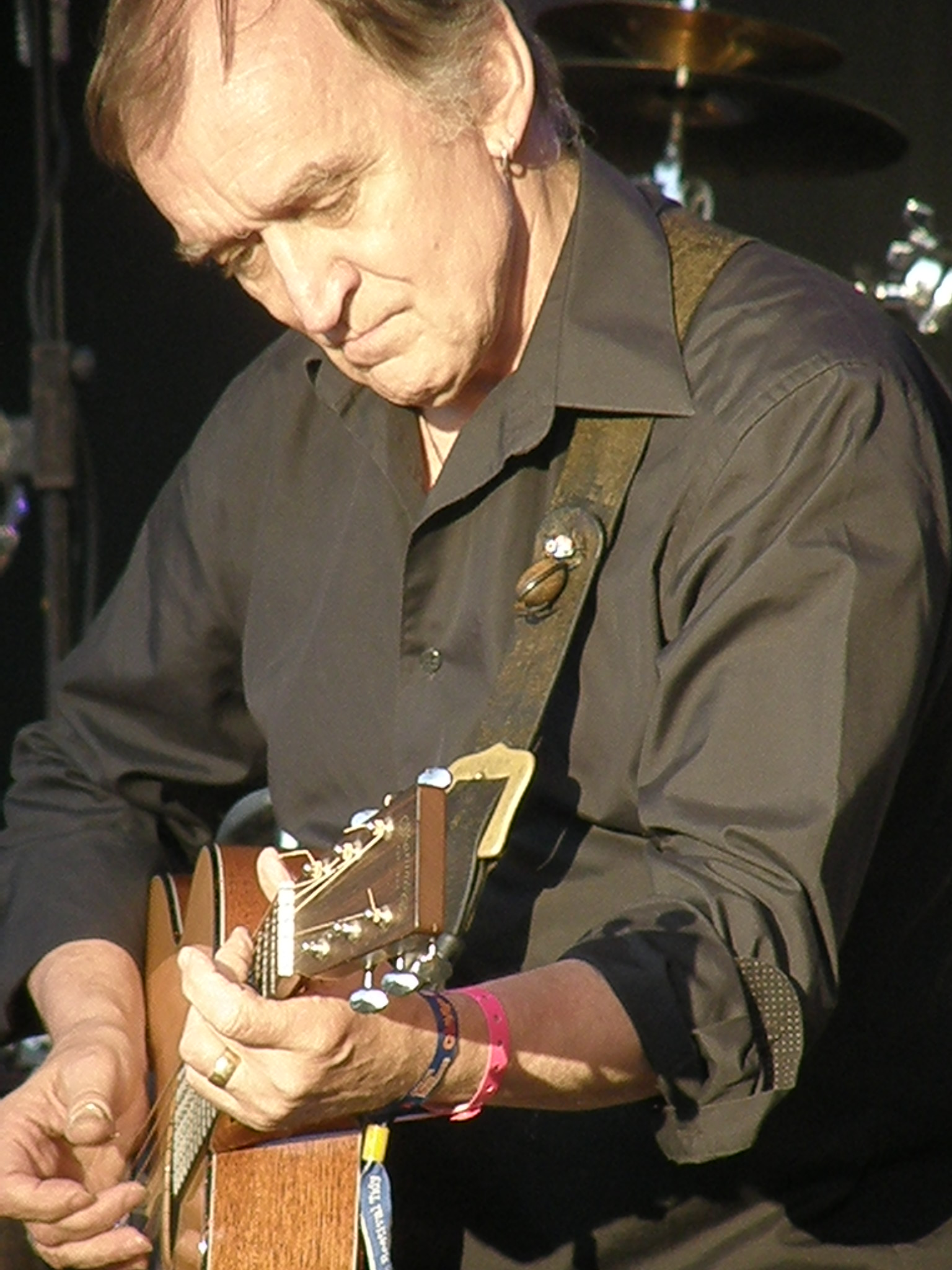
- Performing with The Imagined Village at Camp Bestival, July 2008

Background information
- Born: Martin Dominic Forbes Carthy; 21 May 1941 (age 85); Hatfield, Hertfordshire, England
- Origin: London, England
- Genres: English folk; folk baroque; British folk rock
- Occupations: Singer; musician; songwriter; record producer
- Instruments: Vocals; guitar; mandolin; banjo; dulcimer; organ
- Years active: 1960–present
- Labels: Topic; Fontana; Philips; Deram; B&C
- Spouse: Norma Waterson (m. 1972; died 2022)
- Children: Eliza Carthy
- Relatives: Mike Waterson (brother-in-law); Lal Waterson (sister-in-law)

Martin Dominic Forbes Carthy MBE (born 21 May 1941) is an English singer and guitarist who has remained one of the most influential figures in English folk music, inspiring contemporaries such as Bob Dylan and Paul Simon, as well as later artists such as Richard Thompson, since he emerged as a young musician in the early days of the folk revival in the UK during the 1960s and 1970s.

== Early life ==
Carthy was born in Hatfield, Hertfordshire, England, and grew up in Hampstead, North West London. His mother was an active socialist and his father, from a family of River Thames lightermen, went to grammar school and became a trade unionist and a councillor for Stepney at the age of 21. Martin's father had played fiddle and guitar as a young man but Martin was unaware of this connection to his folk music heritage until much later in life. His vocal and musical training began when he became a chorister at the Queen's Chapel of The Savoy.

He picked up his father's old guitar for the first time after hearing "Rock Island Line" by Lonnie Donegan. He has cited his first major folk music influences as Big Bill Broonzy and the syncopated guitar style of Elizabeth Cotten. Carthy performed his first professional engagement at the age of 16 at The Loft, a coffee bar in Primrose Gardens, Belsize Park, London. Although his father wanted him to go to university to study classics, Carthy left school at 17 and worked behind the scenes as a prompter at the open-air theatre in Regent's Park, then as an assistant stage manager (ASM) on a tour of The Merry Widow, and then at Theatre in the Round in Scarborough. He became a resident at the Troubadour folk club in Earl's Court in the early 1960s after his friend Robin Hall persuaded him to visit and listen to the piper Seamus Ennis. Carthy joined Redd Sullivan's Thameside Four in 1961 as a skiffle guitarist and singer.

In the early 1960s, Carthy visited Ewan MacColl's Ballads & Blues club to watch a friend, the singer Roy Guest. The main performer that night was Sam Larner. Carthy has since described how Larner's performance of "Lofty Tall Ship" altered his perception of how a traditional folk song could be sung, and how it was a key moment in his own development as an artist.

When American singer Bob Dylan arrived in London for the first time in 1962 to perform in Madhouse on Castle Street, he visited Martin Carthy at the Troubadour, The King & Queen, and The Singers Club. He learned the traditional song "Scarborough Fair" from Carthy, which he later developed into his own song "Girl from the North Country".

In 1963 and 1964 he contributed songs to the UK regional television folk and blues music series Hullabaloo, presented by the Scottish folksinger Rory McEwen; these sessions were released on DVD in 2020.

== Musical career ==
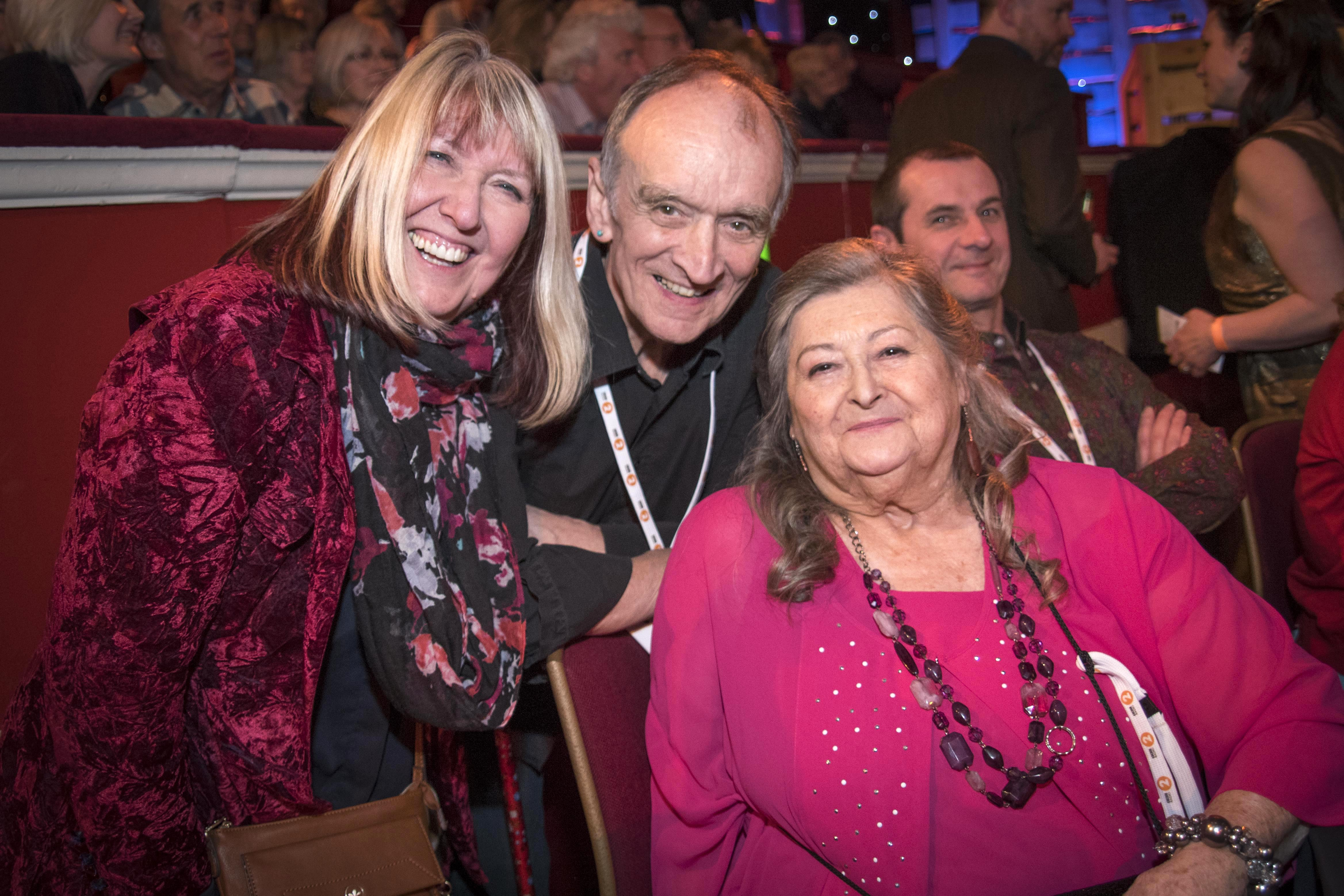
Martin Carthy with Maddy Prior and Norma Waterson

Carthy is a mostly solo performer of traditional songs in a very distinctive style, accompanying himself on his Martin 000-18 acoustic guitar; his style is marked by the use of alternative tunings (notably CGCDGA), and a strongly percussive picking style that emphasises the melody.

In 1964, Carthy joined Marian Mackenzie, Ralph Trainer and Leon Rosselson in the group The Three City Four. The group concentrated on contemporary songs, including some of Rosselson's own, and made two albums – the first for Decca and a second, Smoke and Dust (Where the Heart Should Have Been), for CBS. The 1965 eponymous debut The Three City Four featured Carthy singing lead vocals on two tracks – Sydney Carter's "Telephone Song" and Rosselson's own "History Lesson". Roy Bailey would replace Carthy when he later left the group.

Carthy's debut solo album, Martin Carthy, was released in 1965, and also featured Dave Swarbrick playing fiddle on some tracks, although he was not mentioned in the album's sleeve notes. Carthy's arrangement of the traditional ballad "Scarborough Fair" was adapted, without acknowledgement, by Paul Simon on the Simon & Garfunkel album recording Parsley, Sage, Rosemary and Thyme in 1966. This caused a rift between the pair which was not resolved until Simon invited Carthy to sing the song with him on-stage at the Hammersmith Apollo in 2000.

== Musical collaborations ==
He has also been involved with many musical collaborations. He has sung with The Watersons since 1972; was twice a member of British folk rock group Steeleye Span; was a member of the Albion Country Band 1973 line-up, with members from the Fairport Convention family and John Kirkpatrick, that recorded the Battle of the Field album; and was part of the innovative Brass Monkey ensemble, which mixed a range of brass instruments with Carthy's guitar and mandolin and John Kirkpatrick's accordion, melodeon and concertina. Carthy was also a member of The Imagined Village for all three of their albums (2007–2012).

For many years, Carthy enjoyed a creative partnership with fiddle player Dave Swarbrick, then later, Waterson:Carthy provided the forum for his successful musical partnership with wife Norma Waterson and their daughter Eliza Carthy.

Carthy has inspired contemporaries such as Bob Dylan and Paul Simon, as well as later artists such as Richard Thompson.

== Personal life ==
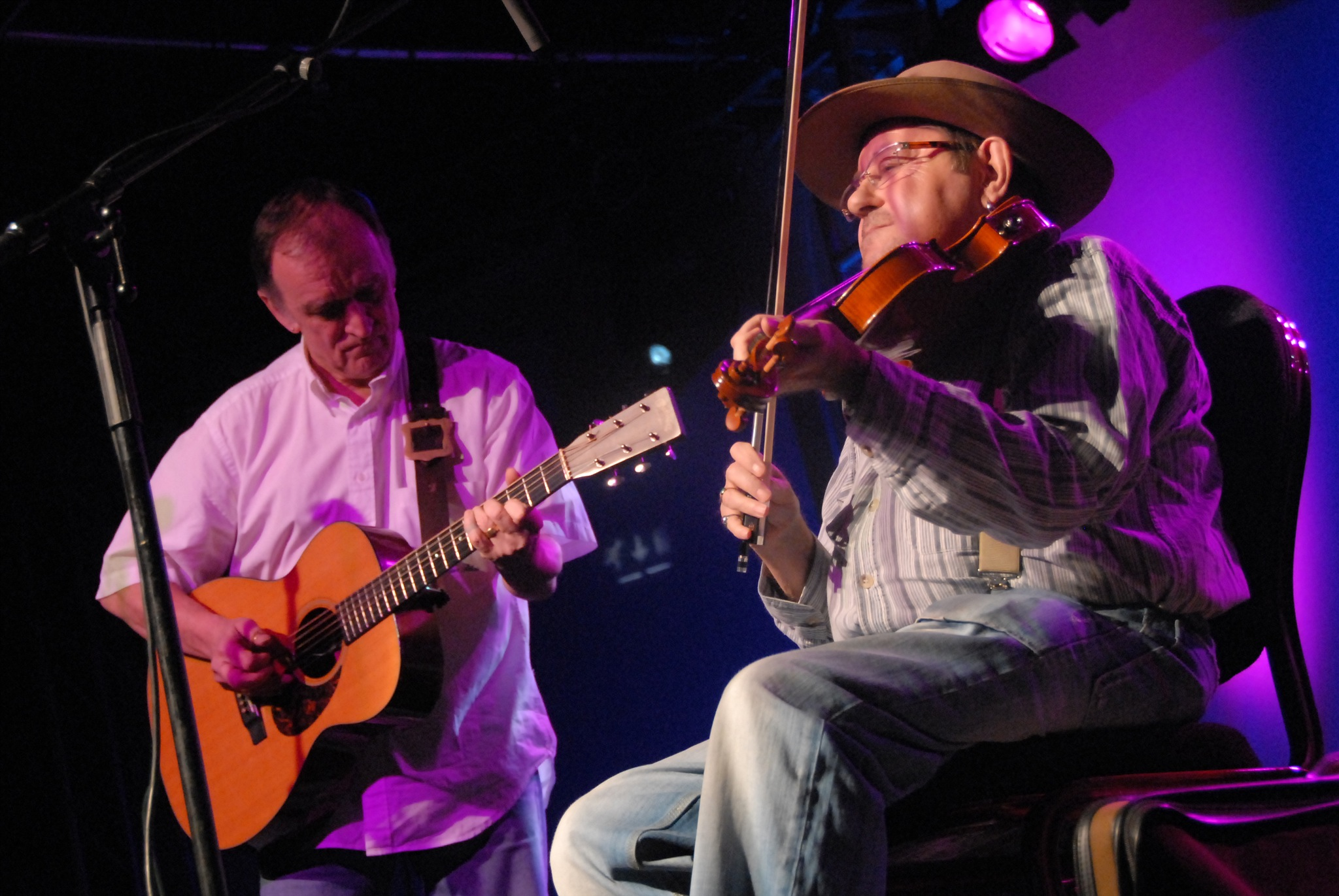
Carthy with Dave Swarbrick, at the BBC Radio 2 Folk Awards 2007

Carthy married Norma Waterson in 1972. She died in 2022. Their daughters are Eliza Carthy, born in 1975, and Lucy Carthy, who is married to Saul Rose.

Carthy has lived for many years in Robin Hood's Bay, North Yorkshire. In late 2025 he was diagnosed with late onset Alzheimer's disease after which it was announced that he would retire from touring.

== Awards and honours ==
In June 1998 he was appointed MBE in the Queen's Birthday Honours. He was named Folk Singer of the Year at the BBC Radio 2 Folk Awards in 2002, and again in 2005 when he also won the award for Best Traditional Track for "The Famous Flower of Serving-Men". In the 2007 Folk Awards Martin Carthy and Dave Swarbrick won Best Duo. In 2008 he was made an Honorary Fellow of the University of Lancashire. In 2014 he was awarded the Lifetime Achievement Award at the BBC Radio 2 Folk Awards. On 10 September 2025, Transform Me Then Into a Fish was announced as one of 12 nominees for the 2025 Mercury Prize.

A tribute concert to Carthy was held 27 September 2025 at EartH, Hackney in London, with performances by Billy Bragg, Graham Coxon, and many others, and video tributes from KT Tunstall, Robert Plant, Paul Weller, and Bob Dylan.

== Discography ==
=== Original/studio albums (solo, with Dave Swarbrick or with Eliza Carthy) ===
- Martin Carthy (1965) with Dave Swarbrick
- Second Album (1966) with Dave Swarbrick
- Byker Hill (1967) with Dave Swarbrick
- But Two Came By (1968) with Dave Swarbrick
- Prince Heathen (1969) with Dave Swarbrick
- Landfall (1971)
- Shearwater (1972 / 2005 with extra tracks)
- Sweet Wivelsfield (1974)
- Crown of Horn (1976)
- Because It's There (1979)
- Out of the Cut (1982)
- Right of Passage (1988)
- Life and Limb (1990) with Dave Swarbrick
- Skin and Bone (1992) with Dave Swarbrick
- Signs of Life (1998)
- Waiting for Angels (2004)
- Straws in the Wind (2006) with Dave Swarbrick
- The Moral of the Elephant (2014) with Eliza Carthy
- Transform Me Then Into a Fish (2025)

=== Compilations and live albums ===
- This Is... Martin Carthy: The Bonny Black Hare and other songs (1971) with Dave Swarbrick [six tracks from Byker Hill and six tracks from But Two Came By]
- Selections (1971) with Dave Swarbrick [six tracks from Byker Hill; three tracks from No Songs EP, 1967; three tracks from But Two Came By]
- Selections (1972), New Zealand and Australia only
- Round Up (circa early 1970s) with Dave Swarbrick [second side of Martin Carthy and first side of Second Album]
- Brigg Fair (circa early 1970s) with Dave Swarbrick [reissue of Byker Hill]
- Tales of Long Ago (circa early 1970s) with Dave Swarbrick [reissue of But Two Came By]
- The Collection (1993)
- Rigs of the Time: The Best Of Martin Carthy (1993)
- The Kershaw Sessions (1994) [recorded for BBC Radio, 1987 and 1988]
- A Collection (1999)
- Both Ears and the Tail (2000, live recording from 1966) with Dave Swarbrick
- The Carthy Chronicles (2001), 4-CD 83-track box set
- The Definitive Collection (2003)
- Martin Carthy at Ruskin Mill (2005) [very limited release – only 200 copies]
- The January Man: Live In Belfast 1978 (2011)
- Walnut Creek: Live Recordings, 1989–1996 (2011)
- Essential Martin Carthy (2011)
- The Folk Vault: Martin Carthy, Live in Whitby 1984 (2013)

=== Releases on other formats ===
- No Songs (7-inch vinyl EP 1967) with Dave Swarbrick
- "The Bonny Lass of Anglesey" b/w "Palaces of Gold" (7-inch vinyl single 1976)
- 100 Not Out (1992), longform video with Dave Swarbrick
- British Fingerstyle Guitar (instructional VHS video released 1993, reissued on DVD 2006)
- Guitar Maestros (DVD 2006)

=== As a member of Steeleye Span ===
- Please to See the King (1971)
- Ten Man Mop, or Mr. Reservoir Butler Rides Again (1971)
- Storm Force Ten (1977)
- Live at Last (1978)
- The Journey (Live at The Forum, London, 1995) (1999)

=== With Ashley Hutchings, the Albion Country Band and the Albion Band ===
- Battle of the Field (1976, recorded 1973)
- Son of Morris On (1976)
- Rise Up Like the Sun (1978), as guest
- Lark Rise To Candleford (1980)
- The BBC Sessions (1998) (tracks 1–4 recorded 1973)

=== As a member of The Watersons and Waterson:Carthy ===
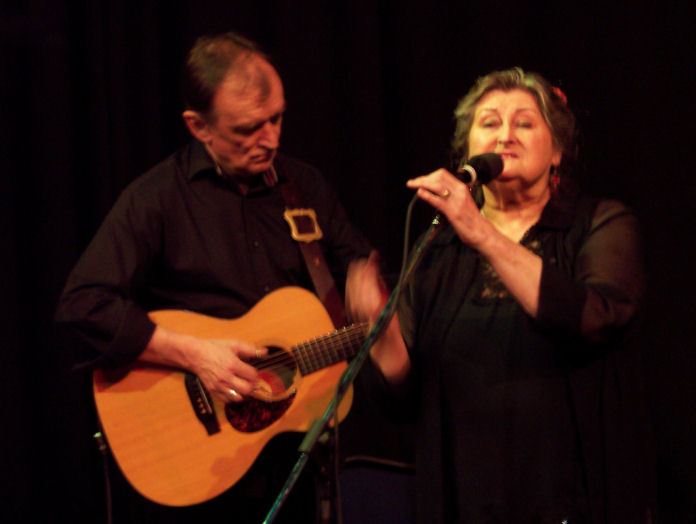
Martin Carthy and Norma Waterson at a Waterson:Carthy performance in Cranleigh, April 2006.

- Lal & Mike Waterson: Bright Phoebus (1972)
- The Watersons: For Pence and Spicy Ale (1975)
- The Watersons: Sound, Sound Your Instruments of Joy (1977)
- The Watersons: Green Fields (1981)
- Waterson:Carthy: Waterson:Carthy (1994)
- Waterson:Carthy: Common Tongue (1996)
- Waterson:Carthy: Broken Ground (1999)
- Waterson:Carthy: A Dark Light (2002)
- The Watersons: The Definitive Collection (2003)
- Waterson:Carthy: Fishes & Fine Yellow Sand (2004)
- The Watersons: Mighty River of Song (2004) 4-CD & DVD box set of Watersons and related recordings
- The Watersons: A Yorkshire Christmas (2005)
- Waterson:Carthy: The Definitive Collection (2005)
- Waterson:Carthy: Holy Heathens and the Old Green Man (2006)
- Norma Waterson & Eliza Carthy with the Gift Band: Anchor (2018)

=== As a member of Brass Monkey ===
- Brass Monkey (1984)
- See How It Runs (1986)
- The Complete Brass Monkey (1993) compilation of the previous two albums
- Sound and Rumour (1999)
- Going and Staying (2001)
- Flame of Fire (2004)
- The Definitive Collection (2005)
- Head of Steam (2009)

=== As a member of Blue Murder ===
- No One Stands Alone (2002)

=== Other notable releases ===
- Thamesiders & Davy Graham (1963) 7-inch EP
- Three City Four: Three City Four (1965)
- Dave Swarbrick, Martin Carthy & Diz Disley: Rags, Reels & Airs (1967)
- Hedy West, Serves 'Em Fine (1967) (as accompanist)
- John Kirkpatrick: Plain Capers (1976)
- Yuletracks (1986)
- Band of Hope: Rhythm And Reds (1994)
- Wood, Wilson, Carthy: Wood, Wilson, Carthy (1998)
- Dave Swarbrick: Swarb! (2003) 4-CD box set career retrospective with numerous Carthy tracks
- Martins4: Guitar Nights presents the Four Martins (2003) released on CD and DVD (DVD has additional tracks)
- Various Artists: The Imagined Village (2007)
- The Imagined Village: Empire & Love (2010)
- The Imagined Village: Bending The Dark (2012)
- Three City Four: Smoke & Dust (2010), compilation of tracks from two 1960s albums.
