= Songs (Spiers and Boden album) =

Studio album by Spiers and Boden
- Released: 2005
- Genre: Folk
- Length: 47:26
- Label: Fellside Recordings
- Producer: Jon Boden, John Spires and Ben Ivitsky

Spiers and Boden chronology
Tunes (2005)	Songs (2005)	Vagabond (2008)

Songs is an album by Spiers and Boden. It consists of traditional British folk songs and sea shanties, apart from Innocent When you Dream which was written by Tom Waits for the soundtrack to the film "Franks Wild Years". It was released less than six months after their previous album Tunes. Four of these songs concern murder, which gives a dark tone to the album. It was recorded and released in October 2005.

== Track listing ==
No.	Title	Writer(s)	Length
1.	"Bold Sir Rylas"	Child 18, Trad.	4:36
2.	"Old Maui"	Trad.	4:13
3.	"Horn Fair"	Trad.	3:37
4.	"Child Morris"	Trad.	7:10
5.	"Innocent When You Dream"	Tom Waits	4:41
6.	"Cruel Knife"	Trad.	4:43
7.	"Derry Gaol"	Trad.	4:18
8.	"On Christmas Day"	Trad.	1:21
9.	"Doleful Dance of Death"	Trad.	3:03
10.	"Bill Brown"	Trad.	4:09
11.	"Lucy Wan"	Trad.	5:29
Total length:			47:26

== Personnel ==
- Jon Boden (vocals, fiddle, guitar, concertina)
- John Spiers (vocals, melodeons, concertina, bandoneon).
