= A Folk Song a Day =

Project by folk musician Jon Boden

A Folk Song A Day
- Boden in one of the logos
- Genre: Folk music, Music podcast
- Language: English

Publication
- No. of episodes: 365
- Original release: 24 June 2010 – 24 June 2011
- Updates: Daily

Related
- Website: www.afolksongaday.com

A Folk Song a Day was a project by the English folk singer and musician and Bellowhead member Jon Boden where he recorded and released a folk song each day for one year. The project ended on 24 June 2011.

In 2026, Boden completed a book of 365 songs, based on this project. This is due to be published by Faber Music in November 2026. Boden talked about this project and an upcoming tour to Mark Radcliffe on BBC Radio 2 on 7 October 2026.

== About ==
The project started on 24 June 2010. It has resulted in 12 digital albums (one for each month). Boden hopes that it will promote social singing and be a resource for those looking for inspiration.

The songs can be bought in the form of digital download from Amazon or from iTunes. The project reached number one in the iTunes music podcast in its first week.

== The songs ==
A Folk Song a Day 1: July 2010

- Tyne of Harrow 05:18
- The Hunt Is Up 03:06
- I Wish That the Wars Were All Over 02:45
- Blackwaterside 02:03
- Barbara Allen 05:18
- Cruel Mother 05:49
- Chickens in the Garden 02:20
- Across the Line 02:54
- Pretty Cock / As I Stood Under My Love's Window 02:27
- Banks of Green Willow 04:24
- Danny Dever 04:41
- Mercedes Benz 01:56
- Rambling Sailor 02:42
- Yellow Roses 03:20
- Big Steamers 02:24
- Lucy Wan 03:30
- Come Write Me Down 02:52
- The Bloody Gardener 03:42
- Go and Leave Me 03:26
- Rain It Rains 03:26
- Stonecutter Boy 01:49
- Sally Free and Easy 03:19
- Young Edward in the Lowlands 03:54
- Old Tom Moor 05:00
- Tha' Lowks a Proper Swell 05:18
- Banks of Red Roses 02:20
- A Blacksmith Courted Me 03:22
- Maid of Australia 04:27
- Child Morris 07:04
- The Old Songs 04:23
- Tom Padget 03:49

A Folk Song a Day 2: August 2010

- (Now) Westlin Winds 03:43
- Two Young Brethren 02:09
- The Land 06:14
- Greenland Whale Fishery 03:22
- Brown Adam 04:24
- Shepherd of the Downs 04:09
- Derry Gaol 03:04
- Frankie's Trade 04:26
- Ca the Ewes 02:51
- Two Pretty Boys 02:26
- Cruel Knife 02:42
- Nostradamus 05:32
- Adieu Sweet Lovely Nancy 03:28
- Bold Sir Rylas 03:07
- Dream of Napoleon 03:34
- Live Not Where I Love 03:45
- Polly Vaughan 02:35
- Saucy Sailor 02:53
- Abroad for Pleasure 01:43
- Oggy Man 02:21
- Golden Glove 03:51
- Country Life 01:45
- Rolling Down to Old Maui 03:41
- Jordan Is a Hard Road 02:59
- Leave Her Johnny 02:40
- Doleful Dance of Death 02:58
- Randal 03:38
- Bonny House of Airlie 03:20
- Yorkshire Couple 02:26
- William Taylor 03:09
- Yarmouth Town 02:32

A Folk Song a Day 3: September 2010

- The Prentice Boy 02:49
- Light Dragoon 02:57
- London Waterman 02:14
- Noah's Ark Shanty 02:11
- King of Rome 02:56
- On a Monday Morning 02:29
- Fakenham Fair 03:30
- Rambling Robin 01:45
- In the Shade of the Old Harris Mill 02:34
- Sleep On Beloved 03:08
- Hey John Barleycorn 03:05
- Fathom the Bowl 03:07
- Water Is Wide 02:47
- The Rigs of the Time 02:53
- On Board 98 04:20
- Oats and Beans and Barley Grows 00:49
- The Irish Ballad (Rickety Tickety Tin) 02:20
- The Bush Girl 04:10
- The Lord Will Provide 02:19
- NaCl 01:56
- Down Where the Drunkards Roll 03:25
- The Trees They Do Grow High 02:25
- Blood Red Roses 02:13
- A-Begging I Will Go 02:51
- 10,000 Miles Away 02:13
- Sparrow 01:42
- Three Ravens 03:04
- Waltzing Matilda 03:21
- Brisk Young Widow 01:57
- All of a Row 02:14
- Barbaree (bonus song) 03:32

A Folk Song a Day 4: October 2010

- Prickle-Eye Bush 03:06
- The Huntsman 05:10
- Deep Blue Sea 03:38
- New York Girls 03:12
- Jersey Girl 04:07
- The Poor Man's Labours 01:46
- Bay of Biscay 02:46
- Gallant Hussar 03:18
- The Constant Lovers 05:17
- Hunting the Hare 01:12
- Courting Too Slow 03:51
- The Dawn of the Day 02:40
- The Sheepstealer 02:30
- Marrowbones 02:47
- Old Joe Clark 01:49
- Bill Brown 04:19
- Johnny's Gone to Hilo 03:23
- Sea Coal 03:49
- Pretty Nancy of Yarmouth 03:06
- Close the Coalhouse Door 02:38
- All for Me Grog 02:24
- Santa Fe Trail 04:51
- Jock Stewart 02:07
- The Death of Queen Jane 03:27
- Good Old Way 02:52
- Doffing Mistress 01:30
- Blackleg Miner 01:55
- Goodnight Irene 02:31
- Mad Family 01:35
- Dig My Grave 01:05
- Tam Lin 09:59

A Folk Song a Day 5: November 2010

- Spectre Review 05:10
- His Name Is Andrew 05:05
- London Town 02:49
- Spencer the Rover 03:15
- Cob a Coalin 01:59
- South Australia 01:53
- Love at the Five and Dime 04:46
- Boston Harbour 02:05
- Mary Ann 02:48
- A Chat with Your Mother 04:03
- If You Want to See the General 03:09
- Bruton Town 03:36
- Rose of Tralee 03:04
- I'll Go with Him Wherever He Goes 02:41
- See See the Cape's in View 02:39
- Hard Times 02:52
- Unfortunate Lass 03:41
- Cholera Camp 06:09
- I Once Was a Fisherman 02:37
- My Johnny Was a Shoemaker 01:29
- Jacob's Well 03:38
- Poor Fellows 05:04
- Warlike Lads of Russia 03:31
- Fire Marengo 02:44
- Grey Goose and Gander 03:37
- The Hand Weaver and the Factory Maid 02:43
- Sweep Chimney Sweep 02:08
- Farewell to Old Bedford 01:58
- Cold Blows the Wind 03:26
- Brown Girl 03:15

A Folk Song a Day 6: December 2010

- Babes in the Wood 02:46
- Hark Hark 01:53
- Snow Falls 01:52
- While Shepherds Watched (Pentonville) 03:06
- While Shepherds Watched (Sweet Chiming Bells) 02:50
- Come All You Weary Travellers 02:43
- Mistletoe Bough 04:08
- Cells 04:14
- Boar's Head Carol 01:45
- A Roving on a Winter's Night 03:07
- Spout Cottage 02:10
- Poor Little Jesus 02:36
- All Hail the Power of Jesus' Name (Diadem) 02:53
- The Holly & the Ivy 02:23
- Remember O Thou Man 03:30
- Jingle Bells 03:53
- Mount Moriah 02:14
- We Wish You a Merry Christmas 01:51
- Awake Arise Good Christians 02:37
- While Shepherds Watched (Lyngham) 02:38
- Stannington 02:12
- Rudolph the Red Nosed Reindeer 02:09
- The First Noel 02:58
- Shepherds Arise 03:31
- On Christmas Day 01:38
- The King 01:31
- O Little Town of Bethlehem 02:21
- Little Pot Stove 04:47
- I'd Like to Tell to You 01:45
- Rocking Me Babies 02:16
- Cornish Wassail Song 05:05

A Folk Song a Day 7: January 2011

- January Man 03:19
- Daddy Fox 02:54
- Old Brown's Daughter 03:36
- Peggy Bann 03:44
- Apple Tree Wassail Song 02:39
- Pilgrim On the Pennine Way 03:49
- Captain Ward 03:21
- Otago 03:39
- Peggy Gordon 02:59
- In the Month of January 02:58
- The Snow It Melts the Soonest 02:25
- Off to Epsom Races 01:45
- Ruins by the Shore 02:54
- Days Gone By 03:00
- Smugglers Song 03:29
- Lowlands 03:17
- Five Hundred Miles 02:20
- Maria's Gone 02:45
- Ballina Whalers 05:03
- The Last Leviathan 02:48
- The Cuckoo 02:47
- John Ball 03:46
- I Drew My Ship 02:24
- Two Magicians 04:07
- Some Tyrant Has Stolen My True Love Away 02:15
- Bungay Roger 02:15
- My Son John 01:28
- Banks of the Nile 03:05
- Anachie Gordon 06:57
- I'll Take You Home Again Kathleen 03:23
- Dark as a Dungeon 02:43

A Folk Song a Day 8: February 2011

- Sheffield Apprentice 04:47
- Won't You Go My Way 01:19
- Clyde Water 04:41
- German Musicianer 03:18
- Cold Blow and the Rainy Night 02:45
- When First I Came to Caledonia 03:35
- King Henry Was King James' Son 01:24
- Queenie 01:35
- Simon John 04:30
- Rolling Down to Rio 01:53
- Hanging Johnny 01:14
- Butter and Cheese and All 03:16
- Don't Go Out Tonight Dear Father 03:36
- Cupid's Garden 03:23
- Young Banker 02:31
- Donkey Riding 01:32
- I Sowed the Seeds of Love 03:14
- Over the Hills and Far Away 03:03
- Bird in the Bush 02:55
- Shoals of Herring 02:59
- Grey Funnel Line 03:06
- A Pilgrims Way 04:21
- Widow's Curse 05:08
- Maid and the Palmer 03:18
- Sir Patrick Spens 04:39
- Fiddlers Green 04:52
- Captain Wedderburn 05:26
- Oor Hamlet 04:21

A Folk Song a Day 9: March 2011

- Lakes of Pontchartrain 03:33
- Four Angels 03:32
- Willie's Lady 05:46
- Worcester City 02:58
- Swansea Barracks 04:36
- Wife of the Soldier 01:36
- Bold Fisherman 04:11
- Sweet Mossom 02:28
- Corduroy 03:03
- Weaver's Daughter 02:22
- Plains of Mexico 02:05
- Farewell Sweet Lovely Nancy 01:40
- Take This Hammer 03:18
- Dalesman's Litany 03:50
- Billy Don't You Weep for Me 03:42
- Springfield Mountain 02:03
- The Green Fields of America 04:09
- Jack Orion 04:08
- Turkey Rhubarb 00:34
- Horn Fair 01:55
- Lovely on the Water 03:03
- Hail a Brighter Day 05:18
- Adam and Eve 00:39
- Scarborough Fair 02:35
- Turtle Dove 02:08
- Tommy 04:01
- Ye Mariners All 01:36
- Whiskey Is the Life of Man 03:33
- Maid on the Shore 04:15
- Juniper, Gentle and Rosemary 04:22
- Lemady 02:31

A Folk Song a Day 10: April 2011

- On One April Morning 02:56
- Rose in April 03:58
- There Once Was a Lover and He Loved a Lass 01:43
- Brave Wolfe 04:00
- The Banks of the Tees 02:29
- Gaol Song 03:04
- The Roman Centurion's Song 04:01
- Amsterdam 04:17
- Palaces of Gold 03:47
- Lord Bateman 03:08
- Payday 02:28
- John Blunt 01:57
- John Barleycorn 03:35
- Gentleman Soldier 02:54
- Copshawholme Fair 04:27
- Seven Yellow Gypsies 05:23
- A Week Before Easter 03:19
- Sister Josephine 03:51
- Bellman 03:44
- Maid in Bedlam 03:55
- Dust to Dust 03:46
- Recruited Collier 02:40
- I Am a Youth That's Inclined to Ramble 02:57
- Pace Egging 04:49
- Sheepshearing 02:04
- I Know My Love By His Way of Talking 02:39
- Geordie 03:34
- New York Mining Disaster 03:19
- Auld Triangle 04:17
- Reynardine 04:12

A Folk Song a Day 11: May 2011

- Hail, Hail the First of May 02:50
- Hal and Tow 02:45
- The Outlandish Knight 05:21
- The Verdant Braes of Skreen 03:00
- Bonny Bunch of Roses 04:44
- Broomfield Hill 04:04
- Death and the Lady 03:12
- Gathering Rushes 05:22
- Down the Moor 05:01
- As I Roved Out 03:41
- Searching for Lambs 03:56
- My Husband's Got No Courage in Him 01:54
- Sweet Nightingale 03:36
- The Gardener 03:07
- Oh What a Beautiful Morning 03:16
- Charming Molly 01:52
- P Stands for Paddy 03:31
- Gypsy Rover 04:23
- Lillibulero 03:17
- Big Rock Candy Mountain 03:08
- Roseville Fair 03:25
- House Carpenter 05:37
- Farewell to the Gold 03:48
- Little Sally Racket 02:02
- Rout of the Blues 02:11
- Banks of the Ohio 04:14
- Birds Upon the Trees 02:33
- Banks of Fordie 06:54
- Icarus 05:29
- Little Musgrave 10:15
- Claudy Banks 03:49

A Folk Song a Day 12: June 2011

- Just as the Tide Was Flowing 04:13
- Beggar Laddie 04:29
- Garden Hymn 02:29
- Streams of Lovely Nancy 02:31
- Let Union Be in All Our Hearts 03:41
- After the Ball 00:43
- Innocent When You Dream 04:04
- Poverty Knock 04:04
- Abe Carman 03:33
- Lock Keeper 03:25
- Ghost Song 04:03
- Exile Song 01:07
- Wild Mountain Thyme 03:25
- Rag Fair 01:58
- Rose of Allendale 04:04
- Farmer's Boy 03:55
- Grand Conversation on Napoleon 04:44
- Plains of Waterloo 03:29
- Roll Alabama 03:52
- Bold Archer 02:55
- Road Through the Woods 02:20
- Banks of Sweet Primroses 03:05
- Fortune Turns the Wheel 04:12
- The Larks They Sang Melodious 04:16
- Farners Toast 03:58
- Young Roger Esquire 01:53
- One Night as I Lay 02:16
- Earl Richard 04:01
- White Cockade 03:15
- Rose in June 07:14

== In popular culture ==
Jon Boden's A Folk Song A Day has inspired other spinoffs, most notably the Australian Folk Song A Day project featuring 367 folk renditions on a daily basis between 26 January 2011 and 26 January 2012 by John Thompson.

Other similar projects include Fifty-Two Folk Songs, Oli Steadman's 365 Days Of Folk, and a A Liverpool Folk Song a Week.

== See also ==
- Music podcast
