= The Works (Spiers and Boden album) =

Studio album by Spiers and Boden
- Released: 11 July 2011
- Recorded: December 2010 – early 2011
- Genre: Folk
- Length: 52:09
- Label: Navigator Records
- Producer: Andy Bell

Spiers and Boden chronology
Vagabond (2008)	The Works (2011)

The Works is the sixth album by folk duo Spiers and Boden. It was made to celebrate 10 years working together. It features re-recorded tracks from their previous albums. The album also features a number of special guests. It peaked at number 32 on the UK Independent Albums Chart.

== Track listing ==
1. "Tom Padget"
2. "Horn Fair"
3. "Gooseberry Bush/Laudanum Bunches"
4. "The Birth of Robin Hood"
5. "The Cheshire Waltz"
6. "Brown Adam"
7. "Rochdale Coconut Dance"
8. "Old Maui"
9. "Haul Away"
10. "Bold Sir Rylas"
11. "Prickle-Eye Bush"

== Personnel ==
Personnel	Instruments	Tracks
Jon Boden	vocals, fiddle, guitar, Stomp Box	All
John Spiers	vocals, melodeon, concertina	All
Nancy Kerr	vocals, fiddle	Tom Padget, Old Maui
James Fagan	vocals, Bouzouki	Tom Padget, Old Maui
Sam Sweeney	Percussion, fiddle	Tom Padget, The Birth of Robin Hood, The Cheshire Waltz, Haul Away
Hannah James	clogging, accordion	Tom Padget, The Birth of Robin Hood
Maddy Prior	vocals	Horn Fair, Bold Sir Rylas
Martin Carthy	guitar	Gooseberry Bush/Laudanum Bunches, Prickle-Eye Bush
Eliza Carthy	vocals, fiddle	The Birth of Robin Hood, Haul Away, Bold Sir Rylas
Andy Cutting	melodeon	The Cheshire Waltz, Bold Sir Rylas
Martin Simpson	guitar	Horn Fair, Brown Adam
Fay Hield	vocals	Old Maui, Haul Away, Bold Sir Rylas, Prickle-Eye Bush
Ian Giles	vocals	Old Maui, Haul Away, Bold Sir Rylas, Prickle-Eye Bush
Peter Coe	vocals	Old Maui, Haul Away, Bold Sir Rylas, Prickle-Eye Bush
David Kosky	Tenor Banjo	Haul Away

== Limited edition ==
500 copies of the album have been made to celebrate their 10th anniversary, these have been available to purchase at some concerts on the 2011 Spring tour. The sleeve notes on the album are written by Colin Irwin, it is not known if regular edition will also contain the same ones.
