= Live at Shepherds Bush Empire (Bellowhead video) =

Video by Bellowhead
- Released: 9 February 2009
- Recorded: Shepherds Bush Empire, London, 26 September 2007
- Genre: Folk
- Length: 1:34:51
- Label: Westpark Music
- Director: Ed Cooper
- Producer: Ed Cooper

Live at Shepherds Bush Empire is a live DVD by folk band Bellowhead, recorded in 2007 on the Burlesque tour and released in 2009.

Recorded on tour for their first album, the performance largely consists of renditions from that debut, but also includes a few rarer tunes from the band's discography like "Haul Away" and an early look at "The Spectre Review" from their sophomore release. The video features all but one of the songs they played at the Shepherds Bush, "One May Morning Early."

The DVD features Bellowhead's tour diary as well as Bellowhead talking about themselves and the formation of the band.

== Track listing ==
1. "Prickle-Eye Bush"
2. "Jack Robinson"
3. "Outlandish Knight"
4. "Across the Line"
5. "London Town"
6. "Haul Away"
7. "Spectre Review"
8. "Rigs of the Time"
9. "If You Will Not Have Me, You May Let Me Go"
10. "Death and the Lady"
11. "Hopkinson's Favourite"
12. "Flash Company"
13. "The Rochdale Coconut Dance"
14. "Fire Marengo"
15. "Sloe Gin"
16. "Jordan"
17. "Frog's Legs and Dragon's Teeth"

== Personnel ==
- Jon Boden - lead vocals, fiddle, tambourine
- John Spiers - melodeon, Anglo-concertina
- Benji Kirkpatrick - guitar, bouzouki, mandolin, tenor banjo
- Andy Mellon - trumpet, flugelhorn
- Justin Thurgur - trombone
- Brendan Kelly - saxophone, bass clarinet
- Gideon Juckes - Helicon, Tuba
- Pete Flood - percussion
- Rachael McShane - cello, fiddle
- Paul Sartin - fiddle, oboe
- Giles Lewin - fiddle, bagpipes
