= Spiers and Boden =

English folk duo

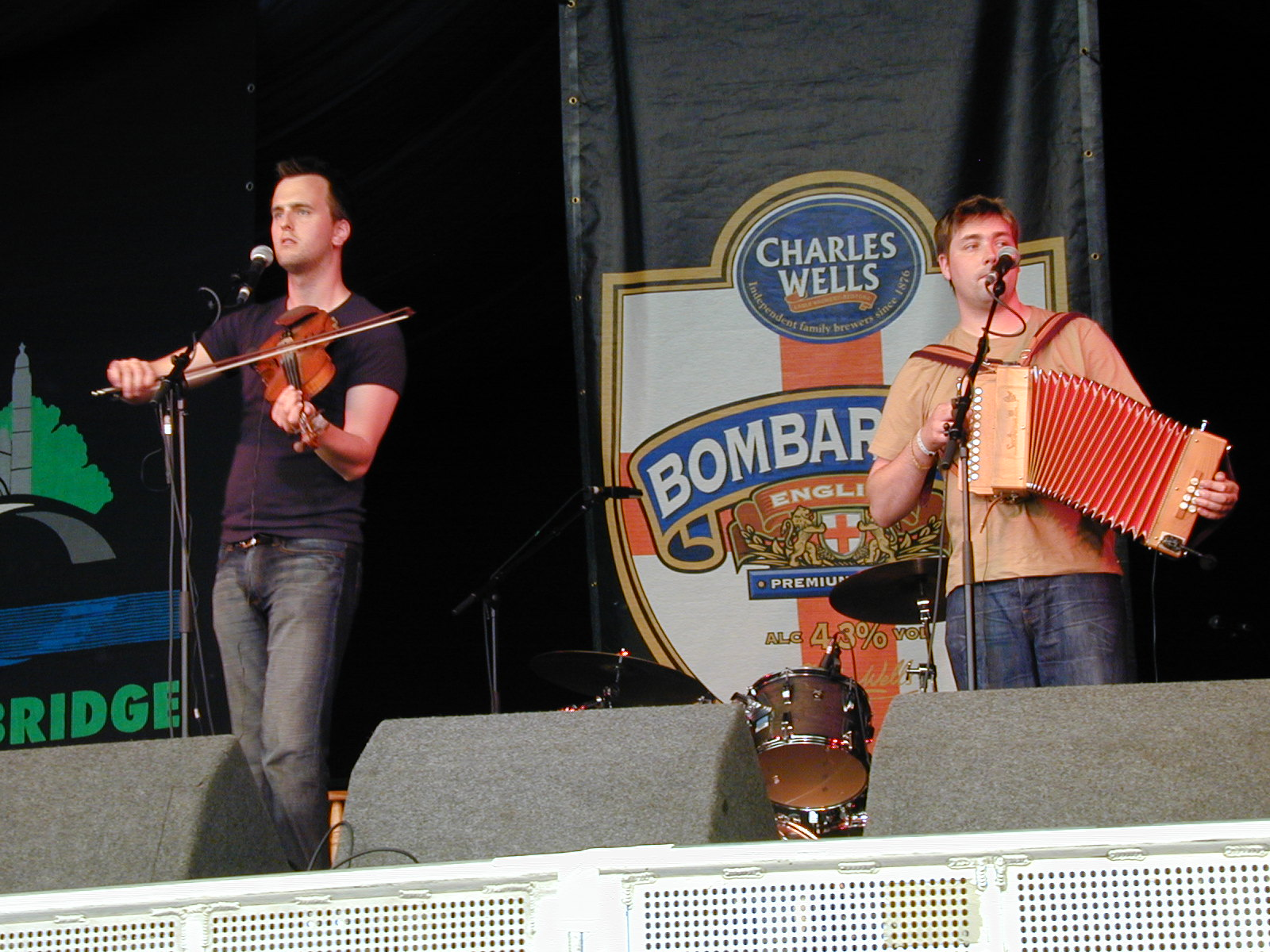
- Spiers and Boden performing in 2003

Background information
- Genres: Folk music
- Instruments: Squeezeboxes, fiddle, guitar, vocals
- Years active: 1999–2014; 2020–present
- Label: Various
- Spinoff of: Bellowhead
- Members: John Spiers, Jon Boden
- Website: www.spiersandboden.com

Spiers and Boden are an English folk duo. John Spiers plays melodeon and concertina, while Jon Boden sings and plays fiddle and guitar while stamping the rhythm on a stomp box. Spiers and Boden were founding members of the folk band Bellowhead.

== Biography ==
They began playing together in 1999 and their first album as a duo was Through & Through (2001). In 2002 they were both session musicians on Eliza Carthy's album Anglicana, and toured with her as part of her band The Ratcatchers. However it was their second album, Bellow, in 2003 that drew significant attention. The tunes and songs were mostly traditional, grounded in the Morris tradition. In the same year they won the "Horizon Award" in the BBC Radio 2 Folk Awards, followed by the "Best Duo" category in 2004. Together they play fiddle, guitar, assorted squeezebox instruments, a stomp box and both sing.

An album called simply Tunes came out in summer 2005 and another, Songs, followed in October of the same year. Their fifth album, Vagabond, was released in 2008.

The Works was released on 11 July 2011. It's an album of re-recorded tracks from their 5 albums made as a duo. The album features a number of special guests, including: Fay Hield, James Fagan, Nancy Kerr, Maddy Prior, Martin Carthy, Martin Simpson and Eliza Carthy.

In October 2013, they announced that their 2014 tour would be their last "for the foreseeable future".

In August 2020, Spiers and Boden announced that they would be playing together as a duo again. They performed for the online Folk On Foot festival.

== Discography ==
=== Spiers and Boden ===
- Through & Through (2001)
- Bellow (2003)
- Tunes (2005)
- Songs (2005)
- Vagabond (2008)
- The Works (2011)
- Fallow Ground (2021)

=== Bellowhead ===
- E.P.Onymous (2004)
- Burlesque (2006)
- Matachin (2008)
- Hedonism (2010)
- Broadside (2012)
- Revival (2014)

=== Eliza Carthy and The Ratcatchers ===
- Anglicana (2002)
- Rough Music (2005)

=== Ian Giles, John Spiers, Jon Boden and Graham Metcalfe ===
- Sea Shanties (2002)

=== Jon Boden, Joey Oliver, John Spiers and Ian Giles ===
- Old Irish Jigs and Reels (2007)

=== Ian Giles, John Spiers, Jon Boden and Giles Lewin ===
- Wassail - A Country Christmas (also released as An English Folk Christmas (2003)
