= Sea Shanties (Spiers and Boden album) =

Studio album by Spiers and Boden
- Released: 2002
- Genre: Folk

Sea Shanties is an album by Ian Giles, Spiers and Boden and Graham Metcalfe.

Most of the tracks are sung as an unaccompanied quartet of male voices. The sound is so thick that there is probably only one microphone. There are two instrumental tracks. This appears to be the first ever recording of the tune "Ashley's Flag", printed about 1800. The album was available at UK tourist centres rather than high street music stores. Recorded and released in 2002.

== Track listing ==
1. Haul away the bowline (Trad)
2. Clear away the track (Trad)
3. Portsmouth/ Bonny Kate (instr) (Trad/Trad)
4. Bully in the alley (Trad)
5. All for me grog (Trad)
6. Ten Thousand Miles Away (Trad)
7. The 24th of February (Trad)
8. The weary whaling ground (Trad)
9. Ashley's hornpipe/ Ashley's flag (instr) (Trad/Trad)
10. Nancy of Yarmouth (Trad)
11. Paddy Doyle's boots (Trad)
12. The bonny ship the Diamond (Trad)
13. The candlelight fisherman (Trad)
14. The gallant frigate Amphitrite (Trad)
15. Go to sea no more (Trad)
16. The Whitby lad (Trad)
17. A sailor's life (Trad)

== Personnel ==
- Ian Giles - vocals and English concertina
- John Spiers - voice and melodeon
- Jon Boden - vocals, guitar and fiddle
- Graham Metcalfe - voice
