= Umbrellowhead =

Studio album by Bellowhead
- Released: 2009
- Genre: Folk
- Label: Navigator Records

Umbrellowhead is a collection of songs from other bands that the eleven members of Bellowhead also play in as well as some solo material from the individual artists. The album opens with one previously unreleased Bellowhead song.

== Track listing ==
1. Bellowhead - Unclothed Nocturnal Manuscript Crisis (Kirkpatrick. Arr. Kirkpatrick, Mellon)
2. Chavo - Ganka’s Song (Gankino) (Trad. Arr. Greswell, Mellon, O’Brien, Ramage)
3. Rachael McShane - The Fisherman (Trad. Arr. McShane, Peacock, Proud, Sinclair)
4. Pete Flood - Master Kilby (Trad. Arr. Flood)
5. Belshazzar’s Feast - Rondo a la Turkey incl. Rondo a la Turka (Mozart. Arr. Sartin, Hutchinson) Turkey In The Straw (Trad. Arr. Sartin, Hutchinson) Yakety Sax (Boots Randolph, James "Q." Spider Rich. Arr. Sartin, Hutchinson)
6. Benji Kirkpatrick - Wallbreaker (Kirkpatrick)
7. Jon Boden - Beating The Bounds (Boden)
8. Setsubun Bean Unit - Gujo Ondo (Trad. Arr. Flood)
9. Justin Thurgur - The Beginning (Thurgur, De Wardener, Khan)
10. Faustus - The New Deserter (Trad. Arr. Kirkpatrick, Sartin, Rose)
11. Hannah James and Sam Sweeney - Gaol Song (Trad. Arr. James, Sweeney)
12. Spiers and Boden - Tom Padget (Trad. Arr. Spiers, Boden)
13. Farmyard Animals Trio - Marunouchi (Kelly) Featuring Pete Flood, Brendan Kelly & Gideon Juckes
14. The Choir Of Christ Church Cathedral, Dublin - Psalm 143 (Sartin. Conducted by Judy Martin)
