= Yarmouth Town =

Traditional English song

"Yarmouth Town" is a traditional English song. It is a shanty about the town of Great Yarmouth on the Norfolk coast. It recounts a story of a young woman, the daughter of a pub landlord, who takes many lovers amongst the sailors passing through the port.

It has been performed by a number of musicians including Peter Bellamy, The Clancy Brothers, Planxty, Gaelic Storm, Great Big Sea, and Bellowhead.

== Cover versions ==
- Peter Bellamy published "Yarmouth Town" on his album Mainly Norfolk (1968)
- Planxty as a B side to "Cliffs of Dooneen" (1972)
- Ryan's Fancy published a live version on their 'Ryan's Fancy Live' LP (1975)
- Great Big Sea on their album Sea of No Cares (2002)
- Bellowhead on their album Hedonism (2010) og Hedonism Live (2011)
- Jon Boden from Bellowhead recorded the song in August 2010 as a part of the project A Folk Song a Day where he recorded and released a folk song each day for one year.
- Nic Jones on his live album Unearthed (2011)
- Gaelic Storm on their album The Boathouse (2013)
- The Merchant Men on their album A'right My Lubbers! (2020)
