= Hedonism Live =

2011 live DVD by Bellowhead

Video by Bellowhead
- Released: 28 November 2011
- Recorded: O2 Academy Bournemouth in May 2011
- Genre: Folk
- Label: Proper Films
- Director: Ed Cooper

Hedonism Live is the second live DVD by folk band Bellowhead. It was recorded in May 2011 at the O2 Academy Bournemouth.

== Track listing ==
1. Yarmouth Town
2. A-Begging I Will Go
3. Trip To Bucharest
4. Amsterdam
5. Whiskey Is The Life of Man
6. Two Magicians
7. Parson's Farewell
8. Cold Blows The Wind
9. Fakenham Fair
10. Cross-Eyed And Chinless
11. Broomfield Hill
12. Unclothed Nocturnal Manuscript Crisis
13. Captain Wedderburn
14. The Handweaver and the Factory Maid
15. Across The Line
16. Roll Her Down The Bay
17. Cholera Camp
18. Haul Away
19. Little Sally Racket
20. Sloe Gin
21. New York Girls
22. London Town
23. Frog's Legs And Dragon's Teeth

== Personnel ==
- Jon Boden – lead vocals, fiddle, tambourine
- John Spiers – melodeon, Anglo-concertina
- Benji Kirkpatrick – guitar, bouzouki, mandolin, tenor banjo
- Andy Mellon – trumpet, flugelhorn
- Justin Thurgur – trombone
- Brendan Kelly – saxophone, bass clarinet
- Ed Neuhauser – Helicon, Tuba
- Pete Flood – percussion
- Rachael McShane – cello, fiddle
- Paul Sartin – fiddle, oboe
- Sam Sweeney – fiddle, bagpipes
