= Broadside (album) =

Studio album by Bellowhead
- Released: 15 October 2012
- Recorded: 2012 at Rockfield Studios
- Genres: English folk, folk jazz, British folk rock
- Length: 46:55
- Label: Navigator Records
- Producer: John Leckie

Bellowhead chronology
Hedonism (2010)	Broadside (2012)	Revival (2014)

Singles from Broadside
- 1. "10,000 Miles Away" Released: 23 September 2012; 2. "Roll The Woodpile Down" Released: 2 February 2013; 3. "Betsy Baker" Released: 15 July 2013

Professional ratings
Review scores
Source	Rating
Contactmusic.com	Extremely favorable
BBC	Generally favourable
The Guardian	4/5 stars
musicOMH	4/5 stars
The Observer	4/5 stars
Songlines	4/5 stars

Broadside is the fourth full album by Bellowhead, released on 15 October 2012.

The album was recorded over several weeks at Rockfield Studios in March 2012. Initially around 25 tracks were arranged for the album, of these 14 tracks were recorded (all of which became commercially available). Like their previous album, Hedonism, it was produced by John Leckie.

All of the tracks, bar one, on Broadside are traditional folk songs, many being written several hundred years ago; they have all been given a new arrangement by the band. The album title refers both to the nautical meaning of firepower and to broadside ballads, an early form of printed song.

The album entered the UK official album charts at number 16, unprecedented for an independently released folk album. It also went to number 1 in the UK independent album charts.

== Singles ==
The track, "10,000 Miles Away", was released as the lead single in late September and was playlisted on BBC Radio 2 for several weeks in October. In January, the album's second single "Roll the Woodpile Down" (Radio Edit), was also playlisted on the 'A list' for BBC Radio 2, receiving significant airplay. This radio edit was mixed by Pete Craigie (Pet Shop Boys).

== Track listing ==
No.	Title	Writer(s)	Length
1.	"Byker Hill"	Trad/arr Boden	3:26
2.	"Old Dun Cow"	Harry Wincott/arr Boden	4:37
3.	"Roll The Woodpile Down"	Trad/arr Boden	3:03
4.	"10,000 Miles Away"	Trad/arr Boden	3:12
5.	"Betsy Baker"	Trad/arr Flood	4:23
6.	"Black Beetle Pies"	Trad/arr Flood	4:09
7.	"Thousands Or More"	Trad/arr Flood	4:28
8.	"The Dockside Rant/Sailing with the Tide"	Boden/arr Boden	3:20
9.	"The Wife of Usher's Well"	Trad/arr Flood	3:40
10.	"What's The Life of a Man (Any More Than A Leaf?)"	Trad/arr Flood	4:15
11.	"Lillibulero" (Tune and chorus of Lillibullero with main lyrics from The Farmer's Curst Wife)	Trad/arr Boden	3:07
12.	"Go My Way" (Lyrics a mix of the songs 'Won't You Go My Way' and 'Saucy Sailor')	Trad/arr Boden	4:53
Total length:			46:55

Bonus tracks

No.	Title	Writer(s)	Length
13.	"Jolly Bold Robber"	Trad/arr Thurgur	4:14
14.	"Wind & Rain"	Trad/arr Sartin	3:35

Both bonus tracks appear on the iTunes 'bonus track edition'. "Wind & Rain" also appears on the single 10,000 Miles Away.

== Personnel ==
- Jon Boden – lead vocals, fiddle
- Benji Kirkpatrick – guitars, bouzouki, mandolin, banjo, vocals
- John Spiers – melodeon, Anglo-concertina, Claviola, vocals
- Andy Mellon – trumpet, vocals
- Justin Thurgur – trombone, vocals
- Brendan Kelly – saxophone, bass clarinet, vocals
- Ed Neuhauser – Helicon, Tuba, vocals
- Pete Flood – percussion, vocals
- Rachael McShane – cello, fiddle, vocals
- Paul Sartin – fiddle, oboe, vocals
- Sam Sweeney – fiddle, English bagpipes, vocals

== Charts ==
Chart performance for Broadside
Chart (2012)	Peak position
Scottish Albums (Official Charts)	48
UK Albums (Official Charts)	16
UK Album Downloads (Official Charts)	30
UK Independent Albums (Official Charts)	1

== Certifications ==
Certifications for Broadside
Region	Certification	Certified units/sales
United Kingdom (BPI)	Silver	60,000^{*}
^{‡} Sales+streaming figures based on certification alone.
