= Bellowhead =

English folk band

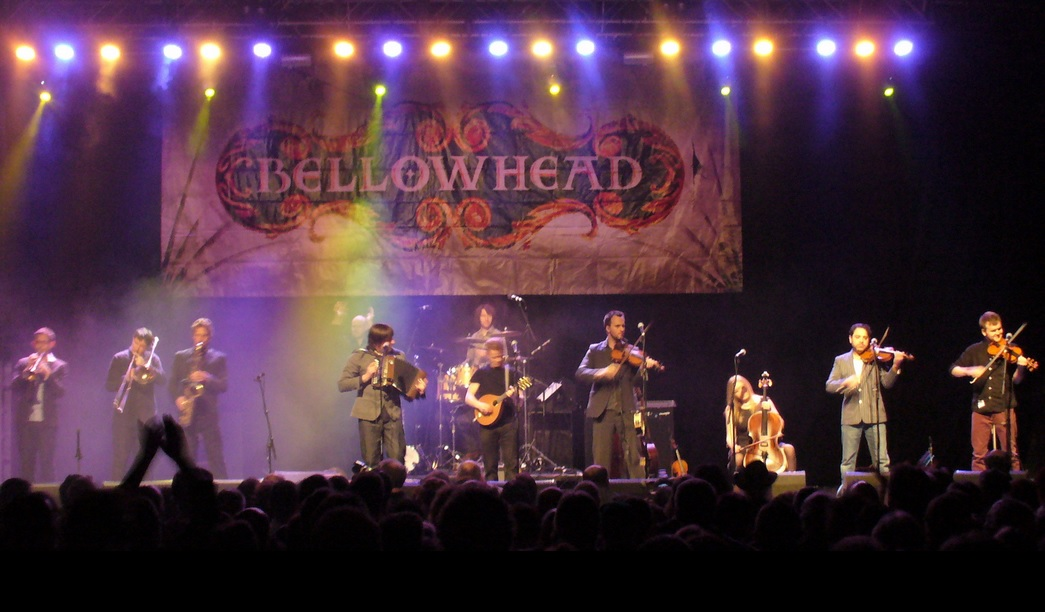
- Bellowhead live at 2013 Celtic Connections

Background information
- Genres: English folk; folk jazz; British folk rock; progressive folk
- Years active: 2004–2016, 2020, 2022 , 2024
- Labels: Island; Navigator; Westpark
- Past members: John Spiers; Jon Boden; Benji Kirkpatrick; Paul Sartin; Rachael McShane; Ed Neuhauser; Pete Flood; Andy Mellon; Brendan Kelly; Justin Thurgur; Sam Sweeney; Giles Lewin; Gideon Juckes
- Website: www.bellowhead.co.uk

Bellowhead is an English contemporary folk band, active from 2004 to 2016, reforming in 2020. The eleven-piece act played traditional dance tunes, folk songs and shanties, with arrangements drawing inspiration from a wide range of musical styles and influences. The band included percussion and a four-piece brass section. Bellowhead's bandmembers played more than 20 instruments among them, whilst all performers provided vocals.

The band parted after their final gig at Oxford Town Hall in May 2016. In 2020, the band reformed for a reunion concert and played reunion tours in 2022, 2024 and 2026.

== History ==
=== Early years and Burlesque: 2004–2007 ===
The idea for the band came to Spiers and Boden while the duo were in a traffic jam on tour. The longer they sat in traffic, the more friends they thought to invite to join. This led to the formation of a ten-piece band, with Benji Kirkpatrick, Rachael McShane, Paul Sartin, Pete Flood, Brendan Kelly, Justin Thurgur, Andy Mellon and Giles Lewin completing the initial line-up. Before they had time to rehearse, the fledgling band were invited to play the first Oxford Folk Festival in April 2004. In 2004, the band independently released a five-track EP, publicised as "English World Music", called E.P.Onymous. In 2006 Gideon Juckes joined the band, primarily playing the tuba, and they released their first full-length album, Burlesque, featuring material from the Napoleonic Wars, the American minstrel movement and sea-shanties from Brazil. Towards the end of 2007 they became Artists in Residence at the Southbank Centre, making their inaugural appearance with a Christmas Revels event.

=== Matachin: 2008–2009 ===
In 2008 Bellowhead released their second album Matachin, and a live performance at the Proms followed, which was broadcast live on BBC Four and BBC Radio 3. Sam Sweeney joined the band on fiddles and bagpipes following the departure of Giles Lewin. The following year in August the band were approached about recording music for a 20th anniversary episode of The Simpsons.

=== Hedonism: 2010–2011 ===
In 2010, Ed Neuhauser replaced Gideon Juckes on helicon and sousaphone. In October 2010, Bellowhead released their third studio album, Hedonism, which had been recorded in Abbey Road Studios. The album was produced by John Leckie. In honour of the new album, the band developed a new ale also named "Hedonism", with several band members being involved in the brewing process.

Broadcast from April 2011, The Archers spin-off Ambridge Extra featured a revised version of Archers theme tune "Barwick Green", arranged and performed by Bellowhead.

In May 2011, at the 02 Academy in Bournemouth, the band recorded a DVD, Hedonism Live, which was released in late November.

=== Broadside: 2012–2013 ===
The band recorded a new album, Broadside, in March 2012 at Rockfield Studios with John Leckie which was released mid-October 2012. The album went straight to number 16 in the UK official album charts and number 1 in the UK independent album charts. In early 2012 the band undertook a European tour and in November 2012 toured the UK. In early 2013 the band toured the UK, the Netherlands and Belgium.

In October 2013 they recorded a jingle for the BBC Radio 2 folk music show The Folk Show with Mark Radcliffe. During 2013 they recorded a double A-sided single, Christmas Bells / Jingle Bells which was released on 1 December in digital-only format.

=== Tenth anniversary, Revival, and split: 2014–2016 ===
In 2014 the band acknowledged ten years performing together with two 'Bel10whead' performances in April: Bridgewater Hall and the Royal Albert Hall. A new studio album, Revival, followed, released on 30 June 2014 by Island Records. Bellowhead headlined the concert in July 2015 for the opening of the refurbished Cardigan Castle.

In 2016, the band announced their intention to split following a decision by Jon Boden to step down as frontman. Bellowhead played their final gig at Oxford Town Hall, also the venue for their first concert twelve years earlier, on 1 May 2016.

=== Reunions and occasional work, 2020-present ===
In 2020, after four years of absence, the band announced a one-off reunion concert to be streamed on 5 December 2020, for the 10th anniversary of Hedonism. Two years later, they reunited again for a nationwide tour in November 2022 celebrating the 10th anniversary of Broadside. Prior to the tour beginning, band member Paul Sartin died suddenly of a heart attack on 14 September 2022 at the age of 51. However, the tour was continued despite his death, and at multiple shows the band performed Faustus song "Brisk Lad" in memory of Sartin.

Bellowhead provided an upbeat version of the folksong "Just as the Tide Was Flowing" as the opening theme for the BBC/Britbox police procedural series Beyond Paradise, a spinoff from Death in Paradise that premiered in 2023. They also appeared, and performed in, the Beyond Paradise 2023 and 2025 Christmas Specials.

In November 2024 the band toured again to celebrate 20 years since the band formed.

== Band members ==
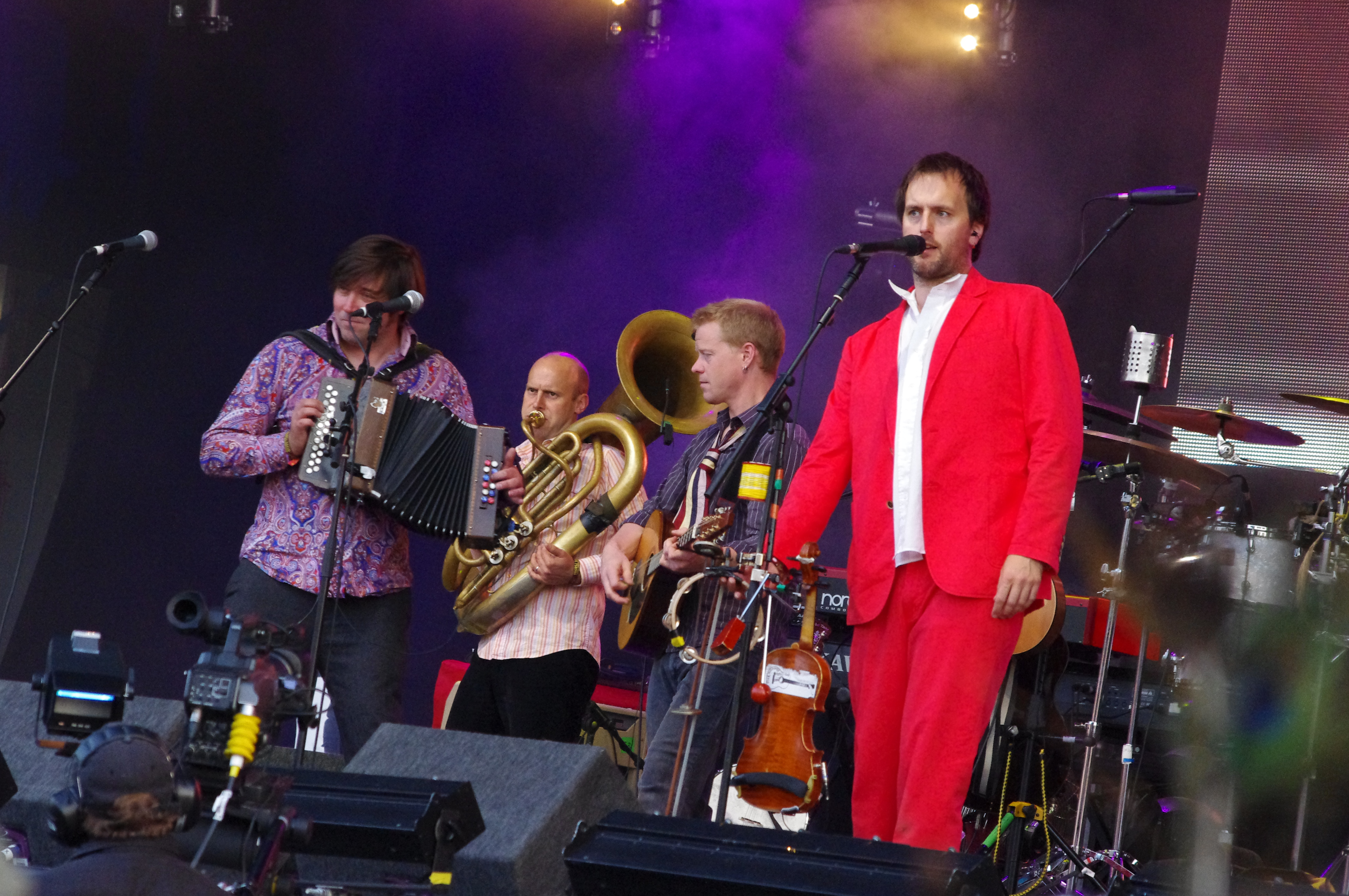
From left to right: John Spiers, Ed Neuhauser, Benji Kirkpatrick, Jon Boden.

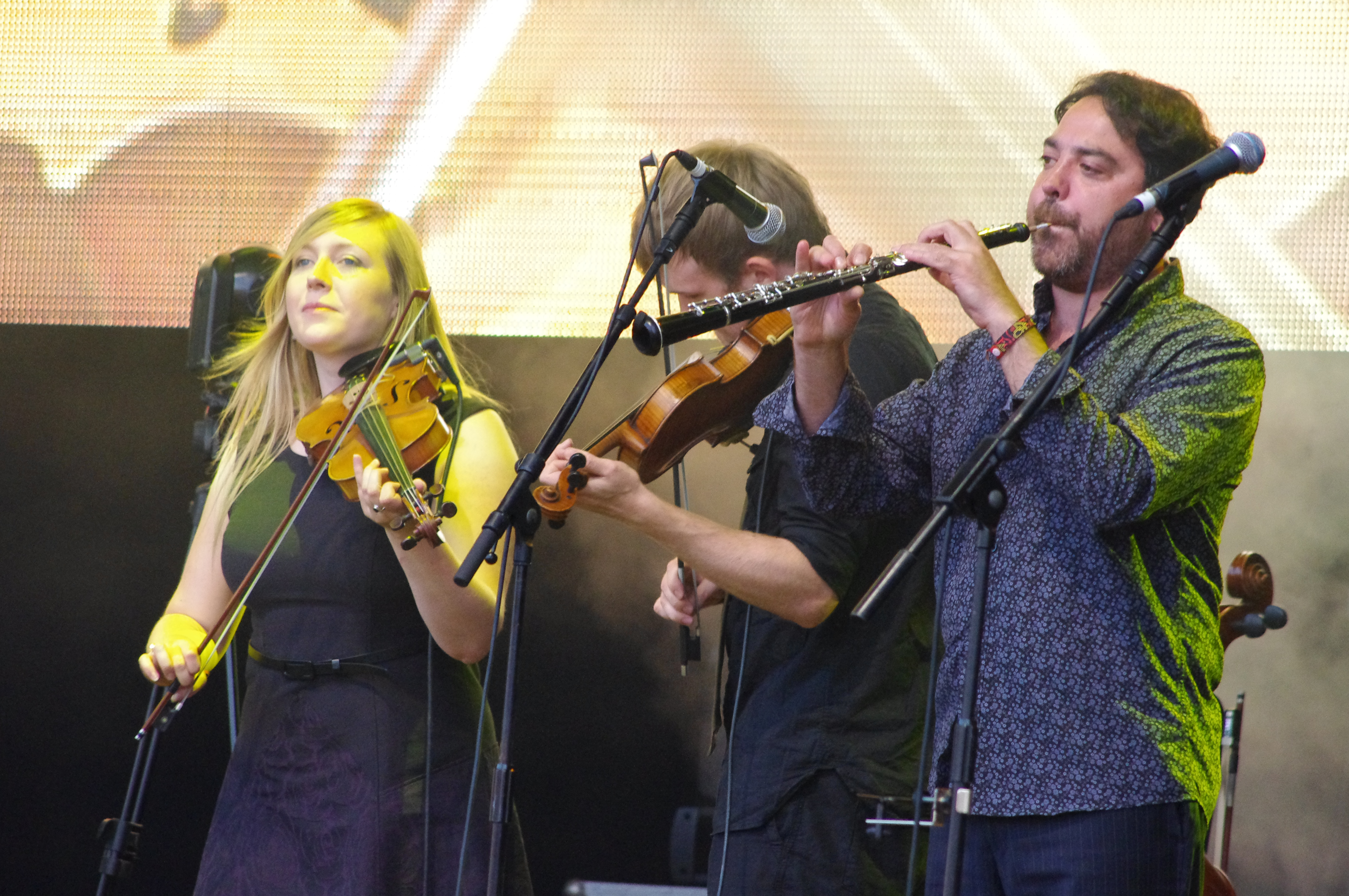
From left to right: Rachael McShane, Sam Sweeney, Paul Sartin.

- Jon Boden – lead vocals, fiddle, tambourine, shaky egg, thunder tube, kazoo, tin whistle
- John Spiers – melodeons, Anglo concertina, Claviola, kazoo, vocals, tambourine
- Benji Kirkpatrick – guitar, bouzouki, mandolin, tenor banjo, vocals, kazoo
- Rachael McShane – cello, fiddle, kazoo, vocals
- Paul Sartin (2004-2022) – fiddle, oboe, slide whistle, kazoo, vocals
- Giles Lewin (2004–2008) – fiddle, bagpipes
- Sam Sweeney – fiddle, English bagpipes, kazoo, vocals, whistle
- Pete Flood – percussion (including frying pan, glockenspiel, knives and forks, clockwork toys, megaphone scratching, stomp box, coal scuttle, party blowers, broomsticks, ratchet, Casio VL-tone, shakers and tambourine), vocals
- Gideon Juckes (2006–2010) – sousaphone, helicon, tuba
- Ed Neuhauser (2010-2025) – sousaphone, helicon, tuba, vocals
- Brendan Kelly – saxophone, bass clarinet, vocals
- Justin Thurgur – trombone, vocals
- Nick Etwell (2020 - Reassembled) - trumpet
- Andy Mellon – trumpet, vocals
- Sally Hawkins (touring 2022, 2024) – fiddle, oboe, vocals
- Jim Bulger (touring 2022, 2024) – trumpet
- Lewis Chinn (touring 2026) - sousaphone

== Discography ==
=== Studio albums ===
Year	Album details	Peak chart positions	Certifications (sales thresholds)
Year	Album details	UK	Certifications (sales thresholds)
2006	Burlesque: Released: 2006; Label: Westpark	—	
2008	Matachin: Released: 22 September 2008; Label: Navigator	73	
2010	Hedonism: Released: 4 October 2010; Label: Navigator	57	BPI: Silver
2012	Broadside: Released: 15 October 2012; Label: Navigator	16	BPI: Silver
2014	Revival: Released: 30 June 2014; Label: Island	12	

=== Live albums ===
- Bellowhead Live: The Farewell Tour (2016)
- Reassembled (2021)

=== Singles ===
- "New York Girls" (2010)
- "Cold Blows the Wind" (2010)
- "10,000 Miles Away" (2012)
- "Roll the Woodpile Down" (2013)
- "Betsy Baker" (2013)
- "Christmas Bells / Jingle Bells" (2013)
- "Gosport Nancy" (2014)
- "Let Her Run / I Want to See the Bright Lights Tonight" (2014)
- "Roll Alabama" (2015)

=== Extended plays ===
- E.P.Onymous (2004)

=== DVDs ===
- Live at Shepherds Bush Empire (2009)
- Hedonism Live (November, 2011)
- Bellowhead Live: The Farewell Tour (2016)

=== Other works ===
- Umbrellowhead (2009)
- Pandemonium – The Essential Bellowhead (2015)

== Awards and nominations ==
=== At BBC Radio 2 Folk Awards ===
The BBC Radio 2 Folk Awards are an annual awards ceremony for folk artists that year. During their 12 years together, Bellowhead won eight of these awards, including Best Live Act on five occasions.

Year	Nominee / work	Award	Result
2014	Bellowhead	Best Group	Nominated
2013	Bellowhead	Best Group	Nominated
2013	Broadside	Best Album	Won
2012	Bellowhead	Best Group	Nominated
2012	Bellowhead	Best Live Act	Nominated
2011
2011	Bellowhead	Best Group	Won
2011	Bellowhead	Best Live Act	Won
2011	Hedonism	Best Album	Nominated
2011	New York Girls	Best Traditional Track	Nominated
2010	Bellowhead	Best Group	Nominated
2010	Bellowhead	Best Live Act	Won
2009
2009	Bellowhead	Best Group	Nominated
2009	Bellowhead	Best Live Act	Nominated
2009	Fakenham Fair	Best Traditional Track	Nominated
2008	Bellowhead	Best Group	Nominated
2008	Bellowhead	Best Live Act	Won
2007	Bellowhead	Best Group	Won
2007	Bellowhead	Best Live Act	Won
2006	Bellowhead	Best Group	Nominated
2006	Bellowhead	Best Live Act	Nominated
2005	Bellowhead	Best Group	Nominated
2005	Bellowhead	Best Live Act	Won
