= Tunes (album) =

Studio album by Spiers and Boden
- Released: 2005
- Genre: Folk
- Label: Fellside Recordings
- Producer: Jon Boden, John Spires and Ben Ivitsky

Spiers and Boden chronology
Bellow (2003)	Tunes (2005)	Songs (2005)

Tunes is the third album by folk duo Spiers and Boden.

== Track listing ==
No.	Title	Length
1.	"The Sportsman's Hornpipe"	5:02
2.	"Monkey-Cokey"	4:34
3.	"The Old Lancashire Hornpipe/The 3rd Beekeeper"	3:35
4.	"Dee-Light"	4:19
5.	"Flapjack & Firesticks/The Minor Rigged Ship"	3:46
6.	"Stoney Steps Hornpipe"	2:34
7.	"Cuckoo's Nest"	3:48
8.	"Cheshire Waltz"	4:27
9.	"Fireside Polka/Rampant"	2:59
10.	"Union"	3:09
11.	"Dearest Dickie"	2:51
12.	"Blow The Winds"	4:43
13.	"The Shropshire Miner"	1:55
14.	"Trunkles"	3:01
15.	"Sportsman's Hornpipe (Slight Return)"	1:30

== Personnel ==
- Jon Boden (vocals, fiddle)
- John Spiers (vocals, melodeons, concertina).
