= Vagabond (Spiers and Boden album) =

2008 studio album by Spiers and Boden

Studio album by Spiers and Boden
- Released: 2008
- Genre: Folk
- Length: 46:42
- Label: Navigator Records

Spiers and Boden chronology
Songs (2005)	Vagabond (2008)	The Works (2011)

Vagabond is the fifth album by folk duo Spiers and Boden.

== Track listing ==
No.	Title	Length
1.	"Tom Padget"	5:32
2.	"The Birth of Robin Hood"	5:29
3.	"Three Tunes"	4:50
4.	"Captain Ward"	4:13
5.	"Beggar Boy"	5:15
6.	"Mary Anne"	3:50
7.	"Speed the Plough / The Princess Royal"	5:06
8.	"Rambling Robin"	3:11
9.	"Gentlewoman"	4:01
10.	"The Rain it Rains"	3:59
11.	"Vignette" (Based on the music from Tom Padget)	1:20
Total length:		46:42

== Personnel ==
- Jon Boden (vocals, fiddle, guitar, stomp box)
- John Spiers (vocals, melodeons, concertina).
