= Live at Shepherds Bush Empire =

Live at Shepherds Bush Empire may refer to:

- Live at Shepherds Bush Empire (album), a 2004 album by Gary Numan
- Live at Shepherds Bush Empire (EP), a 2007 EP by The Rifles
- Live at Shepherds Bush Empire (Bellowhead video), 2009
- Live at Shepherds Bush Empire (Björk video), 2001
- Live at the Shepherds Bush Empire, a 1999 album by Ezio
- Live at Shepherd's Bush (Stephen Stills album), 2009
- Live! At Shepherd's Bush, London, a 2011 video album by Europe
