= E.P.Onymous =

Album by Bellowhead

EP by Bellowhead
- Released: 2004
- Genre: Folk
- Length: 25:30
- Label: Westpark

Bellowhead chronology
E.P.Onymous	Burlesque

E.P.Onymous is the debut EP by Bellowhead.

== Track listing ==
No.	Title	Length
1.	"Rambling Sailor"	5:13
2.	"Jack Robinson"	6:02
3.	"Copshawholme Fair"	5:00
4.	"Rochdale Coconut Dance"	4:04
5.	"Prickle-eye Bush"	5:07
Total length:		25:30

== Personnel ==
- Jon Boden – vocals, fiddle, bagpipes
- John Spiers – melodeon, vocals
- Benji Kirkpatrick – mandolin, bouzouki, guitar, banjo
- Andy Mellon – trumpet
- Justin Thurgur – trombone
- Brendan Kelly – saxophones
- Pete Flood – percussion, cutlery
- Rachael McShane – cello, vocals
- Paul Sartin – fiddle, oboe
- Giles Lewin – fiddle, bagpipes
