= Henry Beaufort (disambiguation) =

Henry Beaufort (died 1447) was an English clergyman.

Henry Beaufort may also refer to:

- Henry Beaufort, 2nd Earl of Somerset (1401–1418)
- Henry Beaufort, 3rd Duke of Somerset (1436–1464), Lancastrian commander during the Wars of the Roses
- Henry Beaufort School, Winchester, England
