= Revival (Bellowhead album) =

Studio album by Bellowhead
- Released: 30 June 2014
- Genre: English folk, folk jazz, British folk rock
- Label: Island
- Producer: Rupert Christie

Bellowhead chronology
Broadside (2012)	Revival (2014)

Singles from Revival
- 1. "Gosport Nancy" Released: 16 June 2014; 2. "Let Her Run / I Want To See The Bright Lights Tonight" Released: 22 September 2014; 3. "Roll Alabama" Released: 20 April 2015

Revival is the fifth studio album by Bellowhead. It was announced at their 10th anniversary concerts in Manchester and London.

The album consists mainly of traditional folk songs and sea shanties. Unusually for the band, the album includes a cover: "I Want to See the Bright Lights Tonight" (Richard and Linda Thompson).

== Track listing ==
No.	Title	Writer(s)	Length
1.	"Let Her Run" (version of the shanty, 'Let The Bulgine Run')	Trad/arr Boden	3:06
2.	"Roll Alabama"	Trad/arr Boden	3:51
3.	"Fine Sally" (version of 'The Sailor from Dover')	Trad/arr Flood	3:32
4.	"Let Union Be"	Trad/arr Boden	3:24
5.	"Moon Kittens" (based on the nursery rhyme, 'We're All in the Dumps')	Trad/arr Flood	3:24
6.	"Rosemary Lane" (variant of Scarborough Fair)	Trad/arr Flood	3:38
7.	"Gosport Nancy"	Trad/arr Boden	3:21
8.	"I Want to See the Bright Lights Tonight"	Richard Thompson/arr Boden	3:24
9.	"Seeds Of Love"	Trad/arr Boden	4:26
10.	"Jack Lintel" (instrumental)	Trad/arr Sweeney	4:21
11.	"Greenwood Side"	Trad/arr Boden	6:15
Total length:			42:45

Deluxe edition (CD 2)

No.	Title	Writer(s)	Length
1.	"Lovely Joan (Home demo)"	Trad/arr Kirkpatrick	3:42
2.	"Three Drunken Maidens (Home demo)"	Trad/arr Spiers	3:05
3.	"Josephine (Home demo)" (previously recorded on Boden's solo album, Painted Lady)	Boden/arr Mellon	3:53
4.	"Rake"	Townes Van Zandt/arr Flood	3:57
5.	"Salisbury Plain (Home demo)"	Trad/arr Thurgur	4:08
6.	"Leviathan (Home demo)" (instrumental)	Boden	4:03
7.	"Long Time on the Ocean (Home demo)"	Trad/arr Kirkpatrick & Mellon	3:13
8.	"Roseville Fair"	Bill Staines/arr Boden	3:42
9.	"Proper Swell"	Lyrics: Lal Wood, Music: Richard Scollins/arr Boden	5:21
Total length:			35:06

== Personnel ==
- Jon Boden – lead vocals, fiddle, tambourine
- Pete Flood – percussion
- Brendan Kelly – saxophone, bass clarinet
- Benji Kirkpatrick – guitars, bouzouki, mandolin, banjo, vocals
- Rachael McShane – cello, fiddle, vocals
- Andy Mellon – trumpet
- Ed Neuhauser – tuba, helicon
- Paul Sartin – fiddle, oboe, vocals
- John Spiers – melodeon, anglo-concertina
- Sam Sweeney – fiddle, vocals
- Justin Thurgur – trombone
