= Some Tyrant Has Stolen My True Love Away =

English folk song

Song
- Genre: English folk song

"My True Love Is Lost" (also known as "Some Rival", "Some Tyrant Has Stolen My True Love Away", and "The Americans Have Stolen My True Love Away") is an English folk song, which has been recorded by Etchingham Steam Band, Steeleye Span, and Olivia Chaney.

Being a well-documented song publicised by EFDSS, and Mainly Norfolk, the song was recorded by Jon Boden and Oli Steadman for inclusion in their respective lists of daily folk songs "A Folk Song a Day" and "365 Days of Folk".
