= J. B. Geoghegan =

English singer-songwriter (1815–1889)

Joseph Bryan Geoghegan
- Born: April 13, 1815; Barton upon Irwell, England
- Died: 21 January 1889 (aged 73); Bolton, England
- Occupations: Music hall entertainer, songwriter, and manager
- Years active: 1843–1889
- Notable work: Ten Thousand Miles Away, Cockles & Mussels, Johnny I Hardly Knew Ye, Down in a Coal Mine
- Spouses: Elizabeth Hopwood (m. 1833; died 1871) Mary Ann Birchall (m. 1871–1889)
- Children: 20
- Parents: James Geoghegan (father); Mary Ann (mother)

Joseph Bryan (Jack) Geoghegan (13 April 1815 – 21 January 1889), was an English music hall song writer and performer. Active from an early age, he was widely known from the 1860s until his death. Geoghegan is credited with many songs, some of which are still performed, such as Ten Thousand Miles Away, Johnny I Hardly Knew Ye, and his version of Cockles & Mussels is the likely source of at least the chorus of what has become the famous Dublin anthem.

== Biography ==
J. B. Geoghegan was born on 13 April 1815 in Barton upon Irwell in the north-west of England. His parents were James Geoghegan, a fustian cutter from Dublin, and Mary Ann from nearby Manchester. Joseph was intended to take up his father's trade but left home to pursue his talent for singing and songwriting, particularly about current events. In 1833 Geoghegan married Elizabeth Hopwood, a vocalist, and together they had nine children. While still married to Elizabeth, he started a second family with Mary Birchall c. 1850 and she was to give birth to eleven children. Geoghegan maintained both families until Elizabeth's death in 1871 after which he married Mary.

Geoghegan's career in entertainment began as a singer and songwriter. By 1843 he was called an "eminent vocalist" of the local Polytechnic Tavern and the following year advertisements for the Star Inn Concert Room in Bolton said he "rendered himself a decided favourite in Bolton by the talent he has displayed in his medleys, parodies and comic songs". While his success eventually led to his managing and owning venues, he continued to write songs. With the rise of music hall, his songs were performed by prominent artistes of the 1860s, '70s and '80s such as Sam Torr, Harry Liston, George Leybourne and J. W. Rowley. While Geoghegan is not known to have travelled to the USA, his songs were performed there, including by well known vaudeville performers like Tony Pastor.

He spent periods with different companies at different locations in Britain including: at the Star Hotel in Liverpool in 1847–1858; possibly in Glasgow in 1859–60; in Sheffield in 1860–64; returning to Bolton from the late 1860s to the 1870s.He owned and managed the Gaiety Hall in Hanley, Stoke-on-Trent. Geoghegan died in 1889.
