= Justin Thurgur =

British trombonist and composer/arranger (born 1974)

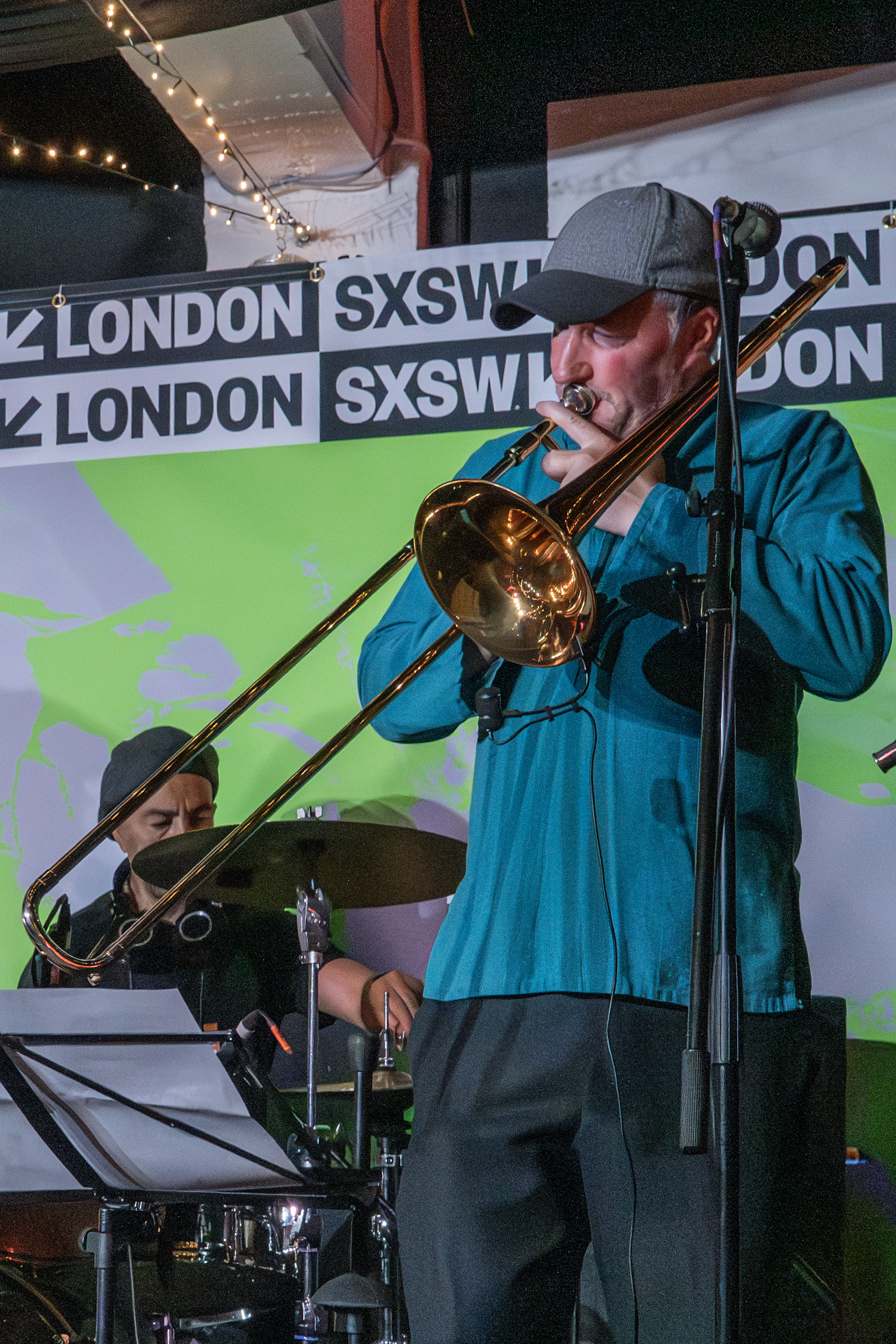
- Performing with Lokkhi Terra at SXSW London, June 2025

Background information
- Born: 1974 (age 50–51)
- Origin: London, England
- Genres: Afrobeat; Afro-Cuban jazz; folk
- Occupations: Trombonist; composer; arranger
- Instruments: Trombone, trumpet

Justin Thurgur (born 1974) is a British trombonist and composer/arranger.

== Biography ==
He is most well known for his work with the English folk group Bellowhead, who he played with from its formation in 2004 until they called it a day in May 2016. Bellowhead were winners of five 'Best Live Act' awards, two 'Best Group' awards and one 'Best Album' award from the BBC Radio 2 Folk Awards. They were Artists in Residence at the South Bank Centre from 2007. In 2014, they signed to Island Records for their fifth full album, 'Revival'.

Thurgur has been collaborating with the pianist and composer Kishon Khan since 1996. Initially Thurgur joined Khan's Afro-Latin Jazz group 'The Bonobo Orchestra', then in 1999 they formed the Cuban-Funk outfit 'Motimba' together. Currently Thurgur is working with Khan in the pianist's Bangla/Latin/Afro/Jazz project 'Lokkhi Terra' and in Thurgur's Afro-Jazz group. His album for this project 'No Confusion' was released in July 2016 on their label 'Funkiwala', which was also officially launched in July.

They have also been working on an album with the Bangladeshi Baul singer Baby Akhtar and on a new project, 'Cubafrobeat', which combines Cuban rhumba with Afro-Beat and features ex-Fela and Femi Kuti pianist/singer Dele Sosimi.

Thurgur appeared on a soundtrack of Khan's for the Bangladeshi movie 'The Last Thakur', for which Khan won a Grand Jury award for 'Best Music' at the South Asian International Film Festival in New York. In 2010 Khan and Thurgur went to Cuba to record an album in Egrem Studios with Indian percussionist Pandit Dinesh and various Cuban artists, including Giraldo Piloto, Julito Padron and Changuito.

Thurgur has been collaborating with Dele Sosimi since 1998, first in the group Gbedu Resurrection and then in Sosimi's Afro-Beat Orchestra. For Sosimi's first two albums and one they did together for the Nigerian poet Ikwunga, Thurgur also acted as co-producer, arranger/composer and recording engineer. Sosimi's fourth album, 'You No Fit Touch Am', was released with Wah Wah 45's in 2015.

As a session player, he has worked with Tony Allen, Africa Express (which specifically included work with Allen, Cheick Tidiane-Seck, and Fatoumata Diowara), Tony Kofi, Bukky Leo, Wara, Inemo, The Soothsayers, Osvaldo Chacon, Roberto Pla, The Selector and The Levellers. He was in the band for the Royal National Theatre production of 'Fela'.

== Discography ==
Solo albums

- 'No Confusion' (Funkiwala, 2016)
- 'Many Faces' (Funkiwala, 2022)

With Lokkhi Terra

- 'No Visa Required' (Funkiwala Records, 2008)
- 'Che Guava's Rickshaw Diaries' (Funkiwala Records, 2011)
- 'London Calling' (Culture Clash Productions, 2012)
- 'Bangla Rasta', with Shickor Bangladesh All-Stars (Funkiwala Records, 2016)
- 'Introducing Baby Akhtar', with Shickor Bangladesh All-Stars (Funkiwala Records, 2017)
- 'Cubafrobeat', with Dele Sosimi (Funkiwala Records, 2018)

With Dele Sosimi

- 'Turbulent Times' (Ekostar Music, 2002)
- 'Calabash', with Ikwunga (Rebisi Hut Records, 2004)
- 'Identity', (Helico Records, 2007)
- 'You No Fit Touch Am', (Wah Wah 45's, 2015)
- 'Dibia' with Ikwunga (Rebisi Hut and Dele Sosimi Music Ltd, 2015)

With Bellowhead

- 'E.P.Onymous' (Megafone Records, 2004)
- 'Burlesque' (Westpark Music, 2006)
- 'Matachin' (Navigator Records, 2008)
- 'Umbrellowhead' (Megafone Records, 2009)
- 'Live at Shepherd's Bush Empire' DVD (Westpark Music, 2009)
- 'Hedonism' (Navigator Records, 2010)
- 'Hedonism Live' DVD (Navigator Records, 2011)
- 'Broadside' (Navigator Records, 2012)
- 'Levellers' Greatest Hits', with The Levellers and Bellowhead on the track 'Just the One' (The Fiddle Recordings, 2014)
- 'Revival' (Island Records, 2014)
- 'Pandemonium – The Essential Bellowhead' (Navigator Records, 2015)
- 'Bellowhead Live: The Farewell Tour’ (Navigator Records, 2016)

Others

- ‘Monkey Vibrations’, with Motimba (Iris Music, 2003)
- ‘Afrobeat Visions’ with Bukky Leo and Black Egypt (Mr Bongo, 2005)
- ‘Afro-Funky Beats’, with Inemo (Black Mango, 2006)
- ‘Leave to Remain’, with Wara (Movimientos Records, 2013)
