= Matachin (album) =

Studio album by Bellowhead
- Released: 22 September 2008
- Genre: English folk
- Length: 51:57
- Label: Navigator Records

Bellowhead chronology
Burlesque (2006)	Matachin (2008)	Hedonism (2010)

Matachin is the second album by Bellowhead, released on 22 September 2008. Its title refers, to 'An old dance with swords, masks and bucklers; a sword dance' that may have influenced the Cotswold Morris dance. It has been described as "...a magnificently murky and rum-sodden collection of 11 traditional and original songs from the 11 piece band who defy easy categorisation".

== Track listing ==
No.	Title	Writer(s)	Length
1.	"Fakenham Fair"	Trad arr. Boden	4:59
2.	"Roll Her Down The Bay"	Trad arr. Flood	3:27
3.	"Vignette I"	Trad arr. Boden, Sweeney, MacShane	0:40
4.	"I Drew My Ship Across The Harbour"	Trad arr. Jon Boden	4:15
5.	"Kafoozalum/The Priest's Miss"	Trad arr. Boden	5:31
6.	"Cholera Camp"	Rudyard Kipling / Peter Bellamy	6:08
7.	"Vignette II"	Trad arr. Boden	0:45
8.	"Whiskey Is The Life Of Man"	Trad arr. Boden	3:22
9.	"Spectre Review"	Words: Zedlitz; Music: trad arr. Flood	5:23
10.	"Widow's Curse"	Trad arr. Flood	5:33
11.	"Bruton Town"	Trad arr. Thurgur	5:33
12.	"Trip to Bucharest / The Flight of the Folk Mutants Parts 1 & 2"	McShane/Boden	5:33
13.	"Vignette III"	Trad arr. Flood	0:48
Total length:			51:57

== Personnel ==
- Jon Boden - lead vocals, fiddle, duet-concertina
- Benji Kirkpatrick - guitar, bouzouki, mandolin, banjo
- John Spiers - melodeon, Anglo-concertina
- Andy Mellon - trumpet
- Justin Thurgur - trombone
- Brendan Kelly - saxophone, bass clarinet
- Gideon Juckes - Helicon
- Pete Flood - percussion
- Rachael McShane - cello, fiddle
- Paul Sartin - fiddle, oboe
- Sam Sweeney - fiddle, pipes

== Charts ==
Chart performance for Matachin
Chart (2008)	Peak position
UK Albums (Official Charts)	73
UK Independent Albums (Official Charts)	9
