= Hedonism (album) =

Studio album by Bellowhead
- Released: 4 October 2010
- Recorded: 2010 at Abbey Road Studios, London
- Genres: English folk, folk jazz, British folk rock
- Length: 48:46
- Label: Navigator Records

Bellowhead chronology
Matachin (2008)	Hedonism (2010)	Broadside (2012)

Professional ratings
Review scores
Source	Rating
Uncut	3/5 stars

Hedonism is the third album by Bellowhead, released on 4 October 2010. It was recorded in Abbey Road Studios and was produced by John Leckie. The band also developed a new ale named after the album. Some of the band members took part in the brewing process.

The album sold 60,000 copies, becoming the best-selling independent folk LP of all time.

== Track listing ==
No.	Title	Writer(s)	Length
1.	"New York Girls"	Trad arr. Boden & Spiers	4:32
2.	"A-Begging I Will Go"	Trad arr. Boden	4:29
3.	"Cross-Eyed and Chinless"	Trad arr. Flood	3:51
4.	"Broomfield Hill"	Trad arr. Boden	5:29
5.	"The Hand Weaver and the Factory Maid"	Trad arr. Flood	4:42
6.	"Captain Wedderburn"	Trad arr. Boden	6:01
7.	"Amsterdam" (Jacques Brel cover)	Jacques Brel / Translation by Mort Shuman / arr. Kelly	4:12
8.	"Cold Blows the Wind"	Trad arr. Flood	4:19
9.	"Parson's Farewell"	Sam Sweeney / Trad arr. Sweeney & Kelly	4:10
10.	"Little Sally Racket"	Trad arr. Boden	3:13
11.	"Yarmouth Town"	Trad arr. Boden	3:50
Total length:			48:46

Bonus track (iTunes exclusive)

No.	Title	Length
12.	"Two Magicians"	3:44

== Personnel ==
- Jon Boden – lead vocals, fiddle, saw
- Benji Kirkpatrick – guitar, bouzouki, mandolin
- John Spiers – melodeon, Anglo-concertina
- Andy Mellon – trumpet
- Justin Thurgur – trombone
- Brendan Kelly – saxophone, bass clarinet
- Ed Neuhauser – Helicon, Tuba
- Pete Flood – percussion
- Rachael McShane – cello, fiddle, backing vocals
- Paul Sartin – fiddle, oboe
- Sam Sweeney – fiddle, pipes

== Charts ==
Chart performance for Hedonism
Chart (2010)	Peak position
UK Albums (Official Charts)	57
UK Album Downloads (Official Charts)	65
UK Independent Albums (Official Charts)	4

== Certifications ==
Certifications for Think Later
Region	Certification	Certified units/sales
United Kingdom (BPI)	Silver	60,000^{^}
^{‡} Sales+streaming figures based on certification alone.
