= Songs from the Floodplain =

Studio album by Jon Boden
- Released: 2 March 2009
- Genre: Folk
- Length: 48:25
- Label: Navigator Records
- Producer: Jon Boden and Keith Angel

Jon Boden chronology
Painted Lady (2006)	''Songs from the Floodplain'' (2009)

Songs from the Floodplain is Jon Boden's second solo album. The folk songs are set in a future, post-apocalyptic United Kingdom.

== Track listing ==
No.	Title	Writer(s)	Length
1.	"We Do What We Can"	Boden	3:54
2.	"Going Down The Wasteland"	Boden	3:12
3.	"Days Gone By"	Boden	3:41
4.	"Penny for the Preacher"	Boden	3:05
5.	"Dancing in the Factory"	Melody Trad., lyrics Boden	3:58
6.	"Beating The Bounds"	Boden	4:31
7.	"The Pilgrims Way"	Boden	2:27
8.	"April Queen"	Boden	3:40
9.	"When The Walls Come Tumbling Down"	Boden	5:09
10.	"Don't Wake Me 'Til Tomorrow"	Boden	5:05
11.	"Under Their Breath"	Boden	4:07
12.	"Has Been Cavalry"	Boden	5:36
Total length:			48:25

== Personnel ==
- Jon Boden (vocals, fiddle, guitars, concertina, double bass, drums, percussion, melodeon, harmonium)
