= Lydie Auvray =

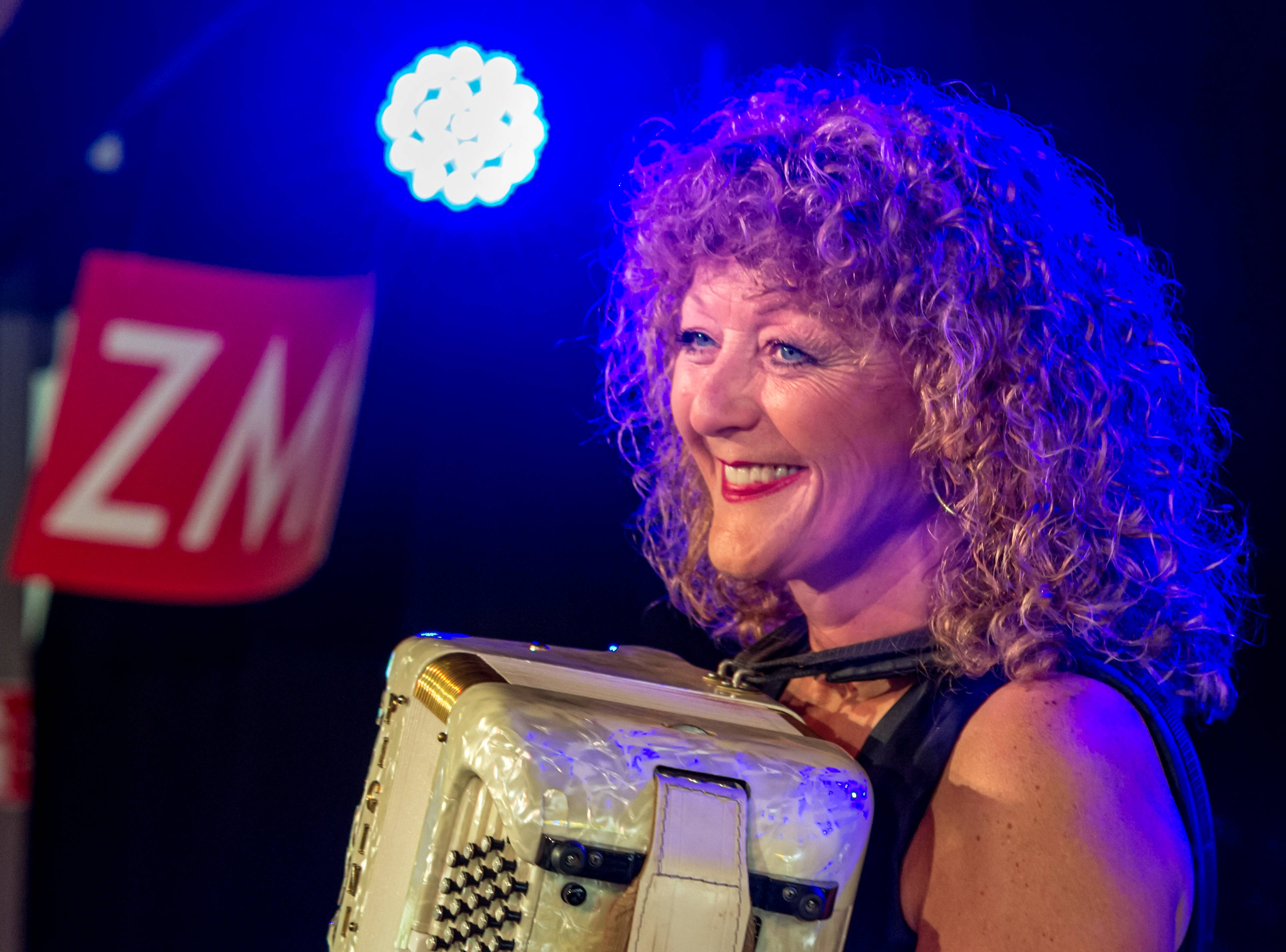
- Lydie Auvray, Zelt Musik Festival 2015 in Freiburg, Germany

Background information
- Born: 1956 (age 69–70); Langrune-sur-Mer, Département Calvados, Normandy, France

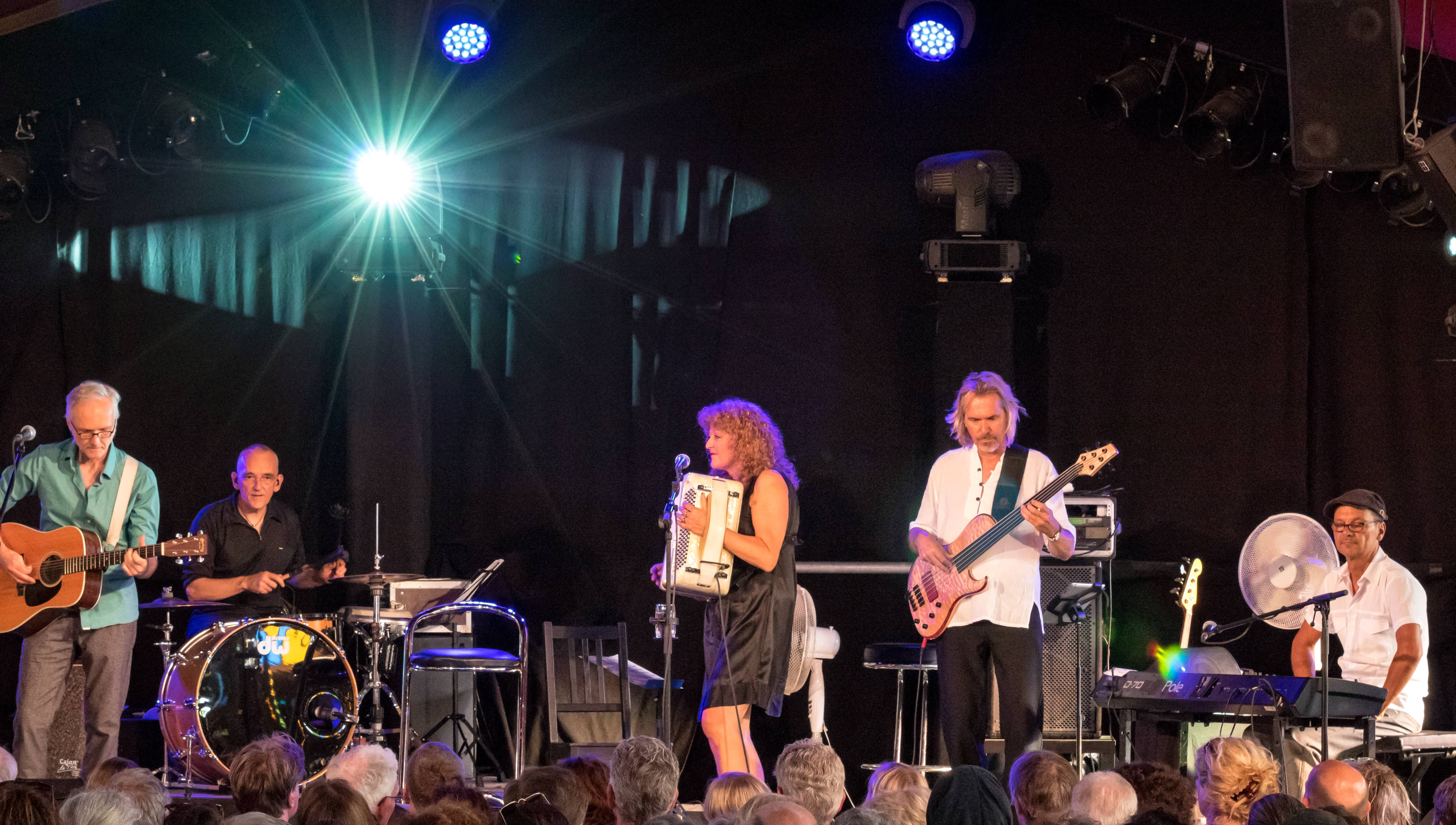
Lydie Auvray, Zelt Musik Festival 2015 in Freiburg, Germany

Lydie Auvray (born 1956 in Langrune-sur-Mer in Département Calvados in Normandy) is a French accordionist, composer and singer. She lives in Cologne.

After finishing school in 1974 she moved to Germany to improve her language skills. She first appeared on stage in Berlin in 1976 and played with folk-singer Jürgen Slopianka. The following year she began touring as an accompanist for various singers in West Germany, including Thommie Bayer and Klaus Hoffmann. With Hoffman she recorded a live double-album, Ein Konzert. From 1980 she began playing and touring with German folk-singer Hannes Wader. In 1982 she founded her own backing group, the Auvrettes.

She recorded several albums in the early 1980s. Her 1987 album, D'accord, was produced by her friend Stefan Stoppok. She then made several trips to Martinique, which influenced her work.

In 2003 she published her autobiography, Jubiläum.

== Select Discography ==
- 1981 - Premiere
- 1983 - Paradiso
- 1985 - Ensemble
- 1987 - D’accord
- 1989 - Live
- 1991 - 3/4
- 1992 - 10 Ans
- 1994 - Tango Terrible
- 1995 - Octavons
- 1997 - Bonjour Soleil with Hubert von Goisern, Haindling, Gerd Köster and the Orchester Pro Arte Düsseldorf
- 1998 - Instrumentals
- 1998 - Best of
- 1999 - En Concert
- 2001 - Triangle, with producer Markus Tiedemann, from 2002 guitarist with the Auvrettes.
- 2003 - Tango Toujours
- 2004 - Pure
- 2006 - Regards
- 2008 - Soiree
- 2009 - Trio
- 2012 - 3 Couleurs

== Filmography ==
- Lydie und ihr Akkordeon, a children's film for television
- Die schnelle Gerdi, ZDF series with Senta Berger
- Mannsbilder, in the German children's series Sendung mit der Maus (1990)
