= Ebernoe Horn Fair =

Coordinates: 51.04309°N 0.61061°W

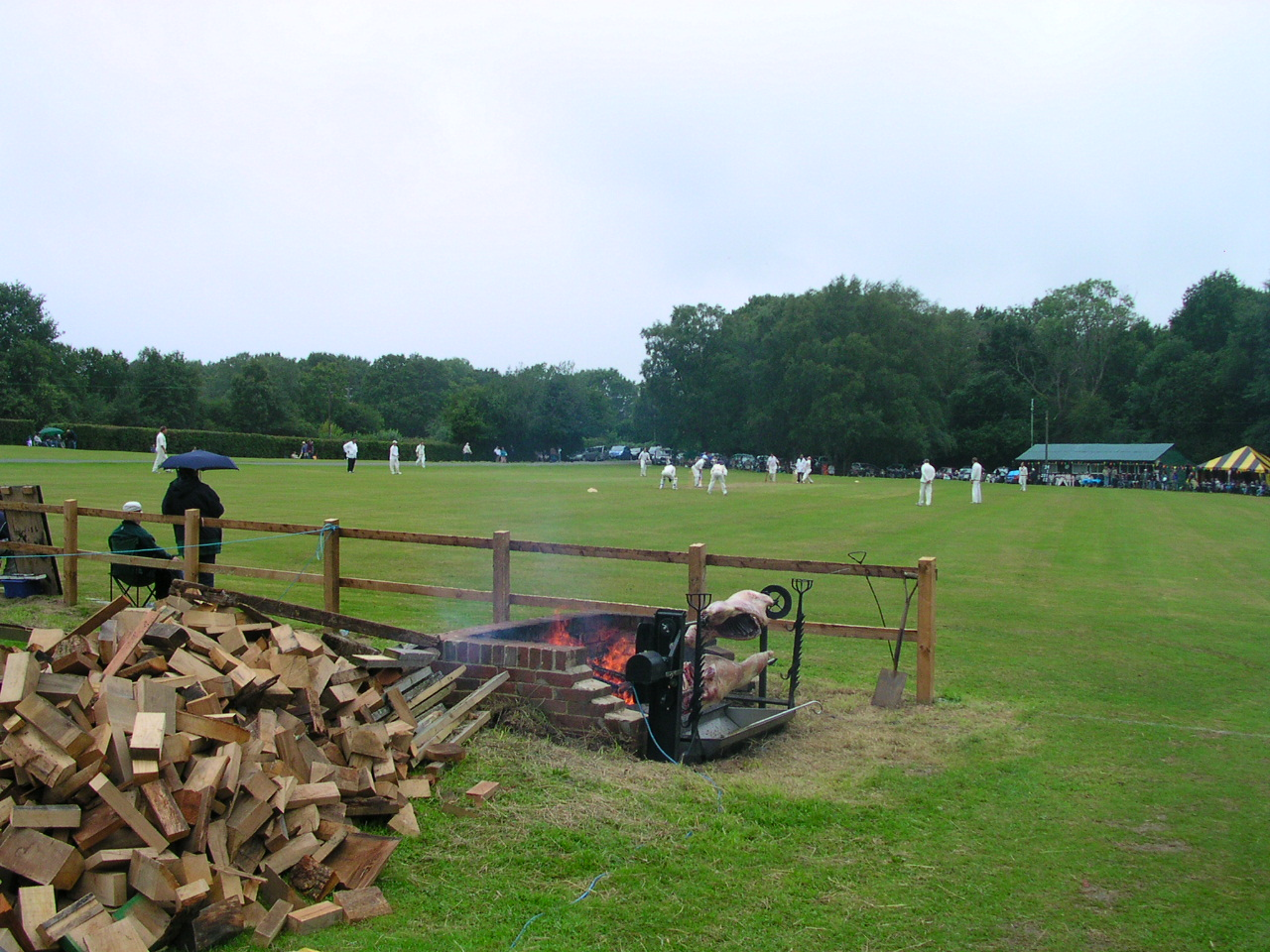
Horn Fair Day 2007; cricket in a steady drizzle.

Ebernoe Horn Fair is held in the small Sussex village of Ebernoe, the location of which is about five miles north of Petworth (grid reference SU975280). The fair is held annually on Saint James's Day, 25 July. The tradition is centuries old though it appears to have been revived in 1864 after a long lapse. The celebration is held on the village common and the main attraction is a cricket match between Ebernoe and a nearby village. Towards the end of the day the highest scoring batsman is presented with a set of horns. These are taken from a sheep which has been roasted during the day. It is thought the presentation of horns is associated with the custom of dressing up with horns as a symbol of cuckoldry (a cuckold is an old English term for a man whose wife has had an adulterous affair. It relates to the cuckoo, a bird which lays its eggs in another bird's nest). Centuries ago horn fairs were boisterous events where cuckoldry and seduction would not be unknown. The practice of dressing up with horns is alluded to in the traditional Horn Fair Song. The old saying All's fair at Horn Fair probably originates from such events. In days gone by it seems that Ebernoe Fair was often beset by thunderstorms. However, the storms were taken as a good luck sign and farmers would look forward to a good harvest. The absence of a storm would suggest the crops would fail. Ebernoe Horn Fair was also the day on which gardeners were reminded to sow their spring cabbages.

There was no fair in 1915–18, 1940–45 and 2020.

== Horn Fair song ==
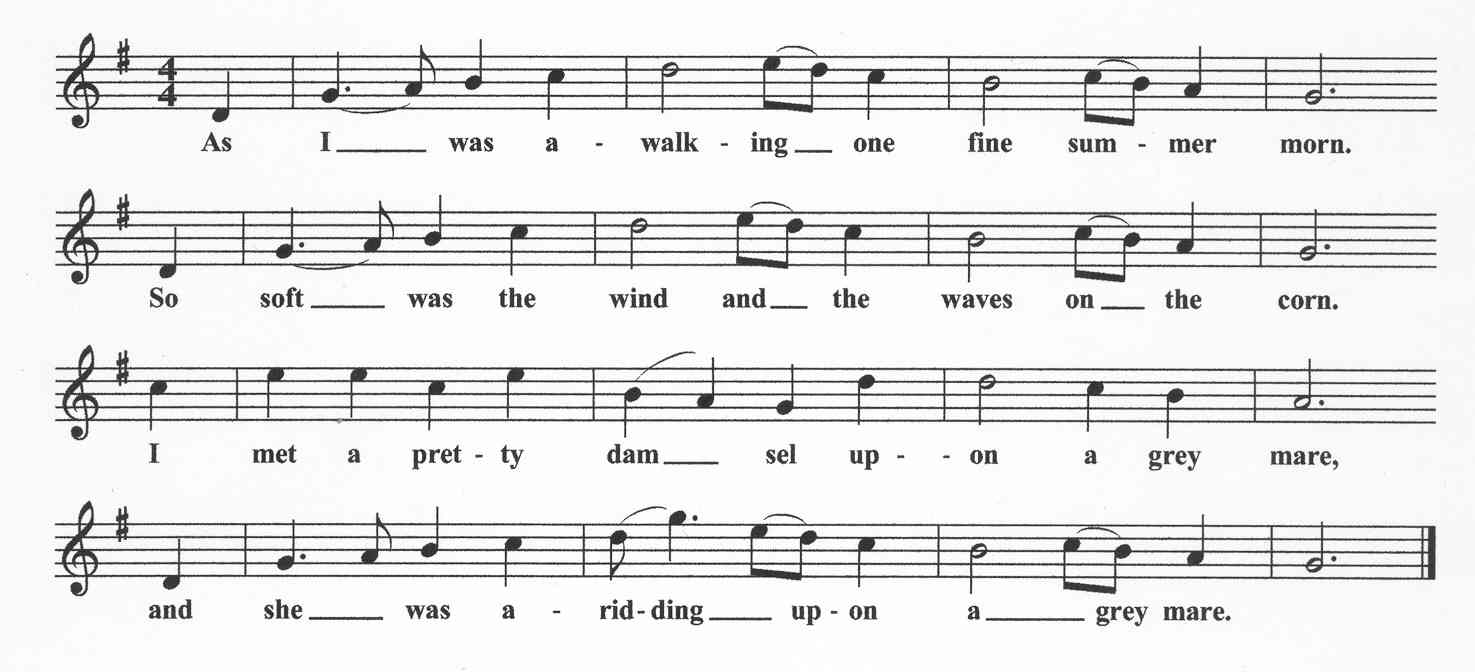

As I was a-walking one fine summer morn,

So soft was the wind and the waves on the corn.

I met a pretty damsel upon a grey mare,

And she was a-riding upon a grey mare.

"Now take me up behind you fair maid for to ride",

"Oh no and then, Oh no, for my mammy she would chide,

And then my dear old daddy would beat me full sore,

And never let me ride on his grey mare no more."

"If you would see Horn Fair you must walk on your way,

I will not let you ride on my grey mare today,

You'd rumple all my muslin and uncurl my hair,

And leave me all distrest to be seen at Horn Fair."

"O fairest of damsels, how can you say No?

With you I do intend to Horn Fair for to go,

We'll join the best of company when we do get there,

With horns on their heads, boys, the finest at the Fair.

They are the finest horns you did ever behold,

They are the finest horns and are gilded with gold.

So merrily, right merrily, to Horn Fair we did go,

A jolly brisk couple boys, and all in a row."

This song also seems to have been used at a Horn Fair at Charlton in Kent which, after a history dating at least from the 16th century, died out in 1872. In 1951 Mr Morrish of Great Allfields Farm, Balls Cross reintroduced the song. Mr Tom Stemp, then aged 75, said he could well remember it being sung by an old Ebernoe woodman, David Baker, who died in 1943 at the age of eighty. The folk duo Spiers and Boden also sing this version of the song.
