= Claviola =

Musical instrument designed by Ernst Zacharias

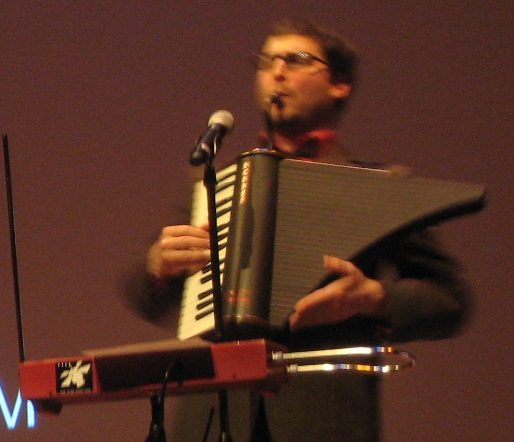
A claviola

The Claviola is a musical instrument that was designed in the 1960s by Hohner technician and designer Ernst Zacharias (inventor of the Pianet and Clavinet). The instrument was produced for a few months in the late 1990s before being discontinued.

Similar to a melodica (which is still in production), but worn like an accordion and played like a bagpipe, the claviola has a set of piano keys on the right side that range 2½ octaves. The left side is a set of pipes that range in length depending on the corresponding pitch.

In combination with the pipes, the claviola uses reeds blown from the "wrong" side compared to reeds in most Western free-reed instruments, resulting in a much mellower, less reedy tone, and pitch dependent on the pipe length. The player can use their left hand to shade or cover the pipe openings, to bend notes or add vibrato.

The Hohner Claviola is best known for its use by the band One Ring Zero and the jazz/folk musician Misha Alperin (Moscow Art Trio). Other musicians who use the Hohner Claviola include John Medeski, Rob Burger, Michael Hearst, and John Spiers.

The trademark "Claviola" was registered by the German piano maker F. Stichel in Leipzig in March 1904 for one type of their self-playing pianos which was made until about 1930.
