= Child Maurice =

Traditional song

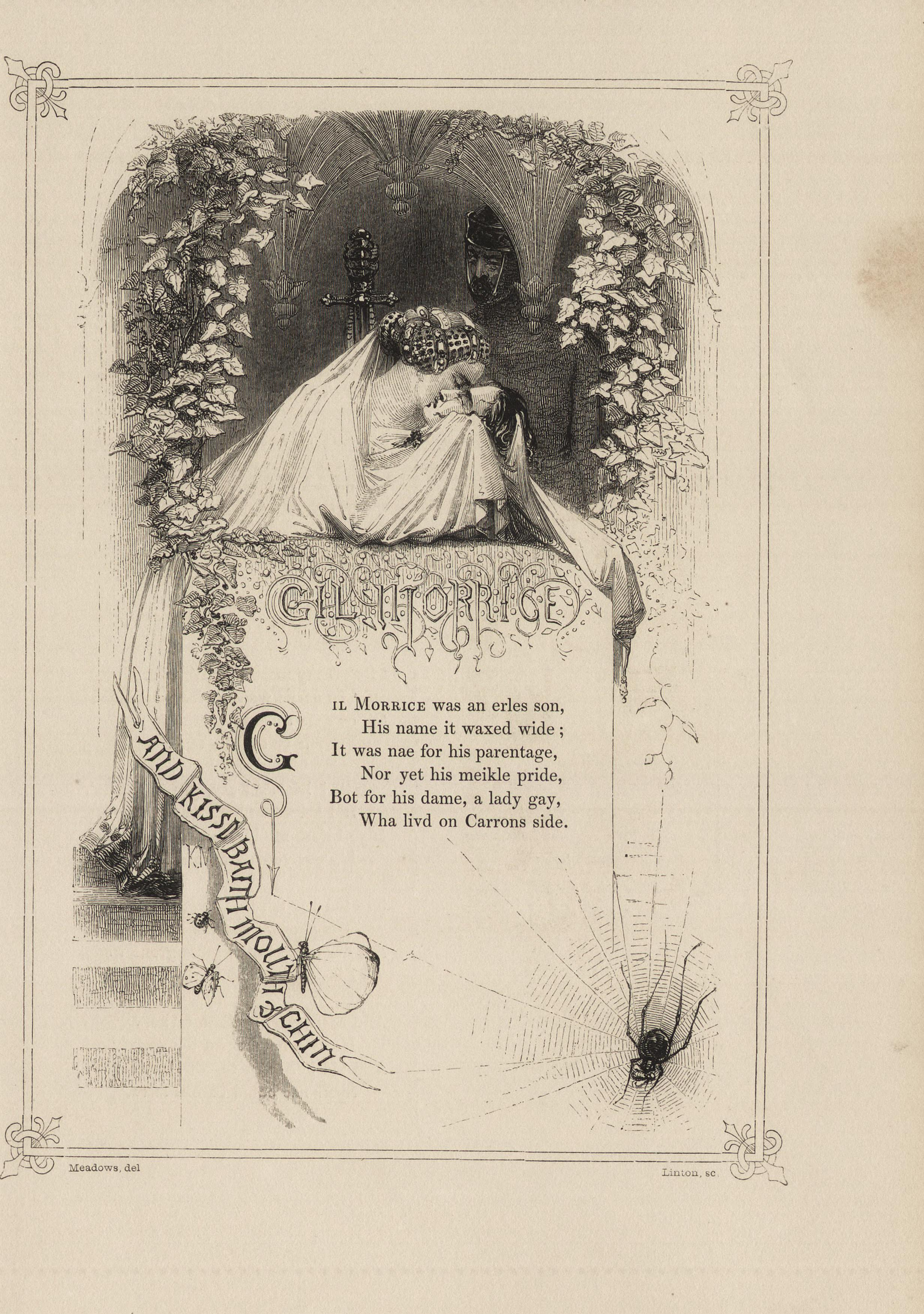
Gil Morrice from The Book of British ballads (1842)

Child Maurice or Gil Morrice (Roud 53, Child 83) is a traditional English-language folk ballad. The earliest known printed version was in 1755 at Glasgow.

== Synopsis ==
The hero sends tokens to his lady and asks her to see him in the woods. Her lord learns of it and comes to where he will meet her, and kills him under the impression that he is her paramour. He brings back the head, and the lady confesses that he was her illegitimate son. Her lord is deeply grieved and declares he would never have killed him if he had known.

== Adaptations ==
John Home based his tragedy Douglas on it. In 1776, Hannah More wrote a poem "Sir Elfred of the Bower" inspired by the song. The ballad serves as the framework as well as the climax of the book Black is the Colour of my True Love's Heart by Ellis Peters.

=== Recordings ===
Album/Single	Performer	Year	Variant	Notes
The English and Scottish Popular Ballads vol 3	Ewan MacColl	1956	Gil Morice	The earliest known professional recording (8'37").
Blood and Roses Vol 2	Ewan MacColl	1981	Child Maurice	This is a different version from MacColl's 1956 recording.
Right of Passage	Martin Carthy	1988	Bill Norrie	
Kornog	Kornog	2000	Child Noryce	The only known version by a French band.
The Furrowed Field	Damien Barber	2000	Bill Norrie	
Songs	Spiers and Boden	2005	Child Morris	
At Ruskin Mill	Martin Carthy	2005	Bill Norrie	The longest recorded version (9'06").

The James Madison Carpenter Collection has a recording by Peter Christie, from before 1955. Most of the recorded versions live up to the comment by Robert Burns in a letter dated September 1793: "It is a plaguy length". Martin Carthy's 2005 version is nine minutes long. the version by Spiers and Boden is over seven minutes, slightly longer than MacColl's 1981 version.

== See also ==
- The White Fisher
