= Brown Adam =

Traditional song

Brown Adam (Roud 482, Child 98) is an English-language folk song.

== Synopsis ==
Brown Adam, a smith, is exiled from his family. He builds a house in the woods for himself and his lady. One day, he goes hunting. He returns home to find his lady with a knight—or king's son—trying to persuade her to leave Brown Adam. She refuses many rich bribes; she will stay with Brown Adam. When he starts to threaten her, Brown Adam makes himself known and maims him, cutting off his hand.
