= Roll, Alabama, Roll =

Traditional sea shanty

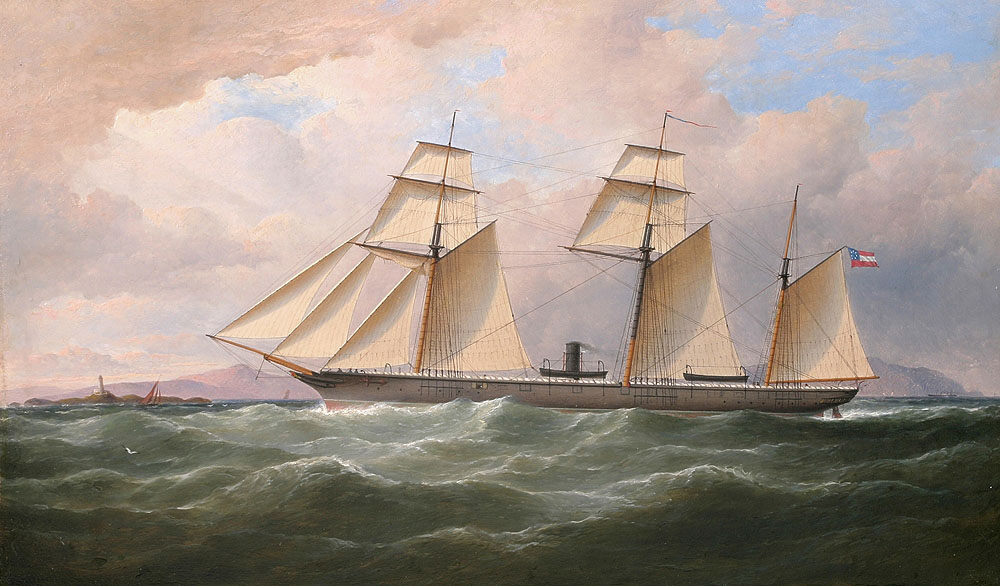
CSS Alabama

"Roll, Alabama, Roll" (Roud 4710) is an American-British sea shanty of the nineteenth century. It is based on the exploits of the CSS Alabama, a sloop-of-war of the Confederate States Navy which enjoyed success as a commerce raider against Union shipping during the American Civil War.

The lyrics describe the ship from its construction by John Laird of Merseyside until its sinking at the Battle of Cherbourg in June 1864. The words were set to the melody of the older song "Roll the Cotton Down" which originated amongst black longshoremen in southern ports of the United States.

== Bibliography ==
- Irwin Silber & Jerry Silverman. Songs of the Civil War. Courier Corporation, 1995.
