= Rolling Down to Old Maui =

Sea shanty

"Rolling Down to Old Maui" (or Mohee) (Roud 2005) is a traditional sea song. It expresses the anticipation of the crew of a whaling vessel of its return to Maui after a season of whaling in the Kamchatka Sea.

== Origin ==
Although the words have been found in records going back to the mid 19th century, there is some dispute about the accuracy and provenance of the melody. The words of "Rolling Down to Old Mohee" have been found in a copybook of a sailor called George Piper, who was on a whaling ship between 1866 and 1872. Similar lyrics were recorded by Joanna Colcord in her collection Roll and Go, Songs of American Sailormen in 1924, where she stated that the melody had been forgotten. She included additional details in the 1938 edition of her book, titled simply Songs of American Sailormen.

Other references point to a version recorded in the journal of the whaling ship Atkins Adams from 1855.

The tune most commonly associated with the song in modern recordings resembles that of the popular 18th-century song "Miller of Dee" but it is unknown what tune was actually associated with the words historically, as only the words were preserved.

== Lyrics ==
It's a damn tough life full of toil and strife
We whalermen undergo.
And we don't give a damn when the day is done/gale has stopped
How hard the winds did blow.
'cause we're homeward bound from the Arctic ground/tis a grand ol' sound
With a good ship, taut and free
And we won't give a damn when we drink our rum
With the girls of Old Maui.

(Chorus)
Rolling down to Old Maui, me boys
Rolling down to Old Maui
We're homeward bound from the Arctic ground
Rolling down to Old Maui.

Once more we sail with a northerly gale
Towards our island home.
Our mainmast sprung, our whaling done,
And we ain't got far to roam.
Six hellish months have passed away
On the cold Kamchatka Sea,
But now we're bound from the Arctic ground
Rolling down to Old Maui.

Chorus

Once more we sail with a northerly gale
Through the ice and wind and rain.
Them coconut fronds, them tropical lands
We soon shall see again.
Our stu'n's'l bones/booms is carried away
What care we for that sound?
A living gale is after us,
Thank God we're homeward bound.

Chorus

How soft the breeze through the island trees,
Now the ice is far astern.
Them native maids, them tropical glades
Is a-waiting our return.
Even now their big brown eyes look out
Hoping some fine day to see
Our baggy sails runnin' 'fore the gales
Rolling down to old Maui.

Chorus

We'll heave the lead where old Diamond Head
Looms up on old Wahu.
Our masts and yards are sheathed with ice
And our decks are hid from view.
The horrid ice of the sea-caked isles
That deck the Arctic sea
Are miles behind in the frozen wind
Since we steered for Old Maui.

Chorus

(The following verse is seen in some collections and performances of the song, but is not universal:)
And now we're anchored in the bay
With the Kanakas all around
With chants and soft aloha oes
They greet us homeward bound.
And now ashore we'll have good fun
We'll paint them beaches red
Awaking in the arms of a wahine
With a big fat aching head.

Chorus

== Versions ==
As it is a folk song, it has been performed and recorded by many singers and bands including Stan Rogers, Todd Rundgren, The Dreadnoughts, David Coffin, The Longest Johns, Oli Steadman, Bounding Main, and Jon Boden. Its melody has also been used, in its entirety as well as in part, as the basis for other folk songs and song parodies, such as "The Light-Ship" by Leslie Fish and "Falling Down on New Jersey" by Mitchell Burnside-Clapp, as well as Brian Robertson's "Old Maui (from the Whales' Point of View)."

A version recorded by Seán Dagher has been included in several video games, including the Assassin's Creed series.
