= Henry Beaufort School =

School in Winchester, Hampshire, England

The Henry Beaufort School

Location
- Priors Dean Road; Winchester, Hampshire, SO22 6JJ; England; 51°04′51″N 1°19′49″W

Information
- Type: Community comprehensive
- Motto: "Pride, Happiness, Ambition"
- Established: 1971
- Local authority: Hampshire
- Department for Education URN: 116438 Tables
- Ofsted: Reports
- Head teacher: Sue Hearle
- Gender: Mixed
- Age: 11 to 16
- Enrolment: 976 As of January 2018
- Capacity: 1100
- Colour: Royal blue
- Publication: The Henry Beaufort School Newsletter
- Website: http://www.beaufort.hants.sch.uk/

Henry Beaufort School is a secondary school in Harestock, a suburb of Winchester, in the county of Hampshire in England.

== History ==
The school was built in 1971 as the first purpose-built, co-educational, comprehensive school in Winchester to serve the new developments created by the new Teg Down, Weeke Manor, and Harestock estates. The school had a full complement of year 7 students and about half a complement of year 8 students in its first year of operation. The school grew each year until 1975, when it had a full five years of intake.

The school was named after Henry Beaufort, who was Bishop of Winchester and three times Lord Chancellor.
