= Burlesque (Bellowhead album) =

Studio album by Bellowhead
- Released: 2006
- Genre: English folk, British folk rock, folk jazz
- Length: 60:19
- Label: Westpark

Bellowhead chronology
E.P.Onymous (2004)	Burlesque (2006)	Matachin (2008)

Professional ratings
Review scores
Source	Rating
AllMusic	3.5/5 stars
Mojo	4/5 stars

Burlesque is the first full-length album by Bellowhead.

== Track listing ==
No.	Title	Writer(s)	Length
1.	"Rigs of the Time"	Trad arr. Boden	3:58
2.	"Jordan"	Trad arr. Boden	4:08
3.	"Across the Line"	Lyrics: Trad/Boden, Melody: M. Nascimento, arr. Flood.	5:10
4.	"London Town"	Trad arr. Sartin	3:53
5.	"Sloe Gin" (Frozen Gin/The Vinegar Reel/The Sloe)	Spiers/Boden/Trad, arr. Spiers and Boden, full band arr. Boden	5:19
6.	"Courting Too Slow"	Lyrics: Trad/P. Bellamy, arr. Spiers and Boden, full band arr. Boden	6:09
7.	"Flash Company"	Trad arr. Bellowhead	3:11
8.	"Hopkinson's Favourite"	Trad arr. Spiers and Boden	3:57
9.	"One May Morning Early"	Trad arr. Boden	2:51
10.	"The Outlandish Knight"	Lyrics: Trad, Melody: M. Carthy, arr. Spiers and Boden, full band arr. Boden	7:03
11.	"Frog's Legs & Dragon's Teeth"	Trad/Boden arr. Boden	4:54
12.	"Fire Marengo"	Trad arr. Boden	4:02
13.	"Death and the Lady"	Lyrics: Trad, Melody: Boden, arr. Boden	5:44
Total length:			1:00:11

== Personnel ==
- Jon Boden - lead vocals, fiddle, tambourine
- John Spiers - melodeon, Anglo-concertina, backing vocals
- Benji Kirkpatrick - guitar, bouzouki, mandolin, banjo, backing vocals
- Andy Mellon - trumpet, flugelhorn, backing vocals
- Justin Thurgur - trombone
- Brendan Kelly - saxophone, bass clarinet, backing vocals
- Gideon Juckes - sousaphone, tuba, helicon, backing vocals
- Pete Flood - drums, glockenspiel, Stomp Box, frying-pan, knives and forks, party blowers
- Rachael McShane - cello, fiddle, vocal
- Paul Sartin - fiddle, oboe, backing vocals, megaphone
- Giles Lewin - fiddle, bagpipes, backing vocals.
