= Ten Thousand Miles Away =

Song
- Written: 1860s
- Published: 1870
- Genre: Sea shanty, bush ballad
- Songwriter: J. B. Geoghegan

"Ten Thousand Miles Away" (Roud 1778) is a sea shanty and bush ballad whose writing and composition are attributed to J. B. Geoghegan.

== Origins and variants ==
In his Shanties from the Seven Seas Hugill says that this was originally a shore ballad sung by street singers in Ireland in the early nineteenth century. Later it became a popular music hall number. The Scottish Student's Song Book gives the author as "J. B. Geoghegan". This is Joseph Bryan Geoghegan (c. 1816 – 1889) who was manager of the Star and Museum Music Hall in Bolton, Lancashire

The song is numbered 1778 in the Roud Folk Song Index and it has been passed from singer to singer as a traditional shanty. The figure of "ten thousand miles" could well refer to the distance between England and Australia, and the separation of the lovers arises because the singer's lover has been transported. Several of the variant texts make this possibility more explicit. For example, the lyrics sung by Jon Boden have the lines

Oh dark and dismal was the day When last I saw my Meg,
She'd a Government band around each hand And another one around the leg.

and the version given by Hugill and that sung by Tommy Makem have very similar lines.

The theme song from Australian 1974 hit television series, Rush, written by George Dreyfuss and arranged by Brian May has some concurrence with the traditional folk tune.

The song was also arranged for a solo melodica and used in the television series SpongeBob SquarePants under the title “Botany Bay” after one variant of the lyrics that mentions Botany Bay extensively.

== Lyrics ==
The lyrics as given in The Scottish Students' Song Book of 1897 are as follows:

Sing Ho! for a brave and a valiant bark, And a brisk and lively breeze,
A jovial crew and a Captain too, to carry me over the seas,
To carry me over the seas, my boys, To my true love so gay,
She has taken a trip on a gallant ship Ten thousand miles away.

Refrain

So blow the winds, Heigh-ho; A roving I will go,
I'll stay no more on England's shore, So let the music play!
I'll start by the morning train, To cross the raging main,
For I'm on the move to my own true love, Ten thousand miles away.

Verse 2

My true love, she is beautiful, My true love she is young;
Her eyes are as blue as the violet's hue, and silvery sounds her tongue
And silvery sounds her tongue, my boys, But while I sing this lay,
She is doing the grand in a distant land, Ten thousand miles away.

Verse 3

Oh! that was a dark and dismal day When last she left the strand
She bade good-bye with a tearful eye, and waved her lily hand -
And waved her lily hand, my boys, As the big ship left the bay
"Adieu" says she, "remember me, Ten thousand miles away."

Verse 4

Oh! if I could be but a bo' s'n bold, Or only a bombadier,
I'd hire a boat and hurry afloat, and straight to my true love steer
And straight to my true love steer, my boys, Where the dancing dolphins play,
And the whales and the sharks are having their larks, Ten thousand miles away.

Verse 5

Oh! the sun may shine through a London fog. and the Thames run bright and clear,
The oceans' brine be turned to wine, And I may forget my beer -
And I may forget my beer, my boys, And the landlord's quarter-day;
But I'll never part from my own sweetheart, Ten thousand miles away!
