= Westpark Music =

German record label

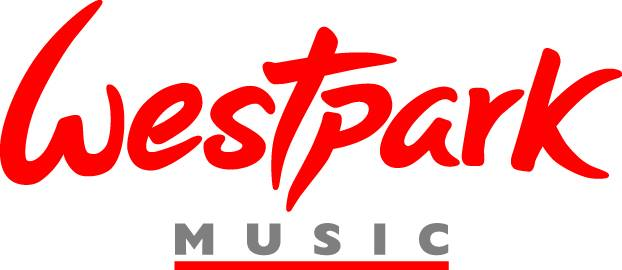
- Founded: 1987; 38 years ago
- Genre: Various
- Country of origin: Germany
- Location: Cologne, Germany
- Official website: www.westparkmusic.de

Westpark Music is a German record label based in Cologne, best known for publishing albums by Gjallarhorn, Oysterband, Hedningarna, Varttina, Bellowhead, Stockholm Lisboa Project, Chumbawamba, Lydie Auvray, Garmarna and many others. Mainly concentrating on folk, folk-rock, folk-metal, ethno-rock, singer-songwriter, ethno, Celtic, fusion, ambient, electronic, progressive and jazz-oriented music.

The company was founded in 1987. In addition to producing CDs, the company offers a range of tune books by the accordion player Lydie Auvray and clarinet player Helmut Eisel.

== See also ==
- List of record labels
