= Jon Boden =

British singer, composer and musician

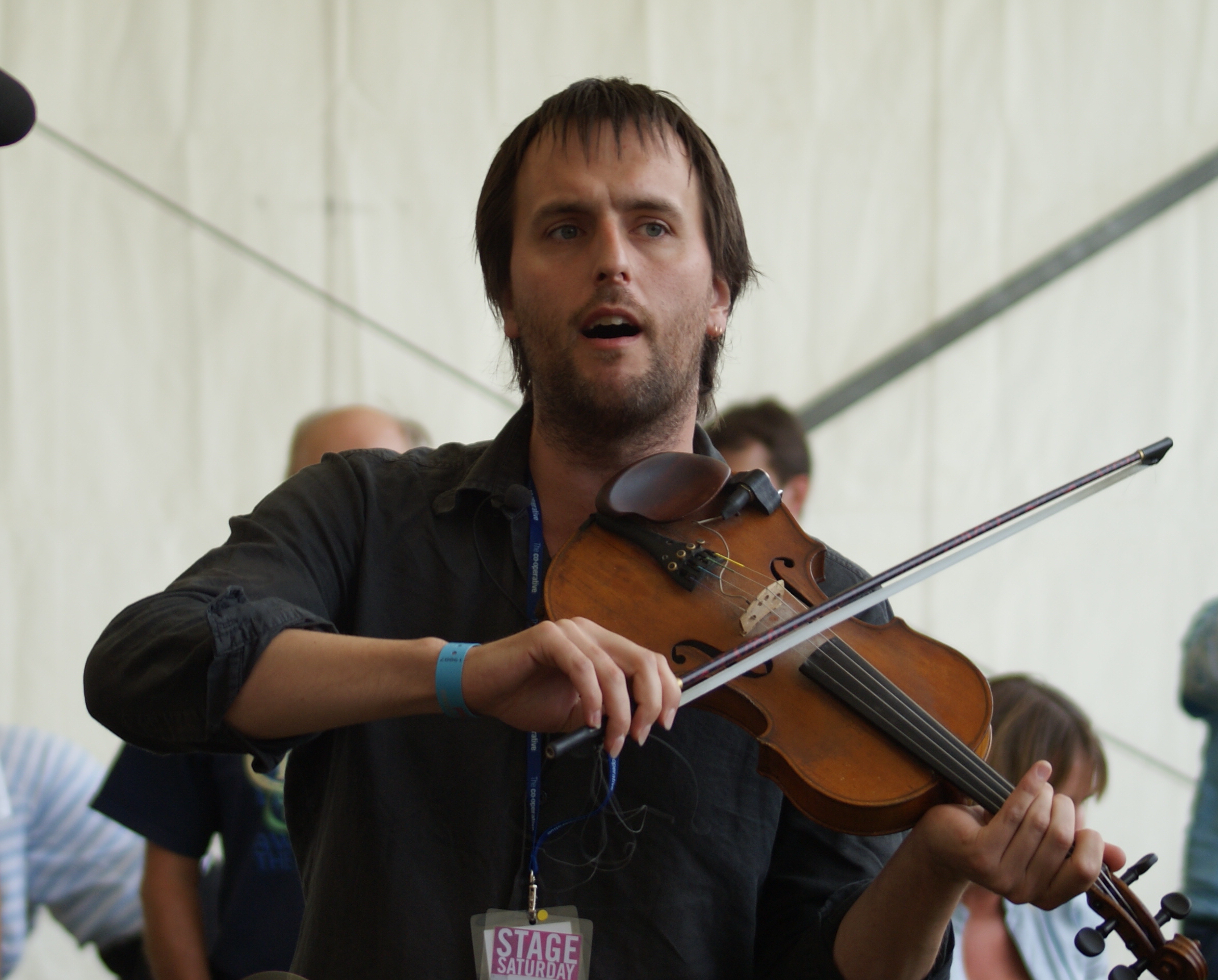
- Jon Boden with Bellowhead at the Cambridge Folk Festival 2009

Background information
- Born: Jon Boden; 17 March 1977 (age 49)
- Genre: Folk music
- Occupation: Musician
- Website: Official site

Jon Boden (born 17 March 1977) is a singer, composer and musician, best known as lead singer and main arranger of Bellowhead. His first instrument is the fiddle and he is a proponent of "English traditional fiddle style" and also of fiddle-singing, both of which he employed in Bellowhead, in the duo Spiers & Boden, and previously as a member of Eliza Carthy's Ratcatchers.

Boden has been the recipient of 11 BBC Radio 2 Folk Awards. He was awarded honorary doctorates by Durham University and the Open University in 2019.

Boden also fronts his own band the Remnant Kings, put together in 2009 to perform his post-apocalyptic song cycle Songs from the Floodplain. He has also made contributions as a fiddler, singer and guitarist, to three albums with Fay Hield & The Hurricane Party.

In 2010 he launched a project to record and deliver A Folk Song a Day on line, aiming to inspire others to build a repertoire of songs and engage in social singing.

Boden holds a master's degree in Composition for Theatre and has worked on theatrical productions, including two plays with the Royal Shakespeare Company. In 2012 he was commissioned to create a stage show based on The Ballad of Little Musgrave and Lady Barnard as part of the Benjamin Britten centenary celebrations.

== Education, early work ==
Boden grew up in Winchester, England, where he attended Henry Beaufort School and Peter Symonds College. He has a BA in Medieval Studies from Durham University and a master's degree in Composition for Theatre from the London College of Music. He has also received honorary doctorates from the Open University and Durham University.

He first started writing for the stage along with friend Chris T-T when still at school and he wrote his first musical whilst at sixth-form college. At Durham University he composed music for a number of plays and wrote a musical for his college. While at Durham he met Ben Naylor who subsequently went on to become a theatre director and with whom Boden has worked many times since.

== Spiers & Boden ==
When Boden first met John Spiers in the Elm Tree pub in Oxford, Boden had little experience of folk clubs. The duo quickly established common ground and started playing together, soon establishing themselves on the live folk club circuit. They were signed by Fellside Records and their debut album Through & Through was released in 2001. The following year they toured with Eliza Carthy as part of her Ratcatchers band.

They released three further albums for Fellside, Bellow in 2003 and the companion discs, Songs and Tunes both released in 2005. Spiers & Boden then signed to Navigator Records releasing the themed Vagabond in 2008 and retrospective album The Works in 2011. The latter marked their 10th anniversary as a recording duo. They toured that year and collaborators from The Works joined them on stage, with a finale at London's Shepherd's Bush Empire featuring many guests.

In Spring 2013, Spiers & Boden undertook the Backyard Songs tour, playing material relevant to each show's locality and inviting audiences to contribute local songs, dances and folklore. Their farewell tour was announced the following year in March and May 2014 and the duo's activities were put on hold.

Boden plays fiddle and guitar, and sings lead vocal, in Spiers & Boden.

== Bellowhead ==
The folk big band was conceived by Spiers & Boden whilst stuck in traffic en route to playing a gig in Essex as a way to take the duo's show to the bigger stages and festivals. Initially, Boden arranged and orchestrated an hour's worth of material for the 10 piece band, all based on existing Spiers & Boden material, in time for Bellowhead's debut at that the 2004 Oxford Folk Festival. This was followed by recording the five track E.P. Onymous, which they released independently.

Adding sousaphone player Gideon Juckes to the lineup in 2005, the band then signed to German label Westpark Music and recorded their debut full-length album Burlesque. These first two releases established Boden as the principal arranger for Bellowhead. He continued in that role, arranging around two-thirds of all the songs Bellowhead recorded.

Bellowhead subsequently signed to Navigator records recording Matachin in 2008 and releasing a further two albums (Hedonism in 2010 followed by Broadside in 2012, both of which, reached Silver Disc status in the UK) before signing to Island Records in 2014 and releasing Revival.

Bellowhead had a total of seven singles 'playlisted' by BBC Radio 2, all but one of which were arranged by Boden. Following Boden's decision to leave the band to pursue other interests, Bellowhead disbanded in May 2016, but reformed in 2020 during the pandemic for a one off livestream, and again in 2022 for a UK 10th anniversary tour of their album Broadside.

== Solo albums, "The Floodplain Trilogy" and The Remnant Kings ==
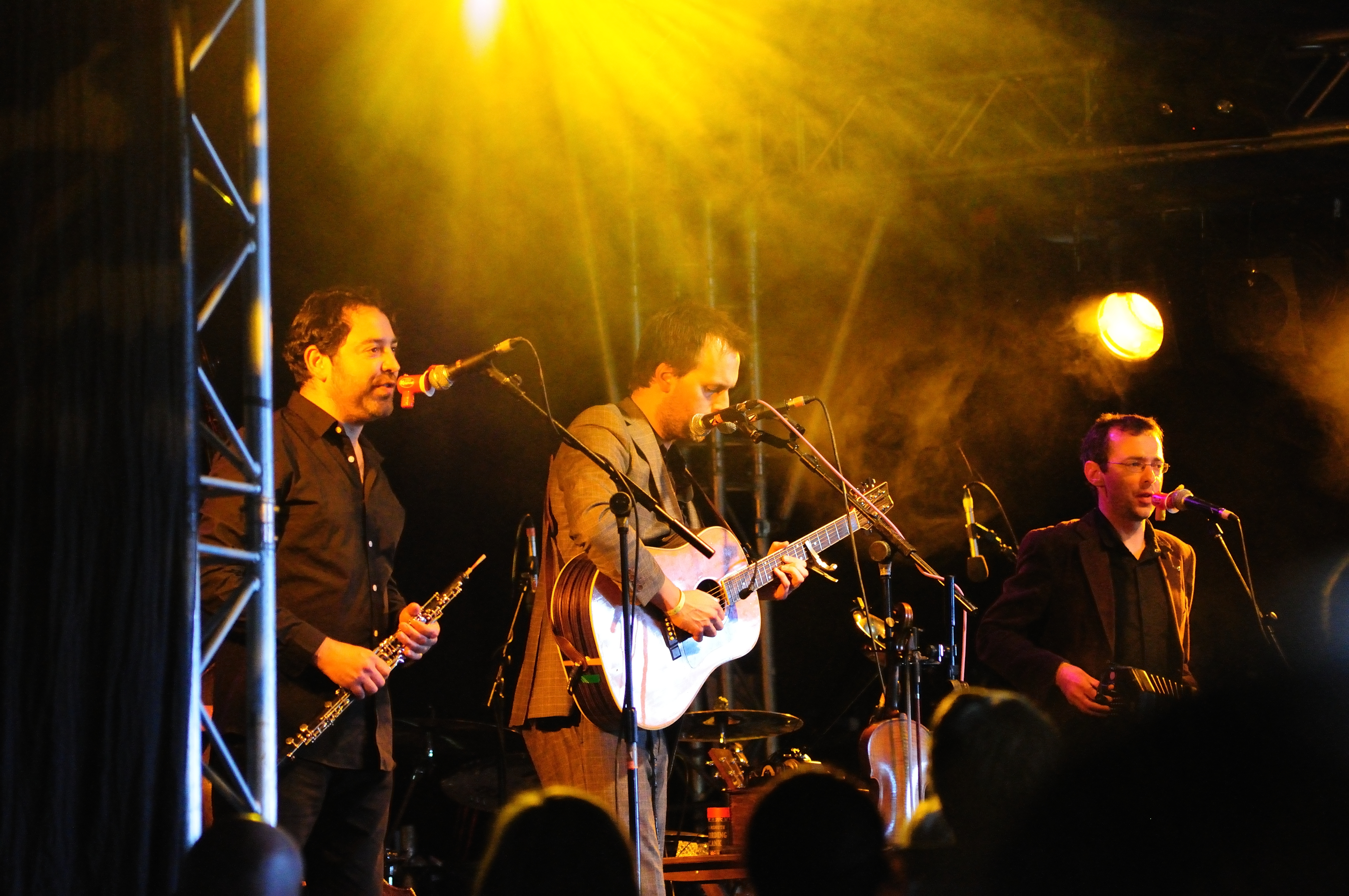
Jon Boden & The Remnant Kings Live at Catton Park

Boden has released six solo albums, Painted Lady in 2006 released on Soundpost Records, Songs From The Floodplain in 2009, released by Navigator Records, Afterglow in 2017, Rose in June in 2019 (Jon Boden & The Remnant Kings), Last Mile Home in 2021 and Parlour Ballads in 2024.

Songs From The Floodplain, Afterglow and Last Mile Home form a post-climate-change trilogy of albums.

Since 2009 Boden has toured regularly with The Remnant Kings. As of 2023 the line-up of the band is Sam Sweeney (drums, fiddle, vocals), Rob Harbron (concertina, fiddle, vocals), Sally Hawkins (oboe, fiddle, vocals), Ben Nicholls (bass guitar, double bass, concertina) and M.G. Boulter (guitar, pedal steel, vocals). Boden plays guitar, electric guitar, fiddle, melodeon and concertina and sings lead on all songs.

As Boden explained in a BBC Radio 3 essay, he views the prospect of a post-industrial world without gas or oil as sitting in harmony with the relevance of folk music and social singing.

Remnant King gigs were also notable for singing sessions organised after the show, either within the venues or at nearby pubs. This saw the band congregate around a table with various audience members, all singing folk songs unaccompanied. The idea was later developed with Bellowhead with the band engaging in regular after show sessions on their tours. Boden discussed the importance of these events in this key-note speech for the English Folk Expo in 2014.

In 2016, following the end of Bellowhead, Boden re-released his first album Painted Lady with three newly recorded tracks, and toured entirely solo for the first time.

In 2017 Boden released Afterglow, a narrative concept album following on from Songs From The Floodplain and the second in a prospective trilogy of post-climate change concept albums.

In 2019 Boden released Rose in June, a selection of traditional and composed tracks performed by the 10 piece Remnant Kings.

In 2021 Boden released Last Mile Home, the third and final album in his Floodplain Trilogy.

In 2024 Jon Boden & The Remnant Kings released Parlour Ballads, a selection of traditional songs, Victorian parlour songs and settings of poems featuring the six-piece Remnant Kings. In contrast to previous albums Boden played piano on most tracks.

== A Folk Song a Day ==
The stated aim of the website A Folk Song a Day was to post a traditional folksong every day for a year. The site grew into a blog with a community exploring the history and roots of the music. Many of the songs were recorded with no accompaniment, but Boden used fiddle, concertina and guitar in some cases. Most were also performed solo, although he had occasional guest singers, notably Fay Hield and several extra voices on some of the carols that were the focus for December, based on the Sheffield tradition at Dungworth. The project was supported with the release of 12 monthly digital albums, making all of the content available for download and ownership.

In October 2014 Boden used the theme as the main inspiration for his keynote address at The Folk Expo in Bury. He explored both the role of the folk singer as professional, but also suggested that there needs to be a balance between performance and participation.

In 2026, Boden completed a book of 365 songs, based on the Folk Song a Day project. This is due to be published by Faber Music in November 2026. He talked about this project, his music and an upcoming tour to Mark Radcliffe on BBC Radio 2 on 7 October 2026.

== Little Musgrave ==
At the start of 2013, Boden was commissioned by Jonathan Reekie, the musical director of Aldeburgh Music to create the show based on Benjamin Britten's The Ballad Of Little Musgrave And Lady Barnard. It was part of a wider global programme of events to celebrate Britten's centenary. The resulting piece used Britten's setting of the ballad for male voice choir, interspersed with five ‘interpolations’ composed by Boden, with lyrics co-written by him and Mary Hampton. The soloists were Mary Hampton, Tim van Eyken, Rob Harbron, James Findlay and The Peterborough Male Voice Choir. The production was directed by David Edwards and was staged at Snape Maltings Aldeburgh, Peterborough Cathedral and The Sage, Gateshead.

== Other projects and commissions ==
In 2013 Boden joined the Sacconi Quartet to perform Elvis Costello and the Brodski Quartet's Juliet Letters at The Bristol Proms. In 2015 they repeated their performance at The Sacconi Quartet's own Chamber Music Festival in Folkestone and at the Lichfield festival.

In film and television, Boden has written the soundtrack for the BBC TV version of the radio comedy Count Arthur Strong. Boden also contributed a version of Mike Scott's How Long Will I Love You to the soundtrack of the Richard Curtis’ feature film About Time, appearing as a busker in an extended montage sequence. Boden's version of the song plays at the end of the film. The theme song for the 2023 BBC show "Beyond Paradise" is arranged by Boden and performed by Bellowhead, as is Sunday Omnibus version of The Archers' theme on BBC Radio 4.

Boden composed All Hallows for Music to Move to, a part of the annual Dance Umbrella, London's international dance festival, celebrating 21st century choreography across the capital and running since 1978. It was a commission from Fuel Theatre and the piece was used to create two videos, the first capture a performance from professional choreographer Vicki Igbokwe, the second a montage of footage from the public, who were encouraged to film their own response to the piece.

Boden was commissioned to compose a short choral piece for The Bristol Proms 2015, which was performed at Bristol Old Vic Theatre by Erebus Ensemble, a 40-voice choir.

In 2019 Boden provided a song for the computer game Nocked.

In 2019 Boden provided music and lyrics for a touring production of the children book The Pirate Cruncher.

In 2021 Boden launched Colourchord system, an experimental system for promoting social singing using simple four-part harmony, funded by Awards For All.

In 2022 Boden arranged and performed orchestral versions of six songs from the Floodplain trilogy of albums, with the Hallam Sinfonia.

In 2023 Boden and Eliza Carthy released an album of seasonal songs, Glad Christmas Comes.

== Solo discography ==
(for other discography see Spiers and Boden)

- Painted Lady (2006)
- Songs from the Floodplain (2009)
- A Folk Song a Day (2010-2011) Jon Boden created 12 monthly albums in one year, one album collating the songs for each month that the project ran.
- Afterglow (2017)
- Rose in June (2019) Jon Boden & The Remnant Kings
- Last Mile Home (2021)
- Parlour Ballads (2024) Jon Boden & The Remnant Kings
