= John Spiers =

English musician

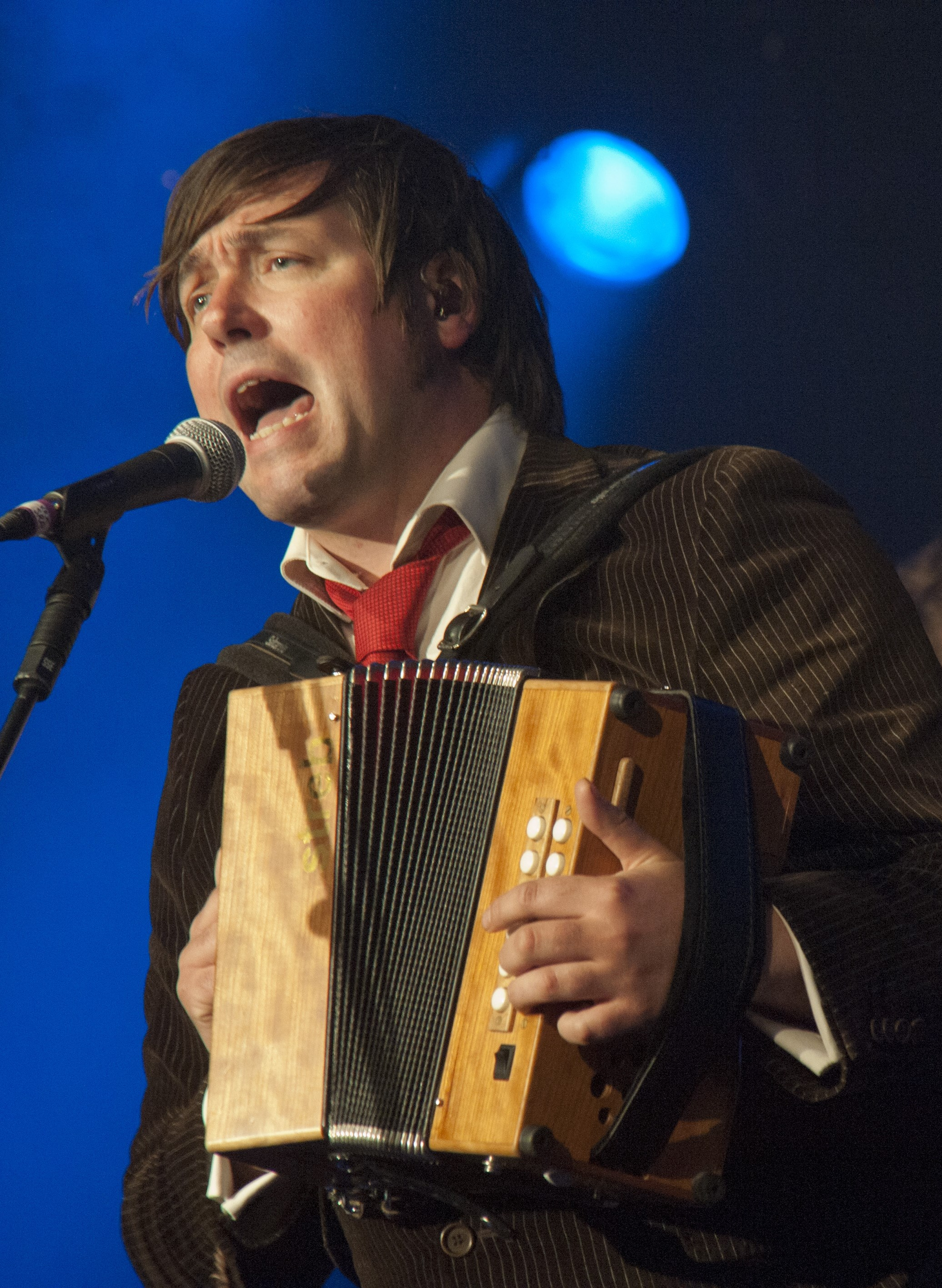
- John Spiers performing with Bellowhead in 2011

Background information
- Born: John Spiers; 1975 (age 50–51); Birmingham, England
- Genre: Folk music
- Occupation: Musician
- Website: www.johnspiers.co.uk

John Spiers (born 1975) is an English melodeon, concertina and bandoneon player.

== Early life ==
Spiers was born in Birmingham but moved to Abingdon at an early age. His father is a Morris dancer. He attended John Mason School in Abingdon, and then went on to study genetics at King's College, Cambridge. As a child he learned the organ and piano and when he was a university student he began to play the piano accordion and melodeon. After spending some time busking he started a new career selling melodeons, of which he owns several.

== Career ==
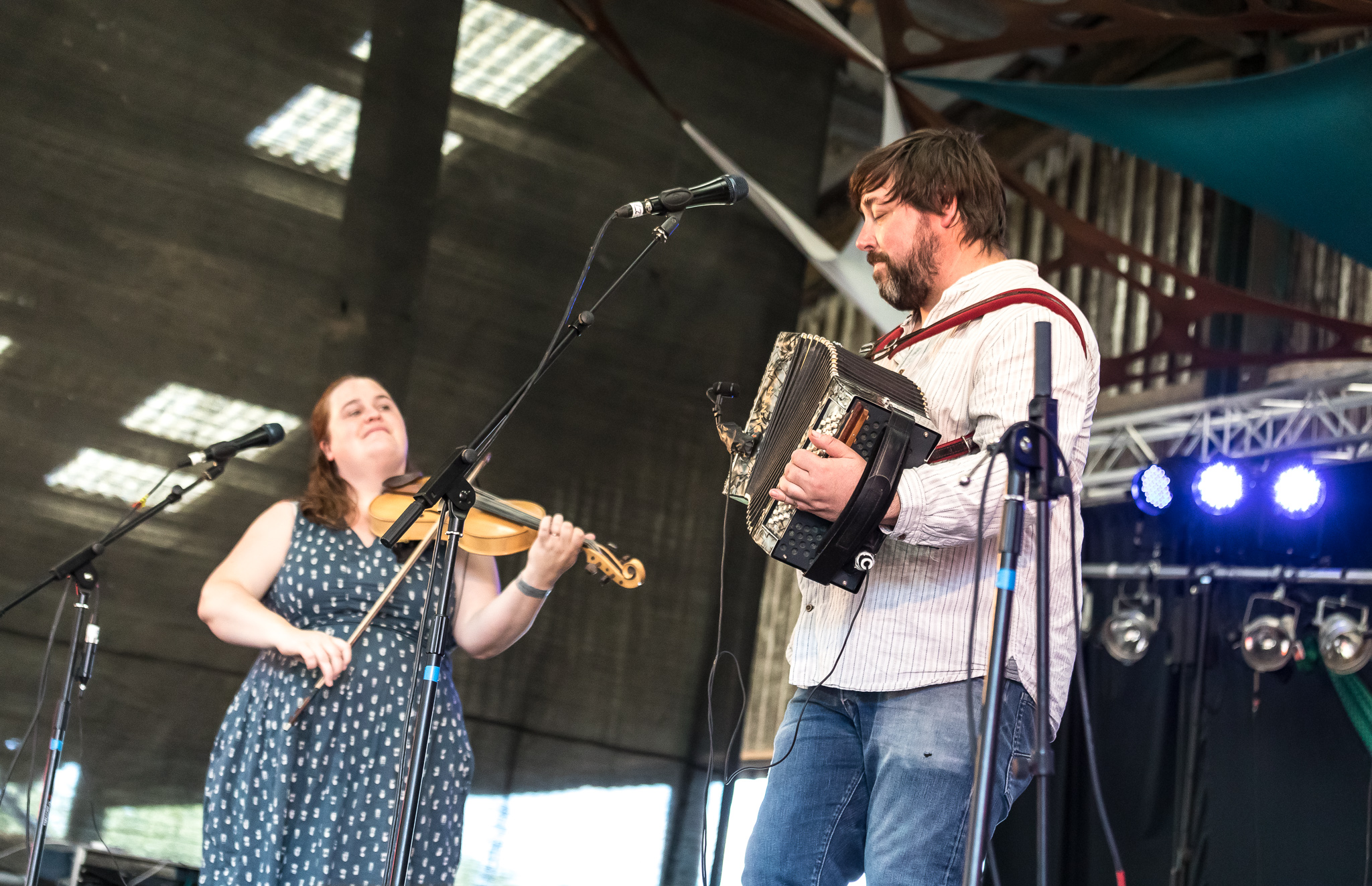
Performing with Jackie Oates at Purbeck Valley Folk Festival in 2021

Spiers is best known for his work with Jon Boden in the duo Spiers and Boden and the band Bellowhead. He also played with Eliza Carthy's former band The Ratcatchers in the mid-noughties. After Bellowhead's dissolution in 2016, Spiers released two albums with Peter Knight: Well Met (2018) and Both in a Tune (2021); the latter has been described as "an extraordinary collaboration between two musicians at the absolute top of their game". Spiers also plays regularly with Knight's Gigspanner Big Band, whose 2020 album Natural Invention was described by Folk Radio UK as "some of the most important and exhilarating art ever to sit under the banner of folk music". Spiers performs regularly in a duo with Jackie Oates, mostly but not just at Nettlebed Folk Club; Oates and Spiers released a joint album in 2020 called Needle Pin, Needle Pin. A Christmas album, A Midwinter's Night, was released in December 2024.

== Compositions ==
Several of Spiers' compositions have become English folk session classics, most notably the jig "Jiggery Pokerwork" (a homage to his first melodeon), and a tune encapsulating his views of the Conservative Party. The former piece is well known among melodeon players for its notoriously unplayable B-section, particularly the infamous "B♭ of doom".

== Other publications ==
- The John Spiers Tunebook (2002) – 32 tunes with chords
- Spiers, John (2017). Jiggery Pokerwork. Oxfordshire, UK: Boars Hill Music.

59 original tunes with chords

- Spiers, John (2020). Foraged Music. Oxfordshire, UK: Boars Hill Music.

a collection of 94 popular session tunes with chords
