= Maud Karpeles =

British song collector

- Born: 12 November 1885; London, United Kingdom
- Died: 1 October 1976 (aged 90); London, United Kingdom
- Relatives: Helen Karpeles Kennedy (sister)

Maud Karpeles OBE, (12 November 1885 – 1 October 1976) was a British collector of folksongs and dance teacher.

== Early life and education ==
Maud Pauline Karpeles was born at Lancaster Gate in Bayswater, London, in 1885. She was the third of five children. Her father, Joseph Nicolaus Karpeles, was a German immigrant who was born in Hamburg, and naturalised as a British subject in 1881. He worked as a tea merchant and stockbroker. Her mother, Emily Karpeles (née Raphael), was born in London. Both her parents were Jewish but nonreligious. Her family moved to Westbourne Terrace, Paddington, when she was about ten. Like her sisters, Karpeles went to boarding school in Tunbridge Wells, where she learned to play the violin and piano, and studied German. In 1906, she spent six months at the Hochschule für Musik in Berlin, taking piano lessons and going to concerts.

== Volunteer work ==
After returning to England, Karpeles was a volunteer with the Invalid Children's Aid Association. For three or four days a week, she visited disabled children and their families in East Ham and Barking, helping with hospital visits and providing developmental support.

=== Guild of Play ===
Once a week, Karpeles volunteered at the Mansfield House Guild of Play in Canning Town. Started by workers at the Bermondsey Settlement, the guild's mission was to teach girls "vigorous happy dances for recreative purposes on educational lines." According to founder Grace Kimmins, songs and dances from "Merrie England" would help to counteract the negative influences of urbanisation. Maud's piano skills were useful in teaching music and movement, and after a while, her younger sister Helen started to help as well. Around this time, Maud Karpeles also became a member of the Fabian Society.

=== Study with Cecil Sharp ===
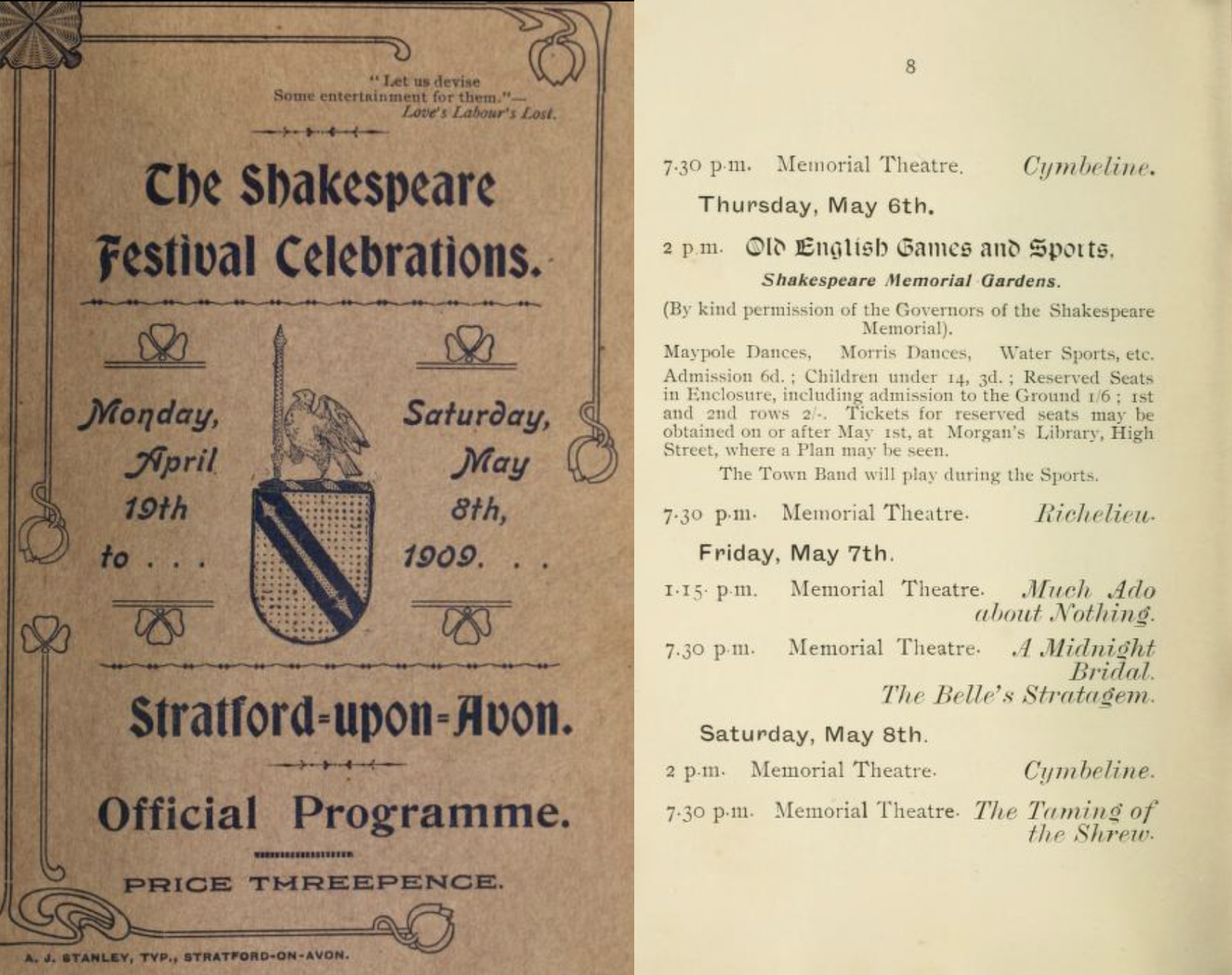
"Old English Games and Sports" at Shakespeare Festival in 1909 including maypole and Morris dancing

In May 1909, Maud and Helen Karpeles went to the Shakespeare Festival in Stratford-upon-Avon, where folk dancing competitions were being held. There, they met Cecil Sharp, who was an adjudicator at the competition, together with Mary Neal. Sharp had been working with Neal and the Espérance Club in teaching Morris dances and folk songs to girls employed in the dressmaking trade in London, and had had considerable success. The Karpeles sisters were "instantly entranced" by the style of folk dancing they saw at the festival. Starting in September, they audited Sharp's classes at the School of Morris Dancing in the Chelsea Polytechnic Institute. Their objective at first was to be able to teach the dances to children at the settlement in Canning Town.

== Collaboration with Sharp ==
=== English Folk Dance Society ===
In 1910, the Karpeles sisters formed an informal Folk Dance Club, together with a group of girls who had been practicing every week at their parents' house. On 3 April 1911, they held a fundraiser for the Invalid Children's Association at Baker Street in London. The Folk Dance Club roped male relatives to join them in dancing, and gave a performance in front of an audience of 500 people. Cecil Sharp gave a lecture and contralto Mattie Kay sang. The event was well received and raised an impressive £60.

The popularity of the Folk Dance Club grew quickly, as Maud Karpeles and her dancers started to give more public demonstrations, and Sharp traveled across the country to promote folk dancing. Maud and Helen Karpeles were soon teaching Morris, sword, and country dancing classes five hours a day as members of his teaching staff. At the Shakespeare Festival that summer, the Folk Dance Club gave performances each week in the Memorial Theatre Gardens. Following a public meeting in December 1911, the Folk Dance Club dissolved to make way for a new national entity, the English Folk Dance Society (EFDS). Helen then became the Honorary Secretary of the EFDS – a role which Maud would take over from 1922 to 1930.

=== Assistant to Sharp ===
In 1913, Maud Karpeles started working for Sharp as his amanuensis, after he developed neuritis in his right elbow. Initially, she wrote his letters in longhand, but quickly learned typewriting and shorthand. In May 1914, Karpeles was involved in Harley Granville-Barker's production of A Midsummer Night's Dream at the Savoy Theatre, which featured folk music and dancing. Sharp arranged the music and choreography, while Karpeles trained the dancers.

Karpeles lived with the Sharp family when they moved to Hampstead in 1915, not long after his wife, Constance Sharp, suffered a life-changing illness. Cecil Sharp referred to Karpeles as "the faithful Maud". On their many travels together, Sharp would introduce her as his "adopted daughter". She would continue to work closely with him until his death in 1924.

=== Work in America ===
With the outbreak of World War I, folk dancing activities were put on hold, and Sharp decided to seek work in the United States to support his family. In the summer of 1915, Maud Karpeles accompanied him to the United States for the first time. She was one of three British teachers assisting Sharp at a summer school he was directing in Maine. During this trip, Sharp met with Olive Dame Campbell, who shared her collection of 200 ballads she had collected in the Appalachian Mountains, inspiring Sharp to embark on his own expedition.

==== Appalachian folk songs ====
Between 1916 and 1918, Karpeles assisted Sharp in collecting Anglo-American songs in the Southern Appalachian Mountains. Over the course of these expeditions, they visited 281 singers, often in remote and inaccessible locations. During their visits, Karpeles recorded the words of the songs, while Sharp wrote down the tunes. In the end, they collected 1,612 tunes representing 500 different songs, from 281 singers. They also "discovered" the country dance now called the "running set".

From July to September 1916, they spent nine weeks in Madison County, North Carolina. At first, Sharp and Karpeles were accompanied by John C. Campbell, who introduced them to numerous key contacts and singers, including Edith Fish, a teacher at a Presbyterian mission school, who was a song collector herself.

=== Post-war projects in England ===
On Armistice Day, Karpeles and Sharp were in Cleveland, Ohio. One month later, they had canceled all further speaking engagements and headed home to England. From 1919, Karpeles and Sharp were busy reviving the English Folk Dance Society. They traveled extensively, resuming many of their previous activities, while also doing field work whenever they could. In September 1922, Karpeles and Sharp collected Morris dances and folk songs across 45 villages in the Midlands. In 1923, the EFDS was reorganised on a county basis, with 43 branches. Sharp continued to suffer from asthma, bronchitis, and fevers, and relied increasingly on Karpeles to get through his many engagements. In May 1924, Karpeles traveled with Sharp through Torquay, Sheffield, Cardiff, Newport, Bath, Birmingham, Lincoln, Norwich, and Ilkley. Sharp was en route to Newcastle to adjudicate a three-day competition, when he became so ill that Karpeles had to take his place. During their trip back to London, Sharp suffered a seizure. By the third week of June, he was only semiconscious, and died peacefully on 23 June 1924.

==== Literary executor ====
Maud Karpeles became Sharp's literary executor after his death, and fought legal battles on behalf of his estate, concerning the legacy of his collections. She later came into conflict with the EFDSS over the issue of copyright. Critics have held that her assertion of copyright was ironic, given that the songs had been shared freely by individuals.

== Fieldwork in Newfoundland ==
Sharp died in 1924, but just beforehand, he had expressed a wish to search for songs in Newfoundland. His theory predicted that the emigrants from Scotland and England would have brought folk songs with them, and that they would still be found there, if anyone cared to look.

From 1929 to 1930, Karpeles finally took up the challenge, and spent around 14 weeks collecting songs. In 1934, she published her collection Folk Songs from Newfoundland.

== Later life ==
The English Folk Dance Society (EFDS) merged with the Folk Song Society (FSS) in 1932 to become the "English Folk Dance and Song Society (EFDSS). The EFDSS elected Karpeles to its Board of Artistic Control in 1932, together with Douglas Kennedy and Ralph Vaughan Williams. Kennedy would later credit Karpeles for ensuring the EFDSS would survive during this time.

She continued to edit Sharp's manuscripts and was an energetic organiser of international festivals. Karpeles organised the International Folk Dance Festival and Conference in London in 1935. The event was a success and helped to raise Karpeles's profile internationally. In 1936, she traveled to Yugoslavia to watch dances; the team had been unable to attend the festival the year prior due to costs.

In 1950, and again in 1955, she returned to the Appalachian Mountains (aged 65 and 70). This time she travelled with a heavy reel-to-reel recording machine, and recorded singers for the BBC. Some of the people she met remembered meeting Sharp the first time around. Once the folk singer Phil Tanner was discovered in Gower, Wales, Karpeles made sure that he was recorded.

=== Work with refugees ===
During the Second World War, Karpeles helped refugee musicians and with the Red Cross. In 1962 refugees from Tristan Da Cunha arrived in Britain. Karpeles visited them and recorded their dances.

=== Publications ===
Cecil Sharp's "English Folk Song: Some Conclusions" was considered to be a classic on the subject and Karpeles added material to the second, third and fourth editions. She never wavered from the original idea of the essential purity of folk song, free from commercialisation or vulgarity.

In 1967 she published "Cecil Sharp: His Life and Work". In 1974 she published two substantial volumes: "Cecil Sharp's Collection of English Folk Songs Vol 1 & 2". "The Crystal Spring" (1975) is shorter version of the collection.

=== Honours ===
Karpeles was awarded the OBE in 1961, for services to folk music. She received two honorary degrees: one from Université Laval in Quebec (1961) and one from the Memorial University of Newfoundland (1970).

== Death and legacy ==
Maud Karpeles died in 1976. In 2000, the English Folk Dance and Song Society issued as set of 55 trading cards with a "flicker book" celebrating the heroes of the folk-song revival. The flicker book shows a Morris dance being performed by Cecil Sharp, Maud and Helen Karpeles. This Kinora Spool can also be seen on the DVD "Here's a Health to the Barley Mow: A Century of Folk Customs and Ancient Rural Games" released by the British Film Institute and the EFDSS in 2011, and on YouTube. The Vaughan Williams Memorial Library in Cecil Sharp House has her unpublished papers and diaries.

== Bibliography ==
Maud Karpeles

- "The Lancashire Morris Dance, containing a description of the Royton Morris Dance, collected and edited by Maud Karpeles" (London: Novello & Company) (1930)
- "Twelve Traditional Country Dances" (1931/1956 London: Novello and Co for the English Folk Dance Society)
- "The Abram Morris Dance" (Journal of English Folk Dance and Song Society) (1932)
- "Folk Songs From Newfoundland" (1934)
- "A Report on Visits to the Tristan Da Cunha Islanders" (Journal of English Folk Dance and Song Society) (1962)
- "Cecil Sharp: His Life and Work" (1967)
- "Folk Songs from Newfoundland" (1971 Faber and Faber)
- "An Introduction to English Folk Song" (1973)

Maud Karpeles and Lois Blake (illustrated by Roland A. Beard)

- "Dances of England & Wales" (1950)

A. H. Fox Strangeways and Maud Karpeles

- "Cecil Sharp" (1933 1st ed) (1955 2nd ed) (1967 3rd ed)

Edited by Maud Karpeles

- "English Folk Songs from the Southern Appalachians. Collected by Cecil J. Sharp" (2 volumes, 1932. London: Oxford University Press)
- "Folk Songs of Europe" (1964. New York: Oak Publications)
- "Cecil Sharp's Collection of English Folk Songs Vol 1 & 2" (1974)
- "The Crystal Spring" (1975) (This is a selection from the 2 vols of "English Folk Songs" 1974)

Cecil Sharp

- "English Folk-Song: Some Conclusions" (preface by Maud Karpeles in 2nd ed 1936)
- "English Folk-Song: Some Conclusions" (edited by Maud Karpeles in 3rd ed 1954 and 4th ed 1965)
- "Eighty English Folk Songs from the southern Appalachians collected by Cecil Sharp and Maud Karpeles" (1968 Faber & Faber) (Piano accompaniments by Benjamin Britten)

Cecil Sharp and Maud Karpeles

- "80 Appalachian Folk Songs" (1983)

Kenneth S. Goldstein and Neil V. Rosenberg (editors)

- "Folklore Studies in Honour of Herbert Halpert: a Festschrift" (St John's 1980)

(contains a chapter by Carole Henderson Carpenter called 'Forty Years Later: Maud Karpeles in Newfoundland')

Dr Pauline Alderman

- "The Journal of the International Congress on Women in Music" (June 1985)

(contains an article called "Four Generations of Women in Musicology". Maud is classified as being in "The Second Generation".)

== See also ==
- Jane Hicks Gentry
- Women in musicology
