= Kinor (disambiguation) =

Kinor may refer to:

- Kinor, a Russian camera manufacturer
- Kinnor, an ancient Israelite musical instrument
  - Kinor David, an annual Israeli cultural award

== See also ==
- Kinora, an early motion picture device
- Kinner Airplane & Motor Corporation
