= Street names of Regent's Park =

This is a list of etymologies of street names in the area of Regent's Park in London (i.e. the park, its immediately surrounding terraces, and Regent's Park Estate to the east); the area has no formal boundaries, though it generally thought to be delimited by Prince Albert Road to the north, Park Village East and Hampstead Road/the Euston railway line/Eversholt Street to the east, Euston Road and Marylebone Road to the south and Park Road and Baker Street to the west.

- Albany Street, Albany Terrace and Little Albany Street – after Prince Frederick, Duke of York and Albany, brother of the Prince Regent (George IV)
- Allsop Place – as this area was formerly Allsop's farm, after Thomas Allsop
- Augustus Street – after Prince Ernest Augustus, Duke of Cumberland and Teviotdale (later King of Hanover), brother of the Prince Regent (George IV)
- Avenue Road – simply a descriptive name
- Baker Street – after Edward Baker, friend and business partner of the Portman family
- The Broad Walk – descriptive
- Brock Street
- Brunswick Place – after Caroline of Brunswick, wife of the Prince Regent (George IV)
- Cambridge Gate, Cambridge Gate Mews, Cambridge Terrace and Cambridge Terrace Mews – after Prince Adolphus, Duke of Cambridge, brother of the Prince Regent (George IV)
- Cardington Street – after the Dukes of Bedford, who also owned land at Cardington, Bedfordshire
- Charles Place
- Chester Close North, Chester Close South, Chester Court, Chester Gate, Chester Place, Chester Road and Chester Terrace – after the Prince Regent (George IV), also Earl of Chester
- Clarence Gardens, Clarence Gate and Clarence Terrace – after Prince William Henry, Duke of Clarence and St Andrews (later King William IV), brother of the Prince Regent (George IV)
- Cobourg Street – after Prince Leopold of Saxe-Coburg-Saalfeld (later King of the Belgians), son-in-law of the Prince Regent (George IV) as the husband of Princess Charlotte of Wales
- Compton Close
- Cornwall Terrace and Cornwall Terrace Mews
- Cumberland Market, Cumberland Place, Cumberland Terrace and Cumberland Terrace Mews – after Prince Ernest Augustus, Duke of Cumberland and Teviotdale (later King of Hanover), brother of the Prince Regent (George IV)
- Drummond Street – after Lady Caroline Drummond, a member of the Duke of Grafton's family
- Edward Mews and Little Edward Street – after Prince Edward, Duke of Kent and Strathearn, brother of the Prince Regent (George IV)
- Euston Grove, Euston Road, Euston Square, Euston Station Colonnade, Euston Street and Euston Underpass – after the Earl of Euston, eldest son of the Duke of Grafton, local landowners when the road was built in the 1760s
- Eversholt Street –after the Dukes of Bedford, whose seat was at Woburn Abbey near Eversholt, Bedfordshire
- Everton Buildings
- Exmouth Mews – presumably by relation to Exmouth Street, now Starcross Street
- Foundry Mews
- George Mews – presumably for the Prince Regent (George IV)
- Gloucester Gate, Gloucester Gate Bridge and Gloucester Gate Mews – after Princess Mary, Duchess of Gloucester and Edinburgh, sister of the Prince Regent (George IV)
- Granby Terrace – after John Manners, Marquess of Granby, noted Georgian-era military commander
- Hampstead Road – as it leads to the north London district of this name
- Hanover Gate, Hanover Terrace and Hanover Terrace Mews – after the House of Hanover, reigning dynasty when the square and street were built in 1713
- Harrington Street – as this land was formerly owned by Dukes of Bedford; Francis Russell, 7th Duke of Bedford was married to Lady Anna Maria Stanhope, daughter of Charles Stanhope, 3rd Earl of Harrington
- Inner Circle and Outer Circle – simply descriptive names
- Kent Passage and Kent Terrace – after Prince Edward, Duke of Kent and Strathearn, brother of the Prince Regent (George IV)
- Laxton Place – after its 1806 developer, the baker George Laxton
- Longford Street
- Macclesfield Bridge – after George Parker, 4th Earl of Macclesfield, chairman of the Regent’s Canal Company in the 17th century
- MacFarren Place – after George Alexander Macfarren, composer and principal at the nearby Royal Academy of Music
- Mackworth Street – after Thomas Mackworth, local landowner who is buried nearby; it was formerly Rutland Street, after John Manners, Marquess of Granby (son of the Duke of Rutland), but was changed in 1938 to avoid confusion with several other similarly named streets
- Marylebone Road – from a church dedicated to St Mary, represented now by St Marylebone Parish Church (1817); the original church was built on the bank of a small stream or "bourne", called the Tybourne or Tyburn. This stream rose further north in what is now Swiss Cottage, eventually running along what is now Marylebone Lane, which preserves its curve within the grid pattern. The church and the surrounding area later became known as St Mary at the Bourne which, over time, became shortened to its present form, Marylebone
- Melton Street
- Mornington Street – after Richard Wellesley, 1st Marquess Wellesley and 2nd Earl of Mornington, noted 18th/19th century statesman and eldest brother of Arthur Wellesley, 1st Duke of Wellington
- Munster Square – after Prince William Henry, Duke of Clarence and St Andrews (later King William IV), also Earl of Munster, brother of the Prince Regent (George IV)
- Nash Street – after John Nash, architect of the terraces around Regent's Park
- Netley Street – possibly after Netley in Hampshire
- North Gower Street – after Hon. Gertrude Leveson-Gower, wife of local landowner John Russell, 4th Duke of Bedford; it is the northern extension of Gower Street
- Nottingham Terrace – after Nottinghamshire, where local landowners the Dukes of Portland owned property
- Osnaburgh Street and Osnaburgh Terrace – after Prince Frederick, Duke of York and Albany, also Prince-Bishop of Osnabrück (Osnaburgh in English), brother of the Prince Regent (George IV)
- Park Road – after the adjacent Regent's Park
- Park Square, Park Square East, Park Square Mews and Park Square West – after the adjacent Regent's Park
- Park Village East and Park Village West – after the adjacent Regent's Park
- Peto Place – after Samuel Morton Peto, MP, entrepreneur, civil engineer and railway developer, who paid for a Baptist chapel to be built here in 1855 (since closed)
- Prince Albert Road – after Albert, Prince Consort; formerly Primrose Hill Road
- Prince of Wales Passage – after the title given to the heir to British throne
- Prince Regent Mews – after the Prince Regent (George IV), by association with Regent's Park
- Redhill Street
- Regnart Buildings
- Robert Street
- St Andrew's Place – after Prince William Henry, Duke of Clarence and St Andrews (later King William IV), brother of the Prince Regent (George IV)
- St Katherine's Precinct – after the former Anglican chapel of St Katharine's Hospital, which retains its original dedication to Saint Katharine, and was built between 1826–1828 (now the Danish Church)
- Stanhope Street – as this land was formerly owned by the Dukes of Bedford; Francis Russell, 7th Duke of Bedford was married to Lady Anna Maria Stanhope, daughter of Charles Stanhope, 3rd Earl of Harrington
- Starcross Street – formerly Exmouth Street, it was renamed after the town of this name in Devon to avoid confusion with similarly named streets
- Station Approach – descriptive, next to Euston station
- Stephenson Way – after Robert Stephenson, builder of the adjacent Euston station from the Victorian era
- Sussex Place – after Prince Augustus Frederick, Duke of Sussex, brother of the Prince Regent (George IV)
- Tolmers Square – after the village of this name in Hertfordshire; the New River flowed from the county and this land was formerly a reservoir owned by the New River Company
- Triton Square and Triton Street – after the Greek god of this name
- Ulster Place and Ulster Terrace – after Prince Frederick, Duke of York and Albany, also Earl of Ulster, brother of the Prince Regent (George IV)
- Varndell Street – after the architect CE Varndell, who took over as surveyor the Regent's Park development from John Nash
- William Road – after Prince William Henry, Duke of Clarence and St Andrews (later King William IV), brother of the Prince Regent (George IV)
- Wybert Street
- York Bridge, York Gate, York Terrace East and York Terrace West – after Prince Frederick, Duke of York and Albany, brother of the Prince Regent (George IV)
