= English Folk Dance and Song Society =

Organisation that promotes the folk arts of England

Coordinates: 51.5381°N 0.1493°W

- Abbreviation: EFDSS
- Formation: 1932; 94 years ago
- Type: Nonprofit organisation
- Purpose: Research, study and promotion of English folk music and folk dance
- Headquarters: London, United Kingdom
- Region served: England
- Chief Executive and Artistic Director: Katy Spicer
- Budget: £1.5 million
- Website: www.efdss.org

The English Folk Dance and Song Society (EFDSS, pronounced 'EFF-diss') is an organisation that promotes English folk music and folk dance. EFDSS was formed in 1932 when two organisations merged: the Folk-Song Society and the English Folk Dance Society. The EFDSS, a member-based organisation, was incorporated in 1935 and became a registered charity in 1963.

== History ==
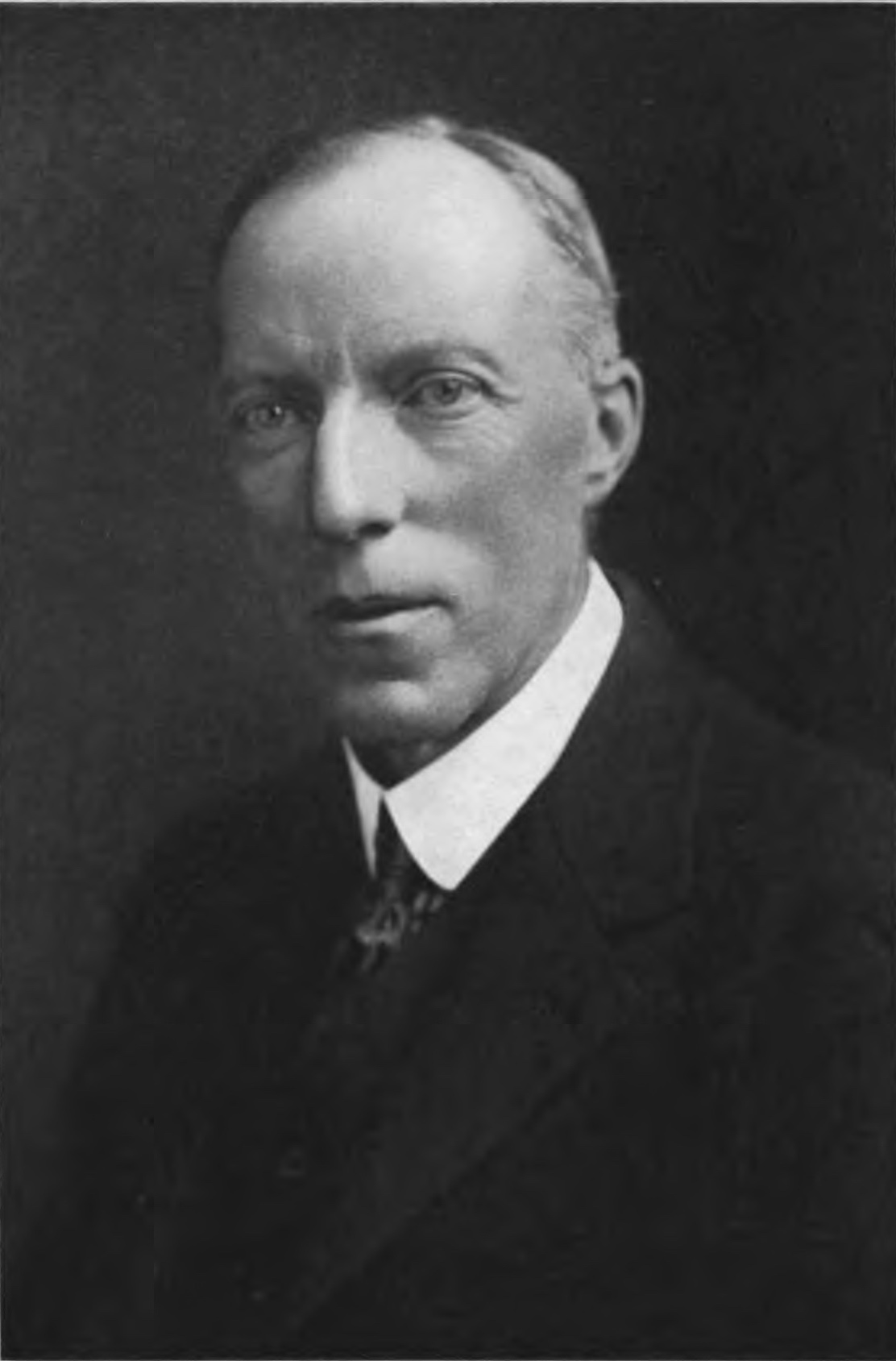
Cecil Sharp, a member of the Folk-Song Society and founder of the English Folk Dance Society; the two societies merged in 1932 to form the English Folk Dance and Song Society

The Folk-Song Society, founded in London in 1898, focused on collecting and publishing folk songs, primarily of Britain and Ireland although there was no formal limitation. Participants included: Lucy Broadwood, George Butterworth, George Gardiner, Anne Gilchrist, Percy Grainger, Henry Hammond, Ella Leather, Kate Lee, Susan Lushington, May Elliot Hobbs, Cecil Sharp, Ralph Vaughan Williams and Mary Augusta Wakefield.

The English Folk Dance Society was founded in 1911 by Cecil Sharp. Maud Karpeles was a leading participant. Its purpose was to preserve and promote English folk dances in their traditional forms, including Morris and sword dances, traditional social dances, and interpretations of the dances published by John Playford. The first secretary of the society was Lady Mary Hepburn-Stuart-Forbes-Trefusis; Trefusis Hall in the EFDSS HQ, Cecil Sharp House, is named after her.

One of the greatest contributions that the EFDSS made to the folk movement, both dance and song, was the folk festival, starting with the Stratford-upon-Avon Festival in the 1940s and continuing with festivals in Whitby, Sidmouth, Holmfirth, Chippenham and elsewhere.

== Publications ==
Since 1936 the EFDSS has published English Dance & Song at least four times a year. This has become the longest-established magazine devoted to folk music, dance and song in the country. English Dance & Song is aimed at stimulating the interest of the membership of the EFDSS, as well as the wider folk music and dance community.

Their regular scholarly publication is Folk Music Journal, published annually in December, which was formerly entitled the Journal of the English Folk Dance and Song Society until 1965. The work continues the earlier journals of the two societies: Journal of the Folk-Song Society, 1899–1931; Journal of the English Folk Dance Society, 1914–31.

== Cecil Sharp House ==
The Society is based at Cecil Sharp House in Camden, North London. Originally conceived as a purpose-built headquarters for the English Folk Dance Society, and now Grade II-listed, it was designed in the neo-Georgian style by architect Henry Martineau Fletcher, and opened on 7 June 1930.

The building's most striking feature is Kennedy Hall, a large concert and performance space with a sprung ballroom floor for dancing. The space features acoustic-focused design elements, courtesy of Fletcher's friend and fellow architect Hope Bagenal.

The building was damaged by bombing in 1940 the Second World War. The basement and library were mostly undamaged, but the entrance, stairs, and main hall were all damaged. After the war, the architect John Eastwick-Field was commissioned to restore the building, which was reopened in 1951. The raised musicians' gallery in the main hall, destroyed by the bombing, was not reinstated; in its place, the British abstract pastoral painter Ivon Hitchens was commissioned to paint a mural depicting English folk dances and traditions. When unveiled in 1954, it was the largest single-wall mural in the United Kingdom.

In addition to Kennedy Hall, Cecil Sharp House contains several smaller performance and rehearsal spaces; a café and bar; and the Vaughan Williams Memorial Library and Archive. Cecil Sharp House is an active and popular venue for concerts, as well as conferences and other private functions. In 2015, the building was voted as one of London's 20 best music venues by readers of Time Out magazine.

== Recent developments ==
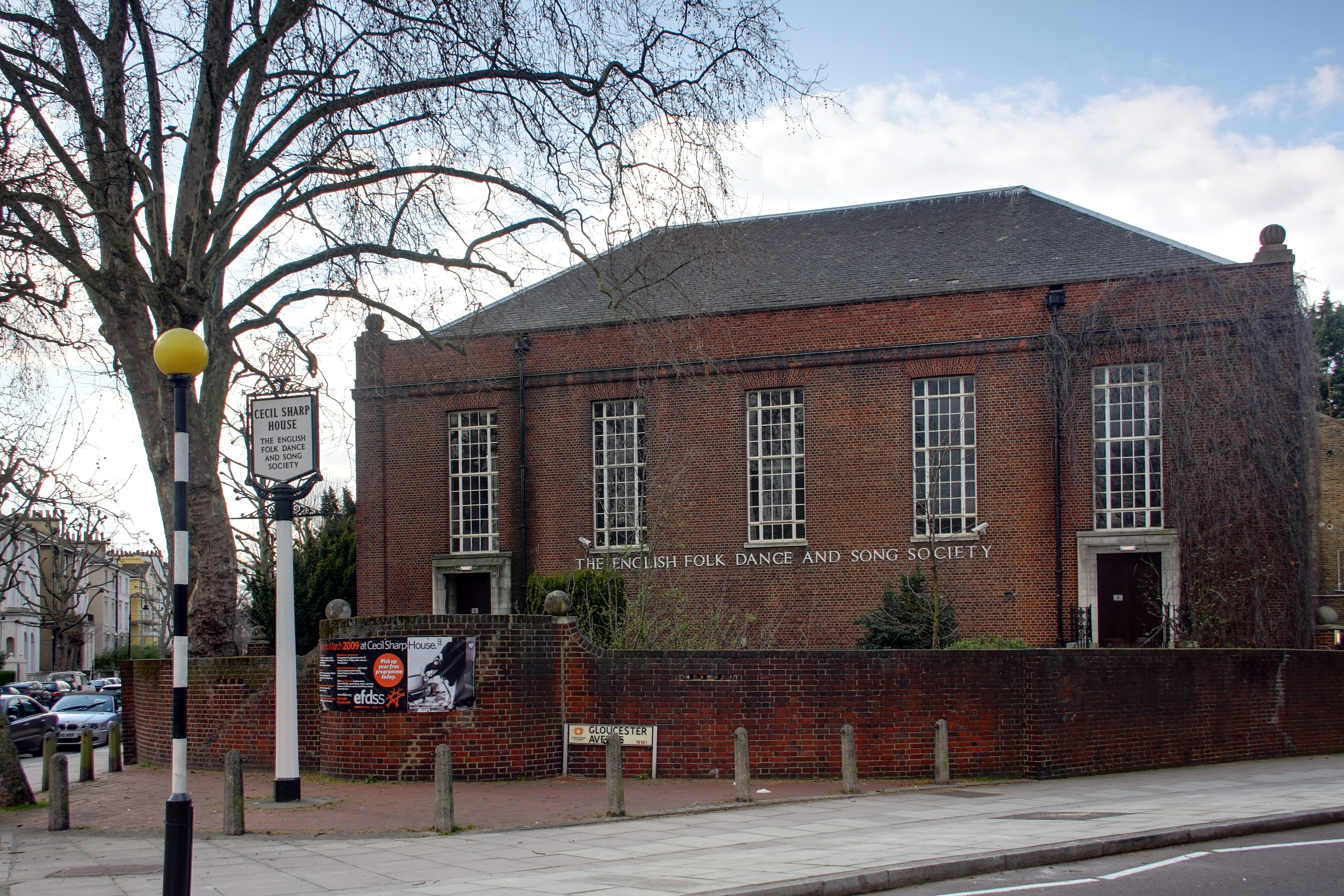
Cecil Sharp House in Regent's Park Road, London, is home to the English Folk Dance and Song Society

In 1998, with the folk movement strongly supported by a number of other organisations and the seeds planted by EFDSS thriving, the EFDSS altered its strategy to focus on education and archiving, with its primary goal the development of the Vaughan Williams Memorial Library as the country's national archive and resource centre for folk music, dance and song.

In 2009, the society became a regularly funded organisation (now called a National Portfolio Organisation) of Arts Council England.

In 2011 the society entered into a joint commission with Shrewsbury Folk Festival to create the Cecil Sharp Project, a multi-artist residential commission to create new works based on the life and collecting of Cecil Sharp. The project took place in March 2011, the artists involved being: Steve Knightley, Andy Cutting, Leonard Podolak, Jim Moray, Jackie Oates, Caroline Herring, Kathryn Roberts and Patsy Reid.

In 2013, EFDSS launched The Full English, an ongoing archive project supported by the Heritage Lottery Fund, The Folklore Society, the National Folk Music Fund and the English Miscellany Folk Dance Group. This free and searchable resource of 44,000 records and over 58,000 digitised images is the world's biggest digital archive of traditional music and dance tunes.

As well as folk music, the EFDSS is home to a number of performance artists, providing a regular performance platform for acts including the Ukulele Orchestra of Great Britain, the Massive Violins and the Swingle Singers.

In September 2021, EFDSS opened consultation to consider changing its name, as it was felt by some that it did not represent the aims and outlook of the society. A proposed name was 'Folk Arts England', a name formerly used between 2005 and 2014 by the Association of Festival Organisers. Of 65 members surveyed in November 2021, 74% approved this name, against other proposals such as 'Folk Arts Society'. As of 2026, the organisation has rebranded itself as Folk England.

== EFDSS Gold Badge Awards ==
The EFDSS Gold Badge Award, created in 1922, is made to those deemed to have made exceptional contributions to folk music, dance, or the wider folk arts and folk community. Many past recipients are prominent figures not only within the folk community, but of wider British culture and society.

- 1922 Lady Mary Trefusis; Grizelda Hervey
- 1923 Cecil Sharp; William Kimber
- 1928 Maud Karpeles; William Wells
- 1929 Helen Storrow
- 1930 Winifred Shuldham-Shaw
- 1934 W H Bonham Carter
- 1938 Anne Gilchrist; Miss E F Lawrence
- 1940 Miss C Holbrow
- 1943 Dr Ralph Vaughan Williams
- 1945 Miss H Cornock Keen
- 1946 Lady Ampthill; Frank Howes
- 1948 Frederick Keel; R J Tabor; Rev E A White
- 1950 Richard Callender
- 1954 Violet Alford; Elsie Avril; Marjory Sinclair
- 1956 P J Terry
- 1957 Janet McCrindell
- 1960 Kenneth Constable; Irene Fisher; Marjorie Heffer; Dr Robert Kenworthy Schofield; George Osborne
- 1961 Kathleen Adkins; Miss L Chapin; Lily Conant; May Gadd; Margaret Grant; Sybil Lightfoot; Grace Meikle; Philip Merrill; Marjorie Penn; Evelyn Wells; Elsie Whiteman
- 1962 Alec Hunter
- 1963 Everal de Jersey
- 1964 Mary Trevelyan; Dorothy Bessant
- 1965 Douglas Kennedy & Helen Kennedy
- 1969 Harry Cox; Arthur Marshall; Edward Nicol
- 1970 Dr W Fisher-Cassie; Fred Hamer
- 1971 Nan Fleming-Williams; Patrick Shuldham-Shaw
- 1973 Mollie Du Cane; Dr Leonard C Luckwill
- 1974 William Ganiford
- 1975 A L Lloyd
- 1976 Kenneth Clark; Johnson Ellwood
- 1977 Stan Hugill; Rev Kenneth Loveless
- 1978 Sybil Clark; Bob Copper (Copper Family); Kathleen Mitchell
- 1979 Bill Rutter
- 1980 Dr Russell Wortley
- 1981 Dr Lionel Bacon; Bob Cann
- 1982 Sam Sherry; The Watersons (Lal, Norma and Mike Waterson, John Harrison and Martin Carthy)
- 1983 Nibs Matthews; Walter Pardon; The Spinners (Tony Davis, Mick Groves, Cliff Hall and Hugh Jones)
- 1984 Philip Bloy; Leslie Hyner
- 1986 Hugh Rippon
- 1987 Reg Hall; Ewan MacCoIl; Peggy Seeger; Michael Yates
- 1988 Joe Brown; Ursula Vaughan Williams
- 1989 Peter Dashwood; Jack Hamilton
- 1990 Tom Cook; Pat Tracey
- 1995 Ivor Allsop; Liza Austin; Brenda Godrich; Cyril Jones; Fred Jordan; Harry Pitts; Rex Laycock
- 1996 May Beeforth; Elsie Cloughton; Tony Foxworthy; Francis Shergold
- 1997 Barbara Kinsman; Ivy Romney; Cyril Swales
- 1998 Jill Copper, John Copper & Jon Dudley (Copper Family); Marjorie Fennessy; Dr Ian Russell
- 1999 Roy Judge; Ron Smedley
- 2001 Roy Dommett; Dr Denis Smith; Trevor Stone
- 2002 Christopher Cawte; John Kirkpatrick; Dave Swarbrick
- 2003 Dave Arthur; Shirley Collins; Iona Opie; Roy Palmer
- 2004 Steve Heap; Peter Kennedy; Geoff Rye; Malcolm Taylor
- 2005 Alistair Anderson; Tony Engle; Phil Heaton; Aubrey O’Brien; Doc Rowe
- 2007 Eliza Carthy; Michael Heaney; Frank Purslow; Pat Wilkinson; The Yetties (Bonny Sartin, Pete Shutler and Mac McCulloch)
- 2008 Ray Fisher; John Heydon; Lou Killen; Colin Ross
- 2009 Jack Brown; Beryl Marriott; Roger Nicholls; Steve Roud; Derek Schofield
- 2010 Jim Coleman; Vic Gammon; John Howson; Katie Howson; Taffy Thomas
- 2011 Johnny Handle; Nic Jones; George Peterson; Les Seaman; Jackie Toaduff; Eddie Upton
- 2012 Bill Leader; Graeme Miles
- 2013 Ashley Hutchings; Ricky Forster; David Blick
- 2014 Maddy Prior; Sandra Kerr; David Leverton; Alan Bearman
- 2015 Ian A. Anderson; John Tams; Rollo Woods; Paul Wilson and Marilyn Tucker (Wren Music)
- 2016 Maggie Fletcher; Pete Coe and Sue Coe; Mike Wilson-Jones and Mary Wilson-Jones
- 2017 Johnny Adams; Nicolas Broadbridge; Dave and Maggie Hunt; The Wilson Family
- 2018 Frankie Armstrong; John Bacon; Antony Heywood; Vic Legg
- 2019 Carolyn Robson; Chris Coe; John Graham; Mike Norris; Kate Rusby
- 2020 Paul and Liz Davenport; Benny Graham; Mick Peat
- 2021 Lynette and Jim Eldon; Kerry Fletcher; Chris Metherell; Rod Stradling
- 2022 Madeleine Smith; Lawrence Heath; Roger Watson; Carol and the late Gwilym Davies
- 2023 Sean Goddard

== See also ==
- Vaughan Williams Memorial Library
- Country Dance and Song Society, the American counterpart to the EFDSS
