= William Kimber =

English musician

William Kimber

William "Merry" Kimber (8 September 1872 – 26 December 1961), was an English Anglo concertina player and Morris dancer who played a key role in the twentieth century revival of Morris Dancing, a form of traditional English folk dancing. He was famous both for his concertina playing and for his fine, upright dancing, such that in his day he was presented in the highest circles of society.

Kimber was born at Headington Quarry, Oxford, the eldest of six children of William and Sophia Ann Kimber. Kimber left school in 1882 to work as a bird-scarer before taking up the trade of a bricklayer. His father, a builder, was an amateur musician and a member of the local morris side. Kimber first danced with the side in 1887, when the side performed in celebration of Queen Victoria's golden jubilee.

He played the concertina for his local Morris Dancers, the Headington Quarry Morris Men, and was the musician when Cecil Sharp encountered them in 1899. Sharp, who was to be in the forefront of the revival of English folk music and dancing, asked Kimber to return the next day and play the tunes again for him to record. In 1905, Mary Neal, the founder of the Espérance Club, asked Sharp for advice about folk dances which could be performed by the young women of the club. He told her about Kimber and the Headington morris, and Neal invited Kimber to come to London to teach the members the dances for their Christmas party.

It was at these London lessons that Sharp and Kimber met once again; subsequently Kimber acted as Sharp's informant on the Headington Quarry Morris tradition, and as his assistant at lectures. Sharp would lecture while Kimber demonstrated the dances and played the concertina. Kimber's fame grew, and he danced at the Royal Albert Hall, the Mansion House, and in front of King Edward VII and Queen Alexandra at Chelsea Hospital. Kimber's version of the folk tune Country Gardens was noted by Cecil Sharp.

Kimber's Anglo concertina playing made use of the left-hand to add simple chordal and rhythmic accompaniments. The recordings made of Kimber are among the very few recordings that exist of English traditional concertina players.

In 1894, Kimber married Florence Cripps, and they had eight children. "Merry" Kimber built a house for himself in St Anne's Road, Headington Quarry in 1911, which he named "Merryville". His wife died in 1917, and in 1920 he married Bessie Clark. He started morris teams in Headington Quarry in 1911, 1921, and 1948.

In 1922, Kimber was presented with the gold medal of the English Folk Dance Society at the music festival held in the gardens of New College, Oxford, with the professor of music, Sir Hugh Allen, presiding in a smock and a garlanded top hat. From 1946, Kimber taught Morris dancing to boys at Headington Secondary School.

Kimber died in 1961 at "Merryville", and at his funeral at Holy Trinity Church, Headington Quarry, his coffin was carried by the Headington Quarry Morris Men in their Morris regalia.

== Discography ==
- Absolutely Classic: The Music of William Kimber (1999), The English Folk Dance and Song Society
- The Art of William Kimber (1974), Topic Records

"Country Gardens" from The Art of William Kimber is included as track seven on the first CD of the Topic Records 70 year anniversary boxed set Three Score and Ten.
