= Massive Violins =

Musical ensemble of singing cellists

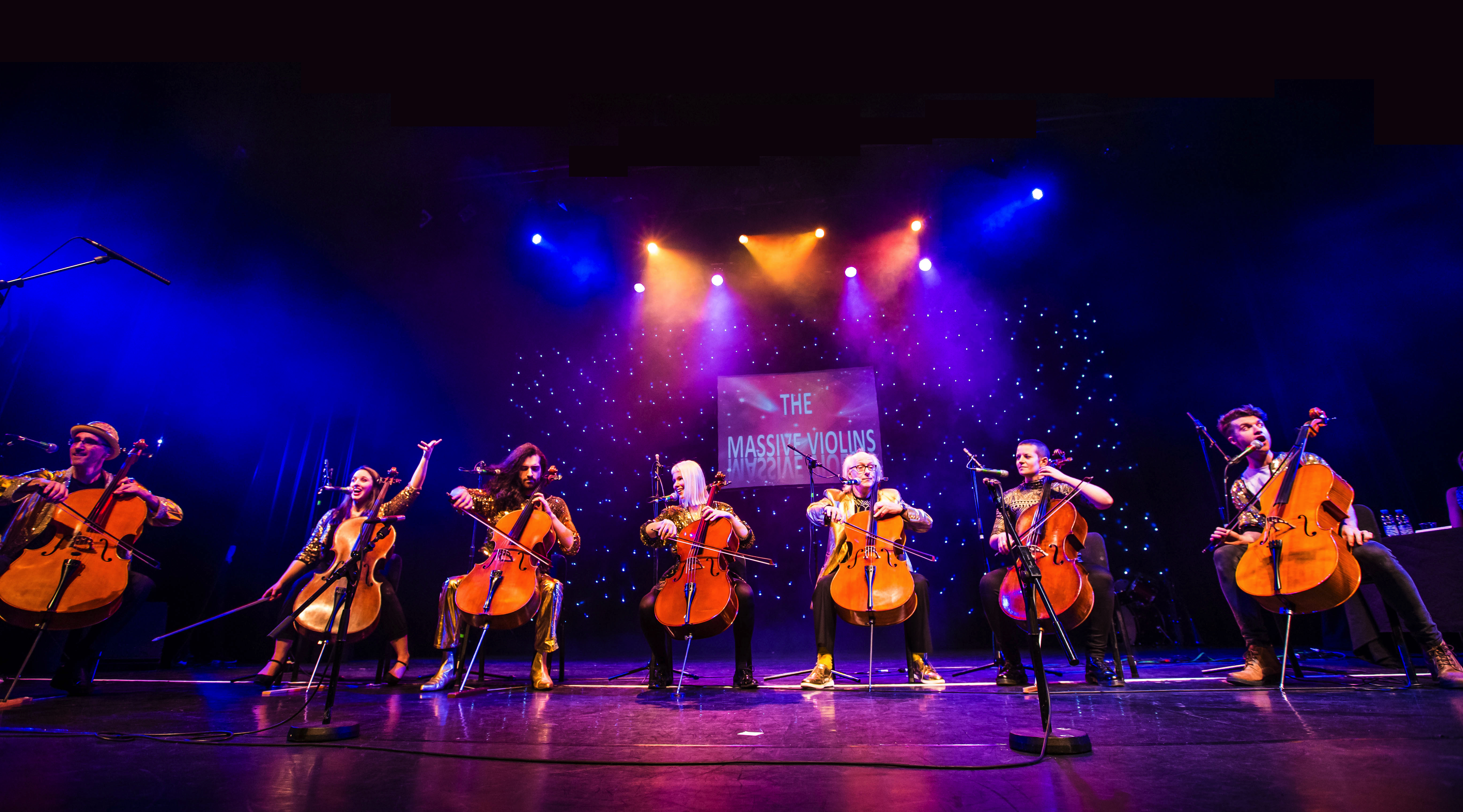
- Massive Violins, North London's Got Talent 2016

Background information
- Origin: London, England
- Genres: Varied musical styles
- Years active: 2010–present
- Spinoffs: Clean Bandit
- Members: Ricky Chatto; Grace Chatto; Matthew Hammett-Knott; Camilla Farrant; Guido Martin-Brandis; Jess Chandler; Saul Berkowitz
- Website: massiveviolins.com

Massive Violins are a musical ensemble of singing cellists. They play music from a variety of musical genres, all using the cello and voice.

== History ==
Founded in 2010, the Massive Violins have performed concerts in venues across the UK and internationally, including a biannual concert at Cecil Sharp House, a residency at Hornsey Town Hall and regular appearances at festivals including the Isle of Arts Festival, Ventnor Fringe, Lawnfest and Frinton-on-Sea. The ensemble was also crowned winners of North London's Got Talent in 2016.

The ensemble was created as a cello alternative to the Ukulele Orchestra of Great Britain, with whom they performed in September 2017.

== Repertoire ==
A typical concert comprises songs from a variety of musical genres: favourites with audiences include Johnny Cash's Ring of Fire where the cello is played side-ways like a guitar, a live performance of Queen's Bohemian Rhapsody, The Sound of Music medley featuring impersonations of Julie Andrews and Gretel, Michael Jackson's Thriller and a rendition of The Beatles' When I'm Sixty-Four.

== Performances ==
The ensemble performs in cities around the UK, France and the Netherlands. As well as regular concert performances at Cecil Sharp House, Hornsey Town Hall Arts Centre and many UK festivals, the Massive Violins have provided entertainment at launch parties, including Channel 4's Random Acts, Bradley Cooper's The Elephant Man at the Haymarket, Christie's Auction House, at the Okura Hotel Amsterdam, at the 20th Century Theatre, supporting Fascinating Aida, and at the London Olympic's pop-up cinema Films on Fridges.

The Massive Violins have a wide following of loyal concert-goers with numerous celebrity fans as regular audience members, including Neil Morrissey, Simon Amstell, Jemma Redgrave, Alison Steadman, James Norton, Marina and the Diamonds, Jennifer Saunders and Helena Bonham Carter. They have performed at private functions for Shirley Bassey, Pierce Brosnan, Joan Collins and Bradley Cooper.

The ensemble frequently perform for charity fundraisers; they are winners of North London's Got Talent 2016 in aid of North London Hospice, and perform at International Animal Rescue as well as 'Lots of Charity' events. In September 2017 they performed at the Jazz Cafe with the Ukulele Orchestra of Great Britain as part of the Art on a Ukulele fundraising event.

== Discography ==
The first album, entitled Bowing 24/7 was recorded in 2014 at Priory Road Studios and features 11 tracks of their most popular interpretations of songs.

The Christmas Album, recorded in 2015 at Priory Road Studios, features a mix of vocal and instrumental tracks.

== Video and audio clips ==
- The Sound of Music Medley video on YouTube
- All I want for Christmas video on YouTube
- Album tracks available on Spotify or iTunes

== Current members ==
The ensemble has had a varying line-up since its foundation, but since 2010 have performed as a septet or quintet of singing cellists, occasionally including one bespoke drum-cello. The members are renowned for wearing gold sequinned outfits in their performances.

- Ricky Chatto
- Grace Chatto (of Clean Bandit)
- Matthew Hammett-Knott
- Camilla Farrant
- Guido Martin-Brandis
- Jess Chandler
- Saul Berkowitz
