= Regent's Park Estate =

Housing estate in London

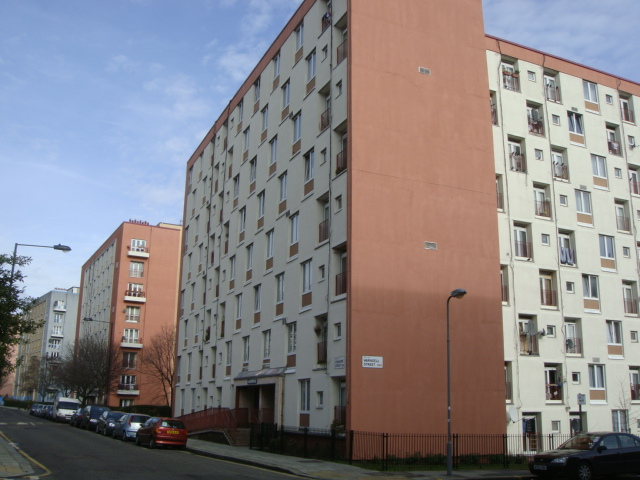
Tower blocks on the estate

Regent's Park Estate is a large housing estate in the London Borough of Camden. The estate consists of nearly 2,000 homes across 49 buildings and lies on either side of Robert Street, between Albany Street and Hampstead Road. It is immediately to the east of the Regent's Park estate owned by the Crown Estate. The estate includes the sites of Cumberland Market, Munster Square and Clarence Gardens.

The estate mainly comprises council housing built in the 1950s by the leading architects of the day such as Frederick MacManus and owned or formerly owned by the London Borough of Camden. It stands on land sold in 1951 by the Crown Estate to the Metropolitan Borough of St Pancras, following the destruction of most of the John Nash designed public housing in the area during the London Blitz.

New blocks are planned to be built on-site to replace the 182 homes (136 for social rent and 24 privately owned under Right to Buy) that are to be lost with the demolition of the Eskdale, Ainsdale, and Silverdale blocks (possibly followed by the demolition Langdale, Coniston, and Cartmel blocks) located on the northwestern edge of the estate next to the railway line as part of the construction of the new London-Birmingham high-speed rail line (known as HS2) and an expanded Euston Station. Camden Council, which consistently objected to the demolition, has produced area plans for regeneration that include a mix of infill development of new tower blocks and creating additional floors on existing buildings, as well as the replacement of local amenities such as a local pub and shops that will be lost to demolition in the area. The estate will house a total of 94 replacement units, while the nearby Netley development will provide 70 replacement homes; Regent's Park Estate will also see 22 units built in addition to the replacement scheme. Among the total 116 new homes on Regent's Park Estate (counting both "replacement" and "new" homes), 84 will be for social rent, 34 "intermediate" (London Affordable Rent or London Living Rent), and 10 will be market rate homes.

The estate is served by two state primary schools adjoining the estate: Netley Primary School and Christ Church School

Most of the Estate is named after places in the Lake District such as Windermere, Cartmel, Rydal Water (see also Street names of Regent's Park).

== Munster Square ==
Munster Square is a garden square in the estate (51.5265°N 0.1427°W). It was formerly called 'York Market' and 'York Square'. It was created by John Nash as the most southern of the three market squares serving Regents Park area, south of Clarence Gardens and Cumberland Market. The square was originally surrounded by Nash-designed terraces but was badly damaged in the Blitz so was demolished and rebuilt as part of the estate after the war.

The middle of the square is a public park. The square is home of grade II*-listed St Mary Magdalene Church.

It was scene of a widely reported murder in 2019.

Munster Square was designed by architect Frederick MacManus and by coincidence he was born in Dublin, Ireland, on a street called Munster Street.
