= May Elliot Hobbs =

Scottish folklorist

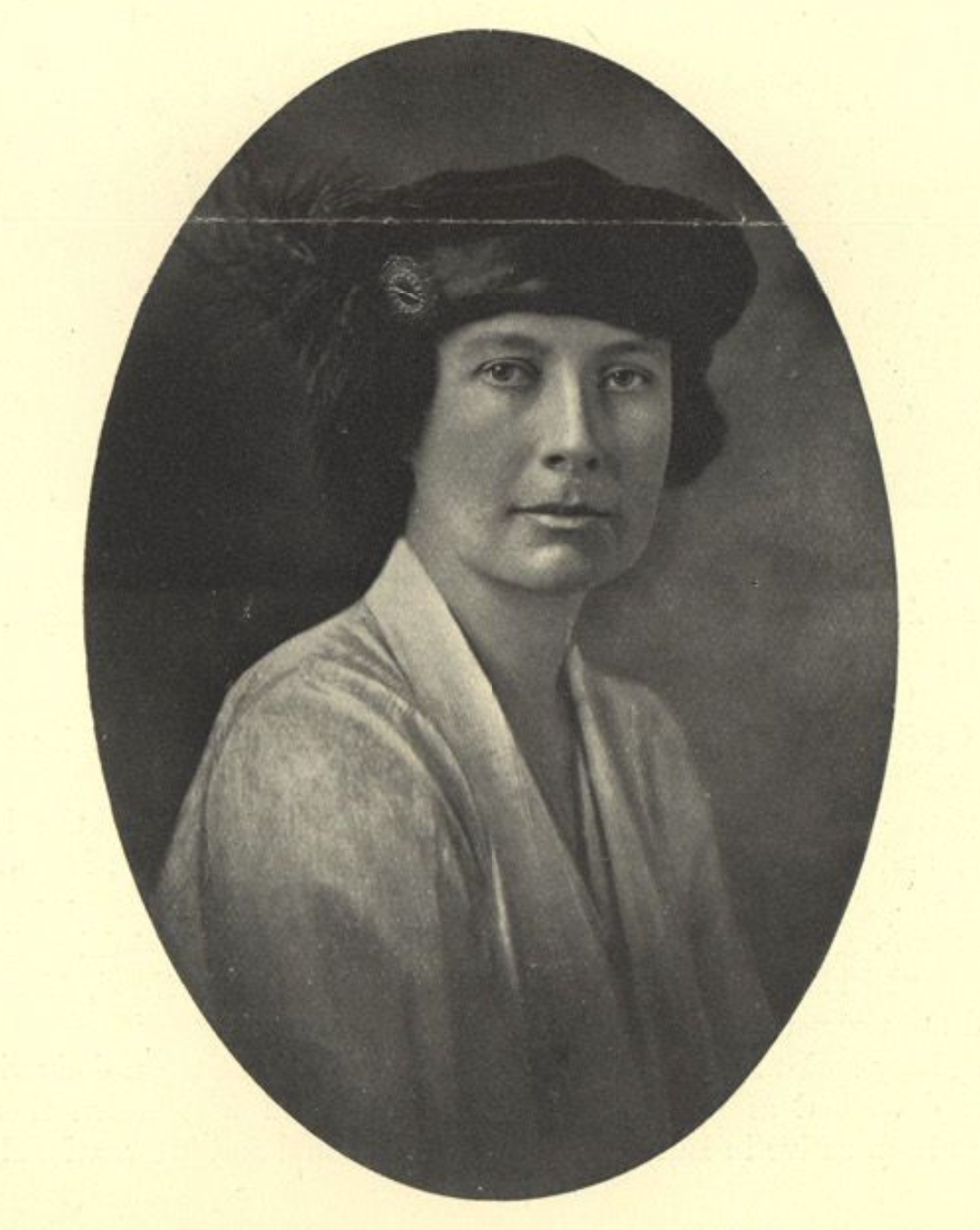
- Born: Adeline May Isabella Elliot; 7 February 1877; Selkirkshire, Scotland
- Died: 30 December 1956 (aged 79); Oxfordshire, England
- Occupation(s): Singer, dancer, and promoter of folk traditions

May Elliot Hobbs (7 February 1877 – 30 December 1956) was a Scottish singer, dancer, and promoter of folk traditions. She was a teacher, organiser, and lecturer for the English Folk Dance and Song Society, of which she was a founding member.

== Early life ==
Adeline May Isabella Elliot was born on 7 February 187 in Selkirkshire, Scotland, the eldest of three children of Jessie and Walter Elliot. Raised among the music and dance traditions of Scotland, she later went to Germany to study piano, giving performances in Britain and Europe.

Following the death of her father in 1904, May moved to London and on 28 November 1906 married Robert Hobbs, a stock-breeder and farmer in Kelmscott, Oxfordshire. The couple had one son, Robert, born in 1907. Robert Hobbs' family owned the Kelmscott manor house rented to William Morris.

== Folklorist ==
In 1908, May first met Cecil Sharp, subsequently participating in folk dance demonstrations with him and becoming a close friend. She was a founder member of the English Folk Dance Society, and involved in its committee.

In 1912, she organised a folk dance demonstration in Kelmscott, at which both William Morris' widow, Jane Morris, and daughter May were present - both of whom still lived in the village. Others travelled from the surrounding villages, and further afield. Over the next two decades, Hobbs lectured and taught across the country. In 1916, she helped folklorist Janet Blunt to collect some of the Adderbury morris dances.

Hobbs became a close friend of May Morris, her neighbour in Kelmscott. The two women were both deeply concerned with rural issues and the position of women in society. They founded Kelmscott's Women's Institute in 1916—one of the earliest Women's Institutes in the UK. Both played an active role in the life and social activities of the village.

During World War I, Hobbs worked at the Ministry of Agriculture, and in 1917 was involved with the beginning of the Women's Land Army.

In 1928, Hobbs toured the United States, spending the winter in Boston and working on behalf of the city's branch of the Folk Dance Society. The following year, she accompanied the society across Canada. In an obituary for Hobbs, the Society's journal described her as having been "an active pioneer" for its work from its origins.

Lady Denman, Chairman of the National Federation of Women's Institutes, said of Hobbs:

I know of no one with a more thorough knowledge of English country life, nor of anyone who has such a happy gift of making an interesting and inspiring speech and keeping the attention of an audience.

May Elliot Hobbs died on 30 December 1956.

== Bibliography ==
- Great Farmers, with James A. Scott Watson (1937)
