= Folkwaves =

Folkwaves is a long-running radio programme produced by BBC Radio Derby and broadcast across The East Midlands. The show is hosted by Mick Peat and Lester Simpson, and is a showcase for the very best of local, national and international folk music.

Listeners of the programme have criticised the BBC for giving only three weeks' notice before taking the programme off air.

== See also ==
- English Folk Dance and Song Society
