= Cumberland Market =

Former market in London

Coordinates: 51.5294°N 0.1425°W

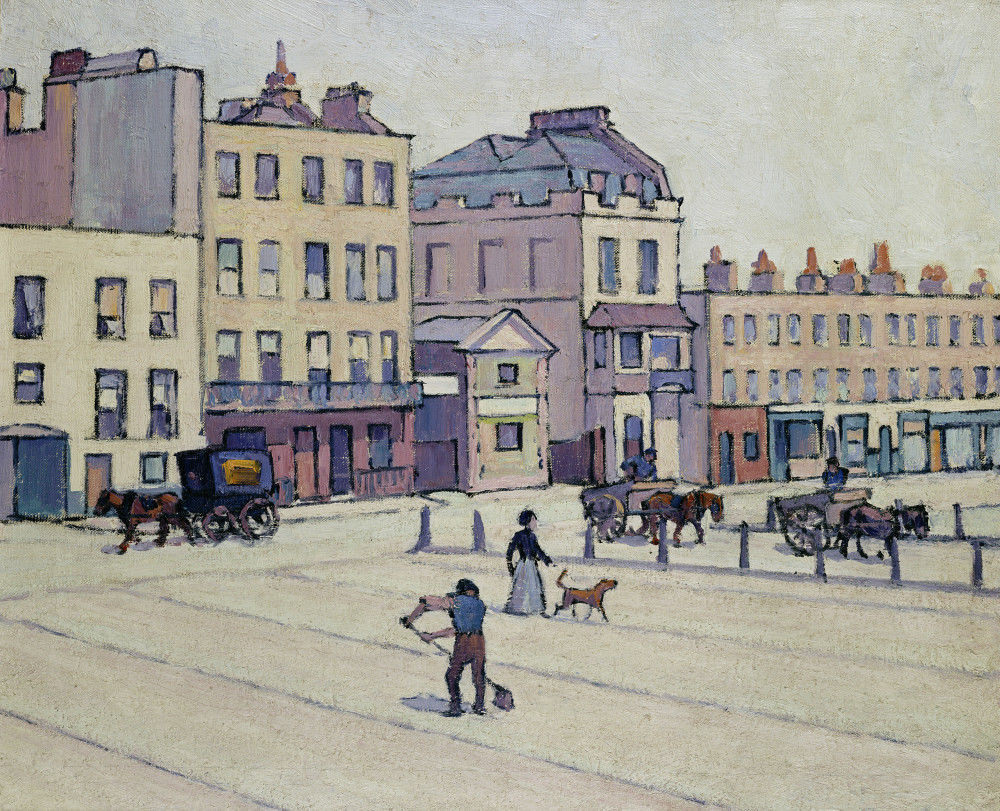
Robert Bevan. The Weigh House, Cumberland Market, c. 1914.

Cumberland Market was a London market between Regent's Park and Euston railway station. It was built in the early 19th century and was London's hay and straw market for a hundred years until the late 1920s. An arm of the Regent's Canal was built to the market. The market was surrounded by modest housing, and in the early 20th century became an artistic community. The original houses were demolished during and after World War II and it is now a housing estate, known as Regent's Park Estate.

== Origins ==
The land to the east of John Nash's Regent's Park development had originally been laid out as a service district with small houses for tradesmen and three large squares intended for the marketing of hay, vegetables and meat., Only Cumberland Market, the northernmost square survived as a commercial area. London's hay market relocated here from the Haymarket (near Piccadilly Circus) in 1830 although it was never to prove a great success, being described in 1878 as "never [having] been very largely attended".

The Regent's Canal was developed as a means of delivering goods into the North of London. It linked the Grand Junction Canal's Paddington Arm with the River Thames at Limehouse. The Cumberland Arm was built as a spur off it and led between Nash's Park Village West and Park Village East to the Cumberland Basin which was lined by a collection of wharfs and warehouses. Hay and straw were brought in for sale at the Market and for the nearby Albany Street cavalry barracks. Barges, each capable of carrying thirty tons, would also arrive with heavy goods such as stone and lime for building; coal and timber for the neighbouring coach-building and furniture trade. Ice, too, was brought in for the ice-merchant, William Leftwich, who had an icehouse that was eighty-two feet deep and with a capacity of 1,500 tons under the Market. Vegetables and cattle were carried in as well, thus reducing the need for the latter to be driven into the city.

Clarence Market, the next square to the south, was intended to be a centre for the distribution of fresh vegetables brought in from the market gardens of Middlesex. It was later cultivated as a nursery garden and became Clarence Gardens. The houses in Clarence and Cumberland Markets were modest and the work of speculative builders who put up "run-of-the-mill products without the slightest obligation to make architecture." The southernmost square began as York Market but it never found use as a trading place and the name was later changed to Munster Square. Although its houses were tiny, with a single window on each of their three storeys, they were well-designed and perfectly proportioned.

In the NW corner of Cumberland Market, in Albany Street, John Nash had built the Ophthalmic Hospital for Sir William Adams, George IV's oculist. For several years Adams gave his services free to soldiers whose eyesight had been affected in the military campaigns in Egypt. The hospital was closed in 1822 and for a time it was used as a factory for manufacturing Bacon's and Perkin's 'steam guns'. In 1826 it was purchased by Sir Goldsworthy Gurney for the construction of his famed 'steam carriages', one of which made the journey from London to Bath and back, in July 1829. However, unable to market these vehicles Gurney was forced to sell the premises in 1832. Bought by Sir Felix Booth, the gin distiller the building survived as a landmark, although badly bombed, until demolition in 1968.

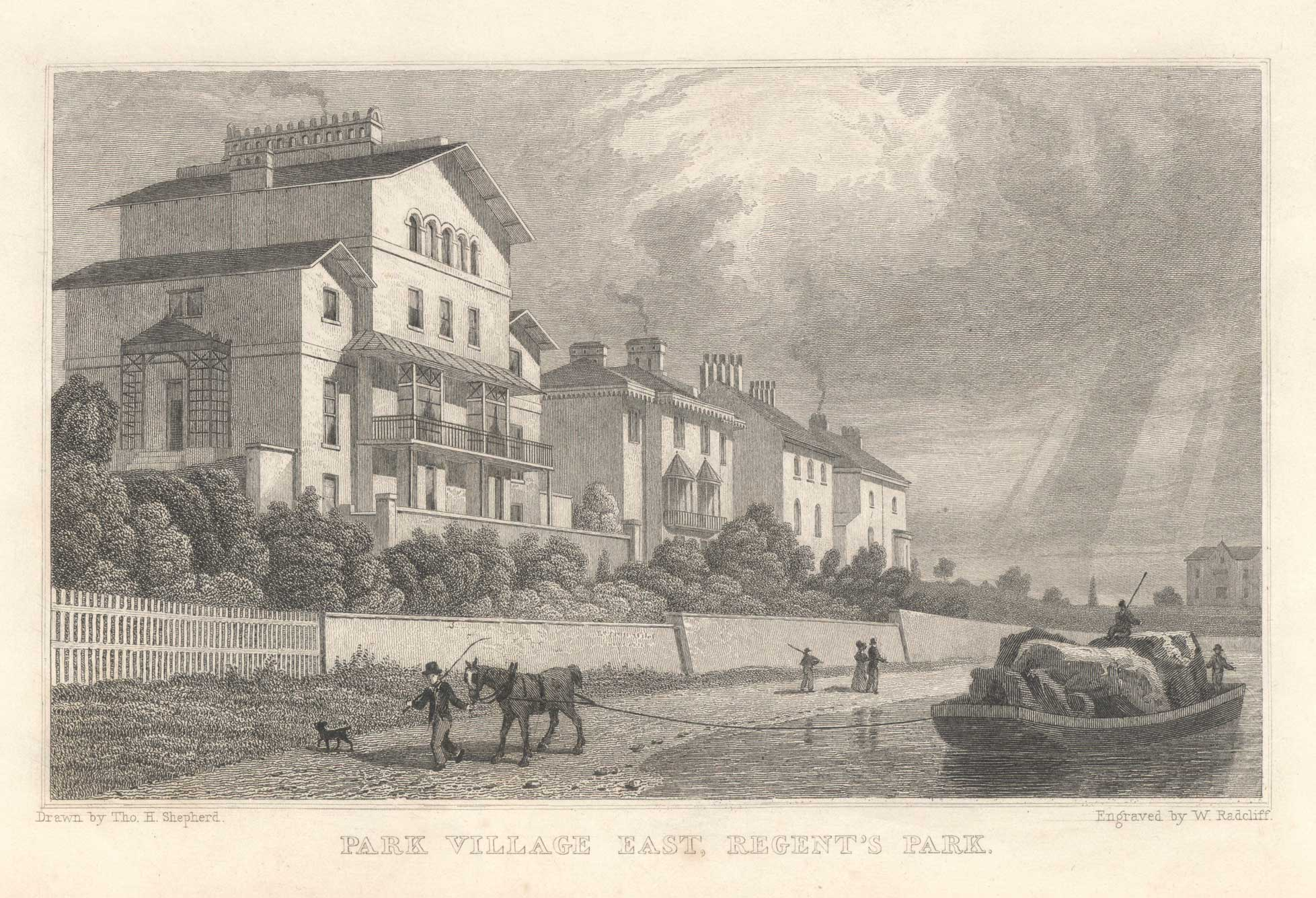
Park Village East from the Cumberland Arm. From an original study by Thomas Hosmer Shepherd (1793–1864), pub 1831. Produced from Shepherd's series "Metropolitan Improvements; or London in the Nineteenth Century".

Beside the Ophthalmic Hospital was Christ Church (now St. George's Cathedral), built by Nash's assistant, Sir James Pennethorne in 1837 to serve the largely working class district. However, a series of later alterations gradually made the church more appropriate for high-church worship, and in time the windows were filled with stained glass, including a panel by Dante Gabriel Rossetti, whose family worshipped there.

The steeple of Christ Church, dominated Cumberland Market as did the nearby chimney of William Grimble's gin distillery, also in Albany Street. In 1840 Grimble decided to embark on producing vinegar from spirit left over from the distilling process. He went into partnership with Sir Felix Booth, and they set up premises in the North East corner of the Market. The venture was unsuccessful so they turned to the more conventional method of vinegar brewing. The brewery burnt down in 1864 and was rebuilt and extended soon after.

== Growth of railways ==
The growth of the railway network and the opening of Euston Station in 1837 caused enormous upheaval and was one of the factors that led to the rapid decline of the area. Bringing in "noise, dirt, Irish navvies, and semi-itinerant railway workers" Charles Dickens likened the railway works cutting their way through Camden Town to a "great earthquake". More industry developed in the area than was originally planned as factories began to spring up near the canal and railway and this put even more pressure on land for housing. Houses that were originally built for middle-class families were taken over by incomers. The terraces of Mornington Crescent and Arlington Road, for example, were ideal for multi occupation for as many as nine or ten people could be accommodated in each.

By 1852 the Midland Railway was transporting around a fifth of the total coal to London through both Euston and King's Cross. Ironically the canal proved useful in the construction of both King's Cross and St Pancras in terms of getting the building materials to the site. Although still in use the Regent's Canal carried less and less until by the 1850s the Cumberland Basin was described as "no better than a stagnant putrid ditch". Cholera spread through the families of men who were employed on the barges and in the wharves around it and took hold in the overcrowded neighbourhood.

The housing situation was to become worse in the following decade. Some 4,000 houses were demolished in the area to the east of Cumberland Market to make way for the new St Pancras Station in 1868. As many as 32,000 people were displaced, most with no form of compensation. By the late nineteenth century a dramatic social divide had developed in this part of London with Cumberland Market in the middle. Just over one hundred metres to the west were the wealthy occupants of Nash's Chester Terrace while a short distance to the east were areas characterised by Charles Booth, the social commentator, as being occupied by the very poor, of those in "chronic want".

Throughout its existence the hay market operated for three days a week alongside a general produce market. The central cobbled market place, enclosed by cast-iron posts linked with chains, was surrounded by modest houses of varying styles. Most of the houses were of three storeys, some with a basement. Although originally they do not appear to have had shops the lower floors of many were subsequently converted to business. Twenty-one separate businesses are recorded in Cumberland Market at the beginning of the twentieth century together with four pubs.

The canal had proved to be a very efficient means of bringing in stone to the Cumberland Basin and a number of monumental masonry and statuary businesses had sprung up in the Euston Road to take advantage of this.

== Artistic community ==
As well as monumental statuary the availability of stone, combined with cheap rents and its proximity to the centre of town had attracted a number of sculptors and artists to set up studios in the Cumberland Market area. Amongst the former were Mario Raggi; John Henry Foley and Sir Thomas Brock. Sir Frederic (later Lord) Leighton also had his sculptor's studio in Osnaburgh Street.

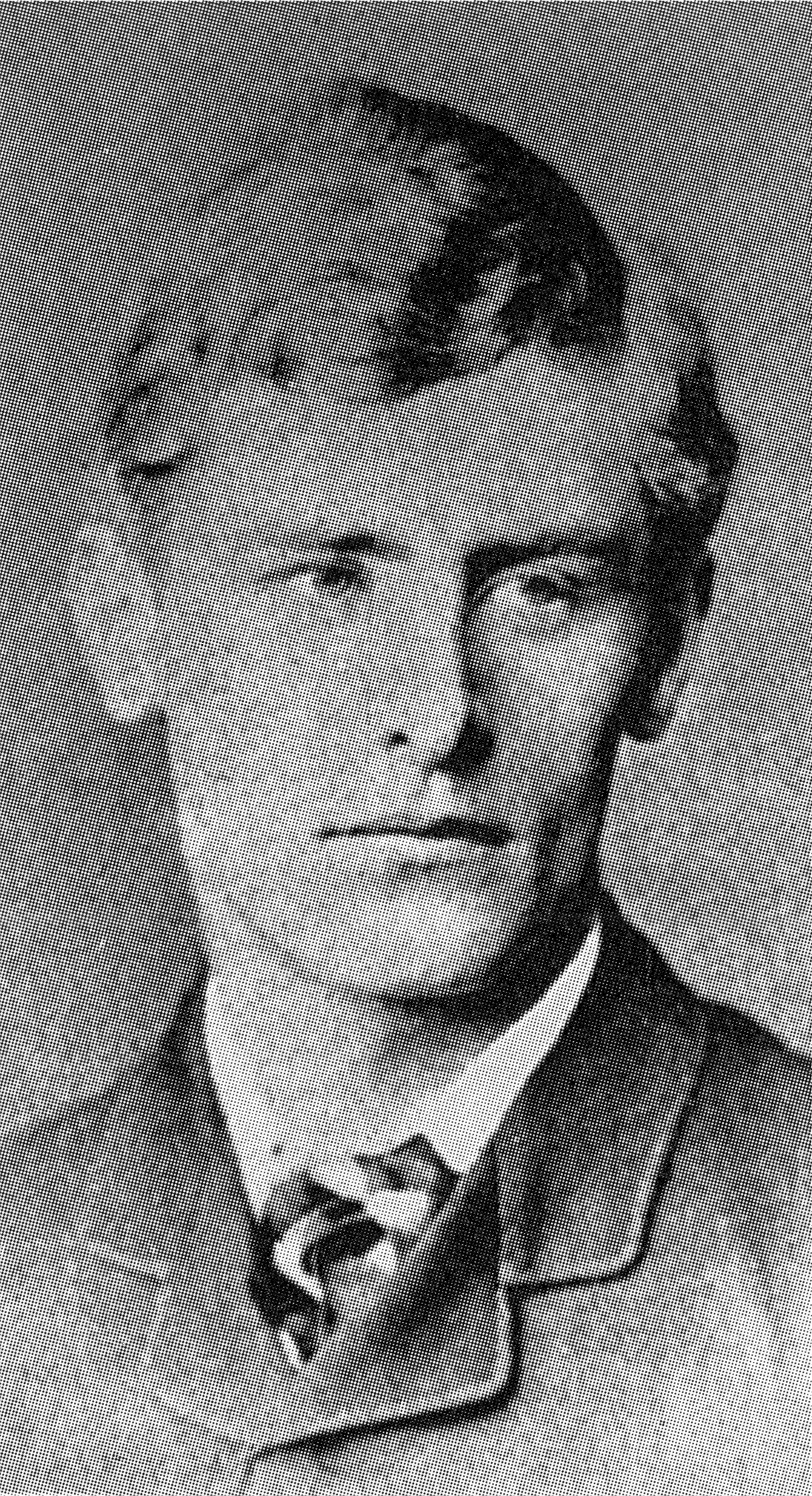
Walter Sickert in 1884.

Fred Winter, the treasurer of the New English Art Club, sculpted at No.13 Robert Street and Walter Sickert painted in the next door studio in 1894 sharing it for a while with his former master Whistler. Some years later C.R.W. Nevinson rented the same studio and it was there that he painted his works for his second exhibition of War Paintings at the Leicester Galleries of 1918.

In 1909-10 Sickert had taken a studio at No. 21 Augustus Street, which he called the "Vinegar Factory" as it had been part of Grimble's Factory. Here he taught etching. His Cumberland Market painting of ca. 1910 which was made at the south end of Augustus Street shows the side window of Charles Chase's bakers shop at No. 24 Cumberland Market.

Today Cumberland Market is best remembered as the home of Robert Bevan's Cumberland Market Group for it was in his first floor studio of No. 49 that he and his colleagues held their Saturday afternoon "At Homes" in the early days of World War I.

The artist William Roberts also worked in the Market at this time and mentioned other neighbours as having been Bernard Meninsky, John Flanagan, Colin Gill, and Geoffrey Nelson.

In her "The Hay-Market" of 1914 Charlotte Mew, the poet, gave a vivid picture of Cumberland Market and its residents. Her account of a woman walking across it with her young daughter might almost have been a description of one of Bevan's better-known paintings of this period.

Another writer attracted to the area was the American "Tramp Poet" Harry Kemp, who rented two rooms in the Market in late 1913. It was there one morning, woken from an absinthe-induced hangover, by the tap-tapping of a blind man in the Market below that he wrote "Blind".

== Social conditions ==
A few years beforehand, concerned by the poor conditions in which many were living Mary Neal, a philanthropist, set out to help girls working in the dressmaking trade. With Emmeline Pethick-Lawrence she established the Espérance Girls' Club at No. 50 Cumberland Market. This was open nearly every night of the week from 8 to 10 o'clock. One evening every week was set apart for a singing class, another for musical drill, another for games, or sewing or cooking. Having heard of Cecil Sharp's collection of folk songs in 1905 she asked him for suitable ones that might be taught to the girls. This proved to be such a success that he was asked to recommend dances to go with the songs. Within a short time the Espérance girls were putting on demonstrations around the country. Sharp collaborated with Herbert MacIlwaine, the musical director of the club, to produce the first of the Morris books.

Mary Neal had been an early supporter of the Women's Social and Political Union and the Espérance Club danced at many of their events. This proved to be one of the reasons for Sharp and Neal to fall out and although she went on to publish two Espérance Morris books, the Club closed during World War I.

The theme of social change remained strong in Cumberland Market, for in 1916 Miss M.M. Jeffery, who had been the reformer Octavia Hill's secretary, took over three rooms at No. 42. She had been appointed to manage the Cumberland Market (London) Estate of the Commissioners of Crown Lands (later the Crown Estate Commissioners). This was an estate 'of about 850 houses divided into about 2,000 tenancies, occupied by a population of about 7,000'.

== Decline ==
A market continued on the site right up until the late 1920s, and the last trading barges ceased sometime in 1930. Local businesses were in terminal decline and by 1931 only five remained and the King's Head was the sole surviving pub. In the same year the buildings on the north side of the market were demolished, including Grimble's Vinegar Factory, and replaced by council housing.

In August 1938 the Cumberland Basin was dammed off and drained and in the next two years it was formally abandoned. By 15 January 1941 the basin had been filled in with rubble from London's bombing and in the years following World War II the site was covered with topsoil and turned into allotments.

Being so close to both Euston and King's Cross stations it was inevitable that the area would have been so heavily bombed during World War II. A V1 rocket landed on the NE corner in 1944 and the buildings on the SE corner were damaged beyond repair. General blast damage was also sustained in the SW corner.

The remaining buildings were demolished in 1950 and in 1951 the Crown Estate Commissioners sold the 32 acres (130,000 m^{2}) on which Munster Square, Clarence Gardens and Cumberland Market stood to St Pancras Borough Council for the building of a housing estate, known as Regent's Park Estate.
