= Douglas Kennedy (folk dancer) =

Scottish folk musician and dancer

Douglas Neil Kennedy (1893–1988) was a folk musician, dancer and a key figure in the 20th century English folk dance revival.

== Early life ==
Kennedy was born in Edinburgh and educated at George Watson's College, Edinburgh, and the Mercers' School, London.

== Folk-dance ==
In 1911 Kennedy was introduced to folk-dancing by his sister Helen. At the time, he was studying science at South-Western Polytechnic, which was the base for Cecil Sharp's English Folk Dance Society (EFDS). Kennedy became the youngest member of the new society's demonstration dance team.

After completing his studies in Botany at Imperial College, he remained in the Department of Botany there as a demonstrator.

In 1914 he married Helen May Karpeles, a founder member of the EFDS, and sister of Maud Pauline Karpeles, secretary of the EFDS. In the First World War Kennedy served with the 14th battalion London Scottish regiment, then with the Royal Defence Corps. He reached the rank of captain and was awarded the MBE. Of the seven regular dancers from the EFDS's demonstration dance team, four were killed in the war.

== Growing involvement in EFDS ==
At the end of war in 1918 Kennedy was elected an EFDS committee member. On Cecil Sharp's death in 1924, Kennedy succeeded him as director of the EFDS. In 1930, under Kennedy's Directorship, the building begun of Cecil Sharp House, the EFDS's headquarters.

Maud Karpeles, Kennedy's sister-in-law, Secretary of the EFDS and Cecil Sharp's literary executor, was a key figure in the EFDS's organisation. She resigned in 1928, citing difficulties in distinguishing the functions of the roles of secretary and director. In 1932 the EFDS merged with the Folk-Song Society to create the English Folk Dance and Song Society (EFDSS).

Kennedy led EFDSS dance teams on international tours and in 1937, whilst visiting the United States to direct a Pinewoods Camp summer school, he began collecting American square dances. He introduced them to England at a summer school in 1938 and in 1939 published with his wife, Square Dances of America. In the same year he and his wife, with Nan and Brian Fleming-Williams, formed the Square Dance Band. This band consisted of drum, guitar, fiddle, and concertina and set the standard and pattern for all subsequent folk-dance band playing.

In 1938 Kennedy had also been elected as squire (president) of the Morris Ring – created by men's Morris teams partly to promote Morris dancing. Kennedy planned to step down as squire – and resign as director of the EFDSS – in 1940 and emigrate to the United States, but his plans altered at the outbreak of the Second World War. During the war Kennedy was a flight lieutenant in the Air Ministry – and was absent on war work when a bomb destroyed the EFDSS headquarters in 1940.

== Post-war period ==
Resuming full directorship of the EFDSS at the end of the war, Kennedy scripted and presented the first regular folk-dance radio programme, which was broadcast on the BBC in 1946. It has been argued that Kennedy's leadership of the EFDSS marked a move away from the strict pedagogy of its origins to an organisation more engaged in participation (for instance, the EFDSS's examination structure was abolished in 1956).

== Retirement and honours ==
Kennedy was appointed OBE in 1952 and he remained as director of the EFDSS until 1961. He continued to be active in folk circles, serving as President of the Folklore Society from 1964 to 1967 and vice-president of the International Folk Music Council from 1975 to 1977.
