= Espérance Club =

English trade union for girl dressmakers

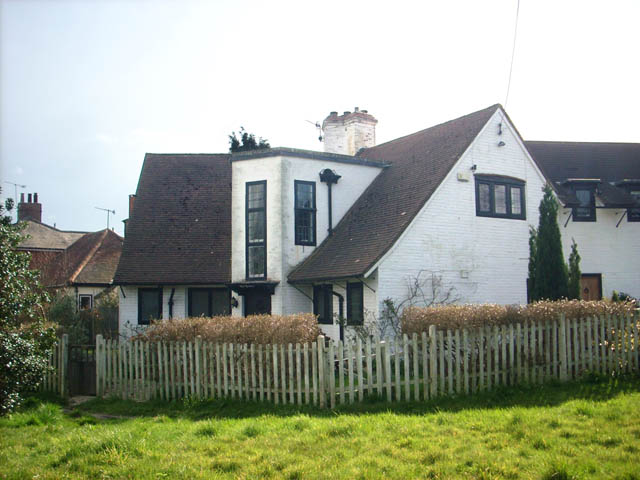
"The Sundial" built in 1903 for Mr and Mrs Pethick Lawrence in South Holmwood as a country home for the Espérance Club for working-class London girls. It was subsequently owned/occupied by author and journalist John Langdon-Davies. A sundial with the motto, "Let others tell of storms and showers, I tell of sunny morning hours", is on the south-east wall

The Espérance Club, and the Maison Espérance dressmaking cooperative, were founded in the mid-1890s by Emmeline Pethick-Lawrence and Mary Neal in response to distressing conditions for girls in the London dress trade. The club was based at 50 Cumberland Market, in the St Pancras area of London.

Mary Neal had become fascinated by the folk songs and dances being collected by Cecil Sharp, and invited William Kimber, a musician and dancer from Headington Quarry in Oxfordshire, to teach morris dancing to the young women of the Espérance Club. Thus was born the Espérance Morris, which inspired a modern London women's side, New Esperance Morris.

After donating a £1,000 legacy to the club and meeting Emmeline Pethick-Lawrence, Lady Constance Lytton was enthused by the women's movement and thus became a leading suffragette activist.
