= Kinor =

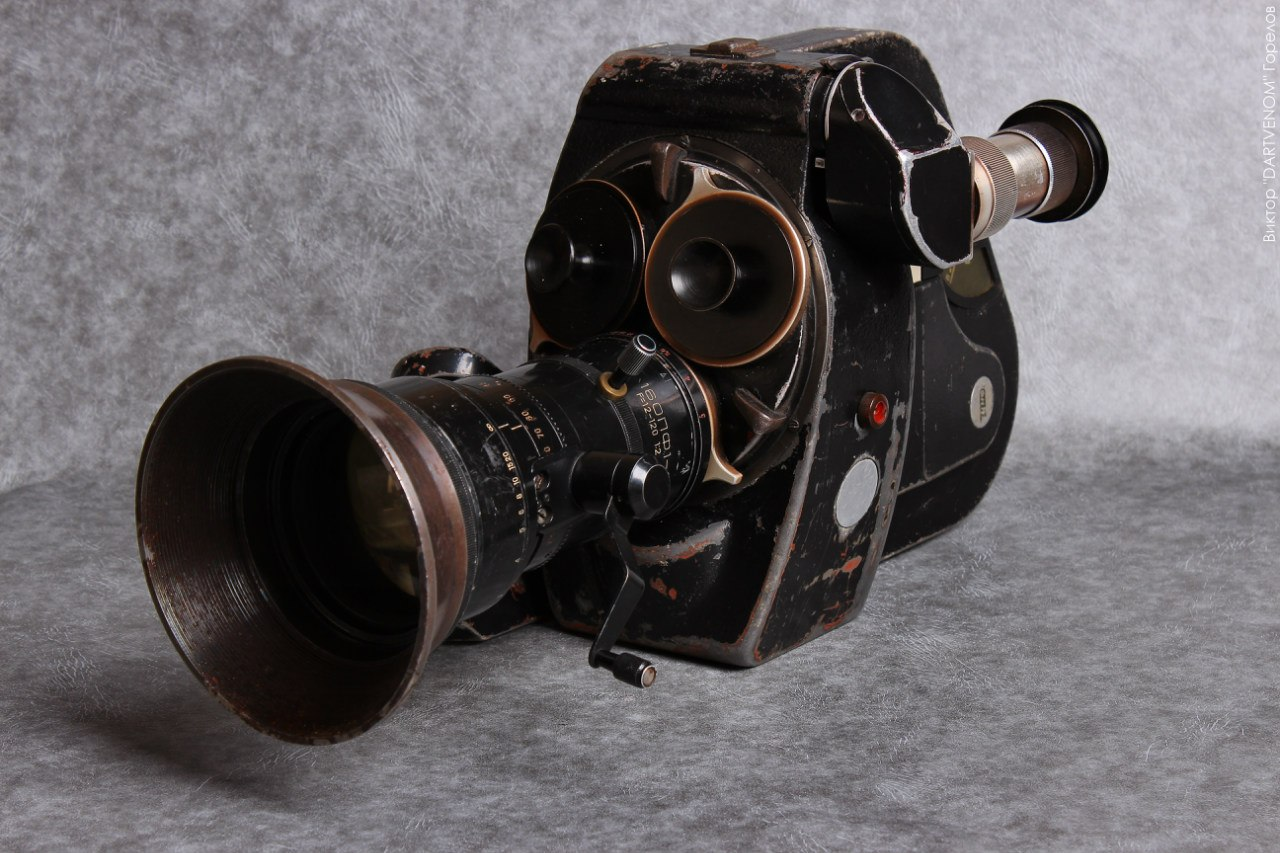
- Kinor 16 CX-2M with a 12-120mm lens
- Variant models: 16SP, 16SX-1M, 16SX-2M
- Manufacturer: KMZ
- Introduced: 1958
- Gauge: 16mm
- Movement: motor
- Lens mount: proprietary, various
- Shutter: mirror shutter
- Magazines: rear mounted, 30m and 120m
- Magazine loading: fixed loop, geared
- Film cores: standard cores, removable platter allows use of daylight reels in 30m magazine

16SP/SP-M
- Manufacturer: KMZ
- Introduced: 1958
- Speed: 8-64 FPS, forward and reverse
- Motor: DC, optional crystal-sync motor
- Lens mount: 16SP aka Krasnogorsk
- Shutter: reflex mirror, 30-170deg
- Viewfinder: through lens, fixed
- Magazines: rear mounted, 30m and 120m

Kinor is the name of a line of movie cameras produced in the USSR. All cameras under the Kinor name were intended for professional use and were equipped with a through-the-lens viewfinder with a mirror shutter, but were otherwise unrelated in their technical design as they were created by a variety of different organizations.

== KMZ 16-SP ==
The KMZ 16-SP was the first reflex 16mm camera built in Russia. It is commonly mistaken for Kinor, whereas it was built by KMZ. It is essentially a copy of the Arriflex 16ST, with a three-lens turret and a fixed straight viewfinder tube. Unlike the 16ST, however, the 16-SP uses interchangeable magazines by default (where the Arri camera requires modification). Electric drive, removable electric motor, 6-8V 8A, powered by alkaline batteries type KN-10. Speeds 8-64 fps, forward and reverse. Meter and frame counters in the camera. OKS type lenses: F=10;15;25;50;75mm, mount: Krasnogorsk mount. Charging with cassettes of 30 meters (4 pcs), 60 meters (3 pcs), film in rolls on standard cores. The shutter is mirrored, with a variable angle of 30-170 degrees. Includes compendium shade and set of filters. For sound-sync filming, a blimp and a synchronous electric drive were produced. Disadvantage: the cassettes do not have a meter counter.

16CX-M
- Manufacturer: Moskinap
- Introduced: 1965
- Movement: single pulldown claw with registration pin
- Speed: 10-EPSS: 25 FPS 11-EPSS: 24FPS 28-EPSS: 8-64 FPS 29-EPSS: 25 FPS
- Motor: 10-, 11-EPSS: AC synchronous 28-, 29-EPSS: 12V DC crystal sync
- Lens mount: OST-19-144, three-port turret
- Shutter: reflex mirror, 70-170deg
- Viewfinder: through lens, rotatable and extensible
- Magazines: rear mounted, 30m and 120m

16CX-2M
- Manufacturer: Moskinap
- Introduced: 1965
- Movement: single pulldown claw with registration pin
- Speed: 10-EPSS: 25 FPS 11-EPSS: 24FPS 28-EPSS: 8-64 FPS 29-EPSS: 25 FPS
- Motor: 10-, 11-EPSS: AC synchronous 28-, 29-EPSS: 12V DC crystal sync
- Lens mount: OST-19-144, single port
- Shutter: reflex mirror, fixed
- Viewfinder: through lens, rotatable and extensible
- Magazines: rear mounted, 30m and 120m

== Kinor 16 CX series Cine Camera ==
The Kinor prototype was created in 1965 by the MKBK, or Moskinap, manual narrow-film apparatus 16СХ of the original design. However, large-scale production was established only ten years after the modernization. Two versions were produced: the turret "Kinor" 16СХ-М with a revolving head for three interchangeable lenses, and 16СХ-2М, designed for one interchangeable lens. The cameras were intended for synchronous filming of television plots, since video cameras for television journalism did not yet exist in the USSR . Unlike the turret model, which was equipped with an shutter with an adjustable opening angle, the shutter of the 16CX-2M model was non-adjustable, which simplified the design and made it more reliable. The last model was equipped with a tenfold professional 16OPF1-2M-01 zoom lens with a focal length range of 12–120 mm and a wide-angle lens of 10 mm. The other configuration included a 16OPF12-1s varifocal lens and a 0.75 × wide-angle attachment . The device made it possible to use the majority of cinematographic lenses in a standard frame, including those from old-style Krasnogorsk cameras with a bayonet mount . On the basis of the 16СХ family, a tripod-shoulder synchronous camera 2СР was developed with a built-in device for recording an audio on the magnetic track of a film.

== Brief Details ==
The 16mm Kinor 16CX-M has a turret-type lens mounting and a variable shutter. The 2M and the rare 3M models are supplied with a 10-100 zoom lens, which has front- and rear-mountable filters. The usual kit consists of four magazines, three 100-foot, and one 400-foot. Synchronized sound is achieved using a sync-pulse known as a pilot tone, and the motor generates an accurate 25 frames per second to attain this. Variable frame rates require a relatively cheap modification form third-party developers, or the factory-produced variable drive unit. This is very quickly and simply replaced. It is common to see this type of modification coupled with the addition of true crystal-sync.

The cameras’ use in the West is gaining popularity as filmmakers grow accustomed to Russian manufacturing quality. Compared with the Krasnogorsk series of Russian cameras, the build quality is of a higher standard, although these too are well-designed units. Their price compared with the benchmark Arri series film cameras is drastically cheaper; this is partly the reason new filmmakers are finding themselves the owners of these very practical film cameras.

The 35-millimeter Kinors are self-blimped and have been used to make films worldwide.

There is a wide range of LOMO lenses produced for the Kinor 16.

and a wide angle adapter which attaches to both lenses which lends a 7.5–75 mm range to the 16 OPF 12-1 and a 9–90 mm range to the 16 OPF 1-2M-01.

== Technical Details ==
The 16SX-2M apparatus was equipped with a one-sided single-tooth grab with a single-tooth counter- grab and a lower-mounted mirror shutter with a constant opening angle. The design made it possible to shoot on film with both one-sided and double-sided perforation . Quick-change magazine type cassettes with a capacity of 30 and 120 meters were designed for film rolls wound on standard cores 16 × 50. Daylight 100 ft spools could be placed in the magazine by removing the "platters", as per the image to the right. It seems commonly recommend not to use metal spools as if they rub against the inside of the magazine, audio recording might be difficult.

The view finder with a magnification of 9.5 ×, equipped with a diopter adjustment, could rotate 360 ° in one plane without compensating for the image rotation. The rotation of the magnifier provided comfortable sighting at low or excessively high positions of the apparatus, but at the same time the observed image was rotated at an angle corresponding to the rotation of the magnifier. In addition to turning, the magnifier could be pulled out of the housing for adjustment to the operator's left eye. Focusing was carried out according to the image on frosted glass or distance scales on the lenses.

The design of the drive is removable, which made it possible to use various types. The main DC electric drive 29EPSS was powered by a block of 8 SCS-5 batteries, carried on the operator's shoulder, and was designed for 25 frames per second. Additionally, 28EPSS drives were produced with a wider range of 8–64 frames per second, and AC (power point) powered drives 10EPS and 11EPS, designed for 24 and 25 frames per second, respectively. All drives are equipped with a "pilot-tone", which provided synchronization to a recording device to record synchronous audio. "Kinor" 16СХ-2М had a low noise level of the mechanism 42 dB and was suitable for synchronous shooting. In modern usage, a 12 volt motorcycle battery would commonly supply ample charge to run a Kinor camera. Higher fps speeds may require a higher watt battery output.

With the advent of portable video cameras, which were more convenient than filming devices in television production, the 16 mm Kinor series cameras were replaced by them. Currently, there are improved versions of these devices, equipped with TVs, PL mount and digitally controlled electric drives. There are also devices with an enlarged frame window, adapted to the " Super-16 " format.
