= Albany Street =

Street in London

Coordinates: 51°31′49″N 0°8′40″W

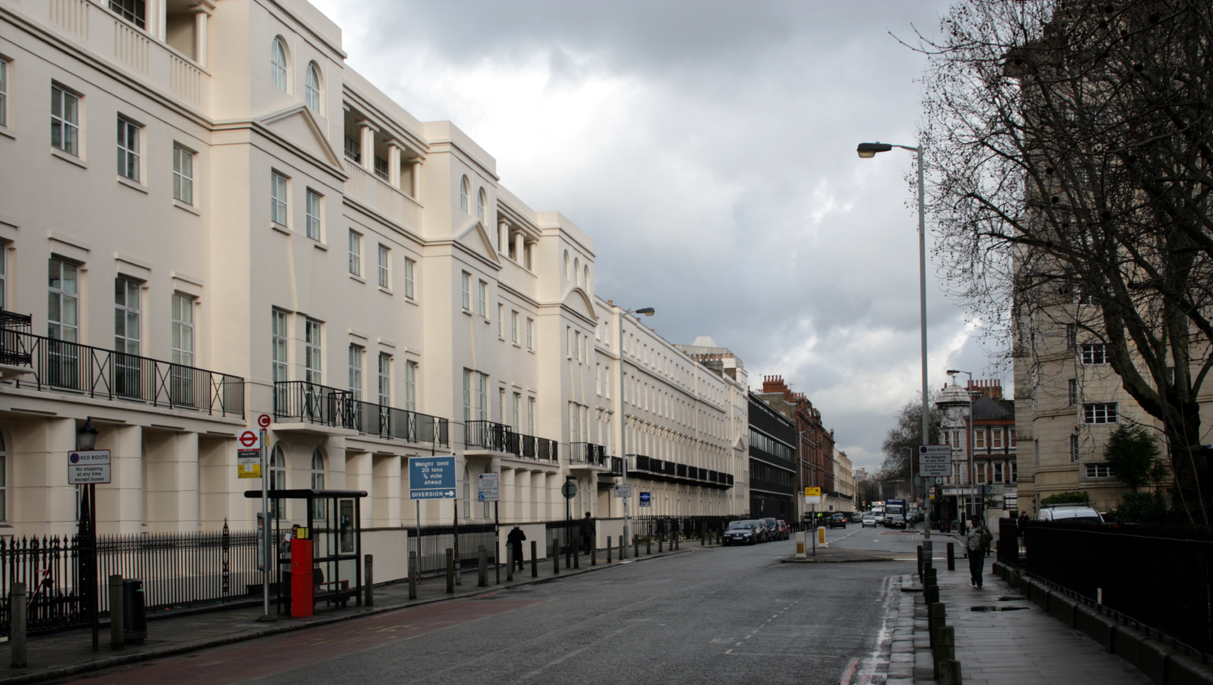
Albany Street

Albany Street is a road in London running from Marylebone Road to Gloucester Gate following the east side of Regent's Park. It is about three-quarters of a mile in length.

== History ==
The street was laid out during the 1820s, and takes its name from Prince Frederick, Duke of York and Albany, the younger brother of King George IV.

The freeholds of the west side of the street are owned by the Crown Estate, as part of Regent's Park. The southern part of the east side of the street is part of the Regent's Park Estate.

The building numbering system has odd numbers on the west side, and even numbers on the east. At the Marylebone Road end is the Holy Trinity Church. Adjacent is The White House, formerly a block of luxury flats, it is now a hotel named The Melia White House. Both stand on traffic islands to themselves. Numbers 31 and 33 are Grade I listed buildings, designed by John Nash. Between 35 and 55 there is an inserted street. This area was occupied by a huge construction called "The Colosseum" designed by Decimus Burton. It was demolished in 1875, and replaced by houses called "Colosseum Terrace" in 1878.

At 55 there is a blue plaque dedicated to the social researcher and reformist Henry Mayhew. On the east side is the former Anglican church of Christ Church, Albany Street which contains a stained-glass window by Dante Gabriel Rossetti. At 152-4 was an ophthalmic hospital designed by John Nash; this was replaced by the "Regents Park Manufactory" where Goldsworthy Gurney built his steam carriages, while also working as a surgeon. The site is now occupied by a pub called "The Victory". At 166, the poet Christina Rossetti lived for a couple of years. Also on the east side is the Regent's Park Barracks. At 197 there is a blue plaque dedicated to the composer Constant Lambert, who lived and died there with his wife, the painter and designer Isabel Nicholas (later Rawsthorne).

Finally there is a blue plaque for the author W. W. Jacobs. He lived at 15 Gloucester Gate, but for some reason the plaque has been placed on Albany Street, at the back entrance to his house.
