= Mary Neal =

Mary Neal CBE JP
- Born: Clara Sophia Neal; 5 June 1860; Edgbaston, Birmingham, England
- Died: 22 June 1944 (aged 84)
- Occupation: Social worker
- Known for: Folk dance collection

Mary Neal CBE JP (born Clara Sophia Neal; 5 June 1860 – 22 June 1944) was an English social worker, suffragette and collector of English folk dances.

Neal was born in Edgbaston, Birmingham, to a prosperous family. Her father was David Neal, a button manufacturer. In 1888, she began voluntary social work with the West London Methodist Mission of Hugh Price Hughes, helping the poor of Soho, Fitzrovia, and Marylebone in London, taking the name "Sister Mary". Neal set up and ran a "Club for Working Girls" at the mission's Cleveland Hall, and also wrote for the Mission Magazine. According to Emmeline Pethick, who worked with her in the Girls' Club, Neal had "a strong sense of humour and a profound aversion from unreality; she had also a sharp tongue".

Neal said of the Girls' Club,

No words can express the passionate longing which I have to bring some of the beautiful things of life within easy reach of the girls who earn their living by the sweat of their brow... If these Clubs are up to the ideal which we have in view, they will be living schools for working women, who will be instrumental in the near future, in altering the conditions of the class they represent.

The Girls' Club was a great success, but in the autumn of 1895, Neal and Pethick left the mission to set up their own Espérance Club for girls in Cumberland Market, as they wanted to escape from the mission's institutional constraints and to experiment with dance and drama. They also started the Maison Espérance tailoring establishment to provide employment.

In 1905, Neal met Cecil Sharp at the Hampstead Conservatoire. She and Sharp began to collaborate during a revival of English folk music, in which Neal felt that the working girls of London would be able to reclaim their heritage. The girls of the Espérance Club became in demand as teachers of folk music in London and further afield and they also put on several public performances in London.

Neal and Lily Montagu, who sponsored a club for Jewish working girls, bought a house in Littlehampton, Sussex, in 1925 and called it "Green Bushes", and it became a holiday home for girls. She also went to the United States between 1910 and early 1912 to promote folk dancing.

Neal became a socialist, following Keir Hardie and Edward Carpenter. In 1899, she attended the London International Congress of Women. In 1906, Neal and Emmeline Pethick-Lawrence went to a meeting in the Chelsea home of Sylvia Pankhurst, where the Women's Social and Political Union (WSPU) was established. Neal joined the WSPU, and later she joined a group for women and men, militants and non-militants started with Agnes Harben and others, the United Suffragists.

Neal was a leading member of the Kibbo Kift youth organisation. She was a justice of the peace in West Sussex in 1934, dealing with child delinquency, and also became a member of the Howard League for Penal Reform. Her services to the English folk song and dance movement led to her being appointed Commander of the Order of the British Empire (CBE) in 1937.

== Bibliography ==
- Neal, Mary (1908). Set to Music. Association for the Revival and Practice of Folk Music.
- Buckley, Reginald Ramsden; Neal, Mary; Benson, Frank Robert (1911). The Shakespeare Revival and the Stratford-upon-Avon Movement.
- Neal, Mary (1910). The Espérance Morris Book: A Manual of Morris Dances, Folk-songs, and Singing Games. J. Curwen.
- Kidson, Frank; Neal, Mary (1915). English Folk-Song and Dance. Cambridge University Press. ISBN 978-1-107-69825-3.
- Kathryn Atherton: Mary Neal and the suffragettes who saved morris dancing, Barnsley; Yorkshire, PA : Pen & Sword History, 2024, ISBN 978-1-3990-6150-6
