= Kinora =

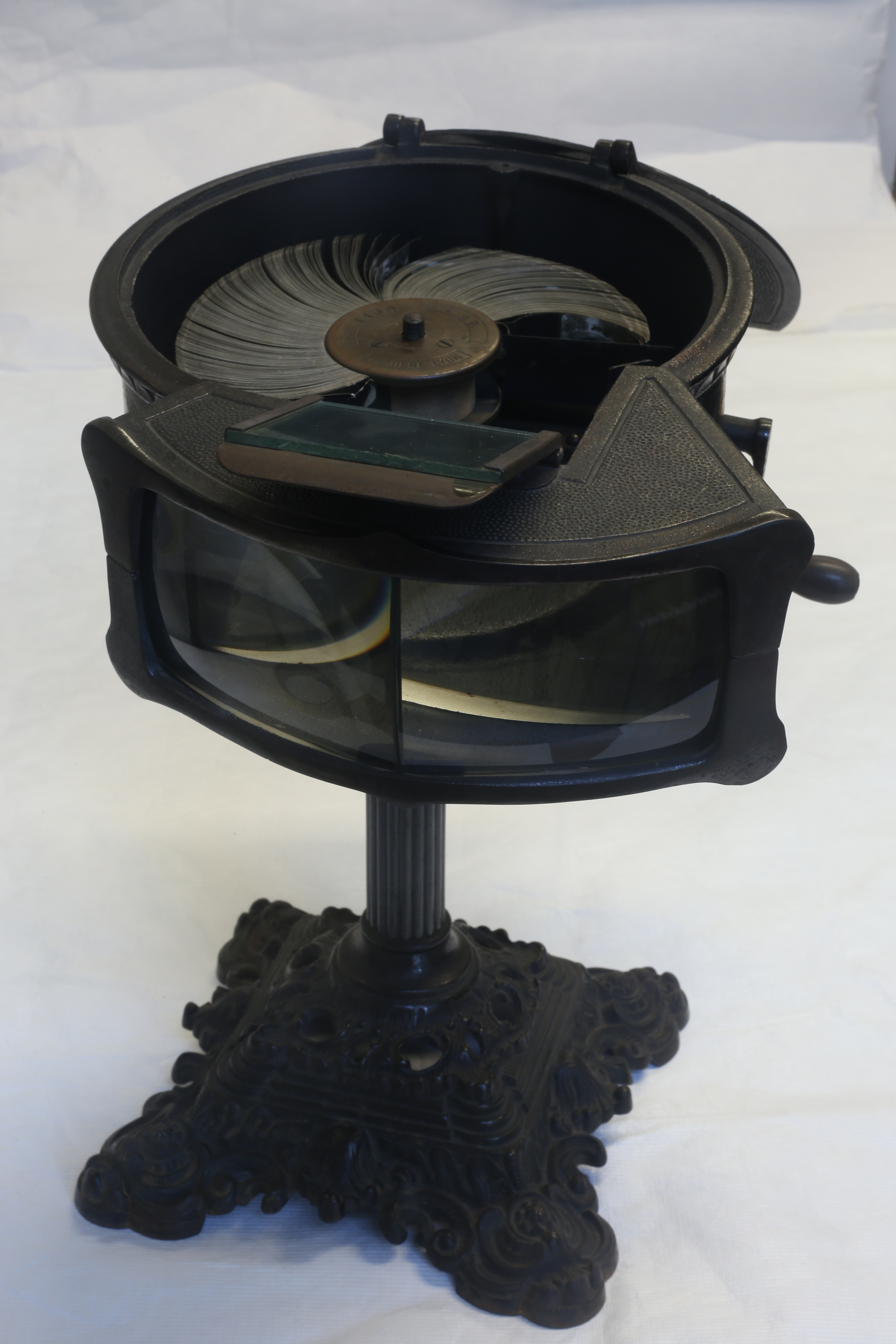
A 1905 Kinora at Fotomuseum Antwerp

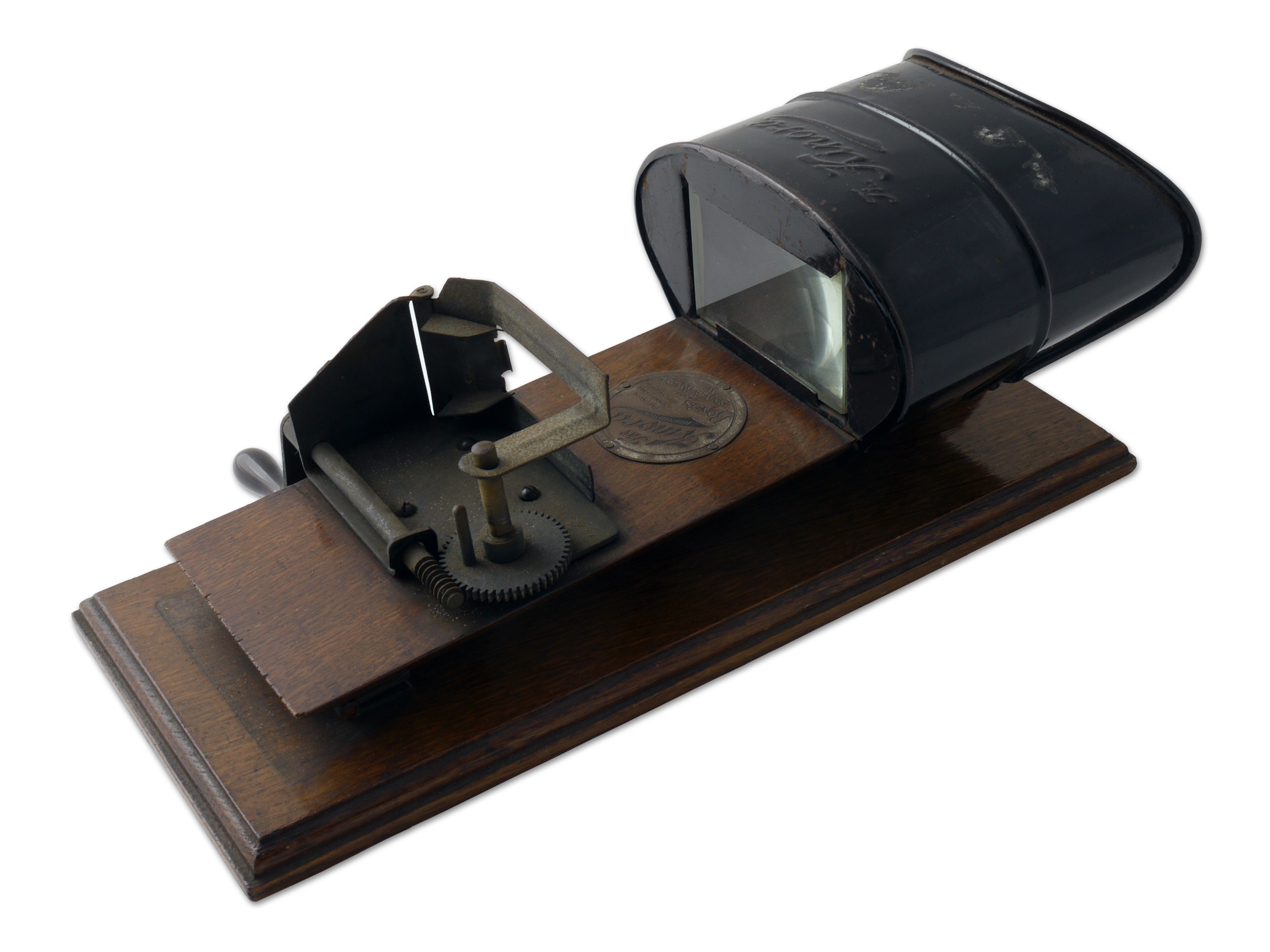
"The Rinoral", also known as Kinora, collection Huis van Alijn

The Kinora was an early motion picture device developed by the French inventors Auguste and Louis Lumière in 1895, while simultaneously working on the Cinematograph. It was patented in February 1896.

Basically a miniature version of the mutoscope for home use, the Kinora worked very much like a flip book in the shape of a Rolodex. It used conventional monochrome photographic prints fixed to strong, flexible cards attached to a circular core. A reel was revolved handle by turning a handle, making the pictures flip over against a static peg one by one. The moving pictures could be viewed through an eyepiece.

The Cinematograph proved very successful so the Lumières did not bother with the Kinora but passed the idea on to Gaumont, who marketed the device and about a hundred different reels around 1900.

The British rights to the Kinora were bought by The British Mutoscope & Biograph Co. in 1898, but the machine was not marketed in the UK until 1902. It became popular in the UK and over 12 different viewer models and over 600 reels were produced. Biograph had constructed a studio in London in 1900 to film moving portraits of families and individuals. Flip books of 60 pictures in standard Mutoscope size were produced there as Bio-Gems, before a Kinora reel portrait service became available in 1903.

In May 1907 Biograph chairman W.T. Smedley set up Kinora Limited in London. The company introduced the first amateur Kinora camera in 1908, using rolls of photographic paper or celluloid one inch (2.5 cm) wide that could be sent to the company for processing. A Kinora Grand for reels of 1,000 pictures of 2 1/2" by 3" also featured in their advertising booklet. By 1914, when the company's London factory burned down, public interest in the Kinora had declined, as the cinema screen now held greater attractions. The company did not rebuild the factory.
