= Ukulele Orchestra of Great Britain =

English musical ensemble

Ukulele Orchestra of Great Britain in 2018
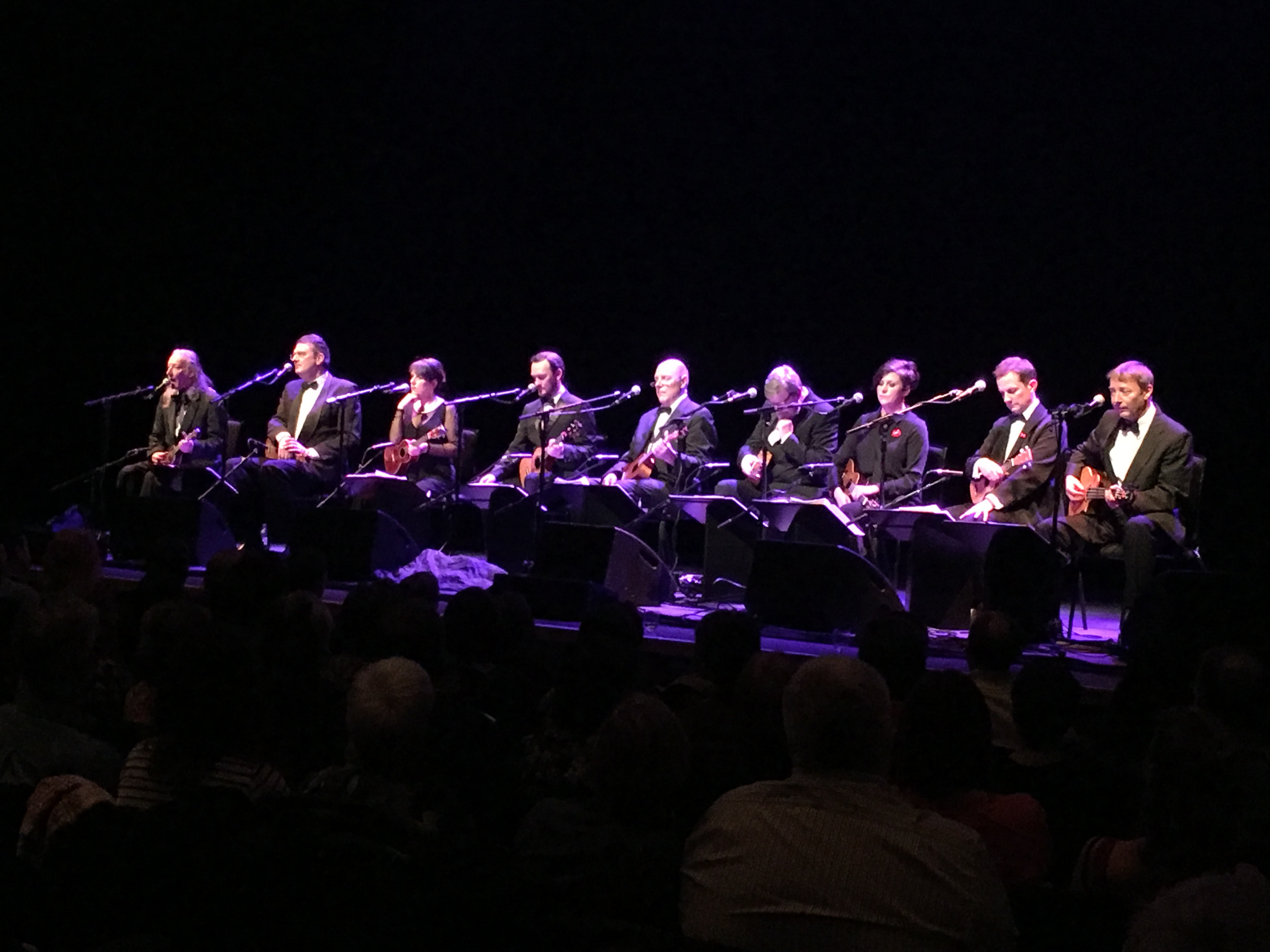
- The Ukulele Orchestra of Great Britain at the Concert For Kitty, at the Barbican Centre, London in 2018. A concert that celebrated the life of the orchestra's co-founder Kitty Lux. From Left to Right: Dave Suich, Peter Brooke-Turner, Hester Goodman, Ben Rouse, George Hinchliffe, Richie Williams, Leisa Rea, Will Grove White, Jonty Bankes.

Background information
- Also known as: UOGB, The Ukes, The Ukulele Orchestra of Great Britain
- Origin: London, England
- Genres: Eclectic and wide range of popular music and art music genres, music comedy
- Years active: 1985–present
- Label: Independent
- Members: George Hinchliffe; Dave Suich; Richie Williams; Hester Goodman; Will Grove-White; Jonty Bankes; Peter Brooke Turner; Leisa Rea; David Bowie; Ewan Wadrop; Ben Rouse; Guy Hargreaves; Laurie Higgins; Laura Currie
- Past members: Kitty Lux (1985–2017)
- Website: www.ukuleleorchestra.com

Theme to The Good, The Bad and The Ugly
Sample of the Ukulele Orchestra of Great Britain playing the main theme of the Film.

The Ukulele Orchestra of Great Britain (UOGB) is a British musical ensemble founded in 1985 by George Hinchliffe and Kitty Lux. The orchestra features ukuleles of various sizes and registers from soprano to bass. The UOGB is best known for performing musically faithful but often tongue-in-cheek covers of popular songs and musical pieces from a wide variety of music genres taken "from the rich pageant of western music". The songs are often performed with a reinterpretation, sometimes with a complete genre twist, or well known songs from multiple genres are seamlessly woven together. Songs are introduced with light hearted deadpan humour, and juxtaposition is a feature of their act, the members of the orchestra wear semi-formal (black tie) evening dress and sit behind music stands, in a parody of a classical ensemble.

The UOGB has purposely remained an independent music group, unsigned to any record label. Along with Lux and Hinchliffe, David Suich and Ritchie Williams are original members; Hester Goodman, Will Grove-White, Jonty Bankes, Peter Brooke Turner joined in the early 1990s, Leisa Rea joined in 2003, Ben Rouse in 2014 and Laura Currie in 2021. Lux died in 2017, two years after retiring from the orchestra due to chronic ill health. Over the years the UOGB has released over 30 albums, but have spent most of their time touring around the world.

The UOGB has consistently received critical praise from the media for its concerts. The Ukulele Orchestra of Great Britain has been called "not only a national institution, but also a world-wide phenomenon". The UOGB has also often been credited for being largely responsible for the current world-wide resurgence in popularity of the ukulele and ukulele groups.

== Formation ==
The Ukulele Orchestra of Great Britain (UOGB) was formed in London in 1985 when the multi-instrumentalist and musicologist George Hinchliffe gave his friend the post-punk singer Kitty Lux a ukulele for her birthday, after she had expressed an interest in learning more about harmony. After first playing together, they purchased a few ukuleles for some of their friends, including David Suich and Richie Williams. Williams recalled that his first ukulele cost "£17 with wholesale discount". Hinchliffe named the new musical group with a deliberate oxymoron, 'The Ukulele Orchestra of Great Britain', "and suddenly we were the world's first ukulele orchestra". The ukulele was selected for its musical versatility rather than its novelty value. Hinchliffe informed The Chicago Tribune that the original idea included turning a derided instrument which lacked a serious repertoire of its own into a respected concert instrument. It was an "outsider instrument" with a "blank slate" that was not limited by the conventions of either classical or rock music.

Hinchliffe explains to the Chicago Tribune why the Ukulele was chosen — "It has a sweet voice, its cheap and easy to play, and you can carry it as hand luggage" and because the ukulele has no repertory of its own "it allows us to do things that are both entertaining and creative without having to meet the technical requirements of being virtuoso classical players or image-conscious pop musicians"

Hinchliffe informed the Houston Chronicle that the post punk idea was for the orchestra to be an "antidote to pomposity, egomania, cults of personality, rip-offs, music-business-standard-operational nonsense and prima donnas", the orchestra members had previously worked in various music genres but were tired by the conventions, genre stereotyping and pretentiousness within the music industry. UOGB has remained an independent music act which has deliberately not signed to a record label. Hinchliffe stated to the Yorkshire Post the idea of the UOGB was to have bit of fun "where we're not having the agents and the managers and the record companies dictating terms".

== History ==
The UOGB's first gig was at the Roebuck pub, just off Trinity Church Square in London. Although it had been intended to be a one-off, it was a sell out and after just one more performance the orchestra was on national radio. For a while the orchestra had a regular monthly session in the back room at the former Empress of Russia pub in Islington, London. Within three years the orchestra had appeared live on BBC Radio 1 and BBC One Television, released an album and performed at the WOMAD festival.

Hester Goodman, Will Grove-White, Jonty Bankes, Peter Brooke Turner all joined the orchestra during the early 1990s. In 1995 the Ukulele Orchestra of Great Britain performed at the 50th anniversary of the Victory in Europe Day celebrations in London's Hyde Park before an estimated audience of 170,000. Leisa Rea joined in 2003.

For most of its existence the orchestra has been on actively touring the world from places ranging from Spitsbergen, Svalbard in the Arctic Circle to Chongqing Taindi Theatre in China. They have performed at diverse venues and events from local village halls to world famous venues including Ronnie Scott's jazz club, The Royal Festival Hall, the UK Houses of Parliament, Cambridge Folk Festival, Edinburgh Festival, Hay Festival, Glastonbury Festival, New York's Carnegie Hall, and the Sydney Opera House.

In 2005 the orchestra planned to release as a single their popular reinterpretation of Kate Bush's art pop song "Wuthering Heights", reworked as a swinging cocktail-jazz crooning number—complete with a Cab Calloway-style "Heathcliffe!" call and response. They were prevented from doing so, and instead they released a prohibition-era honky-tonk rendition of "Dy-Na-Mi-Tee" (a 2002 hip hop song by Ms. Dynamite). The UOGB cover reached No. 78 in the official UK pop charts.

On Tuesday 18 August 2009 the UOGB performed a concert as part of the BBC Proms 2009 Season at London's Royal Albert Hall, where they were the fastest selling late night prom in history. The concert included a version of Beethoven's Ode to Joy in which at least 1,000 audience members with ukuleles participated. The performance was broadcast live on BBC Radio 3 and received critical acclaim. They returned to the Albert Hall in 2012. Ben Rouse joined the UOGB in 2014. For their 2014 tour of China, the British Council described the UOGB as an orchestra "celebrated for its rapport with audiences, and eliciting a joyous feel-good reaction". In 2016 the UOGB entertained Elizabeth II at Windsor Castle at a private party to celebrate the queen's 90th birthday.

The orchestra has appeared on a wide range of television and radio programs both in the UK and internationally. The UOGB has collaborated with David Bowie, Madness, Robbie Williams, Yusuf Islam (Cat Stevens), the Kaiser Chiefs, the Ministry of Sound, and the film music composer David Arnold. While the orchestra sell its albums directly from their official web site, most of their income is derived from touring with 110 concerts a year according to the New Zealand Stuff news website (while the British Council stated in 2014 that over the previous 29 years the UOGB had performed a higher figure of 9,000 concerts).

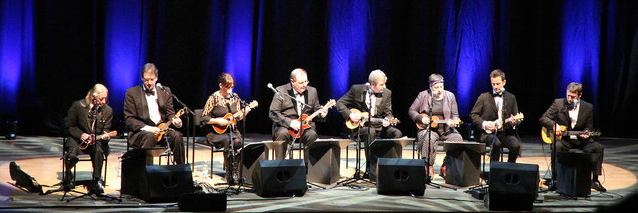
The Ukulele Orchestra of Great Britain performing in 2014, with co-founder Kitty Lux

=== Online performances during COVID-19 ===
During the 2020-21 COVID-19 pandemic, Orchestra's members unable to tour due to the lockdowns and separated in their various homes released 13 music videos as a group on YouTube, called the Ukulele Lockdown series (these were collected together and released as the virtual opening concert for the 2021 San Francisco Performances PIVOT Festival), plus a series ukulele video tutorials and other ukulele videos, followed by five original 'The Ukulele World Service' online pay to view concerts. In 2021, Laura Currie became a full time member of the Ukulele Orchestra of Great Britain. She had previously been a stand-in since 2019 and had toured with the orchestra, she edited the lockdown videos.

== Line-up ==
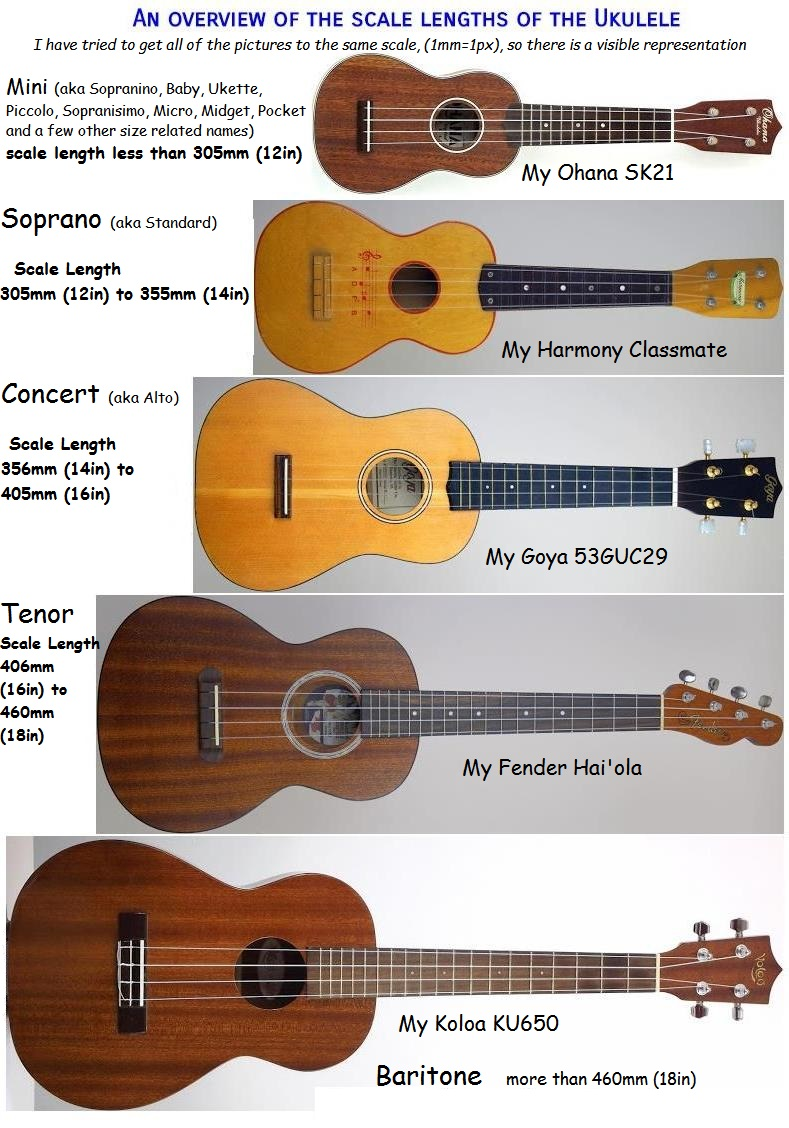
This image shows a range of different ukuleles with different registers, sizes and scale lengths similar to most of the instruments that The Ukulele Orchestra of Great Britain play (The Ukulele Orchestra includes a Bass Ukulele player).

Since 2005 UOGB performed as eight or seven musician vocalists with ukuleles in various registers including: sopranino, soprano, concert, tenor, baritone, and a bass ukulele.

=== Members (as of 2022) ===
Information from the official UOGB website.

- George Hinchliffe (joint founder 1985)(also the UOGB's music director)
- David Suich (Joined 1985).
- Richie Williams (Joined 1985, rejoined 2003)
- Hester Goodman (Joined 1990)
- Will Grove-White (Joined 1991)
- Jonty Bankes (bass ukulele) (Joined 1992)
- Peter Brooke Turner (Joined 1994)
- Leisa Rea (Joined 2003)
- Ben Rouse (Joined 2014)
- Ewan Wardrop
- Laura Currie (Joined 2021)
- Dave Bowie (Joined 1985)

=== Past members ===
- Kitty Lux, band member and co-founder with George Hinchliffe, died on 16 July 2017, aged 59, after suffering from various chronic health issues. Lux recovered from a kidney transplant only days before the Proms concert. She retired from public performances after suffering a stroke in 2015. Some of the UOGB members display a small red and white polka dot bow-tie on their clothing or ukulele, in memory of Lux, who always wore an item of clothing with polka dots while performing.

== Artistic style and repertoire ==
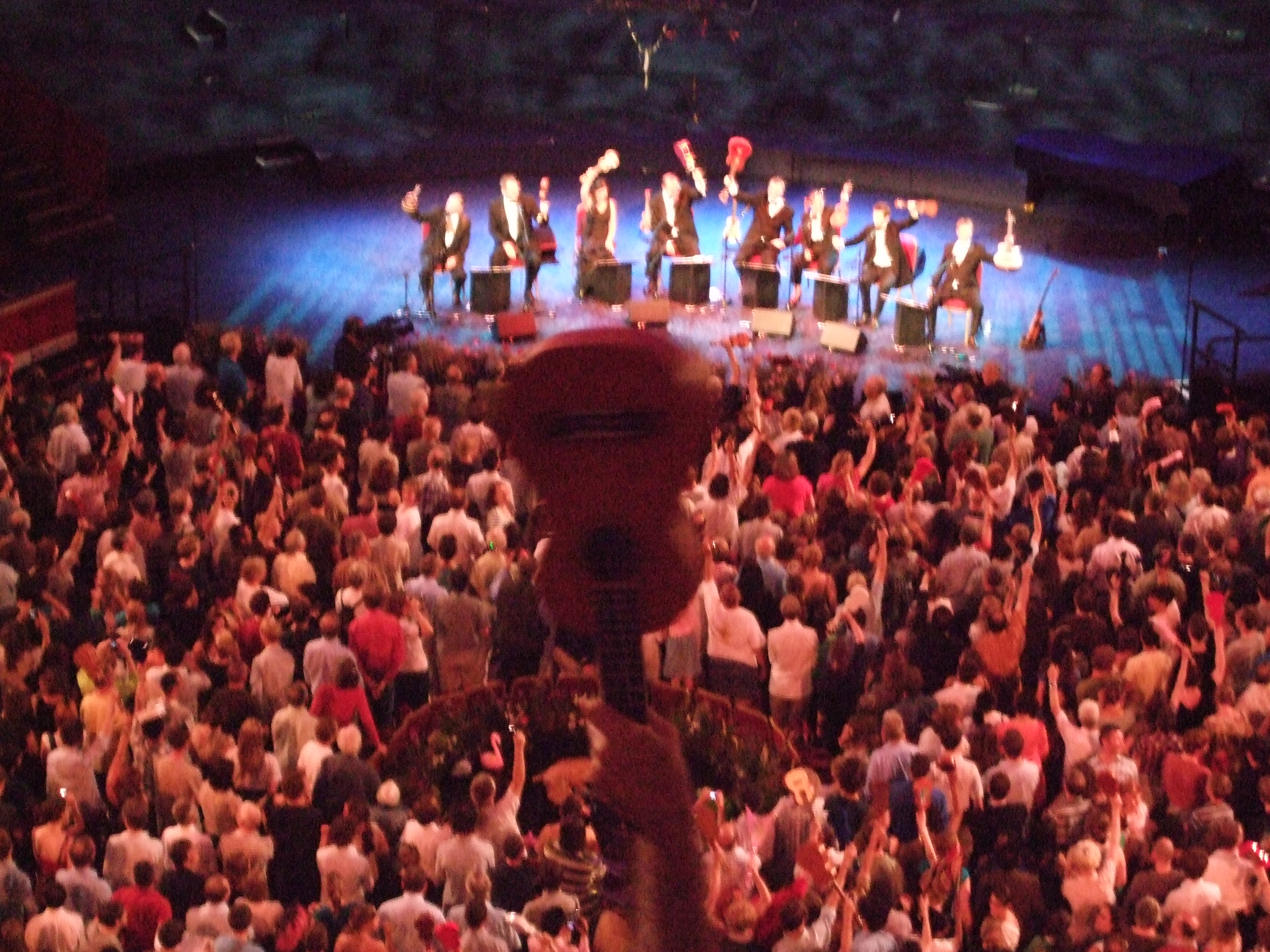
Audience participation during UOGB's performance at the Proms concerts at the Royal Albert Hall on 19 July 2009. Hinchliffe at the time announced from the stage: "a fragment of Beethoven for 1,008 ukuleles".

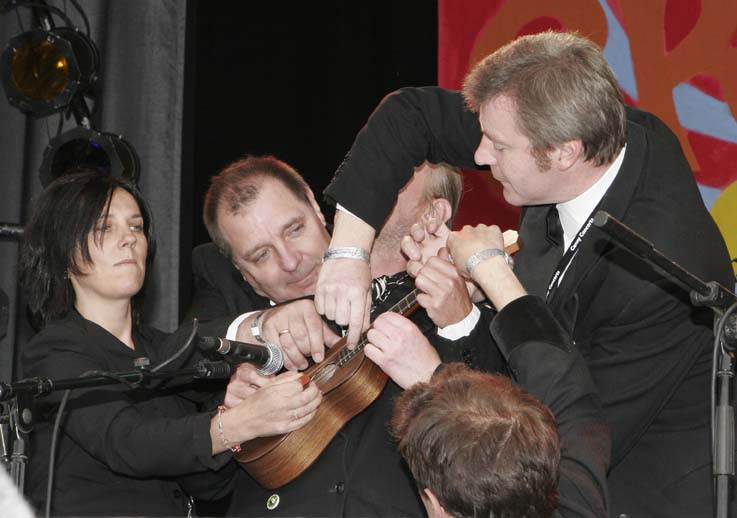
Five Members Of the UOGB playing one Ukulele

A typical UOGB concert according to The New York Times is a "genre bending array" of musical covers that spans from Richard Wagner's The Ride of the Valkyries to the Sex Pistols' "Anarchy in the U.K." The Chicago Tribune reports that the orchestra is "happy to pillage anything from the rich pageant of western music" as it roams freely across the wide range of popular music and art musical genres. The Ukulele orchestra is known for reworking popular song classics, sometimes changing tunes' music genres so that the expectations of the audience are subverted. For instance, the power pop Pinball Wizard turns into a harmonized a cappella with a vaudevillian lead vocal by Hinchliffe, while the Sex Pistol's punk rock call to arms "Anarchy in the UK" is performed in the style of a Simon & Garfunkel cosy campfire sing-along folk song where the audience is encouraged to join in. The group takes George Formby's 1937 song "Leaning on a Lamp-post", but changes it into "Lenin On A Lamppost" performed in a Russian Cossack style.

The Kansas City Star considered the UOGB's medleys as "perhaps their most impressive feats, layering lyrics from disparate sources over a chord progression". Several songs from different genres are combined in one "soup of contrasts" – for example, David Bowie's "Life on Mars?" is melded seamlessly with "My Way", "For Once in My Life", "Born Free", "Substitute", and more. In another piece after a mock argument about what to play next Hinchliffe plays a solo Handel's G minor Suite No. 7 for the Harpsichord, while all the other members sing in turn different songs on top the Handel base "Fly Me To The Moon", "Love Story (Where Do I Begin)", "Autumn Leaves", "Killing Me Softly with His Song", "Hotel California" and "I Will Survive", ending with all genre variations performed simultaneously in harmony together.

All members generate ideas for new pieces and all play around with ways the piece work. The limitations of the ukulele causes the orchestra to think creatively about how to cover a musical piece, popular tunes are broken down to their constituent parts and then with each musician sticking a distinct part, the combination of different soprano, tenor, baritone and bass registers of ukuleles are used (with separate members playing the melody, others the rhythm, others chords on the beat and offbeat etc) to recreate the originals musical textured wall. The Australian stage described the UOGB cover of Wheatus' pop rock "Teenage Dirtbag" as the "same delicacy and finesse as Ludwig's 9th, giving it a whole new complexion" Differentiation during a concert is further created by the fact that each member of the orchestra, each with their own singing style, takes turn to be vocal lead on a cover. The Ukulele Orchestra tries to adapt its programme to match the location of the venue or the occasion, musical numbers with a regional flavour are often included especially when touring overseas, for instance they play Sibelius' Finlandia when they perform in Finland.

=== Visual image and humour ===
The Ukulele Orchestra of Great Britain perform their gigs in a light-heartedly parody of a 'very prim and proper, staid sort-of orchestra', wearing traditional orchestra dress for performances, with the men in black tie (black suits and bow ties) and the women in smart evening wear, seated behind music stands. The humorous side of the UOGB came by accident during their first live session, when joking began after they unintentionally played in two keys at the same time. The comedy element is of the old fashioned British dry and self-deprecating kind, supported by orchestra's musical close chemistry and their adept timing. The New York Times noted that the orchestra often light-heartedly mock the "ludicrousness and pretentiousness" of famous tunes with deadpan humour and pun-filled banter with numbers introduced with a light hearted humour. The Guardian and Gigwise noted that the orchestra's deadpan delivery had the ability to dismantle the pretensions that might be connected to a musical piece. Alternatively physical comedy is incorporated with the musicianship, for instance when up to five members bunch together to play a single small ukulele.

== Critical reception ==
The Ukulele Orchestra of Great Britain has been described by the Daily Telegraph, The Guardian and others as a "much-loved" British institution" that has become a "worldwide phenomenon" with an "international cult status". The orchestra has received positive reviews of its concerts from critics. Manchester Evening News said of the orchestra that it had "a beautiful chemistry that represents fun, innocence, daftness and a genuinely enjoyable showcase of unique talent". The Kansas City Star considered the orchestra had "taken the comic aspects and musical capabilities of the ukulele and blended them together into a well-honed act, delivered with marvellous nonchalance and impressive versatility". In the Financial Times, Laura Battle applauded the orchestra members’ "consummate skill" and said that the "sophisticated sound they make both percussive and melodic is at once hilarious and heartfelt".

BBC Radio 4 and the Canadian Now described the Ukulele Orchestra as a union of skilful musicianship with a subversive post punk delivery and The Press (York) added that they used the limitations of the ukulele "to create a musical freedom that reveals unsuspected musical insights". Classic FM described the UOGB's rendition of Ennio Morricone's "The Good, The Bad And The Ugly" as both "sprightly" and a "delightfully delicate" that remained true to the epic composition of the original work, while the Australian Stage.com called the UOGB's cover "jaw-dropping".

== Legacy ==
Several sources have mentioned that the orchestra is "often blamed for the current ukulele revival which is sweeping the globe", with other ukulele orchestras and groups, following UOGB's lead, have "spawned" over the years in most major cities around the world. The UOGB began the approach of orchestrating songs so that each ukulele played a separate part ~ “since then we’ve seen the concept of ensemble ukulele playing flourish right across the world.” Asked by the Sydney Morning Herald to explain the success of his orchestra, Hinchliffe replied "the world has gone ukulele mad". The question Why is everyone suddenly playing the ukulele? is asked by a Daily Telegraph article, research by ABRSM (Associated Board of the Royal Schools of Music), the exam board of the Royal Schools of Music, has found that the ukulele is replacing the recorder as the instrument of choice for school ensemble music lessons. There are a multiple reasons for this, the ukulele has become a popular instrument to take up, with the Classical Music website of the BBC Music Magazine stating thas the UOGB "has played a major part in popularising the ukulele, with sales at music stores booming and the instrument becoming a mainstay of schools’ music curriculum". The UOGB itself has donated large batches of ukuleles to schools over the years. The orchestra also often run Ukulele workshops for fellow ukulele players and school children in the afternoons before gigs, including with thousands of young players in a stadium in New Zealand. Prior to gigs the orchestra also gives out advance notice of an audience participation tune so that those that wish to participate can bring along their own ukulele and play along with the orchestra.

== Original works ==
In 2008, the group performed Dreamspiel, a ukulele opera, composed by George Hinchliffe and Michelle Carter for the Grimeborn Festival at London's Arcola Theatre. They have also, in 2010 and 2011, performed Ukulelescope where they played music to accompany silent movies from the British Film Institute archives. In 2012, Waly Waly on the Ukulele reworked arrangements of Cecil Sharp's collected folk tunes for performances at the Birmingham Town Hall and Cecil Sharp House in London. (Recordings from these shows were released in 2016 as the CD The Keeper.) In 2014, to commemorate the one hundredth anniversary of the start of World War I, the orchestra presented When This Lousy War is Over which reflected a range of attitudes from the time; patriotic, pacifist and feminist, and drew from gypsy music, music hall, soldiers' songs and even a song from the then radical avant-garde Cabaret Voltaire in neutral Switzerland.

== Legal dispute ==
In 2009, Erwin Clausen, a German producer, approached the UOGB with a request to set up a franchise version of the band in Germany. The UOGB denied his request, however Clausen assembled the United Kingdom Ukulele Orchestra (UKUO), which performed in a very similar style as that UOGB. Based in Germany, the UKUO just like the UOGB consisted of eight British musicians (six men and two women) who wore semi-formal evening dress sitting in a line behind music stands performing a similar range of cover versions of popular music and similar comedy. Judge Richard Hacon, sitting at the Intellectual Property Enterprise Court initially declined to issue an injunction to stop UKUO touring England in 2014 as proceedings had been issued too late. Ultimately, the court found that the German-based ukulele troop was causing confusion and so the claim of passing off succeeded. The Judge ruled Clausen had "acted outside honest practices" when he set up the UKUO, and evidence showed that confusion between the two orchestras' names did confuse the public "who recognise The Ukulele Orchestra of Great Britain as the trade name of a particular musical act, [and] that the two orchestras UOGB and UKUO are either the same group, or otherwise commercially connected". The court found that this had caused damage to the Ukulele Orchestra of Great Britain's goodwill, especially by way of the UOGB's loss of control over their reputation as artists. However, though similarities in the name amounted to passing off, the judge ruled that Clausen and the UKUO were not guilty of copyright or trademark infringement as far as the style of the performance was concerned.

== Discography ==
=== Single ===
- Miss Dy-na-mi-tee – 2005, Longman Records (CD)

=== Studio albums ===
- The Ukulele Variations – 1988, Disque Ethnique (LP); CBS/Sony Records (CD)
- Hearts of Oak – 1990, CBS/Sony Records (CD)
- A Fist Full of Ukuleles – 1994, Sony Records (CD)
- Pluck – 1998, Tachyon Records (CD)
- Songs for Plucking Lovers – 2000, UOGB(CD)
- Anarchy in the Ukulele – 2000, UOGB(CD)
- Eine Kleine Ukemusik – 2000, UOGB(CD)
- The Secret of Life – 2004, Longman Records (CD)
- Miss Dy-na-mi-tee – 2005, Longman Records (CD single)
- Precious Little – 2007, UOGB (CD)
- Christmas with the Ukulele Orchestra of Great Britain – 2008, UOGB (CD)
- (Ever Such) Pretty Girls – 2015, UOGB (CD)
- Lousy War 2016, UOGB (CD)
- The Originals 2016, UOGB (CD)
- By Request (Songs From The Set List) 2018, UOGB (CD)
- The Only Album by the Ukulele Orchestra You Will Ever Need Volume Three – 2019, UOGB (CD)
- The Only Album By The Ukulele Orchestra You Will Ever Need, Vol. 9 – 2020, UOGB (CD)
- Never Mind The Reindeer – 2020, UOGB (CD)
- One Plucking Thing After Another – 2021, UOGB (CD)

=== Live albums ===
- Anarchy in the Ukulele – 2005 (CD)
- Live in London #1 – 2008, UOGB (CD)
- Live in London #2 – 2009, UOGB (CD)
- Still Live – 2011, UOGB (CD)
- Uke-Werk – 2013, UOGB (CD)
- The Keeper – 2016, UOGB (CD)

=== Compilations ===
- Top Notch – 2001, UOGB (CD)
- Bang Bang(My Baby Shot Me Down) EP – The Ukulele Orchestra Vs Ibiza Air – 2013, UOGB (CD)

=== DVDs ===
- Anarchy in the Ukulele – 2005, UOGB (DVD)
- Prom Night – Live at the Royal Albert Hall – BBC Proms 2009 – 2009, UOGB (DVD)
- The Ukes Down Under – 2012, Litmus Films (DVD)
- The Ukes in America – 2013, Litmus Films (DVD)
