= 2022 in British music =

This is a summary of the year 2022 in British music.

== Events ==
- 19 January – English Touring Opera announces that James Conway is to stand down as its artistic director at the close of 2022, and to serve in a part-time capacity in the post for the remainder of the calendar year.
- 8 February
  - The BBC Scottish Symphony Orchestra announces the appointment of Ryan Wigglesworth as its next chief conductor, effective September 2022.
  - The 2022 Brit Awards are the first to be held without gender-related categories.
  - Adele makes a rare live appearance at the 2022 Brit Awards.
- 9 February – The Barbican Centre announces the appointment of Claire Spencer as its first-ever chief executive officer, effective May 2022.
- 29 March – Concert for Ukraine, a two-hour fundraising event organised by ITV, Livewire Pictures, Global Radio and the Disasters Emergency Committee, takes place in Birmingham.
- 25 April – The Philharmonia Orchestra announces the appointment of Thorben Dittes as its next chief executive, effective 1 August 2022.
- 14 May – At the Eurovision Song Contest in Turin, Sam Ryder comes 2nd with his song "Space Man"
- 19 May – The Academy of St Martin in the Fields announces the appointment of Annie Lydford as its next chief executive, effective September 2022.
- 21 May – The first night of the new Glyndebourne Festival Opera production of The Wreckers takes place, the first opera by a female composer to be staged at Glyndebourne, and the first professional staging of the opera with its original French libretto.
- 23 May
  - The BBC announces its new roster of New Generation Artists for the period 2022–2024:
    - Santiago Cañón-Valencia (cellist)
    - Ryan Corbett (accordionist)
    - Hugh Cutting (countertenor)
    - Leonkoro Quartet
    - Geneva Lewis (violinist)
    - Fergus McCreadie (jazz pianist)
    - Masabane Cecilia Rangwanasha (soprano)
  - The English Symphony Orchestra announces the appointment of Seb Lovell-Huckle as its next chief executive officer, effective 8 August 2022.
- 31 May – The Association of British Orchestra announces that Mark Pemberton is to stand down as its chief executive at the end of September 2022.
- 1 June: Queen's Birthday Honours (Platinum Jubilee)
  - Stephen Hough is made a Knight Bachelor.
  - Chi-chi Nwanoku is made a Commander of the Order of the British Empire.
  - Harry Bicket, Justin Hayward, and David Jackson are each made an Officer of the Order of the British Empire.
  - Hugh Atkins (Tim Blacksmith), Sandra Colston, Julia Desbrulais, Beverley Humphreys, Elizabeth Llewellyn, Elaine Mitchener, and Bonnie Tyler are each made a Member of the Order of the British Empire.
- 21 June – The Orlando Consort announces that it is to disband in June 2023.
- 24 June – Billie Eilish headlines the Pyramid stage at the 2022 Glastonbury Festival, the youngest headliner in Glastonbury's history.
- 25 June – Sir Paul McCartney headlines the Pyramid stage at the 2022 Glastonbury Festival, the oldest headliner in Glastonbury's history.
- 5 July
  - Westminster Abbey announces the appointment of Andrew Nethsingha as its next organist and master of choristers, effective in 2023.
  - St. John's College, Cambridge announces that Andrew Nethsingha is to stand down as its director of music at the close of 2022.
- 27 July – Belfast Cathedral announces the disbandement of its cathedral choir and the elimination of the post of Director of Music, effective 1 September 2022.
- 9 August – The Royal Albert Hall announces that Craig Hassall is to stand down as its chief executive officer in early 2023.
- 7 September – Southbank Sinfonia at St John's Smith Square announces the departure today of Richard Heaton as its co-director.
- 8 September
  - Opera North announces that Richard Mantle is to stand down as its general director at the end of 2023.
  - Following the death of HRH Queen Elizabeth II, the BBC Proms cancels the remaining three Proms of the 2022 season, including The Last Night, the first cancellation of The Last Night since 1944.
- 12 September – The BBC announces that Alan Davey is to stand down as controller of BBC Radio 3 in March 2023.
- 20 September – The Ulster Orchestra announces simultaneously the appointment of Auveen Sands as its next chief executive, the first woman named to the post, effective at the end of October 2022, and the elevation of Daniele Rustioni's title with the orchestra to music director with immediate effect.
- 9 October – Percussionist Jordan Ashman is named the 2022 BBC Young Musician of the Year.
- 18 October – Little Simz wins the 2022 Mercury Prize for her album Sometimes I Might Be Introvert. The ceremony had previously been scheduled for 8 September but was suspended following the death of Queen Elizabeth.
- 22 December – Lambeth Council suspends the Brixton O2 Academy's licence following the deaths of two concertgoers during a crowd crush at the venue.
- 24 December – Sugababes surprise release The Lost Tapes, an album consisting of previously unreleased material recorded by original line-up Mutya Buena, Keisha Buchanan and Siobhán Donaghy during their re-formation as Mutya Keisha Siobhán. It became the group's first release in twelve years and the first album to feature the original line-up since their debut One Touch in 2000.

== Bands formed ==
- CuteBad
- Say Now

== Bands disbanded ==
- Genesis
- Lighthouse Family
- Supergrass

== Bands reformed ==
- The Damned (original line-up)
- The Delgados
- Everything but the Girl
- Hard-Fi
- Inspiral Carpets
- Pink Floyd – a one off recording, "Hey, Hey, Rise Up!", in aid of Ukrainian Humanitarian relief, following the Russian invasion of Ukraine
- Pulp
- Roxy Music
- Symposium

== Classical works ==
- Joseph Davies – Parallax (for violin and orchestra)
- Simon Holt – The Sower
- Helen Grime – Trumpet Concerto: night-sky-blue
- Richard Baker – The Price of Curiosity
- Alex Mills – Landsker
- Graham Fitkin – Bla, Bla, Bla
- Gavin Higgins (music) and Francesca Simon (text) – The Faerie Bride
- Charlotte Bray
  - Forsaken
  - 'The Earth Cried Out to the Sky' (settings of English translations of texts by Borys Humenyuk and Ostap Slyvynsky)
- Conor Mitchell – Look Both Ways (text excerpts by Peter Pears and Benjamin Britten)
- Claire Victoria Roberts – Like Ships Adrift
- Sally Beamish – Hive (concerto for harp and orchestra)
- Julian Anderson – Symphony No. 2 (Prague Panoramas)
- Gavin Higgins – Concerto Grosso for Brass Band and Orchestra
- Matthew Kaner (music) and Simon Armitage (text) – Pearl
- Errolyn Wallen – LADY SUPER SPY ADVENTURER
- Public Service Broadcasting – This New Noise
- Judith Weir – 'Like as the hart'
- Sir James MacMillan – 'Who shall separate us from the love of Christ?'

=== New operas ===
- Tom Coult and Alice Birch – Violet
- Will Todd (composer), David Pountney, Sarah Woods, Edson Burton, Miles Chambers, Eric Ngalle Charles, Shreya Sen-Handley (librettists) – Migrations
- Laura Bowler and Laura Lomas – The Blue Woman

== British music awards ==
- 6 January – PinkPantheress is announced as the BBC Sound of 2022.
- 8 February – Brit Awards – see 2022 Brit Awards

== Charts and sales ==
=== Number-one singles ===
The singles chart includes a proportion for streaming.

Key
†	Best performing single of the year

Chart date (week ending)	Song	Artist(s)	Chart sales	References
6 January	"Merry Christmas"	Ed Sheeran and Elton John	82,780	
13 January	"Easy on Me"	Adele	39,156	
20 January	"ABCDEFU"	Gayle	41,079	
27 January	"We Don't Talk About Bruno"	Carolina Gaitán, Mauro Castillo, Adassa, Rhenzy Feliz, Diane Guerrero and Stephanie Beatriz	45,684	
3 February	"We Don't Talk About Bruno"	Carolina Gaitán, Mauro Castillo, Adassa, Rhenzy Feliz, Diane Guerrero and Stephanie Beatriz	55,709	
10 February	"We Don't Talk About Bruno"	Carolina Gaitán, Mauro Castillo, Adassa, Rhenzy Feliz, Diane Guerrero and Stephanie Beatriz	59,169	
17 February	"We Don't Talk About Bruno"	Carolina Gaitán, Mauro Castillo, Adassa, Rhenzy Feliz, Diane Guerrero and Stephanie Beatriz	59,904	
24 February	"We Don't Talk About Bruno"	Carolina Gaitán, Mauro Castillo, Adassa, Rhenzy Feliz, Diane Guerrero and Stephanie Beatriz	59,175	
3 March	"We Don't Talk About Bruno"	Carolina Gaitán, Mauro Castillo, Adassa, Rhenzy Feliz, Diane Guerrero and Stephanie Beatriz	53,355	
10 March	"We Don't Talk About Bruno"	Carolina Gaitán, Mauro Castillo, Adassa, Rhenzy Feliz, Diane Guerrero and Stephanie Beatriz	46,262	
17 March	"Starlight"	Dave	62,805	
24 March	"Starlight"	Dave	64,073	
31 March	"Starlight"	Dave	58,642	
7 April	"Starlight"	Dave	52,718	
14 April	"As It Was"†	Harry Styles	94,140	
21 April	"As It Was"†	Harry Styles	70,389	
28 April	"As It Was"†	Harry Styles	65,387	
5 May	"As It Was"†	Harry Styles	63,873	
12 May	"As It Was"†	Harry Styles	61,277	
19 May	"As It Was"†	Harry Styles	59,281	
26 May	"As It Was"†	Harry Styles	65,568	
2 June	"As It Was"†	Harry Styles	80,725	
9 June	"As It Was"†	Harry Styles	65,974	
16 June	"As It Was"†	Harry Styles	55,768	
23 June	"Running Up That Hill"	Kate Bush	77,903	
30 June	"Running Up That Hill"	Kate Bush	78,568	
7 July	"Running Up That Hill"	Kate Bush	65,013	
14 July	"Afraid to Feel"	LF System	52,402	
21 July	"Afraid to Feel"	LF System	61,357	
28 July	"Afraid to Feel"	LF System	61,443	
4 August	"Afraid to Feel"	LF System	48,932	
11 August	"Afraid to Feel"	LF System	46,625	
18 August	"Afraid to Feel"	LF System	49,320	
25 August	"Afraid to Feel"	LF System	47,117	
1 September	"Afraid to Feel"	LF System	41,283	
8 September	"B.O.T.A. (Baddest of Them All)"	Eliza Rose and Interplanetary Criminal	43,576	
15 September	"B.O.T.A. (Baddest of Them All)"	Eliza Rose and Interplanetary Criminal	46,725	
22 September	"Forget Me"	Lewis Capaldi	56,882	
29 September	"I'm Good (Blue)"	David Guetta and Bebe Rexha	50,988	
6 October	"Unholy"	Sam Smith and Kim Petras	55,928	
13 October	"Unholy"	Sam Smith and Kim Petras	58,358	
20 October	"Unholy"	Sam Smith and Kim Petras	57,290	
27 October	"Unholy"	Sam Smith and Kim Petras	59,493	
3 November	"Anti-Hero"	Taylor Swift	78,993	
10 November	"Anti-Hero"	Taylor Swift	64,914	
17 November	"Anti-Hero"	Taylor Swift	57,525	
24 November	"Anti-Hero"	Taylor Swift	51,851	
1 December	"Anti-Hero"	Taylor Swift	47,851	
8 December	"Anti-Hero"	Taylor Swift	44,473	
15 December	"All I Want for Christmas Is You"	Mariah Carey	44,797	
22 December	"Last Christmas"	Wham!	48,535	
29 December	"Food Aid"	LadBaby	65,335	

=== Number-one albums ===
The albums chart includes a proportion for streaming.

Key
†	Best performing album of the year

Chart date (week ending)	Album	Artist(s)	Chart sales	References
6 January	=	Ed Sheeran		
13 January	=	Ed Sheeran	17,499	
20 January	Dawn FM	The Weeknd	20,726	
27 January	Fix Yourself, Not the World	The Wombats	13,812	
3 February	Night Call	Years & Years	20,398	
10 February	Amazing Things	Don Broco	14,959	
17 February	Give Me the Future	Bastille	19,906	
24 February	FTHC	Frank Turner	20,290	
3 March	=	Ed Sheeran	9,831	
10 March	23	Central Cee	29,764	
17 March	Oochya!	Stereophonics	24,067	
24 March	Who Cares?	Rex Orange County	18,089	
31 March	Crash	Charli XCX	16,117	
7 April	Higher	Michael Bublé	21,170	
14 April	Unlimited Love	Red Hot Chili Peppers	27,426	
21 April	Wet Leg	Wet Leg	28,972	
28 April	Noughty by Nature	Digga D	8,855	
5 May	Skinty Fia	Fontaines D.C.	19,983	
12 May	Ribbon Around the Bomb	Blossoms	14,362	
19 May	WE	Arcade Fire	18,821	
26 May	Dance Fever	Florence and the Machine	31,187	
2 June	Harry's House†	Harry Styles	113,812	
9 June	C'mon You Know	Liam Gallagher	70,261	
16 June	Harry's House†	Harry Styles	23,458	
23 June	Gold Rush Kid	George Ezra	44,514	
30 June	Harry's House†	Harry Styles	27,468	
7 July	Harry's House†	Harry Styles	19,507	
14 July	Last Night in the Bittersweet	Paolo Nutini	34,436	
21 July	Harry's House†	Harry Styles	12,804	
28 July	Harry's House†	Harry Styles	11,742	
4 August	The Theory of Whatever	Jamie T	20,311	
11 August	Renaissance	Beyoncé	31,064	
18 August	Renaissance	Beyoncé	11,621	
25 August	The Alchemist's Euphoria	Kasabian	21,548	
1 September	Platinum Collection	Steps	24,123	
8 September	Will of the People	Muse	51,510	
15 September	Yungblud	Yungblud	22,825	
22 September	XXV	Robbie Williams	37,925	
29 September	Born Pink	Blackpink	20,957	
6 October	5SOS5	5 Seconds of Summer	14,853	
13 October	The End, So Far	Slipknot	14,068	
20 October	N.K-Pop	Paul Heaton and Jacqui Abbott	19,597	
27 October	Being Funny in a Foreign Language	The 1975	40,962	
3 November	Midnights	Taylor Swift	204,501	
10 November	Midnights	Taylor Swift	48,113	
17 November	Her Loss	Drake and 21 Savage	36,194	
24 November	Faith in the Future	Louis Tomlinson	35,239	
1 December	Sonder	Dermot Kennedy	25,748	
8 December	This Is What I Mean	Stormzy	27,875	
15 December	Marry Me	Olly Murs	20,156	
22 December	There's Nothing but Space, Man!	Sam Ryder	24,847	
29 December	Midnights	Taylor Swift	17,109	

=== Number-one compilation albums ===
The compilation chart includes a proportion for streaming.

Chart date (week ending)	Album	Chart sales	References
6 January	Now 110	4,681	
13 January	Encanto	6,684	
20 January	Encanto	9,205	
27 January	Encanto	11,395	
3 February	Encanto	13,855	
10 February	Encanto	14,761	
17 February	Encanto	15,315	
24 February	Encanto	15,591	
3 March	Encanto	15,123	
10 March	Encanto	12,991	
17 March	Encanto	11,112	
24 March	Encanto	10,046	
31 March	Encanto	8,747	
7 April	Encanto	7,944	
14 April	Encanto		
21 April	Now 111	14,197	
28 April	Now 111	5,517	
5 May	Now 111	4,642	
12 May	Encanto	4,255	
19 May	Encanto	3,524	
26 May	Eurovision Song Contest 2022	10,351	
2 June	Now Yearbook 1981	7,205	
9 June	Now Timeless... The Songs	5,610	
16 June	Top Gun: Maverick	2,664	
23 June	Top Gun: Maverick		
30 June	Now Pride	2,733	
7 July	Now 60s & 70s Summer: Seasons In The Sun	4,491	
14 July	Now Yearbook Extra 1981	2,536	
21 July	The Greatest Showman	2,110	
28 July	Now Yearbook 1980	7,213	
4 August	The Greatest Showman		
11 August	Now 112	14,308	
18 August	Now 112	6,201	
25 August	Now 112	4,193	
1 September	Now 112	3,223	
8 September	Now 112	2,810	
15 September	Now 12" 70s	3,665	
22 September	Now Yearbook 1979	6,707	
29 September	The Greatest Showman	1,922	
6 October	The Greatest Showman	2,049	
13 October	The Greatest Showman	2,158	
20 October	The Greatest Showman	2,218	
27 October	Now 90s Dancefloor	3,460	
3 November	Now Yearbook Extra 1979	3,077	
10 November	The Greatest Showman	2,219	
17 November	Now Yearbook 1985	7,481	
24 November	Now Christmas	3,944	
1 December	Now 113	14,420	
8 December	Now 113	8,458	
15 December	Now 113	8,016	
22 December	Now 113	7,312	
29 December	Now 113	7,876	

== Year-end charts ==
=== Top singles of the year ===
This chart was published by the Official Charts Company on January 4, 2023

No.	Title	Artist(s)	Peak position	Combined
1	"As It Was"	Harry Styles	1	1,570,000
2	"Bad Habits"	Ed Sheeran	11 (Note: Reached number 1 in 2021)	1,180,000
3	"Peru"	Fireboy DML and Ed Sheeran	2	
4	"Go"	Cat Burns	2	
5	"Shivers"	Ed Sheeran	10 (Note: Reached number 1 in 2021)	
6	"Running Up That Hill"	Kate Bush	1	
7	"Heat Waves"	Glass Animals	20 (Note: Reached number 5 in 2021)	
8	"Where Are You Now"	Lost Frequencies and Calum Scott	3	
9	"Afraid to Feel"	LF System	1	
10	"Seventeen Going Under"	Sam Fender	3	
11	"We Don't Talk About Bruno"	Carolina Gaitán, Mauro Castillo, Adassa, Rhenzy Feliz, Diane Guerrero and Stephanie Beatriz	1	
12	"Make Me Feel Good"	Belters Only featuring Jazzy	4	
13	"Cold Heart (Pnau remix)"	Elton John and Dua Lipa	13 (Note: Reached number 1 in 2021)	
14	"Starlight"	Dave	1	
15	"Green Green Grass"	George Ezra	3	
16	"Where Did You Go?"	Jax Jones featuring MNEK	7	
17	"ABCDEFU"	Gayle	1	
18	"Baby"	Aitch and Ashanti	2	
19	"About Damn Time"	Lizzo	3	
20	"I Ain't Worried"	OneRepublic	3	
21	"Crazy What Love Can Do"	David Guetta, Becky Hill and Ella Henderson	5	
22	"Easy on Me"	Adele	1	
23	"Down Under"	Luude featuring Colin Hay	5	
24	"B.O.T.A. (Baddest of Them All)"	Eliza Rose and Interplanetary Criminal	1	
25	"I'm Good (Blue)"	David Guetta and Bebe Rexha	1	
26	"Last Last"	Burna Boy	4	
27	"Another Love"	Tom Odell	12 (Note: Reached number 10 in 2013)	
28	"First Class"	Jack Harlow	2	
29	"Mr. Brightside"	The Killers	51 (Note: Reached number 10 in 2004)	
30	"Stay"	The Kid Laroi and Justin Bieber	27 (Note: Reached number 2 in 2021)	
31	"Unholy"	Sam Smith and Kim Petras	1	
32	"Late Night Talking"	Harry Styles	2	
33	"Overseas"	D-Block Europe featuring Central Cee	6	
34	"Bam Bam"	Camila Cabello featuring Ed Sheeran	7	
35	"Last Christmas"	Wham!	1	
36	"All I Want for Christmas Is You"	Mariah Carey	1	
37	"Save Your Tears"	The Weeknd	57 (Note: Reached number 2 in 2021)	
38	"Break My Soul"	Beyoncé	2	
39	"Surface Pressure"	Jessica Darrow	3	
40	"Forget Me"	Lewis Capaldi	1	
41	"Good 4 U"	Olivia Rodrigo	34 (Note: Reached number 1 in 2021)	
42	"House on Fire"	Mimi Webb	6	
43	"BMW"	Bad Boy Chiller Crew	7	
44	"Blinding Lights"	The Weeknd	39 (Note: Reached number 1 in 2020)	
45	"Under the Influence"	Chris Brown	7	
46	"IFTK"	Tion Wayne and La Roux	6	
47	"She's All I Wanna Be"	Tate McRae	14	
48	"Wait for U"	Future featuring Drake and Tems	8	
49	"2step"	Ed Sheeran	9	
50	"Perfect"	Ed Sheeran	(Note: Reached number 1 in 2017)	
51	"Overpass Graffiti"	Ed Sheeran	11 (Note: Reached number 4 in 2021)	
52	"Remember"	Becky Hill and David Guetta	31 (Note: Reached number 3 in 2021)	
53	"Someone You Loved"	Lewis Capaldi	72 (Note: Reached number 1 in 2019)	
54	"Anyone for You (Tiger Lily)"	George Ezra	12	
55	"21 Reasons"	Nathan Dawe featuring Ella Henderson	9	
56	"Levitating"	Dua Lipa	52 (Note: Reached number 5 in 2020)	
57	"The Motto"	Tiësto and Ava Max	12	
58	"Bad Habit"	Steve Lacy	8	
59	"Anti-Hero"	Taylor Swift	1	
60	"Enemy"	Imagine Dragons and JID	17	
61	"Fingers Crossed"	Lauren Spencer-Smith	4	
62	"Ghost"	Justin Bieber	19	
63	"Ferrari"	James Hype and Miggy Dela Rosa	6	
64	"505"	Arctic Monkeys	73	
65	"Big City Life"	Luude and Mattafix	8	
66	"Space Man"	Sam Ryder	2	
67	"Shape of You"	Ed Sheeran	(Note: Reached number 1 in 2017)	
68	"Happier Than Ever"	Billie Eilish	31 (Note: Reached number 4 in 2021)	
69	"Riptide"	Vance Joy	99 (Note: Reached number 10 in 2014)	
70	"Coming for You"	SwitchOTR featuring A1 x J1	5	
71	"Watermelon Sugar"	Harry Styles	78 (Note: Reached number 4 in 2020)	
72	"Doja"	Central Cee	2	
73	"Iris"	Goo Goo Dolls	79 (Note: Reached number 3 in 2011)	
74	"Dreams"	Fleetwood Mac	94 (Note: Reached number 24 in 1977)	
75	"Rockin' Around the Christmas Tree"	Brenda Lee	4	
76	"No Excuses"	Bru-C	14	
77	"The Family Madrigal"	Stephanie Beatriz and Olga Merediz	7	
78	"Love Nwantiti"	CKay	33 (Note: Reached number 3 in 2021)	
79	"Music for a Sushi Restaurant"	Harry Styles	3	
80	"Wonderwall"	Oasis	99 (Note: Reached number 2 in 1995)	
81	"Sweater Weather"	The Neighbourhood	74 (Note: Reached number 49 in 2014)	

=== Best-selling albums ===
This chart was published by the Official Charts Company on January 4, 2023

No.	Title	Artist	Peak position	Combined
1	Harry's House	Harry Styles	1	460,000
2	=	Ed Sheeran	1	433,000
3	Midnights	Taylor Swift	1	417,000
4	The Highlights	The Weeknd	2	
5	Sour	Olivia Rodrigo	1	
6	Curtain Call: The Hits	Eminem	1	
7	Diamonds	Elton John	5	
8	50 Years – Don't Stop	Fleetwood Mac	5	
9	Between Us	Little Mix	3	
10	ABBA Gold	ABBA	1	
11	Greatest Hits	Queen	1	
12	÷	Ed Sheeran	1	
13	AM	Arctic Monkeys	1	
14	30	Adele	1	
15	Time Flies... 1994–2009	Oasis	1	
16	Fine Line	Harry Styles	2	
17	The Car	Arctic Monkeys	2	
18	Gold Rush Kid	George Ezra	1	
19	Divinely Uninspired to a Hellish Extent	Lewis Capaldi	1	
20	Rumours	Fleetwood Mac	1	
21	Seventeen Going Under	Sam Fender	1	
22	Dawn FM	The Weeknd	1	
23	Number Ones	Michael Jackson	1	
24	Planet Her	Doja Cat	3	
25	We're All Alone in This Together	Dave	1	
26	Legend	Bob Marley and the Wailers	1	
27	Only Honest on the Weekend	Becky Hill	7	
28	ELV1S: 30 No. 1 Hits	Elvis Presley	1	
29	(What's the Story) Morning Glory?	Oasis	1	
30	Folklore	Taylor Swift	1	
31	1	The Beatles	1	
32	Future Nostalgia	Dua Lipa	1	
33	1989	Taylor Swift	1	
34	Certified Lover Boy	Drake	1	
35	Renaissance	Beyoncé	1	
36	Mr. Morale & the Big Steppers	Kendrick Lamar	2	
37	Whatever People Say I Am, That's What I'm Not	Arctic Monkeys	1	
38	Happier Than Ever	Billie Eilish	1	
39	Legacy (The Very Best of David Bowie)	David Bowie	5	
40	Home Alone 2	D-Block Europe	6	
41	I Will Always Love You: The Best of Whitney Houston	Whitney Houston	13	
42	Singles	Maroon 5	32	
43	Lover	Taylor Swift	1	
44	Pier Pressure	ArrDee	2	
45	C'mon You Know	Liam Gallagher	1	
46	Shoot for the Stars, Aim for the Moon	Pop Smoke	1	
47	Dua Lipa	Dua Lipa	3	
48	Twenty Five	George Michael	1	
49	23	Central Cee	1	
50	Wet Leg	Wet Leg	1	
51	Best of 50 Cent	50 Cent	41	
52	Red (Taylor's Version)	Taylor Swift	1	
53	25	Adele	1	
54	Doo-Wops & Hooligans	Bruno Mars	1	
55	In the Lonely Hour	Sam Smith	1	
56	Psychodrama	Dave	1	

== Deaths ==
- 10 January – Francis Jackson, organist and composer, 104
- 17 January – Jennifer Toye, operatic soprano, 88
- 18 January – Roger Tapping, classical violist resident in the US and past violist of the Takács Quartet, 61
- 19 January – Nigel Rogers, classical tenor and early music specialist, 86
- 30 January – Norma Waterson, English folk singer, songwriter (The Watersons), 82, pneumonia.
- 9 February
  - Joseph Horovitz, Austrian-born classical composer, 95
  - Ian McDonald, English multi-instrumental musician, (King Crimson), (Foreigner), 75, cancer.
- 19 February – Gary Brooker, singer, songwriter, musician, (Procol Harum), 76 (cancer)
- 20 February – Jamal Edwards, DJ, entrepreneur, 31 (heart attack)
- 25 February – MC Skibadee, musician, drum and bass MC, 54
- 26 February – Nicky Tesco, singer, (The Members), 66
- 13 March – Mary Lee, singer, 100
- 24 March – John McLeod, classical composer, 88
- 25 March – Philip Jeck, experimental composer, 69
- 26 March – Tina May, singer, 60
- 30 March – Tom Parker, singer, (The Wanted), 33, brain tumour.
- 7 April – Christopher Ball, classical composer, 85
- 18 April – Harrison Birtwistle, classical composer, 87
- 1 May – Ric Parnell, drummer (Atomic Rooster), (Spinal Tap), 70.
- 11 May – William Bennett, classical flautist, 86
- 13 May
  - Ricky Gardiner, guitarist, composer, worked with (David Bowie), (Iggy Pop), 73, Parkinsons.
  - Simon Preston, classical organist, conductor, and composer, 83
- 17 May – Rick Price, bassist (The Move) (Wizzard), 77
- 18 May
  - Cathal Coughlan, singer and musician, (Microdisney), (The Fatima Mansions), 61
  - Anne Howells, classical mezzo-soprano, 81
- 26 May
  - Andy Fletcher, keyboard player, DJ, (Depeche Mode), 60
  - Alan White, drummer, (Yes), (Plastic Ono Band), 72
- 8 June – David Lloyd-Jones, classical conductor and founder of Opera North, 87
- 2 July – Peter Brook, theatre and opera director, 97
- 4 July – Alan Blaikley, songwriter and composer, 82
- 5 July – Manny Charlton, rock guitarist (Nazareth), 81
- 9 July – Barbara Thompson, jazz saxophonist (Colosseum, Manfred Mann's Earth Band, Keef Hartley Band), 77
- 10 July – Andrew Ball, classical pianist, 72
- 11 July – Monty Norman, composer ("James Bond Theme"), 94
- 12 July – Bramwell Tovey, classical conductor and composer, 69
- 15 July – Paul Ryder, bassist, (Happy Mondays), 58
- 25 July – Martin How, classical composer and organist, 91
- 27 July
  - Bernard Cribbins, actor and singer ("Hole in the Ground", "Right Said Fred"), 93.
  - Tom Springfield, musician (The Springfields) and songwriter ("I'll Never Find Another You", "Georgy Girl"), 88
- 3 August – Nicky Moore, singer (Samson), 75
- 8 August
  - Darryl Hunt, bassist (The Pogues), 72
  - Olivia Newton-John, English-Australian singer, songwriter and actress, 73
- 11 August – Darius Campbell, Scottish singer ("Colourblind". "Incredible (What I Meant to Say)", "Girl in the Moon"), songwriter, musician, actor, film producer, 41.
- 15 August
  - Daphne Godson, classical violinist and founding member of the Scottish Baroque Ensemble, 90
  - Steve Grimmett, heavy metal singer (Grim Reaper, Onslaught, Lionsheart), 62
- 2 September – Drummie Zeb, English reggae musician (Aswad) and record producer, 62.
- 14 September – Paul Sartin, English folk singer, musician (Bellowhead, Faustus, Belshazzar's Feast) and composer, 51.
- 22 September – Stu Allan, dance music DJ (Clock) and record producer, 60, stomach cancer.
- 3 November – Noel McKoy, soul singer, 62.
- 8 November – Dan McCafferty, Scottish singer-songwriter, musician (Nazareth), 76.
- 10 November – Nik Turner, English musician, saxophonist and flautist (Hawkwind), 82.
- 11 November
  - Keith Levene, English guitarist, musician, founding member of (The Clash), (Public Image Ltd), 65.
  - Rab Noakes, Scottish singer-songwriter, musician (Stealers Wheel), 75.
- 21 November – Wilko Johnson, English guitarist, singer, songwriter, actor, (Dr. Feelgood), (The Blockheads), 75.
- 30 November – Christine McVie, English singer, musician, keyboardist, (Fleetwood Mac), (Chicken Shack), 79
- 3 December – Jamie Freeman, singer and songwriter, brain cancer, 57.
- 6 December – Jet Black, English drummer, (The Stranglers), 84.
- 10 December – Tracy Hitchings, English musician (Landmarq), 60, cancer.
- 13 December
  - Bayan Northcott, English music critic (The Independent, BBC Music Magazine) and composer, 82.
  - Kim Simmonds, Welsh rock singer and musician, (Savoy Brown), 75, colon cancer.
- 18 December
  - Martin Duffy, English keyboardist, (Primal Scream), (Felt), 55, complications from a fall.
  - Terry Hall, English singer, musician, (The Specials), (Fun Boy Three), (The Colourfield), 63.
- 23 December – Maxi Jazz, English musician, rapper, singer-songwriter, DJ.(Faithless), 65

== See also ==
- 2022 in British radio
- 2022 in British television
- 2022 in the United Kingdom
- List of British films of 2022
