= The Transports =

Folk ballad opera by Peter Bellamy

The Transports is a folk ballad opera written by Peter Bellamy released by Free Reed Records in 1977. It is often cited as Bellamy's greatest achievement. It featured many artists from the 1970s English folk revival, including The Watersons, Martin Carthy, Nic Jones, A. L. Lloyd, June Tabor, Martin Winsor, Cyril Tawney and Dave Swarbrick. The orchestral arrangements were by Dolly Collins.

It was named as his Folk Record of the Year by the folk music critic of The Guardian, Michael Grosvenor Myer.

== Performance history ==
The first performance was at Norwich Castle on 23 February 1978. 9 In addition to the two recorded performances, subsequent concert performances were at Kempton Park Racecourse (10 June 1978), Norwich Folk Festival (15 & 16 June 1978) and Rotterdam Folk Festival (5 July 1978 - both with original Norwich Castle cast), Chester Folk Club and the Herga Folk Club in Loughborough (1980), Bracknell Festival (12 July 1981), York University (1983), Queen Elizabeth Hall, London (South Bank Summer Folk Festival 1983), Norwich Folk Club (1984), Norwich School (1985), National Folk Festival, Perth, Australia, (1985), Portsmouth Festival (1987) and Whitby Festival (1992).

A dramatic production, incorporating straight acting as well as the songs, was staged by The Great Hall Players in Norwich from 17–22 October 1988. Another staging by Crude Apache Theatre Company was performed on 27 February 2013, at Dragon Hall, King Street, Norwich. The latter was attended by members of the Norwich Folk Club original cast, The Great Hall Players cast and friends and family of Pete Bellamy.

A new production, with musical arrangements by Paul Sartin, creative direction by Tim Dalling, and cast including Nancy Kerr, Greg Russell and the members of Faustus and The Young 'Uns was created in 2017 and released as an album. The company toured the UK during January to critical acclaim

== Cast (original release) ==
- Henry Cabell: Mike Waterson
- Susannah Holmes: Norma Waterson
- The Turnkey: Martin Carthy
- The Father: Nic Jones
- The Mother: June Tabor
- Abe Carman: A.L. Lloyd
- The Shantyman: Cyril Tawney
- The Convict: Martin Winsor
- The Coachman: Vic Legg
- The Transports: The Watersons
- Street Singer: Peter Bellamy

== Cast (40th Anniversary) ==
- Andy Bell: Live Sound & Producer
- Sean Cooney: Henry Kable
- Matthew Crampton: Narrator
- Tim Dalling: Creative Director
- David Eagle: Abe Carman
- Michael Hughes: The Coachman
- Nancy Kerr: The Mother
- Benji Kirkpatrick: The Convict
- Rachael McShane: Susannah Holmes
- Saul Rose: The Shantyman
- Greg Russell: John Simpson
- Paul Sartin: Musical Director & Arranger, The Father

== Synopsis ==
The story is based on an account of two convicts of the First Fleet, Henry Cabell and Susannah Holmes as given by Norfolk historian Eric Fowler. According to Fowler's research, which begins in 1783, young Henry Cabell receives a sentence of transportation for fourteen years for the burglary of a country house. Another youngster, Susannah Holmes, receives a sentence of transportation for an unrelated theft. They are imprisoned for three years (because Britain has recognised the United States and can no longer send convicts there) before being sent to New South Wales. While imprisoned they fall in love and produce a son. Refused permission to marry, Susannah (along with all the women) is to be sent alone in the First Fleet to Australia. When Susannah's son is refused passage at quayside a guard (John Simpson) takes pity on her and travels with the infant to London to appeal to the home secretary, Lord Sydney. Sydney, affected by the incident, orders that Cabell and Holmes should be reunited, married on English soil, and transported together with their son (although they were not married until their arrival in Australia). Cabell eventually becomes a constable in the new colony and enjoys commercial success.

== Recordings ==
"The Transports - Silver Edition" was released by Free Reed on the occasion of its 25th anniversary, with the original recordings and also re-recordings of many tracks by modern-day folk artists, FRDCD-2122.

=== Track listing (original release) ===
1. Overture (5:39)
2. Ballad of Henry & Susannah, Pt. 1 (1:02)
3. Us Poor Fellows (5:14)
4. Robber's Song (2:50)
5. Ballad of Henry & Susannah, Pt. 2 (2:16)
6. Leaves in the Woodland (4:52)
7. Ballad of Henry & Susannah, Pt. 3 (2:34)
8. I Once Lived in Service (4:50)
9. Norwich Gaol (4:45)
10. Sweet Loving Friendship (3:43)
11. Ballad of Henry & Susannah, Pt. 4 (2:57)
12. Black and Bitter Night (7:10)
13. Humane Turnkey (1) (1:49)
14. Plymouth Mail (4:25)
15. Humane Turnkey (2) (1:07)
16. Green Fields of England (4:27)
17. Roll Down (2:20)
18. Still and Silent Ocean (5:32)
19. Ballad of Henry & Susannah, Pt. 5 (4:24)
20. Convict's Wedding (3:23)
