= Faustus (band) =

Folk rock band

- Origin: Hampshire, Shropshire, Hertfordshire, UK
- Genre: English folk music
- Instruments: Vocals, fiddle, guitar, melodeon, oboe, bouzouki, cor anglais, banjo, mandolin
- Years active: 1998–2022
- Labels: Fellside; Navigator; West End Music; Westpark Music
- Past members: Benji Kirkpatrick; Saul Rose; Paul Sartin (1998 - 2022, his death); Pete Flood (2010); James Fagan (2010)
- Website: faustusband.com

Faustus were a folk music band based in the UK. The all-male membership brought together multi-instrumentalist musicians active across many other leading bands in the UK folk scene: Benji Kirkpatrick (Seth Lakeman Band, Bellowhead, Steeleye Span), Saul Rose (Waterson–Carthy, Whapweasel) and Paul Sartin (Bellowhead, Belshazzar's Feast). They were described as “bloke-folk” and aiming to “rescue contemporary folk from the curse of feyness” (The Independent). In 2007 they received a 75th anniversary award from the English Folk Dance and Song Society, and they were nominated as best group at the 2009 BBC Radio 2 Folk Awards.

== Origins (1998–2004) ==
Faustus evolved out of an earlier four-piece band, Dr Faustus, featuring Sartin and Kirkpatrick alongside melodeon player and singer Tim van Eyken and concertina player Robert Harbron.
Sartin and Kirkpatrick had been playing together for a number of years, and were looking to expand their work with others to explore traditional English music. Sartin met van Eyken and Harbron while performing the Mick Ryan opera A Day's Work at Salisbury Playhouse. The band's name came from the traditional tune Dr Fauster's Tumblers rather than the Christopher Marlowe play of the same name.
The early years of the band were spent playing for the charities Superact and Live Music Now, putting live music into schools, prisons, hospitals and other venues.
In 2002–03 the band recorded their first album The First Cut on Fellside recordings, and toured it through UK folk clubs and venues. They received a nomination for the Horizon Award (best new artist) at the 2004 BBC Radio 2 Folk Awards.

== Wager and disbandment (2005) ==
The band also recorded their second album, Wager (2005) on Fellside.
The album was toured, but afterwards rather than continue together the group disbanded to focus on other musical projects, including Bellowhead (of which Sartin and Kirkpatrick were founder members), Waterson–Carthy, van Eyken's solo work, and Harbron's duo with Emma Reid.

== Reformation (2006–09) ==
Sartin and Kirkpatrick decided to reform the band, with the addition of their friend melodeon player Saul Rose, in 2006.
The resurrected band was renamed Faustus to reflect the slightly different line-up.
The band were active on the UK folk music circuit, and received English Folk Dance and Song Society 75th anniversary awards in 2007, to commemorate their significant contributions to the development and continuity of traditional English folk music, song and dance.
The band released the eponymous Faustus album in 2008 on Navigator Records, and were nominated for Best Group at the 2009 BBC Radio 2 Folk Awards. They lost out to Lau (band).

== Hiatus (2010–11) ==
Kirkpatrick took on a prominent role in Seth Lakeman’s band during 2010, and the band briefly expanded to include Bellowhead drummer and percussionist Pete Flood and Australian singer/guitar/bouzouki player James Fagan, best known for his work with Nancy Kerr. The band appeared as a four-piece outfit, and occasionally a five-piece group when Kirkpatrick's touring commitments allowed.
An official hiatus took place while Rose performed in the Royal National Theatre’s production of War Horse (play), a role previously undertaken by Tim van Eyken.

== 2011–2022 ==
During 2011 Kirkpatrick stood back from his commitments to the Seth Lakeman Band, and the National Theatre replaced the War Horse cast, enabling Faustus to come together again.
Their second album under the Faustus name, Broken Down Gentlemen, was released on Navigator Records in spring 2013. The band have undertaken twice-yearly tours, and performed at folk festivals all over the UK, Europe and New Zealand.
During 2013 the band collaborated with dance group Morris Offspring to produce a work called The Furnace, which combined high energy morris dancing with Faustus's music.
In 2016 Faustus became Artists in Residence at Halsway Manor, the National Centre for the Folk Arts, in Somerset. Their work at Halsway has seen them using the centre collections to explore developing arrangements of rare traditional folk music.
A third Faustus album, Death and Other Animals, was released on the West Park Music label in Autumn 2016. The album was recorded at Halsway Manor, and features songs from the centre's extensive collection. This album was awarded the Preis der Deutschen Schallplattenkritik for folk music in early 2017.
Paul Sartin died suddenly on September 14, 2022, at the age of 51. Kirkpatrick and Rose subsequently performed a small number of dates in the weeks following Sartin's death.

== Band members ==
- Benji Kirkpatrick – (1998–2022) – guitar, bouzouki, mandolin, banjo, vocals
- Saul Rose – (2006–2022) – melodeon (accordion), vocals
- Paul Sartin – (1998–2022) – oboe, violin, cor anglais, vocals

as Dr Faustus

- Tim van Eyken – (1998–2005) – melodeon, vocals
- Robert Harbron – (1998–2005) – concertina, bassoon, vocals

as Faustus

- Pete Flood – (2010) – drums, percussion
- James Fagan – (2010) – guitar, bouzouki, vocals

== Discography ==
as Dr Faustus

- 2001 Evolving Tradition 3 (one track, Dr Faustus Set) Mrs Casey Recordings
- 2003 The First Cut Fellside Records
- 2004 Cutting Edge (Fellside compilation) (one track – The Beggarman)
- 2005 Wager Fellside Records

as Faustus

- 2008 Faustus Navigator Records
- 2013 Broken Down Gentlemen Navigator Records
- 2016 Death and Other Animals Westpark Music
- 2019 Cotton Lords EP – Five Songs of the Lancashire Cotton Famine Westpark Music
