= Friday Afternoons =

Collection of songs by Benjamin Britten

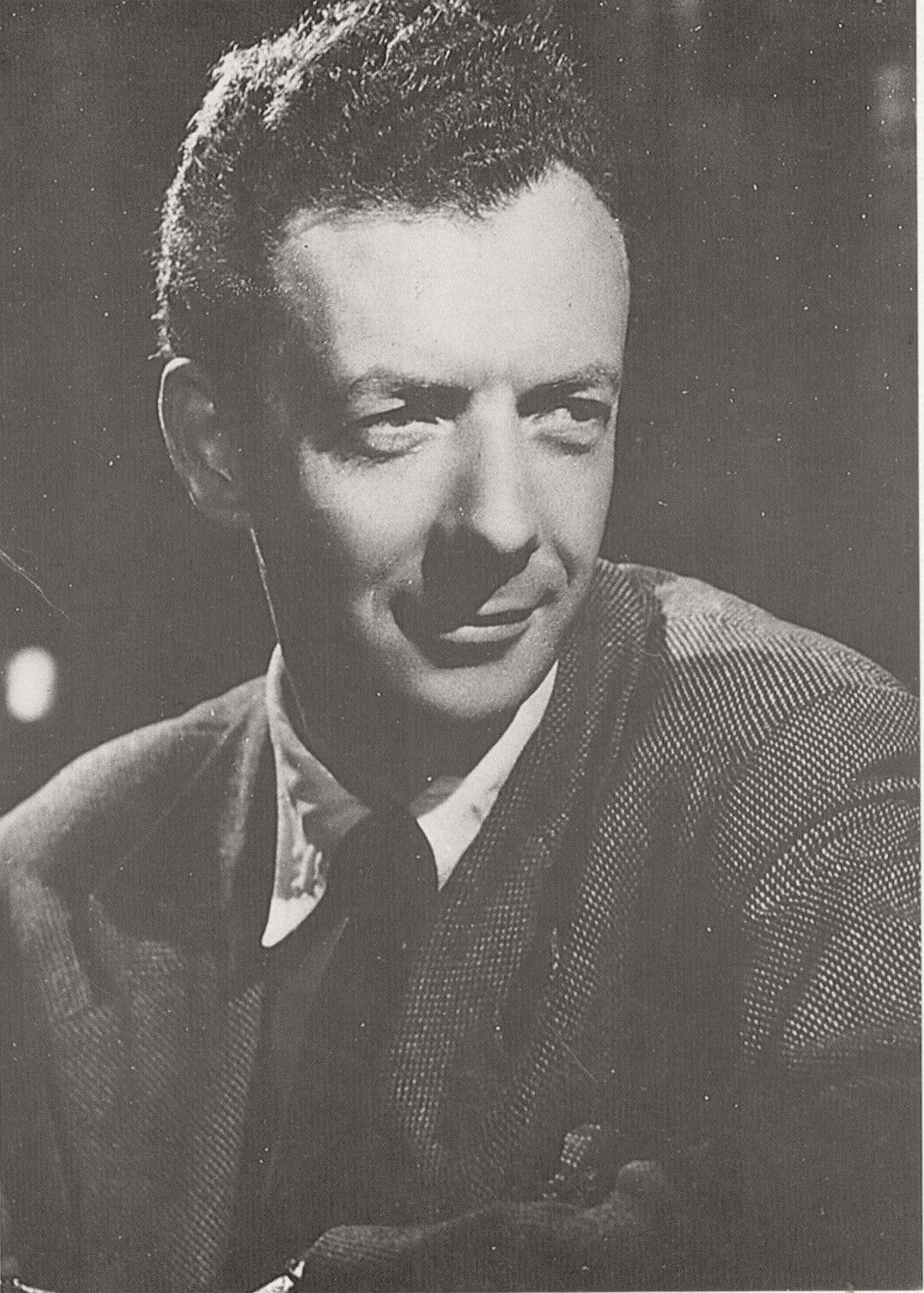
Benjamin Britten in the 1940s

Friday Afternoons is a collection of twelve song settings by Benjamin Britten, composed 1933–35 for the pupils of Clive House School, Prestatyn, Wales where his brother, Robert, was headmaster. Two of the songs, "Cuckoo" and "Old Abram Brown", were featured in the film Moonrise Kingdom. "A New Year Carol" was included in the soundtrack of the film Challengers.

== Composition ==
Not long after graduating from the Royal College of Music, Britten started composing his collection of mostly unison songs (the last song, "Old Abram Brown", being in canon) to texts he selected from Walter de la Mare's anthology Come Hither. Britten noted in his diary on 2 November 1933 (just over a month before his twentieth birthday) that he had composed that afternoon "a song, for R.H.M.B. & Clive House, very light & bad – 'I mun be married a Sunday'". "Ee-Oh!" followed on 19 December.

There was no further mention in Britten’s diary of composing school songs until May 1934, when he spent time with Robert at Clive House and helped by coaching pupils in cricket and taking singing classes. He then resumed work on his songs, including "A New Year Carol", a setting of the traditional "Levy-Dew". He completed the collection in August 1935 with the song "Begone, Dull Care".

The title of the collection was originally Twelve Songs for Schools, but at the suggestion of Robert Britten was changed to Friday Afternoons, since class singing was held at Clive House at that time in the week. Britten dedicated Friday Afternoons "To R.H.M. Britten and the boys of Clive House, Prestatyn".

== Songs ==
1. "Begone, Dull Care" (Anon.)
2. "A Tragic Story" (Thackeray)
3. "Cuckoo!" (Jane Taylor)
4. "Ee-Oh!" (Anon.)
5. "A New Year Carol" (Anon., ed. Walter de la Mare)
6. "I Mun Be Married on Sunday" (Nicholas Udall)
7. "There Was a Man of Newington" (Anon.)
8. "Fishing Song" (Izaak Walton)
9. "The Useful Plough" (Anon.)
10. "Jazz-Man" (Eleanor Farjeon)
11. "There Was a Monkey" (Anon.)
12. "Old Abram Brown" (Anon.)

== Critical reception ==
The classical music writer Michael Oliver has said that Friday Afternoons exemplifies Britten's ability to write melodies of the kind which "insists on being sung and, once sung, lodges in the memory." John Bridcut has pointed out that Britten's use of canon in "Old Abram Brown" – a "little coup de maître [which] makes the funeral march great fun to sing" — was a technique he was to reuse in several future works such as A Ceremony of Carols ("This Little Babe") and Noye's Fludde. When the first recording was made of almost the entire collection (omitting "Ee-oh") by the Choir of Downside School, Purley on Decca, reviewer Diana McVeagh in The Musical Times described some of the songs having "a spell-binding enchantment — A New Year Carol is as healing as 'Jack shall have Jill' in The Dream."
