= Belshazzar's Feast (band) =

English folk music duo

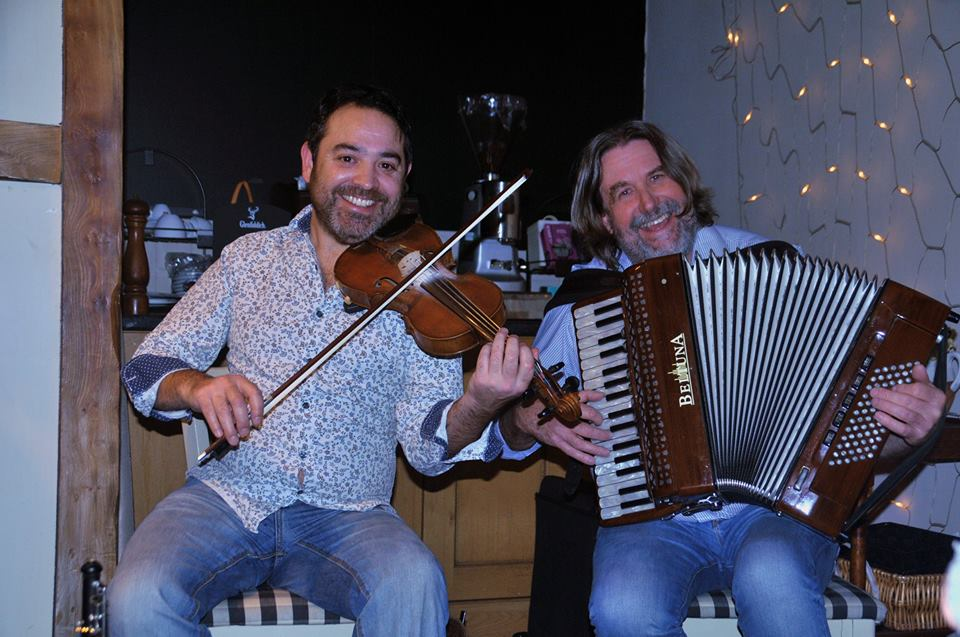
- Belshazzar's Feast at The Bell Inn, Adderbury, on 26 November 2016 by Suzanne Peedell.

Background information
- Also known as: FeastieBoys
- Origin: Oxfordshire/Dorset, England
- Genres: English folk music, comedy
- Instruments: violin, oboe, cor anglais, piano accordion, vocals, slide whistle
- Years active: 1995–2022
- Label: Unearthed (previously Wild Goose)
- Website: belshazzarsfeast.com

Belshazzar's Feast were an English folk music duo comprising singer/oboist/fiddler Paul Sartin and piano accordionist Paul Hutchinson. They have a reputation for slapstick spoken, physical and musical comedy as well as fine musicianship.

== Origins ==
Sartin and Hutchinson met in the mid-1990s when they were both members of the folk-rock band Life Of Reilly, which existed to write music to satirise the construction of the Newbury bypass. After a few performances they left the band to form a duo. They began working for ceilidhs and social dances, working with caller Andrew Shaw on a project exploring the work of the 18th-century composer Nathaniel Kynaston, which led to two albums, Mr Kynaston’s Famous Dance volume 1 (2000) and volume 2 (2002). Another album drawn from the social dance repertoire, John Playford’s Secret Ball, followed in 2001.

During 1996 and 1997, Sartin and Hutchinson formed the core of the Breeze Band, backing the Scottish singer Ian Bruce. Two recordings were released, A Kind and Gentle Nature (WildGoose 277) and Annie Laurie (Ruglen 103), while the band played some UK dates and undertook a tour of Germany.

As Belshazzar's Feast their other early recordings were song and tune sets, showcasing a developing concert repertoire, One Too Many in 1996, Drop The Reed in 1998, albeit displaying the same irreverent twist that distinguished them from the social dance norm. The title track One Too Many was written by musician Ian F Ball and published in a book of tunes of the same name. They toured America and Belgium during this time, mostly playing for social dances.

The duo formed the basis of ceilidh outfits Belshazzar's Dance Band (Sartin, Hutchinson plus Mark Powell) and, briefly, Bazza's Dog, an amalgamation of Belshazzar's Feast, Hoover the Dog and Mark Powell.

== Career ==
After a hiatus where other work took precedence, they relaunched Belshazzar's Feast in 2008 with the album Food of Love.

Their first winter/Christmas-themed album, Frost Bites, followed in 2009, which earned them a nomination for Best Duo at the 2010 BBC Radio 2 Folk Awards. A second winter-themed album, Stocking Fillers, was released in 2012.

Another album of concert material, Find The Lady, was released in 2011. This album had elements of the pair's spoken comedy included in some, but not all, of the tracks.

Belshazzar's Feast generally undertook two tours per year, one in the spring and one in the run up to Christmas. In addition, when not touring, they worked together for charity organisation Superact, putting music into places where a formal concert would not work – for example in hospitals or care homes. They were the support band for Bellowhead's tour of the UK in 2009.

They celebrated twenty years of working together in 2014 with a live album, The Whiting's on the Wall. This had between-song patter in separate tracks from the music. The cover art for this album was produced by Simon Drew.

Paul Sartin died suddenly on September 14, 2022, at the age of 51.

== Humour ==
The duo performed three distinct types of humour as part of their act.

Their spoken between-song patter often included word-based puns based on song titles or the text of the lyrics. They also had an element of physical comedy, either indicated with their instruments, facial expressions or body language, or by inviting audience members up to the stage. In addition, humour appeared in their music, for example by slipping pieces of well-known tunes such as the Postman Pat theme or the Christmas carol "Silent Night" into the middle of their material without warning.

== Associated acts ==
In addition to having played together in Life of Reilly, both Sartin and Hutchinson have been active in many other projects and groups. Sartin was part of Dr Faustus, Bellowhead and Faustus in addition to his work as a composer, arranger and conductor. Hutchinson has played with Pagoda Project, Hoover The Dog and the Playford Liberation Front. In addition, Hutchinson is a composer, arranger and workshop leader (Marlborough College, Cecil Sharp House, Dartington and Benslow Music Centre).

== Partial discography ==
1996: One Too Many (Terra Nova TERRCD022)
1998: Drop The Reed (WildGoose WGS293CD)
2000: Mr Kynaston's Famous Dance (vol 1) (WildGoose WGS298CD)
2001: John Playford's Secret Ball (WildGoose WGS304CD)
2002: Mr Kynaston's Famous Dance (vol 2) (WildGoose WGS314CD)
2008: The Food of Love (WildGoose 353CD)
2009: Frost Bites (WildGoose 366 CD)
2011: Find The Lady (Unearthed TPLP1080CD)
2012: Stocking Fillers (Unearthed B008YBADAO)
2014: The Whiting's on the Wall (Unearthed B00ISKT5NM)
