= Making Music (organisation) =

- Formation: February 23, 1935
- Type: Umbrella arts organisation, Not for profit
- Legal status: A company limited by guarantee. Registered in England and Wales no. 308632. Registered Charity in England and Wales no. 249219 and in Scotland no. SC038849
- Headquarters: 8 Holyrood Street, London, United Kingdom SE1 2EL
- Location: UK
- Key people: Barbara Eifler, Chief Executive
- Website: www.makingmusic.org.uk
- Formerly called: National Federation of Music Societies

Making Music (formerly the National Federation of Music Societies) is a UK membership organisation for leisure-time music groups of all musical genres, representing over 200,000 musicians and promoters of all levels and experience. Making Music provides them with practical services, guidance, artistic development opportunities and a collective voice for advocacy.

== Mission ==
Making Music aims at supporting, standing for and celebrating groups of people who make and present music in their leisure time across the UK.

The organisation plans to do this in four ways.

1. Lobbying and advocacy: creating opportunities to take part in music making, and conveying the needs of its members to decision-makers in government and elsewhere.
2. Practical resources: guidance, tools and discounts.
3. Networking and development: training events to provide support via a team of managers in England, Scotland, Wales and Northern Ireland.
4. Artistic support: Making Music selects professional artists and negotiates their rates for leisure-time music groups; has a Music Bank offering repertoire searching, a member sheet music exchange and programme notes; and national and local projects for members to take part in to develop themselves, their members and their audiences.

== History ==
The National Federation of Music Societies (NFMS) was founded in York on 23 February 1935 primarily to support amateur music groups in the wake of the Great Depression. At the time, there was concern about how the economy was affecting professional musicians. Amateur choirs, orchestras and music clubs were struggling to survive, and, as a result, they were offering fewer engagements to professional artists. A group of influential musicians decided to create Regional Federations of Music Societies to help amateur choirs and orchestras to exchange information and music, avoid clashes of concert dates and arrange professional artist tours in order to make their events more financially viable. By the end of 1934 there were 11 federations representing 486 societies. In 1935, these federations united to form the NFMS with the support of the Carnegie UK Trust and at the instigation of Frederick Woodhouse of the Incorporated Society of Musicians and Sir George Dyson (1883-1964), the first chairman and President.

Historically they distributed public funding to music societies, beginning in 1935 with those of The Carnegie UK Trust in 1935. When The Council for the Encouragement of Music and the Arts (CEMA) was created, it invited them to allocate funds to larger performing societies and music clubs who were not eligible for support from Carnegie. This role continued when CEMA became the Arts Council of Great Britain in 1945. They stopped administering national funds to amateur music groups in England in 1984, but did continue this practice until 2007 with funds provided at a regional level by some of the English Regional Arts Boards. And in Scotland they continued to provide this role for the Scottish Arts Council until it became Creative Scotland in 2011.

In 2000, the NFMS rebranded to Making Music to reflect the diverse nature of the leisure-time music sector and its membership.

As of September 2023, they are no longer offering insurance schemes as a membership service due to their partnership with insurance broker Marsh and insurance underwriters RSA Insurance Group ending.

== The organisation ==
Making Music is a registered charity with an office in London and a team of managers in England, Scotland, Wales and Northern Ireland.

It has seven non-executive directors on its Board of Trustees, who work for the organisation on a voluntary basis, and are responsible for the overall running of the organisation with the Chief Executive, Barbara Eifler.

Making Music has full and part-time members of staff. Most are based in London and look after administration, finance, member services and communications. Making Music's three managers in England, Scotland and Wales work alongside a team of volunteers to support the members’ needs with their region or country.

== Services and resources ==
Making Music is a membership organisation that offers a comprehensive range of financial, artistic and administrative services as well as development and training opportunities to leisure-time music groups. It also campaigns on behalf of the leisure-time music sector and its members at a national and local level.

The organisation offers services that include a PRS for Music royalty payment scheme; child protection advice and criminal records checks; discount artists booking schemes; music bank; and a range of resources from marketing concerts and growing membership to advice on the roles of committee members and recruiting a new musical director.

Making Music works to create partnerships with media organisations, musical organisations and charities to develop opportunities for their members. Past and current partnerships include the BBC Radio 3, Classic FM, the Southbank Centre, the Musicians Benevolent Fund, Sound and Music, PRS for Music Foundation, St Martins in the Fields, Sing Up, British Association of Barbershop Singers and Superact.
