= Sweet Visitor =

Studio album by Nancy Kerr
- Released: 2014
- Genre: Folk
- Length: 44:44
- Label: Little Dish Records
- Producer: Andy Bell

Nancy Kerr chronology
The Full English (2014)	Sweet Visitor (2014)	Instar (2016)

Professional ratings
Review scores
Source	Rating
The Daily Telegraph	3.5/5 stars
The Guardian	3/5 stars

Sweet Visitor is an album by the English singer-songwriter and multi-instrumentalist Nancy Kerr, which was released by Little Dish Records in 2014.

== Reception ==
In a review of Sweet Visitor for The Telegraph, Martin Chilton stated that "Nancy Kerr has a distinguished track record working with other folk stars (Eliza Carthy, James Fagan and the recent Elizabethan Session octet) but shows in her debut solo album that she can lead from the front. Her fiddle playing is as exquisite as ever (especially on Apollo on the Docks) and she sings with an easy lilting charm." In a review for The Guardian, Robin Denselow stated "This is a pleasantly classy set of her own compositions, dominated by her fine, easygoing singing and fiddle work, which is at times more distinctive than her folk-influenced songs themselves."

== Track listing ==
All compositions by Nancy Kerr.

1. "Never Ever Lay Them Down" – 4:49
2. "Hard Songs" – 4:24
3. "My Little Drummer" – 2:24
4. "Lie Low" – 4:18
5. "Sickle and Harvest" – 3:56
6. "The Priest's Garden" – 3:55
7. "Where Jacarandas Grow" – 4:06
8. "The Bunting and the Crown" – 4:06
9. "Apollo on the Docks" – 3:53
10. "Now is the Time" – 5:35
11. "Days a Little Darker" – 3:49

== Personnel ==
- Nancy Kerr – voice, fiddle, viola, cello, guitar, autoharp
- James Fagan – guitar, bouzouki, voice
- Tom Wright – drums, percussion
- Tim Yates – double bass
- Robert Harbron – English concertina, banjo
- Jess Arrowsmith – voice
- Emily Smith – voice
- Tim Van Eyken – melodeon, voice
- Martin Simpson – guitar, voice
