= Paul Sartin =

English singer (1973–2022)

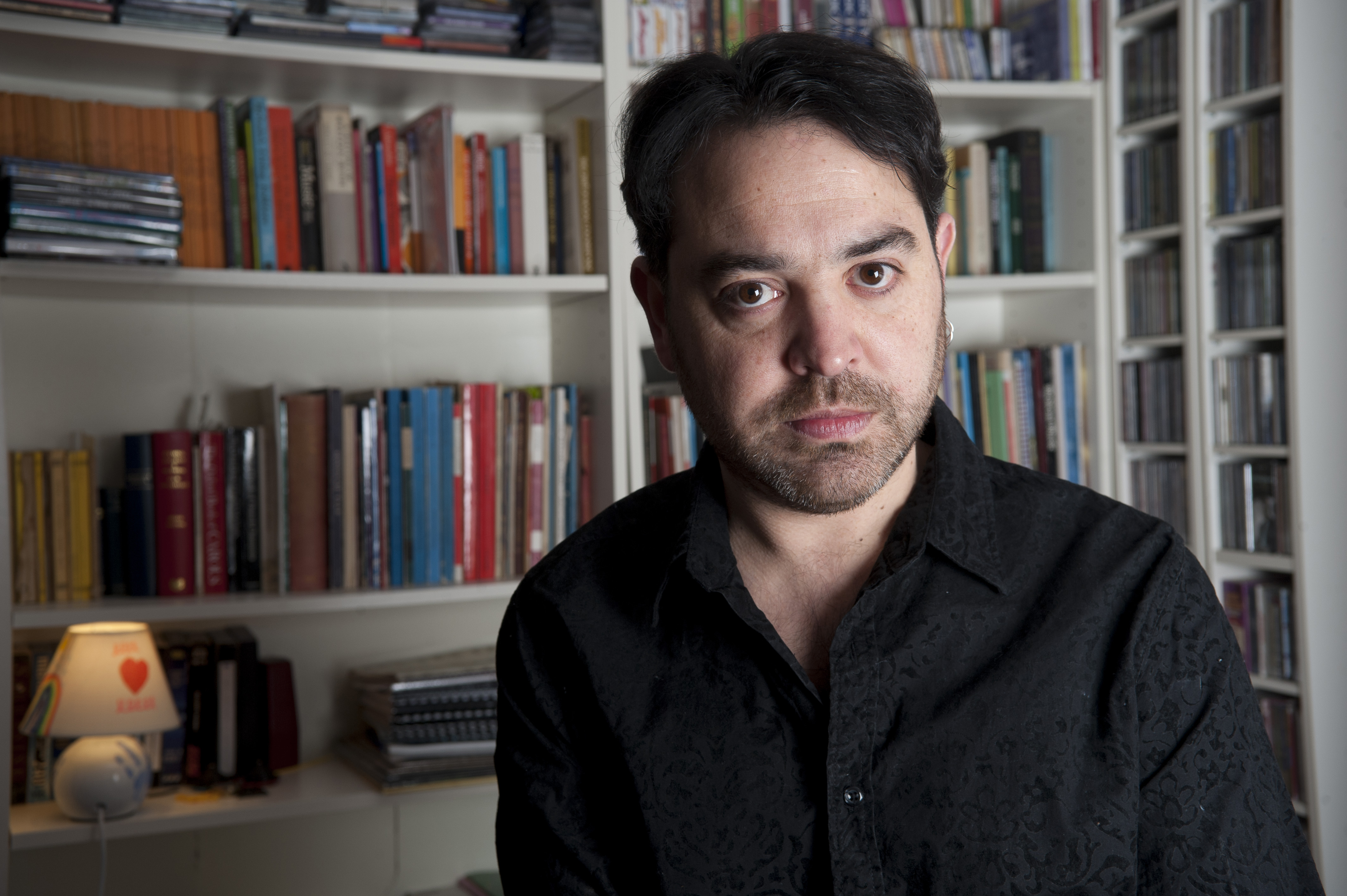
- Sartin in 2016

Background information
- Born: 20 February 1971
- Origin: Willesden, London, England
- Died: 14 September 2022 (aged 51)
- Genres: English folk music, choirs, contemporary composition
- Instruments: Vocals, oboe, violin, cor anglais
- Years active: 1995–2022
- Labels: Fellside; Navigator; West End Music

Paul Sartin (20 February 1971 – 14 September 2022) was an English singer, instrumentalist, composer and arranger, specialising in oboe and violin. He was best known for his work with the folk band Bellowhead, but also played with three-piece Faustus and the folk/comedy duo Belshazzar's Feast.

== Early life ==
Sartin was brought up in Willesden, London. He was educated at Anson Primary School, Highgate School, on an assisted place, and subsequently moved to the Purcell School for Young Musicians, again on an assisted place from Brent music service. Between school and university, he played oboe with a musical theatre troupe called Gloria, and the English National Opera's Baylis project. He then took up a choral scholarship at Magdalen College, Oxford, where he gained a 2:1 in music.

== Career ==
Upon leaving Oxford University, Sartin sang as a lay clerk at Christ Church Cathedral, Oxford, a post he held for five years. During that period, he gained a diploma – Licentiate of the Royal Schools of Music – and was invited to join the band Life Of Reilly, which at that time also included his future collaborator Paul Hutchinson. However, in 1995 they left to form the duo Belshazzar's Feast The duo began performing for ceilidhs and social dances, but grew a concert repertoire and a reputation for musical comedy.

In 1998, he formed the folk band Dr Faustus, with Tim van Eyken, Benji Kirkpatrick and Robert Harbron, with the intention of playing English folk music. The band undertook outreach work with charities Superact and Live Music Now, and produced two albums – The First Cut and Wager – before splitting in 2005.

He took up a position as vocal tutor at St Edward's School, Oxford in 1999, commenced singing as deputy lay clerk in Winchester Cathedral choir in 2000, and began directing the Andover Museum Loft Singers, a non-auditioning community choir based in Andover, Hampshire, in 2001.

In 2004 John Spiers and Jon Boden invited Sartin and Kirkpatrick to join their new 11-piece band Bellowhead. The band, with Sartin on violin, oboe and backing vocals, released one EP and five studio albums over their 12-year duration. Two of those albums went silver. They were nominated and won many BBC Radio 2 Folk Awards over the years, including Best Live Act on five occasions. Their music was playlisted on BBC Radio 2, they made appearances on Later... with Jools Holland on BBC2, and appeared at festivals all around the UK, continental Europe and Canada, as well as touring regularly. Bellowhead ended in Spring 2016.

Sartin achieved a distinction in his master's degree in Traditional Music in 2005, from Newcastle University, where he became a visiting tutor.

Faustus, a continuation of Dr Faustus which combined Sartin and Kirkpatrick with Saul Rose, was formed in 2006. The band produced an album, Faustus in 2008, had a hiatus during 2010–11, and made their second album Broken Down Gentlemen in 2013. In Faustus Sartin shared lead vocals alongside his oboe, cor anglais, and violin duties. All three members received English Folk Dance and Song Society 75th anniversary awards in 2007, to commemorate their significant contributions to the development and continuity of traditional English folk music, song and dance. Faustus were nominated for Best Group at the 2009 BBC Radio 2 Folk Awards.

In 2010 Sartin joined Jon Boden and the Remnant Kings, with whom he toured occasionally. Belshazzar's Feast also received a nomination for Best Duo at the 2010 BBC Radio 2 Folk Awards.

The Bellowhead Songbook, edited by Sartin, was published by Faber Music and issued in 2014. Made In The Great War, a piece devised around the history of a pre-war violin in Sam Sweeney's possession, toured annually for several years from 2014. Sartin played oboe, cor anglais and violin in the work.

He also composed, notably numerous works for theatre. Works include The Hartlepool Monkey for Streetwise Opera, nominated for a BASCA award; a revamp of Peter Bellamy's The Transports for Sidmouth Folk Festival in 2011; Changing Places… or What Dobbin Saw for Broadstairs Folk Festival; and The Seven Joys of Mary for the Choir of Somerville College, Oxford.

== Post-Bellowhead ==
Sartin compiled, composed and produced Community Choirs: Folk for Faber Music in 2016. Faustus released a third album, Death and Other Animals, in Autumn 2016. He was musical director, arranger and performer in a revised production of The Transports, which toured in 2017. He was the co-founder of the Whitchurch Folk Club where he helped to further knowledge of the songs of Henry Lee, collected by George Gardiner.

Sartin died suddenly of a heart attack on 14 September 2022 at the age of 51, as confirmed by a statement put out by his family on 15 September. A subsequent statement, on 18 September, stated that he collapsed suddenly prior to taking the stage at an engagement in Oxford. He was in the company of his bandmate, Saul Rose, at the time.

== Broadcasting ==
Sartin hosted BBC Four's Christmas session, broadcast in 2009, which featured Bellowhead and Belshazzar's Feast alongside Jim Moray, The Unthanks, Thea Gilmore and Lisa Knapp. He has also appeared on BBC Radio 2's Clare Balding Show and BBC Radio 3's In Tune and The Choir. In 2016 he appeared on BBC Radio 4's Playing The Skyline, composing and playing music based on a view of Oxfordshire. In August 2022 he talked about Vaughan Williams's relationship to English folk music on BBC Radio 4's Front Row.

== Awards and nominations ==
=== At BBC Radio 2 Folk Awards ===
The BBC Radio 2 Folk Awards are an annual awards ceremony held to celebrate achievement among folk artists that year.

Year	Nominee / work	Award	Result
2014	as part of Bellowhead	Best Group	Nominated
2013	as part of Bellowhead	Best Group	Nominated
2013	Broadside (as part of Bellowhead)	Best Album	Won
2012	as part of Bellowhead	Best Group	Nominated
2012	as part of Bellowhead	Best Live Act	Nominated
2011
2011	as part of Bellowhead	Best Group	Won
2011	as part of Bellowhead	Best Live Act	Won
2011	Hedonism (as part of Bellowhead)	Best Album	Nominated
2011	New York Girls (as part of Bellowhead)	Best Traditional Track	Nominated
2010	as part of Bellowhead	Best Group	Nominated
2010	as part of Bellowhead	Best Live Act	Won
2010	as Belshazzar's Feast	Best Duo	Nominated
2009	as part of Bellowhead	Best Group	Nominated
2009	as part of Bellowhead	Best Live Act	Nominated
2009	Fakenham Fair (as part of Bellowhead)	Best Traditional Track	Nominated
2009	as Faustus	Best Group	Nominated
2008	as part of Bellowhead	Best Group	Nominated
2008	as part of Bellowhead	Best Live Act	Won
2007	as part of Bellowhead	Best Group	Won
2007	as part of Bellowhead	Best Live Act	Won
2006	as part of Bellowhead	Best Group	Nominated
2006	as part of Bellowhead	Best Live Act	Nominated
2005	as part of Bellowhead	Best Group	Nominated
2005	as part of Bellowhead	Best Live Act	Won
2004	as part of Dr Faustus	Horizon Award for Best New Act	Nominated

=== Other awards ===
In 2007 Sartin, as part of Faustus, received an English Folk Dance and Song Society 75th anniversary award to commemorate a significant contribution to the development and continuity of traditional English folk music, song and dance. Bellowhead's Hedonism, featuring Sartin, won Best Album in the FRoots Magazine Critic's Poll in 2010. In 2011 Sartin's composition The Hartlepool Monkey for Streetwise Opera was nominated for a BASCA award. He was posthumously awarded the Fatea Lifetime Achievement Award for 2022.

== Selected discography ==
2019 Cotton Lords EP Faustus (Westpark 87381)
2016 Death and Other Animals Faustus (Westpark B01KYUOR3G)
2016 Live: The Farewell Tour Bellowhead (Navigator B01BILZ0G8)
2014 Revival Bellowhead (Universal/Island B00JSHKGOG)
2014 The Whiting's On The Wall Belshazzar's Feast (Unearthed B00ISKT5NM)
2013 Broken Down Gentlemen Faustus (Navigator B00AWKW13C)
2012 Broadside Bellowhead, (Navigator B0085KAMOQ)
2012 Stocking Fillers Belshazzar's Feast, (Unearthed B008YBADAO)
2010 Hedonism Bellowhead, (Navigator 042)
2010 Find the Lady Belshazzar's Feast, (Unearthed TPLP1080CD)
2009 Frost Bites Belshazzar's Feast (WildGoose 366 CD)
2008 The Food of Love Belshazzar's Feast, (WildGoose 353CD)
2007 Faustus Faustus, (Navigator 5)
2007 Matachin Bellowhead, (Navigator 17X)
2006 Live at Christ Church Dublin Cathedral Choir
2006 Burlesque Bellowhead, (Westpark 87132)
2005 Wager Dr Faustus, (Fellside FTCD189)
2004 Eponymous Bellowhead, (Megaphone 111)
2004 Waiting for Angels Martin Carthy, (Topic TSCD527)
2003 The First Cut Dr Faustus (Fellside B0000C666X)
1998 Foot and Mouth Dansaul (Dansaul ds01)

== Notable publications ==
- 2016 Community Choirs Folk (Faber Music, ISBN 0571539343)
- 2014 Bellowhead songbook (Faber Music, ISBN 0571538290)
- 2006 Hampshire Dance Tunes (Hobgoblin, ISBN 0955408202)
- 2001 Mr Kynaston's Famous Dance (Wild Goose, ASIN B0000AUHO2, EAN 0706127086520)
