= Levy-Dew =

Traditional song

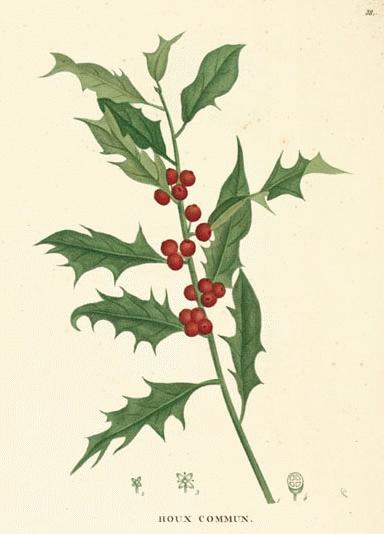
Sprigs of evergreen plants such as holly are used to sprinkle people with well water in a custom associated with this song.

"Levy-Dew", also known as "A New Year Carol" and "Residue", is a British folk song of Welsh origin traditionally sung in New Year celebrations. It is associated with a New Year's Day custom involving sprinkling people with water newly drawn from a well. The song was set to music by Benjamin Britten in 1934.

== Lyric ==
As with any traditional folk song, there are a number of variations. What is now regarded as the standard version is attested from 1849 onwards. Substantially the same wording was included by Walter de la Mare in Tom Tiddler's Ground (1931), an anthology of verse for children. De la Mare's version runs:

Here we bring new water from the well so clear,
For to worship God with, this happy New Year.

Chorus (after each verse):
Sing levy-dew, sing levy-dew, the water and the wine,
The seven bright gold wires and the bugles that do shine.

Sing reign of Fair Maid, with gold upon her toe;
Open you the West Door and turn the Old Year go.

Sing reign of Fair Maid, with gold upon her chin;
Open you the East Door and let the New Year in.

Benjamin Britten set the De la Mare version of the song to music as "A New Year Carol" in 1934.

== Traditions ==
The song is associated with Pembrokeshire. There, it figured in a custom in which, on New Year's Day, children collect fresh water from a well, and go around with a sprig from an evergreen tree, which they use to sprinkle the faces of passers-by with the water while singing the carol and begging for gifts of food or money. Elsewhere in Wales, the custom is called dwr newy, "new water", and the water was also used to lustrate rooms and doors of houses.

This ceremony has a parallel in the Scottish Hogmanay tradition of saining; here water drawn from a "dead and living ford", a ford crossed by both the living and the dead, is sprinkled through the house, and then juniper branches are burnt for the smoke indoors. The purpose of the rite is to sain, or purify, the house for the new year.

== Interpretations ==
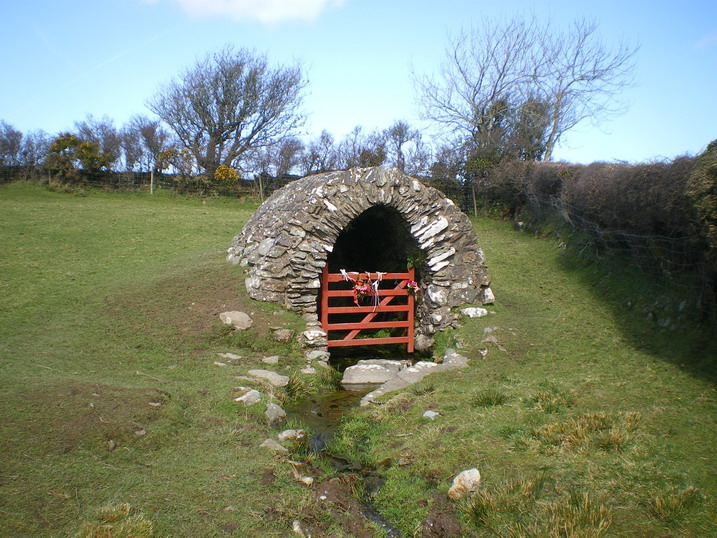
Llanllawer Holy Well, an ancient spring at Cwm Gwaun, Pembrokeshire

According to Trefor Owen, the song preserves "an early well-cult made acceptable to medieval Christianity by its association with the Virgin and perpetuated both by the desire to wish one's neighbour well at the beginning of a new year and by the small monetary payment involved." Similar speculations from the nineteenth century have sought to link the mysterious maidens of the song with the goddess Aurora, bearing the gold of the rising and setting sun on her head and feet.

The meaning of the words "levy-dew" in the original lyrics of the song is not certainly known. One line of speculation holds that the words represent the Welsh phrase llef ar Dduw or llef y Dduw, "a cry to God". Others connect it to Middle English levedy ("lady"), or to the French phrase levez à Dieu, "raise to God", which may in turn refer to the elevation of the Host in Christian liturgy.

== Variant ==
The folk group Waterson:Carthy performed the song on their 2006 album Holy Heathens and the Old Green Man, but in this case the chorus begins "Residue, sing Residue". Martin Carthy's liner notes tentatively credit the variant wording to an informant from the East Riding of Yorkshire named Bert Hodgeson, and comment that "None of us can figure out the possible significance of the 'Residue sing Residue' chorus and neither could Bert – or whoever it was – but that was, he said, what was sung to him." The words may be a mondegreen. The recorded version also omits the stanza related to the water ritual, but adds two original verses in which the new year is welcomed through the south gate and the old year dismissed though the north gate. The version composed by Benjamin Britten was featured on the soundtrack to the 2024 film Challengers.
