= Emily Smith (singer) =

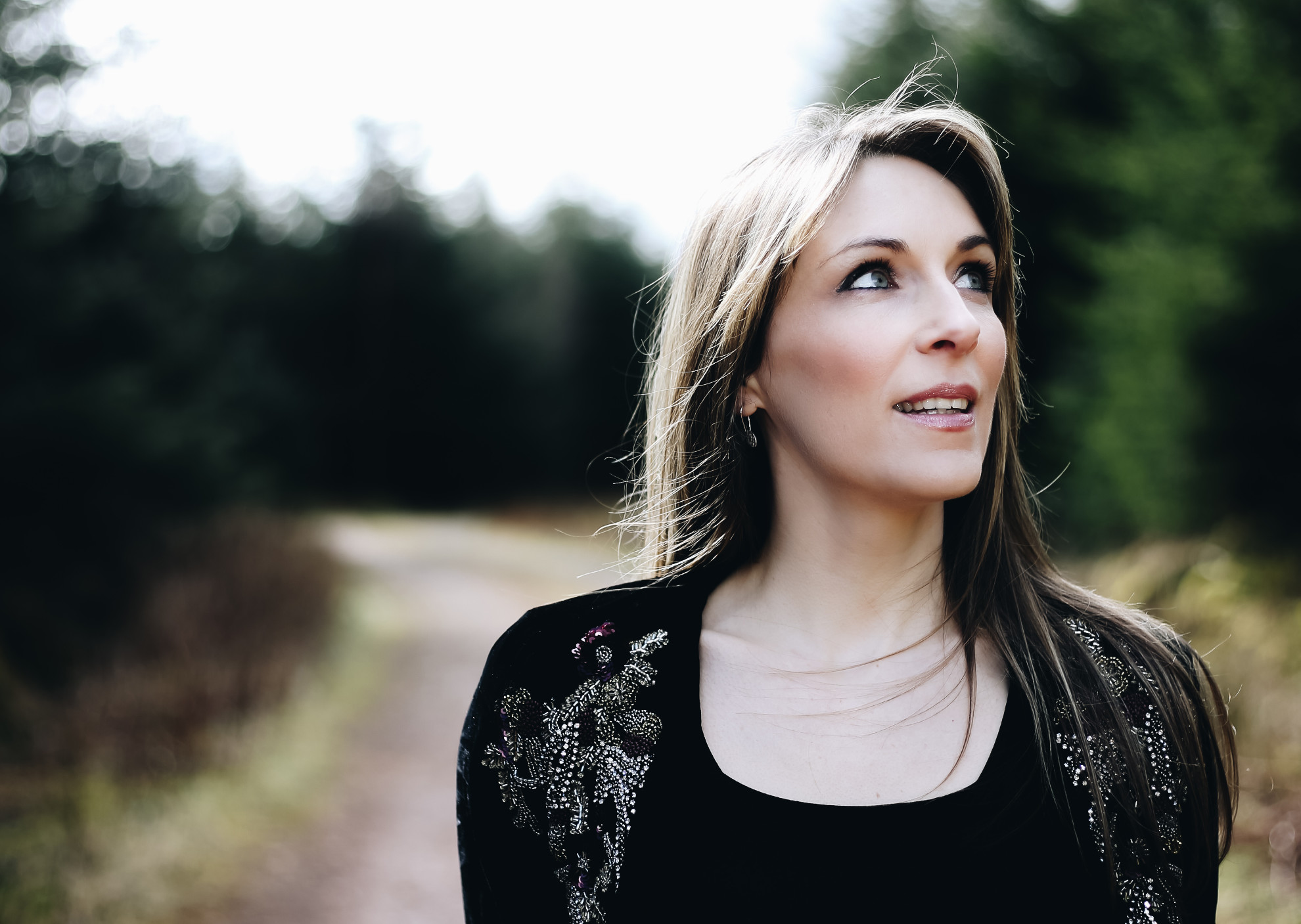
- Smith in 2020

Background information
- Born: 25 March 1981 (age 45)
- Origin: Thornhill, Dumfries and Galloway, Scotland
- Genres: Celtic, folk
- Occupation: Singer
- Instruments: Vocals, piano, accordion
- Years active: 2002–present
- Labels: White Fall Records, Proper Distribution
- Website: emilysmith.org

Emily Smith (born 25 May 1981) is a Scottish folk singer from Dumfries and Galloway. She went to school at Wallace Hall and has a degree in Scottish music from The Royal Scottish Academy of Music and Drama.

== Early life ==
Smith started to learn the piano aged seven, and later moved to piano accordion, where at the age of eighteen she was National Mod champion. She gained an Honours degree in Scottish Music from the Royal Scottish Academy of Music and Drama.

== Discography ==
=== Solo albums ===
- A Day Like Today (2002)
- A Different Life (2005)
- Too Long Away (2008)
- Adoon Winding Nith with Jamie McClennan (2009)
- Traiveller's Joy (2011)
- Ten Years (2013)
- A Winters Night – EP (2014)
- Echoes (2014)
- Songs for Christmas (2016)

=== Collaborations and guest appearances ===
- Faultlines – Karine Polwart (2003)
- Darwin Song Project – Various Artists (March 2009)
- Transatlantic Sessions 4 (October 2009)
- Adoon Winding Nith – with Jamie McClennan (November 2009)
- Sweet Visitor – Nancy Kerr (2014)
- Unplugged – Smith & McClennan (2018)
- Small Town Stories – Smith & McClennan (2020)

== TV appearances ==
Television appearances include:

- BBC Songs of Praise
- Transatlantic Sessions 4
- Scotland's Hogmanay Live (broadcast live from Glasgow)

== Awards ==
- BBC Radio Scotland Young Traditional Musician award (2002)
- Scots Trad Music Awards: Scots Singer of the Year (2008)

== Personal life ==
Smith is married to Jamie McClennan, a New Zealand-born fiddle player and guitarist.
