= James Fagan (musician) =

Australian singer

James Fagan (born 1972) is an Australian folk musician based in England. He is a singer and multi-instrumentalist specialising in the Irish bouzouki. From the early 1980s he toured in a family band, the Fagans. He began travelling to England in 1995, where he met and began working with English folk musician, Nancy Kerr. The couple married in 2007 in Bath, Somerset.

== Biography ==
Born in Canberra in 1972, James Fagan was the first child of local folk singers Bob and Margaret Fagan. Bob and Margaret, James and his sister Kate formed the Fagans, who have toured the Australian folk scene since the early 1980s. Fagan's first instrument was piano. By his teens, he was singing, playing guitar, and playing the clarinet. In 1994, he joined Alistair Hulett's backing band, the Hooligans, which included Jimmy Gregory. Gregory introduced Fagan to the guitar-shaped, Irish bouzouki which is now his main instrument. Singing remains his first and foremost musical love.

He completed his medical training in 1995 and was on holiday in England when he met Nancy Kerr. They formed a duo which has become the mainstay of their career.

Fagan is best known for his work with Kerr whom he married in 2007, and with whom he won BBC Radio 2 Folk Awards 'Best Duo' in both 2003 and 2011. Together they have released seven albums: Starry Gazy Pie (1997), Scalene (with Sandra Kerr) (1998), Steely Water (1999), Between The Dark and Light (2002), Strands of Gold (2006), Twice Reflected Sun (2010), and An Evening with Nancy Kerr and James Fagan - LIVE (2019).

In 2008, Kerr and Fagan were joined by concertina player Robert Harbron to form the trio "Kerr Fagan Harbron", recording and touring the album Station House. In 2010 Kerr and Fagan formed the Melrose Quartet with Sheffield duo Richard and Jess Arrowsmith. Melrose Quartet was nominated for Best Group at the BBC Radio 2 Folk Awards 2014.

Fagan is part of his wife Nancy Kerr's Sweet Visitor Band, playing on the CDs Sweet Visitor (2014) and Instar (2016).

Fagan is well respected in his own right on the UK music scene – his other projects include being a member of The Cara Dillon Band, Melrose Quartet (with Nancy Kerr, Richard Arrowsmith and Jess Arrowsmith) and heavy metal English Ceilidh band The Glorystrokes. He has also toured as part of Bellowhead. Fagan also works in a duo called The James Brothers, with Jamie McClennan, the New Zealand fiddle player and partner of Scottish folk singer Emily Smith.

Since 2014 Fagan has been a regular presenter on his local community radio station Sheffield Live hosting the two hour Friday morning folk show Thank Goodness It's Folk.

== Selected discography ==
- Heat, Light and Sound (1996) – with Eliza Carthy
- Starry Gazy Pie (1997) – with Nancy Kerr
- Scalene (1998) – with Sandra Kerr
- Steely Water (1999) – with Nancy Kerr
- Between The Dark and Light (2002) – with Nancy Kerr
- Turning Fine (2004) – with The Fagans
- Strands of Gold (2006) – with Nancy Kerr
- Station House (2008) – with Nancy Kerr and Robert Harbron
- Milk and Honey Land (2009) – with The Fagans
- Twice Reflected Sun (2010) – with Nancy Kerr
- Fifty Verses (2013) – with Melrose Quartet
- Sweet Visitor (2014) – with Nancy Kerr
- The James Brothers (2015) – with Jamie McClennan
- Instar (2016) (LiDiCD002) - with Nancy Kerr
- Dominion (2017) (with Melrose Quartet) (MQCD03)
- An Evening With Nancy Kerr & James Fagan (2019) (LiDiCD003)
