= Holy Heathens and the Old Green Man =

Studio album by Waterson:Carthy
- Released: October 30, 2006
- Length: 59:47
- Label: Topic Records
- Producer: Oliver Knight, Tony Engle

Waterson:Carthy chronology
The Definitive Collection (2005)	Holy Heathens and the Old Green Man (2006)

Holy Heathens and the Old Green Man is a 2006 album by English folk group Waterson:Carthy, also featuring the vocal group The Devil's Interval, released on Topic Records. It is a collection of seasonal songs, most having a Christian flavour ("Diadem" is unique in that it has phrases which suggest that the figure being adored is a Green Man rather than Christ). They have mostly avoided familiar carols, and even where the words as well-known, they have selected unfamiliar tunes. There is more instrumental accompaniment on this collection than on any previous Waterson:Carthy album, notably containing brass arrangements influenced by Martin Carthy's work in the band Brass Monkey.

== Track listing ==
1. "New Year Carol – Residue" (Traditional) (2:57)
  The meaning of the title "Residue" is unknown: the traditional song is titled "Levy-Dew", and this variant may be a mondegreen .
2. "Sugar Wassail" (Traditional, Roud 209) (2:12)
  From the collection of Rev. John Broadwood.
3. "St George" (John Kirkpatrick) (2:50)
  Kirkpatrick's song is similar to words in the Mummer's Play.
4. "May Song" (Traditional, Roud 305) (2:44)
  From Fred Hamer's collection, combining the "Night Song" and the "Day Song" into one.
5. "Christ Made a Trance" (Traditional, Roud 2112) (2:32)
  A grim Passiontide vision of Christ's pain.
6. "When Jesus Wept The Falling Tear" (W Billings) (2:24)
  Sung as a round. Originally written by William Billings (1746 - 1800, Boston), commonly regarded as the first American choral composer.
7. "Cherry Tree Carol" (Traditional, Roud 453, Child 54) (4:20)
  A song for Epiphany.
8. "Reaphook and Sickle" (Traditional, Roud 1375) (2:48)
  A song for the end of harvest.
9. "Jack Frost" (Mike Waterson) (4:33)
  A description of a frosty scene
10. "While Shepherds Watched Their Flocks" (Words: Nahum Tate / Tune: Traditional, Roud 936) (5:17)
  Sung to one of the many traditional tunes found in Yorkshire - this version was collected from the singing of Walter Pardon.
11. "On Christmas Day It Happened So" (Traditional, Roud 1078) (2:43)
  From Hamer's "Garners Gay". A ploughman is punished for ploughing on Christmas Day.
12. "Time to Remember the Poor" (Words: John Fielding / Tune: H. T. Dyring, Roud 1121) (4:40)
  A poetic plea for charity.
13. "Jacobstowe Wassail" (Traditional, Roud 209) (2:50)
  A Wassail song from the Devon village of Jacobstowe, from the Baring-Gould collection.
14. "Awake Awake (New Years Carol)" (Traditional, Roud 701) (4:06)
  Not the same song as the one by Steeleye Span.
15. "Diadem" (Traditional, Roud 17726) (3:28)
  A song from Yorkshire where Christ is portrayed as a king.
16. "Jolly Old Hawk" (Traditional, Roud 1048) (2:51)
  A Somerset carol from The Twelve Days of Christmas family of songs.
17. "Gloryland (Baptist hymn)" (Words: Traditional, Tune: Eliza Carthy) (3:40)
  A flowing, soaring description of heaven.

== Personnel ==
Waterson:Carthy:

- Norma Waterson – vocals, triangle
- Eliza Carthy – vocals, fiddle, mandolin
- Martin Carthy – vocals, guitar
- Tim Van Eyken – vocals, melodeons, brass arrangements

The Devil's Interval:

- Jim Causley – vocals
- Emily Portman – vocals
- Lauren McCormick – vocals

Also with:

- Martin Brinsford – percussion
- Alice Kinloch – trombone and tuba, brass arrangements
- Tom Allan – trumpets, brass arrangements
- Oliver Knight – cello
