= Bandstand Marathon =

- Formation: 2008
- Purpose: Promote community music
- Region served: United Kingdom
- Website: bandstandmarathon.org.uk

The Bandstand Marathon is a cultural event that began in 2008 and sees a range of free live music concerts take place simultaneously at bandstands and other outdoor venues across the United Kingdom. In 2012 the Bandstand Marathon became an official part of the Cultural Olympiad and it was announced in September that it would be the official finale event of the London 2012 Festival. The 2012 Bandstand Marathon was officially endorsed by Coldplay, who allowed participating bands to perform their song "Viva La Vida" simultaneously across the country to tie in with their performance of the song at the closing ceremony of the Paralympic games.

== Background ==
The Bandstand Marathon is organized by Taunton based arts organization Superact. The event sees amateur musicians perform in their local communities at the same time on the same day, and is a celebration of the U.K's diverse musical talent. In 2012, Superact partnered with Making Music to put on the event on a larger scale than had been possible in previous years.

== Past events ==
=== 2008–2011 Marathon ===
The Bandstand Marathon began in 2008 and was awarded the Inspire Mark to indicate it had been inspired by the spirit of the London 2012 Olympic Games. The events varied in size and scope from year to year; 50 events took place in the South West in 2008, 120 events took place in 2009 and 70 occurred in 2010. On 25 September 2011 there were over 150 events across the U.K; 2011 was the first year when events took place in London.

=== 2012 Marathon ===
The 2012 Bandstand Marathon saw events take place at 224 venues across the U.K on 9 September from 1.00pm until 5.00pm. Due to the event's ties with London 2012, one of the events took place at the bandstand in the Olympic Park, London. The event was endorsed by Coldplay, who gave their permission for participating bands to perform their 2008 single "Viva La Vida" simultaneously across the country at 2.00pm.
