= Kate Fagan (poet) =

Australian poet, musician and academic

- Education: University of Sydney
- Occupations: Poet, musician, academic
- Partner: Peter Minter
- Children: 2
- Relatives: James Fagan (brother)

Kate Fagan is an Australian poet, musician and academic.

== Education ==
Fagan attended James Ruse Agricultural High School. She came second in the state in the 1990 New South Wales Higher School Certificate, distinguishing herself in mathematics, modern history, agriculture and English. Initially studying arts/law at university, her academic interests began to focus on literary culture.

She gained her PhD at the University of Sydney with a doctoral thesis on the poetics of Lyn Hejinian.

== Career ==
Fagan is now a lecturer at the University of Western Sydney in poetry. She is a former editor of How2, a US-based online journal of innovative poetry and poetics. She is also a songwriter and performer whose album Diamond Wheel won the National Film & Sound Archive Award for Best Folk Album.

Fagan comes from a family of folk singers and was strongly influenced by traditional ballads. She has said that, whether she writes songs or poems, she feels the same need to create a lyrical work, and that, to her, "lyricism is a heightened awareness of the music of relations between things". She performed with a full band at the 2014 National Folk Festival in Canberra.

She has published numerous poems in journals and has published several collections. It has been said of her poetry that it is characterised by a fractured language which incorporates the variety of everyday experience, and reflects the way the mind uses language to assimilate that experience. Her collection First Light was shortlisted for the Kenneth Slessor Prize for Poetry for 2013.

== Personal life ==
Kate Fagan and her older brother James joined their parents Bob and Margaret Fagan in folk music performances from a young age, performing as the group The Fagans.

Fagan is married to fellow Australian poet Peter Minter and they have two children.

== Selected publications ==
=== Chapters in books ===
- Fagan, K. and Minter, P. (2010), 'Murdering Alphabets, Disorienting Romance: John Tranter and Postmodern Australian Poetics', The Salt Companion to John Tranter, Salt Publishing ISBN 9781876857769.

=== Journal articles ===
- Fagan, K. (2012), 'A fluke? [N]ever!: reading Chris Edwards', Journal of the Association for the Study of Australian Literature
- Fagan, K. (2009), '"Originals of Revisable Originals": Sampling and Composting in the Poetry of Peter Minter, Paul Hardacre and Kate Lilley', Angelaki, 9.

=== Other publications ===
- 2010, 3 Centos: Blackbox Manifold, Vol. 4
- 2010, "The Correspondence": Ekleksographia online journal
- 2011, Selection of poems in Thirty Australian Poets
- 2011, Selection of poems in HEAT magazine
- 2011, 'Poem in Spoken in One Strange Word, anthology of the 2011 Queensland Poetry Festival
- 2010, The Octet Rule
- 2010, ‘Workman, Honeyeater’: published in Poems to Share, an educational kit developed by The Red Room Company
- 2012, ‘Poems by Kate Fagan’ in Fifty-one Contemporary Poets from Australia
- 2012, First Light: described as poetry with an "unerring sense of musical poise"
- 2012, Poems by Kate Fagan
