= Saul Rose =

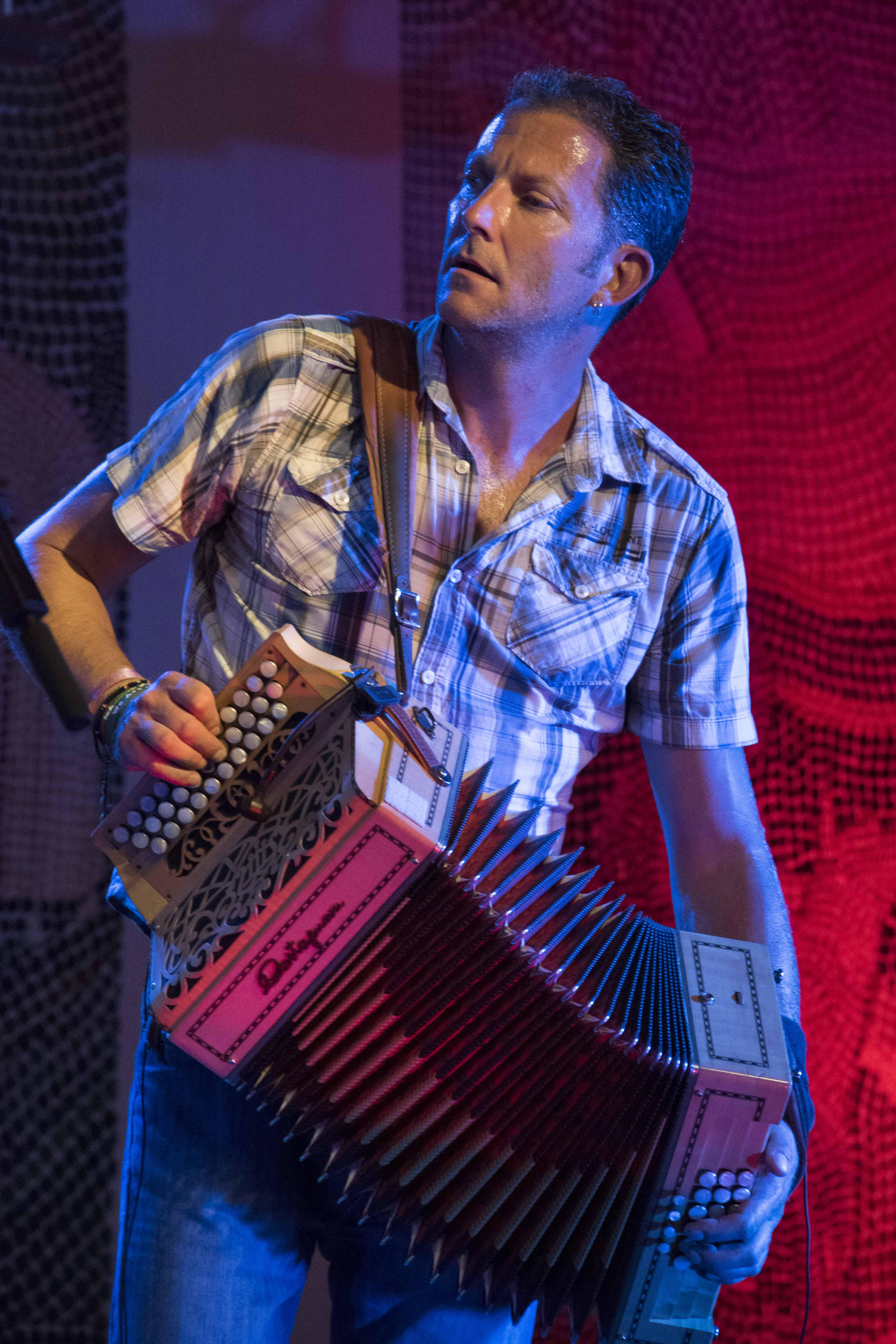

Background information
- Born: 1973 (age 51–52); Harrow, England
- Genres: Folk
- Occupation(s): Singer, instrumentalist
- Instrument: Melodeon
- Website: www.saulrose.co.uk

Saul Rose (born 1973) is an English folk melodeon player and singer.

== Biography ==
Born in Harrow, he first picked up the melodeon after breaking his leg at the age of eleven and was taught his first tunes by his father.

After entering the BBC Radio 2 Young Tradition Award in 1991 (which he didn't win) he gained some exposure. Through that, he was invited to join the ceilidh band Phungus as cover for the main melodeon player Paul Nye who had been unwell. This line-up has evolved into Random which plays folk festivals and has recorded two albums.

In early 1994 he met Eliza Carthy, and with Nancy Kerr, they formed the Kings of Calicutt. Subsequently, he joined Waterson–Carthy. He toured extensively with both bands and eventually formed a successful duo with Eliza Carthy.

With Dan Plews, Rose formed Dansaul. More recently Rose has joined Faustus and Whapweasel, played in Ruth Notman's band, and re-launched his duo with hammered dulcimer player and fellow Kings of Calicutt member Maclaine Colston. In the summer of 2009, he joined Jim Moray's regular band.

In 2009 Rose was nominated for the 2010 BBC Radio 2 Folk Awards in the category Musician of the Year, but lost out to fellow squeezebox player John Kirkpatrick.

In 2011 Rose took the part of the Songman in the West End play War Horse playing and singing as well as some acting roles.

== Discography ==
- Kings of Calicutt: Evolving Tradition 1 (Mrs. Casey)
- Kings of Calicutt: Evolving Tradition 2 (Mrs. Casey)
- Eliza Carthy and Nancy Kerr: Shape of Scrape (Mrs. Casey)
- Waterson–Carthy: Common Tongue (Topic Records)
- Waterson–Carthy: Broken Ground (Topic Records)
- Eliza Carthy and the Kings of Calicutt (Topic Records)
- Dansaul: Foot and Mouth (All our own work)
- Eliza Carthy: Rice (Topic Records)
- Random: Deviation (Wildgoose)
- Laurel Swift: Beam (NECTA Arts)
- Random: Toadstone (Wildgoose)
- Whapweasel: Colour (Whapmusic)
- Faustus: Faustus (Navigator)
- Maclaine Colston and Saul Rose: Sand & Soil (Get Real)
- James Delarre and Saul Rose: Cabin Fever (Infuse)
- Whapweasel: Festivalis (Whapmusic) 2012
- Faustus: Broken Down Gentlemen (Navigator)
- Faustus: Death and Other Animals (West Park Music)
