= Matthew Kaner =

British composer (born 1986)

Matthew Kaner (born 1986) is a British composer. His work has been performed by various orchestras and ensembles including the BBC Singers, the Orchestra of the Age of Enlightenment, the London Symphony Orchestra and the London Sinfonietta at music venues such as the Barbican, the Royal Festival Hall, the Purcell Room, LSO St. Luke’s, the Seiji Ozawa Hall, Wigmore Hall, St. John’s Smith Square and Snape Maltings.

In 2016, he was the BBC Radio 3 embedded composer in residence for its 70th anniversary in which he composed 14 pieces which were repeatedly broadcast on the station.

== Education ==
Kaner studied at King's College London before pursuing postgraduate studies at the Guildhall School of Music and Drama under Julian Anderson, where he now works as a professor of composition.

== Career ==
In 2012, Kaner was the Margaret Lee Crofts Fellow in composition at Tanglewood where he had the opportunity to work with composers like George Benjamin, Oliver Knussen and Michael Gandolfi. In the following year, he received the Royal Philharmonic Society composition prize. Kaner was commissioned afterwards to write for the Philharmonia Music of Today series which was premiered by members of the Philharmonia in the Royal Festival Hall in 2014. During his time as composer-in-association with the Workers' Union, he wrote the piece Organum as part of the Performing Rights Society (PRS) Music Foundation's Constructing a Repertoire project.

In 2022, as part of the BBC Proms, Matthew wrote Pearl, for the BBC Symphony Orchestra, Chorus, and baritone Roderick Williams.

Since 2013, Matthew has been a Professor of Composition at the Guildhall School of Music & Drama.

== Works ==
=== Chamber ===
- Piano Trio (2021)
- At Night (2021)
- Flight Studies: The Swift and the Kestrel (2021)
- Glints in the Water (2016)
- Sicilienne (2016)
- Echoes in the Stillness (2016)
- Concerto for Four Baroque Violins (2016)
- The Red-Crowned Crane (2016)
- Fixations (2016)
- Snowbells (2016)
- Dance Suite (2015)
- Chants (2013) – commissioned by the London Sinfonietta as part of Writing the Future, world premiere on 8 December, 13:15 in the Purcell Room
- Calligraphic Study (after Johann Hering) (2012)
- Litanies (2007)

=== Electroacoustic ===
- The Third Programme (2016) – commissioned by BBC Radio 3 to celebrate the final day of 70th Anniversary celebrations and of Kaner's Embedded Composer in 3 residency, first broadcast from Goonhilly Earth Station live on In Tune on 7 December 2016

=== Ensemble (over six players) ===
- Collide (2016)
- Mosaic (2014) – commissioned by the Royal Philharmonic Society, premiere given by the players of the Philharmonia Orchestra in the Royal Festival Hall on 31 May 2014, conducted by Clark Rundell
- Organum (2013) – commissioned by the Workers' Union with the support of the PRS for Music Foundation, world premiere given on 28 October 2013 in the Turner Sims Concert Hall, Southampton, followed by the London premiere at LSO St. Luke's on 9 November 2013
- Fantastical Fragments (2011–12)
- Gauguin Sketches (2011)
- Octet (2009)

=== Orchestral ===
- Encounters (2015–17)
- The Calligrapher's Manuscript (2012–13) – commissioned for the London Symphony Orchestra through the LSO Discovery Panufnik Young Composers scheme, supported by the Helen Hamyln trust
- Stranded (2017)

=== Stage works ===
- Hansel and Gretel: A Nightmare in Eight Scenes (2018) – poetry by Simon Armitage, commissioned by Goldfield Productions, supported by Arts Council England, PRS Foundation, Foyle Foundation, Radcliffe Trust, RVW Trust, Double O Foundation, Leche Trust, Colwinston Trust, John S Cohen Foundation, premiere date 7 July 2018, at Cheltenham Music Festival

=== Video ===
- Via (2014) – with Luke Burton

=== Voice(s) ===
- Reframe – 2016
- Contemplations – 2016
- Duo Seraphim – 2015
- O Adonai (O Antiphons no. 2) – 2014
