= Martin Winsor =

Martin Winsor (6 December 1931 – 4 August 1992) was an English folk singer. He was a member of the British folk revival. He co-managed The Troubadour folk club in London.
