= Maz O'Connor =

English folk singer

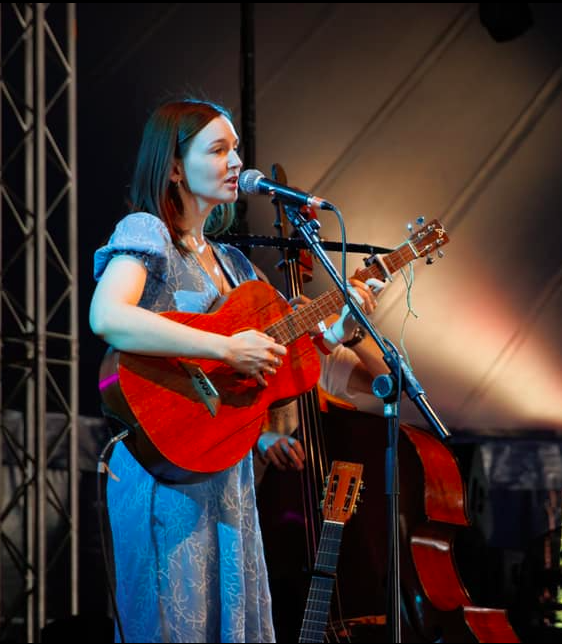
Maz O'Connor performing at the Wickham Folk Festival, August 2022

Maz O'Connor is an English folk singer, songwriter and composer from Barrow-in-Furness, Cumbria. She has released six albums and has written book, music and lyrics for the folk musical, 'The Wife of Michael Cleary', which won the 2023-24 Stiles + Drewe Mentorship Award for new musicals.

== Career ==
O'Connor grew up singing traditional folk songs at parties and folk clubs. In 2009, she was a finalist in the BBC Young Folk Award. From 2009-2011, O'Connor sang with the band Last Orders, including appearances at Cropredy and the Cambridge Folk Festival. O'Connor studied literature at Jesus College, Cambridge.

In 2012, she released her first album, "Upon A Stranger Shore" (Demon Barber Sounds, DBS 005), followed in 2014 by 'This Willowed Light' which was nominated for the Horizon Award at the BBC Radio 2 Folk Awards. She has since released four further albums and her music has been played on BBC Radio 2, BBC Radio 1, BBC Radio 3 and BBC 6 Music. Her songwriting has been praised for its innovation and individuality, while her voice has been compared to Joni Mitchell's. She cites Joni Mitchell and Nina Simone as two of her major influences as well as folk songs, folklore, literature and mythology.

In 2022, she was a winner of the Drake YolanDa Prize, judged by YolanDa Brown.

As a composer, she has been commissioned by The Royal Shakespeare Company, UK Houses of Parliament, and BBC Radio 4.

'The Wife of Michael Cleary' is her first musical, for which she has written book, music and lyrics. It is based on the true story of Bridget Cleary. The first public workshop of the piece was performed at The Other Palace, London, in October 2024 starring Faoileann Cunningham, Connor Byrne and Ciarán Owens.

In 2026, O'Connor released her sixth album, 'Love It Is A Killing Thing', a collection of centuries-old folk songs about the perils of love, reimagined, in some cases re-composed, and recorded live to tape.
