= Simon Drew =

British artist (born 1952)

Simon Drew (born 9 October 1952) is a British illustrator and cartoonist, noted for his quirky punning captions, often featuring animals, which he draws in a fine pen-and-ink style.

== Biography ==
Drew was born in Reading on 9 October 1952, and was educated at Bradfield College, Berkshire. Drew read Zoology at Exeter University, and trained as a teacher at Reading University before teaching for five years in West Sussex.

In 1981, he established his own gallery in Dartmouth, Devon, for the sale of illustrations, paintings and the work of studio potters which, since 1985, has been short-listed by the British Crafts Council for its high standards. His first book, A Book of Bestial Nonsense, appeared in 1986. He has regularly produced work for Friends of the Earth, including posters and stage designs, one of such pieces displayed a vanishing countryside.

On 12 August 2011, Drew appeared in an episode of Channel 4's Come Dine with Me, during which he won joint first place with two of the three other contestants on the show.

== Politics ==
Drew stood as an independent candidate for Totnes in the 2010 general election. His platform was mostly satirical, in reaction to the expenses scandal. He polled 390 votes, coming second to last of eight candidates.

== Books ==
Drew's publications include:

- A Book of Bestial Nonsense (1986)
- Nonsense in Flight (1987)
- Still Warthogs Run Deep (1988)
- The Puffin's Advice (1989)
- Cat with Piano Tuna (1990)
- Camp David: Nonsense in Art (1992)
- Beastly Address Book for Beastly Friends (1993)
- Handel's Warthog Music: Nonsense in Music (1993)
- A Pig's Ear (1994)
- A Beastly Birthday Book (1995)
- Great Mistakes of Civilisation (1996)
- Bird Dropping (1996)
- Dogsbodies (1997)
- The Duck Stops Here (1998)
- The Very Worst of Simon Drew (1999)
- Illustrations for The New Book of Exeter Riddles (Lawrence Sail and Kevin Crossley-Holland (1999)
- Spot the Book Title (2000)
- Pie Aaaaaarrgh Squared (2001)
- Book of Maritime Nonsense (2002)
- Spot the Author (2003)
- Quotations of Oscar Wilde (2004)
- And So I Face the Vinyl Curtain (2005)
- New Simon Drew Address Book (2006)
- Book of Pointless Verses (2006)
- Shepherd Spy: A Tale of Violence And Intrigue And Terrorist Sheep (2007)
- The Plot Thickens (2008)
- Ludicrous Limericks (2009)
- A is for Aardvark (2010)
- Gin'll Fix It (2011)
- A Birthday Book (2012)
- Golf: Fairway Fables (2013)
- The Wisdom of Wine (2014)
- Fowl, Fleas and Fancy Fauna (2015)
