= Waterson:Carthy =

English folk group

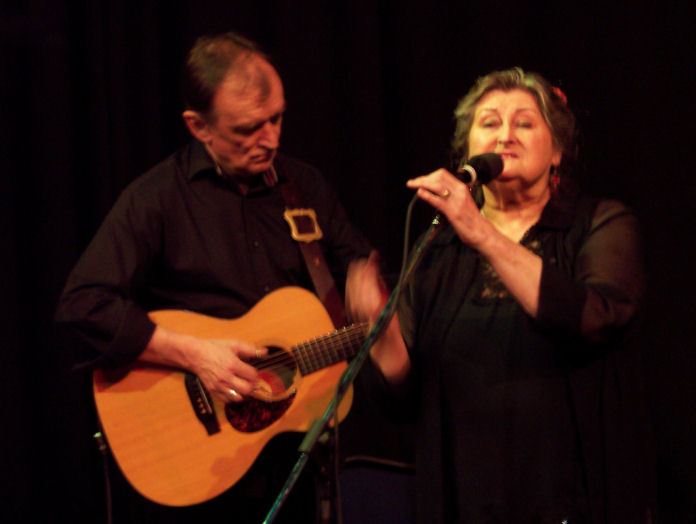
- Martin Carthy and Norma Waterson at a Waterson:Carthy performance in Cranleigh, April 2006.

Background information
- Origin: Robin Hood's Bay/Whitby, England
- Genres: English folk music
- Years active: 1994–2022
- Label: Topic
- Members: Norma Waterson; Martin Carthy; Eliza Carthy; Saul Rose
- Past members: Tim Van Eyken

Waterson:Carthy were an English folk group originally comprising Norma Waterson on vocals, her husband Martin Carthy on guitar and vocals and their daughter Eliza Carthy on fiddle and vocals.

== History ==
The group had a repertoire of predominantly British traditional songs and tunes but also occasionally performed contemporary songs from various sources. Their instrumentation was based largely around Martin Carthy's guitar, Eliza Carthy's fiddle and the melodeons of Saul Rose (1996–2000 and 2007–2022) and Tim Van Eyken (2000–2007), with other instruments regularly augmenting their recordings. The group also continued the strong unaccompanied vocal tradition established by Norma and Martin's previous family group The Watersons, from whom they were widely considered to have evolved.

The group's first album Waterson:Carthy (1994) was performed largely as a trio, with notable contributions from Eliza's musical partner Nancy Kerr. Their second album Common Tongue (1996) featured a more diverse selection of guest musicians with significant contributions from melodeon player Saul Rose. Although at this stage Rose was not credited as a full group member he soon became a permanent member of the touring group and was credited as a full group member on the release of their third album Broken Ground (1999).

Rose left shortly thereafter to take up a career in the pharmaceutical industry and was replaced by Tim van Eyken in 2000. This line-up went on to release the albums A Dark Light (2002) and Fishes & Fine Yellow Sand (2004) and to consolidate the group's reputation as an outstanding live band. Holy Heathens and the Old Green Man (2006), an album of seasonal songs on which they were joined by vocal trio The Devil's Interval (Jim Causley, Lauren McCormick & Emily Portman) was widely considered both a belated follow-up and an addendum to The Watersons' Frost & Fire (1965). The group had already re-established The Watersons' tradition of performing a pre-Christmas tour under the Frost & Fire banner and by December 2006 this had been expanded to include a Mummers Play, brass section and a more significant contribution from The Devil's Interval.

Van Eyken had announced his intention to leave the group to concentrate on his solo career prior to the December 2006 tour and his eventual final show was a Waterson Family special performance on 12 May 2007 London's Royal Albert Hall. Saul Rose, having again taken up music full-time in May 2006, immediately rejoined and the group began touring again in June 2007.

All four members of Waterson:Carthy continued to conduct successful careers outside the group. Norma Waterson released several solo albums and performed in an occasional duo with Martin Carthy. Martin Carthy was a member of Brass Monkey, performed in occasional duos with Dave Swarbrick (until Swarbrick's death in 2016 – they last toured together in 2015), John Kirkpatrick and Eliza Carthy, and had a successful solo career stretching back over more than 50 years. Eliza Carthy has a successful solo career and has performed in an occasional duo with Saul Rose. Saul has performed with various ensembles including Faustus, Random, Morris Offspring and Dansaul. Martin, Norma and Eliza all occasionally performed with Blue Murder.

Individually, Martin, Norma and Eliza won or were nominated several times in the BBC Radio 2 Folk Awards, and Waterson:Carthy won awards for Best Group and Best Traditional Track (Raggle Taggle Gypsy) in 2000.

Norma died on 30 January 2022, at the age of 82.

== Discography ==
- Waterson:Carthy (1994)
- Common Tongue (1996)
- Broken Ground (1999)
- A Dark Light (2002)
- The Watersons: Mighty River of Song (2004) Several previously unreleased Waterson:Carthy tracks appear on this 4-CD box set
- Fishes And Fine Yellow Sand (2004)
- Holy Heathens and the Old Green Man (2006)
- The Definitive Collection (compilation 2005)

== DVD ==
- In Search of English Folk Song (1997 BBC film directed by Ken Russell)

Fairport Convention, Donovan, Osibisa, Eliza Carthy, The Albion Band, Waterson:Carthy, Edward II.
Reissued on DVD in 2008, but for Region 1 only
