= Tim Van Eyken =

Tim van Eyken
- Born: 7 March 1978 (age 48)
- Origin: England
- Occupation: Musician
- Instruments: Guitar, melodeon
- Years active: 1998–present
- Website: www.timvaneyken.co.uk

Tim van Eyken (born 7 March 1978) is an English actor, singer, melodeon player and guitarist.

== Career ==
Van Eyken first started playing penny whistle after seeing James Galway on television. He graduated to playing for his mother, then a member of the Beetlecrushers clog dance team. There was pressure from the team to play something louder, so he learned the melodeon. He first came to prominence in 1998 when he won the BBC Radio 2 Young Folk Award. In 2000 he was invited to become the fourth member of Waterson–Carthy, a position he held until May 2007. He has his own band, Van Eyken, consisting of Nancy Kerr on fiddle, Olly Knight (Lal Waterson's son) on electric guitar, Colin Fletcher on double bass, and Pete Flood on percussion. Their version of the traditional English song "John Barleycorn" - "Barleycorn" - won the award for Best Traditional Track at the 2007 BBC Radio 2 Folk Awards.

He was a member of the now-defunct group Dr Faustus, together with Robert Harbron, Benji Kirkpatrick, and Paul Sartin. In 2008 he appeared at the National theatre in War Horse by Michael Morpurgo.

== Discography ==
Solo albums

- New Boots (1998)
- Stiffs Lovers Holymen Thieves (2006)

In 2009 John Barleycorn from Stiffs Lovers Holymen Thieves was included in Topic Records 70 year anniversary boxed set Three Score and Ten as track four on the seventh CD.

Tim van Eyken and Robert Harbron

- One Sunday Afternoon (2001)

As a member of Waterson–Carthy

- Fishes & Fine Yellow Sand (2004)
- Holy Heathens and the Old Green Man (2006)

As a member of Dr Faustus

- The First Cut (2003)
- Wager (2005)

As a member of the War Horse Company - Songman

- War Horse CD - Release mid September 08 (2008)
