= Nancy Kerr =

English folk musician

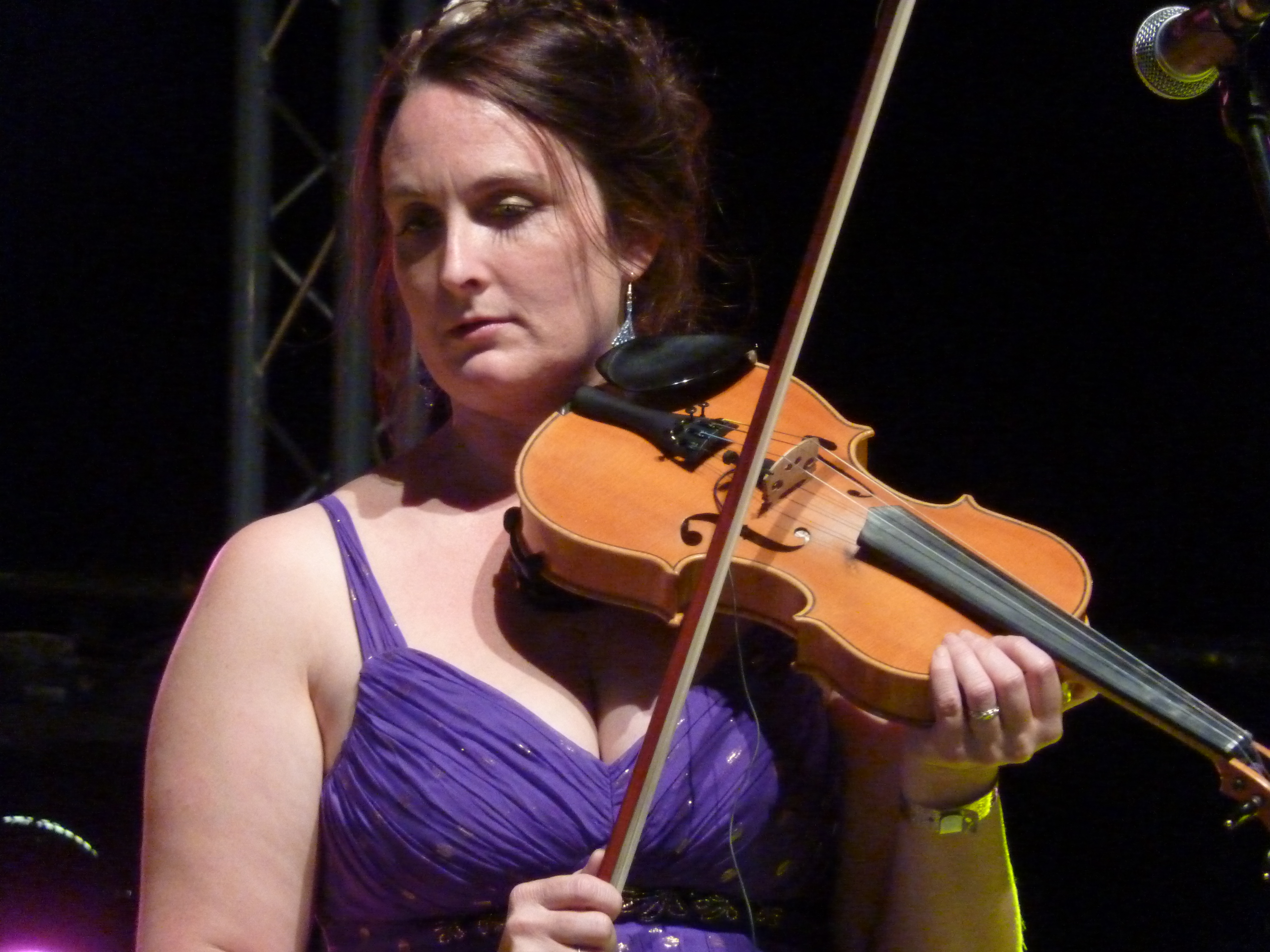
- Kerr on stage at the 2010 Shrewsbury Folk Festival

Background information
- Born: 1975 (age 50–51); London, England
- Genre: English folk music
- Occupations: Singer-songwriter; Multi-instrumentalist
- Instruments: Vocals, fiddle, viola, cello, guitar, harmonium, autoharp
- Years active: 1990s–present
- Label: Little Dish Records
- Website: nancykerr.co.uk

Nancy Kerr (/kɜːr/; born 1975) is an English folk musician and songwriter, specialising in the fiddle and singing—a pioneer in a style of music called fiddle-singing. She is a Principal Lecturer in Folk Music at Newcastle University. She was the 2015 BBC Radio 2 Folk Awards "Folk Singer of the Year".

Born in London, she now lives in Sheffield.

== Early life ==
Kerr is the daughter of London-born singer-songwriter Sandra Kerr and Northumbrian piper Ron Elliott.

== Career ==
Kerr came to prominence in the early 1990s via a musical partnership with fellow fiddle player Eliza Carthy. The duo produced two albums – Eliza Carthy & Nancy Kerr (1993) and Shape of Scrape (1995) – before ceasing to work together. A retrospective collection of their work (plus three previously unreleased tracks) – On Reflection – was released in 2002.

Kerr and her mother released an album together – Neat and Complete – in 1996.

Since 1995, Kerr has worked extensively with Australian bouzouki player and singer James Fagan, whom she married in 2007. The duo won the Horizon Award at the inaugural BBC Radio 2 Folk Awards in 2000, and Best Duo at the same awards in both 2003 and 2011. Between 1997 and 2008 they released six albums on the Fellside label – Starry Gazy Pie, Scalene (with Sandra Kerr), Steely Water, Between The Dark and Light, Strands of Gold and Station House (with Robert Harbron). The album Station House was the result of a collaboration with concertina player Robert Harbron to form the trio Kerr Fagan Harbron. In 2010 Kerr and Fagan produced their first completely original collection of songs – Twice Reflected Sun. The first track of the album, Queen of Waters, was nominated for the "Best Original Song" category at the BBC Radio 2 Folk Awards in 2011.

Kerr has also worked with a number of groups, including folk/pop group Epona, Australian folk family band The Fagans and the Tim van Eyken band. In 2010 she joined James Fagan, Richard Arrowsmith and Jess Arrowsmith to form Melrose Quartet in her new home city of Sheffield. They released a live EP in 2011 called Live at Cheltenham and two studio albums: Fifty Verses in 2013 and Dominion in 2017. She has also performed in the trio Simpson Cutting Kerr, with Martin Simpson and Andy Cutting, whose debut CD Murmurs was released on Topic Records on 8 June 2015.

Kerr has been involved in several commissioned works. In 2013 she was part of Fay Hield's The Full English band to promote the on-line publication of the folk collections of the Vaughan Williams Memorial Library in Cecil Sharp House. The collective won "Best Group" at the 2014 BBC Radio 2 Folk Awards and their CD The Full English won "Best Album" at the same ceremony. In 2014 Kerr was a key songwriter in The Elizabethan Session, a concert, CD and film commissioned by Folk by the Oak and The English Folk Dance and Song Society creating new music about the Elizabethan era. In November 2015, Kerr was one of four songwriters commissioned by Folk by the Oak and The English Folk Dance and Song Society to write and tour a production called Sweet Liberties looking at the history of British parliament and democracy. Their CD Sweet Liberties was released in 2016. In 2017 and 2018 Kerr was one of five musicians who formed Shake the Chains, a project that explored "the role songs have played in social change, resistance and protest". The project was commissioned by Folk by the Oak and supported by Arts Council England, Help Musicians and Folk Alliance. The group toured in 2017 and 2018, and made a live album in 2017.

In 2014, Kerr released Sweet Visitor, her first CD of original songs under her own name, on her own label Little Dish Records. The album's release on 21 July 2014 was followed by a UK tour with The Sweet Visitor Band (James Fagan, Rowan Rheingans, Tom Wright and Tim Yates) in November. James Fagan now shares his role in the band with Greg Russell. 2016 saw the production of Kerr's second album of original songs with The Sweet Visitor Band on Little Dish Records. The album, entitled Instar, was produced by Tom Wright and was released on 16 September 2016.

In 2017 and 2018, Kerr played the Mother in a production of Peter Bellamy's folk opera The Transports.

Having previously been a Principal Lecturer and Voice & Fiddle Tutor at Leeds Conservatoire, becoming an honorary Professor there, Nancy is Principal Lecturer in Folk Music at Newcastle University. She is a co-investigator in the national research project "Music, Heritage, Place" which is uncovering and cataloguing English musical heritage from 1550 to 1850 held in local archives across the country, and is led by Royal Holloway, University of London.

In May 2020, Nancy Kerr recorded 31 new arrangements of songs by Leon Rosselson as a series of videos published on her YouTube channel Nancy Kerr Music. In December 2021, she released a full length album of Leon Rosselson songs entitled "The Poor Shall Wear The Crown".

== Awards ==
- 2000: "Horizon Award" at the BBC Radio 2 Folk Awards.
- 2003: "Best Duo" (with James Fagan) at the BBC Radio 2 Folk Awards.
- 2011: "Best Duo" (with James Fagan) at the BBC Radio 2 Folk Awards.
- 2011: "Best Album" (with James Fagan) in the Spiral Awards
- 2014: "Best Group" and "Best Album" (with the Full English) at the BBC Radio 2 Folk Awards.
- 2015: "Folk Singer of the Year" at the BBC Radio 2 Folk Awards.

== Selected discography ==
- 1993: Eliza Carthy and Nancy Kerr (with Eliza Carthy) (Mrs Casey Records MCRCD3991)
- 1994: Waterson:Carthy (with Waterson–Carthy) (Topic Records TSCD475)
- 1995: Shape of Scrape (with Eliza Carthy) (Mrs Casey Records MCRCD5992)
- 1995: Evolving Tradition 1 (with Kings of Calicut)
- 1996: Neat and Complete (with Sandra Kerr) (Fellside Recordings FECD107)
- 1996: Shine Again (with Epona) (Impstone Records IMP468CD)
- 1996: Evolving Tradition 2 (with Kings of Calicut)
- 1997: Starry Gazy Pie (with James Fagan) (Fellside Recordings FECD127)
- 1998: Scalene (with Sandra Kerr) (Fellside Recordings FECD137)
- 1999: Steely Water (with James Fagan) (Fellside Recordings FECD145)
- 2000: Five Little Frogs (with Sandra Kerr, Leon Rosselson, and Kevin Graal) (Playsongs Publications PP06)
- 2000: Five Little Owls (with Sandra Kerr, Leon Rosselson, and Kevin Graal) (Playsongs Publications PP08)
- 2002: Between The Dark and Light (with James Fagan) (Fellside Recordings FECD167)
- 2002: On Reflection (with Eliza Carthy) (Mrs Casey Records MCRCD1003)
- 2004: Evolving Tradition 4: Generations (with Sandra Kerr)
- 2004: Turning Fine (with The Fagans)
- 2005: Kind Letters (with Martin Simpson)
- 2006: Strands of Gold (with James Fagan) (Fellside Recordings FECD199)
- 2006: Stiffs, Lovers, Holymen, Thieves (with Tim van Eyken band)
- 2008: Station House (with James Fagan and Robert Harbron) (Fellside Recordings FECD211)
- 2009: Milk and Honey Land (with The Fagans)
- 2010: Twice Reflected Sun (with James Fagan) (Navigator Records, NAV0041)
- 2011: Melrose Quartet Live at Cheltenham (with Melrose Quartet: Nancy Kerr, James Fagan, Richard and Jess Arrowsmith)
- 2013: Fifty Verses (with Melrose Quartet) (MQCD02)
- 2014: The Elizabethan Session (with Martin Simpson, Jim Moray, Bella Hardy, John Smith, Hannah James, Rachel Newton, Emily Askew)
- 2014: The Full English (with Fay Hield, Martin Simpson, Seth Lakeman, Rob Harbron, Sam Sweeney and Ben Nicholls)
- 2014: Sweet Visitor (LiDiCD001) (Nancy Kerr solo, with The Sweet Visitor Band)
- 2015: It Was Red/Gingerbread (Vinyl EP, LiDiEP002)
- 2015: Murmurs (with Martin Simpson and Andy Cutting)
- 2016: Instar (LiDiCD002) (Nancy Kerr solo, with The Sweet Visitor Band)
- 2016: Sweet Liberties (with Martyn Joseph, Sam Carter and Maz O'Connor)
- 2017: Dominion (with Melrose Quartet) (MQCD03)
- 2017: Shake the Chains (with Findlay Napier, Hannah Martin, Greg Russell and Tim Yates)
- 2018: The Transports (with the cast of The Transports)
- 2019: An Evening With Nancy Kerr & James Fagan (LiDiCD003)
- 2021: The Poor Shall Wear The Crown: Songs of Leon Rosselson (LiDiCD004) (Nancy Kerr solo)
