= Superact =

- Formation: 2006
- Headquarters: Taunton
- Region served: United Kingdom
- Website: http://www.superact.org.uk

Superact is a nonprofit arts organization based in Taunton, Somerset. Formed in 2006, Superact runs a number of community orientated projects focused on art, music and innovation. Superact is responsible for the running of the nationwide project the Bandstand Marathon, which was the main closing event of the London 2012 Festival. Superact is also involved in the running of a number of arts-based projects in the U.K and across Europe, including the NetBox project, PEETA and the IC Music Project.

Superact also developed the Supporting Employability and Personal Effectiveness (SEPE) qualification in partnership with the University of Exeter; the qualification is accredited by Edexcel and is designed to help those who may find accessing traditional routes to employability challenging to build confidence and gain a meaningful qualification.

== Projects ==
=== Bandstand Marathon ===
The Bandstand Marathon is a cultural event that began in 2008 and sees a range of free live music concerts take place simultaneously at bandstands and other outdoor venues across the U.K. In 2012 the Bandstand Marathon became an official part of the Cultural Olympiad and it was announced in September of that year that it would be the official finale event of the London 2012 Festival. The 2012 Bandstand Marathon was officially endorsed by Coldplay, who allowed participating bands to perform their song "Viva La Vida" simultaneously across the country to tie in with their performance of the song at the closing ceremony of the Paralympic games.

=== IC Music ===
The IC Music Project sees musicians from England, France and Belgium participate in a cultural exchange that provides them with opportunities to work and perform across Europe. Superact is responsible for providing the musicians with training that will enable them to deliver training and perform in potentially challenging environments, such as nursing homes and hospitals.

=== PEETA ===
The Personal Effectiveness and Employability Through the Arts (PEETA) project saw partners from across Europe work with prisoners from institutions in seven countries. The project had artists go into prisons and coach inmates on a variety of art forms, with the goal being to help them turn their lives around by developing their confidence, communication and teamwork skills. This project drew upon the SEPE qualification which was developed by Superact in conjunction with the University of Exeter.

=== NetBox ===
NetBox is a community-focused initiative that aims to enrich communities and help make them more self-sufficient. By researching the needs and skills of individuals in towns across Europe (including Wiveliscombe, Somerset), this project will explore how communities can be made more resilient by drawing upon the resources and knowledge of their inhabitants.
