= Rise Up Like the Sun =

Studio album by The Albion Band
- Released: March 1978
- Studio: Olympic Studios
- Genre: British folk rock
- Length: 39:38 (LP) / 52:20 (CD)
- Label: Harvest; Fledg'ling (2003 reissue)
- Producer: Joe Boyd, John Tams

The Albion Band chronology
The Prospect Before Us (1977)	Rise Up Like the Sun (1978)	Lark Rise to Candleford (1980)

Professional ratings
Review scores
Source	Rating
AllMusic	3/5 stars

Rise Up Like the Sun is a British folk rock album released in 1978 by The Albion Band. The album is in part a collaboration between John Tams on vocals and melodeon and Ashley Hutchings on electric bass. This is not the first album on which the two worked together but it remains the most fulfilling for listeners. To build the sound Hutchings brought in two of his former compatriots from Fairport Convention, Dave Mattacks on drums and tambourine and Simon Nicol on vocals and electric and acoustic guitars. In addition another ex-member of Fairport, Richard Thompson, contributed songs and backing vocals. Having assembled the principal contributors and an ambiance that encouraged their friends to drop in, Hutchings gave Tams the freedom to act as the project's musical director. They were joined by Philip Pickett on shawms, bagpipes, curtals and trumpet, Pete Bullock on synthesiser, piano, clarinet, sax, and organ, Michael Gregory on percussion, Ric Sanders on violin and violectra and Graeme Taylor on electric and acoustic guitars. Kate McGarrigle, Julie Covington, Linda Thompson, Pat Donaldson, Martin Carthy, Andy Fairweather-Low and Dave Bristow make guest appearances.

The album was produced by Tams and Joe Boyd, and engineered by Vic Gamm. It was recorded at Olympic Studio No. 1 and mixed at CBS Studios.

== Critical response ==
The reviews for Rise Up Like the Sun were mostly positive, although opinion was divided on some tracks, such as "The Gresford Disaster". For many, though, the outstanding track of the whole album is "Poor Old Horse", building up from a single fiddle over six minutes to a massed choir with high voices (Kate McGarrigle, Julie Covington and Linda Thompson) and gravelly guitars. "Poor Old Horse" was released as a single in 1978 (Harvest: HAR 5156) and named as "Record of the Week" by the BBC Radio 1's Simon Bates, but made no impact on the charts.

In music magazine surveys, Rise Up Like the Sun often appears among the top three English folk-rock albums of all time, alongside Fairport Convention's Liege and Lief and Shirley Collins' No Roses

This was the last album to be produced by this line-up of the Albion Band. John Tams, Michael Gregory and Graeme Taylor remained in the line-up for one more album, Lark Rise to Candleford, and then went on to form Home Service.

Ric Sanders went on to join Fairport Convention and both Nicol and Mattacks returned to the Fairport fold.

Philip Pickett became one of Britain's most respected scholars of medieval music, although in 2015 he was jailed for rape and sexual assault.

== Track listing ==
=== Side 1 ===
1. "Ragged Heroes" - 3:17
2. "Poor Old Horse" - 6:13
3. "Afro Blue" - 3:10
4. "Danse Royale" - 1:40
5. "Ampleforth" - 0:45
6. "Lay Me Low" - 4:43

=== Side 2 ===
1. "Time To Ring Some Changes" - 2:47
2. "House in the Country" - 3:02
3. "The Primrose" - 3:16
4. "Gresford Disaster" - 10:45

=== 2003 CD bonus tracks ===
1. "The Postman's Knock"
2. "Pain and Paradise"
3. "Lay Me Low"
4. "Rainbow Over The Hill"

== Track notes ==
1. "Ragged Heroes" (John Tams): written as a way of announcing that the songs and tunes would be a rallying-call for English folk music. Towards the end, Martin Carthy's counter-melody makes for some very interesting harmonies.
2. "Poor Old Horse" (Traditional sea shanty): usually called "The Dead Horse". The song was sung at the end of the first month on board ship. Sailors would make a horse figure from rags and tar, hoist it to the yard-arm, then cut it loose and let it drift out to sea. The verse about "Sally in the garden" seems to have drifted in from a different unrelated shanty.
3. "Afro Blue/Danse Royale" (Santamaria/Anon medieval): an instrumental track combining Latin-jazz (John Coltrane, 1963) on violin, with a medieval French dance tune on bagpipes. Only the folk-rock band Gryphon had ever attempted anything like this before.
4. "Ampleforth/Lay Me Low" (Trad/Trad): a Northern English sword dance tune, slowed down and played as an air; followed by a Shaker gift song received by Addah Z. Potter of the New Lebanon Church order on 15 April 1838.
5. "Time To Ring Some Changes": Richard Thompson did not record his song until "Small Town Romance" (1984). Although he was present for the recording of "Poor Old Horse", he does not appear on this track.
6. "House in the Country" (Stewart): Maggie Stewart, one of the travelling Stewarts of Blairgowrie, wrote this song about the difficulty of finding a place to live after the First World War.
7. "The Primrose": a nineteenth century polka which had been recorded by Jimmy Shand in the 1950s, while a recording of the tune by Dartmoor melodeon-player Bob Cann appeared on the Topic Records LP "West Country Melodeon" in 1975.
8. "Gresford Disaster": on 22 September 1934 265 colliers died at the Gresford Colliery in North Wales. A. L. Lloyd included a version of the song from Yorkshire in his book "Come All Ye Bold Miners" (1952), while Alan Lomax made a field recording of the song from Mrs. Cosgrove of Newtongrange, Midlothian, Scotland in the 1950s. The Albion Band set the words to the hymn tune "How Sweet the Name of Jesus Sounds in a Believer's Ear".
9. "The Postman's Knock": a traditional song associated with the Morris dancing tradition at Adderbury in Oxfordshire. The song had previously appeared on Son of Morris On and the Albion Band recorded it again on the album Lark Rise To Candleford (1980).
10. "Pain and Paradise": written by John Tams, inspired by another sea shanty, "Riding on a Donkey."
11. "Lay Me Low": a different sound mix of track 4.
12. "Rainbow Over The Hill": this Richard Thompson song was recorded in 1978 but not released until 1992. Linda Thompson sings the lead.

Note: tracks 9 to 12 are bonus tracks that were not on the original vinyl, but were included on the Harvest/EMI cd and the re-mastered Fledg'ling Records issue of the album, in 2003.

== Personnel ==
- Pete Bullock – synthesizer, piano, organ, saxophone, clarinet
- Michael Gregory – drums, nakers, tambourine
- Ashley Hutchings – electric bass
- Dave Mattacks – drums, tambourine
- Simon Nicol – guitar, vocals
- Philip Pickett – bagpipes, shawms, curtals, trumpet
- Ric Sanders – violin, violectra
- John Tams – lead vocals, melodeon
- Graeme Taylor – guitar

=== Guests ===
- Dave Bristow – synthesizer (3)
- Martin Carthy – vocals (1, 2, 5, 8)
- Julie Covington – vocals (2, 4)
- Pat Donaldson – vocals (2, 4)
- Andy Fairweather-Low – vocals (1, 2, 5)
- Kate McGarrigle – vocals (2, 4), lead vocals (6)
- Linda Thompson – vocals (2, 4), lead vocals (12)
- Richard Thompson – vocals (2, 4)
- Viola Wills – vocals (10)
