= The Prospect Before Us =

Studio album by The Albion Dance Band
- Released: February 1977
- Recorded: Sound Techniques and Olympic
- Genre: Folk, British folk rock
- Length: 40:21
- Label: EMI Harvest
- Producer: Ashley Hutchings, Simon Nicol

The Albion Dance Band chronology
Battle of the Field (1976)	The Prospect Before Us (1977)	Rise Up Like the Sun (1978)

Professional ratings
Review scores
Source	Rating
AllMusic	4.5/5 stars

The Prospect Before Us is a British folk rock album, by The Albion Dance Band, which was released in 1977 on the EMI Harvest label.

The album was produced by Ashley Hutchings and Simon Nicol and was engineered by Vic Gamm. It was recorded at Sound Techniques Studio and Olympic (including live dances at Olympic), London. There are several instrumental tracks. The album cover was designed by Dave Dragon, based on an idea by Pete Scowther.

== Track listing ==
=== Side 1 ===
1. "Uncle Berhard's"/"Jenny Lind" (instrumental) – 3:44
2. "The Hunt Is Up" – 1:51
3. "Varsoviana" (instrumental) – 2:42
4. "Masque" (instrumental) – 1:00
5. "Huntsman's Chorus" – 4:25
6. "Minuet" (instrumental) – 2:05
7. "Wassail Song" – 2:11
8. "Picking of Sticks"/ "The Old Mole" (instrumental) – 3:39

=== Side 2 ===
1. "Merry Sherwood Rangers" (live version) – 3:18
2. "La Sexte Estampie Real" (instrumental) – 1:51
3. "I Wish I was Single Again" – 3:42
4. "The Whim" (instrumental) – 3:29
5. "Hopping Down in Kent" (Roud 1715) – 2:44
6. "Horse's Brawl" (instrumental) – 3:40

== 1993 CD bonus tracks ==
1. "On Christmas Night All Christians Sing" (The Sussex Carol)
2. "Merry Sherwood Rangers" (studio version)

== Personnel ==
- Simon Nicol – electric and acoustic guitars, piano
- Michael Gregory – drums, nakers, percussion
- Philip Pickett – curtals, shawms, recorders, crumhorns, bagpipes, racketts, chalumeaux, synthesizer
- John Sothcott, – vielle, citole, crumhorn
- Graeme Taylor – electric guitar, piano
- Ashley Hutchings – leader, electric bass guitar, vocals
- Shirley Collins – vocals
- Eddie Upton – caller, vocals
- John Tams – vocals, melodeon
- John Rodd – concertina, tambourine, vocals
- Dave Mattacks – drums, piano, electric piano
