= Etchingham Steam Band =

- Origin: England
- Genre: Acoustic folk
- Years active: 1974–1975

The Etchingham Steam Band were a folk group formed by Ashley Hutchings and Shirley Collins in England in 1974 after the Albion Country Band had disbanded in late 1973.

They were named after the village of Etchingham in Sussex where Hutchings and Shirley Collins, his then wife, were living. The band's name was a reference to their acoustic nature, formed during a time of power cuts in the mid-1970s that caused problems for any band using electrical instruments or amplification.

== History ==
In 1973 Ashley Hutchings produced Shirley Collins' Adieu To Old England album. On this album, several musicians appeared who became members of the Etchingham Steam Band the next year. Mouth organist Terry Potter accompanied Collins on The Chiner's Song; both Terry Potter and accordionist Ian Holder also performed the instrumental dance tune Portsmouth on this album.

The complete five-piece lineup of the Etchingham Steam Band toured Europe in 1974 and 1975, including gigs at Lewes Folk Festival, Norwich Folk Festival, the Swiss Lenzburg Folk Festival and in the Netherlands. Guest performers were former Fairport Convention musicians Dave Mattacks and Simon Nicol, then Steeleye Span member Peter Knight, dance caller Eddie Upton and concertina players Will Duke and Mel Dean. The band dissolved in late 1975 when Hutchings formed the Albion Dance Band.

Two medleys including dance tunes and harvest-home toasts, Sheep-Shearing/Buttered Peas and Mistress's Health/Lumps Of Plum Pudding/Sherborne Jig/Spaniard's Cry, were recorded in 1974 in Sound Techniques Studios, London. The studio recording of Mistress's Health/Lumps Of Plum Pudding/Sherborne Jig/Spaniard's Cry was released on Shirley Collins' 1974 compilation LP A Favourite Garland. However, the band never released a complete album during its existence. Various recordings, mostly audience recording of live concerts, were compiled and released on CD in 1995 by Fledg'ling Records; this CD also includes the studio recording of Sheep-Shearing/Buttered Peas.

== Line-up ==
- Ashley Hutchings – acoustic bass guitar, vocals, tambourine
- Shirley Collins – vocals, hobby horse
- Ian Holder – accordion
- Vic Gammon – vocals, concertina, melodeon, banjo
- Terry Potter – mouth organ

== Documented repertoire ==
- Adderbury Wassail Song
- Atholl Highlanders
- Black Joker
- Bonny Kate
- Buttered Peas
- Coast of High Barbaree
- Come All You Little Streamers
- The Devil And The Farmer
- Fair Maid Of Islington (The London Vintner Overreached)
- Gaol Song
- Grandfather's Dance
- Grandmother's Dance
- Greensleeves
- Hard Times Of Old England
- Horn Fair
- Jovial Tinker
- Leapfrog
- The Little Gipsy Girl (The Gipsy's Wedding Day)
- Lumps of Plum Pudding
- Mistress's Health
- The New Rigged Ship
- Orange in Bloom
- Sheep-Shearing
- Shepherd O Shepherd
- Sherborne Jig
- Shooting
- Some Tyrant Has Stolen My True Love Away
- Spaniards Cry
- Sussex Carol
- Up To The Rigs Of London Town
- We Poor Labouring Men
- Young Collins

== Discography ==
- The Etchingham Steam Band (recorded 1974–1975, published in 1995 by Fledg'ling Records)
