= Susan Harris (disambiguation) =

Susan Harris is an American television producer.

Susan Harris may also refer to:

- Susan Harris, a fictional character from the movie Invasion of the Bee Girls
- Susan Harris, a fictional character from the movie Demon Seed, played by Julie Christie
- Sue Harris, English folk musician
