= Kellie While =

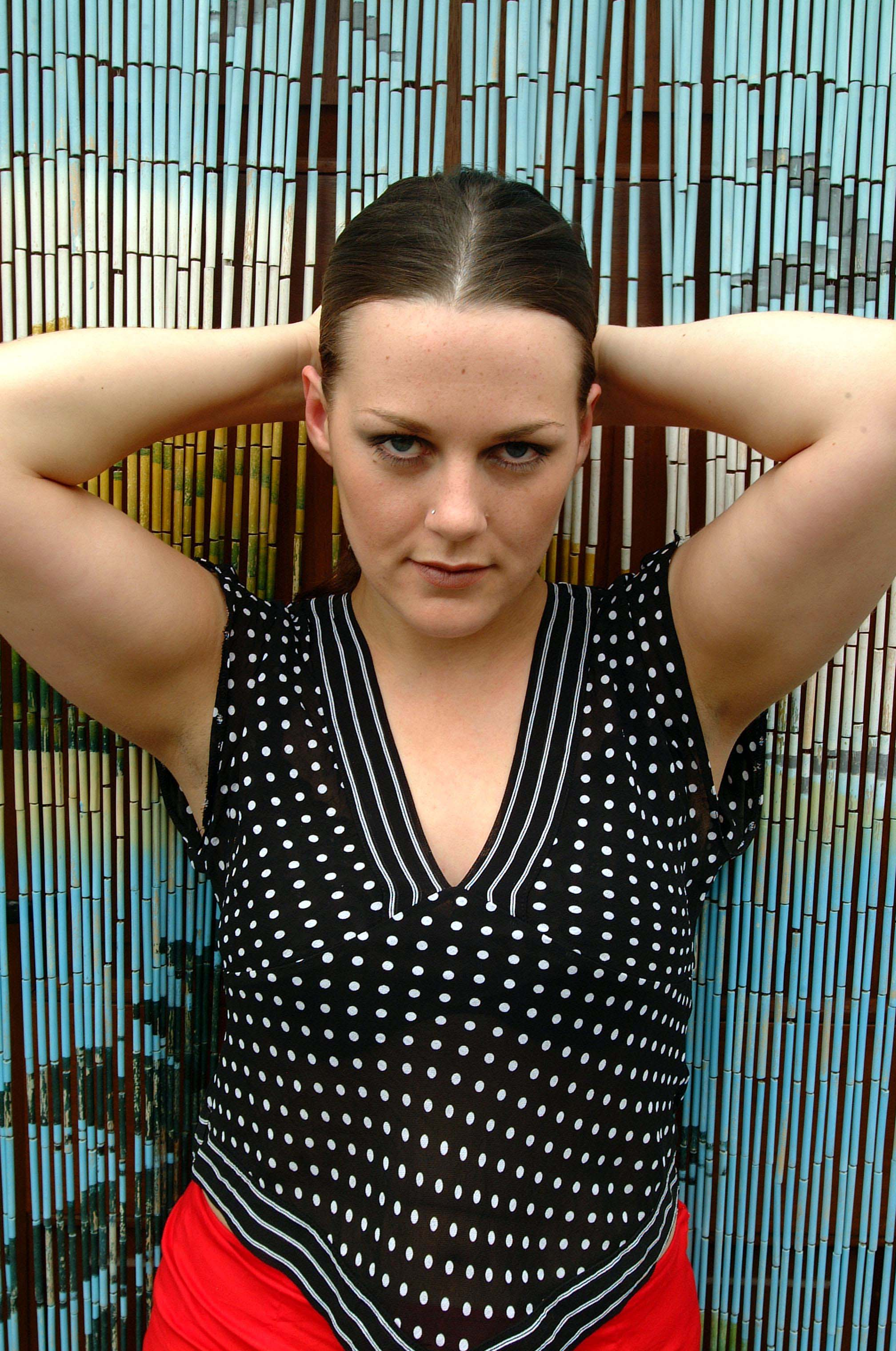
- While in 2003

Background information
- Origin: Barrow-in-Furness, Cumbria, England
- Genres: Folk music, country music, Americana, soul music
- Occupation: Singer-songwriter
- Instruments: Vocals, Acoustic guitar and Percussion
- Years active: 1997–present
- Formerly of: Albion Band, e2K, Fairport Convention, Reel and Soul Association
- Website: kelliewhile.co.uk

Kellie While is an English folk singer-songwriter.

== Early career ==
Born in Barrow-in-Furness in Cumbria, she is the daughter of singer-songwriter Chris While and pianist-songwriter Joe While. She began performing with her mother in local folk clubs while still a teenager and became lead singer with the Sefton Youth Jazz Big Band. She began to write her own songs and to learn to play the guitar while still at school and continued to perform in local clubs.

== The Albion Band ==
In 1997, after the departure of her mother and Julie Matthews from the Albion Band she was asked to join by Ashley Hutchings at the age of only nineteen. Kellie took over guitar playing and vocal duties for the band for five years and contributed to two albums. On Happy Accident (1998) she was officially a guest vocalist on three tracks and gained a writing credit with Hutchings on 'Pear Tree'. She did not appear on the 1999 release Before us Stands Yesterday, but was a full member of the band for Christmas Album (1999) and Road Movies (2001), contributing guitars and vocals. She penned the song 'Home Straight' with Joe Broughton and was the sole composer of 'Pieces of Me'. One highlight was her vocal performance on the Broughton/Hutchings penned 'When my son is Grown'. After the official break-up of the Albion Band in 2002 Kellie continued to record and tour with the seasonal project The Albion Christmas Band, contributing to four albums of traditional and new seasonal music.

== e2K ==
In January 2000, while still with the Albions, Kellie joined in the World/Folk band e2K formed out of the break-up of festival favourites Edward II. This resulted in two albums Shift (2001), and If Not Now (2003) on which Kellie took the main vocal duties and which were very well received in the folk and roots press. The band toured for three years with this line-up.

== Tenacious ==
In 2001 Kellie released her first solo album Tenacious, co-produced by Chris While's longtime musical collaborator Julie Matthews, who wrote the title track 'Tenacious Girl' for Kellie based on a description of her by her mother. The album contained a familiar mix of traditional and modern songs and was highly rated by the folk and roots press.

== Reel and Soul Association ==
In 2002 Kellie shared lead vocals with Thea Gilmore, beside musicians Maartin Allcock; John Kirkpatrick, Robbie McIntosh, Michael McGoldrick and Simon Swarbrick in the Reel and Soul Association. The project mixed American soul and British Folk music. The groups eponymously titled album gained considerable mainstream attention which resulted in numerous TV appearances and radio broadcasts including the BBC's Top of the Pops 2.

== Chris and Kellie While ==
In 2004 Kellie collaborated with her mother to produce the album Chris and Kellie While in 2004, notable for its strong harmonies and emotional delivery of standards and some of Chris' best songs. Since then they have toured together regularly, producing a second album, Too Few Songs, in 2006, which showcased some of the best songwriting available from writers including David Francey, Ron Sexsmith and Mike Silver. The album received widespread critical acclaim, as the review in the Daily Telegraph put it 'each song remains a showcase for the delicate, complementary powers of expression of two expert vocalists, truly living up to the "more like sisters" description of one admirer, Ralph McTell'.

== Session work and live appearances ==
Kellie has been a much sought-after contributor to other people's projects. These include contributions to albums by Helen Watson, Roy Bailey, Chris While and Julie Matthews, Kate Rusby and Martin Simpson. She has also been a backing vocalist for Eddi Reader and Beth Nielsen Chapman and has taken part in live collaborations with Pete Morton, Fairport Convention, Emily Slade and Mike Silver. In July 2009 Kellie performed as part of the All-Star Fairport Convention concert at The Barbican. The concert featured surviving original Fairport members Richard Thompson, Ashley Hutchings, Simon Nicol, Dave Mattacks, Iain Matthews and Judy Dyble as well as a host of guest vocalists including Chris While and Teddy Thompson.

== Discography ==
As solo artist

- Tenacious (Mother Records, 2001)

The Albion Band

- Happy Accident (Topic, 1998)
- Christmas Album (HTD, 1999)
- Road Movies (Topic, 2001)
- An Evening with the Albion Band (Talking Elephant Records, 2002)

e2K

- If Not Now (2001, Topic, 2001)
- Shift (Topic, 2003)

The Reel and Soul Association

- The Reel and Soul Association (Flying Sparks Records, 2002)

Chris and Kellie While

- Chris and Kellie While (Fat Cat Records, 2004)
- Too Few Songs (Fat Cat Records, 2006)

The Albion Christmas Band

- An Albion Christmas (Talking Elephant Records, 2003)
- Winter Songs (Talking Elephant Records, 2006)
- Snow on Snow (Talking Elephant Records, 2008)
- A Sound in the Frost Air (Rooksmere, 2011)

As guest vocalist

- Helen Watson, Somersault (Fledg'ling, 1997)
- Emily Slade, Fretless (Rustic Thorn, 2003)
- Ashley Hutchings and Friends, Human Nature (Talking Elephant, 2003)
- While & Matthews, Perfect Mistake (Fat Cat, 2004)
- Kate Rusby, The Girl Who Couldn't Fly (Pure Records, 2005)
- Various Artists, The Songs of the BBC Radio Ballads (BBC, 2006)
- Martin Simpson, Prodigal Son (Topic, 2007)
- Fairport Convention, Live at Cropredy 2008 (Matty Grooves, 2008)
- Martin Simpson, True Stories (Topic, 2009)
