= Poor Murdered Woman =

Traditional song

- English folk song
- Catalogue: Roud Folk Song Index 1064
- Genre: Murder ballad
- Language: English
- Published: 1908
- (written c.1834)

"Poor Murdered Woman" (Roud # 1064) is an English traditional folk song. On Tuesday 14 January 1834, the events related in the song were reported in The Times.

The song must date from 1834 or later, as the murdered woman was buried in a pauper's grave, in the churchyard of the Church of St Mary & St Nicholas, Leatherhead, Surrey, England, on 15 January 1834.

== Synopsis ==
A squire out hunting discovers a woman's body on the common. The hounds detect the corpse, but are kept at bay; the hunting party examines the surrounding undergrowth, but find nothing else. They announce the gruesome find in the local village, but it is too late to move the body before nightfall. The next day, a Sunday, a huge crowd gathers to witness the scene and conclude that the woman had met a violent death. The body is transported to a nearby inn, a coroner's jury is assembled and quickly agree that the death has been unlawful. The unknown woman is prepared for burial at a church in Leatherhead, but her funeral is a lonely affair, bereft of mourners. The narrator reminds the listener that, although unidentified, the murderer will eventually face judgement for their deeds.

== Commentary ==
=== Background ===
In her 1908 Lucy Broadwood edition notes that the song has "a fine Dorian tune" and reports that Rev. Charles J. Shebbeare, at Milford, Surrey, had collected the song from a young labourer, for whom it was a favourite song. The Vicar of Leatherhead, Rev. E. J. Nash had questioned Mr. Lisney, an 87-year-old, in February 1908 and had confirmed the accuracy of the account related in the ballad. Lisney suggested that the ballad has been composed by Mr. Fairs, a brickmaker of Leatherhead Common. (Note: Button (2015) suggests the composer was Leatherhead bricklayer James Fields.) The Journal of the Folk Song Society, Vol. I, p. 186 records the original singer's version of names as "Yankee" for "Hankey" and "John Sinn" for "John Simms" of the Royal Oak Inn. Broadwood says:

This song is only one of many proofs that "ballets" are made by local, untaught bards, and that they are transmitted, and survive, long after the events which they record have ceased to be a reality to the singer.

On Tuesday 14 January 1834, the events related in the song were reported in The Times.

=== Standard references ===
- Roud 1064

==== Printed versions ====
"Poor Murdered Woman" was published in 1908 by Lucy Broadwood in her collection English Traditional Songs and Carols (London, Boosey). She had obtained it from Shebbeare, who had collected it in 1897 from a Mr. Forster of Milford, a young labourer.

== Recorded versions ==
- 1968, Martin Carthy (guitar, vocal) and Dave Swarbrick (mandolin), But Two Came By (Topic Records); and reissued on the compilation albums: This Is... Martin Carthy (1971), A Collection (1999), and Essential (2011). Carthy comments in the liner notes for his 1968 album: "'The Poor Murdered Woman Laid on the Cold Ground' is a fairly short and simple song which describes what I can only describe as a non-event, but it is the kind of song to which I am attracted, as having a lot more underneath it than is at first obvious. No one know who this woman is, nor where she comes from, but everyone nonetheless is stirred to action." Carthy replaces the tune from the Journal of the Folk Song Society, Vol. I, with the Scottish "Blaeberry Courtship". He omits the final verse used by Collins.
- 1993, John & Mary on The Weedkiller's Daughter (Rykodisc).
- 1971, Shirley Collins and the Albion Country Band, No Roses (Pegasus Records). Collins said of the song, "It's a song I never forget. It's one of my favourite songs and it goes through my head ... very frequently. It's a song I don't lose track of at all and I think of it often."
- 2011, Gordon Jackson, It's Cold by the Door (own label). The sleeve notes observe that the song "tells the story in quite some detail."
- 2011, Jackie Oates,Saturnine (ECC Records). Reviewing Oates' album for brightyoungfolk.com, Mike Hough said, "The gloomy material of Poor Murdered Woman is lightened by the bright percussion accompaniment to Jackie's vocals."
- 2011, Olivia Chaney, The Woodbine & Ivy Band (Folk Police). Of this version KLOF said, "Poor Murdered Woman is a great moment of tradition meets alt-country on which Olivia Chaney sounds incredibly timeless."
- 2014, Ulver, a Norwegian experimental electronica band. The track was recorded in support of Burning Bridges & Fifth Column Film's project The Ballad of Shirley Collins (Earth Recordings), a film, book and tribute album honouring the life and work of Collins.
