= Edward II (band) =

English folk and reggae band

- Origin: Cheltenham, Gloucestershire, England
- Genres: Folk, British folk rock, reggae, and World music
- Years active: 1980–2003, 2009
- Labels: Cooking Vinyl (1987–9), Zest (1991–6), Ock (1998–2000), Topic (2001–3) Cadiz (2009)
- Past members: See: Band members section
- Website: http://edwardthesecond.co.uk

Edward II (known also as EII, and previously as Edward the Second and the Red Hot Polkas and e2K) are an English band which play a fusion of world music, English folk and reggae.

Active from 1980, the band broke up after losing several key members in 1999, relaunching as "e2K" in 2000. In 2003, the band dissolved once more, but have since reformed for a one-year reunion tour in 2009 under the "Edward II" name, celebrating the tenth anniversary of the breakup of the original band. They reformed in 2015 specifically to produce the Manchester's Improving Daily project, which includes the release of new recorded material and a book.

The project is designed to celebrate a collection of tunes written in Manchester during the Industrial Revolution, published as Broadsides and currently held in Manchester Central Library. In 2021 Edward II released the album "Dancing Tunes", bringing their own unique style to a collection of traditional and historic Jamaican calypso and mento songs that pre-date reggae as we know it today.

== History ==
=== Edward the Second and the Red Hot Polkas ===
The band formed in Cheltenham, Gloucestershire in 1980, in order to play for monthly dances at The Victory Club. Founder members Lizzy Howe-Pellant (melodeon) and Dion Cochrane (tenor banjo) were joined by Paul Burgess, Floss Headford and John Gill (fiddles), Martin Brinsford (sax) and Dave Haines (melodeon and concertina), and bringing in Richard Valentine on piano and as caller. It ran for a year or so in that form.

The Band personnel gradually changed over the years, and in around 1983, Rod Stradling (2-row melodeon) and Danny Stradling (percussion) - newly parted from the Old Swan Band - were asked to join, and John Gill changed from fiddle to bass. With this lineup, in 1985, they recorded a cassette called Demos, and a second one, Promos, in 1986, by which time Dion had left, replaced by Jon Moore (lead guitar) and they had added two rhythm guitar players, Tom Greenhalgh (from the Mekons) and Barn Stradling. At the end of 1986 they recorded a further 6 tracks which, together with the 5 Promos ones were published as Ethos. By 1987 the band had added Steve Goulding (drums), and with this lineup recorded the LP Let's Polkasteady: Edward the Second, Cooking Vinyl COOK 007, in 1987.

At a time when the emerging folk rock movement was flourishing as part of the broader folk revival, the band decided that a more natural connection would be with the reggae music of Jamaica, rather than the punk rock they were more familiar with. This came from the rationale that the two music forms were harmonically very similar, were both clearly folk music, the two nations sea-faring heritage, but most importantly to make the politically motivated argument that Britain was and always had been an island of immigrants and that this was reflected in the UK's musical heritage. There was also no doubt at the time of the slow and steady impact the West Indian communities, brought to the UK as part of the Windrush migration, was starting to have on British urban culture, and the early Edward II collective were heavily involved in the emerging anti-fascist Rock Against Racism movement.

The band made their LP debut in 1987 with Let's Polka Steady!, with British dub producer Mad Professor, which contained several reggae inspired instrumentals and is usually considered the highpoint for the original line up. However, it was as a live act that they made their name with a series of gigs at festivals throughout the UK and Europe. Further additions to the fluid line-up during the late 80s included Neil Yates (trumpet), Lorna Bailey (vocals), John Hart (trombone), Gavin Sharp (tenor saxophone), and Alton Zebby (drums), all of whom made their début on the second album Two Step To Heaven (1989).

The collective's centre of gravity moved with John Gill (bass player, producer and assistant engineer on Never Mind the Bollocks) to Manchester, where he soon developed connections with the reggae musicians surrounding Moss Side and specifically the Rastafarian organisation, The Twelve Tribes of Israel. From this fertile ground (and after John Gill's departure) the long-standing line-up, familiar to those that followed the band throughout the nineties, was formed.

=== Edward II ===
At the start of the 90s the band shortened their name to Edward II and then EII, with Moore, Yates, Sharp, Hart and Zebby joined by new members Tee Carthy (bass), Glen Latouche (vocals), Rees Wesson (melodeon/accordion), and rapper McKilla on 1991's Wicked Men. Ex-Albion Band member Simon Care (melodeon) joined Edward II in the mid-90s, featuring on the studio albums Zest and This Way Up. The last of these featured some pure reggae tunes, including ‘Don't Let the Fire Go Out’, but the album still retrained more-culturally blended songs. The band performed twice at the Cropredy Folk Festival, held every year by Fairport Convention and one of these performances was released on CD entitled Live at Cropredy (2000). After a ‘sell out’ gig at De Montfort Hall, Leicester on 19 November 1999, Zebby, Latouche, and Carthy elected to leave the band, and this line-up dissolved.

=== e2K ===
Moore, Yates, and Care re-launched the band in the new millennium as e2K, bringing in Ghanaian instrumentalist Kwame Yeboah, and Albion Band lead singer and guitarist Kellie While. The new infusion of African and traditional British folk influences re-energized the band for two more albums: Shift ( 2001) and If Not Now (2003). Devotees may feel that this line up could not recapture the originality and vitality of the EII days, but they won some appreciation of their music, being described as ‘a multicultural group for the 21st century', whilst popular folk reviewers Living Tradition said of their last album If Not Now that "this is an album that crosses a lot of barriers and the folk world should be proud to count them as one of their own." The lineup dissolved after a tour in 2003.

=== Reunion ===
The last line-up of EII undertook a series of reunion gigs in 2009 to celebrate the ten-year anniversary of their final gig. A double-disc 'best-of' album was also released in 2009, Edward II: The Definitive Collection. It uses the 'Edward II' name but covers the band's entire career under all of their names except for e2K. Disc 1 includes songs from their time as Edward the Second and the Red Hot Polkas, whilst Disc 2 includes songs from their time as Edward II.

=== Manchester's Improving Daily ===
Taking place throughout 2015 and 2016 the band have come back together, inspired by the discovery of the repertoire known as the Manchester Broadsides and the history and stories which lie behind the songs. Produced in Manchester throughout the industrial revolution, this material tells of hardship, politics, social justice and good times as experienced in the nineteenth century. Often a way of spreading news, promoting events, places or businesses or spreading a political or social message, these songs were designed to have a short shelf life and as such were printed on cheap paper and distributed at the markets around what is now the northern quarter of the city.

The Manchester-born Palestinian singer, Reem Kelani, was commissioned by the Manchester International Festival in 2007 to write a 30-minute composition and to orchestrate and lead its performance by the Beating Wing Orchestra, an assembly of local migrant musicians. Her "Paradise in Strangers" encompassed melodic modes and rhythmic patterns from the wide diversity of origins of the orchestra members. In the concluding movement, Kelani opened with the "Soldier’s Farewell to Manchester" (1859), and the composition closed with a resounding chorus from the whole cast of "Manchester’s Improving Daily"(1830).

The music critic, Mike Butler, wrote thus in the Manchester Metro: "Kelani mischievously sprang the biggest surprise with the final section – an adaption in 6/8 time of a Manchester broadside ballad. It was the first full outing for her own incomparable voice, and surely represented a reconciliation with her birthplace: Reem Kelani is the world’s most prominent Manchester-born Palestinian singer. This impression was confirmed when the singers began chanting in unison, ‘sing hey, sing ho, sing hey down gai-ly, Manchester’s improving dai-ly.’ Exile has its bright moments too."

== Discography ==
As Edward The Second and The Red Hot Polkas

- Demos (self published cassette, 1985)
- Promos (self published cassette, 1986)
- Ethos (self published cassette, 1986)
- Let's Polkasteady! (Cooking Vinyl, 1987)
- Two Step to Heaven (Cooking Vinyl, 1989)

As Edward II

- Wicked Men (Pure Bliss, 1991)
- Zest (Zest, 1996)
- This Way Up (Ock, 1998)
- Live at Cropredy (Ock, 2000)
- Edward II: The Definitive Collection (Cadiz Music Ltd, 2009)
- Manchester's Improving Daily (Cadiz Music Ltd)
- Dancing Tunes (2021)

As E2k

- Shift (Topic, 2001)
- If Not Now (Topic, 2003)

Compilation appearances

- The Cutting Edge: A Selection of Contemporary British Roots Music (Cooking Vinyl, 1987) (song: "The Walls of Butlins")
- Reggae Sampler Vol. II (Adventures in Music, 1992) (song: "She's Gone to California")
- The Rough Guide to English Roots Music (World Music Network, 1998) (song: "Brilliant Pebbles")
- An Anthology: The Boxset (Album by Simon Care, 2002) (song: "Brilliant Pebbles" with Simon Care)
- BBC Radio 2 Folk Awards 2010 (PMD, 2010) (song: "People Get Ready")
