= Fledg'ling Records =

- Founded: 1995
- Founder: David Suff
- Genre: British folk, folk rock
- Country of origin: England
- Location: London
- Official website: thebeesknees.com

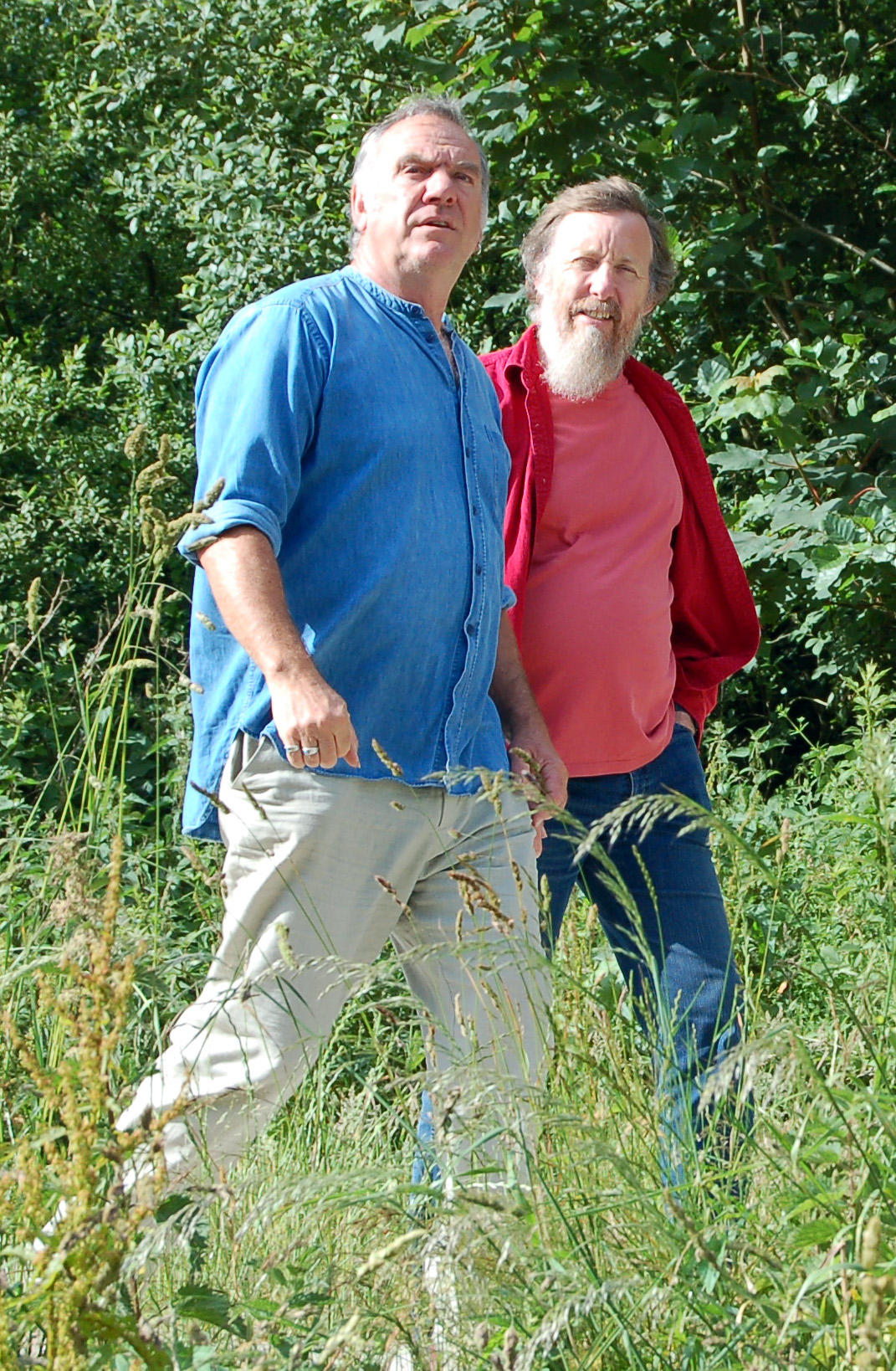
Fledg'ling founder David Suff (right of photo) with singer-songwriter Ralph McTell (left) photographed in Cornwall in 2006

Fledg'ling Records is a British independent record label founded in 1991. The label has re-released some albums previously issued by Hokey Pokey Records which was also run by the Fledg'ling founder—David Suff. David Suff having been half of the team running the Richard Thompson fanzine—"Hokey Pokey" (named after a Richard and Linda Thompson LP). Both record labels specialise in classic and new British folk and folk-rock. Fledg'ling is based in London.

Their first release was Alright Jack by Home Service in 1991 (FLY 001). Indeed, no other records can be traced on the label until another album by Home Service "Wild Life" in 1995. Many of the early releases feature contributions by Graeme Taylor. The graphic artist David Suff is the only publicly acknowledged name to be associated with the label.

They are funded or supported by enthusiasts of this kind of music - Richard Thompson and Davey Graham. The most acclaimed releases by Fledg'ling have been boxed sets of Sandy Denny, Shirley Collins and Ralph McTell, and three albums by Helen Watson (Somersault (1997), Doffing (1999) and Lifesize (2002)).

In 2016, Dom Flemons played alongside the British guitarist Martin Simpson, to jointly record the Fledg'ling Records album, A Selection of Ever Popular Favourites.

== See also ==
- List of record labels
