= The Rough Guide to English Roots Music =

Compilation album by Various artists
- Released: 25 August 1998
- Genre: World, Folk music of England
- Length: 70:53
- Label: World Music Network

Full series chronology
The Rough Guide to Salsa (1997)	The Rough Guide to English Roots Music (1998)	African Blues (1998)

The Rough Guide to English Roots Music is a world music compilation album originally released in 1998. Part of the World Music Network Rough Guides series, the album features mainly English folk, with some tracks covering other cultures from England's ethnic range. Most pieces are from the 1990s. Phil Stanton, co-founder of the World Music Network, was the producer.

== Critical reception ==
Professional ratings
Review scores
Source	Rating
Allmusic	4.5/5 stars

The album received generally positive reviews. Writing for AllMusic, Steven McDonald praised the track choices, saying it functions well as an "appetizer". BBC Music Magazine noted that instead of focusing on the preservers of tradition, the album featured "creators and extenders".

== Track listing ==
No.	Title	Artist	Length
1.	"Lucky Break"	Hank Dogs	4:39
2.	"Trip"	Eliza Carthy	5:22
3.	"Sail on By"	Oysterband	3:29
4.	"Claudy Banks"	Waterson–Carthy	6:45
5.	"Be My Rambling Woman"	Rory McLeod	4:23
6.	"Gypsy's Lullaby/The Hawk/Memories/Coates Hall"	Billy Pigg	4:57
7.	"The Begging Song"	Martin Carthy & Dave Swarbrick	4:30
8.	"A Lord of Steam and Iron"	John Kirkpatrick	3:40
9.	"Falling Slowly"	Coope Boyes and Simpson	3:11
10.	"Hopping Down in Kent"	Louise Fuller	2:03
11.	"Country Life"	The Watersons	1:58
12.	"Byker Hill"	The Barely Works	5:06
13.	"Brilliant Pebbles"	Edward II	4:17
14.	"Yellow Dress"	The Albion Band	4:45
15.	"Red Wing Polka"	Daisy Bulwer, Walter Bulwer, Billy Cooper, Reg Hall, Mervyn Plunkett & Russell Wortley	2:24
16.	"Bold Fisherman"	Harry Cox	2:49
17.	"The Baker"	Savourna Stevenson, June Tabor, & Danny Thompson	4:22
18.	"A New England"	Billy Bragg	2:13
