= Battle of the Field =

Studio album by The Albion Country Band
- Released: 1976
- Recorded: 1973
- Studio: Sound Techniques and Island Studio
- Genre: Folk rock
- Length: 36:25
- Label: Island
- Producer: John Wood

The Albion Country Band chronology
No Roses (with Shirley Collins) (1971)	Battle of the Field (1976)	The Prospect Before Us (1977)

Professional ratings
Review scores
Source	Rating
Allmusic	4.5/5 stars

Battle of the Field is a folk rock album by the Albion Country Band, recorded in summer 1973.

The performers involved were the last ("Mark 3") incarnation of the band, comprising founding members Ashley Hutchings and Simon Nicol on bass guitar and guitar, respectively, supplemented by Martin Carthy, John Kirkpatrick and Sue Harris on concertina / accordion, and oboe / hammered dulcimer, respectively, and Roger Swallow on drums. The band split up later the same year and the album remained unreleased until 1976, although two tracks received some earlier exposure via their inclusion on the influential 1975 compilation The Electric Muse.

== Recording and production ==
The album was produced and engineered by John Wood, and was recorded at Sound Techniques Studio, Chelsea, London and Island Studio, St Peter's Square, London. The album cover was designed by Ian Logan Associates with photographs by Keith Morris, and the original LP sleeve notes were by Rod McShane. One track, "Reaphook and Sickle" was recorded three years later, prior to the release of the record, by Kirkpatrick and Harris alone assisted by Dave Mattacks on percussion, to fill a gap left by the dropping of one originally recorded track "All of a Row", which the band felt unhappy with and had since been re-worked by Carthy for inclusion on a solo album in the mean time.

== Track listing ==
All tracks traditional, arranged by Carthy, Harris, Hutchings, Kirkpartrick, Nicol and Swallow except "Albion Sunrise" and "New St. George" composed by Richard Thompson.

== Side 1 ==
1. "Albion Sunrise" – 2:54
2. Morris Medley: "Mouresque" / "London Pride" / "So Selfish Runs The Hare" (song) / "Maid of the Mill" / "Sheriff's Ride" – 7:14
3. "I Was a Young Man" (Roud 1572) – 4:03
4. "New St. George" – 2:37
5. "La Rotta" – 1:37

== Side 2 ==
1. "Gallant Poacher" – 4:26 (Roud 793)
2. "Cheshire Rounds" / "The Old Lancashire Hornpipe" – 2:42
3. "Hangèd I Shall Be" – 6:20
4. "Reaphook and Sickle" – 2:44 (Roud 1375)
5. "Battle of the Somme" (instrumental, W. Lawrie) – 1:48

== Personnel ==
- Martin Carthy – vocals, acoustic guitar
- Sue Harris – vocals, oboe, hammered dulcimer
- Ashley Hutchings – vocals, electric bass guitar
- John Kirkpatrick – vocals, Anglo concertina, button accordion, melodeon, electric piano
- Simon Nicol – vocals, electric and acoustic guitars, electric dulcimer, synthesiser
- Roger Swallow – drums, percussion

with

- Dave Mattacks – percussion on "Reaphook and Sickle"
- Martin Nicholls, John Iveson, Colin Sheen and Paul Beer – sackbuts on "Gallant Poacher"
