= Sue Harris =

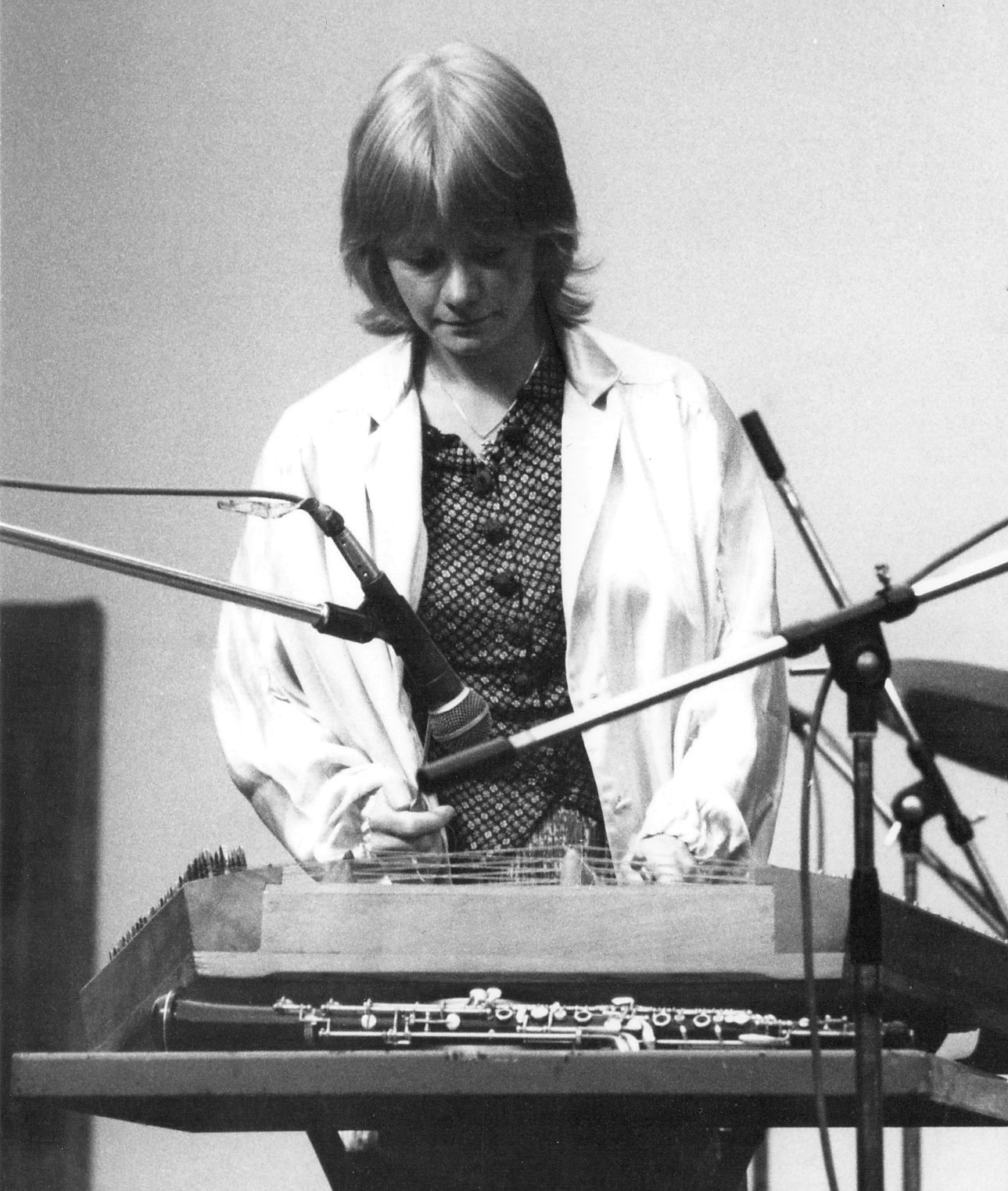
- Harris on stage at Greenwich, London, 1982

Background information
- Born: 17 May 1949 (age 76)
- Origin: Coventry, Warwickshire, England
- Instruments: Oboe, hammered dulcimer, vocals
- Labels: Topic, Island
- Spouse: John Kirkpatrick (1973 – ?)
- Website: Facebook page

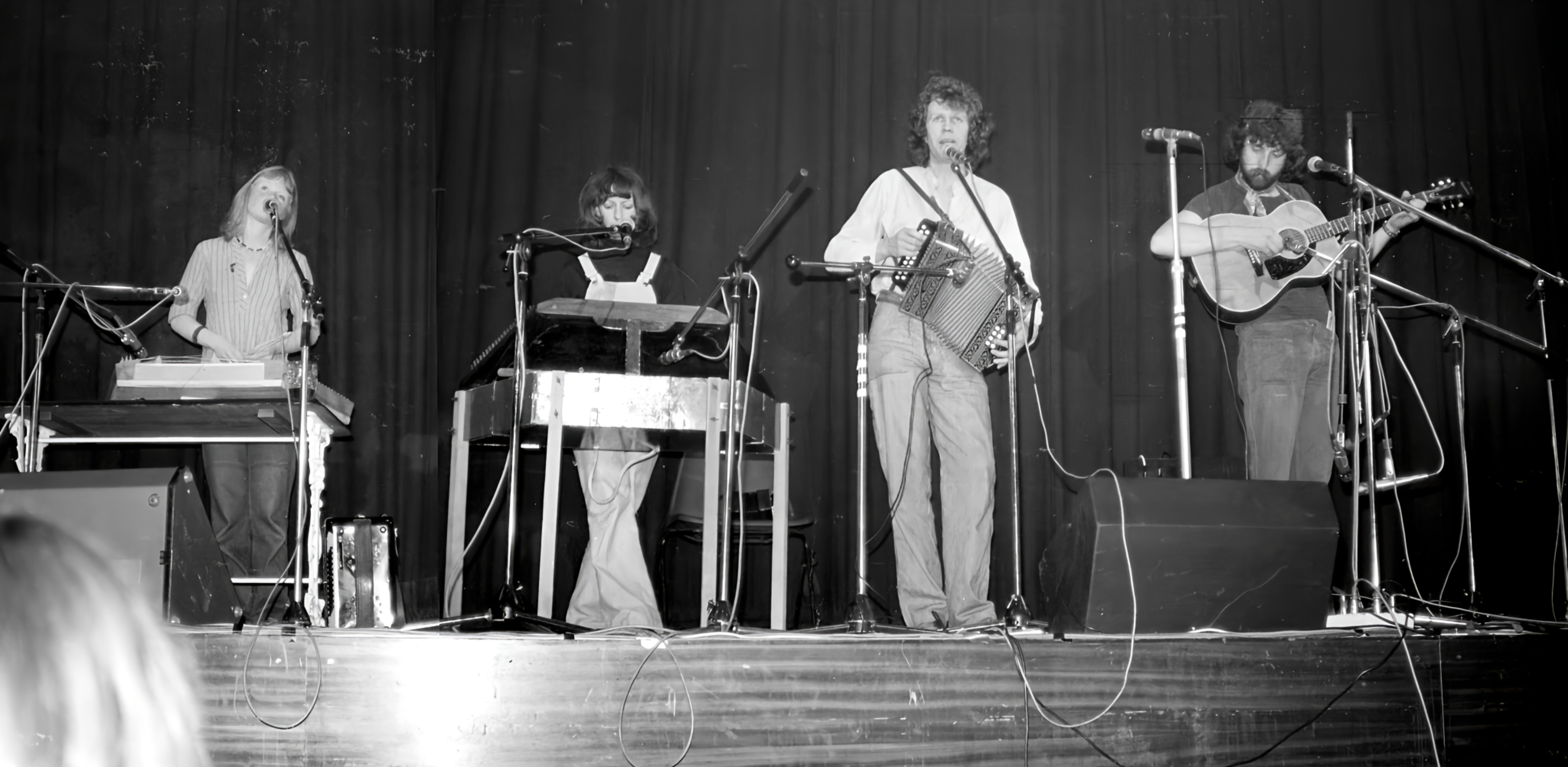
At the Norwich Festival, 1977: (l-r: Sue Kirkpatrick (Harris), Pennie Harris, John Kirkpatrick, Geoff Harris)

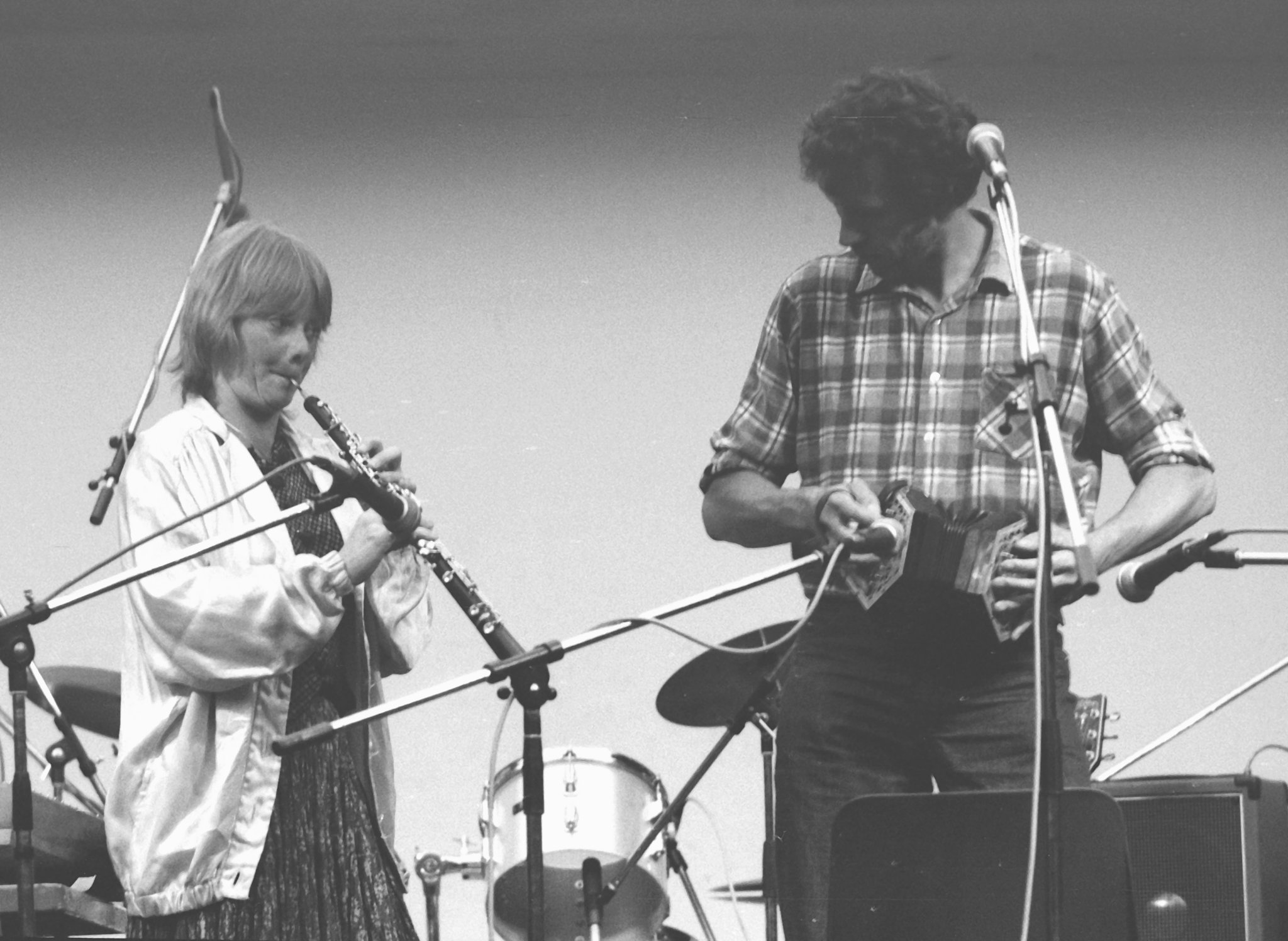
Sue Harris and John Kirkpatrick on stage at Greenwich, London, 1982

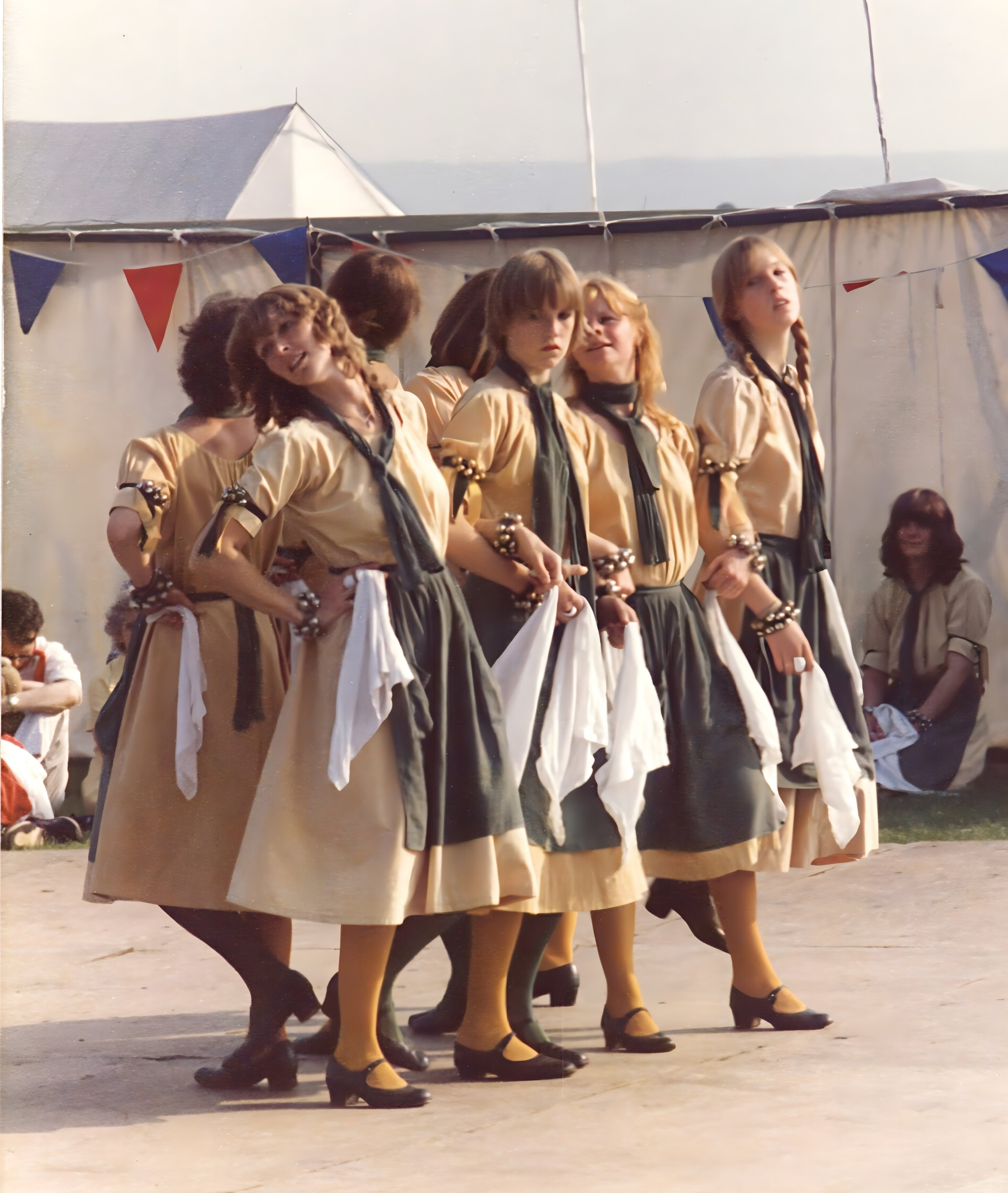
Harris (second from right) with Martha Rhoden's Tuppenny Dish (Border Morris team), Towersey Festival, 1980

Sue Harris (born 17 May 1949) is an English musician classically trained as an oboeist, but latterly best known for her folk music performances with the hammered dulcimer. From the early 1970s to the early 1990s she frequently performed in partnership with her then husband John Kirkpatrick before pursuing other musical interests since that time. Other bands with which she has been associated include the Albion Country Band, Umps and Dumps, the English Country Blues Band, PolkaWorks, and the English Dulcimer Duo.

== Biography ==
Harris was born and grew up in Coventry, Warwickshire, England and started off learning classical music, her instruments of choice being the piano supplemented later by the oboe. She trained as a teacher with music as her main subject. Moving to London in 1970 for her first teaching position, she taught for a year and one term, sang in the London Student Chorale, met folk musician and morris dancing enthusiast John Kirkpatrick, joined "Dingle's Chillybom Band" in which he was playing, and then formed a duo with Kirkpatrick playing oboe to his melodeon and Anglo concertina while they both sang, performing as an act around the UK folk clubs from the beginning of 1972. She made her recorded debut singing (as a backing vocalist and with others from the London Student Chorale) and playing recorder and oboe on the latter's solo album Jump at The Sun, released in 1972. Eventually they produced seven albums together on Topic Records, commencing with The Rose of Britain's Isle in 1974 through to 1980's Facing the Music. The couple married in 1973 and meanwhile moved first to Wolverhampton then to Aston on Clun in Shropshire. Once in Shropshire, they folded Dingle's Chillybom Band since the members were by now too dispersed to continue, and started a new outfit "Umps and Dumps" with various members including at different times, John Tams, Tufty Swift, Derek Pearce and Alan Harris; the band went on to release one album, The Moon's In A Fit, on Topic in 1980.

Meanwhile in 1972 the duo had been approached by Ashley Hutchings to join the second incarnation of his Albion Country Band, however Kirkpatrick and Harrs were fully booked with club engagements so could not join until early 1973, when (along with Martin Carthy) they became a part of "Albion Country Band Mark 3", the previous ("Mark 2" line-up) incorporating Richard and Linda Thompson as a temporary measure following the departure of original members Royston Wood, Steve Ashley and Sue Draheim, in addition to a change of drummer. This lineup recorded tracks for one album, Battle of the Field in 1973, however the album was not released until 1976.

After relocating to Shropshire, Harris and Kirkpatrick were approached by a local school to teach some morris dances and decided there was an opening for the creation of 2 new Morris Dance sides, one for men (The "Shropshire Bedlams") and one for women ("Martha Rhoden's Tuppenny Dish"), to specialise in a revival (substantially re-imagined in fact) of the "Border Morris" tradition local to the region; these sides were created by the respective parties in 1975 and continue to the present time, although in a 2000 talk, Kirkpatrick noted that Harris had ceased dancing with the Martha Rhodens around 2 to 3 years before.

While playing with Umps and Dumps, Harris became pregnant with the couple's first child and it was decided that the breath requirements of playing the oboe were too risky for the pregnancy. John Tams had just acquired a hammered dulcimer and suggested that Harris might like to try it, resulting in her acquiring a serious interest in the instrument to the extent that for a while, "she hardly played anything else at all" although by the time of a 1980 interview with Kirkpatrick, she had returned to playing the oboe "fairly equally" with the dulcimer once more. In taking up the hammered dulcimer, previously little known in the UK folk revival, she became one of the foremost performers on that instrument in the UK folk scene of the day. (Note: The hammered dulcimer, known just as the "dulcimer" by its traditional English players, had been widely used in East Anglia (plus a small number of other UK locations) as one of several instruments played to accompany traditional dances since at least the 1850s, but was little known outside that area; among the first records to shine a spotlight on its use to a wider, revival audience was Topic Records' English Country Music From East Anglia, released in 1973. Physically it resembles (to some extent) the inside of a piano with its own soundbox, placed either flat or up-angled on a table top or a stand, and is played with hammers, or on occasion, picked with the fingers. How and why John Tams obtained such an instrument is not publicly indicated.) In 1980, playing hammered dulcimer she teamed up with melodeon player Rod Stradling and the duo Ian A. Anderson and his then wife Maggie Holland as The English Country Blues Band, which produced two albums from that line-up, before Harris left, being replaced by Chris Coe on the same instrument.

Harris' last "original period" performances with John Kirkpatrick are noted as being in 1992; it appears that their professional and personal relationship dissolved around that time, although precise details are unknown. (Note: John Kirkpatrick remarried: his second wife, Sally, is credited supplying additional vocals on his 2006 CD Carolling & Crumpets, in addition to the same on later albums God Speed The Plough (2011) and Every Mortal Place (2012). She died from cancer-related complications in 2014.)

Harris has also performed with Richard and Linda Thompson, and has been a composer for the BBC on various broadcast plays, as well as for live theatre. She is also a singer and has written music for choral groups.

In 2008 she was leader of the "Wild Angels Community Choir" in Welshpool, Powys, Wales. The same year she joined Jeannie Harris, Nina Hansell, Katie Howson, Fi Fraser and Gareth Kiddier to form the ceilidh band PolkaWorks, still active in 2025; they released an album, Borrowed Shoes in 2014.

Following the World Dulcimer Congress held in Malvern, Worcestershire in 2015, Harris formed the English Dulcimer Duo with Lisa Warburton. The duo has toured extensively, performing a repertoire of English and Welsh tunes.

In 2024 Harris was cited as running choirs in the Shropshire-Welsh Borders region, being Castle Voices, Clun Singers and Whitton Voices, and was featured in a reunion gig in June 2024 with John Kirkpatrick plus their son Benji Kirkpatrick, a successful musician in his own right, followed by several repeat performances. A live recording of a gig by this lineup was released as the CD Live at the Wyeside in 2025.

== Discography ==
=== Solo albums ===
- Hammers and Tongues (Free Reed Records FRR 020, 1978)
- Pastorela (Beautiful Jo Records, 2002)

=== Albion Country Band ===
- Battle of the Field (Island Records, 1976)

=== The English Country Blues Band ===
- No Rules (1982)
- Unruly (2014)

=== John Kirkpatrick and Sue Harris ===
- The Rose of Britain's Isle (1974)
- The Bold Navigators (with Jon Raven) (1975)
- Plain Capers – Morris Dance Tunes From the Cotswolds (1976)
- Among The Many Attractions at the Show will be a Really High Class Band (1976)
- The English Canals Songs, Narration, Contemporary Extracts (with Jon Raven) (1976)
- Shreds and Patches (1977)
- Facing the Music (1980)
- Ballad Of The Black Country (1981)
- Stolen Ground (1989)

In 2009 Topic Records included in their 70-year anniversary boxed set Three Score and Ten The Rose Of Britain’s Isle / Glorishears from The Rose Of Britain’s Isle as track thirteen on the second CD.

=== Martin Wyndham-Read, Sue Harris and Martin Carthy ===
- The Old Songs (1984)
- Across The Line (1986)

=== Various artists – Sue Harris, Old Swan Band et al. ===
- This Label is Not Removable (2007)

=== Tufty Swift ===
- Hammers, Tongues And A Bakewell Tart (2007) (CD reissue of Hammers and Tongues)

=== Umps and Dumps ===
- The Moon's In A Fit (1980) – band members John Kirkpatrick, Sue Harris, Tufty Swift, Alan Harris

== See also ==
- Benji Kirkpatrick
