= Simon Nicol =

English musician (born 1950)

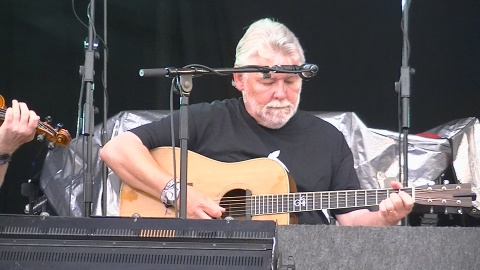
- Simon Nicol performing at Fairport's Cropredy Convention 2014

Background information
- Born: Simon John Breckenridge Nicol; 13 October 1950 (age 75); Muswell Hill, London, England
- Genres: British folk rock
- Occupations: Singer; musician; record producer
- Instruments: Vocals; guitar; dulcimer; synthesizers; drums
- Years active: 1960s–present
- Labels: Track; Island; Vertigo; Woodworm; Matty Grooves
- Website: fairportconvention.com

Simon John Breckenridge Nicol (born 13 October 1950) is an English guitarist, singer, multi-instrumentalist and record producer. He was a founding member of British folk rock group Fairport Convention and is the only founding member still in the band. He has also been involved with the Albion Band and a wide range of musical projects, both as a collaborator, producer and as a solo artist. He has received several awards for his work and career.

== History ==
=== Early career ===
Born in Muswell Hill, North London, England, Nicol was the son of a general practitioner, who died in 1964. He began to play guitar at the age of 11 and left school at 15. In 1966 he was asked to join local band the Ethnic Shuffle Orchestra by bass guitarist Ashley Hutchings, and soon left his job at a local cinema to play full-time. They rehearsed above his father's old surgery in Fairport House, which gave its name to the band he and Hutchings formed with Richard Thompson and Shaun Frater as Fairport Convention in 1967.

=== Fairport Convention 1967–71 ===
As Thompson emerged as the lead guitarist, Nicol moved towards rhythm duties and occasional backing vocals. After some line-up changes the band enjoyed a degree of commercial success in their early years, with three albums and appearing on Britain's most popular music programme Top of the Pops in 1969 with the single "Si Tu Dois Partir", which reached number 21 in the UK Charts. Nicol contributed his first composition to the band for their second album What We Did on Our Holidays, the short instrumental "End of a Holiday". Besides contributing rhythm guitar and backing vocals to this album, Nicol also played the autoharp on some songs. He was injured in the accident that killed drummer Martin Lamble on 12 May 1969, but when he and the band recovered they recorded what is usually considered their masterpiece and the most important single album in British folk rock, Liege and Lief (1969), which is credited as the key recording in the creation of the British folk rock genre and which helped institute a major surge of interest in British folk music.

Almost immediately after the release of the album, Hutchings and vocalist Sandy Denny left the band, who were then joined full-time by Dave Swarbrick on fiddle and by bassist Dave Pegg. While Swarbrick, with his knowledge of traditional music, emerged as the leading figure in the band, Nicol had to shoulder a larger share of the vocal duties on the next album Full House (1970). When Thompson left soon after, Nicol also had to take over lead guitar duties. Although never entirely happy with this role, it was generally thought at the time that he acquitted himself well. He also demonstrated that he was a multi-instrumentalist playing bass guitar, viola and dulcimer. He began song writing on the next two albums Angel Delight and "Babbacombe" Lee (both 1971). "Breakfast in Mayfair" on the latter was his first solo song composition with the band, and one of the tracks that made it onto the History of Fairport Convention compilation album (1972). He also took over some of the production duties on Babbacombe Lee, but his efforts were not well received by the band, and this, together with unhappiness with having to fill Thompson's shoes, led him to decide to move on and in 1971 he left the band, the last of the original members to do so.

=== Albion Band, playing and production 1972–76 ===
Just about the time that Nicol left Fairport Convention, Hutchings had also quit Steeleye Span and began to work on the first incarnation of the Albion Country Band to provide backing for his then wife Shirley Collins. Nicol joined the long list of musicians, including former Fairport members Richard Thompson and Dave Mattacks, to contribute to No Roses (1971), often considered one of the most important British folk rock albums. In 1972 Simon Nicol was part of the by now reduced six-piece-line up of the Albion Country Band featuring vocalists Royston Wood and Steve Ashley, Sue Draheim on fiddle, Ashley Hutchings on bass guitar and Dave Mattacks on drums. This band played a session for BBC Radio 1 and contributed one lengthy song to Steve Ashley's debut album.

Along with Dave Mattacks, Ashley Hutchings, singer Royston Wood, singer and multi-instrumentalist Steve Ashley and American fiddler Sue Draheim Nicol then teamed up with Richard Thompson and Linda Peters (later Linda Thompson) to form the trio Hokey Pokey in 1973. In 1974 this trio expanded into the band Sour Grapes that was assembled to tour in support of the Thompsons' I Want to See the Bright Lights Tonight album. Later that year Nicol played on and co-produced the Thompsons' Hokey Pokey album.

In 1973 he played on what is often considered one of the seminal folk/jazz albums of all time, John Martyn's Solid Air. When Hutchings tried to reform the Albion Band for an album in 1973, Nicol joined again, but the resulting work, Battle of the Field, was not released until 1976. Nicol took part in some of sessions for Hutchings' next project the Etchingham Steam Band, but never formally joined the group. Instead, he added electric guitar and occasional drums to Hutchings' and accordionist John Kirkpatrick's project The Compleat Dancing Master which collects excerpts of English literature and both acoustic and electrified traditional dance music. In 1974–1975 he played guitar on Cat Stevens' Numbers (1975) and also formed a band with Chris Spedding, Pat Donaldson and Gerry Conway. However, this 'supergroup' proved abortive before any recordings were made. Nicol also produced the album Rough Diamonds (1975) for the highly regarded Jack the Lad, and began to play with Swarbrick and Pegg in a low key trio, Three Desperate Mortgages, which toured student venues across Britain.

In 1976 Nicol also was the main guitarist on Ashley Hutchings' second Morris dance revival project, Son of Morris On. This album also featured Morris tunes Nicol had already played with the Albion Country Band in 1972.

=== Return to Fairport 1976–79 ===
Nicol came back to work with Fairport as a sound engineer on what was originally a solo project for Swarbrick, Gottle O' Geer (1976). He played some guitar along with contributions from members of Fairport Convention and it was eventually released as a Fairport album to complete contractual obligations. Enjoying being with a band again, Nicol rejoined, but the times were inauspicious as Gottle O' Geer was not highly regarded. Along with much of Fairport in this period he played on Julie Covington's eponymous album (1977) including the surprise hit single "Only Women Bleed", which reached number twelve in the UK Singles Chart in 1978. In 1977 Nicol joined Hutchings' reformed Albion Dance Band for the album The Prospect Before Us and in 1978 as The Albion Band they produced arguably the finest album of the group's history, Rise Up Like the Sun (1978). In contrast the next two Fairport albums, The Bonny Bunch of Roses (1977) and Tipplers Tales (1978), although well produced and played, and generally thought to have benefited from Nicol's growing guitar technique and confidence in singing, sold so poorly that the record label Vertigo paid the band off. They eventually decided to disband and played a final concert at Cropredy in Oxfordshire on 4 August 1979.

=== Albion Band, Richard and Linda Thompson, Nicol and Swarbrick 1979–85 ===
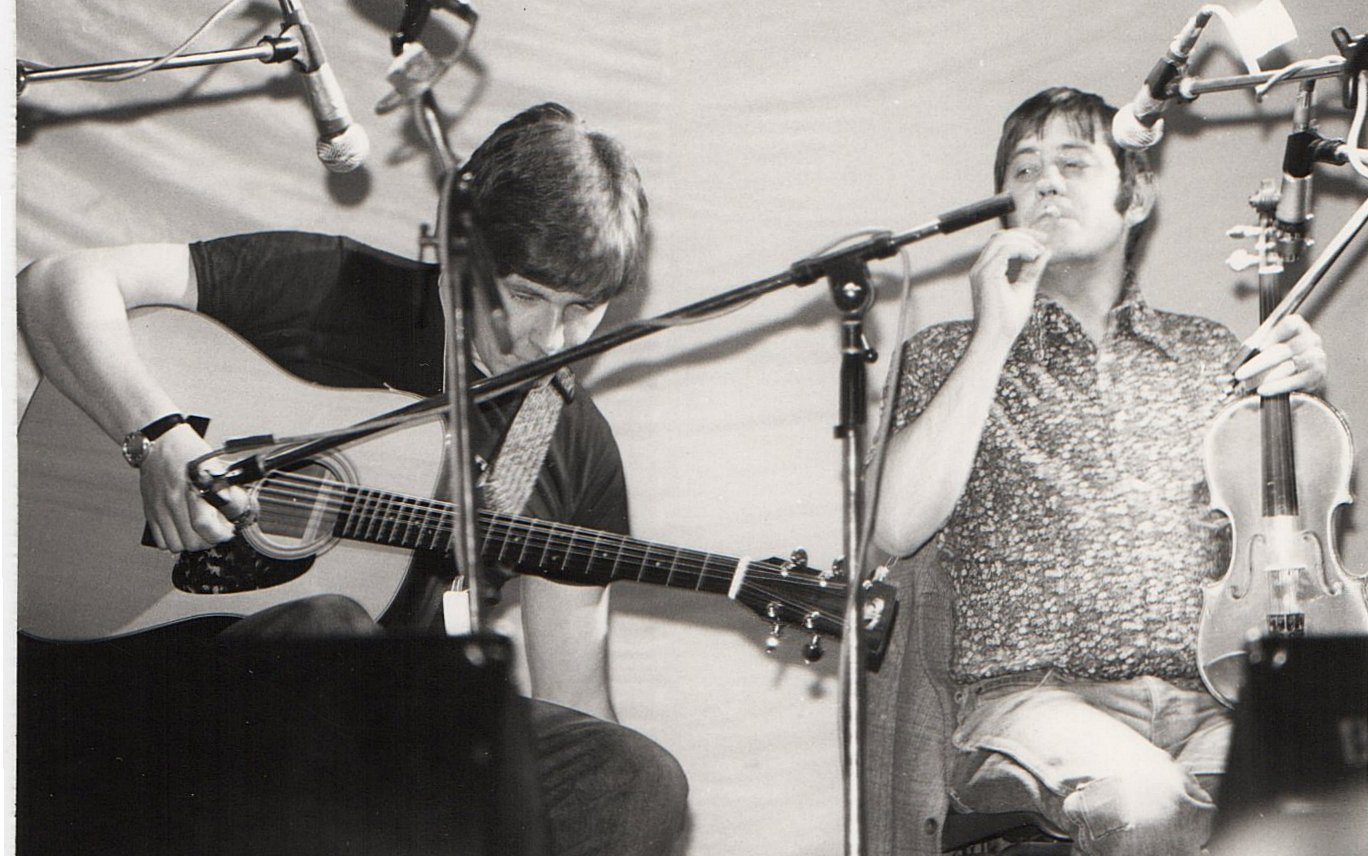
Simon Nicol (left) with Dave Swarbrick at the 1981 Essex Festival

As the members of the group went their separate ways, Nicol returned to the Albion Band to record two albums in 1983. He toured and recorded with Richard and Linda Thompson from 1979 to 1982 and then with Richard Thompson in 1983 and 1984. He also formed an acoustic duo with Dave Swarbrick, with whom he recorded three albums. Nicol also continued to take part in annual reunions with Fairport, at what was by now the Cropredy Festival, to growing crowds. The Angel Delight Fairport lineup of Nicol, Swarbrick, Pegg, and Mattacks played a number of gigs in the UK in the early 80s, then toured extensively in the UK and the US in 1984 and 1985. In 1985 Nicol joined in the recording of the Fairport album Gladys' Leap, on which, as well as playing guitar, he shared production credits, contributed the song "Wat Tyler", arranged traditional tunes and acted as lead singer for the first time. The album was well received, and led to the reformation of the band a year later.

=== Reformations and reunions 1986–present ===
The period 1986–97 was perhaps the busiest in Nicol's career. With Swarbrick absent he finally became the front man for the new Fairport. Most commentators have tended to feel that his developing baritone voice was more than adequate for the task and his vocals on songs like "The Hiring Fair" have been particularly praised. Although Fairport embarked on regular recording and touring, Nicol produced two solo albums in this period: Before Your Time (1987) and Consonant Please Carol (1992). Between 1991 and 1996 he played on three albums by Richard Thompson. From 1993 he rejoined the Albion Band in a new acoustic line-up and with them recorded three highly regarded albums, the first of which, Acousticity (1993), he produced, touring extensively in Europe and America. He also continued to undertake work with a wide variety of artists, including a tour with Art Garfunkel in 1988 and playing on albums by Beverley Craven and Beth Nielsen Chapman. In 1990 he released a video of Singing Games for Children with his wife Sylvia.

In 1997, Nicol left the Albion Band and began to focus more directly on Fairport Convention, but able to share vocal duties with Chris Leslie and taking over some of the responsibility for organising the Cropredy Festival from 2005. He regularly rejoins the now suspended Albion Band for their Albion Christmas tours and continues to record with Fairport and other artists.

In 2009, Nicol reunited with original Fairport Convention vocalist Judy Dyble, playing on two tracks on her album Talking with Strangers. In the same year he performed in Alan Simon's rock opera Anne de Bretagne, playing the role of King Edward IV of England.

== Guitar technique ==
Like Richard Thompson, Nicol uses a hybrid picking technique that uses a pick between thumb and forefinger and remaining fingers to pluck the higher strings, the pick can then be used to strum. Nicol described his technique as 'percussive'. Although Nicol openly admits he lacks Thompson's exceptional lead technique, he is considered one of the most reliable and versatile rhythm players available, as testified by his large number of credits with a wide variety of artists from different genres. In the view of Dave Mattacks, his fellow Fairport member for many years, "he is the best acoustic supportive player I know".

== Recognition ==
As part of Fairport Convention, Nicol received the 'Lifetime achievement award' at the 2002 BBC Radio 2 Folk Awards. At the 2006 Folk Awards he shared in the award for 'Most influential folk album of all time' voted by Radio 2 listeners for Liege and Lief. At the 2007 awards he received an award with Fairport, along with the late Sandy Denny, for 'Favourite folk track of all time' for "Who Knows Where the Time Goes?".

== Discography ==
For Fairport Convention see Fairport Convention discography
For the Albion Band see The Albion Band discography

As solo artist

- Before Your Time (Woodworm, 1987)
- Consonant Please Carol (Woodworm, 1992)
- Before Your Time/Consonant Please Carol (Woodworm, 1998)

With Steve Ashley

- Stroll On (Gull, 1974)
- Demo Tapes (CND, 1980)
- Steve Ashley's Family Album (Woodworm, 1983)
- Mysterious Ways (Lighthouse/LINE, 1990)
- The Test of Time (Market Square, 1999)
- Everyday Lives (Topic, 2001)
- Live In Concert (Dusk Fire, 2006)
- Time and Tide (Topic, 2007)
- Steve Ashley's Family Album Revisited (Talking Elephant 2021)

With Vashti Bunyan

- Just Another Diamond Day (Philips, 1970)

With Beth Nielsen Chapman

- You Hold the Key (Reprise, 1993)

With Shirley Collins

- Anthems in Eden (Harvest, 1969)
- Adieu to Old England (Topic, 1974)

With Julie Covington

- Julie Covington (Fame, 1978)

With Beverley Craven

- Beverley Craven (Epic, 1990)

With Sandy Denny

- Gold Dust (Island, 1998)

With Judy Dyble

- "Talking with Strangers" (Fixit, 2009)

With Art Garfunkel

- Concert (1988)

With Murray Head

- Voices (Mercury, 1980)
- Passion (Justin Time, 2002)

With Mike Heron

- Smiling Men with Bad Reputations (Elektra, 1971)

With John Kirkpatrick and Ashley Hutchings

- The Compleat Dancing Master (Island 1974)

With John Martyn

- Solid Air (Island, 1973)

With Matthews' Southern Comfort

- Matthews' Southern Comfort (Decca, 1970)

With Phil Pickett

- The Bones of All Men (Hannibal, 1998)

With Alan Simon

- Excalibur I – La Légende des Celtes (Sony Music, 1998)
- Excalibur – Le concert mythique (Sony Music, 2000)
- Excalibur II – L'Anneau des Celtes (EMI, 2007)
- Anne de Bretagne (Rue Stendhal, 2009)
- Excalibur III – The Origins (Celluloid, 2012)

With Cat Stevens

- Numbers (A&M, 1975)

With Al Stewart

- Love Chronicles (CBS, 1969) – listed as "Simon Breckenridge"
- Modern Times (CBS, 1975)

With Dave Swarbrick

- In the Club (1981) (Tape)
- Live at the White Bear (White Bear Records, 1982)
- Close to the Wind (Woodworm, 1984)
- Close to the White Bear (Woodworm, 1998)
- Swarbrick 2 (Transatlantic, 1977)
- When We Were Very Young (Talking Elephant, 2010)

With Linda Thompson

- Dreams Fly Away: a History of Linda Thompson (Hannibal, 1996)

With Richard Thompson

- (guitar, vocal) (Island, 1976)
- Hand of Kindness (Hannibal, 1983)
- Across a Crowded Room (Polygram, 1985)
- Doom and Gloom From The Tomb (tape) (Flypaper, 1985)
- Doom and Gloom II (Over My Dead Body) (tape) (Flypaper, 1991)
- Rumor and Sigh (Capitol, 1991)
- Watching The Dark: The History of Richard Thompson (Hannibal, 1993)
- You? me? us? (Capitol, 1996)

With Richard and Linda Thompson

- I Want to See the Bright Lights Tonight (Island, 1974)
- Hokey Pokey (Island, 1975)
- First Light (Chrysalis, 1978)
- Sunnyvista (Chrysalis, 1979)
- Shoot Out the Lights (Hannibal, 1982)
- End of the Rainbow – An Introduction To Richard & Linda Thompson (Island, 2002)

With Royston Wood & Heather Wood

- No Relation (Transatlantic, 1977)
