= Graeme Taylor =

British guitarist (born 1954)

Graeme Taylor (born 2 February 1954 in Stockwell, South-West London) is a British guitarist.

Taylor played lead guitar with 1970s medieval/rock band Gryphon, then played with The Albion Band from 1976 until 1987, and forming folk-rock group Home Service in 1980. With Gryphon he had four best-selling albums, and toured the US, supporting Yes at Madison Square Garden, and the Mahavishnu Orchestra at the Houston Astrodome. In 1975 he played on Steve Howe's debut solo album Beginnings, with two other members of Gryphon, Malcolm Bennett and Dave Oberlé.

Taylor played a major role in the creation and performance of the music for The Mysteries at the National Theatre in 1977 a production - to a text adapted by the poet Tony Harrison - that was revived in 1999, with Taylor in the role of musical director, arranger and composer of additional music.

Having spent many years playing guitars in the pit orchestras of many West End musicals, Taylor became a member of the touring bands for both John Tams and Rolf Harris, and runs his own studio in South London.
