= No Roses =

Studio album by Shirley Collins and The Albion Country Band
- Released: October 1971
- Recorded: 1971
- Studio: Sound Techniques and Air Studios, London
- Genre: Folk rock, English folk
- Length: 33:30
- Label: Pegasus
- Producer: Sandy Roberton, Ashley Hutchings

Shirley Collins chronology
Love, Death and the Lady (with Dolly Collins) (1970)	No Roses (1971)	A Favourite Garland (1973)

The Albion Country Band chronology
No Roses (1971)	Battle of the Field (1976)

Professional ratings
Review scores
Source	Rating
Allmusic	4/5 stars

No Roses is an album by Shirley Collins and the Albion Country Band. It was recorded in the summer of 1971 and produced by Sandy Roberton and Ashley Hutchings, who was Collins' husband at the time. It was released in October 1971 on the Pegasus label.

It is very unusual to have 27 musicians and singers on an album of traditional folk songs. It happened because people simply dropped in during recording sessions and were asked to join in. "The Murder of Maria Marten", a lengthy song about the Red Barn Murder, is broken into segments, with parts of British folk rock alternating with more traditional parts featuring Shirley Collins' voice and a hurdy-gurdy drone. Shirley Collins had used a similar technique on "One Night As I Lay on My Bed" on "Adieu to Old England".

Some songs, for instance "Poor Murdered Woman" and "Murder of Maria Marten", feature large parts of the Fairport Convention line-up of late 1969 (Liege and Lief). In fact, Fairport Convention member Ashley Hutchings appears on all, Simon Nicol and Richard Thompson on eight, and Dave Mattacks on three of the nine songs on this album.

Claudy Banks includes a composed duo performance by Alan Cave on bassoon and British free jazz saxophonist Lol Coxhill – his only performance ever in the context of British folk music. Hal-An-Tow features members of the two acclaimed folk vocal groups The Watersons (Lal and Mike Waterson) and The Young Tradition (Royston Wood). Both drummer Roger Powell and pianist Ian Whiteman previously played together in the band Mighty Baby.

The album title No Roses are the last words of the first verse of the folk song "The False Bride" ("I went down to the forest to gather fine flowers, but the forest won't yield me no roses."), which Shirley Collins sang on her EP Heroes in Love in 1963.

== Track listing ==
All the tracks are arrangements of traditional folk songs. Claudy Banks stems from Ron and Bob Copper. The line-up is according to the folk database Mainly Norfolk.

1. "Claudy Banks" (4:37)
  - Shirley Collins – lead vocals; Ashley Hutchings – bass guitar; Roger Powell – drums; Simon Nicol – electric guitar; Richard Thompson – electric guitar; Ian Whiteman – piano; Dave Bland – concertina; Alan Cave – bassoon; Lol Coxhill – alto saxophone
2. "Little Gipsy Girl" (2:16)
  - Shirley Collins – lead vocals; Ashley Hutchings – bass guitar; Roger Powell – drums; Dave Mattacks – sticks; Simon Nicol – electric guitar; Dave Bland – hammered dulcimer; Tony Hall – melodeon
3. "Banks of the Bann" (3:38)
  - Shirley Collins – lead vocals; Ashley Hutchings – bass guitar; Dolly Collins – piano; Simon Nicol – acoustic guitar; Richard Thompson – acoustic 12-string guitar; John Kirkpatrick – accordion
4. "Murder of Maria Marten" (7:28)
  - Shirley Collins – lead vocals; Nic Jones – backing vocals and fiddle; Ashley Hutchings – bass guitar; Richard Thompson – electric guitar; Simon Nicol – electric guitar; Tim Renwick – electric guitar; Dave Mattacks – drums; Barry Dransfield – fiddle; Francis Baines – hurdy gurdy
5. "Van Dieman's Land" (4:59)
  - Shirley Collins – lead vocals; Ashley Hutchings – bass guitar; Ian Whiteman – piano; Simon Nicol – acoustic guitar; Richard Thompson – electric guitar; Roger Powell – drums; Dave Bland – concertina; Colin Ross – Northumbrian smallpipes; Alan Lumsden – ophicleide
6. "Just as the Tide Was A-Flowing" (2:13)
  - Shirley Collins – lead vocals; Maddy Prior – backing vocals; Ashley Hutchings – bass guitar; Richard Thompson – electric guitar; Roger Powell – drums; Simon Nicol – acoustic guitar; Dave Bland – concertina
7. "The White Hare" (2:43)
  - Shirley Collins – lead vocals; Ashley Hutchings – bass guitar, percussion; Roger Powell – drums; Tim Renwick – acoustic 12-string guitar; Richard Thompson – electric guitar; Royston Wood – backing vocals; Lal and Mike Waterson – backing vocals; Steve Midgen – French horn
8. "Hal-An-Tow" (2:54)
  - Shirley Collins – lead vocals; Ashley Hutchings – bass guitar, percussion; Roger Powell – drums; Tim Renwick – acoustic 12-string guitar; Richard Thompson – slide guitar; Dave Bland – hammered dulcimer; Tony Hall – melodeon; Royston Wood – backing vocals; Simon Nicol – backing vocals; Gregg Butler – serpent; Trevor Crozier – jew's harp
9. "Poor Murdered Woman" (4:17)
  - Shirley Collins – lead vocals; Ashley Hutchings – bass guitar; Dave Mattacks – drums; Dolly Collins – piano; Richard Thompson – electric guitar; Simon Nicol – electric guitar; Dave Bland – concertina

== The Albion Country Band ==
The members of the band are listed on the front of the album:

- Lal Waterson
- Mike Waterson
- Royston Wood
- Francis Baines
- Steve Migden
- Roger Powell
- Richard Thompson
- Colin Ross
- Alan Lumsden
- Maddy Prior
- Simon Nicol
- Ashley Hutchings
- Alan Cave
- Lol Coxhill
- Dave Bland
- Tony Hall
- Tim Renwick
- Ian Whiteman
- Barry Dransfield
- Nic Jones
- Dave Mattacks
- Dolly Collins
- Gregg Butler
- John Kirkpatrick
- Trevor Crozier
