= Home Service =

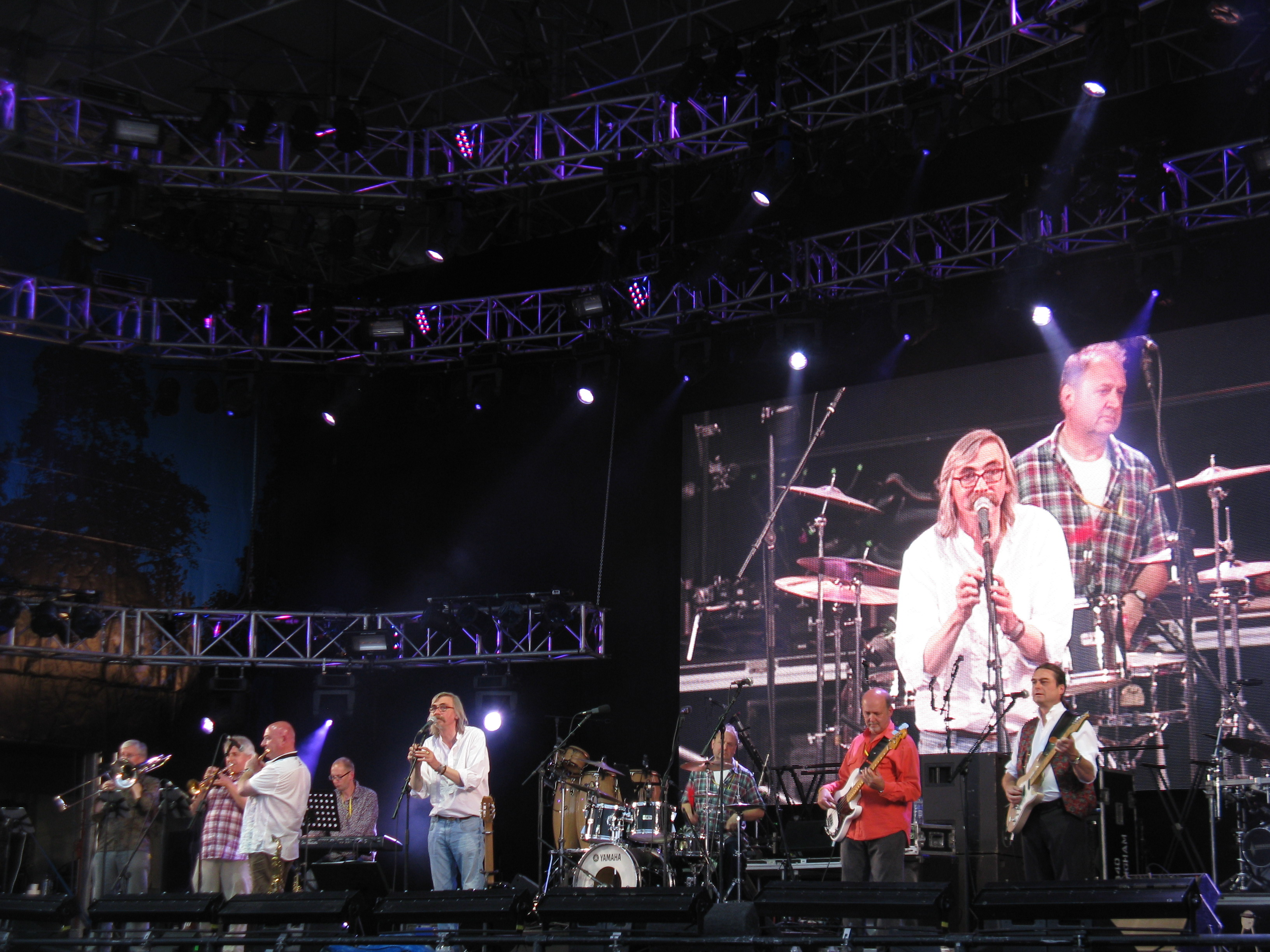
- Home Service at the 2011 Cropredy Festival

Background information
- Origin: England
- Genres: Folk, British folk rock
- Years active: 1980–1987; 1991; 2011–present
- Members: John Tams; Graeme Taylor; Jon Davie; Andy Findon; Steve King; Michael Gregory; Paul Archibald; Roger Williams
- Past members: Bill Caddick; Howard Evans; Malcolm Bennet; Colin Rae
- Website: http://www.homeserviceband.co.uk/

Home Service is a British folk rock group, formed in late 1980 from a nucleus of musicians who had been playing in Ashley Hutchings' Albion Band. Their career is generally agreed to have peaked with the album Alright Jack, and has had an influence on later work. John Tams and several other members of the band, have had solo careers and worked in other projects. In 2016 John Kirkpatrick replaced Tams as main singer in Home Service, and features as such on their next album.

== History ==
=== Origins ===
Home Service was formed out of members of the Albion Band, who had participated in recording Rise Up Like the Sun (1978). Their establishment was partly out of the confusion caused by line-up changes when the Albion Band were playing as, in effect, a house band in Bill Bryden's National Theatre productions in the late 1970s and early 1980s, including Lark Rise to Candleford. Members of the group took part in an adaptation of Michael Herr's Dispatches without band leader Ashley Hutchings. In late 1980, eight members began to rehearse together in Southwark, London and had soon splintered off from the parent band. The original line-up was: John Tams (vocals, melodeon), Bill Caddick (vocals, guitar, dobro), Graeme Taylor (vocals, guitar), Michael Gregory (drums), Roger Williams (trombone, tuba), Howard Evans (trumpet), Colin Rae (trumpet) and Malcolm Bennett (bass). The large group was somewhat unwieldy and complicated by other projects, including the fact that both Evans and Williams were also members of Brass Monkey. Rae soon left and the remaining members initially chose the name 'The First Eleven' and then switched to Home Service, which had both associations of Britishness/Englishness and of a bygone world in the defunct BBC Home Service radio station.

=== Early recordings ===
In 1982, two tracks from what was initially intended as a demo session were released as a single, "Doing The Inglish", with the B-side "Bramsley", designed to accompany the group's appearance at the Cambridge Folk Festival and their transmission on the BBC TV programme A Little Night Music. Bass player Malcolm Bennett then left the band to work as musical director of the National Theatre's production of Aeschylus' Oresteia and was replaced by Jon Davie. Further recording was delayed by their return to the National Theatre as a supporting band. Having been joined by keyboard player Steve King while recording, among considerable expectations, they released their eponymous first album in 1984. The album made good use of their two experienced songwriters, Tams and Caddick, and the arranging talents in the group for a mixture of original songs and traditional tunes. The result was favourably reviewed, but suffered in retrospect from the fragmented nature of the recording process among their busy schedules, leading to a lack of spontaneity.

Theatre productions continued to dominate the group's existence, particularly Brydon's trilogy based on the Wakefield cycle of mystery plays known as The Mysteries. Augmented by other musicians, including Linda Thompson on vocals and Andy Findon on saxophone, clarinet and flutes, they released a selection of the music as The Mysteries in 1985. Findon joined the band as a full member, but Bill Caddick, unhappy with the lack of live work, left the group soon after the end of the play's London run.

=== Alright Jack ===
With this line up the band began working on their third album, attempting to use their considerable talents to the full and overcome the problems that had limited their previous work. The result, Alright Jack (1985), was built around an arrangement of six folk songs by Percy Grainger. There were also three other traditional tunes, but the most striking element of the album were Tams' compositions, which bracketed the traditional material on both sides, including the title track, the apocalyptic and uplifting "Sorrow/Babylon" and the haunting "Scarecrow".

Alright Jack was the group's greatest achievement and almost their last. Tams left soon after and the remaining members gradually moved on to other projects.

=== Later work ===
They reunited, without Tams, in 1991 to contribute to the charity compilation All Through the Year and with Caddick toured the UK, recordings of which were released as Wild Life (1995), but they disbanded soon after.

In 2011, it was announced that Home Service were reuniting for live performances. The reunion was taking place to promote a forthcoming album of previously unheard live recordings from 1986.

In 2015, Tams retired from Home Service and was replaced by John Kirkpatrick as main singer. Kirkpatrick features as such on their first new album, A New Ground. Tams, however, returned for a triumphant appearance at Fairport's Cropredy Convention in August 2022, a performance which revisited and revitalised much of the material from the first two studio albums.

== Members ==
Current:

- John Kirkpatrick – vocals, melodeon, guitar
- Graeme Taylor – electric guitar
- Rob Levy – bass guitar
- Andy Findon – saxophone, clarinet and flutes
- Steve King – keyboards, vocals
- Michael Gregory – drums, percussion
- Paul Archibald – trumpet, flugelhorn
- Nigel Barr – trombone, tuba

Past:

- Bill Caddick – vocals, guitar
- Howard Evans – trumpet
- Malcolm Bennett – bass guitar
- Colin Rae – trumpet
- John Tams – vocals, guitar
- Jon Davie – bass guitar, vocals
- Roger Williams – trombone, tuba
- Rory McFarlane – bass guitar, vocals

== Discography ==
Studio albums:

- The Home Service (Jigsaw, 1984) (reissued on CD as Early Transmissions (Fledg'ling, 1996))
- The Mysteries (Coda, 1985)
- Alright Jack (Making Waves, 1986)
- A New Ground (Dotted Line, 2016)

Live albums:

- Wild Life (Fledg'ling, 1995)
- Live 1986 (Fledg'ling, 2011)

Collaborations:

- All Through the Year (Hokey Pokey Records, 1991) (with various artists)
