= The Mysteries =

Play

The Mysteries is a cycle of three medieval English mystery plays first presented at London's National Theatre in 1977 which tell a story of the Bible from Genesis to Revelation.

== Background ==
It is based largely on the Wakefield cycle of plays (but incorporating some scenes from the York, Chester and Coventry canons) and adapted by poet Tony Harrison, working with the original cast, into three parts: Nativity, The Passion and Doomsday. Directed by Bill Bryden, it was first performed on Easter Saturday 1977 on the terrace of the National Theatre building on the South Bank, London. It then went into the repertoire in the Cottesloe Theatre (part of the South Bank complex) until 20 April 1985 when the Cottesloe went 'dark'. Later in 1985 it transferred out of the National (produced by Iain Mackintosh and Richard Pilbrow) with a slightly different cast (Barrie Rutter played Herod and Pontius Pilate, and Barry Foster was Lucifer/Judas/Satan) to the Lyceum Theatre—then in use as a ballroom and as a promenade production.

Harrison's concept was to present the original stories as plays within plays, using as his characters the naïve but pious craftsmen and guild members, to some extent modernised to represent the trades of today—God, for example, created the world with the help of a real fork-lift truck— acting out the parts of the story that their mediaeval counterparts would have done. At the start of each performance actors dressed as tradesmen welcomed the audience.

The performance was a promenade one, with the audience mingling with the actors and making up the crowd at such scenes as the last judgement. The Evening Standard reported: "An extraordinary experience... no wonder the end of it all saw an explosion of communal joyousness with everybody, actors, musicians, and audience alike, cheering and clapping and singing and dancing."

== Cast ==
Actors in the productions included Brenda Blethyn, Kenneth Cranham, Edna Doré, Lynn Farleigh, Brian Glover (as God), Karl Johnson (as Jesus), Richard Johnson, Mark McManus, Eve Matheson (as Eve), Jack Shepherd and Robert Stephens (as Herod).

=== 1985 National Theatre ===
Nativity

Role	Actor
Abel	Karl Johnson
Abraham	Derek Newark
Adam / Isaac	Stephen Petcher
Angel Gabriel	Don Warrington
Cain	Robert Oates
Eve	Eve Matheson
God	Brian Glover
Herod	Robert Stephens
Herod’s Son	Anthony Trent
Joseph	Dave Hill
Lucifer	Jack Shepherd
Mak	Jim Carter
Mary	Brenda Blethyn
Mary	Dinah Stabb
Mrs Noah	Edna Doré
Noah	Howard Goorney
Percussion	Michael Gregory
Shepherd	Trevor Ray
Shepherd	John Tams
Wise Man	Christopher Gilbert
Wise Man	James Grant

Passion

Role	Actor
Angel Gabriel	Don Warrington
Annas	Anthony Trent
Barabas	Robert Oates
Blind Man	Stephen Petcher
Cayphas	Brian Glover
Disciple	David Busby
Disciple	Philip Langham
Jesus	Karl Johnson
John Baptist	Howard Goorney
Judas	Jack Shepherd
Mary Magdalene	Brenda Blethyn
Mary Magdalene	Dinah Stabb
Mary Mother	Edna Doré
Mary Salone	Eve Matheson
Percussion	Michael Gregory
Peter	James Grant
Pontius Pilate	Robert Stephens
Simon of Cyrene	Christopher Gilbert
Soldier 1	Derek Newark
Soldier 2	Trevor Ray
Soldier 3	Dave Hill
Soldier 4	Jim Carter
Thomas	John Tams

Doomsday

Role	Actor
Angel	David Busby
Angel	Philip Langham
Angel Gabriel	Don Warrington
Annas	Anthony Trent
Disciple	Christopher Gilbert
Disciple	Robert Oates
Eve	Eve Matheson
God	Brian Glover
John	Stephen Petcher
Jesus	Karl Johnson
Mary Magdalene	Brenda Blethyn
Mary Magdalene	Dinah Stabb
Mary Mother	Edna Doré
Paul	Howard Goorney
Peter	James Grant
Percussion	Michael Gregory
Pontius Pilate	Robert Stephens
Satan	Jack Shepherd
Soldier 1	Derek Newark
Soldier 2	Trevor Ray
Soldier 3	Dave Hill
Soldier 4	Jim Carter
Thomas	John Tams

The actor and musician John Tams and his Home Service band provided the folk music accompaniment and a selection of tracks from it was published on CD.

The 1985 Cottesloe version was filmed for Channel 4 Television. A revival of the cycle, again directed by Bryden and featuring some of the original cast, was chosen by the National Theatre to mark the millennium celebration in 2000.

== Awards ==
The productions won Bill Bryden the Best Director title in both the Evening Standard Theatre Awards and the Olivier Awards for 1985, the year the three plays first appeared together in performance at the Lyceum Theatre. Other awards were: Sydney Edwards Award for Best Director; Olivier for Designer of the Year for William Dudley; City Limits award for Best Director, and for Best Designer; Plays and Players for Best Director and Best Designer.

== Further reading and viewing ==
- Shepherd, Jack; Dewhurst, Keith (2006). Impossible Plays. London: Methuen. ISBN 0-413-77585-2.
- Harrison, Tony (1985). The Mysteries. London: Faber. ISBN 0-571-13790-3.
- 1985 Channel 4 recording of the Cottesloe Theatre performance on Youtube
