= The Albion Band =

British folk rock band

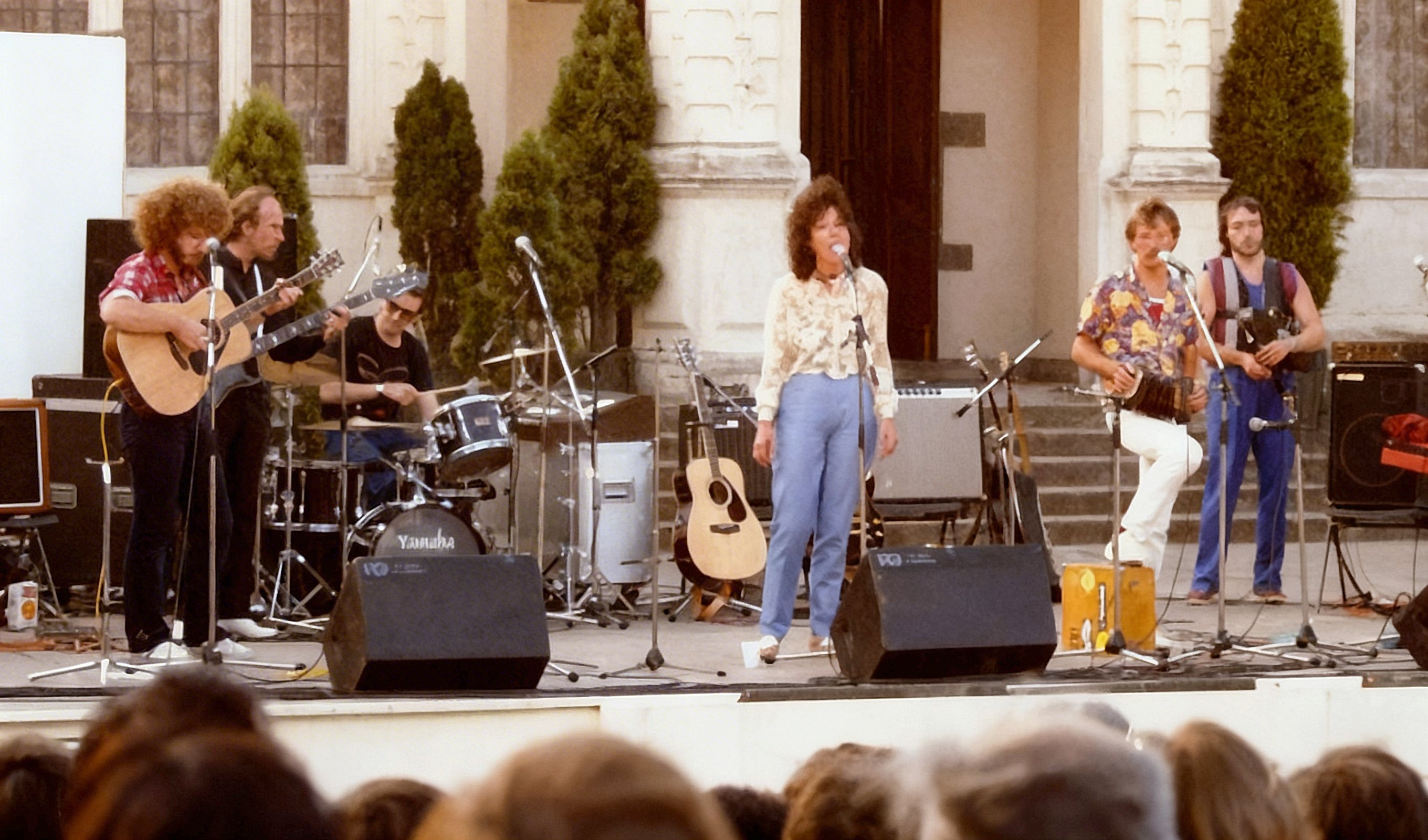
- The Albion Band in 1983, at Holland House, London (incarnation featuring Cathy Lesurf as lead vocalist)

Background information
- Also known as: The Albion Dance Band
- Origin: England
- Genres: British folk rock, folk
- Years active: The Albion Band: 1971–1973; 1976–2002; 2005–2008; 2011–2014; The Albion Christmas Band: 2005–present
- Spinoffs: Home Service
- Spinoff of: Fairport Convention; Steeleye Span
- Past members: See: Band members section
- Website: albionchristmas.co.uk

The Albion Band, also known as The Albion Country Band, The Albion Dance Band, and The Albion Christmas Band, is a British folk rock band, originally brought together and led by musician Ashley Hutchings. An important grouping in the genre, it has contained or been associated with a large proportion of major English folk performers in its long and fluid history.

The one constant in the band's history has been the band leader Ashley Hutchings, founding member of two other English folk rock groupings Fairport Convention and Steeleye Span, and it has been the home for most of the projects of his long career, though in the 2011 incarnation of the band he has handed over the reins to his son Blair Dunlop. This version continued until 2014.

Hutchings continues to perform in a separate Christmas-themed incarnation (occasionally featuring Dunlop) The Albion Christmas Band that was first established in 2005.

== History ==
=== Origins ===
Initially Hutchings formed the band in April 1971 to accompany his then wife the singer Shirley Collins on her No Roses album. Dave Mattacks, Richard Thompson and Simon Nicol (from Fairport Convention), Lal and Mike Waterson (of The Watersons) and Maddy Prior, were among twenty five credited backing musicians. On a short tour, core members were joined by Richard Thompson and his then wife Linda Thompson. Several members contributed with Hutchings to the project Morris On (1972), including John Kirkpatrick, Richard Thompson and Dave Mattacks, and cumbersomely all their names appeared on the album cover.

=== "Albion Country Band" performing line-ups (1972–1973) ===
Hutchings was keen to make a permanent band from these musicians and the first line-up (which debuted in June 1972) included Royston Wood, Steve Ashley, Sue Draheim, Simon Nicol and Dave Mattacks, but the group failed to gel and Wood, Steve Ashley and Draheim all departed in October 1972. No formal album was released by this line-up, however an instrumental "Four Hand Reel / St. Anne's Reel" recorded for the BBC "Top Gear" show on 19 June 1972 was released on the 1994 Ashley Hutchings retrospective The Guv'nor Vol 1, followed by 2 more tracks, "Morris Dance Tunes: Morris On / Jockey to the Fair / Room for the Cuckoo / Princess Royal / Morris Off" and the song "Rambling Sailor", both from the same Top Gear session, on The Guv'nor Vol 2 in 1975. A full band version of "Lord Bateman" with Steve Ashley on vocals, recorded with a temporarily reconvened original personnel in November 1972, was eventually included on the latter's debut solo album Stroll On in 1974.

Following this personnel change, Hutchings wished to recruit others including John Kirkpatrick and Sue Harris to the band but the latter two were unavailable until early 1973, so a "caretaker" band (Albion Country Band Mk 2) was put together to fulfil bookings that had already been arranged, comprising Hutchings with Richard Thompson and Linda Peters (later Thompson) as well as Simon Nicol and (on occasion) Shirley Collins, with either Mattacks or Roger Swallow on drums. This incarnation of the band never formally recorded but a number of audience tapes recorded between August and December 1972 survive (mainly accessible here) which show the band not surprisingly leaning heavily upon a number of either recently released, or soon to be released Thompson originals performed in an electric context.

Early in 1973 the final "Mk 3" Albion Country Band line-up came together which comprised Hutchings with Martin Carthy, Kirkpatrick, Harris, Simon Nicol and Roger Swallow on drums. In this incarnation the band played dates in England and in Europe (including the Enschede Folk Festival in the Netherlands in June 1973) and recorded the tracks for an album Battle of the Field, however split up in August 1973; with no touring band to promote it, the album was shelved for several years by the record label before being eventually released on Island Records's mid-price "HELP" label in 1976. Other material recorded by this line-up (4 tracks recorded on 9 May 1973 for the Bob Harris radio show) eventually appeared on the later BBC Sessions CD (1998), with one of the same also previewed earlier on The Guv'nor Vol 3 in 1995.

=== The Albion Dance Band ===
From 1974 to 1975, Hutchings abandoned the Albion name and focused on forming the Etchingham Steam Band with his wife Shirley Collins. However, in 1976 he pulled together a new Albion Band, this time with the aim of playing traditional dance music. It had a huge and unstable membership that included Simon Nicol, Graeme Taylor from Gryphon, the early musicians Phil Pickett and John Sothcott, fiddle player Ric Sanders, plus John Tams, one of folk music's most distinctive and highly regarded vocalists. The immediate result was a lively traditional based album The Prospect Before Us under the name The Albion Dance Band. In 1978 they shortened the name to The Albion Band (which has remained the basis of the group's identity since) and released, under Tams' direction, what is usually considered the finest album in the long history of the band Rise Up Like the Sun (1978).

=== Shows ===
The band took part in a 1977 TV show Here We Come A-Wassailing and in 1978–9 collaborated with playwright Keith Dewhurst for a stage adaptation of British author Flora Thompson's Lark Rise to Candleford, tracks from which were released as an album in 1980. In fact, while one line up of the band was working on the latter project at the National Theatre, Hutchings took a different line up on the road for a UK tour in the early summer of 1979. That version of The Albion Band featured Melanie Harrold on acoustic guitar and vocals, Barry Dransfield on fiddle, dulcimer and vocals, Ashley Hutchings on bass, Dave Mattacks on drums, Martin Simpson on guitar and banjo, and two electric guitarists, Andy Roberts and Doug Morter. The Albion Band was probably at the height of its mainstream profile at this point, with the single "Poor Old Horse" (a track from Rise Up Like the Sun) being selected as a "Record of the Week" on BBC Radio 1 and the band getting its own BBC Arena documentary that explored their work. While Hutchings was more interested in pursuing theatrical possibilities, many members of the band wanted to be a touring and recording band and, despite critical acclaim, this line-up split. Tams, Taylor and Gregory went on to form the nucleus of Home Service. Live material from this period has been released in Songs from the Shows (1997 and 1999) and The Guvnor, Vols 1–4 (1996–2004).

=== Reformation and stability (1980–1990) ===
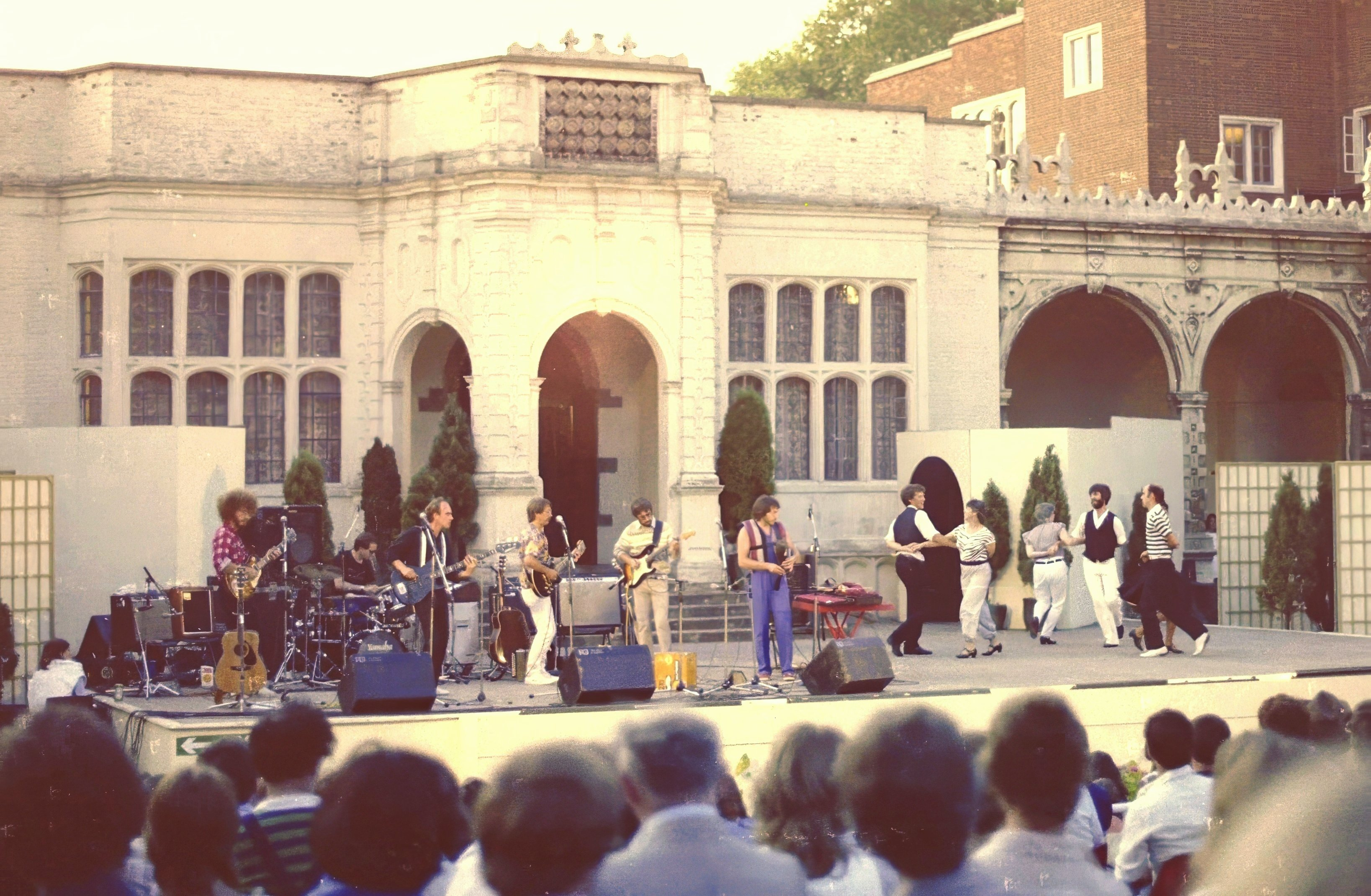
The band at Holland House, London, July 1983; L-R: Alan Prosser, guitar; Dave Mattacks, drums; Ashley Hutchings, bass; Dave Whetstone, guitar; unknown guitarist; Jean-Pierre Rasle, bagpipes; plus dancers

Hutchings reformed the band around the nucleus of the remaining ex-Fairporters Nicol and Mattacks. He added three members of Cock and Bull (Dave Whetstone, Jean-Pierre Rasle and John Maxwell) and for the first time on record, opted for a lead female vocalist in Cathy Lesurf of the Oyster Band, whose tones characterize most recordings from this era. An album from this relatively stable period was Light Shining (1983), on which most of the tracks were original material. However, the reputation of the album has since been marred by accusations that Hutchings plagiarized one of its songs, "Wolfe," from "Northwest Passage" by Canadian folksinger Stan Rogers.

Shuffle Off (1983) followed, after which Nicol and Mattacks left to reform Fairport Convention. Phil Beer on guitar/fiddle/vocals, Doug Morter on guitar/vocals and Trevor Foster on drums joined the band, and Under the Rose (1984), A Christmas Present From The Albion Band (1985) and The Wild Side of Town (1987) followed, the last of which was based on a five-part BBC television series presented by Chris Baines. The line-up then shifted with Martin Bell joining on violin before the release of Stella Maris in (1987). Martin Bell and Cathy Lesurf then left and the group were joined by Simon Care and John Shepherd. This was the most stable lineup in the band's history in terms of albums, producing three: I Got New Shoes (1988), Give Me a Saddle and I'll Trade you a Car (1989) and 1990 in the year of that name.

=== Acoustic period (1990–97) ===
In 1990 they were joined by singer-songwriter and instrumentalist Julie Matthews, but although they toured they produced no albums before her departure in 1993. Some sessions from this line-up surfaced as Captured in 1995. Trevor Foster and Phil Beer left and were temporarily replaced by virtuoso acoustic guitarist Keith Hinchliffe shifting the emphasis away from electric instruments. In 1993 Hutchings decided to follow this trend turning the band into a small four piece unit comprising himself, Julie Matthews' replacement Chris While, original member Simon Nicol, and Ashley Reed on violin. This allowed them to play small folk club, pub and college venues and gave the Band a whole new direction, now drawing on contemporary songwriters like Beth Nielsen Chapman and Steve Knightley as well as the internal songwriting talent of While and Hutchings. The first studio album of this period Acousticity (1993) had a more lively and contemporary feel, aided by Reed's energetic playing.

In 1995 Reed left and Matthews returned to the band to add her vocal, instrumental and songwriting talents. The resulting album, Albion Heart (1995), is usually considered the best of this later period and marked the beginning of While and Matthews' long and productive partnership. It was also unusual for the lack of traditional folk instruments and the four were soon joined by violinist and mandolin player Chris Leslie for the last recording of this era Demi Paradise (1996), before Leslie left for Fairport Convention and While and Matthews for solo and joint projects. Live performances of this era have been released as Acousticity on Tour (2004) and Albion Heart on Tour (2004).

=== Multi-generational phase (1997–2002) ===
The last phase of the full band would be based around a return to a more traditional rock format and the incorporation of two generations of musicians. Hutchings called in experienced guitarist and writer Ken Nicol and added newcomers Joe Broughton on fiddle and Neil Marshall on drums. Female vocals were supplied by Kellie While and Gillie Nicholls, who were guests on the first studio album of this era, Happy Accident (1998). Gillie Nicolls was a full member of the band for the second outing Before Us Stands Yesterday (1999), but was then replaced by Kellie While for the recording of The Christmas Album later that year and for Road Movies (2001), their last studio project. Ken Nicol left to be replaced by Pete Zorn, but it was becoming increasingly hard to find venues of a suitable size and in 2002 it was decided to suspend the band.

Their 1999 album Ridgeriders also saw them reunite with former members of the band.

=== Albion Christmas ===
While Hutchings continued to pursue other projects he revived the Albion Band in an acoustic format for seasonal tours in 2005, allowing them to play smaller venues which could usually be easily filled. The line-up is based around Simon Nicol, Kellie While and multi-instrumentalist Simon Care. The results have been three further seasonal albums: An Albion Christmas (2005), Winter Songs (2006), and Snow on Snow (2008). A fourth album Traditional (2009) is a compilation of tracks from the preceding three which excludes spoken word recordings.

=== The Albion Band reborn ===
In July 2011, Hutchings announced that the Albion Band would be forming again, and for the first time he himself would not be a member. Instead he passed the baton to his son – the guitarist and singer Blair Dunlop. This new line-up also features a number of other current folk performers from a range of backgrounds reflecting earlier versions of the Albion Band. These members include Folk Award nominee Katriona Gilmore (Tiny Tin Lady, Gilmore/Roberts) on fiddle and vocals, vocalist, concertina player and guitarist Gavin Davenport (Crucible, Glorystrokes, Hekety), drummer Tom Wright (Eliza Carthy projects/Glorystrokes), and Tim Yates (Blackbeard's Tea Party/The QP) on bass – only the second bass player in the band's history, and lead guitarist and relative newcomer Benjamin Trott. This line-up released an own label EP Fighting Room in 2011 and their first studio album Vice of the People in 2012.

On 10 January 2014, Dunlop announced the friendly dissolution of the band "in the current incarnation", to allow its members to pursue individual projects. In his letter, he stated that they will undoubtedly work together in the future.

While the primary Albion Band is no longer active, the Albion Christmas Band (still featuring Ashley Hutchings, Simon Nicol, Simon Care and Kellie While, with occasional appearances by Blair Dunlop) continues to release new albums, and mounts annual UK tours in November and December.

== Band members ==
Current members (The Albion Christmas Band)

- Simon Care – concertina, melodeon (1988–1992, 2003-)
- Ashley Hutchings – bass guitar, vocals (1971–)
- Simon Nicol – vocals, guitar (1971–1978, 1982–1983, 1993–1996, 2003-)
- Kellie While – vocals, guitar (1999–)

Past members

- Steve Ashley – vocals, guitar, harmonica, whistle, (1972)
- Francis Baines – hurdy-gurdy (1971)
- Phil Beer – vocals, guitar, mandolin, violin (1984–1991)
- Martin Bell – vocals, violin, synthesizer (1986–1987)
- Dave Bland – concertina (1971)
- Joe Broughton – violin (1997–2002)
- Pete Bullock – piano, synthesizer, saxophone, clarinet (1977–1981)
- Bill Caddick – vocals, triangle (1979–1981, died 2018)
- Martin Carthy – vocals, guitar (1973, 1978–1980)
- Alan Cave – bassoon (1971)
- Dolly Collins – piano (1971; died 1995)
- Shirley Collins – vocals (1971, 1976–1977, 1978–1980)
- Lol Coxhill – saxophone (1971; died 2012)
- Trevor Crozier – Jew's harp (1971)
- Sue Draheim – violin (1972; died 2013)
- Barry Dransfield – violin, dulcimer, vocals (1971, 1979; died 2026)
- Howard Evans – trumpet (1978–1981; died 2006)
- Trevor Foster – drums (1983–1991)
- Michael Gregory – drums (1976–1981)
- Tony Hall – melodeon (1971)
- Sue Harris – oboe, hammered dulcimer, vocals (1973)
- Melanie Harrold – flute organ, guitar, vocals (1979)
- Keith Hinchcliffe – guitar (1992)
- Eric Hine – keyboards (1987)
- Nic Jones – violin (1971)
- John Kirkpatrick – vocals, concertina, melodeon, accordion (1971, 1973, 1979–1980)
- Chris Leslie – vocals, violin (1995–1996)
- Cathy Lesurf – vocals (1982–1988)
- Alan Lumsden – ophicleide (1971)
- Neil Marshall – drums (1998–2002)
- Dave Mattacks – drums, keyboards (1971–1972, 1976–1978, 1979, 1983)
- Julie Matthews – vocals, keyboards, guitar (1991–1992, 1995–1997)
- John Maxwell – vocals, drums, percussion (1982–1983; died 2001)
- Steve Migden – French horn (1971)
- Doug Morter – guitar, vocals (1979–1980, 1983–1985)
- Gillie Nicholls – vocals, guitar (1998–1999)
- Ken Nicol – vocals, guitar (1998–2002)
- Philip Pickett – recorder, shawm, crumhorn, bagpipes (1976–1979)
- Roger Powell – drums (1971)
- Maddy Prior – vocals (1971)
- Brian Protheroe – keyboards, vocals (1979–1981)
- Jean-Pierre Rasle – recorder, crumhorn, bagpipes (1982–1983)
- Ashley Reed – violin, vocals (1993–1994)
- Tim Renwick – guitar (1971)
- Andy Roberts – electric guitar, vocals (1979)
- John Rodd – concertina (1976–1977)
- Colin Ross – northumbrian small pipes (1971; died 2019)
- Ric Sanders – violin (1977–1979)
- Steve Saunders – trombone (1979–1980)
- John Shepherd – keyboards (1988–1990)
- Martin Simpson – banjo, guitar, vocals (1979–1980)
- John Sothcott – vielle, crumhorn, citole (1976–1977)
- Roger Swallow – drums (1972–1973)
- John Tams – vocals, melodeon (1976–1981)
- Graeme Taylor – guitar (1976–1981)
- Linda Thompson – vocals (1972)
- Richard Thompson – guitar (1971, 1972)
- Eddie Upton – vocals, caller (1976–1977)
- John Watcham – concertina (1972, with the Albion Morris Men)
- Lal Waterson – vocals (1971; died 1998)
- Mike Waterson – vocals (1971; died 2011)
- Dave Whetstone – vocals, concertina, melodeon, guitar (1982–1984)
- Chris While – vocals, guitar (1993–1997)
- Ian Whiteman – piano (1971)
- Royston Wood – vocals, concertina, percussion (1971, 1972; died 1990)
- Pete Zorn – saxophone, vocals (2001–2002; died 2016)

== Discography ==
=== Singles ===
- "Hopping Down in Kent" b/w "Merry Sherwood Rangers" (Harvest HAR 5113, 3 Sep 1976)
- "The Postman's Knock" b/w "La Sexte Estampie Real" (Harvest HAR 5128, 1977)
- "Poor Old Horse" b/w "Ragged Heroes" (Harvest HAR 5156, 1978)
- "Pain and Paradise" b/w "Lay Me Low" (Harvest HAR 5175, 1979)
- "Wings" (1998)

=== Albums ===
As the Albion Country Band

- No Roses (Pegasus PEG-7, 1971) with Shirley Collins
- Battle of the Field (Island Records HELP 25, 1976)

As the Albion Dance Band

- The Prospect Before Us (Harvest SHSP 4059, 1977)
- Shuffle Off (Spindrift Records SPIN 103, 1983)
- I Got New Shoes (Making Waves SPIN 132, 1987)
- Dancing Days Are Here Again (Talking Elephant, 2007)
- Rockin' Barn Dance (Talking Elephant, 2009)

As the Albion Band

- Rise Up Like the Sun (Harvest SHSP 4092, 1978)
- Lark Rise to Candleford (Charisma CDS 4020, 1980) (credited to Keith Dewhurst & The Albion Band; "Various Artists" on the record label)
- Light Shining (Albino ALB 001, 1983)
- Under The Rose (Spindrift Records SPIN 110, 1984)
- A Christmas Present from the Albion Band (Fun/Tracer, 1985)
- Stella Maris (Making Waves SPIN 130, 1987)
- The Wild Side of Town (Celtic Music CM 042, 1987) – with Chris Baines
- Give Me A Saddle, I'll Trade You A Car (Topic 12TS454, 1989)
- 1990 (Topic 12TS457, 1990)
- Songs from the Shows, v. 1 (Albino, 1990)
- Songs from the Shows, v. 2 (Albino, 1991)
- Live in Concert (BBC, 1993)
- Acousticity (HTD/Transatlantic, 1993)
- Captured (HTD, 1995)
- Albion Heart (Making Waves, 1995)
- Demi Paradise (HTD, 1996)
- Live At The Cambridge Folk Festival (BBC/Strange Fruit, 1996)
- The Acoustic Years: 1993–1997 (Castle, 1997)
- Songs From The Shows (Road Goes On Forever, 1997)
- Happy Accident (HTD/Transatlantic, 1998)
- The BBC Sessions (BBC/Strange Fruit, 1998)
- Along The Pilgrim's Way (Mooncrest, 1998)
- The Best of 89/90 (HTD 1998)
- Albion Sunrise—HTD Recordings: 1994–1999 (HTD, 1999)
- Albion Heart (HTD 1999)
- Before Us Stands Yesterday (HTD, 1999)
- Christmas Album (HTD, 1999)
- The HTD Years (HTD, 2000)
- Road Movies (Topic, 2001)
- An Evening with The Albion Band (Talking Elephant, 2002)
- No Surrender (Snapper Music, 2003)
- Acousticity on Tour (Talking Elephant, 2004)
- Albion Heart on Tour (Talking Elephant, 2004)
- Albion Sunrise – HTD Recordings: 1994–1999 (HTD, 2004)
- The Albion Band Live in Concert (Talking Elephant, 2007)
- Vintage Albion Band (Talking Elephant, 2007)
- Natural and Wild (Talking Elephant, 2009)
- Vintage II On The Road 1972–1980 (Talking Elephant, 2010)
- Another Christmas Present (Talking Elephant, 2010)
- Fighting Room (own label, 2011)
- Vice of the People (Powered Flight Music, 2012)

As the Albion Christmas Band (Ashley Hutchings, Simon Nicol, Simon Care, Kellie While)

- An Albion Christmas (Talking Elephant, 2003)
- Winter Songs (Talking Elephant, 2006)
- Snow On Snow (Talking Elephant, 2008)
- Traditional (Talking Elephant, 2009) compilation of tracks from the previous three albums, excluding spoken word recordings
- A Sound In The Frosty Air (Rooksmere Records, 2011)
- One For The Road (Rooksmere Records, 2014)
- Magic Touch (Talking Elephant, 2016)
- All Are Safely Gathered In (Talking Elephant, 2022)

Other names

- Yuletracks (1986)
- Ridgeriders (1999) the album's band name includes the list of the performers separately, as well as saying with The Albion Band and Julie Matthews

Contributing artist

- Steve Ashley – Stroll On (Gull Records, 1974) – performing on Lord Bateman
- The Rough Guide to English Roots Music (World Music Network 1998)

== DVDs ==
- In Search of English Folk Song (1997 BBC film directed by Ken Russell) featuring Fairport Convention, Donovan, Osibisa, Eliza Carthy, The Albion Band, Waterson–Carthy and Edward II. Reissued on DVD in 2008, but for Region 1 only
