= John Tams =

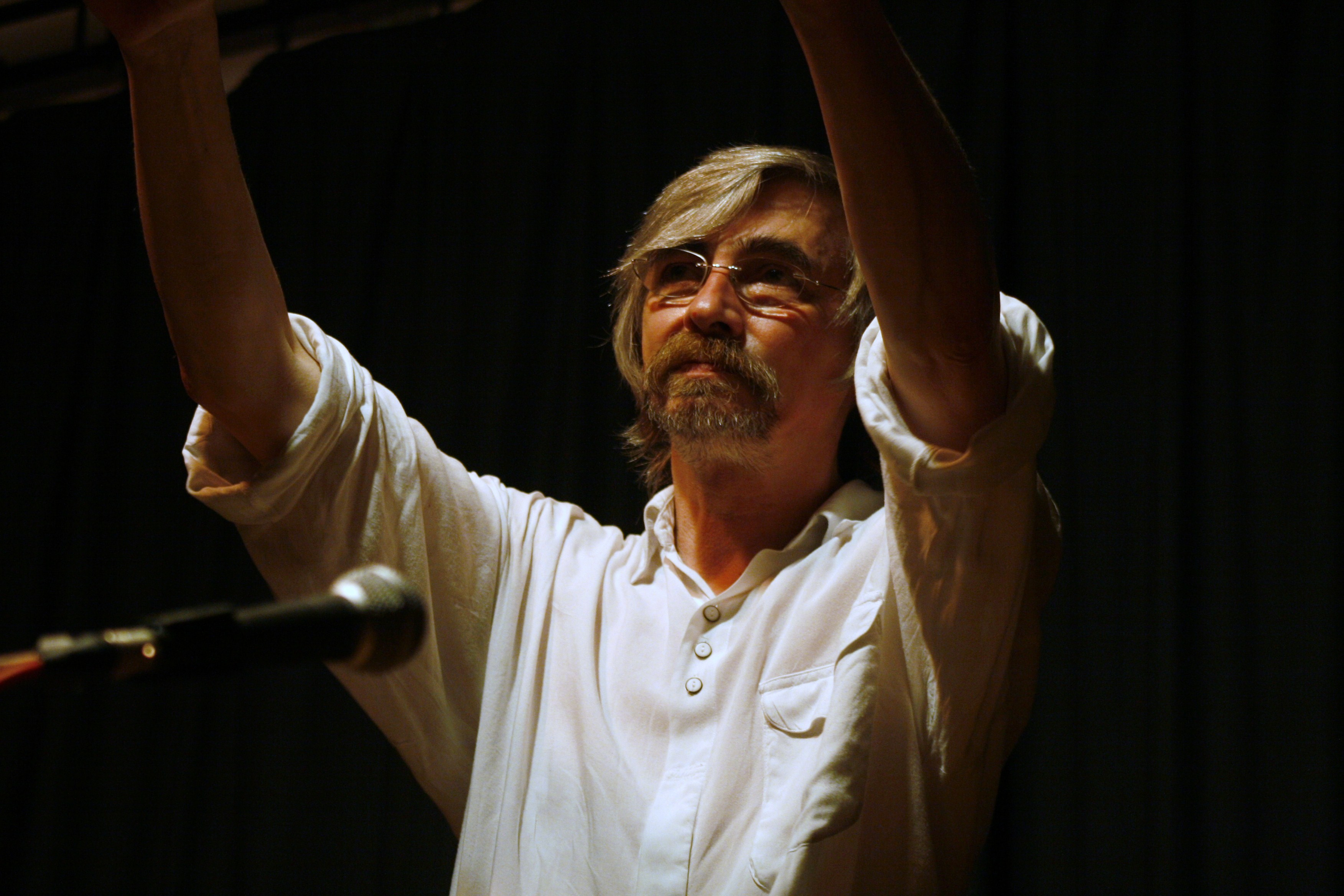

Background information
- Born: 16 February 1949 (age 77); Holbrook, Derbyshire, England
- Genre: Folk
- Occupation: Actor/singer
- Instruments: Guitar, Melodeon
- Years active: 1970s–present
- Website: www.johntams.co.uk

John Tams (born 16 February 1949) is an English actor, singer, songwriter, composer and musician born in Holbrook, Derbyshire, the son of a publican. He first worked as a reporter for the Ripley & Heanor News later working for BBC Radio Derby and BBC Radio Nottingham. Tams had an early part in the BBC serialisation of D. H. Lawrence's The Rainbow (1988), and may be best known for playing a regular supporting role in the ITV drama series Sharpe, as rifleman Daniel Hagman. He also co-wrote the music for each film alongside Dominic Muldowney.

Tams was a member of Derbyshire folk group Muckram Wakes in the 1970s, then worked with Ashley Hutchings as singer and melodeon-player on albums including Son of Morris On, and as a member of the British folk rock group Albion Band. Splitting with Hutchings in the 1980s, he formed Home Service. In the following decades, Tams spent time fronting Home Service (Best Live Act at the BBC Folk Awards 2012) or in a duo with Barry Coope (Duo of the Year 2008). In 2015 it was announced that Tams was retiring from Home Service.

== Early life ==
Tams was born in Holbrook, Derbyshire, the son of a publican. There was a strong musical background in his family and by the age of eleven he was playing the E flat horn in Riddings Brass Band, and began playing the guitar in his teens.

Tams left school at 15 without any qualifications and went to Chesterfield Technical College where he spent two years on a GCE course, concentrating on the arts. He first worked as a reporter for the Ripley and Heanor News, and then as an editor on the Belper News – where he notably interviewed the then deputy prime minister George Brown – and for the Alfreton Observer. He also worked for BBC Radio Derby and BBC Radio Nottingham, and as a freelance reporter for the Melody Maker and the New Musical Express.

== Folk musician ==
Tams was a member of Derbyshire folk group Muckram Wakes in the 1970s, then worked with Ashley Hutchings as singer and melodeon-player on albums including Son of Morris On, and as a member of the British folk rock group Albion Band. Splitting with Hutchings in the 1980s, he formed Home Service. In the following decades, Tams spent time fronting Home Service (Best Live Act at the BBC Folk Awards 2012) or in a duo with Barry Coope (Duo of the Year 2008). In 2015 it was announced that Tams was retiring from Home Service.

He spent many years working at the National Theatre as a music director and as an actor. He appeared in the ITV series Sharpe as Chosen Man Daniel Hagman for five years, and co-wrote the music with Dominic Muldowney. In December 2009, Tams released a single of "Love Farewell" with the Band and Bugles of the Rifles. The recording of this song, dating from the Peninsular War, was for the benefit of Help for Heroes, a charity dedicated to supporting injured British service personnel and their families. He is recipient of many awards and honours including six BBC Radio 2 Folk Awards; he has been nominated for an Olivier Award for War Horse and was part of the creative team that won Best Play at the Tonys on Broadway. He has been awarded Honorary Doctorates from the University of Sheffield Hallam and Derby. He is currently working on Jericho for ITV as both an actor and with music. He is regarded by many as one of the unsung heroes of folk music. His song "Rolling Home" is sung across the world. In 2012 he performed at Horse Guards for members of the British royal family singing "Only Remembered," and the next year he sang to an estimated television audience of 53 million when he performed "Only Remembered" to the Queen, the Royal Family, Heads of State, serving and retired soldiers and their families at the Royal Festival of Remembrance live from the Royal Albert Hall.

== Collector and stage actor ==
In 1974, Tams and Neil Wayne went to County Clare to make field recordings of highly regarded traditional players of the concertina. The recordings were issued on the "Free Reed" label in the 1970s. These recordings then became very scarce until 2007 when all the tracks were issued as a 6-CD set called The Clare Set.

Tams was a musical director and actor at the National Theatre from 1976 to 1985 and then again from 1999 to 2001, working on such shows as The Mysteries, Lark Rise to Candleford, Glengarry Glenross, The Crucible, Golden Boy, The Good Hope and The Mysteries Revival in 1999. He was a member of the creative team headed by Bill Bryden.

He also worked as a music consultant at Shakespeare's Globe on Holding Fire (opened July 2007), and collaborated with Adrian Sutton on the music for War Horse (opened October 2007) at the National Theatre. War Horse has been described as the most successful show ever staged by the National and has resulted in several awards. It received six nominations for the Olivier Awards, including one for the Best Sound, for Tams and fellow team members Chris Shutt and Adrian Sutton.

== Television actor ==
Tams had an early part in The Rainbow (1988), and may be best known for playing a regular supporting role in the ITV drama series Sharpe, as rifleman Daniel Hagman, one of the "Chosen Men" in the 95th Rifles – a whimsical, sober, former poacher always ready with a deadly eye behind a Baker rifle, a folk remedy for an ailment or a song for a weary heart. He also co-wrote the music for each film (18, as of November 2008) alongside Dominic Muldowney.

In 1996, Tams and Muldowney released the best-selling album Over the Hills & Far Away: The Music of Sharpe to accompany the series. This album has sold over 120,000 copies.

== Solo singer ==
Tams has released three solo albums to date, Unity (2000), Home (2002) and The Reckoning (2005); all of which have met with critical acclaim. At the 2006 BBC Radio 2 Folk Awards, Tams won Best Album for The Reckoning, Best Traditional Track (for Bitter Withy) and Folk Singer of the Year. Tams is the only artist to have won the Album of the Year award twice, the first time was with his first solo album Unity in 2001. At the BBC Radio 2 Folk Awards 2008 he and singing partner Barry Coope were presented with the prestigious Best Duo award from actor Sean Bean, alongside whom he acted in the Sharpe TV series. Tams has now received ten nominations, resulting in six BBC Radio 2 Folk Awards.

The book accompanying the Topic Records 70th anniversary boxed-set Three Score and Ten lists Unity as one of its classic albums, and two of Tams's tracks appear in the collection: Bitter Withy from The Reckoning is track 16 on the first CD; and Unity (Raise Your Banners High) from Unity is track one on the fifth CD.

== Radio producer ==
In 2006 Tams became musical director of the BBC Radio 2 2006 Radio Ballads, an updating of Ewan MacColl's Radio Ballads. The series was short-listed for two Sony Radio Awards in 2007. In the event it won a Sony Gold Radio Academy Award for Song of Steel and a Bronze award for Thirty Years of Conflict. It has been nominated for a Clarion Award. The song Steelos, written by Tams for the Song of Steel episode of the 2006 Ballads, was nominated Best Original Song at the 2006 Radio 2 Folk Awards. Currently, Tams is also working on a stage version of Steelos to be performed at the Magna Centre in the Rother Valley in 2009. He worked on John McCusker's commission 'Under One Sky' alongside Graham Coxon, Roddy Woomble, Julie Fowlis and others.

In November 2007 Tams was awarded an Honorary Doctorate from Sheffield Hallam University, then in January 2009 another Honorary Doctorate from Derby University.

In November 2015 Tams was presented with a Gold Badge from the English Folk Dance and Song Society (EFDSS).

== Personal life ==
Tams is married to Sally Ward, a Derbyshire funeral celebrant.

== Discography ==
with Muckram Wakes

- A Map of Derbyshire (1973)

with the Albion Band

- The Prospect Before Us (1977)
- Rise Up Like the Sun (1978)
- Lark Rise to Candleford (1980)
- 1990 (1990) (guest appearance; backing vocals on "Nameless Kind of Hell" and co-lead/duet vocals on "The Party's Over")
- Live in Concert (1993) (tracks 1 - 7, recorded 1977)
- Live at the Cambridge Folk Festival (1998) (tracks 1 - 6, recorded 1977)
- The BBC Sessions (1998) (tracks 9 - 12, recorded 1977 + tracks 13 - 16, recorded 1978)
- Another Christmas Present from the Albion Band (2010) (recorded 1986) (guest performer)

with Home Service

- Home Service (1984) (reissued as Early Transmissions, 1996)
- Mysteries (1985)
- Alright Jack (1986)
- Live 1986 (2011)

Solo albums

- Unity (2000)
- Home (2002)
- The Reckoning (2005)

Soundtracks

- Over the Hills & Far Away: The Music of Sharpe (1996) (with Dominic Muldowney)
- War Horse: Original music and songs from the National Theatre production (2008) (with Adrian Sutton and Tim Van Eyken)

Compilations

- The Definitive Collection (2007)
