= Philip Pickett =

English musician (born 1950)

- Born: Philip John Pickett; 17 November 1950 (age 75); London
- Education: Marling School, Stroud, Gloucestershire
- Alma mater: Guildhall School of Music and Drama, London
- Occupations: Musician, recorder player
- Known for: Early music ensembles
- Criminal charges: Rape and sexual assault
- Criminal penalty: 11 years in prison
- Criminal status: Guilty, detained in prison

Philip Pickett (born 17 November 1950) is an English musician. Pickett was director of early music ensembles including the New London Consort, and taught at the Guildhall School of Music and Drama. He played recorders, shawms and similar instruments. In February 2015, Pickett received an 11-year prison sentence for the rape and sexual assault of pupils at the school.

== Early life ==
Born in London but raised in Gloucestershire, he began playing the trumpet while a student at Marling School, Stroud. There he met Antony Baines and David Munrow, who encouraged him to try early woodwind instruments such as the recorder, shawm and rackett. He studied at the Guildhall School of Music and Drama. Pickett was forced to give up the trumpet after being kicked in the mouth while being assaulted on the London Underground at the end of his first year.

== Career ==
Pickett played for the Academy of St Martin in the Fields, the English Concert, the English Chamber Orchestra and the London Mozart Players. In 1976 he joined the Albion Band, a folk-rock band led by Ashley Hutchings that included John Sothcott. They played a mixture of traditional folk music and medieval tunes on a wide range of instruments – curtals, shawms, recorders, crumhorns, bagpipes, rackets, chalumeaux and synthesiser. In 1988 Pickett released his only solo album, called The Alchemist. A collaboration with Richard Thompson and members of Fairport Convention in 1998 resulted in the release of The Bones of All Men, consisting of early music tunes with a modern rock rhythm section and electric guitar.

In 1993 he became artistic director of the Purcell Room Early Music series, and in the same year was appointed director of Early Music at Shakespeare's Globe Theatre. The Musicians of the Globe ensemble specialised in English music from the 16th and 17th centuries. Pickett simultaneously led the New London Consort, which had a wider repertoire covering English, Spanish, Italian and German medieval and Renaissance music. From 1994 to 1997 he was founder and director of the Aldeburgh Early Music Festival.

Pickett taught freelance, mainly at the Guildhall School of Music and Drama, London, from 1972 to 1997. His time at Guildhall later came under scrutiny after his 2013 arrest.

== Sexual abuse conviction ==
After the revelations in 2012–13 of the Jimmy Savile sexual abuse scandal, a former student was referred by Suffolk Police to the specialist investigation team within the City of London Police. The woman, who was 16 in 1978, later testified that during a lesson Pickett told her to take her top off and lie down in a darkened practice room to "improve her breathing", on later occasions sexually assaulting and raping her. Police arrested Pickett on 4 December 2013, after which further victims came forward. His arrest was not part of the high-profile sex crime investigation Operation Yewtree. It was said at his trial that allegations against Pickett dated back to 1984, when a family complained to the school about him attacking their 17-year-old daughter; they were allegedly told by the school that she should have her lessons elsewhere as no one else had complained. Police discovered evidence within the archives of the school that in 1984 the principal John Hosier had written to Pickett, asking him to discuss the allegations. Hosier passed police a letter regarding the allegations and his frustrations, but the following year the Guildhall School made Pickett a fellow.

On 10 February 2015 Pickett was found guilty of two rapes and two indecent assaults carried out in soundproof rooms at the Guildhall School between 1979 and 1983. After his conviction, Pickett's defence team tried to delay sentencing to accommodate Pickett's commitment to arrange three music festivals. Judge Charles Wide sentenced Pickett on 20 February 2015 to a total of 11 years, and ordered that two further indictments in relation to allegations by two women dating back to the 1970s lie on file. Pickett was cleared of six further counts of indecent assault.

== Discography ==
=== With the Albion Band ===
Albums

- Dancing Days Are Here Again (2007, recorded 1976)
- The Prospect Before Us (1977)
- Rise up Like The Sun (1978)
- The BBC Sessions (1998, recorded 1973–1978)
- Stella Maris (1987)

Singles

- "Hopping Down in Kent"/"Merry Sherwood Rangers" (1976)
- "The Postman's Knock"/"La Sexte Estampie Real" (1977)
- "Poor Old Horse"/"Ragged Heroes" (1978)
- "Pain and Paradise"/"Lay Me Low" (1979)

=== With the New London Consort ===
- Elizabeth and Jacobean Concert
- Music from the Time of Columbus
- Ars Subtilior
- Llibre Vermell
- Biber and Schmelzer Trumpet Music
- Biber Requiem
- O Primavera
- Trionfi
- Las Ensaladas
- Mad Songs
- The Songs of Oswald von Wolkenstein
- Telemann Concertos
- Pilgrimage to Santiago
- Monteverdi Vespers (1610)
- L'Orfeo
- Tielman Susato, Dansereye 1551, Éditions de l'Oiseau-Lyre, 1993
- Anonymous, Carmina Burana, Vols. 1–4 (L'Oiseau Lyre, 4 CD, 1994)
- John Blow: Venus & Adonis, A Masque for the entertainment of the King, 1994)
- Sinners and Saints (a compilation of previous recordings)
- Bach: Brandenburg Concerti (complete)
- The Feast of Fools
- Praetorius: Dances from Terpsichore
- Vivaldi: Gloria RV 588 and Dixit Dominus RV 595
- The Sylvan and Oceanic Delights of Posilipo
- Michael Praetorius, Nativitas – A Renaissance Christmas, Decca, 1 CD, 1998

=== With the Musicians of the Globe ===
- Music From Shakespeare's Plays
- Ben Jonson's 'The Masque Of Oberon'
- A Shakespeare Ode On The Witches and Fairies
- Purcell's Shakespeare
- The Enchanted Island
- Nutmegs and Ginger
- Sir Henry Rowley Bishop: Songs for Shakespeare productions at Covent Garden

=== Solo ===
- The Alchemist (1988) (London NL 425 209–2)
- The Alchemist (1998)

=== With Richard Thompson ===
- Rumor and Sigh (1991)
- The Bones of All Men (1998)
