= The Guv'nor =

The Guv'nor may refer to:

- The Guv'nor (film), a 1935 film starring George Arliss
- "the Guv'nor", nickname of footballer Diego Costa
- "the Guv'nor", nickname of cricketer Bobby Abel
- "the Guv'nor", nickname of former footballer and manager Paul Ince
- "the Guv'nor", nickname of Lenny McLean, bareknuckle boxer, criminal, author, and actor
- "Guv'nor" a song by JJ Doom from the album Key to the Kuffs
- a series of albums by Ashley Hutchings, including:
  - The Guv'nor vol 1
  - The Guv'nor vol 2
  - The Guv'nor vol 3
  - The Guv'nor vol 4
- A popular 1980's overdrive guitar pedal from Marshall Amplification.

== See also ==
- Guv'ner
- The Guvnors
