= Morris On =

Studio album by Ashley Hutchings and others
- Released: 1972
- Genre: Folk music
- Length: 36:38
- Label: Island
- Producer: John Wood

Ashley Hutchings and others chronology
Morris On (1972)	Son of Morris On (1976)

Professional ratings
Review scores
Source	Rating
Allmusic	4/5 stars

Morris On is a folk/rock album released in 1972 under the joint names of Ashley Hutchings, Richard Thompson, Dave Mattacks, John Kirkpatrick and Barry Dransfield. Like the subsequent "Descendant Of" Morris On albums (see below), it features English Morris dance tunes and songs, played with a combination of traditional instruments (button accordion, concertina, fiddle, etc.) and modern ones (electric guitar, bass, drums). In common with later records, dancers complete with bells and sticks were also included in the sessions. The album's name echoes that of Rock On, another 1972 record in which Hutchings was involved.

A digitally remastered version of the album was released on 18 January 2010.

The album is described by Allmusic's reviewer as

A beautiful, authentically rustic album, without a trace of elegance, and hardly even an effort at smoothing over the rough spots. The music and the performances have a quiet power and dignity, and a raw, direct nature that is extremely appealing.

The cover includes an amusing photograph of the principal participants in morris-associated costume, but with modern accessories – Hutchings' morris man sports a Gibson Flying V guitar, Kirkpatrick's chimney sweep a vacuum cleaner, Dave Mattacks on a Raleigh chopper bicycle and hobby horse, Barry Dransfield dressed as a woman with a balloon instead of a pig's bladder and the odd one out, Richard Thompson, dressed in Lincoln green holding a crossbow. This cover is in keeping with the jollity of the music, including as it does nonsense songs, exuberant dance, general bawdiness and the grand false start to Princess Royal. Later "Descendant Of" Morris On album covers followed this template.

The album was produced and engineered by John Wood.

== Track listing ==
(All tracks trad. arr. Dransfield/Mattacks/Kirkpatrick/Hutchings/Thompson)

Side One

1. "Morris Call"
2. "Greensleeves"
3. "The Nutting Girl"
4. "Old Woman Tossed Up In A Blanket(Roud 1297) / Shepherds' Hey / Trunkles"
5. "Staines Morris"
6: "Lads A'Bunchum / Young Collins"

Side Two

1. "Vandals Of Hammerwich"
2 "Willow Tree / Bean Setting / Shooting"
3 "I'll Go And 'List For A Sailor"
4 "Princess Royal"
5 "Cuckoo's Nest"
6 "Morris Off"

== Personnel ==
- John Kirkpatrick – Vocals, Button Accordion, anglo-concertina, harmonium, tambourine
- Richard Thompson – Vocals, electric guitar
- Barry Dransfield – Vocals, fiddle, acoustic guitar
- Ashley Hutchings – Vocals, bass guitar
- Dave Mattacks – Drums, tambourine

with

- Shirley Collins, listed as Shirley Hutchings on the original album – vocals on "The Willow Tree" and "Staines Morris"
- Bert Cleaver – Pipe and tabor on "Vandals Of Hammerwich"
- Ray Worman – Dances the Bacca Pipes Jig to "Greensleeves"
- Chingford Morris Men – Stick dances on "Lads A'Bunchum" and "Young Collins"

== Subsequent "Descendant Of" Morris On albums ==
(all produced by Ashley Hutchings)

- Son of Morris On (1976)
- Grandson of Morris On (2002)
- Great Grandson of Morris On (2004)
- Morris On The Road (2005)
- The Mother of all Morris (2007)
