= Jo Lustig =

American film producer

Joseph George Lustig (October 21, 1925 – May 29, 1999) was an American music entrepreneur.

== Early career ==
Lustig was born on October 21, 1925, in Coney Island, New York, the youngest child of five, to Yiddish-speaking Jewish immigrants from the Polish-Russian border. At the age of 12, he saw Billie Holiday singing in a club and fell in love with music.

During World War II, Lustig served as a medical orderly in the Asiatic-Pacific Theater.

He became an apprentice music journalist and press agent, meeting with entertainers such as Gloria Swanson and Mel Brooks. His early clients included Nat King Cole, the Birdland jazz club, and The Weavers.

In 1957, Lustig hired Joyce Glassman as an assistant; Glassman introduced him to her friends in a Greenwich Village bar, Cedar Tavern, the poets Gregory Corso and Allen Ginsberg and her then-boyfriend, an unknown writer named Jack Kerouac. After hours of conversation about the world of press agents, Lustig announced that Kerouac would write a play, "I Am a Camera", on the subject. When he received the manuscript at his office from Kerouac, he suggested revisions were necessary; the following week, Kerouac's On the Road was reviewed in The New York Times and hailed as a masterpiece. Lustig's play was never discussed again.

After touring Europe with Nat King Cole in 1960, he decided to relocate to London.

== Anglo-American folk music ==
In 1962 American folk singer Julie Felix decided to hitch-hike around Europe. In 1964 she finally arrived in Britain. Jo Lustig saw her potential and offered to become her agent. When Decca signed Julie Felix it was the first time a British label acquired a major folk artist. Lustig promoted her to record an album and a single ("Someday soon") and an appearance on the Eamonn Andrews TV show. She was the first British-based folk singer to fill the Albert Hall. In 1965 when Nico met Lustig at a party hosted by the co-producer of the Bond films, she said "I want to be a singer". A few weeks later she was on "Ready Steady Go", singing her first single, thanks to Jo. However, she was not successful, and in 1966 joined Andy Warhol at The Factory.

== British folk music ==
In 1968 Lustig spotted "The Pentangle". In 1969 he gave them one of the first mystery album sleeves – a silhouette of the band. The cover of their second album Sweet Child was designed by Peter Blake, creator of The Beatles "Sgt. Pepper cover. Lustig also brought Pentangle a U.S. concert tour beginning in February 1969 at the Fillmore East.

In 1970 Ralph McTell changed his manager Bruce May for Jo Lustig. In October he was able to fill the Royal Festival Hall. In 1972 Robin and Barry Dransfield's "Lord of all I Behold" was Melody Maker's Folk Album of the Year. Jo eagerly read the pop press and signed them up, even before the album was released. The two brothers were then signed to Warner Brothers in America, and were off on a big concert tour supporting another Lustig act, Ralph McTell. Unfortunately the brothers not only quarrelled with each other but Barry seemed to be psychologically unable to handle large-scale commercial fame. Jo tore up the contract in disgust. This gives a hint of how impatient and short-tempered Jo Lustig was. By the end of the 1972 McTell had also broken with Jo Lustig. Ralph's brother Bruce was in charge again. Another casualty of Jo's aggressive publicity-seeking approach was Anne Briggs, who was so disgusted that she gave up singing altogether, citing Jo as one of the reasons. Shel Talmy described him as "one of my most unfavourite people".

== Steeleye Span ==
After the departure of Martin Carthy and Ashley Hutchings, Steeleye Span were eager for commercial success. They sacked Sandy Roberton and signed up with Jo Lustig. He brought them a lucrative contract with Chrysalis, and lavish studio time. Within a year they had a hit, "Gaudete". Somewhere along the line, Jo Lustig managed Irish harpist Mary O'Hara, who emerged after a decade in a convent to become a popular easy listening act. He also managed folk singer Richard Digance and, for a while, Jethro Tull (during the "Songs from the Wood" period). In 1974, the Chieftains were still semi-professional, despite having released "Chieftains 4" in 1974, to worldwide praise. In 1975 they became full-time musicians and took Jo Lustig as their manager. He brought them a contract with a major label, Island Records. By 1982 Richard and Linda Thompson were also managed by Jo, but it is not clear when this started. About 1980 Jo Lustig created his own record label called Luggage, but only one act is known to have appeared in it – the Home Service. Jo financed the first Home Service single in 1981. Despite containing talented musicians, the Home Service were not commercially successful. Perhaps this was the reason that he gave up folk bands, and became a film producer.

== Lustig in films ==
In 1985 Jo produced The Doctor and the Devils a historical thriller. In 1987 there came his best-known venture, 84 Charing Cross Road, in which he was associate producer. In 1989 he started to specialise in television documentaries about musicians, starting with The Unforgettable Nat 'King'. Blondes: Anita Ekberg was also in 1999. Diana Dors was on television in 1999. Maria Callas : life and art (1999) was produced by Jo for video release.

== Personal life ==
In 1967, Lustig married Dee Daniels, a press assistant at a record company. The couple shared the management of Pentangle.

He died of pancreatic cancer on May 29, 1999, in Cambridge, England.
