= Governor (disambiguation) =

A governor is an official, usually acting as the executive of a non-sovereign level of government.

Governor may also refer to:

== Leadership ==
- Governor (China), the head of government of a province
- Governor (Japan), the highest ranking executive of a prefecture
- Governor (Russia), the chief executive of a federal subject of Russia
- Governor (Turkey), the official responsible for government decisions in a province
- Governor (United States), the head of state and head of government of a US state
- Governor (Les Invalides, France), a French military office

== Arts and entertainment ==
- The Governor (1939 film), a German film directed by Viktor Tourjansky
- The Governor (2009 film), a 2009 Turkish film
- The Governor (Nigerian TV series), a 2016 Nigerian "Nollywood" TV series
- The Governor (New Zealand TV series), a New Zealand television miniseries about Sir George Grey
- The Governor (British TV series), a British television series
- The Governor (The Walking Dead), a fictional character in The Walking Dead comic book series and television series
- "Governor", a song from the 1996 album 4am Friday by Avail
- Governor (film), 2026 Indian Hindi-language film

== People ==
- Governor (singer), American recording artist Governor Washington Jr (born 1983)
- The Governor (wrestler), a ring name of American retired professional wrestler Shannon Spruill (born 1975)

== Other uses ==
- Governor (device), a device that regulates the speed of a machine
  - Centrifugal governor, a type of governor that, for example, regulates fuel intake to an engine or rotating speed.
- Governor (linguistics), a type of syntactic object that has the potential to govern another
- Smith & Wesson Governor, a snubnosed revolver that fires .45 Colt, 2.5" .410 bore ammo, and moon-clipped .45 ACP
- A prison official in the UK and in Australia, see prison warden

== See also ==
- Governess, a woman employed as a domestic worker
- Governors State University, a public university in University Park, Illinois
- Jiedushi, military governors in 8th- to 11th-century imperial China
- School governor, a voluntary role in state schools of England, Wales and Northern Ireland
- Governor Island (disambiguation)
- The Guv'nor (disambiguation)
