= Rainbow Chasers =

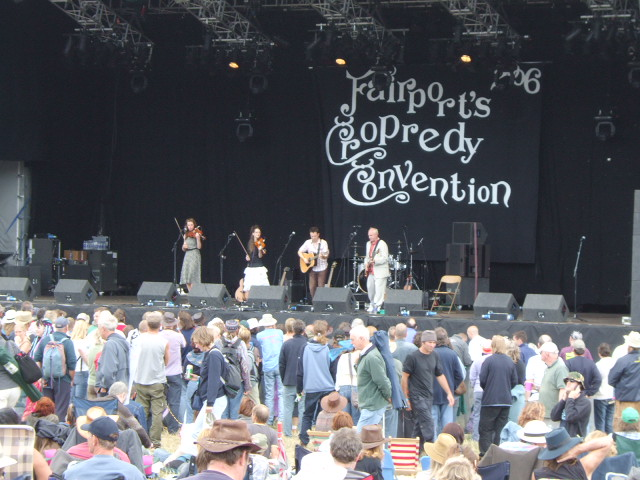

Background information
- Also known as: The Albion Dance Band and The Albion Band
- Origin: England
- Genres: Folk Music
- Years active: 2004–present
- Label: Talking Elephant
- Members: Ashley Hutchings; Ruth Angell; Jo Hamilton; Joe Topping
- Past members: Mark Hutchinson
- Website: http://www.myspace.com/rainbowchasersmusic

Rainbow Chasers are an English folk band, formed in 2004 by Ashley Hutchings. They play traditional and original compositions largely on acoustic instruments and have gathered a reputation for their quality of their musicianship, arrangements and live performances.

== History ==
=== Origin ===
After the suspension of Ashley Hutchings’ long running focus the Albion Band in 2002, he ceased to have a full-time touring and recording project. In 2004, he decided to put together a small group based around talented young musicians. The original lineup besides Hutchings on bass was: Mark Hutchinson on guitar, Ruth Angell on violin and guitar and Jo Hamilton on viola, and guitar. All four members contribute vocals to the sound of the band, which combines folk with classical sensibilities. In 2008 Mark Hutchinson left the band and was replaced by guitarist/singer-songwriter Joe Topping.

=== Recordings and performances ===
After a short tour in 2004, the first album, Some Colours Fly was released early in 2005. This was followed by a DVD of their performance at Huntingdon Hall in Worcester, and a shortened CD version as A Brilliant Light (2005). A third album Fortune Never Sleeps was released in 2006 to coincide with their first performance at Fairport Convention’s Cropredy Festival that year, where they played to 20,000 people.

== Discography ==
=== Albums ===
- Some Colours Fly (Talking Elephant, 2005)
- A Brilliant Light (Secret Records, 2005)
- Fortune Never Sleeps (Talking Elephant, 2006)

=== DVD ===
- Ashley Hutchings & Rainbow Chasers, Appearing At Huntingdon Hall (2005)
