= The Fiddler's Dream =

Studio album by Dransfield
- Released: 1976
- Recorded: 1976
- Label: Transatlantic
- Producer: Brian Harrison

The Fiddler's Dream is a folk / folk-rock album by Dransfield, a short-lived group principally comprising the Dransfield brothers, Robin and Barry. Originally released as an LP in 1976 by Transatlantic, catalogue number TRA 322, featuring cover illustrations by Paul Ellis.

The album was produced by Brian Harrison and recorded at Livingstone Studio, Barnet during March and April 1976. Engineer was Nic Kinsey.

== Track listing ==
All tracks composed by Barry Dransfield except "The Alchemist and the Pedlar" by Robin and Barry Dransfield and "It's Dark in Here" by Robin Dransfield. "The Blacksmith" is very loosely based on the folk-song of the same name.

1. Up to Now
  1. Up to Now 4:15
  2. The Blacksmith 1 2:45
2. Losers and Winners
  1. The Alchemist and the Pedlar 7:30
  2. It's Dark in Here 4:07
  3. The Handsome Meadow Boy 6:07
3. The Fool
  1. The Fool's Song 3:46
  2. The Ballad of Dickie Lubber 4:37
4. The Beginning of the Never Ending
  1. The Blacksmith 2 2:27
  2. What Will We Tell Them? 2:30
  3. Violin 6:38

== Personnel ==
- Barry Dransfield - Vocals, electric and acoustic fiddles, electric dulcimer, cello, guitar, zither
- Robin Dransfield - Vocals, guitar
- Brian Harrison - Vocals, bass guitar, organ, piano

with

- Charlie Smith - Drums
