= The Guv'nor vol 1 =

Compilation album by Ashley Hutchings
- Released: 1994
- Recorded: 1966–1993
- Genre: Folk
- Length: 73:20
- Label: HTD Records

The Guv'nor vol 1 is a compilation of recordings by English folk musician Ashley Hutchings.

== Production ==
Recordings were compiled from studio demos, live performances, and some studio finished products. Almost all had never been released before and the quality is variable. The tracks date from 1966 to 1993.

== Release ==
At the time, the tracks by Fairport Convention attracted the most attention. Since 1993, most of these rarities have become available as bonus tracks on Fairport albums, or in the boxed set called "The Boxful of Treasures". The two Steeleye Span rarities have not become available elsewhere, but these recordings are of such poor fidelity that they must have been made on domestic, not professional equipment. Tracks four, six, and 16 were written by Bob Dylan. The compilation was released on CD in 1993.

== Track listing ==
1. "Washington At Valley Forge" (The Ethnic Shuffle Band) (1966)
2. "Some Sweet Day" (Fairport Convention) (1967)
3. "You're Gonna Need My Help" (Fairport Convention) (1968)
4. "Dear Landlord" (Fairport Convention) (1969)
5. "College Grove/ Silver Spear" (instr) (Steeleye Span) (1970)
6. "Lay Down Your Weary Tune" (Steeleye Span) (1970)
7. "Four Hand Reel/ St. Anne's Reel" (instr) (The Albion Country Band) (1972)
8. "Horn Fair" (The Etchingham Steam Band) (1974)
9. "Lament/ Rotta" (The Albion Dance Band) (1974)
10. "(a) A Sailor's Life/ (b) One More Day" (The Albion Band) (1979)
11. "The Bluebell" (instr) (The Albion Band) (1979)
12. "Six Days on the Road" (The Albion Band) (1979)
13. "The Albion Band is Here Again" (The Albion Band) (1982)
14. "Lost In Space/ Only When I Laugh" (The Albion Band) (1984)
15. "Elements Laments" (The Albion Band) (1988)
16. "Angelina" (The Ashley Hutchings Allstars) (1988)
17. "3 Bampton Morris Tunes" (instr) (The Albion Band) (1988)
18. "We Lie" (Duet Version) (The Albion Band) (1993)
19. "Didn't He Ramble" (The Albion Band) (1993)

== Personnel ==
There are over 45 performers on this album. The most notable, in alphabetical order, are:

- Steve Ashley on 7
- Phil Beer on 14 and 15
- Martin Carthy on 5 and 6
- Shirley Collins on 8
- Julie Covington on 10b
- Sandy Denny on 3 and 4
- Sue Draheim on 7
- Barry Dransfield on 12
- Judy Dyble on 2
- Trevor Foster on 14 and 15
- Clive Gregson on 16
- Tim Hart on 5 and 6
- Ashley Hutchings
- Peter Knight on 5 and 6
- Cathy Lesurf on 13 and 15
- Martin Lamble on 2, 3, and 4
- Dave Mattacks on 7 and 16
- Ian Matthews on 2 and 3
- Simon Nicol on 1, 2, 3, 4, 7, 9, 13, 18, and 19
- Philip Pickett on 10
- Maddy Prior on 6
- Andy Roberts on 12
- Ric Sanders on 10 and 11
- Martin Simpson on 12
- John Tams on 10
- Graeme Taylor on 10 and 11
- Richard Thompson on 2, 3, and 4
- Chris While on 18 and 19
- Pete Zorn on 16
