= Governors Island (disambiguation) =

Governors Island is a small island in New York City.

Governors Island or Governor's Island may also refer to:

- Governor's Island, Bermuda
- Governors Island (Prince Edward Island), Canada
- Governors Island (Massachusetts), in Boston Harbor
- Governors Island (Lake Winnipesaukee), New Hampshire
- Governor's Island, in Island Pond (Rockingham County, New Hampshire)
- Governors Island (North Carolina), in Lake Norman
- Governors Island (Bryson City, North Carolina), listed on the National Register of Historic Places listings in Swain County, North Carolina

== See also ==
- Governors Island National Monument, on the island in New York City
- Governor Island (disambiguation)
- Governador Island in Rio de Janeiro
- Gouverneur Island (southern Antarctica)
