= Dransfield =

Dransfield is a surname. Notable people with the surname include:

- Barry Dransfield (b. 1947), English folk musician and sibling of Robin Dransfield
- Don Dransfield, Canadian politician
- John Dransfield (b. 1945), botanist specialising in palms and spouse of botanist Soejatmi Dransfield
- Joseph Dransfield (1827–1906), New Zealand politician
- Michael Dransfield (1948–1973), Australian poet
- Robin Dransfield, English folk musician and sibling of Barry Dransfield
- Soejatmi Dransfield (b. 1939), botanist and spouse of botanist John Dransfield

== See also ==
- Dransfield Island, an island in Saskatchewan, Canada
