= The Guv'nor vol 4 =

1996 compilation album by Ashley Hutchings

Compilation album by Ashley Hutchings
- Released: 1996
- Recorded: 1967–1996
- Length: 55:17

Ashley Hutchings chronology
The Guv'nor's Big Birthday Bash (1995)	The Guv'nor vol 4 (1996)	Folk Aerobics (1997)

The Guv'nor vol 4 is a compilation of recordings by Ashley Hutchings.

These recordings come from studio demos, live performances and some studio finished product. Almost all had never been released before and the quality is variable. They date from the period 1967 to 1996. Most of the songs and tunes are traditional. The album has the distinction of having the earliest recorded version of Joni Mitchell's "Both Sides Now", though the version by Judy Collins was the first to become commercially available. At the time Joe Boyd was a producer who was friends with both Joni Mitchell and Fairport Convention, and he brought their attention to some early work by her. Sandy Denny is the author of "Fotheringay", and Billy Bragg wrote "Love Gets Dangerous". Track 10 is one of the last that Richard Thompson recorded before emigrating to the USA. The two tracks by Len Hutchings (Ashley Hutchings' father) are biographical. Released on CD in 1996. Running time 55 minutes 17 seconds.

== Track listing ==
1. "Both Sides Now" (Fairport Convention) (1967)
2. "Fotheringay" (Fairport Convention) (1969)
3. "Mistress's Health/ Lumps of Plum Pudding/ Sherbourne Jig/ Spaniards Cry" (Etchingham Steam Band) (1973)
4. "Quakers Wife/ Little Burnt Potato" (instr) (Albion Dance Band) (1976)
5. "Here We Come A-Wassailing" (Albion Dance Band) (1977)
6. "Holm's Fancy/ Cuckolds All Awry" (instr) (Albion Dance Band) (1977)
7. "I'm Looking Through You" (Albion Band & Albion Morris Men) (1978)
8. "A Simple Melody/ Faggot Dance" (The Albion Band) (1983)
9. "The Electric Guitar Is King" (Ashley Hutchings & Friends) (1984)
10. "Cecil Sharp Show" (excerpt - spoken word) (Ashley Hutchings) (1985)
11. "Personent Hodie" (The Albion Band) (1985)
12. "Love Gets Dangerous" (The Albion Band) (1986)
13. "Pa's Piano Stool" (excerpt - spoken word) (Len Hutchings) (1993)
14. "Turnpike Reel" (Beer, Hutchings & While) (1995)
15. "The Willow" (The Albion Band) (1995)
16. "It is Not For The Want of Will" (Ashley Hutchings & Ken Nicol) (1996)
17. "Swallow Your Gum" (Ashley Hutchings Dance Band) (1996)
18. "Pa's Piano Stool" (excerpt 2 - spoken word) (Len Hutchings) (1993)
19. "Wings" (Ashley Hutchings & Ken Nicol) (1996)

== Personnel ==
There are over 35 performers on this album. The most notable, in alphabetical order, are:

- Phil Beer on tracks 11,12 and 14
- Paul Burgess on 17
- Martin Carthy on 10
- Shirley Collins on 3
- Julie Covington on 7
- Sandy Denny on 2
- Judy Dyble on 1
- Martin Lamble on 1
- Dave Mattacks on 6 and 9
- Ian Matthews on 2
- Ken Nicol on 16,17 and 19
- Simon Nicol on 1,2,5,6,9 and 15
- Dave Pegg on 9
- Philip Pickett on 5 and 6
- Ric Sanders on 5,6 and 7
- John Tams on 4,5,6 and 7
- Graeme Taylor on 4,5,6 and 7
- Richard Thompson on 1,2 and 10
- Pete Zorn on 17
