= Governor Island =

Governor Island may refer to:

- Governor Island (Connecticut), United States
- Governor Island (Tasmania), Australia
- Governor Island (Georgian Bay), an island of Ontario, Canada
- Governor Island, Falkland Islands

== See also ==
- Governors Island (disambiguation)
