= Jo Hamilton (musician) =

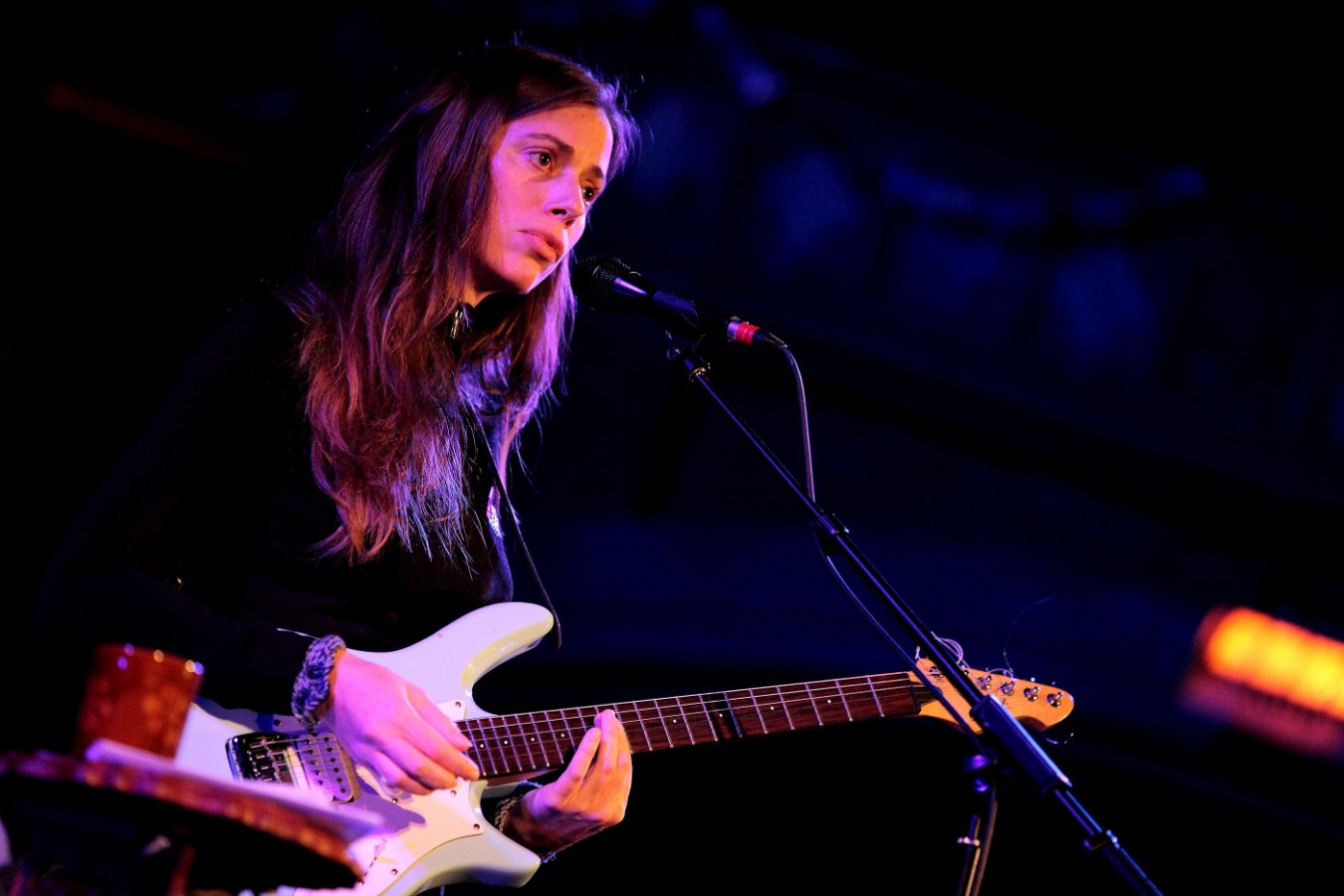
- Jo Hamilton performing at Union Chapel, Islington

Background information
- Born: Joanna Susan Hamilton
- Genres: Pop, pop rock, Indie pop, electropop, alternative rock, jazz, folk
- Occupations: Musician, composer
- Instruments: Vocals, guitar, piano, viola, violin, programming
- Years active: 1999–present
- Label: Poseidon
- Website: www.johamilton.com

Jo Hamilton is a Scottish vocalist, composer and multi-instrumentalist based in Birmingham, England. Her official debut album Gown was released in September 2009 by independent production company and label Poseidon to four star reviews in the UK from Mojo magazine, The Independent, and The Independent on Sunday. In December 2009, she released an EP of Christmas songs which BBC Radio 2's Janice Long put on her Album of the Week list for the week of 14 December. Nic Harcourt at KCRW Radio in Los Angeles chose Gown as one of his four picks for KCRW's 2010 Winter subscription drive. In 2010, Hamilton became the first musician in the world to work with an Airpiano.

== Biography ==
Hamilton is the daughter of a Jamaican mother and Kenyan father, although both families trace their roots back to Scotland. The first decade of her life was spent in the Scottish Highlands, Between stints abroad, Hamilton attended Gordonstoun School, near Elgin in Morayshire, Scotland, to which she was awarded a music scholarship aged 12. She went on to study viola at Napier University in Edinburgh, and then won another scholarship to read viola performance at the Birmingham Conservatoire, in the city where she is based.

== Music career ==
Hamilton has supported Damien Rice, Michelle Shocked, and Colin Vearncombe (Black). She also contributed viola to Kirsty McGee's first album, and was invited by Fairport Convention founder (and discoverer of Nick Drake) Ashley Hutchings to sing lead vocals and play guitar and viola with first the Albion Band and then his new bands the Rainbow Chasers and The Lark Rise Band on several European tours.

=== Gown ===
Her first released album, Gown, got UK distribution in September 2009. In July 2009, in the lead-up to this release, she was featured artist twice on BBC Radio 2 in the same week, performing a session on Janice Long's show and featuring on Aled Jones' Sunday morning show. Upon its release Gown received 4 star reviews in the UK from Mojo, Rock n Reel, The Independent and The Independent on Sunday. Simmy Richman from the Independent on Sunday wrote of Gown: "In a world of La Roux and Lady Gaga, this is an unashamedly grown-up record that dares to step out of the boxes we have reserved for our female singer-songwriters". In January 2011 a Special Edition version of Gown was released featuring additional tracks, an expanded booklet and revised artwork.

In early 2013, Prince and his new band 3rdEyeGirl performed an instrumental cover version of Liathach from Gown as part of their world tour set, opening several shows with it - with Prince playing piano.[13]

=== Fractals ===
In 2014, Hamilton announced work was under way on her 2nd album, to be called 'Fractals'. Some of the material was previewed at Fractal Sparks at Durham Cathedral.

=== Live work ===
The first launch concert for Gown was held on 20 April 2009 at the Glee Club, Birmingham, to mark the early fulfilment of pre-orders of Gown to her fanbase. A London launch was held in September 2009 at The Tabernacle in Notting Hill. In December 2009 Hamilton appeared at the Union Chapel, London, and then supported Scott Matthews at Birmingham Town Hall. In January 2010 she performed an internet-only concert for fans followed in April 2010 by an intimate concert at the Slaughtered Lamb, London, which received a 4 star review from the Guardian's Caroline Sullivan, who called her 'a find'.

In 2011, Hamilton played on the main stage at TEDGlobal as well as several festivals and smaller solo shows.

In 2012, following a significant uplift in her social media following, Hamilton launched a headlining tour entitled 'Always Heading West' with her band. The tour took in Singapore, Kuala Lumpur, London and Falmouth in the UK and Milan and Rome in Italy.

In 2014, Hamilton took over Durham Cathedral to create "Fractal Sparks", a one-off son et lumiere previewing some new work to appear on forthcoming 2nd album 'Fractals'. The show featured brass from The Band of the Royal Corps of Signals and 28 metre high projections of fire, waves and other natural phenomena. This was followed by theatre shows in London, Lincoln and a small tour of Canada.

=== Work with the Airpiano ===
In April 2010, Hamilton revealed she was the first artist in the world to be working with a prototype Airpiano, a non-contact electronic instrument being developed by Berlin-based inventor Omer Yosha. Hamilton had been looking for a way to recreate some of the intricate textures from Gown live without resorting to backing tracks, and had stumbled upon Yosha demonstrating a very early version on YouTube. She travelled to Berlin to meet Yosha and collect a prototype instrument from him which he'd made specially for her to experiment with it and give feedback to Yosha. The result was a short film entitled 'A New Instrument' about Hamiton's trip to Berlin and her resultant work with the instrument. The film received over 30,000 views on YouTube in the first three weeks, and was eventually syndicated by over 200 technology and music websites worldwide. In September 2010 she appeared live with the Airpiano at the Apple Store on Regent Street in London, assisted by Gown producer Jon Cotton and bassplayer Chaz West, to demonstrate and talk about her work with the instrument.

2011/12 appearances with the Airpiano included playing on BBC World Service's 'Click' January special to several million listeners, appearing on BBC Radio 4's Loose Ends, on Channel 5's Gadget Show and in the UK's Wired Magazine., and finally on the main stage at TEDGlobal 2011.

=== Films ===
As well as the Airpiano film 'A New Instrument', Hamilton has created a series of films to accompany Gown. These serve as both EPKs (electronic press kits) for industry use, and as visual extensions of Gown in their own right.

The first EPK film (now renamed Gown Film 1) was released as a teaser in December 2008, several months before Gown itself was released. It opens with a quote from Scott Matthews, followed by a succession of footage shot herself in Slovenia, Italy, France and the UK while on tour, set to the song "There It Is" from Gown. The second half of the EPK is a live performance of the song "Liathach", which was shot in a gatehouse in Birmingham, the home of artist and furniture designer Chris Eckersley. This features metal birdhouses made by Eckersley who after viewing the footage revealed that his inspiration for the birdhouses was in fact a video by the 1960s group The Byrds which looked uncannily similar. Later in the song the footage cuts to another live performance shot in Teatro Circolo Fratellanza in Casnigo near Bergamo, Italy. The first EPK was later released as a limited edition on DVD, accompanied by animations by Jordan Cadby based on the Gown album sleeve.

The second EPK film (aka Gown Film 2) was released in September 2009. It features footage shot on tour in Scotland and Paris as well as footage of her performing in Birmingham, in the studio and on the Janice Long show on BBC Radio 2. This is used as the backdrop to a series of press and radio quotes and is set to the songs "How Beautiful" and "Think of Me" from Gown.

== Discography ==
- December 2000 – 'Palace Place' (unreleased CD album of early demos)
- December 2008 – Gown EPK 1 (DVD release, limited edition)
- April 2009 – "Winter is Over" (download-only single)
- September 2009 – Gown (download and CD Digipak)
- September 2009 – "Pick Me Up" (download and CD single)
- December 2010 – Gown special edition (iTunes-only download)
- January 2011 – Gown special edition (download and CD Digipak)
- December 2011 – Gown illuminated (DVD)
- November 2017 - "War is Over" (Guest vocals on Blind Zero's "Often Trees" album)
