= Fort Jay =

Historic military fortress in New York City

Fort Jay Fort Columbus
- Part of Governors Island
- New York County, New York, United States
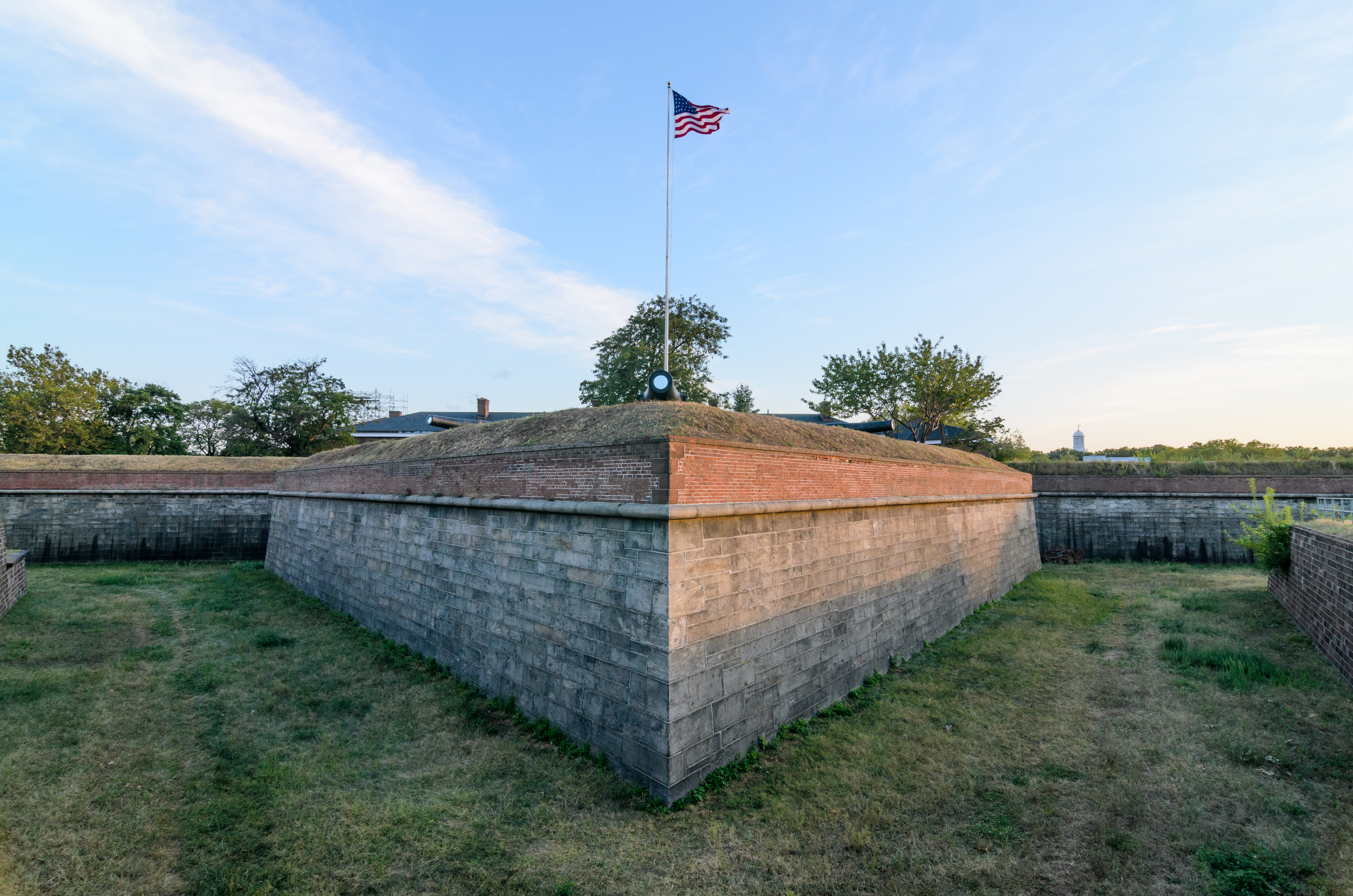

Site information
- Type: Fortification
- Owner: Public – National Park Service
- Controlled by: United States of America
- Open to the public: Yes
- Fort Jay
- U.S. National Register of Historic Places
- New York City Landmark
- Location within New York City Location within New York Location within the United States
- Coordinates: 40°41′28.89″N 74°0′57.63″W
- Visitation: 126,000 (2008)
- NRHP reference No.: 74001268
- NYCL No.: 0543

Significant dates
- Added to NRHP: March 27, 1974
- Designated NYCL: September 19, 1967
- Condition: Good

Site history
- Built: 1794, 1806, 1833
- Built by: United States Army Corps of Engineers, Jonathan Williams
- In use: 1794–1997
- Materials: Sandstone, Granite, Brick

Fort Jay is a coastal bastion fort and the name of a former United States Army post on Governors Island in New York Harbor, within New York City. Fort Jay is the oldest existing defensive structure on the island, and was named for John Jay, a member of the Federalist Party, New York governor, Chief Justice of the United States, Secretary of State, and one of the Founding Fathers of the United States. It was built in 1794 to defend Upper New York Bay, but has served other purposes. From 1806 to 1904 it was named Fort Columbus, presumably for explorer Christopher Columbus. Today, the National Park Service administers Fort Jay and Castle Williams as the Governors Island National Monument.

== American Revolution ==
Fort Jay is situated on Governors Island (which was known as Nutten Island from 1664 to 1784, based on Dutch Noten Eylandt for "Nut Island"). Specifically, the fort is located on the site of earthworks originally built to defend New York City during the American Revolution. General Israel Putnam constructed the first earthen fortification on this site starting in April 1776, and armed it with eight cannons for the defense of New York Harbor. Additional guns were later emplaced, and on July 12, 1776 the Nutten Island batteries engaged HMS Phoenix and HMS Rose. The American cannons inflicted enough damage to make the British commanders cautious of entering the East River, which later contributed to the success of General George Washington's August 29–30 retreat from Brooklyn into Manhattan after the defeat in the Battle of Brooklyn. The Americans abandoned the earthworks that September, resulting in the eventual British occupation of New York City. The British Army improved the existing earthworks and used the island as a British Royal Navy hospital until they departed on November 25, 1783. At that time Governors Island was conveyed to the State of New York.

== Federal period ==
In the years following the end of British occupation of New York in 1783, the works deteriorated. A decade later in 1794, the State of New York began to finance improvements to the earthworks, then in ruins. The fort was reconstructed as a square with four corner bastions, and was named after the Federalist New York governor John Jay. By 1797 Congress appropriated $30,117 for continued construction. Eventually, to allow for continued federal funding and upkeep of the works, the state conveyed Governors Island and the works at Fort Jay to the federal government in February 1800 for one dollar.

In 1806 the earthworks were replaced by granite and brick walls and the footprint of the fort enlarged to designs by Major Jonathan Williams, chief engineer for the U.S. Army Corps of Engineers, superintendent of the United States Military Academy, and supervisor of fortifications in New York Harbor. The fort was rebuilt and enlarged as part of what became known as the Second System of US seacoast fortifications. Williams replaced the earthworks with sandstone and granite walls and an arrow-shaped ravelin, all surrounded by a dry moat. The moat was in turn surrounded by a sloped grassy area or glacis that was once was cleared of trees, providing a clear field of fire toward any advancing enemy forces. The slope was also designed to retard or stop cannon shot from warships. The overall result is still evident in the fort's design and its position on the highest point on the island. Construction of the walls and gate of the existing fort were completed in 1808. Later, small wood and brick barracks buildings were constructed in the enclosed square space.

The fortification was initially named Fort Jay for John Jay, a member of the Federalist Party, New York governor, Chief Justice of the Supreme Court, Secretary of State and one of the Founding Father of the United States. Jay, as George Washington's Secretary of State, negotiated the Jay Treaty of 1794 with Great Britain. With the election of Thomas Jefferson as President in 1800 there was a shift of power from the Federalists, of which Jay was a prominent member, to the Democratic-Republican Party. Jefferson's party objected to the treaty, which resolved outstanding issues from the American Revolution. Following the 1806 rebuilding, and with the change in presidential administrations and the recent transfer to the federal government, the fort was renamed Fort Columbus, presumably for Christopher Columbus.

The post was renamed at some time between December 15, 1806 and July 21, 1807. Edmund Banks Smith, an Episcopal priest, Army chaplain, and author of an early history of Governors Island wrote in 1913 that this was "supposed to have been due to Jay’s temporary unpopularity with the Republican party, which was not satisfied with the Jay Treaty with England". However, this has not been substantiated, and no documentation for the name change has been found. The fort retained the name "Columbus" throughout the rest of the 19th century, finally reverting to Fort Jay in 1904.

Fort Columbus played an important role in the military life of New York City as the largest army post defending the city. The fortification, in concert with Fort Wood on Liberty Island, Fort Gibson on Ellis Island, Castle Clinton at the Battery in Lower Manhattan, and two other fortifications on Governors Island, South Battery and Castle Williams, provided protection for the city and Upper New York Bay. This system of coastal fortifications is credited with discouraging the British from taking any naval action against the city during the War of 1812, who preferred easier targets in the Great Lakes, the Chesapeake Bay (resulting in the burning of Washington, D.C.), and the Gulf of Mexico below New Orleans.

== 19th century and the Civil War ==
In subsequent years, beginning in the 1820s, Fort Richmond, Fort Hamilton, and Fort Lafayette at the Narrows of New York Harbor reduced the need for the Upper Harbor forts, and in time, the Army transferred most properties in Upper New York Bay to other federal agencies or sold them to the state of New York. Fort Columbus, however, possessed 68 acres (280,000 m^{2}), a sufficient land mass for a modest garrison at a reasonable proximity (1,000 yards (910 m)) to Manhattan, making it the most practical of the Second System forts for the Army to retain and continue to garrison.

Personnel stationed at Fort Columbus began to record meteorological observations in the 1820s.

As the closest major army post to the United States Military Academy at West Point, New York, Fort Columbus for many years served as a first posting or a major departure point for newly graduated cadets shipping to army posts along the Atlantic or Pacific coasts. Many future generals in the Civil War were posted to or passed through Fort Columbus as young junior officers. They included John G. Barnard, Horace Brooks, Abner Doubleday, Ulysses S. Grant, Robert E. Lee, Joseph E. Johnston, John Bell Hood, Theophilus H. Holmes, Thomas Jackson, Henry Wager Halleck, James B. McPherson and others.

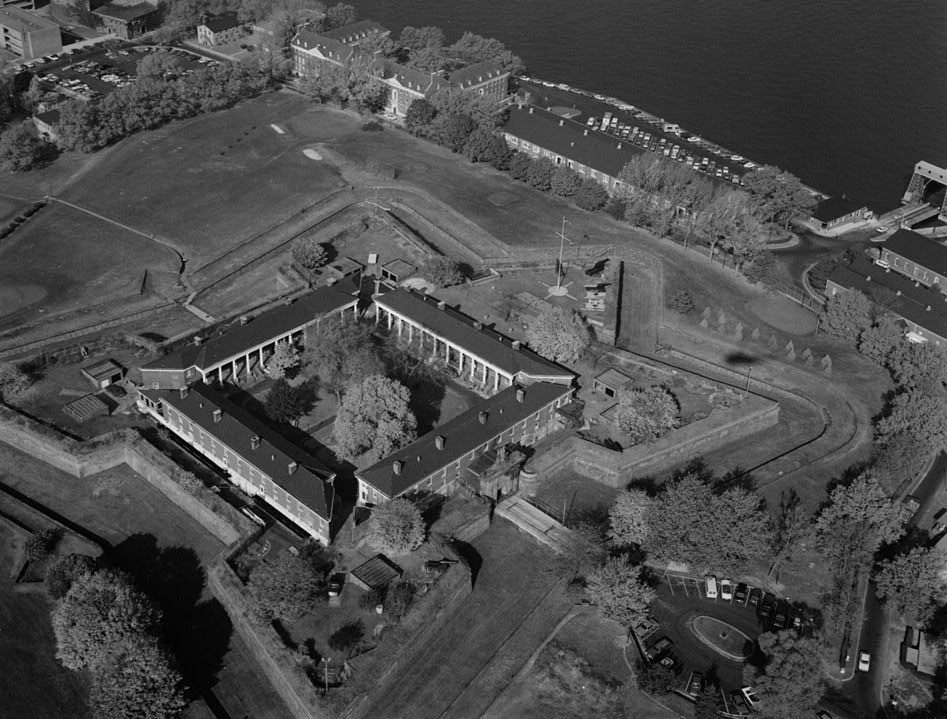
Aerial view of the fortifications.

In the 1830s, the protective value of Fort Columbus diminished with the advance of weapons technology, but other uses evolved for the army post. The Army renovated the fortification beginning in 1833 with the construction of four barracks that remain to the present day, replacing wooden barracks. The barracks were built as the fortification's importance in protecting New York was diminished by the construction of the new forts at The Narrows of New York Harbor. The Greek Revival style barracks, unified by two-story Tuscan porticos first served as officers' and enlisted men's housing for the permanent garrison. That same year the Ordnance Department established the New York Arsenal as a separate installation, adjacent to but not part of Fort Columbus, as a major depot taking delivery of contracted manufactured arms and weapons and distributing both contract and federally manufactured weapons to army posts across the nation. In 1836, the South Battery became the Army School of Music Practice, training young boys to become company drummers and fife players and regimental musicians.

The army located its General Recruiting Service for infantry troops at Fort Columbus in November 1852, and many regiments in the army detailed officers to Fort Columbus on recruiting details.

Twice, in December 1860 and April 1861, the Army "secretly" dispatched troops and provisions from Fort Columbus to relieve the besieged garrison at Fort Sumter in Charleston, South Carolina. Outgoing President James Buchanan initiated the first effort, but a battery garrisoned by cadets from The Citadel, The Military College of South Carolina fired on the Army-chartered New York-based steamship Star of the West on January 9, 1861 as it entered Charleston Harbor. The incident provoked a crisis, prompting other southern states began to more seriously consider secession from the Union. The second effort, with new Army recruits departing from Fort Columbus on April 9, 1861, also failed when it prompted South Carolina forces to fire on Fort Sumter early in the morning of April 12, 1861, resulting in the start of the Civil War.

In the early years of the Civil War, the north barracks were used to hold Confederate officers taken as prisoners of war pending transfer to other Union prisons such as Camp Johnson in Ohio, Fort Delaware or Fort Warren in Boston Harbor. Fort Columbus and Castle Williams also served as a temporary prisoner of war camp and confinement hospital for Confederate prisoners during the war. Major General William H. C. Whiting (CSA) died of dysentery in February 1865 in the post hospital shortly after his surrender at the Battle of Fort Fisher, North Carolina. He was the highest ranking Confederate officer to die as a prisoner of war.

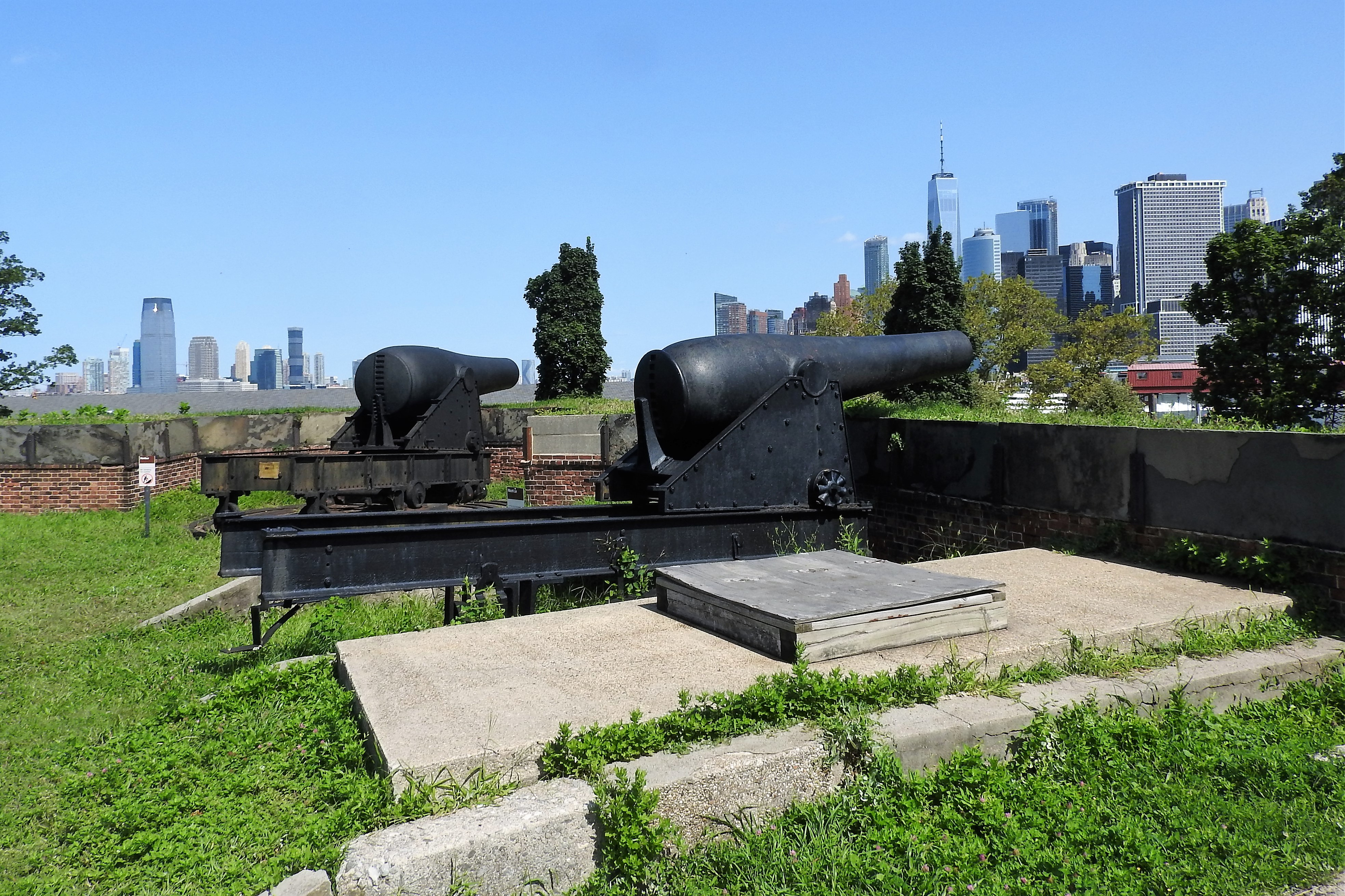
15-inch Rodman gun (left) and 10-inch Rodman gun (right).

Late in war and the immediate years after it, the armament of the fort was upgraded with nearly fifty 10-inch (254 mm) and 15-inch (381 mm) Rodman guns. As the result of a World War II scrap drive, four 10-inch and one 15-inch guns were retained at the fort's east entrance gate and north ravelin as ornaments, while the remainder were shipped on barges to steel mills in Pittsburgh, Pennsylvania and scrapped for the war effort in October 1942.

== Division and departmental headquarters ==
In the years after the American Civil War, New York Arsenal served as a major center for disposing of surplus and excess cannons and munitions for war memorials in national cemeteries and for municipalities, scrap, or sale to foreign governments.

In 1878, as part of a servicewide cost-cutting effort, the United States Army relocated many of its administrative functions from rented quarters in large urban centers to neighboring army posts. In New York City, nearly all army functions in the city were relocated to Governors Island, making Fort Columbus the headquarters for the Division of the Atlantic and later the Department of the East. Both commands then included almost all army activities east of the Mississippi River. The prestige of a command at Fort Columbus as a premier posting ranked second only to high-ranking army positions in Washington, D.C., and many commanders went on to become Commanding General of the United States Army. Its departmental commanders from the 1880s to the 1900s included Winfield Scott Hancock, Wesley Merritt, Oliver O. Howard, Nelson Miles, Arthur MacArthur, and other combat commanders in the Civil War, the Indian Wars, and the Spanish–American War.

== 20th century ==
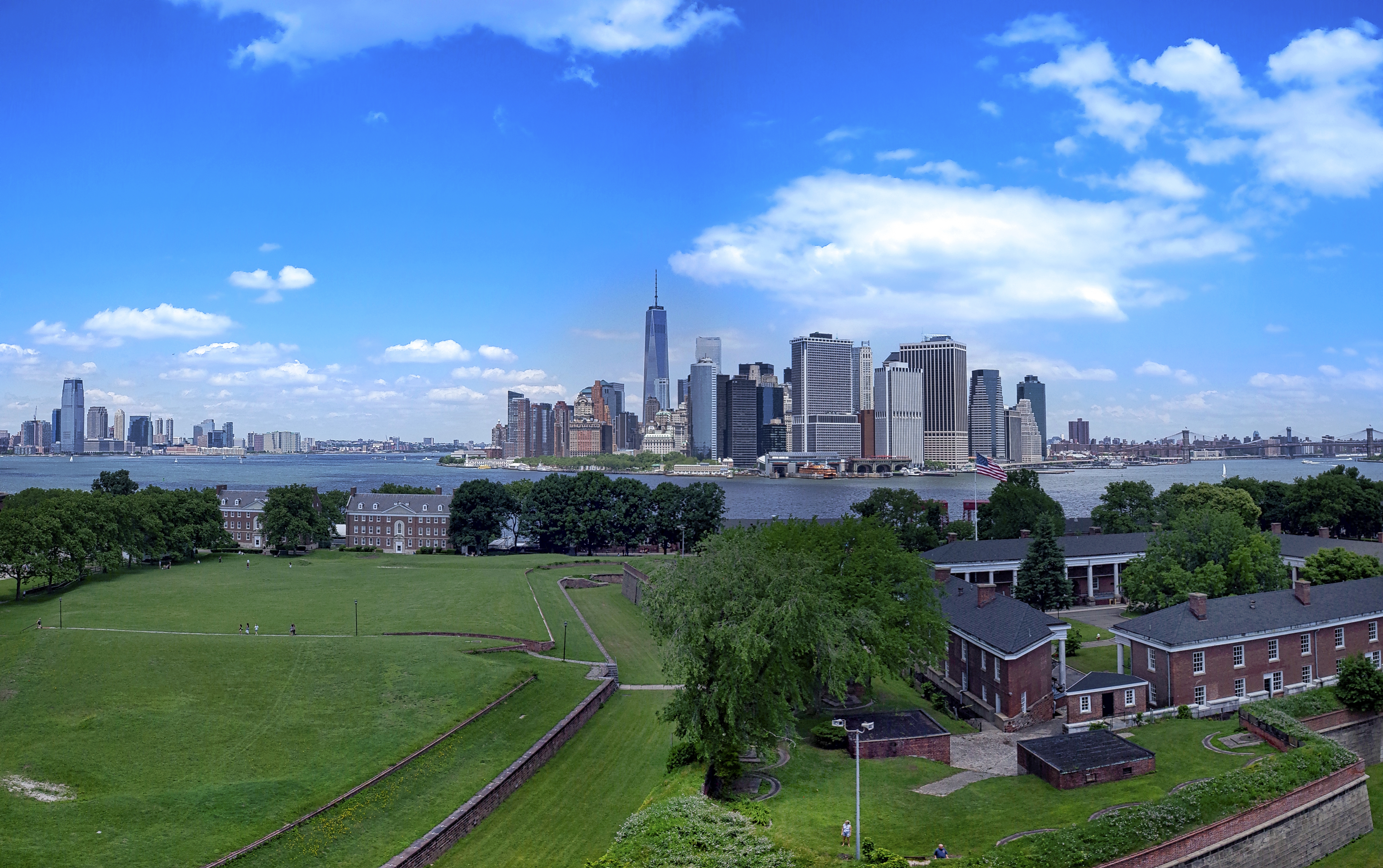
Looking north across Fort Jay with Lower Manhattan skyscrapers in the background.

At the turn of the century, Fort Columbus and Governors Island began to draw the attention of President Theodore Roosevelt's Secretary of War, Elihu Root, a former New York City lawyer. Root sought to enhance the island army post to better serve the army's needs, to fend off efforts by the City of New York to close the post and reclaim the island as a city park and a rarely stated need to provide a quick means of federal protection of Wall Street, the Customs House and Sub-Treasury in Lower Manhattan. Root instigated the expansion of the island from its original 60 acres to 172 acres with landfill from the newly constructed New York City Subway and dredge from New York Harbor. Root also commissioned the New York architectural firm of McKim, Mead and White to develop a master plan for the island which would demolish all the existing buildings on the island except for the three original fortifications on the island and a newly constructed chapel. The retention of the fortifications indicated Root's interest in retaining the historical structures, as some of the army decision makers he supervised were trying to accomplish their demolition. In one of his departing acts as Secretary of War in February 1904, Root restored the original name of Fort Jay to the fortification and to the army post that had evolved around it.

A 1930s WPA project was the complete conversion of the barracks in Fort Jay to family housing. Each company barracks was transformed into four townhouse-style apartments that served junior officers as family housing. As a further concession to the automobile, eight two-car garages were constructed inside the fort behind the barracks to serve the fort's residents.

During World War II Fort Jay was the headquarters of First Army in the early part of the war, and later the Eastern Defense Command (EDC), responsible for all Army units and defense coordination in the northeastern United States, and in the east coast states from Maine through Florida. These were primarily coast defense, antiaircraft, and fighter assets. US Army forces in Newfoundland and, from April 1942, Bermuda were also included in the EDC.

== End of military career ==
In November 1964 after a year of study to identify ways to downsize Department of Defense installations, the U.S. Army announced the closure of Fort Jay. The merging of Second Army duties and functions with that of First Army and relocating First Army's headquarters to Fort Meade, Maryland. In 1966, the United States Coast Guard (USCG) assumed control of Governors Island and continued to use Fort Jay to house officers until it closed its Governors Island base in September 1996. Fort Jay was listed on the National Register of Historic Places in 1974.

On January 19, 2001, Fort Jay, Castle Williams and a surrounding 23 acres were proclaimed part of the Governors Island National Monument, administered by the National Park Service, with Fort Jay recognized as being one of the finest remaining examples of the Second System of American military fortifications. Since 2003, both fortifications have been open to the public on a seasonal basis. The remainder of the island undergoes redevelopment by the City of New York through the Trust for Governors Island.

== See also ==
- List of New York City Designated Landmarks in Manhattan on Islands
- National Register of Historic Places listings in Manhattan on islands
