= Son of Morris On =

Studio album by Ashley Hutchings and others
- Released: 1976
- Genre: Folk music
- Label: Harvest
- Producer: Ashley Hutchings

Ashley Hutchings and others chronology
Morris On (1972)	Son of Morris On (1976)	Grandson of Morris On (2002)

Son of Morris On is a British folk rock album released in 1976 under the joint names of Ashley Hutchings, Simon Nicol, John Tams, Phil Pickett, Michael Gregory, Dave Mattacks, Shirley Collins, Martin Carthy, John Watcham, John Rodd, The Albion Morris Men, Ian Cutler, and the Adderbury Village Morris Men.

Like the previous Morris On (1972) and subsequent "Descendant Of" Morris On albums, it features English Morris dance tunes and songs, played with a combination of traditional instruments (concertina, melodeon, fiddle, etc.) and modern ones (electric guitar, bass, drums). In common with later records, dancers complete with bells and sticks were also included extensively in the sessions. In retrospect, Hutchings remarked that with Son Of Morris On it was 'attempted to move the Morris forward a little', compared with the Morris On album which featured 'very little dancing' and had a certain rawness to it, which Hutchings found developable and 'endearing' at the same time.

A couple of Morris tunes had already been played by early incarnations of Ashley Hutchings' Albion Country Band. The coupling of Jockey To The Fair and Room For The Cuckoo was part of a Morris dance medley in 1972, which was framed by an acoustic and electric setting of Fieldtown Processional. A BBC recording of this medley appears on volume 2 of Ashley Hutchings' The Guv'nor compilation. Saturday Night and a version of Winster Processional (Furry Dance) were performed in the same year as well.

The cover photo by Peter Vernon mirrors that of the original Morris On album with a photograph of the principal participants (left to right: Michael Gregory, Phil Pickett, Ashley Hutchings, Simon Nicol and John Tams) in morris-associated costumes, but with modern accessories.

The album was produced by Ashley Hutchings.

It has been compared favourably with the original Morris On album. Paul Saunders in a review for the BBC Radio 2 website described it as 'a far more subtle and interesting affair'.

== Track listing ==
1. 'Winster Processional' (0.56)
2. 'Monck's March' (2.53)
3. 'Old Hog or None' (1.15)
4. 'As I Was Going to Banbury' (1.23)
5. 'The Happy Man' (3.02)
6. 'Fieldtown Processional / Glorishears' (2.50)
7. 'Bob and Joan' (0.15)
8. 'Ladies of Pleasure' (1.38)
9. 'Bring Your Fiddle' (2.17)
10. 'Jockey to the Fair / Room for the Cuckolds' (2.36)
11. 'Saturday Night' (2.20)
12. 'Roasted Woman / Rigs of Marlow / Getting Upstairs' (3.06)
13. 'Y'e Wild Morris / The Wild Morris' (1.39)
14. 'The Postman's Knock' (1.59)
15. 'Ring O' Bells' (2.41)
16. 'The Gallant Hussar' (3.21)
17. 'Bonnets So Blue' (1.54)
18. 'Old Hog or None (reprise)' (1.17)

CD bonus tracks from the 1994 CD (Harvest CZ 535) and 2003 CD (Talking Elephant TECD051):

1. 'Y'Acre of Land' (3.34)
2. 'Cotswold Tune' (2.59)
- Tracks 1–2, 11 trad. arr. Ashley Hutchings, John Watcham, Albion Morris;
- Tracks 3, 8, 14, 18 trad. arr. Martin Carthy, Ashley Hutchings;
- Tracks 4, 19 trad. arr. John Tams;
- Tracks 5, 10, 16–17 trad. arr. Ashley Hutchings;
- Track 6 trad. arr. Ashley Hutchings, John Watcham;
- Track 7 trad. arr. Ashley Hutchings, John Tams;
- Track 9 trad. arr. Ashley Hutchings, John Tams, Shirley Collins;
- Track 12 trad. arr. Ashley Hutchings, John Tams, John Watcham;
- Track 13 trad. arr. Phil Pickett;
- Track 15 trad. arr. Ashley Hutchings, Albion Morris;
- Track 20 Ric Sanders

== Personnel ==
- Albion Morris Men
- Adderbury Village Morris Men with James Plester – fiddle
- David Armitage (dancer from the Hammersmith Morris Men)
- Eddie Upton (dancer from Chanctonbury Ring Morris Men)
- John Tams – vocals, spoken vocals, dialogue, concertina, melodeon
- Shirley Collins – vocals, dialogue
- Martin Carthy – vocals, guitar
- John Watcham – concertina
- John Rodd – concertina
- Phil Pickett – bagpipes, curtals, shawm, recorders
- Ian Cutler – fiddle
- Ric Sanders – fiddle
- Simon Nicol – guitar
- Graeme Taylor – guitar
- Pete Bullock – keyboards
- Ashley Hutchings – bass
- Michael Gregory – drums, percussion, tabor, tambourine
- Dave Mattacks – drums
