= The Guv'nor vol 3 =

1995 compilation album by Ashley Hutchings

Compilation album by Ashley Hutchings
- Released: 1995
- Recorded: 1968–1994
- Length: 63:52

Ashley Hutchings chronology
The Guv'nor vol 2 (1995)	The Guv'nor vol 3 (1995)	The Guv'nor's Big Birthday Bash (1995)

The Guv'nor vol 3 is a compilation of recordings by Ashley Hutchings.

These recordings come from studio demos, live performances and some studio finished product. Almost all had never been released before and the quality is variable. They date from the period 1968 to 1994. Track 8, "By The Time It Gets Dark" is a Sandy Denny composition that she never herself recorded professionally. This version with Julie Covington on lead vocals, was one of the first Denny songs to be recorded after her death. The 1612 collection of tunes "Terpsichore" by Michael Praetorius is rarely given an outing in folk circles, but here we have 4 of the tunes. It is probably the only folk-rock treatment that they have been given. The raucous version of "Harvest Home/ The Gas almost Works" comes from the Battle of the Field sessions, and you have to wonder why this was not included on the original album. The first two tracks were written by Joni Mitchell. Released on CD in 1995. Running time 63 minutes 52 seconds.

== Track listing ==
1. "Night in the City" (Fairport Convention) (1968)
2. "Marcie" (Fairport Convention) (1968)
3. "Harvest Home/ The Gas Almost Works" (instr) (Albion Country Band) (1973)
4. "Fair Maid of Islington" (Albion Dance Band) (1976)
5. "Three Waltzes" (instr) (The Sawdust Band) (1976)
6. "Y'Acre of Land" (Albion Dance Band) (1977)
7. "Boycott's Bouree" (instr) (Albion Dance Band) (1977)
8. "By The Time It Gets Dark" (The Albion Band & Julie Covington) (1978)
9. "Pain or Paradise" (live) (The Albion Band) (1979)
10. "Four Tunes From Terpsichore 1612" (instr) (live) (The Albion Band) (1979)
11. "Moon Shines Bright And The Stars Give A Light" (The Albion Band) (1981)
12. "Princess Royal" (instr) (live) (The Albion Band) (1981)
13. "Down the Road" (instr) (live) (The Albion Band) (1981)
14. "It Doesn't Matter Anymore" (The Albion Band) (1988)
15. "Loose Hornpipe/ Dancing Till Monday Comes Around" (live) (Albion Dance Band) (1988)
16. "Spencer The Rover" (Albion Dance Band) (1988)
17. "The Carthorse" (Ashley Hutchings and Friends) (1989)
18. "Brief Encounters" (The Albion Band) (1993)
19. "The Oak" (The Albion Band) (1994)

== Personnel ==
There are over 35 performers on this album. The most notable, in alphabetical order, are:

- Phil Beer on tracks 15,16 and 17
- Martin Carthy on 3
- Shirley Collins on 4
- Julie Covington on 8 and 9
- Sandy Denny on 1 and 2
- Trevor Foster on 15,16 and 17
- Sue Harris on 3
- John Kirkpatrick on 3
- Martin Lamble on 1 and 2
- Cathy Lesurf on 14
- Ian Matthews on 1 and 2
- Simon Nicol on 1,2,3,4,6,7,18 and 19
- Philip Pickett on 6,7,9, 10 and 13
- Ric Sanders on 6,7,8,9 and 10
- John Tams on 6,8,9,12 and 13
- Graeme Taylor on 5,6,7,8,9 and 10
- Linda Thompson on 8
- Richard Thompson on 1 and 2
- Pete Zorn on 15
