= Governor Island (Tasmania) =

Island in Tasmania, Australia

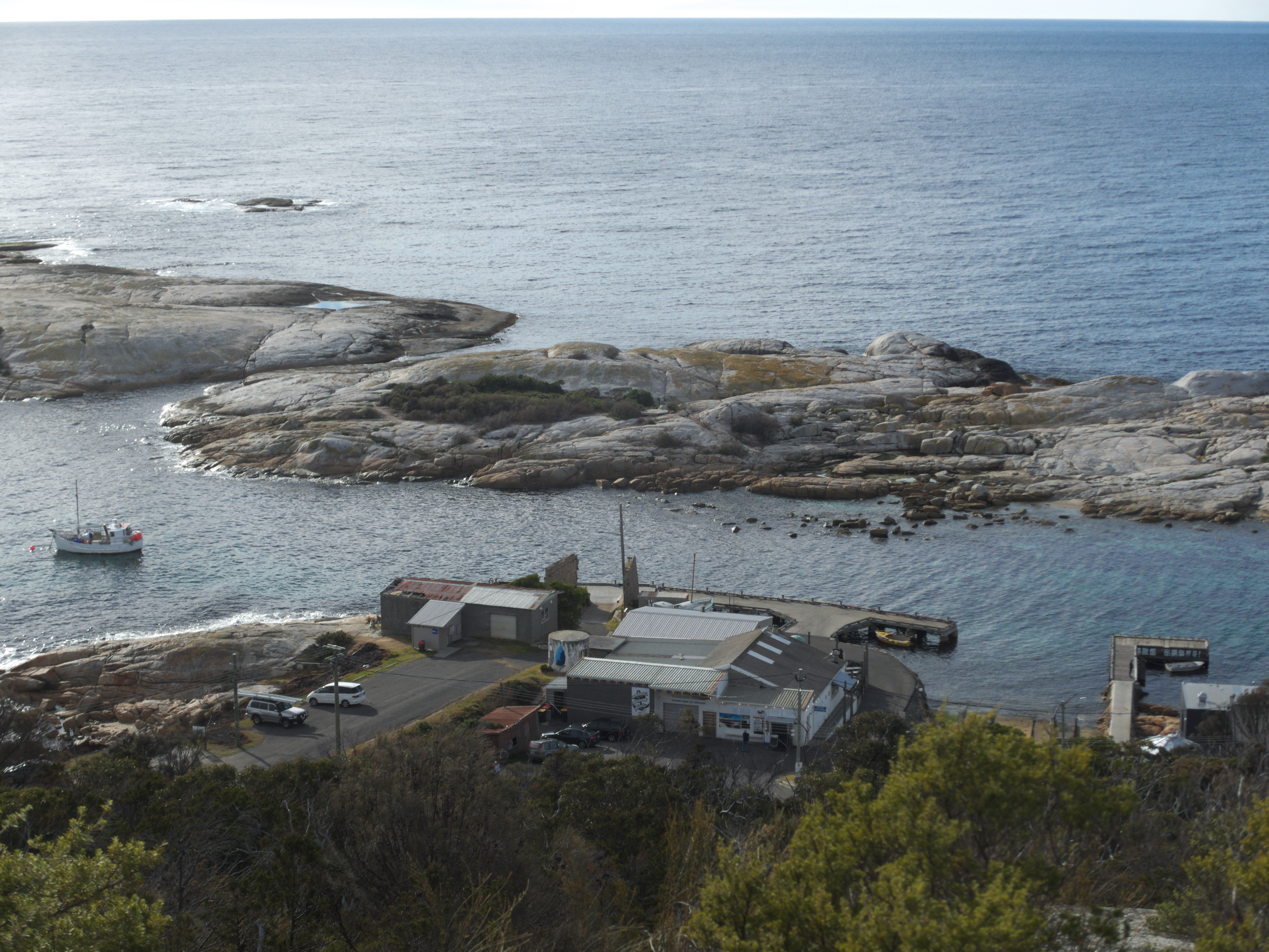
- Part of Governor Island seen from Whalers Lookout in Bicheno

- Location within Tasmania

Geography
- Location: East Coast Tasmania
- Coordinates: 41°52′22.33″S 148°18′44.87″E
- Archipelago: Schouten Island Group
- Area: 2 ha (4.9 acres)

Administration
- Australia
- State: Tasmania

Additional information
- Time zone: AEST (UTC+10)
  - Summer (DST): AEDT (UTC+11)

The Governor Island, part of the Schouten Island Group, comprise two small granite islands with a combined area of about 2 hectares (4.9 acres) that lie close to the eastern coast of Tasmania, in south-eastern Australia. The island is located near the Freycinet Peninsula and the town of Bicheno and is a nature reserve.

== Fauna ==
Recorded breeding seabird and wader species are little penguin, silver gull, sooty oystercatcher and crested tern.

== See also ==
- List of islands of Tasmania
