= Barry Dransfield =

English folk singer and musician (1947–2026)

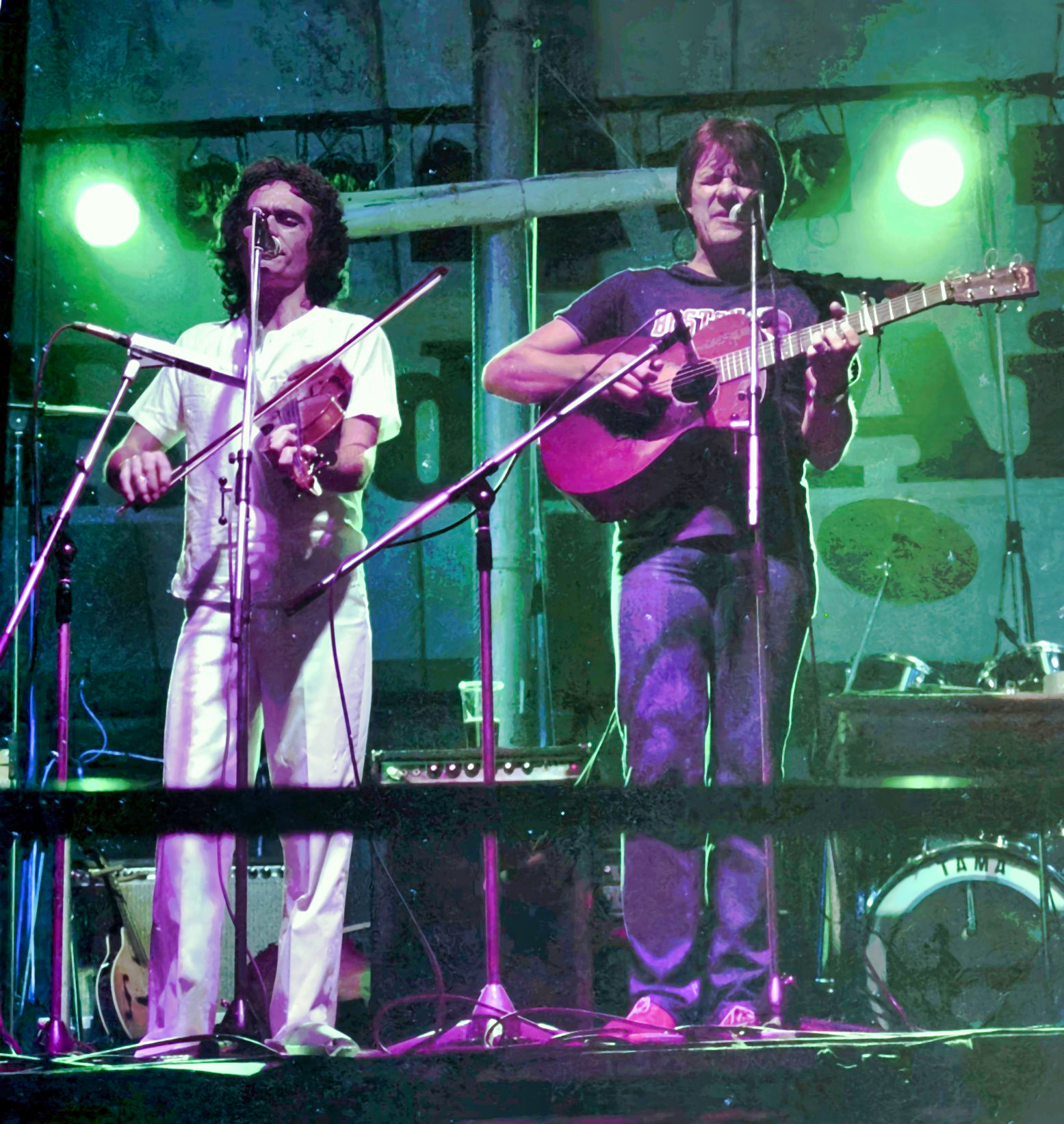
Barry Dransfield (on left) with brother Robin at the Leeds Folk Festival, 1983

Barry Dransfield (1947 – 14 June 2026) was an English folk singer, fiddler, cellist and guitarist.

== Background ==
Barry Dransfield was born in Harrogate, West Riding of Yorkshire, England in early 1947. He appeared as a session musician on numerous albums by other artists, and released his own albums as well. The Rout of the Blues (1971) was voted Melody Maker folk album of the year. His 1972 album for Polydor simply called Barry Dransfield was voted the rarest folk album in Record Hunter, worth approximately £400. Unlike most fiddlers (but like some Appalachian players) he was comfortable playing in the "off the chest" position, instead of under the chin.

Together with his brother Robin, he was a member of a bluegrass/old-time band while still in his teens. Always innovative, he generally avoided electric instruments. The instrumental "Blacksmith", on Fiddler's Dream, is a complex set of variations in Romantic Paganini style, with no obvious relation to the song "Blacksmith", but ending with a double-tracked voice of Dransfield singing the finishing line, "Oh, Witness Have I None, save God Almighty". Fiddler's Dream has been re-issued on Castle with many bonus tracks.

Dransfield died on 14 June 2026, aged 79. He had been hospitalised with a lung infection in May, and had been diagnosed with Alzheimer's disease three years prior.

== In television and film ==
Dransfield composed music for several films for television and the wide screen: S.O.S. Titanic, Adelaide Harris, Play Away, Samson and Delilah (1985), Ballymena Opera House and The Wreck of the Julie Plante (1985). He acted the part of the blind fiddler in The Bounty (1984) (with Mel Gibson and Anthony Hopkins). In 1986, he changed career to become a so-called "Fiddle Doctor", repairing violins and cellos. In 1994, he joined the Steeleye Span UK tour.

== Discography ==
- Rout of the Blues (1970) (with Robin Dransfield)
- Lord of All I Behold (1971) (with Robin Dransfield)
- Morris On (1972) (with Ashley Hutchings, Richard Thompson, John Kirkpatrick et al.)
- Barry Dransfield (1972)
- The Fiddler's Dream (1976) as a member of the band Dransfield
- Popular to Contrary Belief (1977) (with Robin Dransfield)
- Bowin' and Scrapin' (1978)
- Be Your Own Man (1994)
- Troubadours of British Folk, Vol. 1 (1995) (anthology)
- Wings Of The Sphinx (1996)
- Up To Now (1997) (compilation with rarities and unreleased tracks)
- Unruly (2005)
