= Grandson of Morris On =

Studio album by Ashley Hutchings and others
- Released: 2002
- Genre: Folk music
- Length: 36:38
- Label: Island
- Producer: John Wood

Ashley Hutchings and others chronology
| Son of Morris On (1976) | Grandson of Morris On (2002) | Great Grandson of Morris On (2004) |

Grandson of Morris On is a thematic album produced by Ashley Hutchings and others.

Twenty-six years after recording "Son Of Morris On", Hutchings put together an ensemble to play another selection of Morris dance tunes. Compared to previous efforts this is less electric, and more acoustic. As before there are real Morris sides (Adderbury, Stroud Morris and The Outside Capering Crew) dancing with their own musicians. Although many musicians appear in the credits, only two or three appear together on most tracks. The loud punchy tune "Le Halle Place" is probably the highlight of the album. Chris Leslie has recorded Morris dance albums in his own right. The liner notes were written just after the events of "9/11", and reflect a certain despair at the possibility of world war. Recorded 2001. Released on CD in 2002. Running time 55 minutes 12 seconds.

== Track listing ==
1. The Blue-Eyed Stranger/ The Curly-Headed Ploughboy (Tune: Trad/Words: Ashley Hutchings)
2. Le Halle Place (instr) (Chris Leslie)
3. The Life of a Fool (Ashley Hutchings/Simon Care)
4. The Quaker's Wife (spoken) (Trad)
5. Shepherd's Hey/ Orange in Bloom/ The Quaker (instr) (Trad)
6. Tom Long's Post (a.k.a. Three Jolly Sheepskins) (instr) (Trad)
7. Jupiter's Return/ Bold Eric/ Tailor's Buttons (Dave Whetstone)
8. Little Johnny England (Trad)
9. Hi-ho-fiddle-dee-dee (spoken) (Trad)|
10. Black Joke (instr) (Trad)
11. Gloucester Hornpipe/ Mr Trill's Song (Trad/Ashley Hutchings - Bob Pegg)
12. Sweet Jenny Jones (instr) (Trad)
13. Horatio (instr) (Dave Whetstone)
14. Garland Gay (Trad)
15. Saturday Night / Bobbing Joe / Beaux Badby (instr) (Trad)
16. He Sits There (spoken) (Maida Stanier)
17. Glorishears (instr) (Trad)
18. The Snake (a.k.a. Gypsy Hornpipe) (instr) (Trad)
19. This Is The Morris My Friend (Ashley Hutchings - Simon Care)
20. Four Up (Barry Goodman, arr. The Outside Capering Crew)
21. Four Up - Reprise (Barry Goodman, arr. The Outside Capering Crew)

== Personnel ==
- Chris Leslie - vocals, fiddle
- Phil Beer - fiddle, vocals, mandolin, acoustic guitar
- Simon Care - melodeon
- Jon Moore - acoustic guitar
- John Shepherd - piano
- Martin Brinsford - tambourine, voice, triangle, mouth organ
- Ric Sanders - synthesiser, baritone fiddle
- Simon Nicol - acoustic 6 & 12 string guitars
- Ashley Hutchings - electric bass, vocals
- Adderbury Morris Men - morris dance bells
- Neil Marshall - drums and percussion
- Ken Nicol - electric and acoustic guitar
- Mark Rogers - melodeon
- Sharon Kilyon - melodeon
- Dave Whetstone - melodeon and anglo concertina
- Jim Walker - drums
- Stephen Wass - melodeon
- Stroud Morris Dancers - morris dance bells
- John Shepherd - keyboards
- Judy Dunlop - backing vocals
- Blair Dunlop - backing vocals
- Mick Twelves - backing vocals
- The Outside Capering Crew - morris bells and 'verbals'
- Barry Goodman - melodeon
- Lawrence Wright - melodeon

Produced by Ashley Hutchings
