= Great Grandson of Morris On =

Studio album by Ashley Hutchings and others
- Released: 26 April 2004
- Label: Talking Elephant
- Producer: Ashley Hutchings

Ashley Hutchings and others chronology
Grandson of Morris On (2002)	Great Grandson of Morris On (2004)	Morris On The Road (2005)

Great Grandson of Morris On, produced by Ashley Hutchings, and recorded and released in 2004, is the fourth volume in the series of Morris dance tunes. Spiers and Boden experienced a blaze of publicity shortly after recording their contribution to this album (track 3), which later appeared on the compilation album The Magic of Morris. There are more amateur musicians on this album than on the previous volumes in the series.

== Personnel ==
Roger Wilson (vocals, fiddle), Ken Nicol (guitars, vocals), Simon Care (melodeon, concertina), Ashley Hutchings (electric bass, voice), Guy Fletcher (fiddle, drums, vocal), Bryony Griffith (fiddle), John Spiers (melodeon) (track 3), Jon Boden (fiddle, stomp-box) (track 3), Neil Wayne (concertina), John Shepherd (electronic keyboards, sampling), Lawrence Wright (melodeon, spoken voice) (tracks 6, 7 & 19), Mark Rogers (melodeon) (tracks 7 & 19), Dogrose Morris (tracks 2 & 11) The Outside Capering Crew (morris bells & 'verbals') (tracks 7 & 19,) William Hampson (melodeon). "Occasional Brass" (on tracks 12 and 14)(consisting of Martin Battersby (conductor), Peter Broadbent (baritone), Darryl Jackson (trombone), Matthew Challender (flugel), Mark Wardle (cornet), James Pickering (tuba), Judy Dunlop (vocals) (track 13). Produced by Ashley Hutchings. Running time 55 minutes 12 seconds.

== Track listing ==
1. "At the May Day celebrations (Tune: Trad/Words: Hutchings/Nicol)"
2. "Swaggering Boney (instr) (Trad)"
3. "Banbury Bill (Bampton)/Shepherd's Hey (Abingdon) (instr)(Trad)"
4. "Winster Morris Reel (instr) (Trad)"
5. "London Pride (instr) (Trad)"
6. "Now mind you this (spoken) (Jinky Wells)"
7. "Highland Mary (instr) (Trad)"
8. "The field and the farm (Ashley Hutchings/Ken Nicol)"
9. "The Devil's Details/ The Low Down (instr) (Ken Nicol)"
10. "Comes the morris dancer in (spoken) (Text from 1667)"
11. "Bonny Green garters (instr) (Trad)"
12. "Every year when the Wakes come along (Tune: Trad/Words: Hutchings/K Nicol)"
13. "First day at t'mill (Mabel F Harrison/Bernard Wrigley)"
14. "The Godley Hill set (instr) (Trad)"
15. "Happy the Age (spoken) (Text from 1654)"
16. "The Rose (instr) (Trad)"
17. "Jack-in-the-green on Saturday night (Tune: Trad/Words: Hutchings/K Nicol)"
18. "Under the old myrtle tree/ Morning star/ Billy Boy/ Banks of the Dee (instr) (Trad)"
19. "Washing day (instr) (Trad)"
