= Governors Island National Monument =

United States national monument

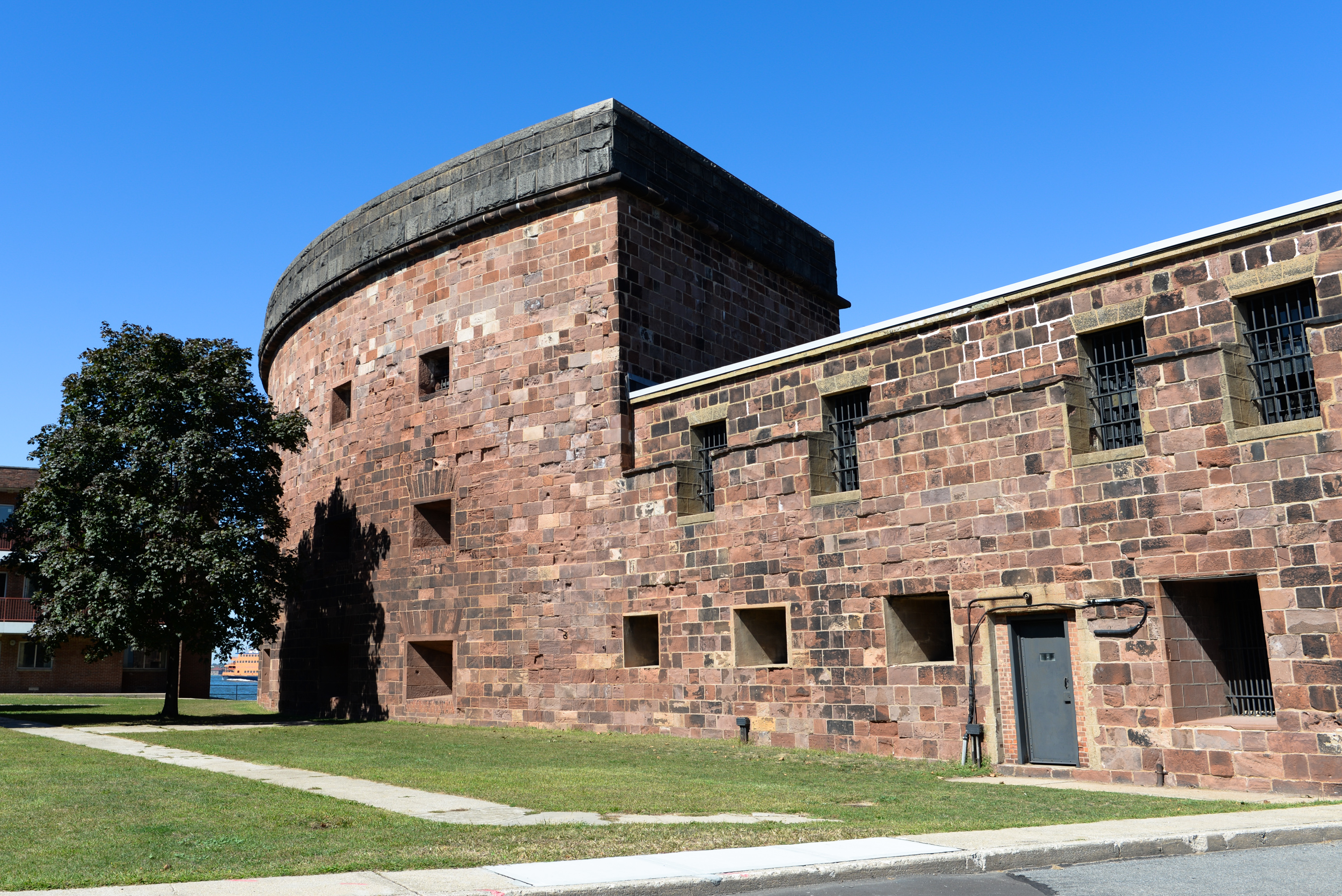
- Castle Williams

- Location within New York City Location within New York Location within the United States
- Interactive map of Governors Island National Monument
- Location: New York City, New York
- Coordinates: 40°41′29″N 74°0′58″W
- Area: 22.78 acres (9.22 ha)
- Created: January 19, 2001
- Visitors: 52,200 (in 2025)
- Governing body: National Park Service
- Website: Governors Island National Monument

Governors Island National Monument is a unit of the United States national park system in New York City. It is located on 22 acres (89,000 m^{2}) of Governors Island, a 172-acre (0.70 km^{2}) island located off the southern tip of Manhattan Island, at the confluence of the Hudson and East rivers in New York Harbor.

== Conversion to public use ==
In October 1995 the United States Coast Guard announced it would close its largest base, at Governors Island, as a cost savings measure. The Coast Guard had established the base on the island in 1966 after the U.S. Army closed Fort Jay, an Army post since 1794.

In 1996, the Coast Guard closed the base and conveyed it as surplus property to the federal government's General Services Administration for disposal through transfer or sale. The closure was at the initiative of the Coast Guard, then a bureau of the U.S. Department of Transportation, which was seeking to close a $400 million budget gap. The closure of the base represented an estimated 30 million dollar savings. Since the closure was an initiated action by the Coast Guard, it was not subject to the Base Realignment and Closure process.

At the time of the closure announcement in October 1995, President Bill Clinton and New York Senator Daniel Patrick Moynihan reached an informal agreement to convey the island to the city and state of New York for $1, if a plan for public benefit could be developed. The city was initially reluctant to take up Clinton's offer because it would not have been financially beneficial to the city. The issue was exacerbated when the United States Congress passed the Balanced Budget Act in August 1997, stipulating that the GSA sell the island at a fair market value by 2002. The island's sale was expected to net the federal government $500 million.

== Establishment of the monument ==
Map of Governors Island as of 2014

As President Clinton left office in January 2001, with no resolution of the island's future in hand, and at the urging of members of the New York congressional delegation, he established a Governors Island National Monument by Presidential Proclamation 7402 of January 19, 2001. The proclamation did not fully establish the boundaries of the monument, but did set forth the federal intention of preserving the fortifications, Fort Jay and Castle Williams, the oldest and most historic features on the island. The Justice Department under President George W. Bush concluded the proclamation possessed technical errors, but did not revoke or invalidate the proclamation.

In an April 2002 White House meeting with city and state officials, President Bush announced his intention to sell the island to the city and state of New York. While the White House intended the transaction to be concluded by September 2002, it took several months of negotiations with city, state and federal officials to resolve outstanding issues.

On January 31, 2003, the island was conveyed to an intermediary, the National Trust for Historic Preservation, which attached restrictive land use covenants to the deed, then conveyed the island to two parties: 22 acres (89,000 m^{2}) was conveyed to the U.S. Department of the Interior for use as a national monument; and 150 acres (0.61 km^{2}) went to the Governors Island Preservation and Education Corporation, formed jointly by the State and City of New York – now The Trust for Governors Island, an instrumentality of the City of New York – for the purpose of administering and redeveloping the island. Presidential Proclamation 7647 of February 7, 2003 formally re-affirmed the establishment of the national monument.

== Significance ==
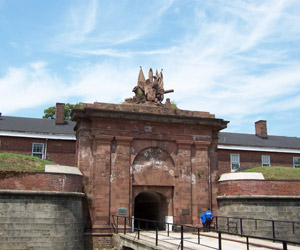
The entrance to Fort Jay, dating to 1794–1796, is the oldest structure on Governors Island.

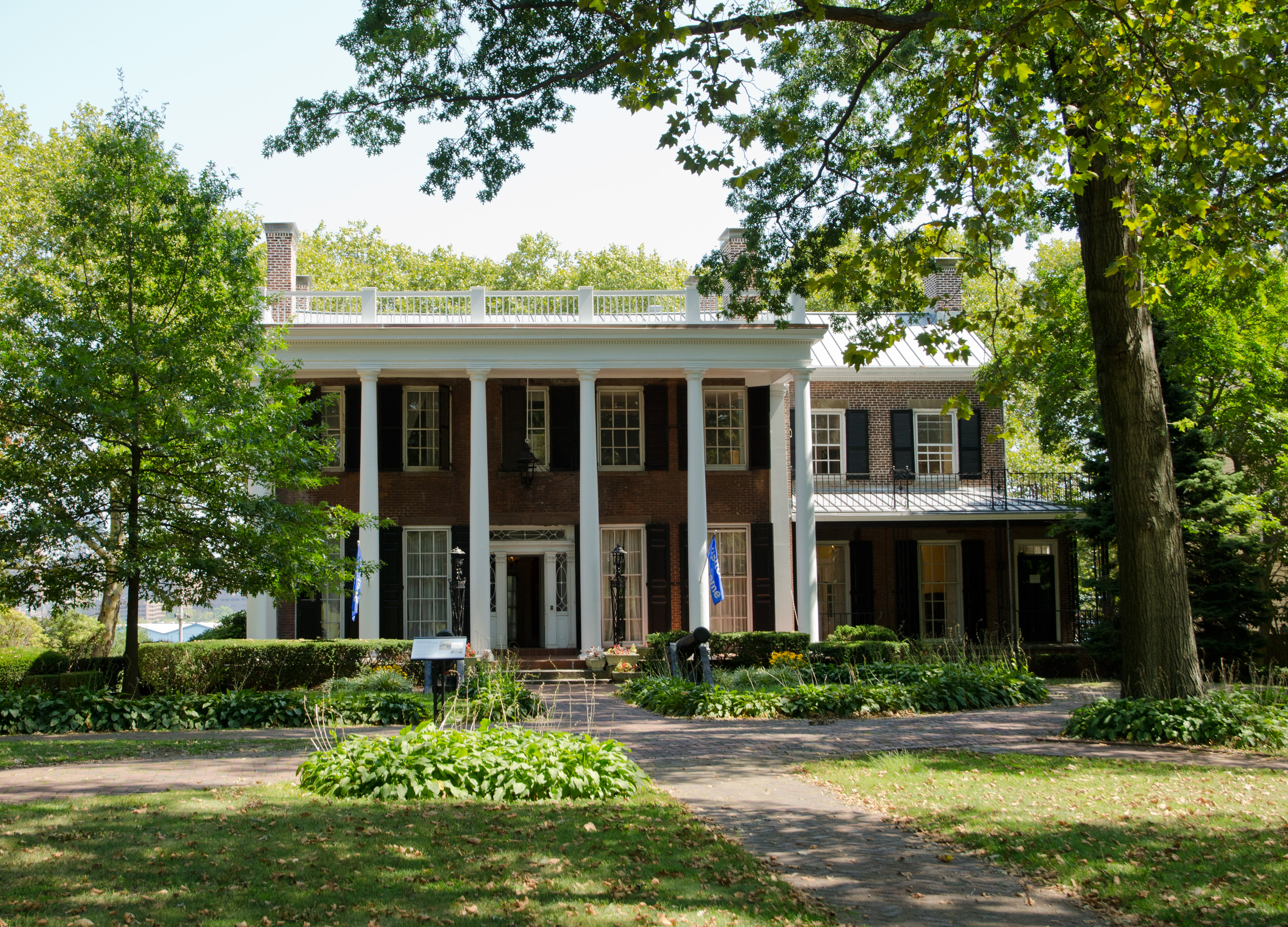
The commanding officer's quarters, known as the Admiral's House, is just outside the boundary of the national monument, but included in the Governors Island National Historic Landmark District.

Both presidential proclamations noted that the island served as an outpost to protect New York City from sea attack. Between 1806 and 1811, Castle Williams and Fort Jay were constructed as part of the First and Second American System of Coastal Fortification; they played important roles in the War of 1812, the Civil War, and World Wars I and II.

The fortifications were built on the most strategic defensive positions on the island. Fort Jay, first constructed in the 1790s and reconstructed between 1806 and 1809, is on the highest point of the island. The surrounding open space or glacis slopes down to the waterfront on all sides. Castle Williams, started in 1807 and completed in November 1811, occupies a rocky shoal that extended into the harbor channel at the northwest corner of the island and served as the most important strategic defensive point in the upper bay of New York Harbor.

By the 1830s, the protective functions of both fortifications had diminished, but the core of a small urban Army post evolved around them. By the 1870s, with deep reductions in a post-Civil War army, the post became a major headquarters for the U.S. Army, a role it played until their departure in 1966. The residential and institutional structures surrounding the two fortifications are now part of the Governors Island National Historic Landmark District, containing over 60 structures related to two centuries of the military history of the nation.

Since the island was managed by the United States Army and the United States Coast Guard for nearly 200 years, and was no longer required for defense or Coast Guard purposes, the establishment of the monument provided an excellent opportunity for the public to observe and understand the harbor history, its defense and its ecology.

The island and monument has been open on a seasonal basis during the summer months since 2005. The island became more popular over the years, attracting 275,000 visitors in 2009 and 800,000 visitors in 2018.

== See also ==
- List of national monuments of the United States
