= Robin Dransfield =

English folk musician

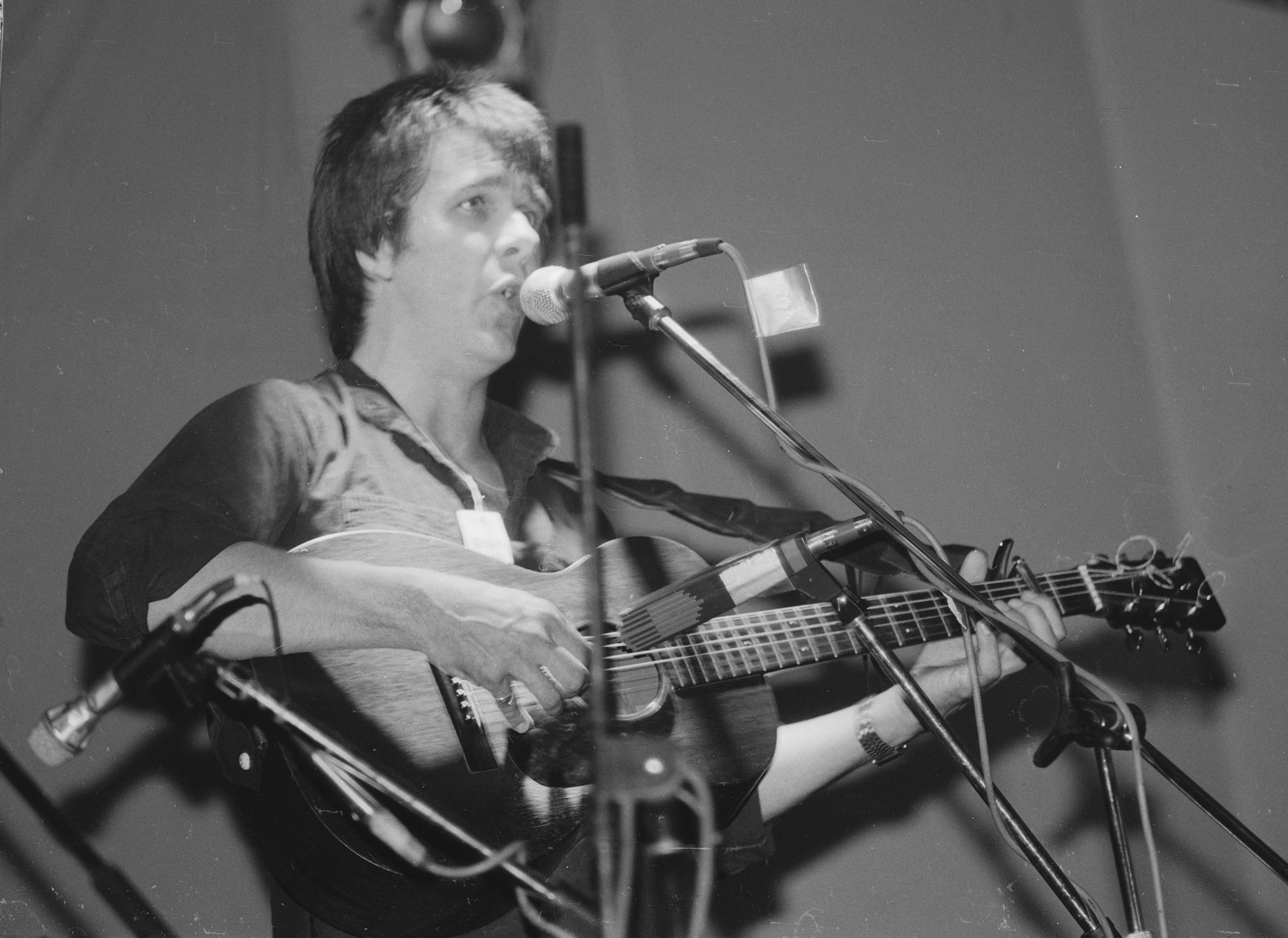
Robin Dransfield performing at the 1981 Essex Music Festival, U.K.

Robin Dransfield is an English folk musician from Harrogate, Yorkshire, England. He plays acoustic guitar and often performed and recorded in a duo with his brother Barry Dransfield. Dransfield began performing in the 1960s, quickly gaining prominence for his "quirky" bluegrass "old-timey" sound. By 1969, Barry and Robin were performing full-time as a duo, frequently playing at the Harrogate Folk Club along with Martin Carthy, Ewan MacColl, and The Watersons. Dransfield recorded several albums during the 1970s, including The Rout of the Blues (1970) and Lord of All I Behold (1971) on the Trailer label. After leaving performing for a time, Robin and Barry reunited to record the album Contrary to Popular Belief in 1977 on the Free Reed label. Through the 1970s Dransfield made appearances at folk festivals around the world, appearing with his brother Barry at the Mariposa Folk Festival in Canada in 1971.
