= Martin Lamble =

English drummer (1949–1969)

- Born: Martin Francis Lamble; 28 August 1949; St John's Wood, London, England
- Died: 12 May 1969 (aged 19) M1 motorway, near Scratchwood Services, Watford, England
- Genres: folk rock
- Instruments: Drums; violin
- Years active: 1966–1969
- Labels: Island Records; Polydor
- Formerly of: Fairport Convention

Martin Francis Lamble (28 August 1949 – 12 May 1969) was an English drummer. He was a member of English folk rock band Fairport Convention, from just after their formation in 1967, until his death in the band's van crash in 1969. He joined the band after attending their first gig and convincing them that he could do a better job than their then drummer, Shaun Frater.

The eldest of three brothers, Martin was educated at Priestmead primary school, Kenton, and later at University College School, Hampstead.

He played on the band's first three albums, but on 12 May 1969, not long after recording Unhalfbricking, Fairport's van crashed on the M1 motorway, near Scratchwood Services, on the way home from a gig at Mothers. Lamble was killed outright in this accident at the age of 19.

He also (along with fellow Fairport members, Simon Nicol, Richard Thompson, and Ashley Hutchings) played on Al Stewart's album Love Chronicles, under the pseudonym Martyn Francis. The album was released in September 1969, four months after Lamble's death.

Martin's younger brother, Graeme Lamble, plays fretless bass guitar in Gypsy jazz group FiddleBop.
