= Ashley Hutchings =

English musician (born 1945)

Ashley Hutchings MBE
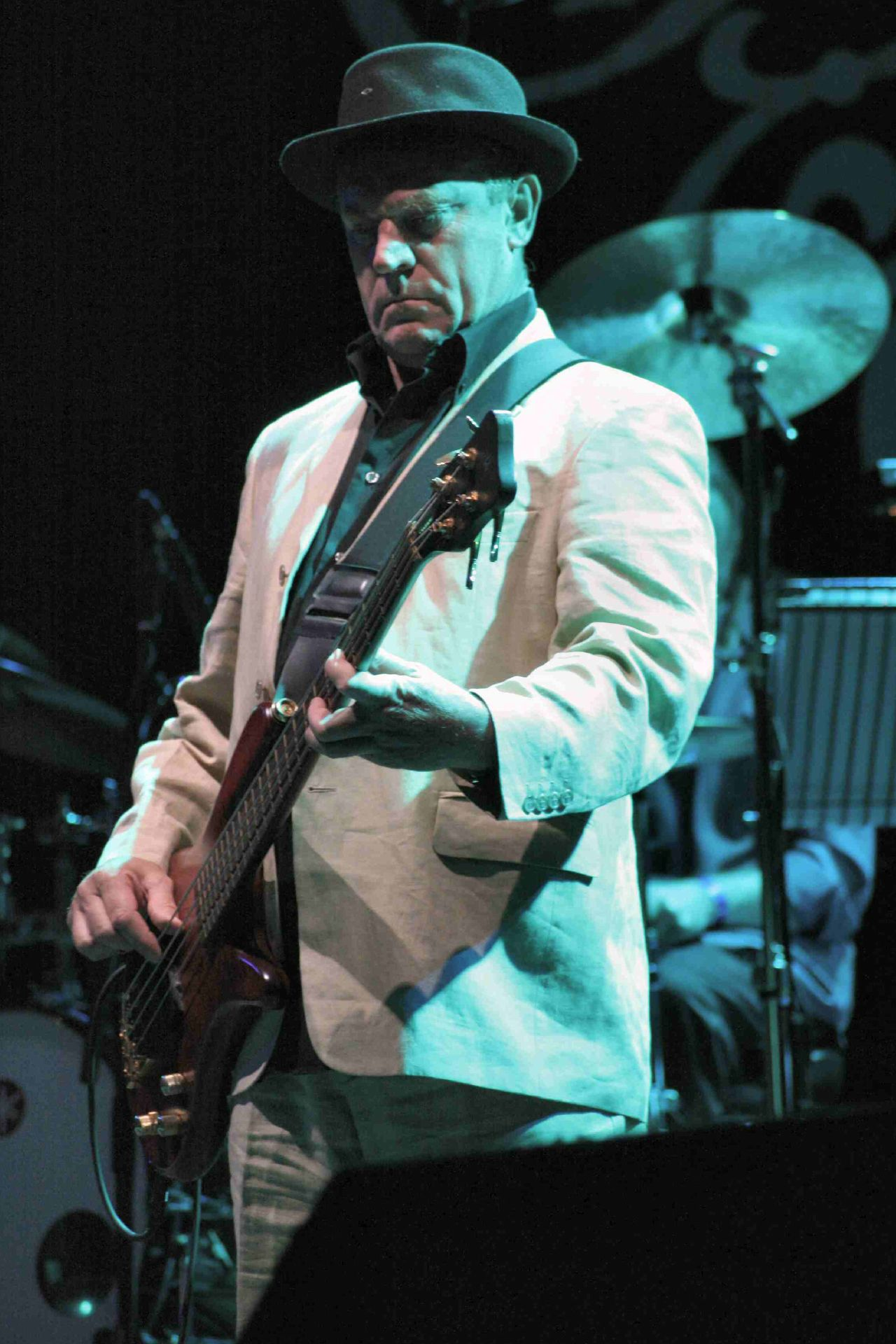
- Hutchings with Fairport Convention; August 2007; Photo: Brian Marks

Background information
- Also known as: The Guv'nor; Tyger
- Born: Ashley Stephen Hutchings; 26 January 1945 (age 81); Southgate, London, England
- Genres: Folk; British folk rock
- Occupations: Musician; songwriter; arranger; bandleader; author; producer
- Instruments: Bass guitar; double bass
- Years active: 1964–present
- Labels: Island; Harvest
- Website: www.ashleyhutchings.com

Ashley Stephen Hutchings (born 26 January 1945), MBE, also known as "Tyger" Hutchings, is an English bassist, songwriter, arranger, band leader, writer and record producer. He was a founding member of three noteworthy English folk-rock bands: Fairport Convention, Steeleye Span and The Albion Band. Hutchings has overseen numerous other projects, including records and live theatre, and has collaborated on film and television projects.

== History ==
=== Early career ===
Hutchings was born in Southgate, London, England, but moved to Muswell Hill while still a child. As a teenager he became involved in the skiffle and blues movements and formed several groups, including 'Dr K's Blues Band' in 1964. He met guitarist Simon Nicol in 1966 when they both played in the 'Ethnic Shuffle Orchestra'. They rehearsed on the floor above Nicol's father's medical practice in a house called "Fairport" that lent its name to the group they formed together as Fairport Convention in 1967 with Richard Thompson, and which soon included Martin Lamble, Judy Dyble and Iain Matthews.

=== Fairport Convention ===
Hutchings played on the band's first four albums. The first three, Fairport Convention (1968), What We Did on Our Holidays (1968) and Unhalfbricking (1969), largely consisted of American singer/songwriter material and original songs in a similar style. Hutchings' restrained but powerful bass style is one of the characteristics of the band in this period. The focus of the band changed with the introduction of Dave Swarbrick into the line up, who brought a virtuosity on the fiddle and a wealth of traditional tunes. This prompted Hutchings to carry out research in the English Folk Dance & Song Society Library at Cecil Sharp House which resulted in the pioneering classic Liege and Lief (1969), seen by many as the foundation of British folk rock. Hutchings was, however, increasingly unhappy with the direction of the band, as most members wanted to return to their older format. As a result, in 1969 he left to focus on more traditional projects.

=== Steeleye Span ===
Hutchings' new band Steeleye Span was formed by putting together two established folk duos Tim Hart and Maddy Prior with Terry and Gay Woods. The Woods departed the band shortly after the release of their debut album, Hark! The Village Wait (1970) and were replaced by singer/guitarist Martin Carthy and fiddler Peter Knight. The resulting line-up toured small concert venues, and released two highly regarded albums Please to See the King (March 1971) and Ten Man Mop, or Mr. Reservoir Butler Rides Again (December 1971), both featuring traditional folk songs and dance tunes with innovative electric arrangements. The bringing in of manager Jo Lustig who pushed for a more commercial sound was probably what prompted the more traditionally minded Carthy and Hutchings to leave the band, which continued with changes of line-up and achieved considerable mainstream success.

=== The Albion Country Band, Morris On and Etchingham Steam Band ===
By this point the ever active Hutchings already had other projects underway. He had gathered together the first incarnation of what has been the major outlet for his work, the Albion Country Band, to provide backing for his then wife Shirley Collins on her solo collection, No Roses (1971). Some of these personnel co-operated with him for the album Morris On (1972), an affectionate electric tribute to Morris Dancing and others joined him in his next project the Etchingham Steam Band from 1974 to 1976. When this dissolved without releasing a record he returned to the Albion Band in 1976, which, with many bewildering line-up changes, continued to record and tour regularly until 2002.

=== Other projects ===
Outside the Albion Band, Hutchings has been a frequent guest on the albums of a wide variety of folk artists. He has also continued to pursue a diversity of projects, some alone and some with groupings of more or less stability and continuity. The Morris On project has spawned several sequels across his career: Son of Morris On (1976), Grandson of Morris On (2002) and Great Grandson of Morris On (2004). There have also been several other dance projects including, with John Kirkpatrick and other artists, The Compleat Dancing Master (1974), Rattlebone & Ploughjack (1976) and Kickin' Up the Sawdust (1977).

In 1984, Hutchings wrote and toured with a one-man show about folk song collector Cecil Sharp, which resulted in the album An Hour with Cecil Sharp and Ashley Hutchings, (1986). From this point he often combined writing and narration with his music, as in By Gloucester Docks I Sat Down and Wept: A Love Story (1987), which was produced as a live show and album in 1990. He produced an album of spoken-word material as A Word in Your Ear (1991) another themed album combining music and narration with Judy Dunlop, as Sway with Me (1991). In the late 1980s he toured with the Ashley Hutchings All Stars, leading to a live album, As You Like It (1988). With Phil Beer and Chris While he provided the sound track for the TV series The Ridge Riders which resulted in an album "Ridgeriders: Songs of the Southern English Landscape" (HTD, 1995), a short tour and another live album Ridgeriders in Concert (Talking Elephant, 1996).

In the 1990s he returned to his own musical roots of skiffle and rock and roll, touring and recording with the Ashley Hutchings Big Beat Combo, which resulted in the album Twangin' and a Traddin' (1994). He also returned to his interest in dance, in addition to continuing the Morris on project, he formed the Ashley Hutchings Dance Band to produce A Batter Pudding for John Keats (1996). Other projects include with Malcolm Rowe, the truly eclectic Folk Your Way to Fitness (1997), Street Cries (2001), and Human Nature (2003).

=== Rainbow Chasers, Albion Christmas and the Lark Rise Band ===
After the suspension of the Albion Band as a full time group in 2002 Hutchings put together another small group of up and coming folk musicians under the title Rainbow Chasers resulting in three albums, Some Colours Fly (2005), A Brilliant Light (2005) and Fortune Never Sleeps (2006). In 2008 he formed The Lark Rise Band to perform and record music from his most successful show, resulting in the album, Lark Rise Revisited (2008). He continues to tour in the Christmas season with the Albion Christmas Band and is plans future projects with ex-Albion Band member Ken Nicol.

=== Recognition ===
His career has been celebrated with the release of archive series, The Guv'nor and Burning Bright (2005) a boxed set of four CDs, which contain many rare and previously unreleased recordings. In 2006 Hutchings received the prestigious Good Tradition trophy at the BBC Radio 2 Folk Awards in recognition of his contributions to the genre and in 2007 he shared the special award for 'Most influential Folk Album of all time' for Liege and Lief.

On 12 December 2013 Hutchings was presented with the Gold Badge Award of the English Folk Dance and Song Society at an Albion Christmas Band concert held at Kings Place, London. He was awarded the MBE in the Queen's Birthday Honours of 2015, for services to folk music.

=== Personal life ===
Hutchings married the British folksinger Shirley Collins in 1971 but divorced around 1978. She has stated that she lost her ability to sing for nearly four decades because of his infidelity.

He and Judy Dunlop have a son, Blair Dunlop, born on 11 February 1992.

== Discography ==
=== Albion Country Band, Albion Dance Band and Albion Band ===
- See The Albion Band

=== Albion Morris ===
- Still Dancing After All These Years (Talking Elephant, 2003)

=== With The Bunch ===
- Rock On - (on one song only) (Island, 1972)

=== Fairport Convention ===
- See Fairport Convention discography

=== Rainbow Chasers ===
- See Rainbow Chasers discography

=== Steeleye Span ===
- See Steeleye Span discography

=== Ashley Hutchings as producer and bass-player ===
- Shirley Collins & The Albion Country Band "No Roses" (Pegasus, 1971)
- Morris On (Island/Carthage, 1972)
- The Compleat Dancing Master – with John Kirkpatrick (Island, 1974)
- Rattlebone & Ploughjack (Island/Beat Goes On, 1976)
- Son of Morris On (Harvest, 1976)
- Kicking Up the Sawdust (Harvest, 1977)
- An Hour with Cecil Sharp and Ashley Hutchings (Dambuster, 1986)
- By Gloucester Docks I Sat Down and Wept (Paradise and Thorns, 1987)
- The Guv'nor (HTD, 1994)
- As You Like It – with the Ashley Hutchings All Stars (HTD, 1994)
- Twangin' and a Traddin' - Ashley Hutchings Big Beat Combo (HTD, 1994)
- The Guv'nor vol 2 (HTD, 1995)
- The Guv'nor vol 3 (Castle, 1995)
- The Guv'nor's Big Birthday Bash (HTD, 1995)
- Ridgeriders: Songs of the Southern English Landscape (HTD, 1995) – with Phil Beer and Chris While
- Ridgeriders in Concert (Talking Elephant, 1996) – with Phil Beer and Chris While
- A Batter Pudding for John Keats – with The Ashley Hutchings Dance Band, (HTD, 1996)
- The Guv'nor vol 4 (Castle, 1996)
- Folk Aerobics (HTD, 1997)
- Along The Downs: The Countryside Collection Album (Mooncrest, 2000)
- Street Cries (Topic, 2001)
- The Guv'nor vol 5 (Talking Elephant, 2002)
- Grandson of Morris On (Talking Elephant, 2002)
- Human Nature (Talking Elephant, 2003)
- As I Cycled Out One May Morning (2003) – with The Cecil Sharpe Centenary Collective'
- Great Grandson of Morris On (Topic, 2004)
- Sway with Me (Talking Elephant, 2005)
- Burning Bright (Free Read, 2005) (box set)
- Morris on the Road (Talking Elephant, 2005)
- The Mother of All Morris (Talking Elephant, 2007)
- Lark Rise Revisited (Talking Elephant, 2008)
- My Land is Your Land – with Ernesto de Pascale (Esoteric, 2009)
- Copper, Russet and Gold – with Ken Nicol (Park Records, 2010)
- Paradise and Thorns: Gloucester Docks Revisited and Other Tales of Love (Talking Elephant, 2018)
