= Fairport's Cropredy Convention appearances =

British folk festival roster

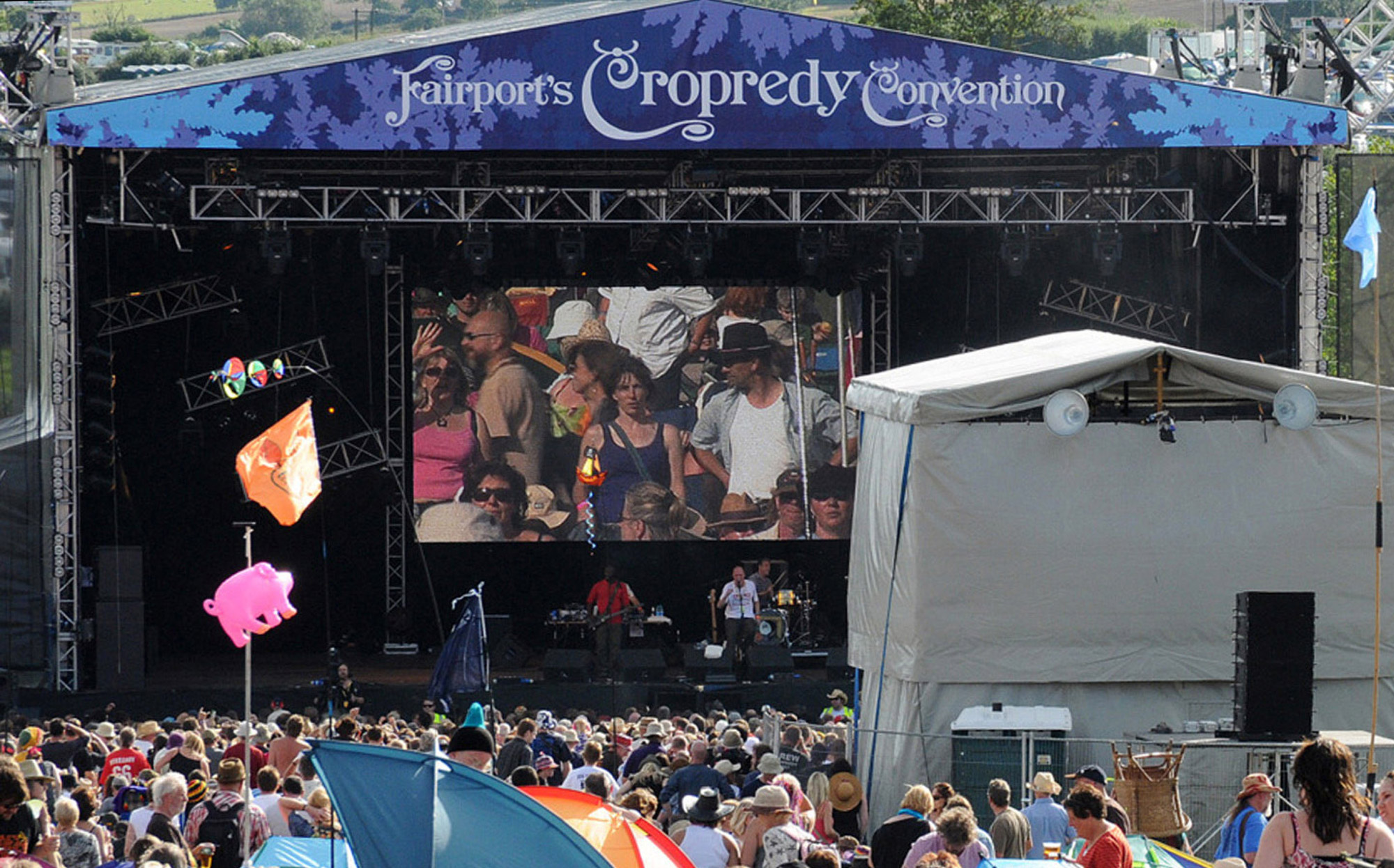
The stage at Fairport's Cropredy Convention

This is a list of artists who have played at the various Fairport Convention Fairport's Cropredy Convention over the years.

Appearances after 2016 can be found in the article Fairport's Cropredy Convention.

== 2025 ==
Thursday 7 August 2025

- Peatbog Faeries
- Albert Lee
- Rosalie Cunningham
- Joe Broughton's Conservatoire Folk Ensemble
- Fairport Acoustic

Friday 8 August 2025

- The Trevor Horn Band
- El Pony Pisador
- Urban Folk Quartet
- City Funk Orchestra
- Skipinnish
- King Pleasure & The Biscuit Boys
- Churchfitters
- Plumhall
- Cropredy Primary School Folk Class

Saturday 9 August 2025

- Fairport Convention & Friends
- Bob Fox & Billy Mitchell
- Martin Barre Band
- The Henry Girls
- Deborah Bonham Band
- The Salts
- Richard Digance

== 2024 ==
Thursday 8 August 2024

- Rick Wakeman & The English Rock Ensemble
- Kathryn Tickell & The Darkening
- Feast Of Fiddles
- Fairport Acoustic

Friday 9 August 2024

- Richard Thompson
- Spooky Mens Chorale
- Big Big Train
- Elles Bailey
- Baskery
- Dewolff
- SilverBlues
- Black Water County

Saturday 10 August 2024

- Fairport Convention & Friends
- Jasper Carrott as Surprise Special Guest
- Eddi Reader
- Focus
- Ranagri
- Richard Digance

== 2023 ==
Thursday 10 August 2023

- Fairport Acoustic
- Merry Hell
- Wilson & Wakeman
- Toyah and Robert Fripp
- Nile Rodgers & Chic
- Carla Fuchs

Friday 11 August 2023

- Joshua Burnell
- Kiki Dee & Carmello Luggeri
- Peat & Diesel
- Easy Star All-Stars
- Richie Owens & The Farm Bureau
- Strawbs
- Fisherman's Friends
- 10cc
- Sin'Dogs

Saturday 12 August 2023

- Richard Digance
- Morganway
- Beans On Toast
- Solstice
- The Young'uns
- Gilbert O'Sullivan
- Fairport Convention

== 2022 ==
Thursday 11 August 2022

- Fairport Convention Acoustic
- Thumping Tommys
- Edward II
- Clannad
- The Trevor Horn Band

Friday 12 August 2022

- Maddie Morris
- Emily Barker
- Home Service
- Martyn Joseph
- Slambovian Circus of Dreams
- Sharon Shannon
- Turin Brakes
- Steve Hackett-Genesis Revisited

Saturday 13 August 2022

- Seth Lakeman
- Holy Moly & The Crackers
- The Bar-Steward Sons of Val Doonican
- Rosalie Cunningham
- Matthews Southern Comfort
- Richard Thompson
- Fairport Convention & Friends

== 2021 ==
Cancelled due to Coronavirus pandemic

== 2020 ==
Cancelled due to Coronavirus pandemic

== 2016 ==
Thursday 11 August 2016

- Fairport Acoustic Convention
- Gryphon
- CoCo and the Butterfields
- Hayseed Dixie
- Madness

Friday 12 August 2016

- Anthony John Clarke and Dave Pegg
- Brìghde Chaimbeul
- Sound of the Sirens
- Lifesigns
- Wille and the Bandits
- Headspace
- Steeleye Span
- The Bootleg Beatles

Saturday 13 August 2016

- Richard Digance
- Maia
- Gilmore & Roberts
- Pierce Brothers
- The Demon Barbers XL
- Babylon Circus
- Ralph McTell
- Fairport Convention & Friends

== 2015 ==
Thursday 13 August 2015

- Fairport Acoustic Convention
- Trad Arrr
- Dreadzone
- Katzenjammer
- Emmylou Harris and Rodney Crowell

Friday 14 August 2015

- Talisk
- ahab
- Judith Owen
- Skinny Lister
- Skerryvore
- Fish
- The Proclaimers
- Level 42

Saturday 15 August 2015

- Richard Digance
- Kevin Dempsey and Rosie Carson
- The Newgrass Cutters
- Band of Friends
- Toyah Willcox
- Paul Carrack
- Iain Matthews and Egbert Derix
- Fairport Convention & Friends

== 2014 ==
Thursday 7 August 2014

- Fairport Acoustic Convention
- Joe Broughton's Conservatoire Folk Ensemble
- Capercaillie
- Steve Hackett – Genesis Extended
- The Waterboys

Friday 8 August 2014

- The Mischa MacPherson Trio
- Deborah Rose
- Edwina Hayes
- Benjamin Folke Thomas
- Churchfitters
- The Travelling Band
- The Wonder Stuff
- Chas & Dave
- The Australian Pink Floyd Show

Saturday 9 August 2014

- Richard Digance
- Blackbeard's Tea Party
- Reg Meuross
- Treetop Flyers
- Cara Dillon
- Marillion
- Al Stewart
- Fairport Convention & Friends

== 2013 ==
Thursday 8 August 2013

- Fairport Acoustic Convention
- Fake Thackray
- Romeo's Daughter
- Edward II
- Alice Cooper

Friday 9 August 2013

- BBC YFA Winners – Greg Russell and Ciaran Algar
- Danny and the Champions of the World
- Kathryn Roberts and Sean Lakeman
- Moulettes
- Lúnasa
- Martin Barre's New Day
- Levellers
- 10cc

Saturday 10 August 2013

- Richard Digance
- Mediæval Bæbes
- Brooks Williams
- The Dunwells
- Peatbog Faeries
- Nik Kershaw
- Fairport Convention & Friends: Martin Barre, Tom Robinson, James Wood, Pat O'May, Nik Kershaw, Kellie While

== 2012 ==
Thursday 9 August 2012

- Fairport Acoustic Convention
- Kieran Goss
- Legend
- Bellowhead
- Squeeze

Friday 10 August 2012

- BBC YFA Winners – Ioscaid
- Ellen & The Escapades
- Dead Flamingoes (feat. Kami Thompson & James Walbourne)
- Tarras
- Larkin Poe
- Saw Doctors
- Richard Thompson
- Joan Armatrading

Saturday 11 August 2012

- Richard Digance
- Morris On
- Brother & Bones
- Calan
- Big Country as "Special Guests"
- Dennis Locorriere
- Fairport Convention & Friends: Ashley Hutchings – Bass; Richard Thompson – Guitar: Jerry Donahue – Guitar: Maartin Allcock – Guitar, Keys; Dave Mattacks – Drums, Keys; Dave Swarbrick – Fiddle, Mandolin; Kami Thompson – Vocals; Kristina Donahue – Vocals; Blair Dunlop – Guitar, Vocals; Rebecca Lovell – Mandolin, Vocals; Megan Lovell – Lap Steel, Vocals

== 2011 ==
Thursday 11 August 2011

- Fairport Acoustic Convention with Joe Brown
- Katriona Gilmore & Jamie Roberts
- Blair Dunlop
- Home Service
- Hayseed Dixie
- UB40

Friday 12 August 2011

- BBC YFA Winners – Moore, Moss, Rutter
- The Travelling Band
- Steve Tilston & The Durbervilles
- Charlie Dore
- The Dylan Project
- The Urban Folk Quartet
- The Coral
- Seasick Steve

Saturday 13 August 2011

- Richard Digance
- The Shee
- The Blockheads
- Lau
- Horslips as "Very Special Guests"
- Badly Drawn Boy
- Fairport Convention & Friends: Ralph McTell, P J Wright, Alan Bond, Ahab, Joe Brown, Nigel Schofield

== 2010 ==
Thursday August 12

- Keith Donnelly & Flossie Malavialle
- Leatherat
- Thea Gilmore
- Pauline Black of The Selecter
- Status Quo

Friday August 13

- The Tindalls
- Martin Taylor's Spirit of Django
- Mabon
- 3 Daft Monkeys
- Little Johnny England
- The Dixie Bee-Liners
- Little Feat
- Bellowhead

Saturday August 14

- Richard Digance
- Breabach
- ahab
- Easy Star All Stars
- Rick Wakeman & The English Rock Ensemble
- Martyn Joseph
- Fairport Convention & Friends (including excerpts from the Rock Opera Excalibur): Dave Swarbrick, Alan Simon, Pat O'May, Martin Barre, Johnny Logan, James Wood, Luc Bertin, Conan Mevel, Jacqui McShee, Edmund Whitcomb

== 2009 ==
Thursday August 13

- Harlequinn
- 4 Square
- Nicol & Cool
- Buzzcocks
- Steve Winwood

Friday August 14

- ColvinQuarmby
- Megan & Joe Henwood
- Scott Matthews
- Ade Edmondson & The Bad Shepherds
- John Jorgensen Band
- The Dodge Brothers
- Richard Thompson
- Seth Lakeman

Saturday August 15

- Richard Digance
- Churchfitters
- Feast of Fiddles
- Dreadzone
- Nik Kershaw
- Ralph McTell
- Fairport Convention & Friends: Sid Kipper (Chris Sugden), Tommy Connolly Dancers, Mike Rowbottom, Maartin Allcock, Mick & Jane Toole, Yusuf (Cat Stevens), Alun Davies, Richard Thompson, Kamil Thompson, The GP's, Ralph McTell, Dave Mattacks

== 2008 ==
Thursday August 7

- Whapweasel
- Anthony John Clarke
- The Gathering
- John Tams and Barry Coope
- Supergrass

Friday August 8

- The Family Mahone
- Peggy & PJ Wright
- 3 Daft Monkeys
- Siobhan Miller & Jeana Leslie (BBC Radio 2 Young Folk Award winners)
- Stackridge
- Paul Brady and his band
- Joe Brown and his band featuring special guest Dave Edmunds
- Levellers

Saturday August 9

- Richard Digance
- Lark Rise to Candleford featuring Ashley Hutchings
- Legend (Bob Marley tribute)
- The Muffinmen featuring Jimmy Carl Black
- The Julie Fowlis Band
- Midge Ure
- Fairport Convention & Friends: Midge Ure, Tommy Connolly Dancers, Vikki Clayton, Maartin Allcock, Edmund Whitcombe, Julie Fowlis, Ashley Hutchings, Chris While, Jerry Donahue, Kellie While, Robert Plant, Kristina Donahue, Simon Care, Nigel Schofield, Geoffrey Hughes.

== 2007 ==
40th Anniversary Year

Thursday August 9

- Anthony John Clarke
- Kerfuffle
- Wishbone Ash
- Seth Lakeman
- The Jools Holland's Rhythm and Blues Orchestra

Friday August 10

- Hummingbird
- Mad Agnes
- The Demon Barbers Roadshow
- Last Orders
- Viva Santana
- Show of Hands
- Fairport 1969 perform Liege and Lief
- The Richard Thompson Band

Saturday August 11

- Richard Digance
- Give Way
- The Bucket Boys
- Iain Matthews
- Strawbs
- Billy Mitchell and Bob Fox
- Fairport Convention & Friends: Richard Thompson, Maartin Allcock, Tommy Connolly Dancers, Dave Mattacks, Iain Matthews, Judy Dyble, Dave Swarbrick, Vikki Clayton, Ashley Hutchings, Vo Fletcher, Beth Gibbins

== 2006 ==
Thursday August 10

- wRants
- PJ Wright
- Feast of Fiddles
- Chris Newman & Maire Ni Chathasaigh
- Steeleye Span

Friday August 11

- Shameless Quo
- Bodega (Radio 2 Young Folk Award winner)
- Then Came The Wheel
- Ashley Hutchings' Rainbow Chasers
- The Deborah Bonham Band
- Flook
- John Martyn Band
- 10cc featuring Graham Gouldman and friends

Saturday August 12

- Richard Digance
- Sam Holmes
- Swarb's Lazarus
- King Pleasure and the Biscuit Boys
- Dervish
- Glenn Tilbrook
- Fairport Convention & Friends: Glen Tillbrook, Tommy Connolly Dancers, Maartin Allcock, Edmund Whitcombe, Ashley Hutchings, Chris While

== 2005 ==
Thursday August 11

- Tickled Pink
- Simon Mayor and Hilary James
- Jah Wobble
- Country Joe McDonald and his band

Friday August 12

- Big Eyed Fish
- Bob Fox performs solo
- Stuey Mutch with Henry Nicol
- Edwina Hayes
- Chris While and Julie Matthews
- The Muffin Men with Jimmy Carl Black
- The Ukulele Orchestra of Great Britain
- Richard Thompson
- The Dylan Project

Saturday August 13

- Richard Digance
- T & Latouche
- Uiscedwr
- The Hamsters
- Beth Nielsen Chapman
- Fairport Convention & Friends: Anna Ryder, Vo Fletcher, Tommy Connolly Dancers, Maartin Allcock, Edmund Whitcombe, Richard Thompson, Beth Nielsen Chapman, Pete Zorn, Christine Collister, Jacqui McShee, Ashley Hutchings

== 2004 ==
Thursday 12 August

- Blue Meanies
- Mostly Autumn
- Jackie Leven and Michael Cosgrove
- Oysterband

Friday 13 August

- Earl Okin
- Andy Guttridge Band
- Family Mahone
- Anna Ryder/Steve Tilston Band with Maart Allcock and Clive Bunker
- Jerry Donahue Band
- Show of Hands
- Jethro Tull

Saturday 14 August

- Richard Digance
- Tiny Tin Lady
- The Mighty Firebirds
- Jez Lowe and The Bad Pennies
- Ashley Hutchings Morris On
- Nick Harper
- Fairport Convention & Friends: Jerry Donahue, Maartin Allcock, Ralph McTell, Ashley Hutchings, Jacqui McShee, Steve Tilston, Anna Ryder, Simon Care, Tommy Connolly Dancers, Jay Turner, Cath Mundy, Martin Barre, Ben Bennion, Mick Bullard, Bruce Lacey, Edmund Whitcombe

== 2003 ==
Thursday 7 August

- Colvin Quarmby
- Meet on the Ledge
- Trevor Burton Band
- Lindisfarne

Friday 8 August

- Mark Gillespie
- Keith Donnelly
- Equation
- David Hughes
- Bucket Boys
- Blue Tapestry
- Procol Harum

Saturday 9 August

- Richard Digance
- Al Hodge and The Mechanics
- The Hush
- Old Blind Dogs
- Albert Lee
- Dennis Locorriere
- Paul Mitchell singing Sinatra Songbook
- Fairport Convention & Friends: Andy Guttridge, Steve Gibbons, P.J. Wright, Martin Carthy, Maartin Allcock, Dave Swarbrick, Meg Burnham, Mike Burnham, Kevin Dempsey, Beryl Marriott, John Kirkpatrick, Jacqui McShee, Anna Ryder, David Hughes, Ralph McTell, Norma Waterson, Tommy Connolly Dancers

== 2002 ==
The 35th anniversary event.

Thursday 8 August

- Freeway Jam
- The Joyce Gang
- The Dubliners
- e2K

Friday 9 August

- Mundy-Turner
- Sarah Jory
- Magna Carta
- Oysterband
- Broderick
- Richard Thompson
- Fairport Convention "The Early Years" featuring: Ashley Hutchings, Simon Nicol, Richard Thompson, Gerry Conway, Dave Swarbrick, Jerry Donahue, Iain Matthews & guests: Vikki Clayton, George Galt, Anna Ryder, Marc Ellington, Joe Boyd

Saturday 10 August

- Richard Digance
- Little Johnny England
- Eddi Reader
- Deborah Bonham
- The Alison Brown Quartet
- Fairport Convention featuring: Simon Nicol, Dave Pegg, Ric Sanders, Chris Leslie, Gerry Conway, Dave Swarbrick, Richard Thompson, Ashley Hutchings, Iain Matthews, Jerry Donahue, Maartin Allcock; & Friends: Anna Ryder, Andrew Cronshaw, Neil Wayne, Ian Blake, Fraser Spiers, Tom Farnell, Roger Hill, Marc Ellington, Eddi Reader, Vikki Clayton, Ralph McTell, Chris Parkinson, Tommy Connolly Dancers, Terry Paine, Geoffrey Hughes, Blair Dunlop, Bob Fox, Kristina Donahue, John Jones

== 2001 ==
Thursday 9 August

- Tarras
- Steve Ashley & Friends
- The Dylan Project
- Lonnie Donegan

Friday 10 August

- Sandwitch
- Whirligig
- Keith Donnelly & Guests
- Chris While & Julie Matthews
- Sugarland Slim
- The Eliza Carthy Band
- Musafir
- De Dannan

Saturday 11 August

- Chuckletruck
- Vikki Clayton & Friends
- Five Furious Fish
- Francis Dunnery & The Grass Virgins
- Amos Garrett
- Brass Monkey
- Fairport Convention & Friends: Maartin Allcock, Vikki Clayton, Ashley Hutchings, Steve Tilston, Anna Ryder, Chris Knibbs, Chas McDevitt, Kate Luxmoore, Chris While, Julie Matthews, Beryl & Roger Marriott, Dave Swarbrick, Tommy Connolly Dancers, Ian Anderson, Geoffrey Hughes, Martin Carthy, Norma Waterson, Jacqui McShee, David Hughes, Fraser Nimmo, Paul Kovits, Keith Donnelly.

== 2000 ==
Thursday 10 August

- Spank the Monkey
- Incredible String Band
- All About Eve

Friday 11 August

- Keith Donnelly
- Little Johnny England
- Iain Matthews & Andy Roberts
- The Backroom Boys
- The Albion Band
- Priory of Brion

Saturday 12 August

- The Unprofessionals
- Bob Fox
- Stackridge
- The Hamsters
- Show of Hands
- Fairport Convention & Friends: Geoffrey Hughes, Maartin Allcock, Jerry Donahue, Kristina Donahue, Ashley Hutchings, Iain Matthews, Eddi Reader, Dave Swarbrick, Martin Carthy, Bob Fox, Roger Hodgson, Alan Simon, Alan Thomson, Steve Gibbons, Jacqui McShee, Beryl Marriott

== 1999 ==
Friday 13 August

- Blazing Homesteads
- Chris While & Julie Maththews
- Jacqui McShee's Pentangle
- Kevin Dempsey & Dave Swarbrick
- The Dylan Project
- The Richard Thompson Band
- Barrage

Saturday 14 August

- Barrage
- Anna Ryder
- The Paul Mitchell Band
- Ralph McTell
- The Robbie McIntosh Band
- Maddy Prior and Friends
- Fairport Convention and Friends: Steve Ashley, Tom Leary, Gareth Turner, Tommy Connolly Dancers, Anna Ryder, Jerry Donahue, Maartin Allcock, Kristina Donahue, Dave Swarbrick, Maddy Prior, Jacqui McShee, Richard Thompson, David Hughes, Eddi Reader

== 1998 ==
Friday 14 August

- Anna Ryder
- Stringthing
- Solstice
- Vikki Clayton Band
- Fling
- Edward II
- Rory McLeod
- Roy Wood's Army

Saturday 15 August

- The Tabs
- Waz
- Cat Scratch Fever
- Rory McLeod
- Hank Wangford and the Lost Cowboys
- Loudon Wainwright III
- Fairport Convention & Friends: Loudon Wainwright III, Pete Zorn, Tommy Connolly Dancers, Anna Ryder, Rabbit Bundrick, David Hughes, Jacqui McShee, Matt Pegg, Maartin Allcock, Dave Cousins, Chris While, P.J. Wright, Steve Gibbons

== 1997 ==
Friday 8 August

- Pressgang
- Kristina Olsen
- The Julian Dawson Band
- Osibisa
- Fairport Convention
- The Saw Doctors

Saturday 9 August

- Tempest
- Huw and Tony Williams
- Eliza Carthy with the Kings of Calicutt
- John Otway and Wild Willy Barrett
- Fairport Convention & Friends: Richard Thompson, Ashley Hutchings, Dave Swarbrick, Jerry Donahue, Ralph McTell, Bruce Rowland, Maartin Allcock, Dan Ar Braz, Vikki Clayton, Cathy Lesurf.

== 1996 ==
Friday 9 August

- Superjam
- Clarion
- Chris Leslie and Beryl Marriott
- Edward II
- The Richard Thompson Band

Saturday 10 August

- Superjam
- The King Earl Boogie Band
- David Hughes and Gerry Conway
- The Atlantic Wave Band
- The Hellecasters
- Show of Hands
- Joe Brown and His Band
- Fairport Convention & Friends: Dave Swarbrick, Jerry Donahue, Allan Taylor, Sam Brown, Richard Thompson

== 1995 ==
Friday 11 August

- Eden Burning
- The Kathryn Tickell Band
- Procol Harum

Saturday 12 August

- Waulk Elektrik
- Huw and Tony Williams
- The Poozies
- The Nerve
- Wild Willy Barrett
- The Hamsters
- Richard Thompson with Danny Thompson
- Fairport Convention & Friends: The Roy Wood Big Band, Joe Brown, Jerry Donahue, Chris Leslie, Neil Gordon, Gill And Bobbi from Nice Girls Don't Explode, Spencer Richards, Richard Thompson, Tom Farnell.

== 1994 ==
Friday 12 August

- Tower Struck Down
- Roy Harper
- Lindisfarne

Saturday 13 August

- Too Cool For Shorts
- Shave The Monkey
- Man
- Horch
- Blodwyn Pig
- The Vin Garbutt Band
- Fairport Convention & Friends: Vikki Clayton, Chris While, Gerry Conway, Roy Harper

== 1993 ==
Friday 13 August

- Clarion
- Richard Thompson & Danny Thompson
- The Leningrad Cowboys

Saturday 14 August

- The Buttermountain Boys
- Robin Williamson
- The Martin Barre Band
- Stockton's Wing
- Fallen Angels
- Fairport Convention & Guests: Roy Wood, Robert Plant, Vikki Clayton, Heather Wood, Everything but the Girl, Matt Pegg, Jerry Donahue, Bryn Haworth, Chris Leslie, Ashley Reed, Ian Cutler, Tom Leary, Ben Bennion

== 1992 ==
Friday 14 August

- The Wright Brothers
- Richard Thompson
- Fairport Convention & Friends: Julianne Regan, Chris Leslie, Robert Plant

Saturday 15 August

- Skin The Peeler
- The Backroom Boys
- Four Men And A Dog
- Wolfstone
- Swarbrick And Carthy
- Fairport Convention & Friends: Ralph McTell, Julianne Regan, Bruce Rowland, Dave Swarbrick, Vikki Clayton, Gerry Conway, Heather Wood, Geoff Hughes, Bryn Haworth, Richard Thompson, Jerry Donahue, Billy Bragg, Ashley Hutchings

== 1991 ==
Friday 16 August

- Freeway Jam
- Eugene Wallace
- Storm
- The Richard Thompson Band

Saturday 17 August

- Blinder
- Jay Turner
- The Poor Mouth
- The Steve Gibbons Band
- Whippersnapper
- Alias Ron Kavana
- Dan Ar Braz
- Fairport Convention & Friends: Andy Fairweather Low, Richard Thompson, Julianne Regan, Vikki Clayton, Chris Leslie, Dan Ar Braz, Beryl And Roger Marriott, Anthony Thistlethwaite, Gerry Conway, Jerry Donahue, The Cropredy Horns!

== 1990 ==
Friday 17 August

- Avalon
- Ralph McTell
- The Bootleg Beatles

Saturday 18 August

- The Banana Band
- Kieran Halpin
- The Julian Dawson Band
- The Albion Band
- Blues n Trouble
- The Fureys & Davey Arthur
- Richard Thompson
- Fairport Convention & Friends: Julianne Regan, Vikki Clayton, Ralph McTell, Gerry Conway, B.J. Cole, Doane Perry, Francis Dunnery with Blinder, Jerry Donahue, Gary Brooker, Matt Pegg

== 1989 ==
Friday 18 August

- The Breakers
- Zumzeaux
- Steeleye Span

Saturday 19 August

- The Elaine Morgan Band
- After Hours
- Climax Blues Band
- Sally Barker
- All About Eve
- Richard Thompson
- Fairport Convention & Friends; Ian Anderson, Steve Harley, Gary Brooker, Julianne Regan, Mike Read, Richard Thompson, Bruce Rowland, Sheila And Sheryl Parker, Chris Leslie, Fergus Feely, Dave Swarbrick, Gerry Conway, Martin Barre, Mark Tucker, Nigel Seymour, Tim Bricheno, Danny Thompson, Jerry Donahue.

== 1988 ==
Friday 12 August

- Collaboration
- Mike Silver
- The Richard Thompson Band

Saturday 13 August

- The Kursaal Flyers
- Sally Barker
- Filarfolket
- The Steve Gibbons Band
- Dan Ar Braz' Electric Band
- Fairport Convention & Friends: Richard Thompson, Jerry Donahue, Sheila And Sheryl Parker, Tim German, Diz Disley

== 1987 ==
Friday 7 August

- Le Rue
- Gordon Giltrap
- John Martyn & Danny Thompson

Saturday 8 August

- The Steve Ashley Band
- Mara!
- Chicken Shack
- Muzsikás
- Whippersnapper
- Richard Thompson
- Fairport Convention & Friends: June Tabor, Cathy Lesurf, Ian Anderson, Martin Barre

== 1986 ==
Friday 8 August

- Kieran Halpin with Maartin Allcock & Manus Lunny
- Mike Elliott
- The Richard Thompson Band

Saturday 9 August

- The Electric Bluebirds
- The Jon Strong Band
- The Sutherland Brothers
- Brass Monkey
- Dick Gaughan
- Fairport Convention & Friends: Ian Matthews, Robert Plant, Cathy Lesurf, Richard Thompson, Clive Gregson, Christine Collister, Mike Silver, Jerry Donahue, Bill Zorn

== 1985 ==
Friday 9 August

- No Right Turn
- Neil Innes
- Fairport Convention (Full House lineup)

Saturday 10 August

- Jon Benns
- John James Band with Dick Heckstall-Smith
- Mosaic
- Balham Alligators
- Whippersnapper
- The Home Service
- Robin Williamson
- Fairport Convention & Friends: Billy Connolly, Richard Thompson, Cathy Lesurf, Ralph McTell, Trevor Lucas, Jerry Donahue

== 1984 ==
Friday 10 August

- Ragged Heroes
- Bob Davenport
- Adrian Legg
- Steeleye Span

Saturday 11 August

- The Oyster Band with Cathy Lesurf
- Ian Campbell
- Garsters Dream Band
- Allan Taylor
- Pyewackett
- Ian Campbell
- Whippersnapper
- The Battlefield Band
- Richard Digance
- Fairport Convention & Friends: Cathy Lesurf, Wally Whyton, Matt Pegg, Ian & Lorna Campbell, Bob Davenport

== 1983 ==
Friday 12 August

- Easvesdropper
- Jon Benns
- Richard Thompson Big Band

Saturday 13 August

- Blowzabella
- Jon Benns
- Eclipse
- Carrig
- Arizona Smoke Review
- Maxi & Mitch
- Albion Band
- Vin Garbutt
- Fairport Convention & Friends: Cathy Lesurf, Dave Mattacks, Ashley Hutchings, Richard Thompson, Paul Mitchell (harmonica), Linda Thompson, Alastair Anderson, Andy (of the Marksmen), Dave Whetstone

== 1982 ==
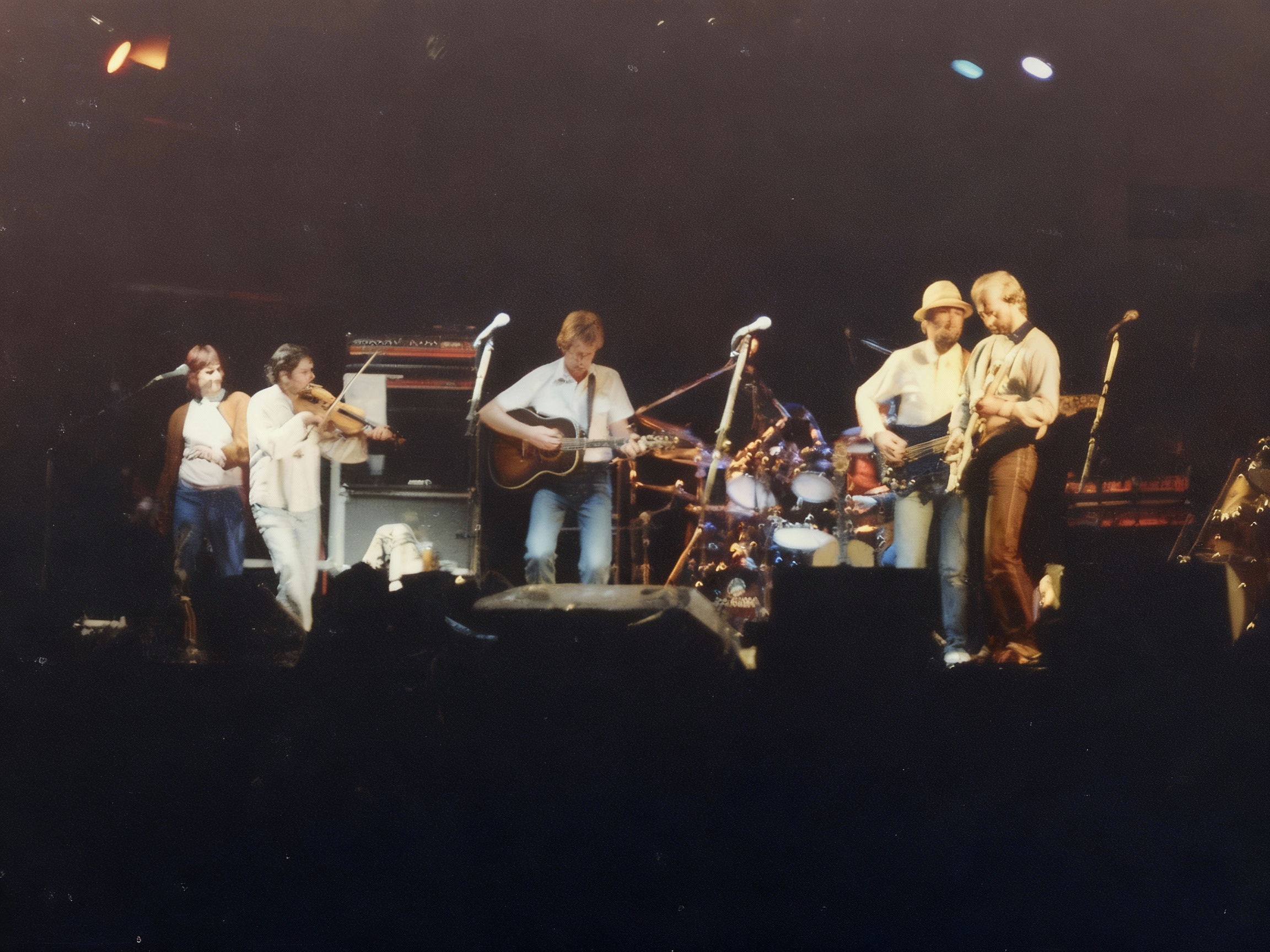
The Fairport "Nine" line-up, performing at Cropredy 1982

Friday 13 August

- Knacker's Yard
- Dan Ar Braz
- Fairport Convention Performing "Babbacombe Lee"
- The Home Service

Saturday 14 August

- Captains Coco's Country Dance Band
- Bob Fox and Stu Luckley
- Dan Ar Braz
- Professor Bruce Lacey
- Maddy Prior Band
- Fairport Convention & Friends: Trevor Lucas, Jerry Donahue, Dave Mattacks, Linda Thompson

== 1981 ==
Note: this festival was held at Broughton Castle.

Friday 14 August

- The Sussex Trug Band
- Simon & Andrew Loake
- Ralph McTell, Richard Thompson, Dave Pegg & Dave Mattacks – The GPs

Saturday 15 August

- Captains Coco's Country Dance Band
- Steve Ashley & Chris Leslie
- Earl Okin
- The Bert Jansch Group
- Martin Carthy & John Kirkpatrick
- Fairport Convention & Friends: Richard Thompson, Judy Dyble

== 1980 ==
Note: this was the first official Reunion Festival.

Friday 30 August

- Captains Coco's Country Dance Band
- John Kirkpatrick and Sue Harris
- Richard & Linda Thompson
- Fairport Convention & Friends: Ralph McTell, Richard Thompson, Linda Thompson, Dave Mattacks, Robert Jordan

== 1979 ==
Note: this was the official "Farewell" concert.

Saturday 4 August

- Bag O'Nails
- The Kitchen Band
- The Rollright Stones
- Graham Smiths Greek Section
- The Tanglefoot Band
- Simon & Andrew Loake
- Steve Ashley & Chris Leslie
- Earl Okin
- Tony O'Leary
- Fairport Convention with special guest: Ralph McTell

== 1976 to 1978 ==
The first Fairport Convention concert held in Cropredy was in the back garden of a friend's house, on Saturday 17 July 1976. Although it was a private concert, there was an attendance of 750. It then became established as an annual event; from 1977, tickets were sold; in 1978, a larger site was used.
