= Rosalie Deighton =

- Born: 26 July 1976 (age 50); Breda, Netherlands
- Origin: Barnsley, South Yorkshire, England
- Occupation: Singer-songwriter
- Formerly of: The Deighton Family
- Website: www.rosaliedeighton.com

Rosalie Deighton (born 26 July 1976) is an English and Dutch singer and songwriter.

== Early life ==
Deighton was born in Breda, Netherlands to an Indonesian mother, Josie and to a British father, Dave Deighton. The family moved to Barnsley, South Yorkshire when Rosalie was eight years old.

== Career ==
=== The Deighton Family ===
Together with her siblings and both parents, Deighton performed as part of the Deighton Family on albums Mama Was Right (1990), Acoustic Music Meant to Suit Most Occasions (1988) and Rolling Home (1991).

=== "Intuition" (1993) ===
In 1993, Deighton and her sister Kathleen recorded an album, Intuition, along with Kate Rusby, Kathryn Roberts, Julie Matthews and Pat Shaw. The album was released on the Fat Cat Label.

=== Solo work ===
As a solo artist, Deighton has released three albums and provided backing vocals on Paddy Casey's album Living. The album was the second-highest selling Irish album of 2004.

Deighton's first solo album, Truth Drug, debuted in 2001, followed by 21 Days on the Echo label in 2007.

Her latest album, Burning Boat, was released in 2014. Recorded at the Bearclaw Records Studio facility in Deighton's hometown of Barnsley, South Yorkshire, it was produced by Rick Barraclough. The album features guest appearances from Jack Savoretti and M. G. Boulter. It was Bearclaw's first album release.

=== Other appearances ===
In addition to performing with The Storys and as one half of the celebrated duo Balsamo/Deighton, Deighton has been an occasional guest ‘Champ’ in the band Danny and the Champions of the World. She was featured on two albums, Hearts & Arrows (2011) and the critically acclaimed Stay True, (2013) both on Loose Music.
