= Melanie Harrold =

British singer-songwriter

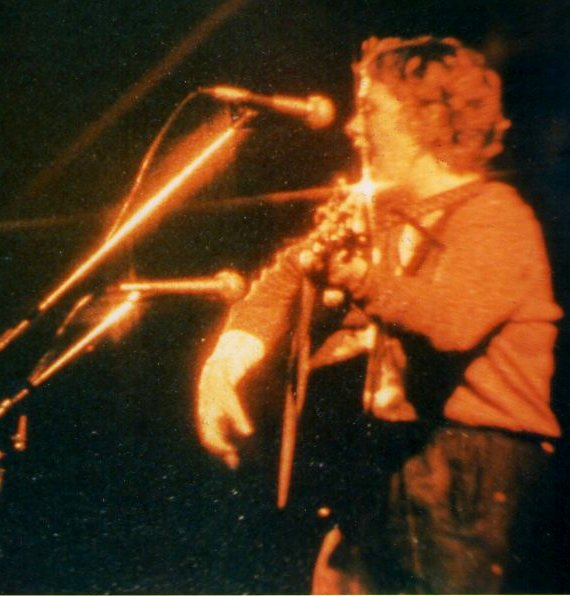
- Melanie on-stage 1980

Background information
- Born: 5 May 1951 (age 75); Cornwall, England
- Genres: Folk, country
- Occupations: Musician, songwriter
- Instruments: Vocals, guitar,
- Years active: 1968–present
- Label: DJM

Melanie Harrold (born 5 May 1951) is a British singer-songwriter, best known for her 1970s albums for DJM (Fancy That and Blue Angel) plus recording with Gerry Rafferty, and singing with Hank Wangford.In her early career, and even for her first album (Fancy That), she went under the name Joanna Carlin, so as not to be confused with the other singer Melanie.

== Biography ==
Harrold worked the folk clubs where she met Jasper Carrott. When Carrott got a recording contract with DJM Records, it led to her also being signed up by the company.

The Fancy That LP was released in 1977, with Blue Angel released in 1979, under her real name. As she was singing backing vocals on Gerry Rafferty's albums including City to City, she was able to use his backing band and producer Hugh Murphy to work on her albums.

In 1979 she toured as a member of The Albion Band and as such was featured in an edition of the BBC TV Arena arts programme which included live footage of the band performing at The Hexagon in Reading, Berkshire, recorded in June 1979.

In the 1980s, she fronted the comedy country The Hank Wangford Band. She went under the name Irma Cetas ("the Vera Lynn of the North Sea Oilfields").

She also recorded the song "Holy Horses" on the Lovely in the Dances (Songs of Sydney Carter) album, originally released in 1981 (and re-released on CD in 2009). The album featured artists such as Maddy Prior (whom Harrold toured with), Shusha and John Kirkpatrick.

In 1988 she released an album, Live in the City, with double-bass player Olly Blanchflower.

In the 1990s she released two albums (The Last Leviathan and Instinctive Behaviour) with Olly Blanchflower.

She was also involved with the album Daphne's Flight, a 1996 collaboration between five female vocalists, instrumentalists and songwriters in the British folk and roots music scene: Christine Collister, Melanie Harrold, Julie Matthews, Helen Watson and Chris While. The collaboration resulted in a sell-out tour. On the album, Harrold sang lead on the opening track "Over And Over" (her own composition from the Instinctive Behaviour album) and "The Letter".

In recent years she has concentrated on choir work, including developing the Trade Winds, Raise The Roof, and Vocal Chords choirs.

== Discography ==
- Fancy That (1977) – DJM Records
- Blue Angel (1978) – DJM Records
- Live in the City (1988) – Olanie Music (with Olly Blanchflower)
- The Last Leviathan (1990) – Olanie Music (with Olly Blanchflower)
- Instinctive Behaviour (1993) – Olanie Music (with Olly Blanchflower)
- Live (2013) – Big Village Records
