= The Urban Folk Quartet =

- Genre: Folk
- Years active: 2009–present
- Labels: Fellside Recordings; SAE Records
- Members: Joe Broughton; Paloma Trigás; Tom Chapman; Dan Walsh
- Past members: Frank Moon
- Website: theufq.com

The Urban Folk Quartet (commonly known as The UFQ or simply UFQ) are a four-piece contemporary folk band launched in June 2009. The band is composed of Joe Broughton (Fiddle, Guitar, Mandolin), Paloma Trigás (Fiddle, Vocals), Tom Chapman (Cajón, Percussion, Vocals) and Dan Walsh (Banjo, Guitar, Vocals). To date, the band has released four studio albums and three live albums.

== History ==
Active since 2009, on their fourth outing as a band they won the Spanish International Folk Competition.

In 2010, they played at Sidmouth Folk Festival Fringe, The Big Chill Festival and Moseley Folk Festival. Their self-titled debut album was released through Fellside Recordings in 2010 and they won The Hancock Award for Best Newcomer.

In 2011, they appeared at Islands Folk Festival in Canada, Sidmouth Folk Festival Fringe and Fairport's Cropredy Convention. The band also released a live album, The Urban Folk Quartet: Live, to coincide with their appearance at Fairport's Cropredy Convention. UFQ return to Cropredy's lineup in 2025.

In March 2012, the band released their third album, Off Beaten Tracks, recorded in the summer of 2011 between dates in Spain, Germany, Canada, Italy and The UK.

May 2013 saw the recording of two appearances, in London and Birmingham, towards UFQ Live II, their second live album, released 8 November 2013 at Kings Place in London.

Frank Moon departed the band following their autumn 2013 tour, replaced by Dan Walsh (banjo player) on banjo, guitar and vocals.

The band released studio album The Escape on 1 May 2015. The album was listed on Martin Chilton's "Best of Folk 2015" list compiled for The Telegraph, as well as appearing on Folk Radio UK's Best of 2015 and Shire Folk's top ten of 2015, where they took the number two spot. The UFQ played tracks from the album live in session on Mark Radcliffe's BBC Radio 2 Folk Show on 24 June 2015, which led to their track The Breakthrough/Barnstorming being included on compilation album The Mark Radcliffe Folk Sessions 2015. "The Escape Tour" saw the band play dates across England as well as appearances in Wales, France, Belgium and Denmark throughout 2015 and continued into 2016 with 16 spring dates across the UK.

Following Trigás and Broughton's contributions to her 2015 single The Answer, the band were invited to play a support set for Joss Stone at the Roundhouse in Camden, London on 15 May 2016. Curated by Stone, her only 2016 UK appearance, "Joss Stone And Friends", saw the singer take the stage with guests Lemar, Nitin Sawhney, Jocelyn Brown, Dennis Bovell, Linton Kwesi Johnson and Linda Lewis, for a charity event, streamed live around the world, in celebration of UK children's charity Barnardo's 150th anniversary.

The Urban Folk Quartet Live III was released on 21 October 2016. Taken from recordings of concerts in Stafford, Bristol, Maldon and Chester during "The Escape Tour" the album is the band's first live release to feature Dan Walsh and continued their pattern of alternating studio albums with live albums and saw appearances across the UK and Europe.

In 2019, UFQ celebrated their tenth anniversary with an extended eight-piece lineup that toured festivals, including Joe's younger brother Sal Broughton on electric bass, and Paloma's younger sister Aria Trigás on violin.

UFQ's pattern of extensive UK touring in Spring and Autumn, alongside UK and European festivals in the summer continued until the COVID-19 pandemic of 2020, which brought about UFQ's longest period of inactivity in their history.

In 2022, UFQ returned to live work with a sold out appearance at Théâtre de Coutances in Normandy.

2024 saw the release of 'True Story', the band's fourth full-length studio album. Following on from his role in the UFQ Extended Lineup of 2019, Sal Broughton recorded some bass parts for the album shortly before his death in 2022 at the age of 30. After this tragic turn of events, the completion of True Story later became a project involving more guests than any previous UFQ album. Contributions included Dave Pegg of Fairport Convention on bass, Rosie Rutherford on bass clarinet, Joe's older brother Ben Broughton on slide guitar, and mother daughter duo Chris While and Kellie While on vocals. Joe and Paloma's daughter Sabela provided additional fiddle on the band's cover of Peter Gabriel's Solsbury Hill.

In celebration of their fifteenth birthday and the recent reacquisition of the rights to their debut album, UFQ released 'fifteen', a compilation drawn from their studio back catalogue in 2024. After a release hiatus, this made 2024 the first year in UFQ's history in which two albums were released. That said, 'fifteen' was not given an official release, press or radio coverage. It was at first exclusive to UFQ's 'UFQ VIP' website membership, before being released to fans via UFQ's mailing list, social media, and other means of deliberately direct distribution.

UFQ's 2024 15th Birthday Party at Worcester's Huntingdon Hall featured a number of special guests, including founding member Frank Moon, and was recorded and filmed for probable future release as a live album and/or movie. As well as an annual fixture for the band, the venue was the first place in which UFQ took to the stage for a production rehearsal/private gig in front of an invited audience in 2009.

== Discography ==
=== Studio albums ===
- The Urban Folk Quartet (2010)
- Off Beaten Tracks (2012)
- The Escape (2015)
- True Story (2024)

=== Live ===
- The Urban Folk Quartet: Live (2011)
- UFQ Live II (2013)
- The Urban Folk Quartet Live III (2016)

=== Compilation ===
Fifteen (2024) SAECD23, 469632

== Awards ==
- Winners, Spanish International Folk Competition 2009.
- Hancock award for best new act of 2010.
