= From Past Archives =

Live album by Fairport Convention
- Released: 1994
- Recorded: 1969 onwards
- Genre: Folk rock
- Label: Rough Trade

From Past Archives is a live compilation album by English folk rock band Fairport Convention originally issued in Italy in 1992 and reissued by Rough Trade in 1994. It includes several tracks from their BBC sessions in the late 1960s and early 1970s, as well as later tracks from the Cropredy Festival.

== Track listing ==
1. "Nottamun Town" (Trad. Arr. Fairport) – 3:37
  - BBC Top Gear, recorded May 28, 1968, in 201 Piccadilly, Studio 1, broadcast June 2, 1968.
2. "Meet On The Ledge" (Thompson) – 2:50
  - BBC Stuart Henry, recorded December 2, 1968, in Aeolian Hall, Studio 2, broadcast December 8, 1968.
3. "You're Going To Need My Help" (Morganfield) – 3:58
  - BBC Radio 1 Club, host Tony Blackburn, recorded January 6, 1969, broadcast January 20, 1969.
4. "Sir Patrick Spens" (Trad. Arr. Fairport) – 3:42
5. "Tam Lin" (Trad. Arr. Fairport) – 7:41
6. "Reynardine" (Trad. Arr. Fairport) – 4:09
  - BBC Top Gear, recorded September 23, 1969, in Maida Vale, Studio 4, broadcast September 27, 1969.
7. "Open The Door Richard" (Dylan) – 3:08
  - BBC Sound of the Seventies, host David Symonds, recorded April 21, 1970, broadcast April 27, 1970.
8. "Sloth" (Thompson, Swarbrick) – 11:58
  - Live at the Filmore West, August 31, 1970.
9. "Sickness and Diseases" (Thompson, Swarbrick) – 4:39
  - BBC Sound of the Seventies, host Stuart Henry, recorded November 12, 1970, broadcast November 19, 1970.
10. "She Moves Through The Fair" (Trad. Arr. Fairport) – 3:16
11. "Like An Old Fashioned Waltz" (Denny) – 3:55
  - Live at the Troubadour, Los Angeles, February 1974.
12. "Rising For The Moon" (Denny) – 4:24
13. "Down In The Flood" (Dylan) – 3:25
  - BBC John Peel Show, recorded July 16, 1974, Langham, Studio 1, broadcast August 6, 1974.
14. "No More Sad Refrains" (Denny) – 3:34
  - Live at the Royal Albert Hall, London, June 10, 1975.
15. "John The Gun" (Denny) – 4:58
16. "Doctor of Physick" (Thompson, Swarbrick) – 4:02
  - Live at The Cropredy Festival, Oxfordshire, England, August 11, 1984.
