= Julie Matthews =

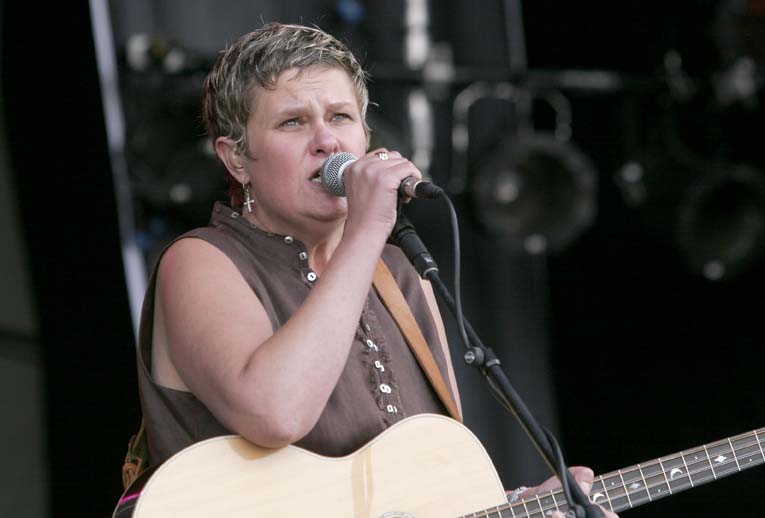
- Julie Matthews at the 2005 Cropredy Festival

Background information
- Born: 1963 (age 62–63); Sheffield, Yorkshire, England
- Genres: Folk music, country music, Americana
- Occupations: Singer-songwriter, instrumentalist and record producer
- Instruments: Vocals, Piano, Guitar, Bazouki, Gazouki, Mandolin, Piano Accordion, Harmonica and Percussion
- Years active: 1981–present
- Labels: Fat Cat Records (1992-3 and 1997–present) and HTD Records (1993–96)
- Website: whileandmatthews.co.uk

Julie Matthews (born 1963) is an English singer-songwriter, multi-instrumentalist, and record producer. She has been a member of British folk duos and groups, and her work has been covered by a range of artists and groups. Her music is often classified as English folk, but it contains strong American influences.

== Early career ==
Julie Matthews was born in Sheffield, Yorkshire, England. The daughter of a steel worker, she began playing guitar at the age of nine before teaching herself the piano. While still in school, she began songwriting and recording, which led her to soon explore what she would later identify as the three primary aspects of her songwriting: "Confession, observation and social comment." She left school at 18 and began writing songs for a small London publishing company. After a few months the company went bankrupt, and she worked for several years as a nightclub and hotel pianist throughout Europe while also performing her own music at festivals.

== With Pat Shaw ==
Matthews met Pat Shaw at a session at a local radio station and they formed a musical partnership, singing and playing together. However, while singing at the Feet First Festival in Derbyshire in 1990 Matthews was seen by Ashley Hutchings, who invited her to join the Albion Band. With a lack of progress of their own projects Shaw began a career in teaching and Julie joined the Albion Band and toured with them for three years. No studio album was created with this line-up, but recordings from this period surfaced as Captured (1995).

Matthews and Shaw released their first album, As Long As I Am Able, in 1992. Matthews left the Albion Band in 1993 and was replaced by songwriter, guitarist and singer Chris While. Matthews and Shaw joined fellow south Yorkshire musicians Kathleen and Rosalie Deighton, Kate Rusby, and Kathryn Roberts for the album Intuition (1993). The same year they released their debut album Lies and Alibis. All the compositions were by Matthews, including "Thorn Upon a Rose", which was subsequently covered as a single by Mary Black and which charted in Ireland and Japan, helping to establish Matthews's reputation as a songwriter. The album received critical acclaim, being nominated in the 'rising star' category of the Great British Country Music Awards; this led to the duo opening for Mary Chapin Carpenter at Her Majesty's Theatre in London in 1994. However, soon after Shaw returned to her career in teaching and Matthews rejoined the Albion Band.

== The Albion Band ==
Matthews and Chris While now became the mainstay of writing within the band. The 1995 release Albion Heart included the While/Matthews collaborations of "Man in the Bottle" (with Ashley Hutchings) and the title track. In addition Matthews contributed three tracks, including the up tempo "Devil in Me" and the ballad "Love is an Abandoned Car". In 1995 While and Matthews toured Canada as 'The Women of Albion'. The intention was a one-off project, but positive audience reception and their growing musical partnership led them towards pursuing joint projects. They released an EP, Blue Moon on the Rise (1995), with five jointly written tracks, including the since much recorded reworking of a traditional theme as 'Young Man Cut Down in His Prime'.

Matthews's solo debut, Such Is Life (1996), was notable for the fact that six of the fourteen tracks had already been recorded. One had been used by Fairport Convention as the title track of their 1995 album Jewel in the Crown, (the anti-imperial message of which led to accusations of being unpatriotic) and "Love me or Not" was covered by Frances Black. In 1996 Matthews and While joined with Christine Collister, Melanie Harrold and Helen Watson to form Daphne's Flight. They produced an eponymous record that showcased the vocal talent of the group. The last Albion album with While and Matthews, Demi Paradise, was released in 1996. Matthews contributed to five of the twelve tracks, but by this point she and While had decided to focus on their solo and joint work and left the band after the 1997 Cropredy Festival in August.

== While and Matthews ==
=== In the Big Room to Stages ===
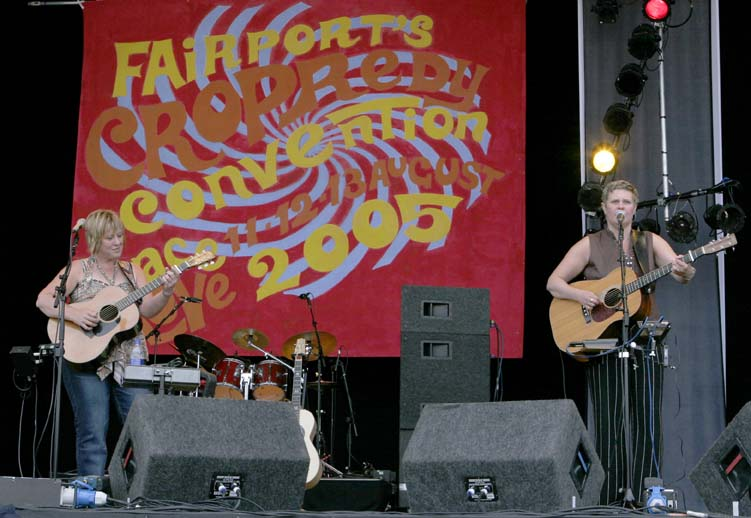
Chris While and Julie Matthews at the 2005 Cropredy Festival

Matthews co-produced While's solo album, In the Big Room, with writing credits for two songs and instrumental contributions on every track. This was followed by their first album as a duo, Piecework, in 1998. It included the Matthews-written "Class Reunion" which became a concert favourite; the collaboration "Even the Desert", and "Seven Years of Rust", which was based on her father's experiences. Their second album, Higher Potential, was released in October 1999. Tracks written by Matthews included "Angels Walk Among Us" and "Digging Holes". The following year there was the double live album, Stages.

=== Quest to Perfect Mistake ===
Their third joint studio album, Quest (2001), was produced by Ghanaian musician Kwame Yeboah of e2K and featured his multi-instrumental skills. It was hailed as their best album to date, and as cementing their position 'as two of Britain's most important singer/songwriters'. In this period While and Matthews began to tour frequently in the UK, Europe, Africa, North America and Australia. They are particularly well regarded in the last of these, where they fill large concert halls and attend the major festivals. For the 2004 release Perfect Mistake nine of the twelve tracks were written by Matthews and two co-written with While.

=== Here and Now to Shoulder To Shoulder ===
In 2005, they released Here and Now, recorded at the Worden Arts Centre in Leyland, Lancashire, with a more acoustic and stripped-down sound. The live vibe may explain its positive reception in the music press, especially among more traditional folk commentators. In the same year Matthews released her second solo album Slow, which showcased some of her down tempo songwriting and which received positive, if not effusive, reviews. Stage 2: Live at the Firehouse (2007) was a second live album. In 2008 While and Matthews released their sixth studio album Together Alone; Propaganda magazine described the duo as 'dealing so very tenderly with simple universal truths, they achieve their impact by an astute economy of expression allied to warmly accessible melodies and arrangements'.

In 2006, they released their first 'Best Of' album which covered their career up to Here & Now. 2010 saw the release of Hitting The Ground Running then in 2012 came Infinite Sky. Who We Are was released in 2014 and the single "If This Were Your Last Day" from that album was on the BBC Radio 2 playlist for three weeks. They appeared on Weekend Wogan live and were played on daytime radio. Their 10th album in 22 years Shoulder to Shoulder was released in September 2016.

== Diverse projects ==
=== St Agnes Fountain ===
In December 2001, While and Matthews joined with Chris Leslie and David Hughes to form the Christmas project St Agnes Fountain, which combined original music, unique arrangements of classic seasonal songs, with a good deal of humour. They have toured in the pre-Christmas season every year since, released 'Acoustic Carols for Christmas' in 2001 and have produced five subsequent albums: Comfort and Joy (2002), The Show (2003), Three Ships (2003) The White Xmas Album (2006) and Soul Cake (2008).

=== Blue Tapestry ===
In 2002 the duo collaborated with instrumentalists Maartin Allcock, Pete Zorn and Neil Marshall for a series of live performances under the title 'Blue Tapestry', which cumulated in a performance at the 2003 Fairport's Cropredy Festival. This was a show featuring the music of Carole King and Joni Mitchell, which resulted in a subsequent release of Blue Tapestry Live (2003).

=== Radio work ===
As a duo While and Matthews have worked on several musical projects for the BBC including Tales of the Towpath (2005), a radio documentary about the building of the Manchester Ship Canal and the 2006 Radio Ballads. Matthews wrote 11 of the songs, covering four of the programmes for the shows. In 2007, she embarked on a solo tour that included these songs, interspersing the live performances with recordings of the original narratives the songs were written around.

=== Party on the Lawn ===
While and Matthews hold an annual festival, 'Party on the Lawn', which takes place at Prebendal Farm, Bishopstone, Wiltshire in June.

=== Rejoice the Voice ===
While and Matthews, with fellow Daphne's Flight member Helen Watson, tour with a women's vocal workshop, 'Rejoice the Voice', providing women with an opportunity to sing collectively and improve their vocal technique. In 2009 Matthews, While and Watson released Bare Bones, including some of the songs they worked on at the 'Rejoice the Voice' workshops.

=== Record production ===
Matthews has produced albums for other artists, including Helen Watson's Somersault (1998) and Lifesize (2002) and Kellie While's Tenacious (2001).

== Awards ==
While and Matthews have been nominated as best duo in the BBC Radio 2 Folk awards seven times and as best live act twice and won the 'Best Duo' award in 2009.

== Discography ==
=== Solo albums ===
- Such is Life (1996)
- Slow (2006)

=== With Chris While and Helen Watson ===
- Bare Bones (2009)

=== With Pat Shaw ===
- As Long as I am Able (1992)
- Lies and Alibis (1993)

=== With Kathleen Deighton, Rosalie Deighton, Kathryn Roberts, Kate Rusby, and Pat Shaw ===
- Intuition (1993)

=== With the Albion Band ===
- Captured (1995)
- Albion Heart (1995)
- Demi Paradise (1996)
- The Acoustic Years 1993–97 (1997)
- Albion Heart on Tour (2004)

=== With Chris While ===
- Blue Moon on the Rise EP (1995)
- Piecework (1998)
- Higher Potential (1999)
- Stages (2000)
- Quest (2001)
- Perfect Mistake (2004)
- Here and Now (2005)
- The Best of While and Matthews (2006)
- Stage 2: Live at the Firehouse (2007)
- Together Alone (2008)
- Hitting The Ground Running
- Infinite Sky (2012)
- Who We Are (2014)
- Shoulder To Shoulder (2016)

=== With Daphne's Flight ===
- Daphne's Flight (1996)

=== With St Agnes Fountain ===
- Acoustic Carols for Christmas (2001)
- Comfort and Joy (2002)
- The Show (2003)
- Three Ships (2003)
- The White Xmas Album (2006)
- Soul Cake (2008)
- Spirit of Christmas (2010)
- Best of St Agnes Fountain (Double CD) (2011)
- Twelve Years of Christmas (2012)
- Christmas is not Far Away (2014)
- The Best of St Agnes Fountain Vol.2 (2015)

=== With Blue Tapestry ===
- Blue Tapestry Live (2003)
