= Acousticity =

Acousticity may refer to:

- Acousticity (The Albion Band album), 1993
- Acousticity (David Grisman album), 1984
