= Deborah Bonham =

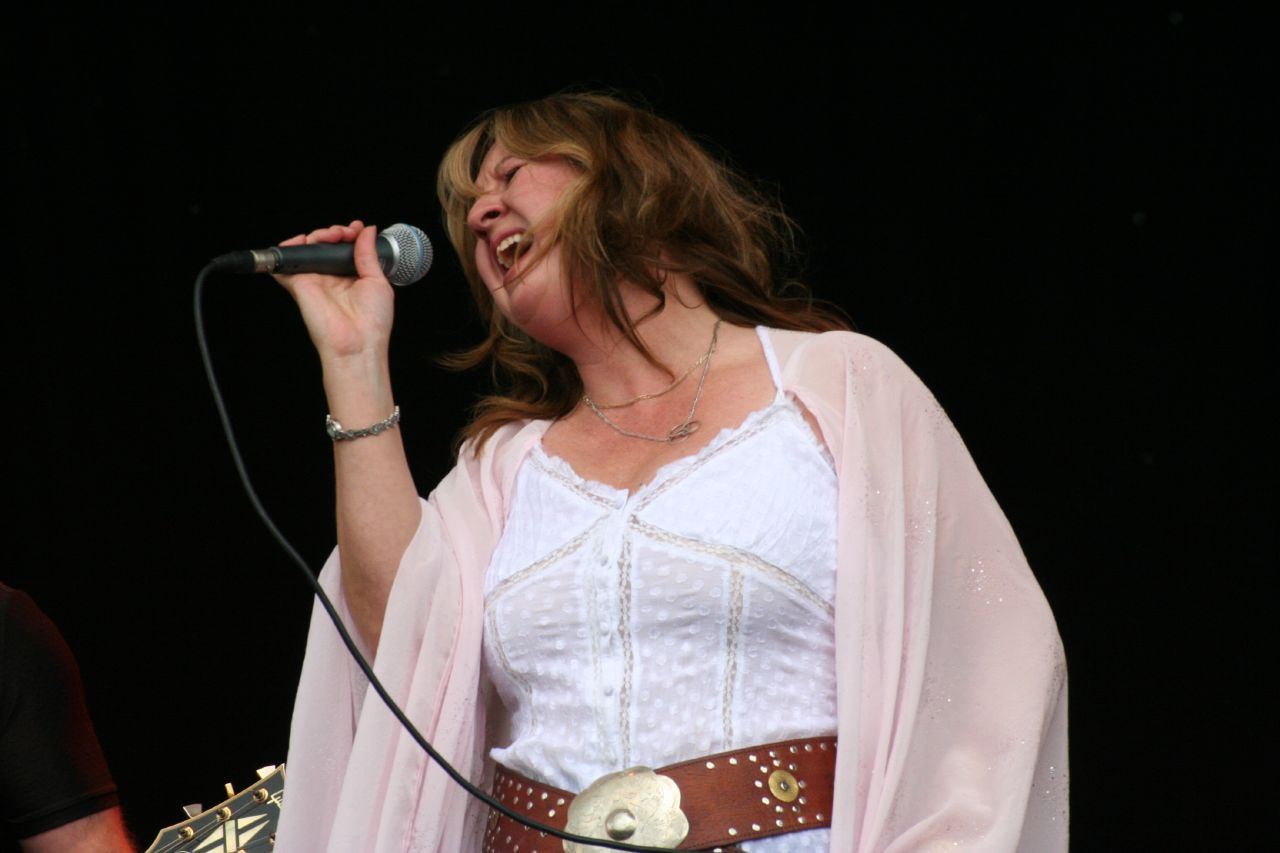
- Bonham at Fairport's Cropredy Convention 2006

Background information
- Born: Deborah Bonham; 7 February 1962 (age 64); Redditch, Worcestershire, England
- Genres: Rock; blues; blues rock
- Occupations: Singer, musician, songwriter
- Instruments: Vocals; tambourine; cowbell
- Years active: 1985–present
- Labels: Carrere; Track; Rhino
- Website: deborahbonham.com

Deborah Bonham (born 7 February 1962) is an English rock and blues singer and the younger sister of John Bonham, the late drummer for the band Led Zeppelin. Born in Redditch, Worcestershire, she lived with her father in The Old Hyde farm, Cutnall Green (the location where John Bonham's fantasy sequence was filmed for The Song Remains the Same). While living there, she started playing and recording music with her nephew Jason Bonham who has played drums on her two most recent studio releases.

== Life and career ==
When Led Zeppelin was formed in 1968, Deborah was six years old. While living on the family's Old Hyde estate, Deborah and her brother John's son, nephew Jason started playing and recording their own songs. At the age of 17, at Robert Plant's house in a nearby village, she recorded her first demos. With some encouragement and advice from mentor Plant, Bonham sent out the songs anonymously and soon landed her first record deal with the major European label Carerre Records in 1985, for whom she recorded the critically acclaimed album For You and the Moon. The album reached the top 5 in the NME chart, was DJ Simon Bates record of the week on BBC Radio 1 and sold well in Europe, being voted "Record of the Year" by Musikmarkt in Germany.

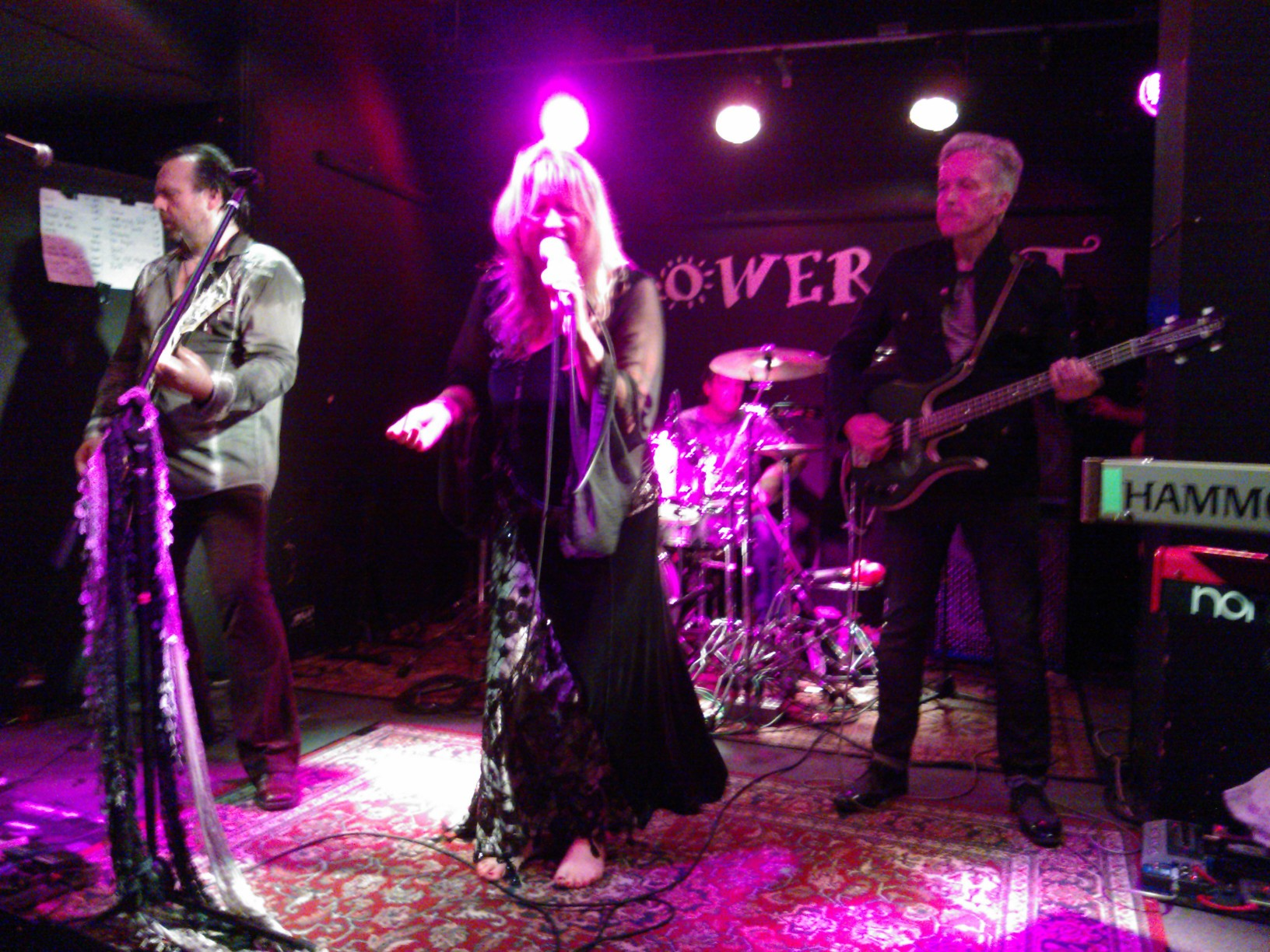
Deborah Bonham performing with her band in 2013

A period of recording for the Japanese Sam Corporation followed, with press and radio promotion including interviews for music publication Burrn! and J-Wave FM Radio. After this, English label RPM records released the CD single, "Perfect World" in 1995. Bonham spent 1996 organising a new band, together with new songs for an album and playing a series of shows such as headlining the Belfast Festival and a sell out show at the Bottom Line, in Shepherd's Bush. The beginning of 1997 saw the first of many trips to the United States. She performed live on Los Angeles's Rockline syndicated radio show to three million listeners throughout North America. This was followed by a special appearance with Jason Bonham and his band at the Whisky a Go Go in Los Angeles. Her band also opened for Jason Bonham Band's shows in Los Angeles House of Blues with guests Slash and Terry Reid, and subsequent other House of Blues appearances. Bonham also played at festivals including Glastonbury and Fairport's Cropredy Convention.

In 2004, she recorded her second album on the Track label and toured in support of it. Neither of these first two albums were released in the United States. In June 2008, her third album Duchess was issued on ATCO by Rhino Records and released in the United States.

Bonham has also toured and performed with Van Halen, Alannah Myles, Tim Rose, Uli Jon Roth, Humble Pie, Donovan, Lonnie Donegan, Jools Holland, Foreigner, and Paul Rodgers.

== Discography ==
- For You and the Moon

Side One

1. "Sanctuary"
2. "It's Only Love"
3. "On The Air Tonight"
4. "Who Is The Enemy"
5. "Hungry Night"

Side Two

1. "For You and the Moon"
2. "Fly Away"
3. "Lovers And Friends"
4. "Never Looking Back"

Region	Date	Label	Format	Catalog
United Kingdom	1985	Carrere	stereo LP	CAL216

- The Old Hyde
1. "Shit Happens" (Deborah Bonham) – 4:43
2. "Stay With Me Baby" (Jerry Ragovoy / Donna Weiss) – 3:48
3. "Anything" (Deborah Bonham) – 4:10
4. "Go Now" (Deborah Bonham) – 4:25
5. "Need Your Love So Bad" (Little Willie John, Mertis John Jr.) – 6:01
6. "Black Coffee" (Ike Turner) – 4:22
7. "Devil's in New Orleans" (Deborah Bonham) – 3:48
8. "What We've Got" (Deborah Bonham / Peter Bullick) – 3:51
9. "Open Your Heart" (Deborah Bonham / M. Fredriksen) – 4:32
10. "No Angel" (Deborah Bonham) – 4:39
11. "Without You" (Deborah Bonham) – 3:48
12. "Religion" (Deborah Bonham) – 4:53
13. "Ten Steps Back" (Deborah Bonham / Peter Bullick / G. Morris) – 4:38
14. "The Old Hyde" (Deborah Bonham) – 5:52

Region	Date	Label	Format	Catalog
United Kingdom	14 September 2004	Track (Navarre)	stereo CD	99

- Duchess
1. "Grace" – 3:56
2. "Jack Past 8" (Deborah Bonham / Peter Bullick / Gerard Louis / Ian Rowley / Jerry Shirley) – 3:03
3. "Hole in My Heart" (Deborah Bonham / Peter Bullick / Gerard Louis / Ian Rowley / Jerry Shirley / Steve Marriott) – 2:38
4. "Hold On" – 4:15
  - A duet featuring Paul Rodgers of Bad Company.
5. "Love Lies" – 3:23
6. "Pretty Thing" – 3:09
7. "Love You So" – 3:56
8. "How Do You Feel" (Deborah Bonham) – 4:41
9. "Chains" (Sutherland) – 3:12
10. "Duchess and the Shufflemeister" – 4:53
11. "Waiting So Long" – 4:14
12. "(If You) Had a Little Love" – 3:37
13. "Blue" (Deborah Bonham) – 2:15
  - All songs composed by Deborah Bonham, Peter Bullick, Gerard Louis & Ian Rowley unless otherwise noted.

Region	Date	Label	Format	Catalog
United States	24 June 2008	Rhino (ATCO)	stereo CD	452476
