= Dan Walsh (banjo player) =

British banjoist and guitarist

Dan Walsh is a British banjoist and guitarist. He is known for the wide variety of banjo techniques he includes in his performances, and for his particular skill at clawhammer style banjo.

Walsh has performed as a duo with harmonica player Will Pound. He also played on the folk musician Sunjay's self-titled album in 2014. In 2014 he joined The Urban Folk Quartet. The group's album The Escape, was included in the Telegraph's list of Best Albums of 2015.

== Discography ==
- Tomorrow's Still to Come, 2009
- Come What May, 2013, with Clutching at Straws
- Sunjay, 2014, with Sunjay
- Incidents and Accidents, 2015
- The Escape, 2015, with Urban Folk Quartet
- Live III, 2016, with Urban Folk Quartet
- Verging on the Perpendicular, 2017
- Right At Home Live At Mount Hooley, 2017, with Alistair Anderson
