= Chris While =

English singer-songwriter

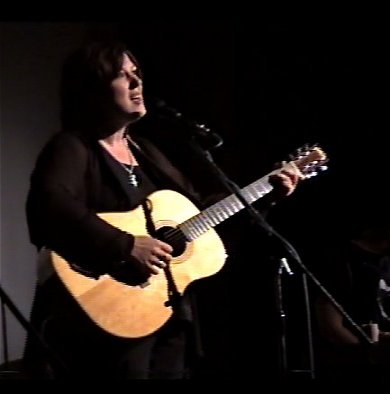
- Chris While on stage in Hobart, Australia, April 1997

Background information
- Born: Christine Mills; 1956 (age 69–70)
- Origin: Barrow-in-Furness, Lancashire, England
- Genres: Folk music, country music, Americana
- Occupation: Singer-songwriter
- Instruments: Vocals, Acoustic guitar, Banjo, Dulcimer and Percussion
- Years active: 1974–present
- Labels: Water on the Wall Music (1993), HTD Records (1993–96) Fat Cat Records (1997–present)
- Website: www.whileandmatthews.com

Chris While (born 1956) is an English songwriter, singer and musician, known particularly for her vocals and live performances. She has worked as a solo artist, a songwriter and as a member of a number of duos and groups. Her music is often classified as English folk, but contains strong American influences.

== Early career ==
She was born and grew up in Barrow-in-Furness, Lancashire, where her childhood, work and relationships provided a basis to many of her songs. She began to learn to play the guitar at the age of thirteen and was soon performing and singing at local folk clubs. She left Barrow to tour in a duo with her then husband, pianist and songwriter Joe While. After their divorce in 1991 she embarked on a solo career, releasing the albums Still on Fire (1991) and By Request (1992) in tape format. The albums demonstrated English and American folk and country music influences that have all remained important in her career. The tracks included some traditional material and covers of songs by some major songwriters, but also marked her emergence as a songwriter, in particular the track "100 Miles", which has been frequently covered by British and American artists. Singer/songwriter Ruud Hermans from The Netherlands recorded a version of the song on his album "Little Tear, Big Smile" in 1998. This song was also on Chris While's first CD format album Look at Me Now (1993) with others written with Nigel Stonier and her former husband, but many of the tracks were single compositions indicating a growing confidence in her own songwriting. From 1992–95 she also performed with accomplished guitarist and songwriter Ken Nicol who contributed to the high level of musicianship on Look at Me Now. Their 1994 recording was eventually released as Shadows on the Wall (1995), which included three While-penned tracks from her early solo material.

== The Albion Band ==
In 1993 she joined the Albion Band as lead singer and guitarist, replacing Julie Matthews. She toured and recorded with the band for four years gaining a much wider audience and reputation, both nationally and internationally, honing her stage technique and contributing individually or collectively to most of the songs on three group albums. The first, Acousticity (1993), included five of her collaborations as writer or arranger with other members of the group. In 1994 Julie Matthews rejoined the band and the 1995 release Albion Heart included two tracks penned by Chris, as well as the While/Matthews collaborations of 'Man in the Bottle' (with Ashley Hutchings) and together on the title track, which became something of a group anthem and was the first evidence of a fruitful musical collaboration. During this time she co-wrote (along with Ashley Hutchings and Phil Beer) over forty new English folk songs for the TV series The Ridge Riders, which resulted in the release of a sixteen-track CD Ridgeriders (1999), seven of which were jointly written by Chris.

In 1995 Chris and Julie toured Canada as The Women of Albion. The intention was a one-off project, however, audience reception and their growing musical partnership led them towards pursuing joint projects. They released an EP Blue Moon on the Rise with five jointly penned tracks, including the since much recorded reworking of a traditional theme as 'Young Man Cut Down in His Prime'. In 1996 they joined with Christine Collister, Melanie Harrold and Helen Watson to form Daphne's Flight. They produced an eponymous record that showcased the formidable vocal talent in the group and included another song by Chris that would become an audience favourite "Circle Round the Sun". The last Albion album with Chris and Julie, Demi Paradise, was released in 1996. With more polished production than was often the Albion style, most of Chris's contributions had already been showcased elsewhere and the band was perhaps no longer the primary focus for either performer. Their last gig with the band was the 1997 Cropredy Festival in August.

== While and Matthews ==
=== In the Big Room to Stages ===
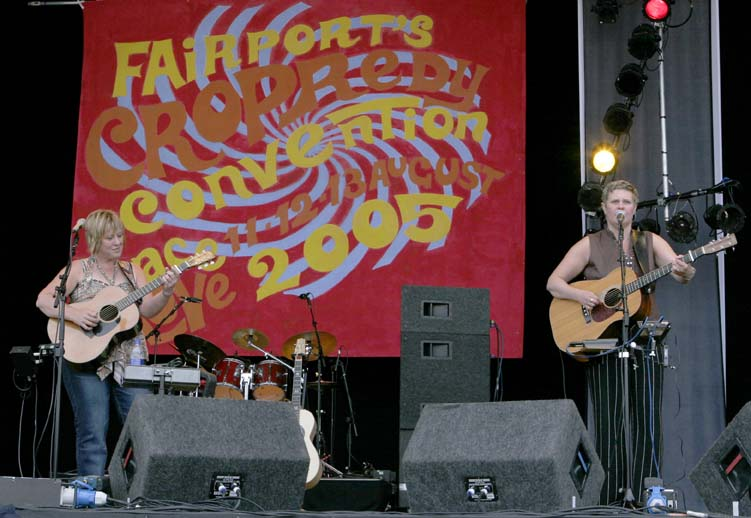
Chris While and Julie Matthews at the 2005 Cropredy Festival

In 1997 Chris and Julie left the Albion Band to pursue their individual and joint projects and Chris released her fourth solo album, 'In the Big Room'. As well as containing some notable covers, it included one track, 'Sister Moon', from early in Chris's career, but was dominated by Chris' new songwriting.

This was followed by what was formally Chris and Julie's first album as a duo, 'Piecework', in 1998. This included what are often considered some of Chris and Julie's most powerful songs and marking the emergence of their distinctive and highly polished sound. Chris contributed her vocal and instrumental skills to Julie's songs as well as penning the powerful title track, which recalls her time in factory work in Barrow. A busy recording schedule resulted in their second album 'Higher Potential' in October 1999, which showcased their diverse influences, from Chris's bluesy 'Tire Tracks in the Snow' to the poignant 'Love has Gone to War'. It also included Chris's ' The Light in My Mothers Eye", dedicated to her own mother, which was nominated for best song in the first BBC Radio 2's prestigious Folk Music Awards. The following year there was the much anticipated double live album, Stages, which managed to capture some of the duo's outstanding live sound and stagecraft, as well as many of their best songs to date.

=== Quest to Stage 2 ===
Their third joint studio album, Quest (2001), was produced by acclaimed Ghanaian musician Kwame Yeboah of e2K / Craig David and featured his multi-instrumental skills. It was hailed as their best album to date, and as cementing their position "as two of Britain's most important singer/songwriters". It included ‘Shadow of my former self’ featuring a consummate While vocal performance and the live favourite ‘Bruccianni’s Café’. In this period Chris and Julie began to tour frequently in the UK, Europe, Africa, North America and Australia. They are particularly well regarded in the last of these, where they fill large concert halls and attend the major festivals. The 2004 release Perfect Mistake contained fewer of her writing contributions, but some of her most stunning vocals. In 2005 they released Here and Now, recorded at the Worden Arts Centre in Leyland Lancashire, with a more acoustic and stripped-down sound. The live vibe may explain its very positive reception in the music press, especially among more traditional folk commentators. The retrospective The Best of While and Matthews (2006) and Stage 2: Live at the Firehouse (2007), a second live album containing some fan favourites and songs written since 2000, summarised their partnership to that point.

=== Rosella Red to Shoulder to Shoulder ===
Chris’s first solo album for ten years, Rosella Red, was released in 2007, with her song writing, instrumental playing and vocals enhanced by strong arrangements and playing by Joe Broughton. Her own songs covered the now familiar subjects of family, youth and relationships, but there were also some stunning covers including the haunting ‘Pennyweight Hill’ written by her late friend, Austrian singer/songwriter Michael Kennedy and revisited Chris’s musical roots with a fine version of Joni Mitchell's "Both Sides Now". The album received perhaps the greatest critical acclaim to date, receiving five stars from Maverick magazine, which described 'a quite superb album from one of the most notable women, currently living up to the reputation she has quite painstakingly built over a number of years in the contemporary folk scene.' In 2008 Chris and Julie released their sixth studio album Together Alone to further critical acclaim, with Propaganda magazine describing the duo as ‘dealing so very tenderly with simple universal truths, they achieve their impact by an astute economy of expression allied to warmly accessible melodies and arrangements’. In 2006 they released their first 'Best Of' album which covered their duo career up to Here & Now. 2010 saw the release of Hitting The Ground Running then in 2012 came Infinite Sky. Who We Are was released in 2014 and the single ("If This Were Your Last Day") from that album was on the BBC Radio 2 playlist for three weeks. They appeared on Weekend Wogan live and were played on daytime radio.

Their tenth album in 22 years Shoulder to Shoulder was released in September 2016.

== Diverse projects ==
While pursuing a career based around her work with Julie and her solo endeavours, Chris has been able to fit a number of diverse projects into a busy schedule of touring and recording.

St Agnes Fountain

In December 2001 Chris and Julie joined forces with Chris Leslie and David Hughes to form the Christmas project St Agnes Fountain, which combined original music, unique arrangements of classic seasonal songs, with a good deal of humour. They have toured in the pre-Christmas season every year since and released Acoustic Carols for Christmas in 2001 to critical acclaim and have produced five subsequent albums: 'Comfort and Joy' (2002), 'The Show' (2003), Three Ships (2003), The White Xmas Album (2006), Soul Cake (2008) 'The Spirit of Christmas' (2010)'The Best Of St Agnes Fountain' 2011 '12 Years Of Christmas' 2012 'Christmas is not Far Away' 2014 and 'The Best Of St Agnes Fountain (2) in 2015 .

Blue Tapestry

In 2002 the duo collaborated with outstanding instrumentalists Maartin Allcock, the late Pete Zorn, and Neil Marshall for a series of live performances under the title 'Blue Tapestry', which cumulated in a rapturous reception by 20,000 fans at the Cropredy Festival that year. The show featured the music of Carole King and Joni Mitchell and resulted in a subsequent release of the highly regarded album Blue Tapestry Live (2003), on which Chris was described as having a 'fluid, fabulous voice just eats up those complex vocal pyrotechnics with pure joy and ease.'

Chris and Kellie While

Chris's eventual replacement in the Albion Band was her daughter Kellie, also a talented singer and guitarist. From the age of thirteen Kellie had accompanied her mother to folk clubs to sing. They revisited this era with an album entitled Chris and Kellie While in 2004, notable for its strong harmonies and emotional delivery of standards and some of Chris's best songs. Since then they have toured together frequently, producing a second album, Too Few Songs, in 2006, which showcased some of the best songwriting available and a version of the previously unavailable While/Matthews track '36 Miles Away from the Sea'. The album received widespread critical acclaim: as the review in the Daily Telegraph put it 'each song remains a showcase for the delicate, complementary powers of expression of two expert vocalists, truly living up to the "more like sisters" description of one admirer, Ralph McTell'. Since then they have produced another album, Indigo (2015).

Radio work

As a duo, While and Matthews have worked on several musical projects for the BBC including Tales of the Towpath (2005), a radio documentary about the building of the Manchester Ship Canal, and the 2006 Radio Ballads.

Rejoice the Voice

Chris and Julie, along with fellow Daphne's Flight member Helen Watson, also tour with their woman's vocal workshop 'Rejoice the Voice', providing women with an opportunity to sing collectively and improve their vocal technique. In 2009 Julie, Chris and Helen released Bare Bones, featuring some of the songs they worked on at the 'Rejoice the Voice' workshops.

Liege and Lief Reunion

Over the years Chris has made many appearances with Fairport Convention including singing 'Matty Groves' at the BBC Radio 2 Folk Awards 2006, when they received the award for 'Most Influential Folk Album of All Time'. There may be no higher compliment in the English folk music community than when Chris was asked to take the place of the late Sandy Denny to re-create the classic Fairport album Liege & Lief with the original 1969 line-up at the 2007 Cropredy Festival in front of 20,000 fans, in a performance described as 'sublime'.

== Awards ==
Chris won the FAETA award for best female vocalist in 2007. Chris and Julie have been nominated as best duo in the BBC Radio 2 Folk awards seven times, as best live act twice, and won the 'Best Duo' award in 2009.

== Discography ==
=== Solo albums ===
- Still on Fire (1991)
- By Request (1992)
- Look at me Now (1993)
- In the Big Room (1997)
- Rosella Red (2007)
- Still on Fire/By Request re-release (2009)

=== With the Albion Band ===
- Acousticity (1993)
- Albion Heart (1995)
- Demi Paradise (1996)
- The Acoustic Years 1993–97 (1997)
- Albion Heart on Tour (2004)
- Acousticity on Tour (2004)

=== With Ken Nicol ===
- Shadows on the Wall (1995)

=== With Julie Matthews ===
- Blue Moon on the Rise EP (1995)
- Piecework (1998)
- Higher Potential (1999)
- Stages (2000)
- Quest (2001)
- Perfect Mistake (2004)
- Here and Now (2005)
- The Best of While and Matthews (2006)
- Stage 2: Live at the Firehouse (2007)
- Together Alone (2008)
- Hitting the Ground Running (2010)
- Infinite Sky (2012)
- Who We Are (2014)
- Shoulder To Shoulder (2016)
- Revolution Calls (2019)

=== With Julie Matthews and Helen Watson ===
- Bare Bones (2009)

=== With Daphne's Flight ===
- Daphne's Flight (1996)

=== With Phil Beer and Ashley Hutchings ===
- Ridgeriders (1999)
- Ridgeriders in Concert (2001)

=== With St Agnes Fountain ===
- Acoustic Carols for Christmas (2001)
- Comfort and Joy (2002)
- The Show (2003)
- Three Ships (2003)
- The White Xmas Album (2006)
- Soul Cake (2008)
- The Spirit of Christmas (2010)
- Best of St Agnes Fountain (Double CD) (2011)
- Twelve Years of Christmas (2012)
- Christmas is not far away (2014)
- The Best of St Agnes Fountain Vol.2 (2015)

=== With Blue Tapestry ===
- Blue Tapestry Live (2003)

=== With Kellie While ===
- Chris and Kellie While (2004)
- Too Few Songs (2011)
- Indigo (2015)

=== Compilations ===
- Rubber Folk (2006) with her cover of the song "Nowhere Man" by Lennon-McCartney
