= Albion Heart =

Studio album by Albion Band
- Released: 1995
- Recorded: Courtyard Recording Studio, Stockport, England, December 1994 and January 1995
- Genre: Folk
- Label: HTD (1995), Transatlantic (1999), Multimedia (2004)
- Producer: The Albion Band

Albion Band chronology
Acousticity (1993)	Albion Heart (1995)	Demi Paradise (1996)

Albion Heart, released in 1995, was the second album of the long running Albion Band's acoustic phase and the first to contain both Chris While and Julie Matthews, marking the beginning of their highly successful collaboration. It benefits from their song writing and instrumental talents, but is almost unique in the history of the band for its lack of traditional English instruments or tunes.

== History ==
After the departure of fiddle player Ashley Reed and the return of singer-songwriter Julie Matthews, the band toured extensively and began rehearsing material brought in by Matthews and new songs composed in various combinations and individually by band leader Ashley Hutchings, Matthews and While. This formed the basis of this recording at the Courtyard Recording Studio, Stockport, England. Live performances of this set were released as Albion Heart on Tour (Talking Elephant, 2004).

== Reception and Significance ==
The album had a mixed response in the folk and roots press of the time because of its lack of traditional material. Although Hutchings probably produced some of his best original compositions for this album, it was noted that it was dominated by the writing talents and harmonies of While and Matthews, which they were to build upon for their long musical partnership as a duo.

== Track listing ==
1. Albion Heart (4:51)
2. Appalachian Front-Porch Game (4:16)
3. Colours of Love (3:33)
4. Man in the Bottle (3:05)
5. The Devil in Me (4:08)
6. Rebecca Johnson (5:07)
7. Close Your Eyes (3:10) (Composed for the TV series Ridgeriders)
8. Crocodile Line (3:45)
9. Love Is an Abandoned Car (4:48)
10. Gypsy (4:54)
11. Get Up and Do It Again (3:42)
12. Long, Long Road (3:31)

== Credits ==
- Track 1 Julie Matthews, Chris While (Circuit Music)
- Tracks 2, 6, 8 Ashley Hutchings (Really Wicked)
- Tracks 3, 5, 9, 11 Julie Matthews (Circuit Music)
- Track 4 Ashley Hutchings, Julie Matthews, Chris While (Really Wicked / Circuit Music)
- Track 7 Ashley Hutchings, Chris While (Really Wicked / Circuit Music)
- Tracks 10, 12 Chris While (Circuit Music)

== Production ==
- Recorded at Courtyard Recording Studio, Stockport, England, December 1994 and January 1995.
- Engineered by Tim Woodward
- Produced by the Albion Band
- Photos by Brian Ledgard

== Personnel ==
- Ashley Hutchings, acoustic bass guitar, vocals;
- Julie Matthews, keyboards, acoustic guitar, vocals;
- Simon Nicol, acoustic guitar, mountain dulcimer, vocals;
- Chris While, acoustic guitar, vocal
