= Churchfitters =

English folk band

- Churchfitters at Bunkfest 2010

Background information
- Origin: Essex/Belfast, United Kingdom
- Genre: Folk
- Years active: 1978–present
- Members: Rosie Short, Boris Lebret, Chris Short, Margaux Scherer
- Past members: Anthony McCartan, Geoff Coombs, Chris Apps, Topher (Christopher) Loudon and others

The Churchfitters are an English folk group. They were founded in 1978 by singer/songwriter Anthony McCartan from Belfast and multi-instrumentist Geoff Coombs from Essex (later a founding member of the band Kip Keano), after a band they had previously both toured with collapsed.

Rosie Short joined soon after its formation having previously been playing in a London-based traditional Irish outfit. During the years that followed, the group frequently changed its line-up, as well as having many guest performers including reed maker Chris Apps. They group frequently toured East Anglia, before slimming down to a duo (McCartan and Short) in order to tour Europe and even Australia.

In 1993 the duo moved to Brittany, and was joined by Short's brother Chris (fiddle, mandolin, whistle and musical saw), who had been in London playing in World, Irish and Bluegrass groups.

In 1999, after 19 years of touring, they recorded their first studio album The Parting Glass in Vern-sur-Seiche. This was followed by Strange News in 2001 and the live album This Fine Night in 2003 taking tracks from their recent tour of France. From their base in Brittany they toured as a trio throughout France and Europe until McCartan's death from cancer on 4 September 2004. Shortly afterwards, Boris Lebret (double bass, homemade bass, six-string bass banjo, bing-bong-box and percussion) and Topher Loudon (vocals, bouzouki and guitar) joined the group. They have since produced four new albums: New Tales for Old (2005), Amazing (2007), Sing (2009) and Amongst the Green (2012).

Loudon left the band and Margaux Scherer (percussion, drums and backing vocals) joined Churchfitters for a new album Get Wise (2014).

== Discography ==
=== Albums ===
- The Parting Glass (1999)
- Strange News (2001)
- This Fine Night (2003)
- New Tales for Old (2005)
- Amazing (2007)
- Sing (2009)
- Amongst the Green (2012)
- Get Wise (2014)
