= Anthony John Clarke =

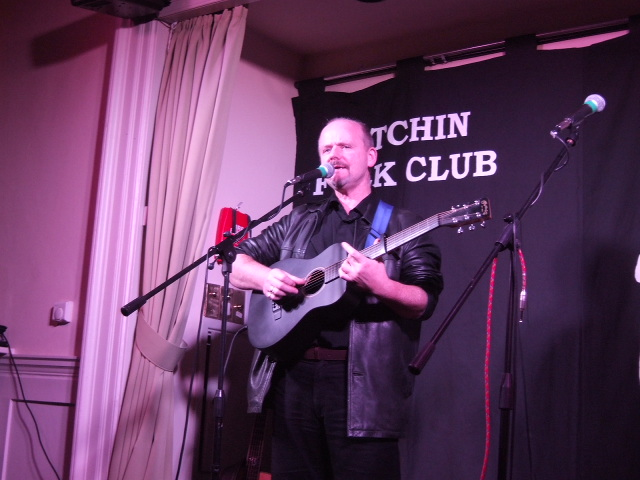
- Anthony John Clarke in 2009

Background information
- Origin: Belfast, Northern Ireland
- Occupation: Singer-songwriter
- Instruments: Vocals, guitar
- Years active: 1991–present
- Label: various
- Website: www.anthonyjohnclarke.com

Anthony John Clarke is a Northern Irish-born singer-songwriter for some time based in Liverpool but now living in Southport. Playing solo, duo or with a band, Clarke has played at folk clubs and festivals all over the UK and beyond, and he has a number of albums to his name including An Acquaintance Of Mine, Man with a Red Guitar and Sing A Chorus With Me (best of compilation album).

Amongst his best known songs are "The Broken Years" (about The Troubles), "The Only Life Gloria Knows" (about homelessness), and "Tuesday Night Is Always Karaoke". Many of his songs can be found in the book "The Songs of Anthony John Clarke".
