= Acousticity (The Albion Band album) =

Studio album by Albion Band
- Released: 1993
- Recorded: Astra Studios, Monks Horton, Ashford, Kent
- Genre: Folk
- Label: HTD (1993); Transatlantic Records (1999); Castle Music America (2002)
- Producer: Simon Nicol

Albion Band chronology
1990 (1990)	Acousticity (1993)	Albion Heart (1995)

Acousticity, released in 1993, was the first album in a new, stripped down format by the long-running folk rock outfit the Albion Band. It combines the song writing talents of the band members with traditional tunes and music from some of the best folk artists available at the time. It marked the beginning of a new lease of life for the long running and highly influential Albion Band, shaping the small group format that would be the basis of their line-up until their suspension in 2002.

== History ==
Band leader and folk legend Ashley Hutchings pre-empted the unplugged trend of the 1990s by reducing the numbers and instruments of his long running collective the Albion Band by bringing back longtime collaborator and fellow ex-Fairport Convention founder Simon Nicol, beside new talent: singer-songwriter and guitarist Chris While and energetic fiddler Ashley Reed. After touring in Britain and Canada with the new line-up, the band retired to the Astra Studios in Ashford, Kent to record some songs that were part of their live set and some newly rehearsed material. Live performances of this set were released as Acousticity on Tour (Talking Elephant, 2004).

== Reception and Significance ==
The album was well received in the folk and roots press of the time and has been singled out by Ashley Hutchings as one of the proudest achievements in his long career.

== Track listing ==
1. Flandyke Shore (3:35)
2. The Foresters / Nicol's Real Ale Polka / The Travellers / The Seven Stones (5:16)
3. Sister Moon (4:13)
4. We Lie (5:04)
5. Head-Smashed-In-Buffalo-Jump (3:46)
6. Head-Smashed-In Reel (1:45)
7. Black Jack, Blue John & Galena / Blue John Hornpipe (3:22)
8. Bitter-Sweet Bed (2:53)
9. Fastnet Rock / Man of War (6:02)
10. Carolan's Cap / Sir Festus Burke (3:02)
11. Dancer to the Drum (4:41)
12. Fiddle on the Washboard (6:10)

== Credits ==
- Track 1 Trad. arr. Nic Jones, Ashley Hutchings, Chris While
- Tracks 2a/c, 9a, 12 Ashley Reed
- Track 2b The Seven Stones
- Track 3 Chris While, Joe While
- Tracks 4, 5 Chris While, Ashley Hutchings
- Track 6 Ashley Reed, Simon Nicol, Chris While
- Track 7a Ashley Hutchings, Ashley Reed
- Track 7b Trad. arr. Ashley Reed, Chris While, Simon Nicol, Ashley Hutchings
- Track 8 Cyril Tawney
- Track 9b Steve Knightley
- Track 10 Turlough O'Carolan arr. Ashley Reed, Simon Nicol
- Track 11 Beth Nielsen Chapman

== Production ==
- Recorded at Astra Studios, Monks Horton, Ashford, Kent
- Engineered by Dave Woolgar & Paul Godfrey
- Produced by Simon Nicol
- Cover and sleeve design by Malcolm (Really Wicked Productions
- Cover photos by Clive Taylor
- Back photo by Mick Sherlock

== Personnel ==
- Ashley Hutchings, acoustic bass guitar, vocals;
- Simon Nicol, acoustic guitar, vocals;
- Ashley Reed, violin, vocals;
- Chris While, vocals, acoustic guitar;
- Diane Walmisley guests on vocals on Memories of You
