= Danny and the Champions of the World =

Heartland rock and soul band

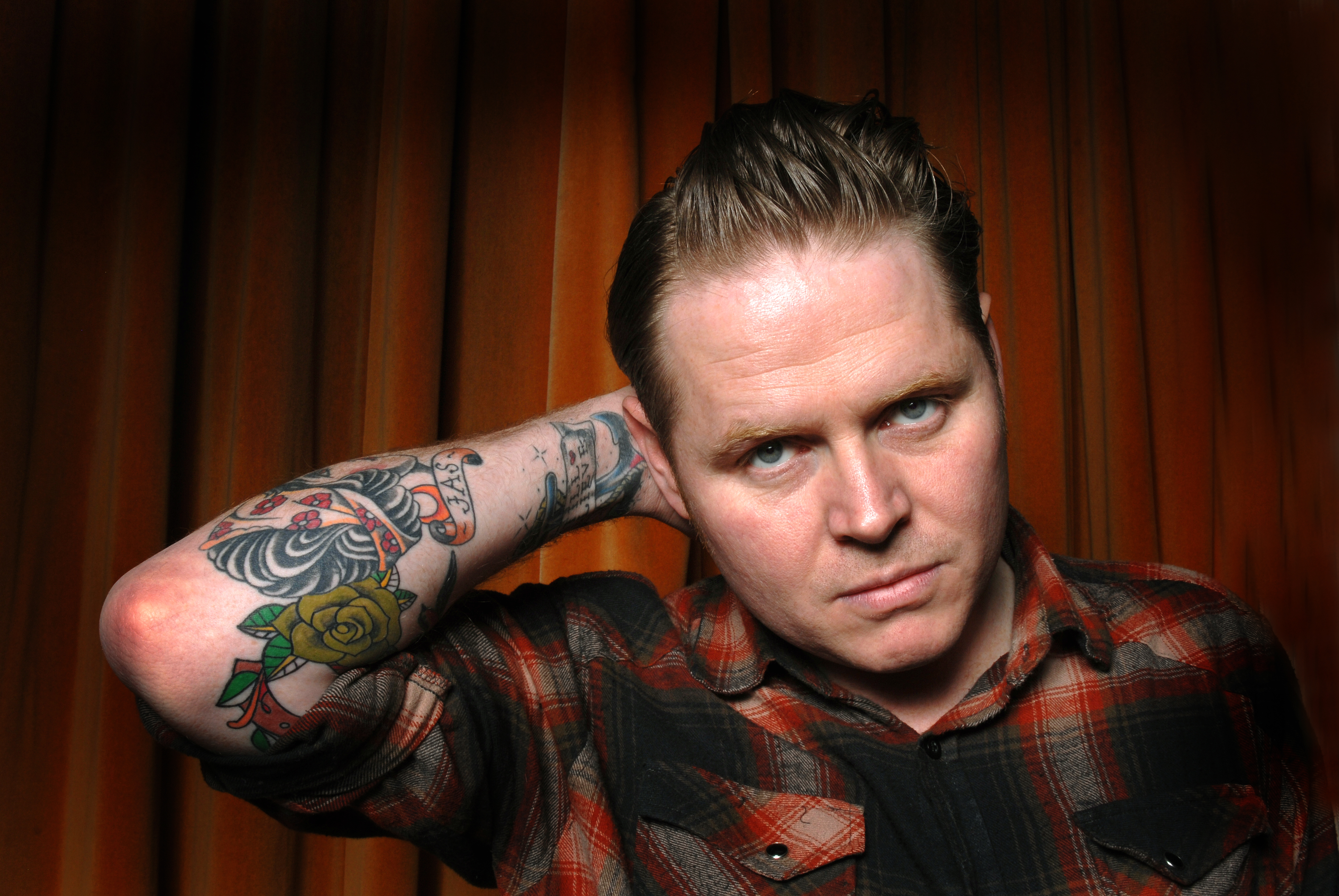

Background information
- Origin: London, England
- Genres: Heartland rock, folk rock, soul, alt country
- Years active: 2007-present
- Labels: Loose
- Members: Danny George Wilson (Vocals & Guitar); Paul Lush (Guitar); Joe Bennett (Bass); Steve Brookes (Drums); Thomas Collison (Keyboards); Henry Senior Jnr (Pedal steel)
- Past members: Rosalie Deighton 'Free Jazz' Geoff Widdowson; Robin Bennett; Chris Clarke; Trevor Moss & Hannah-Lou; Garo Nahoulaklan
- Website: dannyandthechamps.com

Danny and the Champions of the World are a heartland rock and soul band. Formed in London during the summer of 2007 by Danny George Wilson, the band have since released seven studio albums and two live albums. The band's name is an allusion to the novel Danny, the Champion of the World by Roald Dahl.

== Formation ==
The band was formed following the dissolution of Grand Drive, in which Danny performed with his brother Julian Wilson. They recorded originally as an impromptu demo session at a farm within the grounds of the Truck Festival.

The demo and overall success of the recorded sound prompted Danny to form the band Danny & the Champions of the World. They recorded their first, self-titled, album for Loose Music in 2008. Critics and fans noted a distinct departure from the music of Grand Drive, instead noting a more alt-country sound.

== History ==
Danny and the Champions of the World recorded and released their second album, Streets of Our Time, in 2010. The band released the album on Loose. Danny & the Champions of the World recorded the album whilst on tour, opening for The Magic Numbers, Garth Hudson, and Drive-By Truckers. Streets of Our Time was met with much critical acclaim and shifted the band to a more rock, less folk sound.

In February 2011 Danny Wilson signed a worldwide publishing/production deal with Southern Crossroads Music and went into the studio to record the band's third album, Hearts & Arrows. The album, marked by a distinct heartland rock sound influenced by Bruce Springsteen and the E Street Band, was produced by Tony Poole and Danny Wilson, and mixed by Ted Hutt at his King Size Studios based in Los Angeles, California, United States. The album was released on SO Records in July 2011, and was preceded by a single, You Don't Know (My Heart Is in the Right Place). Wilson recorded Tougher Than The Rest for a limited edition Bruce Springsteen tribute 7-inch EP for Record Store Day 2011, alongside fellow contributors The Magic Numbers, Willie Nile and Billy Franks.

Danny and the Champions of the World released their fourth studio album Stay True on Loose Music in September 2013. It was recorded at North London's Reservoir Studios. The core band were joined by Rosalie Deighton, Melvin Duffy, Trevor Moss & Hannah-Lou and Dreaming Spires Robin & Joe Bennett. The album took a more soulful and improvisational feel. Wilson noted, "the musicians all stood around the microphones in the same room – booze flowing, smoke filling the air, it was like a poker night but with banjos! Generally it felt like we were making something special, I just booked the studio and the guys heard the songs for the first time on the studio floor."

In 2014, the band released their first live album, Live Champs!. In summer 2015, their fifth studio album, What Kind of Love, was released.

On 3 February 2016, Danny and the Champions of the World dominated the inaugural UK Americana Awards, winning UK Artist of the Year, UK Album of the Year for What Kind of Love and UK Song of the Year for Clear Water. In August 2017, the band released their sixth studio album, Brilliant Light, available in both double- and triple-LP formats, the latter featuring an additional album of instrumental tracks.

Danny is instrumental in the London movement "Neckerchief Rock" alongside Radio London DJ Robert Elms, they regularly put on events at local pubs and venues.

== Discography ==
=== Albums ===
- Danny and the Champions of the World (2008, Loose Music)
- Streets of Our Time (2010, Loose Music)
- Hearts & Arrows (2011, SO Records)
- Stay True (2013, Loose Music)
- Live Champs! (2014, Loose Music)
- What Kind of Love (2015, Loose Music)
- Brilliant Light (2017, Loose Music)
- You Are Not A Stranger Here (2024, Loose Music)

=== Singles ===
- "Restless Feet" (2010, Loose Music)
- "You Don't Know (My Heart is in the Right Place)" (2011, SO Records)
