= Daphne's Flight =

Studio album by Daphne's Flight
- Released: April 1996
- Recorded: 14–25 January 1996
- Studio: The Big Room, Kirk Michael, the Isle of Man
- Genre: Folk music, country, jazz, soul
- Length: 52:31
- Label: Fled'gling
- Producer: Daphne's Flight

Daphne's Flight was a collaboration between five female vocalists, instrumentalists, and songwriters in the British folk and roots music scene: Christine Collister, Melanie Harrold, Julie Matthews, Helen Watson and Chris While. The collaboration resulted in a well-reviewed album and a sell-out tour during the mid-1990s. The project helped to cement relationships between the members, raised their individual profiles nationally and internationally and has been seen as marking a turning point in the role of women within the English folk movement. Twenty years after the initial collaboration, Daphne's Flight returned with a new studio album and a live release, and toured extensively. In 2022, Christine Collister left the band for personal reasons and in stepped Miranda Sykes (Show of Hands) bringing a new element to the band with bass as well as vocals. Two tours followed (22, 23) and a new album, ‘Love is the Weapon of Choice’ released on the Fatcat record label.

== History ==
The group made their début at the 1995 Cambridge Folk Festival, where they were one of the hits of the event. This was followed by a major concert at London's prestigious Union Chapel in December. In January 1996 they recorded their eponymous album in ten days, fitted between busy schedules, in The Big Room, Kirk Michael, the Isle of Man. The studio had to be completed by builders working through the night. The result was very positively reviewed in the folk and roots music press and gained considerable mainstream press and media attention. The group followed the release with a popular major 18-date tour of England through May and June 1996.

The project proved a one-off for some time as the members pursued their own careers, but in subsequent years they appeared on and contributed to each other's albums and live appearances. Partial reunions occurred for specific gigs, and in 2003 at the Prebendal Festival they reassembled for a reunion.

As the 20th anniversary of the initial collaboration approached, members of the group began talking of a full-fledged reunion project, which was eventually realized with the release of the critically acclaimed album Knows Time, Knows Change in 2017. The entire 2017 tour was recorded on digital multi-track, from which a third album, Daphne's Flight Live, was assembled and released in 2018. The group continued touring during 2019 and into 2020.

A third studio album, On Arrival, was released at the end of 2019, just but a tour to promote it in early 2020 was postponed due to the COVID-19 pandemic. Live appearances did not resume until 2022 with new member Miranda Sykes. In August 2023, they launched the studio album Love Is the Weapon of Choice at Shrewsbury Festival, receiving a positive response and followed up with a UK tour in September.

== Members and contributions ==
- Christine Collister - vocals, guitar, percussion left in 2022
- Melanie Harrold - vocals, guitar, piano
- Julie Matthews - vocals, guitar, piano, mandolin
- Helen Watson, vocals, guitar, harmonica
- Chris While - vocals, guitar, dulcimer, bodhran, darbuka, percussion
- Miranda Sykes - vocals, bass guitar joined in 2022
