= The Deighton Family =

English folk ensemble

The Deighton Family is an English folk ensemble from Yorkshire, England. The group is led by husband and wife Dave and Josie Deighton, and the five other members are their children, Maya, Arthur, Kathleen, Rosalie and Angelina.

The Deighton Family's first album was released in 1980. Their second album, Acoustic Music to Suit Most Occasions, was named Record of the Year by NPR in the U.S. in 1989. A third full-length album was released in 1991.

Kathleen Deighton-Cousins died from cancer on 24 December 2010.

== Members ==
- Dave Deighton – melodeon, harmonica, fiddle, guitar, vocals
- Josie Deighton – guitar, bodhran
- Maya Deighton – tin whistle, flute
- Arthur Deighton – mandolin, guitar, piano
- Kathleen Deighton – fiddle
- Rosalie Deighton – vocals, drums, mandolin
- Angelina Deighton – drums

== Discography ==
- Mama Was Right (Philo Records, 1980)
- Acoustic Music to Suit Most Occasions (Philo, 1988)
- Rolling Home (Green Linnet Records, 1991)
