= Richard Digance =

English comedian and folk singer

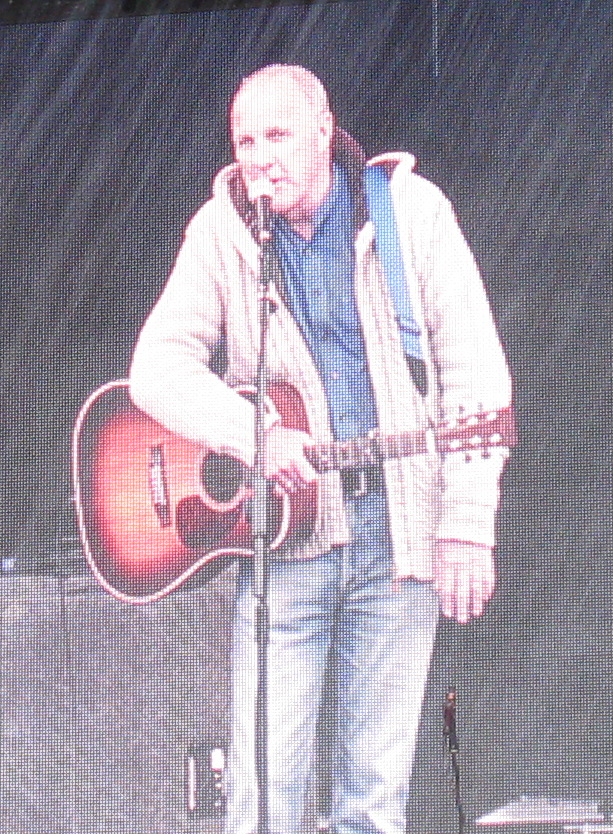
- Digance on screen at the 2010 Cropredy Festival
- Born: 24 February 1949 (age 77); Plaistow, England
- Occupations: Comedian, folk-singer, media executive
- Years active: 1971-present
- Website: www.richarddigance.com

Richard Digance (pronounced DYE-jance; born 24 February 1949) is an English comedian and folk singer.

== Early life ==
Digance was born in Plaistow, east London. After his family moved to nearby East Ham, he attended Vicarage Lane Primary School and then Thomas Lethaby Secondary Modern. After gaining two A-Level passes in English Literature and Modern British History, he moved to Glasgow, where he studied mechanical engineering during which time he was inspired by Billy Connolly.

== Career ==
Richard Digance was a member of British folk band, Pisces, who released an album called Pisces in 1971.

In the 1970s, Digance toured the United States. He supported Steve Martin, whilst in Britain he also supported Jethro Tull on two British tours, Steeleye Span, Tom Jones, Elkie Brooks, Supertramp and Joan Armatrading. From 1974 until 1978 Doug Morter, guitarist and singer with Hunter Muskett, joined Digance as accompanist on vocals and guitar.

Digance began his television career on Sound of The City for Thames TV, produced by Richard Newman, in the early 1970s. This debut appearance was followed by The Old Grey Whistle Test and then the Today programme. The Old Grey Whistle Test was his only BBC TV appearance, except for appearing on The Ronnie Corbett Show years later, and then link-man for BBC2 coverage of The Cambridge Folk Festival. He then became a regular contributor on The Six O'Clock Show with Michael Aspel.

Around this time, Digance also made his first regular radio appearances, contributing songs to Stop The World, a topical comedy show which ran on BBC Radio 2 from 1979 to 1983, and his own show on Capital Radio, Richard Digance And Friends, which was on air from 1979 to 1983..

Digance was given his first television special in 1985 for Thames TV, A Dabble With Digance. He was later signed to TVS in Southampton after being a studio warm-up act for Matthew Kelly and this first series of six programmes was screened on Thursday nights.

Digance left for London Weekend Television under Greg Dyke and filmed numerous Saturday night television specials for ITV. His guests included Status Quo, Brian May, Elkie Brooks, The Moody Blues, Julia Fordham, Chris de Burgh and many others. An additional series with Jim Davidson, Wednesday At 8, made him a popular guest during the period from 1985 to 1995.

Digance made guest appearances on many programmes such as Surprise Surprise with Cilla Black, The Gloria Hunniford Show, The Jim Davidson Show, Des O'Connor Show, Live From The Palladium with Roy Orbison, Magpie, Pebble Mill at One, Saturday Night At The Mill and The Tom O'Connor Show. Digance received a BAFTA nomination as 'TV Entertainer Of The Year'.

He was also a regular guest on the popular Sunday evening Live from... (Her Majesty's/the Piccadilly/the Palladium) variety series (produced by LWT for ITV) and also on Summertime Special, a variety showcase of the 1980s.

He is known for his television one-hour specials, starting in 1985 with A Dabble of Digance. Abracadigance was a series of four shows in 1988. The 1992 show, Richard Digance's Greatest Bits, recorded at the Brighton Dome, included some of his most popular routines from stage and screen.

Appearances on other television specials included HRH The Prince of Wales Princes Trust Galas at the London Palladium with Elton John and Robin Williams, All At Sea, Christmas Eve Forces Special from The Berlin Wall and The Zeebrugge Disaster Concert at The London Palladium.

In the next decade he made two series for Carlton Westcountry TV visiting villages in a Morris Traveller, and using locals as guests. Digance also had a BBC Radio career through the 1980s with his show A Digence Indulgence which had a seven-year run until the summer of 1987.

He has been a frequent guest in 'Dictionary Corner' on the Channel 4 game show Countdown.

In October 2003, he received the Gold Award from the British Academy of Songwriters, Composers and Authors for his services to music.

== Personal life ==
He has two daughters and two grandchildren. He now lives just outside Salisbury, Wiltshire. He semi-retired from live performance in 2021 and now only performs at his favourite theatres.

== Discography ==
- England's Green and Pleasant Land (1974)
- Treading the Boards (1975)
- How the West was Lost (1975)
- In Concert (1975)
- Earl's A Winger (1977)
- Live At The Q.E.H. (1978)
- Commercial Road (1979)
- Homework (1984)
- A Digance Indulgence (1985)
- Richard Digance at the Fairfield Halls (1985)
- A Drop of Digance (1996)
- On a Serious Note (1996)
- Best of the Transatlantic Years (compilation CD) (1997)
- A Varied Selection (1998)
- Guitar Tunes (1998)
- Richard Digance Compilation (2002)
- The New Richard Digance CD (2002)
- Back on Song (2005)
- Past and Present (2007)
- This is Great Britain (2013)
- The Toast of Christmas Past (2013)
- Golden Anniversary (2017)
