= Fairport's Cropredy Convention =

UK annual music festival

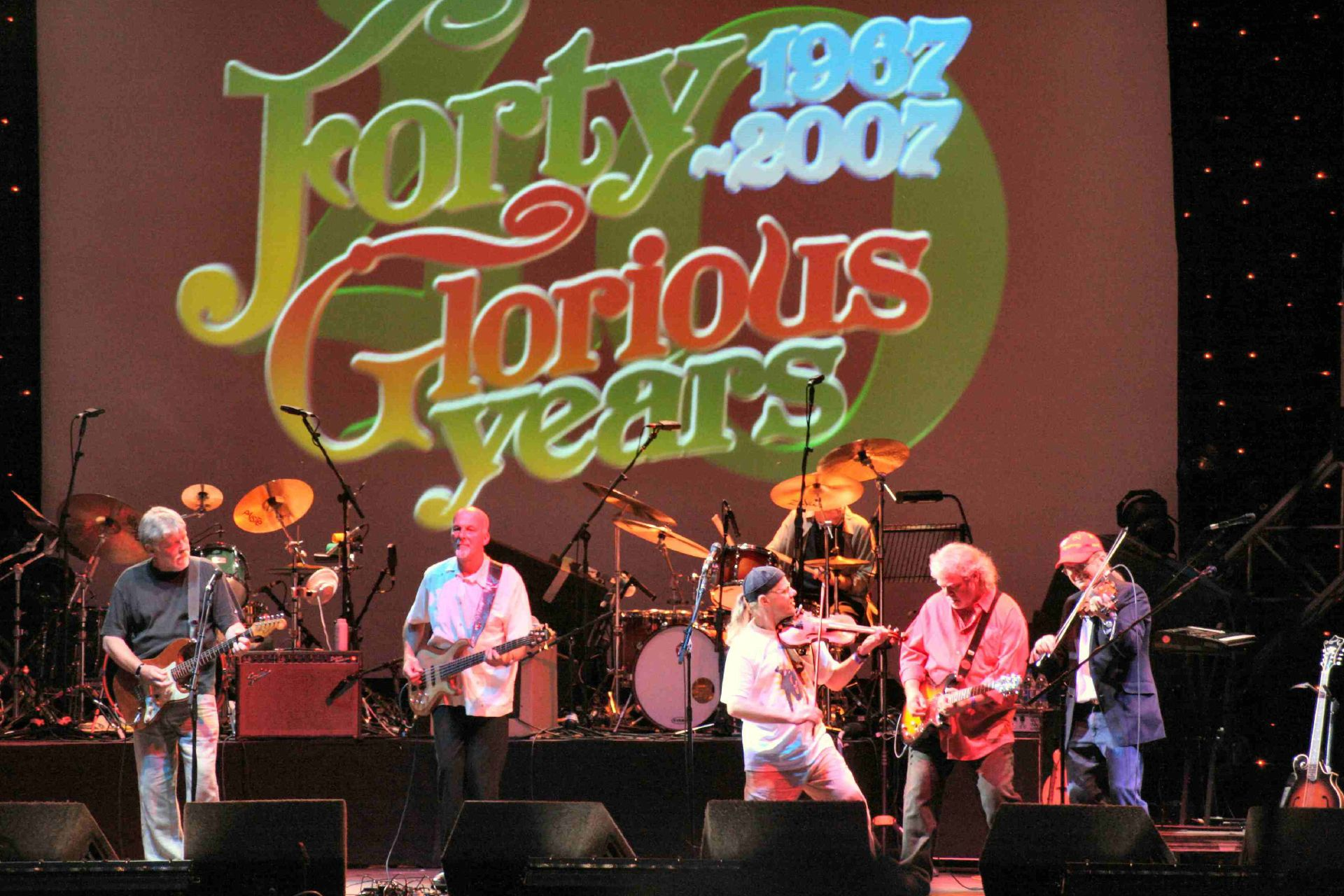
- Genre: Folk; British folk rock; rock; acoustic; punk; reggae; progressive rock
- Dates: Second weekend in August
- Locations: Cropredy, England
- Coordinates: 52.1102°N 1.3102°W
- Years active: 1976–present
- Founders: Fairport Convention
- Capacity: 20,000
- Website: fairportconvention.com

Fairport's Cropredy Convention (formerly Cropredy Festival) is an annual festival of folk and rock music, headed by British folk-rock band Fairport Convention and held on the edge of the village of Cropredy in Oxfordshire, England. The festival has taken place in August annually since 1976.

Fairport's Cropredy Convention attracts up to 20,000 people each year. In 2025 the management reduced the ticket sales down to 6000 to help the festival survive. The festival features a single stage at the lower end of the sloping arena field. There are also ancillary events, such as Morris dancing in the streets and live music at the village's two pubs.

== History ==
The festival began as a private performance to about 750 people by the British folk rock band Fairport Convention in a village back garden in July 1976. The next year the performance was repeated and opened up to the public. In 1978 it was properly organised and moved to a larger site behind the Cropredy village school. It became a significant event in the band's history as they played their farewell performance there on 4 August 1979 to around 4,500 people, who were cheered by a promise to continue with annual reunions. From this point the festival became the main mechanism for preserving the identity of the band and for their many fans to show their appreciation.

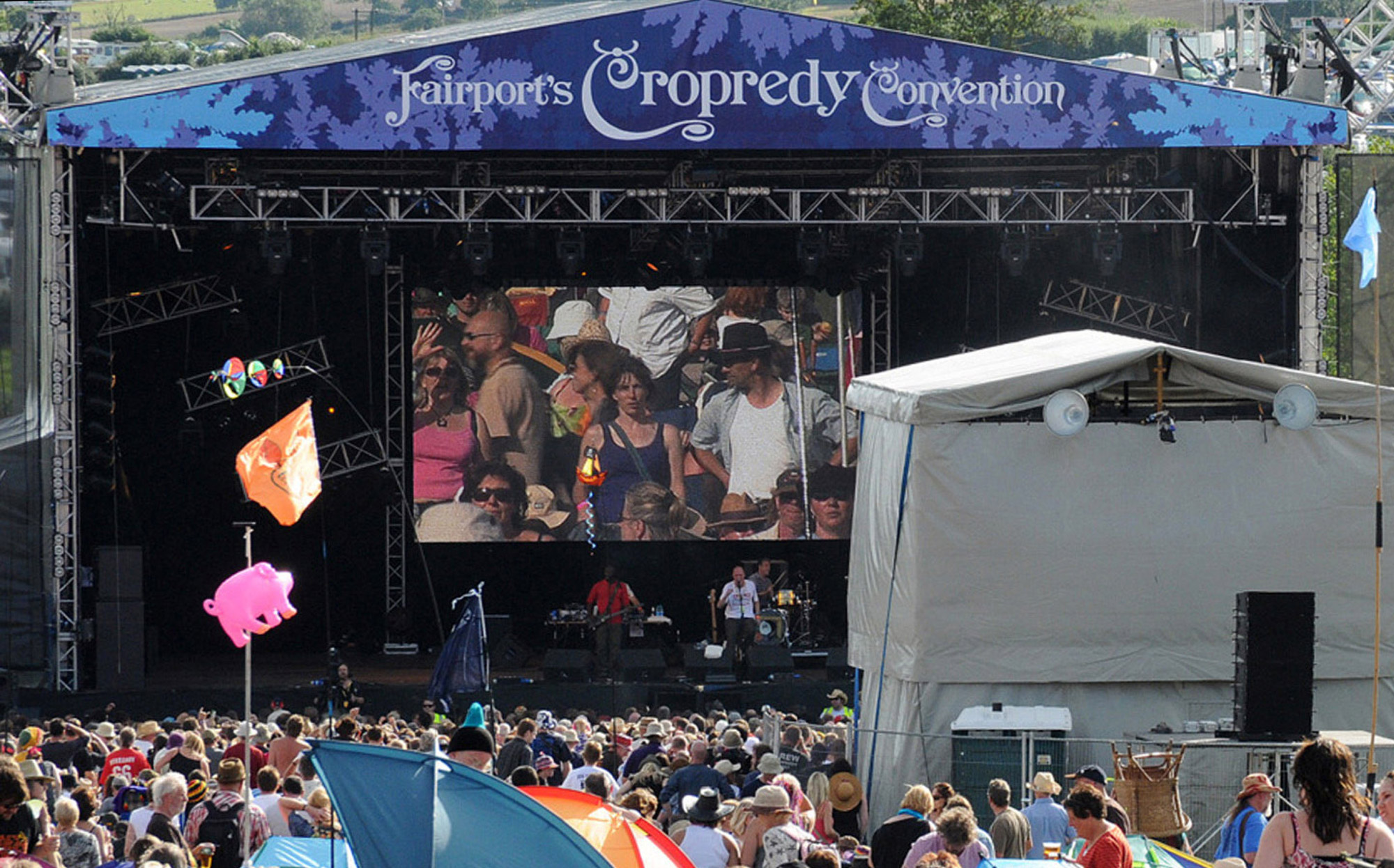
The stage at Fairport's Cropredy Convention festival, Oxfordshire, in August 2009

At the first reunion in 1980 the festival was expanded from a one to a two-day event with increasing numbers of guest acts. In 1981, lacking a suitable site at Cropredy, it was shifted to the grounds of Broughton Castle, a performance released as Moat on the Ledge – Live at Broughton Castle (1982).

The festival returned to Cropredy the next year (and has remained there ever since although the actual site has expanded over the years). Despite the fact that Fairport Convention was not active as a band from 1980 to 1985, the festival continued to grow. After the band reformed in 1985, the festival became Fairport's major platform for showcasing new material as well as revisiting the old.

Between 1981 and 1999, the festival was a two-day event. From 2000, it was expanded to three days—Thursday, Friday and Saturday. The festival takes place on the second full weekend in August. Originally known as just "the Cropredy reunion", the event was branded Cropredy Festival until 2005 when it was retitled Fairport's Cropredy Convention. In 2007, all available tickets were sold in advance for the first time (this would not happen again until 2014).

In 2008, a live on-stage video screen was introduced. The year was also notable because, for the first time, not a single theft from the campsites was reported to festival control over the whole three days, underlining the unique and friendly atmosphere for which the festival is famous.

In 2010, highlights of the festival were televised on Sky Arts for the first time, with a documentary presented by radio DJ and television presenter Bob Harris. This continued through to 2012. In 2013 and 2014 the Whispering Bob Broadcasting Company uploaded highlights of the festival on their YouTube channel. From 2015 onwards, highlights from Fairport Convention's Saturday night set have been uploaded on their official YouTube channel. In 2020 the festival did not take place due to the COVID-19 pandemic and so a broadcast of Richard Thompson and Fairport Convention's full sets from the 2019 festival was streamed on the official YouTube channel.

To celebrate forty years of the festival, a documentary called Summer by The Cherwell was released in 2020.

=== Outline of the festival ===
The event is organised largely by Gareth Williams, the Festival Director, and also Simon Nicol and Dave Pegg, both members of Fairport. Fairport themselves open the festival on the Thursday evening with an acoustic set, and close the festival on the Saturday night.

The majority of attendees camp for the duration of the festival. There are eight separate camping fields adjacent to the arena, one of which is reserved for family parties. Fairport's Cropredy Convention is aimed at all ages with an emphasis on families and has developed a reputation as a particularly friendly and safe festival.

As well as a wide range of live music, the event features three dozen stalls selling clothing, books, CDs and food. It also boasts a very large bar which specialises in cask ale which was formerly provided by Wadworth, a brewery based in Devizes, Wiltshire until 2020. Hook Norton Brewery took over the bar for the 2021 festival, serving their real ales, real cider, wines and spirit.

The bar is used by festival-goers and performers alike (there is no back-stage bar), making Cropredy one of the few major festivals where the public can mingle with the musicians playing there.

In recent years, the running times for live music have been 4 p.m. until 11 p.m. on the Thursday and noon until midnight on the Friday and Saturday.

Over time, there has been a wider spread of genres of music, expanding out from the original folk roots of the festival. Status Quo, the Buzzcocks, Dreadzone and Supergrass have played at Cropredy in recent years. Among many well-known acts appearing in recent years are Robert Plant, Alice Cooper, Lonnie Donegan, Procol Harum, Steeleye Span, Eliza Carthy, Yusuf Islam and Oysterband (see below for others).

=== The pre-Cropredy "warm-ups" ===
On the Monday and Tuesday before the festival each year, fans get a foretaste of what is to come at the festival when Fairport Convention stage "warm-up" concerts at a local club venue. Until 2007 these concerts were held at the Mill Arts Centre in Banbury. From 2007 until 2010 the concerts were held at Woodford Halse Social Club (Woodford Halse is a village in Northamptonshire approximately nine miles northeast of Cropredy) but returned to The Mill in 2011.

In 2017 the warm-ups moved from The Mill to Banbury Trades And Labour Club, following in the footsteps of P J Wright (fellow band-member with Dave Pegg in the Dylan Project) who had moved his annual TRADarrr pre-Cropredy Wednesday gig to the same venue in 2016.

== Appearances ==
These performers are generally listed with the headline act last.

=== 2023 ===
On 12 December 2022 it was announced that the festival would be happening on 10, 11 and 12 August 2023 with headliners 10cc on the Friday and other sets by Toyah & Robert Fripp, Kiki Dee & Carmelo Luggeri, Gilbert O’Sullivan and the UK farewell performance from Strawbs.

=== 2022 ===
Thursday 11 August 2022

- The Trevor Horn Band
- Clannad
- Edward II
- Thumping Tommys
- Fairport Convention Acoustic

Friday 12 August 2022

- Steve Hackett - Genesis Revisited
- Turin Brakes
- Sharon Shannon
- Slambovian Circus of Dreams
- Martyn Joseph
- Home Service
- Emily Barker
- Maddie Morris

Saturday 13 August 2022

- Fairport Convention & Friends (inc Full House)
- Richard Thompson
- The Matthews Baartmans Experience
- Rosalie Cunningham
- The Bar-Steward Sons of Val Doonican
- Holy Moly & The Crackers
- Seth Lakeman

=== 2021 ===
In 2021 the festival did not take place due to the COVID-19 pandemic.

=== 2020 ===
In 2020 the festival did not take place due to the COVID-19 pandemic.

=== 2019 ===
Thursday 8 August 2019

- Fairport Acoustic
- Lil'Jim
- Tors
- Gogol Bordello
- The Waterboys

Friday 9 August 2019

- The 4 of Us
- Wildwood Kin
- Will Pound & Eddy Jay
- Wilson & Wakeman
- Caravan
- Seth Lakeman
- Richard Thompson & Friends
- Frank Turner & the Sleeping Souls

Saturday 10 August 2019

- Richard Digance
- Daphne's Flight
- Tide Lines
- Zal Cleminson's /sin'dogs/
- Martin Barre Band plays 50 years of Jethro Tull
- Martin Simpson
- Fairport Convention & Friends

=== 2018 ===
Thursday 9 August 2018

- Fairport Acoustic
- Smith & Brewer
- Police Dog Hogan
- Oysterband
- Brian Wilson Presents Pet Sounds

Friday 10 August 2018

- Mera Royle & friends (Scran) (BBC R2 YFA Winner)
- Midnight Skyracer
- The Travelling Band
- Cregan & Co
- Le Vent Du Nord
- Fish
- Kate Rusby
- Levellers

Saturday 11 August 2018

- Richard Digance
- Eric Sedge
- The Bar-Steward Sons of Val Doonican
- Will Varley
- Sam Kelly & The Lost Boys
- Afro Celt Sound System
- Al Stewart
- Fairport Convention & Friends

=== 2017 ===
Thursday 10 August 2017

- Fairport Acoustic Convention
- Feast of Fiddles
- Show of Hands
- The Trevor Horn Band
- The Divine Comedy

Friday 11 August 2017

- Josie Duncan and Pablo Lafuente
- The Gerry Colvin Band
- Quill
- Gigspanner Big Band
- CC Smugglers
- Pierce Brothers
- Petula Clark
- Richard Thompson

Saturday 12 August 2017

- Morris On
- Judy Dyble and the Band of Perfect Strangers
- Plainsong
- Cats in Space
- Marillion
- Dougie MacLean
- Fairport Convention & Friends

=== 1976 to 2016 ===
Appearances prior to 2017 are documented at Fairport's Cropredy Convention appearances.

== See also ==
- List of folk festivals
- List of historic rock festivals
