= Christine Collister =

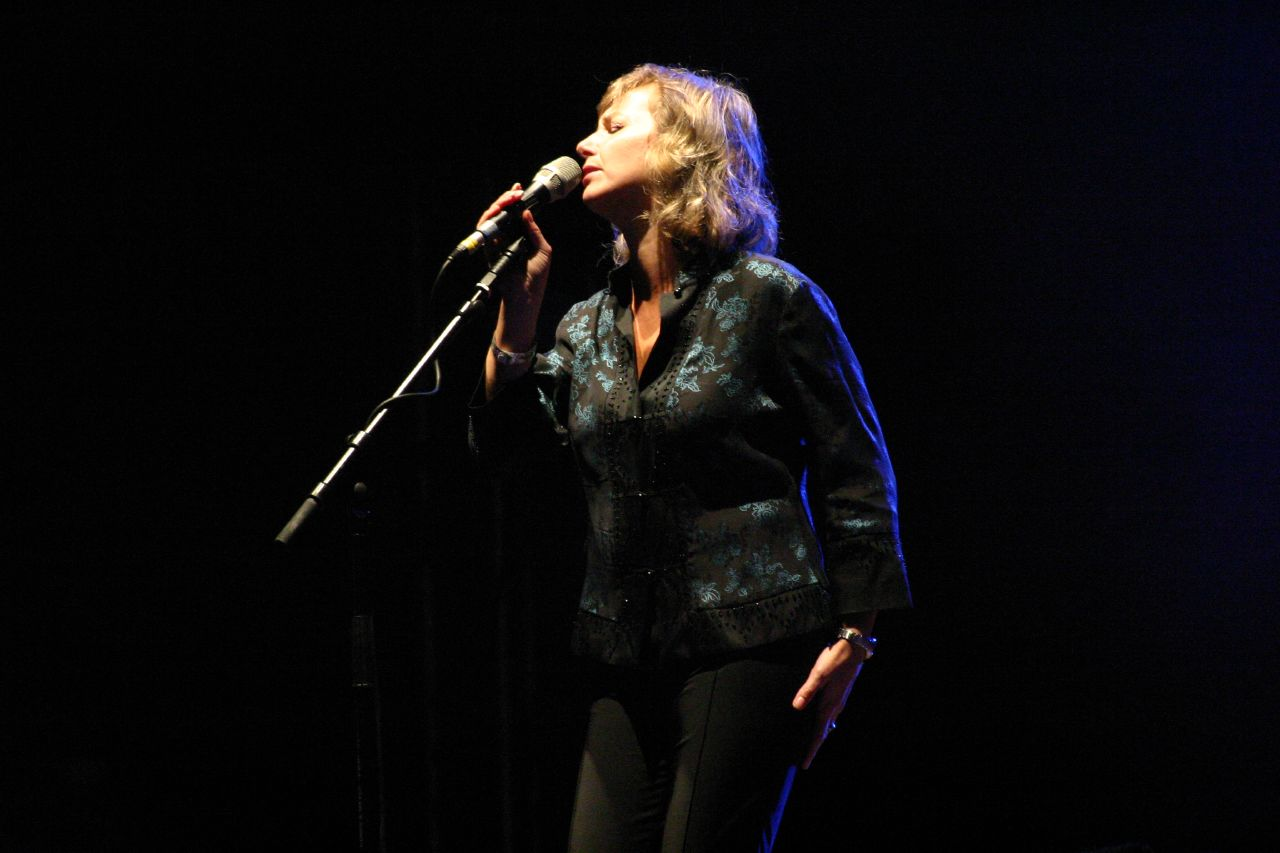
- Collister at the Cropredy Festival; Oxfordshire, 12 August 2005

Background information
- Born: 28 December 1961 (age 64); Douglas, Isle of Man
- Genres: Folk, blues, jazz, country
- Occupations: Musician, songwriter, record producer
- Instrument: Vocals
- Years active: 1985-present
- Labels: Topic Records, Fledgling Records
- Formerly of: Daphne's Flight
- Website: www.christinecollister.com

Christine Collister (born 28 December 1961) is a Manx folk, blues and jazz singer-songwriter. She was born and grew up on the Isle of Man and first came to public attention in 1986 as the singer of the theme song for the BBC's television adaptation of Fay Weldon's book The Life and Loves of a She-Devil.

== Career ==
Collister was born in Douglas, Isle of Man.

In 1985, she joined the Richard Thompson Band as a backing vocalist, also singing with Thompson on many songs which had been previously performed as duets with ex-wife and former collaborator Linda Thompson. Collister was a part of this band for four years, contributing vocals on six albums and participating in several world tours. There followed seven years working with singer, songwriter and guitar player, Clive Gregson. During this period, the couple released five albums, starting with their first and most successful album, Home and Away. After being unavailable for some years, the albums were re-released on CD around 2010.

Collister has released several solo albums since 1994, including Live, Blue Aconite, Dark Gift of Time and the compilation CD Songbird all for Fledgling Records, and An Equal Love and Into The Light for Topic Records. She has worked with the Isle of Man-based Stereo Scout Records, part of the Running Media Management Group, with whom she recorded a live album entitled Home in 2004, and her 20th Anniversary DVD entitled XX in 2005, plus a series of solo albums including Under Construction (volumes 1 and 2) and Feminine Logic. Collister also produced an acclaimed vinyl cut for hi-fi manufacturer REGA, entitled Love. The project was a collection of mainly cover songs, including tracks by Jim Croce, Kate Bush and Joni Mitchell, as well as a version of the Leonard Cohen song, "Hallelujah".

In 1996, Collister recorded and toured with the all-female group Daphne's Flight and, in 2017, they celebrated 21 years of Daphne's Flight, regrouping to record and tour around a second album Knows Time, Knows Change (Fledgling). This led to the recording of a third album scheduled for release in May 2020, with a tour and festival dates already planned.

Collister has also recorded and toured with the vocal ensemble Hell Bent Heaven Bound and with Dave Kelly with the "Travelling Gentlemen" also featuring Peter Filleul (ex Climax Blues Band) on piano and third harmony. Kelly and Collister have also continued to frequently tour as a duo, including festivals in Canada and the UK.

In 2007, Collister moved from the UK, back to the Isle of Man, and since 2015, has been working and collaborating with Australian guitarist Michael Fix. They recorded an album, Shadows and Light in 2017, and toured around its release that same year and again in 2018, including Port Fairy, Cobargo and Illawarra festivals in Australia, and a two-week tour in the UK. In October 2019, they released their second album North & South and embarked on a 15 date tour of the UK, with a further 20 date tour in Australia scheduled for early 2020.

Collister continues to work and record as a solo artist, and as a songwriter including collaborations with Michael Fix, Mike Slamer, Pam Shane, Steve Lima, Rob Laufer, Lindsay Rowe and many others. She remains in demand as a session vocalist, performing on album projects including Lena Anderson's Eagle in the Sky, The Parlour Ballads, and an upcoming album from US artist Brooks Williams. Collister has also contributed lyrics for publication in Playerist Poetry Magazine (ISSN 2048-2515).

She was invited to perform at the Royal Albert Hall in London on 30 September 2019 in a concert celebrating the 70th birthday of Richard Thompson, along with David Gilmour, Martin Carthy, Eliza Carthy, Hugh Cornwell, Olivia Chaney, Maddie Prior, Loudon Wainwright III, Teddy Thompson, Kami Thompson, Danny Thompson, Dave Mattacks, Judith Owen, and many others. Collister proved a highlight of the evening with the Financial Times reviewer reporting " ..best of all perhaps was Thompson and Collister reviving the protest ballad 'Sweetheart On the Barricade'... " and... "Collister with Thompson on 'Ghosts in the Wind' was a thrilling highlight ..."

In 2024, Collister released Children of the Sea, a project of nine original songs and an accompanying book inspired by Manx folklore. Children of the Sea was supported by grants from the Isle of Man Arts Council and Culture Vannin and was the focus of Collister's 2024 UK tour.
