= Pop Maynard =

English folk singer (1872–1962)

- George 'Pop' Maynard. Copthorne, West Sussex, England, 1953

Background information
- Born: George Maynard; 6 January 1872; Smallfield, Burstow, Surrey, England
- Origin: Sussex
- Died: 29 November 1962 (aged 90) Copthorne, West Sussex, England
- Genre: Folk music

George "Pop" Maynard (6 January 1872 – 29 November 1962) was an English folk singer and marbles champion. The folk singer Shirley Collins considers Maynard to have been the "finest traditional English singer, matched only by Harry Cox".

== Life and family ==
George Maynard was born on 6 January 1872 or, as he put it, on Old Christmas Day in Smallfield, Burstow, Surrey, about 2 mi (3.2 km) north of the village of Copthorne, West Sussex, where he lived for his entire life. He was the eleventh of twelve children of James Maynard and his wife Elizabeth (née Skinner), four of whom died in infancy. Maynard was baptised on 3 February 1872 at the Church of St Bartholomew in Burstow, when his father's profession was given as "labourer".

Maynard attended school on-and-off until the age of 12. He worked with his father and brothers, in the winter as a woodman cutting wood for the hoop trade, in the summer harvesting, hedging and ditching. He and his family also supplemented their income by poaching rabbits and pheasants. He did not regret his poaching, saying "I should go out again if I had my time over again, before I should let my family go short of anything."

Every year for 52 years Maynard would travel to Kent to work in the hop fields. The 1939 Register was taken on 29 September during the hop season, and Maynard, then aged 57, was registered at Moorden Farm, Leigh, Kent that night. During one of these annual trips, Maynard met his wife Mary Ann (Polly) Wiles, at a hop farm called Salmans Farm, Chiddingstone, Kent. They married in September 1895 in Chiddingstone.

The couple had seven children, of whom two daughters and four sons survived to adulthood. They lived at first in a tiny house in Borer's Yard, Copthorne, then in a cottage in Spring Gardens, Copthorne. Polly died in 1920, and Maynard remained a widower for more than 40 years. He died on 29 November 1962.

== Music ==
Pop Maynard: The Seeds of Love (extract)
The Seeds of Love [trad.]

In Maynard's youth there was no recorded music, and singing was part of the family and the community.

The idea that a singer was someone exclusive was not there then. Everybody sang. Some sung well, some didn't, but singing was as normal as breathing. We sang up the woods, we sang anywhere. You sang when you felt in the mood - you'd be in the pub and someone would start a song and all of a sudden the whole place lit up. It was never, "Well, let's have a sing" - it either happened or it didn't.

Maynard learned songs from his father and other family members. He augmented his repertoire by learning songs from ballad sheets (broadsides) that were hawked round the villages. Itinerant workers also brought new material. Maynard picked up songs during his annual migration to the hop fields, for example "The Irish Hop-Pole Puller", a cockney comic song. At the hop farms there were Londoners and workers from Ireland and from other counties of England, and evenings and Sundays were spent drinking and singing. At home, Maynard, who admitted to feeling lonely after being widowed, was in one of the local pubs most evenings, singing and playing traditional games, such as shove ha'penny, skittles, quoits, darts, and marbles.

Maynard's repertoire as recorded by Ken Stubbs comprised 65 songs. The recordings were selective, and Stubbs estimated that Maynard's complete repertoire of songs committed to memory would have been in the hundreds. Maynard and his community were not concerned about the sources of their songs, singing popular songs of the day as well as traditional material, but the folk-song collectors dismissed the songs of music hall origin as unauthentic, and few of them were recorded, a choice which Stubbs came to regret. According to Stubbs, Maynard's personal favourites were the traditional broken-token song "The Banks of Claudy" (Roud 266), which he had sung at his own wedding and those of his children, an Irish song "The Brave Irish Soldier" (Roud 3226), and one of music hall origin, "The Old Rustic Bridge" (Roud 3792). Some songs were original lyrics to traditional tunes, for example "Shooting Goshen's Cocks Up" (Roud 902), written by Maynard's friend Fred Holman to celebrate a poaching incident. Poaching was a favourite topic for songs in Maynard's repertoire, for example "The Gallant Poachers" (Roud 793) and "While Gamekeepers Lie Sleeping" (Roud 363), as well as songs about the sea.

Much of his repertoire was also sung by the Copper Family, although there had been little interchange between the Weald musicians including Maynard, and the Coppers over the South Downs in Rottingdean. Several of Maynard's favoured songs, including "Banks of Claudy" and "While Gamekeepers Lie Sleeping", are better known in versions by the Coppers. A few songs seem to have come uniquely from Maynard though. Maynard's longevity meant that he provided a bridge between the first (transcription-based) and second (field-recording-based) British folk revivals and kept alive songs which might otherwise have been forgotten. As Mike Yates noted:

Many of these songs, once common, are now seldom encountered. Cecil Sharp, for instance, noted four versions of "Locks and Bolts" at the turn of the century as did George Gardiner also. However, to my knowledge, Pop is the only English singer to have been recorded singing it—a sad come-down for this splendid ballad ... The same can be said for his version of "A Sailor in the North Country" ... which must once have enjoyed a widespread popularity, judging by its frequent appearance on song sheets.

== Influence ==
Maynard's repertoire and style were influential on the emerging folk singers of the second folk revival. His songs were recorded by Bert Lloyd, Cyril Tawney, Peter Bellamy, Martin Carthy, and many others. He was noted for his ear for pitch, strong sense of rhythm, and smooth phrasing. In an interview in 2017, Shirley Collins described her encounters with Maynard in his final years.

I used to go to Cecil Sharp House to look in the library and listen to recordings. One day in the cellar was a Sussex singer in his 70s [sic] called George Maynard. To meet this man and hear him sing in the flesh was absolutely wonderful, even though his voice was old — a bit like the one I've got now. You can't keep your beautiful voice all your life. I fell in love with both George and "Polly on the Shore", which is a song about a sea battle, and the loss of love and life during the Napoleonic wars.

When Collins recorded "Polly on the Shore" on her 1970 album Love, Death and the Lady with her sister Dolly, she wrote:

From George Maynard, of Copthorne, Sussex. It was one of the great good fortunes in my life to hear George sing in the flesh, back in 50's. Even though he was then in his eighties, he was still able to sing tunefully and gracefully, and had a remarkable stock of songs. He was a complete countryman, and well-known as a marbles and shove ha'penny player. ... This song epitomes George to me, with its sweetness and dignity.

Maynard remains significant to the next generation of traditional singers. Folk supergroup The Furrow Collective, winner of Best Group in the 2017 BBC Folk Awards, included "Our Captain Calls" from Maynard's repertoire on their 2014 album At Our Next Meeting. Singer Emily Portman wrote:

Martin Carthy introduced me to George "Pop" Maynard's singing when I was 17. It was the first time I'd heard anything quite like it: an old man with a crackling voice, banging his stick to keep time and gripping me with his storytelling. It was the first song I performed unaccompanied and it brought about a sea-change in my whole approach to singing.

== The second British folk revival ==
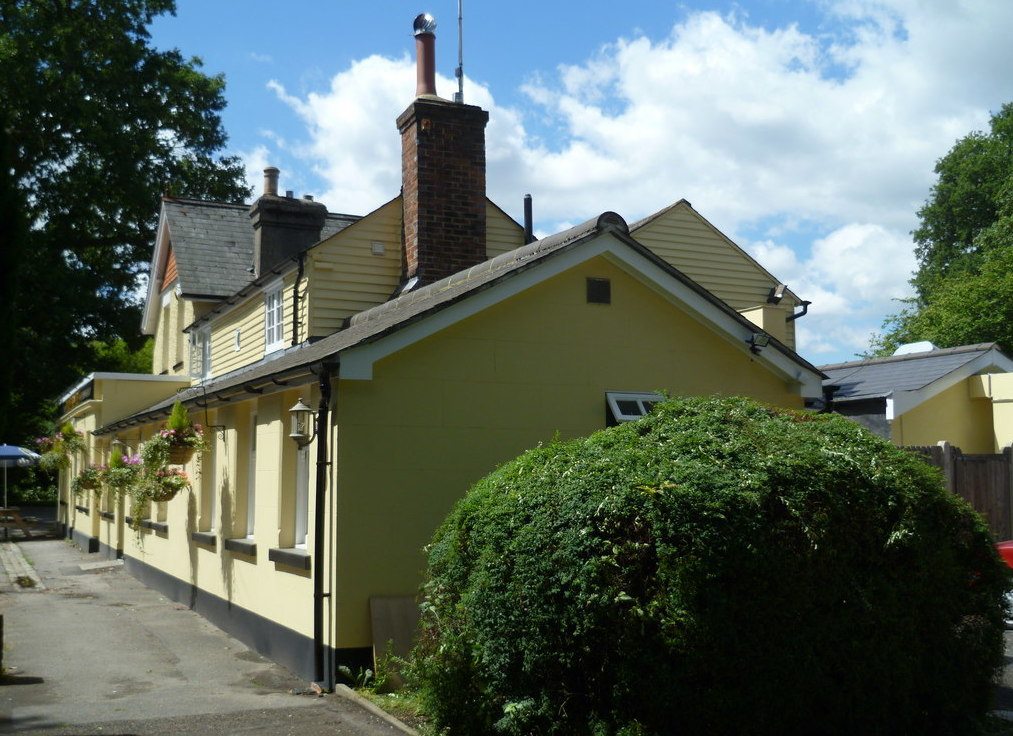
The Cherry Tree in 2011. This pub was the location of many of the field recordings of Maynard made in the 1950s and 60s.

From the early 1950s, the second British folk revival brought for the first time an interest in Maynard's music from outside his immediate circle. He was "collected" over this period by many folklorists, including Peter Kennedy, Mervyn Plunkett, Reg Hall, Ken Stubbs and Frank Purslow, and all known recordings of him date from this period, the last ten years of his life.

Plunkett had recorded Maynard in 1955 and was organising music sessions in local Sussex pubs. Kennedy was one of the presenters of the BBC folk music radio programme As I Roved Out, which was broadcast during the 1950s, and he brought a team to one of these sessions, at the Cherry Tree pub in Copthorne, in February 1956. The session included traditional musicians and singers, including Maynard, and also step dancers.

The programme was broadcast on the BBC Light Programme on 24 June 1956, and brought with it increasing fame for Maynard. At the same time Kennedy recorded 14 of the 15 tracks that would comprise Maynard's Topic Records album Ye Subjects of England, though this would not be released until 1976. The only commercial recording that was released during Maynard's lifetime was his track "Polly on the Shore" recorded by Plunkett in 1956 for the EP 4 Sussex Singers, though this was only released in 1961.

In October 1957, Plunkett organised a coach trip to Cecil Sharp House for the English Music Festival, a competitive event run by the English Folk Dance and Song Society (EFDSS). The party included Maynard and three other singers, and a full band of local musicians, including Reg Hall. Hall describes it as "a great day out", but the music had a mixed reception.

We shocked many of the people there and confused some of the adjudicators, who were used to genteel settings of folk songs. One of them, The Times music critic, criticised Pop Maynard for allegedly not knowing his words and for having a poor standing posture. Very few of the audience had ever heard a country singer before, and even fewer had ever heard country pub music. Some of them, it seemed, were excited by it.

The trips did continue though. Maynard performed three times on BBC radio, noting that "we went on three different times, and they gave us a guinea each, each time." Plunkett brought several musicians including Maynard to perform in A Sussex Concert at Cecil Sharp House in March 1958, and later to make a second attempt at the EFDSS English Music Festival competition. The day after the festival, 11 October 1958, they took part in a grand concert Folk Music of the British Isles organised by the EFDSS at the Royal Festival Hall. Maynard, now 86 years old, was brought on to the RFH stage to sing two verses of "Rolling in the Dew" in his usual unaccompanied style, and was then expected to hand over to Jeannie Robertson to finish the song. The intention was to demonstrate the assimilation process in folk music, showing a Sussex song being adapted by a Scottish singer, but Hall observed that "Pop was confused and upset and Jeannie was clearly embarrassed by such unimaginably crass stage direction." Hamish Henderson glossed over the event in his notes about "Rolling in the Dew" on Robertson's 1960 EP Lord Donald: "In 1958, in the Royal Festival Hall, Jeanne made a hit with this song after Sussex veteran, Pop Maynard, had given his own fine traditional version."

An extensive collection of hitherto-unknown pub recordings of Maynard, made by Brian Matthews in 1959–60, was released by Musical Traditions Records in 2000 as a double CD Down the Cherry Tree. Described as "for completists", having been recorded on basic equipment in a noisy pub environment, this complements the more selective Maynard tracks, also recorded by Matthews, on the same label's Sussex compilation Just Another Saturday Night.

Maynard was last known to sing in public at his 90th birthday party in the Cherry Tree, Copthorne, in January 1962.

== Marbles ==
In his lifetime, Maynard acquired celebrity for his marbles-playing well before he was known outside his locality for his singing. His nickname "Pop" was a tribute to his skill at marble-popping.

The British and World Marbles Championship is said to date back to 1588. The modern competition takes place every Good Friday at the Greyhound pub in Tinsley Green, West Sussex, and has run continuously since 1932, with exceptions for World War II and the 2020 COVID-19 pandemic.

Maynard was first a member of a world champion team when Copthorne defeated the London Passenger Transport Board in 1941. In subsequent world championships, Maynard was filmed regularly and appeared on British Pathé News.

When the Copthorne Spitfires won the world championship in 1948, Maynard was team captain, and he was seen on national television. In 1949 the Copthorne Spitfires lost in the semi-finals, when the commentator noted:

Marbles skill is handed down from father to sons, as from Pop Maynard, 73, to sons Arthur, Perce and George. The Copthorne Spitfires, an all-Maynard family team (Note: The local newspaper had anticipated before the 1949 tournament the appearance not only of Maynard's sons and grandsons, but also his father – "If he is fit, 93-year-old Mr. Maynard will watch his 75-year-old son 'Pop'", and McCarthy too asserts that "93-year-old Mr. Maynard was on hand to watch his 75-year-old son 'Pop'". This claim was also made in earlier years and in other newspapers, and was presumably a deliberate joke by the Maynard family. Pop Maynard's father James would have been in his 116th year if he had been alive in 1949. The 93-year-old was probably Maynard's eldest brother Jonathan Maynard (March 1856 – May 1949), and this is supported by the Daily Mirror – "His elder brother comes over to cheer him – he's 94 [sic].") play Tinsley Green in the semi-final.

Maynard continued to compete through the 1950s. In July 1954, his reputation brought Maynard the opportunity to fly to Le Touquet at the invitation of its mayor to play exhibition matches. His final world championship was Easter 1962, in the year of his death at the age of 90. Marbles historian Sam McCarthy recalls the official commentator describing Maynard's play that year to be "as quick and agile as a two-year-old".

== Sources ==
=== Discography ===
All known releases are listed below. Tracks re-issued on compilations are not listed.

4 Sussex Singers (EP, Collector Records (Note: of Charing Cross Road, London, not Collector Records.) JEB7, UK, 1961)
Recorded by Mervyn Plunkett. There is one track from each of George Spicer, Pop Maynard, Jean Hopkins and Jim Wilson. Maynard sings Polly on the Shore (Roud 811), recorded in West Hoathly in October 1956.
No longer available.

Rumpsy Bumpsy: Pop's in the Pub (Cassette, Folktracks 080-C60, UK, 1975. Later as CD, Folktrax FTX-280)
Recorded by Peter Kennedy in The Cherry Tree public house in Copthorne, February 1956. Some of this material was used for Kennedy's radio programme As I Roved Out. Features Maynard with a chorus of friends, including George Holman, Jean Hopkins, Mervyn Plunkett and Ken Stubbs.
No longer available.

Ye Subjects of England: Traditional Songs From Sussex (LP, Topic Records 12T286, UK, 1976. Also as digital download TSDL286, UK, 2009)
Recorded by Peter Kennedy in Maynard's home, Copthorne, Sussex, 3 December 1955.
Recordings from this session also appear on several volumes of the Topic anthology The Voice of the People and other Topic compilations.

Rolling in the Dew: "Pop" Maynard at Home (Cassette, Folktracks 427-C60, UK, 1985. Later as CD, Folktrax FTX-279)
Songs and interviews recorded by Peter Kennedy at Maynard's cottage December 1955.
No longer available.

Down the Cherry Tree (CD, Musical Tradition Records MTCD 400-401 UK, 2000)
All the songs and fragments Brian Matthews recorded from Pop Maynard in 1959-60, at three of his local pubs.
A selection from Matthews' recordings also appears on Just Another Saturday Night (MTCD 309-310, 2000).

=== Audio-visual collections ===
Sussex Traditions
The Sussex Traditions database of Sussex Folklife and Lore has drawn together material about Maynard from several sources. They include
- Clippings about Maynard from local newspaper the East Grinstead Courier.
- Audio recording of a thirty-minute interview with Maynard conducted by Ken Stubbs.
- Field recordings of Maynard, made by Ken Stubbs, Brian Matthews, Tony Wales and Jim Ward.
- Transcriptions from the Plunkett Collection of lyrics of field recordings.
- Transcriptions made by Ken Stubbs from his field recordings of Maynard's singing, published in Stubbs' book of folk songs The Life of a Man.

Vaughan Williams Memorial Library
The library holds field recordings of Maynard by Ken Stubbs and Brian Matthews, and song transcriptions by Mervyn Plunkett and Frank Purslow in its digital archive.

British Library Sounds

Reg Hall English, Irish & Scottish Folk Music & Customs Collection
Includes field recordings of Maynard made by Mervyn Plunkett, Frank Purslow, Ken Stubbs, and Reg Hall himself.
Peter Kennedy Collection
None of Kennedy's field recordings of Maynard were provided to the British Library as part of this collection, but it includes a few photographs of Maynard.

== See also ==
- Music of Sussex
