= Archangel Hill =

Studio album by Shirley Collins
- Released: 26 May 2023
- Recorded: 2022 (Note: All tracks were recorded at Metway Studios in 2022, except "Hand and Heart", which was recorded live at the Sydney Opera House in 1980.)
- Studio: Metway (Brighton)
- Genre: English folk
- Length: 37:28
- Label: Domino
- Producer: Ian Kearey

Shirley Collins chronology
Heart's Ease (2020)	Archangel Hill (2023)

Archangel Hill is a 2023 studio album by British folk musician Shirley Collins. It has received positive reviews from critics.

== Critical reception ==
Professional ratings
Aggregate scores
Source	Rating
Metacritic	84/100
Review scores
Source	Rating
AllMusic	4/5 stars
Mojo	4/5 stars
MusicOMH	4.5/5 stars
The Observer	4/5 stars
Uncut	4/5 stars

According to the review aggregator Metacritic, Archangel Hill received "universal acclaim" based on a weighted average score of 84 out of 100 from seven critic scores. Editors at AllMusic rated this album 4 out of 5 stars, with critic Mark Deming writing that this "offers a brief taste of what Collins was like as a performer shortly before [Collins]' retirement" which lasted almost 40 years, concluding with 2016's Lodestar and he sums up that this album "documents a singular artist with a tremendous command of her gifts". Mojo's Jim Wirth gave this album 4 out of 5 stars, summing up that with "its own low-key sparkle Archangel Hill stands testament to a musical third act every bit as engaging as anything that went before". Ben Hogwood of musicOMH rated Archangel Hill 4.5 out of 5 stars, calling it "another life-affirming encounter with a remarkable artist" that "once again shows her ability to communicate with her listeners as though they are the only people in the room". NPR's Jonathan Williger characterizes this release as "sagelike, Collins presents these songs as a testament to a life well lived, all its sentimental nooks and crannies fully intact" and ending "that sincerity, the bridge between now and then, is the great gift of Collins' music and underpins the power of these songs that have resonated throughout her homeland and her life". Neil Spencer of The Observer gave this work 4 out of 5 stars, writing that "weathered tones come with unforced gravitas" in Collins' voice. Jim Hilton of The Quietus noted that there was some jubilance the music and additionally, "the songs speak of departure, displacement, pursuit, kidnap, long journeying and delayed arrival". In Uncut, Louis Pattison rated it 4 out of 5 stars, stating that "one of the things that fascinates about Archangel Hill is listening to the way Collins' relationship with this material has changed over time", including how Collins' voice has aged.

Archangel Hill in best-of lists
Outlet	Listing	Rank
AllMusic	Favorite Folk & Americana Albums	—N/a
Mojo	The 75 Best Albums of 2023	36
musicOMH	musicOMH's Top 50 Albums Of 2023	15
The Quietus	Quietus Albums of the Year 2023	23
Uncut	The 75 Best Albums of 2023	22

Uncut editor Michael Bonner included this album on his list of the best of the year.

== Track listing ==
All tracks are traditionals, except where noted.

1. "Fare Thee Well My Dearest Dear" – 3:16
2. "Lost in a Wood" – 3:00
3. "The Captain with the Whiskers" (T.H. Bayley, Alfred Mullens) – 2:46
4. "June Apple" – 1:52
5. "The Golden Glove" – 3:11
6. "High and Away" (Pip Barnes) – 3:55
7. "Oakham Poachers" – 2:19
8. "Hares on the Mountain" – 3:08
9. "Hand and Heart" (F.C. Ball) – 2:19
10. "The Bonny Labouring Boy" – 3:21
11. "Swaggering Boney" – 1:42
12. "How Far Is It to Bethlehem?" (Frances Alice Chesterton) – 2:06
13. "Archangel Hill" (Shirley Collins) – 4:33

== Personnel ==
Shirley Collins and the Lodestar Band

- Shirley Collins – vocals (tracks 1–3, 5–10, 12, 13), arrangement (1, 2, 5, 7, 9–12),
- Dave Arthur – snare drum (tracks 3, 4), arrangement (3, 4, 11), banjo (3), harmonica (5), shruti box (10)
- Pip Barnes – electric guitar (5), acoustic guitar (10–12), arrangement (10, 11)
- Pete Cooper – viola (tracks 1, 12), fiddle (3–5, 11), arrangement (3, 4, 11), mandolin (3, 4)
- Ian Kearey – production, arrangement (all tracks); bass guitar (tracks 1, 3, 5, 7, 11), 12-string guitar (1), acoustic guitar (2, 5, 8), celesta (2, 6), electric guitar (6, 12, 13), acoustic 12-string guitar (7), piano (8, 12), bottleneck electric guitar (8), tiple (12); treated piano, melodeon (11); whistle (12)
- Glen Redman – drum (tracks 5, 11); arrangement, dance (11)

Additional contributors

- Matthew Cooper – design
- Winsome Evans – harpsichord (track 9)
- Archangel Hill – wind (track 13)
- Barry Grint – mastering at Alchemy Mastering
- Peter Messer – artwork painting
- Peter Schuler – painting photography
- Al Scott – recording, mixing

== Charts ==
Chart performance for Archangel Hill
Chart (2023)	Peak position
Scottish Albums (Official Charts)	39
UK Folk Albums (Official Charts)	2
UK Independent Albums (Official Charts)	4

== See also ==
- 2023 in British music
- List of 2023 albums
