= Anthems in Eden =

Studio album by Shirley and Dolly Collins
- Released: June 1969 (UK)
- Genre: Folk
- Length: 50:30
- Label: Harvest
- Producer: Austin John Marshall

Shirley Collins chronology
| The Power of the True Love Knot (1968) | Anthems in Eden (1969) | Love, Death and the Lady (1970) |

Anthems in Eden is a 1969 album by Shirley and Dolly Collins, with the Early Music Consort of London, directed by David Munrow. The album originally consisted of a 28-minute set of folk songs plus seven other individual pieces performed by the same group. The musical arrangements for these eight pieces included early music instruments, such as viols, recorders, sackbuts and crumhorns. In 1976, six new songs were recorded with a different assortment of accompanists, to replace the original seven individual songs. This 1976 album consisting of the 28-minute set plus the six new songs was released by Harvest Records under the title Amaranth. Subsequent releases have combined all fourteen pieces under the original title, Anthems in Eden.

== Recording history ==
The original recording of eight tracks was made in 1969 and was released as the original vinyl album. Track one is a suite, "A song-story", lasting 28 minutes, 7 seconds and is the centrepiece of the album.

In 1976, a further six tracks were recorded with musicians mainly from the Albion Band and a new version of the album was released, with the original "A song-story" suite on one side and the new recordings on the other. This album was issued under the name Amaranth.

In 1993, a CD with all the tracks was issued. This whole album lasts 69:56.

== Musical content ==
Side 1 of the original album consists of "A song-story", a suite of folk songs which depict the changes in rural England brought about by the First World War, and the disconnection that this created with folk traditions. Recorded with an ensemble of early music instruments, it was a completely unique approach to recording English folk music and was to be influential on bands such as Fairport Convention and Steeleye Span in the way that they addressed the traditional folk repertoire. The importing of early instruments into popular recordings is believed to have influenced other bands such as Amazing Blondel and Gryphon.

== Musicians ==
=== Original 1969 album ===
Tracks 1 to 8: Settings by Dolly Collins, directed by David Munrow.

- Shirley Collins – vocals
- Adam Skeaping – bass viol
- Roderick Skeaping – rebec, treble and bass viol
- Oliver Brookes – bass viol
- Michael Laird – cornett
- Richard Lee – descant and treble recorder
- Alan Lumsden – sackbut
- Christopher Hogwood – harpsichord
- Dolly Collins – portative organ
- Gillian Reid – bells
- David Munrow – soprano and alto crumhorn, bass rackett, tenor sordun, treble recorder
- "The Home Brew" (Michael Clifton, Ray Worman, John Fordham), Royston Wood, Steve Ashley and John Morgan – backing vocals on "A Song Story", "Nellie The Milkmaid" and "Gower Wassail"

=== 1993 CD ===
Tracks 1 to 8 as above.

Tracks 9 to 14:

- Shirley Collins – vocals
- John Rodd – anglo-concertina
- Christopher Hogwood – virginals
- Simon Nicol – acoustic and electric guitar
- Pat Donaldson – electric bass guitar
- Dave Mattacks – regal, drums
- Roger Brenner – alto sackbut
- Colin Sheen – tenor sackbut
- Paul Beer – tenor sackbut
- Martin Nichols – bass sackbut
- John Sothcott – vielle, recorder
- John Kirkpatrick – melodeon, button accordion
- Terry Potter – mouth organ
- Ashley Hutchings – acoustic and electric bass guitar
- John Watcham – anglo-concertina
- Chorus and bells by Albion Morris Men (David Busby, Mike Clifton, Dots Daultry, Stuart Hollyer, Roger Rigden, Ada Turnham).

== Track listing ==
=== Original 1969 tracks ===
- 1- "A song-story" (A Beginning/ A Meeting/A Courtship/ A Denying/ A Forsaking/ A Dream/ A Leaving-taking/ An Awakening/ A New Beginning)

The songs are: "Searching for Lambs", "The Wedding Song", "The Blacksmith", "Our Captain Cried", "Lowlands", "Pleasant and Delightful", "Whitsun Dance", "The Staines Morris" All traditional apart from "Whitsun Dance" (words by A J Marshall)

- 2- "Rambleaway" (Traditional)
- 3- "Ca' the yowes" (Robert Burns)
- 4- "God Dog" (Robin Williamson)
- 5- "Bonny Cuckoo" (Traditional)
- 6- "Nellie the Milkmaid" (Traditional)
- 7- "Gathering Rushes in the Month of May" (Traditional)
- 8- "The Gower Wassail" (Traditional)

=== Additional tracks recorded in 1976. ===
These tracks were originally issued as side A of Aftermath, Harvest – SHSM 2008, EMI – OC 054 o 06135, with Side A of Anthems in Eden as side B.

- 9- "Fare The Well My Dearest Dear" (Traditional)
- 10- "C'Est La Fin/ Pou Mon Cuer" (Anon French 12th/13th century)
- 11- "Bonny Kate" (Traditional)
- 12- "Adieu To All Judges and Juries" (Traditional)
- 13- "Edi Beo Thu Hevene Quene" (Anon Eng 13th century)
- 14- "Black Joker/Black, White, Yellow & Green" (Traditional)
