= Austin John Marshall =

English record producer (1937–2013)

Austin John Marshall (30 March 1937 – 3 November 2013) was an English record producer, songwriter, poet and graphic designer, most notable for his work in developing folk music in Britain in the 1960s and 1970s. Writer Karl Dallas described him as "one of the great unsung pioneers of contemporary British folk song". From 1961 to 1970 he was married to English folk singer Shirley Collins.

== Biography ==
He was born in Leicester. His father, an RAF pilot, died in the Second World War, and he was educated at Christ's Hospital school in West Sussex. He studied at the Slade School of Fine Art and the London College of Printing, becoming a graphic designer whose work was published in Vogue, The Observer and elsewhere.

In 1960 he met the singer Shirley Collins when he was designing the cover for the compilation album Rocket Along, a collection of folk songs in which she was featured; they married the following year. Marshall continued to work at The Observer, and began taking an interest in traditional music. In 1964 he arranged for Collins to work with innovative guitarist Davy Graham on their joint album Folk Roots, New Routes, conceiving the album's approach and writing its liner notes. He then worked as a record producer, art director and songwriter on Collins' albums The Sweet Primeroses (1967), The Power of the True Love Knot (1968), Anthems in Eden (1969), and Love, Death and the Lady (1970), on some of which Collins sang with her sister Dolly. He also wrote lyrics for the song "Dancing At Whitsun", first published by Dallas and sung by Collins on Anthems in Eden and later covered by Tim Hart on the 1971 album Summer Solstice.

He and Collins divorced in 1970, but he continued to work both as a producer and graphic designer with other performers including the folk rock bands The Wooden O and Spirogyra, and singer-songwriter Steve Ashley. He also launched ambitious film projects, working on the film of Jimi Hendrix's Rainbow Bridge concert, where he applied feedback techniques to the video image "with results that have never been equalled"; and on the Incredible String Band's film Be Glad for the Song Has No Ending. He started a short-lived record label, Streetsong, where he recorded Bert Jansch. He also tried to launch an experimental anti-war folk musical, Smudge, reflecting on the effects of the First World War on English society. He moved to New York City in 1981, establishing himself on the Lower East Side. There, his Smudge project was eventually performed several times in the 1980s. He became a performance poet using the name John the Angel Fish, and became known for his murals.

He was married and divorced three times, and had two children. In later years he suffered from emphysema and chronic pulmonary disease. He died in New York in 2013 at the age of 76.

Writer Karl Dallas described him as "one of the great unsung pioneers of contemporary British folk song".
