= The Bold Fisherman =

English folk song

The Bold Fisherman (Roud 291, Laws O24) is an English folk song popular with traditional singers and widely collected in the early and mid 20th century CE. It has been frequently performed and recorded by contemporary folk singers and groups.

== Synopsis ==
A young woman on a river bank sees a bold fisherman rowing on the tide. She asks him how he comes to be fishing there, and he replies that he is fishing for her "sweet sake". He moors his boat and takes her by the hand. He takes off his "morning gown" (in broadside versions, her gown) and "gently lays it down" (in the broadsides, he lays her down). She sees he is wearing three gold chains, and begs him to forgive her for calling him a fisherman when "I fear you are some lord". He says she hasn't offended him, and tells her he will take her to his father's house and marry her. She will have "a bold fisherman to row you on the tide".

== Early versions ==
=== Broadsides and early printed versions ===
This song was frequently printed by broadside publishers. Examples survive from six London printers and one from Birmingham, dating from between 1813 and 1885.

=== Versions collected from traditional singers ===
The Roud Folk Song Index lists 54 versions collected from singers in Southern England and East Anglia, with two from Scotland, five or so from Canada (Nova Scotia and Newfoundland), and two or three from the USA (Maine).

== Recordings ==
=== Field recordings ===
A version from the Norfolk singer Harry Cox, probably recorded in 1950, is in the ACE online archive, and a further recording of Cox made in 1934 by E.J. Moeran is on Come Let Us Buy the Licence: Songs of Courtship & Marriage (The Voice of the People Series Vol. 1). Versions by Sussex singer George Belton, recorded in the early 1970s by Keith Summers and by Devon singer Charlie Hill, recorded in November 1985 by Bob Patten, are in the British Library Sound Archive. A version by another Norfolk singer, Sam Larner, recorded by Ewan McColl, Peggy Seeger, and Charles Parker between 1958 and 1960 is on Cruising Round Yarmouth - Sam Larner (1878-1965). The song has also been recorded by members of the Sussex Copper Family.

=== Recordings by revival singers and groups ===
A L Lloyd, The Young Tradition, Tim Hart and Maddy Prior, Shirley Collins, Andy Turner, Bow Lewis, Tim van Eyken, Rachael McShane, Jon Boden, Emily Portman, Sound Tradition, Derek Gifford, and Alex Cumming and Nicola Beazley have recorded versions of this song.

=== Published versions ===
A version of "The Bold Fisherman" is included in The New Penguin Book of English Folk Songs.

== Discussion ==
Various commentators have suggested that the song is an allegory with religious connotations. Steve Roud comments that "both the traditional and broadside versions make it pretty clear that this is a straight seduction narrative, of a maid by a higher-class man, but with a happy ending to prove his intentions were honourable and to make it romantic rather than sordid."
