= The Holly Bears the Crown =

Studio album by The Young Tradition with Shirley and Dolly Collins
- Released: 1995
- Recorded: 1969
- Label: Fledg'ling FLED 3006
- Producer: John Gilbert

The Holly Bears The Crown is an album by The Young Tradition with Shirley and Dolly Collins and other guest musicians. The trio "The Young Tradition" (Peter Bellamy, Royston Wood and Heather Wood) sang a cappella folk songs in a style similar to the Copper Family.

This album was recorded in London in 1969. A few weeks later musical and financial differences caused the break-up of The Young Tradition. Following the break-up, the record company refused to issue the album, which did not appear until 1995. By then Royston, Peter and Dolly were dead. Guest musicians Adam and Roderick Skeaping, here credited as 'The Skeapings', were members of "Musica Reservata" and had played on Shirley Collins albums. The only tracks on which everyone appears are the first song ("The Boar's Head Carol") and the last ("Bring Us in Good Ale"). Peter Bellamy later carved out a successful solo career; both Shirley and Dolly Collins also had successful careers both before and after (Shirley Collins has done more work in the folk music field than her sister).

Two tracks are Shirley and Dolly Collins without the others. These later appeared on a compilation called The Classic Collection (ostensibly by Shirley Collins) in 2004.

AllMusic described it as "a rarity -- a Christmas album you'll want to play year round," rating it four stars.

== Track listing ==
1. "Prologue from "Hamlet"" (spoken) (Shakespeare)
2. "The Boar's Head Carol" (Trad)
3. Shirley Collins and Heather Wood – "Is It Far To Bethlehem?" (Frances Chesterton/ Trad)
4. "Lullay My Liking" (Trad) (tune by Gustav Holst) From a fifteenth-century text
5. "The Cherry Tree Carol" (Trad) (tune by Shirley Collins)
6. "Shepherds Arise" (Trad) (Copper Family)
7. Shirley and Dolly Collins – "I sing of a Maiden That Is Makeless" (to "I syng of a mayden", trad., tune by Dolly Collins). From the fifteenth century Sloane MS.
8. "Interlude: the Great Frost" (spoken) (Virginia Woolf – "Orlando"). A winter scene in Jacobean London
9. The Young Tradition with Dolly Collins and the Skeapings "Tomorrow Shall Be My Dancing Day" (Trad). A shortened version of the song.
10. "A Virgin Most Pure" (Trad). A carol printed in 1822.
11. "The Coventry Carol" (Trad). A song taken from the Coventry Mystery Plays
12. "The Holly Bears the Crown" (Trad)
13. "March The Morning Sun" (Royston Wood). Written as a Carol for Saint Stephen's Day
14. "Bring Us In Good Ale" (Trad) song dated to about 1460.

== Personnel ==
- "The Young Tradition" consisting of Peter Bellamy, Heather Wood and Royston Wood – vocals
- Shirley Collins – vocals
- Dolly Collins – pipe organ
- Adam Skeaping – bass viol
- Roderick Skeaping – recorder
- Narrations by Gary Watson
- Instrumental arrangements by Dolly Collins
