= Folk Review =

Defunct British folk music magazine

Folk Review (known as Folk & Country for its first four issues) was a British magazine dedicated to folk music, founded and edited by Fred Woods until its final two issues - which were edited by Bill Caddick. The magazine appeared monthly in the UK, with 91 consecutive monthly issues from November 1971 to May 1979.

Its content was designed to represent, and appeal to, the interests of the regular audiences of the folk-clubs movement which flourished nationally during the period of the second British Folk Revival, so both traditional and "contemporary" folk music were covered in its features and its concert and record reviews. The proportion to which these two strands should be represented was often a topic of some controversy within its feature and correspondence pages.

A regular, and popular, feature was the opinion and general musings column which occupied the last page. This became known generally as the 'tailpiece', as its first series was written by Eric Winter, editor of Folk Review's contemporary magazine, Sing, published by the Workers Music Association, punningly entitled "Winter's Tailpiece". When Winter withdrew from this monthly commitment, he was replaced, from September 1973 until April 1976, by Michael Grosvenor Myer, whose column appeared under the title "Taking the Mike".

In addition, several songs, with their music, would appear in every issue.

Among other folk journalists and musicians who contributed regularly as critics, columnists and song writers may be mentioned Karl Dallas, Peter Bellamy, Russell Wortley, Tony Rose, Dick Gaughan, John Paddy Browne, Derek Schofield, Ian A. Anderson, Roly Brown, Barrie Roberts, Roy Harris, Harvey Andrews, Jon Raven, Roy Palmer, Rosie Hardman, Stan Hugill, Paul Weir.
