= Plant Life Records =

Record label

- Founded: 1977
- Founder: Nigel Pegrum
- Defunct: 1984
- Status: Defunct
- Country of origin: United Kingdom

Plant Life Records was a record label that existed from 1977 until 1984. It was formed by Nigel Pegrum, at that time drummer for Steeleye Span. Maddy Prior recorded one album for the label, as did Wizz Jones in 1977. Its most successful recordings were by The Tannahill Weavers and Blowzabella. Most of the thirty or so albums were produced by Pegrum and seven were produced by Paul James. Late in its life, the label began issuing records under licence from other labels and was linked to the Burlington record label, which was also issued with the Plant Life logo on the later labels.

== Discography ==
Year	Artist	Title	Catalogue number
1976	The Tannahill Weavers	Are Ye Sleeping Maggie	PLR 001
	Noel Murphy	Performs	PLR 002
1977	Johnny Silvo	Time Enough To Spare	PLR 003
	Jon Betmead	A Vision of Heaven	PLR 004
	Alex Atterson	Pushing the Business On	PLR 005
	Peasants All	A Handful of Pleasant Ditties	PLR 008
	Wizz Jones	Magical Flight	PLR009
1978	The Tannahill Weavers	The Old Woman's Dance	PLR010
	Alan Roberts & Dougie MacLean	Caledonia	PLR 012
	Rosemary Hardman	Eagle Over Blue Mountain	PLR014
1979	The Tannahill Weavers	The Tannahill Weavers	PLR017
	Cambridge City Jassband	Cambridge Blues	PLJ004
	Hot Vultures	Up the Line	PLR 018
	The Chester Recorders	The Chester Recorders	PLR 019
	Celebrated Ratliffe Stout Band	Behind the Mask	PLR 020
	Holly Tannen & Pete Cooper	Frosty Morning	
1980	Dougie MacLean	Snaigow	PLR 022
	Peasants All	Broadside On	PLR 024
	Peter Harrison	Salley in Our Alley	PLR025
	Jester	Kemp's Jig	PLR 026
	Rosemary Hardman	Stopped in My Tracks	PLR 023
1981	The Tannahill Weavers	Tannahill Weavers IV	PLR028
	Celebrated Ratliffe Stout Band	Vanlag	PLR 030
	Shusha, Maddy Prior, Melanie Harrold, John Kirkpatrick, Robert Johnson & Sydney Carter	Lovely in the Dances: The Songs of Sydney Carter	PLR032
1982	Skyboat	Ship in Distress	PLR035
	The Maddy Prior Band	Hooked on Winning	PLR 036
	Blowzabella	Blowzabella	PLR 038
	Heritage[UK]	Living By the Air	PLR040
	Philip Astle, Paul Williamson & Paul Hillier	Miri It Is: English Medieval Music From the 13th and 14th Centuries	PLR043
	Steve Womack	Northern Comfort	PLR044
	Bucca	An tol yn pen an telynyor (The Hole in the Harper's Head)	
1983	Robyn Archer	Take Your Partners for the Ladies Choice	PLR 045
	Cantabile	Town & Gown: The Humours of Bath and Cambridge	PLR047
	Rosemary Hardman	The Weakness of Eve	PLR 053
	Six Hands in Tempo	Desperate Digits	PLR054
	Nigel Pickles	The Mexborough English Concertina Prize Band	PLR 055
	Peter Please	Uffington	PLR060
	Tansey's Fancy	Tansey's Fancy	PLR065
	Les Penning	Willow Fair / Baskerville Down	PLRS 003
	Les Penning	Should Have Been Forever / Merlin's Welcome Home	PLRS 04
1984	Donald Swann	Requiem for the Living	PLR061
	Julie Mairs	Give Me a Sign	PLR062
	Frankie Armstrong, Brian Pearson, Blowzabella, Jon Gillaspie	Tam Lin	PLR063
	Blowzabella	Bobbityshooty	PLR 064
	Flash Company Inc.	Castle Keep	PLR 067
	Mara!	Images	PLR 070
1985	Graham & Eileen Pratt	Hieroglyphics	PLR068
	Nigel Pickles	The New Mexborough English Concertina Quartet	PLR 071
1987	Robin Williamson	Winter's Turning	PLR 075
1988	Roger Watson & Debbie McClatchy	Radioland	PLC079
	Robin Williamson	Ten of Songs	PLCD 081
	Blowzabella	A Richer Dust	PLR 080
	Pat Halcox	Seventh Avenue	PLJ 002
	Cantabile	Overture	PLR 027
	Cambridge Silver Jubilee Youth Choir	A Song for All Seasons	PLR031
	London Pro Musica	Italian Renaissance Music	PLR066

== See also ==
- Lists of record labels
