= Organino =

Organino indicates a small organ. In particular it can refer to:

- Portative organ
- A free-reed instrument designed by Filippo Testa in 1700, ancestor of the reed organ
