= Love, Death and the Lady =

Studio album by Shirley and Dolly Collins
- Released: 1970
- Recorded: 1970
- Genre: Folk rock
- Label: Harvest
- Producer: Austin John Marshall

Shirley Collins chronology
Anthems in Eden (1969)	Love, Death and the Lady (1970)	No Roses (with The Albion Country Band) (1971)

Love, Death and the Lady is an album by Shirley and Dolly Collins.

This is a companion-piece to Anthems In Eden (1969), but with a darker tone to it. She attributes the 'melancholy' mood of the album to her own personal loneliness at that time. Many of the instrumentalists of Anthems In Eden are present ('Musica Reservata'), but they contributed sparser accompaniments. The figure of Death appears as a character in the title track. "The Oxford Girl", sung unaccompanied, is about an apparently motiveless murder of a woman by her erstwhile lover. The long instrumental sections which were such a feature of Anthems In Eden, are absent, apart from the start and end of "Plains of Waterloo". The male chorus is present on only one track, "The Bold Fisherman". The thematic unity of the album centres on murder, class conflict and betrayal. "The Outlandish Knight" concerns a serial killer. The album was produced by Austin John Marshall, Shirley's husband at the time. Rejected love plays a part in some songs, and this might echo the fact that Shirley and Austin were on the verge of divorcing each other.

Arrangements are provided by Dolly Collins (Shirley's sister), who plays flute-organ and piano, and gives a minor key accompaniment to some songs. It is almost as if the singer and the instrumentalists are in different worlds. On the tracks which have harpsichord accompaniment (Christopher Hogwood), the contrast lies in the intricacy of the instrumental line, compared to the straightforward vocal presentation of tragic events.

The most cheerful of the songs is "Fair Maid of Islington", where a female fruit seller gets the better of a treacherous vintner. It is sung to the dance tune of Sellenger's Round. It was the only one of the songs which found its way into the repertoire of Ashley Hutchings' and Shirley Collins' Albion Country Band, as testified by performances in 1976. Terry Cox, who was a member of Pentangle at this time, plays understated percussion on three songs.

The last four tracks were recorded at the original studio sessions, but were excluded by reasons of time constraints on long-playing records. The album was chosen as "Folk Album of the Month" by Melody Maker, and was short-listed for album of the year. Shirley comments, "It wasn't easy music to listen to, I'm surprised anybody bought any of it at all".

The album, which was recorded in 1970, has a running time 65 minutes 21 seconds (including the bonus tracks).

== Track listing ==
All tracks are traditional.

1. "Death and the Lady"
2. "Glenlogie"
3. "The Oxford Girl"
4. "Are You Going to Leave Me?"
5. "The Outlandish Knight"
6. "Go From My Window" (Traditional; arranged Collins and Wood)
7. "Young Girl Cut Down in Her Prime"
8. "Geordie"
9. "Salisbury Plain"
10. "Fair Maid of Islington"
11. "Six Dukes"
12. "Polly on the Shore" (Traditional; arranged Collins and Wood)
13. "Plains of Waterloo"
14. "Sailor from Dover" (*)
15. "Young John" (*) (Traditional; arranged Shirley and Dolly Collins)
16. "Short Jacket and White Trousers" (*)
17. "The Bold Fisherman" (*) (Traditional; arranged Bob Copper)

(* Bonus tracks not available on the original LP. They were recorded during the original studio sessions)

== Personnel ==
Personnel according to Mainly Norfolk: English Folk and Other Good Music

- Shirley Collins – vocals
- Christopher Hogwood – harpsichord
- Alan Lumsden – sackbut
- Adam Skeaping – bass viol, violone
- Roderick Skeaping – bass viol
- Eleanor Sloan – rebec
- John Fordham – recorder
- Dolly Collins – flute-organ and piano, arrangements
- David Munrow – additional arrangements
- Terry Cox – percussion (7,8,13)
- Peter Wood – concertina (6,12)
- Uncredited male chorus on 17 includes John Fordham and Peter Wood
