= Heart's Ease (album) =

Studio album by Shirley Collins
- Released: July 24, 2020
- Studios: Metway Studios (Brighton, England)
- Genre: Folk
- Length: 43:16
- Label: Domino
- Producer: Ian Kearey

Shirley Collins chronology
Lodestar (2016)	Heart's Ease (2020)	Archangel Hill (2023)

Heart's Ease is the eighth solo studio album by English folk singer Shirley Collins. It was released on 24 July 2020 via Domino Recording Company, a follow-up to her 2016 comeback album Lodestar. Recording sessions took place at Metway Studios in Brighton. Produced by Ian Kearey, the album features contributions from Dave Arthur, Matthew Shaw, Nathan Salsburg, Ossian Brown, Pete Cooper, Pip Barnes, John Watcham and Glen Redman.

== Critical reception ==
Professional ratings
Aggregate scores
Source	Rating
AnyDecentMusic?	8.2/10
Metacritic	86/100
Review scores
Source	Rating
AllMusic	4/5 stars
The Arts Desk	4/5 stars
Beats per Minute	78%/100%
CLASH	8/10
The Guardian	4/5 stars
Loud and Quiet	9/10
MusicOMH	4.5/5 stars
The Observer	5/5 stars
Record Collector	4/5 stars
Uncut	9/10

Heart's Ease was met with generally favorable reviews from critics. At Metacritic, which assigns a weighted average rating out of 100 to reviews from mainstream publications, this release received an average score of 86, based on fourteen reviews. The aggregator AnyDecentMusic? has the critical consensus of the album at an 8.2 out of 10, based on sixteen reviews. The aggregator Album of the Year assessed the critical consensus as 84 out of 100, based on sixteen reviews.

Writing for The Observer, Neil Spencer praised the album stating that "Heart's Ease proves a more confident follow-up". Ben Hogwood of musicOMH said, "The voice of Shirley Collins is blossoming again, delivering its compelling stories with the urgency of a singer who simply had to make this record. Collins is a musical key worker, her songs compelling at every turn". Uncut critic Tom Pinnock considered, "It's as touching, beautiful and dark as any of Collins' records, and even pushes her sound into new territories. 65 years into her recording career, that modern approach to folk music is still yielding treasures". Loud and Quiet writer Fergal Kinney said, "it goes some way further towards entrenching her unique position in British culture". AllMusic's Mark Deming said, "Heart's Ease goes further, revealing she's still a vital performer and an artist willing to explore new and unfamiliar territory, suggesting a more interesting future than listeners might have imagined". Robin Murray of Clash said, "It's a real banquet, a feat of folk re-contextualisation driven forward by the sharp emotional instincts of its formidable maker". Mike Goldsmith of Record Collector said, "Heart's Ease is ample evidence that Shirley Collins still has the ambition, passion and guts to not only document where folk has come from but where it's going. A lodestar, indeed". The Guardian critic Jude Rogers stated, "Collins' past, present and future come together to form a fascinating picture of her full, complex character". The Arts Desk's Kieron Tyler said, "Heart's Ease ends surprisingly, with the foremost exponent of England's vocal folk tradition". Emma Bauchner of Beats per Minute said, "Heart's Ease captures the Shirley Collins of the present day, and is in no way an attempt to recreate times passed. And yet the continuity is crystal clear: Collins' devotion to the folk tradition is as strong as ever. She continues to bring new life to the musical artefact that is the folk song, and the fact that she brings so many years of her own to these interpretations makes them feel all the more authentic".

== Track listing ==
No.	Title	Length
1.	"The Merry Golden Tree"	4:08
2.	"Rolling in the Dew"	3:52
3.	"The Christmas Song"	2:00
4.	"Locked in Ice"	4:47
5.	"Wondrous Love"	2:21
6.	"Barbara Allen"	4:14
7.	"Canadee-i-o"	4:13
8.	"Sweet Greens and Blues"	5:28
9.	"Tell Me True"	2:56
10.	"Whitsun Dance"	3:07
11.	"Orange in Bloom"	1:36
12.	"Crowlink"	4:29
Total length:		43:16

== Personnel ==
- Shirley Collins – vocals
- Ian Kearey – bass (tracks: 1, 4, 6, 10), 12-string guitar (tracks: 1, 3, 8), angel guitars (tracks: 1, 7), soprano ukulele (track 1), mandolin (tracks: 4, 5, 9), electric guitar (track 4), percussion (track 4), bottleneck guitar (track 5), 12-string dobro (track 6), lap slide guitar (tracks: 8, 11), guitar (track 9), low guitar (track 10), producer
- Dave Arthur – banjo & spoons (track 2), harmonica (track 10), melodeon (track 11)
- Pip Barnes – guitar (tracks: 2, 7, 10, 11)
- Pete Cooper – fiddle (tracks: 2, 8, 10, 11)
- Ossian Brown – hurdy-gurdy (tracks: 6, 12)
- Nathan Salsburg – guitar (track 8)
- John Watcham – concertina (track 11)
- Glen Redman – dance (track 11)
- Matthew Shaw – electric piano, field recording, harmonium & Moog Prodigy (track 12)
- Al Scott – mixing

== Charts ==
Chart (2020)	Peak position
Scottish Albums (Official Charts)	58
UK Folk Albums (Official Charts)	8
UK Independent Albums (Official Charts)	9
UK Vinyl Albums (OCC)	19
