= The Power of the True Love Knot =

Studio album by Shirley Collins
- Released: 1968
- Recorded: 1968
- Length: 39:58
- Label: Polydor
- Producer: Joe Boyd

Shirley Collins chronology
The Sweet Primeroses (1967)	The Power of the True Love Knot (1968)	Anthems in Eden (with Dolly Collins) (1969)

The Power of the True Love Knot is an album by Shirley Collins.

The theme of this collection of songs is "the idea of true love as a power outside society's control", as Shirley writes on the liner notes. If the first track sounds slightly like "Eleanor Rigby", this is because Bram Taylor plays cello on both of them. Two other guests are Mike Heron and Robin Williamson from The Incredible String Band. The relationship bore fruit on Shirley's next album. Anthems in Eden (1969) contains "God Dog", a song written by Robin Williamson.

The title of this album comes from the song "Lady Margaret and Sweet William". On this song, Shirley accompanies herself on 5-string dulcimer, adapted to have a banjo neck, an instrument she only ever used on this album. Three of the songs on this collection had previously been recorded on False True Lovers (1960) – "Just as the Tide Was Flowing", "Richie Story" and "The Unquiet Grave". Dolly Collins puts her stamp on "Richie Story" in her pipe organ accompaniment, a stately march as the couple in the song progress through the street to church to marry.

In 1964, Shirley had recorded Folk Roots, New Routes, which introduced eastern rhythms to English folk song. On this album, there is a vaguely Indian flavour to "Seven Yellow Gipsies" with Robin Williamson's complicated clapping, and his chanter playing on the song "The Maydens Came".

== Track listing ==
The references after the titles below are from the three major numbering schemes for traditional folk songs, the Roud Folk Song Index, Child Ballad Numbers and the Laws Numbers.

No.	Title	Length
1.	"Bonnie Boy" (Roud 293)	3:45
2.	"Richie Story" (Roud 97; Child 232)	4:18
3.	"Lovely Joan" (Roud 592)	2:31
4.	"Just as the Tide Was Flowing" (Roud 1105)	1:40
5.	"The Unquiet Grave" (Roud 51; Child 78)	3:27
6.	"Black-eyed Susan" (Roud 560; Laws O28)	3:36
7.	"Seven Yellow Gipsies" (Roud 1; Child 200)	1:48
8.	"Over the Hills and Far Away" (Roud 8460)	2:28
9.	"Greenwood Laddie" (Roud 2123)	1:45
10.	"Lady Margaret and Sweet William" (Roud 253; Child 74)	5:11
11.	"The Maydens Came"	2:00
12.	"Polly Vaughan" (Roud 166; Laws O36)	2:50
13.	"The Barley Straw" (Roud 19112)	3:52
14.	"Barbara Allen" (Roud 54; Child 84)	3:27
Total length:		39:58

== Personnel ==
- Shirley Collins – vocal, 5-string dulcimer (1,5,8,10,12)
- Dolly Collins – pipe organ (1–4,6,8–9,11,13–14)
- Bram Taylor – cello (1,9)
- Mike Heron – finger cymbals (2), African drum (2), clapping (7)
- Robin Williamson – Japanese sticks (2), tin whistle (2), chanter from Indian Shahanhai (11), clapping (7)
