= Folk Roots, New Routes =

Studio album by Shirley Collins and Davy Graham
- Released: 1964
- Recorded: Camden, London, 1964
- Genre: Folk; folk jazz; folk blues
- Length: 49:22
- Language: English
- Label: Decca
- Producer: Ray Horricks

Folk Roots, New Routes is a collaborative folk album by Shirley Collins and Davy Graham, released by Decca in 1964.

The album was produced by Ray Horricks and recorded by Gus Dudgeon; the sleeve featured a photograph by Crispian Woodgate and sleeve notes by Austin John Marshall.

According to Bob Stanley, the album took inspiration from the North African scale, modal music and Miles Davis; it was the first time many of these English folk songs had been recorded with guitar backing.

== Track listing ==
All tracks are written by Trad. arr. Collins, Graham, except where noted.

Side 1
No.	Title	Length
1.	"Nottamun Town" (Trad. arr. Sharp)	3:38
2.	"Proud Maisrie" (Trad. arr. MacColl)	3:58
3.	"The Cherry Tree Carol" (trad. arr. Collins)	3:13
4.	"Blue Monk" (Thelonious Monk)	2:59
5.	"Hares on the Mountain"	2:52
6.	"Reynardine" (Trad. arr. Hughes)	2:24
7.	"Pretty Saro"	4:11
8.	"Rif Mountain" (Graham)	2:19
Total length:		25:34

Side 2
No.	Title	Length
1.	"Jane, Jane" (Trad. arr Seeger)	2:35
2.	"Love Is Pleasin'"	2:27
3.	"Boll Weevil, Holler" (arr. Lomax)	2:53
4.	"Hori Horo" (Trad. arr Kennedy-Fraser)	2:07
5.	"Bad Girl"	2:36
6.	"Lord Gregory"	3:30
7.	"Grooveyard" (Timmons)	2:56
8.	"Dearest Dear" (Trad. arr. Sharp)	2:59
Total length:		23:48

== Personnel ==
- Shirley Collins: vocals; five-string banjo ("The Cherry Tree Carol")
- Davy Graham: guitar

== Reception ==
Folk Roots, New Routes is regarded as a landmark album of the folk revival; Jude Rogers writing for NPR called it "an uncompromising work that spearheaded innovation in the middle of the folk music revival. It set a template for the folk-rock that followed it, and inspired 21st century psych-folk decades later." It is described as a template for Fairport Convention's Liege & Lief (1969).
