= Hooked on Winning =

Hooked on Winning is a 1982 album by the Maddy Prior band.

Subsequent to its original release on vinyl on Kempire Records KMPA001 and then Plant Life, the album was unavailable for many years, until its 2011 re-release on CD on the Park Records label as part of a two album set with follow-up Going for Glory.

== Track listing ==
1. Long Holiday [3:45] (Rick Kemp)
2. Information Station [3:45] (Maddy Prior)
3. Face To Face [4:09] (Maddy Prior)
4. Roll On The Day [4:24] (Rick Kemp)
5. Back Into Cabaret [3:18] (Rick Kemp)
6. Commit The Crime [3:35] (Maddy Prior)
7. Friends [4:18] (Rick Kemp)
8. Reduced Circumstances [4:05] (Maddy Prior)
9. Nothing But The Best [3:50] (Rick Kemp)
10. Love's Not Just A Word [3:32] (Rick Kemp)
11. Girls On The Town [4:03] (Maddy Prior / John o'Connor)
12. Anthem To Failure [3:45] (Maddy Prior)

== Personnel ==
- Maddy Prior - vocals
- Richie Close - keyboards
- Mick Dyche - guitar and vocals
- Gary Wilson - drums and vocals
- Rick Kemp - bass and vocals
