= Lodestar (album) =

Studio album by Shirley Collins
- Released: 4 November 2016
- Recorded: 2015
- Genre: Folk music
- Length: 42:56
- Label: Domino
- Producer: Ian Kearey

Shirley Collins chronology
For as Many as Will (with Dolly Collins) (1978)	Lodestar (2016)	Heart's Ease (2020)

Lodestar is the seventh studio album by the English folk musician Shirley Collins. The album is Collins's first in 38 years, making it one of the longest gaps between studio albums.

== Background ==
After being one of the most significant figures in the English Folk Revival of the 1960s, Collins withdrew from music in the late 1970s when she developed dysphonia, attributed to being left by her second husband, Ashley Hutchings. In 2014 she was coaxed back into performance by Current 93's David Tibet for a concert at Union Chapel in North London. Following this performance, Collins started making a new album at her house in Lewes, recorded by Stephen Thrower and Ossian Brown of the group Cyclobe. Some of the album's recording was filmed, and included in the documentary The Ballad of Shirley Collins.

== Critical reception ==
Professional ratings
Aggregate scores
Source	Rating
Metacritic	82/100
Review scores
Source	Rating
AllMusic	3.5/5 stars
Clash	8/10
Exclaim!	8/10
musicOMH	4.5/5 stars
Pitchfork	8/10
Record Collector	4/5 stars
The Guardian	3/5 stars
The Irish Times	4/5 stars
The Observer	4/5 stars

Lodestar was met with universal acclaim from music critics. At Metacritic, which assigns a normalized rating out of 100 to reviews from mainstream publications, the album received an average score of 82, based on fifteen reviews.

Daniel Paton of musicOMH praised the album, saying: "whether stark and menacing, grief-laden or simply plain daft, Lodestar is a triumph of storytelling and sound". AllMusic's Mark Deming resumed: "the album isn't a comeback but a continuum, and a welcome return from a true oracle of traditional song". Patrick Clarke of Clash wrote: "she embraces their words, often of death and reminiscence on youth, as if they'd come from deep within herself. It is, after 38 years, a fine reminder of her vital place in British musical tradition, as the essential elder stateswoman of folk". Emily Zimmerman of Exclaim! stated that "Lodestar is true to Collins' roots". Louis Pattison of Pitchfork concluded: "that Lodestar exists at all feels like a minor miracle. That it is so exquisitely done is a small blessing on top". Mike Goldsmith of Record Collector wrote: "the music exceeds expectation and while this understandably isn't her best album, it looks at the current trend for reformations and reduces them to ash". Neil Spencer of The Observer wrote: "the mood is austere, studded by encounters with mortality, but the accompaniments from Oysterband's Ian Kearey are full of subtlety and surprise, with delicate guitars and blasts of squeezebox. A late-flowering triumph".

In a mixed review, Alexis Petridis of The Guardian wrote: "this should all be heavier going than it is: that it isn't is at least partly down to the arrangements, which are largely based around acoustic guitar and subtly effective throughout. Moreover, they fit Collins' voice, which has weathered considerably in the years she kept silent. But the new patina suits her, and the material".

=== Accolades ===
Publication	Accolade	Year	Rank	Ref.
The Quietus	Albums of the Year 2016	2016	5	
The Wire	Top 50 Releases of 2016	2016	2	

== Track listing ==
No.	Title	Writer(s)	Length
1.	"Awake Awake / The Split Ash Tree / May Carol / Southover"	Trad./Ossian Brown/Shirley Collins/Glen Redman	11:09
2.	"The Banks of Green Willow"	Trad.	3:18
3.	"Cruel Lincoln"	Trad.	3:30
4.	"Washed Ashore"	Trad.	2:57
5.	"Death and the Lady"	Shirley Collins	4:45
6.	"Pretty Polly"	Trad.	4:17
7.	"Old Johnny Buckle"	Trad.	1:43
8.	"Sur le Borde de l'Eau"	Trad.	3:53
9.	"The Rich Irish Lady / Jeff Sturgeon"	Trad.	5:58
10.	"The Silver Swan"	Orlando Gibbons	1:26
Total length:			42:56

== Charts ==
Chart (2016)	Peak position
Scottish Albums (Official Charts)	97
UK Albums (Official Charts)	88
UK Independent Albums (Official Charts)	13
