= The Young Tradition =

English musical group

- Origin: England
- Genres: Folk
- Years active: 1965–1969
- Label: Transatlantic
- Past members: Peter Bellamy; Heather Wood; Royston Wood

The Young Tradition was an English folk group of the 1960s, formed by Peter Bellamy, Royston Wood and Heather Wood. They recorded three albums of mainly traditional British folk music, sung in arrangements for their three unaccompanied voices.

== Biography ==
The Young Tradition was formed on 18 April 1965 by Peter Bellamy (born Peter Franklyn Bellamy, 8 September 1944, Bournemouth, Dorset, England – 19 September 1991, Keighley, Yorkshire, England), Royston Wood (born Royston Michael Wood, 1935 – 8 April 1990, New Rochelle, New York, U.S.) and Heather Wood (born Arielle Heather Wood, 31 March 1945, Attercliffe, Sheffield, Yorkshire, England – 15 July 2024, Stony Brook, New York) (who was unrelated to Royston Wood). Most of their repertoire was traditional British folk music, sung without instrumental accompaniment, and was drawn especially from the music of the Copper Family from Sussex, who had a strong oral musical tradition. They augmented the pure folk music with some composed songs which were strongly rooted in the English folk tradition, such as sea shanties written by Cyril Tawney, of which "Chicken on a Raft" was the most notable.

In the late 1960s, London became the centre of the English folk music revival and The Young Tradition moved there, sharing a house with John Renbourn, Bert Jansch and Anne Briggs.

They recorded three albums as well as an EP on the Transatlantic Records label. Allegedly, the group also had an uncredited cameo appearance singing the Marat, We're Poor chorus on Judy Collins' 1966 In My Life album. They also collaborated with Shirley Collins on an album recorded in 1969 called The Holly Bears the Crown. A single of The Boar's Head Carol was released from these sessions in 1974 (by Argo Records), but owing in part to the band's 1969 break up, the full album was not released until 1995 (by Fledg'ling Records). Transatlantic also released a compilation record in 1969: The Young Tradition Sampler.

Their later work became more influenced by mediaeval music. "Galleries", their last album released during the life of the band, was musically augmented by Dolly Collins, Dave Swarbrick, David Munrow and The Early Music Consort. It included a version of "Agincourt Carol".

In 1969, the group split up on account of their different musical preferences, with Bellamy wanting to pursue pure traditional music. Their final concert was at Cecil Sharp House, home of the English Folk Dance and Song Society, in October 1969.

Royston Wood and Heather Wood continued to work together after the split with Peter Bellamy in 1969, but they did not record again until 1977 when they released No Relation, an album which included Peter Bellamy as guest singer on three tracks and also appearances by guitarists Pete Kirtley and Simon Nicol and bass guitarist Ashley Hutchings.

In 1972 Royston Wood joined The Albion Country Band on vocals and English concertina, with ex-Fairport Convention members Ashley Hutchings, Simon Nicol and Dave Mattacks, along with fiddler, Sue Draheim and singer-songwriter, Steve Ashley. Following the break-up of this band he sang briefly with Swan Arcade and died after a car accident in 1990, and Peter Bellamy died by suicide in 1991.

The last recording to be found under the name "The Young Tradition: Oberlin '68," was a 2013 release of a live concert performed for the Oberlin College folk music society, recorded unbeknownst (or possibly just unremembered) to the trio, rediscovered by the recording engineer among his old reel-to-reels, and deemed by English label Fledg'ling to be worthy of distribution. The album shows the band at their stand-up performing best, with the jokes and introductions to the songs providing a clear picture of their performing style while they were in their heyday.

Heather Wood became a mainstay of the New York and East Coast folk scenes, as sometimes Treasurer, and sometimes Program Chair of the Folk Music Society of New York, Inc. (formerly the Pinewoods Folk Music Club), and co-founded with Joy Bennett (The Johnson Girls, Executive Director of Old Songs) the club's week-long annual folk music camp TradMaD, held at Pinewoods Camp in Plymouth, Massachusetts each summer. As well as organizing traditional music events and performances, she wrote serious and funny songs, and poems, and seasonal plays, and she performed frequently as a solo artist as well as in a duo known as Crossover with Andy Wallace, an American traditional singer (1984 - 1986); in trios including Poor Old Horse with David Jones (English) and Tom Gibney (American) (1992 - 2005); and as TradMore with David Kleiman and Ken Schatz, two American blokes). She was determined to keep traditional English music alive, and in her later years influenced many unaccompanied folksingers who she dubbed collectively as "the young," a number of whom sang her to her rest at Stony Brook University Hospital, where she died. Heather Wood lived in New York City from 1977 until her death on 15 July 2024, at the age of 79.

== Discography ==
- The Young Tradition - 1966
- So Cheerfully Round - 1966
- Chicken on a Raft - 1968 (EP)
- Galleries - 1969
- The Young Tradition Sampler - 1969
- Galleries Revisited - 1973 (Reissue of Galleries with additional sleeve notes by Heather Wood)
- The Holly Bears the Crown - recorded 1969, released 1995
- Royston Wood & Heather Wood - No Relation - 1977
- Galleries/No Relation - 1997 (Reissue of Galleries and the EP with additional tracks by Royston & Heather Wood on a single CD)
- The Young Tradition/So Cheerfully Round- 1999 (Reissue of first 2 albums on a single CD)
- Oberlin 1968 - 2013 release of a live performance at Oberlin College, Oberlin, Ohio, United States, on 17 November 1968. Fledg'ling FLED3094

== Bibliography ==
- Bob Copper, A Song for Every Season: 100 Years in the Life of a Sussex Farming Family, Heinemann, 1971. ISBN 0-434-14455-X
