= Rosie Hardman =

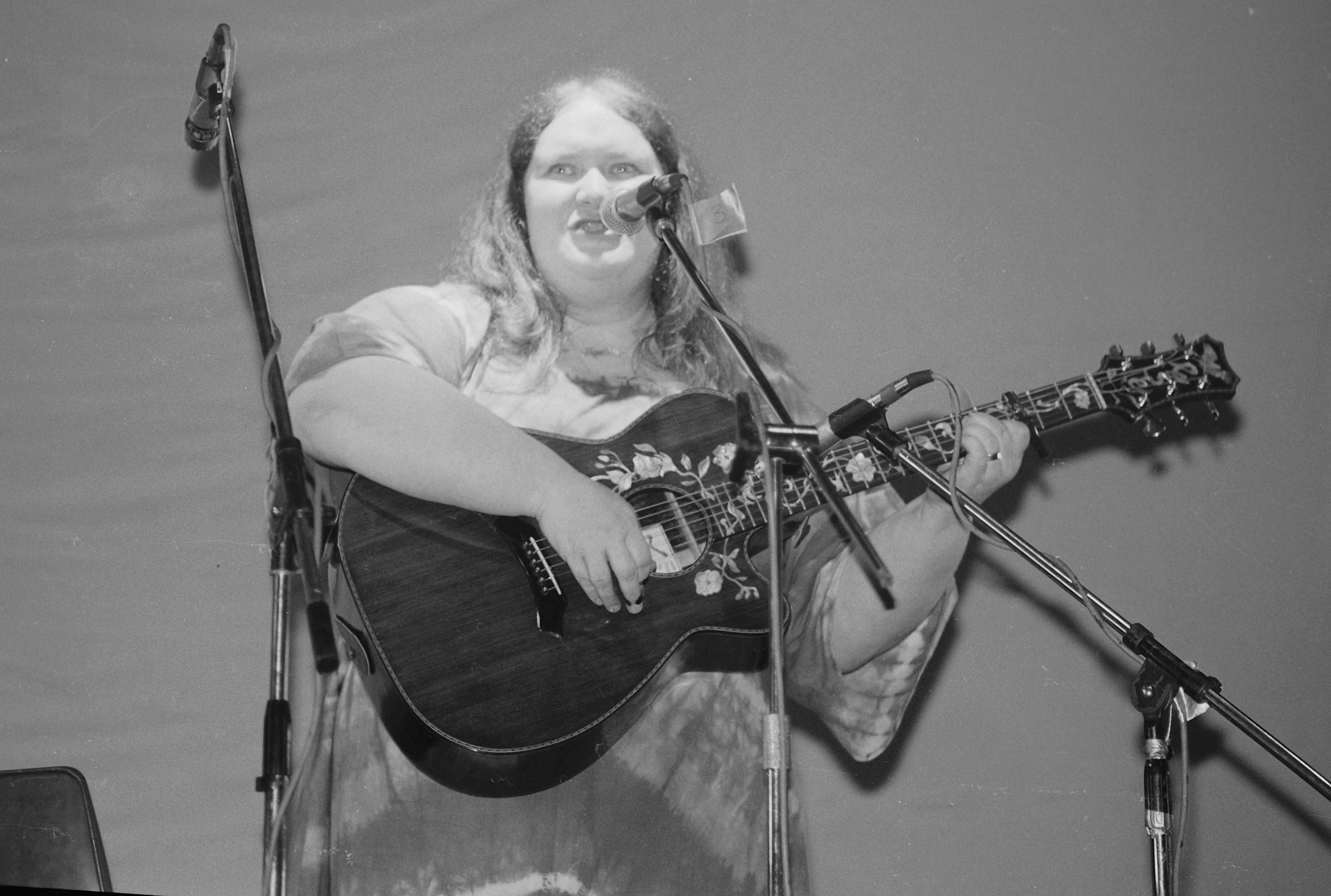

Background information
- Born: Rosemary Hardman; 26 February 1945; Manchester, England
- Died: 23 October 2026 (aged 81) Urmston, England
- Genres: Folk, soft rock
- Occupation: Singer-songwriter
- Instruments: Vocals, guitar
- Years active: 1968–present
- Labels: Trailer Records; Plant Life Records

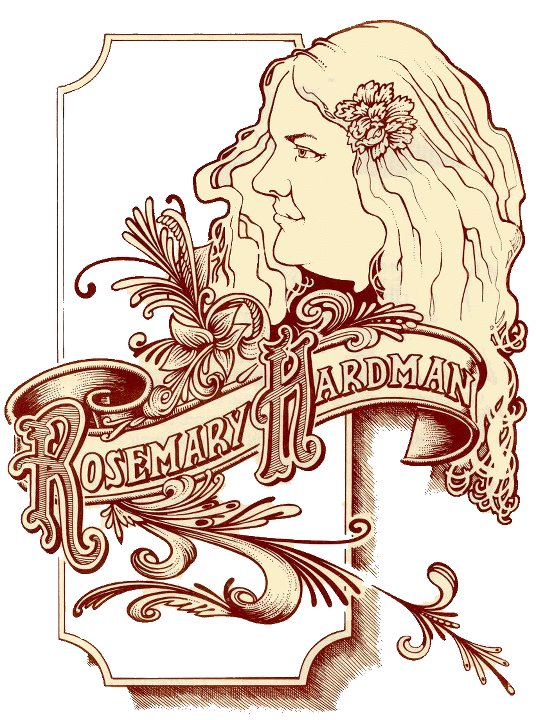
Rosie Hardman - Artistic illustration

Rosemary "Rosie" Hardman (26 February 1945 - 23 October 2026) was a British folk singer-songwriter, musician and performer, best known for such recordings as Lady For Today, Pride of the River, Song to the Evening Sky, and Tongue Tied. Hardman was one of the mainstays of the Manchester folk scene in the 1960s, and performed extensively in both the UK and internationally until 1991.

== Career ==
=== Early life ===
Rosemary Hardman was born in and grew up in Manchester, England. She was educated at the nearby Urmston Grammar School for Girls. Before turning professional as a singer in 1968, she worked at a variety of jobs in her early career, including as a horse riding instructor, assistant in a bookstore, hairdresser, and secretary for the MSG artiste booking agency. She began writing songs at the age of 13 and made her first folk club appearance in 1965, at the Manchester Sports Guild. Over the next three years, she established herself as resident singer and organiser of a number of folk clubs.

=== 1960s: Early years ===
After three years of playing amateur and semi-professional gigs on the folk scene, Hardman turned professional in December 1968. That month she released her first album, Queen of Hearts, on the Folk Heritage label. It contained a mixture of traditional and contemporary material. The album was recorded live on 29 December 1968 at the Bate Hall Hotel, Macclesfield, Cheshire, UK. Six months later she teamed up with south London guitarist Bob Axford, and they performed mainly original material.

=== 1970s: Success ===
Rosie Hardman and Bob Axford released a joint album, Second Season Came(1970), on the Trailer Records label. This album included her most popular and covered song "Lady for Today". They released a second album together (her third) Firebird in 1971, also on the Trailer Records label.

In 1971 Hardman married Rob Ixer on 17 April. Many of their friends from the music scene attended. Her matron of honour was Toni Arthur (a folk singer who later became known on children's TV). For their informal evening reception, they gathered at the Manchester Sports Guild, where Hardman had been a compere and guest artist. That night the hall had already booked Barbara Dickson.

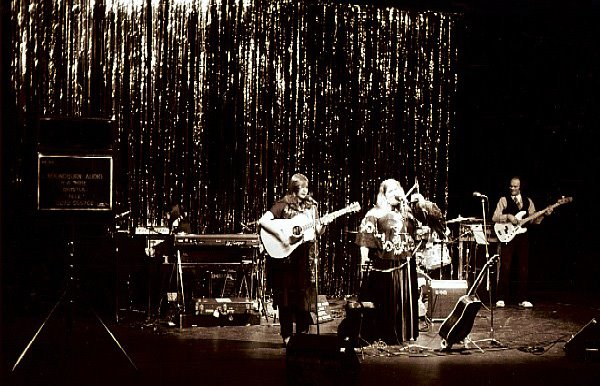
Rosie Hardman and the Rosie Hardman Band at Aston University in 1980

In the early/mid 1970s, Hardman toured with singer/songwriter Andy Caven as her road manager/sound engineer. They recorded a version of her song "Fiddler Man" together before Caven followed his independent career.

In 1974, Hardman played the Cambridge Folk Festival and in 1975 she released her next album, Jerseyburger and also a cassette of a live recording – For My Part. In 1978, Hardman signed to the Plant Life label, with which she made three albums (see Discography). The backing musicians on these recordings included Dave Cousins, Maddy Prior, Nigel Pegrum, Rick Kemp, Brian Willoughby, Jon Gillaspie, Mike Silver and B. J. Cole.

In 1977 she performed a series of gigs with Bristol-based guitarist Steve Payne. From 1979, she toured briefly with a band which comprised Nigel Pegrum (drums), Jon Gillaspie (Keyboards), Pat Tate (guitar/vocals) and Rick Kemp (bass). This tour was notable for its finale, in which an eagle (one of a trained pair known as Wally and Pegasus) flew over the heads of the audience to land on Hardman's arm. Wally had a penchant for beer and at times would detour and land on the table of an unsuspecting audience member. Hardman and Gillaspie performed together regularly as a duo over the next few years, collaborating on albums as well as gigs.

=== 1980s: More success and awards ===
In 1981, Hardman recorded "The Man From Brooklyn" and "Just One Time", two songs about American popular singer Barry Manilow. She led the Birmingham branch of his British fan club. Hardman's support for his music was controversial in some folk clubs, but she has always supported him and said that he was a major influence on her music. In 1984, Hardman took over running the Whitesnake Fan Club for the heavy rock band of that name. (She worked with Mel Galley, the lead guitarist of the band, for a series of gigs in 1985–86).

In 1985, Hardman co-wrote the theme music for the children's television programme - Talk, Write and Read. The programme won the Royal Television Society award for the best primary school television programme of 1986/87. Around that time, she joined up with Isaac Guillory for a number of concerts; they would each perform solo sets and then a set together.

Hardman suffered from a variety of throat problems during the mid-1980s, requiring a long course of hospital treatment. The clubs were full of secondhand smoke and she had strained her voice with inadequate sound systems. While some clubs agreed to ban smoking for her performances, others did not. Due to these conditions, she retired in 1991. But the following year she played one-off farewell gigs in Germany and Jersey.

=== 2000s: Comeback concerts ===
Hardman released Lost Leader (2000) and established an official website (RosieHardman.com). This helped revive interest among her long-term fans and the media, and to attract new fans. In 2006, 2007, and 2009, Hardman was supported by Graham Cooper in three comeback concerts.

=== Death ===
Hardman died on October 23, 2026, at the age of 81 at her home in Urmston, England, after having been ill for some time.

== Discography ==
=== Albums ===
- 1969: "Queen of Hearts" (album). Folk Heritage. FHR 002M.
- 1970: "Second Season Came" (with Bob Axford) Trailer Records. LER 3018.
- 1970: "The Folk Trailer" (Sampler album, including 'Strangely Moved' from Second Season Came). Trailer Records. LER 2019.
- 1971: "Firebird". Trailer Records. LER 2075.
- 1974: "The First Folk Review Record". (Sampler album – including 'Latin Lady' and 'Spare Rib Rag'). Folksound Records. FS 100.
- 1975: "For My Part". (Cassette only) Mount Recordings. MRS 3 WH.
- 1975: "Jerseyburger". Alida Star Records. ASC 7754.
- 1978: "Eagle Over Blue Mountain". Plant Life Records. PLR 014.
- 1980: "Stopped in My Tracks". Plant Life Records. PLR 023.
- 1983: "The Weakness of Eve". Plant Life Records. PLR 053.
- 2000: "The Lost Leader", Rosie Hardman Independent Publication VAMP01.
- 2006: "Rosie Bytes!"(Compilation CD of Live MP3 tracks – mainly previously unrecorded material)
- 2007: "The Lady For Today Concert". Limited Edition CD of the Live Concert with Graham Cooper in October 2006.

=== Singles ===
- 1981: The Man From Brooklyn / Just One Time, Burlington/Plant Life Records. BURLS 002.

=== Cover versions ===
A number of Rosie's songs have been covered by other artists. These include:

- "Andrew" covered by Geoff Smedley (Album: Love is Mine (1972)) and Tranby Croft (Album: Timeline (1996))
- "Child of Merseyside" covered by Jacqui and Bridie (Album: Next Time Round (1972))
- "Will Taylor" covered by Paul and Glen (Album: Paul and Glen (1972))and Jacqui and Bridie (Album: Next Time Round (1972))
- "Dark Side of the Moon" covered by Miriam Backhouse (Album: Gypsy Without a Road (1977))
- "England" covered by Triple H (Album: Christchurch Acoustic (1998))
- "Fiddler Man" covered by Andy Caven (Album: Early Days (1980))
- "Gypsy Without a Road" covered by Miriam Backhouse (Album: Gypsy Without a Road (1977))
- "Lady For Today" covered by: The Fabulous Mid Life Crisis Band (1995); Doreen Lewis (1988)); Contraband (1974); Harewood Magna (1974); Jacqui and Bridie (1972); Geoff Smedley (1972); Mae McKenna (1976) and Graham Cooper (1977).
- "Pride of The River" covered by Graham Cooper (Album: Graham Cooper(1997).
- "Song to the Evening Sky" covered by The Lonesome Travellers (Album: The Lonesome Travellers (1970))
- "Tongue Tied" covered by Pat Tate (1973)
- "Will Taylor" covered by Paul and Glen (Album: Paul and Glen (1972))
- "Mosaic" covered by John & Rosy Goacher (Album: Begone Dull Care! (1977))
