= Algerian scale =

Musical scale

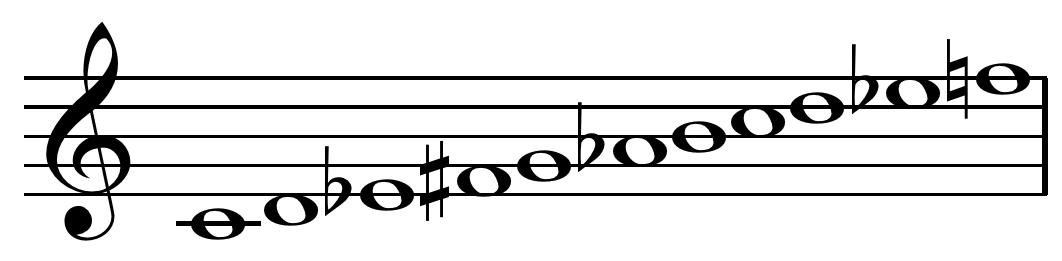
(Middlebrook 1984)

The Algerian Scale is a scale frequently used in Algerian music. The frequent use of 1.5 steps (a minor 3rd) in the scale contributes to a sound commonly associated with Moorish music.

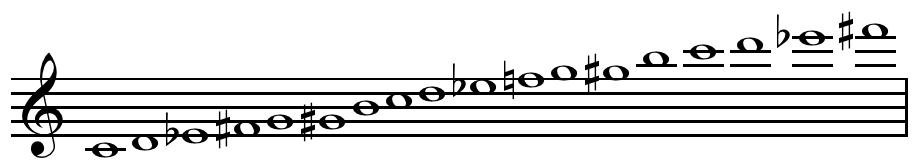
(Fischer 1996)

It is also defined as an eleven note scale with two augmented seconds. Jacques Ibert first used this definition in Escales (1924).

In India's Carnatic music, this corresponds to Simhendramadhyamam.

== Scale formula ==
In step notation:

- W, H, WH, H, H, WH, H
- W = Whole step
- H = Half step
- WH = Whole-and-a-half step

or in decimals:

- 1 step + 0.5 step + 1.5 step + 0.5 step + 0.5 step + 1.5 step + 0.5 step.

This formula gives the first octave only. In the second octave, the third step is 1 rather than 1.5, followed by a step of 1 rather than 0.5. This may be seen in images to the right. In the one on the bottom (with the three-octave spanning scale, Fischer 1996), the lower octave shows an F♯ while the upper octave shows an F natural.

This can also be notated as degrees in relation to the root note:

- First octave: 1 2 ♭3 ♯4 5 ♭6 7 8
- Second octave: 1 2 ♭3 4 5 ♭6 7 8

It can also be thought of as Harmonic Minor with a raised 4 (Hungarian Minor) in the first octave.
