= Shirley Collins =

British folk singer (born 1935)

Shirley Collins MBE
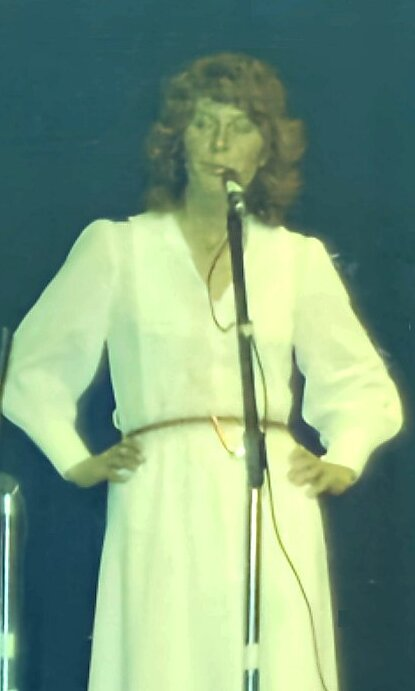
- Collins in 1978

Background information
- Born: Shirley Elizabeth Collins; 5 July 1935 (age 91); Hastings, Sussex, England
- Genre: Folk
- Occupation: Singer
- Instruments: Vocals, guitar, banjo, dulcimer
- Years active: 1955–1979, 2014–present
- Website: www.shirleycollins.co.uk

Shirley Elizabeth Collins MBE (born 5 July 1935) is an English folk singer who was a significant contributor to the British Folk Revival of the 1960s and 1970s. She often performed and recorded with her sister Dolly, whose accompaniment on piano and portative organ created unique settings for Shirley's plain, austere singing style.

== Biography ==
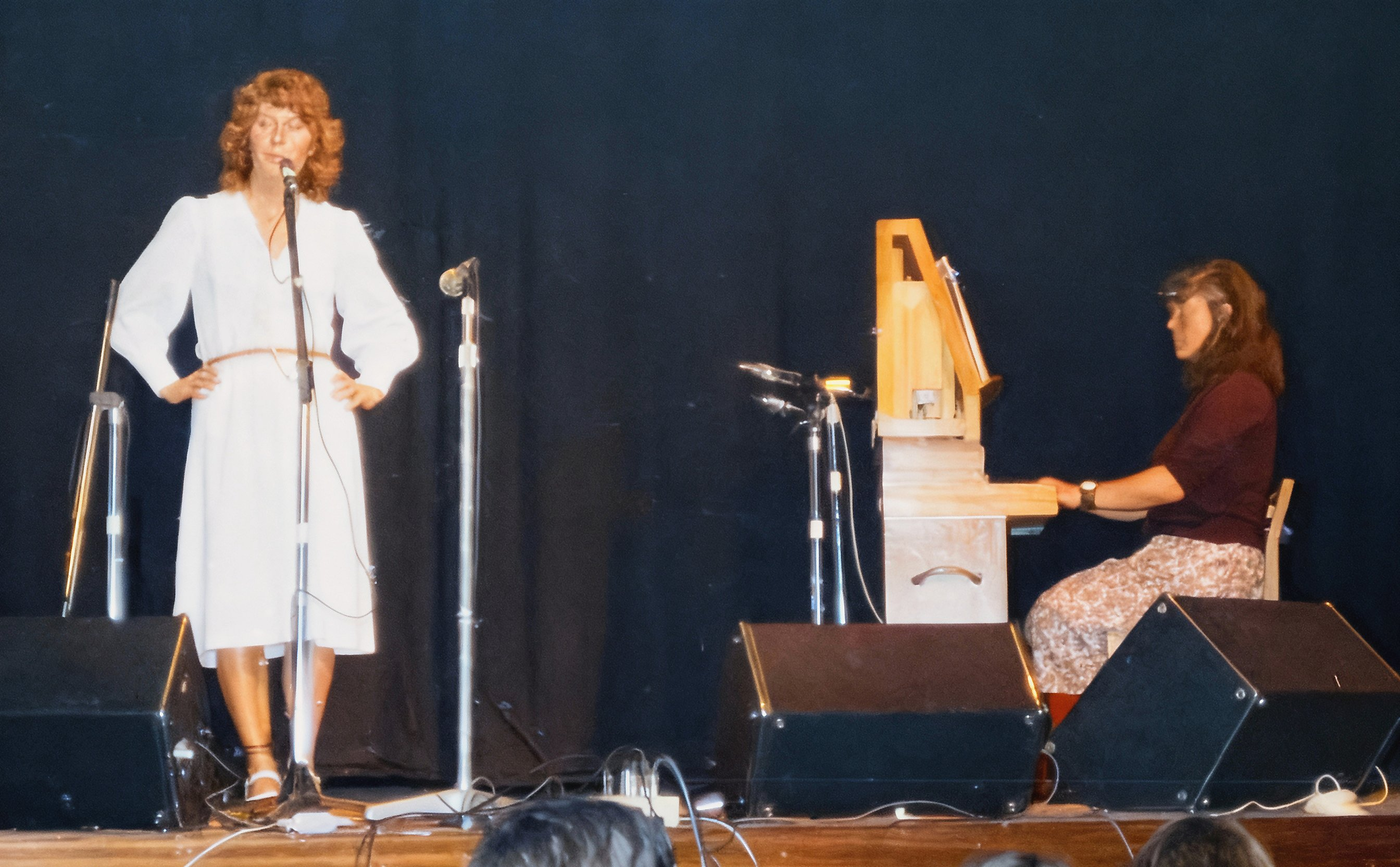
Shirley Collins (left) with Dolly Collins on stage, 1978

=== Early life ===
Shirley Collins was born in Hastings, East Sussex, England on 5 July 1935. Her father left the family when she was about twelve or thirteen, and her Uncle Fred, who was an author, largely took his place. She grew up, with her older sister Dolly, in the area, in a family which kept alive a great love of traditional song. Songs learnt from their grandfather and from their mother's sister, Grace Winborn, were to be important in the sisters' repertoire throughout their career.

On leaving school, at the age of 17, Collins enrolled at a teachers' training college in Tooting, south London. In London she also involved herself in the early folk revival, making her first appearance on vinyl on the 1955 compilation Folk Song Today.

In 1954, at a party hosted by Ewan MacColl, she met Alan Lomax, the American folk song collector, who had moved to Britain to avoid the McCarthy witch-hunt, which was then raging in America. Lomax and Collins lived together in London, with Collins assisting Lomax on various European projects and singing backing vocals on a version of MacColl's "Dirty Old Town" by Alan Lomax and the Ramblers, in 1956. "I was madly in love with him," Collins said of Lomax.

=== First albums ===
In 1958, Collins recorded her first two albums, Sweet England and False True Lovers, featuring sparse arrangements, with Collins accompanying herself on the banjo. Sweet England was released in 1959 and False True Lovers in 1960. Collins also recorded a series of EPs in 1958 and 1959 with The Foggy Dew and English Songs being released in 1959.

From July to November 1959, Collins and Lomax made a folk song collecting trip in the Southern U.S. states. It resulted in many hours of recordings, featuring performers such as Almeda Riddle, Hobart Smith, and Bessie Jones, and is noted for the discovery of Mississippi Fred McDowell. Recordings from this trip were issued by Atlantic Records under the title "Sounds of the South", and some were re-enacted in the Coen brothers’ film O Brother, Where Art Thou?. The experience of her life with Lomax, and the making of the recordings in religious communities, social gatherings, prisons and chain gangs was described in Collins' book America Over the Water (published 2005).

Back in Britain, Collins met Austin John Marshall, whom she later married. She also proceeded with her singing career, appearing on three compilations albums (A Jug of Punch, A Pinch of Salt and Rocket Along) in 1960 and an EP, Heroes in Love, in 1963 (now included with False True Lovers on the CD release). It was after that, in a series of influential albums, that she helped to introduce many innovations into the English folk revival. In 1964, she recorded the landmark jazz-folk fusion of Folk Roots, New Routes, with guitarist Davey Graham.

English Songs Volume 2 and Shirley Sings Irish were both released in 1964.

=== The Sweet Primeroses ===
1967 saw the essentially southern English song collection, The Sweet Primeroses, with Collins accompanied for the first time by her sister Dolly's portative organ. 1968's The Power of the True Love Knot also featured Dolly's accompaniment. 1969 brought another collaboration, The Holly Bears the Crown, this time with The Young Tradition – featuring, in addition to Dolly Collins, Peter Bellamy, Heather Wood, and Royston Wood. This album was not released until 1995.

=== Anthems in Eden ===
Anthems in Eden was released in 1969, the first album to be credited to Shirley and Dolly Collins. It featured a suite of songs centred on the changes in rural England brought about by the First World War. Dolly Collins created arrangements featuring David Munrow and various other players from his Early Music Consort. The unusual combination of ancient instruments included rebecs, sackbuts, viols and crumhorns. All these recordings strove to marry a deep love and understanding of the English folk music heritage with a more contemporary attitude to musical settings.

Anthems in Eden was followed by Love, Death and the Lady, also co-credited with Dolly, in 1970.

=== Albion Country and Etchingham Steam Bands ===
Collins married her second husband Ashley Hutchings in 1971. He left Steeleye Span that year and he and Collins assembled the first incarnation of the Albion Country Band to accompany her on the 1971 album No Roses, with a total of 27 musicians participating over numerous sessions. Collins also provided guest vocals on the Hutchings project Morris On in 1972. Following the breakup of a later version of the Albion Country band in 1973 (shortly after recording the album Battle of the Field) the couple created the all acoustic Etchingham Steam Band with Terry Potter, Ian Holder and Vic Gammon, in 1974.

The couple were living in Etchingham at the time and the decision to eschew electricity was inspired by the Three-Day Week. The Etchingham's repertoire was drawn from the traditional music of Sussex. The only recording by the band available at the time appeared on the 1974 compilation album A Favourite Garland, although Terry Potter and Ian Holder (as well as Simon Nicol and Roger Swallow, formerly of the Albion Country Band) appear on some tracks on Adieu to Old England, a Collins album also released in 1974 (and produced by Ashley Hutchings). Live recordings of the Etchingham Steam Band from 1974 and 1975 were released on a self-titled CD in 1995.

A largely new group of musicians (with some participation from Etchingham Steam Band members) was assembled for two 1976 releases: the Morris On follow up Son of Morris On (with Collins again providing vocals); and the newly recorded tracks for the Shirley and Dolly Collins album Amaranth (half of which was a reissue of the side-long suite of songs from Anthems in Eden). The involvement of Philip Pickett and John Sothcott in these recordings saw a return to the use of early music instruments. The bulk of the musicians became The Albion Dance Band, performing traditional material on a mixture of modern (electric) and early music instruments, with Collins on vocals. They recorded the album The Prospect Before Us and a BBC session in 1976, with a single ("Hopping Down in Kent", Roud 1715) released that year and the album following in 1977. Live recordings from this period were released on the CD Dancing Days are Here Again in 2007.

=== Retirement ===
1978's For As Many As Will was the last studio album recorded by Shirley and Dolly Collins, although live recordings from 1979 have been issued since, and in 1979 she released a single, "The Mariner's Farewell", with Bert Jansch. Collins does not appear on the next Albion Band album (Rise Up Like the Sun, recorded in 1977 and released in 1978, with the "Dance" dropped from the band name) and decided to focus on home life and her children from her first marriage, while Hutchings and the Albion Band collaborated on several National Theatre productions. It was during this period that Hutchings left Collins. The painful divorce was followed by loss of her voice and "the ability to sing entirely", through dysphonia, leading to her retirement from music.

Her music career seemingly over, Collins resorted to "a number of low-paid jobs"—including employment at the British Library and the job centre—to get by, and she sold her old equipment.

She made one last appearance with the Albion Band, on the 1980 album Lark Rise to Candleford (the soundtrack of the plays). In 1993 David Tibet of the apocalyptic folk band Current 93 released a collection of her recordings, entitled Fountain of Snow, on his Durtro label. Since then, she has appeared on a number of Current 93 recordings.

=== 21st century ===
"What I love about folk is that it’s the archaeology of music. It’s as important as that. You dig up something and it’s valuable and tells you about the time it comes from".

— Shirley Collins

Collins sang on the final version of "Idumæa" on Current 93's 2006 album Black Ships Ate the Sky. In 2009 Topic Records included in their 70th anniversary boxed set Three Score and Ten two tracks from The Sweet Primeroses: "All Things Are Quite Silent" and "The Rigs of the Time".

With actor Pip Barnes, she toured with her three illustrated talks "America over the Water" (about her field trip in the Southern States of America with Alan Lomax), "A Most Sunshiny Day" (about the traditional music of England and Sussex in particular), and "I'm a Romany Rai" (about the Gypsy singers and songs of Southern England). She also edited a CD entitled I'm a Romany Rai (2012) in the series The Voice of the People.

In 2013, Collins appeared on Justin Hopper's text composition, "Fourth River: Ley Line", to be released on the Contraphonic Sound Series. On 8 February 2014, at Union Chapel, Islington, in London, Collins sang for the first time for many years, performing two songs; "All the Pretty Little Horses" and "Death and the Lady". She was accompanied by Ian Kearey from the band Oysterband.

She returned to recording and in November 2016, Collins released Lodestar, her first new album in 38 years. Earning two BBC Radio 2 Folk Award nominations for the work, considered her best by some, she found this late success highly improbable, saying: "I never believed it could happen. It's a bit of a miracle, really."

Lodestar was followed in July 2020 by another album of new material, entitled Heart's Ease. The album included re-recordings of some songs she had sung in her twenties, such as "Barbara Allen". In a five-star review, The Guardian described it as "...a more confident follow-up [to Lodestar]", saying: "The veteran singer's comeback really takes wing with this impeccably judged set."

Another album of new recordings, Archangel Hill, was released in May 2023, featuring songs chosen by Collins – some traditional and some by her favourite modern writers.

In August 2023, Collins was the guest for BBC Radio 4's Desert Island Discs, where her choices included "61 Highway Blues" by Mississippi Fred McDowell, "A Heart Needs A Home" by Richard and Linda Thompson and "The Birds in the Spring" by the Copper Family.

== The Ballad of Shirley Collins ==
A film about her life, The Ballad of Shirley Collins, was released in October 2017. She was not sure such attention was warranted, saying: "When they first asked me I was nonplussed. I thought, 'is this a wind-up?'"

== Honours, awards, distinctions ==
- In 2004, Collins was awarded a Gold Badge by the English Folk Dance and Song Society.
- She was awarded the MBE for services to music in the 2007 New Year's Honours List.
- She holds an Honorary Degree from the Open University (for a "notable contribution to education and culture") and an Honorary Doctorate from the University of Sussex.
- In 2008, she was elected as president of the English Folk Dance and Song Society and received the "Good Tradition" award at the BBC Radio 2 Folk Awards.
- She is currently patron of the South East Folk Arts Network and Folk South West.
- Collins garnered two BBC Radio 2 Folk Award nominations for her seventh studio album, Lodestar, released in 2016.
- A film about her life, The Ballad of Shirley Collins, was released in October 2017.

== Influence ==
The American folk-rock band 10,000 Maniacs did a cover of "Just as the Tide was Flowing", closely modelled on the version on the No Roses album.

Billy Bragg said of her: "Shirley Collins is without doubt one of England's greatest cultural treasures."

Few singers of the English folk revival have attempted as much on record as Collins. "I like music to be fairly straightforward, simply embellished – the performance without histrionics allowing you to think about the song rather than telling you what to think."

Colin Meloy of The Decemberists recorded a whole EP of Shirley Collins tunes. It was sold on Meloy's 2006 spring United States tour in limited quantities.

== Discography ==
- Sweet England – Argo (1959)
- False True Lovers – Folkways Records (1960)
- The Foggy Dew (EP) – Collector Records (1960)
- English Songs (EP) – Collector Records (1960)
- Heroes in Love (EP) – Topic (1963)
- Shirley Sings Irish (EP) – Collector Records (1964)
- English Songs Volume 2 with Robin Hall (EP) – Collector Records (1964)
- The Sweet Primeroses – Topic (1967)
- The Power of the True Love Knot – Polydor (1968)
- Adieu to Old England – Topic (1974)
- Amaranth – EMI Harvest (1976) – [one LP side of new material, paired with a reissue of "A Song Story (Medley)" from Anthems in Eden]
- The Bonny Cuckoo (EP) – Fledg'ling Records (2015)
- Lodestar – Domino Recording Company (2016)
- Heart′s Ease – Domino Recording Company (2020)
- Crowlink (EP) – Domino Recording Company (2021)
- Archangel Hill – Domino Recording Company (2023)
- Hares on the Mountain (Fast Version) (EP) – Domino Recording Company (2025)

=== Shirley and Dolly Collins ===
- Anthems in Eden – EMI Harvest (1969)
- Love, Death and the Lady – EMI Harvest (1970)
- For as Many as Will – Topic (1978)
- Harking Back – Durtro (recorded 1978–79, released 1998) – [live]
- Snapshots – Fledg'ling (recorded 1966 and 1978–79, released 2006) – [demo and live recordings]

=== Shirley Collins and the Albion Country Band ===
- No Roses – Pegasus (1971)

=== Shirley Collins with Ashley Hutchings/The Albion Band ===
- Morris On, by Ashley Hutchings, Richard Thompson, Dave Mattacks, John Kirkpatrick and Barry Dransfield – Island/Carthage (1972)
- Son of Morris On, by Ashley Hutchings and others – Harvest (1976)
- The Prospect Before Us, by The Albion Dance Band – Harvest (1977)
- Lark Rise To Candleford, by The Albion Band – Charisma (1980)
- The BBC Sessions, by The Albion Band – Strange Fruit (1998) (tracks 5–8, recorded 1976)
- Dancing Days Are Here Again, by The Albion Dance Band – Talking Elephant (2007) (recorded 1976)

=== The Young Tradition and Shirley and Dolly Collins ===
- The Holly Bears the Crown – Fledg'ling (recorded 1969, released 1995)

=== Shirley Collins and Davy Graham ===
- Folk Roots, New Routes – Decca (1964)

=== Etchingham Steam Band (includes Shirley Collins) ===
- Etchingham Steam Band – Fledg'ling (recorded 1974–75, released 1995) – [live]

=== Compilations ===
- A Favourite Garland – Gama (1974) – [compilation]
- Fountain of Snow – Durtro (1992) – [compilation]
- The Classic Collection – Highpoint (2004) – [compilation]
- Within Sound – Fledg'ling (2003) – [box set, compilation]
- The Harvest Years – EMI (2008) – [compilation of Anthems in Eden, Love, Death and the Lady and Amaranth, with one track each from Son of Morris On and The Prospect Before Us]

== Autobiography ==
- Shirley Collins, America Over the Water, SAF Publishing, 2004. ISBN 0-946719-66-7
- Shirley Collins, All in the Downs: Reflections on Life, Landscape, and Song, Strange Attractor Press, 2018.

== See also ==
- Music of Sussex
