= Peter Bellamy =

English singer (1944–1991)

Peter Franklyn Bellamy (8 September 1944 – 24 September 1991) was an English folk singer. He was a founding member of The Young Tradition and also had a long solo career, recording numerous albums and touring folk clubs and concert halls. He is noted for his ballad-opera The Transports, and has been acknowledged as a major influence by performers of later generations including Damien Barber, Oli Steadman, and Jon Boden.

== Early years ==
Peter Bellamy was born in Bournemouth, England, and spent his formative years in North Norfolk, living in the village of Warham and attending Fakenham Grammar School in the late 1950s and early 1960s. His father, Richard Reynell Bellamy, worked as a farm bailiff at that time. Peter Bellamy studied at Norwich School of Art, and later at Maidstone College of Art, and decades later still retained something of the flamboyant art student image, being described as looking like a latter-day Andy Warhol, with blond hair often worn in a ponytail and tied back with a ribbon, a scarlet jacket and florally-patterned trousers which he made himself from furnishing fabric.

Encouraged by his friend Anne Briggs, he dropped out of college in 1965 to become a member of "The Young Tradition" with Royston Wood and Heather Wood. The trio recorded mainly traditional songs in close harmony and mostly without accompaniment. The Young Tradition projected their voices powerfully, clearly influenced by The Watersons, the Copper Family and Ewan MacColl. They recorded three albums together plus a collaboration with Shirley Collins called The Holly Bears The Crown. Although recorded in 1969, this was not released in full until the 90s.

The Young Tradition's final concert was at Cecil Sharp House in October 1969, after which they split up, with Bellamy wanting to concentrate on traditional English music, whilst the other members had developed interests in mediaeval music.

In 1971, Bellamy recorded a collaboration with Louisa Killen: "Won't You Go My Way?".

== Solo work ==
Peter Bellamy's first solo album Mainly Norfolk (1968) indicated his desire to promote the folk music of his part of England. It drew heavily on the repertoire of Harry Cox, still alive at that time, who was the most famous traditional singer of Norfolk songs. On the album, Bellamy sang all songs unaccompanied. Beginning on his second album, Fair England's Shore (1968), he began to accompany himself on the Anglo concertina. Still later, he occasionally recorded with guitar.

It wasn't until Bellamy's eighth album in 1975 that he recorded any of his own compositions. In the same year he recorded a collection of Rudyard Kipling's Barrack Room Ballads (see below).

Having mastered the art of putting new words to a traditional song and his own words to a traditional tune, he wrote a ballad-opera, The Transports, in 1973, but it took him 4 years to find a company willing to produce it. It then became the folk record of the year for 1977 vindicating his long wait and many efforts to get it released. Many prominent names in the folk scene collaborated on the project, including Dolly Collins (a composer, the sister of Shirley Collins), Martin Carthy, Mike Waterson, Norma Waterson, June Tabor, Nic Jones, A.L. Lloyd, Cyril Tawney and Dave Swarbrick. It told the true story of the first transport ship to land in Australia and the first couple, Henry and Susannah Cable (or Kabel), to marry on Australian soil, based on a story Peter found in the local newspaper in Norfolk and followed by his research into the details at the city museum and library. Descendants of the Kabel family still live in Sydney and became friends of Peter. In 2004 it was re-released together with a new production involving Simon Nicol and Fairport Convention. In 1986 Sid Kipper and others devised a ballad opera called Crab Wars. It was partly a parody of The Transports, but Bellamy took it in good humour and even sang the role of narrator.

Another of Bellamy's ambitious projects, The Maritime Suite, was broadcast on BBC Radio 2 in November 1982, but never issued on record.

The economics of folk singing meant that Bellamy sold his own limited edition cassettes at folk clubs, and many performances exist only as pirated tapes. It is said that Celtic Records have a large cache of quality recordings that are unlikely to be issued.

Continuing his early talents with the visual arts, Bellamy generally designed his own album jackets and also drew cartoons for Fred Woods's Folk Review magazine (for which he also showed considerable talent and fluency as a writer of reviews and features). He continued to exhibit and sell his paintings throughout his life.

Sydney Opera House once hosted a concert by him and he toured in the USA.

Although at folk clubs, and in private, he often accompanied blues on bottleneck guitar, these performances rarely appeared on his albums: an exception is an attenuated version of Robert Johnson's "Stones in My Passway", on the Young Tradition's Galleries. A hiss redolent of an old 78 record was added, but this joke misfired: a Transatlantic Records press officer later told interviewer Michael Grosvenor Myer that quite a few copies were returned as 'faulty' as a result!

In 2009 Topic Records included in their 70-year anniversary boxed set Three Score and Ten "When I Die" from Both Sides Then as track nine of the second CD.

== Recording Kipling's ballads ==
Bellamy started his exploration of Kipling as a source for songs, not with the Barrack Room Ballads but with the songs from Kipling's Children's books, (Puck of Pook's Hill and Rewards and Fairies) from which he produced two albums, Oak Ash and Thorn and Merlyn's Isle of Gramarye.

Kipling's Barrack Room Ballads were published in 1892, and Bellamy started setting them to music in 1973. He was struck by people's misconceptions about Kipling, who many perceived as (in Bellamy's words) "one of the reactionary old guard, and therefore obviously a writer of no merit whatsoever". In reality, Kipling had captured a real insight into the attitudes of the ordinary soldiers, such as their contempt for those civilians who would shrug the soldiers off during peacetime but will encourage and cheer them on when the soldiers are leaving for battle:

It's Tommy this, an' Tommy that, an' 'Chuck him out, the brute!'
But it's 'Saviour of 'is country' when the guns begin to shoot.
An' it's Tommy this, an' Tommy that, an' anything you please;
An' Tommy ain't a bloomin' fool – you bet that Tommy sees!" (Tommy)

When composing the musical settings for Kipling's poetry, Bellamy had a theory, shared with many others, that highly metrical poets like Kipling used song tunes to keep their poems flowing properly. Some of Kipling's contemporaries confirm that he was in the habit of humming and whistling as he composed. It has, for example, been claimed that in The Loot, there is a "hidden" tune being worked to, and that nothing else can explain the strange refrains. Bellamy became excited when the line in "Dutch in the Medway" "our ships in every harbour...." reminded him of the line in the song "Cupid's Garden" "Twas down in Portsmouth Harbour...". This observation suggested the tune for the Kipling poem and made him wonder whether Kipling had actually composed to that tune, it being a common folk song in the 19th century and certainly part of the repertoire of the remarkable Copper family of Sussex who had lived in Rottingdean when Kipling was also living there. (A local man called Copper appears briefly in Rewards and Fairies.) It has also been suggested that Kipling's "My name is O'Kelly, I've heard the reveille..." was written to the common Irish song and Army marching tune "Lillibullero". Bellamy found a different tune but agreed that "Lillibullero" was more likely to have been on Kipling's mind at the time of composition.

Initially, Bellamy's proposal to record the Ballads was vetoed by Kipling's daughter, and he had to wait until her death in 1976 before permission was finally granted by the Kipling Society.

The Barrack Room Ballads album was recorded by Bill Leader, with Chris Birch (brother of Bellamy's first wife) on fiddle and Tony Hall on melodeon. Chris also contributed to numerous other Bellamy albums, playing fiddle and guitar, singing and providing vocal arrangements. The Kipling Society went on to appreciate Bellamy's contribution to Kipling's legacy and he was elected a Fellow of the Kipling Society, becoming a vice-president in 1981.

A tribute album Oak, Ash and Thorn comprising songs from Bellamy's Oak, Ash & Thorn and Merlin's Isle of Gramarye, was released in 2011, with contributions from artists including Jon Boden, Olivia Chaney, Charlie Parr, Fay Hield, Tim Eriksen, Trembling Bells, The Unthanks, Jackie Oates, Sam Lee, Lisa Knapp and The Owl Service.

== Death ==
Bellamy died by suicide on 24 September 1991 in Keighley, an event that baffled many in the folk music community. At the time, he was working with Fellside Records on a project to record major British unaccompanied singing talents. However, according to a thread called 'Boring, Bleating Old Traddy' on the online Mudcat Cafe folk music forum, several of his friends had found him depressed at the way his folk club bookings had unaccountably fallen away after the respect with which The Transports had been received. Folk music journalist and critic Michael Grosvenor Myer, one of those who had named The Transports his record of the year in The Guardian, where he was subsequently to write his obituary, relates how Bellamy showed him an empty engagement book, saying, in sad and puzzled tones, "The Transports was a runaway success, since when my career has gone ppppffff!" Similarly from fellow folksinger Brian Peters: "The saddest Bellamy moment arose after I'd complimented him on a barnstorming performance the last time I'd seen him. With a wan smile, he picked up his diary and, holding it up for me to see, leafed through empty page after empty page, without saying a word." American folksinger Lisa Null, a longtime friend, writes "He was broke, unable to find gigs, unable to adapt. He complained so much about this, many of us kind of got used to it -- a bad mistake. He was sending out warning signs." Another singer, Nick Dow, adds, "In respect of his empty gig diary, we were chatting on the phone, and he asked me 'Nick how do you get so much work?' I answered that it was because I was a persuasive bastard and wasn't averse to making a nuisance of myself. He replied that he couldn't easily ring up and ask for a gig, he found it so embarrassing. He was a singer and performer, not a businessman in any shape or form. Peter needed our help, and the oxygen of the appreciation of his art."

Bellamy's widow, Jenny, later told Michael Grosvenor Myer that shortly before his death, he had spent a whole day listening intently and self-critically to his entire record output, saying at the end "But I am good. What the hell has gone wrong?"

Karl Dallas's obituary published in The Independent concluded with the words:

Though his roots were obvious to anyone with half an ear, he added much of himself to what he inherited, and was a giant in a world where the pygmy is the standard by which all must be measured. It was unable to contain him, but now he is dead he will no doubt be consigned to the pantheon where the more threatening icons of our time can be tucked away safely, as relics of a past golden age. Peter Bellamy knew that the golden age is now, and he made it more glorious with his presence. His vast recorded output will be an inspiration to all who follow after.

His life and work were fondly celebrated by a day of performances including The Transports at Conway Hall in London on 2 October 1992, 13 months after his death. Heather Wood, his erstwhile Young Tradition colleague now living in New York, came over specifically to be present on the occasion.

== Vocal singing style ==
Bellamy had a distinctive singing style. In a "Borfolk" cartoon in the October 1980 edition of Southern Rag, commenting on an event at Cecil Sharp House compered by Peter Bellamy, he was given the anagrammatical name "Elmer P. Bleaty", a humorous comment on the slightly nasal vibrato of his voice. (Peter Bellamy later obtained, framed and hung the original of the cartoon in his home.)

Folk singer Jon Boden is a fan of Peter's bellowing style. He has jocularly put on his website "Bellamists subscribe to a belief in the absolute purity and oneness of all things Bellamy, and bleat daily incantations in the hope of advancing the day when he will finally return to reign in ever-lasting glory." He was himself good-natured, and even a bit proprietorial, about references to his style as "bleating". In addition to the self-given sobriquet of "boring bleating old traddy", picked out in letters on a Scrabble board on a self-designed record-sleeve photograph by Valerie Grosvenor Myer and used, as noted above, as title of a Mudcat Cafe thread, and to the anagrammatic name attributed to the cartoon character based on him mentioned in the previous paragraph, he once rejoined to a Folk Review magazine correspondent, who had attributed to his influence a preponderance of "Larry the Lamb" imitators in folk clubs, "Larry the Lamb imitations, dear Madam, are strictly my copyright!"

== Discography ==
- The Young Tradition
  - The Young Tradition (1966)
  - So Cheerfully Round (1967)
  - Galleries (1968)
  - Oberlin 1968 (1968) - recorded live at Oberlin College, Oberlin, Ohio, USA 17 November 1968
- The Young Tradition with Shirley and Dolly Collins
  - The Holly Bears The Crown (1969)
- Louis Killen and Peter Bellamy
  - Won't You Go My Way? (1971)
- Solo albums
  - Mainly Norfolk (1968)
  - Fair England's Shore (1968)
  - The Fox Jumped Over The Parson's Gate (1969)
  - Oak, Ash & Thorn (1970)
  - Merlin's Island of Gramarye (1972)
  - The Barrack Room Ballads of Rudyard Kipling (1975)
  - Peter Bellamy (1975)
  - Tell It Like It Was (1975)
  - Both Sides Then (1979)
  - Fair Annie (1981) - with Chris Birch
  - Keep on Kipling (1982)
  - The Maritime England Suite (1982)
  - Second Wind (1985)
  - Rudyard Kipling Made Exceedingly Good Songs (1989)
  - Soldiers Three (1990)
  - Songs an' Rummy Conjurin' Tricks (1991)
- Compilation
  - Wake The Vaulted Echoes (1999) - 3 CDs
  - The Ballads of Peter Bellamy: Big, Broadside & Barrack Room (2008)
- Various artists including Peter Bellamy
  - The Transports (1977)
- "Friends of Peter Bellamy"
  - The Transports (2004)
