= Portative organ =

Small pipe organ commonly used in 12th- to 16th-century Europe

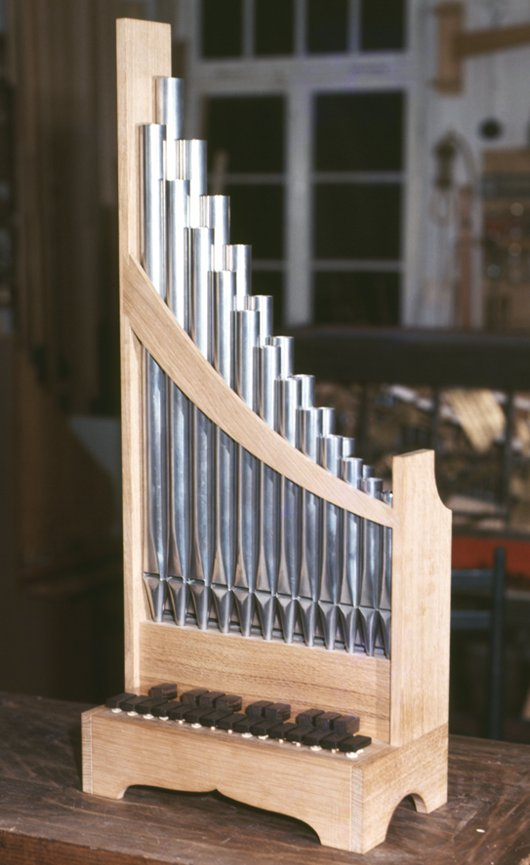
A historical-style portative organ built in Germany in 1979

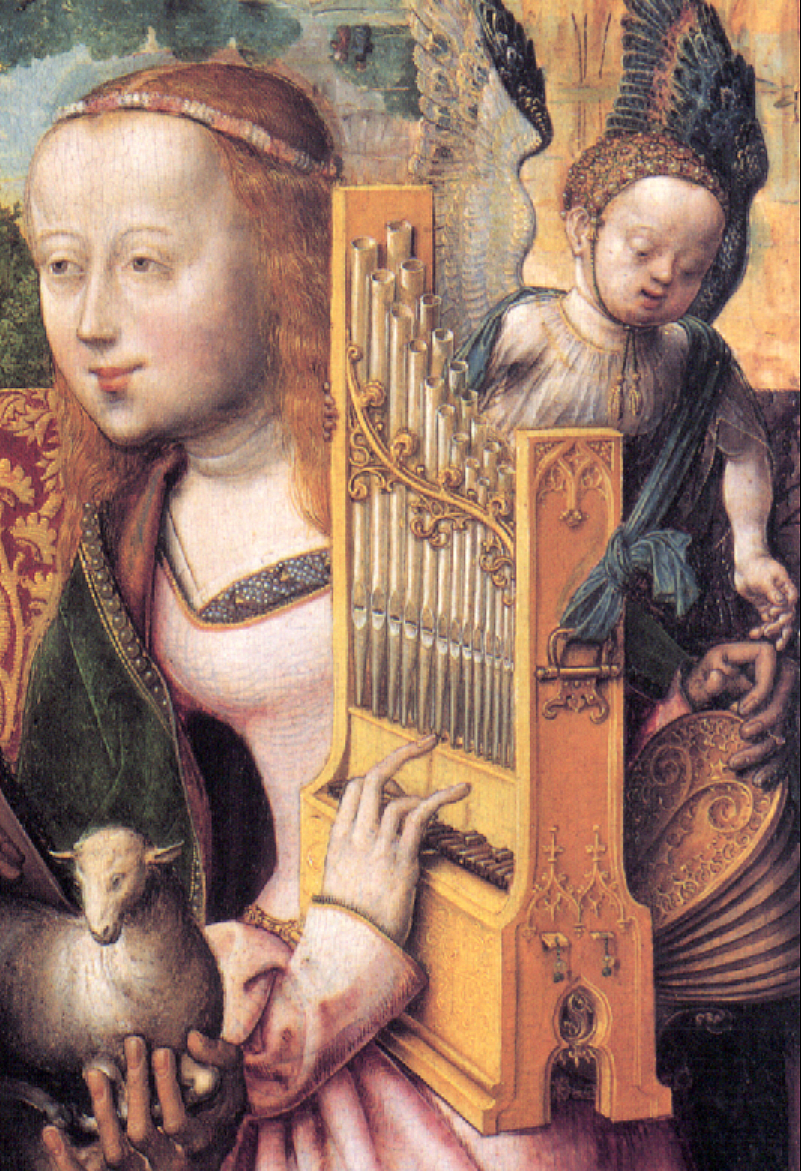
A depiction of Saint Cecilia playing a portative (detail from the Bartholomäusaltar in the Alte Pinakothek). The bellows can be seen to the right of the pipes.

A portative organ (from the Latin verb portare, "to carry"), also known during Italian Trecento as the organetto, is a small pipe organ that consists of one rank of flue pipes, sometimes arranged in two rows, to be played while strapped to the performer at a right angle. The performer manipulates the bellows with one hand and fingers the keys with the other. The portative organ lacks a reservoir to retain a supply of wind and so it produces sound only while the bellows are being operated. The instrument was commonly used in European secular music from the 12th to the 16th centuries.

The Italian composer Francesco Landini is known to have played the instrument. There are performers on the instrument again as a result of the Early Music Revival. Some contemporary music has been written for it, for example by José María Sánchez-Verdú. Dolly Collins also used it in modern English folk music.

== Terminology ==
The portative organ is also called a portatif organ, portativ organ, organetto, or simply portative, portatif, or portativ.

== Construction ==
The portative is constructed simply in order to make it as portable as possible. The pipes are arranged on a small rectangular windchest and supplied with wind by one or two bellows placed at the back, or under the instrument. The row of pipes is supported by posts at either end and an oblique bar. The earlier style of keyboard on the portative consists of one button for each pipe. When a button is pushed in, the corresponding pipe sounds. The button is restored to its normal position by a horn spring. Renaissance instruments use keyboards similar to Renaissance harpsichords.

== Definitions ==
In principle, the portative is a smaller instrument than the positive organ, which features more ranks of pipes and a larger keyboard. The portative also should not be confused with the regal, a small keyboard instrument that contains a rank of short-length reed pipes instead of flue pipes.

In practice, however, since the organ reform movement revival of small organs, also small positives with a bass register and played with both hands have come to be called portatives, especially when their pipe arrangement or general layout resembles that of the genuine portative. One of the most well-known modern proponents of that kind of 'large portative' organ was Dolly Collins, who accompanied her vocalist sister Shirley Collins on many albums of traditional English folk songs.

== History ==
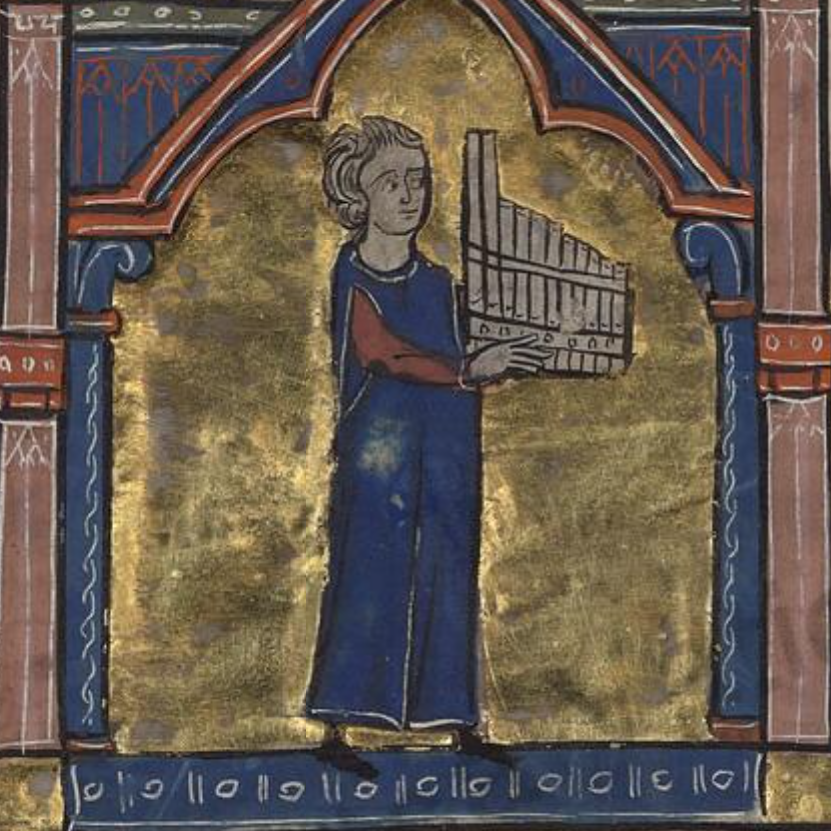
The trouvère Perrin d'Angicourt plays a portative organ in this miniature from the chansonnier Vatican Reg. lat. 1490.

Towards the middle of the 13th century, miniatures of illuminated manuscripts depict portatives with modern, balanced-action keyboards. An example can be seen in the Spanish manuscript known as the Cantigas de Santa Maria, which contains 51 miniatures of instrumentalists. It is evident from the position of the organist's thumb in these miniatures that the keys are pressed down to make the notes sound. There are nine pipes and nine keys, which is sufficient for a C-major diatonic scale of one octave with an added B-flat.

Medieval portative organs, so extensively used during the 14th and the 15th centuries, were revivals of those used by the Romans of which a specimen excavated at Pompeii in 1876 is preserved in the Museo Archeologico Nazionale Napoli. The case measures 14.5 by 9.33 in (36.8 by 23.7 cm) and contains nine pipes, of which the longest measures only 9.75 in (24.8 cm); six of the pipes have oblong holes at a short distance from the top similar to those made in gamba pipes of modern organs to give them their reedy quality, and also to those cut in the bamboo pipes of the Chinese sheng, which is a mouth organ furnished with free reeds. From the description of these remains by C. F. Abdy Williams, it would seem that a bronze plate 11.5 by 2.75 in (29.2 by 7.0 cm) having 18 rectangular slits arranged in three rows to form vandykes was found inside the case, with three little plates of bronze just wide enough to pass through the slits lying by it; this plate possibly formed part of the mechanism for the sliders of the keys.

The small instrument that is often taken for a syrinx on a contorniate medallion of Sallust in the Cabinet Impérial de France in Paris may be meant for a miniature portative.

== See also ==
- Positive organ
