= Hares on the Mountain =

English folk song

"Hares on the Mountain" (Roud 329) (otherwise titled "Blackbirds and Thrushes", "If All the Young Women", "Nancy Lay Sleeping", "The Knife in the Window", "Shepherd So Bold", "Sally My Dear", "Lightning and Thunder", "Crawling and Creeping" and "Ain't Gonna Do It No More") is an English folk song. Versions of this song have been collected from traditional singers in England, Canada and the US, and have been recorded by modern folk artists.

The English folk singer Shirley Collins (who probably learnt the song from a version collected by Cecil Sharp in Somerset) released a popular version in 1959 which inspired most of the popular renditions, including the recording by Alt-J for the film Bright (2017).

== Synopsis ==
This song is composed of two distinct parts, "Hares on the Mountain" and "The Knife in the Window", both of which have been collected as distinct songs. It may be that it started life as two different songs which were amalgamated by singers. A third theme, "Crawling and Creeping", apparently an adaptation of the "Knife in the Window" motif, occurs in the American tradition.

=== "Hares on the Mountain" ===
In this theme the singer imagines what would happen if young maidens (or in some cases young men) were transformed into various creatures or plants, and describes the response of the opposite gender:

If maidens could sing like blackbirds and thrushes [sung twice]

How many young men would hide in the bushes?
Sing fal-de-ral, tal de ral, fal-de-ral-day.

"If all those young men were as rushes a growing,

Then all those pretty maidens will get scythes go mowing".

The imagined transformations include hares on the mountain, sheep in the meadow, reeds a'growin', and others. One more modern version goes:

If all the young ladies were little white rabbits
And I was a hare, I would teach them bad habits".

There is a nonsense refrain which varies from singer to singer.

=== "Knife in the Window" ===
This section starts as a dialogue between two young lovers, demonstrating his incompetence and her initial caution and subsequent willingness (if somewhat blunt at times):

Now the door it is bolted, I cannot undo it x2

"Oh, now" she replied, "you must put your knee to it".

Sing fol-de-rol-i-do, sing fol-de-rol-day.

Most versions involve him cutting knots (at her instigation) in either his breeches or her "small things", hence the title:

"Now your small things are tight, love, and I cannot undo them". [sung twice]

"Oh, now" she replied, "there's a knife in the window"."

Sing fol-de-rol-i-do, sing fol-de-rol-day.

The song usually ends with the couple in bed together:

He took off his breeches and into bed tumbled [sung twice]

I'll leave you to guess how this young couple fumbled

To me whack fol the diddle di do, to me whack fol the diddle day

though one version, collected in Virginia from Asa Martin and titled "Lightning and Thunder", ends with the birth of a baby:

The knife it was got and the britches cut asunder [sung three times]

And then they went at it like lightnin' and thunder.
Sing fol-de-rol-day.

Well the babe it was born and they did all wonder [sung three times]
That it hadn't a-been killed by lightnin' and thunder.

Sing fol-de-rol-day.

A number of more explicit versions of this song have been collected under the title "Roll Your Leg Over".

=== "Crawling and Creeping" ===
In this reworking of more risque versions of the song like "Roll Your Leg Over me" the narrator dreams that he "went a-crawling and a-creeping And I crawled in the room where my baby was sleeping". She wakes up and screams, he is arrested and sentenced to nine months in jail. Each verse ends in the phrase "And I never want to do it again." or something similar. The song ends with a warning:

Listen here, young men, when you're sleeping

Don't never get the habit of crawling and creeping
And going in the room where your baby is sleeping

You'll never want to do it again.

== Early versions ==
=== Broadsides and early printed versions ===
A tune for the song was published under the name in The Complete Collection of Irish Music by George Petrie, published in London in 1902, under the title "If All the Young Maidens were Blackbirds and Trushes" (sic). No chap book or broadside ballads have come to light containing verses from either the "Hares on the Mountain" or the "Knife in the Window".

=== Versions collected from traditional singers ===
The Roud Folk Song Index includes 27 versions collected from English singers. These are mainly from Southern England and East Anglia, with a single version from Yorkshire. The index lists 13 distinct versions from the United States, of which seven are of the "Crawling and Creeping" type and three seem to be of each of the other motifs. There are two Canadian versions, both of the "Knife in the Window" type. (It isn't always possible to distinguish the types of this group of songs as some versions combine elements of the "Hares on the Mountain" and "Knife in the Window" types and collectors may use the same title for all examples they collect.)

Cecil Sharp collected many versions in the South of England, including one from a John Barnett of Bridgwater, Somerset in 1906 which he published in his Folk Songs From Somerset, seemingly the source of many popular recordings of the song.

Dozens of traditional versions of the song have been recorded, including two versions available on the British Library Sound Archive: a Yorkshire version recorded by Steve Gardham and sung by Dorothy Bavey and a Somerset version recorded by Bob Patten and sung by Charlie Showers. Other recorded versions by traditional singers include a rendition of "Hares on the Mountain" by Northamptonshire singer Jeff Wesley and a version of "Knife in the Window" by Suffolk singer Harry List.

== Popular recordings ==
Many revival singers have covered this song, beginning with Shirley Collins / Davey Graham in 1964, which she seemingly based on the 1906 Bridgwater version collected by Cecil Sharp and published in Folk Songs From Somerset. Josienne Clarke and Ben Walker recorded a version of this variant, as did Nashville-based rock band All Them Witches on their EP Lost and Found, and Jonny Kearney & Lucy Farrell on their six-track EP The North Farm Sessions (2010) who used an altered version of the same tune. The Local Honeys (Linda Jean Stokley and Montana Hobbs) recorded a live version at SomerSessions in Kentucky in 2016. Radie Peat & Daragh Lynch of Lankum recorded a popular version in 2018 inspired by Shirley Collins, and the English indie rock trio Alt-J recorded a variation of Hares on the Mountain for the soundtrack of the 2017 movie Bright. Fern Maddie recorded her version of the song in 2022. Nora Brown has also recorded her own version with Band in a Box in 2019.

Some musicians recorded completely different versions of the song originating from different sources, including Steeleye Span, Frankie Armstrong and Chris Wood / Andy Cutting.

== Discussion ==
According to the folk song collector John Howson, the song "is sometimes attributed to Samuel Lover (1797–1865), who included it in his novel Rory o’ More published in 1837. However, it probably predates Lover's book...."

Professor B H Bronson, published tunes for "Hares on the Mountain" in his epic work Traditional Tunes of the Child Ballads because he thought it was a version of The Twa Magicians (Child 44, Roud 1350). A.L. Lloyd refers to the song as an "attenuated form" of the ballad. Roy Palmer claims that "This is not merely a series of sexual metaphors, but an echo of the ancient songs and stories of metamorphosis, in which the pursued woman runs out of transformations and falls to the man."

However, Steve Roud and Julia Bishop argue that "To confuse the magical transformations in this ballad to the similes of our song, and to assume that one necessarily derives from the other, requires a giant leap of faith, backed by nothing more than the coincidence of hares, fishes, and so on." In the sleeve notes to her CD "Till the Grass O'ergrew the Corn" (1997) Frankie Armstrong comments "It is widely accepted that this song is derived from the rare ballad "The Two Magicians" (Child #44), although the conceit is surely obvious enough to have been independently invented and all traces of magic (and story) have disappeared, leaving us with a genial day-dream of lyric."
