= Pete Cooper (musician) =

Pete Cooper (born 18 November 1951) is a British, London-based fiddler, who performs as a solo artist, and with Cooper and Bolton and Rattle on the Stovepipe. Cooper is recognized as a pioneer of fiddle-singing.

He was born in Gnosall, Staffordshire, England. His travels around the world have inspired his playing of many traditional fiddle styles including Irish, American old-time music, Swedish, Eastern European and Scottish as well as the rich English tradition. He also teaches, composes and writes about fiddle music. He plays at Cecil Sharp House in London.
