= Dolly Collins =

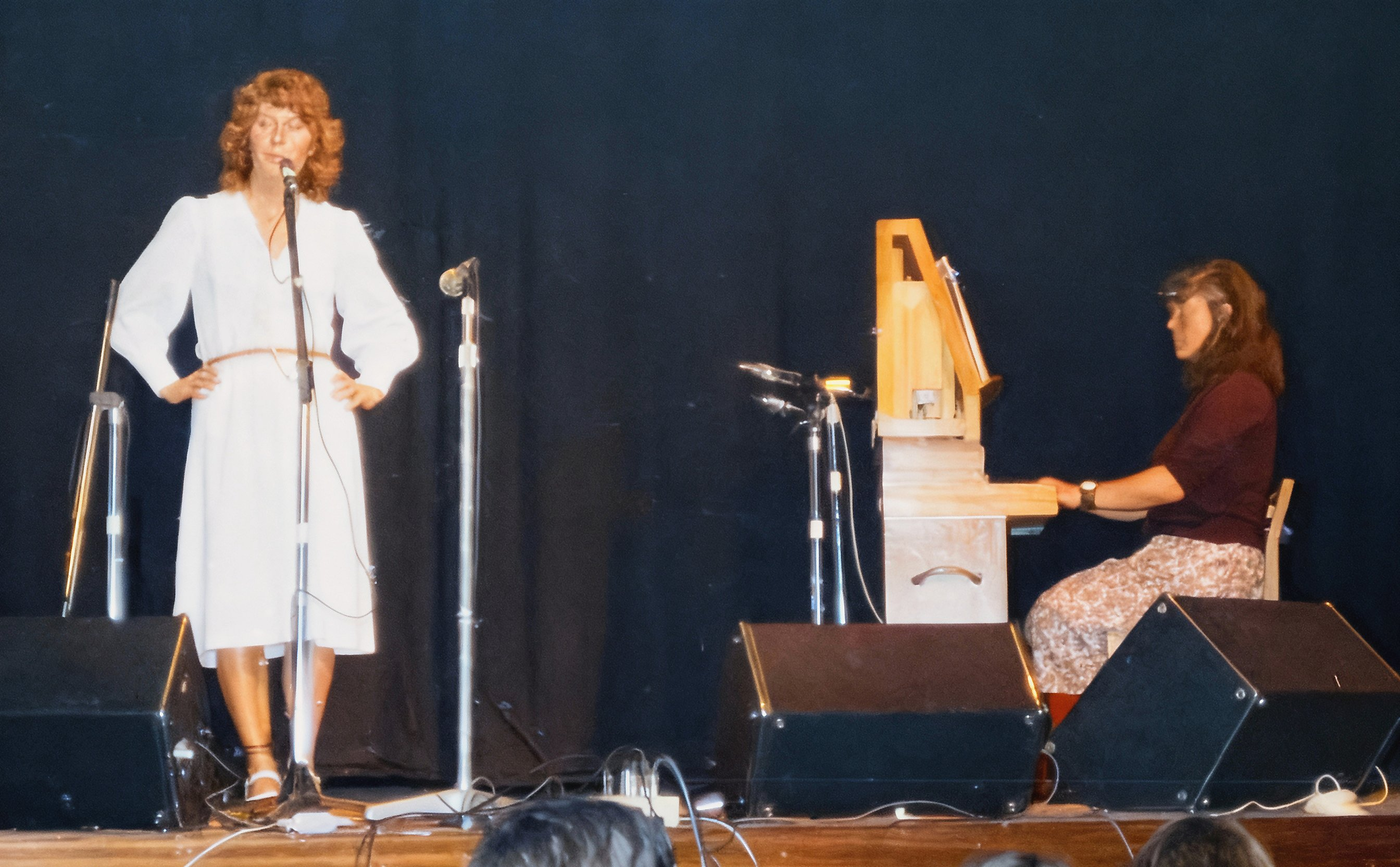
- Dolly Collins (right) on stage with her sister Shirley Collins (left) in 1978

Background information
- Born: Dorothy Ann Collins; 6 March 1933; Hastings, Sussex, England
- Died: 22 September 1995 (aged 62) Balcombe, West Sussex
- Genres: Folk music
- Instruments: Piano, portative organ
- Years active: 1960s, 1970s
- Labels: Harvest Records, Island Records

Dorothy Ann Collins (6 March 1933 – 22 September 1995), was an English folk musician, arranger and composer. She was the older sister of Shirley Collins.

Born in Hastings, Sussex (now East Sussex), she grew up in an artistic, socialist, folk singing family. She learned the piano at school, and then studied with composer Alan Bush while taking odd jobs in London, including working as a bus conductor. In the mid-1960s, she began working with her sister Shirley, who was establishing a reputation as a leading folk singer. She arranged some of Shirley's songs and, on the album Sweet Primeroses, accompanied her on portative organ.

Further work with Shirley followed: Shirley said "You could launch yourself off on a Dolly arrangement." In 1968, they produced the album Anthems in Eden, commissioned by BBC Radio and written for a six-piece early music consort directed by David Munrow, and regularly toured together. Dolly also worked as a musician and arranger with other singers and bands, including The Incredible String Band on The Hangman's Beautiful Daughter (1967), Matthews' Southern Comfort on their debut album (1969), Spirogyra on their third album Bells, Boots and Shambles (1973) and Peter Bellamy on the ballad opera The Transports (1977).

By the late 1970s, she retreated from touring and live concerts, and earned a living from gardening. Her last recordings were with Shirley on the album For As Many as Will (1978). She continued to compose, however, and just before her death she completed a cycle of First World War poems and a new mass written with the poet Maureen Duffy, the 'Missa Humana', which finally received its premiere on 25 February 2023 at Conway Hall, London (directed by John Andrews; produced by Lawrence Warner). She died at home in Balcombe, West Sussex.

== See also ==
- Music of Sussex
