= Richard Thompson discography =

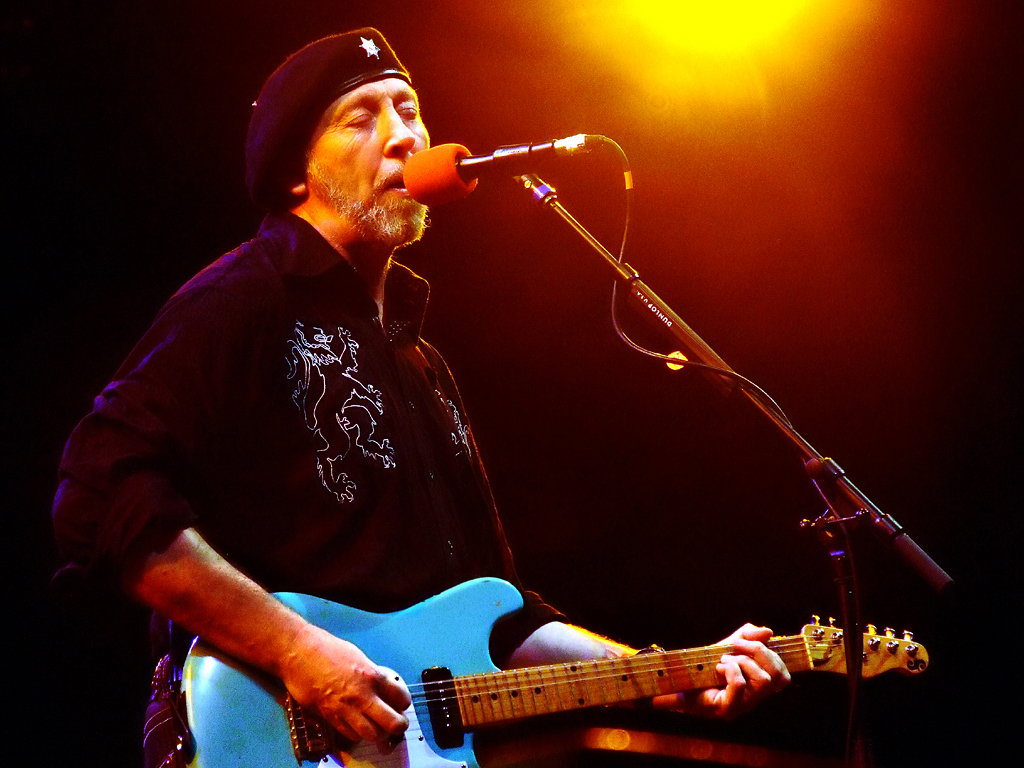
- Thompson performing at Prospect Park, New York City in 2007
- Studio albums: 28
- Extended plays: 3
- Live albums: 22
- Singles: 35

Richard Thompson is an English songwriter, musician (primarily a guitarist), singer and record producer. He has played and sung on almost 400 releases to date. His discography consists of around 30 studio albums in which he is a named primary artist, alongside live albums, singles, compilations, fan club and boutique label releases, soundtracks and collaborations.

Typically recording as a solo artist, he is also known for his collaborative releases with first wife Linda Thompson and his work as a member of Fairport Convention. He has also appeared as a guest performer with numerous other artists.

In the tables below the chart listings refer to the peak position the release reached in the UK Official Charts (UK Albums Chart or UK singles chart as appropriate) and the US Billboard charts (the Billboard 200 and its predecessors for albums and the Billboard Hot 100 for singles). A dash (—) indicates that the recording has not charted. When no column is given, this indicates that nothing in that table reached the relevant chart.

== Releases with Fairport Convention ==
This section covers releases of original recordings by Fairport Convention made while Thompson was a member of the band. After Thompson left, he continued to appear sporadically as a guest musician on subsequent studio albums, which are listed in the session work discography.

Live, particularly at Cropredy Festival, Fairport Convention often performs in various line-ups of past and present members. Therefore, live albums which feature Thompson after he officially left the band are included here.

For a more detailed overview of Fairport Convention's releases, including compilations of existing material and singles from albums, see the Fairport Convention discography.

=== Studio albums ===
Year	Title	UK chart	Notes
1968	Fairport Convention	—	The 2003 CD reissue has four bonus tracks.
1968	What We Did on Our Holidays (Note: What We Did on Our Holidays was scheduled for release on 13 December 1968. Sources often cite the release date as January 1969, but it is not clear if this is because of a production or distribution delay or simply the record taking time to become known.)	—	The original US release was simply called Fairport Convention, as the self-titled debut had not been released there. The 2003 CD reissue has three bonus tracks.
1969	Unhalfbricking	12	The 2003 CD reissue has two bonus tracks
1969	Liege and Lief	17	The 2002 CD reissue has two recording session out-takes. The 2007 reissue has second CD of recording session out-takes and BBC sessions.
1970	Full House	13	The 2001 CD reissue is reordered and includes five bonus tracks

=== Live albums ===
Released	Title	Recorded	Notes
1976	Live at the L.A. Troubadour	1970	Eight tracks, including ‘Poor Will and the Jolly Hangman’ and ‘Sloth’
1982	Moat on the Ledge	1981	Reunion concert at Broughton Castle
1984	The Boot	1983	Official bootleg of the reunion concert at Home Farm, Cropredy
1986	House Full: Live at the L.A. Troubadour	1970	This has an alternative selection from the same Troubadour recordings as the 1976 release, adding "Sir Patrick Spens", "Staines Morris" and "Battle of the Somme", plus an alternative version of ‘Sloth’. The 2001 CD reissue combines most material from both releases.
1987	The Other Boot	1986	Official bootleg of the Cropredy reunion
1987	Heyday (BBC Radio Sessions)	1968 & 1969	The 2002 CD rerelease has an extra eight tracks
1988	The Third Leg	1987	Official bootleg of the Cropredy reunion
1993	25th Anniversary Concert	1992	Cropredy recording
1999	The Cropredy Box	1997	
2002	Cropredy 2002 - Another Gig : Another Palindrome	2002	Rereleased in 2003 as Festival: Cropredy 2002
2004	Cropredy Capers	1980-2004	
2007	Live at the BBC	1967-1974	This is a 4-CD set. There is also a truncated single-CD compilation (2008) derived from the larger compilation.
2018	What We Did On Our Saturday	2017	50th-anniversary concert at Cropredy
2020	Chicago 1970	1970	Recorded at Mandel Hall, University of Chicago, for radio broadcast
2023	Full House for Sale	2022	Live Cropredy performance of Full House with near original line up (Chris Leslie standing in for the late Dave Swarbrick)

=== Other material ===
Year	Title	Year relevant material recorded	Notes
1968	If I Had a Ribbon Bow	1967	Standalone single, now more easily found as a bonus track to the Fairport Convention self-titled debut album, with B-side "If (Stomp)" from the album
1970	Now Be Thankful	1970	This is a standalone single, with the B-side, "Sir B. McKenzie's Daughter's Lament for the 77th Mounted Lancers Retreat from the Straits of Loch Knombe, in the Year of Our Lord 1727, on the Occasion of the Announcement of Her Marriage to the Laird Of Kinleakie". Both tracks are now more easily found on the reissue of Full House.
1999	Meet on the Ledge: The Classic Years 1967–1975	1970	Includes a previously unreleased version of "The Bonny Bunch of Roses" from the Full House sessions, later added as a bonus track to the 2001 reissue of that album
2002	Fairport Unconventional	1967-2001	Mostly previously unreleased studio and live tracks, some featuring Thompson
2004	Angel Delight (Note: The 2004 rerelease of Angel Delight with the relevant bonus track did not chart, but on its initial release in 1971 the album reached no. 8 in the UK and no. 200 in the USA.)	1970	Whilst Thompson had left the band and did not play on this album, the 2004 CD reissue contains a bonus version of "The Journeyman's Grace" recorded for a BBC radio session in 1970 and featuring Thompson.
2017	Come All Ye: The First Ten Years	~1969-~1972	Compilation of existing and newly released archive material, some featuring Thompson

== Richard Thompson albums (solo, duo or as bandleader) ==
=== Studio albums ===
Year	Title	Credited to	Chart positions		Notes
Year	Title	Credited to	UK	US	Notes
1972	Henry the Human Fly	Richard Thompson	—	—	
1974	I Want to See the Bright Lights Tonight	Richard and Linda Thompson	—	—	The 2004 CD reissues include bonus live tracks from the respective eras.
1975	Hokey Pokey	Richard and Linda Thompson	—	—	The 2004 CD reissues include bonus live tracks from the respective eras.
1975	Pour Down Like Silver	Richard and Linda Thompson	—	—	The 2004 CD reissues include bonus live tracks from the respective eras.
1978	First Light	Richard and Linda Thompson	—	—	
1979	Sunnyvista	Richard and Linda Thompson	—	—	The 1992 CD reissue has a bonus track: the new version of "Georgie on a Spree" that was released as a single and used as the theme for the BBC's Kiss the Girls and Make Them Cry.
1981	Strict Tempo!	Richard Thompson	—	—	
1982	Shoot Out the Lights	Richard and Linda Thompson	—	—	The 1988 CD reissue includes B-side "Living in Luxury". The 2010 reissue includes a second disc of 11 unreleased live tracks that were recorded in the US in 1982.
1983	Hand of Kindness	Richard Thompson	—	186	Some versions (1986 onwards) add "Where the Wind Don't Whine" as a mid-album bonus track.
1985	Across a Crowded Room	Richard Thompson	80	102	Some editions include bonus track "Shine On Love" mid-album.
1986	Daring Adventures	Richard Thompson	92	142	The German limited-edition (also 1986) includes a bonus 7-inch with three live tracks.
1988	Amnesia	Richard Thompson	89	182	
1991	Rumor and Sigh	Richard Thompson	32	—	
1994	Mirror Blue	Richard Thompson	23	109	
1996	You? Me? Us?	Richard Thompson	32	97	
1997	Industry	Richard Thompson and Danny Thompson	69	—	
1999	Mock Tudor	Richard Thompson	28	—	A vinyl edition (also 1999) includes two bonus songs that are now more easily found on Action Packed.
2003	The Old Kit Bag	Richard Thompson	52	121	Some versions include bonus tracks from 1000 Years of Popular Music
2005	Front Parlour Ballads	Richard Thompson	54	197	
2007	Sweet Warrior	Richard Thompson	39	111	A Japanese CD edition (also 2007) has two bonus tracks: "Dust and Wine" and "Any Old Body".
2013	Electric	Richard Thompson	16	75	A 'Deluxe Edition' (also 2013) features four outtakes from the Electric sessions and three tracks from other albums.
2014	Acoustic Classics	Richard Thompson	16	103	
2015	Still	Richard Thompson	10	82	A 'Deluxe Edition' (also 2015) includes the Variations EP with five outtakes from the sessions.
2017	Acoustic Classics II	Richard Thompson	24	—	
2017	Acoustic Rarities	Richard Thompson	84	—	
2018	13 Rivers	Richard Thompson	18	—	
2024	Ship to Shore	Richard Thompson	46	—	A special vinyl edition comes with a bonus flexidisc with a demo of "Trust".
2026	Hippies, Thugs and Heroes	Richard Thompson	40	—	A special vinyl edition comes with a bonus flexidisc with a demo of "Cocaine Walking, Booze Talking"

=== Live albums ===
Released	Title	Credited to	Recorded	Chart positions		Notes
Released	Title	Credited to	Recorded	UK	US	
1984	Small Town Romance	Richard Thompson	1982	—	—	Some versions (1997 onwards) include three bonus tracks.
1995	Live at Crawley	Richard Thompson with Danny Thompson	1993	—	—	
1996	Two Letter Words: Live 1994	Richard Thompson Band	1994	—	—	
1998	Celtschmerz: Live in the UK ‘98	Richard Thompson	1998	—	—	
2002	Semi-Detached Mock Tudor	Richard Thompson Band	1999	—	—	
2003	More Guitar	Richard Thompson Band	1988	—	—	
2003	1000 Years of Popular Music	Richard Thompson	2002	—	—	See also the 2006 DVD and CD release in the DVD section of the same name with all new recordings.
2003	Ducknapped!	The Richard Thompson Band	2003	—	—	
2004	Faithless	Richard Thompson	1985	—	—	
2004	The Chrono Show	Richard Thompson	2004	—	—	
2005	Live from Austin, TX	Richard Thompson	2001	—	—	The 2024 double-vinyl reissue has an additional track, "Put It There Pal".
2007	In Concert, November 1975	Richard and Linda Thompson	1975	—	—	
2009	Live Warrior	Richard Thompson, Michael Jerome, Danny Thompson, Taras Prodaniuk, Pete Zorn (Note: Live Warrior is an album of recordings by the Richard Thompson Band performing Thompson's material. However, the front cover simply lists the band members, whereas the spine, back cover and digital listings credits it simply to 'Richard Thompson'.)	2007	—	—	
2010	Dream Attic	Richard Thompson	2010	20	83	Whilst containing all new material and marketed like a studio album, ''Dream Attic'' was actually recorded live. A deluxe edition (also 2010) has a second disc of Thompson's acoustic demo recordings of the album's songs.
2011	Live at the BBC	Richard Thompson featuring Linda Thompson	1973–2009	—	—	Three CDs and a DVD
2012	Cabaret of Souls	Richard Thompson	2009	—	—	
2017	Live at Rockpalast	Richard Thompson Band	1983 & 1984	—	—	3 CDs and 2 DVDs
2019	Across A Crowded Room Live at Barrymore's 1985	Richard Thompson	1985	—	—	2-CD release, featuring additional material not included on the original 1985 video (see below), and a revised running order.
2020	Live at Rock City, Nottingham, November 86	Richard Thompson	1986	—	—	
2021	Live from London	Richard Thompson	2021	—	—	
2022	Live from Honolulu	The Richard Thompson Acoustic Trio	2006	—	—	
2023	Historic Classic Concert - Live in Nottingham 1986	Richard Thompson Band	1985	—	—	Despite the title, this is thought to actually have been recorded in 1985.

=== Compilations ===
Year	Title	Credited to	Notes
1976	(guitar, vocal)	Richard Thompson	
1976	Live! (More or Less)	Richard Thompson	
1985	Doom & Gloom from the Tomb (Vol. 1)	Richard Thompson	
1991	Doom & Gloom II (Over My Dead Body)	Richard Thompson	
1993	Watching the Dark	Richard Thompson	
2000	The Best of Richard & Linda Thompson: The Island Records Years	Richard and Linda Thompson	Also issued under the title The End of the Rainbow: An Introduction to Richard & Linda Thompson.
2001	Action Packed	Richard Thompson	Two alternative versions with second CDs of three bonus live tracks each were released in the US.
2005	Some Enchanted Evenings	Richard Thompson	
2006	RT- The Life and Music of Richard Thompson	Richard Thompson	The ordinary box contains five CDs. The initial run also came with a sixth bonus CD, RT on FR.
2009	Walking on a Wire	Richard Thompson	
2020	Hard Luck Stories (1972–1982)	Richard and Linda Thompson	

== Richard Thompson singles ==
=== With Linda Thompson ===
Year	Song	Album	Notes
1974	"I Want to See the Bright Lights Tonight"	I Want to See the Bright Lights Tonight	B-side: "When I Get to the Border"
1975	"Hokey Pokey"	Hokey Pokey	B-side: "I’ll Regret It All in the Morning"
1978	"Don't Let a Thief Steal into Your Heart"	First Light	B-side: "First Light"
1979	"Georgie on a Spree" / "Civilisation"	Sunnyvista	Double A-side
1982	"Don't Renege On Our Love"	Shoot Out the Lights	B-side: "Living in Luxury"

=== Solo ===
Year	Song	Album	Notes
1983	"The Wrong Heartbeat"	Hand of Kindness	B-side: "Devonside" (non-album track)
1984	"Tear-Stained Letter"	Hand of Kindness	B-side: "Where the Wind Don't Whine"
1985	"When the Spell is Broken"	Across a Crowded Room	
1985	"You Don't Say"	Across a Crowded Room	B-side: "When the Spell is Broken" (recorded at Park West, Chicago in 1985)
1986	"Valerie"	Daring Adventures	
1986	"Nearly in Love"	Daring Adventures	
1988	"Turning of the Tide"	Amnesia	B-side: "Pharaoh"
1989	"Reckless Kind"	Amnesia	B-side: "Turning of the Tide" (live)
1991	"I Feel So Good"	Rumor and Sigh	B-sides: "Harry's Theme" and "Backlash Love Affair"
1991	"Read About Love"	Rumor and Sigh	B-side: "I Feel So Good" (solo)
1992	"I Misunderstood"	Rumor and Sigh	Official Dutch Tour Single
1994	"I Can't Wake Up to Save My Life"	Mirror Blue	B-side: "Easy There, Steady Now"
1994	"Easy There, Steady Now"	Mirror Blue	
1996	"Dark Hand over My Heart"	You? Me? Us?	
1999	"Crawl Back (under My Stone)"	Mock Tudor	B-side: "Bathsheba Smiles"
2003	"She Said It Was Destiny"	The Old Kit Bag	
2007	"Dad's Gonna Kill Me"	Sweet Warrior	
2012	"Haul Me Up"	—	Record Store Day 2012 single featuring live versions of ‘Haul Me Up’ (RT Band) and ‘1952 Vincent Black Lightning’ (solo).
2013	"Good Things Happen to Bad People"	Electric	
2013	"Salford Sunday"	Electric	
2017	"Gethsemane"	Acoustic Classics II	
2018	"Bones of Gilead"	13 Rivers	
2018	"The Storm Won't Come"	13 Rivers	
2018	"My Rock, My Rope"	13 Rivers	
2022	"Streamwalk / Treadwell No More"	Music from Grizzly Man	
2022	"Glencoe"	Music from Grizzly Man	
2024	"Singapore Sadie"	Ship to Shore	
2024	"Freeze"	Ship to Shore	
2026	"Cocaine Walking, Booze Talking"	Hippies, Thugs and Heroes	
2026	"Sorcerer's Apprentice"	Hippies, Thugs and Heroes	

=== With the Richard Thompson Acoustic Trio ===
Year	Song	Album
2022	"(I Want to See) The Bright Lights Tonight"	Live from Honolulu

=== With Hugh Cornwell ===
Year	Song	Album
2025	"Tobacco Road"	Think Loud 4 Parkinson's

== Solo EPs ==
Year	Title	Notes
2003	Tracks	Limited-edition 5-track CD featuring existing recordings and unreleased '1000 Years of Popular Music' live tracks.
2020	Bloody Noses	6-track acoustic EPs written and recorded at home during pandemic lockdowns, later combined onto one CD.
2021	Serpent's Tears	6-track acoustic EPs written and recorded at home during pandemic lockdowns, later combined onto one CD.

== Soundtracks ==
Not listed here are soundtrack albums on which a Richard Thompson recording or composition is merely included, without further involvement from Thompson. Listed here are soundtracks in which Thompson had a significant creative role in creating new music.

Year	Title	Credited to
1987	The Marksman (Music from the BBC TV Series)	Richard Thompson and Peter Filleul
1989	Hard Cash	Richard Thompson, Clive Gregson & Christine Collister, Ron Kavana, Martin Carthy, Dave Kelly, Jo Ann Kelly, June Tabor, The Watersons, Keith Hancock, Dave Kelly & Hilary Fletcher and Michael Marra. (Note: Hard Cash was developed and co-produced by Richard Thompson and Peter Filleul for a BBC documentary; Thompson is the lead performer of two songs, wrote three and plays on ten.)
1991	Sweet Talker	Richard Thompson
2005	Grizzly Man (Note: The Grizzly Man soundtrack album was rereleased in 2022 as Music of Grizzly Man.)	Richard Thompson
2010	Baraboo: Motion Picture Soundtrack	Joel Savoy, Emma Beaton & Chris Stafford, additional compositions by Richard Thompson, metal compositions by Riley Sweeney Lynch and Dean Hurley, and Edison recordings from the early 20th century
2019	The Cold Blue (Original Motion Picture Score)	Music by Richard Thompson (Note: The Cold Blue soundtrack is primarily Thompson's compositions played by a chamber orchestra. No musician credits are given but it appears Thompson plays only on the last two tracks, which are 'guitar versions' of pieces earlier on the album.)

== Collaborations ==
Recordings on which Thompson has guested or worked as a session musician are not shown here (see sections below). Listed here are recordings on which Thompson played a significant creative role as a member of the group or project.

Year	Title	Credited to
1971	No Roses	Shirley Collins and the Albion Country Band
1972	Morris On	Ashley Hutchings • Richard Thompson • Dave Mattacks • John Kirkpatrick • Barry Dransfield
1972	Rock On	The Bunch
1981	Saturday Rolling Around	The GPs
1987	Live, Love, Larf & Loaf	French Frith Kaiser Thompson
1990	Invisible Means	French Frith Kaiser Thompson
2014	Family	Thompson
2020	#StandByMe (2020)	Whispering Bob's All-Stars (Note: #StandByMe (2020) is digital single put together by Whispering Bob Harris during the COVID-19 pandemic, with 55 acts remotely collaborating to cover Ben E. King's Stand by Me. Thompson sings and plays electric guitar.)
2025	In 1981 There Was… The GPs – Live In Concert (Note: In 1981 There Was… The GPs is a mix of remastered material from Saturday Rolling Around and newly released archive tracks.)	The GPs

== As a featured guest ==
Albums in which Thompson is credited on the front cover as a featured guest (rather than simply in the notes of the musicians playing) are covered here.

Year	Title	Credited to
1983	Variations on a Theme	David Thomas & the Pedestrians with Richard Thompson
1986	An Hour with Cecil Sharp and Ashley Hutchings	Ashley Hutchings with guests Martin Carthy ○ Richard Thompson ○ Dave Whetstone
1994	Twangin' n' A-Traddin'	The Ashley Hutchings Big Beat Combo with special guest Richard Thompson
1998	The Bones of All Men	Mr Philip Pickett with Mr Richard Thompson and the Fairport Rhythm Section
2023	Child Ballads: The Final Six	The London Experimental Ensemble with Richard Thompson, Wesley Stace, Sivert Høyem, Marissa Nadler and Gina Fergione

== Original recordings on 'various artist' compilations ==
Original recordings of new or existing compositions on 'various artist' compilations. Only the first release the recording is on is listed.

Year	Album	Song or tune	Notes
1975	Over The Rainbow (The Last Concert, Live!)	"Hokey Pokey"	Live recording with Linda Thompson from 1975
1985	Feed the Folk	"Old Horse"	With Martin Carthy, John Kirkpatrick and Howard Evans, alternative take to the one on Carthy's Out of the Cut, now more easily found on Carthy Chronicles
1989	Ben & Jerry's Newport Folk Festival 1988	"Turning of the Tide"	Live recording from the festival
1989	Time Between – A Tribute to The Byrds	"Here Without You"	With Clive Gregson and Christine Collister
1990	Ben & Jerry's Newport Folk Festival 1988, Vol. 2: Mementos	"Two Left Feet" and "The Choice Wife"	Live recording from the festival
1990	Circle Dance—The Hokey Pokey Charity Compilation	"The May Day Psalter"	With Danny Thompson. Now more easily available on Danny Thompson's Connected compilation.
1991	The Best of Mountain Stage, Volume One	"Shoot Out the Lights"	Live solo version for the radio programme
1991	Bringing It All Back Home, Music From The BBC TV Series	"The Dimming of the Day"	With Mary Black
1991	Turn of the Decade 1989–90: Ben & Jerry's Newport Folk Festival	"She Moves Through The Fair"	Live from the festival
1991	All Through the Year — A Calendar in Music & Song	"Late November"	With Fairport Convention, Vikki Clayton and Jerry Donahue, live at Cropredy 1991
1992	Studio Brussel: Update Live	"Misunderstood"	Live radio session
1993	Tanz & Folkfest Rudolstadt '92	"Read About Love"	Live from the festival
1993	The World is a Wonderful Place	"The World is a Wonderful Place"	With Linda Thompson, previously unreleased, unlisted track 13
1993	KBCO: The Best of Studio C, Volume 3	"1952 Vincent Black Lightning"	Live radio session from 1992
1994	In Their Own Words, Vol 1	"I Feel So Good"	Live, solo radio session from 1992
1994	ONXRT: Live From The Archives, Volume 2	"I Can't Wake up to Save My Life"	Live radio session from 1994
1994	Broadcasts Vol. 2	"Dimming of the Day"	Live radio session on KGSR from 1994
1994	Where Are My Headphones? Live From Studio A, Volume 2	"Taking My Business Elsewhere"	Live, solo radio session on WCBE
1995	Troubadours of British Folk, Volume 3: An Evolving Tradition	"1952 Vincent Black Lightning"	Live version only previously available on a promotional EP for "I Misunderstood"
1995	Live at the World Cafe, Vol. 1	"Beeswing"	Live radio session from 1992
1995	89.7 FM WNKU Presents Natural Alternatives	"King of Bohemia"	Live radio session
1995	KFOG Radio 104.5/97.7, Live From The Archives II	"I Feel So Good"	Live from the Sausalito Art Festival, 1994
1997	Folk, Live from Mountain Stage	"Beat the Retreat"	Live radio session
1997	Live at the Iron Horse, Volume 1	"From Galway to Graceland"	Live, solo radio session from 1990
1997	E‑Town Live	"1952 Vincent Black Lightning"	Live radio session in Boulder, Colorado from 1996
1997	Georgia on Our Mind	"Georgia on My Mind" and "John the Gun"	The first as part of the Deep Sea Ensemble, the second with the Richard Thompson Band, live in 1985
1998	Where Have All the Flowers Gone?: The Songs of Pete Seeger, Vol 1	"If I Had a Hammer"	With Nanci Griffith and friends, vocals
1998	From the Heart of Studio A: The Folkscene Collection	"Waltzing's for Dreamers"	Live radio session for Roz and Howard Larman's 'FolkScene' on KPFK in Los Angeles
1999	Bringing It All Back Home, Volume 2	"Waltzing's For Dreamers"	With Mary Black and Dolores Keane
1999	Other Enz: Split Enz & Beyond	"Persuasion"	With Tim Finn
2000	Live At The World Cafe, Vol. 10	"Cooksferry Queen"	Live radio session
2000	Heart of England: In Aid of Teenage Cancer Trust	"I Want to See the Bright Lights Tonight"	Live
2000	The Riversound Cafe	"Sights and Sounds of London Town"	Live radio session recorded live at WRSI
2000	Mixx On The Fly – Live From Studio A – WCBE Vol. 7	"Uninhabited Man"	Live radio session
2000	Broadcasts, Vol. 8	"Sights and Sounds of London Town"	Live radio session on KGSR
2001	Philadelphia Folk Festival: 40th Anniversary	"Walk Awhile" and "Beeswing"	Live from previous festivals. Former with Fairport Convention, 1970
2001	Live At The Night, Vol. 1	"Crawl Back"	Live radio session from 2000
2002	Evangeline Made: A Tribute to Cajun Music	"La Chanson D'Une Fille De Quinze Ans" and "Les Flammes D'Enfer"	Former with Ann Savoy, latter solo
2002	156 Strings: Nineteen Totally Original Acoustic Guitarists	"How Does Your Garden Grow?"	Solo, for compilation curated by Henry Kaiser
2002	Heart of England, Volume 2: In Aid of Teenage Cancer Trust	"Sights and Sounds of London Town"	Live from Hampstead
2002	Shining Bright: The Songs of Lal & Mike Waterson	"Red Wine Promises"	Cover of Lal Waterson song
2002	Live at the World Cafe, Vol. 14: The Next Decade	"Persuasion"	Live radio session
2003	Crossing Jordan [soundtrack]	"Season of the Witch"	Donovan cover for TV soundtrack
2003	Live @ The World Café, Vol. 17: Three Flights Up	"I'll Tag Along"	Live radio session
2003	City Folk Live VI	"She Said It Was Destiny"	Live radio session
2003	Live From The CD101 Big Room – Volume 1	"1952 Vincent Black Lightning"	Live radio session
2004	WYEP Live & Direct: Three Decades, Three Discs	"She Said It Was Destiny"	Live radio session
2005	The Bootlegs (Vol. 1 Celebrating 35 Years at First Avenue)	"Cooksferry Queen"	Live radio session from 1999
2006	The Harry Smith Project: Anthology of American Folk Music Revisited	"The Coo Coo Bird"	With Eliza Carthy, live in Los Angeles, 2001
2006	Live At The World Cafe, Vol. 21: In The Cards	"The Hots for the Smarts"	Live radio session from 2005
2006	Jan Donkers – Mijn Muziek	"From Galway to Graceland"	Live in Vlissingen, Netherlands, 2001
2006	Rogue's Gallery: Pirate Ballads, Sea Songs, and Chanteys	"Mingulay Boat Song"	Cover of a song by Sir Hugh S. Roberton
2007	Cool as Folk	"Tear Stained Letter"	The Richard Thompson Band, live at Cambridge Folk Festival, 2001
2007	KFOG Radio 104.5\97.7: Live From The Archives 14	"1952 Vincent Black Lightning"	Live radio session from 2005
2007	Het Beste Van 25 Jaar Marktrock	"I Feel So Good"	Live from the Marktrock festival, probably from 1995
2007	Music & Rhythm: WOMAD Worldwide 1982–2007	"Easy There, Steady Now"	Live from WOMAD, New Zealand in 1997
2013	Son of Rogues Gallery: Pirate Ballads, Sea Songs & Chanteys	"General Taylor"	With Jack Shit (aka Johnny Depp)
2013	The Beautiful Old Turn-Of-The-Century	"The Band Played On"	With Christine Collister and Garth Hudson
2013	Sing Me the Songs: Celebrating the Works of Kate McGarrigle	"Go Leave"	With Linda Thompson, live cover from London, 2010
2013	Live at the World Cafe, Vol. 36	"Good things happen to bad people"	Live radio session
2014	The 78 Project: Volume 1	"The Coo Coo Bird"	Recorded using a 1930s Presto direct‑to‑disc recorder in New York City in 2012
2014	Cambridge Folk Festival (Celebrating 50 Years)	"1952 Vincent Black Lightning"	Live, solo recording from the 2011 festival
2017	Live At The World Cafe, Vol. 41: 25th Anniversary Edition	"1952 Vincent Black Lightning"	Live radio session from 2005
2017	Sincerely, L. Cohen: A Live Celebration of Leonard Cohen	"Bird on the Wire" and "Story of Isaac"	Recorded live in Williamsburg, Brooklyn
2019	Jan Douwe Kroeske Presents the Best of 2 Meter Sessions, 1987–2009	"I Feel So Good"	Live solo version
2019	Jan Douwe Kroeske Presents 2 Meter Sessions, Volume 3	"I Misunderstood"	
2019	Vision & Revision: The First 80 Years of Topic Records	"The Light Bob’s Lassie"	Solo performance of traditional song
2019	If You're Going to the City: A Tribute to Mose Allison	"Parchman Farm"	Live cover, with George Galt
2023	Heal the Sky	"Lament for Mariupol"	Guitar instrumental
2024	Proxy Music	"I Used to Be So Pretty" and "Those Damn Roches"	With Ren Harvieu on "I Used to Be So Pretty" and Teddy Thompson on "Those Damn Roches", from an album of various artists performing songs written by Linda Thompson
2025	Think Loud 4 Parkinson's	"Tobacco Road" and "Meet on the Ledge"	With Hugh Cornwell on "Tobacco Road" and as part of Fairport's Cropredy 20 on "Meet on the Ledge". Fairport's Cropredy 20 is a group of 20 musicians, led by Fairport Convention, that came together remotely in 2020 to record this song.
2025	Sweet Relief – We Can Help!	"Humpy Back Man"	New original Thompson song for charity compilation

== Original recordings on career-spanning compilations ==
These are compilations dedicated to a single musician but featuring their work with several bands and featured artists from across their career. Only releases with newly released material are covered.

Year	Title	Featured musician	Song or tune	Notes
1994	The Guv'nor vol 1	Ashley Hutchings	"Some Sweet Day", "You're Gonna Need My Help" and "Dear Landlord"	As a member of Fairport Convention, recorded 1967–1969
1995	The Guv'nor vol 2	Ashley Hutchings	"You Never Wanted Me" and "Sir Patrick Spens"	As a member of Fairport Convention, recorded 1968
1995	The Guv'nor vol 3	Ashley Hutchings	"Night in the City" and "Marcie"	As a member of Fairport Convention, recorded 1968
1996	The Guv'nor vol 4	Ashley Hutchings	"Both Sides Now" and "Fotheringay"	As a member of Fairport Convention, recorded 1967–1969
2003	Swarb!: A Celebration of the Life and Music of Dave Swarbrick	Dave Swarbrick	various	Various tracks with Fairport Convention from 1970 onwards, "Sword Dance / Black Cow" with Fairport Convention and Linda Thompson from 1981
2007	A Box of Pegg's	Dave Pegg	"Let It Blow"	With Fairport Convention, live at Cropredy, 2005
2010	Sandy Denny [box set]	Sandy Denny	various	Thompson features on newly released material dating back to sessions with Fairport in 1968
2015	Gathering The Threads	Judy Dyble	improvisation	An improvisation recorded with Judy Dyble in 1966 (Note: The improvisation between Judy Dyble and Thompson is dated 1964 on Dyble’s Bandcamp page, but other sources date it to 1966. In 1964, both Dyble and Thompson were about 15 and Fairport Convention did not exist, making 1966 a more credible date for this recording.). Also available, in a longer version, on Anthology: Pt. One.

== Original recordings on not-for-sale releases ==
Original recordings of new or existing compositions on albums that are not directly for sale (for example, promotional items for radio play, or albums accompanying a book or magazine). Only recordings which do not also appear on an official release are included.

Year	Release	Song or tune	Notes
1991	I Misunderstood	"1952 Vincent Black Lightning" and "Now That I’m Dead"	Five live songs were released with the US promotional EP of I Misunderstood, of which these two were not apparently released elsewhere
1992	Ferrington Guitars	"The Job of Journey Work"	Instrumental, from the CD with the book 'Ferrington Guitars'
1996	Launch Live	"The Razor Dance"	Recorded live for Launch disc magazine; from a limited run audio CD containing live tracks from Launch's first ten issues
1999	Rykodisc 15th Anniversary Acoustic Cafe Sampler	"Lotteryland"	Recorded live at the Acoustic Cafe
1999	Selected Tracks Live at Mountain Stage	"Bathsheba Smiles", "The Ghost of You Walks" and "Valerie"	Promo only CD release to support the release of Mock Tudor
2000	Fish Out of Water: Music Outside The Mainstream	"Waltzing's for Dreamers"	With Cry Cry Cry, live performance; CD only available via pledges to the radio station WMNF
2011	Oasis Acoustic, Volume 39	"Hide It Away"	Live, Oasis exclusive
2021	Dylan Revisited	"This Wheel's on Fire"	With Zara Phillips on backing vocals, album with Uncut magazine in the UK

== As a guest or session musician ==
All are long-playing albums unless otherwise stated.

Year	Title	Artist	Notes	Chart positions	
	Title	Artist	Notes	UK	US
1968	The Hangman's Beautiful Daughter	The Incredible String Band	Uncredited vocals on "The Minotaur's Song"	5	161
1969	Marc Ellington	Marc Ellington	Guitar	—	—
1969	Five Leaves Left	Nick Drake	Overdubbed electric guitar on "Time Has Told Me"	—	—
1969	Love Chronicles	Al Stewart	Guitar, under pseudonym Marvyn Prestwick	—	—
1969	If You Want It	The Magic Christians	Single, promptly reissued with the corrected title Come and Get It. Thompson is uncredited but there is suggestion he plays electric guitar.	—	—
1970	Matthews' Southern Comfort	Matthews' Southern Comfort	Thompson plays guitar. Although titled simply Matthews' Southern Comfort on the cover, it is generally regarded as a solo Iain Matthews album rather than part of the later Matthews Southern Comfort discography.	—	—
1970	Strange Fruit	Gary Farr	Lead guitar	—	—
1971	Bryter Layter	Nick Drake	Electric guitar on "Hazey Jane II"	—	—
1971	Smiling Men with Bad Reputations	Mike Heron	Guitar on "Flowers of the Forest"	—	—
1971	If You Saw Thro' My Eyes	Iain Matthews	Electric and acoustic guitar, accordion	—	—
1971	Rains/Reins of Changes	Marc Ellington	Electric guitar and backing vocals	—	—
1971	Stargazer	Shelagh McDonald	Guitar on "Baby Go Slow"	—	—
1971	Street Singer	Mick Softley	Electric guitar	—	—
1971	The North Star Grassman and the Ravens	Sandy Denny	Electric guitar and acoustic guitars, bass, accordion, vocals	—	—
1971	Bless the Weather	John Martyn	Guitar	—	—
1971	4th English Album	Françoise Hardy		—	—
1971	Those Pleasant Days	Stefan Grossman	Electric guitar	—	—
1972	Tigers Will Survive	Iain Matthews	Guitar	—	—
1972	Jump at the Sun	John Kirkpatrick	12-string guitar on "The Widow of Westmorland’s Daughter", under pseudonym Agnes Mirren	—	—
1972	Bright Phoebus	Lal and Mike Waterson	Guitar on all tracks except 'Red Wine & Promises'	—	—
1972	Sandy	Sandy Denny	Electric and acoustic guitars, mandolin	—	—
1973	Rosie	Fairport Convention	Electric and 12-string guitars on the track 'Rosie'	—	—
1973	Solid Air	John Martyn	Mandolin on 'Over the Hill'	88 (Note: The original release of John Martyn's Solid Air did not chart, but a 2009 rerelease reached no. 88.)	—
1973	Urban Cowboy	Andy Roberts	Lead electric guitar on "Elaine"	—	—
1974	Like an Old Fashioned Waltz	Sandy Denny	Electric guitar on "Solo" and "No End"	—	197
1974	Fear	John Cale	Slide guitar on "Momamma Scuba"	—	—
1975	Is Having a Wonderful Time	Geoff Muldaur	Lead guitar on "Tennessee Blues"	—	—
1975	Marc Time	Marc Ellington	Backing vocals	—	—
1975	Fantasies From a Corner Seat	Harvey Andrews & Graham Cooper	Acoustic & electric guitar, mandolin & backing vocals on "Targets"	—	—
1975	Mike Heron's Reputation	Mike Heron	Electric guitar on "Down On My Knees (After Memphis)"	—	—
1976	Vanishing Trick: Poems And Songs	Brian Patten	Guitar on "Embroidered Butterflies" and "After Frost"	—	—
1977	Rendezvous	Sandy Denny	Electric guitar on "Candle in the Wind"	—	—
1978	Rise Up Like the Sun	The Albion Band	Backing vocals on "Poor Old Horse" and "Lay Me Low"	—	—
1978	Julie Covington	Julie Covington	Guitar and backing vocals	—	—
1979	Slide Away the Screen	Ralph McTell	Guitar on "Harry (Don’t Go)", "Promises" and "Save the Last Dance for Me"	—	—
1980	Night Owl	Gerry Rafferty	Mandolin on 'Why Won't You Talk to Me?', guitar on 'Family Tree' and 'Already Gone'	9	29
1981	Teddy Boys Don't Knit	Vivian Stanshall	Guitar	—	—
1981	Smiddyburn	Dave Swarbrick	Guitar, mandolin and mandocello	—	—
1981	Thunderin' On The Horizon	Arizona Smoke Revue	Guitar on "Border Song"	—	—
1981	Voices	Murray Head	Electric guitar on "Old Soho"	—	—
1981	The Sound of the Sand and Other Songs of the Pedestrian	David Thomas & the Pedestrians	Guitar and dulcimer	—	—
1982	Water of Dreams	Ralph McTell	Lead guitar on “I’m Not a Rock” and “I Want You”	—	—
1982	Out of the Cut	Martin Carthy	Guitar on "Old Horse"	—	—
1983	Fame and Wealth	Loudon Wainwright III	Electric guitar and mandolin on "Reader And Advisor" and acoustic guitar on "April Fools Day Morn"	—	—
1983	Any Trouble	Any Trouble	Electric guitar on "Falling In Love With You Again"	—	—
1983	Flittin'	Dave Swarbrick	Guitar, mandolin and mandocello on several tracks	—	—
1983	8	JJ Cale	Guitars	47	—
1983	Proof Through the Night	T Bone Burnett	Guitar and mandolin on "Shut It Tight"	—	—
1984	Behind the Trap Door	T Bone Burnett		—	—
1984	Wrong End of the Race	Any Trouble	Guitar on "Open Fire", "Lucky Day" and "Like a Man", vocals on "Baby Now That I've Found You"	—	—
1985	Gladys' Leap	Fairport Convention	Lead electric guitar on "Head in a Sack"	—	—
1985	I'm Alright	Loudon Wainwright III	Guitar and mandolin	—	—
1985	Rackbag	Folk och Rackare	Electric guitar on "Liten Kersti Stalldräng"	—	—
1985	Visions of Excess	The Golden Palominos	Electric guitar on "Boy (Go)", "Silver Bullet", "(Kind of) True" and "Buenos Aires"	—	—
1986	Electric Bluebirds	Electric Bluebirds	Guitar	—	—
1986	Supply and Demand	Dagmar Krause	Guitar and banjo	—	—
1986	More Love Songs	Loudon Wainwright III	Guitar, mandolin and vocals	—	—
1986	Expletive Delighted!	Fairport Convention	Guitar on "Hanks for the Memory"	—	—
1986	Raptures of the Deep	The Deep Sea Jivers	Guitar on "Deep Sea Jiving", "Night Train" and "(Do the) Wapping Hop"	—	—
1987	Bridge of Sighs	Ralph McTell	Lead guitar on "The Girl from the Hiring Fair" and "Bridge of Sighs"	—	—
1987	As Real as Disneyland	Julian Dawson and the Flood	Electric and acoustic guitar	—	—
1987	Time of No Reply	Nick Drake	A compilation of previously unreleased tracks. Thompson plays electric guitar on a version of "The Thoughts of Mary Jane" recorded in 1968, now more easily found on Made to Love Magic.	—	—
1987	Slam Dance (Original Motion Picture Soundtrack)	Mitchell Froom and various artists (Note: The Slam Dance soundtrack mixes an original score by Mitchell Froom (with Thompson playing on one track) with older recordings by various artists)	Guitar on "A Prayer for Miss Velveteen"	—	—
1987	Blue Balloon	John Kirkpatrick	Electric and acoustic guitars	—	—
1987	Studio Romantic	Saeko Suzuki	Electric guitar on "TV Dinner"	—	—
1988	The Auld Folks on the Wa’ and other Bothy Ballads	Charlie Allan	Mandolin	—	—
1988	Temple of Low Men	Crowded House	Electric guitar solo on "Sister Madly"	—	40
1988	Hot Cajun Rhythm ’n’ Blues	Michael Doucet and Cajun Brew	Electric guitar on "Wooly Bully", "Bayou Pom Pom" and "Woman or a Man"	—	—
1989	Maria McKee	Maria McKee	Electric guitar	49	120
1989	Therapy	Loudon Wainwright III	Electric guitar on “Your Mother and I”	—	—
1989	Surprise	Syd Straw	Electric guitar on “Heart of Darkness” and “Golden Dreams”	—	—
1991	Cajun Conja	BeauSoleil	Electric guitar on "Conja (New Orleans 1786)" and "Sur Le Pont De Lyon"	—	—
1991	Drunk with Passion	The Golden Palominos	Guitar on five tracks	—	—
1991	Luck of the Draw	Bonnie Raitt	Electric guitar on "Not the Only One"	38	2
1991	Hope You Like Our New Direction	Henry Kaiser	Acoustic guitar on "Kanaka Wai Wai" and "Annihilation in Allah", plus vocals on the latter	—	—
1991	Places I Have Never Been	Willie Nile	Electric guitar and backing vocals on ‘Café Memphis’, electric guitar on ‘Children of Paradise’, acoustic guitar on ‘That’s Enough for Me’	—	—
1992	99.9F°	Suzanne Vega	Guitar solo on 'As Girls Go’	20	86
1992	Be Headed	Chris Harford and the First Rays of the New Rising Sun	Acoustic guitar on "You Know Me the Best"	—	—
1992	Fat City	Shawn Colvin	Electric guitar on "Tennessee"	—	142
1992	His Master's Choice – The Songs Of Richard Thompson	Dave Burland	Guitar on five tracks	—	—
1992	The Hunter	Jennifer Warnes	Electric guitar on "Lights of Lousianne"	—	—
1993	The Assassin's Apprentice	Stephen Fearing	Electric guitar on "Down to the Wire"	—	—
1993	Fate of Nations	Robert Plant	Guitar on "Come Into My Life"	6	34
1993	Orphans & Outcasts, Volume 2: 1981–1989	Iain Matthews	On eight tracks of 1981–1989 demos, working references and outtakes	—	—
1994	Amplified Heart	Everything but the Girl	Lead electric guitar on "25th December"	20	46
1994	Cut and Run	Danny Carnahan and Robin Petrie	Electric guitar on "Cut and Run", "Girls in Black" and "Laughing in the Dark"	—	—
1994	Longing in Their Hearts	Bonnie Raitt	Second acoustic guitar on "Dimming of the Day"	26	1
1995	Camouflage	Iain Matthews		—	—
1996	Dreams Fly Away: A History of Linda Thompson	Linda Thompson	Richard Thompson plays on five previously unreleased tracks from their duo era	—	—
1996	Baptist Hospital	Boo Hewerdine	Guitar on "World’s End", "Holy Water" and "Greedy"	—	—
1996	Blue Aconite	Christine Collister	Guitar on "How Far the Horizon?", "Paper Wings" and "Midnight Feast"	—	—
1996	Norma Waterson	Norma Waterson	Acoustic and electric guitars	—	—
1997	Move Over Darling	Julian Dawson	Acoustic and electric guitars	—	—
1997	Who Knows Where the Time Goes?	Fairport Convention	Vocals on "I Heard It Through The Grapevine", live from Cropredy 1995	—	—
1997	L'Amour Ou La Folie	BeauSoleil	Electric guitar on “L’Amour Ou La Folie” and acoustic guitar on “Charivari”	—	—
1998	Other Voices, Too (A Trip Back to Bountiful)	Nanci Griffith	Electric guitar on "You Were on My Mind" and "Desperados Waiting for a Train"	—	—
1998	The Dark Gift of Time	Christine Collister	Electric guitar on "The Whole Night Sky"	—	—
1999	Memory of the Future	Eric Andersen	Electric guitar on "Sudden Love", "Chinatown" and "Hills of Tuscany"	—	—
1999	Spark	Julian Dawson	Electric guitar on "Two Shots of Jealousy"	—	—
1999	Orphans and Outcasts Volume 3	Iain Matthews		—	—
1999	The Very Thought of You	Norma Waterson	Acoustic and electric guitar, mandolin, hurdy‑gurdy and backing vocals	—	—
2000	Long Expectant Comes At Last	Cathal McConnell	Lap steel guitar, guitar and vocals	—	—
2000	Teddy Thompson	Teddy Thompson	Guitar on 5 tracks	—	—
2001	Give Me a Sad Song	Linda Thompson	Richard Thompson plays guitar and bass on a previously unreleased song "Restless Boy", as well as contributing to previously released material	—	—
2001	Mazurka Berzerker	John Kirkpatrick	Electric guitar on "The Dance of the Jews / Lebedik un Freylekh"	—	—
2002	Fashionably Late	Linda Thompson	Electric guitar and vocals on "Dear Mary"	—	—
2002	Spremenite Protokol	Andrej Sifrer	Guitar on four tracks	—	—
2003	12 Arrows	Judith Owen	Acoustic guitar and vocals on “Poseidon”	—	—
2003	Go Tell It on the Mountain	The Blind Boys of Alabama	Electric guitar on “In the Bleak Midwinter”	—	164
2003	So Damn Happy	Loudon Wainwright III	Guitar on “The Home Stretch”	—	—
2004	The Common Stone	Bob Davenport	Thompson gives two solo acoustic guitar performances (without Davenport's involvement) entitled “Davenport’s Cakewalk” and “Davenport’s Retreat"	—	—
2004	The Ride	Los Lobos	Guitar and vocals on “Wreck of the Carlos Rey”	—	75
2005	Always	June Tabor	Thompson plays guitar on his song "Mrs Rita" from the BBC Radio 1 documentary The Last Shift, a different recording to that on Hard Cash	—	—
2005	Lost and Found	Judith Owen	Acoustic guitar and backing vocals on “Night and Day”	—	—
2005	Separate Ways	Teddy Thompson	Guitar on five tracks	—	—
2006	Nothing Like a Dame	Julian Dawson	Electric guitar on "Move Over Darling"	—	—
2007	Crazy Hair Day	Barney Saltzberg	Vocals on "Song for Pete"	—	—
2007	Let Us Now Praise Sleepy John	Peter Case	Guitar and vocal on “Every 24 Hours”	—	—
2007	Release the Stars	Rufus Wainwright	Acoustic guitar on "Tiergarten", electric guitar on "Going to a Town" and "Between My Legs"	2	23
2007	South of Delia	Richard Shindell	Guitar on "The Humpback Whale" and "Texas Rangers"	—	—
2007	Strange Weirdos	Loudon Wainwright III	Electric guitar on "Grey in L.A.", "Final Frontier" and "Lullaby"	—	—
2007	Happy This Way	Judith Owen	Acoustic guitar and vocals on "Nicholas Drake"	—	—
2007	Upfront & Down Low	Teddy Thompson	Guitar on "Walking the Floor Over You", "Down Low" and "You Finally Said Something Good (When You Said Goodbye)"	—	—
2007	Rewind: Unreleased Recordings	JJ Cale	Recorded between 1971 and 1993. Thompson plays guitar on 'Seven Day Woman'.	—	—
2008	Visions	Hans Theessink and Terry Evans	Electric guitar on "Mother Earth" and "You Can't Judge a Book by the Cover"	—	—
2008	A Piece of What You Need	Teddy Thompson	Guitar on "Don’t Know What I Was Thinking", "Slippery Slope (Easier)" and (as a bonus track on some versions) "Christmas"	10	—
2011	Bella	Teddy Thompson	Guitar	42	—
2011	Purpose and Grace	Martin Simpson	Electric guitar on "The Sheffield Apprentice", "Brothers Under the Bridge" and "Little Liza Jane"	—	—
2011	Just Me and You	Emitt Rhodes	Single. Thompson plays lead guitar.	—	—
2011	This Wall Between Us	Emitt Rhodes	Single, different version to that on the album Rainbow Ends. Thompson plays lead guitar.	—	—
2011	What's a Man to Do	Emitt Rhodes	Single, different version to that on the album Rainbow Ends. Thompson plays lead guitar.	—	—
2012	20	Kate Rusby	Electric guitar and vocals on "Who Will Sing Me Lullabies"	22	—
2012	Find the One	The Coal Porters	Guitar on "Hush U Babe / Burnham Thorpe"	—	—
2012	Marvin Country!	Marvin Etzioni	Vocals on "It Don't Cost Much", which he co-wrote with Etzioni	—	—
2013	Won't Be Long Now	Linda Thompson	Acoustic guitar on "Love's for Babies and Fools"	76	—
2014	Tell 'Em I'm Gone	Yusuf	Acoustic guitar on "I Was Raised In Babylon"	22	24
2014	Соль (Salt)	Boris Grebenshchikov	Guitar on "Губернатор" ("Governor") and "На ржавом ветру" ("In Rusty Wind")	—	—
2015	Emerald	Dar Williams	Guitar on the title track	—	—
2016	75th Birthday Celebration	Joan Baez	Guitar on "House of the Rising Sun", "She Never Could Resist a Winding Road" and "The Boxer", plus vocals on the latter two.	—	—
2016	Cayamo: Sessions at Sea	Buddy Miller	Electric guitar and vocals on "Wedding Bells"	—	—
2017	Streets of London	Ralph McTell featuring the Crisis Choir with guest vocalist Annie Lennox	Single raising money for Crisis. Thompson plays an electric guitar solo.	94	—
2018	Smalls Change	Derek Smalls	Guitar on "She Puts the Bitch in Obituary"	—	—
2018	Letters Never Read	Dori Freeman	Electric guitar	—	—
2019	Second Hand Sexbot	Judith Owen	Single. Thompson plays guitar on the studio recording.	—	—
2020	Song to a Refugee	Diana Jones	Guitar and harmony vocals on "I Wait for You" and the title track, vocals and electric guitar on "We Believe You"	—	—
2020	Meditation and KitKats	Zara Phillips	Guitar, mandolin, dulcimer, accordion and harmony vocals	—	—
2020	Heartbreaker Please	Teddy Thompson	Electric guitar on the title track	—	—
2020	Dudu Phukwana and the "Spears"	Dudu Phukwana and the "Spears"	Thompson played guitar on an 'album of mostly unreleased 1969 recordings' that were released in 2020 packaged with the group's self-titled debut (released in 1969)	—	—
2021	Red Willow	Michael Hays	Guitar on "Road Will Rise"	—	—
2022	The Admiralty Lights: Complete Studio, Live and Rare 1964-2009	Al Stewart	Thompson plays on some radio sessions from 1972	—	—
2024	Julian Dawson	Julian Dawson	Guitar on "Jesus and Judas" and "That's Why God Made Saturday Night"	—	—
2024	The Definitive Anthology 1977-1981	Bruce Woolley & The Camera Club	Cimbalom on "Morning Kids" from the band's previously unreleased 1980 recordings with producer John Wood	—	—
2026	Never Be the Same	Teddy Thompson	Guitar riff on "Make Up Your Mind"	—	—

== DVDs and videos ==
Released	Title	Credited to	Recorded	Format	Notes
1984	DTV: Rock, Rhythm & Blues	various artists	—	VHS	Music set to old Disney animated footage, includes Thompson's "Two Left Feet"
1985	Across a Crowded Room	Richard Thompson	1985	VHS, Laserdisc	
1997	Best of Sessions at West 54th, Volume 1	various artists	1997	DVD	Thompson performs "I Feel So Good" live
2004	Live in Providence	The Richard Thompson Band	2003	DVD	
2005	Live From Austin, TX	Richard Thompson	2001	DVD	
2006	Mountain Stage: An Evening With Nanci Griffith, Paul Brady, Richard Thompson	Nanci Griffith / Paul Brady / Richard Thompson	2001	DVD	
2006	1,000 Years of Popular Music	Richard Thompson	2005	DVD, with 2 audio CDs	
2006	The Harry Smith Project Live	various artists	2001	DVD	Thompson performs "The Coo Coo Bird" with Eliza Carthy
2008	Guitar Legends in Sevilla	various artists	1991	DVD	Thompson plays "Keep Your Distance" and "Jerusalem On The Juke Box", and "Running and Hiding" with Roger McGuinn, Les Paul, Robbie Robertson and Roger Waters
2011	Live at the BBC	Richard Thompson featuring Linda Thompson	1975 to 1985	DVD (box set, also with 3 CDs)	
2011	Spectacle - Season 2	Elvis Costello with...	2010	DVD	Thompson appears on episode 3 alongside Costello and the Imposters, Levon Helm, Nick Lowe, Allen Toussaint and Ray LaMontagne. He performs "Shoot Out the Lights" solo and "Tennessee Jed", "A Certain Girl" and "The Weight" with the assembled musicians.
2012	Live at Celtic Connections	The Richard Thompson Band	2011	DVD, Blu-ray Disc	

== Instructional tapes and discs ==
Released	Title	Credited to	Format
1983	The Electric Mandolin 1 and 2: Mandolin Theory, Technique, & Improvisation	Niles Hokkanen and Richard Thompson	Cassette
1983	Rock Guitar: A Guide from the Greats	Ronnie Wood, Michael Schenker, Richard Thompson and John Wilson	VHS
1986	The Guitar of Richard Thompson	Richard Thompson	tapes/CDs & book
1998	Richard Thompson Teaches Traditional Guitar Instrumentals	Richard Thompson	CD & book
