= Live from Austin, TX (Richard Thompson album) =

Live album by Richard Thompson
- Released: May 2005
- Recorded: 2001 in Austin, Texas
- Genre: Rock
- Length: 69:27
- Label: New West Records
- Producer: Cameron Strang, Jay Woods, Gary Briggs

Richard Thompson chronology
The Chrono Show (2004)	Live from Austin, TX (2005)	Front Parlour Ballads (2005)

Professional ratings
Review scores
Source	Rating
AllMusic	4/5 stars
Encyclopedia of Popular Music	3/5 stars
Pitchfork	7,6/10
PopMatters	6/10

Live from Austin, TX is a live album by Richard Thompson, recorded in 2001 and released in 2005 on CD and DVD.

Thompson has composed and performed since the late 1960s, and has been signed to several major labels, but despite his reputation as a compelling and powerful live performer, live albums have been few and far between for most of his career.

There was the flawed (and later withdrawn), Small Town Romance in 1984, and several not-for-retail releases on Thompson's own boutique labels. Then in 2004 Cooking Vinyl released a live DVD (Live In Providence) and in 2005 New West Records released this recording of a 2001 performance given for KLRU's Austin City Limits series.

Unlike Thompson's boutique live releases, available at his website and at his shows, Live from Austin, TX is an audio recording of a single show. Thompson's boutique releases, such as Ducknapped! and Semi-Detached Mock Tudor are compiled from a large number of different shows on the same tour.

This performance was given in KLRU's studios in front of an audience. Unusually the band is a trio, with Thompson joined by bassist Danny Thompson (no relation) and drummer Michael Jerome. Danny Thompson and Jerome had toured as members of the Richard Thompson band in 1999 and 2000, and would go on to work with him in 2002 on the recording sessions for the 2003 release The Old Kit Bag.

The DVD version of Live From Austin, TX includes an extra track, "Put It There Pal" omitted from the CD. Neither version includes the entire performance that Thompson gave at the KLRU studios. Thompson broke a guitar string during "Shoot Out The Lights" and whilst the guitar was being restrung he performed an a cappella rendition of the 19th century music hall song "Sam Hall".

== Track listing ==
All songs composed by Richard Thompson except "Persuasion" which is written by Tim Finn and Richard Thompson.

1. "Cooksferry Queen"
2. "Uninhabited Man"
3. "Walking The Long Miles Home"
4. "Al Bowlly's In Heaven"
5. "Mingus Eyes"
6. "Dry My Tears And Move On"
7. "Easy There, Steady Now"
8. "Persuasion"
9. "Bathsheba Smiles"
10. "Mr. Rebound"
11. "Ghosts In The Wind"
12. "She Twists The Knife Again"
13. "Shoot Out The Lights"
14. "Crawl Back (Under My Stone)"
15. "1952 Vincent Black Lightning"

== Personnel ==
- Richard Thompson – guitar and vocals
- Danny Thompson – double bass
- Michael Jerome – drums
