= More Guitar =

Live album by Richard Thompson
- Released: April 2003
- Recorded: November 1988 in Washington, D.C.
- Genre: Rock
- Length: 76:36
- Label: Beeswing
- Producer: Henry Kaiser

Richard Thompson chronology
The Old Kit Bag (2002)	More Guitar (2003)	1000 Years of Popular Music (2003)

Professional ratings
Review scores
Source	Rating
AllMusic	4/5 stars
Encyclopedia of Popular Music	3/5 stars

More Guitar is a live album by Richard Thompson recorded in November, 1988. Thompson, performing with his band, was recorded at The Bayou, a music venue in Washington, D.C.

As the album's title suggests, Henry Kaiser's track selection for More Guitar places emphasis on Thompson's electric guitar soloing – though it stands by itself as a complete performance, and accordion player John Kirkpatrick is given an extended solo on The Animals hit "We Got To Get Out Of This Place". Thompson's playing on this album is technically impressive and fluent (even by the standards of a man long hailed as one of rock music's most talented and novel players), harmonically sophisticated and shows his wide stylistic range and influences – from British folk forms on "The Angels Took My Racehorse Away" to bebop on the opening "Don't Tempt Me".

The drummer for the performances, Kenny Aronoff, was filling in for Thompson's regular drummer at the time, Dave Mattacks. Mattacks was unable to play the gigs due to injury, according to a review of the show published by The Washington Post. Aronoff was at the time the studio and touring drummer for John Cougar Mellencamp, though in the 1990s and afterward he worked with Bob Dylan, Willie Nelson, Elton John, The Rolling Stones and other musical acts.

== Recording ==
Though the liner notes for More Guitar do not provide the exact date of the recording or any engineering credits, the Watching the Dark compilation does provide this information for two tracks included on the compilation that were recorded during the performance featured on More Guitar. Watching the Dark's notes state that Thompson played The Bayou on November 7, and the recording was originally made by recording engineer Greg Hartman’s Big Mo Recording Services for broadcast on radio station WHFS. A contemporaneous newspaper review of the show, published on November 9 in The Washington Post, confirms the date of the performance.

== Distribution ==
More Guitar was never made available in retail stores. It may be available at Thompson's live shows or from his website.

== Track listing ==
All songs written by Richard Thompson except where noted otherwises

1. "Don't Tempt Me"
2. "Can't Win"
3. "Jennie"
4. "Gypsy Love Songs"
5. "The Angels Took My Racehorse Away"
6. "When The Spell Is Broken"
7. "Shoot Out The Lights"
8. "I Still Dream"
9. "Here Without You" (Gene Clark)
10. "A Bone Through Her Nose
11. "We Got To Get Out Of This Place" (Barry Mann, Cynthia Weil)
12. "Jerusalem On The Jukebox"

== Personnel ==
- Richard Thompson – electric guitar, acoustic guitar and vocals
- John Kirkpatrick – accordion, backing vocals
- Christine Collister – backing vocals
- Clive Gregson – electric guitar, acoustic guitar, backing vocals and electric organ
- Pat Donaldson – bass guitar
- Kenny Aronoff – drums
