= Acoustic Rarities =

Studio album by Richard Thompson
- Released: 6 October 2017
- Length: 48:36
- Label: Beeswing
- Producers: Richard Thompson; Simon Tassano

Richard Thompson chronology
Acoustic Classics II (2017)	Acoustic Rarities (2017)	13 Rivers (2018)

Acoustic Rarities is an album by English musician Richard Thompson. It was released on 6 October 2017 through Thompson's Beeswing label. Like its predecessors, Acoustic Classics (2014) and Acoustic Classics II (2017), Acoustic Rarities is a collection of solo performances of songs from Thompson's back catalogue. Alongside eight re-recordings are six previously unreleased tracks, with some songs on the record dating back to Thompson's tenure with the band Fairport Convention.

== Reception ==
Acoustic Rarities has received positive reviews. Louder Than War praised the "eclectic" track selection and noted the album's "depth" will "go some way to satisfying the real fans who know their Thompson stuff inside out". God Is in the TV argued that the record avoids the pitfalls of most "rarities" albums, due to Thompson having "amassed a number of great songs" which "are deserving of being heard, stripped down to voice and guitar".

== Track listing ==
All tracks are written by Richard Thompson, except "Sloth" and "Poor Will and the Jolly Hangman" by Thompson and Dave Swarbrick.

Acoustic Rarities track listing
No.	Title	Length
1.	"What If?"	3:38
2.	"They Tore the Hippodrome Down"	4:32
3.	"Seven Brothers"	3:37
4.	"Rainbow over the Hill"	2:27
5.	"Never Again"	2:35
6.	"I Must Have a March"	3:25
7.	"I'll Take All My Sorrows to the Sea"	2:27
8.	"The Poor Ditching Boy"	3:10
9.	"Alexander Graham Bell"	3:10
10.	"Sloth"	5:27
11.	"Push and Shove"	3:16
12.	"End of the Rainbow"	3:46
13.	"Poor Will and the Jolly Hangman"	4:32
14.	"She Played Right into My Hands"	2:34
Total length:		48:36

== Personnel ==
- Richard Thompson – all instruments and vocals, production
- Simon Tassano – production, mixing
- Andrew Mendelson – mastering
- Ben Bowlder – artwork
