= The Chrono Show =

Live album by Richard Thompson
- Released: September 2004
- Recorded: 2004 in the U.S.
- Genre: Rock
- Length: 61:26
- Label: Beeswing
- Producer: Simon Tassano

Richard Thompson chronology
Faithless (2004)	The Chrono Show (2004)	Live From Austin, TX (2005)

The Chrono Show is a live album by Richard Thompson. The album is compiled from recordings made during Thompson's 2004 tour of America, and features songs from Thompson's back catalog, most of them written prior to 1983 and arranged in mostly chronological order.

The opening "Watch Me Go" had been more recently written and never before released and the closing "She May Call You Up Tonight" (with vocals by Thompson's son Teddy) is a Left Banke cover that he has featured in live performances since the 1970s.

"Jack O'Diamonds" has lyrics by Bob Dylan and dates back to Fairport Convention's first album (1968).

The lyrics to "Hokey Pokey" are substantially revised from the original version recorded in 1974.

== Track listing ==
All songs composed by Richard Thompson except where noted:

1. "Watch Me Go"
2. "Jack O'Diamonds" (Ben Carruthers, Bob Dylan)
3. "Meet on the Ledge"
4. "The Poor Ditching Boy"
5. "Nobody's Wedding"
6. "I Want to See the Bright Lights Tonight"
7. "The Great Valerio"
8. "I'll Regret It All In The Morning"
9. "Hokey Pokey"
10. "For Shame Of Doing Wrong"
11. "Banish Misfortune" (traditional, arranged by Richard Thompson)
12. "Did She Jump Or Was She Pushed" (Richard and Linda Thompson)
13. "Hand Of Kindness"
14. "Devonside"
15. "Sibella"
16. "She May Call You Up Tonight" (Steve Martin, Michael Brown)

== Personnel ==
- Richard Thompson - guitar and vocals
- Teddy Thompson - vocals on "She May Call You Up Tonight".
