= Acoustic Classics II =

Studio album by Richard Thompson
- Released: 10 August 2017
- Recorded: Rumiville Studio, Austin, Texas
- Genre: Folk rock
- Length: 54:24
- Label: Beeswing
- Producers: Richard Thompson and Simon Tassano

Richard Thompson chronology
Still (2015)	Acoustic Classics II (2017)	Acoustic Rarities (2017)

Acoustic Classics II is the seventeenth solo studio album by British singer-songwriter Richard Thompson. It was released by Beeswing Records on 10 August 2017.

== Background ==
Acoustic Classics II is the second acoustic compilation album by Richard Thompson. The songs range from his time in Fairport Convention, as half of a duo with Linda Thompson and as a solo artist.

The album was released on vinyl, CD and digital download.

== Critical reception ==
Professional ratings
Aggregate scores
Source	Rating
Metacritic	78/100
Review scores
Source	Rating
AllMusic	3.5/5 stars
Encyclopedia of Popular Music	4/5 stars
Financial Times	4/5 stars
Folk Radio UK	Positive
The Guardian	4/5 stars
The Independent	4/5 stars
The Press	5/5 stars
Record Collector	3/5 stars
The Times	3/5 stars
Uncut	4/5 stars

On the Metacritic website, which aggregates reviews from critics and assigns a normalised rating out of 100, Acoustic Classics II received a score of 78, based on 1 mixed and 4 positive reviews.

Among the critics that gave the album positive reviews, Uncut called the album "an unalloyed treat" adding that "there's something fundamentally satisfying about Thompson unplugged". Andy Gill writing in The Independent states that "there’s no dip in quality here as Richard Thompson revisits material" and Folk Radio UK call the album "one to treasure". David Honigman of the Financial Times writes that "this second volume Richard Thompson has recorded of acoustic cover versions of his own songs works better than the first" and Jude Rogers in The Guardian praises Thompson's "authoritative, confident voice" and "pearl-bright guitar-playing".

== Track listing ==
All tracks written by Richard Thompson except "Crazy Man Michael" by Thompson and Dave Swarbrick:

#	Title	Original version on	Length
1.	"She Twists the Knife Again"	Across a Crowded Room (1985)	2:48
2.	"The Ghost of You Walks"	You? Me? Us? (1996)	4:41
3.	"Genesis Hall"	Unhalfbricking (1969)	3:30
4.	"Jet Plane in a Rocking Chair"	Pour Down Like Silver (1975)	2:29
5.	"A Heart Needs a Home"	Hokey Pokey (1975)	3:26
6.	"Pharaoh"	Amnesia (1988)	4:25
7.	"Gethsemane"	The Old Kit Bag (2003)	5:13
8.	"Devonside"	Hand of Kindness (1983)	3:05
9.	"Meet on the Ledge"	What We Did on Our Holidays (1969)	3:05
10.	"Keep Your Distance"	Rumor and Sigh (1991)	3:35
11.	"Bathsheba Smiles"	Mock Tudor (1999)	3:33
12.	"Crazy Man Michael"	Liege & Lief (1969)	4:23
13.	"Guns Are the Tongues"	Sweet Warrior (2007)	6:05
14.	"Why Must I Plead?"	Rumor and Sigh (1991)	4:06

== Personnel ==
Richard Thompson – guitars and vocals

=== Others ===
- Artwork: Ben Bowdler
- Guitars: George Lowden

== Chart performance ==
Chart (2017)	Peak position
UK Albums (Official Charts)	24
