= 13 Rivers =

Studio album by Richard Thompson
- Released: 14 September 2018
- Studio: Boulevard Recording, Hollywood
- Genre: Folk rock
- Length: 53:30
- Label: New West (US); Proper (UK)
- Producer: Richard Thompson

Richard Thompson chronology
Acoustic Rarities (2017)	13 Rivers (2018)	Ship to Shore (2024)

13 Rivers is the eighteenth solo studio album by British singer/songwriter Richard Thompson. It was released on 14 September 2018 by New West Records in the US and by Proper Records in the UK.

== Background ==
13 Rivers was written after a period of difficulty for Thompson's family with songs that stick "close to a vision of darkness, gloom, and noise". Thompson explains that the songs were written in a "fairly tight time period of about six months", giving them a sense of commonality. He states that "many of these songs came to him as a pleasant surprise and that feeling of grabbing the creative urge and running with it is what comes across throughout the running time".

The record was self-produced by Thompson with the album and some minor overdubs being recorded entirely on analogue equipment over a 10-day period. The album title derives from the song count, with Thompson explaining that "there are 13 songs on the record, and each one is like a river. Some flow faster than others". This is illustrated further by the album's cover art which features a map by Thompson "showing the individual songs on the album flowing into a central lake".

In 2019 Robin Denselow, interviewing Thompson for The Guardian suggested the album was "filled with religious imagery"; Thompson explained, "... because I love the King James Bible, a beautiful piece of poetry, and you have to speak to people in a language that's familiar." Although coming after his divorce from Nancy Covey and his move to New Jersey, he insisted, that the album was not autobiographical: "I have no perspective on what I am doing. I write a song and think, 'Where does this come from?' Me? I wrote this? I write fiction ... I'm just enjoying myself, throwing lines together. I think it always reflects your own experience and feelings, but it isn’t always in a way that’s clear. If you find something honest enough in yourself then it will be universal."

== Critical reception ==
Professional ratings
Aggregate scores
Source	Rating
Metacritic	81/100
Review scores
Source	Rating
AllMusic	4/5 stars
The Encyclopedia of Popular Music	4/5 stars
The Financial Times	3/5 stars
The Irish Times	4/5 stars
Mojo	4/5 stars
PopMatters	8/10
Uncut	9/10

On Metacritic, which aggregates reviews from critics and assigns a normalised rating out of 100, 13 Rivers received a score of 81, based on one mixed and six positive reviews.

The album received generally favourable reviews from the press, with it being described as "brilliant" and "engaging" by PopMatters who stated that 13 Rivers was "a raw, unfiltered affair from a veteran artist who shows no signs of slowing down". Folk Radio UK called 13 Rivers "a toothy energetic album" and Uncut wrote that "13 Rivers is a sparse, raging and noisy record". The Irish Times agreed that "the tone is ominous from the get-go"" and Mojo wrote that "this may be Richard Thompson's most creative album in decades" describing the record as being "driven along by a renewed sense of urgency and purpose". NPR felt that the album had captured Thompson's live sound, explaining that "the live show is always spectacular, and on 13 Rivers, Thompson more than manages to bring that live energy and those searing and soaring guitar solos to life in the studio". AllMusic wrote that "Thompson's vocals are superb throughout" claiming that "13 Rivers is striking music from a musician who remains fresh, contemporary, and peerless".

== Track listing ==
All tracks written by Richard Thompson:

1. "The Storm Won't Come" – 6:11
2. "The Rattle Within" – 3:06
3. "Her Love Was Meant for Me" – 5:01
4. "Bones of Gilead" – 4:21
5. "The Dog in You" – 4:54
6. "Trying" – 3:35
7. "Do All These Tears Belong to You?" – 4:13
8. "My Rock, My Rope" – 3:19
9. "You Can't Reach Me" – 3:58
10. "O, Cinderella" – 3:49
11. "No Matter" – 3:46
12. "Pride" – 3:17
13. "Shaking the Gates" – 4:00

== Personnel ==
- Richard Thompson – vocals, guitar and keyboards
- Michael Jerome – drums, percussion and vocals
- Taras Prodaniuk – bass guitar and vocals
- Bobby Eichorn – guitar
- Siobhan Maher Kennedy – harmony vocal
- Judith Owen – harmony vocal on "No Matter"
- Zara Phillips – harmony vocal

== Charts ==
Chart (2018)	Peak position
Belgian Albums (Ultratop Flanders)	61
Scottish Albums (OCC)	10
Swiss Albums (Schweizer Hitparade)	96
UK Albums (OCC)	18
