= Still (Richard Thompson album) =

Studio album by Richard Thompson
- Released: 23 June 2015
- Studios: The Loft Studio, Chicago
- Genres: English folk, folk rock
- Length: 50:46
- Labels: Fantasy (US), Proper (UK)
- Producer: Jeff Tweedy

Richard Thompson chronology
Acoustic Classics (2014)	Still (2015)	Acoustic Classics II (2017)

Still is the sixteenth solo studio album by British singer-songwriter Richard Thompson. It was released by Fantasy Records, on 23 June 2015, in the US and by Proper Records, on 29 June 2015, in the UK.

== Background ==
The album Still was produced by Wilco's Jeff Tweedy and recorded at Wilco's The Loft Studio in Chicago. Thompson approached Tweedy as he wished to shake up his approach to making records, stating that "Jeff is musically very sympathetic. Although some of his contributions are probably rather subtle to the listener’s ear, they were really interesting and his suggestions were always very pertinent." Tweedy stated that "Richard's been one of my favorite guitar players for a very long time...he's also one of my favorite songwriters and favorite singers".

The album was released digitally, on CD, deluxe CD (including the Variations EP) and vinyl. including 45 rpm 2 disc LP

== Critical reception ==
Professional ratings
Aggregate scores
Source	Rating
Metacritic	80/100
Review scores
Source	Rating
Encyclopedia of Popular Music	4/5 stars
The Guardian	4/5 stars
The Independent	Positive
Mojo	4/5 stars
The Observer	4/5 stars
Pitchfork	7.5/10
Rolling Stone	3.5/5 stars
Uncut	8/10

On the Metacritic website, which aggregates reviews from critics and assigns a normalised rating out of 100, Still received a score of 80, based on 20 positive and 2 mixed reviews. Pitchfork writes that Still "feels extremely present and immediate", calling it "a solid, stark record". Uncut states that Still is Thompson "striving for a modest kind of perfection" and almost achieving it. The Guardian writes that "Thompson is still unique" in their positive review. The Observer note that "Thompson’s resourcefulness shows no sign of waning" on an album they call "characteristically stormy". Rolling Stone write that Thompson has not mellowed with age with songs "still full of dangerous women and treacherous con men". The Independent call Still "a brilliant, nigh-on faultless work from an acknowledged master", stating that "his songwriting, too, is as good here as it’s ever been". Mojo named Still their Album of the Week, writing that "if this was a new act, people would be falling over themselves to sing its praises, but Thompson raised the bar so high so many years ago that this is simply what’s expected of him.

== Track listing ==
All tracks written by Richard Thompson, except "Guitar Heroes" by Thompson and containing interpolations of "Melodie au Crepuscule" by Django Reinhardt, "Caravan" by Juan Tizol and Duke Ellington, "Brenda Lee" by Chuck Berry, "Susie Q" by Stan Lewis, Dale Hawkins and Eleanor Broadwater and "F.B.I." by Hank Marvin, Bruce Welch and Jet Harris.

1. "She Never Could Resist a Winding Road" – 4:28
2. "Beatnik Walking" – 3:54
3. "Patty Don’t You Put Me Down" – 4:30
4. "Broken Doll" – 3:51
5. "All Buttoned Up" – 4:07
6. "Josephine" – 3:24
7. "Long John Silver" – 4:00
8. "Pony in the Stable" – 2:44
9. "Where’s Your Heart" – 4:05
10. "No Peace No End" – 4:15
11. "Dungeons for Eyes" – 3:49
12. "Guitar Heroes" – 7:39

Variations EP (included with the deluxe edition CD)

13. "Fork in the Road" – 4:26
14. "Wounding Myself" – 3:58
15. "The May Queen" – 5:15
16. "Don't Take It Laying Down" – 6:53
17. "Fergus Laing" – 4:36

== Personnel ==
- Richard Thompson – vocals, guitar, accordion, ukulele, mandolin
- Jim Elkington – guitar, piano
- Taras Prodaniuk – bass
- Michael Jerome – drums, percussion
- Siobhan Kennedy – harmony vocal
- Sima Cunningham – harmony vocal
- Liam Cunningham – harmony vocal
- Jeff Tweedy – guitar, Marxophone, mellotron, GuitarOrgan, OPI

== Charts ==
Chart (2015–2016)	Peak position
Belgian Albums (Ultratop Flanders)	86
Belgian Albums (Ultratop Wallonia)	163
Dutch Albums (Album Top 100)	20
German Albums (Offizielle Top 100)	91
Norwegian Albums (VG-lista)	39
Scottish Albums (Official Charts)	8
UK Albums (Official Charts)	10
UK Americana Albums (Official Charts)	37
UK Independent Albums (Official Charts)	1
UK Album Downloads (Official Charts)	82
UK Vinyl Albums (OCC)	3
US Billboard 200	82
US Top Folk Albums (Billboard)	4
US Top Rock Albums (Billboard)	12
US Top Tastemaker Albums (Billboard)	4
