= Front Parlour Ballads =

Studio album by Richard Thompson
- Released: 9 August 2005
- Recorded: 2004
- Studio: Trellis Sound, Pacific Palisades, California
- Genre: Contemporary folk
- Length: 46:47
- Label: Cooking Vinyl
- Producer: Richard Thompson, Simon Tassano

Richard Thompson chronology
Live from Austin, TX (2005)	Front Parlour Ballads (2005)	Grizzly Man (2006)

Professional ratings
Aggregate scores
Source	Rating
Metacritic	75/100
Review scores
Source	Rating
Rolling Stone	3.5/5 stars
Encyclopedia of Popular Music	3/5 stars
Allmusic	4.5/5 stars

Front Parlour Ballads is the twelfth studio album by Richard Thompson, recorded in 2004.

Released on the Cooking Vinyl label in August 2005, Front Parlour Ballads was literally a homemade album. Thompson's aim was to create an album that sounded small and intimate. It was hailed as his first solo, all acoustic album since 1981– but strictly speaking it's neither of those things – percussionist Debra Dobkin played on two tracks ("Let It Blow" and "My Soul, My Soul") and Thompson himself added electric guitar to the same two tracks.

Thompson had a small studio built in his garage at home and recorded the tracks onto his laptop computer, adding his own overdubs as he deemed necessary. Dobkin's contributions were recorded in the same way.

Thompson did not expect to sell many copies of Front Parlour Ballads. The critics, as usual, acclaimed the new release, but rather more surprising were strong early sales in both the U.S. and Britain, and Front Parlour Ballads debuted in the indie charts on both sides of the Atlantic.

== Reception ==
Reviewing the album for The Guardian, Robin Denselow said: "Recording at home suits him. Even with the over-dubs, this set has the vitality of a live performance, and he clearly feels relaxed enough to take chances with the sometimes elaborate songs, delivering both the expected guitar skills and some fluid, difficult vocals. As with Dylan, Thompson's singing is something of an acquired taste; here it ranges from the wild and declamatory to slow, brooding and often complex ballads... Thompson has always mixed humour with a bleak sense of impending danger, tragedy and anger (it was only appropriate that his retrospective compilation was titled Watching the Dark) and the songs here are often more bitter than sweet."

== Track listing ==
All songs written by Richard Thompson.

1. "Let It Blow"
2. "For Whose Sake?"
3. "Miss Patsy"
4. "Old Thames Side"
5. "How Does Your Garden Grow?"
6. "My Soul, My Soul"
7. "Cressida"
8. "Row, Boys Row"
9. "The Boys Of Mutton Street"
10. "Precious One"
11. "A Solitary Life"
12. "Should I Betray?"
13. "When We Were Boys At School"

== Personnel ==
=== Musicians ===
- Richard Thompson – electric guitar, acoustic guitar, mandolin, accordion, bass guitar and vocals
- Debra Dobkin – percussion

=== Technical ===
- Producer – Simon Tassano, Richard Thompson
- Mixing – Simon Tassano
- Mastering – Jim Wilson
- Package design – Tornado Design
- Art direction – Al Quattrocchi, Jeff Smith
- Cover illustration – Lou Beach
- Photography – Ron Slenzak & Associates
