= Ship to Shore (Richard Thompson album) =

Studio album by Richard Thompson
- Released: 31 May 2024
- Studios: Applehead Studio, Woodstock, New York, US
- Genres: British folk; British folk rock
- Length: 42:57
- Label: New West
- Producer: Richard Thompson

Richard Thompson chronology
13 Rivers (2017)	Ship to Shore (2024)	Hippies, Thugs and Heroes (2026)

I think we missed the vibe by 60 years. It's a bit touristy now, every other shop has a case of crystals. I wanted to get out of New Jersey because it was a bit dull. I didn't want to go back to the West Coast because New Jersey's so convenient for popping over to Europe. I thought of Woodstock, because there's a musical community up there. It's beautiful up there in the Catskills, really lovely. We visited the basement at Big Pink—there's an energy there, definitely, the sound molecules have altered the room somehow.

— Richard Thompson on living in Woodstock, New York, recording location of Ship to Shore

Ship to Shore is the nineteenth studio album by British folk rock musician Richard Thompson, released on 31 May 2024 through New West Records. It has received positive reviews from critics. The album was launched with a band UK tour featuring Taras Prodaniuk on bass, Thompson's grandson Zak Hobbs on guitar and mandolin, Zara Phillips on vocals and acoustic guitar and Dave Mattacks on drums. The album's title comes from ship-to-shore radio that Thompson listened to as a boy.

== Reception ==
According to the review aggregator Metacritic, Ship to Shore received "universal acclaim" based on a weighted average score of 86 out of 100 from 6 critic scores. Critical consensus is that this is one of the strongest albums in Thompson's career.

Editors at AllMusic rated this album 4 out of 5 stars, with critic Timothy Monger writing that this serves as "almost a sequel to 2018's 13 Rivers... that plays like an amalgam of his career's disparate styles" and ended his review stating that Thompson "also remains a top-notch songsmith and vocalist makes him one of the rare triple-threats who consistently delivers". At The Arts Desk, Tim Cumming rated this album a 4 out of 5 stars, stating that "no one puts misery to music as adeptly as Thompson" and that this release "is classic Thompson, the songster of misery and despair who doesn't often change that tune while always delivering something tasty, fresh and new".

Steven Wine of the Associated Press praised the guitar solos in particular on this album, as well as Thompson's vocals and stated that this release "meets his consistently high standard while sounding like no one else". Online retailer Bandcamp chose this as Album of the Day and Jon Dale wrote that Thompson is "excellent at detailing the everyday bleakness of life quietly lived, and Ship To Shore is full of moments where his songs' protagonists are left noiselessly hanging by a thread". Classic Rock's John Aizlewood rated this album 4.5 out of 5 stars, characterizing it as Thompson's "most rumbustious album in years", featuring a "a supremely taut band".

David Honigmann gave Ship to Shore 4 out of 5 stars, writing in the Financial Times that it "sounds like a greatest hits release" and praised the interplay between Thompson and guitarist Bobby Eichorn. In Glide Magazine, Jim Hynes highlighted the shifts in genre between more traditional British folk and electric tracks and summed up that this is "as solid as any of his recordings". Jim Wirth of Mojo rated the release 4 out of 5 stars stating that "it is a record about defeat, despair and humiliation delivered with an unsettling avuncular twinkle, and a lingering sense that the moments when his spring is wound at its tightest might also be the ones where Thompson feels the most alive".

A musicOMH, Chris White scored this album 3.5 out of 5 stars, calling it "a remarkably fresh and vital sounding record, with Thompson's rich baritone voice undimmed by the years and a clutch of excellent songs, mostly characterised by his familiar themes of vulnerability, disappointment and loss". In The Observer, Kitty Empire gave Ship to Shore 4 out of 5 stars with songs that "are never less than beautiful", even with bleak moods and dour lyrics. Jon M. Gilbterson of The Shepherd Express wrote that this work "cocks an eyebrow at anyone who thinks the English singer, songwriter, and guitarist would rest solely on his reputation" and that it "as a whole demonstrates that the grind hasn't ground down his artistry".

The track "Singapore Sadie" was released as the first single from the album.

=== Year-end lists ===
Select year-end rankings for Ship to Shore
Publication/critic	Accolade	Rank	Ref.
MOJO	The Best Albums Of 2024	23	
Rough Trade UK	Albums of the Year 2024	79	
Uncut	80 Best Albums of 2024	43	

== Track listing ==
All tracks are written by Richard Thompson.

1. "Freeze" – 3:24
2. "The Fear Never Leaves You" – 4:55
3. "Singapore Sadie" – 4:08
4. "Trust" – 4:16
5. "The Day That I Give In" – 3:18
6. "The Old Pack Mule" – 4:18
7. "Turnstile Casanova" – 3:25
8. "Lost in the Crowd" – 3:24
9. "Maybe" – 4:00
10. "Life's a Bloody Show" – 3:55
11. "What's Left to Lose" – 4:14
12. "We Roll" – 4:45

== Personnel ==
- Richard Thompson – guitars, mandolin, accordion, vocals, production

Additional musicians

- Bobby Eichhorn – acoustic guitars, electric guitars
- Michael Jerome – drums, percussion
- David Mansfield – fiddle
- Zara Phillips – harmony vocals
- Taras Prodaniuk – bass guitar

Technical personnel

- Chris Athens – audio mastering at Athens Masters, Austin, Texas, U.S.
- Tom Bejgrowicz of Man Alive Creative – design, layout
- Chris Bittner – audio engineering
- Michael Dicken – cover art illustration
- David Kaptein – photography

== Charts ==
Chart performance for Ship to Shore
Chart (2024)	Peak position
Swiss Albums (Schweizer Hitparade)	95
UK Albums (Official Charts)	46

== See also ==
- 2024 in British music
- List of 2024 albums
