= Strict Tempo! =

Studio album by Richard Thompson
- Released: September 1981
- Recorded: 1981
- Studios: BTW, Wood Green, London, and Woodworm, Cropredy.
- Genre: Folk
- Length: 42:09
- Labels: Elixir; Topic (CD, 1992); Omnivore (CD, 2011)
- Producer: Richard Thompson

Richard Thompson chronology
Live! (More or Less) (1976)	Strict Tempo! (1981)	Hand of Kindness (1983)

Strict Tempo! is the second studio album by Richard Thompson, released in 1981. Apart from soundtracks, it is Thompson's only entirely instrumental studio album. The album consists of some of the artist's favourite tunes, all rendered as instrumentals and all arranged for guitar, mandolin, and other instruments played by Thompson. The only other musician is drummer Dave Mattacks.

After the modest sales for their 1979 album Sunnyvista, Richard and Linda Thompson found themselves without a record deal. To generate some income, Thompson formed his own record label Elixir Records and recorded this album mostly at the small BTW studio in London, and also at the Woodworm Studios near Cropredy.

The album was re-released on CD by Topic Records in 1992, and again on CD by Omnivore Recordings in 2011.

== Critical reception ==
Professional ratings
Review scores
Source	Rating
AllMusic	3/5 stars
Robert Christgau	B
The Encyclopedia of Popular Music	3/5 stars
The Rolling Stone Album Guide	3.5/5 stars
Spin Alternative Record Guide	8/10

Robert Christgau wrote that the songs are "recommended to folkies, ex-folkies, guitar adepts, and students of European song."

== Track listing ==
All songs are traditional, arranged by Richard Thompson, except where noted.

Side one
No.	Title	Length
1.	"New Fangled Flogging Reel/Kerry Reel"	2:45
2.	"Vaillance Polka Militaire/Belfast Polka"	3:25
3.	"Scott Skinner Medley: Glencoe/Scott Skinner's Rockin' Step/Bonny Banchory"	4:40
4.	"Banish Misfortune"	3:00
5.	"Dundee Hornpipe/Poppy Leaf Hornpipe"	3:15
6.	"Do It for My Sake"	2:30

Side two
No.	Title	Writer(s)	Length
1.	"Rockin' in Rhythm"	Duke Ellington	2:40
2.	"The Random Jig/The Grinder"		2:45
3.	"Will Ye No Cam Back Again/Cam O'er the Stream Charlie/Ye Banks & Braes"		3:30
4.	"Rufty Tufty/Nonsuch à la Mode de France"		2:15
5.	"Andalus/Radio Marrakesh"		3:05
6.	"The Knife-edge"	Thompson	5:30

== Musicians ==
- Richard Thompson – guitar, bass guitar, mandolin, banjo, mandocello, dulcimer, harmonium, pennywhistle, dobro
- Dave Mattacks – drums, piano on Ye Banks And Braes

Other personnel

- John Borthwick – engineer, BTW
- Simon Nicol – engineer, Woodworm
- Richard Thompson – producer, liner notes

Topic Records, 1992 CD

- Tony Engle – design
- David Suff – illustration (cover drawing), liner notes
- Fin Costello – photography
