= Electric (Richard Thompson album) =

Studio album by Richard Thompson
- Released: 11 February 2013 (UK); 5 February 2013 (USA)
- Recorded: Buddy Miller's house, May 2012
- Genre: British folk rock
- Length: 50:01
- Labels: Proper (UK, Europe); New West (North America)
- Producer: Buddy Miller

Richard Thompson chronology
| Cabaret Of Souls (2012) | Electric (2013) | Acoustic Classics (2014) |

Electric is the fourteenth studio album by Richard Thompson, released in 2013.

== Overview ==
The album was recorded in Buddy Miller's home in Nashville in May 2012. Thompson took his stripped down "electric trio" band (himself, bass player Taras Prodaniuk and drummer Michael Jerome) to the sessions. Miller produced, played some rhythm guitar parts and brought in some local players to augment the trio, notably Stuart Duncan and Siobhan Maher Kennedy. The bulk of the recording was finished in two weeks, with Miller overdubbing Alison Krauss's vocal parts on "The Snow Goose" later on.

The tracks were recorded on 16-track tape before being digitized for further manipulation in Pro-Tools.

== Release ==
Following its release, the album peaked at number 16 on the UK Album Chart and number 75 on the Billboard 200, making it then the highest-charting solo album of Thompson's career in either country. (In the UK this was overtaken by 2015's Still, which reached number 10.)

== Track listing ==
All songs written by Richard Thompson, except "So Ben Mi Ch'a Bon Temp" (written by Vecchi, arranged by Thompson):

1. "Stony Ground" – 4:42
2. "Salford Sunday" – 4:08
3. "Sally B" – 4:04
4. "Stuck on the Treadmill" – 4:20
5. "My Enemy" – 5:37
6. "Good Things Happen To Bad People" – 5:21
7. "Where's Home?" – 3:30
8. "Another Small Thing in Her Favour" – 5:06
9. "Straight And Narrow" – 4:13
10. "The Snow Goose" – 5:06
11. "Saving The Good Stuff For You" – 3:54

A Deluxe Edition with a bonus disc was also made available. The bonus disc contains four outtakes from the 'Electric' sessions and three additional tracks from other Thompson albums

1. "Will You Dance, Charlie Boy"
2. "I Found A Stray"
3. "The Rival"
4. "The Tic-Tac Man"
5. "Auldie Riggs" (from Cabaret Of Souls)
6. "Auldie Riggs Dance" (from Cabaret Of Souls)
7. "So Ben Mi Ch'a Bon Tempo" (from 1000 Years of Popular Music)

== Personnel ==
Musical

- Richard Thompson – vocals, guitar, mandolin, hurdy-gurdy, accordion, electronic organ
- Michael Jerome – drums, vocals
- Taras Prodaniuk – electric bass guitar, vocals, mandocello
- Buddy Miller – guitar
- Siobhan Maher Kennedy – backing vocals on tracks 2, 5, 7, 9 and 11
- Stuart Duncan – fiddle
- Alison Krauss – backing vocals on track 10
- Dennis Crouch – bass
- Debra Dobkin – percussion on tracks 2–5 and 2–6

Technical

- Buddy Miller – mixing, production
- Mike Poole – recording
- Ray Kennedy – mastering
- George Ingram – mastering for vinyl edition
