= Hippies, Thugs and Heroes =

Studio album by Richard Thompson
- Released: 16 October 2026
- Length: 51:01
- Label: New West
- Producers: James Frazee; Richard Thompson

Richard Thompson chronology
Ship to Shore (2024)	Hippies, Thugs and Heroes (2026)

Singles from Hippies, Thugs and Heroes
- 1. "Cocaine Walking, Booze Talking" Released: 28 July 2026

Hippies, Thugs and Heroes is the twentieth studio album by the British musician Richard Thompson. It was released on 16 October 2026, through New West Records. The album was recorded with producer James Frazee in Weehawken, New Jersey. Musicians accompanying Thompson include Taras Prodaniuk (bass), Michael Jerome (drums), David Mansfield (guitar and fiddle) and his wife Zara Phillips on backing vocals. The album's first single is "Cocaine Walking, Booze Talking", described by Pitchfork as a "raucous bar-rock ditty".

== Track listing ==
All tracks are written by Richard Thompson.

Hippies, Thugs and Heroes track listing
No.	Title	Length
1.	"Sorcerer's Apprentice"	3:45
2.	"Cocaine Walking, Booze Talking"	4:16
3.	"Pauper's Grave"	5:37
4.	"Unsung Hero"	5:06
5.	"Make Believe You Don't Know Me"	4:14
6.	"She Burns It All"	4:04
7.	"Everybody's Stealing"	4:30
8.	"The Soul in Me"	3:26
9.	"Pipe Dreams"	3:48
10.	"The Big Smoke"	3:43
11.	"Stringer"	5:24
12.	"Siren"	3:08
Total length:		51:01

== Personnel ==
Credits are adapted from Tidal.

- Richard Thompson – vocals, guitar, harmonium, mandolin, organ, production
- James Frazee – production, engineering, mastering
- David Mansfield – acoustic guitar, electric guitar, fiddle
- John Kirkpatrick – accordion
- John Sherman – accordion
- Zara Phillips – background vocals
- Taras Prodaniuk – bass
- Steven Bernstein – cornet
- Tony Kadleck – cornet
- Michael Jerome – drums
- Michael Davis – trombone
- Marcus Rojas – tuba

== Charts ==
Chart performance for Hippies, Thugs and Heroes
Chart (2026)	Peak position
Belgian Albums (Ultratop Flanders)	74
Swedish Physical Albums (Sverigetopplistan)	15
Scottish Albums (Official Charts)	6
UK Albums (Official Charts)	40
UK Americana Albums (Official Charts)	3
UK Independent Albums (Official Charts)	4
US Top Album Sales (Billboard)	32
