= Watching the Dark =

Compilation album by Richard Thompson
- Released: 1993
- Genre: Rock
- Length: 2:04:11
- Label: Hannibal
- Producer: Edward Haber

Richard Thompson chronology
Rumor And Sigh (1991)	Watching the Dark (1993)	Mirror Blue (1994)

Professional ratings
Review scores
Source	Rating
AllMusic	4.5/5 stars
Encyclopedia of Popular Music	5/5 stars

Watching the Dark is an album by Richard Thompson released in 1993. The three-CD retrospective set was compiled with Thompson's co-operation and consent. It runs from 1969, when Thompson was a member of Fairport Convention, through to 1992. However, it is not sequenced in chronological order.

Thompson had been reluctant to look backwards at his career and dig through the archives, but he decided that someone was bound to assemble such a set, so he might as well collaborate with them if possible. He had right of veto over the selections and recorded one track ("Poor Wee Jockey Clark") especially for the project. About a third of the selections are live, and five had never been included in any official Thompson release. Some of the material was donated by collectors of Thompson recordings.

Notable inclusions are

- A live version of "Can't Win" with an extended guitar solo
- "From Galway to Graceland", a Thompson song that had never made it onto a commercial Thompson release
- A live version of "A Heart Needs a Home" from 1975
- Solo, live versions of "Jennie" and "Devonside"
- An unreleased recording, thought to have been lost, of "A Sailor's Life" by Fairport Convention
- Three tracks from the unreleased, Gerry Rafferty-produced version of the Shoot Out the Lights album

The set includes a booklet with details of each recording, some rare photographs and essays by Greil Marcus and Leslie Berman.

== Track listing ==
All songs are written by Richard Thompson except where noted otherwise.

=== Disc A ===
1. "A Man in Need"
2. "Can't Win"
3. "Waltzing's for Dreamers"
4. "Crash the Party"
5. "I Still Dream"
6. "Bird in God's Garden"/"Lost and Found" (Hakim Conrad Archuletta/Fred Frith)
7. "Now Be Thankful" (Dave Swarbrick, Thompson)
8. "A Sailor's Life" (Traditional; arranged by Sandy Denny, Thompson, Simon Nicol, Ashley Hutchings and Martin Lamble)
9. "Genesis Hall"
10. "The Knife-Edge"
11. "Walking on a Wire"
12. "Small Town Romance"
13. "The Shepherd's March"/"Maggie Cameron" (Traditional; arranged by Richard Thompson)
14. "Wall of Death"

=== Disc B ===
1. "For Shame of Doing Wrong"
2. "Back Street Slide"
3. "Strange Affair"
4. "The Wrong Heartbeat"
5. "Borrowed Time"
6. "From Galway to Graceland"
7. "Tear Stained Letter"
8. "Keep Your Distance"
9. "Bogie's Bonnie Belle" (Traditional; arranged by Richard Thompson)
10. "Poor Wee Jockey Clark" (Traditional; arranged by Richard Thompson)
11. "Jet Plane in a Rocking Chair "
12. "Dimming of the Day"
13. "Old Man Inside a Young Man"
14. "Never Again"
15. "Hokey Pokey (The Ice Cream Song)"
16. "A Heart Needs a Home"
17. "Beat the Retreat"

=== Disc C ===
1. "Al Bowlly's in Heaven"
2. "Walking Through a Wasted Land"
3. "When the Spell Is Broken"
4. "Devonside"
5. "Little Blue Number"
6. "I Ain't Going to Drag My Feet No More"
7. "Withered and Died"
8. "Nobody's Wedding"
9. "The Poor Ditching Boy"
10. "The Great Valerio"
11. "Twisted"
12. "The Calvary Cross"
13. "Jennie"
14. "Hand of Kindness"
15. "Two Left Feet "
16. "Shoot Out the Lights"

== Sources ==
- Richard Thompson - The Biography by Patrick Humphries. Schirmer Books. 0-02-864752-1
