= The Old Kit Bag =

Studio album by Richard Thompson
- Released: 25 February 2003
- Recorded: 2002
- Studio: Capitol Studio B (Hollywood)
- Genre: Folk rock, contemporary folk
- Length: 58:45
- Label: Cooking Vinyl
- Producer: John Chelew

Richard Thompson chronology
Semi-Detached Mock Tudor (2002)	The Old Kit Bag (2003)	More Guitar (2003)

Professional ratings
Aggregate scores
Source	Rating
Metacritic	81/100
Review scores
Source	Rating
AllMusic	4/5 stars
Encyclopedia of Popular Music	4/5 stars
Rolling Stone	3/5 stars

"Gethsemane"
Gethsemane (sample)

The Old Kit Bag is the eleventh studio album by British folk rock singer-songwriter and guitarist Richard Thompson, released in 2003 on the Cooking Vinyl label.

== Background ==
The title refers to the World War I marching song "Pack Up Your Troubles in Your Old Kit-Bag". When asked if the album had a theme, Thompson had no immediate answer, then said "I suppose the title is a theme of sorts. It's a reference to the old World War I song, 'Pack up your troubles in your old kit bag,' which is about smiling and whistling a happy tune as the Germans rain shells down on you."

After years of being a prestigious but small-selling signing with a big label, Thompson signed with the small, independent and independently-minded Cooking Vinyl label in 2002. The first fruits of this new partnership was The Old Kit Bag.

Thompson had financed the recording himself and relied on his new label for marketing and distribution ("I should have started doing that years ago because it means you own your own recordings").

The album is markedly different from its predecessors, with unobtrusive production by John Chelew and a smaller set of backing musicians ("the idea was to keep it small. I did do a few overdubs – second guitar, dulcimer, single-finger keyboard parts, all the easy stuff – but other than that, everything was pretty much a live performance"). Thompson's electric guitar playing is more prominent than it had been for some time on a studio album.

Despite the stripped down arrangements and sound, the album is stylistically diverse with Thompson even making a rare excursion into the blues on "I've Got No Right To Have It All". As is often the case with Thompson, the lyrics reflect darker side of life: "Gethsemane" deals with the disillusionment and pressure that follows an idyllic childhood, and "Outside Of The Inside" (which Thompson introduced on tour as "a song about how the Taliban see the West").

The live album Ducknapped! was recorded during the 2003 tour to support the album and was released on Thompson's boutique Beeswing label. Nine of The Old Kit Bag's twelve songs are included.

== Reception ==
The move to a much smaller record label bought a bigger marketing push and healthier sales. Thompson had engineered a situation where live shows were his major revenue stream, but now The Old Kit Bag did better on release than any other Thompson album since Rumor And Sigh, entering the Billboard 200 and entering Billboard's "Indie" chart at number 5.

Reviewing the album for BBC Music in 2003, Chris Jones said of Thompson, "Now he returns with another text ripped from the pages of suffering and heartache, but more importantly, the guitar is aflame once more. ... Inexplicably split into two halves: 'The Haunted Keepsake' and 'The Pilgrim's Fancy', this collection of Unguents, fig leaves and tourniquets for the soul may come with a standard 'olde worlde' folk sleeve but is full of Thompson's skill in taking a contemporary subject matter and placing it within a story-telling tradition."

== Track listing ==
All songs written by Richard Thompson

=== Chapter 1: The Haunted Keepsake ===
1. "Gethsemane"
2. "Jealous Words"
3. "I'll Tag Along"
4. "A Love You Can't Survive"
5. "One Door Opens"
6. "First Breath"

=== Chapter 2: The Pilgrims Fancy ===
7. "She Said It Was Destiny"
8. "I've Got No Right To Have It All"
9. "Pearly Jim"
10. "Word Unspoken, Sight Unseen"
11. "Outside Of The Inside"
12. "Happy Days And Auld Lang Syne"

== Personnel ==
=== Musicians ===
- Richard Thompson – electric guitar, acoustic guitar, mandolin, accordion, harmonium and vocals
- Judith Owen – backing vocals
- Danny Thompson – double bass
- Michael Jerome – drums, percussion and backing vocals

=== Technical ===
- John Chelew – producer
- Jimmy Hoyson – recorder, mixer
- Mike Glines – assistant engineer
- Tornado design – package design
- Nancy Nimoy – illustrations
- Ron Slenzak+Associates – photography

== Other sources ==
- Richard Thompson – The Biography, Patrick Humphries, Schirmer Books ISBN 0-02-864752-1
- The Great Valerio, Dave Smith
