= Richard Thompson (musician) =

English singer-songwriter and guitarist (born 1949)

Richard Thompson OBE
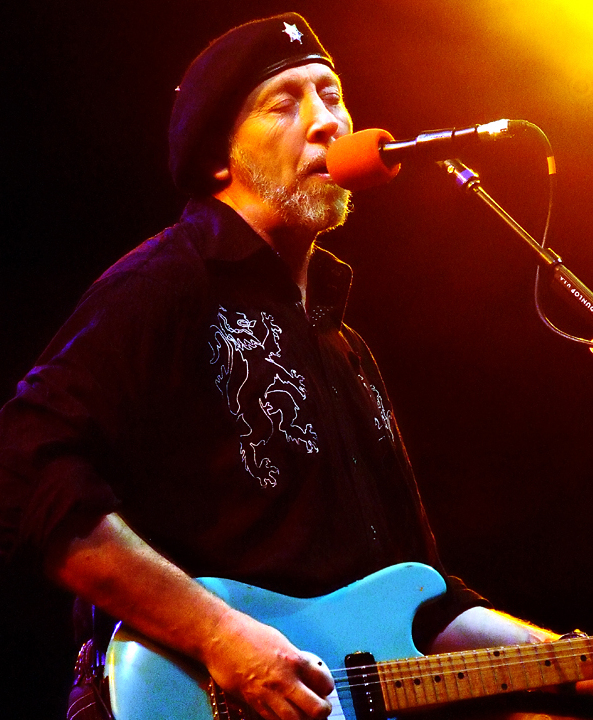
- Thompson performing in 2007

Background information
- Born: Richard John Thompson; 3 April 1949 (age 77); Notting Hill, London, England
- Genres: Folk rock; folk
- Occupations: Singer; songwriter; musician
- Instruments: Vocals; guitar; bass guitar; mandolin; accordion; dulcimer; hurdy-gurdy
- Years active: 1967–present
- Labels: Island; Elixir; Hannibal; Polydor; Capitol; Cooking Vinyl; Proper; Beeswing; New West
- Member of: Thompson
- Formerly of: Fairport Convention; The Bunch; The GP's
- Spouses: Linda Thompson (m. 1972; div. 1982); Nancy Covey (m. 1985; div. 2019); Zara Phillips (m. 2021)
- Website: richardthompson-music.com
- Family: Teddy Thompson (son); Kamila Thompson (daughter); Zak Hobbs (grandson)

Richard Thompson (born 3 April 1949) is an English songwriter, musician (primarily a guitarist), singer and record producer.

Thompson first gained prominence in the late 1960s as the lead guitarist and a songwriter for the folk rock group Fairport Convention, which he co-founded in 1967. After departing the group in 1971, Thompson released his debut solo album, Henry the Human Fly, in 1972. The next year, he formed a duo with his wife, Linda Thompson, which produced six albums, including the critically acclaimed I Want to See the Bright Lights Tonight (1974) and Shoot Out the Lights (1982). After the dissolution of the duo, Thompson revived his solo career with the release of Hand of Kindness in 1983. He has released 20 solo studio albums. Three of these —Rumor and Sigh (1991), You? Me? Us? (1996), and Dream Attic (2010)—have been nominated for Grammy Awards, while Still (2015) was his first UK Top Ten album. He continues to write and record new material and has frequently performed at venues throughout Europe and North America, and occasionally further afield.

Music critic Neil McCormick described Thompson as "a versatile virtuoso guitarist and a sharp observational singer-songwriter whose work burns with intelligence and dark emotion". His songwriting has earned him an Ivor Novello Award and, in 2006, a lifetime achievement award from BBC Radio. His 1991 song "1952 Vincent Black Lightning" was included in Time magazine's "All-TIME 100 Songs" list of the best English-language musical compositions released between 1923 and 2011. Thompson was appointed Officer of the Order of the British Empire (OBE) in the 2011 New Year Honours for services to music. Many varied musicians have recorded Thompson's compositions.

His memoir, Beeswing: Losing My Way and Finding My Voice, 1967–1975, was published in 2021.

== Early life and career (1949 to 1972) ==
Richard Thompson was born at 23 Ladbroke Crescent (off Ladbroke Grove), Notting Hill, West London, England. His father, a Scot, was a Scotland Yard detective and an amateur guitar player; several other family members had played music professionally. He was the younger brother, by five years, of sister Perri, who became a fashion designer. While attending William Ellis School in Highgate, he formed his first band, Emil and the Detectives (named after a book and a movie by the same title), with classmate Hugh Cornwell, later lead singer and guitarist of the Stranglers, on bass guitar. When he was a teenager Thompson moved with his family to Whetstone, near the northern end of the London Underground's Northern line.

Interviewed in 2003, Thompson said:

Listening to Buddy Holly in 1956 was the point at which I wanted to pick up a guitar, although I didn't actually manage to do that until 1960 ... I played Shadows songs in school bands until I started hanging around with the guys that became Fairport Convention, and we would play Bob Dylan, Phil Ochs, Richard Fariña ... the American singer-songwriters. We would go to Dylan's publisher and ask for songs that hadn't been recorded. We were interested in lyrics, and we were pretty idealistic.

Like so many musicians of his generation, Thompson was exposed to and embraced rock and roll music at an early age, and he was also exposed to his father's jazz and traditional Scottish music record collection. His father had seen Django Reinhardt play in Glasgow in the 1930s and played guitar himself. He was later described by his son as "a bad amateur player ... with three chords, though, unfortunately, not C, F and G." All these musical genres were to colour Thompson's playing in the years to come.

American producer Joe Boyd said:

He can imitate almost any style, and often does, but is instantly identifiable. In his playing you can hear the evocation of the Scottish piper's drone and the melody of the chanter as well as echoes of Barney Kessel's and James Burton's guitars and Jerry Lee Lewis's piano. But no blues clichés.

At the age of 18 Thompson co-founded folk rock group Fairport Convention. Largely on the strength of Thompson's playing, Boyd took them under his wing and signed them to his Witchseason production and management company.

Boyd said:

And there was this group of very nice Muswell Hill grammar school boys and a girl playing American music. Leonard Cohen songs, and Richard Fariña songs, and Bob Dylan songs, all being done in a kind of West-Coasty rock style. And then came the guitar solo, and Richard just played the most amazing solo. He played a solo which quotes from Django, from Charlie Christian, you know, an incredibly sophisticated little solo. And that really amazed me, the breadth of his sophistication... and so, you know, at the end of the gig I was in the dressing room saying 'would you guys like to make a record?'

Shortly thereafter Thompson, already acquiring a reputation as an outstanding guitar player, started writing songs seriously. This seems to have been out of necessity as Fairport Convention was at first essentially a cover band.

I remember saying to Ashley [Hutchings, bassist] after a gig, that I was kind of embarrassed about doing the material we were doing, because it seemed that we should have outgrown doing covers – even though it was only 1967 – it somehow wasn't good enough and other bands were writing their own stuff and we should too. I remember being angry and saying to Ashley this isn't good enough, we've got to get some original material... and stuff started to trickle through.

By December 1968, when Fairport's second album What We Did on Our Holidays was released, Thompson was starting to emerge as a songwriter of distinction. As Fairport's lineup and their sound evolved, Thompson continued to grow in stature as a player and as a songwriter with compositions like "Meet on the Ledge".

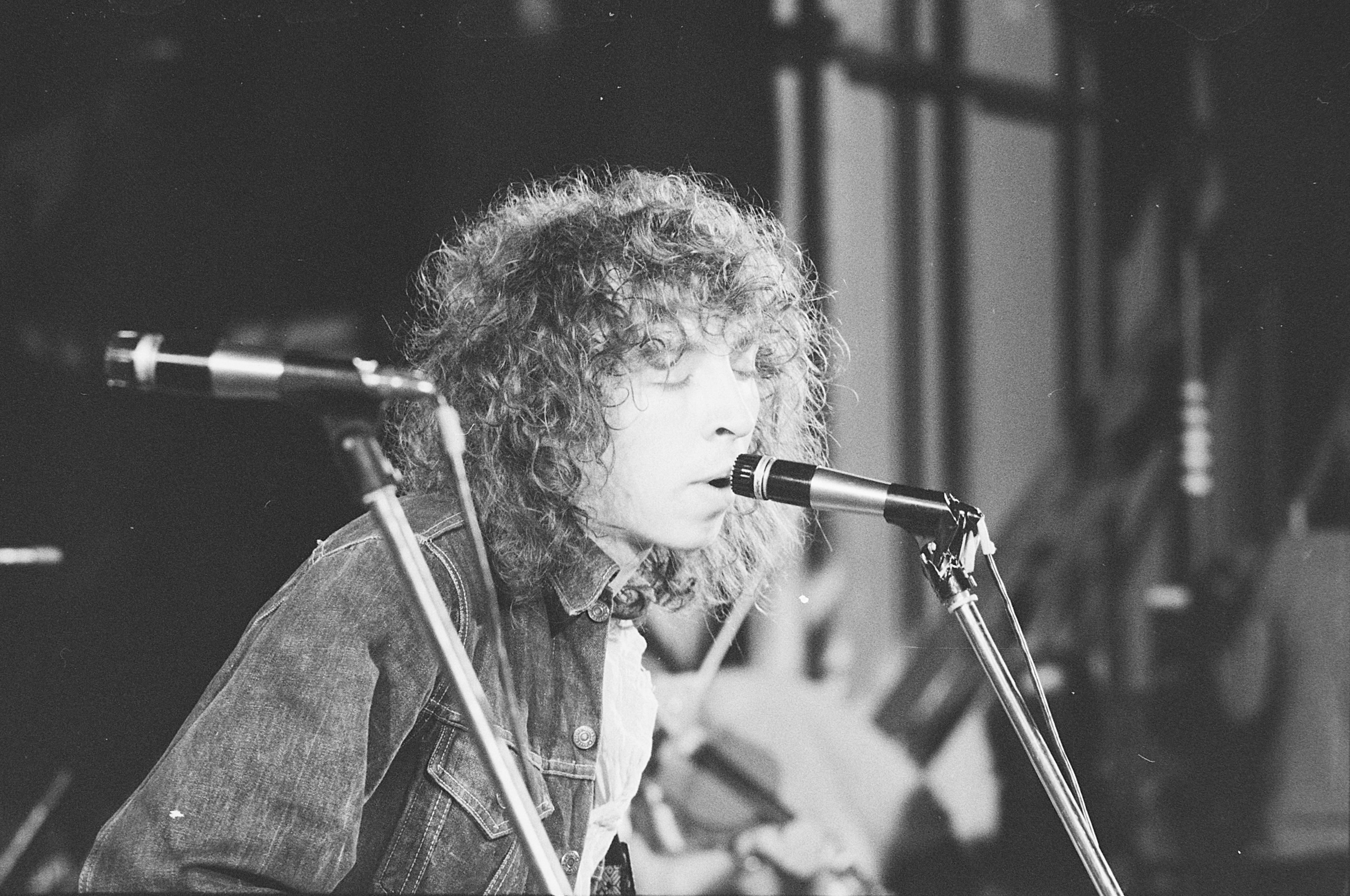
Richard Thompson (Kralingen 1970, with Fairport Convention)

On 12 May 1969, between the recording and release of their next album Unhalfbricking, Fairport's van crashed on the M1 motorway on the way home from a gig at Mothers, a club in Birmingham. Drummer Martin Lamble, aged 19, and Thompson's girlfriend Jeannie Franklyn were killed. The rest of the band suffered injuries of varying severity. Later in 1969, Fairport re-grouped with a new drummer, Dave Mattacks, and also invited the well known fiddle player, Dave Swarbrick, to join. Thompson and Swarbrick worked together to create songs such as "Crazy Man Michael" from the band's seminal 1969 folk-rock album Liege & Lief and "Sloth" from its 1970 follow-up Full House.

In January 1971, Thompson announced that he was leaving Fairport Convention. His decision was instinctive, rather than a calculated career move:

I left Fairport as a gut reaction and didn't really know what I was doing, except writing. I was writing stuff and it seemed interesting and I thought it would be fun to make a record. And at the same time—70–71—I was doing a lot of session work as a way of avoiding any serious ideas about a career.

In April 1972, he released his first solo album Henry the Human Fly, recording with Sandy Denny, Pat Donaldson, Sue Draheim, John Kirkpatrick, Barry Dransfield, Ashley Hutchings, Linda Peters, Andy Roberts, and others. The album sold poorly and was panned by the press, especially the influential Melody Maker magazine. With time Henry has come to be more highly regarded, but at the time the critics' response hurt both Thompson and his career.

== Solo career ==
=== 1970s: Richard and Linda Thompson ===
By the 1970s, Thompson had begun a relationship with the singer Linda Peters, who had sung on Henry the Human Fly. In October 1972 the couple were married at Hampstead Town Hall and honeymooned in Corsica. Thompson, with Linda now effectively his front woman, regrouped for his next album and the next phase of his career.

The first Richard and Linda Thompson album, I Want to See the Bright Lights Tonight, was recorded in May 1973 in short time and on a small budget. Largely because of the petrol shortage in Britain and its impact on the availability of vinyl for records, Bright Lights was held back by Island Records for nearly a year before being released in April 1974. The album was well received by critics, though sales were less than stellar.

Thompson's lyrics expressed a rather dismal world view, and it has been suggested that the bleak subject matter of his songs helped to keep his recordings off the hit parade. A more likely explanation was given by ex-Island A&R man Richard Williams in the 2003 BBC TV documentary Solitary Life: Thompson was just not interested in fame and its trappings.

The Thompsons recorded two more albums—Hokey Pokey and Pour Down Like Silver, both released in 1975—before Richard Thompson decided to leave the music business. The couple moved to a Sufi community in East Anglia.

It was not apparent from their records at first, but the Thompsons had embraced an esoteric Sufi strand of Islam in early 1974. I Want to See the Bright Lights Tonight was recorded before this conversion, but released some time afterwards. The songs for the second Richard and Linda album, Hokey Pokey, were similarly written some time ahead of the album's recording and eventual release. It was Pour Down Like Silver, with its cover photo of a turbaned Richard Thompson, that tipped the public off to the Thompsons' growing preoccupation with their faith.

The trilogy of albums released before and after his sojourn in the commune was heavily influenced by Thompson's beliefs and by Sufi scripture, but in the long run his religious beliefs have not influenced his work in an obvious manner. The outlook expressed in his songs, his musical style, the subjects addressed by his lyrics have not shown any fundamental change. He remains a committed Muslim.

Thompson started to re-engage with the world of professional music in 1977. He played on an album by Sandy Denny, and had undertaken a short tour and started recording with a group of musicians who were also Sufis. Thompson asked Joe Boyd to produce these sessions, and two days were spent on the initial recordings. Boyd recalls that the sessions were not a success: "It was really, I felt, very poor. I didn't have much confidence in the musicians that he was working with. The atmosphere was very strange and it just didn't seem to work."

At about this time the Thompsons and their family moved out of the commune and back to their old home in Hampstead. Boyd had already invited Richard Thompson to play on Julie Covington's debut album. With spare studio time and the American session musicians hired to work on the Covington album available, the Thompsons went back into the studio to record under their own name for the first time in three years.

The resulting album, First Light, was warmly received by critics but did not sell particularly well. Neither did its follow up, 1979's harder-edged and more cynical Sunnyvista. Chrysalis Records did not take up their option to renew the contract, and the Thompsons found themselves without one.

=== 1980s ===
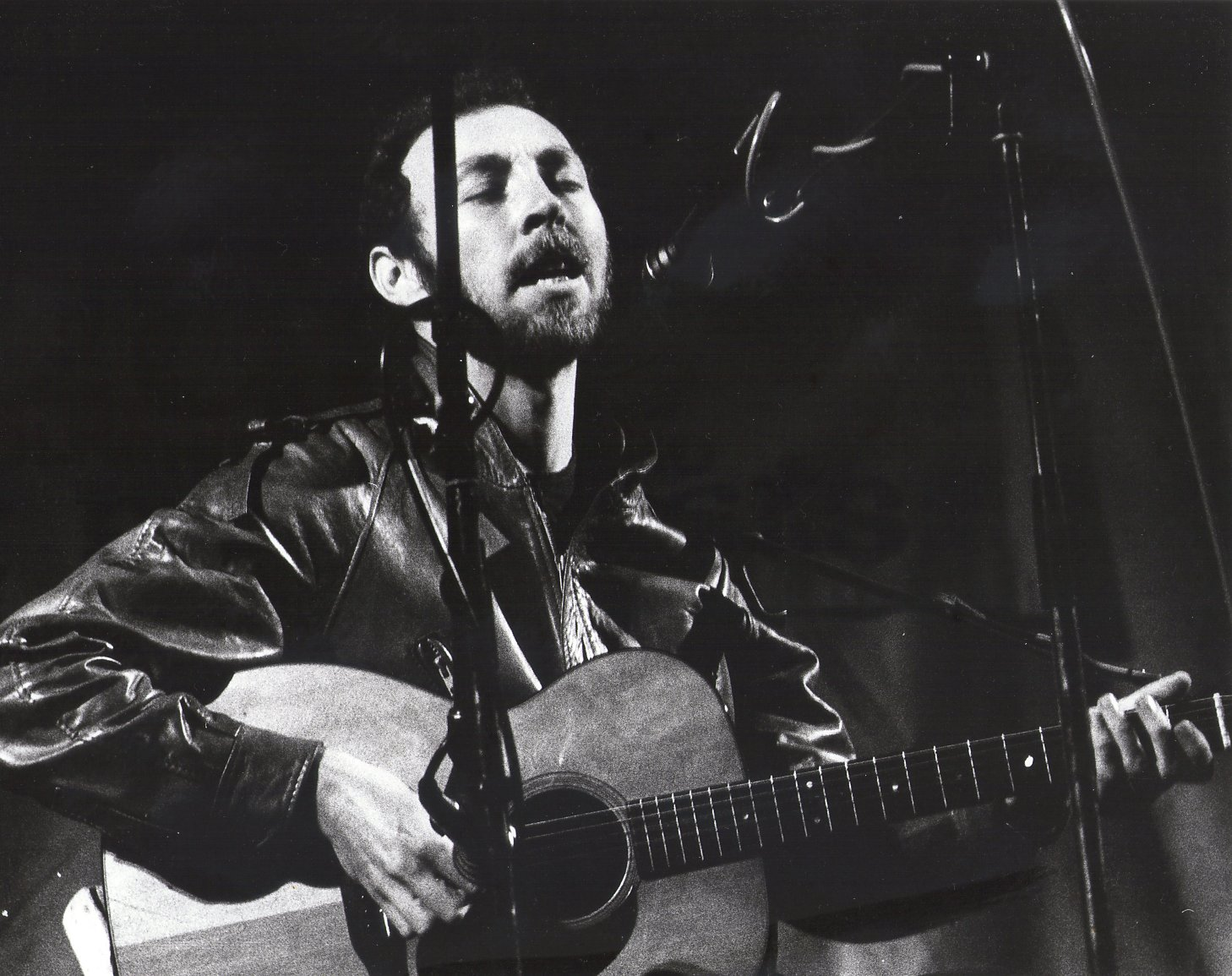
Thompson performing solo on stage at the Leeds Folk Festival, 1982

Gerry Rafferty had booked the Thompsons as the support act for his 1980 tour, and had also used Richard as a session player on his Night Owl (1979) album. Rafferty offered to finance the recording of a new Richard and Linda Thompson album which he would then use to secure a contract for the Thompsons. Richard Thompson fell out with Rafferty during this project and was not happy with the finished product. Nevertheless, Rafferty kept his side of the bargain and presented the album to several record companies – none of which expressed interest in signing the Thompsons. Rafferty did not recover his investment.

About a year later, Joe Boyd signed the Thompsons to his small Hannibal label and a new album was recorded. Shoot Out the Lights included new recordings of many of the songs recorded in 1980. Linda Thompson was pregnant at the time of the recording, so the album's release was delayed until they could tour behind the album. Breathing problems arising from her pregnancy also meant that Linda could not sing the lead part on some of these songs as she had done on demo tapes and the Rafferty-produced recordings.

As an interim measure, Richard Thompson agreed to a short (5-day), low-key solo tour of the U.S. This tour was set up by Nancy Covey, then concert director for McCabe's Guitar Shop in Santa Monica. Covey, who had been in the UK in 1981 trying to sign Thompson to play at McCabe's, arranged for Thompson well-received 5 and 6 December shows. It was during this tour that Thompson and Covey developed an intimate relationship, and during that month, Richard and Linda Thompson separated.

Upon its release in 1982, Shoot Out the Lights was lauded by critics and sold quite well – especially in the U.S.

The Thompsons, now a couple for professional purposes only, toured the United States in support of the album, their only American tour together. Both the album and their live shows were well received by the American media, and Shoot Out the Lights effectively relaunched their career – just as their marriage was falling apart. The performances, with a backing band including both Simon Nicol and Dave Mattacks of Fairport Convention, were seen as strong, but the tension between Richard and Linda was all too obvious. For this reason, the Thompsons' fans often refer to the Shoot Out the Lights tour as "The Tour from Hell". Upon returning home, Richard and Linda went their separate ways.

Richard Thompson continued recording as a solo artist. His 1983 album Hand of Kindness saw him working with Boyd again, but with a revised backing band and a more extroverted and up-tempo song selection.

With his separation from Linda finalized, Richard Thompson began to commute between twin bases in London and Los Angeles and to tour regularly in the USA. Encouraged by the success of his solo shows in late 1981 and early 1982, he began to perform solo with increasing frequency and continued to tour with a band. In 1983 and 1984, he toured the US and Europe with the Richard Thompson Big Band, which included two saxophone players in addition to the more usual rhythm section, second guitar and accordion. Set lists included covers of classic rock 'n roll songs and jazz standards such as "Tuxedo Junction".

In 1985, Thompson signed with PolyGram and received a sizeable advance. He and Nancy Covey married at an alcohol-free wedding that included a who's who of roots-music performers who Covey knew well from McCabe's and the Los Angeles music scene, and had introduced to Thompson. After their wedding, Thompson moved his home and working base to California. As part of the settlement that allowed Thompson to leave Boyd's Hannibal label for Polygram, the live album Small Town Romance was released. This comprised recordings made during Thompson's solo shows in the US in late 1981 and early 1982. Across a Crowded Room (1985) was his last album to be recorded in England and the last to have Boyd as producer. Thompson put together a new look backing band for the tour to promote this album, and some shows were filmed for a live video release (see Richard Thompson discography).

In 1986, he released Daring Adventures, which was recorded in Los Angeles and produced by Mitchell Froom. Daring Adventures, with a rich sound, markedly different production and use of American session players, was perceived by some as evidence of Thompson's increasing "Americanisation". Perhaps more significantly, the album continued the trend, begun with Across A Crowded Room, of Thompson's songs moving away from the seemingly personal material and towards the character sketches and narratives for which he has since become famous. Froom and PolyGram had plans to target college and the growing "alternative" markets with Daring Adventures. Sales improved, but not substantially. Polygram declined an option to renew the contract. Thompson's management negotiated a new deal with Capitol Records.

In 1985, Fairport Convention reformed and recorded the album Gladys' Leap. Thompson did not rejoin Fairport, but he did contribute a song to the project and played guitar on another track on the album.

1988 saw the release of Thompson's first album for Capitol, Amnesia. Froom was retained as producer, and once again the album was recorded in Los Angeles with many of the same players that Froom had called upon for the Daring Adventures sessions.

=== 1990s ===
Thompson contributed music to BBC Northwest's documentary Hard Cash and appears on the eponymous accompanying album issued by Topic. A track from the album, Time To Ring Some Changes is included in the 2009 Topic Records 70-year anniversary boxed set Three Score and Ten as track thirteen on the sixth CD.

Thompson appears on Willie Nile's 1991 Places I Have Never Been album.

In 1991, Thompson recorded Rumor and Sigh, his second album for Capitol. Once again Froom produced. This album, particularly the acoustic guitar ballad "1952 Vincent Black Lightning", was hailed by critics and fans alike and greatly advanced Thompson's reputation as a leading traditional-style guitarist.

Rumor and Sigh was nominated for a Grammy and sold well. However, a shake-up at Capitol saw Hale Milgrim (Thompson's champion and fan within the boardroom) replaced by Garry Gersh. Thus, Thompson's next album Mirror Blue was held back for almost a year before being released.

Thompson was awarded the Orville H. Gibson Award for best acoustic guitar player in 1997.

In 1992, he performed with David Byrne. Their joint acoustic concert at St. Ann & The Holy Trinity in Brooklyn Heights, New York on 24 March, produced the album An Acoustic Evening, which was released the same year.

Mirror Blue was released in 1994, to often negative reviews sparked by the production decisions that Thompson and Froom took. Thompson took to the road to promote the album. He was joined by drummer Dave Mattacks, Danny Thompson (no relation) on double bass, and Pete Zorn on acoustic guitar, backing vocals, mandolin and various wind instruments. This line-up toured with Thompson the following two years.

Thompson continued recording for Capitol until 1999, when Mock Tudor was recorded and released. His deal with Capitol was modified so that he could release and directly market limited-quantity, live recorded, not-for-retail albums. The first of these was Live at Crawley, released in 1995.

In 1994 the tribute album Beat the Retreat was issued, with Thompson's songs performed by such artists as R.E.M., June Tabor and David Byrne.

=== 2000s ===
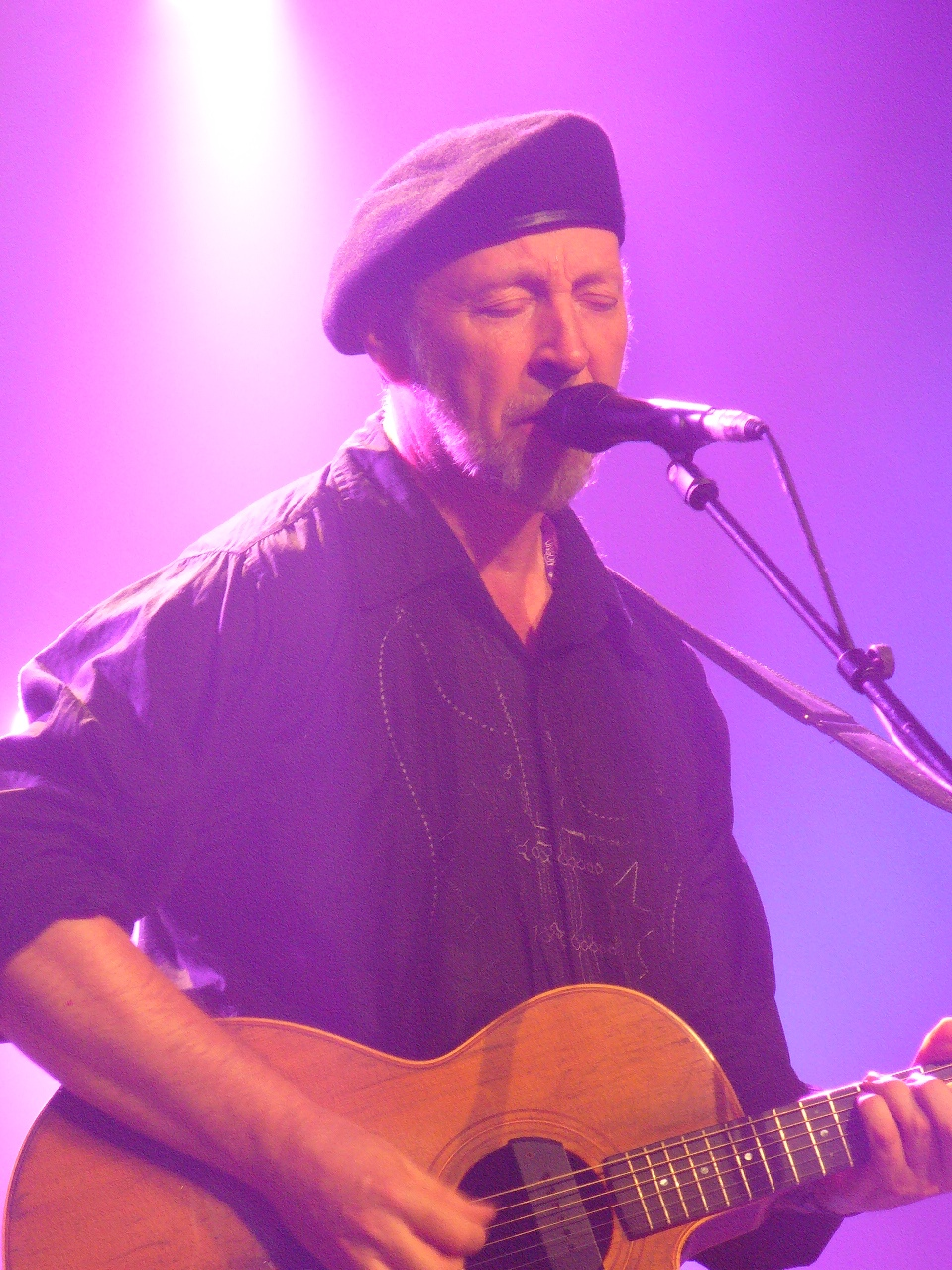
Thompson at the Cambridge Folk Festival, 2006

In 2001, Thompson declined the option to renew his contract with Capitol.

Thompson appeared on his ex-wife Linda's studio album Fashionably Late on the song "Dear Mary". It was the first time the two had recorded together since Shoot Out the Lights.

In 2003, the BBC produced a documentary about Thompson's long musical career, entitled Solitary Life, directed by Paul Bernays and narrated by John Peel. It featured interviews with Thompson from his home in California and contributions from Billy Connolly, Bonnie Raitt, ex-wife Linda Thompson, Harry Shearer and Thompson's then wife Nancy Covey. The programme was re-broadcast by BBC Four in September 2012.

The move away from big labels and big budgets paradoxically brought a bigger marketing push and healthier sales. Thompson's first two self-funded releases, 2003's The Old Kit Bag and 2005's Front Parlour Ballads, did well in the indie charts on both sides of the Atlantic. In May 2007 Thompson released Sweet Warrior. The album was licensed to different labels in different territories: Shout! Factory in the US, P-Vine in Japan, Planet Records in Australia, and Proper Records in the UK and Europe. In August of the same year Island released a live Richard and Linda Thompson album, compiled from recordings made during the November 1975 tour to promote the Pour Down Like Silver album.

Thompson continued releasing "official bootlegs" on his boutique label as an additional source of revenue – all live recordings.

=== 2010s ===
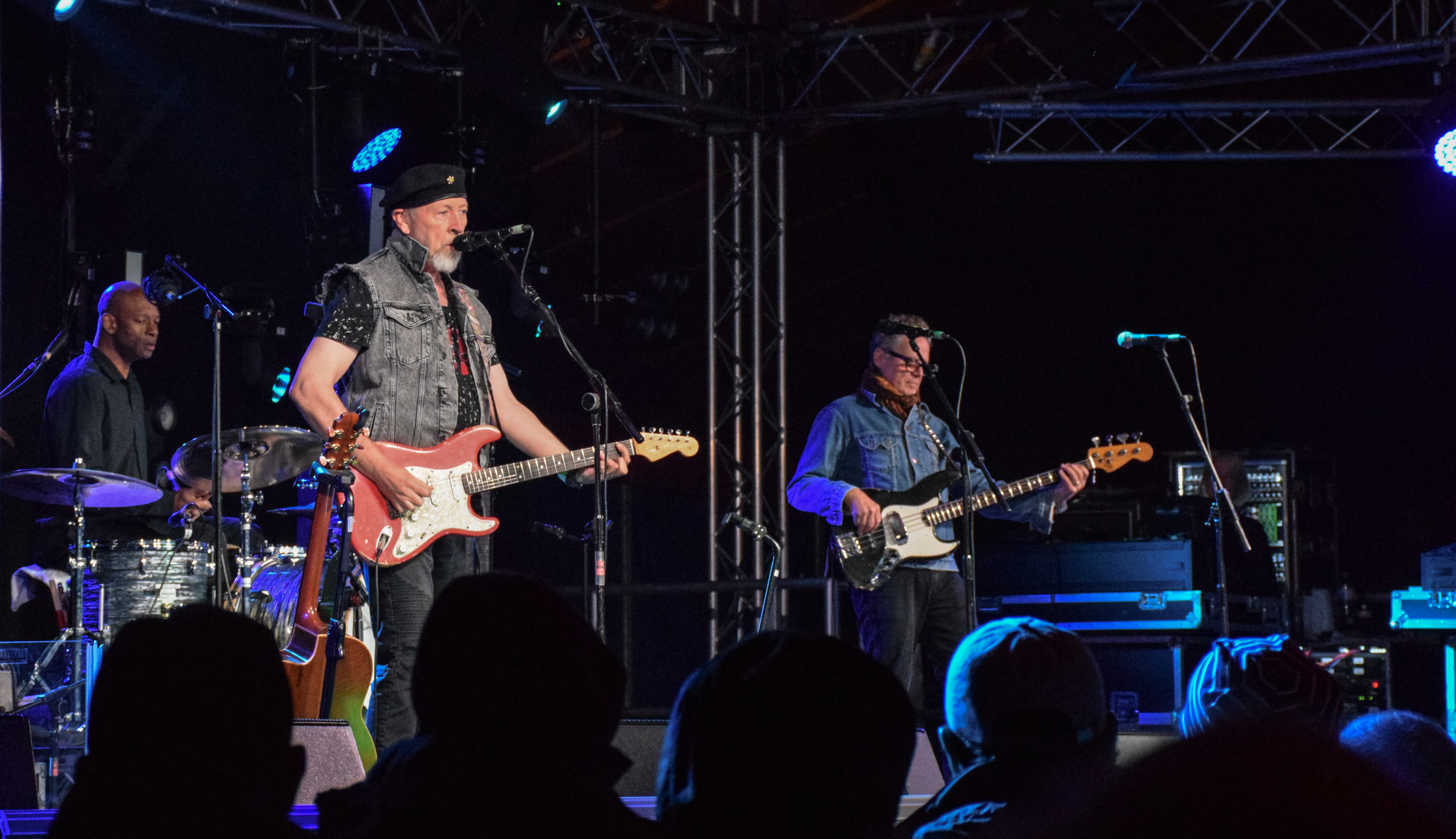
The Richard Thompson Electric Trio (with Michael Jerome and Taras Prodaniuk) at Towersey Festival, 2018

In early 2010, Thompson assembled a band and did a string of shows showcasing new material. The aim was to record the new material in a live setting. The recording and touring band consisted of Thompson, Pete Zorn, (acoustic guitar, flute, saxophone, mandolin, vocals); Michael Jerome (drums, vocals), Taras Prodaniuk, (bass guitar, vocals); and Joel Zifkin, (electric violin, mandolin, vocals). The resulting album Dream Attic, released in August the same year, was nominated for a Grammy Award for Best Contemporary Folk Album.

On 10 June 2010, Thompson was awarded the Mojo Les Paul Award for "Guitar Legend".

Thompson curated the 2010 Meltdown Festival at London's South Bank Centre. The festival included a tribute to the recently deceased Kate McGarrigle, a feature of which was a rare reunion of Richard and Linda Thompson. He was appointed Officer of the Order of the British Empire (OBE) in the 2011 New Year Honours for services to music. On 5 July 2011, he was awarded an honorary doctorate by the University of Aberdeen.

In early 2013, Thompson released Electric, recorded in Nashville with Buddy Miller producing. The record enjoyed good reviews and debuted in the UK top 20. Thompson took to the road with a stripped-down "power trio" band on a multi-month tour on both sides of the Atlantic to promote the new album. Also that year Thompson appeared on his ex-wife Linda's fourth studio album Won't Be Long Now, on the track "Love's for Babies and Fools". It was the second time the two have recorded together since Shoot Out the Lights.

In 2014, Thompson released Acoustic Classics, an album featuring acoustic renditions of 14 songs from his back catalogue, on his Beeswing label. The record reached number 16 on the UK Albums Chart. Thompson appears alongside family members, both blood related and by marriage, on the album Family (2014) by Thompson (the band being named for all the Thompsons that appear), performing two songs solo and contributing to others as well. The album was produced by son Teddy Thompson and features ex-wife Linda Thompson, The Rails who are Thompson's daughter Kami Thompson and her husband James Walbourne, as well as other related musicians, including Walbourne's brother and Richard Thompson's son from his second marriage.

Thompson released Still in June 2015, an album produced by Jeff Tweedy of Wilco and recorded in Tweedy's The Loft Studio. The album reached number 10 in the UK Album chart, his first album to reach the UK top 10. In September 2015, he appeared on BBC Two's Later... with Jools Holland, where he performed "All Buttoned Up" and ""She Never Could Resist a Winding Road" from his album Still. This was followed, in 2017, by a second acoustic album Acoustic Classics II which reached number 24 on the UK Albums Chart. and Acoustic Rarities, an album of new recordings of some of the more obscure songs in the Thompson catalogue, some previously existing only as cover versions.

Thompson's eighteenth studio album, 13 Rivers, was released on 14 September 2018. It was written after a period of difficulty for Thompson's family with songs that stick "close to a vision of darkness, gloom, and noise". Thompson produced the record himself at Boulevard Recording in Los Angeles. On 30 September 2019 Thompson played at the Royal Albert Hall to celebrate his 70th birthday.

In July 2019 Thompson was featured in the BBC Four documentary Classic Albums: The Crickets: The 'Chirping' Crickets, explaining the influence that Buddy Holly had had on him personally, and on the development of rock and roll in general.

=== 2020s ===
In 2021 his book Beeswing: Losing My Way and Finding My Voice, 1967–1975 was published by Algonquin Books, mainly a memoir of his life as a musician from 1967 to 1975. The Los Angeles Review of Books called it an "absorbing, witty, often deliciously biting read, as all rock memoirs should be".

Thompson performed on the acoustic stage of the Glastonbury Festival in June 2023. Reviewing the set for The Guardian, Keza MacDonald said, "It's just him and a beautiful, bright-sounding acoustic guitar. He plays so well that you can't take your eyes off his picking hand, as you try to figure out how he's making the sound of three guitars come out of one. He is one of the most stunningly gifted guitarists you'll ever see live, and his dextrously fingerpicked mid-song diversions prompt claps and whoops from a crowd that is otherwise quietly reverent."

In January 2024 Thompson announced a band tour of the U.S. and U.K., with the British leg culminating in a date at London's Royal Albert Hall on 8 June. Ship to Shore was released that May. Reviewing the concert at the Glasgow Royal Concert Hall for The Times, Peter Ross awarded the gig four stars and said, "There were flashes of brilliance, however. "Guns Are the Tongues", with Hobbs on mandolin, built over seven minutes to an ecstatic darkness. "Dimming of the Day" had a gentle grace. Best of all was "Beeswing", which Thompson performed alone, fingerpicking an acoustic. Intricate and soulful, it's a song in which his technical ability and poetic voice are held in balance. The brief silence that followed said more than any applause could; we knew we'd heard something exquisite." The final night, at the Royal Albert Hall, featured guest artists including Ralph McTell, James Walbourne, Kami Thompson, Linda Thompson, Squeeze, Danny Thompson and Crowded House. On 9 August Thompson headlined the second night of the annual Cropredy Festival.

In 2020 the 1969 album Dudu Phukwana and the "Spears", the debut album by South African saxophonist Dudu Pukwana and his band, produced by Joe Boyd, was remastered and reissued by Matsuli Music as a double-LP set with nine previously unissued tracks that were recorded in 1969, and which feature a number of guest artists such as Thompson and Simon Nicol.

In October 2023 Thompson released the instrumental "Lament For Mariupol" as part of the charity compilation album Heal the Sky which aimed to raise funds to help children who were victims of the war in Ukraine.

On 7 July 2024 Thompson was the guest of Michael Berkeley for his BBC Radio 3 programme Private Passions, where his choices included Beethoven, Purcell, Britten and Manuel de Falla.

In June 2025 Thompson was forced to withdraw from performing at the Gate To Southwell Festival after falling and breaking three ribs.

In July 2026, Thompson released "Cocaine Walking, Booze Talking" as a single for his album Hippies, Thugs and Heroes, which was subsequently released on 16 October 2026.

=== Side projects and collaborations ===
In between leaving Fairport Convention in early 1971 and releasing his debut solo album in 1972, he undertook a large amount of session work, most notably on albums by John Martyn, Al Stewart, Matthews Southern Comfort, Sandy Denny, Mike Heron and Nick Drake.

During the same period, he also worked on two collaborative projects. Morris On was recorded with Ashley Hutchings, John Kirkpatrick, Dave Mattacks and Barry Dransfield, and was a collection of English traditional tunes arranged for electric instruments. The Bunch were almost the reverse conceptually – a grouping of English folk rock musicians (including Sandy Denny, Linda Peters and members of Fairport Convention) recording a selection of classic rock and roll tunes.

Thompson has continued to guest on albums by an array of artists, from Crowded House, Bonnie Raitt and Vivian Stanshall, to Norma Waterson and BeauSoleil and folk artists like Loudon Wainwright III, Cathal McConnell (of The Boys of the Lough) and Bob Davenport. He has also performed and recorded with Teddy Thompson, his son from his marriage to Linda Thompson.

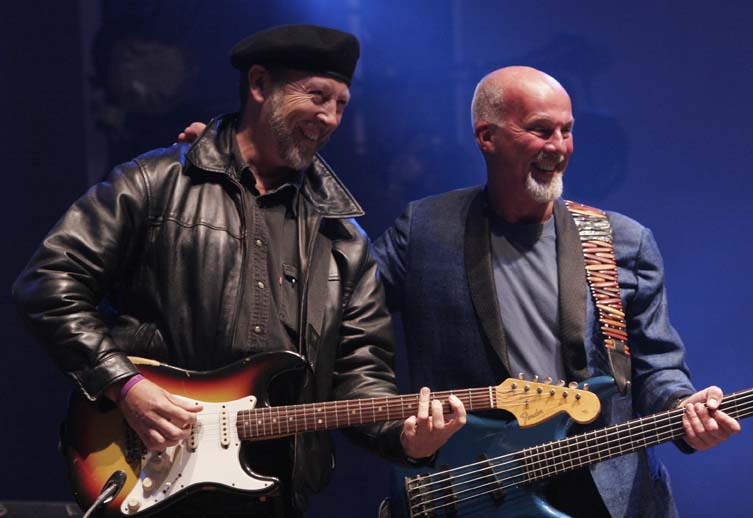
Thompson with Fairport Convention's Dave Pegg at Cropredy, 2005

Since the early 1980s, Thompson has appeared at Fairport Convention's annual Cropredy Festival, both in his own right and as a participant in sets with current and former Fairport members. These sets are seldom confined to performances of songs out of the Thompson or Fairport Convention canons, and in recent years some surprise offerings have included the soul classic "I Heard It Through the Grapevine" (with Thompson backed by the Roy Wood Big Band), The Beatles' "I'm Down" and even "The Lady Is a Tramp".

Thompson has displayed a penchant for the avant garde as well, working with former Pere Ubu singer David Thomas's grouping The Pedestrians on two albums in 1981 and 1982, respectively. In the 1980s, he was associated with a loose-fitting group called The Golden Palominos, who were led by drummer Anton Fier and included at times on stage and on record Jack Bruce, Michael Stipe, Carla Bley, John Lydon, Bill Laswell and others. He has worked with experimental guitarist Henry Kaiser, most notably as part of the ad hoc grouping French Frith Kaiser Thompson with whom he recorded two albums. In 1997 he worked with long-time friend and band member Danny Thompson to record a concept album Industry that dealt with the decline of British industry. A year later he worked with early music expert Philip Pickett on the acclaimed Bones of All Men which fused renaissance tunes with contemporary music.

For several years Thompson devised and toured his show 1000 Years of Popular Music. The inspiration for this came when Playboy asked Thompson (and many other music industry figures) in 1999 for their suggestions for the "top ten songs of the millennium". Guessing that Playboy expected most people's lists to start at around 1950, Thompson took the magazine at its word and presented a list of songs from the 11th century to the present day. Perhaps not surprisingly, Playboy did not use his list, but the exercise gave him the idea for a show which takes a chronological trip through popular music across the ages. Thompson acknowledges that this is an ambitious undertaking, partly because he reckons that he is technically unqualified to sing 98% of the material, and partly because of the sparse musical setting he restricts himself to: besides his acoustic guitar, he's backed by singer/pianist Judith Owen and percussionist/singer Debra Dobkin. A typical performance would start with a medieval round, progress via a Purcell aria, Victorian music hall and Hoagy Carmichael and end with Thompson's take on the Britney Spears hit "Oops!... I Did It Again".

In 2004 Thompson was asked to create the soundtrack music for the Werner Herzog documentary Grizzly Man. The score, which was recorded over a two-day period in December 2004, brought Thompson together with a group of improvisational musicians, mostly from the San Francisco Bay area; video footage from the sessions was edited into a mini-documentary, In the Edges, which was included with the DVD release of Grizzly Man.

In 2009 Thompson was commissioned to write a piece for the International Society of Bassists in honour of Danny Thompson. The resulting Cabaret of Souls, a musical play set in the underworld, has been performed in State College, Pennsylvania, London, and Los Angeles with a cast that includes Harry Shearer, Judith Owen, Debra Dobkin, Pete Zorn, either Danny Thompson or David Piltch, and a 12-piece string section conducted by Peter Askim. This suite was eventually commercially released in late 2012.

In 2006 and 2013, Thompson recorded Hugh S. Roberton's "Mingulay Boat Song" and the traditional "General Taylor" for the sea shanty-compilations Rogue's Gallery: Pirate Ballads, Sea Songs, and Chanteys and Son of Rogues Gallery: Pirate Ballads, Sea Songs & Chanteys.

In July 2019, New West Records released a soundtrack album for the documentary The Cold Blue, featuring the film's original score composed by Thompson. The film, directed by Erik Nelson, focuses on the Eighth Air Force. It uses footage taken by director William Wyler for his 1944 documentary Memphis Belle: A Story of a Flying Fortress.

== Retrospectives and tributes ==
There are a number of retrospective collections of Thompson's work, many containing material which is unavailable elsewhere. 1976's (guitar, vocal) was a collection of unreleased material from the previous eight years of Thompson's appearances on the Island label. The 3-CD set Watching the Dark combines his better-known songs and previously unreleased live and studio tracks. Action Packed is a compilation of tracks from his Capitol releases, plus three hard-to-find songs. Finally, in 2006, the independent label Free Reed released RT- The Life and Music of Richard Thompson, a 5-CD box set consisting almost entirely of previously unreleased performances of songs from throughout Thompson's long career.

Thompson's songs have been extensively covered; for example, Dimming of the Day has been performed by artists such as The Neville Brothers, Bonnie Raitt, Emmylou Harris, David Gilmour, The Blind Boys of Alabama, June Tabor, The Corrs and Alison Krauss & Union Station. There have been several tribute compilations of other artists' interpretations of his work, including: Capitol's Beat the Retreat: Songs by Richard Thompson and Green Linnet's The World Is a Wonderful Place: The Songs of Richard Thompson, both released in 1994.

== Playing style ==
Thompson makes use of the "pick and fingers" technique (sometimes referred to as "hybrid picking") where he plays bass notes and rhythm with a pick between his first finger and thumb, and adds melody and punctuation by plucking the treble strings with his fingers. He also makes use of different guitar tunings, such as (low to high) CGDGBE, DADGBE, DADGAD, and more. This enables him to adapt traditional songs, as on Strict Tempo! and 1000 Years of Popular Music. Thompson occasionally makes use of a thumb-pick, playing in fingerstyle, the most notable example being on the motorcycle ballad "1952 Vincent Black Lightning".

== Guitars ==
=== Electric ===
Thompson is often associated with the Fender Stratocaster guitar. He has made prominent use of Stratocasters, as he has a general preference for the sound of single coil pick-ups.

When I started playing Fenders in 1968, it was unfashionable because everyone in England was playing Gibsons and trying to get a big, fat sound like Eric Clapton had in Cream. I just wanted a little more bite.

Prior to using a Stratocaster with Fairport Convention he used a Gibson Les Paul with P-90 pick-ups. He then switched to a late 60s Stratocaster. Since leaving Fairport Convention he has continued to use electric guitars with single coil pick-ups, most famously a late-1950s Stratocaster but also two custom built electrics by Danny Ferrington as well as other Stratocasters, various Telecaster-type guitars and, in the studio, a Danelectro U2.

As regards effects, he has made significant use of modulation and vibrato type effects pedals, most notably the Univibe and emulations thereof.

Thompson has made intermittent use of Roland's GK-1 pick-up and GL-2 synthesiser over the years. He made use of these devices on 1979's Sunnyvista album and has occasionally used them in concert.

=== Acoustic ===
Since the early 1990s, Thompson has made prominent use of Lowden acoustic guitars for studio and live work; Lowden have made a signature model for him. Before this he used a Martin 000-18 as well as instruments built by Danny Ferrington.

For live work, his acoustic guitars are fitted with a Sunrise pick-up and an internal condenser microphone. The output from the pick-up is usually fed into some effects pedals, typically a delay pedal and a Uni-Vibe.

== Family ==
Thompson had his first son, Jesse, in the early 1970s with American tour booker Liz Gordon after a brief relationship.

In the early 1970s, Thompson began a relationship with the singer Linda Peters, who sang on Thompson's album Henry the Human Fly. In October 1972 the couple were married at Hampstead Town Hall. The couple worked as a duo and have three children: Muna, Teddy and Kamila. Richard and Linda Thompson separated in 1982.

Richard Thompson married Nancy Covey in 1985, and was with Covey until they separated in 2018. Thompson and Covey have a son, Jack Covey Thompson, a musician and visual artist.

In 2021, Richard Thompson married his third wife, the author, actor, singer and songwriter Zara Phillips with whom he lives in New Jersey. They contribute to one another's musical projects.

In 2024 his touring band for the album Ship to Shore included Thompson's grandson (Muna's son) Zak Hobbs.

== Discography ==
- Henry the Human Fly (1972)
- Strict Tempo! (1981)
- Hand of Kindness (1983)
- Across a Crowded Room (1985)
- Daring Adventures (1986)
- Amnesia (1988)
- Rumor and Sigh (1991)
- Mirror Blue (1994)
- You? Me? Us? (1996)
- Mock Tudor (1999)
- The Old Kit Bag (2003)
- Front Parlour Ballads (2005)
- Sweet Warrior (2007)
- Electric (2013)
- Acoustic Classics (2014)
- Still (2015)
- Acoustic Classics II (2017)
- Acoustic Rarities (2017)
- 13 Rivers (2018)
- Ship to Shore (2024)
- Hippies, Thugs and Heroes (2026)

== Books ==
- Thompson, Richard (2021). Beeswing: Losing my Way and Finding my Voice, 1967–1975 (First ed.). Chapel Hill: Algonquin Books. ISBN 978-1-61620-895-0. OCLC 1159043406.
