= The Best of Richard & Linda Thompson: The Island Records Years =

The Best Of: The Island Records Years

Compilation album by Richard and Linda Thompson
- Released: 2000
- Recorded: 1972–1975
- Genre: Rock
- Length: 77:36
- Label: Island
- Producer: Bill Levenson

Richard and Linda Thompson chronology
Shoot Out the Lights (1982)	The Best Of: The Island Records Years (2000)	In Concert, November 1975 (2007)

Professional ratings
Review scores
Source	Rating
AllMusic	4/5 stars

The Best of Richard & Linda Thompson: The Island Records Years is a 2000 compilation album of songs by Richard and Linda Thompson. Island Records issued this compilation as the first step in a program to re-master and re-issue the albums that Richard and Linda Thompson had cut for them.

The tracks are drawn mostly from the duo's three albums for Island: I Want to See the Bright Lights Tonight, Hokey Pokey and Pour Down Like Silver, though two tracks are taken from Richard Thompson's first solo album Henry the Human Fly; there is also an alternate recording of "A Heart Needs a Home" and a live version of "The Calvary Cross" with an extended guitar solo, both of which originally appeared on the 1976 compilation album (guitar, vocal).

This compilation was released in the UK under the name The End of the Rainbow: An Introduction to Richard & Linda Thompson with an identical track listing and similar artwork.

== Track listing ==
All songs written by Richard Thompson

1. "Roll Over Vaughan Williams"
2. "The Poor Ditching Boy"
3. "When I Get to the Border"
4. "Withered and Died"
5. "I Want to See the Bright Lights Tonight"
6. "Down Where the Drunkards Roll"
7. "The End of the Rainbow"
8. "The Great Valerio"
9. "Hokey Pokey"
10. "Never Again"
11. "A Heart Needs a Home"
12. "For Shame of Doing Wrong"
13. "Night Comes In"
14. "Beat the Retreat"
15. "Dimming of the Day"
16. "The Calvary Cross"
