= In Concert, November 1975 =

Live album by Richard and Linda Thompson
- Released: August 13, 2007
- Recorded: November 1975
- Venues: Venues in Oxford, Swindon, and Norwich
- Genre: Folk rock
- Length: 78:09
- Label: Island

Richard and Linda Thompson chronology
The Best of Richard & Linda Thompson: The Island Records Years (2000)	In Concert, November 1975 (2007)

Professional ratings
Review scores
Source	Rating
AllMusic	4/5 stars

In Concert, November 1975 is a live album by Richard and Linda Thompson, released on Island Records in 2007. It is a document of the pair's second tour as headliners, which took them through the United Kingdom during the autumn of 1975. Like every other album by the couple, it did not make the charts in either the UK or the United States.

== Content ==
The album is compiled from recordings made during the tour to promote the Pour Down Like Silver album. Three of the concerts on that tour were recorded by John Wood, who had worked with the Thompsons on all three of their early 1970s albums. All of the Thompson originals derive from those albums, with the exception of "Now Be Thankful," one of the final singles by Fairport Convention while Thompson was still in the band.

The covers include a medley of Morris dancing songs, one rock and roll song, and three American country music tunes. "Why Don't You Love Me" is a 1950 single by Hank Williams, also played over the closing credits to the 1971 film The Last Picture Show; "Things You Gave Me" is a track on the 1967 album Country Fever by Ricky Nelson; "It'll Be Me" is a 1957 Jerry Lee Lewis b-side, also a 1962 single by Cliff Richard; and "Together Again" is a 1964 Buck Owens b-side that managed to top the Hot Country Singles as well as its A-side, "My Heart Skips a Beat."

Recordings took place at venues in Oxford, Swindon, and Norwich. Three songs recorded on November 27 at Oxford Polytechnic had been released on the 1976 Thompson compilation (guitar, vocal); two of those, "Calvary Cross" and "It'll Be Me" are included here in different mixes. The version of "Calvary Cross" had also appeared on the 2000 compilation, The Best of Richard & Linda Thompson: The Island Records Years.

== Track listing ==
No.	Title	Writer(s)	Length
1.	"I Want to See the Bright Lights Tonight"	Richard Thompson	3:14
2.	"Hard Luck Stories"	Richard Thompson	3:51
3.	"Night Comes In"	Richard Thompson	10:48
4.	"Morris medley"	traditional	5:20
5.	"A Heart Needs a Home"	Richard Thompson	4:20
6.	"Why Don't You Love Me"	Hank Williams	2:40
7.	"Now Be Thankful"	Richard Thompson, Dave Swarbrick	2:57
8.	"Jet Plane in a Rocking Chair"	Richard Thompson	2:56
9.	"Streets of Paradise"	Richard Thompson	4:27
10.	"For Shame of Doing Wrong"	Richard Thompson	8:16
11.	"The Calvary Cross"	Richard Thompson	14:01
12.	"Hokey Pokey (The Ice Cream Song)"	Richard Thompson	3:13
13.	"Things You Gave Me"	Glen D. Hardin	2:33
14.	"It'll Be Me"	Jack Clement	4:51
15.	"Together Again"	Buck Owens	3:23

== Personnel ==
- Richard Thompson – vocals, electric guitar
- Linda Thompson – vocals
- John Kirkpatrick – accordion, concertina
- Dave Pegg – bass
- Dave Mattacks – drums

Production

- John Wood – engineer
- Dave Hutchins, Barry Sage – assistant engineers
- Robert Ellis – photography
- David Suff, Tim Chacksfield, Joe Black – project coordinators
- Philip Lloyd-Smee – packaging and design
