= Across a Crowded Room =

Studio album by Richard Thompson
- Released: April 1985
- Recorded: September and October 1984
- Studios: RAK Studios, London
- Genre: Folk rock
- Length: 37:58
- Label: Polydor
- Producer: Joe Boyd

Richard Thompson chronology
Small Town Romance (1984)	Across a Crowded Room (1985)	Daring Adventures (1986)

Across a Crowded Room is the fourth solo album by Richard Thompson released in 1985, on both vinyl and CD, on the Polydor label. As of 2026, it remains his final collaboration with producer Joe Boyd (who had produced Shoot Out the Lights), as well as his last studio album to have been fully recorded in England. The album gives its name to the film Richard Thompson: Across a Crowded Room, a concert film shot at a 1985 performance at Barrymore's in Ottawa, Ontario, Canada, which focuses on material from the album.

== Reception ==
Professional ratings
Review scores
Source	Rating
The Encyclopedia of Popular Music	3/5 stars
Rolling Stone	4/5 stars

Reviewing the album on its release, Spin wrote, "Richard's command is such that his instrument serves as an eloquent extension of his limited vocal range, punctuating and amplifying each song. He puts nimble ax-wielders like Eddie Van Halen and Adrian Belew to shame, refusing to sacrifice a single note or nuance, even at high speed. As rewarding as any you'll hear all year.

Mark Deming, writing for AllMusic, said, "Across A Crowded Room takes a slightly more subtle approach than Hand of Kindness; the arrangements have been pared back a bit (there are fewer horn charts, and John Kirkpatrick's accordion is sadly absent), and Joe Boyd's production is roomier and more atmospheric, making the most of the album's broader soundscape.... There aren't many musicians who could make an album as strong as Across A Crowded Room and have it sound like business as usual..."

Kurt Loder for Rolling Stone said, "Across a Crowded Room is the first Richard Thompson solo album in thirteen years to be released on a major label, and by any standard other than his own it's a very fine record, replete with rollicking rhythms, master-class guitar excursions and piercing lyrical apercus. However, longtime Thompson listeners may find that, compared to much of his past work — particularly the six superb studio albums he recorded with his ex-wife, singer Linda Thompson — Across a Crowded Room is faintly disappointing.

Reviewing the album 40 years after its release, The Quietus said, "... when Across A Crowded Room was released in 1985 it was met with a relatively muted response. And yet it is a work of subtle, off-kilter beauty, recalling at times the frazzled alienation of John Cale's Island Trilogy; the jangling intensity of early R.E.M.; the abstract darkness of mid-80s Scott Walker.

== Track listing ==
All songs written by Richard Thompson.

1. "When the Spell Is Broken" – 4:31
2. "You Don't Say" – 3:35
3. "I Ain't Going to Drag My Feet No More" – 4:22
4. "Love in a Faithless Country" – 5:55
5. "Fire in the Engine Room" – 3:39
6. "Walking Through a Wasted Land" – 4:01
7. "Little Blue Number" – 3:04
8. "She Twists the Knife Again" – 3:12
9. "Ghosts in the Wind" – 5:39

The listing reflects the sequence of songs the original LP release. The original CD issue included an extra track, "Shine On Love" and has a different running order. Subsequent CD re-issues have reflected the song selection and sequence shown above. In 1985 the album was re-issued on CD by PolyGram and in 1992 was re-mastered at Sound Recording Technology, Cambridge and re-issued on CD by BGO.

== Personnel ==
=== Musicians ===
- Richard Thompson – guitar, vocals
- Simon Nicol – guitar
- Dave Mattacks – drums
- Bruce Lynch – bass guitar
- Dave Bitelli – alto saxophone
- Pete Thomas – tenor saxophone
- Christine Collister, Phil Barnes, Clive Gregson and The Soultanas – backing vocals
- Alan Dunn – accordion
- Philip Pickett – shawm, crumhorn, recorder and symphony

=== Technical ===
- Joe Boyd – production
- Jack Nuber – engineering
- Greg Jackman and Jerry Boys – remix engineering
- Chris Dickie – assistant engineering
- Jack Skinner – mastering
- Dennis Keely – back cover photography
- Phil Smee and Donato Cinicolo – front cover photography
- Phil Smee at Waldo's – cover design
