= Tear-Stained Letter =

1984 single by Richard Thompson

Single by Richard Thompson

from the album Hand of Kindness
- B-side: "Where the Wind Don't Whine"
- Released: May 1984
- Genre: Folk rock, zydeco
- Length: 4:40
- Label: Hannibal
- Songwriter: Richard Thompson
- Producer: Joe Boyd

Richard Thompson singles chronology
"The Wrong Heartbeat" (1983)	"Tear-Stained Letter" (1984)	"When the Spell is Broken" (1985)

Music video
- "Tear-Stained Letter” on YouTube

"Tear-Stained Letter" is the opening track from Richard Thompson's 1983 album Hand of Kindness. The song has been recorded by others, including a notable hit version by Jo-El Sonnier in 1988.

== Content ==
With a strong zydeco feel, the song's length is 4 minutes and 40 seconds. The main riff is performed on saxophones by Pete Thomas and Pete Zorn, who also performs the background vocals, and on accordion by John Kirkpatrick. The coda features a duet between a sax solo, accordion solo, and guitar solo by Richard Thompson.

The song is in the key of G major, with a fast tempo in 4/4 time. It uses a chord pattern of E^{7}–A–E^{7}–A–D–G on the verses, and B^{7}–C–D–G twice on the chorus.

The lyrics feature a narrator who has broken up with a tumultuous romantic partner: "Just when I thought that things would get better / Right through the door come a tear-stained letter".

== Personnel ==
- Richard Thompson – guitar, vocals
- Dave Pegg – bass guitar
- Dave Mattacks – drums
- Simon Nicol – guitar
- Pete Zorn – saxophone, backing vocals
- Pete Thomas – saxophone
- Clive Gregson – backing vocals
- John Kirkpatrick – accordion

== Jo-El Sonnier version ==
"Tear-Stained Letter"

Single by Jo-El Sonnier

from the album Come On Joe
- B-side: "Say You Love Me"
- Released: July 1988
- Genre: Country
- Length: 4:17
- Label: RCA Nashville
- Songwriter: Richard Thompson
- Producers: Richard Bennett, Bill Halverson

Jo-El Sonnier singles chronology
"No More One More Time" (1988)	"Tear-Stained Letter" (1988)	"Rainin' in My Heart" (1988)

Music video
- "Tear-Stained Letter” on YouTube

Country music singer Jo-El Sonnier covered the song on his 1988 album Come On Joe. His version was released as a single in 1988, reaching number nine on the Hot Country Songs charts. Kenny Greenberg plays lead guitar on Sonnier's version. Actor Judge Reinhold appears in the music video for the song.

=== Charts ===
==== Weekly charts ====
Chart (1988)	Peak position
US Hot Country Songs (Billboard)	9
Canadian RPM Country Tracks	5

==== Year-end charts ====
Chart (1988)	Position
US Hot Country Songs (Billboard)	89

== Other versions ==
Patty Loveless covered the song on her 1996 album The Trouble with the Truth.

Southside Johnny and the Asbury Jukes covered the song on their 2005 album Into the Harbour.
