= (guitar, vocal) =

Compilation album by Richard Thompson
- Released: May 1976
- Recorded: 1967–14 April 1976
- Genre: Rock
- Length: 68:21
- Label: Island
- Producer: Richard Thompson, Richard Williams, John Wood

Richard Thompson chronology
Henry the Human Fly (1972)	(guitar, vocal) (1976)	Live! (More or Less) (1976)

Professional ratings
Review scores
Source	Rating
Allmusic	link
Robert Christgau	(B) link

(guitar, vocal) is a 1976 album by Richard Thompson. It was released by Island Records as a career retrospective after he and his wife Linda had gone into semi-retirement from the business of making and performing music following the release of Pour Down Like Silver (1975).

Most tracks are unreleased recordings from Thompson's career to date - though the two instrumental tracks were recorded specifically for this compilation. (guitar, vocal) spans Thompsons's early years with Fairport Convention as well as the time he spent performing and recording as a duo with wife Linda. The release was notable for two live cuts from the 1975 Richard and Linda Thompson tour — "Night Comes In" and "Calvary Cross" — which featured lengthy guitar solos by Thompson, and for the Fairport Convention tracks "The Ballad of Easy Rider" featuring an excellent vocal from Sandy Denny which was an unreleased track from the Liege & Lief sessions and "Poor Will and the Jolly Hangman" which had been recorded for and then omitted from that group's Full House album.

(guitar, vocal) has been out of print for some years now. Several tracks first released as part of this compilation have subsequently been included as bonus tracks on remastered Fairport Convention and Richard & Linda Thompson albums issued by Island Records. However the BBC version of Mr Lacey was unavailable elsewhere, until its release on the 19-CD boxset Sandy Denny : it did not feature on the recent Fairport Convention boxset.

== Track listing ==
All songs written by Richard Thompson except where indicated otherwise.

Side one

1. "Time Will Show the Wiser" (Emitt Rhodes) – this recording was included on Fairport Convention's first album. – 3:03
2. "Throwaway Street Puzzle" (Ashley Hutchings, Thompson) – originally released as the b-side to "Meet On The Ledge," the single from Fairport's second album What We Did On Our Holidays. This song was a bonus track on the 2003 re-issue of What We Did On Our Holidays. – 3:18
3. "Mr Lacey" (Hutchings) – this version is from a 1968 BBC radio broadcast is included on the 19-CD boxset Sandy Denny. – 2:53
4. "The Ballad of Easy Rider" (Roger McGuinn) – Recorded during the sessions in 1969 for Fairport's Liege & Lief album. The 2002 re-issue of the Unhalfbricking album included "The Ballad of Easy Rider" as a bonus track as it was felt that the song fitted better with the mix of contemporary songs on that album rather than the traditional feel of Liege & Lief. – 4:34
5. "Poor Will and the Jolly Hangman" (Thompson, Dave Swarbrick) – originally recorded during the 1970 sessions for Fairport's Full House album. Thompson was unhappy with the vocals and insisted that the track be omitted from the original album. However, the track was included on the 2001 re-issue of Full House. The recording included on (guitar, vocal) has extra vocals by Linda Thompson recorded in 1975. – 5:23

Side two

1. "Sweet Little Rock 'n Roller" (Chuck Berry) – recorded in concert at the Troubador club in Los Angeles during Fairport's 1970 tour. – 4:18
2. "A Heart Needs a Home" – this is a different recording and arrangement of the song included on the Hokey Pokey album. This track was included in the 2000 The Island Records Years compilation. – 4:04
3. "The Dark End of the Street" (Dan Penn, Chips Moman) – recorded during a concert at the Queen Elizabeth Hall, London in April 1975. The same recording was included as a bonus track on the 2004 re-issue of the Pour Down Like Silver album. – 4:22
4. "It'll Be Me" (Jack Clement) – recorded during a concert at Oxford Polytechnic in November 1975. The same recording was included as a bonus track on the 2004 re-issue of the Hokey Pokey album. – 4:22

Side three

1. "Flee As a Bird" (trad., arr. Thompson) – recorded in 1976 for this compilation. – 3:11
2. "Night Comes In" – recorded during a concert at Oxford Polytechnic in November 1975. The same recording was included as a bonus track on the 2004 re-issue of the Pour Down Like Silver album. – 12:24

Side four

1. "The Pitfall/The Excursion" – recorded in 1976 for this compilation. – 3:02
2. "Calvary Cross" – recorded during a concert at Oxford Polytechnic in November 1975. The same recording was included in the 2000 The Island Records Years compilation. – 13:27

== Personnel ==
- Richard Thompson — vocals, guitars, dulcimer, mandolin
- Sandy Denny, Judy Dyble, Iain Matthews, Linda Thompson — vocals
- Simon Nicol — guitars, mellotron
- Dave Swarbrick — violin, mandolin
- John Kirkpatrick — accordion
- Pete Ross — harmonica
- Ian Whiteman — electric piano, harmonium
- Pat Donaldson, Ashley Hutchings, Dave Pegg — bass
- Timi Donald, Martin Lamble, Dave Mattacks — drums

Production personnel

- Joe Boyd, Todd Lloyd — producer
- John Wood — producer, engineer
- Victor Gamm — engineer
