= RT- The Life and Music of Richard Thompson =

RT– The Life and Music of Richard Thompson

Box set by Richard Thompson
- Released: February 2006
- Genre: Rock
- Length: 5:33:28
- Label: Free Reed
- Producer: Neil Wayne and Nigel Schofield

Richard Thompson chronology
Grizzly Man (2005)	RT– The Life and Music of Richard Thompson (2006)	Sweet Warrior (2007)

Professional ratings
Review scores
Source	Rating
AllMusic	3.5/5 stars
Encyclopedia of Popular Music	4/5 stars

RT- The Life and Music of Richard Thompson is a 5-CD box set by Richard Thompson, released in February 2006. It gives an extensive overview of Thompson's long career without including content from any of his mainstream albums.

While many of the songs included are familiar to Thompson fans, the tracks are mostly live, nearly all of them previously unreleased, and the arrangements are often different from those of the original recordings. Thompson himself granted the compilers access to his personal archives of recordings and photos, and other collectors of Thompsonia (most notably American record producer Edward Haber) also contributed to the set. Thompson retained (and exercised) the right of veto over any aspect of the set.

Of particular interest are live tracks by Richard and Linda Thompson (including a few from the 1982 "tour from hell"), songs demo-ed for his first solo album Henry the Human Fly as well as several of Thompson's comic songs ("Madonna's Wedding" and his lampooning of Janet Jackson's infamous breast-baring moment at the Super Bowl) and several songs that Thompson himself had never released.

The set also includes a 168-page book – consisting of a biography, an exclusive interview and track notes – and a reproduction of a Vincent Motorcycles catalogue (a reference to Thompson's best loved song “1952 Vincent Black Lightning”). As with the actual track selection Thompson had input into the book, was involved in the proofreading and supplied some of the photos that are included. There are numerous typographical errors.

The five CDs are themed, which gives each disc a specific focus and helps to give this large set some cohesion.

1. Songs based on real persons and events
2. Essential songs
3. Epic live performances
4. Thompson covering other artists' songs, or playing as a session musician.
5. Rarities

A sixth CD "RT on FR" is offered free of charge by returning a coupon included in the box.

== Track listing ==
All songs written and performed by Richard Thompson except where noted otherwise

=== Disc 1: 'Walking The Long Miles Home' - Muswell Hill To LA ===
1. "Now That I Am Dead" (D. Blair and J. French)
2. "Genesis Hall"
3. "Josef Locke"
4. "Willy O'Winsbury" (traditional, arranged by Thompson)
5. "Don't Sit On My Jimmy Shands"
6. "Nobody's Wedding"
7. "Madonna's Wedding"
8. "Walking The Long Miles Home"
9. "Withered And Died"
10. "Beat The Retreat"
11. "The Great Valerio" – performed by Richard and Linda Thompson
12. "Walking On A Wire" – performed by Richard and Linda Thompson
13. "Never Again" – performed by Richard and Linda Thompson
14. "The End Of The Rainbow"
15. "King Of Bohemia"
16. "Killerman Gold Posse"
17. "Lotteryland"
18. "Now Be Thankful"
19. "Shoot Out The Lights"
20. "Outside Of The Inside"

=== Disc 2: 'Finding Better Words' - The Essential Richard Thompson ===
1. "I Feel So Good"
2. "Push And Shove"
3. "Time To Ring Some Changes" – performed by Richard and Linda Thompson
4. "Cooksferry Queen"
5. "Waltzing's For Dreamers"
6. "I Want To See The Bright Lights Tonight" performed by Richard and Linda Thompson
7. "I Misunderstood"
8. "Meet On The Ledge"
9. "Down Where The Drunkards Roll"
10. "Gethsemane"
11. "Tear-Stained Letter"
12. "Wall Of Death"
13. "1952 Vincent Black Lightning"
14. "From Galway To Graceland" – performed by Richard Thompson and Fairport Convention
15. "Crazy Man Michael"
16. "Dimming Of The Day" – performed by Richard and Linda Thompson
17. "Beeswing"

=== Disc 3: 'Shine In The Dark' - Epic Live Workouts ===
1. "Valerie"
2. "Don't Let A Thief Steal Into Your Heart"
3. "Ghosts In The Wind"
4. "Crash The Party"
5. "For Shame Of Doing Wrong" – performed by Richard and Linda Thompson
6. "Calvary Cross"
7. "Sloth" – performed by Richard and Linda Thompson
8. "Night Comes In"
9. "Drowned Dog, Black Night"
10. "Put It There Pal"
11. "Morris Medley/Flying Saucer Rock 'n roll" (traditional, arranged Thompson / R. Scott)

=== Disc 4: 'The Songs Pour Down Live Silver' - The Covers & Sessions ===
1. "Substitute" (P. Townshend)
2. "Tempted" (C. Difford and G. Tillbrook)
3. "The Story Of Hamlet" (F. Loesser) – performed by Richard Thompson and Danny Thompson
4. "Oops! I Did It Again" (K. Sandberg and R. Yacoub)
5. "Ça plane pour moi" (Plastic Bertrand)
6. "Why Don't Women Like Me?" (G. Formby)
7. "Time Has Told Me" (N. Drake) – performed by Richard Thompson and Raymond Kāne
8. "Shenandoah" (traditional, arranged Thompson)
9. "Danny Boy" (traditional, arranged Thompson)
10. "Move It" (P. Samwell) – performed by Richard Thompson with Fairport Convention
11. "Willie and the Hand Jive" / "Not Fade Away" (J. Otis / N. Petty and C. Hardin)
12. "Loch Lomond" (traditional, arranged Thompson)
13. "Job of Journeywork" (traditional, arranged Thompson)
14. "Napoleon's Dream" (traditional, arranged Thompson) – performed by Richard and Linda Thompson
15. "Sally Rackett" (traditional, arranged Thompson)
16. "God Loves A Drunk" – performed by Norma Waterson
17. "The Angels Took My Racehorse Away" – performed by Dave Burland
18. "Poseidon" (J. Owen)– performed by Judith Owen and Richard Thompson
19. "Wall Of Death / Just Like Tom Thumb's Blues / Needles and Pins" (Thompson / B. Dylan / S. Bono)
20. "You'll Never Walk Alone" (R. Rodgers and O. Hammerstein)
21. "I Ain't Marching Any More" (P. Ochs)
22. "My Generation / I Can't Explain / Substitute" (P. Townshend)

=== Disc 5: 'Something Here Worth More Than Gold' - Real Rarities ===
1. "Albion Sunrise" – performed by the Albion Country Band
2. "How Many Times Do You Have To Fall" – performed by Richard and Linda Thompson
3. "Bad News Is All The Wind Can Carry"
4. "Mrs Rita"
5. "Shady Lies" – performed by the Albion Country Band
6. "Lucky in Life, Unlucky in Love"
7. "Dragging the River"
8. "Alexander Graham Bell"
9. "Someone Else's Fancy"
10. "Modern Woman" – performed by Richard and Linda Thompson
11. "Woman Or A Man" – performed by Richard and Linda Thompson
12. "My Daddy Is A Mummy"
13. "You Got What You Wanted"
14. "In Over Your Head"
15. "Dear Janet Jackson"

=== Disc 6: RT on FR ===
1. Meet On The Ledge.
2. When I Get To The Border.
3. I Want To See The Bright Lights.
4. We Sing Hallelujah.
5. The Hangman's Reel.
6. Albion Sunrise.
7. Sir Patrick Spens.
8. New St. George.
9. Sword Dance/Young Black Cow.
10. The Lady Is A Tramp.
11. Farewell, Farewell.
12. Meet On The Ledge.
13. Gas Almost Works
14. Withered And Died.
15. Has He Got A Friend For Me.
16. End Of The Rainbow.
17. Beeswing.
