= Hand of Kindness =

Studio album by Richard Thompson
- Released: June 1983
- Recorded: 1983
- Studio: Olympic, London; Ocean Way, Hollywood
- Genre: Rock, folk rock, zydeco
- Length: 41:15
- Label: Hannibal
- Producer: Joe Boyd

Richard Thompson chronology
| Strict Tempo! (1981) | Hand of Kindness (1983) | Small Town Romance (1984) |

Professional ratings
Review scores
| Source | Rating |
|---|---|
| AllMusic | 4.5/5 stars |
| The Encyclopedia of Popular Music | 4/5 stars |
| Rolling Stone | 4/5 stars |

Hand of Kindness is the third solo album by singer/songwriter/guitarist Richard Thompson. It was recorded and released in 1983, after a ten year collaboration with former wife Linda Thompson. It is his first album of original solo material since Henry the Human Fly (1972).

== Background and details ==
After having separated from Linda, and the "Tour From Hell" to promote the couple's Shoot Out the Lights, Richard resumed his own career as a recording and performing artist.

Several songs feature the twin saxophones of Pete Zorn and Pete Thomas, and for about 18 months after the release of Hand of Kindness, Thompson toured with his "Big Band" that featured the two sax players prominently.

The album opens with "Tear-Stained Letter", later a country music top ten hit for Jo-El Sonnier. In 2021, Thompson's ex-wife Linda cited album track "How I Wanted To" as her favorite of her former husband's songs.

The album's cover photo features Thompson holding an acoustic guitar made for him by American luthier Danny Ferrington; the same guitar appears on the cover of Thompson's next release, Small Town Romance.

The backing band for the album featured Thompson's former Fairport Convention colleagues Simon Nicol (rhythm guitar), Dave Pegg (bass), and Dave Mattacks (drums). The album featured every musician from Fairport's Full House album except for violinist Dave Swarbrick.

== Track listing ==
All tracks are written by Richard Thompson.

Side one
| No. | Title | Length |
|---|---|---|
| 1. | "Tear-Stained Letter" | 4:42 |
| 2. | "How I Wanted To" | 5:12 |
| 3. | "Both Ends Burning" | 3:51 |
| 4. | "A Poisoned Heart and a Twisted Memory" | 5:25 |

Side two
| No. | Title | Length |
|---|---|---|
| 1. | "The Wrong Heartbeat" | 3:15 |
| 2. | "Hand of Kindness" | 6:03 |
| 3. | "Devonside" | 4:46 |
| 4. | "Two Left Feet" | 3:53 |

CD-only bonus track
| No. | Title | Length |
|---|---|---|
| 5. | "Where the Wind Don't Whine" | 4:09 |

== Personnel ==
- Richard Thompson - guitar, vocals
- Dave Pegg - bass guitar
- Dave Mattacks - drums
- Simon Nicol - guitar
- Pete Zorn - saxophone, backing vocals
- Pete Thomas - saxophone
- John Hiatt, Bobby King and Clive Gregson - backing vocals
- John Kirkpatrick - accordion, concertina
- Aly Bain - violin

== Charts ==
Chart performance for Hand of Kindness
| Chart (1983) | Peak position |
|---|---|
| US Billboard 200 | 186 |
