= Live at the BBC (Richard & Linda Thompson album) =

Richard Thompson – Live at the BBC

Live album by Richard Thompson
- Released: 2011
- Recorded: 1973–2009
- Label: Universal

Richard Thompson chronology
Dream Attic (2010)	Richard Thompson – Live at the BBC (2011)	Cabaret Of Souls (2012)

Richard Thompson – Live at the BBC is a compilation of audio and video recordings made by Richard Thompson for the BBC. The set consists of three CDs and a DVD. The material was recorded over a number of years; the earliest tracks date back to 1973, the most recent to 2009. Most of the material was recorded for various TV and radio shows broadcast by the BBC. About 40% of the included material was performed by Richard and Linda Thompson together.

== Track listing ==
=== CD Disc 1 ===
All songs written by Richard Thompson except where noted

1. "The Little Beggar Girl"
2. "Dragging the River"
3. "The Great Valerio"
4. "The Neasden Hornpipe"
5. "I Want To See The Bright Lights Tonight"
6. "Hokey Pokey (The Ice Cream Song)"
7. "Georgie On A Spree"
8. "I'll Regret It All In The Morning"
9. "A Heart Needs A Home"
10. "Wishing" (Holly, Montgomery)
11. "I'm Turning Off A Memory" (Haggard)
12. "A Man In Need"
13. "Withered And Died"
14. "New-Fangled Flogging Reel/Kerry Reel" (Trad. Arr Thompson)
15. "Shoot Out The Lights"
16. "Just The Motion"
17. "Back Street Slide"
18. "Night Comes In"
19. "Dimming Of The Day"
20. "Modern Woman "
- Tracks 1 to 4 were recorded in January 1973 for John Peel's radio show.
- Track 5 was recorded in January 1974.
- Tracks 6 to 11 were recorded in February 1975 for John Peel radio show.
- Tracks 12 to 18 were recorded in concert at the Paris Theatre in May 1982.
- Tracks 19 and 20 were recorded for the BBC Radio show Folk on 2 in 1982.

=== CD Disc 2 ===
All songs written by Richard Thompson

1. "She Twists The Knife Again"
2. "You Don't Say"
3. "When The Spell Is Broken"
4. "The Angels Took My Racehorse Away"
5. "Valerie"
6. "Jennie"
7. "You Don't Say"
8. "Fire In The Engine Room"
9. "Wall Of Death"
10. "Nearly In Love"
11. "Valerie"
12. "When The Spell Is Broken"
13. "Two Left Feet"
14. "Turning Of The Tide"
15. "How Will I Ever Be Simple Again"
16. "Ghosts In The Wind"
17. "Shoot Out The Lights"
18. "She Twists The Knife Again"
19. "Withered And Died"
20. "The End of the Rainbow "
- Tracks 1 to 3 were recorded in July 1985 for Andy Kershaw
- Tracks 4 to 10 were recorded in concert at the Hammersmith Palais in November 1986
- Tracks 11 to 20 were recorded in January 1987 for Andy Kershaw

The second half of disc two had a recording problem and plays back at 3–4% faster than intended. The problem wasn't detected during the transfer and mastering portion of the release.

=== CD Disc 3 ===
All songs written by Richard Thompson except where noted

1. "Gethsemane"
2. "Outside of the Inside"
3. "Wall Of Death"
4. "Word Unspoken, Sight Unseen"
5. "Kidzz"
6. "Did She Jump Or Was She Pushed" (Richard Thompson and Linda Thompson)
7. "The End of the Rainbow"
8. "One Door Opens"
9. "Outside Of The Inside"
10. "Let It Blow"
11. "Old Thames Side"
12. "Dad's Gonna Kill Me"
13. "Down Where The Drunkards Roll"
14. "I Want To See The Bright Lights Tonight"
15. "Needle and Thread"
16. "So Ben Mi Ca Bon Tempo" (Orazio Vecchi)
17. "The Cutty Wren" (Trad. Arr Thompson)
18. "See My Friends" (Ray Davies)
19. "Time’s Gonna Break You"
20. "William Brown" (Trad. Arr Thompson)
21. "Meet On The Ledge"
- Tracks 1 to 3 were recorded in September 2001 for Andy Kershaw
- Tracks 4 to 7 were recorded in April 2003 for Andy Kershaw
- Tracks 8 and 9 were recorded in May 2004
- Tracks 10 to 15 were recorded in July 2007 for Tom Robinson's show on BBC 6 Music
- Tracks 16 to 18 were recorded in December 2008 for Bob Harris
- Tracks 19 to 21 were recorded in January 2009

=== DVD ===
All compositions by Richard Thompson except where noted

1. "Jet Plane In A Rocking Chair"
2. "A Heart Needs A Home"
3. "Night Comes In"
4. "I'm A Dreamer" (Sandy Denny)
5. "I Want To See The Bright Lights Tonight"
6. "Shoot Out The Lights"
7. "You're Going to Need Somebody"
8. "Dargai" (James Scott Skinner)
9. "Dimming Of The Day"
10. "Pavanne" (Richard Thompson and Linda Thompson)
11. "Just The Motion"
12. "Fire In The Engine Room"
13. "She Twists The Knife Again"
14. "Wall Of Death"
15. "When The Spell Is Broken"
16. "Did She Jump Or Was She Pushed"
17. "The Wrong Heartbeat"
18. "Tear Stained Letter"
19. "She Twists the Knife Again "
- Tracks 1 and 2 were recorded in March 1975 for The Old Grey Whistle Test
- Tracks 3 to 9 were recorded in August 1981 for the show A Little Night Music
- Tracks 10 and 11 were recorded in January 1981 for Jake Thackray and Songs
- Tracks 12 to 18 were recorded in April 1985 for Polydor and broadcast on BBC Television in August 1985
- Track 19 was recorded in August 1985 for The Old Grey Whistle Test

== Personnel ==
- Richard Thompson – guitar and vocals
- Linda Thompson – vocals
- Simon Nicol – guitar and backing vocals
- Timmy Donald – drums
- Pat Donaldson – bass guitar
- Ian Whiteman – piano
- John Kirkpatrick – accordion, concertina
- Pete Zorn – bass guitar and backing vocals
- Dave Mattacks – drums
- Clive Gregson – guitar and backing vocals
- Christine Collister – backing vocals, percussion and acoustic guitar
- Gerry Conway – drums
- Rory MacFarlane – bass guitar and backing vocals
