= Small Town Romance =

Live album by Richard Thompson
- Released: September 1984
- Recorded: January 1982 at The Bottom Line, New York City and September 1982 at Gerde's Folk City, New York City
- Genre: Folk
- Length: 63:04
- Label: Hannibal
- Producer: Joe Boyd and Ilana Pelzig Cellum

Richard Thompson chronology
Hand of Kindness (1983)	Small Town Romance (1984)	Across a Crowded Room (1985)

Professional ratings
Review scores
Source	Rating
Allmusic	4/5 stars
Encyclopedia of Popular Music	4/5 stars
Uncut	3/5 stars

Small Town Romance is the first live album by British singer/songwriter Richard Thompson.

Before and after the "Tour From Hell" to promote the Richard and Linda Thompson album Shoot Out the Lights, Richard played solo shows in the US in 1982. Three of these shows were recorded for radio broadcasts. When Thompson left the ailing Hannibal Records label in 1984, the release of an album collated from the 1982 live recordings was negotiated as part of the amicable separation.

Thompson was unhappy with the quality of the recordings and the performances and later persuaded Hannibal to delete Small Town Romance from their catalog. But the demand continued, and in the face of bootleg versions and high prices being paid for second-hand copies, the album was re-released, with Thompson's consent, in 1997.

The album might be described as "warts and all". Thompson's vocals are sometimes shaky, especially on songs formerly sung by Linda Thompson, but for many years this was the only legitimate record available of Richard Thompson playing a solo, acoustic show – a live presentation which he has increasingly featured and which now makes up the majority of his live performances.

The album's cover photo features Thompson peering out a hotel window, whilst holding an acoustic guitar made for him by American luthier Danny Ferrington. This guitar appears in the cover photo of Thompson's previous release Hand of Kindness.

== Track listing ==
All songs written by Richard Thompson; except "Honky Tonk Blues'" by Hank Williams

1. "Time to Ring Some Changes"
2. "Beat the Retreat"
3. "Woman or a Man?"
4. "A Heart Needs a Home"
5. "For Shame of Doing Wrong"
6. "Genesis Hall"
7. "Honky Tonk Blues"
8. "Small Town Romance"
9. "I Want to See the Bright Lights Tonight"
10. "Down Where the Drunkards Roll"
11. "Love Is Bad for Business"
12. "The Great Valerio"
13. "Don't Let a Thief Steal into Your Heart"
14. "Never Again"

The 1986 Compact Disc release of the album, later deleted but subsequently reissued in 1997, included three extra tracks

- "How Many Times"
- "Roll Over Vaughan Williams"
- "Meet on the Ledge"

== Personnel ==
- Richard Thompson – guitar, vocals
