= Sunnyvista =

Studio album by Richard and Linda Thompson
- Released: October 1979
- Recorded: 1979
- Studio: Olympic, London
- Genre: Folk rock
- Length: 48:56
- Label: Chrysalis
- Producer: Richard Thompson, John Wood

Richard and Linda Thompson chronology
| First Light (1978) | Sunnyvista (1979) | Shoot Out the Lights (1982) |

Official audio
- "Sunnyvista" on YouTube

You're Going To Need Somebody - sample
An audio sample of "You're Going To Need Somebody"

Sunnyvista is the fifth album by Richard and Linda Thompson, released in 1979, by Chrysalis Records.

After the artistic mismatch of the previous year's comeback album, First Light, the Thompsons made greater use on this album of backing musicians with whom they had formerly worked.

== Style ==
Sunnyvista covers wide ground stylistically and includes some of Richard Thompson's most overtly rocking songs – possibly reflecting pressure from the record label to deliver a commercially successful album.

There are more secular songs on this album than on its immediate predecessor. "You're Going to Need Somebody" and "Why Do You Turn Your Back?" are the most explicitly religious tracks. The former is a joyous affirmation of divine mercy and is notable for John Kirkpatrick's accordion playing. The latter has an unusual and long verse structure which allows for an effective build and release of tension.

"Saturday Rolling Around" is a homage to cajun music, a genre that Richard Thompson had long admired and which he had previously experimented with on Fairport Convention's Unhalfbricking (1969) album. This too is a joyous and upbeat song. Elsewhere the mood is more spiteful, especially in the opening "Civilisation" with its sarcastic lyrics and in the heavy-handed satire of the title track that takes a tilt at a community which is superficially happy, but also controlled and uniform. Whether this is a reference to late 70s Britain, or to the commune that the Thompsons had recently left, is not clear. The song is principally a tango, with slower lyrical interludes.

Thompson tries his hand at funk on "Justice In the Streets" and at hard rock on "Living on Borrowed Time". "Traces of My Love" is a tender song of longing and lyrically is in the ancient sufic tradition of expressing love for the divine in secular terms. "Sisters" is a mournful yet soulful ballad, with harmony backing by the McGarrigles. Linda Thompson, in the liner notes for her 1996 compilation Dreams Fly Away, has revealed that it was not written about sisters, but about two real women she knew who were "wives" in a Muslim polygamous relationship and were estranged: "You have to be a very big person to make that work. This guy was a creep". The two actual women were subsequently reconciled.

"Lonely Hearts" has backing vocals from Gerry Rafferty. A digitally re-mixed version of the song appears on Dreams Fly Away.

"Georgie on a Spree", included on some CD reissues of the album as a bonus track, is a remake of a song originally featured on the 1975 Hokey Pokey album. It had been chosen as the theme tune for the BBC television drama Kiss the Girls and Make Them Cry and the new version was issued as a single.

== Cover ==
The front and back cover of the album feature a number of photographs of the Alexandra Road Estate in Camden, London. The front cover features a visual pun on the company logo used at the time by UK travel agent Thomson Holidays.

== Critical response ==
Professional ratings
Review scores
| Source | Rating |
|---|---|
| AllMusic | 3.5/5 stars |
| The Encyclopedia of Popular Music | 2/5 stars |
| Music Week | 2/4 stars |
| The Rolling Stone Album Guide | 3/5 stars |

The response to Sunnyvista by the critics and the public was indifferent, and Chrysalis decided to not extend their relationship with the Thompsons. The settlement between artist and label left Thompson owning the master tapes for the two albums he had recorded for Chrysalis. The albums were later licensed to Joe Boyd's Hannibal label for re-issue on CD in 1991.

== Track listing ==
All songs written by Richard Thompson.

Side one
| No. | Title | Length |
|---|---|---|
| 1. | "Civilisation" | 4:45 |
| 2. | "Borrowed Time" | 5:34 |
| 3. | "Saturday Rolling Around" | 3:20 |
| 4. | "You're Going to Need Somebody" | 3:56 |
| 5. | "Why Do You Turn Your Back?" | 5:08 |

Side two
| No. | Title | Length |
|---|---|---|
| 6. | "Sunnyvista" | 4:30 |
| 7. | "Lonely Hearts" | 5:00 |
| 8. | "Sisters" | 4:47 |
| 9. | "Justice in the Streets" | 4:00 |
| 10. | "Traces of My Love" | 4:00 |

== Personnel ==
- Richard Thompson – guitar, vocals, mandolin, hammered dulcimer Roland guitar, synthesizer
- Linda Thompson – vocals
- Michael Spencer-Arscott – drums (later with Gregory Hoskins and the Stickpeople)
- Dave Pegg – bass guitar
- Timi Donald – drums, percussion (formerly with Blue)
- Pat Donaldson – bass guitar on "Traces of My Love"
- Pete Wingfield – keyboards
- Rabbit Bundrick – keyboards on "Why Do You Turn Your Back?" and "Traces of My Love"
- John Kirkpatrick – accordion, triangle
- Bruce Lynch – bass guitar on "Justice in the Streets"
- Dave Mattacks – drums on "Justice in the Streets"
- Luís Jardim – percussion
- Sue Harris – oboe, hammered dulcimer
- Kate & Anna McGarrigle, Glenn Tilbrook, Julian Littman, Marc Ellington, Olive Simpson, Nicole Tibbels, Lindsay Benton, David Beavan, Gerry Rafferty, Hafsa Abdul Jabbas, Abdu Rahim – backing vocals

Technical

- Andy Lunn – assistant engineer
- Peter Wagg – art direction
- Gered Mankowitz – photography
