= Amnesia (Richard Thompson album) =

Studio album by Richard Thompson
- Released: October 1988
- Recorded: 1988
- Studio: Sunset Sound, Los Angeles and Konk Studios, London
- Genre: Folk rock
- Length: 43:27
- Label: Capitol
- Producer: Mitchell Froom

Richard Thompson chronology
Daring Adventures (1986)	Amnesia (1988)	Sweet Talker (1991)

Amnesia is the sixth studio album by Richard Thompson, recorded and released in 1988.

After the lackluster sales of Across a Crowded Room (1985) and Daring Adventures (1986), Polydor declined their option to renew their contract with Thompson. Thompson's then manager Gary Stamler negotiated a deal with Capitol Records and Thompson cut his first album for his new label in 1988.

This was a good time for Thompson to be at Capitol: at the time the label was managed by Hale Milgrim, who was already a fan of Thompson and his work. Thus Capitol invested more money and effort into promoting Thompson than had been the case in the past and with other labels.

Mitchell Froom was retained as producer, and the album was again recorded in Los Angeles with American session musicians providing most of the backing. Thompson still used British players to lend specifically British touches to some songs. In particular long-time collaborators John Kirkpatrick, Aly Bain and Philip Pickett are used, and members of the Fairey Engineering Band provide a brass backing to "I Still Dream" that owes more to The Salvation Army than it does to Memphis or any other American centre of music.

== Reception ==
Professional ratings
Review scores
Source	Rating
Encyclopedia of Popular Music	3/5 stars
Rolling Stone	4/5 stars

The album was well received by the music press, and sales, whilst not stellar, were boosted by Capitol's commitment to promoting artist and album.

== Track listing ==
All songs written by Richard Thompson.

1. "Turning of the Tide" – 2:55
2. "Gypsy Love Songs" – 6:14
3. "Reckless Kind" – 4:23
4. "Jerusalem on the Jukebox" – 4:08
5. "I Still Dream" – 5:09
6. "Don't Tempt Me" – 3:35
7. "Yankee, Go Home" – 3:05
8. "Can't Win" – 5:28
9. "Waltzing's for Dreamers" – 4:06
10. "Pharaoh" – 4:24

== Personnel ==
=== Musicians ===
- Richard Thompson – guitar, vocals, mandolin, hammer dulcimer
- Mitchell Froom – portative organ, regal, Chamberlin, stereophonic Optigan, electric harp, organ
- Jerry Scheff – bass guitar (1, 2, 4, 5, 7, 10)
- Tony Levin – bass guitar, stick (3, 6, 8)
- Mickey Curry – drums (2, 3, 6, 7, 8)
- Jim Keltner – drums (1, 4, 5, 10)
- Alex Acuña – percussion
- Christine Collister – backing vocals
- Clive Gregson – backing vocals
- John Kirkpatrick – accordion, Anglo-concertina, bass vocals
- Philip Pickett – shawm, recorder, curtal, Peking that, bass racket
- Aly Bain – fiddle (9)
- Brian Taylor – cornet on (5) (Fairey Band)
- Tony Goddard – cornet (5) (Fairey Band)
- David Horn – tenor horn (5) (Fairey Band)
- Ian Peters – euphonium on 5 (Fairey Band)
- Fred Tackett – acoustic guitar (8)
- Frances Kelly – baroque harp
- Danny Thompson – double bass (9)
- Alistair Anderson – Northumbrian pipes

=== Technical ===
Mitchell Froom – producer

- Tchad Blake – recordist
- Mike Kloster – second engineer
- Ted Patterson – second engineer
- Bob Ludwig – mastering
- Hugh Brown – cover art and photography
