= First Light (Richard and Linda Thompson album) =

Studio album by Richard and Linda Thompson
- Released: 6 October 1978
- Recorded: 1978
- Studios: Olympic, London
- Genre: Folk rock
- Length: 43:13
- Label: Chrysalis
- Producers: Richard Thompson, John Wood

Richard and Linda Thompson chronology
| Pour Down Like Silver (1975) | First Light (1978) | Sunnyvista (1979) |

First Light is the fourth album by folk rock duo Richard and Linda Thompson. It was released on 6 October 1978 by Chrysalis Records.

== Writing and recording ==
After the release of their third album, Pour Down Like Silver, in November 1975, the Thompsons took an extended break from music. They spent much of the next three years living in sufi communes in London and Norfolk.

This prolonged sabbatical was punctuated by occasional session work by Richard Thompson and a short tour in 1977 in which the duo performed mostly new, overtly religious material and were backed by musicians who were also practitioners of the Sufi faith.

In 1978 Richard Thompson accepted an invitation from Joe Boyd to play on Julie Covington's eponymous solo debut album. The musicians hired for this album included highly regarded American session players Neil Larsen, Willie Weeks and Andy Newmark, who had also been working in the studio with George Harrison. According to Boyd the three Americans were hugely impressed by Thompson's playing and expressed a wish to work with him. Boyd also knew that Thompson had some new material and talked Thompson's manager Jo Lustig into taking advantage of the situation: "The material is there and these guys love Richard, they’re gonna kill to play with him. It would be great."

The resulting First Light was the fourth album by Richard and Linda Thompson and marked the resumption of their recording career. It is dominated by spiritual songs, some of them direct translations of sufi and Quranic texts. It was released on 6 October 1978 by Chrysalis Records.

In later years Thompson expressed dissatisfaction with his recorded output in the late 1970s: "The regrets I would have would be career stuff, I was too flaccid in the 1970s, I just wasn't thinking tightly enough to make a difference. Especially the later 70s, where I made really indifferent records, I just didn't have my mind on the job."

== Critical reception ==
Professional ratings
Review scores
| Source | Rating |
|---|---|
| AllMusic | 3/5 stars |
| Christgau's Record Guide | B |
| The Encyclopedia of Popular Music | 3/5 stars |
| The Rolling Stone Album Guide | 3.5/5 stars |

The Globe and Mail wrote that Linda's voice "is folk-clear and strong, handling love ballads such as 'Restless Highway' with complete authority... The material itself is unstintingly rich and original, with the sparkling addition of vaguely Middle-Eastern effects through the dulcimer".

Reviewing the album for AllMusic, Mark Deming said: "the Thompsons' usual band of British folk all-stars was augmented by Willie Weeks on bass and Andy Newmark on drums, a pair of first-call Los Angeles session heavyweights, and though they play with their usual effortless skill, their attempt to inject a country-rock undertow into Richard Thompson's very British melodies ends up pushing many of the performances into a strange middle ground that isn't especially interesting. ... Only on the penultimate track, 'House of Cards', does this album really come alive; First Light is a long way from bad, but it's easily the least essential release in Richard & Linda Thompson's catalog."

== Track listing ==
All songs written by Richard Thompson; except "Pavanne" by Richard and Linda Thompson, and "The Choice Wife" traditional, arranged by Richard Thompson.

Side one

1. "Restless Highway" – 3:52
2. "Sweet Surrender" – 4:40
3. "Don't Let a Thief Steal into Your Heart" – 4:38
4. "The Choice Wife" – 2:30
5. "Died for Love" – 6:30

Side two

1. "Strange Affair" – 3:05
2. "Layla" – 4:17
3. "Pavanne" – 5:00
4. "House of Cards" – 3:24
5. "First Light" – 4:17

== Personnel ==
- Richard Thompson – guitar, vocals, mandolin, dulcimer, whistle, guitar synthesizer
- Linda Thompson – vocals
- Andy Newmark – drums
- Willie Weeks – bass guitar
- Neil Larsen – keyboards
- John Kirkpatrick – accordion
- Chris Karan – percussion
- Dave Mattacks – percussion
- Dolores Keane – whistle
- Dave Brady, Heather Brady, Dave Burland, Bill Caddick, Philippa Clare, Julie Covington, Andy Fairweather Low, Trevor Lucas, Iain Matthews, Maddy Prior and Peta Webb – backing vocals
