= Dream Attic =

Live album by Richard Thompson
- Released: 30 August 2010 (UK); 31 August 2010 (USA)
- Recorded: Live at various venues, February 2010
- Genre: Rock, Folk rock
- Length: 73:18
- Label: Proper (UK, Europe); Shout! Factory (North America)
- Producer: Richard Thompson, Simon Tassano

Richard Thompson chronology
| Live Warrior (2009) | Dream Attic (2010) | Live at the BBC (2011) |

Professional ratings
Aggregate scores
| Source | Rating |
|---|---|
| Metacritic | 77/100 |
Review scores
| Source | Rating |
| SPIN | 8/10 stars |
| Encyclopedia of Popular Music | 4/5 stars |

Dream Attic is a live album by British folk rock musician Richard Thompson released in 2010, on Proper Records. While not a studio album, it is Thompson's fourteenth overall full-length album of new original solo material.

== Overview ==
Instead of recording new songs in a studio, Thompson made demo recordings, rehearsed the songs with his band and then recorded the new material live on a two-week tour of the Western United States in February 2010. Each night's first set presented thirteen new songs, played live, in the sequence they would soon have on the album.

The album was assembled from these live recordings. No studio overdubs were done. Each track on the finished album is an entire, unedited live performance of the song.

Dream Attic was nominated for the Best Contemporary Folk Album award in the 53rd Annual Grammy Awards. On its release, the album entered the British top 20 for album sales, Thompson's first. In the US the album reached No. 83 on the Billboard 200 chart.

All but two of the tracks were also performed as the first half of a January 2011 Glasgow show that was recorded for the 2011 DVD Live at Celtic Connections.

== Track listing ==
All songs written by Richard Thompson:

1. "The Money Shuffle" – 5:57
2. "Among The Gorse, Among The Grey " – 3:57
3. "Haul Me Up" – 4:51
4. "Burning Man" – 5:39
5. "Here Comes Geordie" – 3:28
6. "Demons In Her Dancing Shoes / Rondeau" (featuring Jean Joseph Mouret) – 5:38
7. "Crimescene" – 6:58
8. "Big Sun Falling In The River" – 5:27
9. "Stumble On" – 6:04
10. "Sidney Wells" – 7:34
11. "A Brother Slips Away" – 4:41
12. "Bad Again" – 5:25
13. "If Love Whispers Your Name" – 7:36

Proper Records released a "deluxe" edition of this album, with Thompson's acoustic demo recordings of the same 13 tracks on a second disc.

== Personnel ==
=== Musicians ===
- Richard Thompson – vocals, electric guitar
- Pete Zorn – acoustic guitar, flute, saxophone, mandolin, vocals
- Michael Jerome – drums, vocals
- Taras Prodaniuk – bass guitar, vocals
- Joel Zifkin – electric violin, mandolin, vocals

=== Technical ===
- Simon Tassano – mixing (at Rumiville Studio, Austin, Texas), FOH engineer and tour manager
- Jim Wilson – mastering (at Airshow Mastering, Boulder, Colorado)
- Tony Brooke – live recording
- Russ Cole – monitor engineer and production manager
- Bobby Eichorn – guitar technician and stage manager
