= Live Warrior =

Live album by Richard Thompson
- Released: April 2009
- Recorded: 2007 in the UK and United States
- Genre: Rock
- Length: 73:51
- Label: Beeswing
- Producer: Simon Tassano

Richard Thompson chronology
Sweet Warrior (2007)	Live Warrior (2009)	Dream Attic (2010)

Live Warrior is a live album by Richard Thompson recorded during the 2007 tours of the UK and United States to support the Sweet Warrior studio album. The cover also credits the members of the Richard Thompson Band: Michael Jerome, Danny Thompson, Taras Prodaniuk and Pete Zorn. It is released on Thompson's boutique Beeswing label.

The album's track selection emphasises material from Sweet Warrior, released two years before, with Live Warrior featuring eight of the fourteen tracks from that album.

== Track listing ==
All songs composed by Richard Thompson except Mingulay Boat Song, traditional with additional lyrics by Hugh Robertson.

1. "Needle and Thread"
2. "Bad Monkey"
3. "Take Care The Road You Choose"
4. "Dad's Gonna Kill Me"
5. "I Still Dream"
6. "The Wrong Heartbeat"
7. "I'll Never Give It Up"
8. "Mingulay Boat Song"
9. "Guns Are The Tongues"
10. "A Man In Need"
11. "A Bone Through Her Nose"
12. "Read About Love"
13. "Sunset Song"
14. "Mr. Stupid"

== Personnel ==
=== Musicians ===
- Richard Thompson – guitar and vocals
- Michael Jerome – drums, percussion and backing vocals
- Danny Thompson – double bass (tracks 2, 3, 7, 8, 9, 10, 11, 12, 13)
- Taras Prodaniuk – bass guitar (tracks 1, 4, 5, 6, 14)
- Pete Zorn – backing vocals, acoustic guitar, mandolin, saxophones and bass flute

=== Other ===
- Simon Tassano – FOH sound, Tour manager
- Tom Dubé – monitors, Production manager
- Bobby Eichorn – Guitar technician, Stage manager
- Edmond Deraedt – Lighting designer – US
- Paul Kell – Lighting designer – UK
