= No More One More Time =

Single by Jo-El Sonnier

from the album Come On Joe
- Released: February 1988
- Genre: Country
- Length: 3:48
- Label: RCA Nashville
- Songwriter(s): Troy Seals, Dave Kirby
- Producer(s): Richard Bennett, Bill Halverson

Jo-El Sonnier singles chronology
"Come On Joe" (1987)	"No More One More Time" (1988)	"Tear-Stained Letter" (1988)

"No More One More Time" is a song written by Troy Seals and Dave Kirby, and recorded by the American country music artist Jo-El Sonnier. It was released in February 1988 as the second single from the album Come On Joe. The song reached number 7 on the Billboard Hot Country Singles & Tracks chart.

== Charts ==
=== Weekly charts ===
Chart (1988)	Peak position
US Hot Country Songs (Billboard)	7
Canadian RPM Country Tracks	2

=== Year-end charts ===
Chart (1988)	Position
US Hot Country Songs (Billboard)	75
