= Come On Joe =

Studio album by Jo-El Sonnier
- Released: November 19, 1987
- Recorded: 1987
- Genre: Country
- Label: RCA
- Producer: Richard Bennett, Bill Halverson

Jo-El Sonnier chronology
| Cajun Life (1980) | Come On Joe (1987) | Right Next Door to Texas (1989) |

Come On Joe is a 1987 album by American country music singer Jo-El Sonnier. It was released in 1987 via RCA Records.

== Content ==
Four singles from Come On Joe charted on Billboard Hot Country Songs between 1987 and 1989: the title track, "No More One More Time", "Tear-Stained Letter", and "Rainin' in My Heart".

== Critical reception ==
Rating it 4.5 out of 5 stars, Brian Mansfield of AllMusic wrote, " Cajun-tinged contemporary country with a rock edge and intelligent songs, it is the best of Sonnier's Nashville work."

== Track listing ==
| No. | Title | Writer(s) | Length |
|---|---|---|---|
| 1. | "Baby Hold On" | Dan Kessel, David Kessel | 3:36 |
| 2. | "Paid the Price" | Moon Martin | 3:07 |
| 3. | "So Long, Baby, Goodbye" | Dave Alvin | 2:39 |
| 4. | "No More One More Time" | Dave Kirby, Troy Seals | 3:49 |
| 5. | "Come On Joe" | Tony Romeo | 4:48 |
| 6. | "Say You Love Me" | Jo-El Sonnier, Earl Bell | 3:24 |
| 7. | "Rainin' in My Heart" | Slim Harpo, Jerry West | 3:41 |
| 8. | "Louisiana 1927" | Randy Newman | 4:43 |
| 9. | "Tear-Stained Letter" | Richard Thompson | 4:15 |
| 10. | "I've Slipped Her Mind" | Dennis Walker | 6:21 |

== Personnel ==
From Come On Joe liner notes.

Musicians

- Richard Bennett – acoustic guitar, electric guitar, six-string bass guitar
- Ashley Cleveland – background vocals
- Gary Gazaway – trumpet, trombone, flugelhorn
- Kenny Greenberg – electric guitar
- John Barlow Jarvis – piano
- Michael Joyce – background vocals, bass guitar
- Mike Lawler – keyboards
- Doug Moffet – tenor saxophone, baritone saxophone
- Marianne Osiel – background vocals
- Ward Smith – alto saxophone, tenor saxophone
- Jo-El Sonnier – vocals, Cajun accordion, harmonica
- Val and Birdie – background vocals
- Tommy Wells – drums, percussion
- Steve Winwood – organ

Production

- Richard Bennett – producer
- Tim Farmer – recording
- Bill Halverson – producer, recording
- Mary Hamilton – art direction
- Ted Jensen – mastering
- The World Winds – horn arrangement

== Chart performance ==
Weekly chart performance for Come On Joe
| Chart (1987) | Peak position |
|---|---|
| US Top Country Albums (Billboard) | 17 |
