= Sweet Warrior =

Studio album by Richard Thompson
- Released: 28 May 2007
- Recorded: October and December 2006
- Studios: House of Blues Studio, Encino, Los Angeles, California
- Genres: Folk rock, contemporary folk
- Length: 68:03
- Labels: Proper (UK, Europe); The Planet Company (Australia); Shout! Factory (North America); P-Vine (Japan)
- Producers: Richard Thompson, Simon Tassano

Richard Thompson chronology
RT- The Life and Music of Richard Thompson' (2006)	Sweet Warrior (2007)	Live Warrior (2009)

Professional ratings
Aggregate scores
Source	Rating
Metacritic	84/100
Review scores
Source	Rating
AllMusic	4/5 stars
Encyclopedia of Popular Music	4/5 stars
Entertainment Weekly	A−
The A.V. Club	B
The Guardian	5/5 stars
The Independent	4/5 stars
PopMatters	8/10
Slant Magazine	4.5/5 stars
Spin	4/5 stars
Uncut	4/5 stars

Sweet Warrior is the thirteenth studio album by Richard Thompson, released in 2007. Thompson financed the recording of this album himself and then licensed the finished album to various labels for distribution. On its release, Sweet Warrior entered Amazon.com's top 20 for music sales.

== Overview ==
The album's sleeve notes are prefaced by Sonnet LVII by Edmund Spenser, "Sweet warrior! when shall I have peace with you", one of his 1595 Amoretti sonnet cycle.

The track "Dad's Gonna Kill Me" was given an advance release via Thompson's own web site and iTunes. The song was singled out for praise by critics and featured prominently in Thompson's live performances in early 2007. This song's lyrics make extensive use of US military slang (the "Dad" of the title is GI slang for "Baghdad"), and convey the thoughts and feelings of an uneasy U.S. soldier fighting in Iraq. It was subsequently used on the closing montage of the first episode of the third season of the American action crime drama television series Sons of Anarchy.

The cover photograph is taken from the Collection d'Adhémar de Panat.

== Reception ==
The albums' advance release enjoyed airplay on several radio stations and attracted generally favourable comments from the press and advance publicity for the album.

The album received very favourable reviews. Writing in The Guardian, Robin Denselow said: "He hasn't brought out his electric guitar to work with a band on an album of new songs in four years now, but it has been well worth the wait. He has always specialised in writing about loss, bitterness and horror, and this is one of the most brilliantly gloomy albums in his long career." Gemma Padley, writing for the BBC, said: "Sweet Warrior is a collection of songs that refuses to be taken too seriously. While the slower tracks radiate genuine feeling, the rambunctious up-tempo numbers evaluate with an ever-present cheeky glint in the eye – an eye that the irrepressible Thompson has firmly on the ball."

== Track listing ==
All songs written by Richard Thompson:

1. "Needle and Thread" – 4:43
2. "I'll Never Give It Up " – 3:22
3. "Take Care the Road You Choose" – 6:44
4. "Mr. Stupid" – 3:53
5. "Dad's Gonna Kill Me" – 5:16
6. "Poppy-Red" – 4:37
7. "Bad Monkey" – 5:13
8. "Francesca" – 5:17
9. "Too Late to Come Fishing" – 4:36
10. "Sneaky Boy" – 2:59
11. "She Sang Angels to Rest" – 3:25
12. "Johnny's Far Away" – 4:53
13. "Guns Are the Tongues" – 7:27
14. "Sunset Song" – 5:38

Bonus tracks on the P-Vine Records release for the Japanese market:

- "Any Old Body"
- "Dust and Wine"

== Personnel ==
=== Musical ===
- Richard Thompson – vocals, electric guitar, steel-string acoustic guitar, mandolin, accordion, tin whistle, autoharp, harmonium, hurdy-gurdy, electronic organ, handclaps (on 10), penny whistle (on 9)
- Michael Hays – rhythm guitar, electric guitar, acoustic guitar, backing vocals
- Danny Thompson – double bass
- Taras Prodaniuk – electric bass guitar
- Michael Jerome – drums, percussion
- Judith Owen – backing vocals, handclaps (on 10)
- Sara Watkins – fiddle (on 5, 12–13)
- Joe Sublett – tenor saxophone (on 7–8)
- Joe Buck – first violin (on 11)
- Al Michaels – second violin (on 11)
- Novi Ola – viola (on 11)
- Simon Tassano – handclaps (on 10)
- Chris Kasych – handclaps (on 10)

=== Technical ===
- Doug Tyo – engineer (at House of Blues Studio, Encino, California)
- Chris Kasych – assistant engineer
- Simon Tassano – mixing (at Rumiville Studio, Austin, Texas)
- Jim Wilson – mastering (at Airshow Mastering, Boulder, Colorado)

== Other sources ==
- Official credits page
- Sweet Warrior, Richard Thompson (2007), Proper Records: PRPCD032, sleeve notes
