= Live! (More or Less) =

Compilation album by Richard Thompson
- Released: 1976
- Recorded: 1969–1976
- Genre: Rock
- Length: 88:58
- Label: Island
- Producer: Richard Thompson, Richard Williams and John Wood

Richard Thompson chronology
(guitar, vocal) (1976)	Live! (More or Less) (1976)	Strict Tempo! (1981)

Live! (More or Less) is an album released in 1976 under Richard Thompson's name, but mostly consisting of work actually recorded with his then wife as Richard and Linda Thompson.

This was a U.S. only release. The first disc of the two-disc set is, in fact, the 1974 release I Want to See the Bright Lights Tonight by Richard and Linda Thompson. The second disc consists of eight tracks from the (guitar, vocal) compilation issued only in the UK, two of which were recorded live.

The album was critically well-received on its release, but only because it included I Want to See the Bright Lights Tonight, which had come to be very well regarded. Its ratings either reflect that fact or that it is redundant and only significant to completists.

Professional ratings
Review scores
Source	Rating
Allmusic	2/5 stars
Christgau's Record Guide	A−

== Track listing ==
All songs written by Richard Thompson except where indicated otherwise.

=== Disc one ===
Side one
No.	Title	Length
1.	"When I Get to the Border"	3:26
2.	"The Calvary Cross"	3:51
3.	"Withered and Died"	3:24
4.	"I Want to See the Bright Lights Tonight"	3:07
5.	"Down Where the Drunkards Roll"	4:05

Side two
No.	Title	Length
6.	"We Sing Hallelujah"	2:49
7.	"Has He Got a Friend for Me"	3:32
8.	"The Little Beggar Girl"	3:24
9.	"The End of the Rainbow"	3:55
10.	"The Great Valerio"	5:22

=== Disc two ===
Side one
No.	Title	Writer(s)	Length
1.	"The Ballad of Easy Rider"	Roger McGuinn	4:52
2.	"Poor Will and the Jolly Hangman"	Richard Thompson, Dave Swarbrick	5:31
3.	"A Heart Needs a Home"		4:00
4.	"The Dark End of the Street"	Dan Penn, Chips Moman	4:14
5.	"The Pitfall/The Excursion"		2:57
6.	"Flee as a Bird"	Traditional; arranged by Richard Thompson	3.12

Side two
No.	Title	Length
7.	"Night Comes In"	12:22
8.	"Calvary Cross"	13:24
