= Daring Adventures =

Studio album by Richard Thompson
- Released: June 1986
- Recorded: 1986
- Studio: Sunset Sound, Los Angeles
- Genre: Folk rock
- Length: 47:06
- Label: Polydor
- Producer: Mitchell Froom

Richard Thompson chronology
Across a Crowded Room (1985)	Daring Adventures (1986)	Amnesia (1988)

Professional ratings
Review scores
Source	Rating
AllMusic	3/5 stars
Encyclopedia of Popular Music	4/5 stars

Daring Adventures is the fifth studio album by Richard Thompson, released in 1986.

After sales of his 1985 release Across a Crowded Room had not met expectations, Thompson was under pressure from his record label to deliver with his next album.

The first Thompson album to be recorded in the US, Daring Adventures is a marked departure from its predecessors with a slicker, more commercial sound and backing provided by American session players. It marked the start of a controversial five-album collaboration between Thompson and new producer Mitchell Froom that was regarded, in some quarters, to have "Americanised" and commercialised Thompson's style and sound. The album is variously seen as a sell-out under pressure from a record company, or as an attempt to reach a wider audience.

With songs like "A Bone Through Her Nose", "Baby Talk" and "Valerie", the album also marked a shift in Thompson's songwriting away from the seemingly personal and towards the character portraits for which he has since become renowned. "Al Bowlly's in Heaven" and "How Will I Ever Be Simple Again" are two of Thompson's best-loved songs and concert staples; the latter is also one of the more frequently covered Thompson songs.

== Track listing ==
All songs written by Richard Thompson.

Side one

1. "A Bone Through Her Nose" – 4:04
2. "Valerie" – 4:13
3. "Missie How You Let Me Down" – 3:42
4. "Dead Man's Handle" – 3:50
5. "Long Dead Love" – 4:38
6. "Lover's Lane" – 3:28

Side two

1. "Nearly In Love" – 3:52
2. "Jennie" – 5:12
3. "Baby Talk" – 2:47
4. "Cash Down, Never Never" – 3:04
5. "How Will I Ever Be Simple Again" – 3:39
6. "Al Bowlly's in Heaven" – 4:27

== Personnel ==
- Richard Thompson - guitar, vocals, mandolin, dulcimer, theremin
- Mitchell Froom - keyboards, theremin
- Jerry Scheff - bass guitar, double bass
- Mickey Curry - drums
- Jim Keltner - drums
- Alex Acuña - percussion
- Christine Collister and Clive Gregson - backing vocals
- John Kirkpatrick - accordion, concertina
- Philip Pickett - shawm, crumhorn, recorder and symphony.
- Chuck Fleming - fiddle
- Brian Taylor, Tony Goddard, David Horn, Ian Peters - brass
