= Judith Owen =

Welsh singer-songwriter (born 1969)

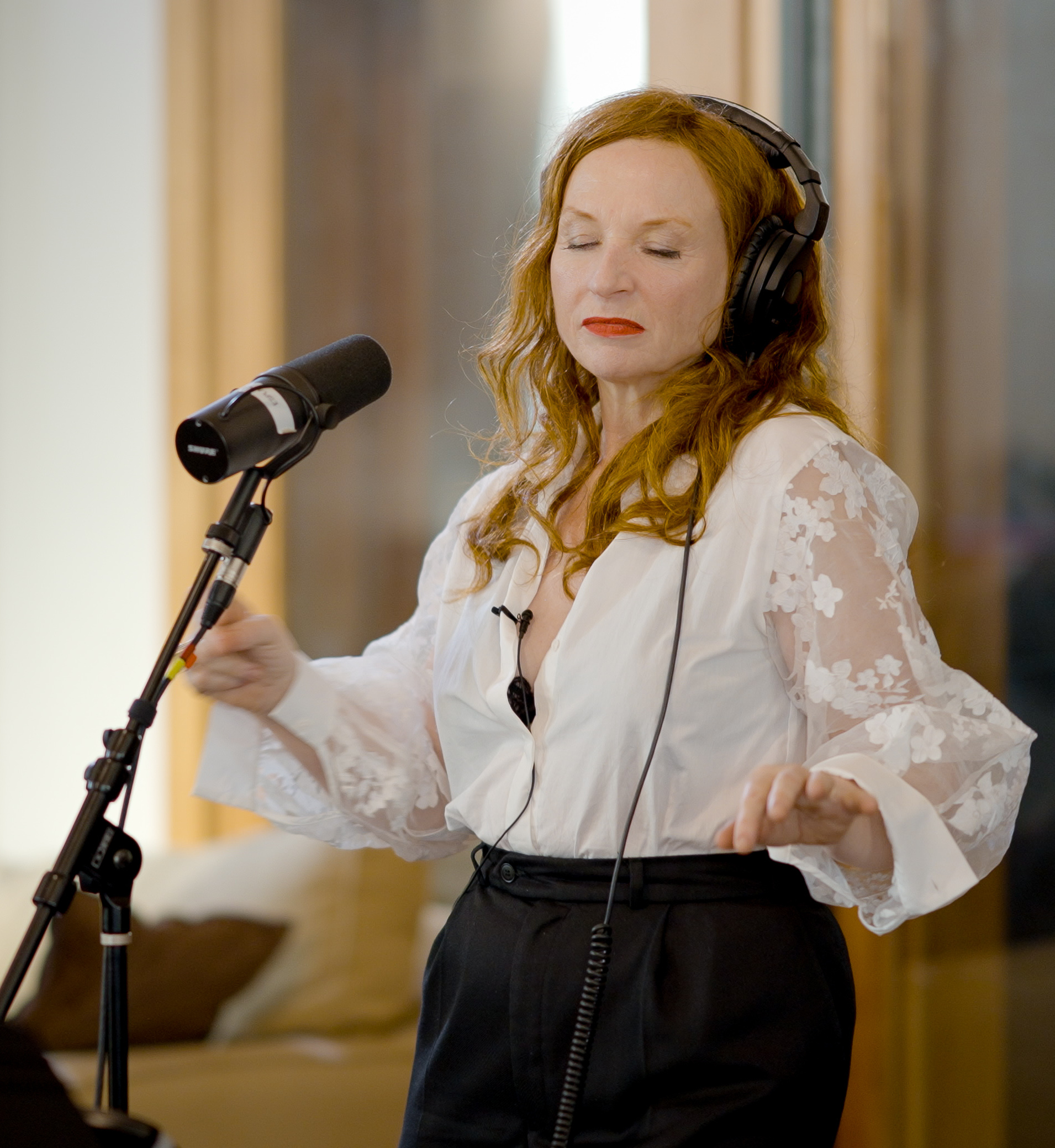
- Owen at Esplanade Studios

Background information
- Born: 2 January 1969 (age 57); London, England
- Origin: Wales
- Occupation: Singer-songwriter
- Years active: 1996–present
- Spouse: Harry Shearer (m. 1993)
- Website: judithowen.net

Judith Owen (born 2 January 1969) is a Welsh singer-songwriter. Her first album, Emotions on a Postcard, was released in 1996 and has been followed by several more. She is co-founder of Twanky Records with her husband, Harry Shearer.

== Life and career ==
Owen is the daughter of Welsh opera singer Handel Owen and is originally from Llanelli, although born in London. She performed on West Virginia Public Radio's Mountain Stage on 10 September 2006 and was interviewed on National Public Radio's (NPR) Weekend Edition Sunday on 17 June 2007, on which she performed several of her songs from her 2007 release Happy This Way. Her cover of Deep Purple's "Smoke on the Water" has been used as bumper music on Coast to Coast AM.

In 2008 she released Mopping Up Karma, followed by 2010's The Beautiful Damage Collection (a compilation album).

On 18 September 2008, a three-song live video performance premiered on LiveDaily Sessions, featuring the songs: "Creatures", "I Promise You" and "Let's Hear It For Love". On 25 October 2008, Owen performed "Creatures of Habit" on Public Radio International's What d'Ya Know with Michael Feldman.

She has recorded and toured with Richard Thompson in recent years, notably on the 1000 Years of Popular Music recording and tour. She has also appeared on his albums The Old Kit Bag and Sweet Warrior.

Owen appeared as herself on The Simpsons in the thirteenth-season episode "The Blunder Years" and sang the song "600" for the show's 600th episode, "Treehouse of Horror XXVII".

On 10 February 2011 she appeared on BBC Breakfast alongside Ruby Wax, promoting their new show, Losing It.

Her tenth studio album, Ebb & Flow was released on 7 April (UK) and 6 May 2014 (US and Canada); it features Leland Sklar on bass and Russell Kunkel on drums – both former members of The Section – and Waddy Wachtel on guitar. Ebb & Flow was her first album to be released and promoted throughout Europe and received critical acclaim from The Independent (UK), The Sunday Times, Le Figaro (France), La Repubblica (Italy), CronacaTorino.it (Italy), BT (Denmark), and Rolling Stone (Germany) with radio play from RTÉ Radio 1 (Ireland), BBC Radio 2, RTVE Radio 3 (Spain), P5 (Denmark) and YLE Radio Suomi (Finland).

In 2015 she was invited to support Bryan Ferry on his UK tour. The London Royal Albert Hall Show on 1 June was cancelled at the last minute due to Ferry having a throat infection. Several journalists were attending to review her and an impromptu decision was made to invite them all to her London home, where she performed the planned set acoustically. The Independent ran an article the following day and highlighted it on a feature of living-room shows. She performed at the Cropredy Festival in Oxfordshire and the MadGarden Festival in Madrid.

In 2016 Owen released the album Somebody's Child in the UK, Europe, Australia and Japan. In June 2016, she showcased the album in Melbourne and Sydney to rave reviews including Noise11.com. The same year, Owen and Harry Shearer performed together in Brisbane and at the Adelaide Cabaret Festival with a new show called This Infernal Racket, which created massive media coverage of this as well as her album.

The 2016 annual charity show Christmas Without Tears returned to London along with New York, Chicago, Los Angeles and New Orleans.

Touring in UK, Sweden, Norway, Germany, Austria, France, Italy, Netherlands, Ireland is planned.

In 2017, Somebody's Child was released in the US and Canada, while touring throughout the year.

In May 2018 redisCOVERed her first all-covers album was released, featuring covers of songs by Deep Purple ("Smoke on the Water"), Soundgarden ("Black Hole Sun"), Donna Summer ("Hot Stuff"), Wild Cherry ("Play That Funky Music"), Drake ("Hotline Bling"), Ed Sheeran ("Shape of You") and Joni Mitchell ("Cherokee Louise" and "Ladies' Man").

== Personal life ==
Owen was born in London, but her mother was from Kidwelly and her father, a singer with the chorus of Covent Garden for 35 years, was from Llanelli. When she was 15 years old, her mother died by suicide after suffering from mental illness.

Owen has been married to actor Harry Shearer since 1993. They launched their own record label, Courgette Records, in 2005.

== Discography ==
=== Albums ===
- Emotions on a Postcard (1996), Dog on the Bed Music
- Limited Edition (2000), Dog on the Bed Music
- Twelve Arrows (2003), Dog on the Bed Music
- Lost And Found (2005), Courgette
- Here (2006), Courgette
- Happy This Way (2007), Courgette
- Mopping Up Karma (2008), Courgette
- The Beautiful Damage Collection (2010), Courgette
- Some Kind of Comfort (2012), Courgette
- Ebb & Flow (2014), Twanky Records
- Somebody's Child (2016), Twanky Records
- RedisCOVERed (2018), Twanky Records
- Come On & Get It (2022), Twanky Records
- Suit Yourself (2026), Twanky Records

=== Singles ===
- "Creatures of Habit" (2008), Courgette Records
- "White Christmas" (with Julia Fordham) (2013), Little Boo Records
- "In the Summertime" (2014), Twanky Records
- "Hot Stuff" (2017), Twanky Records

=== EPs ===
- Christmas in July (2004), Century of Progress Productions
- The Here & Now (2020), Twanky Records
