= Pete Zorn =

American musician (1950–2016)

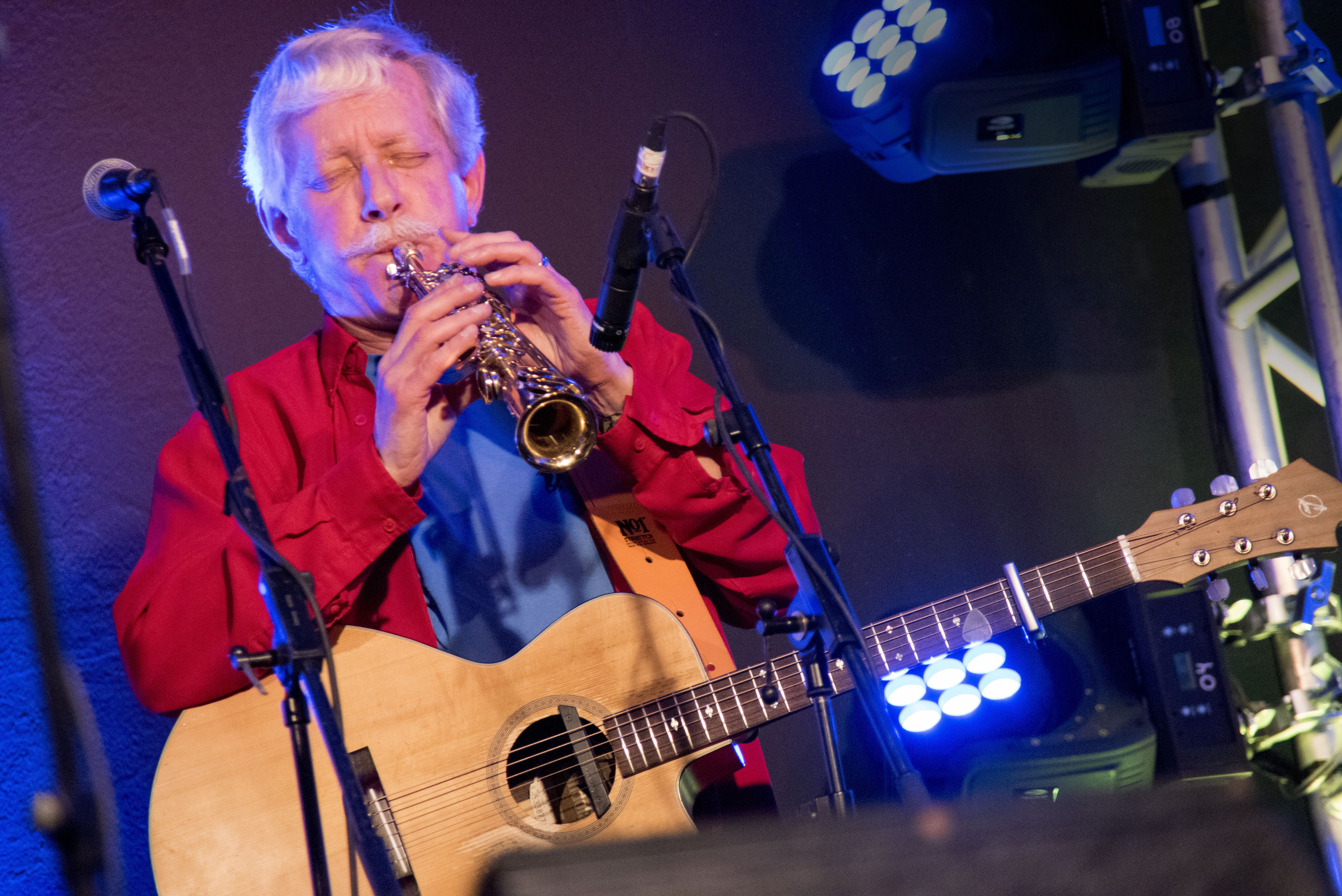

Background information
- Born: Peter Zorn; May 29, 1950; Somerset, Pennsylvania, U.S.
- Died: April 19, 2016 (aged 65) London, U.K.
- Genres: British folk rock; Americana
- Occupation: Musician
- Instruments: Mandolin; saxophone; guitar; bass; flute; tin whistle; vocals
- Formerly of: Steeleye Span; The Albion Band; Driver 67
- Website: richardthompson-music.com

Pete Zorn (May 29, 1950 – April 19, 2016) was an American multi-instrumentalist who was a longstanding member of Richard Thompson's backing band. He was also a member of Steeleye Span, The Albion Band, and Driver 67.

== Career ==
As a member of Thompson's backing group, Zorn played acoustic guitar, mandolin, saxophone, flute, and tin whistle and acted as a backing vocalist. He was also a bass guitarist.

Zorn performed on Thompson's albums Hand of Kindness (1983), Sweet Talker (1991), and Dream Attic (2010). He was also one of two credited bass guitarists on the 1982 Richard & Linda Thompson album Shoot Out the Lights.

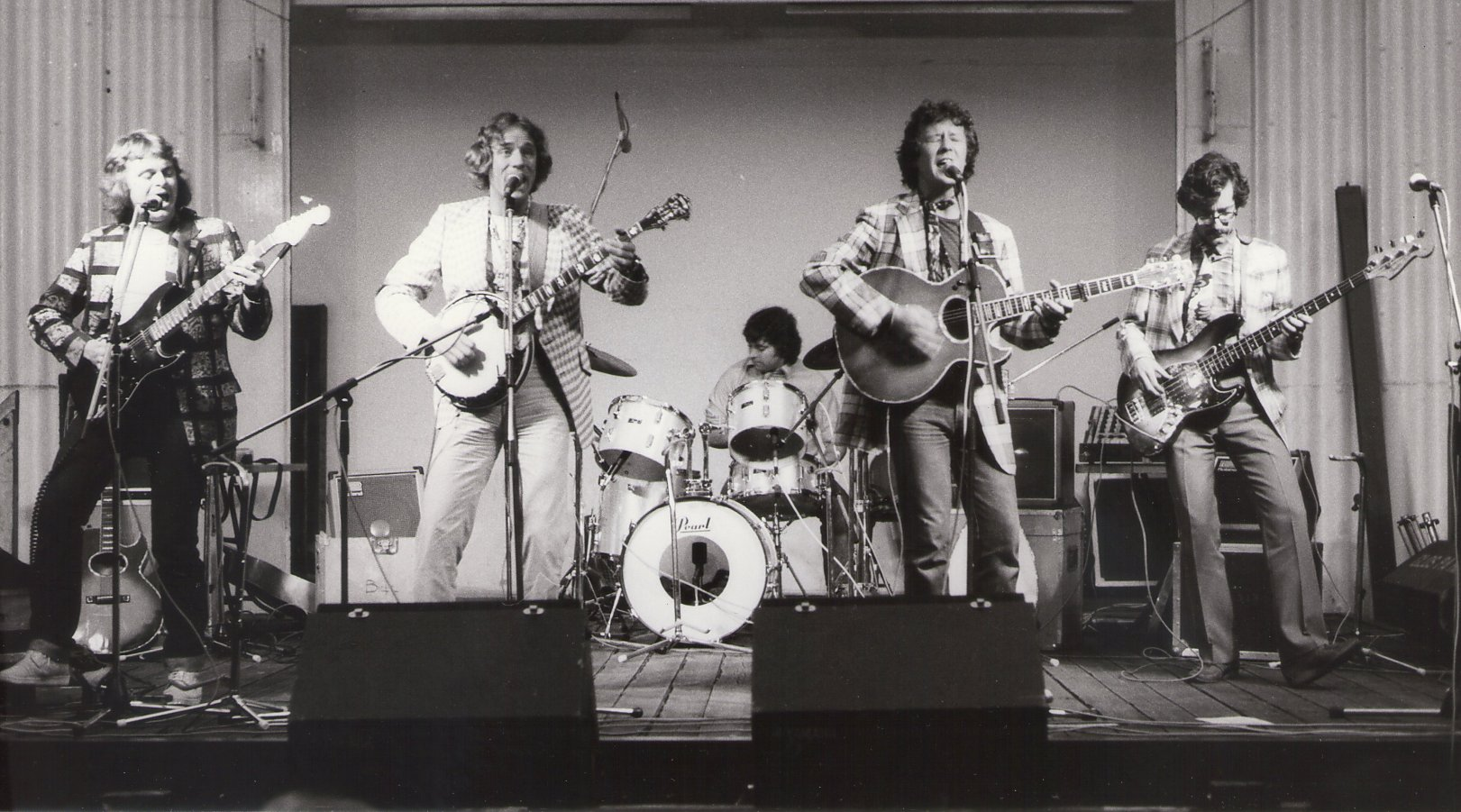
Pete Zorn on stage with the Arizona Smoke Revue in 1982 (Pete Zorn at right, playing electric bass guitar)

Although he frequently toured with Thompson, Zorn had also played with many other singers and groups including Arizona Smoke Revue, formed by older brother Bill Zorn, Show of Hands, the Phil Beer Band, Elaine Paige, Thomas Anders, Gerry Rafferty, Barbara Dickson, Chris Rainbow, and his band WAZ, which features Steve Tilston.

He appeared in the UK top 10 in 1979 as part of Driver 67 with his brother-in-law Paul Phillips on the single "Car 67". He and Phillips met when Zorn came to London with Fishbaugh, Fishbaugh, and Zorn, a three-piece folk rock band signed to CBS Records in London. Because of his talent on so many instruments and his vocal range, Zorn became a staple of many sessions produced by Phillips in the early and mid-seventies. After the hit with "Car 67", they made an album called Hey Mister Record Man, under the name Tax Loss. Bill and Conrad Zorn also played.

In 1988 Zorn played the alto saxophone to the theme song of the British children's television series TUGS (which only aired on ITV once in 1989 and only lasted for 13 episodes) with the series' composers Mike O'Donnell and Junior Campbell (who were also friends of his and have also composed music for the original series of Thomas the Tank Engine and Friends of whom many of the crew members including former director David Mitton had worked on TUGS) composing the music.

In 2009 Zorn joined Steeleye Span on the spring section of the band's 40th anniversary tour, replacing Rick Kemp, who was absent for health reasons. He also replaced Kemp on the American and Australian legs of the tour. Kemp returned for the winter leg of the tour, but Zorn stayed with the band as a guitarist and multi-instrumentalist due to various strains on the band.

He played on the albums Now We Are Six Again and Wintersmith and appeared on all Steeleye tours until spring 2015, when he left the band.

== Death ==
Zorn died on April 19, 2016, of cancer. His death was announced by Zorn's family, and by Thompson, on their respective Facebook pages.

== Discography ==
=== With Richard Thompson ===
Pete Zorn was a member of Thompson's touring band from 1982 to 1984 and from 1991 onwards and appears on all his live albums recorded with a band from then until 2010.

- Shoot Out the Lights (1982)
- Hand of Kindness (1983)
- Sweet Talker (1991)
- Two Letter Words (1996)
- Semi-Detached Mock Tudor (2002)
- Live Warrior (2007)
- Dream Attic (2010)
- Live at the BBC (2011)
- Cabaret of Souls (2012)
- Live at Rockpalast (recorded during the 1983-4 Hand of Kindness tour) (2017)

=== With Gerry Rafferty ===
- Snakes and Ladders (1980)
- North and South (1988)
- Over My Head (1994)

=== With The Albion Band ===
- Give Me A Saddle, I'll Trade You A Car (as Albion Band '89) (1989)
- An Evening With The Albion Band (2002)

=== With Steeleye Span ===
- Now We Are Six Again (2011)
- Wintersmith (2013)
