= Jo-El Sonnier =

American singer-songwriter (1946–2024)

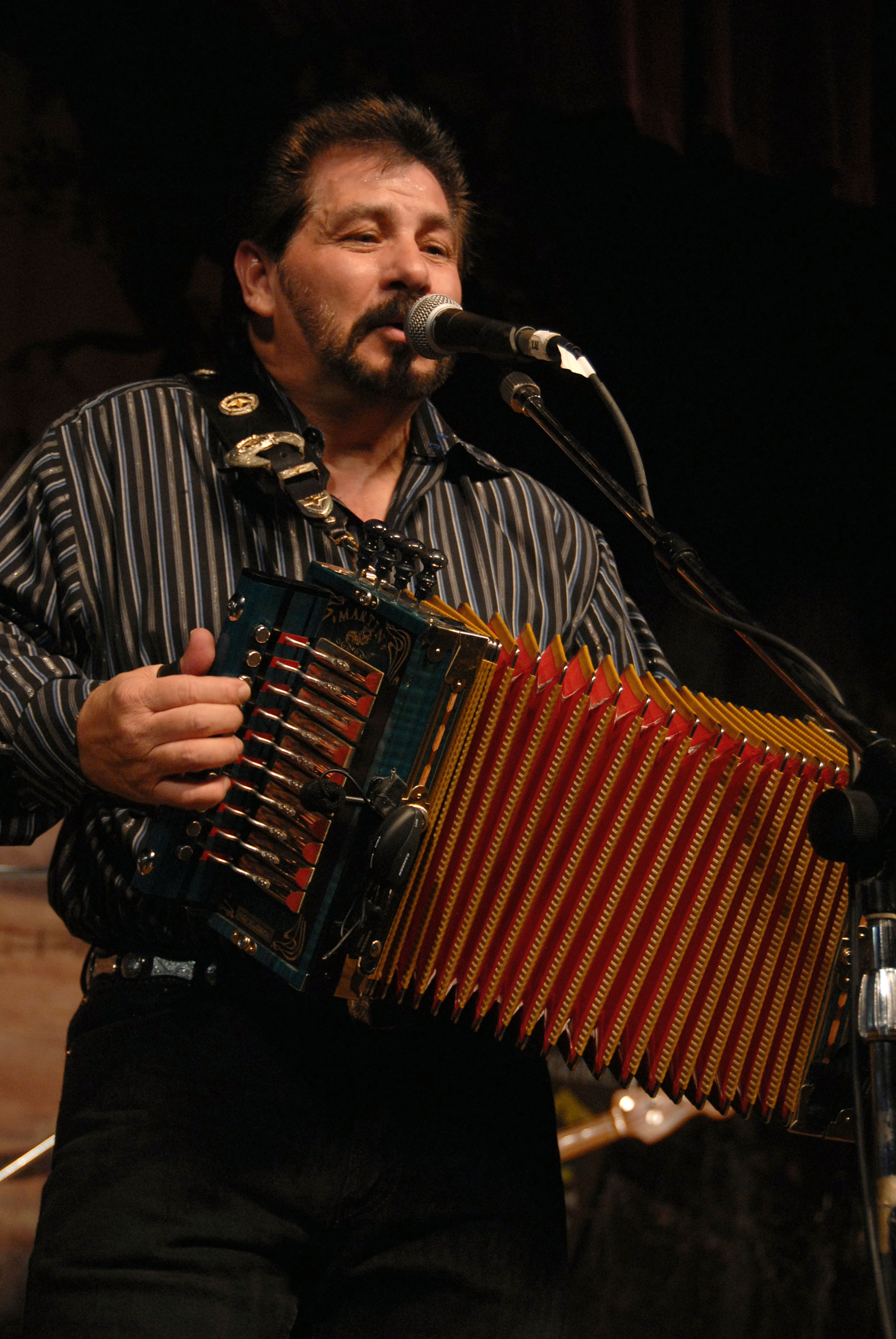
- Sonnier in 2006

Background information
- Born: Joel Sonnier; October 2, 1946; Rayne, Louisiana, U.S.
- Died: January 13, 2024 (aged 77) Llano, Texas, U.S.
- Genres: Country, Cajun
- Occupations: Singer-songwriter
- Instruments: Cajun accordion, guitar, harmonica, vocals
- Years active: 1967–2024
- Labels: Goldband, Mercury, Rounder, RCA, Capitol, Liberty
- Website: http://www.jo-elsonnier.com/

Jo-El Sonnier (/ʒoʊˌɛl sɒnˈjeɪ/; born Joel Sonnier; October 2, 1946 – January 13, 2024) was an American singer-songwriter and accordionist who performed country music and Cajun music. Originally signed to Mercury Nashville Records, Sonnier charted several minor singles on the Billboard country charts in the late 1970s. By the late 1980s, he had signed to RCA Records, breaking through with the Top Ten hits "No More One More Time" and a cover of Richard Thompson's "Tear-Stained Letter". Although his chart success waned at the beginning of the 1990s, he continued recording music, releasing more than thirty albums primarily on independent labels.

== Biography ==
Jo-El Sonnier was born to French-speaking sharecroppers in Rayne, Louisiana, on October 2, 1946. At age three, he began to play his brother's accordion and quickly proved himself adept. By age six, Sonnier had performed on the radio; at age 11, he made his first recordings. He also released several independent singles and four albums as a teenager. By the 1970s, he was signed to Mercury Nashville Records, but without much success in the country music field.

Sonnier temporarily abandoned his pursuit of a country music career in favor of recording Cajun music on the independent Rounder Records label. Although his independent album did not produce much commercial success, it was nominated for a Grammy Award. After being signed as Merle Haggard's opening act, Sonnier later decided to return to country music; he was signed to RCA Records in the 1980s, where his biggest successes came in the singles "No More One More Time" and a cover of British singer Richard Thompson's "Tear-Stained Letter", songs which landed in the Top 10 on the country charts. Sonnier and Thompson performed the song together for a 1990 appearance on the American series Night Music (season 2, episode 16).

In the 1990s, Sonnier moved to Capitol Records, but his solo career faltered soon afterwards. He continued to find success as a session musician, and briefly took up acting as well. In the late 1990s, he returned to Rounder Records to record Cajun music once more, occasionally collaborating with Michael Doucet of BeauSoleil. Sonnier also saw his second Grammy nomination, for the 1997 album Cajun Pride; a third soon followed with 2001's Cajun Blood being nominated for Best Traditional Folk Album.

In 2009, Sonnier was inducted into the Louisiana Music Hall of Fame.

Sonnier made a brief cameo appearance as a member of a dance band in the third episode of the first season of the HBO crime series True Detective, which is set in southern Louisiana.

On February 8, 2015, Sonnier won a Grammy Award for Best Regional Roots Music Album.

Sonnier died of a heart attack on January 13, 2024, just after a performance at Llano Country Opry in Llano, Texas, where he had played for over an hour and received a standing ovation. His performance ended with his signature "Tear-Stained Letter" and an encore of "Jambalaya". He was 77.

== Personal life ==
In 2017, Sonnier self-published a book titled The Little Boy Under the Wagon, in which he revealed that he had been diagnosed with Asperger syndrome.

== Discography ==
=== Albums ===
Year	Album	Chart Positions	Label
Year	Album	US Country	Label
1967	Hurricane Audry	—	Goldband
1968	The Scene Today in Cajun Music	—	Goldband
1969	The Cajun Valentino	—	Goldband
1980	Cajun Life	—	Rounder
1987	Come On Joe	17	RCA
1989	Right Next Door to Texas	—	Goldband
1989	The Cajun Troubadour	—	Goldband
1990	Have a Little Faith	45	RCA
1991	Tears of Joy	—	Capitol
1992	Hello Happiness Again	—	Liberty
1992	Complete Mercury Session	—	Mercury
1994	Cajun Roots	—	Rounder
1995	Cajun Kids	—	Little Morganville
1996	Live in Canada	—	Stony Plain
1996	Cookin' Cajun (with Eddy Raven)	—	K-Tel
1997	Cajun Young Blood	—	Ace
1997	Cajun Pride	—	Rounder
1998	Here to Stay	—	Intersound
1998	Cajun Memories	—	Green Hill
1999	Cajun Blood	—	Musique de' Jo-El
2000	Cajun Tradition	—	Green Hill
2001	The L.A. Sessions	—	Musique de' Jo-El
2004	Yesterdays with Jo-El Sonnier	—	Green Hill
2004	Cajun Christmas	—	Green Hill
2004	Cajun Hymns	—	Green Hill
2004	Cajun Mardis Gras	—	Green Hill
2005	Back by Request	—	Musique de' Jo-El
2013	The Legacy	—	Takau Records
"—" denotes releases that did not chart

=== Singles ===
Year	Single	Peak chart positions		Album
Year	Single	US Country	CAN Country	Album
1975	"I've Been Around Enough to Know"	78	—	—N/a
1976	"Always Late (With Your Kisses)"	99	—	—N/a
1976	"He's Still All Over You"	100	—	—N/a
1987	"Come On Joe"	39	—	Come On Joe
1988	"No More One More Time"	7	2	Come On Joe
1988	"Tear-Stained Letter"	9	5	Come On Joe
1989	"Rainin' in My Heart"	35	34	Come On Joe
1989	"(Blue, Blue, Blue) Blue, Blue"	47	50	Have a Little Faith
1990	"If Your Heart Should Ever Roll This Way Again"	24	26	Have a Little Faith
1990	"The Scene of the Crime"	65	46	Have a Little Faith
1991	"You May Change Your Mind"	—	—	Tears of Joy
1998	"Broken Hearted Side of New Orleans"	—	—	Here to Stay
"—" denotes releases that did not chart

=== Guest singles ===
Year	Single	Artist	Album
1998	"Catahoula"	The Bellamy Brothers (with Eddy Raven)	Over the Line

=== Music videos ===
Year	Video	Director
1988	"Tear-Stained Letter"	S. A. Baron
1988	"Rainin' in My Heart"	Steve Boyle
1989	"(Blue, Blue, Blue) Blue, Blue"	Jim May
1989	"If Your Heart Should Ever Roll This Way Again"	Jim May
1990	"The Scene of the Crime"	
1996	"Fais Do Do" (with Eddy Raven)	Bob Whitt
1997	"Sugar Bee" (with Eddy Raven)	
1998	"Catahoula" (with The Bellamy Brothers and Eddy Raven)	chris rogers [sic]

== Awards and nominations ==
=== Grammy Awards ===
Year	Nominee / work	Award	Result
2015	The Legacy	Best Regional Roots Music Album	Won

=== Academy of Country Music Awards ===
Year	Nominee / work	Award	Result
1988	Jo-El Sonnier	Top New Male Vocalist	Nominated
