= Pour Down Like Silver =

Studio album by Richard and Linda Thompson
- Released: November 1975
- Recorded: Summer 1975
- Studios: Sound Techniques, London
- Genre: Folk rock
- Length: 40:40
- Label: Island
- Producers: Richard Thompson, John Wood

Richard Thompson chronology
Hokey Pokey (1975)	Pour Down Like Silver (1975)	(guitar, vocal) (1976)

Linda Thompson chronology
Hokey Pokey (1975)	Pour Down Like Silver (1975)	First Light (1978)

Professional ratings
Review scores
Source	Rating
Christgau's Record Guide	B+
The Encyclopedia of Popular Music	4/5 stars

Pour Down Like Silver is the third album by the British duo of singer-songwriter and guitarist Richard and vocalist Linda Thompson. It was recorded in the summer of 1975 and released in November 1975 on the Island Records label.

== Background ==
The Thompsons had adopted the Sufi faith in 1974 and had moved into a commune in London. The songs on this album reflect their new faith and the relief that Richard Thompson had found in that faith.

It seems that various and conflicting pressures were bearing down on the duo at the time.

- Linda Thompson: '...At one point our Sheikh forbade Richard to do music... On the other hand, he always encouraged me, "you have a voice and you've got to sing".'
- Jo Lustig (managing the Thompsons at the time): 'Richard came to me and said "look, my Mullah doesn't want me to play electric guitar. I don't know what I'm going to do about my career... I'm not going to be working."'

And there was a recording contract. The Thompsons owed Island Records an album. The compromise seems to have been that the album to be delivered was to have a strong spiritual aspect. Linda Thompson later explained: "Pour Down Like Silver was when Sheikh Abdul Q'adir said we could make music as long as it was to God... "Dimming of the Day", "Beat the Retreat", "Night Comes In", they're all about God, and considering they're all about God some of them aren't bad."

Despite these surrounding constraints and conflicts, the album is recognisably a Richard and Linda Thompson album in terms of melodies and the lyrical style.

Pour Down Like Silver was recorded at Sound Techniques studio in London, with engineer John Wood. Richard Thompson would have been familiar with both engineer and studio from his time with Fairport Convention. Joe Boyd, who had both produced and managed Fairport, did the vast majority of his production work at Sound Techniques and with Wood at the controls.

Richard Thompson had left Fairport Convention in 1971 with a considerable reputation as an electric guitar soloist. However, the first few albums of his post-Fairport career had placed more emphasis on the vocals and the songs themselves. As noted above, Thompson was under increasing pressure from his spiritual teacher to abandon the electric guitar. Certainly what recent live work there had been had placed the emphasis on acoustic guitar.

So it was notable that Pour Down Like Silver and the live shows either side of the album's release saw Thompson's electric guitar returning to the spotlight. Concert performances featured extended guitar solos on "The Calvary Cross" (from I Want to See the Bright Lights Tonight) and on "Night Comes In" and "For Shame of Doing Wrong" from the newly released Pour Down Like Silver.

The electric guitar is prominent indeed on this the third Richard and Linda album. More so because of the sparser arrangements and production that distinguish this album from its more lush sounding predecessor. Subsequently, Thompson disclosed that this stark and simple production was more by accident than design: "It was a stark record, but I think it was by accident in a sense – we were intending to have Simon [Nicol] come and play rhythm guitar but he wasn't available so everything ended up sounding very stark and I was always going to overdub rhythm guitar and stuff, but we thought we’ll just leave it, what the hell."

Thompson may perhaps be regarded as being a little too off-hand here. In fact he overdubbed mandolin, keyboard and multiple guitar parts on some tracks, and session musicians were also called in. Another noticeable instrumental element of the album is the accordion of John Kirkpatrick which is prominent both on this album and during the Thompsons' live shows in 1975.

The understated and elegant "Dimming of the Day" was sung by Linda Thompson on this album, but Richard Thompson has continued to feature it in his own live shows for many years – an indication of its deep personal significance. This song is an example of Thompson writing in a centuries-old Sufic tradition of expressing divine love in earthly terms. On the album "Dimming of the Day" segues into a solo guitar performance of Scots composer James Scott Skinner's "Dargai" that perfectly matches the mood of the song and serves to bring the album to a contemplative conclusion.

"Night Comes In" is another song of profound personal significance and recounts Richard Thompson's formal initiation into the Sufi faith. The song is also notable for several prominent passages of electric guitar playing notable for their lyrical intensity – especially the closing, multi-tracked solo.

"Hard Luck Stories" is the most musically upbeat song on the album, with sardonic lyrics and a typically incisive guitar solo.

After this album and the following short tour, Richard and Linda Thompson took a sabbatical from recording, writing and performing music.

== Reception ==
Writing in 2000, Robert Christgau describes the album as "semimiraculous" and one of the Thompsons' four "knockout" albums.

== Track listing ==
All songs written by Richard Thompson, except "Dargai" by J. Scott Skinner, arranged by Thompson.

Side one

1. "Streets of Paradise" – 4:17
2. "For Shame of Doing Wrong" – 4:44
3. "The Poor Boy Is Taken Away" – 3:35
4. "Night Comes In" – 8:12

Side two

1. "Jet Plane in a Rocking Chair" – 2:48
2. "Beat the Retreat" – 5:52
3. "Hard Luck Stories" – 3:51
4. "Dimming of the Day/Dargai" – 7:16

Bonus tracks Available on 2004 Island Reissue

9. "Streets of Paradise" (live) – 3:57
10. "Night Comes In" (live) – 12:22
11. "Dark End of the Street" (live) (Chips Moman, Dan Penn) – 4:16
12. "Beat the Retreat" (live) – 6:25

== Personnel ==
- Richard Thompson – guitar, vocals, mandolin (3,7), banjo (8), Appalachian dulcimer (3,6), Hammered dulcimer (4), harmonium (8), electric piano (8)
- Linda Thompson – vocals
- Timi Donald – drums (3–6,8)
- Pat Donaldson – bass guitar (3–6,8)
- Dave Mattacks – drums (1,2,7)
- Dave Pegg – bass guitar (1,2,7)
- John Kirkpatrick – accordion (1,2,5,7), concertina
- Ian Whiteman – flute (5,8), shakuhachi (6)
- Aly Bain – fiddle (2,5)
- Nic Jones – fiddle (2,5)
- Henry Lowther – trumpet
- Clare Lowther – cello (2,5)
- Jack Brymer – clarinet (8)

== Cover version ==
Sandy Denny covered "For Shame of Doing Wrong" under the title "I Wish I Was a Fool for You (For Shame of Doing Wrong)" on her album Rendezvous.
