= Shoot Out the Lights =

Studio album by Richard and Linda Thompson
- Released: 15 March 1982
- Recorded: November 1981
- Studios: Olympic, London
- Genres: Folk rock; country rock
- Length: 38:15
- Label: Hannibal
- Producer: Joe Boyd

Richard and Linda Thompson chronology
Sunnyvista (1979)	Shoot Out the Lights (1982)	The Best of Richard & Linda Thompson: The Island Records Years (2000)

Richard Thompson chronology
Strict Tempo! (1981)	Shoot Out the Lights (1982)	Hand of Kindness (1983)

Linda Thompson chronology
Sunnyvista (1979)	Shoot Out the Lights (1982)	One Clear Moment (1985)

Singles from Shoot Out the Lights
- 1. "Don't Renege on Our Love" Released: April 1982

Shoot Out the Lights is the sixth and final album by British husband-and-wife rock duo Richard and Linda Thompson. It was produced by Joe Boyd and released in 1982 on his Hannibal label. A critically acclaimed work, AllMusic's Mark Deming noted that Shoot Out the Lights has "often been cited as Richard Thompson's greatest work."

== History ==
After their 1979 album Sunnyvista had sold poorly, Richard and Linda Thompson found themselves without a record deal. In the spring of 1980 they toured as the support act for Gerry Rafferty and in June of that year they recorded some demo tracks at Woodworm Studios in Oxfordshire.

Later that same year and with the Thompsons still without a contract, Rafferty offered to finance and produce a new Richard and Linda Thompson album and then use his contacts in the industry to secure a contract for the album's release. The Rafferty-sponsored album was recorded during September and October 1980 at Chipping Norton Recording Studios in Oxfordshire.

As the project proceeded, there was increasing tension between Richard Thompson and Rafferty. Thompson preferred a spontaneous approach to recording and found Rafferty's time-consuming and perfectionist approach hard to cope with. He also felt increasingly frozen out of the project: "When he got to the mixing, I just didn’t bother to turn up . . . because if I said something it was totally ignored and I thought 'hey, whose record is this anyway?'" When the sessions were completed, Rafferty could not interest any record companies and lost in the region of £30,000 on the project. Copies of the tapes of the Rafferty-sponsored album have subsequently become available as a bootleg under the titles Rafferty's Folly and Before Joe Could Pull the Trigger.

In the summer of 1981 Joe Boyd signed the Thompsons to his small Hannibal label and, in November of that year, the Thompsons went into Olympic Studios in London and recorded a new album. Boyd's proposal, which the Thompsons accepted, was that the album be recorded in a matter of days so that money could be put aside for a tour of the US. The resulting Shoot Out the Lights included fresh recordings of six songs that had been recorded during the Rafferty-sponsored sessions and two newer songs. Linda Thompson was several months pregnant when the album was recorded and so there was no prospect of an immediate release or supporting tour. By the time the album was released, Richard and Linda Thompson's marriage was over.

Shoot Out the Lights became their best-selling album and was acclaimed as one of their greatest artistic achievements. The album and the May 1982 tour were crucial in re-launching Richard Thompson's career and in restoring his reputation as a songwriter and guitar player.

== Critical response ==
Professional ratings
Review scores
Source	Rating
AllMusic	5/5 stars
Robert Christgau	A
The Encyclopedia of Popular Music	5/5 stars
(The New) Rolling Stone Album Guide	5/5 stars
Spin Alternative Record Guide	10/10

For a release on an independent label, Shoot Out the Lights had a significant critical impact. Robert Christgau designated it as the "pick hit" of the month in his "Consumer Guide" column, saying "these are powerfully double-edged metaphors for the marriage struggle". At the end of 1982, many critics placed the album on their year-end "best of" lists, for example, placing it at number two on The Village Voice Pazz & Jop Critics Poll, behind Elvis Costello's Imperial Bedroom. It has continued to be highly regarded. AllMusic praises it as "a meditation on love and loss in which beauty, passion, and heady joy can still be found in defeat". (The New) Rolling Stone Album Guide called the album "absolutely perfect" and cited it for its "vividly emotional writing and the stirringly impassioned playing".

In 1987 Shoot Out the Lights was ranked number 24 on Rolling Stone magazine's "100 Best Albums of the Last 20 Years" and in 1989 it was ranked number 9 on the same magazine's list of The 100 Best Albums of the Eighties. The album was ranked number 332 on its list of the 500 greatest albums of all time. It was voted number 422 in the third edition of Colin Larkin's All Time Top 1000 Albums (2000). In March 2005, Q magazine placed the title song at number 99 in its list of the 100 Greatest Guitar Tracks.

== Release history ==
In 1990 Hannibal released Shoot Out the Lights on CD with the B-side "Living in Luxury" as a bonus track on the first run. This song is not included on any subsequent editions of the album. In 1993 Rykodisc released it as part of their AU20 Mastering Gold CD series, with Dr. Toby Mountain of Northeastern Digital Recording, Inc., in Southborough, Massachusetts using Sony's proprietary Super Bit Mapping (SBM) mastering process to reduce the digital master from 20-bit to 16-bit required for the Red Book compact disc standard. Mountain again remastered the album in 2004 for release on Super Audio CD (SACD) on Rykodisc. In 2005 the album was reissued on 180 gram vinyl by the US 4 Men With Beards label. In October 2010 Rhino Handmade issued a deluxe 2CD edition of the album with 11 live bonus tracks and a 40-page booklet.

== Track listing ==
All songs written by Richard Thompson except as noted.

=== Side one ===
1. "Don't Renege on Our Love" – 4:19
2. "Walking on a Wire" – 5:29
3. "Man in Need" – 3:36
4. "Just the Motion" – 6:19

=== Side two ===
5. "Shoot Out the Lights" – 5:24
6. "Back Street Slide" – 4:33
7. "Did She Jump or Was She Pushed?" (Richard Thompson, Linda Thompson) – 4:52
8. "Wall of Death" – 3:43

"Living in Luxury" (2:32) was a B-side included as a bonus track on early CDs of the album, though removed from later editions.

=== 2010 "De luxe" edition ===
A two-disc "de luxe" edition of this album was issued by Rhino Handmade Records in October 2010. The first disc had the eight tracks of the original album. The second disc comprised live tracks recorded during the 1982 tour of the US.

The tracks on the second disc are:

1. "Dargai" (J. Scott Skinner, arranged by Richard Thompson)
2. "Back Street Slide"
3. "Pavanne" (Richard Thompson, Linda Thompson)
4. "I'll Keep It with Mine" (Bob Dylan)
5. "Borrowed Time"
6. "Did She Jump or Was She Pushed?" (Richard Thompson, Linda Thompson)
7. "I'm a Dreamer" (Sandy Denny)
8. "Honky Tonk Blues" (Hank Williams)
9. "Shoot Out the Lights"
10. "For Shame of Doing Wrong"
11. "Dimming of the Day"
12. "The Price of Love" (Don Everly, Phil Everly) (bonus track)

(all tracks composed by Richard Thompson except where noted otherwise)

== Personnel ==
The same core band appeared on the original album and on the 2010 live disc, except for Dave Pegg who is on the album only.

- Richard Thompson – vocals, lead guitar, accordion, hammered dulcimer
- Linda Thompson – vocals
- Simon Nicol – rhythm guitar
- Dave Pegg – bass (3, 6, 7, 8)
- Pete Zorn – bass (1, 2, 4, 5 and all of the 2010 deluxe edition live disc), backing vocals
- David Mattacks – drums

Additional personnel

- The Watersons (Norma, Mike, Lal and Martin Carthy) – backing vocals
- Clive Gregson – backing vocals
- Stephen Corbett – cornet
- Brian Jones – cornet
- Phil Goodwin – tuba
- Stephen Barnett – trombone
- Mark Cutts – trombone

Technical

- Bill Gill – engineer
- Gered Mankowitz – cover photography
