= I Want to See the Bright Lights Tonight =

Studio album by Richard and Linda Thompson
- Released: 30 April 1974
- Recorded: May 1973
- Studios: Sound Techniques, Chelsea, London
- Genres: Folk rock; singer-songwriter
- Length: 36:55 (original); 53:26 (2004 reissue)
- Labels: Island (original 1974 UK release), Hannibal (1983 US, Canada, and Europe release)
- Producers: Richard Thompson; John Wood

Richard Thompson chronology
Henry the Human Fly (1972)	I Want to See the Bright Lights Tonight (1974)	Hokey Pokey (1975)

Linda Thompson chronology
I Want to See the Bright Lights Tonight (1974)	Hokey Pokey (1975)

Singles from I Want to See the Bright Lights Tonight
- 1. "I Want to See the Bright Lights Tonight" Released: January 1974

I Want to See the Bright Lights Tonight is the second album released by Richard Thompson, and his first to include his then wife, Linda Thompson, the pair being credited as Richard and Linda Thompson. It was issued by Island Records in the UK in 1974. Although the album did not sell and was critically ignored and not released outside of the UK until 1983, by Hannibal Records, it has been described as "a timeless masterpiece" and considered one of the finest releases by the two singers, whether working singularly or together.

== Background ==
After the marked lack of success achieved by his first album, Henry the Human Fly, British singer-songwriter/guitarist Richard Thompson started a personal and professional relationship with Linda Peters, a session singer. I Want to See the Bright Lights Tonight was the first album by the duo of Richard and Linda Thompson.

Sessions for the album took place at the Sound Techniques studio in Chelsea, London, over a few weeks during spring 1973, with house engineer John Wood co-producing with Thompson. The album, provisionally titled Hokey Pokey, was recorded on a shoestring budget of £2,500; owing to vinyl shortages, it was not released until 1974.

Where his first album was treated harshly by the critics, the second was eventually hailed as a masterpiece. It is now regarded as a classic of English folk rock and one of the Thompsons' finest achievements.

In the sleeve notes for the 2004 CD re-release, David Suff writes: "Throughout the album Richard's sombre, dark songs are driven by his masterful understated guitar and Linda's haunting spiritual vocals. The songs detail a beautiful yet desolate world of life before the fall, the lives of the homeless, the thief and the inebriate. The songs are thoroughly English in their mood and responsibility, wry observations of the hopelessness of the human condition." Considering the song "End of the Rainbow", Suff writes:

Richard denies that the song is totally pessimistic, "there's always hope in the third verse of my songs" yet the overall effect is a magnificent evocation of disillusionment. Thompson's songs are despairing but not self-pitying, leaving the listener with an abiding sense of peace and, paradoxically hope.

== Reception ==
Professional ratings
Review scores
Source	Rating
AllMusic	5/5 stars
Robert Christgau	A−
The Encyclopedia of Popular Music	4/5 stars
Pitchfork	8.5/10
Q	5/5 stars
Rolling Stone	4.5/5 stars
The Rolling Stone Album Guide	4.5/5 stars
Spin Alternative Record Guide	10/10

Initially ignored by reviewers, I Want to See the Bright Lights Tonight later came to be highly regarded. Robert Christgau rated it highly when it was re-released as one-half of Live! (More or Less) noting that "[they] don't sentimentalize about time gone—they simply encompass it in an endless present." When it was re-released in 1984, along with other albums in the Thompsons' catalogue, Kurt Loder writing in Rolling Stone described it as a "timeless masterpiece" with "not a single track that's less than luminous".

More recent reviews are equally complimentary. AllMusic notes that the album is "nothing short of a masterpiece" and calls it "music of striking and unmistakable beauty". Q (May 2007, p. 135): "After his 1971 departure from Fairport Convention, Richard Thompson found his ideal foil in recent bride Linda. A hugely inventive guitarist, he gives full vent to his talent on this dark, brooding album. Indeed, he never quite recaptured the murky demons inside the likes of 'Withered and Died' ever again." In the 2004 CD re-release, Chris Jones at the BBC noted that "Bright Lights...performs the most perfect balancing act between hard-bitten cynicism and honest humanism."

It was voted number 814 in the third edition of Colin Larkin's All Time Top 1000 Albums (2000). In 2003 the album was placed at number 479 on Rolling Stone magazine's list of The 500 Greatest Albums of All Time, and was placed at number 485 in the 2020 edition. The album also appeared in the Mojo "100 Greatest Albums Ever Made".

Writing for Something Else! in 2018, Preston Frazier said, "'The Great Valerio' is just one gem among gems. Richard Thompson's writing is masterful, painting in broad, vivid strokes. Time indeed stands still as Linda Thompson tells the vivid tale, with a hint of detached anxiety... Featuring only Linda's voice and Richard Thompson's Kensington-style picked acoustic, 'The Great Valerio' is dark, yet vivid as it leads the listener to imagine the great fall. Linda Thompson never oversells the proposition, using her voice like the fine instrument it is."

== Track listing ==
All tracks are written by Richard Thompson (except "Together Again" by Buck Owens).

Side one
No.	Title	Lead vocal(s)	Length
1.	"When I Get to the Border"	R. Thompson with Linda Thompson	3:26
2.	"The Calvary Cross"	R. Thompson	3:51
3.	"Withered and Died"	L. Thompson	3:24
4.	"I Want to See the Bright Lights Tonight"	L. Thompson	3:07
5.	"Down Where the Drunkards Roll"	L. Thompson with R. Thompson	4:05

Side two
No.	Title	Lead vocal(s)	Length
6.	"We Sing Hallelujah"	R. Thompson with L. Thompson	2:49
7.	"Has He Got a Friend for Me"	L. Thompson	3:32
8.	"The Little Beggar Girl"	L. Thompson with R. Thompson	3:24
9.	"The End of the Rainbow"	R. Thompson	3:55
10.	"The Great Valerio"	L. Thompson	5:22

2004 CD bonus tracks (previously unreleased)
No.	Title	Length
11.	"I Want to See the Bright Lights Tonight" (live)	3:04
12.	"Together Again" (live)	2:46
13.	"Calvary Cross" (live)	9:54

Bonus tracks were recorded at the Roundhouse, London, on 7 September 1975.

== Personnel ==
=== Musicians ===
- Richard Thompson – guitar, vocals, Hammered dulcimer (10), mandolin (1,8), tin whistle (1,7), piano (2), electric piano (5), harmonium (7)
- Linda Thompson – vocals
- Timi Donald – drums
- Pat Donaldson – bass guitar
- John Kirkpatrick – accordion, concertina (1,3,7,8)
- Simon Nicol – dulcimer (5)
- Brian Gulland – krummhorn (1,6)
- Richard Harvey – krummhorn (1,6)
- Royston Wood – harmony bass vocals (6, 7, possibly 2)
- Trevor Lucas – harmony vocals (5, possibly 2)
- The CWS (Manchester) Silver Band (4)

Bonus tracks: Richard and Linda Thompson with John Kirkpatrick, Dave Pegg (bass guitar) and Dave Mattacks (drums).

=== Technical ===
- John Wood – producer and engineer
- Richard Thompson – producer
- Cover design – unknown

2004 CD re-release:

- Tim Chacksfield – research and project co-ordination
- Joe Black – project co-ordination for Universal
- David Suff – sleeve note and archive assistance
- Phil Smee – CD package design

== Other sources ==
- Humphries, Patrick (1997). Richard Thompson – The Biography. Schirmer Books. ISBN 978-0028647524.
- Smith, Dave. The Great Valerio – A Study of the Songs of Richard Thompson.
- Dimery, Robert; Lydon, Michael (2010). 1001 Albums You Must Hear Before You Die (2nd ed.). Universe Publishing (NY). ISBN 978-0789320742.
