= Hokey Pokey (album) =

Studio album by Richard and Linda Thompson
- Released: April 1975
- Recorded: September – October 1974
- Studios: Sound Techniques, London
- Genre: Folk rock
- Length: 36:02 (original); 52:36 (2004 reissue)
- Label: Island
- Producers: Richard Thompson and Simon Nicol

Richard and Linda Thompson chronology
I Want to See the Bright Lights Tonight (1974)	Hokey Pokey (1975)	Pour Down Like Silver (1975)

Singles from Hokey Pokey
- 1. "Hokey Pokey (The Ice Cream Man)" Released: February 1975

Professional ratings
Review scores
Source	Rating
AllMusic	4/5 stars
Christgau's Record Guide	A
The Encyclopedia of Popular Music	4/5 stars

Hokey Pokey is the second album by the British duo of singer Linda Thompson and singer/songwriter/guitarist Richard Thompson. It was recorded in the autumn of 1974 and released in the year 1975.

Much of the material on the Hokey Pokey album was written sometime before the album was recorded and even predates the Thompsons' conversion to Islam.

In terms of musical style Thompson's songwriting on this album reflects a number of British styles despite not being in the English folk-rock style of "Bright Lights": Music Hall, English hymns, traditional brass bands, pub sing-alongs and even the double entendres of George Formby are all discernible. In many cases, Thompson juxtaposes an upbeat tune with a bleak lyric.

It was voted number 604 in the third edition of Colin Larkin's All Time Top 1000 Albums (2000).

== Track listing ==
All songs written by Richard Thompson except where noted.

Side one

1. "Hokey Pokey (The Ice Cream Song)" – 3:20
2. "I'll Regret It All in the Morning" – 3:31
3. "Smiffy's Glass Eye" – 2:51
4. "The Egypt Room" – 3:52
5. "Never Again" – 3:05

Side two

1. "Georgie on a Spree" – 3:36
2. "Old Man Inside a Young Man" – 4:25
3. "The Sun Never Shines on the Poor" – 3:38
4. "A Heart Needs a Home" – 2:30
5. "Mole in a Hole" (Mike Waterson) – 3:22

2004 Island CD reissue

11. "Wishing" (Buddy Holly, Bobby Montgomery) (live)
12. "I'm Turning Off a Memory" (Merle Haggard) (live)
13. "A Heart Needs a Home" (live)
14. "Hokey Pokey (The Ice Cream Song)" (live)
15. "It'll Be Me" (Jack Clement) (live)

== Personnel ==
- Richard Thompson - guitar, vocals, mandolin (3,10), hammered dulcimer (4,5), Electric dulcimer (5,9), piano
- Linda Thompson - vocals
- Timi Donald - drums
- Pat Donaldson - bass guitar
- Simon Nicol - guitar, piano, Hammond organ (8), vocals (7)
- John Kirkpatrick - accordion (1,3,4,10)
- Ian Whiteman - piano, calliope (9)
- Sidonie Goossens - harp (9)
- Aly Bain - fiddle (1,3)
- The CWS Silver Band (6,10)
