= Henry the Human Fly =

Studio album by Richard Thompson
- Released: April 1972
- Recorded: February 1972
- Studio: Sound Techniques, London
- Genre: Folk rock
- Length: 37:01
- Label: Island; Reprise; Hannibal; Fledg'ling
- Producer: Richard Thompson, John Wood

Richard Thompson chronology
Henry the Human Fly (1972)	I Want to See the Bright Lights Tonight (1974)

Henry the Human Fly is the debut solo album by Richard Thompson, his first release following his leaving former group Fairport Convention. It was released on the Island label in the U.K. and the Reprise label in the U.S.A. in April 1972. The album was reissued by Rykodisc in 1991.

Thompson has stated that at one point this was the worst-selling album in the Warner Bros. catalog.

== Production ==
Although Thompson's first solo album, two other ex-Fairport Convention members (Sandy Denny and Ashley Hutchings) make appearances. Linda Peters, who married Thompson shortly after the album was released, sings backup on Henry the Human Fly.

== Critical reception ==
Professional ratings
Review scores
Source	Rating
AllMusic	4.5/5 stars
Christgau's Record Guide	A−
The Encyclopedia of Popular Music	3/5 stars
MusicHound Rock: The Essential Album Guide	3.5/5 stars
Rolling Stone	4/5 stars
The Rolling Stone Album Guide	3/5 stars
Spin Alternative Record Guide	9/10

The Spin Alternative Record Guide called the songs "tinged with perversity and populated by oddballs," writing that it "reveals Thompson as the one Fairporter most fiercely determined to redefine folk rock at every turn."

Mojo counted Henry the Human Fly as one of the hundred greatest guitar albums ever produced.

== Track listing ==
All songs written by Richard Thompson.

1. "Roll Over Vaughn Williams" – 4:09
2. "Nobody’s Wedding" – 3:13
3. "The Poor Ditching Boy" – 3:01
4. "Shaky Nancy" – 3:26
5. "The Angels Took My Racehorse Away" – 4:01
6. "Wheely Down" – 3:00
7. "The New St. George" – 2:08
8. "Painted Ladies" – 3:31
9. "Cold Feet" – 2:26
10. "Mary and Joseph" – 1:38
11. "The Old Changing Way" – 3:55
12. "Twisted" – 1:58

== Personnel ==
- Richard Thompson – guitar, vocals, accordion (1), tin whistle (4), mandolin (12)
- Timi Donald – drums, vocals
- Pat Donaldson – bass guitar, vocals
- David Snell – harp (11,12)
- Jeff Cole – trombone (7,10)
- John Defereri – tenor saxophone (7,10)
- Clay Toyani – trumpet (7,10)
- Sue Draheim – fiddle (2,7)
- Barry Dransfield – fiddle (3,5,6)
- John Kirkpatrick – accordion (2,5)
- Andy Roberts – Appalachian dulcimer (3)
- Sandy Denny – piano (8), vocals (4,5)
- Linda Peters – vocals (4,5)
- Ashley Hutchings – vocals
- uncredited – harmonium (6,9,10), piano (6)
