= John Kirkpatrick (folk musician) =

English folk musician (born 1947

John Kirkpatrick MBE
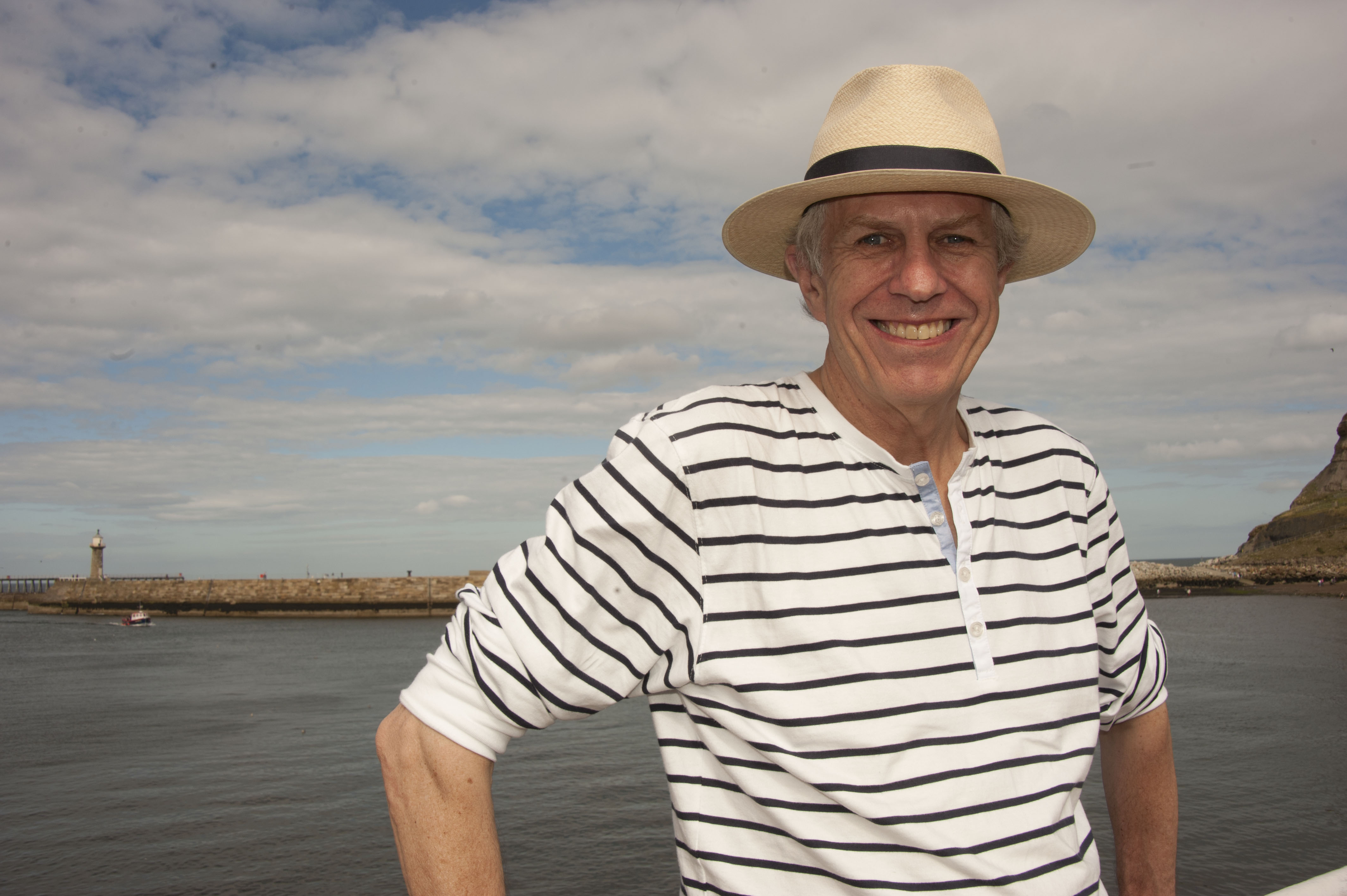
- Kirkpatrick in 2011

Background information
- Born: John Michael Kirkpatrick; 8 August 1947 (age 79)
- Origin: Chiswick, London, England
- Genre: Folk
- Occupation: Musician
- Instruments: Button accordion; Anglo concertina; melodeon; vocals
- Years active: 1959–present
- Member of: Brass Monkey
- Formerly of: Steeleye Span; Albion Band
- Spouse: Sue Harris (1973 – ?)

John Michael Kirkpatrick MBE (born 8 August 1947) is an English musician, playing free reed instruments such as the button accordion and Anglo concertina, and performing English folk songs and tunes.

== In London ==
John Kirkpatrick was born in Chiswick, London, England. As a child he sang in the choir and played piano. In 1959, he joined the Hammersmith Morris Men, in the second week of their existence, beginning a career-long love of folk music. In 1970, he became a regular at a folk club in the Roebuck pub in Tottenham Court Road and led the resident group, Dingle's Chillybom Band. The club hosted a film show of Morris dancing and Ashley Hutchings turned up. It was the beginning of a long musical relationship. In 1972 he teamed up with Ashley and others on the album Morris On. In 1972, Kirkpatrick recorded his first solo album Jump at the Sun which included Richard Thompson on acoustic guitar (under the pseudonym "Agnes Mirren") and also Ashley Hutchings (as "Humphray de Etchyngham"); among the other backing musicians was future wife Sue Harris on recorder, oboe, and background vocals.

== In Shropshire ==
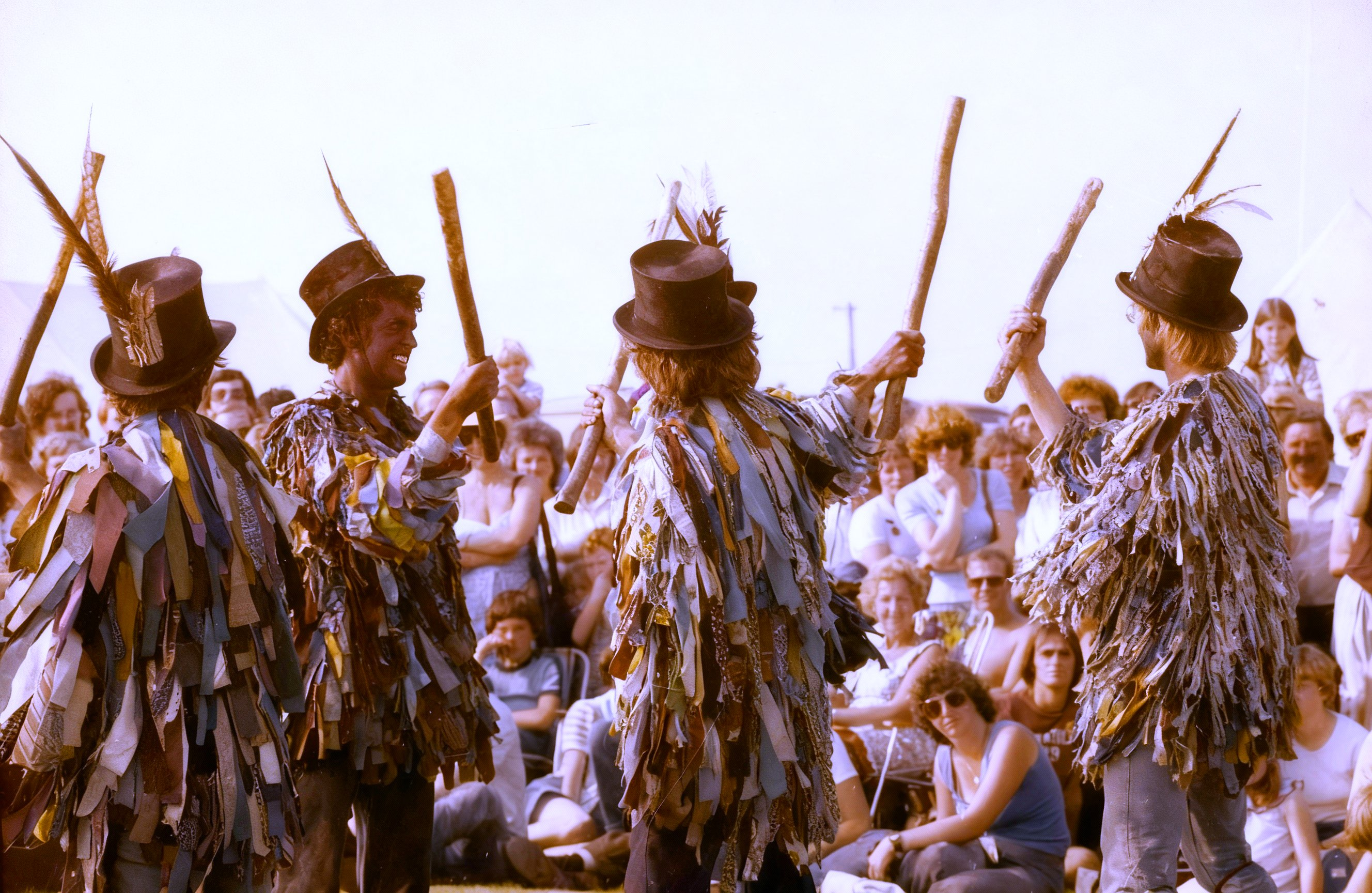
The Shropshire Bedlams, including Kirkpatrick (second from left), performing at Towersey in 1980

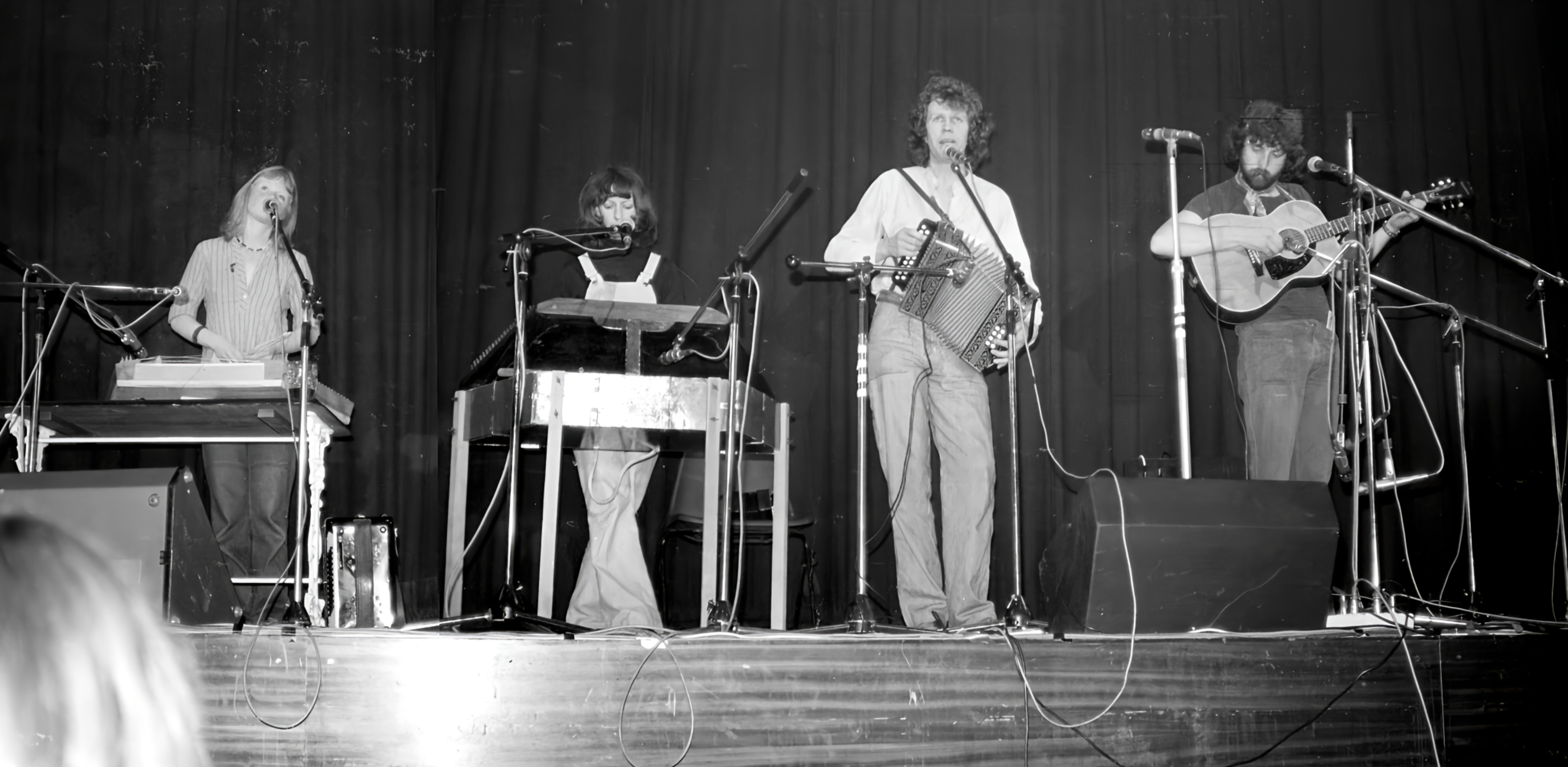
John Kirkpatrick (second from right) performing with Sue Harris (=Sue Kirkpatrick) (left), Geoff Harris (right) and Pennie Harris (second from left) at the 1977 Norwich Folk Festival

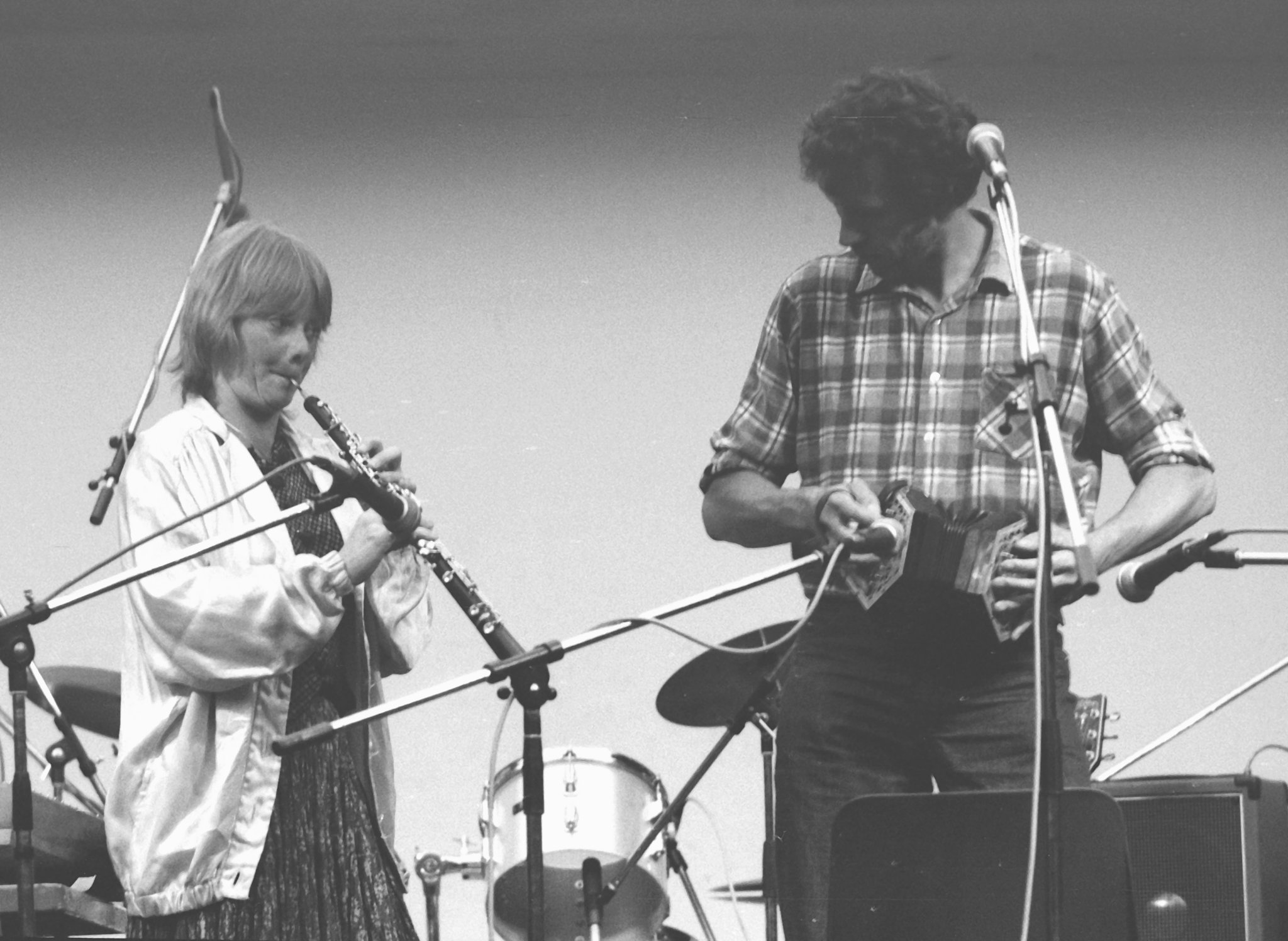
John Kirkpatrick (R) and Sue Harris (L), Greenwich, 1982

In 1973, Kirkpatrick married Sue Harris. They moved first to Wolverhampton then to Aston on Clun in Shropshire. After seeing a dance team called Gloucestershire Old Spot Morris Dancers, he formed Shropshire Bedlams to perform local dances in the Border Morris style. In the early weeks some girls turned up and rather than have a mixed morris team, Harris took the girls aside to form Martha Rhoden's Tuppenny Dish; both teams are still flourishing and celebrated their fortieth anniversary in 2015. By this time Kirkpatrick was an expert player of melodeon, Anglo concertina, and button accordion. Ashley Hutchings' project Battle of the Field floundered when the Albion Country Band broke up. They had recorded not quite enough material for an album. Kirkpatrick and Harris had appeared on the 1973 recording sessions as band members with Martin Carthy and others, and later, with Dave Mattacks on percussion, the duo recorded an extra track in 1976, "Reaphook and Sickle" which was included on the album as eventually released. Harris sang and played oboe and hammered dulcimer, an unusual combination. In 1974, Kirkpatrick and Hutchings produced a themed album The Compleat Dancing Master, a history of English country dancing. In 1976, he teamed up with Carthy for Plain Capers, a collection of morris dance tunes.

In 2009, he appeared in the BBC series, Victorian Farm, which was set in Acton Scott in Shropshire, performing traditional country songs such as "The Farmer's Boy".

== Steeleye Span ==
In 1977, Steeleye Span recruited both Kirkpatrick and Carthy, partly to replace fiddler Peter Knight. Kirkpatrick appearing on the albums Storm Force Ten and Live at Last; in concert with them, he would perform solo morris dances. In the same period, Kirkpatrick released two albums as a duo with Sue Harris. He became part of Richard Thompson's backing band in 1975. This brought him such publicity that he was in heavy demand as a session musician. He recorded with Pere Ubu, Viv Stanshall, Jack the Lad, Gerry Rafferty, Maddy Prior and others. In 1980 he released his only single, "Jogging Along with My Reindeer". Two more albums with Sue Harris appeared in 1981, but the constant touring, as a duo and as part of other groups, was putting a strain on the marriage. They had four sons together, but parted in the mid-1980s. In 1988, he and Sue published Opus Pocus, a collection of many of their own compositions from the previous 20 years, and a selection of some of the (then) more obscure traditional English tunes which had influenced them.

== Brass Monkey ==
In 1979, Kirkpatrick had appeared in the National Theatre Company's stage show Lark Rise to Candleford together with Carthy and trumpeter Howard Evans. Prior to this the use of brass instruments in English folk music was a rare event, but all three had found it thrilling and a couple of years later formed Brass Monkey with Martin Brinsford from the Old Swan Band. The group is an occasional gathering rather than a fixed company. Roy Bailey, like Leon Rosselson has frequently recorded songs of social commentary, frequently on an anti-war theme. He has made several records with Roy Bailey, as well as in a group called Band of Hope. He recorded with Frankie Armstrong in 1996 and 1997. They share a love of early English ballads. He performed with accordion wizard Chris Parkinson as the Sultans of Squeeze, and the pair have released one album.

== John Kirkpatrick Band ==
In 1997, he decided to front his own "rock-folk" band, and put together a line-up consisting of Graeme Taylor (guitar, electric guitar, banjo, mandolin – ex Gryphon, The Albion Band and Home Service), Mike Gregory (drums, percussion – ex Albion Band, Home Service), Dave Berry (electric bass, double bass, tuba) and Paul Burgess (fiddle, recorders – from the Old Swan Band). They made two albums: a live album "Force of Habit" containing many of Kirkpatrick's arrangements of Morris tunes, plus other material from his back catalogue, plus a studio album "Welcome To Hell" featuring new material.

== As soloist ==
Since 1993, Kirkpatrick has recorded seven solo albums. He often unearths obscure English tunes and songs from folk ceremonies. Recently he has started to explore Balkan and Hungarian dance tunes. He has produced one of the only teaching videos for English (D/G) melodeon, also on DVD. A further teaching resource is his 2003 book of traditional tunes, English Choice, and two accompanying CDs.

== Personal life ==
He is remarried, having previously been married to Sue Harris from 1973. One of his sons, Benji Kirkpatrick, is a member of Faustus, a former member of Bellowhead and Magpie Lane, and has recorded as a solo guitarist. He has succeeded his father as a member of Steeleye Span. All four of his sons do morris dancing. As a composer, choreographer and musical director, Kirkpatrick has contributed to over 60 plays in the theatre and on radio.

Kirkpatrick was appointed Member of the Order of the British Empire (MBE) in the 2021 New Year Honours for services to folk music.

== Discography ==
Solo albums

- Jump at the Sun (1972)
- Going Spare (1978)
- Three in a Row (1983)
- Blue Balloon (1987)
- Sheepskins (1988)
- Earthling (1994)
- One Man and His Box (1999)
- Mazurka Berzerker (2001)
- The Duck Race (2004)
- A Short History of John Kirkpatrick (anthology) (1994)
- Make No Bones (2 CDs) (2007)
- Dance of the Demon Daffodils (2009)
- God Speed the Plough (2011)
- Every Mortal Place (2013)
- Tunes from the Trenches (2015)
- Coat-Tails Flying (2017)

John Kirkpatrick and Sue Harris

- The Rose of Britain's Isle (1974)
- Among The Many Attractions at the Show will be a Really High Class Band (1976)
- Shreds and Patches (1977)
- Facing the Music (1980)
- Ballad of the Black Country (1981)
- Stolen Ground (1989)

Ashley Hutchings with John Kirkpatrick

- Morris On (1972)
- The Compleat Dancing Master (1974)

John Kirkpatrick and Martin Carthy

- Plain Capers (1976)

With the Albion Band

- Battle of the Field (1976)
- Lark Rise To Candleford (1980)
- The BBC Sessions (1998) (tracks 1 – 4, recorded 1973)

With John Raven and Sue Harris

- The English Canals (1975) [reissued in 1999 as The Bold Navigators – The Story of England's Canals in Song]

With Steeleye Span

- Storm Force Ten (1977)
- Live at Last! (1978)

With Brass Monkey

- Brass Monkey (1983)
- See How it Runs (1986)
- Sound and Rumour (1999)
- Going And Staying (2001)
- Flame of Fire (2004)
- The Complete Brass Monkey (anthology)

John Kirkpatrick Band

- Force of Habit (1997)
- Welcome To Hell (1997)

With Umps and Dumps

- The Moon's in a Fit (1980)

John Kirkpatrick, Maddy Prior and Sydney Carter

- Lovely in the Dances: Songs of Sydney Carter (1981)

Kepa Junkera, Riccardo Tesi, John Kirkpatrick

- Trans-Europe Diatonique (1993)

John Kirkpatrick, Rosie Cross, Georgina Le Faux, Michael Gregory, Jane Threlfall, Carl Hogsden

- Wassail! (1997)

Maddy Prior, John Kirkpatrick, Frankie Armstrong, Nic Jones, Gordeanna McCulloch

- Ballads (1997)

John Kirkpatrick and Chris Parkinson

- Sultans of Squeeze (2005)

As session musician

- Henry the Human Fly (Richard Thompson) (1972)
- I Want to See the Bright Lights Tonight (Richard and Linda Thompson) (1974)
- Hokey Pokey (Richard and Linda Thompson) (1975)
- Pour Down Like Silver (Richard and Linda Thompson) (1975)
- First Light (Richard and Linda Thompson) (1977)
- Sunnyvista (Richard and Linda Thompson) (1979)
- Night Owl (Gerry Rafferty) (1979)
- My Very Favourite Nursery Rhymes (Tim Hart and Friends) (1981)
- Hand of Kindness (Richard Thompson) (1983)
- Daring Adventures (Richard Thompson) (1986)
- The Crab Wars: A Ballad of the Olden Times, As Remembered by Sid and Henry Kipper (The Kipper Family) (1986)
- Amnesia (Richard Thompson) (1988)
- Why Does It Have To Be Me? (Roy Bailey) (1989)
- Sweet Talker (Richard Thompson) (1991)
- Rumor and Sigh (Richard Thompson) (1991)
- The Happiness Counter (Leon Rosselson) (1992)
- Mirror Blue (Richard Thompson) (1994)
- More Guitar (Richard Thompson) (2003)
- Boomerang (Benji Kirkpatrick) (2007)

Original film soundtrack

- Rêve de Siam (with Dan Ar Braz) (1992)

Compilation albums

- The Rough Guide to English Roots Music (1998, World Music Network)
- Three Score and Ten (2009, Topic)

The tracks Kirkpatrick performs on in the Three Score and Ten boxed set are "The Rose Of Britain's Isle" / "Glorishears" from the Rose Of Britain's Isle; "The Maid and the Palmer" as part of Brass Monkey; and "George's Son" featuring Brass Monkey from See How it Runs.
