= Semi-Detached Mock Tudor =

Live album by Richard Thompson
- Released: 2002
- Recorded: November 1999 in America
- Genre: Rock
- Length: 75:53
- Label: Beeswing
- Producer: Tom Dube

Richard Thompson chronology
Action Packed (2001)	Semi-Detached Mock Tudor (2002)	The Old Kit Bag (2003)

Professional ratings
Review scores
Source	Rating
AllMusic	4/5 stars
Encyclopedia of Popular Music	3/5 stars

Semi-Detached Mock Tudor is a live album by Richard Thompson

Beginning with the Live at Crawley album in 1995, Richard Thompson had begun issuing high-quality, officially sanctioned live recordings as an alternative to bootleg recordings—products that would provide the artist with revenue and offer better quality to the fans.

Semi-Detached Mock Tudor was recorded on tour to promote Thompson's 1999 album Mock Tudor, and was released in 2002. It was the first release on his own Beeswing label. Thompson has since released several more live albums on this label and marketed them at concerts and via his web site which was launched simultaneously with Semi-Detached Mock Tudor. Many fans consider the performances on Semi-Detached Mock Tudor to be preferable to the "official album".

Thompson toured heavily to support and promote what he considered to be a strong album and eight of Semi-Detached Mock Tudor’s 13 tracks are from the then-current Mock Tudor - including Mock Tudor’s opening five-song sequence with which Thompson and his band opened every concert of the 1999 tour.

== Track listing ==
All songs written by Richard Thompson

1. "Cooksferry Queen"
2. "Sibella"
3. "Bathsheba Smiles"
4. "Two-Faced Love"
5. "Hard On Me"
6. "Jennie"
7. "She Twists The Knife Again"
8. "Uninhabited Man"
9. "Walking The Long Miles Home"
10. "When The Spell Is Broken"
11. "Crawl Back (Under My Stone)"
12. "A Man In Need"
13. "Razor Dance"

== Personnel ==
- Richard Thompson - electric guitar, acoustic guitar and vocals
- Pete Zorn - mandolin, penny whistle, baritone saxophone, acoustic guitar, percussion, bass flute and backing vocals
- Teddy Thompson - electric guitar, acoustic guitar, dulcimer and backing vocals
- Danny Thompson - double bass
- Michael Jerome - drums

Cover Photograph © Bob Battersby/Lodestone Publishing Limited
