= Two Letter Words =

Live album by Richard Thompson
- Released: 1996
- Recorded: April and May 1994 in America
- Genre: Rock
- Length: 1:59:02
- Label: Flypaper
- Producer: Tom Dube

Richard Thompson chronology
You? Me? Us? (1996)	Two Letter Words (1996)	Celtschmerz (1998)

Professional ratings
Review scores
Source	Rating
AllMusic	3/5 stars
Encyclopedia of Popular Music	3/5 stars

Two Letter Words is a live album by Richard Thompson.

Continuing his policy, begun with the Live at Crawley album, of releasing high quality alternatives to bootlegs, Richard Thompson released this album in 1996. The album was recorded during his 1994 tour of America.

The 1994 tour marked the debut of a new look, smaller live band for Thompson with multi-instrumentalist Pete Zorn and the rhythm section of Dave Mattacks and Danny Thompson (no relation) providing the backing. The 1994 band was the blueprint for future touring Thompson bands.

Two Letter Words is highly regarded by Thompson fans. It includes eight tracks from the then newly released Mirror Blue, and thus serves as an interesting contrast with the original album's controversial production.

Two Letter Words was initially released under a deal with Capitol Records, Thompson's label at the time, which permitted him to supplement his income with albums not recorded in the studio provided that they were not made available in retail outlets and were pressed in limited quantities. In 2009 it was re-released as a digital download available via Thompson's website. As of August 2020, it is still available from this source, and can be found on a variety of download and streaming services.

== Track listing ==
All songs written by Richard Thompson except where otherwise indicated.

Disc 1

1. "I Ride In Your Slipstream"
2. "From Galway To Graceland"
3. "Easy There, Steady Now"
4. "Waltzing's For Dreamers"
5. "I Can't Wake Up To Save My Life"
6. "MGB-GT"
7. "The Way That It Shows"
8. "Al Bowlly's In Heaven"
9. "Now Be Thankful" (Dave Swarbrick / Richard Thompson)
10. "Mascara Tears"
11. "Tear Stained Letter"

Disc 2

1. "Dimming Of The Day"
2. "1952 Vincent Black Lightning"
3. "Beeswing"
4. "Mingus Eyes"
5. "Killerman Gold Posse"
6. "Shoot Out The Lights"
7. "Valerie"
8. "Wall Of Death"
9. "I Feel So Good"
10. "Hokey Pokey"
11. "Ghosts In The Wind"
12. "Back Street Slide"
13. "Read About Love"

== Personnel ==
- Richard Thompson – guitar, vocals
- Pete Zorn – mandolin, pennywhistle, alto saxophone, soprano saxophone, backing vocals, acoustic guitar
- Danny Thompson – double bass
- Dave Mattacks – drums

== Other sources ==
- Richard Thompson – The Biography by Patrick Humprhies. Schirmer Books. 0-02-864752-1
