= Celtschmerz =

Live album by Richard Thompson
- Released: 1998
- Recorded: January 1998, UK
- Genre: Rock
- Length: 65:00
- Label: Flypaper
- Producer: Tom Dube

Richard Thompson chronology
Two Letter Words (1996)	Celtschmerz (1998)	Mock Tudor (1999)

Professional ratings
Review scores
Source	Rating
AllMusic	4/5 stars

Celtschmerz is a live album by Richard Thompson.

Continuing his policy, begun with the Live at Crawley album, of releasing high quality alternatives to bootlegs, Thompson released this live album in 1998. The album was recorded during his tour of England earlier the same year.

Starting in the early 1980s Thompson began to perform live solo and with an acoustic guitar. By the late 1990s he was performing more frequently in this format than with a band. Celtschmerz captures him in this "unplugged" setting. Comparing Celtschmerz to 1984's Small Town Romance shows how Thompson has evolved his solo acoustic guitar technique over the years.

Thompson's son Teddy was the support act on this tour and joined his father each night to perform some duets. Several of these are included on Celtschmerz - most notably "A Heart Needs A Home", which is associated with Teddy's mother Linda Thompson, and "Persuasion" which was co-written with Tim Finn.

== Track listing ==
All songs written by Richard Thompson except where noted

1. "Turning Of The Tide"
2. "How Will I Ever Be Simple Again"
3. "Why Must I Plead"
4. "The Poor Ditching Boy"
5. "When The Spell Is Broken"
6. "Last Shift"
7. "Pharaoh"
8. "Keep Your Distance"
9. "Walking On A Wire"
10. "A Heart Needs A Home"
11. "She May Call You Up Tonight" (Steve Martin-Caro, Michael Brown)
12. "Persuasion" (Richard Thompson, Tim Finn)
13. "Razor Dance"
14. "Beat the Retreat"
15. "Wall Of Death"
16. "Tear Stained Letter"

== Personnel ==
- Richard Thompson - guitar, vocals
- Teddy Thompson - guitar, vocals on tracks 10, 11, 12, 13, 15 and 16
- Danny Thompson - double bass on track 16
- Dave Mattacks - snare drum and hi-hat on track 12

== See also ==
- Weltschmerz
