= The Book of Nora =

- The Leftovers episode
- Carrie Coon's monologue in the final scene received massive critical acclaim.
- Episode no.: Season 3 Episode 8
- Directed by: Mimi Leder
- Story by: Tom Spezialy; Damon Lindelof
- Teleplay by: Tom Perrotta; Damon Lindelof
- Production code: T13.20208
- Original air date: June 4, 2017
- Running time: 72 minutes

Guest appearances
- Katja Herbers as Dr. Eden; Victoria Haralabidou as Dr. Bekker; Linda Cropper as the Nun; Alison Bell as Aggie; Damian Hill as Eddie

Episode chronology
← Previous "The Most Powerful Man in the World (and His Identical Twin Brother)"	Next → —

"The Book of Nora" is the series finale of the HBO drama television series The Leftovers. It is the eighth episode of the series' third season, and the 28th overall. The episode's script was written by series showrunners Damon Lindelof and Tom Perrotta, based on a story from Lindelof and Tom Spezialy, and directed by Mimi Leder. It aired in the United States on June 4, 2017.

The episode follows Nora Durst in her decision to enter an experimental machine purported to reunite its subjects with those who vanished in the "Sudden Departure."

"The Book of Nora" received unanimous acclaim from critics, who praised Carrie Coon's central performance, Leder's direction, and the emotionally and thematically resonant conclusion of the series. Many critics called it one of the greatest series finales of all time.

== Plot ==
Nora gives a recorded testimonial consenting to be part of Dr. Eden and Dr. Bekker's experiment to replicate the Departure, having tracked down the scientists and forced them to accept her as a test subject after previously being rejected. Afterwards, she and Matt reminisce on their orphaned childhood; Matt confides his anxieties surrounding his cancer treatment, stating that he is equally afraid of death as he is of surviving without having answers to provide for those seeking his moral counsel.

After bidding farewell to her brother, Nora is briefed on the details of the experimental procedure by Dr. Eden, and agrees to go through with the test. She disrobes and enters a truck housing the device, experiencing memories of the moments leading up to her family's departure. She enters the machine's event chamber, where she is slowly submerged in a metallic fluid.

The episode cuts to a farmhouse in rural Australia years later, where an older Nora (going by the name "Sarah") lives by herself. She spends her days tending to birds that carry handwritten messages from the surrounding town back to the farm, and delivering them to a nun at a nearby church. During one of Nora's trips, the nun informs her that a man named Kevin visited the church with Nora's picture inquiring about her whereabouts. Nora claims not to know anyone named Kevin, and rides back home on her bike.

Nora soon receives a knock on her door and finds that it is an older Kevin Garvey. Kevin claims that the only time he has met Nora was during the Christmas dance in Mapleton, and that he simply spotted and recognized her while vacationing in Australia. He invites her to a local dance happening that night, but an uncomfortable Nora asks him to leave. Panicked, Nora bikes to a nearby phone booth and calls Laurie - who is still her therapist - and demands to know whether she disclosed Nora's location to Kevin. Laurie denies having done so, but suggests that Nora is only calling to clear her conscience about going to the dance with Kevin.

That night, Nora ultimately decides to attend the dance. Upon arriving, she discovers that the event is in fact a wedding between two locals that Kevin befriended. Kevin continues behaving as if he does not remember any of his history with Nora since their first encounter. Nora learns from Kevin that Matt has died of cancer after reconciling with Mary; Jill is now in a happy marriage and bears an infant daughter, while Tommy's marriage was unsuccessful; and Kevin Sr. is still alive at the age of 91. Kevin additionally informs Nora that he had a pacemaker implanted after suffering a heart attack. The bride and groom place beaded necklaces around the neck of a scapegoat and release it into the wild. Nora and Kevin dance together and embrace, but Nora abruptly leaves when Kevin maintains his story, believing their reunion to be insincere.

Nora returns home to find that her birds - who were released at the wedding carrying messages from the guests intended for their loved ones - have not returned to the farmhouse. She rides to the church to confront the nun, and accuses her of lying to the locals that the birds are transporting "messages of love" around the world. The nun claims that she is not deceiving anyone, but simply offering "a nicer story." Nora accuses the nun of having had sex with a man who had climbed out of the convent's window. While riding home, Nora finds the goat released into the wilderness by the wedding guests entangled in a barbed-wire fence. Nora rescues the goat, places the beads around her own neck, and brings it home with her as dawn begins to break.

While feeding the goat, Nora sees Kevin arrive at her house. Kevin confesses that he has spent his vacation time over the last several years relentlessly searching for Nora in Australia, refusing to believe that she was truly gone. He admits that his ruse of behaving like a stranger was simply an ill-conceived attempt to erase the mistakes that led to the dissolution of their relationship.

Nora invites Kevin inside for tea, where he tells her he is still the chief of police in Jarden, and that John and Laurie still live next door. Nora explains to Kevin that she did not back out of the experiment; rather, she was transported to an alternate reality populated by the departed 2 percent, and in that world, it was the other 98 percent that had disappeared. Nora claims that she found her family living happily in this alternate world (as they were unusually fortunate to have kept most of their family, contrasting Nora's unique misfortune), which convinced her that she had no place being with them again. She says she decided instead to track down the inventor of Eden and Bekker's machine and had him build a replica that returned her to her original reality. Nora says she longed to contact Kevin, but feared that he would not believe her. Kevin says that he does indeed believe her, as her mere presence before him attests to the truth of her story. The two join hands, happily reunited, while Nora's birds finally return home outside.

== Production ==
=== Writing ===
Showrunner Damon Lindelof and the writers began planning the series finale in January 2016, a month after The Leftovers was renewed for its third and final season. It was decided early on that the final episode would be centered on the character of Nora Durst, as Lindelof believed that giving Nora closure on her grief "felt like a perfect conclusion to the entire opus." Additionally, Lindelof decided to intertwine Nora's resolution with an idea he had formulated during production of the pilot episode, in which the two percent of the human population who vanished in the Sudden Departure were in fact transported to an alternate reality where the other 98 percent disappeared. Series co-creator Tom Perrotta, who authored the novel upon which the series is based, was staunchly opposed to depicting this "Other Place" onscreen, maintaining that the Departure should remain fundamentally ambiguous; writer Patrick Somerville proposed a compromise in which Nora simply describes the fate of the departed population to another character over a cup of tea. The writing process for the remainder of the third season became anchored to this idea, labeled in the writers' room as "Nora makes tea."

The decision to set the finale ten years ahead of the series' main events was inspired by the Great Disappointment of 1844, which was used as a prominent metaphor for the third season and depicted onscreen in the opening scene of the premiere episode, "The Book of Kevin." Lindelof explained: "if we resolve [the idea the world might be ending] in the penultimate episode, the audience will have a full week to deal with the idea that we still have more show. And what we are really interested in — the 'now what?' of it all. What generates apocalyptic thinking is that you don't have to deal with the future." In deciding how to reunite Kevin and Nora after the time jump, Somerville, seeking an "organic stall that thematically made sense," proposed that Kevin reintroduce himself to Nora under a false identity; Lindelof modified the idea so that Kevin would pretend not to remember their time together. Lindelof and writer Tom Spezialy both felt that Kevin's unnatural behavior would provide an appropriate counterpoint to Nora's pragmatism, and lend a "rom-com" air to their reunion. Writer Nick Cuse took inspiration from the 2009 film Up in the Air in suggesting that Kevin and Nora attend a wedding, believing other people's weddings to be "effective at surfacing buried emotions" for attending couples.

==== Ending ====
In the final scene of the episode, Nora explains to Kevin that the scientists' machine transported her to an alternate reality populated only by the departed individuals, and that she returned to the real world after seeing her family living happily. Lindelof and the writers were particularly insistent on maintaining ambiguity over whether Nora's story is true, which informed the decision not to show onscreen flashbacks of her journey. Lindelof explained: "This entire series and particularly this season has been about incredible actors telling incredible stories that are very least true to them. (...) Whether or not they're actually true to anyone else is all a matter of belief, and belief is an incredibly powerful aspect that the show has been playing with since it began." However, Lindelof did confirm that the writers had privately reached a verdict on the veracity of Nora's story, which he plans not to reveal in order to preserve the series' thematic coherence. He elaborated: "We have a unanimous feeling as to which one of those realities is real and we will never, ever, say, 'This is what really happened.' (...) Kevin believes, or says he believes, the story; that's the whole point of the series. That's what religion is."

Actress Carrie Coon felt that Nora's story would register similarly regardless of the truth of her account, noting that she considered both outcomes. She elaborated:

...the human capacity for self-delusion is very strong. And so regardless of whether the experience is true or not true, the brain believed what it believes. If you tell a lie enough times, you start to believe it. For me, I felt that no matter what I chose, it wouldn't matter. It would play the same.

During the scene, Nora mentions to Kevin that the LADR machine was originally invented by a physicist named Dr. Van Eeghen; the name is a reference to Henk Van Eeghen, who served as an editor on the third season.

=== Filming ===
"The Book of Nora" was directed by Mimi Leder, a veteran director and executive producer for the series who played an influential role in its shift in creative direction that began in the second season. The episode was largely filmed in the town of Clunes, Victoria, whose geographic characteristics inspired certain details in the episode's script such as Nora's use of pigeons to receive handwritten messages from around the town. The crew brought in a live goat as part of the wedding scene, in which the guests unburden themselves of their sins by adorning the goat with beaded necklaces before releasing it into the wild.

Leder filmed Kevin and Nora's third and final encounter in the episode in reverse order, with their conversation over tea followed by Kevin's outburst and confession, in order to capitalize on weather conditions and minimize makeup preparation. To portray an aged Kevin and Nora, makeup artist Angela Conte avoided using prosthetics, instructed by Lindelof not to create "old-age makeup", and instead applied a light latex stipple onto the faces of actors Justin Theroux and Carrie Coon that she molded to simulate wrinkles, lost skin elasticity, and aging spots. Coon's gray-haired wig was hand-stitched by a London-based tailor and cost $10,000 to produce.

The final scene shot for the series was Nora's entry into the LADR machine, whose design was derived from images of antique fusion reactors as well as the Large Hadron Collider. Paino and the production design crew consulted physicists on how to authentically design the device, and equipped the acrylic event chamber with a functional hatch and water jets. The machine set cost $100,000 to construct, making the scene one of the series' most expensive. The scene, which depicts a fully nude Nora, was filmed behind a closed set on a soundstage in Melbourne that was superheated to ensure Coon's comfort. Leder, Coon and Lindelof experimented with various iterations of the scene's ending, ultimately deciding that Nora should ambiguously scream out at the last second before the episode cuts away to the farmhouse. Lindelof and Spezialy contributed significantly to the editing process for the scene, swapping out a traditional musical score for archival audio and footage from the departure of Nora's family

The episode's title sequence reuses "Let the Mystery Be" by Iris DeMent, which served as the opening theme for the entirety of the second season.

== Reception ==
=== Ratings ===
Upon airing, the episode was watched by 1.049 million viewers with an 18-49 rating of 0.4, making it the most-watched episode of the third season.

=== Critical reception ===
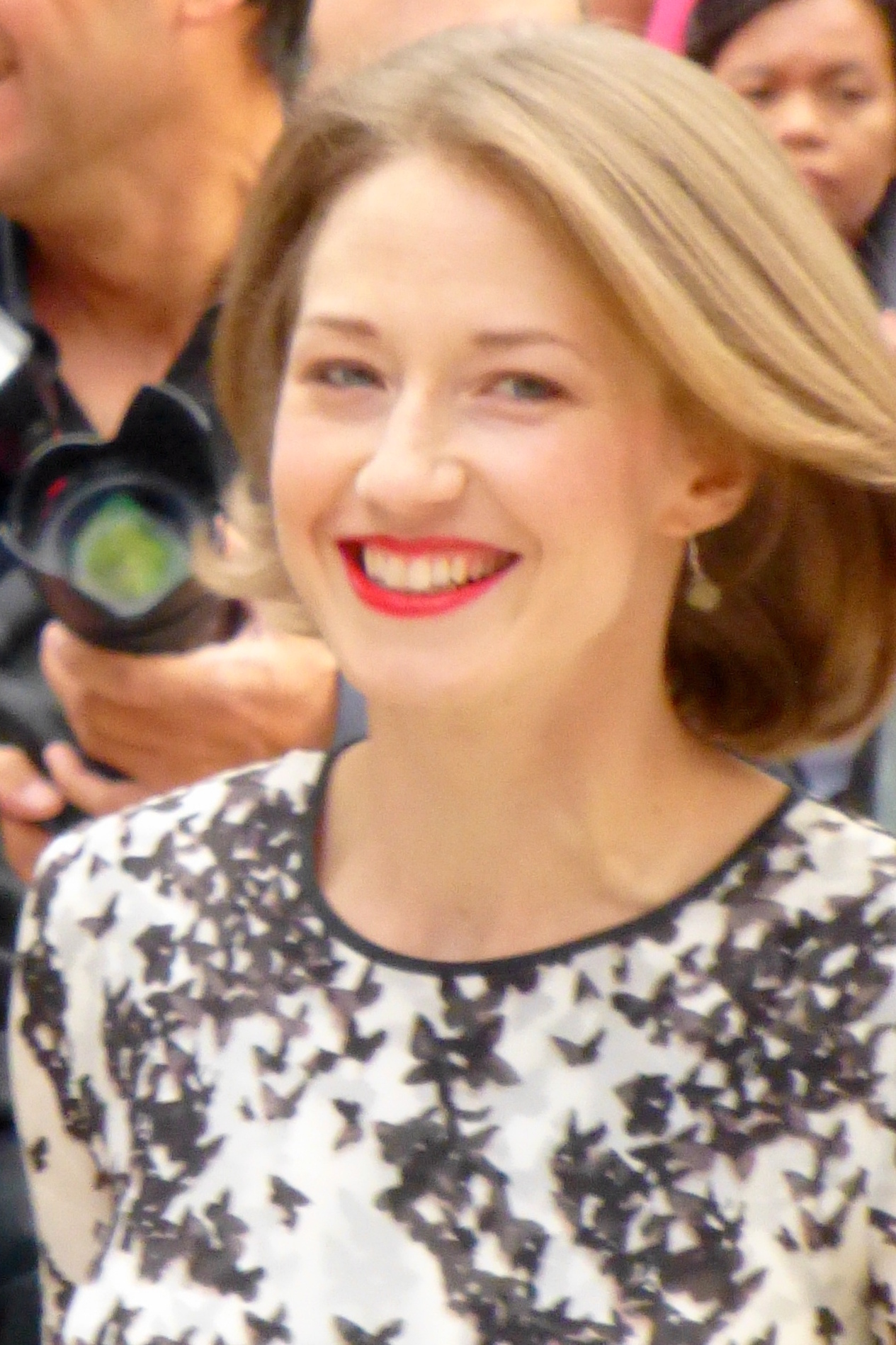
Carrie Coon's performance in the episode received widespread acclaim from reviewers.

"The Book of Nora" was universally acclaimed by critics, many of whom hailed it as one of the greatest series finales in television history. Praise was given to the episode's script, acting, thematic and emotional depth, and semi-ambiguous ending. Coon's performance in particular was roundly applauded. On Rotten Tomatoes, the episode has an approval rating of 100% based on 27 reviews, with an average rating of 9.60 out of 10, with the critics' consensus stating, "One of TV's best dramas closes with a gratifying and somehow sweet final chapter to a powerful, unique, and heartbreaking story that ends on a cryptic yet comforting note."

Matt Fowler of IGN gave the episode a 10 out of 10, calling the finale "simple yet dazzlingly moving and stupendously satisfying." Fowler appreciated the ambiguity of the final scene, suggesting that it invited a "fascinating mini-debate (...) that works to actually draw you into the story more intimately," and praised the "heartwarming" nature of the reunion between Kevin and Nora. He summarized the episode as "The Leftovers boiled down to its most basic and beautiful form - a love story." Joshua Alston of The A.V. Club gave the episode an A, writing, "this is a finale likely to satisfy even those with the most stringent standards, those who have been nervous about how a show as broad and far-reaching as this one could possibly conclude in an appropriate way. Quite simply, it's one of the best series finales I've ever seen, and one that cements The Leftovers as one of the finest drama series in recent memory." Alston particularly praised the episode's small scale and intimate focus on Kevin and Nora's romance, referring to the final scene between the two characters as "one of the most moving and devastating minutes of television" he could remember.

Alan Sepinwall, writing for Uproxx, echoed the sentiment that the episode's ambiguity over Nora's story was a tonally and thematically appropriate way to end the series, writing, "We can treat this like Lindelof's previous series, or so many other great dramas of this century, and demand answers. Or we can recognize that The Leftovers never promised any — that, both within the narrative and throughout Lindelof's publicity for the show over the years, it could not have been more clear that answers to metaphysical questions were besides the point." Sepinwall reserved praise for Coon's performance, referring to the episode as "an hour of watching the hardest working woman in show business display all the range and raw power that gradually made Nora the most important person in the series' world." Sean T. Collins of Vulture gave the finale 5 out of 5 stars, commending the episode for conveying Nora's fate strictly through Coon's monologue. He wrote: "perhaps the most extraordinary thing that has ever happened to a human being in history gets boiled down to a story told over a kitchen table between two estranged lovers, in a calm but sad voice, with a placid but sad face. The Leftovers has the confidence in its camera and in its performers to convey the enormity of it all, and Nora's lonesome acceptance of that enormity, just by watching and listening to Carrie Coon talk."

Spencer Kornhaber of The Atlantic wrote, "a one-of-a-kind, utterly committed work of art and philosophy, the finale was a microcosm of The Leftovers itself. It opened terrifying and closed heart-wrenchingly; it was, at no point, predictable." Sophie Gilbert, who co-authored the review, reacted positively to the episode's suggestion of an alternate reality populated by the departed, calling it "a surprisingly elegant and plausible way to conclude such a remarkable work of television." Noel Murray of The New York Times praised the sequence in which Nora enters the LADR machine, calling it "almost unbearably intense." Murray was similarly positive about the episode's austere focus on Kevin and Nora, applauding Lindelof and the writers for "cleverly [using] that relationship to round out The Leftovers without delivering anything too on-the-nose or overly explanatory."
