= L.A. (EP) =

EP by Teddy Thompson
- Released: 2001
- Genre: Folk rock

Teddy Thompson chronology
| Teddy Thompson (2000) | L.A. (2001) | Blunderbuss (2004) |

L.A. is an EP by singer-songwriter Teddy Thompson, released in 2001 after his self-titled, debut album. The EP was recorded in November 2001 at Fez, NYC by Ed Haber. "Shine So Bright" and "Sorry to See Me Go" later appeared on Thompson's second full-length album, Separate Ways (2005).

== Track listing ==
1. "On My Way"
2. "Almost Famous"
3. "Shine So Bright"
4. "Sorry to See Me Go"
5. "L.A."

== Personnel ==
- Teddy Thompson – guitar, vocals
- Jason Crigler – guitar
- Jeff Hill – bass
- Bill Dobrow – drums
