= The Trackless Woods =

Iris DeMent

Studio album by Iris DeMent
- Released: August 7, 2015
- Genre: Country Folk
- Label: Flariella
- Producer: Iris DeMent and Richard Bennett

Iris DeMent chronology
Sing The Delta (2012)	Iris DeMent (2015)	Workin' on a World (2023)

The Trackless Woods is the sixth album by country and folk singer, Iris DeMent. The lyrics are poems by Anna Akhmatova, as translated by Babette Deutsch and Lyn Coffin, set to compositions by DeMent. Richard Bennett and Leo Kottke accompany Iris DeMent who sings and plays piano.

== Track listing ==
1. "To My Poems" translation by Lyn Coffin, Poems of Anna Andreevna Akhmatova (1983)
2. "Broad Gold" (1915) translation by Babette Deutsch, page 189 A Treasury of Russian Verse (1949)
3. "And This You Call Work"
4. "From The Oriental Notebook"
5. "Prayer" (1915) translation by Babette Deutsch, page 189 A Treasury of Russian Verse (1949)
6. "Not With Deserters" (1923) translation by Babette Deutsch, page 191-192 A Treasury of Russian Verse (1949)
7. "All Is Sold" (1921) translation by Babette Deutsch, page 190 A Treasury of Russian Verse (1949)
8. "Reject The Burden" (1923) translation by Babette Deutsch, page 191 A Treasury of Russian Verse (1949)
9. "From An Airplane"
10. "Oh, How Good" (1940) translation by Babette Deutsch, page 193 A Treasury of Russian Verse (1949)
11. "Like A White Stone" (1916) translation by Babette Deutsch, page 189 A Treasury of Russian Verse (1949)
12. "Song About Songs" (1916) translation by Lyn Coffin, page 31 Poems of Anna Andreevna Akhmatova (1983)
13. "Listening To Singing" (1961) translation by Lyn Coffin, page 90 Poems of Anna Andreevna Akhmatova (1983)
14. "Lot's Wife" (1924) translation by Babette Deutsch, page 192 A Treasury of Russian Verse (1949)
15. "Upon The Hard Crest" (1917) translation by Babette Deutsch, page 190 A Treasury of Russian Verse (1949)
16. "The Souls Of All My Dears"
17. "The Last Toast" (1934) translation by Lyn Coffin, page 50 Poems of Anna Andreevna Akhmatova (1983)
18. "Not With A Lover's Lyre / Anna Akhmatova's Recitation of The Muse" "It's Not With A Lover's Lyre" translation by Lyn Coffin
