= Iris DeMent =

American singer-songwriter (born 1961)

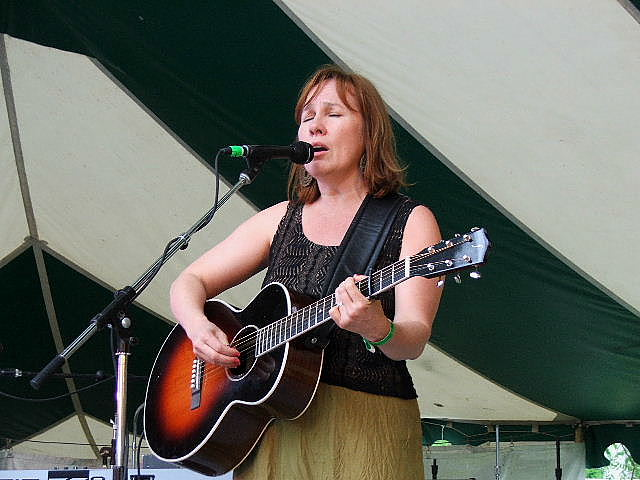
- Iris DeMent at Old Settler's Music Festival – Driftwood, Texas (2007)

Background information
- Born: Iris Luella DeMent; January 5, 1961 (age 65); Paragould, Arkansas, U.S.
- Genres: Country folk; Americana; gospel; folk; alternative country
- Occupation: Singer-songwriter
- Instruments: Vocals, guitar, piano
- Years active: 1991–present
- Labels: Rounder Records (Philo), Warner Bros., Flariella Records
- Spouses: Elmer McCall (m. 1991; div. 1999); Greg Brown (m. 2002)
- Website: www.irisdement.com

Iris Luella DeMent (born January 5, 1961) is an American singer-songwriter and musician. DeMent's musical style includes elements of folk, country and gospel. She has been nominated for a Grammy Award twice.

== Early life ==
DeMent was born in Paragould, Arkansas, the 14th and youngest child of Pat DeMent (1910–1992) and Flora Mae DeMent (1918–2011). Iris's mother had harbored dreams of going to Nashville and starting a singing career. Although she put those plans on hold to get married, her singing voice was an inspiration and influence for her youngest daughter Iris. DeMent was raised in a Pentecostal household. Her family moved from Arkansas to the Los Angeles area when she was three. While growing up, she was exposed to and influenced by country and gospel music. Singing at age five as one of "the little DeMent sisters", Iris had a bad experience when she forgot her words during her first performance, which caused her to avoid performing in public for some time.

DeMent left high school in the tenth grade to work full time at a Kmart store. Her parents required her to get a GED high school diploma. She later went with a boyfriend to Topeka, Kansas, where she attended Washburn University. There she started writing after receiving positive feedback from her English composition professor.

== Music and career ==
In 1986, at age 25, DeMent was inspired to write her first song, "Our Town", when driving through a boarded-up Midwest town. The song lyrics came to her "exactly as it is now", with no need for re-writing, and she realized then that songwriting was her calling.

In 1995, "Our Town" was played during the closing scene for the final episode (July 26, 1995) of the CBS television series Northern Exposure. The song has been recorded by Kate Rusby, Kate Brislin & Jody Stecher, and Trampled by Turtles.

DeMent's first album, Infamous Angel (1992), was released on the Rounder-Philo label, exploring such themes as religious skepticism, small-town life, and human frailty. "Let the Mystery Be" has been covered by a number of artists, including 10,000 Maniacs (whose 'Unplugged' version featured Talking Heads' David Byrne), as well as Alice Stuart. It was also used in the opening scenes of the film Little Buddha (1993).

In the fall of 2015, a version of "Let the Mystery Be" from the Transatlantic Sessions became the musical theme for the opening credits of the second season of the HBO series The Leftovers, replacing the original "Main Title Theme" composed by Max Richter, and it would once again serve as the opening theme for the third-season series finale.

In her second album, My Life (1994), DeMent continued her personal and introspective approach. The record is dedicated to her father, who had died two years earlier. My Life was nominated for a Grammy Award in the Best Contemporary Folk Album category. It also appeared in season 2, episode 7 of the TV show Handmaids Tale.

DeMent's third album, The Way I Should (1996), featuring the protest song "Wasteland of the Free", has been DeMent's most political work. It covers topics such as sexual abuse, religion, government policy, and Vietnam.

In 1997, DeMent sang the duet "Bell Bottomed Tear" as part of The Beautiful South's Much Later with Jools live special.

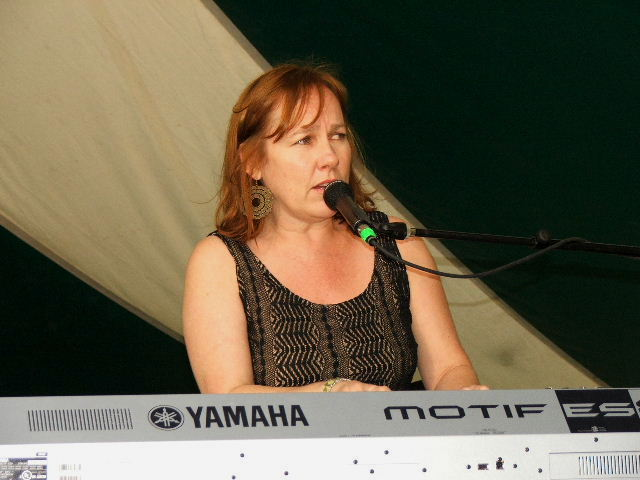
Iris DeMent (age 46) at Old Settler's Music Festival – Driftwood, Texas (2007).

DeMent sang four duets with John Prine on his album In Spite of Ourselves (1999), including the title track.

DeMent appeared in the film Songcatcher (2000), both playing the character Rose Gentry and singing on the soundtrack.

DeMent's duet with Ralph Stanley on "Ridin' That Midnight Train" was the opening track on his album Clinch Mountain Sweethearts: Ralph Stanley & Friends (2001).

In 2004, DeMent released Lifeline, an album of gospel songs. It included 12 covers and one original composition ("He Reached Down"). It was the first album she released on Flariella Records, a label she started herself and named after her mother. A shortened version of her rendition of "Leaning on the Everlasting Arms" was later used in the closing credits of the Coen brothers' film True Grit. On October 2, 2012, DeMent released her first album of original songs in 16 years, Sing the Delta.

DeMent has sung duets with Steve Earle and Emmylou Harris and is featured on the albums of many other performers. She sang the Merle Haggard song "Big City" on Tulare Dust: A Songwriters' Tribute to Merle Haggard. She has made frequent appearances on Garrison Keillor's radio show A Prairie Home Companion. DeMent contributed harmony vocals to "Pallbearer", a song from country artist Josh Turner's album Punching Bag (2012).

In 2015, DeMent released The Trackless Woods, an album based upon and inspired by the words of Russian poet Anna Akhmatova, on her own Flariella record label. She reunited with John Prine in 2016 for his second duets album For Better, or Worse and performed on two tracks. DeMent received the Americana Trailblazer Award at the 2017 Americana Music Honors & Awards.

DeMent's album Workin' on a World (2023) was No. 4 on Robert Christgau's Dean's List for that year.

== Personal life ==
In 1991, DeMent married Elmer McCall; they divorced in 1999.

On November 21, 2002, DeMent married her current spouse, singer-songwriter Greg Brown. They live in rural southeast Iowa with their daughter, whom they adopted at the age of six in 2005 from Russia.

== In popular culture ==
In 1998, the song "Iris" by the rock band Goo Goo Dolls was named after her. Singer and songwriter John Rzeznik had already written the lyrics to the song but was having a problem naming it. He opened up the LA Weekly and noticed that DeMent was playing in town and thought her name was beautiful and then decided to name it after her. Darren Hayman and David Tattersall released a cover of "Hotter Than Mojave in My Heart" in 2026 as a bonus to the Hayman, Watkins, Trout And Lee album.

== Discography ==
=== Albums and chart positions ===
Year	Album	Label	Chart	Peak
1992	Infamous Angel	Philo		
1994	My Life	Warner Bros.	Billboard Heatseekers	16
1996	The Way I Should	Warner Bros.	Billboard Heatseekers	22
2004	Lifeline	Flariella	FolkDJ-L Folk Radio Airplay	15
2012	Sing the Delta	Flariella	Billboard 200	124
2015	The Trackless Woods	Flariella		
2023	Workin' on a World	Flariella		

=== Singles ===
Year	Title	Label	Songs
1992	"Our Town"	Warner Bros.	"Our Town" / "God May Forgive You (But I Won't)" / "Heart's Highway"
1994	"Sweet is the Melody"	Warner Bros.	"Sweet is the Melody" / "French Boy" (live) / "Keep on the Sunny Side" (live)
1996	"Wasteland of the Free"	Warner Bros.	"Wasteland of the Free" (edit) / "The Way I Should" / "Letter To Mom" / "Wasteland of the Free" (album version)

=== Music videos ===
Year	Title	Director
1992	"Our Town"	

=== Other contributions ===
==== Primary/contributing artist ====
- 1994: various artists – Tulare Dust: A Songwriter's Tribute to Merle Haggard (Hightone) – track 2: "Big City"
- 1997: various artists – The Songs of Jimmie Rodgers: A Tribute (Egyptian / Columbia) – track 10: "Hobo Bill's Last Ride"
- 1997: various artists – Folk Live from Mountain Stage (Blue Plate) – track 3: "Sweet is the Melody" (live)
- 1997: various artists – KGSR Broadcasts Vol. 5 (KGSR) – track 1–10: "Let the Mystery Be" (live)
- 1998: various artists – The Horse Whisperer: Songs from and inspired by the Motion Picture (MCA Nashville) – track 11: "Whispering Pines"
- 1998: various artists – The Folkscene Collection: From the Heart of Studio A (Red House) – "Our Town" (live in KPFK Studios)
- 1998: various artists – Real: The Tom T. Hall Project (Sire Records) – track 8: "I Miss A Lot Of Trains"
- 1999: various artists – Bleecker Street: Greenwich Village In The 60's (Astor Place) – track 5: "Pack Up Your Sorrows" (with Loudon Wainwright III)
- 2001: various artists – Songcatcher: Music From and Inspired by the Motion Picture (Vanguard) – track 2: "Pretty Saro"
- 2002: various artists – Going Driftless: An Artist's Tribute to Greg Brown (Red House) – track 3: "The Train Carrying Jimmie Rodgers Home"
- 2002: various artists – WYEP Live & Direct: Volume 4 – On Air Performances
- 2007: various artists – Transatlantic Sessions 3 (Volume 1) (Whirlie) – track 12: "There's a Whole Lot of Heaven"

==== As composer ====
- 1998: The Caravans – Glamorous Heart Motel Blues (Fury) – track 1: "Our Town"
- 2000: Grace Griffith – Minstrel Song (Blix Street) – track 2: "My Life"
- 2001: Joel RL Phelps and the Downer Trio – Inland Empires (12XU) – track 3: "Calling For You"; track 7, "My Life"
- 2002: Aselin Debison – Sweet is the Melody (Odyssey Records) – track 1: "Sweet is the Melody"
- 2002: John Wright – Dangerous Times (Big Sky) – track 1: "When My Mornin' Comes Around"
- 2007: Doug Cox – Canadian Borderline (Malahat Mountain) – track 2: "Let The Mystery Be"
- 2012: Megan Reilly – The Well (Carrot Top) – track 8: "After You're Gone"
- 2017: Bonnie 'Prince' Billy – Best Troubador (Domino) – track 18: "No Time To Cry"

==== Also appears on ====
- 1990: Emmylou Harris – Brand New Dance (Reprise) – "Wheels of Love"; "Brand New Dance" (harmony vocalv)
- 1990: Jann Browne – Tell Me Why (WEA/Atlantic/Curb Records) – Lovebird (harmony vocal)
- 1991: Jann Browne – It Only Hurts When I Laugh – unknown track(s)
- 1993: Nanci Griffith – Other Voices, Other Rooms (Elektra) – "Ten Degrees and Getting Colder"; "Are You Tired of Me My Darling?" (harmony vocal)
- 1994: Tom Paxton – Wearing the Time (Sugar Hill) – "Along the Verdigris" (backing vocal)
- 1997: The Beautiful South – Liar's Bar CD single (A&M/GO! Discs Ltd) – "You’ve Done Nothing Wrong" (harmony vocal, "Later With Jools Holland", live)
- 1997: Tom Russell – The Long Way Around (Hightone) – track 3: "Big Water"; track 17: "Box of Visions" (duets)
- 1998: Randy Scruggs – Crown of Jewels (Reprise) – "Wildwood Flower" (duet with Emmylou Harris); "City of New Orleans" (backing vocal)
- 1998: Jeff Black – Birmingham Road (BMG/Arista) – "Ghosts in the Graveyard" (backing vocal); a second unknown track
- 1999: John Prine – In Spite of Ourselves (Oh Boy) – track 1: "(We're Not) The Jet Set"; track 9: "Let's Invite Them Over"; track 12: "We Could"; track 14: "In Spite of Ourselves" (duets)
- 1999: Tom Russell – The Man from God Knows Where (Hightone) – "Wayfarin’ Stranger" (lead vocal); "Patrick Russell" (duet with Tom Russell); "Ambrose Larsen" (duet with Sondre Bratland); "Acres of Corn" (lead vocal); "The Old Rugged Cross" (duet with Kari Bremnes); "When Irish Girls Grow Up" (duet with Dolores Keane); "Throwin’ Horseshoes at the Moon" (duet with Tom Russell); "Wayfarin’ Stranger (revisited)" (lead vocal); "Love Abides" (duet with Tom Russell)
- 1999: Steve Earle and The Del McCoury Band – The Mountain (E-Squared) – track 4: "I'm Still in Love with You" (duet with Steve Earle)
- 2001: Delbert McClinton – Nothing Personal (New West Records) – "Birmingham Tonight" (harmony vocal)
- 2001: Keith Sykes – Don't Count Us Out (Syren Records) – "It's Just You"; "Lavender Blue" (duets)
- 2001: Ralph Stanley and Friends – Clinch Mountain Sweethearts (Rebel) – track 1: "Ridin' That Midnight Train"; track 11: "Trust Each Other" (duets)
- 2002: Nitty Gritty Dirt Band – Will the Circle Be Unbroken, Volume III (Capitol) – track 1-05, "Mama's Opry" (lead vocal)
- 2004: Eliza Gilkyson – Land of Milk and Honey (Red House Records) – track 6: "Peace Call" (quartet, also with Patty Griffin, and Mary Chapin Carpenter.)
- 2007: Teddy Thompson – Upfront & Down Low (Verve Forecast) – track 6: "My Heart Echoes"
- 2010: John Prine – In Person & On Stage (Oh Boy) – track 3: "In Spite of Ourselves"; track 12: "Unwed Fathers" (duets, live)
- 2012: Josh Turner – Punching Bag (MCA Nashville) – track 9: "Pallbearer" (background vocals)
- 2016: The Pines – Above the Prairie (Red House) – unknown track
- 2016: John Prine – For Better, or Worse (Oh Boy) – track 1: "Who's Gonna Take the Garbage Out"; track 13: "Mr. & Mrs. Used to Be"
- 2019: Ana Egge – single: "Ballad for the Poor Child" (duet with Ana Egge)

== Bibliography ==
- Nicholas Dawidoff (1998). In the Country of Country: A Journey to the Roots of American Music. Vintage Books. ISBN 0-375-70082-X.
- Bill C. Malone (2001). Don't Get Above Your Raisin': Country Music and the Southern Working Class. University of Illinois Press. ISBN 0-252-02678-0.
