= Sing the Delta =

Iris DeMent

Studio album by Iris DeMent
- Released: October 2, 2012
- Genre: Country, gospel
- Label: Flariella

Iris DeMent chronology
Lifeline (2004)	Iris DeMent (2012)	The Trackless Woods (2015)

Sing The Delta is the fifth album by country and folk singer, Iris DeMent. The album, released on October 2, 2012, via Flariella Records, comprises DeMent's first original material in sixteen years.

== Background ==
The album's material has strong ties to DeMent's upbringing. According to DeMent, Sing the Delta is a reference to the Arkansas Delta, a natural region in the State of Arkansas and where her family lives. She says of the title track: "And that was that part of the country, the Arkansas Delta. ... A lot of what I had stamped on me — musically, Sunday-dinner-wise, religion and everything else — was a direct outgrowth of that."

Commenting on the sixteen-year wait between new material, DeMent has stated in an interview that she has come to terms with the fact she doesn't write new songs very often. "I finally made peace with that. It took me a long time, but I finally have fully accepted I’m not in charge of that. So I just made the decision to live my life." In another interview, when asked what she had been doing in the sixteen years since her previous album, she quipped "I painted the living room a lot of different colors."

== Critical reception ==
Professional ratings
Aggregate scores
Source	Rating
Metacritic	83/100
Review scores
Source	Rating
AllMusic	3.5/5 stars
Chicago Tribune	3.5/4 stars
The Guardian	4/5 stars
Mojo	4/5 stars
MSN Music (Expert Witness)	A−
PopMatters	8/10
Rolling Stone	3.5/5 stars
Slant Magazine	4.5/5 stars
The Telegraph	4.5/5 stars
Uncut	9/10

Sing the Delta has largely received a positive response. Rolling Stone notes: "...these artisanal songs of love and doubt wear their homeliness proudly; the effect is like finding a bountiful farm stand in the middle of nowhere." Stuart Munro from The Boston Globe calls the album:" a work of rare, unvarnished grace and power". The UK's The Guardian newspaper wrote that the album:"sounds as powerful and timeless as anything she has done". In addition, the review praised the quality of DeMent's songwriting.

AllMusic praised DeMent's voice, saying: "She's a careful, detailed songwriter with a confessional edge and a good sense of narrative, and her voice is a marvelous instrument that seems to rise out of the previous century". The review does, however, suggests that Sing the Delta is not an album that one can often sing along to. In another glowing review, Slant Magazine's Jonothan Keefe writes: "DeMent's fully invested performances are lived-in and soulful, heightening the intensity of the experiences she's singing about. Over the course of Sing the Delta, DeMent confesses, wails, and testifies, and there's simply no one else in popular music who tells their truths with such urgency or clarity."

== Track listing ==
1. "Go On Ahead and Go Home"
2. "Before the Colors Fade"
3. "The Kingdom Has Already Come"
4. "The Night I Learned How Not to Pray"
5. "Sing the Delta"
6. "If That Ain't Love"
7. "Livin' On the Inside"
8. "Makin' My Way Back Home"
9. "Mornin' Glory"
10. "There's a Whole Lotta Heaven"
11. "Mama Was Always Tellin' Her Truth"
12. "Out of the Fire"
