= Lifeline (Iris DeMent album) =

Studio album by Iris DeMent
- Released: October 19, 2004
- Recorded: 2004
- Studio: Cowboy Arms (Nashville, Tennessee); Ozark Folk Center (Mountain View, Arkansas); Signal Path Studios (Nashville, Tennessee); Master Mix (Minneapolis, Minnesota)
- Genre: Country folk, gospel
- Length: 52:01
- Label: Flariella
- Producer: Jim Rooney, Iris DeMent

Iris DeMent chronology
| The Way I Should (1996) | Lifeline (2004) | Sing the Delta (2012) |

Lifeline is the fourth album released by singer-songwriter Iris DeMent, released in 2004, eight years since her previous recording The Way I Should.

== History ==
Lifeline contains many traditional Protestant gospel songs DeMent describes as finding comfort in playing and singing. In her liner notes, DeMent recounts how her mother sang these songs in times of stress looking straight at the sky, "as if she were talking to someone."

DeMent's rendition of "Leaning on the Everlasting Arms" accompanies the closing credits of the Coen brothers' True Grit (2010).

== Reception ==
Professional ratings
Review scores
| Source | Rating |
|---|---|
| AllMusic | 3/5 stars |
| Robert Christgau | (2-star Honorable Mention) |
| The Guardian | 2/5 stars |

Thom Jurek of AllMusic writes: "... [DeMent] claims that for her, too, the music contained here became her lifeline through a season of hardship... While this is far from a full return to form for Dement, it is truly good to have her back." Music critic Robert Christgau wrote "Her heart cherishes Jesus' memory, but her mind, voice, and soul remain her own."

== Track listing ==
1. "I've Got That Old Time Religion in My Heart" (Hurdist Milsap) – 3:04
2. "Blessed Assurance" (Fanny Crosby) – 6:26
3. "Fill My Way with Love" (George W. Sebren) – 3:02
4. "Hide Thou Me" (Fanny Crosby) – 5:09
5. "The Old Gospel Ship" (Traditional) – 3:10
6. "Sweet Hour of Prayer" (William W. Walford) – 5:09
7. "That Glad Reunion Day" (Adger M. Pace) – 2:10
8. "Leaning on the Everlasting Arms" (Anthony Johnson Showalter, Elisha Hoffman) – 2:53
9. "He Reached Down" (Iris DeMent) – 4:12
10. "Near the Cross" (Fanny Crosby) – 5:03
11. "I Never Shall Forget the Day" (G.T. Speer) – 2:42
12. "I Don't Want to Get Adjusted" (Sanford J. Massengale) – 3:38
13. "God Walks the Dark Hills" (Audra Czarnikow) – 5:23

== Personnel ==
- Iris DeMent – vocals, guitar, piano
- Bo Ramsey – electric guitar, slide guitar, Weissenborn
- David Roe – bass
- Mark Howard – guitar, mandolin
- Stuart Basore – dobro
- Stuart Duncan – background vocals
- Pat Enright – background vocals
- Alan O'Bryant – background vocals
- Jim Rooney – background vocals
- Barry Tashian – background vocals

== Production notes ==
- Produced by Jim Rooney and Iris DeMent
- Engineered by Richard Adler, Mark Howard, David Ferguson and David Shipley
- Mixed by Tommy Tucker
- Cover photo by Pieta Brown
