= Teddy Thompson (album) =

Studio album by Teddy Thompson
- Released: August 29, 2000
- Genre: Folk, alternative country
- Label: Virgin
- Producer: Joe Henry, John Henry

Teddy Thompson chronology
Teddy Thompson (2000)	L.A. (2001)

Professional ratings
Review scores
Source	Rating
AllMusic	4/5 stars

Teddy Thompson is the self-titled, debut album by singer-songwriter Teddy Thompson, son of Richard and Linda Thompson. The album was released under Virgin Records on August 29, 2000. His father plays guitar, friend and fellow singer-songwriter Rufus Wainwright contributes backing vocals on "So Easy" and co-wrote "Missing Children" and Emmylou Harris duets on "I Wonder if I Care as Much".

== Track listing ==
1. "Wake Up"
2. "Love Her For That"
3. "Brink of Love"
4. "So Easy"
5. "All I See"
6. "All We Said"
7. "A Step Behind"
8. "Missing Children"
9. "Thanks a Lot"
10. "Days in the Park"
- Hidden Track: "I Wonder if I Care as Much" (The Everly Brothers) with Emmylou Harris

== Personnel ==
- Judith Owen – backing vocals (track: 1)
- Rufus Wainwright – backing vocals (track: 4)
- Sally Dworsky – backing vocals (tracks: 3, 6)
- Jennifer Condos – bass
- Curt Bisquera – drums, percussion
- Chris Bruce – guitar (tracks: 4, 7),
- Greg Leisz – guitar (tracks: 5, 6, 8, 10),
- Gregg Arreguin – guitar (track: 1)
- Jon Brion – guitar (tracks: 6, 7)
- Randy Jacobs – guitar (tracks: 2, 3, 9)
- Richard Thompson – guitar (tracks: 1, 2, 5, 6, 10)
- Jamie Muhoberac – keyboards
- Teddy Thompson – vocals, acoustic guitar, harmonium
- Emmylou Harris – vocals (hidden track)
