= The Way I Should =

Studio album by Iris DeMent
- Released: October 8, 1996
- Studio: Scruggs Sound (Berry Hill, Tennessee)
- Genre: Country Folk
- Length: 50:07
- Label: Warner
- Producer: Randy Scruggs

Iris DeMent chronology
My Life (1993)	The Way I Should (1996)	Lifeline (2004)

The Way I Should is the third album released by singer-songwriter Iris DeMent. It peaked at number 22 on the Billboard Heatseekers chart.

Guests include guitarist Mark Knopfler and Delbert McClinton, who duets with DeMent on "Trouble".

The album was nominated for the Grammy Award for Best Contemporary Folk Album at the 40th Annual Grammy Awards.

Professional ratings
Review scores
Source	Rating
AllMusic	3/5 stars
Chicago Tribune	4/4 stars
Christgau's Consumer Guide	A
The Encyclopedia of Popular Music	3/5 stars
Entertainment Weekly	A−
Los Angeles Times	2.5/4 stars
The New Rolling Stone Album Guide	3/5 stars
Orlando Sentinel	3/5 stars
Spin	4/10

== Track listing ==
All tracks are written by Iris DeMent, except as noted

No.	Title	Writer(s)	Length
1.	"When My Mornin' Comes Around"		3:49
2.	"There's a Wall in Washington"		5:19
3.	"Wasteland of the Free"		5:13
4.	"I'll Take My Sorrow Straight"	Iris DeMent; Elmer McCall	3:24
5.	"This Kind of Happy"	Iris DeMent; Merle Haggard	3:43
6.	"The Way I Should"		4:24
7.	"Letter to Mom"		3:15
8.	"Keep Me God"		3:46
9.	"Quality Time"		4:03
10.	"Walkin' Home"		5:39
11.	"Trouble" (duet with Delbert McClinton)	Iris DeMent; Elmer McCall	7:32
Total length:			50:07

== Personnel ==
- Iris DeMent – vocals, guitar, piano
- Mark Knopfler – National guitar (track 6)
- Chuck Leavell – organ, piano, accordion
- Lonnie Mack – electric guitar (track 11)
- Brent Mason – electric guitar solo (track 5)
- Paul Franklin – steel guitar
- John Jennings – guitar, EBow, 6-string bass
- Bekka Bramlett – background vocals (track 3)
- Billy Burnette – background vocals (track 3)
- Melodie Crittenden – background vocals (tracks 6, 9)
- Delbert McClinton – harmonica, vocals (track 11)
- Dave Pomeroy – bass
- Tom Roady – tambourine
- Tammy Rogers – fiddle, mandolin, violin, cello, viola
- Harry Stinson – drums
- Russ Taff – background vocals (track 3)
- Earl Scruggs – banjo (track 9)
- Randy Scruggs – guitar
- Stuart Smith – guitar, slide guitar

== Production notes ==
- Produced by Randy Scruggs
- Engineered and mixed by Chuck Ainlay
- Mastered by Denny Purcell
- Assistant Engineers – Chris Rua and Graham Lewis
- Photography by Debbie Spinelli and Rocky Schenck
- Art direction and design by Stephen Walker and Terry Robertson
