= Frasier (lion) =

Safari lion in Irvine, California, US (1952–1972)

Frasier (1952 – 13 July 1972), also known as Frasier the Sensuous Lion, was a captive male lion who became famous during his brief time at the Lion Country Safari franchise in Irvine, California, a drive-through safari park, for his prodigious feats of siring lion cubs. After his death, a motion picture was made about him.

== From circus to safari park ==
The lion was 18 or 19 years old, analogous to a human aged 80+, toothless and ill when he was bought by the safari park from a bankrupt Mexican circus in 1970. Named "Frasier" by park employees, he "hobbled about on weakened legs, his once-lustrous coat was scruffy and his tongue sagged from a toothless mouth," according to the Los Angeles Times.

LIFE Magazine said of Frasier, "He is underweight and splay-footed....His fur resembles an old moth-balled coat, and he sleeps 19 hours a day. The muscles in his tongue are so shot that it unreels from his mouth like a slobbery red carpet."

The lean lion was put on a special diet and gained 100 pounds. He was expected to live out his days in retirement at Lion Country Safari, not become a world-renowned champion stud.

== Fatherhood ==
Frasier was introduced to the pride of six lionesses named Lefty, Linda, Nadula, Sally, Stompy, and Zona. There were no expectations that he would be accepted by them, as they had rejected relations with five other younger males, often violently. Overnight, the lionesses began mating with Frasier, and took to nurturing him too. The lionesses would chew their toothless mate's food for him.

LIFE Magazine reported that the lionesses "were sprawled protectively around Frasier," and would offer him choice meats and would not begin to eat until he had finished his meal. Within seven weeks, all six lionesses were pregnant and he sired the first 33 of his 35 cubs within 16 months.

Because of his reputation as a lover, the old lion soon became a major attraction at the park, despite his advanced age, torpor, and unsightly appearance (characterized by a scruffy coat and his tongue perpetually sticking out of his mouth). Los Angeles Times columnist John Hall reported that viewing Frasier in his haunts was not exciting, writing:

"[Frasier was] asleep on his back, his paws dangling in the sky....

A ranger in a Jeep tossed meat hunks. Frasier's eyes popped open. He yawned and struggled to his feet.... His favorite wives of the moment, walked on each side, holding him up....

He leaned over for the meat and missed, his tongue lolling in the dirt six inches off target. He didn't care. He went back to sleep."

Frasier typically slept 19 hours a day, huddled side-by-side with lionesses and their cubs.

== Father of the Year ==
Nonetheless, park attendance climbed 20% due to the fame that accrued to Frasier for the feat of fathering multiple lion cubs. Eventually, he sired litters totaling 35 lion cubs with the lionesses. The secret to his success apparently was a strong libido, as his life in a circus apparently hadn't caused him the stress of competing with other males, and by allowing the females to initiate mating.

As a result of his new-found celebrity, T-shirts, watches, and other souvenirs were made featuring a photo of Frasier. The California State Assembly declared Frasier "Father of the Year."

== Death and legacy ==
Frasier died of pneumonia on 13 July 1972 and was buried at Lion Country Safari, his grave marked by a six-foot-tall wooden cross. Adopted as a mascot by the Scottish Clan Fraser, he received the clan's funeral rites at his internment, which was attended by clan members dressed in kilts, who mourned his passing with bagpipe music. A tree also was planted at Frasier's grave site.

In 1973, a feature film inspired by Frasier's life, Frasier the Sensuous Lion (also known as Frasier the Lovable Lion) was released. The film was directed by Pat Shields and starred Michael Callan, Katherine Justice and Mark Lawrence. The role of Frasier was played by another lion, Neil. Filming took place at Lion Country Safari. A planned sequel, Son of Frasier, was to be filmed in Africa starring Callan, but was never produced.

Attendance at the Irvine park declined sharply after Frasier's death, eventually closing in 1984. The property was then subleased to the operators of the Wild Rivers water park, the Camp Frasier (later Camp James) summer camp (which was named for Frasier) and the Irvine Meadows Amphitheatre. According to local lore, when the property was eventually turned into residential buildings as Los Olivos Apartment Village, Frasier's burial spot was spared and not paved over.

A 2017 episode of the American supernatural drama television series The Leftovers, entitled "It's a Matt, Matt, Matt, Matt World", features a cult that worships Frasier through ritualistic orgies. Series co-creator Damon Lindelof likened the cult to the ending of the Book of Exodus, stating, "it felt like it's that moment when Moses comes down from the mountaintop with the Commandments and all the Israelites are worshipping the golden calf and fucking each other. So that night before I just googled the words 'sex lion'."
