= Workin' on a World =

Studio album by Iris DeMent
- Released: February 24, 2023
- Recorded: 2019, 2022
- Studios: Cowboy Arms (Nashville, Tennessee); Alex the Great (Nashville, Tennessee)
- Genres: Country folk; political music
- Length: 62:43
- Language: English
- Label: Flariella Records
- Producers: Richard Bennett; Pieta Brown; Iris DeMent; Jim Rooney

Iris DeMent chronology
The Trackless Woods (2015)	Workin' on a World (2023)

Workin' on a World is a 2023 studio album by American singer-songwriter Iris DeMent. The album explores political and religious themes, discussing activism and hope for the future; it has received positive reviews from critics.

== Recording and release ==
DeMent was inspired to write her first new music in several years after the 2016 United States presidential election and her engagement with activism and political music, such as the 2017 song "We Won’t Keep Quiet". After going to the studio in 2019, she felt the music was not working as an album and shelved the recordings, only to have her stepdaughter Pieta Brown encourage her to finish them. A few sessions in 2022 completed the music and she debuted the title track in January 2023 before the album was released the following month.

== Reception ==
Professional ratings
Aggregate scores
Source	Rating
AnyDecentMusic?	7.6/10 (5 reviews)
Metacritic	85/100 (7 reviews)
Review scores
Source	Rating
AllMusic	4.5/5 stars
Pitchfork	8.0/10
PopMatters	8/10

Editors of AnyDecentMusic? rated this album 7.6 out of 10, based on five reviews. Workin' on a World received positive reviews from critics noted at review aggregator Metacritic. It has a weighted average score of 85 out of 100, based on seven reviews.

Reviewing the album for AllMusic, Timothy Monger claimed; "On Workin', the veteran singer/songwriter returns to her country gospel wheelhouse with renewed purpose to deliver a collection that is as timely as it is timeless. In a broad sense, she has made a protest album, one which speaks to present-day issues (gun violence, police brutality, climate change) in a way that inspires activism rather than despair." Jim Hynes of Glide Magazine calls this release "one powerful, deep dose of positivity, purposely overstated, with the whole bigger than any single song". In The New Yorker, David Cantwell explored the political music dimension of DeMent's songwriting, writing that "she has never sung so freely before". Stephen Deusner profiled the musician for The New York Times upon release and characterizes this as "an album about DeMent’s ongoing quest to find her place, about passing the wisdom of the generation that came before her to the one that follows" and "full of what might be called marching songs, which are meant to inspire listeners, to show them the hard road ahead and to spur them along". Ann Powers of NPR reviewed the title track and noted its religious themes, writing that the song is "a hallelujah for the good done by those who lay the path toward good even if they may not walk its full length". Writing for Pitchfork, Sam Sodomsky rated this release 8.0 out of 10, writing that decades into her career, "DeMent has found new ways to reach higher ground". Steve Horowitz of PopMatters also gave an 8 out of 10, writing that she "sings from the heart" on "songs [that] are powerful statements of love and indictments of bad behavior". Editors of Rolling Stone highlighted this release with the Hear This branding and critic Jonathan Bernstein wrote that her music has "rarely felt so urgent" and while the singer "is bold enough to risk corniness" in exploring genuine political conviction, "these messages of spirit-rising and movement-building feel less like MSNBC screeds than warm invitations toward a righteous calling".

In a mid-year review, Rolling Stone India included the release in their list of the "best albums of 2023 so far". Carl Wilson at NPR Music chose this to be among the 50 best albums of 2023. This album was included in a list of 24 runners-up for the best albums of 2023 in Slate. Editors at AllMusic included this on their list of the best albums of 2023, as well as favorite folk and Americana albums and country albums of 2023. Editors at Rolling Stone included this among the best country and Americana albums of 2023. Dan DeLuca of The Philadelphia Inquirer ranked this number four on albums of 2023.

== Track listing ==
I feel like a part of this human family that's been here a really long time and some number of us is going on, and I've got work to do.

— DeMent on the title track and themes of this album.

All songs written by Iris DeMent, except where noted

1. "Workin’ on a World" – 3:49
2. "Goin’ Down to Sing in Texas" – 8:06
3. "Say a Good Word" – 4:56
4. "The Sacred Now" (Pieta Brown and DeMent) – 4:12
5. "I Won’t Ask You Why" (P. Brown and DeMent) – 4:02
6. "Warriors of Love" – 5:40
7. "Let Me Be Your Jesus" (Greg Brown and DeMent) – 3:59
8. "The Cherry Orchard" – 4:13
9. "Nothin’ for the Dead" – 3:38
10. "Mahalia" – 5:03
11. "How Long" – 4:04
12. "Walkin’ Daddy" (G. Brown) – 6:30
13. "Waycross, Georgia" (G. Brown and Samuel E. Mann) – 4:30

== Personnel ==
"Workin' on a World"

Recorded at Alex the Great Studios

- Iris DeMent – piano, vocals, harmony vocals, production
- Roland Barber – trombone
- Richard Bennett – guitar, production
- Pieta Brown – production
- Chris Donohue – bass
- John Fumo – trumpet
- Jim Hoke – saxophone
- Brad Jones – recording, mixing
- Bryan Owings – percussion

"Goin' Down to Sing in Texas"

Recorded at Alex the Great Studios

- Iris DeMent – piano, vocals, production
- Richard Bennett – guitar, production
- Pieta Brown – production
- Chris Donohue – bass
- Jon Graboff – pedal steel guitar
- Brad Jones – Hammond B3 electric organ, recording, mixing
- Bryan Owings – percussion

"Say a Good Word"

Recorded at Alex the Great Studios

- Iris DeMent – piano, vocals, harmony vocals, production
- Richard Bennett – guitar, production
- Pieta Brown – harmony vocals, production
- Chris Donohue – bass
- Jon Graboff – pedal steel guitar
- Brad Jones – recording, mixing
- Bryan Owings – percussion

"The Sacred Now"

Recorded at Alex the Great Studios

- Iris DeMent – vocals, harmony vocals, production
- Richard Bennett – electric guitar, 12-string guitar, production
- Pieta Brown – vocals, harmony vocals, production
- Chris Donohue – bass
- Jon Graboff – pedal steel guitar
- Brad Jones – Hammond B3 electric organ, recording, mixing
- Bryan Owings – percussion

"I Won't Ask You Why"

Recorded at Cowboy Arms Hotel & Recording Spa

- Iris DeMent – piano, vocals, production
- Richard Bennett – guitar
- Pieta Brown – piano, vocals
- Cameron Davidson – recording
- Chris Donohue – bass
- Jon Graboff – pedal steel guitar
- Mark Howard – guitar
- Brad Jones – additional recording, mixing
- Bryan Owings – percussion
- Jim Rooney – production

"Warriors of Love"

Recorded at Alex the Great Studios

- Iris DeMent – piano, vocals, production
- Richard Bennett – guitar, production
- Pieta Brown – production
- Chris Donohue – bass
- Jon Graboff – pedal steel guitar
- Brad Jones – recording, mixing
- Bryan Owings – percussion

"Let Me Be Your Jesus"

Recorded at Alex the Great Studios

- Iris DeMent – piano, vocals, production
- Richard Bennett – guitar, production
- Pieta Brown – production
- Chris Donohue – bass
- John Fumo – flugelhorn
- Brad Jones – recording, mixing
- Bryan Owings – percussion

"The Cherry Orchard"

Recorded at Cowboy Arms Hotel & Recording Spa

- Iris DeMent – piano, vocals, production
- Cameron Davidson – recording
- Chris Donohue – bass
- Mark Howard – guitar, mandolin
- Jon Graboff – pedal steel guitar
- Brad Jones – additional recording, mixing
- Bryan Owings – percussion
- Jim Rooney – production

"Nothin' for the Dead"

Recorded at Cowboy Arms Hotel & Recording Spa

- Iris DeMent – vocals, production
- Roland Barber – trombone
- Richard Bennett – guitar, production
- Pieta Brown – production
- Cameron Davidson – recording
- Chris Donohue – bass
- John Fumo – trumpet
- Jon Graboff – pedal steel guitar
- Jim Hoke – saxophone
- Mark Howard – guitar
- Brad Jones – additional recording, mixing
- Phil Madeira – Wurlitzer electric piano
- Bryan Owings – percussion
- Jim Rooney – production

"Mahalia"

Recorded at Alex the Great Studios

- Iris DeMent – piano, vocals, production
- Richard Bennett – guitar, production
- Pieta Brown – production
- Chris Donohue – bass
- Jon Graboff – pedal steel guitar
- Brad Jones – Hammond B3 electric organ, recording, mixing
- Bryan Owings – percussion

"How Long"

Recorded at Cowboy Arms Hotel & Recording Spa

- Iris DeMent – piano, vocals, production
- Cameron Davidson – recording
- Chris Donohue – bass
- Jon Graboff – pedal steel guitar
- Mark Howard – guitar
- Brad Jones – additional recording, mixing
- Phil Madeira – Hammond B3 electric organ
- Bryan Owings – percussion
- Jim Rooney – production

"Walkin' Daddy"

Recorded at Alex the Great Studios

- Iris DeMent – piano, vocals, production
- Richard Bennett – guitar, production
- Pieta Brown – production
- Jon Graboff – pedal steel guitar
- Chris Donohue – bass
- Brad Jones – recording, mixing
- Bryan Owings – percussion
- Marty Stuart – mandolin

"Waycross, Georgia"

Recorded at Cowboy Arms Hotel & Recording Spa

- Iris DeMent – piano, vocals, production
- Roland Barber – trombone
- Richard Bennett – acoustic high string and Tic Tac bass guitars, production
- Pieta Brown – production
- Cameron Davidson – recording
- Chris Donohue – bass
- John Fumo – trumpet
- Jon Graboff – pedal steel guitar
- Jim Hoke – saxophone
- Mark Howard – guitar
- Brad Jones – additional recording, mixing
- Bryan Owings – percussion
- Jim Rooney – production

Technical personnel

- Iris DeMent – interior photography
- Jim DeMain – mastering at YesMaster Studios, Nashville, Tennessee, United States
- Ingrid Weise – cover photo and design

== See also ==
- 2023 in American music
- List of 2023 albums
