= Wasteland of the Free =

Song by Iris Dement

from the album The Way I Should
- Released: October 1996

"Wasteland of the Free" is a song written and performed by Iris Dement from her 1996 studio album The Way I Should.

== Critical reception ==
“The more I hear and learn about the world and all the injustice that goes on—the poverty, the terrible things that happen-it makes me realize that maybe I should begin writing more and more about these subjects. This has got to be done so that more people understand what we are really facing.” — Iris Dement, interview with critic Richard Phillips, April 18, 1998.

The social and political orientation of several songs in The Way I Should, delivered from a left perspective, was widely acknowledged upon its release. Rhino Entertainment notes that Dement shifted her focus from interpersonal concerns to matters dealing with social inequality. The reviewers at Rhino praised the album for its “daring” and urged readers to revisit the work.

In an article entitled "Iris DeMent song provokes intense debate," entertainment critic Richard Phillips of the World Socialist Web Site describes the song as "a blunt indictment of the right-wing political and social agenda dominating in the US." Phillips adds that "'Wasteland of the Free' still has a tremendous ability to provoke serious reflection and discussion about social and political life, not just in America, but around the world."

Raised in a large family by Pentecostal parents, Dement, though no longer a member of the church, was imbued with a belief that "evil" must be identified, exposed and publicly condemned. New York Times music critic Stephen Deusner writes: "That idea is rooted deep in DeMent's experience growing up in church, and it has inspired all of her albums to some extent, but especially the politically agitated album The Way I Should..."

Characterizing "Wasteland of the Free" as "a righteous progressive broadside," New York Times critic David Cantwell reports that "DeMent's dissenting voice was nearly solitary in country circles" upon its release in 1996. Over twenty years later, Cantwell observed that since then "many newer country and country-adjacent artists are leaning in DeMent's direction."

== Religious influence ==
Raised in the Pentecostal faith, Dement left the church while she was in her mid-teens:

I was about 16 years old. This was a very difficult thing for me because it had been my whole world. But I had to break away in order to live with myself. There were so many things that I just didn't agree with. It was hard, but I suppose it would have been harder if I hadn't, because I would have been living my life dishonestly.

"As you know, creating is not always easy. There's lots of agony that goes into it. Don't get me wrong, I'm not complaining, because this is how it has been since time began. If you want to make something really worthwhile and true, then you have to suffer for it." —Iris Dement, interview with critic Richard Phillips, April 18, 1998.

Neither "Christian or religious" in her adulthood, her music is nonetheless informed by a principled outlook: "I want my music to somehow show the basic threads of life that bind us all together in some way or another." The political militancy expressed in some of her inspirational "marching songs" in exemplified in "Wasteland of the Free" originated in her religious training: "That's what I like about my Pentecostal upbringing," Dement remarked. It serves to "fortify you in your fight against evil."

Dement's "Wasteland of the Free" is a call to action: "Some things aren't that complicated. There's love and there's hate. There's good and there's evil. Which side are you on? Figure it all out now and go."

== Censorship efforts ==
A year following the 1996 release of The Way I Should, conservative radio programmers disparaged the album, in particular the song "Wasteland of the Free". The lyrics forcefully and unequivocally denounce religious and political bigotry. The work also condemns the disparity in wealth internationally.

A year after its release, Republican State Senator John Grant of Florida launched a campaign in the legislature to cut the annual state funding of $103,000 to Tampa, Florida’s WMNF-FM, the community radio station that aired the album. Grant also cited work by songwriters and musicians Robert Earl Keen and Dan Bern that he found offensive, arguing that the radio station was broadcasting adult programming and were therefore ineligible to receive public funds. The 103K at issue amounted to near 17 percent of the stations operating costs. Senator Grant inferred that the funding would be restored if WMNF-FM modified its programming.

In response, the station's management appealed to its listenership. An emergency fund drive raised $120,000 in a single day. Iris Dement performed a benefit concert to raise revenue for the station. Senator Grant suggested that the shortfall could henceforth be raised in annual community fund drives, but local media outlets and public pressure salvaged a portion of the state funding at 75 percent of its previous level.
