= My Life (Iris DeMent album) =

Studio album by Iris DeMent
- Released: April 12, 1994
- Studios: Cowboy Arms (Nashville, Tennessee)
- Genre: Country folk
- Length: 42:29
- Label: Warner Bros.
- Producer: Jim Rooney

Iris DeMent chronology
Infamous Angel (1992)	My Life (1994)	The Way I Should (1996)

My Life is the second album released by singer-songwriter Iris DeMent. Released on April 12, 1994 on Warner Bros., it peaked at number 16 on the Billboard Heatseekers chart.

The album was dedicated to her father, Patric Shaw DeMent, who died in 1992.

== Critical reception ==
Professional ratings
Review scores
Source	Rating
AllMusic	4/5 stars
Austin American-Statesman	4/5 stars
Chicago Tribune	4/4 stars
Christgau's Consumer Guide	A+
The Encyclopedia of Popular Music	4/5 stars
Entertainment Weekly	A
Los Angeles Times	3.5/4 stars
The New Rolling Stone Album Guide	4/5 stars
Rolling Stone	4/5 stars
Spin Alternative Record Guide	9/10

Spin ranked My Life as the 3rd best album of 1994. Writing in Spin, Eric Weisbard described the album as "...unbreakable gentleness as a modern epiphany about rural values."

Robert Christgau gave the album an A+, which he's done for less than 150 albums out approximately 50,000 graded reviews.

The album was nominated for the Grammy Award for Best Contemporary Folk Album at the 37th Annual Grammy Awards.

== Track listing ==
All songs by Iris DeMent except as indicated.

Side one

1. "Sweet Is the Melody" – 3:41
2. "You've Done Nothing Wrong" – 4:22
3. "Calling for You" – 3:18
4. "Childhood Memories" – 4:38
5. "No Time to Cry" – 6:49

Side two

1. "Troublesome Waters" (Maybelle Carter, Ezra J. Carter, Dixie Deen) – 5:15
2. "Mom and Dad's Waltz" (Lefty Frizzell) – 2:37
3. "Easy's Gettin' Harder Every Day" – 5:01
4. "The Shores of Jordan" – 3:18
5. "My Life" – 3:30

== Personnel ==
- Iris DeMent – vocals, acoustic guitar, harmony vocal, piano on "My Life"
- Richard Bennett – acoustic guitar, electric guitar
- John Catchings – cello
- "Cowboy" Jack Clement – acoustic guitar
- Charles Cochran – piano, keyboards
- Stuart Duncan – fiddle, mandolin
- Mark Howard – acoustic guitar
- Roy Huskey, Jr. – upright bass
- Kenny Malone – percussion
- Pat McInerney – drums
- Phil Parlapiano – accordion on "You've Done Nothing Wrong"
- Al Perkins – dobro
- Pete Wasner – keyboards, piano
- Joy White – harmony vocal on "Childhood Memories"
- Linda Williams – harmony vocal on "The Shores of Jordan"
- Robin Williams – harmony vocal on "The Shores of Jordan"
