= Upfront & Down Low =

Studio album by Teddy Thompson
- Released: July 17, 2007
- Recorded: Brooklyn, NY
- Genre: Country
- Label: Verve Forecast Records
- Producer: Teddy Thompson

Teddy Thompson chronology
Separate Ways (2005)	Upfront & Down Low (2007)	A Piece of What You Need (2008)

Professional ratings
Review scores
Source	Rating
AllMusic	4/5 stars

Upfront & Down Low is the self-produced, third studio album by singer-songwriter Teddy Thompson, released under Verve Forecast Records on July 17, 2007. The album features covers of some of his favorite country songs, along with one original track ("Down Low"). Six songs on the album include string arrangements by Robert Kirby, while "My Blue Tears" features a string arrangement by friend and fellow singer-songwriter Rufus Wainwright.

== Track listing ==
1. "Change of Heart" (Felice Bryant, Boudleaux Bryant) (originally recorded by The Everly Brothers) – 3:05
2. "Touching Home" (Dallas Frazier, A.L. "Doodle" Owens) – 2:46
3. "Walking the Floor Over You" (Ernest Tubb) – 2:24
4. "(From Now On All My Friends Are Gonna Be) Strangers" (Liz Anderson) – 3:06
5. "I'm Left, You're Right, She's Gone" (Sam Kesler, William Taylor) (originally recorded by Elvis Presley) – 4:22
6. "My Heart Echoes" (Homer Bailes, Johnnie Bailes, Zeke Clements, Muriel Deason Wright) – 3:27
7. "The Worst is Yet to Come" (Liz Anderson, Casey Anderson) – 4:26
8. "My Blue Tears" (Dolly Parton) – 3:16
9. "Down Low" (Teddy Thompson) – 5:52
10. "You Finally Said Something Good (When You Said Goodbye)" (Eugene Strasser, George Winters) (originally recorded by Louvin Brothers) – 2:40
11. "She Thinks I Still Care" (Dickey Lee, Steve Duffy) – 3:20
12. "Let's Think About Living" (Boudleaux Bryant) (originally recorded by Bob Luman) – 2:08

– hidden track: "Don't Ask Me to Be Friends" (Gerry Goffin, Jack Keller) (originally by The Everly Brothers)

== Personnel ==
- Strings arranged by Robert Kirby (1,2,4,5,9,10,11) and Rufus Wainwright (8)
- Produced by Teddy Thompson
- Recorded by Brian Fulk at Monkeyboy Studios, Brooklyn, NY
- Mixed by Tom Schick at Monkeyboy Studios, Brooklyn, NY
- Strings recorded at Dubway Studios, New York, NY and Air Edel Studios, London, UK
- Mastered by Greg Calbi at Sterling Sound
- Management: Gary Waldman at Morebarn Music

Brad Albetta (Bass, Vocal), Jeff Hill (Bass), Dan Reiser (Drums, Vocal, Percussion), Greg Leisz (Pedal Steel Guitar, Dobro), Tony Scherr (Guitar), Richard Thompson (Guitar), Marc Ribot (Guitar), Jim Campilongo (Guitar), David Mansfield (Dobro, Mandolin, Viola), Jason Crosby (Piano), Glen Platscha (Keyboards), Julia Kent (Cello), Iris DeMent (Vocal, Piano), Jenni Muldaur (Vocal), Tift Merritt (Vocal), Brian Fulk (Vocal), Antoine Silverman (Violin), Lorenza Ponce (Violin), Chris Cardona (Viola), Anja Wood (Cello), John Singleton (Violin), Sally Herbert (Violin), Claire Orsler (Viola), Dinah Beamish (Cello)

== Chart performance ==
Chart (2007)	Peak position
U.S. Billboard Top Country Albums	49
U.S. Billboard Top Heatseekers	19
