= Action Packed =

Studio album by Richard Thompson
- Released: 2001
- Recorded: 1988–2000
- Genre: Rock
- Length: 76:49
- Label: Capitol
- Producer: Richard Thompson and Cheryl Pawelski

Richard Thompson chronology
Mock Tudor (1999)	Action Packed (2001)	Semi-Detached Mock Tudor (2002)

Professional ratings
Review scores
Source	Rating
AllMusic	4/5 stars
Encyclopedia of Popular Music	4/5 stars

Action Packed is a compilation album by Richard Thompson released in 2001.

The album is a retrospective look at Thompson's time with Capitol Records and brings together songs from each of the albums that he recorded for that label.

Also included are a previously unreleased version of "Persuasion" with son Teddy featured on vocals, and two tracks, "Mr. Rebound" and "Fully Qualified to Be Your Man", that were available on the vinyl issue of Mock Tudor but were excluded from the CD release.

== Track listing ==
All songs written by Richard Thompson except "Persuasion" by Richard Thompson, Peter Filleul and Tim Finn.

1. "Turning of the Tide"
2. "Waltzing's for Dreamers"
3. "1952 Vincent Black Lightning"
4. "I Misunderstood"
5. "I Feel So Good"
6. "Keep Your Distance"
7. "King of Bohemia"
8. "I Can't Wake Up to Save My Life"
9. "Beeswing"
10. "The Ghost of You Walks"
11. "Razor Dance"
12. "Cold Kisses"
13. "Bathsheba Smiles"
14. "Cooksferry Queen"
15. "Uninhabited Man"
16. "Walking the Long Miles Home"
17. "Persuasion"
18. "Mr. Rebound"
19. "Fully Qualified to Be Your Man"
