= It's a Matt, Matt, Matt, Matt World =

- The Leftovers episode
- Episode no.: Season 3 Episode 5
- Directed by: Nicole Kassell
- Written by: Lila Byock; Damon Lindelof
- Production code: T13.20205
- Original air date: May 14, 2017
- Running time: 55 minutes

Guest appearances
- Bill Camp as David Burton; Benito Martinez as Arturo

Episode chronology
← Previous "G'Day Melbourne"	Next → "Certified"

"It's a Matt, Matt, Matt, Matt World" is the fifth episode of the third season of the supernatural drama television series The Leftovers, and the 25th overall. The episode was written by Damon Lindelof and Lila Byock and directed by Nicole Kassell. It aired on HBO in the United States on May 14, 2017.

The episode is the third in the series to focus on the character of Matt Jamison, this time following him on a tumultuous journey to Australia alongside John, Laurie and Michael in an attempt to bring Kevin back home.

"It's a Matt, Matt, Matt, Matt World" was acclaimed by critics, who praised the episode's absurdity, religious symbolism, and Christopher Eccleston's central performance. Many critics called it one of the best episodes of the series.

== Plot ==
In a French nuclear submarine in the South Pacific, a rogue crewman steals a launch key, breaks into the control room, and launches a nuclear missile. The warhead detonates in an unpopulated region of the ocean, but the explosion grounds all flights in Melbourne.

With four days left before the seventh anniversary of the Departure, Matt becomes determined to bring Kevin back to Jarden, believing the town to be the only spot where Kevin can harness his messianic powers to prevent a supposed apocalyptic event. Matt persuades Arturo, a loyal member of Matt's congregation and a pilot, to fly him to Melbourne under the guise of a relief mission, believing that the ruse will help them bypass Australian flight restrictions. Matt plans to go only with John and Michael, but John brings along Laurie, who believes Kevin is undergoing a psychotic break and insists on seeing him. Matt begrudgingly allows her to join the trip.

Midway through the flight, the group learns that they are not permitted to land in Melbourne and will instead have to reroute to Tasmania. Matt attempts to book an 11-hour ferry ride from Tasmania to Melbourne but finds that a private client has reserved the entire boat. The ferry's passengers turn out to be the members of a hedonistic cult that worships a lion named Frasier through mass copulation. The group has also brought a caged lion - one of Frasier's descendants - onto the boat. Matt negotiates with the group's host to let his party onboard.

On the boat, Matt and John argue over the former's enduring belief that Jarden is sacred ground. Matt suffers increasingly severe nosebleeds resulting from his resurgent cancer, which he is keeping secret. In the bathroom, a fellow passenger assumes Matt has been injured in a fight with "God," which Matt learns is in fact a moniker for one of the boat's well-known guests. Curious, Matt travels to the ferry's upper deck to meet "God," who is shown to be the same man Kevin twice encountered while in the afterlife. The man hands Matt a printed card that answers questions he is frequently asked regarding his claims of divinity. Matt later spots the man throw another passenger overboard. Unable to receive anyone's help amidst the orgy, Matt jumps overboard himself in an attempt to save the passenger, but is unsuccessful and is quickly rescued.

Matt attempts to relay his concerns to the boat's captain, who makes no effort to investigate the matter. The captain informs Matt that "God" is David Burton, a former athlete and sportscaster who made headlines after apparently returning from the dead. Burton, now a frequent and notorious guest on the ferry, is given little to no acknowledgement from port authorities. A frustrated Matt berates the party's host for the group's callous indifference, but his utterance of the name, "Frasier" causes the cult members to swarm around Matt and attempt to ceremonially extract a forced ejaculation from him. Matt breaks free and chases after Burton, but Burton incapacitates him. A sympathetic member of the Frasier cult helps Matt get up and warns him to stay on the boat when it docks.

Matt attempts to persuade the others to help him bring Burton to justice, and during an argument, he blurts out that Kevin is experiencing hallucinations of Evie (which Laurie disclosed to him in confidence). However, John does not react angrily, and tells Matt that he will have to face Burton alone. Matt kidnaps Burton and brings him to a secluded area of the ship where the caged lion is being kept. Matt demands a confession from Burton, but Burton continues to give cryptic answers, still playing the role of God. Matt gradually begins talking to Burton as if he were indeed the Biblical God, demanding answers for the Departure as well as his own personal suffering, which he claims was in service of his faith. Burton, however, suggests that Matt has led his entire life out of his own self-interest. Matt unties Burton and asks him to cure him of his cancer; Burton simply reaches towards Matt's face and snaps his fingers.

The following morning, Matt reflects in solitude as the boat reaches the harbor. The captain informs him that a fishing boat discovered a body in the ocean and that Melbourne police plan to arrest Burton when the ferry docks. As the boat's passengers begin to depart, the rogue cult member Matt met earlier releases the lion from its cage. Burton spots the police approaching him and attempts to escape, but the lion mauls him to death. Matt, observing the chaos from the boat, turns to a shocked John, Laurie and Michael and nonchalantly remarks, "That's the guy I was telling you about."

== Production ==
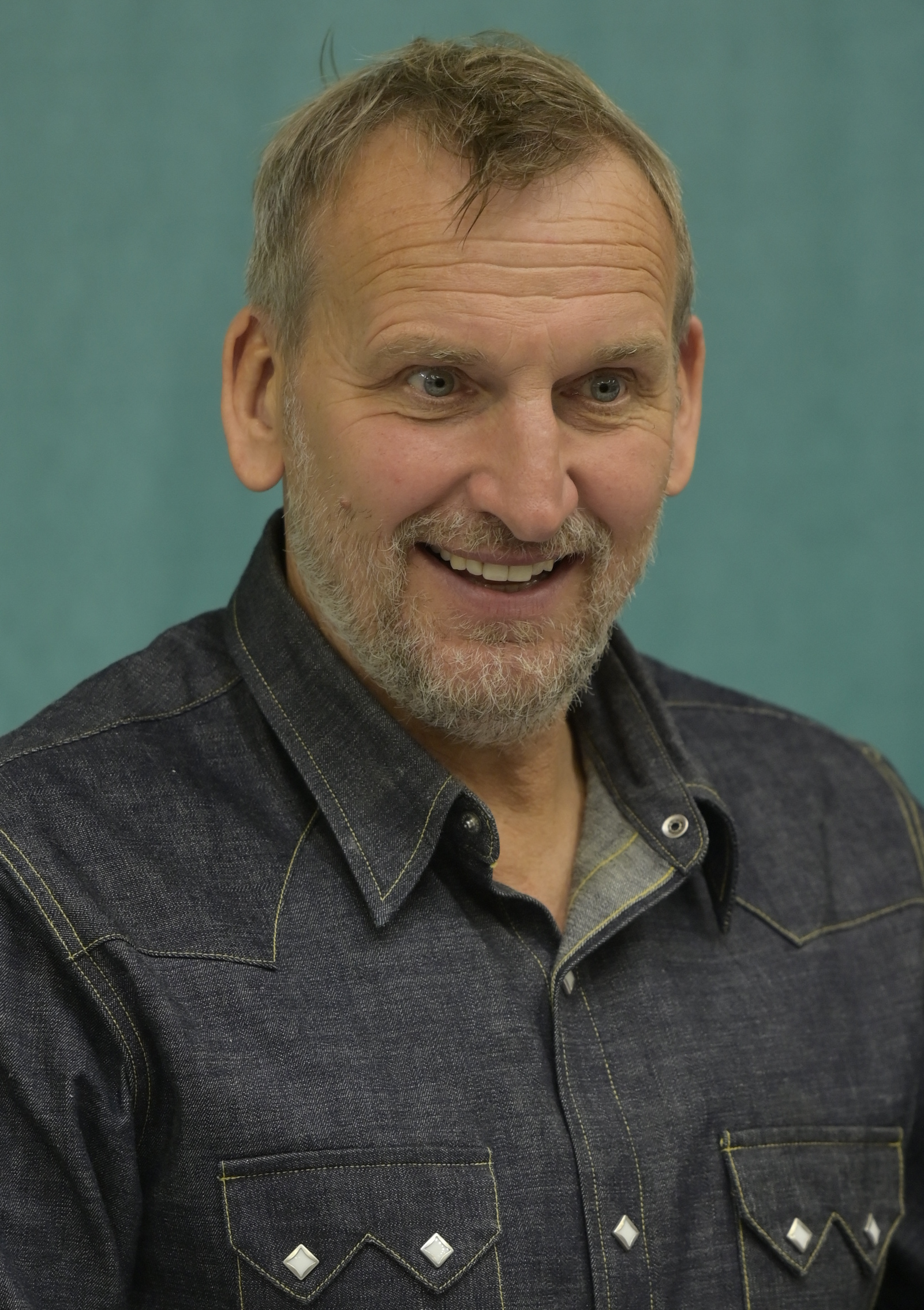
The episode is the third to focus on the character of Matt Jamison, played by Christopher Eccleston.

"It's a Matt, Matt, Matt, Matt World" is the third episode of the series to focus on the character of Matt Jamison after "Two Boats and a Helicopter" in the first season and "No Room at the Inn" in the second. Director Nicole Kassell had previously directed the latter episode, and was chosen to direct "It's a Matt, Matt, Matt, Matt World" based on her creative synergy with Eccleston.

=== Writing ===
The storyline for "It's a Matt, Matt, Matt, Matt World" was constructed from various, often random, ideas within the writers' room. For instance, writer Nick Cuse, son of Lindelof's Lost co-creator Carlton Cuse and the co-writer of season 2's "International Assassin," conceived of the episode's opening scene, which depicted the hijacking of a nuclear submarine by a nude rogue crewman. Elements of the conflict between Matt and "God"/David Burton, such as Matt watching Burton throw a passenger overboard, emerged from an idea from writer Patrick Somerville for an episode structured like an Agatha Christie novel where the characters are "in a confined space with limited time, and something happens that sets a chain of events in motion."

Other ideas, such as the presence of a lion-based sex cult on the boat, were randomly suggested amid humorous back-and-forth between the writers. Lindelof likened the cult to the ending of the Book of Exodus, stating, "it felt like it's that moment when Moses comes down from the mountaintop with the Commandments and all the Israelites are worshipping the golden calf and fucking each other. So that night before I just googled the words 'sex lion'." The "Frasier" lion was inspired by a 1973 film called Frasier the Sensuous Lion, itself based on a real-life case in which the eponymous circus lion fathered 35 cubs within 18 months.

The episode details the character of David Burton (Bill Camp), first introduced in "International Assassin." Lindelof recounted that the idea of Burton as a God-like figure was established during production of the second season, and that the writers cut an exchange from the season 2 finale "I Live Here Now" in which Burton tells protagonist Kevin Garvey (Justin Theroux) that he is God. Burton's "business cards" answering frequently-asked questions were inspired by Back to the Future actor Thomas F. Wilson, who printed cards correcting fans' common misconceptions regarding the franchise. Both Lindelof and Eccleston stated that it was left ambiguous whether Burton heals Matt's cancer at the end of the episode and that they allowed the moment to rest on the actors' performances.

Series co-creator Tom Perrotta, whose source novel featured Matt in a minor role, spoke of the writers' creative choices with the character in the TV series, remarking, "There's a very simple answer to [why we fuck with Matt so much] which is: he is Job. We're fucking with him the way God was fucking with Job." Eccleston interpreted the episode to have changed the nature of Matt's religious faith rather than eliminated it, remarking, "I think his faith has been entirely realigned for the good. His faith is now in humanity, rather than a false idol. I think his faith in a patriarchal or any other gendered idea of God and organized religion has been thankfully demolished." Lindelof stated that the episode's climax depicting Matt talking to God was directly inspired by the Bible, explaining:

The ending of the Book of Job culminates in an actual conversation between Job and God, where Job asks some version of, "Hey, now that I've gone through this, I'm just curious as to why," and God answers in a very lengthy, Ayn Randian monologue, "I don't have to explain myself to you, I'm God." He just says that over and over again and then leaves. And then Job gets everything restored to him. And the moral of the story is... what, exactly?

=== Filming ===
The episode was filmed on a ferry traveling off the coast of Melbourne, which the production had rented for several days. Series producer Eugene Kelly revealed that the ferry's owner helped market its usage on the show to offset its dwindling revenues at the time. Kassell, who described the filming of the episode as a "military operation," noted that several scenes set during the night were filmed during the daytime by blacking out the ferry's windows, allowing for a more efficient shooting schedule. Lindelof noted that the episode was expensive to film, costing the production at least $30,000 more than their allocated budget. A significant portion of the budget went into the computer-generated effects involved in rendering the nuclear submarine environment, as well as depicting Burton's death at the hands of the lion at the end of the episode. The crew brought in a real lion from Brisbane onto the boat for the episode.

Critics pointed out that the episode's title derives from the 1963 film It's a Mad, Mad, Mad, Mad World. The title track for the episode is a prayer that Lindelof attributed to the sailor who launches the nuclear warhead in the episode's opening scene. The prayer was written by Cuse and recited in French by an actor hired by the production. Its lyrics translate in English to "God, Let this missile fly straight and true/ Let it find the volcano nest/ And let the egg there be unhatched/ So that this unborn beast may be destroyed/ Before it rises to destroy the world."

== Reception ==
=== Ratings ===
Upon airing, the episode was watched 0.919 million viewers with an 18-49 rating of 0.4

=== Critical reception ===
"It's a Matt, Matt, Matt, Matt World" received widespread critical acclaim, with particular praise for its absurdity, thematic depth, and Eccleston's performance. On Rotten Tomatoes, the episode has an approval rating of 100% based on 16 reviews, with an average rating of 9.30 out of 10, with the critics' consensus reading, "'It's a Matt, Matt, Matt, Matt World' uses real-life global drama as grist for a strange, funny, and ultimately thought-provoking series of events that tie into familiar Leftovers themes while advancing a central character's arc."

Matt Fowler of IGN gave the episode a 9.2 out of 10, commending the episode for "confidently and creatively completing the 'Matt Suffers Greatly' trilogy" that began with "Two Boats and a Helicopter." Fowler remarked on the episode's unpredictability, and praised the series' "tongue-in-cheek take on the End Times as the inhabitants of this particular world manifest lunacy and bizarre devotion along a spectacular spectrum." Joshua Alston of The A.V. Club gave the episode an A, likening Matt's character arc to Neale Donald Walsch's Conversations with God book series. Alston praised the "riveting" opening sequence as well as the "harrowing and terrifying turn" of the episode's second half involving "God"/David Burton. Sophie Gilbert of The Atlantic named the episode her favorite of the third season yet, also praising the "bravura" opening sequence and interpreting the Frasier cult as an attempt to satirize Matt's belief in Kevin's holiness. Spencer Kornhaber, who reviewed the episode jointly with Gilbert, pointed out the uniquely "giddy" tone of the episode compared to the rest of the series, and felt that the episode's success "simply owes to it directly probing the central conflict of the show—faith vs. reason." Kornhaber reserved praise for the "powerful" scene between Matt and David Burton, chiefly for the Eccleston and Camp's performances.

Alan Sepinwall of Uproxx called the episode "one long, sick joke about the cruelty and capriciousness of belief, of the Almighty, and of life itself" and also praised the episode's climax between Matt and Burton for its unraveling of Matt's character. However, Sepinwall reserved mild criticism for the season's sidelining of the Murphy family, remarking, "it's hard to imagine the John Murphy of season two so calmly taking the news that his wife hadn't told him that Kevin saw a hallucination of Evie — and it's a shame we haven't seen more of him in this new context, nor learned more about this change." Vox called the ending of the episode "moving" for its depiction of Matt's newfound clarity on his life.
