= The Most Powerful Man in the World (and His Identical Twin Brother) =

- The Leftovers episode
- Episode no.: Season 3 Episode 7
- Directed by: Craig Zobel
- Written by: Nick Cuse; Damon Lindelof
- Production code: T13.20207
- Original air date: May 28, 2017
- Running time: 64 minutes

Guest appearances
- Lindsay Duncan as Grace Playford; Jasmin Savoy Brown as Evie Murphy; David Gulpilil as Christopher Sunday; Bill Camp as David Burton/Chief of Staff (voice); Michael Gaston as Dean; Damien Garvey as Kevin Yarborough

Episode chronology
← Previous "Certified"	Next → "The Book of Nora"

"The Most Powerful Man in the World (and His Identical Twin Brother)" is the seventh and penultimate episode of the third season of the HBO drama television series The Leftovers, and the 27th and penultimate episode of the series overall. The episode was written by Nick Cuse and Damon Lindelof and directed by Craig Zobel. It aired in the United States on May 28, 2017.

The episode, fashioned as a successor to the second season's "International Assassin," sees Kevin voluntarily return to the realm of the undead to avert a supposed apocalyptic event on the seventh anniversary of the Sudden Departure.

"The Most Powerful Man in the World (and His Identical Twin Brother)" was widely acclaimed by critics, who praised the episode's surreal design, absurdist humor, visuals, and Justin Theroux's performance.

== Plot ==
In a flashback, Kevin and Nora enjoy a bath together, playfully reflecting on how they would like to be interned after death. Nora reveals that she would like to be cremated and Kevin jokes that he wants to be taxidermied. On the seventh anniversary of the Departure, Kevin Sr., Grace, John and Michael awaken to find Kevin attempting to drown himself in the pond outside the Playfords' farm. The group pulls Kevin out of the water to make sure he remembers to fulfill all of their requests while in the realm of the undead: John wants Kevin to speak to Evie, Grace wants him to find her children, and Kevin Sr. wants him to fulfill his primary task - finding Christopher Sunday and learning an indigenous song that will save the world from an apocalyptic flood prophesied to occur on the seventh anniversary of the Departure. Kevin affirms that he remembers all his commitments, and is placed back in the water.

Kevin awakens on a beach, where he is met by a Russian operative who addresses him as "Kevin Harvey", his assassin alias. The Russian prepares to execute Kevin, but is shot dead by a masked sniper who reveals himself as Dean. Dean takes Kevin to a nearby bungalow and informs him that his mission is to assassinate the President of the United States, who is planning an unauthorized nuclear strike within two hours. Dean destroys all reflective surfaces in the house and finds a typewriter containing a page of an unfinished romance novel. Kevin asks to meet Evie, Grace's children, and Sunday in exchange for completing his mission. Dean gives Kevin an earpiece that puts him contact with David Burton, who has Kevin repeat what Burton whispered in his ear on the bridge the first time they met: that Kevin is the "most powerful man in the world."

On Burton's instructions, Kevin observes his reflection in the shard of a broken mirror despite Dean's warnings not to look at reflective surfaces. He suddenly finds himself dressed in a fully white suit, preparing to give a speech in front of a crowd of Guilty Remnant members gathered outside the Melbourne capitol. Kevin realizes that he has switched places with his identical twin brother - the President. As part of the speech, Kevin calls on Liam Playford - one of Grace's children who is seated in the front row alongside his siblings - to read an essay about why he no longer needs his parents. Kevin attempts to ask Liam questions on his mother's behalf, but Liam does not answer meaningfully.

The event is interrupted by Evie, who in this world is protesting against the GR. Kevin is ushered to his presidential limousine by his security detail, which includes Australian chief of police Kevin Yarborough as his personal bodyguard. On the way, Kevin's chief of staff informs him over the phone that Ukrainian separatists are preparing to release a nuclear warhead, and that the United States has two hours to launch a preemptive attack. Kevin declines the Secretary of Defense's request to raise their alert state to DEFCON 2 and demands to speak with Evie in the limo. He tells Evie on her father's behalf that John loves her, but Evie rebuffs him, revealing that in this reality, the rest of her family perished in a state-ordered drone strike.

Kevin suddenly vomits a spew of water and experiences a series of distorted memories before reawakening at the Playford ranch, where a violent rainstorm is flooding the property. John, Michael and Kevin Sr. pull Kevin out of the pond and take him inside the house. As Kevin has not yet communicated with Christopher Sunday in the land of the dead, Kevin has his father drown him in the Playfords' bathtub so he can complete his mission.

Kevin reemerges outside his presidential bunker in Melbourne. He is subjected to both a facial and penile recognition scan to enter, as well as three security questions - the last of which asks him to name his Secretary of Defense. In a panic, Kevin names Patti Levin, and goes on to meet her in the bunker's situation room. Patti admonishes Kevin to launch a defensive strike against the Ukrainians, but Kevin is adamant on meeting with Sunday first. Patti calls in the Vice President - Meg - who is also reticent to launch the attack. Patti informs Kevin that in order to initiate the launch, they must enact the Fisher Protocol, an "ethical deterrent" in which the nuclear launch key was surgically implanted in the heart of a volunteer (that the President must personally kill to extract the key).

Kevin realizes that the volunteer is his assassin twin, and after taking the U.S. to DEFCON 1, uses Patti's glasses to switch bodies. Kevin the assassin arrives at the bunker and undergoes the same scans to enter; he is confronted by armed agents who are quickly assassinated by Meg, who claims to be in love with God. Kevin kills her, discards his earpiece, and enters the bunker's communications room to speak with Sunday, who in this world is the Australian Prime Minister. Rather than provide Kevin with the song, Sunday questions Kevin's belief in the prophecy altogether; Kevin admits that he does not genuinely believe he can stop the flood. He fights a second wave of security but is captured, then switches back into the President's body.

Patti continues to push Kevin to launch the attack, but he admits that he relishes his repeated visitations to the realm of the undead. Kevin the assassin enters the situation room; neither twin is willing to go through with the Fisher Protocol, prompting Patti to retrieve a copy of Kevin's romance novel (authored by both twins) and have the President read it. The novel appears to be a sordid reflection on the state of Kevin and Nora's relationship, in which Kevin reflects on his own self-destructive impulses. Once the President finishes reading out a passage, the assassin begs to have the launch key extracted from his heart, so that Kevin can never return to the realm of the undead again. The President uses the key to launch the nuclear strike, and he and Patti go outdoors to watch the missiles as they rain down upon them.

Kevin reawakens in the remains of the Playfords' church and notices that the rainstorm has ended without having caused a flood. Kevin climbs atop the ranch's roof to sit with his father, who asks him, "Now what?"

== Production ==
=== Writing ===
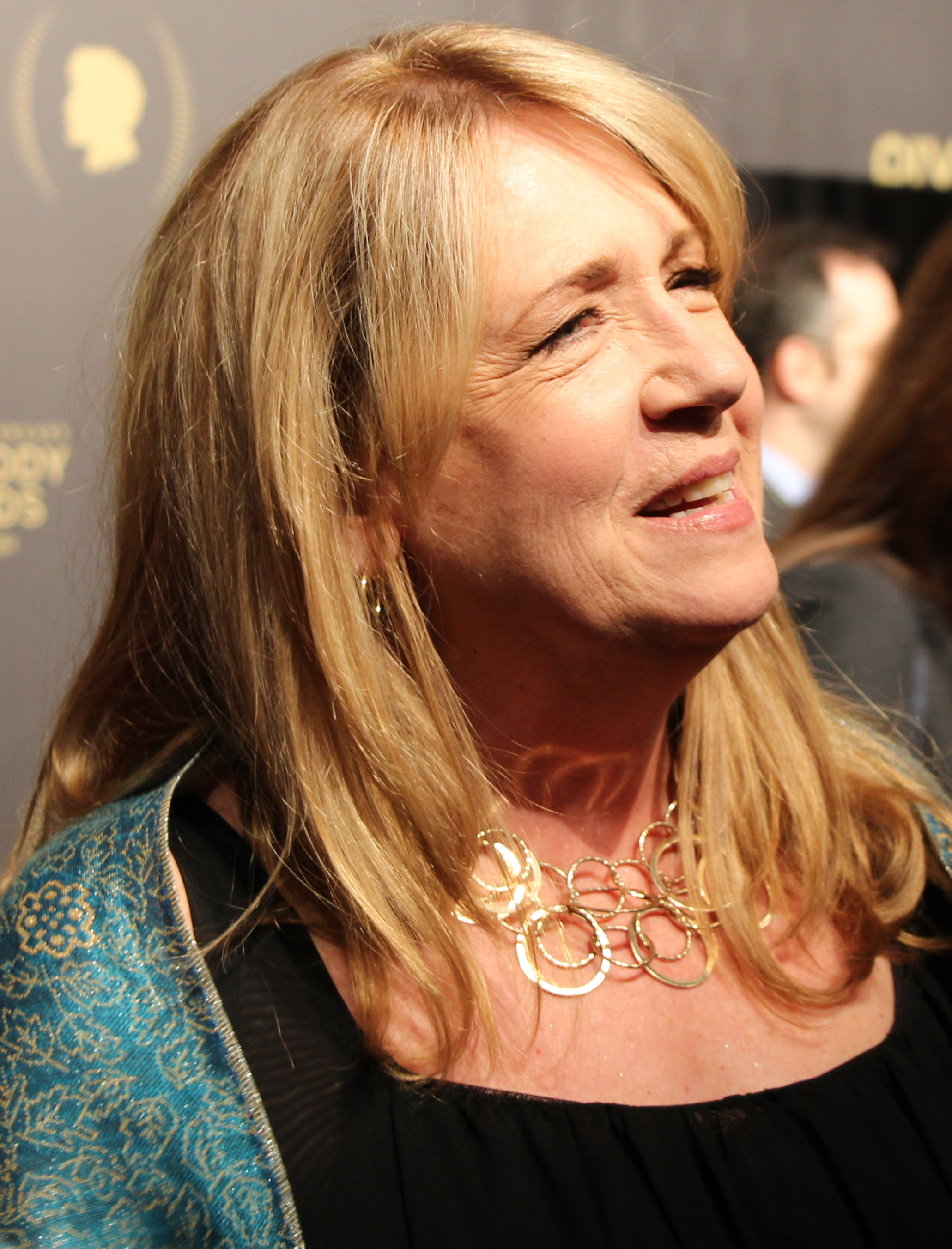
Ann Dowd reprises her role as Patti Levin in the episode.

"The Most Powerful Man in the World (and His Identical Twin Brother)" was approached as a spiritual sequel to the second season's "International Assassin" and featured the same creative team of Lindelof, Cuse and Zobel as writers and director respectively. Cuse and Lindelof set out to craft a premise for the episode that was built more prominently around Kevin's assassin identity, and took influence from popular spy films such as the James Bond and Jason Bourne series. Writer Haley Harris noted that spy sequels often involve a presidential assassination, which became a starting point for "The Most Powerful Man in the World." Lindelof acknowledged that it would be challenging to recapture the "emotional intensity" of "International Assassin," and that the writers opted instead for an "absurdist" approach for the sequel.

The writers also piggybacked off of an ethical question posed to Nora in the episode "G'Day Melbourne" by scientists seeking to replicate the Departure, who asked her whether she would kill an infant so its twin could cure cancer. The scenario became the climax of "The Most Powerful Man in the World" involving Kevin and his twin, who Harris said represented the two sides of Kevin's internal journey - namely, a "lone wolf" (the assassin) and a begrudging family man (the President). Writer Lila Byock, who previously worked as a writer on the period drama Manhattan (which followed the development of the first atomic weapons), suggested that the episode represent Kevin's dilemma by having him cut a nuclear launch key out of his twin's heart. The episode names the procedure the "Fisher Protocol" after Harvard Law School professor Roger Fisher, who proposed the scenario in 1981.

The episode's ending - which reveals that the apocalyptic prophecy associated with the Departure's seventh anniversary was false - represents a key metaphor Lindelof and the writers used in laying the thematic foundation for the third season: the Great Disappointment of 1844 (which was depicted onscreen in the premiere episode, "The Book of Kevin"). The writing team had decided early in production for the third season that the series finale would take place in the aftermath of an anticipated cataclysm that ultimately does not transpire, which Lindelof characterized as a violation of "Chekhov's apocalypse." Lindelof explained, "This show is not about something happening. It's about the anticipation, and then the Great Disappointment. And if we resolve [the idea the world might be ending] in the penultimate episode, the audience will have a full week to deal with the idea that we still have more show. And what we are really interested in — the 'now what?' of it all. What generates apocalyptic thinking is that you don't have to deal with the future."

=== Filming ===
For his dual role as the twin Kevins, Theroux had to keep his beard to film his scenes as the "President," then shave after filming part of the final confrontation between the twins in order to complete the rest of his scenes as the "assassin." He was assisted by a stand-in that the crew used for shots of the back of Kevin's head. The episode features a repeated gag in which Kevin must biometrically scan his penis to enter his presidential bunker. Theroux noted that Lindelof introduced the idea as a joke at his expense after a scene of Kevin jogging in his sweatpants in the first season went viral.

Ann Dowd and Liv Tyler reprise their roles as Patti Levin and Meg Abbott respectively, appearing as members of Kevin's presidential administration in his afterlife scenario following the deaths of their real-world counterparts in previous episodes. They were both credited as series regulars in the episode's opening titles. For its title sequence, the episode reuses Max Richter's opening theme from the series' first season.

== Reception ==
=== Ratings ===
Upon airing, the episode was watched by 0.804 million viewers with an 18-49 rating of 0.3.

=== Critical reception ===
"The Most Powerful Man in the World (and His Identical Twin Brother)" received widespread acclaim from critics, who praised its expansion of the "International Assassin" concept, as well as its humor, emotional depth, and Theroux's performance. On Rotten Tomatoes, the episode has an approval rating of 100% based on 14 reviews, with an average rating of 9.00 out of 10.

Matt Fowler of IGN rated the episode a 9.6 out of 10, calling it "riveting, brain-spiraling, and heartrending." Fowler praised the episode's humor, visuals (especially during the final scenes of Kevin's trip to the afterlife), and attention to detail, and remarked on the series' ability to "shred our souls with some of the strangest, most left-field symbolism." Joshua Alston of The A.V. Club gave the episode an A−, deeming it superior to "International Assassin" for having "the same hypnotic quality" but "with much more urgency." Alston praised Cuse and Lindelof's script for the "unexpectedly absurd elements" of the episode's narrative, and called Dowd and Tyler "terrific" in their reprised roles. He additionally singled out Theroux for praise, stating, "There's probably no greater challenge than playing slightly different versions of the same character, and Theroux excelled at acting opposite himself." Spencer Kornhaber and Sophie Gilbert of The Atlantic likewise praised the heightened stakes of the episode, which the former felt made the episode's afterlife sequences "watchable instead of just weird."

Alan Sepinwall of Uproxx remarked that the episode, in repeating the premise of "International Assassin" a third time, "should come across as rote or mundane... but it never does." Sepinwall called the episode "at once surreal, hilarious, and devastating," praising both its "overflowing" deadpan humor and its layered exploration of Kevin's "profound and inescapable" suicidal depression. Noel Murray of The New York Times characterized the episode as a "wild, tongue-in-cheek political thriller," praising its powerful delivery of Kevin's personal revelation that he wants to repair his relationship with Nora. Murray also particularly praised the episode's opening flashback between Kevin and Nora for emphasizing the couple's "easy interplay." Emily St. James of Vox stated that she found the episode more substantive than "International Assassin", considering the latter entry superior, and that the episode gave her a "new appreciation of everything Theroux does to make The Leftovers work." Caroline Framke, who co-authored the same review, also praised the opening scene for the "effortless" and "electric" chemistry between Theroux and Carrie Coon, and noted that the series' brand of humor allows its characters to be "authentically funny" rather than merely resorting to jokes.

=== Accolades ===
Ann Dowd was nominated for the Primetime Emmy Award for Outstanding Guest Actress in a Drama Series for the episode, earning the series its sole Emmy nomination.
