= You? Me? Us? =

Studio album by Richard Thompson
- Released: April 1996
- Recorded: February 1996
- Studios: The Sound Factory, Los Angeles
- Genre: Folk rock
- Length: 74:01
- Label: Capitol
- Producers: Mitchell Froom, Tchad Blake

Richard Thompson chronology
Live at Crawley (1995)	You? Me? Us? (1996)	Two Letter Words (1996)

Professional ratings
Review scores
Source	Rating
Guitarist	4/5 stars
Encyclopedia of Popular Music	3/5 stars
Rolling Stone	4/5 stars

You? Me? Us? is the ninth studio album by British singer-songwriter Richard Thompson released in April 1996 via Capitol Records. It was Thompson's fourth album for the label, his fifth with Mitchell Froom producing and his second to be nominated for a Grammy Award. Thompson's son from his first marriage (to Linda Thompson) Teddy sings backing vocals on disc 2.

== Music ==
The album is split into two discs. Disc one, Voltage Enhanced, is recorded with a band and is largely electric. Disc two, Nude is largely acoustic with just violin or Danny Thompson's double bass for accompaniment. Two songs, "Razor Dance" and "Hide It Away", are included on both discs. The songs on you? me? us? are notable for the metrical complexity and richness of lyrics and Thompson's guitar work. His acoustic guitar playing is highlighted on the Nude disc. His electric playing is to the fore on "Put It There Pal" and "Bank Vault In Heaven" on the Voltage Enhanced disc.

== Track listing ==
All songs written by Richard Thompson.

Disc 1 – "Voltage Enhanced"

1. "Razor Dance"
2. "She Steers By Lightning"
3. "Dark Hand Over My Heart"
4. "Hide It Away"
5. "Put It There Pal"
6. "Business On You"
7. "No's Not A Word"
8. "Am I Wasting My Love On You?"
9. "Bank Vault In Heaven"
10. "The Ghost Of You Walks"

Disc 2 – "Nude"

1. "Baby Don't Know What To Do With Herself"
2. "She Cut Off Her Long Silken Hair"
3. "Hide It Away"
4. "Burns Supper"
5. "Train Don't Leave"
6. "Cold Kisses"
7. "Sam Jones"
8. "Razor Dance"
9. "Woods Of Darney"

== Personnel ==
- Richard Thompson – guitar, vocals, mandolin, hurdy-gurdy

Additional musicians

- Mitchell Froom – keyboards
- Tchad Blake – guitar
- Simon Nicol – guitar
- Jerry Scheff – bass guitar
- Pete Thomas – drums
- Jim Keltner – drums
- Christine Collister – backing vocals
- Teddy Thompson – backing vocals
- Danny Thompson – double bass
- Suzie Katayama – cello
- Sid Page – violin
