= Certified (The Leftovers) =

- The Leftovers episode
- Episode no.: Season 3 Episode 6
- Directed by: Carl Franklin
- Written by: Patrick Somerville; Carly Wray
- Cinematography by: Robert Humphreys
- Editing by: Michael Ruscio
- Production code: T13.19806
- Original air date: May 21, 2017
- Running time: 58 minutes

Guest appearances
- Lindsay Duncan as Grace Playford; Katja Herbers as Dr. Eden

Episode chronology
← Previous "It's a Matt, Matt, Matt, Matt World"	Next → "The Most Powerful Man in the World (and His Identical Twin Brother)"

"Certified" is the sixth episode of the third season of the American supernatural drama television series The Leftovers, based on the novel of the same name by Tom Perrotta. It is the 26th overall episode of the series and was written by supervising producer Patrick Somerville and co-producer Carly Wray, and directed by Carl Franklin. It was first broadcast on HBO in the United States on May 21, 2017.

In the episode, Laurie arrives at Australia, intending to help Nora and Kevin in their missions.

According to Nielsen Media Research, the episode was seen by an estimated 0.770 million household viewers and gained a 0.3 ratings share among adults aged 18–49. The episode received universal acclaim, with critics praising Amy Brenneman's performance, sense of closure, directing, score, pacing and emotional tone, with some naming it among the series' best episodes.

== Plot ==
=== Flashback ===
Two years after the Departure, Laurie (Amy Brenneman) tends a therapy session for a woman who lost her baby in the Departure. (Note: The woman in the opening scene in "Pilot".) The woman is frustrated that Laurie does not offer advice or treatment, with a distracted Laurie just saying "I don't know". Alone at her house, Laurie decides to commit suicide by ingesting pills, leaving a note behind. However, she changes her mind and throws them up. Seeing GR members outside, she instead puts on white clothing and meets them, wanting to join.

=== Present day ===
Two timelines are intercut: In Australia Laurie meets with Kevin Sr. (Scott Glenn) at his new house, wanting to be present in his plan for Kevin (Justin Theroux). And in flashback we see her earlier experiences with Nora (Carrie Coon) and Matt (Christopher Eccleston).

In flashbacks: Laurie helps Nora and Matt spy on Drs. Eden (Katja Herbers) and Bekker (Victoria Haralabidou) from a van outside their house. Nora and Laurie discuss suicide, with Nora stating that an "accident" while scuba diving would be an easy suicide method. Nora and Laurie have a fight inside the van over Laurie's lighter just as the doctors leave. They decide to follow the doctors to the ocean, where their machine is assembled inside a truck parked in a lot.

Instead of alerting the DSD, Nora wants to enter the machine, determined to be reunited with her family. Laurie protests initially, believing the machine to ultimately be a suicide box, but ultimately accepts Nora's decision. Laurie leaves as Matt stays with Nora for what comes next.

In the present: Laurie arrives with Kevin Sr. and his group as preparations are readied for Kevin's death as they hope to send him back to the land of the dead. John (Kevin Carroll) wants Kevin to meet Evie to tell her she was loved, Grace (Lindsay Duncan) wants to know what happened to her children's shoes and Kevin Sr. wants Kevin to learn Christopher Sunday's chant so that he can use it to prevent the apocalypse when he returns back to life. Laurie talks with John, Michael (Jovan Adepo) and Grace about their plans to drown Kevin and their faith in his return.

While helping prepare dinner, Laurie drugs everyone else's meals, causing Kevin Sr., John, Michael and Grace to fall unconscious. Laurie meets with Kevin, admitting to drugging them as she wanted to talk to him alone before his death, wanting to say goodbye. She confesses that she was pregnant seven years ago, with the baby disappearing during the Departure. (Note: As depicted in "The Garveys at Their Best".) She explains she did not tell him as she they had already raised Tom and Jill and neither parent seemingly wanted another baby, which they both confirmed. While confused at the long-held secret, Kevin understands her decision. He confesses that he is not afraid of dying, and that the last time he was in the land of the dead he felt most alive. Kevin, knowing that Laurie was previously with Nora, asks if Nora is "gone" to which she replies "We're all gone." Laurie goes, leaving her lighter with Kevin, the one Jill gave her as a gift in season one.

Based on the previous discussion with Nora, Laurie decides to go scuba diving despite an incoming storm. Before going in, Jill (Margaret Qualley) and Tom (Chris Zylka) call her about a childhood memory, Jill and Tommy both having seemingly reconciled with Laurie by this point. Laurie ends the call by telling them she loves them, considers whether or not to go through with her plan, then enters the water.

== Production ==
=== Development ===
In March 2017, the episode's title was revealed as "Certified" and it was announced that supervising producer Patrick Somerville and co-producer Carly Wray had written the episode while Carl Franklin had directed it. This was Somerville's fourth writing credit, Wray's first writing credit, and Franklin's fourth directing credit.

== Reception ==
=== Viewers ===
The episode was watched by 0.770 million viewers, earning a 0.3 in the 18-49 rating demographics on the Nielson ratings scale. This means that 0.3 percent of all households with televisions watched the episode. This was a 17% decrease from the previous episode, which was watched by 0.919 million viewers with a 0.4 in the 18-49 demographics.

=== Critical reviews ===
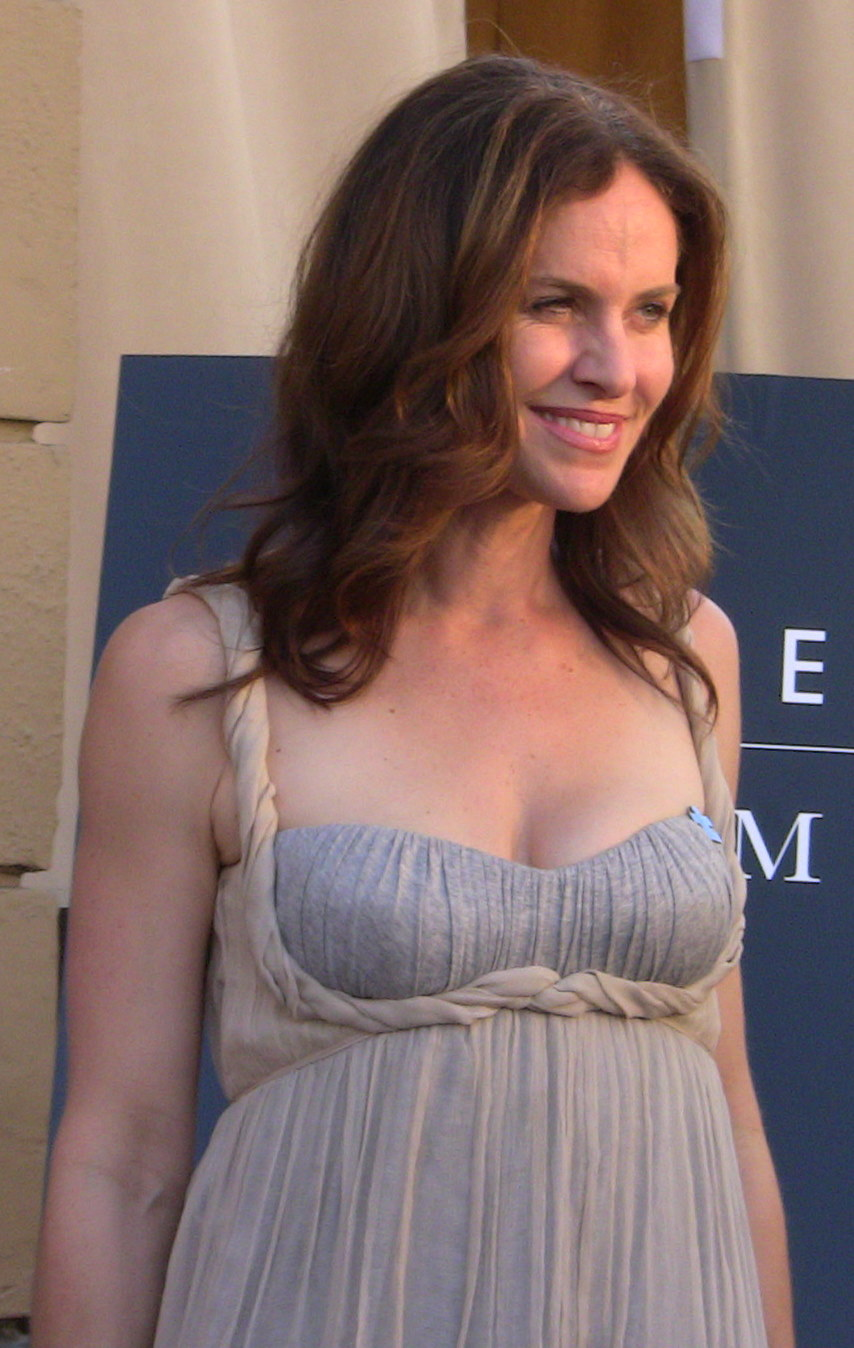
Amy Brenneman's performance in the episode received widespread acclaim from critics.

"Certified" received universal acclaim. The review aggregator website Rotten Tomatoes reported a 100% approval rating with an average rating of 9.77/10 for the episode, based on 17 reviews. The site's consensus states: "'Certified' lays the groundwork for The Leftovers' series finale with a smartly constructed, surprisingly funny episode -- and a poignant farewell."

Matt Fowler of IGN gave the episode a perfect "masterpiece" 10 out of 10 and wrote in his verdict, "'Certified' was, ostensibly, a Laurie-centric episode, featuring a fantastic performance by Amy Brenneman, but instead of pushing her outwards as the show's once self-exiled ghost, it drew her into everyone's lives as she interred her own broken psyche into everyone else's craziness and seemed to find a macabre peace in all of it. A breathtaking chapter that, for the most part, was a sly, devilish comedy."

Joshua Alston of The A.V. Club gave the episode an "A" grade and wrote, "Ultimately, it's the best hour of television in a season that has been full of high points, including last week's Matt-centric lion sex boat murder mystery. Amy Brenneman has delivered amazing work throughout the series, but in season two she ceded the spotlight to Carrie Coon and Regina King, and even Liv Tyler to a certain degree. This episode is the tribute the actress and the character both deserve, and it's replete with beautiful images from director Carl Franklin. This is one of the episodes people will name when they're talking about how wonderful this show was, and almost none of those fond memories will sound like the episodic logline."

Alan Sepinwall of Uproxx wrote, "'Certified' is an enigmatic episode to match its heroine — even the title could be read as either referring specifically to Laurie's dive certification, or to the colloquial term for someone who's mentally ill." Jeff Labrecque of Entertainment Weekly wrote, "In 'Certified', Laurie faces a reckoning. She's built a new life for herself with John, but the cracks caused by the Departure never healed."

Sean T. Collins of Vulture gave the episode a perfect 5 star rating out of 5 and wrote, "What an extraordinary show." Nick Harley of Den of Geek wrote, "Whether her loved ones were able to provide enough meaning for her life remains to be seen, but something tells me Laurie will resurface from the water. The real question is whether or not Kevin will."

Matt Brennan of Paste gave the episode a 9.4 out of 10 wrote, "What she cannot do, with that forlorn glance back at Nora and Matt, or that tearful farewell to Kevin, is shake the fear — the one we all share — that it adds up to much less than she'd hoped, and as such 'Certified' counts as The Leftovers' most sorrowful hour, a headlong dive into one woman's confrontation with meaninglessness itself." Noel Murray of The New York Times wrote, "Kevin Garvey, Jr. and his friends and family - and, possibly, Lindelof and Perrotta - are feeling no small sense of urgency, as well as the impulse to do something significant with the time they have left."

=== Accolades ===
TVLine named Amy Brenneman as an honorable mention as the "Performer of the Week" for the week of May 27, 2017, for her performance in the episode. The site wrote, "Perhaps stupidly, we didn't realize that, when The Leftovers' Laurie said goodbye to ex-husband Kevin in 'Certified', she was doing so as much because she was planning to end her own life as expecting his suicide mission to succeed in killing him. Nonetheless, we were shattered by Amy Brenneman's performance, a master class in subtlety and restraint that only hinted at the emptiness that had for so long haunted her character. At the time we didn't get the full meaning of her reply when he said he wasn't scared of dying: 'Then I'm not scared, either'. But looking back and seeing the weight of Laurie's heartbreaking decision reflected from her portrayer's eyes, we're all the more bowled over by the depth of Brenneman's performance."
