= Mock Tudor (album) =

Studio album by Richard Thompson
- Released: September 1999
- Recorded: November 1998
- Studios: The Sound Factory, Los Angeles; RAK Studios, London
- Genre: British folk rock
- Length: 54:56
- Label: Capitol
- Producers: Tom Rothrock and Rob Schnapf

Richard Thompson chronology
Celtschmerz (1998)	Mock Tudor (1999)	Action Packed (2001)

Professional ratings
Review scores
Source	Rating
The Green Man	(not rated)
The Graham Weekly	(not rated)
Rolling Stone	3.5/5 stars
Encyclopedia of Popular Music	4/5 stars
Allmusic	4.5/5 stars

Mock Tudor is the tenth studio album by Richard Thompson. Released in 1999, it was his final album released by Capitol Records and his last to date for a major record label. Subsequent Thompson studio albums would be self-financed and distributed by smaller independent labels.

For this, his fifth album for Capitol, Thompson teamed up with producers Tom Rothrock and Rob Schnapf, and Mock Tudor had a more straightforward production than his preceding albums on Capitol which had been produced by Mitchell Froom. In this album Thompson draws predominantly on the musical styles of 1960s England—the time and place of his youth. The lyrics have a nostalgic tinge and are rich with allusion to fairy tales and children's books as well as to Shakespeare and T. S. Eliot.

Thematically, Mock Tudor is split into three sections: Metroland—comprising the first five songs, "Cooksferry Queen" to "Hard on Me", Heroes In The Suburbs—covering "Crawl Back (Under My Stone)" through "Walking the Long Miles Home", and concluding with Street Cries And Stage Whispers—encompassing the last three songs (on the original release). "Walking the Long Miles Home" recalls the days of Thompson' youth when he would watch such bands as The Yardbirds at London's Marquee Club but then miss the last tube back to his home in the suburbs.

Although widely regarded by critics and Thompson fans as one of his best works, Mock Tudor did not enjoy much popularity among the public.

== Track listing ==
All songs written by Richard Thompson.

1. "Cooksferry Queen" – 4:14
2. "Sibella" – 4:15
3. "Bathsheba Smiles" – 3:54
4. "Two-Faced Love" – 4:03
5. "Hard on Me" – 5:55
6. "Crawl Back (Under My Stone)" – 3:59
7. "Uninhabited Man" – 4:52
8. "Dry My Tears and Move On" – 3:48
9. "Walking the Long Miles Home" – 4:10
10. "Sights and Sounds of London Town" – 4:54
11. "That's All, Amen, Close the Door" – 5:56
12. "Hope You Like the New Me" – 5:00

Mock Tudor was released on Bong Load Records as a double vinyl LP and with two extra songs.

- "Fully Qualified to Be Your Man"
- "Mr. Rebound"

== Personnel ==
- Richard Thompson – guitar, vocals, mandolin, harmonium, hurdy-gurdy, dulcimer
- Mitchell Froom – keyboards
- Atom Ellis – bass guitar
- Dave Mattacks – drums, percussion
- Judith Owen – backing vocals on "Uninhabited Man" & "Two-Faced Love"
- Danny Thompson – double bass
- Teddy Thompson – guitar and backing vocals
- David McKelsy – harmonica
- Jeff Turmes – baritone saxophone
- Charles Davis – cornet
- Leslie Benedict – trombone
- Randall Aldcroft – trombone
- Larry Hall – cornet
- Joey Waronker – extra drums on "Bathsheba Smiles"
- Alicia Previn a.k.a. Lovely Previn – violin on "Mr. Rebound"
- John Bergamot – percussion on "Mr. Rebound"

Technical

- Tom Rothrock, Rob Schnapf – producers, recordists, mixers
- Dan Thompson – recordist
- Don Tyler – mastering

== See also ==
- Tudor Revival architecture, often called "Mock Tudor"

== Other sources ==
- Richard Thompson – The Biography by Patrick Humphries. Schirmer Books. 0-02-864752-1
- The Great Valerio by Dave Smith
