= Teddy Thompson =

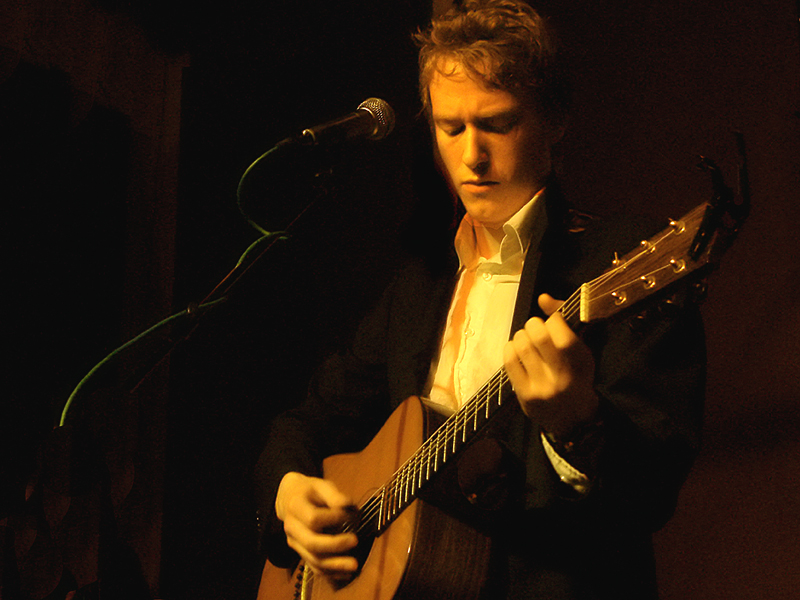

Background information
- Born: 19 February 1976 (age 50)
- Origin: London, England
- Genres: folk, Americana, folk rock, country folk, alt. country
- Years active: 2000–present
- Labels: Cooking Vinyl, Virgin, Verve Forecast
- Website: www.teddythompson.net

Teddy Thompson (born 19 February 1976) is an English folk and rock musician. He is the son of folk rock musicians Richard and Linda Thompson and brother of singer Kamila Thompson. He released his first album in 2000.

== Biography ==
Teddy Thompson was born in 1976 in a London Sufi commune to folk rock musicians Richard and Linda Thompson, both major musical figures in the English folk rock scene from the 1960s onward. He formed a band at the age of 18. He moved to Los Angeles to pursue his music career, which included work as a singer and guitar player in his father Richard's band during the 1990s. He appears on at least three Richard Thompson Band recordings from that time: You? Me? Us?, the live album Celtschmerz (1998) and Mock Tudor (1999), as well as singing a duet on the track "Persuasion", which appeared on Richard's best-of compilation Action Packed (1999). He can be seen performing in his father's band on a number of internet videos from as early as 1993, including an appearance on Jools Holland's show. He coaxed his mother out of retirement and co-produced her first album in 17 years, titled Fashionably Late.

== Discography ==
=== Albums ===
Year	Album	Chart positions				Label
Year	Album	UK	IRE	US Heat	US Country	Label
2000	Teddy Thompson	—	—	—	—	Virgin
2005	Separate Ways	192	—	—	—	Verve; Forecast
2007	Upfront & Down Low	—	—	19	49	Verve; Forecast
2008	A Piece of What You Need	10	63	19	—	Verve; Forecast
2011	Bella	42	94	6	—	Decca / Verve; Forecast
2014	Family (as a member of family project Thompson)	89	—	5	—	Universal Music Group, Fantasy Records and Forecast
2016	Little Windows (with Kelly Jones)	113	78	23	—	Cooking Vinyl
2020	Heartbreaker Please				—	Thirty Tigers
2023	My Love of Country					Chalky Sounds
2023	Once More (with Jenni Muldaur)					Sun
2025	Live at the Rogue Folk Club					none
2026	Never Be the Same					The Royal Potato Family

=== EPs, etc. ===
- LA (EP) (2001)
- Blunderbuss (EP) (2004)

=== Singles ===
- "Everybody Move It" (2005)
- "In My Arms" (2008) – (UK #107)
- "Christmas" (2008) – featuring special guests Linda, Richard, and Kamila Thompson
- "Looking for a Girl" (2011)

=== Guest appearances ===
- 1996 – Richard Thompson's You? Me? Us? – "Bank Vault in Heaven" – vocals
- 1998 – Richard Thompson's Celtschmerz – "A Heart Needs a Home", "Persuasion" – vocals
- 1999 – Richard Thompson's Mock Tudor – guitar, backing vocals, harmony vocals
- 2001 – Richard Thompson Action Packed – "Persuasion" – live duet
- 2002 – Rufus Wainwright's Poses – "One Man Guy"- guitar, harmony vocals
- 2002 – Richard Thompson's Semi-Detached Mock Tudor – dulcimer, guitar, vocals
- 2002 – Linda Thompson's Fashionably Late – co-writer and guest vocals
- 2003 – Rosanne Cash's Rules of Travel – "Three Steps Down" – vocals
- 2005 – Kate & Anna McGarrigle's The McGarrigle Christmas Hour – vocals
- 2006 – Shawn Colvin's These Four Walls – "Let it Slide" – vocals
- 2007 – Linda Thompson's Versatile Heart – co-writer and guest vocals
- 2007 – Rufus Wainwright's Release the Stars – "Tiergarten" – backing vocals
- 2008 – Jason Crigler's The Music of Jason Crigler – "Through Tomorrow", "Dixie" – vocals
- 2008 – Marianne Faithfull's Easy Come, Easy Go – "How Many Worlds" – vocals

=== Compilation/soundtrack contributions ===
- 1998 – Psycho – "Psycho"
- 2002 – Shining Bright: Songs Of Lal & Mike Waterson, various artists – joint vocals (with Linda Thompson) on Evona Darling
- 2006 – Brokeback Mountain – "I Don't Want to Say Goodbye", co-lead "King of the Road" (with Rufus Wainwright)
- 2006 – Q Covered: The Eighties – "Don't Dream It's Over"
- 2006 – Leonard Cohen: I'm Your Man – "The Future", "Tonight Will Be Fine"
- 2006 – Rogue's Gallery: Pirate Ballads, Sea Songs, and Chanteys – "Sally Brown"
- 2013 – Sing Me the Songs: Celebrating the Works of Kate McGarrigle – "Saratoga Summer Song"

== Video ==
- Teddy Thompson Performs on the BPP (live performance on The Bryant Park Project)
