= Mirror Blue =

Studio album by Richard Thompson
- Released: January 1994
- Recorded: January 1993
- Studio: The Sound Factory, Los Angeles and RAK Studios, London
- Genre: Folk rock, alternative rock
- Length: 55:11
- Label: Capitol
- Producer: Mitchell Froom

Richard Thompson chronology
| Watching the Dark (1993) | Mirror Blue (1994) | Live at Crawley (1995) |

Professional ratings
Review scores
| Source | Rating |
|---|---|
| Allmusic | 3/5 stars |
| Encyclopedia of Popular Music | 4/5 stars |

Mirror Blue is the eighth studio album by Richard Thompson, released in 1994.

The follow-up to 1991's successful Rumor and Sigh was recorded in January 1993 with Mitchell Froom once again in the producer’s chair. Despite the increase in sales for his previous two albums, Mirror Blue was held back. The delay was partly due to changes at the top at Capitol Records which saw long time Thompson fan and supporter Hale Milgrim being replaced by Gary Gersh.

When the album was eventually released it did not enjoy the record company support given to Thompson’s previous releases on Capitol.

Critical response to the album was centered on the production, especially the unusual treatment of the drums.

Thompson: "I thought it was a sort of deconstruction of the rock rhythm section... It was a radical record – and a brave record – it was off the back of the records Mitchell had done with Suzanne Vega and Los Lobos and the couple of records [engineer] Tchad Blake had done with Tom Waits. All of which I thought were terrific records and they all had a kind of character to them – a sound that was really trying to strip away some clichés, like why have a snare drum, why the backbeat? And just looking at the song and seeing what does the song need, what’s going to work?"

Despite the critical backlash and the poor sales, some of the songs on the album have become concert staples and favourites of Thompson’s fans. In particular "Beeswing" – a tale about a travelling girl and the prices that she and the young man who falls in love with her pay for the choices they make – has come to be regarded as one of Thompson’s very best compositions. He revealed in his autobiography “Beeswing: Finding My Way and Losing My Voice” that the female protagonist is based on the English folksinger Anne Briggs, whom Thompson did not know personally but had heard many stories of from their mutual close friend Sandy Denny.

On March 10, 2009, "The Way That It Shows" was released as a downloadable song for the video game Rock Band 2.

Guitar World placed Mirror Blue at number 40 in their "Superunknown: 50 Iconic Albums That Defined 1994" list.

== Track listing ==
All songs written by Richard Thompson.

1. "For the Sake of Mary" – 4:19
2. "I Can’t Wake Up to Save My Life" – 3:11
3. "MGB-GT" – 3:35
4. "The Way That It Shows" – 6:08
5. "Easy There, Steady Now" – 4:43
6. "King of Bohemia" – 3:42
7. "Shane and Dixie" – 4:05
8. "Mingus Eyes" – 4:47
9. "I Ride in Your Slipstream" – 4:06
10. "Beeswing" – 5:30
11. "Fast Food" – 2:44
12. "Mascara Tears" – 3:36
13. "Taking My Business Elsewhere" – 4:28

== Personnel ==
- Richard Thompson – guitar, vocals, mandolin
- Mitchell Froom – keyboards
- Jerry Scheff – bass guitar, double bass
- Pete Thomas – drums, percussion
- Christine Collister – backing vocals
- Michael Parker – backing vocals
- John Kirkpatrick – accordion, concertinas
- Danny Thompson – double bass on "Easy There, Steady Now"
- Alistair Anderson – concertina, Northumbrian pipes
- Tom McConville – fiddle
- Martin Dunn – flute
- Philip Pickett – shawms
