= Separate Ways (Teddy Thompson album) =

Studio album by Teddy Thompson
- Released: November 7, 2005
- Recorded: New York City
- Genre: Folk rock
- Label: Verve Forecast
- Producer: Brad Albetta, Teddy Thompson

Teddy Thompson chronology
Blunderbuss (2004)	Separate Ways (2005)	Upfront & Down Low (2007)

Professional ratings
Review scores
Source	Rating
Allmusic	link
The Guardian	link
UNCUT	4/5 stars
The Sunday Times	4/5 stars

Separate Ways is the second full-length album by singer-songwriter Teddy Thompson. Along with Thompson's parents Richard and Linda Thompson, the album features contributions by Rufus and Martha Wainwright, Jenni Muldaur, Dave Mattacks, Matt Chamberlain, Smokey Hormel, Tony Trischka, and Garth Hudson (of The Band). The song "Separate Ways" featured in 2008 film 'My Best Friend's Girl'

== Track listing ==
1. "Shine So Bright"
2. "I Should Get Up"
3. "Everybody Move It"
4. "I Wish it Was Over"
5. "Separate Ways"
6. "Sorry to See Me Go"
7. "Altered State"
8. "Think Again"
9. "That's Enough Out of You"
10. "No Way to Be"
11. "You Made It"
12. "Frontlines"
- Hidden Track: "Take a Message to Mary" (by Felice & Boudleaux Bryant) – The Everly Brothers' cover version, featuring Linda Thompson – duet vocal
- iTunes Bonus Track: "Future Unknown"

Produced by Brad Albetta, Teddy Thompson
