= Live at Crawley =

Live album (Official Bootleg) by Richard Thompson
- Released: 1995
- Recorded: 5 September 1993
- Venue: Outside In Festival at the Hawth Centre, Crawley
- Genre: Rock
- Length: 56:12
- Label: Flypaper
- Producer: Derek Dresher

Richard Thompson chronology
Mirror Blue (1994)	Live at Crawley (1995)	You? Me? Us? (1996)

Professional ratings
Review scores
Source	Rating
AllMusic	3/5 stars

Live at Crawley is a live album by Richard Thompson recorded in 1993 and released in 1995.

Thompson is a widely bootlegged artist. He is vociferous in his opposition to bootlegs on the grounds that not only does the artist not gain by them, but that they also deprive the artist of control over the quality of his output.

Recognising that the people who buy bootlegs are mostly fans and completists looking for additional material, Thompson decided to start marketing additional live and archival recordings that would provide a better quality alternative to the bootlegs, which would be approved by him and which would provide an additional revenue stream. He negotiated with his then record label Capitol to be allowed to distribute 'not for retail' discs at shows and via mail order. Live at Crawley is the first of these "authorised bootlegs".

Thompson had appeared with the double bass player and now-regular collaborator Danny Thompson at the Crawley Jazz Festival in 1993. Their performance had been broadcast by the BBC and, ironically, was available as a bootleg shortly thereafter. Four of the songs the duo played were included on the Mirror Blue album that had been recorded, but not yet released.

Live at Crawley was the first official live Thompson release since Small Town Romance in 1984. Richard Thompson and Danny Thompson continued to collaborate in concert and increasingly on record, but this remains the only non-bootleg record of their live work as a duo.

== Track listing ==
All songs written by Richard Thompson; except for "Don't Roll Those Bloodshot Eyes at Me" by Ruth Hall and Hank Penny

1. "Easy There, Steady Now"
2. "Mingus Eyes"
3. "Two Left Feet"
4. "Ghosts In The Wind"
5. "I Feel So Good"
6. "Taking My Business Elsewhere"
7. "Valerie"
8. "Al Bowlly's In Heaven"
9. "MGB-GT"
10. "I Misunderstood"
11. "Don't Roll Those Bloodshot Eyes At Me"

== Personnel ==
- Richard Thompson - guitar, vocals
- Danny Thompson - double bass
