= Versatile Heart =

Studio album by Linda Thompson
- Released: 14 August 2007
- Genre: Folk rock
- Length: 44:09
- Label: Decca
- Producer: Edward Haber; Teddy Thompson

Linda Thompson chronology
Fashionably Late (2002)	Versatile Heart (2007)	Won't Be Long Now (2013)

Versatile Heart is the third studio album by British singer-songwriter Linda Thompson. It was released on 14 August 2007 through Decca Records. It was recorded at various studios throughout New York City and the United Kingdom and was produced by Edward Haber (alongside Linda's son Teddy on certain tracks).

The album consists of originals written by Linda and other members of the Thompson family, alongside two covers. Guests appearing on the album include vocalist Anohni and guitarist Larry Campbell.

Much like her previous album Fashionably Late (2002), Versatile Heart did not find much commercial success but received positive reviews from critics. Linda would follow up the album with Won't Be Long Now in 2013.

== Reception ==
Versatile Heart received positive reviews from critics. Writing for Pitchfork, Joshua Klein gave the album a rating of 7.5 out of 10 and stated the album "exudes class and weepy emotion". The Guardian awarded the album four stars out of five, calling it a "classy comeback". AllMusic called Versatile Heart a "stunning collection of ballads" and praised Linda's "ability to imbue songs of remorse, loss, and frustrated desire with a soulful beauty and an implied state of grace".

== Track listing ==
Versatile Heart
No.	Title	Writer(s)	Length
1.	"Stay Bright"	Teddy Thompson	1:31
2.	"Versatile Heart"	Linda Thompson; T. Thompson	3:25
3.	"The Way I Love You"	L. Thompson; T. Thompson	3:57
4.	"Beauty"	Rufus Wainwright	4:14
5.	"Katy Cruel"	traditional, arranged by L. Thompson and John Doyle	2:21
6.	"Nice Cars"	Kamila Thompson	2:45
7.	"Do Your Best for Rock 'n Roll"	L. Thompson; T. Thompson	4:46
8.	"Day After Tomorrow"	Tom Waits; Kathleen Brennan	5:04
9.	"Blue & Gold"	L. Thompson; T. Thompson	3:02
10.	"Give Me a Sad Song"	L. Thompson; Betsy Cook	3:56
11.	"Go Home"	L. Thompson	4:31
12.	"Whisky, Bob Copper and Me"	L. Thompson	2:50
13.	"Stay Bright"	T. Thompson	1:46
Total length:			44:09

== Personnel ==
"Stay Bright"

- Teddy Thompson – acoustic guitar

"Versatile Heart"

- Linda Thompson – vocals
- Jenni Muldaur – harmony vocals
- David Mansfield – mandolin
- Teddy Thompson – acoustic guitars, production
- Jeff Hill – electric bass
- George Javori – drums, dumbek, tambourine
- Bill Dobrow – shakers
- The Downtown Silver Band

- Steven Bernstein – alto horn, flügelhorn, brass arrangement
- Frank London – alto horn, cornet
- Dan Levine – euphonium, tuba

"The Way I Love You"

- Linda Thompson – vocals
- Martha Wainwright – harmony vocals
- Teddy Thompson – acoustic guitars, piano
- John Kirkpatrick – anglo concertina

"Beauty"

- Linda Thompson – vocals, harmony vocals
- Anohni – vocals
- Maxim Moston – violins
- Antoine Silverman – violin
- David Creswell – viola
- Anja Wood – cello
- Byron Isaacs – double bass
- Rob Moose – nylon string guitar, violins

"Katy Cruel"

- Linda Thompson – vocals, chorus
- John Doyle – acoustic guitar
- John Joe Kelly – bodhrán
- Susan McKeown – chorus
- Janine Nichols – chorus

"Nice Cars"

- Linda Thompson – vocals
- Kamila Thompson – harmony vocals
- David Mansfield – acoustic and electric guitars
- Jeff Hill – electric bass
- George Javori – drums, percussion
- Rob Burger – Hammond organ
- Teddy Thompson – production

"Do Your Best for Rock 'n Roll"

- Linda Thompson – vocals
- David Mansfield – electric guitar
- Teddy Thompson – acoustic guitar, production
- Jeff Hill – double bass
- George Javori – drums

"Day After Tomorrow"

- Linda Thompson – vocals
- Kamila Thompson – harmony vocals
- John Doyle – acoustic guitar

"Blue & Gold"

- Linda Thompson – vocals
- John Doyle – acoustic guitar
- Brad Albetta – double bass
- Teddy Thompson – backing vocals, backing vocal arrangement
- Kamila Thompson – backing vocals
- John Kirkpatrick – button accordion
- Rob Burger – pump organ

"Give Me a Sad Song"

- Linda Thompson – vocals
- Teddy Thompson – acoustic guitar, harmony vocals, production
- David Mansfield – acoustic guitar
- Jeff Hill – electric bass, double bass
- George Javori – drums
- Larry Campbell – fiddle
- James Walbourne – electric guitar

"Go Home"

- Linda Thompson – vocals
- Larry Campbell – acoustic guitar

"Whisky, Bob Copper and Me"

- Linda Thompson – vocals, harmony vocals
- Eliza Carthy – Hohner organetta, harmony vocals
- Martin Carthy – acoustic guitar
- Susan McKeown – harmony vocals
- Round Midnight – barbershop quartet

- Larry Bomback – tenor
- T.J. Carollo – lead
- Wayne Grimmer – baritone
- Jeff Glemboski – bass

"Stay Bright"

- Robert Kirby – string arrangement
- Teddy Thompson – conducting
- The Scorchio Quartet

- Gregor Kitzis – violin
- Paul Woodiel – violin
- Martha Mooke – viola
- Leah Coloff – cello
