= Zak Hobbs =

British recording artist; singer, songwriter, guitarist

- Born: London, England
- Genres: Folk rock
- Occupations: Singer; songwriter; musician
- Instruments: Guitar; mandolin; vocals
- Labels: Fantasy Records; Concord Music
- Member of: Thompson
- Family: Richard Thompson (grandfather); Linda Thompson (grandmother); Teddy Thompson (uncle); Kami Thompson (aunt)
- Website: zakhobbs.com

Zak Hobbs is an English guitarist, songwriter and singer. Born in London, he is the son of Muna Hobbs, the eldest daughter of English musicians Richard and Linda Thompson.

== Career ==
Hobbs was initially influenced heavily by music from the folk music revival of the 1960s and then the 1970s songwriter movement. He has been described as having a "British-accented Melancholy" and has worked alongside artists including Rufus and Martha Wainwright, Emmylou Harris, Martin Carthy, Eliza Carthy and Martin Simpson.

He appears on Family, the debut studio album by folk rock family ensemble Thompson, released by Fantasy Records, part of Concord Music, on 17 November 2014.

Based in the UK, Hobbs works as a solo artist and as a guitarist with The Rails, Sunny Ozell and others. He is an advanced student of Richard Thompson's "hybrid picking technique", and has taught it for the last seven years.

He issued the all acoustic Falling on Deaf Ears E.P. in 2019, described by producer John Chelew as "Singular AND traditional, a tough combo".

In May and June 2024 he was a member of Richard Thompson's UK touring band for the album Ship to Shore. Reviewing the gig at the Bristol Beacon, Bristol, for Louder Than War, Elfyn Griffith said, "Grandson Zak has clearly learnt from the best and compliments well with his own breaks, sparring with gramps on guitar and mandolin."

In July 2024, Hobbs performed at the release concert for Proxy Music, an album of the music of Linda Thompson, at London's Cadogan Hall.
