= Proxy Music =

Studio album by Linda Thompson and various artists
- Released: 21 June 2024
- Studio: Famous Times (Hackney, UK); Figure 8, Studio G, Mission Sound (Brooklyn, New York); Post Electric (Edinburgh, UK); Nest (Los Angeles); Beyond the Beyond, Betrayal, Chez Kenis (London); Moon Zero Two (Reykjavík, Iceland); Acorn (Galax, Virginia); The Congo (Robin Hood's Bay, UK); Unthanks HQ (Northumberland, UK)
- Length: 39:46
- Label: Storysound
- Producer: Teddy Thompson

Linda Thompson chronology
Family (2014)	Proxy Music (2024)

Proxy Music is an album of songs composed by British singer Linda Thompson performed by various artists, released on 21 June 2024 through Storysound Records. The album includes new songs written by Thompson performed by musicians including her daughter Kami, her son Teddy, and her ex-husband Richard Thompson, due to Linda's spasmodic dysphonia, which prevents her from being able to sing. It received positive reviews from critics.

== Title and cover art ==
The album cover is a parody of the cover for Roxy Music's 1972 self-titled debut album, with its title also being a play on that of the band's name, as artists are performing songs composed by Thompson for her by proxy.

== Critical reception ==
Professional ratings
Aggregate scores
Source	Rating
Metacritic	86/100
Review scores
Source	Rating
The Guardian	3/5 stars
Mojo	5/5 stars
MusicOMH	4/5 stars
Pitchfork	7.5/10
Record Collector	4/5 stars
Uncut	9/10

Proxy Music received a score of 86 out of 100 on review aggregator Metacritic based on nine critics' reviews, which the website categorised as "universal acclaim". Record Collector's Nick Dalton found it to be "almost like one of those all-star tribute albums, except that this isn't a trawl through past glories and [Linda] was very much involved in its creation with folk-rocking son Teddy Thompson, who produced. There's an ethereal feel, something that transcends the boundaries of folk, a gentleness yet something more, helped by the guitar of Richard." Mojo called it "a fabulous record" and "a unique kind of Various Artists tribute album" without "a bad one among" its tracks, concluding that it is "in all, delightful".

Uncut felt that "Thompson's writing gives this stellar cast plenty to work with, her wit rising to such meta conceits as 'John Grant', on which John Grant sings of Thompson's fondness for him, and 'Those Damn Roches', on which Teddy Thompson conveys the tempestuousness of musical dynasties – including his (and his mum's) own." John Murphy of MusicOMH wrote that "despite the sad circumstances behind the album, there's a wicked sense of humour snaking through these songs", which he described as "a celebration of one of folk's most talented figures" and "great to hear that Linda Thompson has found her voice again, with a little help from her friends". Andy Cush of Pitchfork found that "the music [...] could fit onto any of those classic '70s records" she made with Richard, "with stately acoustic instrumentation and melodies that wind patiently without flashy pop hooks. Her sensibility as a lyricist is informed by the folk tradition, and she writes often about the sort of heartbreak and regret that also characterized her songs with Richard."

== Track listing ==
Proxy Music track listing
No.	Title	Writer(s)	Performer	Length
1.	"The Solitary Traveller"	Linda Thompson; James Walbourne	Kami Thompson	4:03
2.	"Or Nothing at All"	L. Thompson; Charlie Dore	Martha Wainwright	4:23
3.	"Bonnie Lass"	L. Thompson; Teddy Thompson	The Proclaimers	3:18
4.	"Darling This Will Never Do"	L. Thompson; T. Thompson	Rufus Wainwright	3:10
5.	"I Used to Be So Pretty"	L. Thompson	Ren Harvieu	3:14
6.	"John Grant"	L. Thompson; T. Thompson; John Grant	John Grant	3:41
7.	"Mudlark"	L. Thompson; Walbourne	The Rails	3:18
8.	"Shores of America"	L. Thompson	Dori Freeman	2:51
9.	"That's the Way the Polka Goes"	L. Thompson; Eliza Carthy	Eliza Carthy	3:33
10.	"Three Shaky Ships"	L. Thompson; Richard Thompson	The Unthanks	4:02
11.	"Those Damn Roches"	L. Thompson; T. Thompson	Teddy Thompson	4:13
Total length:				39:46

== Personnel ==
- Kami Thompson – lead and harmony vocals on "The Solitary Traveller", vocals on "Mudlark"
- Teddy Thompson – production; harmony vocals on "The Solitary Traveller"; backing vocals, acoustic guitar, electric guitar, and drum machine on "John Grant"; vocals on "Mudlark" and "Those Damn Roches"
- James Walbourne – acoustic guitar on "The Solitary Traveller", "Mudlark", and "That's the Way the Polka Goes"; bass and keyboards on "The Solitary Traveller"; vocals on "Mudlark"; additional recording on "The Solitary Traveller"
- Kristoffer Sonne – drums on "The Solitary Traveller"
- Martha Wainwright – vocals on "Or Nothing at All"
- Daniel Mintseris – piano on "Or Nothing at All"
- Craig Reid – vocals on "Bonnie Lass", harmony vocals on "Those Damn Roches"
- Charlie Reid – vocals on "Bonnie Lass", harmony vocals on "Those Damn Roches"
- Zak Hobbs – acoustic guitar on "Bonnie Lass" and "Those Damn Roches", electric guitar on "I Used to Be So Pretty" and "Those Damn Roches"; mandolin and harmony vocals on "Those Damn Roches"; additional recording on "I Used to Be So Pretty" and "Those Damn Roches"
- Rob Burger – pump organ on "Bonnie Lass" and "Mudlark"; additional recording on "Bonnie Lass" and "Mudlark"
- Aly Bain – fiddle on "Bonnie Lass"
- Rufus Wainwright – vocals on "Darling This Will Never Do", harmony vocals on "Those Damn Roches"
- Tony Scherr – double bass on "Darling This Will Never Do" and "Those Damn Roches"
- Jacob Mann – piano on "Darling This Will Never Do"
- Kenny Wollesen – drums on "Darling This Will Never Do"
- Doug Wieselman – clarinets, additional recording and clarinet arrangement on "Darling This Will Never Do"
- Ren Harvieu – vocals on "I Used to Be So Pretty"
- Richard Thompson – acoustic guitar, electric guitar, and harmonium on "I Used to Be So Pretty"; harmony vocals on "Those Damn Roches"
- John Grant – vocals, piano, Juno, Kong kit and recording on "John Grant"; harmony vocals on "Those Damn Roches"
- Jeff Hill – electric bass and additional recording on "John Grant"; engineering assistance on "Mudlark"
- Zach Jones – tambourine on "John Grant" and "Those Damn Roches", drums on "John Grant"
- Linda Thompson – vocals on "Mudlark"; production assistance
- Dori Freeman – vocals on "Shores of America", harmony vocals on "Those Damn Roches"
- Nicholas Falk – banjo on "Shores of America"; recording on "Shores of America", additional recording on "Those Damn Roches"
- David Mansfield – fiddle solo on "Shores of America"; additional recording on "Shores of America" and "That's the Way the Polka Goes"
- Chris Carmichael – strings and string arrangement on "Shores of America"
- Eliza Carthy – fiddle, vocals, and body percussion on "That's the Way the Polka Goes"
- Ewan Wardrop – stepping, body percussion, and backing vocals on "That's the Way the Polka Goes"
- Ben Seal – recording on "That's the Way the Polka Goes"; backing vocals on "That's the Way the Polka Goes"
- Rachel Unthank – vocals on "Three Shaky Ships"
- Becky Unthank – vocals on "Three Shaky Ships"
- Adrian McNally – production, mixing, and engineering on "Three Shaky Ships"; piano, Fender Rhodes, keyboards, and drums on "Three Shaky Ships"
- Chris Price – guitars and bass on "Three Shaky Ships"
- Susan McKeown – harmony vocals on "Those Damn Roches"
- Scott Hull – mastering
- James Frazee – mixing on all tracks except "Three Shaky Ships"
- Ed Haber – production assistance, recording on "Mudlark", additional recording on "John Grant"
- Sean Read – recording on "The Solitary Traveller"
- Tony Maimone – recording on "Or Nothing at All"
- Rod Jones – recording on "Bonnie Lass" and "Those Damn Roches"
- Cameron Malcolm – Aly Bain recording on "Bonnie Lass"
- Chris Sorem – recording on "Darling This Will Never Do", additional recording on "Those Damn Roches"
- Oliver Straus – recording on "I Used to Be So Pretty"
- Vishal Nayak – additional recording on "The Solitary Traveller", "Darling This Will Never Do", and "Those Damn Roches"
- Michael France – additional recording on "John Grant" and "Those Damn Roches"
- Phil Cunningham – fiddle arrangement on "Bonnie Lass"
- Daniel Herbert – engineering assistance on "Bonnie Lass" and "Those Damn Roches"
- Sean James – photography, art direction, hair, make-up
- Isauro Cummins – photo assistance
- Inna Lievak – photo retouch

== Charts ==
Chart performance for Proxy Music
Chart (2024)	Peak position
Scottish Albums (OCC)	19
UK Album Downloads (OCC)	72
UK Independent Albums (OCC)	6
