= Dreams Fly Away: A History of Linda Thompson =

Compilation album by Linda Thompson
- Released: 2 July 1996
- Recorded: 1972–7 February 1996
- Genre: Folk rock; pop
- Length: 77:31
- Label: Hannibal

Linda Thompson chronology
One Clear Moment (1985)	Dreams Fly Away: A History of Linda Thompson (1996)	Fashionably Late (2002)

Dreams Fly Away: A History of Linda Thompson is a compilation by British singer-songwriter Linda Thompson. It was released in 1996 through Hannibal Records. The album collects tracks from her solo album One Clear Moment (1985) and albums recorded as a duo with her former husband Richard, alongside live tracks, demos, and more.

== Reception ==
Dreams Fly Away received positive reviews from critics. David Browne of Entertainment Weekly gave the compilation an 'A' rating and stated that "Linda Thompson's wood-grained, downtrodden voice on Dreams Fly Away perfectly captures life’s aches and burdens". Trouser Press called the album "superlative" and credited it with rekindling her career.

In a retrospective review for AllMusic, Brett Hartenbach awarded the album four-and-a-half out of five stars, calling it "a terrific introduction to one of the great female voices in popular music."

== Track listing ==
Dreams Fly Away
No.	Title	Source	Length
1.	"Lonely Hearts"	Sunnyvista, 1979	5:05
2.	"Walking on a Wire" (alternate version)	previously unreleased	5:11
3.	"I Live Not Where I Love"	Before Your Time…, 1987	5:22
4.	"Sometimes it Happens"	previously unreleased	2:05
5.	"For Shame of Doing Wrong"	Pour Down Like Silver, 1975	4:41
6.	"Talking Like a Man" (remix)	"One Clear Moment", 1985	3:21
7.	"Sisters"	Sunnyvista	4:48
8.	"Shay Fan Yan Ley"	The Mysteries, 1984	1:04
9.	"One Clear Moment" (remix)	One Clear Moment, 1985	4:07
10.	"First Light" (demo)	previously unreleased	4:03
11.	"Pavanne" (live)	previously unreleased	5:11
12.	"Many Dreams Must Fly Away" (demo)	previously unreleased	2:42
13.	"I Want to See the Bright Lights Tonight"	I Want to See the Bright Lights Tonight, 1974	3:07
14.	"The Great Valerio" (live)	previously unreleased	5:15
15.	"Insult to Injury" (demo)	previously unreleased	3:43
16.	"The Poor Boy is Taken Away"	Pour Down Like Silver	3:33
17.	"Blackwaterside"	previously unreleased	2:06
18.	"Telling Me Lies"	One Clear Moment	4:21
19.	"I'm a Dreamer"	previously unreleased	4:07
20.	"Dimming of the Day" (alternate version)	previously unreleased	3:39
Total length:			77:31
