= Dori Freeman =

American singer-songwriter

- Origin: Galax, Virginia, United States
- Genres: Country, Americana, old time
- Occupation: Singer-songwriter
- Instrument(s): Singing, acoustic guitar
- Labels: Free Dirt Records
- Website: www.dorifreeman.com

Dori Freeman is an American singer-songwriter based in Galax, Virginia.

== Biography ==
Freeman is from the Appalachian town of Galax, Virginia where she grew up in a musical family. Her father, Scott Freeman, and grandfather, Willard Gayheart, both play music and their family owns the Front Porch Gallery and Frame Shop which is part of The Crooked Road, Virginia's heritage music trail. In late 2014, she sent a Facebook message to Teddy Thompson who liked her music so much he decided to produce her album. Thompson says that it took him "maybe 10 to 12 seconds to realize she's great" and he was struck by her "straight-to-the-heart delivery." The album was funded through Kickstarter and released by Free Dirt Records on February 5, 2016.

Rolling Stone Country called the album "a strong contender for Americana debut of the year" and Jon Pareles, writing in The New York Times, said "the purity of Dori Freeman's voice and the directness of her songwriting reflect not only her Appalachian hometown – Galax, Va. — but also a determined classicism, a rejection of the ways modern country punches itself up for radio and arenas." NPR's Ann Powers said the "debut album shows great range and incredible emotional nuance." NPR also said "it's startling to hear such a fully formed singing and songwriting voice come out of nowhere." Rolling Stone recently included Freeman on their list of "10 New Country Artists You Need To Know: February 2016."

== Influences ==
Freeman has cited Peggy Lee and Rufus Wainwright as major influences. In an interview with The Bluegrass Situation, she mentioned that a common theme in her music is "dealing with relationships and breakups, and wanting to be strong and independent, but also wanting to have a partner through things." Freeman is also heavily influenced by traditional Appalachian music: "I was brought up here and have spent the better part of my adult life here... I think a large part of America has a very specific idea of what Appalachia or bluegrass is. I think people think of this area and they think of hillbillies and being isolated and poverty and things like that. My experience living here is one of meeting genuine, honest people who don't have any affectation and are really proud of their culture. I’m really proud of my culture as a result of that."

== Discography ==
Solo

- Porchlight (2011), self-produced
- Dori Freeman (2016), Free Dirt Records
- Letters Never Read (2017), Blue Hens Music / MRI
- Every Single Star (2019), Blue Hens Music
- Ten Thousand Roses (2021), Blue Hens Music
- Do You Recall (2023), Blue Hens Music

Featured artist

- Sweeten the Distance on Highway Butterfly: The Songs of Neal Casal (2021)
- Shores of America on Linda Thompson's album Proxy Music (2024), StorySound Records
