= Su-a Lee =

South Korean cellist

Su-a Lee 이수아
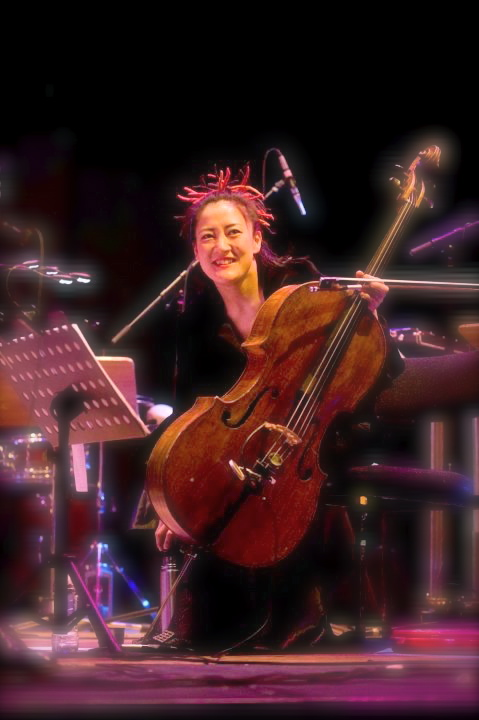

Background information
- Origin: Seoul, South Korea
- Genres: Classical
- Occupation: Musician
- Instruments: Cello, musical saw
- Label: Delphian Records
- Website: www.sualee.com

Su-a Lee is a cellist born in Seoul, South Korea and resident in Scotland. She is known for her wide-ranging collaborations across classical music, contemporary music, Scottish traditional music and jazz.

== Early life and education ==
Lee was born to South Korean parents. She lived in England, Hawaii, and New York before moving to Scotland. She discovered her love of music at eight years old. She began music by playing the violin, but disliked it and changed to the cello.

Lee was given a full scholarship to attend Chetham's School of Music (along with her two sisters Song-a and Hae-a) in Manchester at the age of nine.

In 1988, she was awarded a full-scholarship place to study with the late Harvey Shapiro at the Juilliard School in New York where she graduated with a bachelor's degree in 1992. Lee returned to New York in 2007, to play a recital at Carnegie Hall as part of a piano trio with her sister Songa and pianist Louise Thomas.

== Career ==
Appointed assistant principal cellist in 2003, Lee has been a member of the Scottish Chamber Orchestra since the early 1990s.

In 2009, the SCO made an extensive tour of India, where the Lab group played as soloists alongside the Sarod Maestro, Ustad Amjad Ali Khan. A CD of their collaboration Samaagam was released in May 2011.

Alongside other players in the SCO, Robert McFall (violin), Brian Schiele (viola) and Scottish Ballet's principal bass player Rick Standley, Lee was a founding member of the group Mr McFall's Chamber which was formed to present classical music in new and inventive ways. Mr McFall's Chamber began as a string quartet playing avant-garde classical music in late-night club venues. The group has expanded to include a wide range of performers playing diverse repertoires from cartoon classics, through to progressive rock, jazz and tango nuevo. In 2010, they performed the works of the late Celtic fusion pioneer Martyn Bennett (Lee is also an Associate Member of the Martyn Bennett Trust.) with the album Birds and Beasts, collaborated with Norwegian electronic jazz percussionist Thomas Strønen and worked with the idiosyncratic Dundee poet Michael Marra on the album Michael Marra.

Though Lee spends most of her time playing classical music, she also plays across all art forms and a wide musical spectrum. She enjoys mixing different musical genres within the same program, ranging from "progressive rock, tango, cartoon classics, folk, jazz, early music to contemporary classical." She has played for theatre, dance and film and performs and records regularly with Scotland's jazz and folk luminaries and is also Patron-in-Chief of the Perth Youth Orchestra.

In 2009, she further explored the territory of improvised music, collaborating with painter Alan Kilpatrick to perform an improvised live installation piece at the Fleming Gallery in London Mayfair. In January 2012, Lee performed with former Cream bass player, Jack Bruce with Mr McFall's Chamber at Celtic Connections.

At Celtic Connections 2013, Lee further expanded her musical range, playing at the Old Fruitmarket, Glasgow, with India Alba alongside two classical Indian musicians, Gyan Singh and Sharat Chandra Srivastava and two Scottish musicians; virtuoso on pipes and whistles, Ross Ainslie and renowned instrument maker and performer Nigel Richard. After playing as a guest in the band's line-up at both the Solas and Insider Music Festivals in June 2013, Su-a agreed to a permanent position with the band.

Some musical critics have regarded a number of Lee's projects as "challenging and experimental"; projects "pushing musical and performance boundaries". In April 2012, her musical saw playing came to the attention of Eric Clapton, resulting in a request to record her at British Grove Studios. Lee has performed in countries and venues in both the Northern and Southern hemisphere including some unorthodox and unconventional locations including Japanese temples, circus tents, waterfalls – and even special concerts for babies.

Lee released her debut solo album Dialogues in 2022 on her own label, Sky Child Arts.

== Personal life ==
One of Lee's signatures is the "fleck of colour she frequently adds to her hair."

Lee is married to Hamish Napier, a folk musician.

== Award nominations ==
In 2007, Lee was listed in Scotland on Sunday at number 26 among the fifty most eligible women in Scotland.

== Discography ==
=== with Scottish Chamber Orchestra ===
- Schubert Symphonies Nos. 8 & 9 (1998)
- Beethoven Symphonies 1–9 (2006)
- Hallgrímsson Cello Concertos (2007)
- Mozart Symphonies 38–41 (2008)
- Mozart Sinfonia Concertante (2008)
- Harper: Miracles – The Music of Edward Harper (2008)
- Mozart Symphonies 29, 31 'Paris', 32, 35 'Haffner' and 36 'Linz' (2009)
- Strauss – Ariadne on Naxos/Le Bourgeois Gentilhomme (2010)
- Amjad Ali Khan – Samaagam (2010)
- Weber Wind Concertos (2012)
- Berlioz: Symphonie Fantastique (2012)

=== with Mr McFall's Chamber ===
- Like the Milk (1999)
- Revolucionario (2001)
- Upstart Jugglers (2001)
- Gavin Bryars (2007)
- Newcastle New Music (2009)
- Birds and Beasts (2010)
- Michael Marra (2010)
- The Okavango Macbeth (2011)
- La Pasionaria (2013)

=== with others ===
- Alyth – An Iomall (2000)
- Fraser Anderson – 'and the girl with the strawberry...' (2003)
- Heather MacLeod – "Crossing Tides" (2005)
- Karine Polwart – Scribbled in chalk (2006)
- Andi Neate – Flying Full Circle (2007)
- Eliza Carthy – Dreams of Breathing Underwater (2008)
- Colin Steele – Stramash (2008)
- Andi Neate – Crows, Rooks and Ravens (2008)
- Max Richter – 24 Postcards in Full Colour (2008)
- James Grant – Strange Flowers (2009)
- Fiona J. Mackenzie – Deagh Dheis Aodaich (A Good Suit of Clothes) (2009)
- Michelle Burke – Pulling Threads (2009)
- Lauren MacColl – Strewn with Ribbons (2009)
- Hidden Orchestra – Tru Thoughts (BBC Radio 1, Album of the Month) (2010)
- Isobel Campbell – Hawk (2010)
- Alan Coady and Zoë Moskal – Love Burns (2010)
- Anna-Wendy Stevenson – My Edinburgh (2011)
- Bella Hardy – Songs Lost or Stolen (2011)
- David Ferrard – Journeyman – Album of the Week, BBC Radio Scotland (2011)
- Hidden Orchestra – Archipelago
- Eric Clapton (recorded April 2012) – Musical Saw (2012)
- James Ross – Chasing the Sun (2012)
- Amy Duncan – "Cycles of Life" (2013)

=== Solo ===
- Dialogues (duo recordings with various artists) (2022)
