= Anglicana (album) =

Studio album by Eliza Carthy
- Released: October 27, 2002
- Genre: Folk
- Length: 54:06
- Language: English
- Label: Topic Records
- Producer: Eliza Carthy; Ben Ivitsky

Eliza Carthy chronology
Angels & Cigarettes (2000)	Anglicana (2002)	The Definitive Collection (2003)

Professional ratings
Review scores
Source	Rating
The Guardian	4/5 stars

Anglicana is an album by English folk musician Eliza Carthy. It was the winner of the "Best Album" category of the 2003 BBC Radio 2 Folk Awards, and was nominated for the 2003 Mercury Music Prize, but lost to Dizzee Rascal's Boy in Da Corner.

== Track listing ==
All tracks traditional arr. Eliza Carthy except where noted.

No.	Title	Writer(s)	Length
1.	"Worcester City"		4:45
2.	"Just As the Tide Was Flowing"		7:58
3.	"Limbo"	trad.; arranged by Eliza Carthy and Ben Ivitsky	4:24
4.	"Little Gypsy Girl"		2:08
5.	"No Man's Jig / Hanoverian Dance / Three Jolly Sheepskins"		4:09
6.	"Pretty Ploughboy"		5:19
7.	"Bold Privateer"		7:07
8.	"Dr MCMBE"	Eliza Carthy	5:40
9.	"In London So Fair"		8:06
10.	"Willow Tree"	trad. arranged by Eliza Carthy and Ben Ivitsky	4:30
Total length:			54:06

== Personnel ==
- Eliza Carthy – fiddle, vocals, octave violin (track 2), piano (track 9)
- Barnaby Stradling – acoustic bass (tracks 1, 6, 10)
- John Spiers – melodeon (tracks 1, 5, 6)
- Jon Boden – fiddle (tracks 1, 5, 6)
- Donald MacDougal – guitar (track 1)
- Donald Hay – drums and percussion (tracks 1, 6, 10), hammer and girders (track 6)
- Ben Ivitsky – viola (track 2), guitar (tracks 3, 5), semi-acoustic guitar and trombone (track 10)
- Tim van Eyken – melodeon (track 2), guitar (tracks 2, 7), harmonica (track 5)
- Maria Gilhooley – vocals (track 4)
- Norma Waterson – vocals (track 4)
- Will Duke – concertina (track 4)
- Dan Quinn – melodeon (track 4)
- Tom Salter – electric guitar (track 5)
- Martin Carthy – guitar (track 8)
- Martin Green – piano accordion (track 10)
- Doug Duncan – trumpet (track 10)
- Greg Ivitsky – alto saxophone (track 10)
- Heather Macleod – vocals (track 10)
- Mary Macmaster – vocals (track 10)
