= Won't Be Long Now =

Studio album by Linda Thompson
- Released: 15 October 2013
- Genre: Folk rock
- Length: 41:34
- Label: Pettifer Sounds
- Producer: Edward Haber

Linda Thompson chronology
Versatile Heart (2007)	Won't Be Long Now (2013)	Family (2014)

Won't Be Long Now is the fourth studio album by British singer-songwriter Linda Thompson. It was released on 15 October 2013 through Pettifer Sounds. The album was recorded in various studios across New York City, New Jersey and the United Kingdom. Production was handled by Edward Haber, who had also produced Thompson's previous two albums, Fashionably Late (2002) and Versatile Heart (2007).

Won't Be Long Now received positive reviews from critics. It became Thompson's first album to chart in the UK, where it peaked at number 76.

== Overview ==
As with Linda's previous two albums, many of the songs on Won't Be Long Now are collaborations with the rest of the Thompson family. Many tracks were written with Linda's son Teddy Thompson and ex-husband Richard Thompson appears on the first track, "Love's for Babies and Fools".

"Paddy's Lamentation" was previously recorded by Linda a cappella for the 2002 film Gangs of New York; the version that appears here is a re-recording with Teddy backing on acoustic guitar.

== Reception ==
Won't Be Long Now received positive reviews from critics. Writing for The Guardian, Robin Denselow awarded the album four stars out of five and stated "[Linda] is on remarkably powerful, confident form." In a review for NPR, Ken Tucker praised her vocals as "both strong and delicate" and believed that "there are many times here when [the album] achieves a kind of instant timelessness." AllMusic's Thom Jurek also gave the album a four out-of-five-star rating and called the album "a creative, relaxed triumph, filled with wit, plaintive charm, and emotional poignancy."

Hal Horowitz, writing for American Songwriter stated that despite the album's dark subject matter, Linda's vocals "sound warm and comforting" and called the album "a lovely and uncompromising set perfect for her emotional readings."

== Track listing ==
Won't Be Long Now
No.	Title	Writer(s)	Length
1.	"Love's for Babies and Fools"	Linda Thompson	3:38
2.	"Never Put to Sea Boys"	L. Thompson; John Doyle	3:19
3.	"If I Were a Bluebird"	L. Thompson; Ron Sexsmith	6:49
4.	"As Fast as My Feet"	Anna McGarrigle; Chaim Tannenbaum	3:52
5.	"Father Son Ballad"	Teddy Thompson	3:37
6.	"Nursery Rhyhme of Innocence and Experience"	Charles Causley; Tony Callen	3:28
7.	"Mr. Tams"	L. Thompson; T. Thompson	3:42
8.	"Paddy's Lamentation" (from the motion picture Gangs of New York)	traditional, arranged by L. Thompson, T. Thompson	3:09
9.	"Never the Bride"	L. Thompson; T. Thompson	5:01
10.	"Blue Bleezin' Blind Drunk" (live at The Bottom Line)	Belle Stewart; L. Thompson	2:11
11.	"It Won't Be Long Now"	T. Thompson	2:36
Total length:			41:34
