= Family (Thompson album) =

Studio album by Thompson
- Released: 17 November 2014
- Recorded: 2012–2014
- Studios: The Stable, Grand Street Recording, Famous Times Recording, Chez Cellum, The Velveteen Laboratory, Wombat Recording Company, Bonadonna, Trellis Sound
- Genre: Folk rock
- Length: 41:06
- Labels: Fantasy; Concord Music
- Producer: Teddy Thompson

Thompson chronology
Family (2014)

Teddy Thompson chronology
Bella (2011)	Family (2014)	Little Windows (2016)

Richard Thompson chronology
Acoustic Classics (2014)	Family (2014)	Still (2015)

Linda Thompson chronology
Won't Be Long Now (2013)	Family (2014)	Proxy Music (2024)

Family is the debut studio album by folk rock family ensemble Thompson. It was released by Fantasy Records, part of Concord Music, on 17 November 2014.

== Background ==
Family was conceived by Teddy Thompson when, after he lost his recording contract with Verve Records and came to the end of a serious relationship, he approached his musical family members to contribute to an all-Thompson album. Teddy Thompson states: "I had some kind of mid-life crisis early and was having a real hard time with personal stuff...so I decided to make this record", stating further that "family is really important, and I've missed them". He told Uncut: "I came up with this project to get everyone back together. I was really trying to heal some wounds for myself, but I dragged everyone along with me", stating elsewhere that one of the rules for the album were that "every instrument must be played by a family member".

According to New Yorker magazine, the Thompson family "rival the Wainwright-McGarrigle-Roche clan when it comes to multigenerational musical talent". The musicians involved on this album span three generations and include Teddy Thompson's long separated parents Richard and Linda Thompson, his sister Kami Thompson and her husband James Walbourne (also her bandmate in The Rails) as well as nephew Zak Hobbs and half-brother Jack Thompson (son of Richard Thompson from his second marriage). The band is completed with assistance from Walbourne's brother Rob on drums and Teddy Thompson's eldest sister (and Zak Hobbs' mother) Muna Mascolo, who is not a musician, on backing vocals.

== Writing and recording ==
The various musicians contributed a song or two each as well as playing on each other's material. According to Richard Thompson, the contributions took "two to three years" to compile, with everyone writing their own material and sending files to each other. The album was then worked on throughout 2013 by Teddy Thompson and completed with studio sessions in London and New York afterwards with all the participating family members in attendance.

Various members of the family have commented on the rivalry the album has raised among themselves. Kami Thompson commented on the project: "The whole album is like a family songwriting competition – it's a bloody nightmare. I mean, what could possibly go wrong"? Similarly, Teddy Thompson stated that "the album became something of a family songwriting contest", but conceded elsewhere that "it's not as if we're having family therapy and making everyone pay 12 bucks to hear it". NPR Music comment in an article that "what you get here is a family album in the truest sense of the world, with everyone involved clamoring to be heard while competing for attention with people they love". Richard Thompson gives a metaphorical explanation for Family, stating that the album is "like an enormous cardigan with eight holes for heads (that) you knit everyone into", telling Mojo that "it's fun to do".

Family was released on CD, vinyl, and as a digital download. A deluxe CD was also released which included a DVD containing the short documentary Thompson: The Making of Family.

== Critical reception ==
Professional ratings
Aggregate scores
Source	Rating
Metacritic	75/100
Review scores
Source	Rating
AllMusic	3.5/5 stars
Consequence of Sound	C
The Daily Telegraph	4/5 stars
The Guardian	4/5 stars
Mojo	3/5 stars
The Observer	3/5 stars
Q	5/5 stars
Record Collector	4/5 stars
Uncut	7/10

On the Metacritic website, which aggregates reviews from critics and assigns a normalised rating out of 100, Family received a score of 75, based on 3 mixed and 9 positive reviews. Record Collector called the Thompsons "an astonishingly talented family" in their review, commenting that "most of them have made records of note on their own over the last year or so, but this union is something very special indeed". Q state that "what could have diluted their individual talents instead enhances everyone's reputation" and call Family "the greatest family jam you'll ever hear and an absolutely essential album". The Daily Telegraph write that "there was bound to be a competitive edge but all the various age groups rise to the occasion" and call it "a fine album". The Guardian state that "you wouldn’t want to share a group therapy session with them, but it makes for a musically fabulous and lyrically compelling album" in their review. Uncut write that Family is "a more nuanced guide to the Thompsons’ flawed but just-about functioning dynamic, divorces, remarriages and all", calling the album "dysfunctional but somehow comforting". On a similar theme, Consequence of Sound write in their review of the album that "there is a creative disquiet about it, as much dysfunction as affection" and claim there is an "inevitable lack of cohesion". AllMusic write that "if it doesn't always feel like the dream collaboration between these gifted relations, Family clearly demonstrates what makes them special, individually and collectively". Opinion is divided however, with "the family firm ... clearly in excellent health" according to Mojo who call the album "an unusually harmonious kind of family get-together". The Observer review claims that "inevitably it’s the contributions of the parents who attract most interest" but call it Family "an enjoyable, ramshackle collection". The review at Folk Radio UK states "there can be few if any more talented musical families and the proof is right here".

== Track listing ==
No.	Title	Writer(s)	Length
1.	"Family"	Teddy Thompson	5:14
2.	"One Life at a Time"	Richard Thompson	4:17
3.	"Careful"	Kami Thompson, James Walbourne	3:05
4.	"Bonny Boys"	Linda Thompson, Zak Hobbs	3:20
5.	"Root So Bitter"	Hobbs	3:34
6.	"At the Feet of the Emperor"	Jack Thompson	5:38
7.	"Right"	Teddy Thompson	2:42
8.	"Perhaps We Can Sleep"	Linda Thompson, Teddy Thompson	4:09
9.	"That's Enough"	Richard Thompson	5:04
10.	"I Long for Lonely"	Kami Thompson, Walbourne	4:00

== Personnel ==
Musician	Contributions	Relationship to Teddy Thompson
Teddy Thompson	Acoustic guitar (1 & 7), vocals (1, 2, 3, 4, 7 & 9), bass (2 & 7), pump organ (5, 8 & 9), piano (8), electric guitar (8)	Himself
Richard Thompson	Acoustic guitar (2, 6 & 9), vocals (2 & 9), doumbek (2 & 9), electric guitar (3 & 6), hurdy-gurdy (5)	Father
Linda Thompson	Vocals (1, 4, 8 & 9)	Mother
Kami Thompson	Vocals (3, 9 & 10), acoustic guitar (10)	Younger sister
Zak Hobbs	Acoustic guitar (1, 4 & 5), electric guitar (2 & 3), mandolin (2 & 9), slide guitar (7), vocals (5 & 9)	Nephew (son of Muna)
Jack Thompson	Bass (6)	Younger half-brother (son of Richard Thompson and Nancy Covey)
James Walbourne	Bass (3), acoustic guitar (3 & 10), electric guitar (7 & 9), vocals (9 & 10)	Brother-in-law (husband of Kami)
Rob Walbourne	Drums & percussion (2, 3, 7 & 9), organ (3), vocals (9)	Brother-in-law's brother (brother of James)
Paulina Lis	Vocals (3 & 7)	Sister-in-law (wife of Teddy's older half-brother Jesse, who is Richard Thompson's son with Liz Gordon; Paulina and Jesse have since separated)
Brooke Gengras	Vocals (9)	Brother-in-law's brother's wife (wife of Rob)
Muna Mascalo	Vocals (9)	Older sister
