= The Bunch =

British folk rock band (1971)

The Bunch (Band)
- Genres: Folk rock, British folk rock
- Years active: Late 1971–early1972
- Labels: Island (UK); A&M (US)
- Past members: Sandy Denny; Linda Peters; Trevor Lucas; Richard Thompson; Ian Whiteman; Tony Cox; Pat Donaldson; Ashley Hutchings; Gerry Conway; Dave Mattacks; Roger Ball; Molly Duncan; Michael Berry; Mike Rosen

The Bunch were a British folk rock band, which came together in 1971 to record their one-off album, Rock On.

== Formation ==
The Bunch was put together by Trevor Lucas in late 1971, close to a year after his former band, Fotheringay, had disbanded. He got on board three ex Fotheringay members, Pat Donaldson, Gerry Conway, and his girlfriend Sandy Denny. Denny had just released her debut solo album, The North Star Grassman and the Ravens. Ian Whiteman, who had worked with Denny, and Tony Cox were brought in for piano duties. Richard Thompson joined on guitar, his girlfriend and friend of Denny's, Linda Peters, joined on vocals. Lucas also hired The Dundee Horns (Roger Ball, Molly Duncan, Mike Rosenhe), and ex-Fairport Convention members Ashley Hutchings and Dave Mattacks also joined.

== Album ==
The Bunch recorded an album of 1950s rock and roll and country material from such artists as Chuck Berry, Hank Williams, and The Crickets. Denny, Peters and Thompson took most of the lead vocals and the backing vocal duties for the album, with Pat Donaldson also providing backing vocals. Ashley Hutchings took lead vocals on one track, and Trevor Lucas on two. The music was provided by Thompson (guitar), Lucas (guitar), Donaldson (bass), Cox (piano), Whiteman (piano), Mattacks (drums, congas), Conway (drums) and the Dundee Horns (brass instruments). Recording on the album began in late 1971 and was finished by early 1972, with the album being released in April 1972.

== Afterwards ==
After the album was released, The Dundee Horns formed Average White Band. Denny continued her solo career and recorded her 1972 album Sandy. Whilst the album was being recorded, Thompson recorded and released his first solo album, Henry the Human Fly. Later in the year, he and Peters married. The following year they formed the duo Richard and Linda Thompson. Mattacks re-joined Fairport Convention and in the following year Lucas also joined them.

== Discography ==
=== Albums ===
- 1972, Rock On, Island

=== Singles ===
- 1972, "When Will I Be Loved?", Island

== Members ==
- Sandy Denny - vocals
- Linda Peters - vocals
- Ashley Hutchings - vocals
- Richard Thompson - vocals, guitar
- Trevor Lucas - vocals, 12-string guitar
- Ian Whiteman - piano
- Tony Cox - piano
- Pat Donaldson - bass
- Dave Mattacks - drums and percussion
- Gerry Conway - drums and percussion
- Michael Berry - baritone saxophone

The Dundee Horns

- Roger Ball - alto saxophone, baritone saxophone, saxophone, piano
- Molly Duncan - saxophone
- Mike Rosen - trumpet
