= Fashionably Late (Linda Thompson album) =

Studio album by Linda Thompson
- Released: 30 July 2002
- Genre: Folk
- Length: 42:10
- Label: Rounder
- Producer: Edward Haber

Linda Thompson chronology
Dreams Fly Away: A History of Linda Thompson (1985)	Fashionably Late (2002)	Versatile Heart (2007)

Fashionably Late is the second solo studio album by British singer and songwriter Linda Thompson. It was released on 30 July 2002 through Rounder Records. The album was her first since One Clear Moment (1985).

After the pop stylings of her previous release, Fashionably Late returns to her more familiar folk aesthetic. Guests on the album include Van Dyke Parks and members of the Thompson family, including Teddy, who was a co-writer of five of the album's tracks and the sole writer of a sixth, and Linda's former husband and musical partner Richard, who contributes guitar and backing vocals.

Despite not receiving much commercial success, Fashionably Late was acclaimed by critics as a triumphant return from Thompson. The album's follow-up, Versatile Heart was released five years later in 2007.

== Background ==
Fashionably Late was recorded in numerous studios across both the US and England. After suffering from spasmodic dysphonia for a number of years, Linda eventually was able to recover to the point of being able to record again.

== Reception ==
Fashionably Late received positive reviews from critics. The Guardian awarded the album four out of five stars and praised its songs as "exquisite, gentle, and mostly melancholy". Jim Caligiuri of The Austin Chronicle highlighted Linda's vocals, particularly her duet with her son Teddy on "Evona Darling". In a retrospective review for AllMusic, Thom Jurek also gave the album four stars out of five and stated that "for a woman who literally lost her voice for more than a decade due to a stress disorder, Thompson reveals that she is at full strength as a vocalist, and perhaps more importantly, with this recording she clearly establishes herself as a songwriter as well."

== Track listing ==
Fashionably Late
No.	Title	Writer(s)	Length
1.	"Dear Mary"	Linda Thompson; Teddy Thompson	3:29
2.	"Miss Murray"	L. Thompson; T. Thompson	4:02
3.	"All I See"	T. Thompson	4:38
4.	"Nine Stone Rig"	L. Thompson; T. Thompson	3:13
5.	"No Telling"	L. Thompson	4:59
6.	"Evona Darling"	Lal Waterson	3:18
7.	"The Banks of the Clyde"	L. Thompson	5:38
8.	"Weary Life"	L. Thompson; T. Thompson	3:41
9.	"Paint & Powder Beauty"	L. Thompson; Rufus Wainwright	5:45
10.	"Dear Old Man of Mine"	L. Thompson; T. Thompson	3:25
Total length:			42:10
