= The Rails =

English folk rock duo

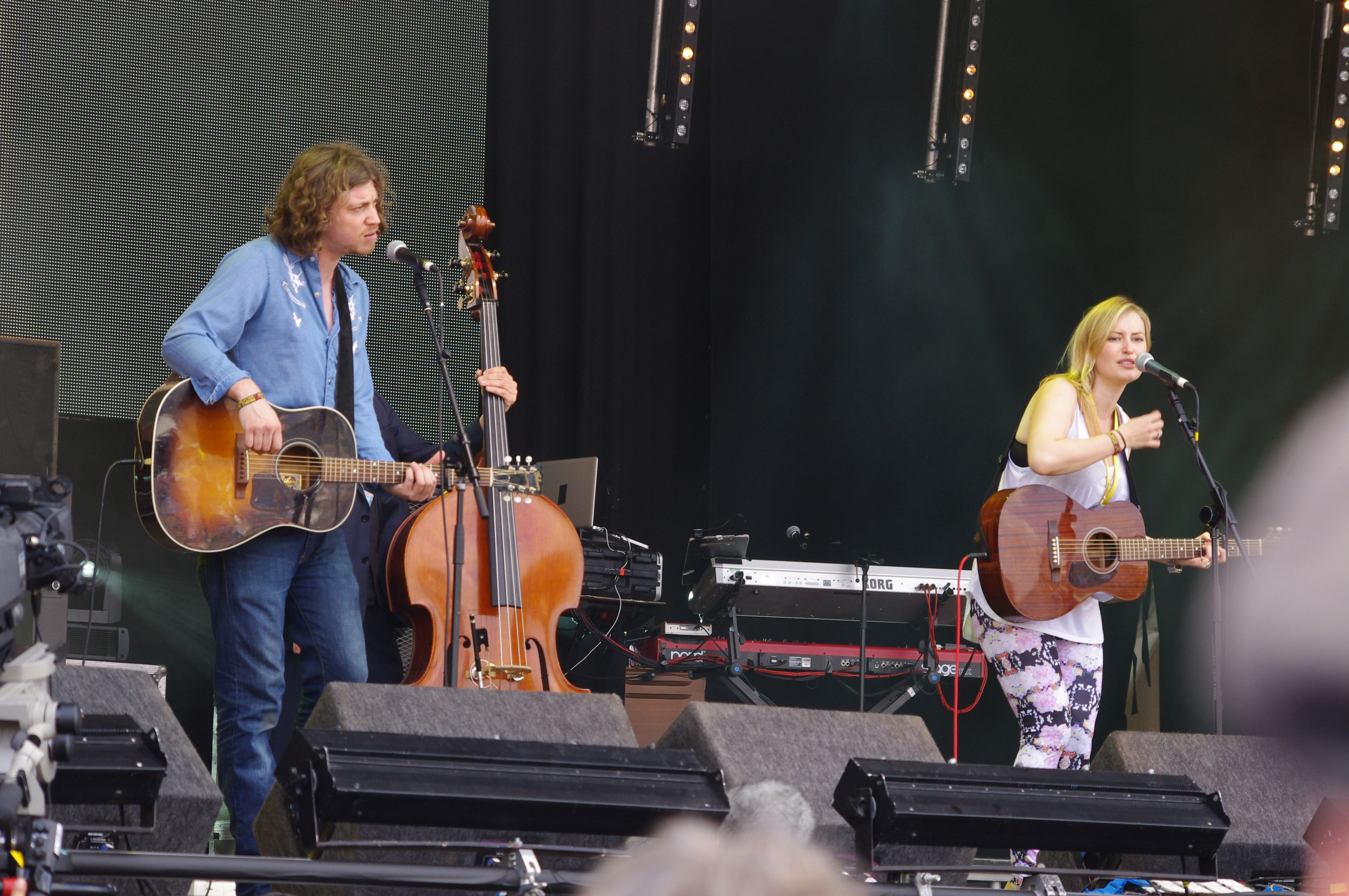
- James Walbourne and Kami Thompson of The Rails at Copredy Festival 2012

Background information
- Genre: Folk rock
- Years active: 2013–present
- Labels: Island Records; Thirty Tigers
- Members: Kami Thompson; James Walbourne
- Website: therailsofficial.com

The Rails is an English folk rock duo from London, England, composed of husband and wife James Walbourne and Kami Thompson. Thompson and Walbourne first met during the recording sessions for Versatile Heart by Thompson's mother Linda Thompson in 2007. The band signed to Island Records in January 2014 and released their debut album on 5 May 2014 on the label's Pink Label imprint, the first band to do so since the 1970s.

== History ==
=== Background ===
Kami Thompson is the daughter of British folk rock singers Richard Thompson and Linda Thompson and her brother is the alternative rock musician Teddy Thompson. Kami Thompson had been in her mother's band as a backing singer and had worked with Sean Lennon and Bonnie "Prince" Billy before issuing a solo album Love Lies in 2011.

James Walbourne is from Muswell Hill in London and has been in various bands, including Peter Bruntnell's band, the Pernice Brothers, Son Volt and The Pretenders, before releasing solo album The Hill in 2010. He has also been a touring member of Ray Davies's band and has played with Uncle Tupelo, Edwyn Collins and The Pogues.

=== Formation (2011–2013) ===
Linda Thompson was recording her solo album Versatile Heart in 2007 which featured Kami Thompson alongside Teddy Thompson. Walbourne appeared on the album after being recommended by the author Nick Hornby and first met Kami Thompson at the session, but the relationship was not developed any further at this time.

They met again by chance in 2011 at the 50th anniversary show for McCabe's Guitar Shop in Los Angeles, this time forming a professional and personal relationship, marrying in October 2012. In the same year they also formed folk rock duo Dead Flamingos and released the Habit EP.

Soon after the band was renamed The Rails and in January 2014 they signed a recording contract with Island Records.

Kami Thompson has been quoted as stating "our long-term goal is to make the perfect divorce album, obviously." This is a humorous reference to the album Shoot Out the Lights, recorded by Richard and Linda Thompson at the end of their relationship, whilst Linda was pregnant with Kami, and considered by many to be a notable break-up album.

=== Fair Warning (2014–2015) ===
On 5 May 2014 The Rails released their debut album Fair Warning which peaked at number 95 on the UK Album Chart. Martin Kelly, the manager of the band, convinced Island Records to resurrect its pink label design for the release of the album. The pink label imprint had previously been used in the 1960s and 1970s on records by prominent folk rock artists such as John Martyn, Nick Drake and Thompson's father's original band Fairport Convention.

The album was co-produced by the band, Scottish musician Edwyn Collins (best known for his work in the band Orange Juice) and Sebastian Lewsley. Many of the songs feature English folk musician Eliza Carthy, herself a member of another large musical family (the Carthy's and the Watersons), playing the fiddle.

All but two of the songs on the album, including three re-recorded tracks from the Dead Flamingos Habit EP, are written by Thompson and Walbourne. The other two songs, "Bonnie Portmore" and "William Taylor", are traditional ballads retrieved by the band from the folk archive at Cecil Sharp House.

The Guardian gave the album 4 out of 5 stars in their review and wrote that The Rails are "a duo to watch". Mojo also gave the album 4 out of 5 stars, writing that the album "rings with the joy of a golden history while also pointing to an exciting future". Folk Radio UK gave the album a positive review stating that "Richard and Linda Thompson established themselves as enduring British folk rock legends...daughter and son-in-law seem highly likely to follow in their footsteps".

Mojo named Fair Warning as their 2014 Folk Album of the Year and it was a runner-up in the fRoots 2014 New Album of the Year list.

In 2015 The Rails performed at the BBC Radio 2 Folk Awards and were presented with the Horizon Award, which is given to the best emerging artist of that year.

Both Thompson and Walbourne appear on the album Family (2014) by the band Thompson (the band being named for all the Thompsons that appear) having written two songs for the project. The album was produced by Teddy Thompson and features Richard and Linda Thompson as well as other related musicians, including Walbourne's brother and Richard Thompson's son from his second marriage. Kami Thompson commented on the project: "The whole album is like a family songwriting competition—it's a bloody nightmare. I mean, what could possibly go wrong"?

=== Other People and Cancel the Sun (2017-2019) ===
The Rails released their second album Other People in 2017 which The Irish Times described as the best British folk/rock album of the year. The album was recorded at Room & Board Studios, Nashville, Tennessee and produced by Ray Kennedy.

The third album, Cancel the Sun, was released in 2019 and produced by Stephen Street in London. The musical style of the album was described by journalist, Michael Hann as "Anglicana – music that might originate in America, but is clearly and resolutely English".

In 2024, the band made a guest appearance on Linda Thompson's album Proxy Music, an album of songs written by Linda Thompson and performed by a range of musicians due to Linda's spasmodic dysphonia, which prevents her from being able to sing.

== Influences and musical style ==
The Rails have been called folk, folk rock and folk pop by music writers.

AllMusic write about The Rail's "classic folk-rock pageantry" and feel that their music "blends bits of Celtic, soul, blues, and folk so agelessly that it could belong in 1974 or 2014". Similarly, Mojo write that "anyone else debuting in 2014 with an album of early '70s-style folk should likely get short thrift from people" but feel the band have the "proper pedigree", going so far as to state that Walbourne's guitar "is as immaculately understated as, well, his father-in-law". Walbourne has been described by the author Nick Hornby as "an unearthly cross between James Burton, Peter Green, and Richard Thompson", describing guitar solos that "drop the jaw, stop the heart, and smack the gob, all at the same time".

The band aspire for a simple sound with "no tricks" where "you can hear everything", adding that "it's hard to convince people to make a record like that now but the sound is fantastic, it's so direct." Walbourne grew up with "a fascination for early rock 'n' roll and roots Americana and was exposed to the music of Frank Sinatra and Bo Diddley by his father. Regarding the legacy of her parents' music, Thompson admits that folk music was formative for her and states that "at the time folk was a box I didn't want to be in, and I did my best to avoid it". The Rails decided that "it made more sense to embrace tradition than fight it" acknowledging that comparisons would be made to Richard and Linda Thompson by making a folk-rock record and releasing it on Island Records.

== Members ==
- Kami Thompson – vocals, acoustic guitar
- James Walbourne – vocals, acoustic guitar, electric guitar, organ, accordion, dobro, mandolin, piano, lap steel, Wurlitzer electric piano

Guest musicians

- Cody Dickinson – drums, percussion, washboard
- Danny Williams – bass, double bass
- Eliza Carthy – fiddle
- Jim Boquist
- Eric Haywood
- Carwyn Ellis
- Rob Walbourne

== Discography ==
=== Albums ===
- Fair Warning (2014, Island; CD, vinyl, digital download – the album came with the West Heath EP if obtained from Rough Trade)
- Other People (2017, Psychonaut Sounds; CD, vinyl, digital download)
- Cancel the Sun (2019, Psychonaut Sounds)

=== Singles and EPs ===
- 2 EP (2012) – iTunes exclusive
- "Bonnie Portmore" (2014) – Island Records– Record Store Day limited 7" single & digital download
- "Breakneck Speed" (2014) – Island Records – limited 7" single & digital download
- The Mark Radcliffe Folk Sessions (2014) – digital download only
- Australia (2015) – limited edition seven track EP

== Awards ==
=== BBC Radio 2 Folk Awards ===
- 2014: Horizon Award for Best Newcomer – winner

=== Mojo ===
- 2014: Folk Album of the Year – winner
