= Red Rice (album) =

Studio album by Eliza Carthy
- Released: 1998
- Studio: Panda Sound, Robin Hood's Bay, North Yorkshire
- Length: 96:28
- Label: Topic Records

Eliza Carthy chronology
Red Rice (1998)	Angels & Cigarettes (2000)

Professional ratings
Review scores
Source	Rating
AllMusic	4/5 stars
The Sydney Morning Herald	4/5 stars

Red Rice is a double album by English folk musician Eliza Carthy, released in 1998. It was a nominee for the 1998 Mercury Music Prize.

It was subsequently released as two separate albums.

== Critical reception ==
The Chicago Reader called Carthy "a great instrumentalist and an expressive singer who can straddle the generational divide with soul and beauty." The Sydney Morning Herald deemed the album the "cutting edge of contemporary English folk music."

AllMusic wrote that "Red is electric folk-fusion mixed with modern modes, while Rice uses more traditional means with subtler modernization."

== Track listing ==
Red

1. "Accordion Song" - 4:50
2. "10,000 Miles" - 3:04
3. "Billy Boy/The Widdow's Wedding" - 5:04
4. "Tim in the Sun" - 3:28
5. "Stumbling On" - 3:39
6. "Stingo/Stacking Reel" - 6:13
7. "Greenwood Laddie/Mrs Capron's Reel/Tune" - 6:02
8. "Walk Away" - 3:35
9. "Adieu, Adieu" - 4:34
10. "Russia (Call Waiting)" - 5:56
11. "Red Rice" - 4:22

Rice

1. "Blow the Winds / The Game of Draughts" - 7:50
2. "The Snow It Melts the Soonest" - 3:29
3. "Picking Up Sticks / The Old Mole / Felton Lonnin / Kingston Girls" - 4:50
4. "Miller and the Lass" - 4:40
5. "Herring Song" - 4:40
6. "Mons Meg" - 5:26
7. "Tuesday Morning" - 2:55
8. "Haddock and Chips" - 2:44
9. "The Americans Have Stolen My True Love Away" - 4:48
10. "Zycanthos Jig / Tommy's Foot / Quebecois" - 6:15
11. "The Sweetness of Mary / Holwell Hornpipe / Swedish" - 6:44
12. "Benjamin Bowmaneer" - 4:23
13. "Commodore Moore / The Black Dance / A Andy O" - 3.36
