= His Lordship =

His Lordship may refer to:

- His Lordship (1932 film), a British musical comedy film
- His Lordship (1936 film), a British drama film

== See also ==
- Lordship (disambiguation)
- Style (form of address)
