= Dreams of Breathing Underwater =

Studio album by Eliza Carthy
- Released: 2008
- Genre: Folk
- Length: 46:13
- Label: Topic Records
- Producer: Ben Ivitsky and Eliza Carthy

Eliza Carthy chronology
Rough Music (2005)	Dreams of Breathing Underwater (2008)	Neptune (2011)

Professional ratings
Review scores
Source	Rating
AllMusic	4/5 stars
The Guardian	4/5 stars
Slant Magazine	4.5/5 stars

Dreams of Breathing Underwater is a 2008 album by folk singer and violin player Eliza Carthy. It is seen by many as a successor to her 2000 album Angels and Cigarettes.

== Track listing ==
All tracks written by Eliza Carthy and Ben Ivitsky except "Hug You Like a Mountain" (Rory McLeod)

1. "Follow the Dollar" – 3:40
2. "Two Tears" – 4:14
3. "Rows of Angels" – 3:12
4. "Rosalie" – 3:43
5. "Mr Magnifico" – 6:06
6. "Like I Care (Wings)" – 3:28
7. "Lavenders" – 4:19
8. "Little Bigman" – 4:58
9. "Simple Things" – 4:22
10. "Hug You Like a Mountain" – 4:30
11. "Oranges and Sea Salt" – 3:34

== Song details ==
- "Mr. Magnifico" is said to frequent the Holyrood Tavern in Edinburgh.

== Personnel ==
- Eliza Carthy – tenor guitar, singing, violin, octave violin, ukulele, one row melodeon, piano
- Barnaby Stradling – bass guitar
- Willy Molleson – drums, singing, drumtrak machine, vocals, cajon/moog
- Ben Ivitsky – singing, 5-string viola, acoustic and electric guitars, noises, Stylaphone, triangle, percussion, rowing, cajon/moog, trombone, vocals
- Barney Strachan – organetta, singing, drumtrak machine
- John Spiers – melodeon, singing
- Jon Boden – violin, concertina, singing, banjo
- Conrad Ivitsky – double bass, vocals
- Donald Hay – drums, percussion
- Heather Macleod – singing
- Paul Sartin – oboe
- Micky Marr – bass guitar
- Robert McFall – string arrangement, violin
- Claire Sterling – violin
- Brian Schieles – viola
- Su-a Lee – cello
- Tom Lyne – double bass
- Tim Mathew – narrator (on "Mr Magnifico"), violin
- Toby Shippey – trumpet
- Martin Green – piano accordion, keyboards
- Marcus Britton – trumpet
- Tim Lane – trombone
- Olivia Furness – tenor saxophone
- Greg Ivitsky – alto saxophone, vocals
- Sarah Roberts – singing
- Eddi Reader – singing
- Emma Smith – singing
- Gideon Jukes – tuba
- David "Demus" Donnelly – bass guitar
- The Bevvy Sisters – Heather Macleod, Kaela Rowan, Lindsay Black.
