= Lordship (disambiguation) =

Lordship is a territory held by a lord.

Lordship may also refer to:

- Lordship, the office of a British peer of any rank
- Lordship (horse), a New Zealand standardbred racehorse
- Lordship (ward), Hackney, London, England
- Lordship, Connecticut, United States
- Lordship, County Louth, Ireland
- Marcher lordships, a territory in the March between and England and Wales

== See also ==
- Lordship Lane (disambiguation)
