= James Walbourne =

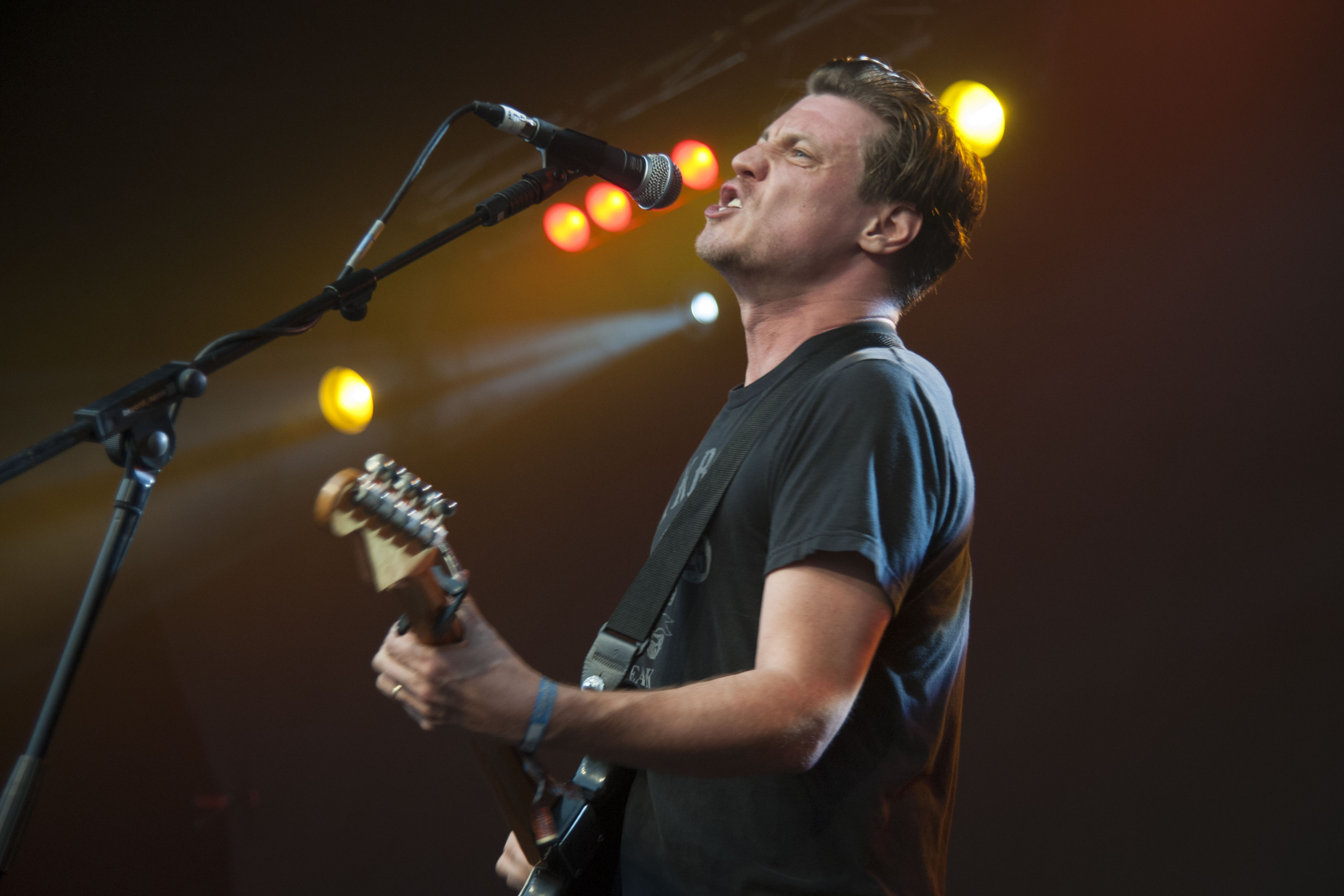
- Walbourne performing with The Rails in 2015

Background information
- Born: James Walbourne; 2 February 1980 (age 46); Muswell Hill, London, England
- Genres: Alternative rock, British folk rock
- Occupations: Musician, singer-songwriter
- Instruments: Vocals, guitar, mandolin, accordion, harmonium, keyboards
- Years active: 1999–present "
- Labels: Capitol; PolyGram; Shout! Factory
- Member of: The Pretenders; The Rails; His Lordship
- Formerly of: Peter Bruntnell; Pernice Brothers; The Pogues
- Website: jameswalbourne.co.uk

James Walbourne (born 2 February 1980) is a British singer, guitarist, and multi-instrumentalist. He is the current lead guitarist in The Pretenders, a member of the duo The Rails, and a member of His Lordship.

== Biography ==
When he was young he wanted to play in clubs around America. To fulfil his dream, he left school to go on a US tour with Peter Bruntnell, and there he became a member of the bands Pernice Brothers and Son Volt. He became a member of The Kinks frontman Ray Davies’s solo band and of The Pogues. In 2008, he was recruited to The Pretenders by Martin Chambers just before the Break Up the Concrete tour.

In 2005 he formed a band, Royal Gun, with his brother Rob Walbourne, but it disbanded after a short tour of England and the US. In 2010, he started working on his first solo album The Hill, released in 2011 by Heavenly Records.

== Family and music ==
In 2007, when Linda Thompson was working on her album Versatile Heart, the author Nick Hornby introduced Walbourne to Thompson where he met Kami Thompson for the first time. In 2011, they accidentally met in Los Angeles at the 50th-anniversary show for McCabe's Guitar Shop and this time their relationship grew and the pair eventually married in 2012.

They founded The Rails and released their first album Fair Warning on Island Records.

== Discography ==
- Peter Bruntnell - Normal For Bridgwater (Slow River Records, Rykodisc, 1999)
- Dust - A Dirt Track Odyssey Bar De Lune LUNECD16 2002
- Peter Bruntnell - Ends Of The Earth (Loose Music, Back Porch, Virgin 2002)
- Death In Vegas - Scorpio Rising Concrete 2002
- Peter Bruntnell - Played Out (Loose Music, 2004)
- Peter Bruntnell - Ghost In A Spitfire (Loose Music, 2005)
- Bap Kennedy – The Big Picture 2005
- Pernice Brothers - Discover A Lovelier You Ashmont Records 2005
- Pernice Brothers - Nobody's Watching Ashmont Records 2005
- Saint Etienne - What Have You Done Today Mervyn Day? (Original Soundtrack Recording)
- Foreign Office 2006
- Pernice Brothers - Live A Little Ashmont Records 2006
- Edwyn Collins - Home Again Heavenly 2007
- Linda Thompson - Versatile Heart Rounder Records 2007
- Pretenders - Break Up The Concrete Shangri-La Music 2008
- Pretenders* - The Best Of / Break Up The Concrete Rhino Records 2009
- Joe Pernice - It Feels So Good When I Stop - Novel Soundtrack One Little Indian, Ashmont
- Records 2009
- Jerry Lee Lewis - Mean Old Man Verve Forecast 2747091 2010
- Pernice Brothers - Goodbye, Killer Ashmont Records ASHM012 2010
- Pretenders - Live In London Strobosonic 2010
- Shane MacGowan & Friends - I Put A Spell On You Independent Records Ltd. 2010
- Peter Bruntnell - Black Mountain U.F.O. (Manhaton Records, 2011)
- Dead Flamingoes - Habit EP AED 2012
- Bap Kennedy - The Sailor's Revenge (2012)
- Linda Thompson - Won't Be Long Now Pettifer Sounds 2013
- James Walbourne - The Hill Heavenly HVNLPC84 UK 2011
- James Walbourne - Drugs And Money EP Heavenly – HVN230CD 2011
- Linda Thompson - Won't Be Long Now Pettifer Sounds 2013
- Edwyn Collins - Understated – AED Records, 2013,
- The Rails - Fair Warning Island Records 2014
- The Rails - West Heath EP Island Records 2014
- The Mark Radcliffe Folk Sessions (The Rails) – digital download only 2014
- Thompson - Family Fantasy 2014
- Jerry Lee Lewis - Rock & Roll Time Vanguard 2014
- Edwyn Collins - Studio Live Session Liechtenstein Society of Sound Music, Real World Records 2014
- Dave Gahan & Soulsavers* - Angels & Ghosts Columbia 2015
- Soulsavers* - Kubrick San Quentin Recordings 2015
- Sarah Cracknell - Red Kite Cherry Red 2015
- The Rails - Australia E.P Rails EP002 2015
- Peter Bruntnell - Nos Da Comrade (Domestico Records, 2016)
- Juliette Lewis - Future Deep No Label (Juliette Lewis Self-Released) 2016
- The Rails - Other People Sony/Psychonaut Sounds 2017
- The Pretenders - Alone/Alive 2017
- Mother’s Little Helper - Live At The Boogaloo 2017
- Peter Bruntnell - Houdini And The Sucker Punch (Domestico Records, 2024)

=== Solo albums ===
Title	Album details
The Hill	· Released: 27 January 2011 · Label: Heavenly

=== Albums with The Rails ===
Title	Album details
Fair Warning	· Released: 2014 · Label: Island Records & Mighty Village
Other People	· Released: 2017 · Label: Psychonaut Sounds
