= The Definitive Collection (Eliza Carthy album) =

The Definitive Collection is a compilation album by Eliza Carthy.

The recordings were made between 1995 and 2002. The tracks are taken from Waterson:Carthy (Waterson:Carthy 1995), Red (Eliza Carthy 1998, three tracks), Eliza Carthy And the Kings of Calicutt (Eliza Carthy 1997, two tracks), Heat, Light and Sound (Eliza Carthy 1996), Common Tongue (Waterson:Carthy 1997), A Dark Light (Waterson: Carthy 2003), Mysterious Day (Oliver Knight 2002) and Shining Bright - The Songs of Lal and Mike Waterson. Issued on CD in 2003. Running time 68 minutes 18 seconds.

== Track listing ==
1. "The Light Dragoon" (Traditional)
2. "Greenwood Laddie" (song)/ "Mrs Capron's Reel" (instrumental)/ "Tune" (instrumental) (Traditional)
3. "Mother, Go Make My Bed"/ "Flower of Swiss Cottage" (Traditional)
4. "Cold, Wet and Rainy Night" (song)/ "The Grand Hornpipe" (instrumental) (Traditional)
5. "Fisher Boy" (Traditional)
6. "Billy Boy" (song)/ "The Widdow's Wedding" (instrumental) (Traditional)
7. "French Stroller" (Traditional)
8. "Stumbling On" (Elaine Waterson, Oliver Knight)
9. "Blow the Winds"/ "The Game of Draughts" (Traditional)
10. "Mons Meg" (Traditional)
11. "Diego's Bold Shore" (Traditional)
12. "Go From My Window" (Traditional)
13. "Child Among the Weeds" (Elaine Waterson)
