= One Clear Moment =

Studio album by Linda Thompson
- Released: 1985
- Genre: Pop
- Length: 39:18
- Label: Warner Bros.
- Producer: Hugh Murphy

Linda Thompson chronology
Shoot Out the Lights (1982)	One Clear Moment (1985)	Dreams Fly Away: A History of Linda Thompson (1996)

Singles from One Clear Moment
- 1. "One Clear Moment" Released: April 1985; 2. "Can't Stop the Girl" Released: 1985

One Clear Moment is the first studio album by British singer-songwriter Linda Thompson. It was released in 1985 through Warner Bros. Records and was Thompson's first release since Shoot Out the Lights (1982), her final album as part of a duo with former husband Richard Thompson.

== Overview ==
Described by AllMusic as a "slick-sounding pop record replete with big drums and electronic keyboards", One Clear Moment marks a departure from the folk-rock stylings of much of Thompson's work both before and after. After the release of the album, Thompson's singing abilities would become affected by spasmodic dysphonia; she would return with the release of Fashionably Late in 2002.

Six of the album's eleven tracks are collaborations between Thompson and American songwriter Betsy Cook. Also included is a rendition of Maurice Ravel's "Les Trois Beaux Oiseaux De Paradis" and a cover of "Just Enough to Keep Me Hanging On", which had previously been a UK top 20 hit for Cliff Richard. The album's final track, "Only a Boy", was written solely by Thompson and appears as a live recording.

== Reception ==
One Clear Moment received generally positive reviews from critics. Sarah Liss of NOW Toronto described it as "critically acclaimed". Kurt Loder, writing for Rolling Stone, wrote that Thompson took "the aching sense of betrayal attendant upon a marital breakup – and fashioned it into a series of sometimes shimmeringly beautiful pop songs." Brett Hartenbach awarded the album four out of five stars, stating that the strength of the material "lifts the album above the somewhat glossy production". He went on to list "Only a Boy" as a highlight of the album and praised Cook's arrangements on the tracks "Can't Stop the Girl" and "Les Trois Beaux Oiseaux De Paradis". Robert Christgau gave the album a "B" rating, praising the lyrics of "Hell, High Water and Heartache" while criticizing Hugh Murphy's production.

In 2002 article for Chicago Reader, Peter Margasak retrospectively described the album as "mediocre".

== Track listing ==
Side one
No.	Title	Writer(s)	Length
1.	"Can't Stop the Girl"	Linda Thompson; Betsy Cook	3:49
2.	"One Clear Moment"	Thompson; Cook	3:55
3.	"Telling Me Lies"	Thompson; Cook	4:22
4.	"In Love with the Flame"	Thompson; Cook	3:51
5.	"Les Trois Beaux Oiseaux De Paradis"	Maurice Ravel	2:21
Total length:			18:18

Side two
No.	Title	Writer(s)	Length
1.	"Take Me on the Subway"	Cook	3:34
2.	"Best of Friends"	Cook	3:47
3.	"Hell, High Water and Heartache"	Thompson; Cook	4:15
4.	"Just Enough to Keep Me Hanging On"	Buddy Mize; Ira Allen	3:23
5.	"Lover Won't You Throw Me a Line"	Thompson; Cook	3:21
6.	"Only a Boy" (Recorded Live)	Thompson	2:40
Total length:			21:00

== Personnel ==
- Linda Thompson – vocals, sleeve concept
- Betsy Cook – keyboards, backing vocals, musical director
- Hugh Murphy – production
- Brian Griffin – photography
- Larry Vigon – design
- Steve Kenis – inner sleeve photography

Principal musicians:

- Jerry Donahue
- Albert Lee
- Liam Genocky
- Gary Twigg
- Stephen Lipson
- Fran Breen
- Chris Baylis
- Kevin Powell
