= Peter Bruntnell =

British singer-songwriter

- Born: 26 January 1962 (age 64); Wellington, New Zealand
- Origin: Kingston upon Thames, England
- Genres: Alternative country, country rock, indie folk, indie rock
- Occupation: Singer-songwriter
- Instruments: Vocals, guitar, harmonica, bass, bouzouki, organ, keyboards, synthesiser, drums
- Years active: 1995–present
- Labels: Almo Sounds, Slow River Records, Rykodisc, Back Porch Records, Loose, Manhaton Records, Domestico Records
- Website: peterbruntnell.co.uk

Peter Bruntnell (born 26 January 1962) is a British singer-songwriter born in Wellington, New Zealand.

== Biography ==
Bruntnell's family is originally from Wales; His family moved to New Zealand when his father, Owen Bruntnell, was sent to work at the British High Commission in Wellington for four years. They returned to the UK when Bruntnell was a year old, and settled in Kingston upon Thames. His great great uncle was Australian politician Albert Bruntnell who emigrated from Wales in 1888. Bruntnell also lived in Vancouver, Canada for a time, which is where he met Bill Ritchie who would go on to become Bruntnell’s songwriting partner.

In the early 1990s, Bruntnell returned to the UK and formed the band Milkwood, although he soon reverted to solo work and recordings with Matt Backer and Felix Harper as the Peter Bruntnell Combination. He was signed by Almo Sounds, who issued his debut album, Cannibal, in 1995., followed in 1997 by his second album, Camelot in Smithereens, working with producer Pete Smith on both records. NME magazine reviewed Cannibal, suggesting that “his records should be taught in schools” and calling him a “tremendous new talent to treasure”, with Music Week describing him as “a hidden gem of the music industry - a real talent”.

Bruntnell moved to Rykodisc / Slow River Records for his 1999 album Normal for Bridgwater. The album was highly recommended by VH1's Bill Flanagan and by Rolling Stone's John Luerssen, helping to establish Bruntnell with American audiences. The album was recorded with the help of musicians from Son Volt, a band with whom he has toured regularly in the United States and continues to collaborate with today.

In 2003 Bruntnell signed to British independent record label Loose in Europe and Back Porch Records in the US for the release of Ends Of The Earth. The following year, Loose released Played Out - a compilation of the first four records, with the songs having been re-recorded as acoustic versions with guitarist James Walbourne. Loose released two further albums - Ghost In A Spitfire in 2005, followed by Peter And The Murder Of Crows in 2008.

Following that, Bruntnell went on to set up his own Domestico Records label, through which he released 2011’s Black Mountain U.F.O., with the Daily Mirror writing in their review, “Too talented to stay the property of an avid cult, his sparky humour and uniquely British perspective are evident in the lushly-attended tunes here”.

In 2013, Loose released Bruntnell's Retrospective album, featuring music from all of his albums to date. The album was preceded by a single and accompanying video of a re-recording of the song "Played Out", featuring Rumer. The Line of Best Fit shared the song, stating that it “showcases just one of the many reasons why Bruntnell is still – after twenty years – one of Britain’s finest songwriters.”

Bruntnell once again joined forces with Loose in 2020 to release a 21st anniversary vinyl edition of Normal For Bridgwater for Record Store Day 2020.

Bruntnell continues to release records through his own Domestico Records, including Nos Da Comrade (2015), King of Madrid (2019), the pandemic-era solo album Journey To The Sun (2021) and most recently, 2024’s Houdini And The Sucker Punch.

== Critical acclaim ==
Bruntnell has consistently received critical acclaim for his work, throughout his career, with journalists frequently referring to him as being underrated and lamenting the fact that he has not achieved wider recognition for his work. His albums are frequently included in Best of Year lists, compiled by both journalists and readers.

The Guardian newspaper wrote an article referring to Bruntnell as a “cult hero” and an “alt-country genius”, describing his catalogue as being “a canon of classically constructed, melodically rich, lyrically ingenious and emotionally, intellectually affecting songs that bears comparison with the all-time greats” and that “as a writer he has few real peers.” Sentiments which have been echoed by numerous publications throughout his career.

== Musical style ==
Bruntnell's music is often referred to as Americana, although it has also been described as country rock, alternative country, psychedelic and indie rock.

== Discography ==
=== Albums ===
- Cannibal (1995), Almo Sounds (as "The Peter Bruntnell Combination")
- Camelot in Smithereens (1997), Almo Sounds
- Normal for Bridgwater (1999), Slow River Records
- Ends of the Earth (2002), Back Porch Records, Loose/Vinyl Junkie
- Played Out (2004), Loose/Vinyl Junkie
- Ghost in a Spitfire (2005), Loose/Vinyl Junkie
- Peter and the Murder of Crows (2008), Loose
- Black Mountain U.F.O. (2011), Manhaton Records
- Ringo Woz Ere (2012), Domestico Records
- Retrospective (2013), Loose
- Nos Da Comrade (2016), Domestico Records
- Live in the Firth (2017), Domestico Records
- King of Madrid (2019), Domestico Records
- Journey To The Sun (2021), Domestico Records
- Houdini and the Sucker Punch (2024), Domestico Records

=== Singles ===
- "I Will, I Won't" (1995), Almo Sounds (as "The Peter Bruntnell Combination")
- "Astronaut" (1996), Almo Sounds (as "The Peter Bruntnell Combination")
- "Have You Seen That Girl Again" (1997), Almo Sounds
- "Camelot in Smithereens" (1997), Almo Sounds
- "Saturday Sam" (1997), Almo Sounds
- "By the Time My Head Gets to Phoenix" (1999), Slow River Records, Rykodisk
- "Played Out (featuring Rumer)" (2013), Loose
