= Lordship Lane =

Lordship Lane may refer to:

In London:

- Lordship Lane, Haringey, north London
- Lordship Lane, Southwark, south London
  - The disused Lordship Lane railway station

Elsewhere:

- Lordship Lane, a street in Cottenham, Cambridgeshire
- Lordship Lane, a street in Frodsham and Helsby, Cheshire
- Lordship Lane, a street in Letchworth and Norton, Hertfordshire
- Lordship Lane, a street in Orston, Nottinghamshire
- Lordship Lane, a street in Selby and Wistow, North Yorkshire
- Lordship Lane, a footpath in Stoke-on-Trent, Staffordshire
