= Eliza Carthy =

English folk musician and singer (born 1975)

Eliza Carthy MBE
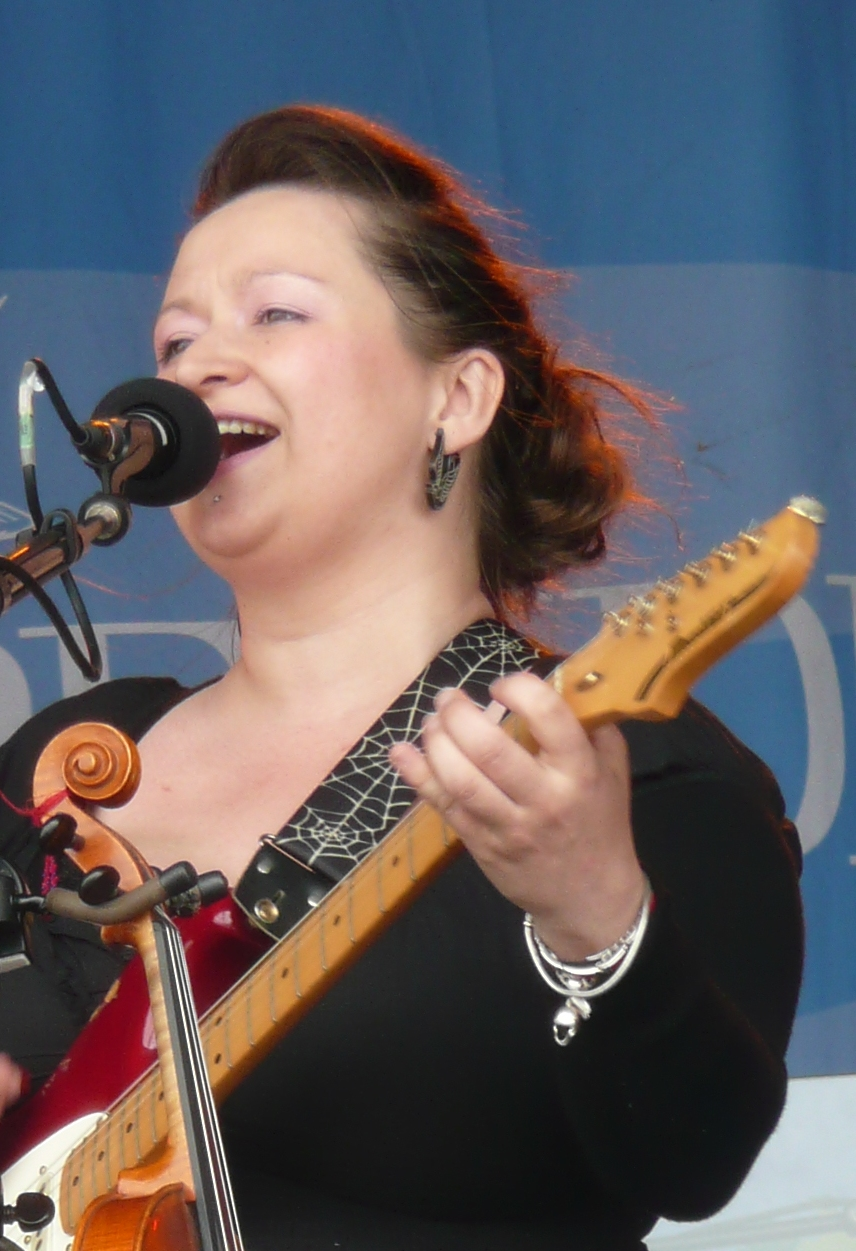
- Carthy on stage at the 2011 Wychwood Festival

Background information
- Born: Eliza Amy Forbes Carthy; 23 August 1975 (age 51); Scarborough, North Yorkshire, England
- Genre: English folk
- Occupations: Musician, singer-songwriter
- Instruments: Vocals, violin, viola, melodeon, piano, guitar, tenor guitar, ukulele
- Years active: 1987–present
- Labels: Mrs Casey Records; Topic Records; Warner Bros. Records; Heroes of Edible Music
- Website: www.eliza-carthy.com
- Parent(s): Martin Carthy and Norma Waterson

Eliza Amy Forbes Carthy, MBE (born 23 August 1975) is an English folk musician known for both singing and playing the fiddle. She is the daughter of English folk musicians Martin Carthy and Norma Waterson. Carthy is recognized as a fiddle-singing pioneer.

== Life and career ==
Carthy was born in Scarborough, North Yorkshire, England. She went to school at Fyling Hall School in North Yorkshire.

She grew up on a family farm along with her maternal aunt and uncle's families who lived adjacent.

At 13, Carthy formed the Waterdaughters with her mother, aunt (Lal Waterson) and cousin Marry Waterson. She has subsequently worked with Nancy Kerr, with her parents as Waterson–Carthy, and as part of the "supergroup" Blue Murder, in addition to her own solo work. When she was 13, Carthy joined the Goathland Plough Stots as a fiddle player. She left school at 17 for a career as a professional touring musician.

She has twice been nominated for the Mercury Music Prize for UK album of the year: in 1998 for Red Rice, and again in 2003 for Anglicana. Carthy was a guest on the album Mermaid Avenue by Billy Bragg and Wilco. Eliza and Billy also recorded together on the song "My Father's Mansions", which appeared on the Pete Seeger tribute album Where Have All The Flowers Gone (1998).

In September 2002, Carthy took part in the tribute concert for Kirsty MacColl, "The Song's the Thing" along with other artists.

In 2003, Carthy swept the boards at the Radio 2 Folk Awards, winning "Folk Singer of the Year", "Best Album" (for Anglicana) and "Best Traditional Track" (for "Worcester City", on the album Anglicana). She was also the first traditional English musician to be nominated for a BBC Radio 3 Award for World Music in the same year (for Anglicana).

In 2004, she was part of Oysterband Big Session, a collaboration with numerous folk artists brought together by Oysterband. They produced an album The Big Session Volume One, and the group as a whole were awarded Best Group at the Folk Awards in 2005. On 29 May 2005, Carthy took part in a tribute to Peggy Seeger at the Queen Elizabeth Hall, London. A double CD Three Score and Ten (2007) contains highlights of the concert.

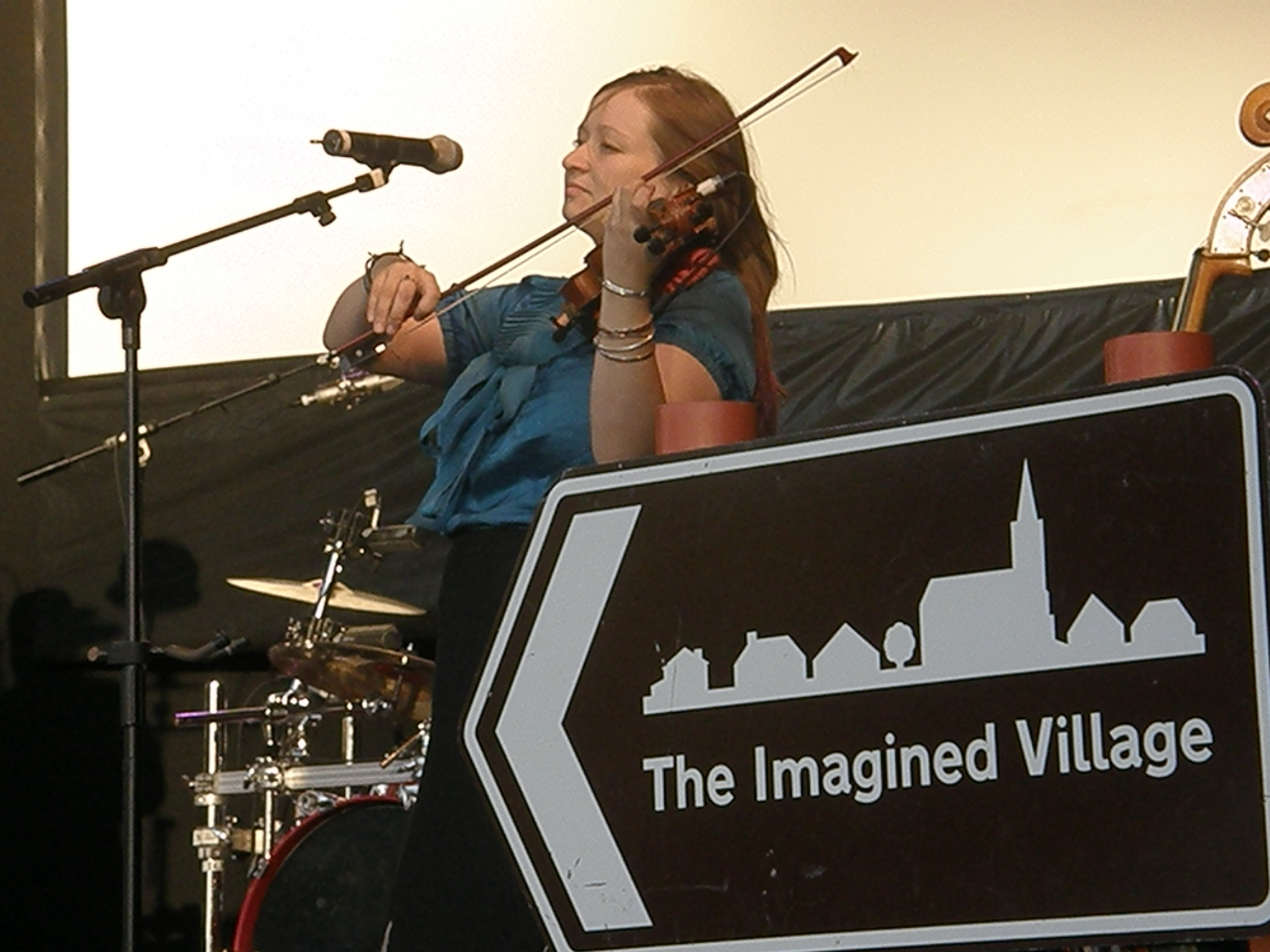
Eliza Carthy performing with The Imagined Village at Camp Bestival – 20 July 2008

In 2006, she contributed three songs (one as lead vocalist, two as backing vocalist) to Rogue's Gallery: Pirate Ballads, Sea Songs, and Chanteys, produced by Hal Willner. Performing as a duo with Richard Thompson, she contributed "The Coo Coo Bird" to a boxed set called The Harry Smith Project (2006), also by Hal Willner. As a duo with Bob Neuwirth, she sang "I Wish I Was a Mole in the Ground" by Bascom Lamar Lunsford on the same boxed set.

Dreams of Breathing Underwater, Carthy's second collection of self-penned songs was released on 23 June 2008. Combining traditional instrumentation with experimental arrangements, and drawing influences from all aspects of her career so far, the album was conceived as the follow-up to 2000s Angels and Cigarettes and was the making for the best part of seven years.

Carthy's 2008 tour was cancelled in November, as a cyst on her throat made singing inconsistent and painful. Because of her pregnancy, doctors delayed treatment until spring 2009.

She became a mother to her son on 24 December 2008, with her Canadian partner Aidan Curran.

The St George's Day Celebrations in Trafalgar Square on 25 April 2009 were opened by Carthy, who performed two songs.

In 2010, Carthy released an album of collaborations with her mother entitled Gift. A BBC reviewer wrote: "The gift in question here, one gathers, is a handing of talent from generation to generation; Norma Waterson and Eliza Carthy are, after all, the sublimely gifted mother and daughter who make up part of British folk's great dynasty." Commenting on the final song, "Shallow Brown", the reviewer noted: "Backed variously by other family members, including Eliza’s father Martin Carthy on guitar as well as her cousin Oliver Knight on electric guitar, vocals and cello, there is a real sense of congregation and rootedness about this song, and indeed this record as a whole. Long may the dynasty flourish."

Her daughter was born on 26 November 2010.

In May 2012, a biography of Eliza Carthy written by Sophie Parkes and titled Wayward Daughter was published by Soundcheck Books.

In 2014, she was awarded the honour of an MBE for services to folk music in the Queen's Birthday Honours. The same year, she also marked the 50th anniversary of Towersey Festival and the 75th anniversary of Topic Records with a celebratory concert at the festival, for which she was musical director. Discussing the event with Folk Radio UK she said: "Me and my family have long been associated with Towersey Festival and Topic Records and I have great affection for both. Towersey gave me my first ever solo gig, as Topic gave me my first ever solo record ..."

== Discography ==
Year	Recording
1996	Heat Light & Sound
1997	Eliza Carthy & The Kings of Calicutt
1998	Red Rice
2000	Angels & Cigarettes
2002	Anglicana
2003	The Definitive Collection
2007	Rough Music
2008	Dreams of Breathing Underwater
2011	Neptune
2013	Wayward Daughter
2017	Eliza Carthy & The Wayward Band: Big Machine
2019	Restitute
2022	Queen of the Whirl
2024	No Wasted Joy

Year	Recording	With
1993	Eliza Carthy & Nancy Kerr	Nancy Kerr
1994	Waterson:Carthy	The Waterson Family
1995	Shape of Scrape	Nancy Kerr
1996	Common Tongue	The Waterson Family
1999	Broken Ground	The Waterson Family
2001	Dinner	Martin Green
2002	On Reflection	Nancy Kerr
2002	No One Stands Alone	The Waterson Family
2002	Shining Bright – The Songs of Lal & Mike Waterson	The Waterson Family
2002	A Dark Light	The Waterson Family
2003	The Definitive Collection compilation	The Waterson Family
2004	Mighty River of Song	The Waterson Family
2004	Fishes and Fine Yellow Sand	The Waterson Family
2005	The Definitive Collection compilation	The Waterson Family
2006	Holy Heathens and the Old Green Man	The Waterson Family
2010	Gift	The Waterson Family
2013	Laylam	Part of Carthy Hardy Farrell Young
2014	The Moral of the Elephant	The Waterson Family
2015	Bottle	Tim Eriksen
2017	Dean Swift's Satyrs for the Very Very Young	Dave Soldier
2018	Anchor	The Waterson Family
2023	Glad Christmas Comes	Jon Boden

Collaborations and guest appearances

- Norma Waterson: Norma Waterson (1996)
- Chipolata 5: 'Skinless' (1996)
- Tim Winton (various artists), music from the novel Dirt Music (one track with Tristan Chipolata and Jock Tyldesley) (1996)
- Billy Bragg & Wilco: Mermaid Avenue (1998)
- Various artists: The Rough Guide to English Roots Music (1998, World Music Network)
- Lal & Norma Waterson: A True Hearted Girl (The Waterdaughters sing one track on the CD reissue 1999)
- Norma Waterson: The Very Thought of You (1999)
- Various Artists: A Tribute to Pete Seeger (Two tracks with Billy Bragg) (199?)
- Billy Bragg & Wilco: Mermaid Avenue Vol. II (2000)
- Norma Waterson: Bright Shiny Morning (2000)
- Roger McGuinn: Treasures From the Folk Den (2001)
- Oliver Knight: Mysterious Day (2002)
- Jools Holland & Friends: Jack O The Green (one track)
- The Big Session Vol. 1 (2004)
- Martin Carthy: Waiting for Angels (2004)
- Paul Weller: Studio 150 (two tracks) (2004)
- Salsa Celtica: El Camino (2006)
- Rogue's Gallery: Pirate Ballads, Sea Songs & Shanteys (2006)
- Rubber Folk (2006)
- The Harry Smith Project: Anthology of American Folk Music Revisited (2006)
- The Imagined Village: The Imagined Village (2007)
- Patrick Wolf: The Bachelor (2009)
- David Rotheray: The Life of Birds (2010)
- The Imagined Village: Empire & Love (2010)
- Marry Waterson & Oliver Knight: The Days That Shaped Me (2011)
- Marry Waterson & Oliver Knight: Hidden (2012)
- Linda Thompson: Won't Be Long Now (2013)
- The Bar-Steward Sons of Val Doonican: Jump Ararnd (2013)
- The Rails: Fair Warning (2014)
- The Bar-Steward Sons of Val Doonican: The Devil Went Darn To Barnsley (2015)
- Songs of Separation: Songs of Separation (2016)
- Scott Doonican from The Bar-Steward Sons of Val Doonican: Prince Ali (2020)
- Eliza Carthy Trio Conversations We've Had Before (2023)

DVDs

- In Search of English Folk Song (1997 BBC film directed by Ken Russell)

Fairport Convention, Donovan, Osibisa, Eliza Carthy, The Albion Band, Waterson–Carthy, Edward II.
Reissued on DVD in 2008, but for Region 1 only

Topic Records 70 year anniversary boxed set Three Score and Ten issued in 2009

Carthy appears a number of times

- Anglicana is one of the albums.
- "Worcester City" from Anglicana is track 11 on the seventh CD.

with Ben Ivitsky

- "Two Tears" from Dreams of Breathing Underwater is track six on the sixth CD.

As part of Waterson–Carthy

- Waterson:Carthy is one of the albums.
- "We Poor Labouring Men" from Broken Ground is track 21 on the sixth CD.
