= Linda Thompson (singer) =

British singer-songwriter (born 1947)

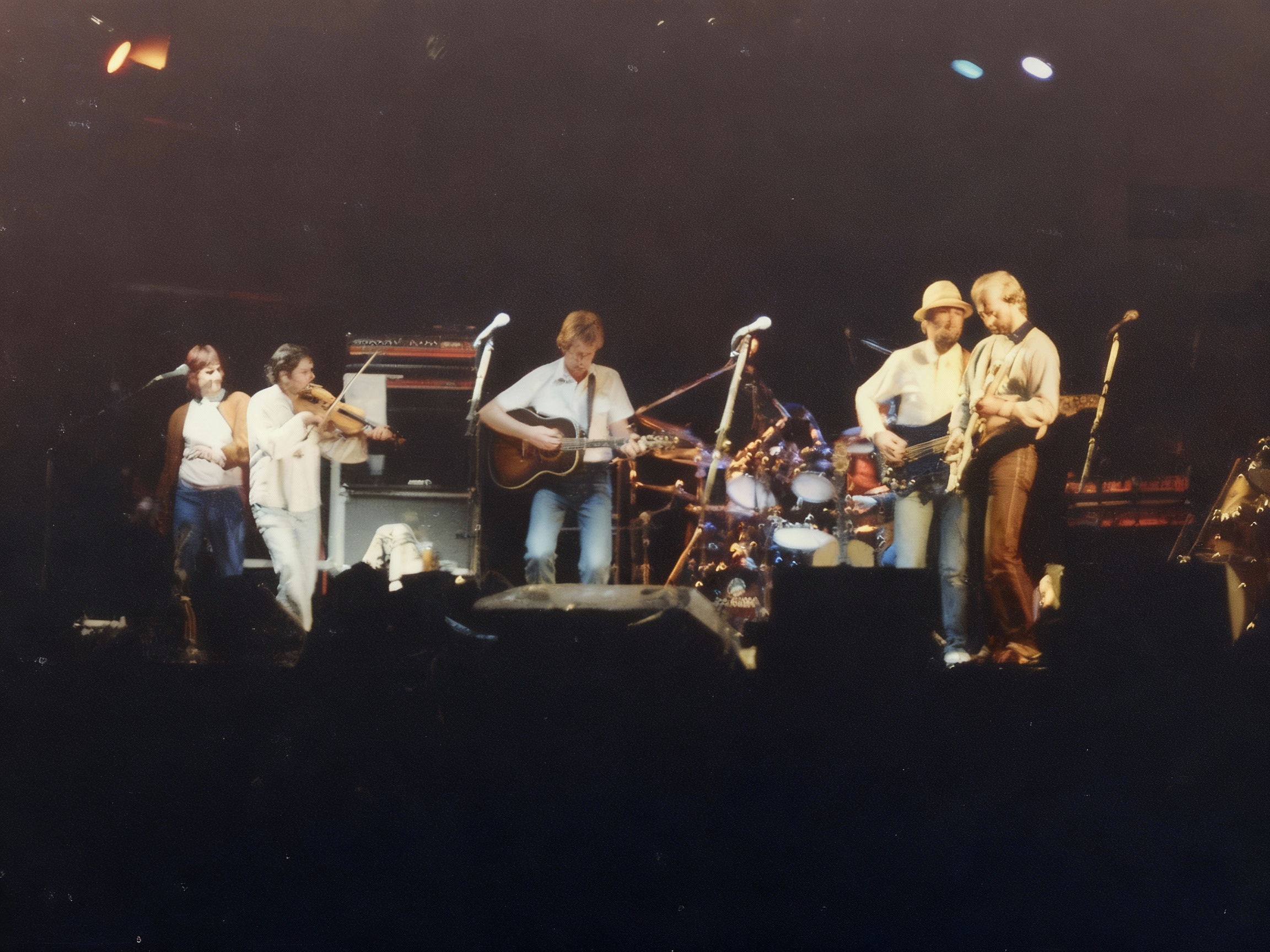
- Linda Thompson (first from left) performing with Fairport Convention in 1982

Background information
- Also known as: Linda Peters
- Born: Linda Pettifer; 23 August 1947 (age 79); Hackney, London, England
- Genres: Folk rock; folk
- Occupations: Singer; songwriter; musician
- Instrument: Vocals
- Years active: 1966–present
- Labels: Warner Bros.; Topic; Rounder
- Formerly of: The Bunch; The Pale Orchestra; Thompson
- Spouses: Richard Thompson (m. 1972; div. 1982); Steve Kenis (m. 1985)
- Family: Teddy Thompson (son); Kamila Thompson (daughter); Zak Hobbs (grandson); Brian Pettifer (brother)
- Website: lindathompsonmusic.com

Linda Thompson (née Pettifer, later Peters; born 23 August 1947) is a British singer-songwriter.

Thompson featured in the British folk rock movement of the 1970s and 1980s, in collaboration with guitarist Richard Thompson, to whom she was married for ten years, and later as a solo artist.

== Biography ==
=== Early years ===
Born in Hackney, London, she moved with her family to her mother's home city of Glasgow, Scotland, at the age of six. Actor Brian Pettifer (born 1953) is her brother. Around 1966 she started singing in folk clubs, and in 1967 began studying modern languages at the University of London, but dropped out after four months. She changed her name to Linda Peters. By day she sang advertising jingles, including one with Manfred Mann. She recorded the Bob Dylan song "You Ain't Goin' Nowhere", released as an MGM single in 1968 by Paul McNeill and Linda Peters, McNeill being another friend of Sandy Denny and Alex Campbell. They released a second single as Paul and Linda in 1969 on Page One, featuring the John D. Loudermilk song "You're Taking My Bag". She met Richard Thompson in 1969, but they did not record together until 1972.

Her reputation led to her being invited to join the Bunch, a loose supergroup of folk rock artists including former Fairport Convention members Sandy Denny, Richard Thompson, and Ashley Hutchings which recorded an album called Rock On. This was a set of 1950s rock and roll classics. A single was released from the album: The Everly Brothers' hit "When Will I Be Loved", which was a duet by Linda and Sandy. A second single was released soon afterwards "The Loco-Motion", sung by Linda alone. Two versions exist, one with "Sweet Little Rock 'n' Roller" as the B-side and in a picture sleeve, another with "Don't Be Cruel" on the flip. Later in 1972 Linda and Richard were backing singers on Sandy Denny's solo album Sandy.

Linda teamed up with Simon Nicol and Richard (after he had left Fairport Convention). Calling themselves "Hokey Pokey", they toured as a trio. Linda and Richard married in 1972. Linda sang on Fairport's album Rosie (1973), credited as Linda Peters.

The next album, I Want to See the Bright Lights Tonight (1974) was credited to "Richard and Linda Thompson". Two albums followed in 1975: Hokey Pokey and Pour Down Like Silver. Richard had started to take an interest in Sufism, a mystical form of Islam, in 1973. After the tour, the couple went to a Sufi commune in East Anglia for six months, then to another in Maida Vale. Richard announced that he would never play again, but returned after three years. Linda found herself in a community where all the food was prepared by the women. In her words, the members were "white middle-class people trying to punish themselves, and everybody else. It taught me a lot. To stay away from sects, mostly."

=== Lights on and off again ===
Their come-back album was called First Light (1978). Richard's writing has a strong thread of disdain for fame, wealth and worldly values and attacks political hypocrisy, often in wildly abstract metaphors. Sunnyvista followed in 1979, and Shoot Out the Lights in 1982.

Shoot Out The Lights was surprisingly successful in America, and the Thompsons, despite the fractured state of their relationship, were offered a long and lucrative tour of the U.S. Simon Nicol described the final tour, in the summer of 1982, as being "like walking on a tightrope", and that as a result the first thing he did on stage was "look for the exit". The couple had separated by the time that the American tour started, and were barely speaking to each other.

The penultimate date of the tour was in Los Angeles. Linda then went to stay with her friend Linda Ronstadt. The tapes were finally released in October 2010 in the Shoot Out The Lights box set, although a version of "Walking on a Wire" from earlier in the tour is on the Free Reed RT boxed set. When Richard left Linda, she had just given birth to their third child, Kamila.

=== Linda alone ===
Linda lost her voice for the next two years as a result of spasmodic dysphonia. She made a new start in 1984, singing with "Home Service" at the National Theatre's production of The Mysteries and in 1985 she released her solo album One Clear Moment, then fell silent for eleven years. One song from the album, called "Telling Me Lies", written with Betsy Cook, was recorded by Emmylou Harris, Dolly Parton, and Linda Ronstadt for their Trio album in 1987. The recording was nominated for a Grammy in the Best Country Song category. Linda retired from music to run an antique jewellery shop in Bond Street, central London. She married Steve Kenis, an American recording artists agent at William Morris.

A compilation of Linda's earlier work, Dreams Fly Away (1996), included both previously released songs and alternate versions of some of her better-known songs. It was received politely but did not sell well. In 1999, Linda's mother died. This provoked an outpouring of sorrow and regenerated her determination to sing. Linda was diagnosed with spasmodic dysphonia, preventing her from singing. A temporary cure was found. By having botox injected into her throat, she could regain her normal singing voice for a few months. Give Me a Sad Song (2001) was positively reviewed. In 2002, she released a new CD, Fashionably Late, which featured several family members, including her son Teddy Thompson and daughter Kamila Thompson, as well as an appearance on one song by Richard Thompson.

Linda appeared along with her son Teddy, her friends The McGarrigles, and Kate McGarrigle's children Martha Wainwright and Rufus Wainwright (amongst others) in Hal Wilner's "Came So Far For Beauty" tribute concerts to the music of Leonard Cohen from 2003 to 2006. Linda sang the Cohen songs "A Thousand Kisses Deep" and "Alexandra Leaving". She appeared again with Teddy Thompson with The McGarrigles and Wainwrights for some of their family concerts, including the McGarrigle Christmas shows. In 2007, Linda released yet another set of original songs and covers, Versatile Heart. Like Fashionably Late, this too was primarily a collaboration with son Teddy Thompson, and the CD also features a supporting cast of family and friends. The CD was well received in the press. The CD opens and closes with two arrangements of a Teddy Thompson instrumental piece, "Stay Bright", the first an acoustic version, and the second a version for string quartet arranged by Nick Drake collaborator Robert Kirby. She contributed vocals to the Primal Scream album Beautiful Future (2008), on the track "Over & Over".

Linda and Richard Thompson performed a duet at 12 June 2010 Meltdown Festival tribute concert to Kate McGarrigle, which Richard coordinated.

Linda's fourth solo album, Won't Be Long Now, was released on 15 October 2013. The album features compositions and backing vocals from Teddy Thompson and his sisters as well as guitar work by Richard Thompson.

Linda appears on the album Family (2014) by the band Thompson (named for all the Thompsons that appear) having written two songs for the project. The album was produced by her son Teddy Thompson and features Richard Thompson and The Rails, who are Linda's daughter Kamila Thompson and her husband James Walbourne, as well as other related musicians, including Walbourne's brother and Richard Thompson's son from his second marriage.

In July 2024, music from Proxy Music, an album of Thompson's music, was performed at London's Cadogan Hall, with Neil McCormick of The Daily Telegraph describing it as "more of an impromptu family shindig than a slickly presented show."

== Personal life ==
In the early 1970s, she began a relationship with Richard Thompson and sang on his album Henry the Human Fly. In October 1972 the couple were married at Hampstead Town Hall. As "Richard & Linda Thompson", the couple released six studio albums between 1974 and 1982. Their children include Teddy Thompson and Kamila Thompson. Richard and Linda Thompson separated in 1982.

In 2024, Richard Thompson's touring band for the album Ship to Shore included the Thompsons' grandson Zak Hobbs.

== Discography ==
Richard and Linda Thompson

- I Want to See the Bright Lights Tonight (1974)
- Hokey Pokey (1975)
- Pour Down Like Silver (1975)
- First Light (1978)
- Sunnyvista (1979)
- Shoot Out the Lights (1982)

Richard and Linda Thompson (live)

- In Concert, November 1975 (released 2007)
- Live at the BBC – (Richard Thompson featuring Linda Thompson) (released 2011)

Solo albums

- One Clear Moment (1985)
- Fashionably Late (2002)
- Versatile Heart (2007)
- Won't Be Long Now (2013) – UK No. 76
- Proxy Music (2024)

Other projects

- Rock On – The Bunch (1972)
- The Mysteries – Home Service/National Theatre (1985)
- Family (2014)
- Linda Thompson presents 'My Mother Doesn't Know I'm On The Stage' (2018)

In 2009, No Telling from Fashionably Late was included in Topic Records' 70-year anniversary boxed set Three Score and Ten as track fifteen on the fifth CD.

Solo compilations

- Dreams Fly Away (1996)
- Give Me a Sad Song (2001)

Singles – Richard and Linda Thompson

- "I Want to See the Bright Lights Tonight" / "When I Get to the Border" (1974)
- "Hokey Pokey" / "I'll Regret It in the Morning" (1975)
- "Don't Let a Thief Steal into Your Heart" / "First Light" (1978)
- "Georgie on a Spree" / "Civilisation" (1979)
- "Don't Renege on Our Love" / "Living in Luxury" (1982)
