= Kamila Thompson =

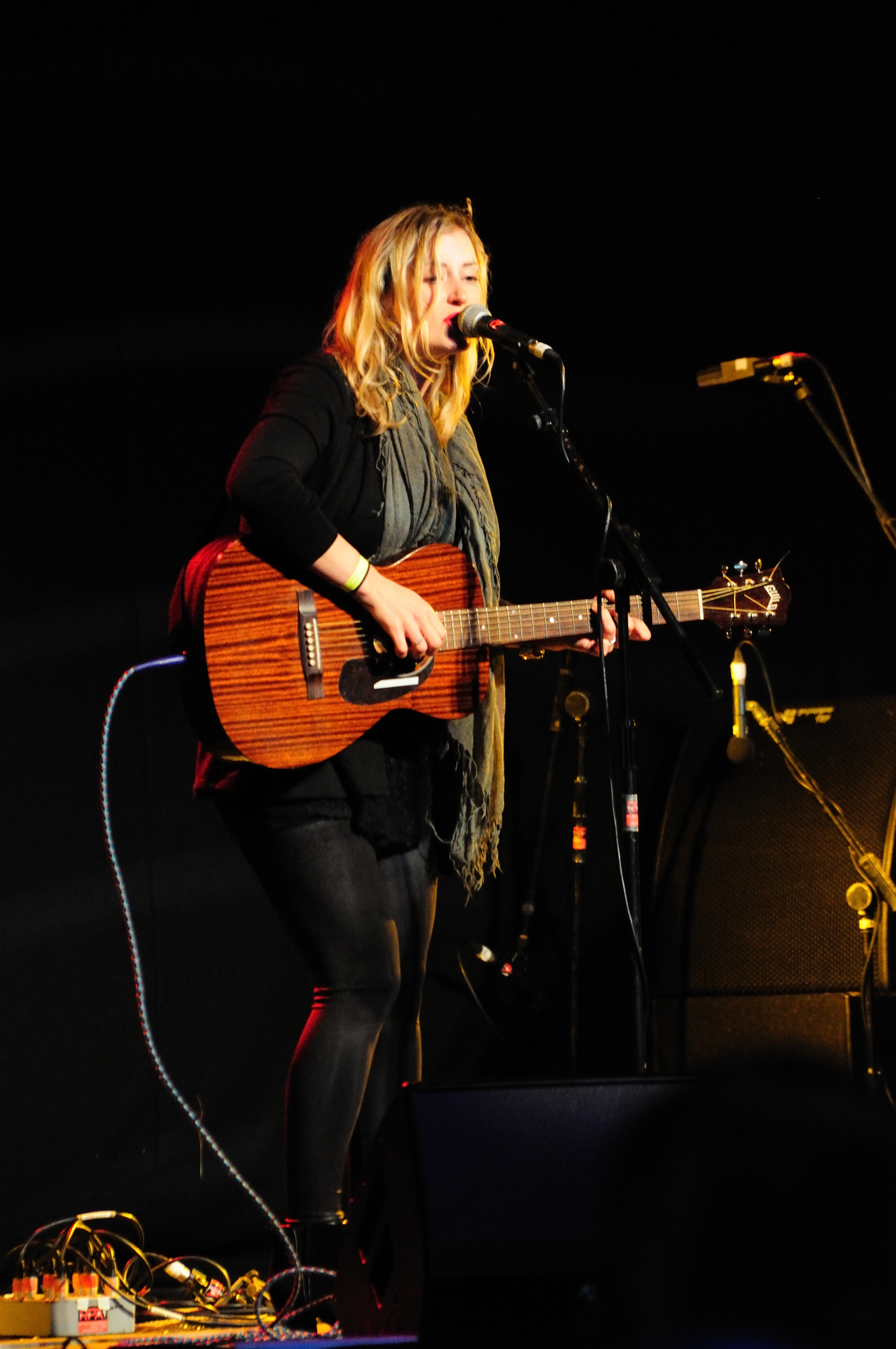
- Kamila Thompson at Big Session 2012 in Catton Park, South Derbyshire, UK on 16 June 2012.

Background information
- Also known as: Kami Thompson
- Born: 1982 (age 43–44)
- Occupation: Singer-songwriter
- Member of: The Rails

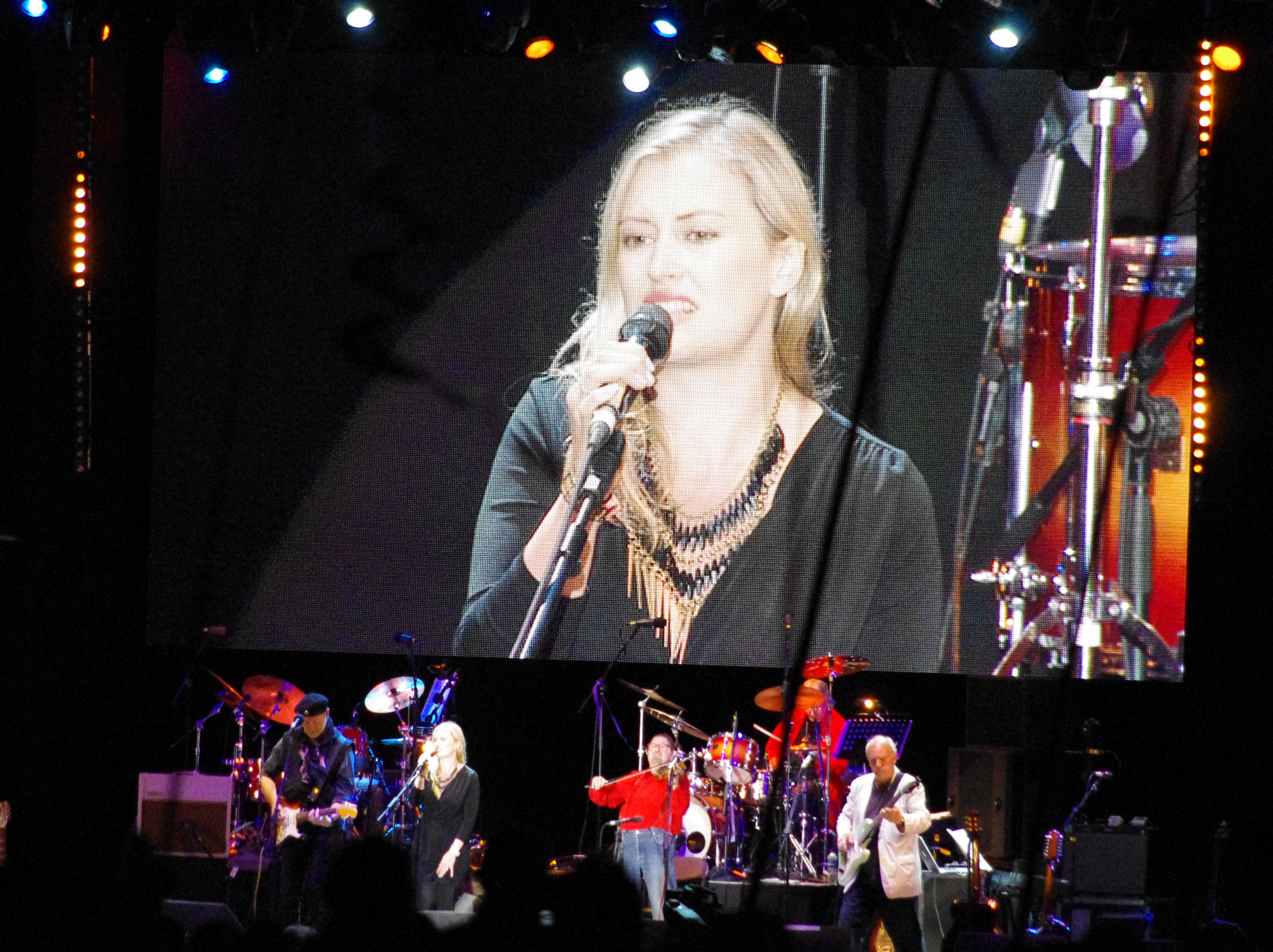
Kami Thompson & Fairport Convention, covering the Sandy Denny songs, 2012

Kamila Thompson, more commonly known as Kami Thompson, is a singer-songwriter based in London and New York. She has toured with Bonnie Prince Billy, Teddy Thompson, Sean Lennon and others, as well as appearing with the family of Loudon Wainwright III at Carnegie Hall, She has also played at Hal Willner's "Came So Far for Beauty" Leonard Cohen tribute in Dublin. Her debut recording, an EP Bad Marriage, was released in June 2010. Her debut album Love Lies was released in the UK on Warner Music in 2011. Thompson also performs and records as part of the band The Rails with husband James Walbourne. The band's first EP Habit was released on Edwyn Collins' AED Records in early 2012, and their debut album Fair Warning was released on Island Records' pink label on 5 May 2014.

== Early life and family ==
Thompson is the youngest child of British folk-rock musicians Richard and Linda Thompson. Her older brother is Teddy Thompson.

== Career ==
Thompson was backing and harmony vocalist on Linda Thompson's 2002 album Fashionably Late and Linda's 2007 album Versatile Heart, which also features a track written by Kamila called "Nice Cars".

She was an opener on the tour of Sean Lennon. She has also toured with Will Oldham (Bonny Prince Billy) in Australia and New Zealand and performed in Hal Willner's "Came So Far for Beauty" tribute to Leonard Cohen in Dublin in 2006 as well as the Wainwright Family's Christmas show at Carnegie Hall.

On 24 October 2011, Thompson released her debut full-length album Love Lies, on Warner Music UK.

Thompson is featured on Sam Sallon's 2013 album One for the Road singing a duet on the song "It's Not Hard to Lose Your Way".

In 2014, Thompson's band The Rails, featuring her husband James Walbourne, released their debut album Fair Warning. Later that year, The Rails appear on the album Family (2014) by Thompson (the band being named for all the Thompsons that appear), having written two songs for the project.

Thompson features on the track "Your Baby", from Jinnwoo's debut album Strangers Bring Me No Light, released on 2 September 2016.

== Releases ==
=== Solo albums ===
Title	Album details
Love Lies	Released: 24 October 2011; Label: Warner Music Group

=== Solo EPs ===
Title	Album details
Bad Marriage	Released: June 2010; Label: The Berlin Collective

=== Albums with The Rails ===
Title	Album details
Fair Warning	Released: 2014; Label: Island Records & Mighty village
Other People	Released: 2017; Label: Psychonaut Sounds
Cancel the Sun	Released: 2019; Label: Psychonaut Sounds/ Thirty Tigers

=== Features and appearances ===
Title	Album details
'It's Not Hard to Lose Your Way' – Sam Sallon ft. Kami Thompson	One For the Road by Sam Sallon; Released: 2013; Label: Indigo-Octagon
'Your Baby' – Jinnwoo ft. Kami Thompson	Strangers Bring Me No Light by Jinnwoo; Released: 2016; Label: GF*M Records and Cargo Records (UK)
